= Laos national football team results (2000–2019) =

This article details the fixtures and results of the Laos national football team from 2000 up until 2019.

== Results ==
Keynotes
Win
Draw
Defeat

=== 2000 ===
5 April 2000 AFC Asian Cup qualification	South Korea	9–0	Laos	Seoul, South Korea
--:-- UTC+9	Sim Jae-won 32'; Kim Eun-jung 45', 67', 71'; Lee Chun-soo 50'; Seol Ki-hyeon 58', 77', 86'; Ahn Hyo-yeon 75'	Report		Stadium: Dongdaemun Stadium; Attendance: 16,500; Referee: Hisaharu Kitamura (Japan)

7 April 2000 AFC Asian Cup qualification	Laos	0–4	Myanmar	Seoul, South Korea
--:-- UTC+9		Report	Myo Hlaing Win 32', 62'; Aung Kyaw Moe 43'; Than Toe Aung 51'	Stadium: Dongdaemun Stadium

9 April 2000 AFC Asian Cup qualification	Laos	2–1	Mongolia	Seoul, South Korea
--:-- UTC+9	Khenkitisack 26'; Homsombath 80'	Report	Buman-Uchral 63'	Stadium: Dongdaemun Stadium

7 November 2000 AFF Championship	Laos	0–5	Malaysia	Songkhla, Thailand
16:30 UTC+7		Report	Suparman 24', 54'; Adnan 31' (pen.); Omar 43'; Sofian 89'	Stadium: Tinsulanon Stadium; Referee: Jerry Andres (Philippines)

9 November 2000 AFF Championship	Singapore	3–0	Laos	Songkhla, Thailand
19:30 UTC+7	Ali 8'; Nasir 22'; Tan 90'	Report		Stadium: Tinsulanon Stadium; Referee: U Tun Hla Aung (Myanmar)

11 November 2000 AFF Championship	Cambodia	3–0	Laos	Songkhla, Thailand
16:30 UTC+7	Sochetra 59', 76'; Makara 70'	Report		Stadium: Tinsulanon Stadium; Referee: Jerry Andres (Philippines)

13 November 2000 AFF Championship	Laos	0–5	Vietnam	Songkhla, Thailand
19:00 UTC+7		Report	Văn Sỹ Thủy 8'; Vũ Công Tuyền 18'; Nguyễn Văn Sỹ 50'; Vũ Minh Hiếu 61'; Phạm Hùng Dũng 88'	Stadium: Tinsulanon Stadium; Referee: Hanlumyaung Panya (Thailand)

=== 2001 ===
30 April 2002 FIFA World Cup qualification	Oman	12–0	Laos	Muscat, Oman
16:00 UTC+4	Al-Dhabit 6', 23' (pen.), 30', 45', 45+1'; Mubarak Al-Siyabi 21'; Al-Mukhani 39', 44'; Nasser Zayid 62' (pen.); Fawzi Bashir 81', 85'; Al-Araimi 84'	Report		Stadium: Sultan Qaboos Sports Complex; Attendance: 2,000; Referee: Ammar Ammar (Lebanon)

4 May 2002 FIFA World Cup qualification	Laos	0–7	Oman	Muscat, Oman
19:15 UTC+4		Report	Al-Dhabit 15', 79'; Mubarak Al-Siyabi 36'; Al-Araimi 39', 42'; Al-Mukhaini 43'; Samir 90'	Stadium: Sultan Qaboos Sports Complex; Attendance: 2,099; Referee: Gyanu Shrestha (Nepal)

7 May 2002 FIFA World Cup qualification	Syria	11–0	Laos	Aleppo, Syria
16:00 UTC+3	Afash 15', 89'; M. Boushi 25', 79'; Bayazid 31', 53', 90'; Moussa 33'; Srour 55', 64'; N. Boushi 69'	Report		Stadium: Al-Hamadaniah Stadium; Attendance: 9,000; Referee: Ahmad Abu Khadijeh (Jordan)

11 May 2002 FIFA World Cup qualification	Laos	0–9	Syria	Aleppo, Syria
16:00 UTC+3		Report	N. Boushi 2', 50'; Srour 34'; Bayazid 37'; Shehadeh 46'; Zaher 55', 65'; Al-Khatib 75'; Al Sayed 81'	Stadium: Al-Hamadaniah Stadium; Attendance: 12,000; Referee: Mamed Mamedov (Turkmenistan)

19 May 2002 FIFA World Cup qualification	Laos	2–0	Philippines	Vientiane, Laos
18:00 UTC+7	Phounsamay 15'; Dalaphone 55'	Report		Stadium: Laos National Stadium; Attendance: 7,000; Referee: Võ Minh Trí (Vietnam)

26 May 2002 FIFA World Cup qualification	Philippines	1–1	Laos	Pasig, Philippines
19:00 UTC+8	Doña 20'	Report	Khouphachansy 81'	Stadium: PhilSports Complex; Attendance: 1,000; Referee: Jajat Hidayat (Indonesia)

=== 2002 ===
18 December 2002 AFF Championship	Thailand	5–1	Laos	Kallang, Singapore
17:35 UTC+8	Worrawoot 1', 24'; Kiatisuk 8', 83', 90'	Report	Phaphouvanin 66'	Stadium: National Stadium; Referee: Vijay Rahman (Singapore)

20 December 2002 AFF Championship	Laos	1–2	Singapore	Kallang, Singapore
20:05 UTC+8	Phaphouvanin 19'	Report	Alam Shah 6'; Noor Ali 52'	Stadium: National Stadium; Referee: Midi Nitrorejo Setiyono (Indonesia)

22 December 2002 AFF Championship	Malaysia	1–1	Laos	Bishan, Singapore
19:35 UTC+8	Nizam 27' (pen.)	Report	Phaphouvanin 29'	Stadium: Bishan Stadium; Referee: Lee Young-chun (South Korea)

=== 2003 ===
25 March 2004 AFC Asian Cup qualification	Laos	1–5	Hong Kong	So Kon Po, Hong Kong
--:-- UTC+8	Phaphouvanin 66'	Report	Chan Chi Hong 17', 35'; Kwok Yue Hung 47'; Au Wai Lun 59' (pen.), 82'	Stadium: Hong Kong Stadium

27 March 2004 AFC Asian Cup qualification	Bangladesh	1–2	Laos	So Kon Po, Hong Kong
--:-- UTC+8	Farhad 90+1'	Report	Ponephachan 30'} Phaphouvanin 37'	Stadium: Hong Kong Stadium

29 November 2006 FIFA World Cup qualification	Laos	0–0	Sri Lanka	Vientiane, Laos
17:00 UTC+7		Report		Stadium: Laos National Stadium; Attendance: 4,500; Referee: Lương Thế Tài (Vietnam)

3 December 2006 FIFA World Cup qualification	Sri Lanka	3–0 (3–0 agg.)	Laos	Colombo, Sri Lanka
18:30 UTC+5:30	Ediri 35'; Jayasuriya 59'; Hameed 90+3'	Report		Stadium: Sugathadasa Stadium; Attendance: 6,000; Referee: Ali Saleem (Maldives)

=== 2004 ===
18 February 2006 FIFA World Cup qualification	Jordan	5–0	Laos	Amman, Jordan
16:00 UTC+3	Aqel 40'; Shelbaieh 45'; Al-Shagran 63'; Ragheb 90'; Shehdeh 90+2'	Report		Stadium: Amman International Stadium; Attendance: 5,000; Referee: Sultan Al Mozahmi (Oman)

31 March 2006 FIFA World Cup qualification	Laos	0–7	Iran	Vientiane, Laos
16:00 UTC+7		Report	Daei 9', 17' (pen.); Enayati 32', 36'; Khouphachansy 54' (o.g.); Taghipour 68', 83'	Stadium: Laos National Stadium; Attendance: 7,000; Referee: Yang Mu Sheng (Chinese Taipei)

9 June 2006 FIFA World Cup qualification	Qatar	5–0	Laos	Doha, Qatar
19:30 UTC+2	Mustafa 17', 37'; Jassem 69', 86'; Bechir 89'	Report		Stadium: Al-Gharafa Stadium; Attendance: 500; Referee: Naji Abu Armana (Palestine)

8 September 2006 FIFA World Cup qualification	Laos	1–6	Qatar	Vientiane, Laos
17:00 UTC+7	Chanthalome 88'	Report	Rizik 36'; Kamil 42'; Bechir 50'; Hamzah 70'; Abdullah 86'; Al-Shammari 89'	Stadium: Laos National Stadium; Attendance: 2,900; Referee: Jimmy Napitupulu (Indonesia)

23 October 2006 FIFA World Cup qualification	Laos	2–3	Jordan	Vientiane, Laos
17:00 UTC+7	Phaphouvanin 13'; Thongphachan 53'	Report	Al-Maharmeh 28'; Al-Shagran 73', 76'	Stadium: Laos National Stadium; Attendance: 3,000; Referee: Ram Gosh (Bangladesh)

17 November 2006 FIFA World Cup qualification	Iran	7–0	Laos	Tehran, Iran
19:30 UTC+4	Daei 8', 20', 28', 58'; Nekounam 63', 72'; Borhani 69'	Report		Stadium: Azadi Stadium; Attendance: 30,000; Referee: Mamed Mamedov (Turkmenistan)

7 December 2004 AFF Championship	Laos	0–6	Indonesia	Ho Chi Minh City, Vietnam
17:00 UTC+7		Report	Boaz 25'; Ilham 28', 33'; Kanyavong 52' (o.g.); Elie 60'; Kurniawan 86'	Stadium: Thống Nhất Stadium; Referee: Rungklay Mongkol (Thailand)

11 December 2004 AFF Championship	Laos	2–1	Cambodia	Hanoi, Vietnam
17:00 UTC+7	Luang-Amath 63', 73'	Report	Darith 27'	Stadium: Mỹ Đình National Stadium; Referee: Kwon Jong-Chul (South Korea)

13 December 2004 AFF Championship	Singapore	6–2	Laos	Hanoi, Vietnam
17:00 UTC+7	Hasrin 7'; Indra 19', 74'; Thongphachan 39' (o.g.); Casmir 45', 90+2' (pen.)	Report	Phaphouvanin 22'; Luang-Amath 72' (pen.)	Stadium: Mỹ Đình National Stadium; Referee: Ahmad Khalidi Supian (Malaysia)

15 December 2004 AFF Championship	Vietnam	3–0	Laos	Hanoi, Vietnam
18:00 UTC+7	Lê Công Vinh 10'; Nguyễn Minh Phương 42'; Thạch Bảo Khanh 75'	Report		Stadium: Mỹ Đình National Stadium; Referee: Rungklay Mongkol (Thailand)

=== 2006 ===
12 November 2007 AFF Championship qualification	Philippines	1–2	Laos	Bacolod, Philippines
16:30 UTC+8	C. Greatwich 62'	Report	Sisomephone 47'; Phaphouvanin 49'	Stadium: Panaad Stadium

14 November 2007 AFF Championship qualification	Cambodia	2–2	Laos	Bacolod, Philippines
19:00 UTC+8	Vathanak 50'; Samchay 75'	Report	Soukhavong 30'; Sisomephone 35'	Stadium: Panaad Stadium

16 November 2007 AFF Championship qualification	Laos	3–2	Timor-Leste	Bacolod, Philippines
16:30 UTC+8	Saysongkham 34'; Phothilath 61'; Phommapanya 90+2'	Report	Ximenes 82'; Costa 89'	Stadium: Panaad Stadium

18 November 2007 AFF Championship qualification	Brunei	1–4	Laos	Bacolod, Philippines
19:00 UTC+8	Riwandi 20'	Report	Saysongkham 6'; Phaphouvanin 17'; Liepvisay 43'; Phothilath 55'	Stadium: Panaad Stadium

=== 2007 ===
13 January 2007 AFF Championship	Indonesia	3–1	Laos	Kallang, Singapore
17:30 UTC+8	Atep 51', 75'; Saktiawan 67'	Report	Sounthalay 13'	Stadium: National Stadium

15 January 2007 AFF Championship	Singapore	11–0	Laos	Kallang, Singapore
20:00 UTC+8	Ridhuan 10'; Alam Shah 11', 24', 61', 72', 76', 88', 90+2'; Shahril 47'; Khairul 71'; Dickson 78'	Report		Stadium: National Stadium; Attendance: 5,224; Referee: U Hla Tint (Myanmar)

17 January 2007 AFF Championship	Laos	0–9	Vietnam	Jalan Besar, Singapore
20:00 UTC+8		Report	Lê Công Vinh 1', 28', 58'; Phan Thanh Bình 29', 73' (pen.), 81', 84'; Nguyễn Văn Biển 45', 90'	Stadium: Jalan Besar Stadium; Attendance: 1,005

20 August 2007 Merdeka Tournament	Malaysia U-23	2–0	Laos	Selangor, Malaysia
20:30 UTC+8	Safee Sali 32'; Asaph D 53'	Report		Stadium: MBPJ Stadium

23 August 2007 Merdeka Tournament	Laos	1–3	Lesotho	Selangor, Malaysia
20:30 UTC+8	Visay Phaphouvanin 26'	Report	Potse Refiloe 3'; Maipato Tefo 6'; Moleko Katleho 23'	Stadium: MBPJ Stadium

25 August 2007 Merdeka Tournament	Myanmar	1–0	Laos	Selangor, Malaysia
20:30 UTC+8	Yan Paing 30'	Report		Stadium: MBPJ Stadium

=== 2008 ===
5 May 2008 AFC Challenge Cup qualification	Kyrgyzstan	Cancelled (Note: On 2 May 2008, Laos announced their withdrawal from the 2008 AFC Challenge Cup qualification.)	Laos	Bishkek, Kyrgyzstan
--:-- UTC+6				Stadium: Spartak Stadium

7 May 2008 AFC Challenge Cup qualification	Laos	Cancelled	Bangladesh	Bishkek, Kyrgyzstan
--:-- UTC+6				Stadium: Spartak Stadium

9 May 2008 AFC Challenge Cup qualification	Afghanistan	Cancelled	Laos	Bishkek, Kyrgyzstan
--:-- UTC+6				Stadium: Spartak Stadium

17 October 2008 AFF Championship qualification	Cambodia	3–2	Laos	Phnom Penh, Cambodia
16:00 UTC+7	Borey 24'; El Nasa 45'; Sovannarith 55'	Report	Lounglath 30'; Liepvisay 78'	Stadium: Olympic Stadium; Attendance: 15,000

21 October 2008 AFF Championship qualification	Philippines	1–2	Laos	Phnom Penh, Cambodia
14:00 UTC+7	Araneta 32'	Report	Lounglath 56' (pen.); Phaphouvanin 59'	Stadium: Olympic Stadium

23 October 2008 AFF Championship qualification	Laos	3–2	Brunei	Phnom Penh, Cambodia
14:00 UTC+7	Phaphouvanin 8'; Singto 89'; Phommapanya 90+3'	Report	Hardi 28'; Abu Bakar 84'	Stadium: Olympic Stadium

25 October 2008 AFF Championship qualification	Laos	2–1	Timor-Leste	Phnom Penh, Cambodia
16:00 UTC+7	Singto 7'; Phaphouvanin 50'	Report	Esteves 44'	Stadium: Olympic Stadium

6 December 2008 AFF Championship	Malaysia	3–0	Laos	Phuket, Thailand
17:00 UTC+7	Safee 68', 87'; Indra Putra 73'	Report		Stadium: Surakul Stadium; Attendance: 5,000; Referee: Midi Setiyono (Indonesia)

8 December 2008 AFF Championship	Laos	0–6	Thailand	Phuket, Thailand
19:30 UTC+7		Report	Ronnachai 19'; Patiparn 30'; Arthit 40', 52'; Anon 79', 89'	Stadium: Surakul Stadium; Attendance: 10,000; Referee: Mohamed Hadimin (Brunei)

10 December 2008 AFF Championship	Vietnam	4–0	Laos	Phuket, Thailand
19:30 UTC+7	Nguyễn Việt Thắng 48'; Phạm Thành Lương 63'; Huỳnh Quang Thanh 66'; Phan Thanh Bình 80'	Report		Stadium: Surakul Stadium; Referee: Win Cho (Myanmar)

=== 2010 ===
22 October 2010 AFF Championship qualification	Laos	0–0	Cambodia	Vientiane, Laos
18:30 UTC+7		Report		Stadium: New Laos National Stadium; Referee: Mohd Nafeez Abdul Wahab (Malaysia)

24 October 2010 AFF Championship qualification	Philippines	2–2	Laos	Vientiane, Laos
18:30 UTC+7	P. Younghusband 76' (pen.); J. Younghusband 90+4'	Report	Soukaphone 28'; Kanlaya 40'	Stadium: New Laos National Stadium; Referee: Mongkolchai Pechsri (Thailand)

26 October 2010 AFF Championship qualification	Laos	6–1	Timor-Leste	Vientiane, Laos
18:30 UTC+7	Kovanh 11'; Soukaphone 16'; Lamnao 47' (pen.); Konekham 59'; Kanlaya 61'; Ketsada 78'	Report	Chiquito 8'	Stadium: New Laos National Stadium; Referee: Phùng Đình Dũng (Vietnam)

26 November Friendly	Singapore	4–0	Laos	Jurong, Singapore
--:-- UTC+8		Report	Lamnao 8'	Stadium: Jurong West Stadium

1 December 2010 AFF Championship	Thailand	2–2	Laos	Jakarta, Indonesia
17:00 UTC+7	Sarayuth 67', 90'	Report	Konekham 53'; Kanlaya 81'	Stadium: Gelora Bung Karno Stadium; Referee: Ryuji Sato (Japan)

4 December 2010 AFF Championship	Laos	0–6	Indonesia	Jakarta, Indonesia
19:30 UTC+7		Report	Firman 26' (pen.), 51'; Ridwan 33'; Irfan 63'; Arif 77'; Okto 82'	Stadium: Gelora Bung Karno Stadium; Attendance: 70,000; Referee: Daud Abbas (Singapore)

7 December 2010 AFF Championship	Malaysia	5–1	Laos	Palembang, Indonesia
19:30 UTC+7	Amri 4', 41'; Amirul 74'; Norshahrul 77'; Mahali 90+3'	Report	Lamnao 8'	Stadium: Gelora Sriwijaya Stadium; Referee: Võ Minh Trí (Vietnam)

=== 2011 ===
10 February 2012 AFC Challenge Cup qualification	Chinese Taipei	5–2	Laos	Kaohsiung, Taiwan
19:00 UTC+08:00	Lin Cheng-yi 10'; Chang Han 22', 56'; Chen Po-liang 44'; Lo Chih-an 49'		Thongkhen 65'; Syvilay 73'	Stadium: National Stadium; Attendance: 1,000; Referee: Ng Chiu Kok (Hong Kong)

16 February 2012 AFC Challenge Cup qualification	Laos	1–1 (3–6 agg.)	Chinese Taipei	Vientiane, Laos
18:00 UTC+7	Vongchiengkham 82'		Chen Po-liang 65'	Stadium: National Sports Complex, Vientiane; Attendance: 15,300; Referee: Mohd Nafeez Abdul Wahab (Malaysia)

29 June 2014 FIFA World Cup qualification	Cambodia	4–2	Laos	Phnom Penh, Cambodia
15:00 UTC+7	Laboravy 51'; Nasa 57', 88'; Sokumpheak 66'	(Report)	Phomsouvanh 9', 59'	Stadium: Phnom Penh National Olympic Stadium; Attendance: 19,240; Referee: Yadollah Jahanbazi (Iran)

3 July 2014 FIFA World Cup qualification	Laos	6–2 (a.e.t.) (8–6 agg.)	Cambodia	Vientiane, Laos
18:00 UTC+7	Singto 19', 55'; Sayavutthi 34'; Syphasay 46'; Phaphouvanin 94'; Sysomvang 112' (pen.)	Report	Chhoeun 45'; Sokumpheak 75'	Stadium: New Laos National Stadium; Attendance: 10,000; Referee: Ryuji Sato (Japan)

23 July 2014 FIFA World Cup qualification	China	7–2	Laos	Kunming, China
15:00 UTC+8	Yang Xu 45+2', 54', 73'; Chen Tao 52', 88'; Hao Junmin 81', 90+1' (pen.)	Report	Vongchiengkham 5'; Phaphouvanin 31'	Stadium: Tuodong Stadium; Attendance: 13,500; Referee: Strebre Delovski (Australia)

28 July 2014 FIFA World Cup qualification	Laos	1–6 (3–13 agg.)	China	Vientiane, Laos
18:00 UTC+7	Phaphouvanin 47'	Report	Qu Bo 24'; Yu Hanchao 36', 87'; Deng Zhuoxiang 67', 82'; Yang Xu 90+3'	Stadium: New Laos National Stadium; Attendance: 13,000; Referee: Tayeb Shamsuzzaman (Bangladesh)

=== 2012 ===
10 September Friendly	Laos	2–1	Philippines	Vientiane, Laos
19:00	Siviengxay 53' (pen.); Saysana 79' (pen.)	Report	Gier 90+2'	Stadium: New Laos National Stadium; Attendance: 600

12 September Friendly	Thailand	2–1	Laos	Bangkok, Thailand
18:00	Sareepim 69'; Bunmathan 85' (pen.)		Saysana 8'	Stadium: Rajamangala Stadium; Referee: Chaiya Mahapab (Thailand)

7 October 2012 AFF Championship qualification	Laos	1–0	Cambodia	Yangon, Myanmar
18:00	Visay Phaphouvanin 40'	Report		Stadium: Thuwunna Stadium; Attendance: 100; Referee: Abdulla Al-Zaabi (United Arab Emirtaes)

9 October 2012 AFF Championship qualification	Timor-Leste	3–1	Laos	Yangon, Myanmar
18:00	Murilo de Almeida 43' (pen.) Adelino Trindade 51', Alan Leandro 83'	Report	Visay Phaphouvanin 77'	Stadium: Thuwunna Stadium; Referee: Ahmed Aslam (Maldives)

11 October 2012 AFF Championship qualification	Laos	3–1	Brunei	Yangon, Myanmar
15:00	Namthavixay 34'; Sayavutthi 61' (pen.); Sysomvang 83' (pen.)	Report	Rosmin 26'	Stadium: Thuwunna Stadium; Attendance: 200; Referee: Tayeb Shamsuzzaman (Bangladesh)

13 October 2012 AFF Championship qualification	Myanmar	0–0	Laos	Yangon, Myanmar
15:00				Stadium: Thuwunna Stadium

24 October 2012 VFF Cup	Laos	1–4	South Korea Universiade	Ho Chi Minh City, Vietnam
16:30	Syvilay 12'		Han Seung-Yeop 34'; Kim Pyeong-Jin 41'; Park Jung-Bin 85'; Lee Jung-Kwon 88'	Stadium: Thống Nhẩt Stadium

26 October 2012 VFF Cup	Vietnam	4–0	Laos	Ho Chi Minh City, Vietnam
19:00	Nguyễn Quang Hải 17', 37' (pen.); Nguyễn Trọng Hoàng 77'; Huỳnh Quốc Anh 80'			Stadium: Thống Nhẩt Stadium; Referee: Krishnan Ramachandran (Malaysia)

28 October 2012 VFF Cup	Turkmenistan	4–2	Laos	Ho Chi Minh City, Vietnam
16:30	Boliýan 17'; Jumanazarow 30'; Abylow 47'; Muhadow 64'		Liththideth 57'; Saysana 83'	Stadium: Thống Nhẩt Stadium

25 November 2012 AFF Championship	Indonesia	2–2	Laos	Kuala Lumpur, Malaysia
18:00	Maitimo 43'; Mofu 90'	Report	Sayavutthi 30' (pen.); Keoviengphet 80'	Stadium: Bukit Jalil National Stadium; Referee: Lam Ng Kai (Hong Kong)

28 November 2012 AFF Championship	Laos	1–4	Malaysia	Kuala Lumpur, Malaysia
20:45	Sihavong 38'	Report	Safiq 15'; Safee 67'; Wan 76'; Khyril 80'	Stadium: Bukit Jalil National Stadium; Referee: Fan Qi (China PR)

1 December 2012 AFF Championship	Singapore	4–3	Laos	Shah Alam, Malaysia
20:45	Shahril 45+1', 52'; Amri 63'; Fazrul 65'	Report	Sayavutthi 21', 81' (pen.); Liththideth 40'	Stadium: Shah Alam Stadium; Referee: Ng Kai Lam (Hong Kong)

=== 2013 ===
6 February Friendly	North Korea	1–0	Laos	Kunming, China
18:00	Unknown (?)			Stadium: Tuodong Stadium

26 February Friendly	Laos	3–3	Malaysia U-23	Vientiane, Laos
18:00	Singkeo 50'; Sysomvang 87'; Sayabboun 90+4'		Thamil 56'; Rozaimi 61'; Nurridzuan 71'	Stadium: New Laos National Stadium

2 March 2014 AFC Challenge Cup qualification	Laos	1–1	Mongolia	Vientiane, Laos
19:00 UTC+7	Sayyabounsou 33'	Report	Tumenjargal 45+2'	Stadium: New Laos National Stadium; Attendance: 1,200; Referee: Ali Shaban (Kuwait)

4 March 2014 AFC Challenge Cup qualification	Sri Lanka	2–4	Laos	Vientiane, Laos
19:00 UTC+7	Ratnayake 74'; Gunaratne 81'	Report	Vongchiengkham 31' (pen.); Sayyabounsou 47'; Sayyaboun 71'; Phimmasen 77'	Stadium: New Laos National Stadium; Attendance: 1,000; Referee: Mukhtar Al Yarimi (Yemen)

6 March 2014 AFC Challenge Cup qualification	Laos	1–1	Afghanistan	Vientiane, Laos
19:00 UTC+7	Sayavutthi 30'	Report	Ahmadi 58'	Stadium: New Laos National Stadium; Attendance: 3,000; Referee: Ali Shaban (Kuwait)

7 June Friendly	Laos	2–5	Singapore	Vientiane, Laos
18:00	Souksavanh 48'; Sihavong 62'	Report	Sahdan 6'; Hariss 27'; Baharudin 41'; Gabriel 84'; Hafiz 86'	Stadium: New Laos National Stadium; Referee: Sivakorn Pu-udom (Thailand)

5 October Friendly	United Arab Emirates	2–0	Laos	Shenzhen, China
18:00 UTC+8	Saleh 65'; Mabkhout 79'	Report		Stadium: Shenzhen Stadium

10 October Friendly	Singapore	1–0	Laos	Kallang, Singapore
19:45 UTC+8	Amri 2'			Stadium: Jalan Besar Stadium

16 November Friendly	Laos	1–1	Guam	Vientiane, Laos
16:00 UTC+7	Vongchiengkham 15'	Report	Cunliffe 90' (pen.)	Stadium: New Laos National Stadium

=== 2014 ===
13 May Friendly	Maldives	7–1	Laos	Malé, Maldives
16:00 UTC+5	Fasir 10', 83'; Niyaz 49'; Ashfaq 62' (pen.), 65'; Qasim 75'; Adhuham 82'	Report	Sihavong 50'	Stadium: National Football Stadium

20 May 2014 AFC Challenge Cup	Turkmenistan	5–1	Laos	Addu City, Maldives
14:00 UTC+5	Baýramow 42'; Durdyýew 50' (pen.), 85'; Keodouangdeth 55' (o.g.); Hojaahmedow 87'	Report	Sayavutthi 34'	Stadium: Addu Football Stadium; Attendance: 500; Referee: Ko Hyung-jin (South Korea)

22 May 2014 AFC Challenge Cup	Laos	0–2	Philippines	Addu City, Maldives
16:00 UTC+5		Report	Rota 41'; Reichelt 63'	Stadium: Addu Football Stadium; Attendance: 300; Referee: Dmitriy Mashentsev (Kyrgyzstan)

24 May 2014 AFC Challenge Cup	Afghanistan	0–0	Laos	Addu City, Maldives
16:00 UTC+5		Report		Stadium: Addu Football Stadium; Attendance: 600; Referee: Valentin Kovalenko (Uzbekistan)

12 October 2014 AFF Championship qualification	Laos	3–2	Cambodia	Vientiane, Laos
18:30 UTC+7	Sihavong 54'; Sayavutthi 70', 81'	Report	Laboravy 73'; Chanrasmey 75'	Stadium: New Laos National Stadium; Referee: Adham Makhadmeh (Jordan)

14 October 2014 AFF Championship qualification	Brunei	2–4	Laos	Vientiane, Laos
15:30 UTC+7	Fakharrazi 32'; Shah Razen 88'	Report	Vongchiengkham 3', 6', 68'; Sayavutthi 49'	Stadium: New Laos National Stadium; Referee: Dmitriy Mashentsev (Kyrgyzstan)

18 October 2014 AFF Championship qualification	Laos	2–0	Timor-Leste	Vientiane, Laos
18:30 UTC+7	Khochalern 32'; Vongchiengkham 64'	Report		Stadium: New Laos National Stadium; Referee: Fu Ming (China PR)

20 October 2014 AFF Championship qualification	Myanmar	2–1	Laos	Vientiane, Laos
17:00 UTC+7	Nanda Lin Kyaw Chit 43'; Kyaw Ko Ko 80' (pen.)	Report	Souksavanh 90+4' (pen.)	Stadium: New Laos National Stadium; Referee: Dmitriy Mashentsev (Kyrgyzstan)

13 November Friendly	Singapore	2–0	Laos	Yishun, Singapore
19:30 UTC+8	Baihakki 5'; Amri 32'			Stadium: Yishun Stadium

22 November 2014 AFF Championship	Philippines	4–1	Laos	Hanoi, Vietnam
16:00 (UTC+7)	Rota 40'; P. Younghusband 45+1'; Reichelt 77', 88'	Report	Sayavutthi 21'	Stadium: Mỹ Đình National Stadium; Referee: Wang Di (China)

25 November 2014 AFF Championship	Laos	0–3	Vietnam	Hanoi, Vietnam
19:00 (UTC+7)		Report	Vũ Minh Tuấn 27'; Lê Công Vinh 84'; Nguyễn Huy Hùng 88'	Stadium: Mỹ Đình National Stadium; Referee: Ali Sabah Al-Qaysi (Iraq)

28 November 2014 AFF Championship	Indonesia	5–1	Laos	Hanoi, Vietnam
19:00 (UTC+7)	Evan 8'; Ramdani 20', 50'; Zulham 82'; Souksavanh 89' (o.g.)	Report	Sayavutthi 28' (pen.)	Stadium: Hàng Đẫy Stadium; Referee: Ali Sabah (Iraq)

=== 2015 ===
29 May Friendly	Laos	0–2	Afghanistan	Vientiane, Laos
19:00 UTC+7		Report	Shayesteh; Isoufi	Stadium: New Laos National Stadium

2 June Friendly	Cambodia	1–1	Laos	Phnom Penh, Cambodia
18:30 UTC+7	Laboravy 46'		Sangvone 49'	Stadium: Olympic Stadium; Referee: Thorng Chankitya (Thailand)

11 June 2018 FIFA World Cup qualification	Laos	2–2	Myanmar	Vientiane, Laos
19:00 UTC+7	Sayavutthi 81' (pen.), 83'	Report (FIFA); Report (AFC)	Zaw Min Tun 41'; Kyaw Zayar Win 85'	Stadium: New Laos National Stadium; Attendance: 1,500; Referee: Tan Hai (China)

16 June 2018 FIFA World Cup qualification	Laos	0–2	Lebanon	Vientiane, Laos
19:00 UTC+7		Report (FIFA); Report (AFC)	Ghaddar 5'; Shamsin 75'	Stadium: New Laos National Stadium; Attendance: 2,500; Referee: Yu Ming-hsun (Chinese Taipei)

29 August Friendly	Cambodia	1–2	Laos	Bangkok, Thailand
19:00 UTC+7	Thierry 44'		Sitthideth 11', 47'	Stadium: Rajamangala Stadium

3 September 2018 FIFA World Cup qualification	South Korea	8–0	Laos	Hwaseong, South Korea
20:00 UTC+9	Lee Chung-yong 9'; Son Heung-min 12', 74', 89'; Kwon Chang-hoon 30', 75'; Suk Hyun-jun 57'; Lee Jae-sung 90+4'	Report		Stadium: Hwaseong Stadium; Attendance: 30,205; Referee: Jumpei Iida (Japan)

8 September 2018 FIFA World Cup qualification	Laos	0–2	Kuwait	Vientiane, Laos
19:00 UTC+7		Report	Nasser 31'; Al-Mutawa 84' (pen.)	Stadium: New Laos National Stadium; Attendance: 1,300; Referee: Sivakorn Pu-Udom (Thailand)

8 October Friendly	Laos	1–3	Malaysia	Pathum Thani, Thailand
16:00 UTC+7				Stadium: Thupatemi Stadium

13 October 2018 FIFA World Cup qualification	Myanmar	3–1	Laos	Bangkok, Thailand
19:00 UTC+7	Suan Lam Mang 13'; Kyaw Ko Ko 32'; Aung Thu 50'	Report (FIFA); Report (AFC)	Sayavutthi 2'	Stadium: Suphachalasai Stadium; Attendance: 6,500; Referee: Salah Abbas Alabbasi (Bahrain)

12 November 2018 FIFA World Cup qualification	Lebanon	7–0	Laos	Sidon, Lebanon
17:00 UTC+2	Mohamad 27'; Antar 34'; Chaito 36', 90+3'; Hamam 42'; Maatouk 59'; Oumari 90'	Report (FIFA); Report (AFC)		Stadium: Saida International Stadium; Attendance: 2,000; Referee: Sivakorn Pu-Udom (Thailand)

17 November 2018 FIFA World Cup qualification	Laos	0–5	South Korea	Vientiane, Laos
19:00 UTC+7		Report (FIFA); Report (AFC)	Ki Sung-yueng 3' (pen.), 33'; Son Heung-min 35', 67'; Suk Hyun-jun 43'	Stadium: New Laos National Stadium; Attendance: 3,000; Referee: Turki Al-Khudhayr (Saudi Arabia)

=== 2016 ===
24 March 2018 FIFA World Cup qualification	Kuwait	0–3; Awarded (Note: The match was not played as due to the suspension of the Kuwait Football Association by FIFA. On 6 April 2016, FIFA decided that the match should be forfeited by Kuwait and awarded as a 3–0 win for Laos.)	Laos	Kuwait City, Kuwait
18:35 UTC+3		Report		Stadium: Al Kuwait Sports Club Stadium

29 May Friendly	Laos	1–1	Nepal	Vientiane, Laos
--:-- UTC+7

2 June 2019 AFC Asian Cup qualification	Laos	0–1	India	Vientiane, Laos
18:30 UTC+7		Report	Lalpekhlua 55'	Stadium: New Laos National Stadium; Attendance: 1,200; Referee: Omar Al-Yaqoubi (Oman)

7 June 2019 AFC Asian Cup qualification	India	6–1 (7–1 agg.)	Laos	Guwahati, India
19:00 UTC+5:30	Lalpekhlua 43', 74'; Passi 45+1'; Jhingan 48'; Rafique 83'; Cardozo 87'	Report	Sihavong 16'	Stadium: Indira Gandhi Athletic Stadium; Attendance: 2,500; Referee: Jansen Foo (Singapore)

24 August Friendly	Saudi Arabia	4–0	Laos	Doha, Qatar
19:30 UTC+3	Al-Jassim 26'; Al-Sahlawi 48'; Awagi 66'; Al-Mogahwi 70'	Report		Stadium: Grand Hamad Stadium; Referee: Ali Abdulnabi (Bahrain)

6 September 2019 AFC Asian Cup qualification	Maldives	4–0	Laos	Malé, Maldives
21:00 UTC+5	Fasir 15'; Ashfaq 62', 90+3'; Mohamed 87'	Report		Stadium: National Football Stadium; Attendance: 4,700; Referee: Masaaki Toma (Japan)

11 October 2019 AFC Asian Cup qualification	Laos	1–1 (1–5 agg.)	Maldives	Vientiane, Laos
18:00 UTC+7	Sihavong 80'	Report	Nashid 90+1'	Stadium: New Laos National Stadium; Attendance: 1,200; Referee: Dmitry Mashentsev (Kyrgyzstan)

3 November 2016 AFC Solidarity Cup	Sri Lanka	1–2	Laos	Kuching, Malaysia
16:30 UTC+8	Asikur 90+3'	Report	Moukda 58'; Khamphanh 83'	Stadium: Sarawak State Stadium; Attendance: 100; Referee: Mohammed Al-Hoish (Saudi Arabia)

6 November 2016 AFC Solidarity Cup	Laos	1–4	Macau	Kuching, Malaysia
16:30 UTC+8	Khamphanh 3'	Report	Lao Pak Kin 21'; Leong Ka Hang 67'; N. Torrão 79', 87'	Stadium: Sarawak Stadium; Attendance: 67; Referee: Kim Woo-sung (South Korea)

9 November 2016 AFC Solidarity Cup	Mongolia	0–3	Laos	Kuching, Malaysia
19:30 UTC+8		Report	Sitthideth 7' (pen.); Khouanta 21'; Xaisongkham 83'	Stadium: Sarawak Stadium; Attendance: 321; Referee: Saoud Al-Athbah (Qatar)

12 November 2016 AFC Solidarity Cup	Nepal	2–2 (3–0 p)	Laos	Kuching, Malaysia
16:45 UTC+8	Bimal 47'; Ananta 104'	Report	Xaisongkham 18', 117'	Stadium: Sarawak State Stadium; Attendance: 117; Referee: Jansen Foo (Singapore)
	Penalties
	Heman (penalty scored); Bikram (penalty scored); Sujal (penalty scored)		(penalty missed) Bounlien; (penalty missed) Sitthideth; (penalty missed) Chanthaphone

14 November 2016 AFC Solidarity Cup	Laos	3–2	Brunei	Kuching, Malaysia
19:30 UTC+8	Keoviengphet 5'; Sitthideth 53'; Xaisongkham 82'	Report	Shahrazen 24', 55'	Stadium: Sarawak Stadium; Attendance: 257; Referee: Nazmi Nasaruddin (Malaysia)

=== 2017 ===
7 June Friendly	United Arab Emirates	4–0	Laos	Shah Alam, Malaysia
	Mabkhout 13', 47'; Khalil 38'; Ahmed 70'

2 October Friendly	Macau	3–1	Laos	Taipa, Macau
				Stadium: Estádio Campo Desportivo

5 October Friendly	Hong Kong	4–0	Laos	Mong Kok, Hong Kong
				Stadium: Mong Kok Stadium

1 December 2017 CTFA International Tournament	Laos	1–3	Philippines	Taipei, Taiwan
16:00	Kongmathilath 90+5'	Report	P. Younghusband 35'; Guirado 47'; Miyagi 89'	Stadium: Taipei Municipal Stadium; Referee: Yu Ming-Hsun (Chinese Taipei)

3 December 2017 CTFA International Tournament	Laos	2–1	Timor-Leste	Taipei, Taiwan
16:00	Nonmany Chiu 2' (pen.); Natphasouk Soukchinda 41'	Report	Cruz 84'	Stadium: Taipei Municipal Stadium; Referee: Chen Hsin-Chuan (Chinese Taipei)

5 December 2017 CTFA International Tournament	Chinese Taipei	2–0	Laos	Taipei, Taiwan
19:00	Li Mao 9', 12'	Report		Stadium: Taipei Municipal Stadium; Referee: Pranjal Banerjee (India)

=== 2018 ===
21 March Friendly	Laos	0–1	Cambodia	Vientiane, Laos
			Laboravy 86'	Stadium: New Laos National Stadium

27 March Friendly	Laos	2–2	Bangladesh	Vientiane, Laos
	Kongmathilath 30', 45+1'	Report	Jafar 81'; Rahman 90+3'	Stadium: New Laos National Stadium; Referee: Chaireag Ngamsom (Thailand)

11 September Friendly	United Arab Emirates	3–0	Laos	Palamós, Spain
20:00 UTC+2	Mabkhout 24', 26'; Abdulrahman 68'	Report		Stadium: Estadi Palamós Costa Brava; Referee: Fabio Verissimo (Portugal)

1 October 2018 Bangabandhu Cup	Bangladesh	1–0	Laos	Sylhet, Bangladesh
18:30 UTC+6	Ahmed 60'	Report		Stadium: Sylhet District Stadium; Referee: Mahmood Al-Majarafi (Oman)

3 October 2018 Bangabandhu Cup	Philippines	3–1	Laos	Sylhet, Bangladesh
18:30 UTC+6	Bedic 44' (pen.); Gayoso 53'; Bahadoran 82' (pen.)	Report	Kongmathilath 88' (pen.)	Stadium: Sylhet District Stadium; Referee: Çarymyrat Kurbanow (Turkmenistan)

16 October Friendly	Laos	1–4	Mongolia	Vientiane, Laos
18:30 UTC+7	Bounkong 23'	Report	Mönkh-Erdene 25'; Narmandakh 73'; Janseric 75'; Naranbold 83'	Stadium: New Laos National Stadium

8 November 2018 AFF Championship	Laos	0–3	Vietnam	Vientiane, Laos
19:30 UTC+7		Report	Nguyễn Công Phượng 11'; Nguyễn Anh Đức 45+2'; Nguyễn Quang Hải 68'	Stadium: New Laos National Stadium; Attendance: 15,000; Referee: Thoriq Munir Alkatiri (Indonesia)

12 November 2018 AFF Championship	Malaysia	3–1	Laos	Kuala Lumpur, Malaysia
20:45 UTC+8	Zaquan 15'; Norshahrul 86', 90+2'	Report	Kongmathilath 7'	Stadium: Bukit Jalil National Stadium; Attendance: 12,127; Referee: Sivakorn Pu-udom (Thailand)

16 November 2018 AFF Championship	Laos	1–3	Myanmar	Vientiane, Laos
19:30 UTC+7	Innalay 14'	Report	Aung Thu 45'; Htet Phyoe Wai 72'; Maung Maung Lwin 85'	Stadium: New Laos National Stadium; Attendance: 1,294; Referee: Kim Hee-gon (South Korea)

20 November 2018 AFF Championship	Cambodia	3–1	Laos	Phnom Penh, Cambodia
18:30 UTC+7	Vathanaka 18'; Udom 35' (pen.); Sokhpeng 77'	Report	Keohanam 76'	Stadium: Phnom Penh Olympic Stadium; Attendance: 25,085; Referee: Nathan Chan (Singapore)

=== 2019 ===
28 May Friendly	Laos	2–1	Sri Lanka	Vientiane, Laos
18:30 UTC+7	Champathong 86'; Douangmaity 87'		Aakib 11'	Stadium: New Laos National Stadium

31 May Friendly	Laos	2–2	Sri Lanka	Vientiane, Laos
18:30 UTC+7	Vongchiengkham 78' (pen.), 90+2'		Vongsa 50' (o.g.); Aakib 70'	Stadium: New Laos National Stadium

6 June 2022 FIFA World Cup qualification	Laos	0–1	Bangladesh	Vientiane, Laos
18:30 UTC+7		Report	Ro. Hasan 71'	Stadium: New Laos National Stadium; Attendance: 4,572; Referee: Ho Wai Sing (Hong Kong)

11 June 2022 FIFA World Cup qualification	Bangladesh	0–0 (1–0 agg.)	Laos	Dhaka, Bangladesh
19:00 UTC+6		Report		Stadium: Bangabandhu National Stadium; Referee: Timur Faizullin (Kyrgyzstan)

== Head-to-head record ==
Laos national football team head-to-head records (2000–2019)
Opponent	Pld	W	D	L	GF	GA	GD	Pts	Confederation
Afghanistan	3	0	2	1	1	3	–2	2	AFC
Bangladesh	5	1	2	2	4	5	–1	5	AFC
Brunei	5	5	0	0	17	8	+9	15	AFC
Cambodia	13	5	3	5	22	23	–1	18	AFC
China	2	0	0	2	3	13	–10	0	AFC
Chinese Taipei	3	0	1	2	3	8	–5	1	AFC
Guam	1	0	1	0	1	1	0	1	AFC
Hong Kong	2	0	0	2	1	9	–8	0	AFC
India	2	0	0	2	1	7	–6	0	AFC
Indonesia	5	0	1	4	4	22	–18	1	AFC
Iran	2	0	0	2	0	14	–14	0	AFC
Jordan	2	0	0	2	2	8	–6	0	AFC
Kuwait	2	1	0	1	3	2	+1	3	AFC
Lebanon	2	0	0	2	0	9	–9	0	AFC
Lesotho	1	0	0	1	1	3	–2	0	CAF
Macau	2	0	0	2	2	7	–5	0	AFC
Malaysia	7	0	1	6	5	24	–19	1	AFC
Maldives	3	0	1	2	2	12	–10	1	AFC
Mongolia	4	2	1	1	7	6	+1	7	AFC
Myanmar	7	0	2	5	5	15	–10	2	AFC
Nepal	2	0	2	0	3	3	0	2	AFC
North Korea	1	0	0	1	0	1	–1	0	AFC
Oman	2	0	0	2	0	19	–19	0	AFC
Philippines	10	4	2	4	14	18	–4	14	AFC
Qatar	2	0	0	2	1	11	–10	0	AFC
Saudi Arabia	1	0	0	1	0	4	–4	0	AFC
Singapore	9	0	0	9	8	38	–30	0	AFC
South Korea	3	0	0	3	0	22	–22	0	AFC
Sri Lanka	6	3	2	1	10	9	+1	11	AFC
Syria	2	0	0	2	0	20	–20	0	AFC
Thailand	4	0	1	3	4	15	–11	1	AFC
Timor-Leste	6	5	0	1	16	8	+8	15	AFC
Turkmenistan	2	0	0	2	3	9	–6	0	AFC
United Arab Emirates	3	0	0	3	0	9	–9	0	AFC
Vietnam	7	0	0	7	0	31	–31	0	AFC
Total	131	26	22	83	143	447	–304	100	
