= 2016 AFC Solidarity Cup squads =

Below are the squads for the 2016 AFC Solidarity Cup in Malaysia, which took place between 2 and 15 November 2016. The players' listed age is their age on the tournament's opening day.

== Group A ==
=== Nepal ===
Head coach: (Japan) Koji Gyotoku

No.	Pos.	Player	Date of birth (age)	Club
1	GK	Bikesh Kuthu	24 June 1993 (aged 23)	(All Nepal Football Association) Nepal Army
2	DF	Rabin Shrestha	17 May 1991 (aged 25)	(All Nepal Football Association) Nepal Police
3	DF	Biraj Maharjan	18 September 1990 (aged 26)	(All Nepal Football Association) Manang Marshyangdi
4	DF	Ananta Tamang	14 January 1998 (aged 18)	(All Nepal Football Association) ANFA Academy
5	DF	Deepak Gurung	3 October 1991 (aged 25)	(All Nepal Football Association)
6	DF	Aditya Chaudhary	19 April 1996 (aged 20)	(All Nepal Football Association) Three Star
7	FW	Bimal Gharti Magar	26 January 1998 (aged 18)	(All Nepal Football Association) Nepal Police
8	MF	Bishal Rai	6 June 1993 (aged 23)	(All Nepal Football Association) Manang Marshyangdi
9	FW	Ranjan Bista	15 May 1998 (aged 18)	(All Nepal Football Association) Manang Marshyangdi
10	FW	Anil Gurung	17 September 1986 (aged 30)	(All Nepal Football Association) Manang Marshyangdi
11	MF	Heman Gurung	27 February 1996 (aged 20)	(All Nepal Football Association) Himalayan Sherpa
12	DF	Bikram Lama	23 February 1989 (age 37)	(All Nepal Football Association) Three Star
13	DF	Kamal Shrestha	10 July 1997 (aged 19)	(All Nepal Football Association) Manang Marshyangdi
14	MF	Anjan Bista	15 May 1998 (aged 18)	(All Nepal Football Association) APF
15	MF	Sujal Shrestha	5 February 1992 (aged 24)	(All Nepal Football Association) Manang Marshyangdi
16	GK	Kiran Chemjong	24 March 1990 (aged 26)	(All Nepal Football Association) Manang Marshyangdi
17	MF	Suman Lama	9 March 1996 (aged 20)	(All Nepal Football Association) Sankata Boys
18	FW	Nawayug Shrestha	8 June 1990 (aged 26)	(All Nepal Football Association) Nepal Army
19	DF	Devendra Tamang	1 November 1993 (aged 23)	(All Nepal Football Association) Three Star
20	GK	Bishal Shrestha	12 September 1992 (aged 24)	(All Nepal Football Association) Manang Marshyangdi
21	FW	Bharat Khawas	29 October 1991 (aged 25)	(All Nepal Football Association) Nepal Army
22	MF	Rajendra Rawal	28 June 1986 (aged 30)	(All Nepal Football Association) APF
23	DF	Rajin Dhimal	1 April 1991 (aged 25)	(All Nepal Football Association) Three Star

=== Brunei ===
Head coach: (South Korea) Kwon Oh-son

No.	Pos.	Player	Date of birth (age)	Club
1	GK	Wardun Yussof	14 September 1981 (aged 35)	(Football Association of Brunei Darussalam) DPMM FC
2	DF	Afi Aminuddin	9 October 1991 (aged 25)	(Football Association of Brunei Darussalam) Indera SC
3	DF	Khairil Shahme Suhaimi	16 April 1993 (aged 23)	(Football Association of Brunei Darussalam) Tabuan U21
4	DF	Fakharrazi Hassan	15 July 1989 (aged 27)	(Football Association of Brunei Darussalam) DPMM FC
5	FW	Razimie Ramlli	6 August 1990 (aged 26)	(Football Association of Brunei Darussalam) MS ABDB
6	MF	Azwan Saleh	6 January 1988 (aged 28)	(Football Association of Brunei Darussalam) DPMM FC
7	MF	Nur Ikhmal Damit	5 March 1993 (aged 23)	(Football Association of Brunei Darussalam) Indera SC
8	MF	Baharin Hamidon	8 November 1987 (aged 28)	(Football Association of Brunei Darussalam) MS ABDB
9	MF	Faiq Bolkiah (Captain)	9 May 1998 (aged 18)	(The Football Association) Leicester City
10	FW	Abdul Azizi Ali Rahman	17 January 1987 (aged 29)	(Football Association of Brunei Darussalam) MS ABDB
11	DF	Najib Tarif	5 February 1988 (aged 28)	(Football Association of Brunei Darussalam) DPMM FC
12	MF	Maududi Hilmi Kasmi	5 February 1989 (age 37)	(Football Association of Brunei Darussalam) DPMM FC
13	MF	Rosmin Kamis	17 June 1981 (aged 35)	(Football Association of Brunei Darussalam) DPMM FC
14	MF	Azwan Ali Rahman	11 January 1992 (aged 24)	(Football Association of Brunei Darussalam) DPMM FC
15	MF	Asnawi Syazni Abdul Aziz	16 June 1996 (aged 20)	(Football Association of Brunei Darussalam) Tabuan U21
16	DF	Hairol Azaman	16 November 1980 (aged 35)	(Football Association of Brunei Darussalam) Kasuka FC
17	MF	Shafie Effendy	4 August 1995 (aged 21)	(Football Association of Brunei Darussalam) Tabuan U21
18	GK	Ishyra Asmin Jabidi	9 July 1998 (aged 18)	(Football Association of Brunei Darussalam) Tabuan U21
19	GK	Tarmizi Johari	26 December 1983 (aged 32)	(Football Association of Brunei Darussalam) MS ABDB
20	FW	Adi Said	15 October 1990 (aged 26)	(Football Association of Brunei Darussalam) DPMM FC
21	DF	Yusof Matyassin	12 March 1985 (aged 31)	(Football Association of Brunei Darussalam) MS ABDB
22	FW	Shahrazen Said	14 December 1985 (aged 30)	(Football Association of Brunei Darussalam) DPMM FC
23	MF	Helmi Zambin	30 March 1987 (aged 29)	(Football Association of Brunei Darussalam) DPMM FC

=== Timor-Leste ===
Head coach: (Brazil) Fábio Magrão

No.	Pos.	Player	Date of birth (age)	Caps	Goals	Club
1	GK	Aderito	15 May 1997 (aged 19)	4	0	(East Timor Football Federation) AS Ponta Leste
3	DF	Ade	2 June 1995 (aged 21)	19	3	(East Timor Football Federation) AS Ponta Leste
4	DF	Filipe	14 May 1995 (aged 21)	17	0	(East Timor Football Federation) DIT FC
5	DF	Victor	5 December 1997 (aged 18)	8	0	(East Timor Football Federation) AS Académica
6	DF	Armindo	18 April 1998 (aged 18)	0	0	(East Timor Football Federation) FC Porto Taibesse
7	MF	José Oliveira	28 October 1997 (aged 19)	10	1	(East Timor Football Federation) SLB Laulara
8	MF	Boavida Olegario	24 October 1994 (aged 22)	11	0	(East Timor Football Federation) AS Académica
9	FW	Rufino Gama	20 June 1998 (aged 18)	6	2	(East Timor Football Federation) AS Académica
10	FW	Henrique Cruz	6 December 1997 (aged 18)	14	0	(East Timor Football Federation) DIT FC
11	MF	Nataniel Reis	25 March 1995 (aged 21)	14	0	(East Timor Football Federation) Carsae FC
12	GK	Adi	10 August 1986 (aged 30)	14	0	(East Timor Football Federation) Carsae FC
13	FW	Ricardo Maia	21 July 1991 (aged 25)	1	1	(East Timor Football Federation) AS Ponta Leste
14	DF	Ricky	17 June 1994 (aged 22)	5	0	(East Timor Football Federation) SLB Laulara
16	FW	Silveiro Garcia	2 April 1994 (aged 22)	5	0	(East Timor Football Federation) AS Ponta Leste
19	MF	José Vide	4 February 1987 (aged 29)	8	0	(East Timor Football Federation) Karketu Dili FC
20	GK	Fagio	29 April 1997 (aged 19)	3	0	(East Timor Football Federation) FC Porto Taibesi
21	FW	Kefi	27 January 1997 (aged 19)	8	0	(East Timor Football Federation) DIT FC
22	DF	Nelson Viegas	24 December 1999 (aged 16)	10	1	(East Timor Football Federation) Karketu Dili FC
23	MF	José Fonseca (Captain)	19 September 1994 (aged 22)	23	0	(East Timor Football Federation) DIT FC

== Group B ==
=== Sri Lanka ===
Head coach: Dudley Steinwall

No.	Pos.	Player	Date of birth (age)	Caps	Goals	Club
1	GK	Ruwan Prabath Arunasiri	19 June 1993 (aged 23)			(Football Federation of Sri Lanka) Air Force SC
2	DF	Subash Madushan	31 May 1990 (aged 26)			(Football Federation of Sri Lanka) Navy SC
3	DF	Asikur Rahuman	31 December 1993 (aged 22)			(Football Federation of Sri Lanka) Pelicans SC
4	DF	Amith Kumara	16 December 1990 (aged 25)			(Football Federation of Sri Lanka) Solid SC
5	DF	Dumidu Wasanthaka	9 May 1983 (aged 33)			(Football Federation of Sri Lanka) Saunders SC Colombo
6	MF	Afeel Mohamed	9 July 1996 (aged 20)			(Football Federation of Sri Lanka) Colombo FC
7	FW	Johar Mohamed Zarwan	23 April 1996 (aged 20)			(Football Federation of Sri Lanka) Java Lane SC
8	DF	Wijesiri Sanka	28 December 1984 (aged 31)			(Football Federation of Sri Lanka) Sri Lanka Army
9	FW	Niresh Sundararaj	15 April 1998 (aged 18)			(Football Federation of Sri Lanka) Saunders SC Colombo
10	MF	Mohamed Cassim Rifnas	9 January 1995 (aged 21)			(Football Federation of Sri Lanka) Renown SC Colombo
11	FW	Liyana Arachchilage	17 June 1991 (aged 25)			(Football Federation of Sri Lanka) Air Force SC
12	MF	Chameera Sajith	29 January 1993 (aged 23)			(Football Federation of Sri Lanka) Sri Lanka Army
13	FW	Sanjeewa Edirisuriya	6 July 1991 (aged 25)			(Football Federation of Sri Lanka) Sri Lanka Army
14	FW	Danushka Manusanka	4 April 1997 (aged 19)			(Football Federation of Sri Lanka) Colombo FC
15	MF	Dananju Madushan	16 November 1993 (aged 22)			(Football Federation of Sri Lanka) Sri Lanka Army
16	DF	Rathnayake Warakagoda	13 October 1986 (aged 30)			(Football Federation of Sri Lanka) Renown SC Colombo
17	MF	Kavindu Ishan	17 October 1992 (aged 24)			(Football Federation of Sri Lanka) Air Force SC
18	MF	Chalana Chameera	10 January 1993 (aged 23)			(Football Federation of Sri Lanka) Navy SC
19	DF	Yamanalage Jayathunga	11 April 1985 (aged 31)			(Football Federation of Sri Lanka)
20	MF	Edison Figurado	25 July 1990 (aged 26)			(Football Federation of Sri Lanka) Solid SC
21	GK	Kaveesh Lakpriya	25 May 1995 (aged 21)			(Football Federation of Sri Lanka)
22	GK	Sujan Perera	18 July 1992 (aged 24)			(Football Association of Maldives) Eagles Malé
23	DF	Sunil Roshan	6 July 1993 (aged 23)			(Football Federation of Sri Lanka) Sri Lanka Army

=== Macau ===
Head coach: Tam Iao San

No.	Pos.	Player	Date of birth (age)	Caps	Goals	Club
1	GK	Ho Man Fai	24 April 1993 (aged 23)			(Macau Football Association) Monte Carlo
2	DF	Lei Ka Him	16 August 1991 (aged 25)			(Macau Football Association) Lai Chi
6	DF	Lao Pak Kin	24 May 1984 (aged 32)			(Macau Football Association) Ka I
7	DF	Chan Man	4 October 1993 (aged 23)			(Portuguese Football Federation) SC Olhanense
8	MF	Cheang Cheng Ieong	18 August 1984 (aged 32)			(Macau Football Association) CD Monte Carlo
9	FW	Leong Ka Hang	22 November 1992 (aged 23)			(Football Association of Hong Kong, China) Pegasus FC
10	FW	Niki Torrão	18 November 1987 (aged 28)			(Macau Football Association) Benfica de Macau
11	MF	Lam Ka Seng	28 May 1994 (aged 22)			(Macau Football Association) MFA Development
12	MF	Lee Keng Pan	28 February 1990 (aged 26)			(Macau Football Association) Ka I
13	DF	Kam Chi Hou	4 April 1995 (aged 21)			(Macau Football Association) MFA Development
14	DF	Kou Ut Cheong	21 May 1992 (aged 24)			(Macau Football Association) Chao Pak Kei
15	MF	Cheong Hoi San	28 June 1998 (aged 18)			(Macau Football Association) MFA Development
16	MF	Ho Chi Fong	30 September 1994 (aged 22)			(Macau Football Association) Monte Carlo
17	MF	Kong Cheng Hou	2 August 1986 (aged 30)			(Macau Football Association) Ka I
19	DF	Sio Ka Un	16 March 1992 (aged 24)			(Macau Football Association) Lai Chi
20	MF	Choi Weng Hou	4 July 1992 (aged 24)			(Macau Football Association) Chao Pak Kei
21	MF	Pang Chi Hang	3 November 1993 (aged 22)			(Macau Football Association) Lai Chi
22	GK	Lo Weng Hou	31 January 1996 (aged 20)			(Macau Football Association) MFA Development
23	FW	Lei Kam Hong	4 May 1988 (aged 28)			(Macau Football Association) Benfica de Macau

=== Mongolia ===
Head coach: (Japan) Toshiaki Imai

No.	Pos.	Player	Date of birth (age)	Caps	Goals	Club
1	GK	Ariunbold Batsaikhan	3 April 1990 (aged 26)	4	0	(Mongolian Football Federation) Erchim
2	DF	Tögöldur Galt	6 January 1995 (aged 21)	0	0	(Mongolian Football Federation) Erchim
3	DF	Törbat Daginaa (Captain)	31 July 1992 (aged 24)	6	1	(Mongolian Football Federation) Khoromkhon
4	DF	Otgonbayar Oyunbaatar	9 April 1993 (aged 23)	0	0	(Mongolian Football Federation) Khoromkhon
5	MF	Purevdorj Erdenebat	2 October 1994 (aged 22)	3	1	(Mongolian Football Federation) Ulaanbataryn Unaganuud
6	MF	Murun Altankhuyag	21 September 1989 (aged 27)	14	2	(Mongolian Football Federation) Ulaanbaatar City
7	FW	Nyam-Osor Naranbold	22 February 1992 (aged 24)	7	3	(Mongolian Football Federation) Khoromkhon
8	FW	Gankhuyag Serodyanjiv	6 September 1994 (aged 22)	0	0	(Mongolian Football Federation) Khangarid
9	FW	Oyunbaataryn Mijiddorj	22 August 1996 (aged 20)	2	0	(Mongolian Football Federation) Khangarid
10	MF	Oyuunbatyn Bayarjargal	16 August 1989 (aged 27)	3	4	(Mongolian Football Federation) Ulaanbaatar
11	FW	Batbilguun Ganbaatar	25 August 1990 (aged 26)	0	0	(Mongolian Football Federation) Erchim
12	DF	Davaajav Battur	21 May 1990 (aged 26)	1	0	(Mongolian Football Federation) Erchim
13	MF	Jansyerik Maratkhan	4 April 1999 (aged 17)	1	0	(Mongolian Football Federation) Deren
14	MF	Baljinnyam Batmunkh	10 December 1999 (aged 16)	0	0	(Mongolian Football Federation) Erchim
15	FW	Gal-Erdenegiin Soyol-Erdene	16 March 1996 (aged 20)	3	1	(Mongolian Football Federation) Erchim
16	MF	Sündorj Janchiv	1 August 1994 (aged 22)	0	0	(Mongolian Football Federation) Erchim
17	DF	Batmönkhiin Erkhembayar	8 December 1985 (aged 30)	5	1	(Mongolian Football Federation) Erchim
18	MF	Mönkh-Erdeniin Tögöldör	23 February 1991 (aged 25)	9	5	(Mongolian Football Federation) Erchim
19	MF	Mönkh-Erdene Tsagaantsooj	16 July 1992 (aged 24)	3	0	(Mongolian Football Federation) Khangarid
20	DF	Bilgüün Ganbold	2 April 1983 (aged 33)	1	0	(Mongolian Football Federation) Erchim
21	GK	Mönkh-Erdene Enkhtaivan	17 October 1995 (aged 21)	0	0	(Mongolian Football Federation) Sharyn Gol FC
22	MF	Ulsbold Altanzul	4 April 1994 (aged 22)	0	0	(Mongolian Football Federation) Khoromkhon
23	GK	Otgonpürev Enkhbayar	28 March 1996 (aged 20)	0	0	(Mongolian Football Federation) Khoromkhon

=== Laos ===
Head coach: Valakone Phomphakdy

No.	Pos.	Player	Date of birth (age)	Caps	Goals	Club
1	GK	Chintana Souksavath	20 July 1990 (aged 26)			(Lao Football Federation) Lao Toyota FC
2	DF	Santi Somphoupheth	2 December 1997 (aged 18)			(Lao Football Federation) NUOL FC
3	DF	Khamphanh Sonthanalay	31 October 1997 (aged 19)			(Lao Football Federation) CSC Champa
4	DF	Khamphoumy Hanvilay	2 December 1990 (aged 25)			(Lao Football Federation) CSC Champa
5	MF	Souksavanh Somsanith	3 June 1995 (aged 21)			(Lao Football Federation) NUOL FC
6	DF	Saynakhonevieng Phommapanya	28 October 1988 (aged 28)			(Lao Football Federation) Lao Toyota FC
7	MF	Phatthana Syvilay	4 April 1990 (aged 26)			(Lao Football Federation) Lao Toyota FC
8	MF	Keoviengphet Lithideth	30 November 1992 (aged 23)			(Lao Football Federation) Ezra FC
9	FW	Sittideth Khanthavong	2 September 1994 (aged 22)			(Lao Football Federation) Lao Toyota FC
10	DF	Thenthong Phonsettha	30 January 1993 (aged 23)			(Lao Football Federation) Lao Toyota FC
11	MF	Sisawad Dalavong	11 August 1996 (aged 20)			(Lao Football Federation) NUOL FC
12	MF	Phouthone Innalay	10 October 1993 (aged 23)			(Lao Football Federation) Lao Army F.C.
13	GK	Vieng Akhom Vilavong	23 May 1993 (aged 23)			(Lao Football Federation) Electricité du Laos
14	DF	Bounlien Bounpachack	10 December 1994 (aged 21)			(Lao Football Federation) Electricité du Laos
15	DF	Thipphachanh Inthavong	19 August 1996 (aged 20)			(Lao Football Federation) VSV United
16	MF	Khouanta Sivongthong	10 February 1992 (aged 24)			(Lao Football Federation) Lao Toyota FC
17	DF	Kanya Kounvongsa	28 May 1990 (aged 26)			(Lao Football Federation) Lanexang United F.C.
19	MF	Chanthaphone Waenvongsoth	4 November 1994 (aged 21)			(Lao Football Federation) Electricité du Laos
20	DF	Moukda Souksavath	14 July 1989 (aged 27)			(Lao Football Federation) Lao Toyota FC
21	FW	Sangvone Phimmasen	16 November 1989 (aged 26)			(Lao Football Federation) IDSEA Champasak United
22	MF	Vongdalasen Sayoulasouk	16 December 1990 (aged 25)			(Lao Football Federation) Lao Toyota FC
23	FW	Xaysongkham Champathong	19 May 1993 (aged 23)			(Lao Football Federation) Lao Police Club
