= 2013 Sarawak FA season =

Sarawak
2013 season
- President: Datu Sudarsono Osman
- Head Coach: Robert Alberts
- Stadium: Sarawak State Stadium
- Premier League: 1st (promoted)
- FA Cup: Quarter-finals
- Malaysia Cup: Semi-finals
- Top goalscorer: League: Bobby Gonzalez (21); All: Bobby Gonzalez (28)
Home colours	Away colours

The 2013 season was Sarawak FA's 1st season in the Malaysia Premier League, after relegated in 2012 Malaysia Super League. Sarawak FA was relegated by Pahang in Playoff Qualifying after the MSL reducing the teams competing in 2013 to 12 teams from 14 teams. 2013 was the best ever Sarawak comeback after almost 13 years of Sarawak Black era. For the 2013 season Sarawak was promoted to 2014 Malaysia Super League after being 1st in the league and being invincible after securing 18 wins with 4 draws and being undefeated throughout the season.

This is Robert Alberts' third season in charge after taking over from Haji Mohd Zaki Sheikh Ahmad in 2011.

Sarawak was successful in home soil with the records of 84% home wins throughout the 2013 season with 91% home league wins. Sarawak only lost to Kelantan in Malaysia FA Cup Quarter-finals by 0–2. Sarawak also drew with Sabah 0–0 in league games and 1–1 to Pahang in the most memorable night of Semi-finals Malaysia Cup which they lost by aggregate 4-2 that stops them to equal their record in 1999 Final Malaysia Cup.

== 2013 Malaysia Premier League ==
Sarawak were unbeaten in their league games thus winning it for the first time. They were promoted to Malaysia Super League after defeated Kuala Lumpur 4–0 in Stadium Negeri.

Overall								Home						Away					
Pld	W	D	L	GF	GA	GD	Pts	W	D	L	GF	GA	GD	W	D	L	GF	GA	GD
22	18	4	0	49	12	+37	58	10	1	0	28	3	+25	8	3	0	21	9	+12

Last updated: 18 September 2013.
Source: 2013 Malaysia Premier League

=== Fixtures and results ===
Date	Opponents	H/A	Score	Goalscorers
7 Jan	Perlis FA	A	1-2	Ivan; Bobby
11 Jan	(Selangor) UiTM FC	H	5-0	Bobby x2; Guy; Ivan; Joseph
14 Jan	KL SPA Putrajaya FC	A	1-1	Bobby Gonzales
18 Jan	(Kuala Lumpur) Pos Malaysia FC	H	2-0	Ivan; Azizan Saperi
21 Jan	(Kuala Lumpur) Sime Darby	A	0-0	
15 Feb	PDRM FA	H	1-0	Joseph Kallang Tie
18 Feb	(Negeri Sembilan) NS Betaria FC	A	0-1	Guy Bwele
22 Feb	Johor FA	H	3-2	Hairol Mokhtar; Azizan Baba x2
1 Mar	Kuala Lumpur FA	A	0-1	Ivan Babic
8 Mar	Sabah FA	H	0-0	
30 Mar	Kedah FA	H	1-0	Bobby Gonzales
12 Apr	Kedah FA	A	1-1	Ivan Babic
19 Apr	Perlis FA	H	2-0	Joseph Kallang Tie; Bobby Gonzales
26 Apr	(Selangor) UiTM FC	A	3-5	Bobby Gozales x4; Zamri Morshidi
15 May	KL SPA Putrajaya FC	H	2-1	Guy Bwele; Bobby Gonzales
10 May	(Kuala Lumpur) Sime Darby	H	1-0	Bobby Gonzales
13 May	PDRM FA	A	1-3	Azizan Baba; Muamer Salibasic;Bobby Gonzales
17 May	(Negeri Sembilan) NS Betaria FC	H	7-0	Zamri Morshidi; Bobby Gonzales x4;Guy Bwele; Muamer Salibasic
21 May	(Kuala Lumpur) Pos Malaysia FC	A	0-3	Muamer Salibasic; Bobby Gonzales x2
21 Jun	Johor FA	A	1-2	Muamer Salibasic; Bobby Gonzales
24 Jun	Kuala Lumpur FA	H	4-0	Muamer Salibasic; Ronny Harun; Joseph Kallang Tie; Guy Bwele
5 Jul	Sabah FA	A	1-2	Muamer Salibasic; Bobby Gonzales

== 2013 Malaysia FA Cup ==
=== Round of 32 ===
25 January	Sarawak	3–0	Malacca	Sarawak Stadium, Kuching, Sarawak
20:15 UTC+08:00	Shahrol Saperi 66'; Bobby Gonzales 80', 88'

=== Round of 16 ===
26 February	Sarawak	2–0	(Penang) PBAPP	Sarawak Stadium, Kuching, Sarawak
20:45 UTC+08:00	Azizan Baba 32'; Bobby Gonzales 57'

=== Quarter-finals ===
Team 1	Agg.	Team 2	1st leg	2nd leg
Kelantan	4–1	Sarawak	2–1	2 – 0

==== First leg ====
6 April	Kelantan	2–1	Sarawak	Sultan Muhammad IV Stadium, Kota Bharu, Kelantan
20:45 UTC+08:00	Faiz Subri 7'; Khairul Izuan Rosli 20'	Report	Joseph Kalang 48'	Attendance: 14,000; Referee: Mohd Zamzaidi Katimin

==== Second leg ====
16 April	Sarawak	0–2	Kelantan	Sarawak Stadium, Kuching, Sarawak
20:15 UTC+08:00		Report	Indra Putra 19'; Nor Farhan 31'	Attendance: 15,000; Referee: Nagor Amir Noor Mohamed

== 2013 Malaysia Cup ==
Sarawak were drawn in Group D with Malaysia Super League Champions, Singapore Lions XII, Perak FA and Malaysia Premier League team, Kedah FA whom were the first team to win Double Treble in 2006-2007 and 2007–2008. Sarawak started with a loss to Perak FA in Ipoh Stadium 2-1 after leading 1–0 in the first half. Sarawak buck up in their second match against Lions XII in Stadium Negeri 2–1. Sarawak were drawn 0–0 in Darul Aman after both Kedah and Sarawak fails to score any goals in their third group matches. Sarawak then captivated to win 4–0 in Stadium Negeri defeating Kedah in their fourth matches. With a just a draw will do, Sarawak fails to secure their spot to Quarter-finals in the fifth match after lost 1–0 to the home side Lions XII. Sarawak need to win their last match in order to book their place in the Quarter-finals for the first time since 2006. Sarawak beaten Perak 6–1 with Muamer Salibasic scores hat-trick on that night. Sarawak were group champion of group D while Lions XII placed second.

Sarawak reached their first Malaysia Cup semi-finals in 13 years after defeating Sime Darby 3–1 at the State Stadium in the quarter-final second leg. Sarawak advanced to the semi-finals with a 3-1 aggregate win. However, they were stop by Pahang in Semi-finals after losing 4–2 on aggregate.

Overall								Home						Away					
Pld	W	D	L	GF	GA	GD	Pts	W	D	L	GF	GA	GD	W	D	L	GF	GA	GD
10	4	3	3	18	10	+8	15	4	1	0	16	4	+12	0	2	3	2	6	−4

Last updated: 18 September 2013.
Source: 2013 Malaysia Cup

- Include Semi-final

Group D

Team	Pld	W	D	L	GF	GA	GD	Pts
Sarawak FA (A)	6	3	1	2	13	5	+8	10
(Singapore) LionsXII (A)	6	3	1	2	9	7	+2	10
Perak FA	6	2	1	3	6	11	−5	7
Kedah FA	6	1	3	2	5	10	−5	6

(A) Advance to the 2013 Piala Malaysia quarter finals
20 August 2013
20:45

Perak FA	2–1	Sarawak FA
Paulo Rangel 65', 90'		Joseph Kalang 31'

Perak Stadium, Ipoh, Perak
Attendance: 10,000
Referee: Zamzaidi Katimin (Melaka)

24 August 2013
20:45

Sarawak FA	2–1	(Singapore) LionsXII
Shakir Hamzah 11' (o.g.); Joseph Kalang 71' (pen.)		Safuwan Baharudin 78'

Sarawak State Stadium, Kuching, Sarawak
Attendance: 14,000
Referee: Syed Azhar Syed Kamar (Kuala Lumpur)

27 August 2013
20:45

Kedah FA	0–0	Sarawak FA

Darul Aman Stadium, Alor Setar, Kedah
Attendance: 8,400
Referee: Nagor Amir Noor Mohamed (Kuala Lumpur)

31 August 2013
20:45

Sarawak FA	4–0	Kedah FA
Zamri Morshidi 55'; Muamer Salibašić 63'; Bobby Gonzales 75', 78'

Sarawak State Stadium, Kuching, Sarawak
Attendance: 15,000
Referee: Amirul Izwan Yaakub (Perak)

18 September 2013
19:45

LionsXII (Singapore)	1–0	Sarawak FA
Fazrul Nawaz 63'

Jalan Besar Stadium, Kallang, Singapore
Attendance: 6,834
Referee: Nagor Amir Noor Mohamed (Kuala Lumpur)

21 September 2013
20:45

Sarawak FA	6-1	Perak FA
Khairi Kiman 7' (o.g.); Bobby Gonzales 8'; Muamer Salibašić 45', 60', 74'; Zamri Morshidi 58'		Yong Kuong Yong 24'

Sarawak State Stadium, Kuching, Sarawak
Attendance: 20,000
Referee: Samsudin Ibrahim (Terengganu)

Knockout stage

Quarterfinals
D2	(Singapore) LionsXII	1	1	2
A1	ATM FA	0	4	4
C1	Kelantan FA	2	6	8
B2	Johor Darul Takzim	4	1	5
C2	Pahang FA	3	2	5
B1	(Selangor) PKNS FC	2	1	3
A2	(Kuala Lumpur) Sime Darby FC	0	1	1
D1	Sarawak FA	0	3	3

Semifinals
A1	ATM FA	1	2	3
C1	Kelantan FA	2	2	4
C2	Pahang FA	3	1	4
D1	Sarawak FA	1	1	2

Final
C1	Kelantan FA	0
C2	Pahang FA	1

Quarter-finals

Team 1	Agg.	Team 2	1st leg	2nd leg
Sime Darby FC	1–3	Sarawak FA	0–0	1–3

First Leg

28 September 2013
20:45 UTC+8

Sime Darby FC (Kuala Lumpur)	0–0	Sarawak FA

Majlis Perbandaran Selayang Stadium, Selayang, Selangor
Attendance: 4,500
Referee: Wan Mohd Tarmizi Wan Ibrahim (Selangor)

Second leg

5 October 2013
20:45 UTC+8

Sarawak FA	3–1	(Kuala Lumpur) Sime Darby FC
Muamer Salibašić 27', 55', 85'		Asrol Ibrahim 6'

Sarawak Stadium, Kuching, Sarawak
Attendance: 22,000
Referee: Mohd. Zamzaidi Katimin (Melaka)

Sarawak FA won 3–1 on aggregate.

Semi-finals

Team 1	Agg.	Team 2	1st leg	2nd leg
Pahang FA	4–2	Sarawak FA	3–1	1–1

First Leg

19 October 2013
20:45 UTC+8

Pahang FA	3–1	Sarawak FA
Azamuddin Akil 30', 33'; Matías Conti 38'		Shahrol Saperi 40'

Darul Makmur Stadium, Kuantan, Pahang
Attendance: 40,000
Referee: Wan Mohd Tarmizi Wan Ibrahim (Selangor)

Second Leg

26 October 2013
20:45 UTC+8

Sarawak FA	1–1	Pahang FA
Bobby Gonzales 32'		Fauzi Roslan 74'

Sarawak Stadium, Kuching, Sarawak
Attendance: 22,000
Referee: Shamsudin Ibrahim (Terengganu)

Pahang FA won 4–2 on aggregate.
