= Aiman Al-Hagri =

Yemeni footballer

Personal information
- Full name: Aiman Saleh Abdullah Al-Hagri
- Date of birth: 3 February 1993 (age 33)
- Place of birth: Ibb, Yemen
- Height: 1.78 m (5 ft 10 in)
- Position: Attacking midfielder

Youth career
- 2007–2008: Al-Sha'ab Ibb

Senior career*
Years	Team	Apps	(Gls)
2008–2011	Al-Sha'ab Ibb	?	(16)
2011	Tractor Sazi	?	(0)
2011–2012	Al-Sha'ab Ibb	?	(7)
2012–2013	Al-Najma	?	(3)
2013	Al-Shabab	?	(0)
2013–2014	Al-Riffa		
2014–2015	Al-Najma		
2015–2016	Al-Nojoom FC		
2017–2018	Shillong Lajong	11	(0)
2018	Muaither		

International career^{‡}
2011–2012	Yemen U-20	4	(0)
2011–	Yemen U-23	5	(3)
2011–	Yemen	25	(3)
- * Club domestic league appearances and goals ‡ National team caps and goals as of 27 February 2017

Aiman Saleh Al-Hagri, commonly known as Aiman Al-Hagri (Arabic: أيمن صلاح عبدالله الهاجري; born 3 February 1993), is a Yemeni professional footballer who plays as an attacking midfielder. He represented Yemen national football team and last played for Muaither SC in the Qatari Second Division.

== Club career ==
Al-Hagri began his professional career in Yemeni League side Shaab Ibb SCC in 2008. He scored 16 league goals for this side before moving to Persian Gulf Pro League side Tractor Sazi in 2011.

On 30 July 2013, he signed a six-months contract with Oman Professional League club Al-Shabab club.

He has also played for Bahraini clubs Al-Najma and Al Riffa, Omani side Al-Shabab, Prince Mohammad bin Salman League outfit Al-Nojoom, Indian side Shillong Lajong FC, Qatari Second Division club Muaither SC. With Al Riffa, he won the 2013–14 Bahrain Professional League and 2013–14 Bahrain FA Cup.

In 2017, he signed with I-League side Shillong Lajong FC and debuted for the club against Gokulam Kerala FC on 27 November in a 1–0 win match. He appeared in 11 league matches for the Meghalaya-based side.

== International career ==
Al-Hagri represented Yemen's U-20 and U-23 sides from 2011 to 2014.

On 7 August 2011, he debuted for Yemen national football team against Jordan. He appeared in 25 international matches for his country, scoring 3 goals.

== International goals ==
Scores and results list Yemen's goal tally first.

No	Date	Venue	Opponent	Score	Result	Competition
1.	22 March 2013	Shah Alam Stadium, Shah Alam, Malaysia	Malaysia	1–0	1–2	2015 AFC Asian Cup qualification
2.	10 October 2014	Al Ahli Stadium, Manama, Bahrain	Iraq	1–0	1–0	Friendly
3.	2 June 2016	National Football Stadium, Malé, Maldives	Maldives	1–0	2–0	2019 AFC Asian Cup qualification

== Honours ==
=== Club ===
Al-Sha'ab Ibb

- Yemeni League: 2011–12

Al-Riffa

- Bahraini Premier League: 2013–14
- Bahraini FA Cup: 2013–14

== See also ==
- List of Yemeni expatriate men's footballers
