= 2016 AFC Solidarity Cup =

Piala Solidariti AFC 2016

Tournament details
- Host country: Malaysia
- City: Kuching
- Dates: 2–15 November
- Teams: 9 (from 1 confederation)
- Venues: 2 (in 1 host city)

Final positions
- Champions: Nepal (1st title)
- Runners-up: Macau
- Third place: Laos
- Fourth place: Brunei

Tournament statistics
- Matches played: 13
- Goals scored: 37 (2.85 per match)
- Attendance: 2,384 (183 per match)
- Top scorer(s): (Brunei) Shahrazen Said (Laos) Xaisongkham Champathong (Macau) Niki Torrão (4 goals each)
- Best player: (Macau) Leong Ka Hang
- Fair play award: Laos

The 2016 AFC Solidarity Cup was the inaugural and only edition of the AFC Solidarity Cup, an international football tournament. It took place between 2–15 November 2016 in Malaysia.

The tournament was created by the Asian Football Confederation as a replacement for the AFC Challenge Cup which was played for the last time in 2014.

A total of nine teams were eligible to compete in this edition of the tournament. Six teams were eligible to compete after losing in the first round of the 2018 FIFA World Cup/2019 AFC Asian Cup qualification competition, while three teams were eligible to compete after losing in the play-off round 2 of the 2019 AFC Asian Cup qualification competition. After Pakistan and Bangladesh withdrew, only seven teams competed in the tournament.

== Qualified teams ==
The following six teams qualified after losing in the first round of the 2018 FIFA World Cup/2019 AFC Asian Cup qualification competition:

- Brunei
- Macau
- Mongolia
- Nepal
- Pakistan
- Sri Lanka

The following three teams qualified after losing in the play-off round 2 of the 2019 AFC Asian Cup qualification competition:

- Loser play-off 2.1: Laos
- Loser play-off 2.2: Bangladesh
- Loser play-off 2.3: Timor-Leste

== Venues ==
The tournament was held in Kuching at the Sarawak Stadium and Sarawak State Stadium.

== Draw ==
The draw took place on 8 September 2016, 15:00 MYT (UTC+8), at the AFC House in Kuala Lumpur, Malaysia.

The seedings were based on the FIFA Ranking of August 2016. As the draw was held before the play-off round 2 of the 2019 AFC Asian Cup qualification competition was played, the identities of the Round 2 losers, as well as the number of teams which would enter the competition, were not known at the time of the draw.

Qualified as	Pot	Team	FIFA Ranking
Asian Cup qualifying first round losers	Pot 1	Nepal	188
Asian Cup qualifying first round losers	Pot 1	Sri Lanka	193
Asian Cup qualifying first round losers	Pot 2	Pakistan (Note: Pakistan withdrew after the draw.)	194
Asian Cup qualifying first round losers	Pot 2	Macau	195
Asian Cup qualifying first round losers	Pot 3	Brunei	198
Asian Cup qualifying first round losers	Pot 3	Mongolia	202
Asian Cup qualifying play-off round 2 losers	Pot 4	Laos	177
Asian Cup qualifying play-off round 2 losers	Pot 4	Bangladesh (Note: Because Bhutan did not express an interest in participating in the tournament prior to the draw, to ensure that both groups have a minimum of four teams, the loser of play-off 2.2 was assigned to position 5 in Group A. Bangladesh withdrew after losing in the play-off round.)	183
Asian Cup qualifying play-off round 2 losers	Pot 4	Timor-Leste	186

== Squads ==
Each national association must submit a list of 18–23 players, three of those players must be goalkeepers.

== Group stage ==
The tournament's format would change depending upon the number of teams that agree to partake in the competition. Should nine teams enter, the two group winners advance to the final. Should only eight teams enter, the two group winners and two group runners-up advance to the semi-finals. Since at the end only seven teams entered, the top two teams of each group advanced to the semi-finals.

Tiebreakers

The teams were ranked according to points (3 points for a win, 1 point for a draw, 0 points for a loss). If tied on points, tiebreakers were applied in the following order:

1. Greater number of points obtained in the group matches between the teams concerned;
2. Goal difference resulting from the group matches between the teams concerned;
3. Greater number of goals scored in the group matches between the teams concerned;
4. If, after applying criteria 1 to 3, teams still have an equal ranking, criteria 1 to 3 are reapplied exclusively to the matches between the teams in question to determine their final rankings. If this procedure does not lead to a decision, criteria 5 to 9 apply;
5. Goal difference in all the group matches;
6. Greater number of goals scored in all the group matches;
7. Penalty shoot-out if only two teams are involved and they are both on the field of play;
8. Fewer score calculated according to the number of yellow and red cards received in the group matches (1 point for a single yellow card, 3 points for a red card as a consequence of two yellow cards, 3 points for a direct red card, 4 points for a yellow card followed by a direct red card);
9. Drawing of lots.

All times were local, MYT (UTC+8).

=== Group A ===
Pos	Team	Pld	W	D	L	GF	GA	GD	Pts	Qualification
1	Nepal	2	1	1	0	3	0	+3	4	Knockout stage
2	Brunei	2	1	0	1	4	3	+1	3	Knockout stage
3	Timor-Leste	2	0	1	1	0	4	−4	1	
4	Bangladesh	0	0	0	0	0	0	0	0	Withdrew
5	Pakistan	0	0	0	0	0	0	0	0	Withdrew

Source: AFC
Rules for classification: Tiebreakers
2 November 2016
19:30

Brunei	4–0	Timor-Leste
Azwan A. 63', 69'; Shahrazen 71' (pen.); Adi 80'	Report

Sarawak Stadium, Kuching
Attendance: 100
Referee: Payam Heidari (Iran)

5 November 2016
19:30

Timor-Leste	0–0	Nepal
	Report

Sarawak State Stadium, Kuching
Attendance: 315
Referee: Saoud Al-Athbah (Qatar)

8 November 2016
19:30

Nepal	3–0	Brunei
Nawayug 45+2'; Bharat 72'; Bimal 80' (pen.)	Report

Sarawak Stadium, Kuching
Attendance: 210
Referee: Mohammed Al-Hoish (Saudi Arabia)

=== Group B ===
Pos	Team	Pld	W	D	L	GF	GA	GD	Pts	Qualification
1	Macau	3	2	1	0	7	3	+4	7	Knockout stage
2	Laos	3	2	0	1	6	5	+1	6	Knockout stage
3	Mongolia	3	1	0	2	3	5	−2	3	
4	Sri Lanka	3	0	1	2	2	5	−3	1	

Source: AFC
Rules for classification: Tiebreakers
3 November 2016
16:30

Sri Lanka	1–2	Laos
Asikur 90+3'	Report	Moukda 58'; Khamphanh 83'

Sarawak State Stadium, Kuching
Attendance: 100
Referee: Mohammed Al-Hoish (Saudi Arabia)
3 November 2016
19:30

Macau	2–1	Mongolia
N. Torrão 14', 75'	Report	Tögöldör 29'

Sarawak Stadium, Kuching
Attendance: 90
Referee: Jansen Foo (Singapore)

6 November 2016
16:30

Laos	1–4	Macau
Khamphanh 3'	Report	Lao Pak Kin 21'; Leong Ka Hang 67'; N. Torrão 79', 87'

Sarawak Stadium, Kuching
Attendance: 67
Referee: Kim Woo-sung (South Korea)
6 November 2016
19:30

Mongolia	2–0	Sri Lanka
Nyam-Osor 50' (pen.), 66' (pen.)	Report

Sarawak State Stadium, Kuching
Attendance: 226
Referee: Nazmi Nasaruddin (Malaysia)

9 November 2016
19:30

Sri Lanka	1–1	Macau
Kavindu 5'	Report	Choi Weng Hou 86'

Sarawak State Stadium, Kuching
Attendance: 93
Referee: Payam Heidari (Iran)
9 November 2016
19:30

Mongolia	0–3	Laos
	Report	Sitthideth 7' (pen.); Khouanta 21'; Xaisongkham 83'

Sarawak Stadium, Kuching
Attendance: 321
Referee: Saoud Al-Athbah (Qatar)

== Knockout stage ==
In the knockout stage, extra time and penalty shoot-out were used to decide the winner if necessary.

=== Bracket ===
Semi-finals
12 November – Kuching
Nepal (p)	2 (3)
Laos	2 (0)
12 November – Kuching
Macau (p)	1 (4)
Brunei	1 (3)

Final
15 November – Kuching
Nepal	1
Macau	0
Third place
14 November – Kuching
Laos	3
Brunei	2

=== Semi-finals ===
12 November 2016
16:45

Nepal	2–2 (a.e.t.)	Laos
Bimal 47'; Ananta 104'	Report	Xaisongkham 18', 117'
Penalties
Heman (penalty scored); Bikram (penalty scored); Sujal (penalty scored)	3–0	(penalty missed) Bounlien; (penalty missed) Sitthideth; (penalty missed) Chanthaphone

Sarawak State Stadium, Kuching
Attendance: 117
Referee: Jansen Foo (Singapore)

12 November 2016
19:30

Macau	1–1 (a.e.t.)	Brunei
Leong Ka Hang 59'	Report	Shahrazen 27'
Penalties
N. Torrão (penalty scored); Leong Ka Hang (penalty scored); Chan Man (penalty scored); Sio Ka Un (penalty scored)	4–3	(penalty scored) Faiq; (penalty scored) Shahrazen; (penalty missed) Rosmin; (penalty scored) Azwan S. (penalty missed) Maududi

Sarawak Stadium, Kuching
Attendance: 331
Referee: Kim Woo-sung (South Korea)

=== Third place match ===
14 November 2016
19:30

Laos	3–2	Brunei
Keoviengphet 5'; Sitthideth 53'; Xaisongkham 82'	Report	Shahrazen 24', 55'

Sarawak Stadium, Kuching
Attendance: 257
Referee: Nazmi Nasaruddin (Malaysia)

=== Final ===
15 November 2016
19:30

Nepal	1–0	Macau
Sujal 29'	Report

Sarawak Stadium, Kuching
Attendance: 157
Referee: Payam Heidari (Iran)

Due to the withdrawal of Guam and the suspension of Kuwait, the AFC decided to invite both Nepal and Macau, the top two teams of the 2016 AFC Solidarity Cup, to re-enter 2019 AFC Asian Cup qualification as replacements in order to maintain 24 teams in the third round of the competition.

== Winners ==
2016 AFC Solidarity Cup
(Nepal)
Nepal
First title

== Awards ==
The following awards were given at the conclusion of the tournament:

Top Scorer	Most Valuable Player	Fair Play Award
(Brunei) Shah Razen Said	(Macau) Leong Ka Hang	Laos

== Goalscorers ==
4 goals

- (Brunei) Shah Razen Said
- (Laos) Xaisongkham Champathong
- (Macau) Niki Torrão

2 goals

- (Brunei) Azwan Ali Rahman
- (Laos) Khamphanh Sonthanalay
- (Laos) Sitthideth Khanthavong
- (Macau) Leong Ka Hang
- (Mongolia) Nyam-Osor Naranbold
- (Nepal) Bimal Gharti Magar

1 goal

- (Brunei) Adi Said
- (Laos) Keoviengphet Liththideth
- (Laos) Khouanta Sivongthong
- (Laos) Moukda Souksavath
- (Macau) Choi Weng Hou
- (Macau) Lao Pak Kin
- (Mongolia) Mönkh-Erdengiin Tögöldör
- (Nepal) Ananta Tamang
- (Nepal) Bharat Khawas
- (Nepal) Nawayug Shrestha
- (Nepal) Sujal Shrestha
- (Sri Lanka) Asikur Rahuman
- (Sri Lanka) Kavindu Ishan

Source: the-afc.com

== Final standings ==
Pos.	Team	G	Pld	W	D	L	Pts	GF	GA	GD
1	Nepal	A	4	2	2	0	8	6	2	+4
2	Macau	B	5	2	2	1	8	8	5	+3
3	Laos	B	5	3	1	1	10	11	9	+2
4	Brunei	A	4	1	1	2	4	7	7	0
Eliminated in the group stage
5	Mongolia	B	3	1	0	2	3	3	5	−2
6	Timor-Leste	A	2	0	1	1	1	0	4	−4
7	Sri Lanka	B	3	0	1	2	1	3	5	−2
