= Ananta Tamang =

Nepalese footballer (born 1998)

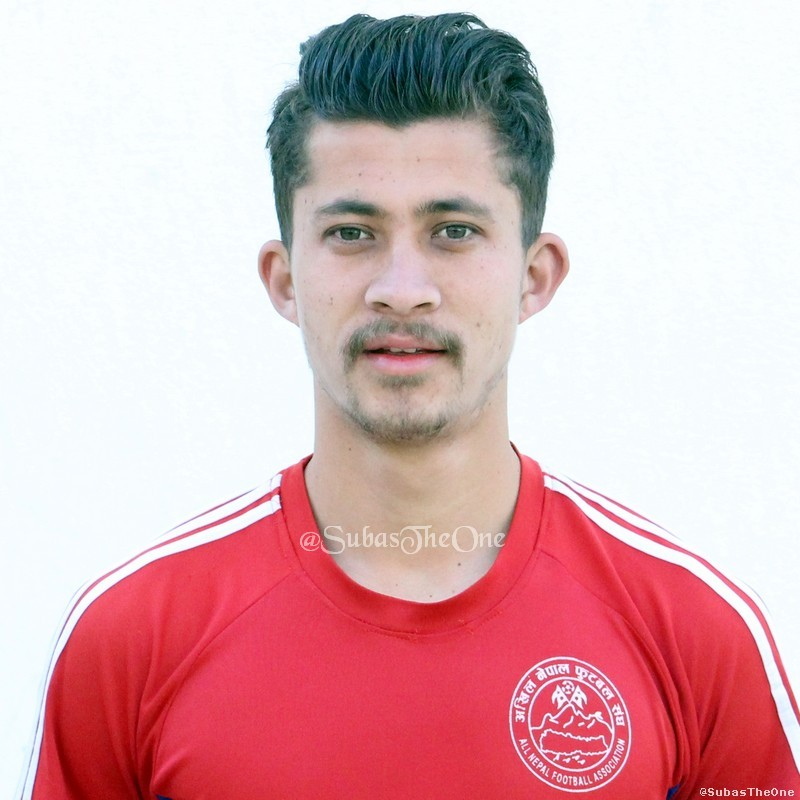
- Tamang with Nepal in 2017

Personal information
- Full name: Ananta Tamang
- Date of birth: 14 January 1998 (age 28)
- Place of birth: Jhapa, Nepal
- Height: 1.78 m (5 ft 10 in)
- Position: Centre-back

Team information
- Current team: Fortis
- Number: 44

Youth career
- 2012–2016: ANFA Academy

Senior career*
Years	Team	Apps	(Gls)
2017–2018	Marbella United		
2018–2022	Three Star Club		
2022	East Bengal	1	(0)
2023–2025	Lalitpur City		
2023–2024	Church Boys United	9	(1)
2025	Tribhuvan Army	3	(1)
2025–	Fortis	12	(1)

International career^{‡}
2013–2014	Nepal U17	6	(1)
2015	Nepal U19	4	(0)
2015–2021	Nepal U23	9	(1)
2014–	Nepal	72	(5)
Medal record
Men's football
Representing Nepal
SAFF Championship
Runner-up	2021 Maldives
AFC Solidarity Cup
Winner	2016
South Asian Games
Gold medal – first place	2016 India
Gold medal – first place	2021 Kathmandu
SAFF U-20 Championship
Winner	2015
- * Club domestic league appearances and goals as of 21 April 2026 ‡ National team caps and goals as of 13 November 2025

Ananta Tamang (Nepali: अनन्त तामाङ; born 14 January 1998) is a Nepalese professional footballer who plays as a defender for Bangladesh Football League club Fortis. He is also a member of the Nepal national team. He was vice-captain of the national under-19 football team which went on to win the 2015 SAFF U-19 Championship. Tamang made his senior national team debut on 31 August 2015 in a friendly against India.

== Club career ==
=== Earlier career ===
In January 2017, Tamang earned a spot to train and be a part of Spanish club Marbella United's pre-season duties in 2015–16 season. He later joined the club in 2018 but shortly after, he got injured.

He later returned to Nepal and signed with Martyr's Memorial A-Division League side Three Star Club.

=== East Bengal ===
On 10 February 2022, Tamang was roped in by Indian Super League club SC East Bengal. He joined the club as their sole AFC Quota replacing Australian defender Tomislav Mrcela. He made his debut for club on March 5, against Bengaluru FC in a 1–0 defeat, which was their final game of the season.

=== Chitwan ===
On 6 March 2022, Tamang joined Nepal Super League outfit FC Chitwan.

=== Fortis ===
He joined Fortis for the 2025–26 Bangladesh Football League.

== International career ==
=== U-16 ===
Tamang represented Nepal at the 2014 AFC U-16 Championship, captaining his country in the first game against Uzbekistan in the absence of regular captain Bimal Gharti Magar. Tamang also scored a headed goal in a 1–4 defeat to North Korea, a game which eliminated Nepal from the tournament.

=== U-19 ===
Tamang played every minute of every game at the 2015 SAFF U-19 Championship as the host Nepal won the tournament. Tamang also played all three games at the 2016 AFC U-19 Championship qualification but this time they were unsuccessful to qualify.

=== U-23 ===
Tamang represented Nepal during the 2016 AFC U-23 Championship qualification but his country had a disastrous campaign, losing all four games and failing to score a single goal. Tamang himself had a particularly poor game against Iran where the last two goals of the match where the result of Tamang's poor headed clearances.

== Style of play ==
Tamang comes from a traditional cut of cloth. With excellent 1v1 skills, he relies heavily on tackles, last man challenges, and interceptions to get rid of the dangers. His ability to consistently be on track with opposition strikers till the last moment is the key attribute.

== Career statistics ==
=== International goals ===
Scores and results list Nepal's goal tally first.

No.	Date	Venue	Opponent	Score	Result	Competition
1.	12 November 2016	Sarawak State Stadium, Kuching, Malaysia	Laos	2–1	2–2 (3–0 p)	2016 AFC Solidarity Cup
2.	6 September 2018	Bangabandhu National Stadium, Dhaka, Bangladesh	Bhutan	1–0	4–0	2018 SAFF Championship
3.	26 September 2021	Qatar University Stadium, Doha, Qatar	Oman	1–2	2–7	Friendly
4.	22 March 2023	Dasarath Stadium, Kathmandu, Nepal	Laos	1–0	2–0	2023 Prime Minister's Three Nations Cup
5.	13 November 2025	National Stadium, Dhaka, Bangladesh	Bangladesh	2–2	2–2	Friendly

== Honours ==
=== Nepal U-16 ===
- SAFF U-17 Championship runner-up: 2013

=== Nepal U-19 ===
- SAFF U-20 Championship: 2015

=== Nepal U-23 ===
- South Asian Games: 2016
- South Asian Games: 2019

=== Nepal national team ===
- Bangabandhu Cup: 2016
- AFC Solidarity Cup: 2016

=== Clubs ===
Church Boys United

- Martyr's Memorial A-Division League (1) :2023
