= 2016 AFF Championship qualification =

Tournament details
- Host country: Cambodia
- Dates: 15–21 October 2016
- Teams: 4 (from 1 sub-confederation)
- Venues: 2 (in 1 host city)

Tournament statistics
- Matches played: 6
- Goals scored: 23 (3.83 per match)
- Top scorer: (Laos) Phatthana Syvilay (4 goals)

The 2016 AFF Championship qualification tournament was the qualification process for the 2016 AFF Championship, the eleventh edition of the AFF Championship. It was held in Cambodia and involved either teams that finished last in the group stage of 2014 AFF Championship or lower ranked teams in Southeast Asia. The format was a single round-robin tournament with the top team qualifying for the tournament proper.

The matches were originally scheduled to be held between 13 and 22 October, before being announced as shifting forward slightly to the 15 and 21 October 2016, the same day Yanmar and Suzuki confirmed their sponsorship.

== Venues ==
(Cambodia) Phnom Penh
Olympic Stadium	RSN Stadium
Capacity: 50,000	Capacity: 5,000
2016 AFF Championship qualification is located in Cambodia

== Results ==
- Times listed are local (UTC+7:00)

Pos	Team	Pld	W	D	L	GF	GA	GD	Pts	Qualification
1	Cambodia (H)	3	3	0	0	8	3	+5	9	Final tournament
2	Laos	3	2	0	1	7	6	+1	6	
3	Brunei	3	1	0	2	5	8	−3	3	
4	Timor-Leste	3	0	0	3	4	7	−3	0	

Source: AFF
(H) Hosts
15 October 2016
15:30

Brunei	2–1	Timor-Leste
Adi 22'; Shafie 28'	Report	Gama 11'

Olympic Stadium, Phnom Penh
Attendance: 45,000
Referee: Sherzod Kasimov (Uzbekistan)
15 October 2016
18:30

Cambodia	2–1	Laos
Udom 43' (pen.); Chhoeun 81'	Report	Moukda 52'

Olympic Stadium, Phnom Penh
Attendance: 60,000
Referee: Ahmad Ibrahim (Jordan)

18 October 2016
15:30

Timor-Leste	1–2	Laos
Ricardo 79'	Report	Phatthana 42' (pen.); Soukaphone 85'

Olympic Stadium, Phnom Penh
Attendance: 12,000
Referee: Yaqoub Al-Hammadi (United Arab Emirates)
18 October 2016
18:30

Brunei	0–3	Cambodia
	Report	Udom 6', 43'; Sokpheng 9'

Olympic Stadium, Phnom Penh
Attendance: 45,000
Referee: Lao Fong Hei (Hong Kong)

21 October 2016
18:30

Laos	4–3	Brunei
Soukaphone 45'; Phatthana 51' (pen.), 57', 76'	Report	Adi 36'; Faiq 67' (pen.); Razimie 90+3'

RSN Stadium, Phnom Penh
Attendance: 200
Referee: Ahmad Ibrahim (Jordan)
21 October 2016
18:30

Cambodia	3–2	Timor-Leste
Dina 1'; Vathanaka 17', 77'	Report	Anggisu 20' (pen.); Nelson 35'

Olympic Stadium, Phnom Penh
Attendance: 55,000
Referee: Sherzod Kasimov (Uzbekistan)

== Goalscorers ==
4 goals

- (Laos) Phatthana Syvilay

3 goals

- (Cambodia) Prak Mony Udom

2 goals

- (Brunei) Adi Said
- (Cambodia) Chan Vathanaka
- (Laos) Soukaphone Vongchiengkham

1 goal

- (Brunei) Faiq Bolkiah
- (Brunei) Shafie Effendy
- (Brunei) Razimie Ramlli
- (Cambodia) Chhin Chhoeun
- (Cambodia) Keo Sokpheng
- (Cambodia) Tith Dina
- (Laos) Moukda Souksavath
- (Timor-Leste) Anggisu Barbosa
- (Timor-Leste) Rufino Gama
- (Timor-Leste) Ricardo Maia
- (Timor-Leste) Nelson Viegas
