= Khamphanh Sonthanalay =

Laotian footballer

Personal information
- Date of birth: 31 October 1997 (age 28)
- Place of birth: Laos
- Position: Defender

Team information
- Current team: Ubon Ratchathani

Senior career*
Years	Team	Apps	(Gls)
2016	CSC Champa F.C.		
2017	Lao Toyota F.C.		
2018–	Ubon Ratchathani	0	(0)

International career^{‡}
2017–	Laos U23	7	(2)
2016–	Laos	8	(2)
- * Club domestic league appearances and goals as of 21:20, 10 November 2016 (UTC) ‡ National team caps and goals as of 01:57, 12 November 2017 (UTC)

Khamphanh Sonthanalay (born 31 October 1997) is a Laotian footballer who plays for Ubon Ratchathani in Thai League 3 and the Laos national team.

== International career ==
Sonthanalay received his first call up to the senior national team for the 2016 AFC Solidarity Cup. He scored his first international goal on his debut, the game-winning goal of a 2–1 victory over Sri Lanka on 3 November 2016. He scored his second goal in as many games as he scored his team's only goal in their next match, a 1–4 defeat to Macau.

=== International goals ===
Scores and results list Laos's goal tally first.

#	Date	Venue	Opponent	Score	Result	Competition
1	3 November 2016	Sarawak State Stadium, Kuching, Malaysia	Sri Lanka	2–1	2–1	2016 AFC Solidarity Cup
2	6 November 2016	Sarawak Stadium, Kuching, Malaysia	Macau	1–0	1–4	2016 AFC Solidarity Cup
Last updated 6 November 2016

=== International career statistics ===
As of match played 5 October 2017

Laos national team
Year	Apps	Goals
2016	5	2
2017	3	0
Total	8	2
