= Sitthideth Khanthavong =

Laotian professional footballer

Personal information
- Full name: Sitthideth Khanthavong
- Date of birth: 2 September 1994 (age 32)
- Place of birth: Vientiane, Laos
- Height: 1.70 m (5 ft 7 in)
- Position: Striker

Senior career*
Years	Team	Apps	(Gls)
2014–2017	Lao Toyota		

International career^{‡}
2014–2017	Laos U-23	1	(0)
2014–2017	Laos	6	(1)
- * Club domestic league appearances and goals as of 12:43, 23 November 2014 (UTC) ‡ National team caps and goals as of 19:03, 22 March 2017 (UTC)

Sitthideth Khanthavong (born 2 September 1994) is a Laotian professional footballer who played as a striker for Lao Toyota FC in the Lao Premier League and the Laos national team. He was banned for life from football-related activities as a result of match-fixing, along with 21 other players of the Laotian national side and Lao Toyota.

== International goals ==
No.	Date	Venue	Opponent	Score	Result	Competition
1.	9 November 2016	Sarawak Stadium, Kuching, Malaysia	Mongolia	1–0	3–0	2016 AFC Solidarity Cup
2.	14 November 2016	Sarawak Stadium, Kuching, Malaysia	Brunei	2–1	3–2	2016 AFC Solidarity Cup
