= Jigme Tshering Dorji =

Bhutanese professional footballer

Personal information
- Full name: Jigme Tshering Dorji
- Date of birth: 26 February 1995 (age 31)
- Place of birth: Thimphu, Bhutan
- Height: 1.85 m (6 ft 1 in)
- Position: Defender

Youth career
- 2012–2014: Thimphu City

Senior career*
Years	Team	Apps	(Gls)
2015–2018	Thimphu City		
2018–2021	Paro FC		
2022	Muthoot FA		
2022–2023	Transport United		

International career
2015–	Bhutan	29	(1)
- * Club domestic league appearances and goals

Jigme Tshering Dorji (also spelled as Dorjee) is a Bhutanese professional footballer. He made his first appearance for the Bhutan national football team in 2015.

== Career statistics ==
=== International goals ===
#	Date	Venue	Opponent	Score	Result	Competition
1.	11 October 2016	Changlimithang Stadium, Thimphu, Bhutan	Bangladesh	1–0	3-1	2019 AFC Asian Cup qualification
