= Moukda Souksavath =

Laotian footballer

Moukda Souksavath (born 14 July 1989) is a Laotian football player who plays for Vientiane. He is a member of Laos national football team.

== Career statistics ==
=== International ===
Appearances and goals by national team and year
National team	Year	Apps	Goals
Laos	2011	4	0
Laos	2012	–	
Laos	2013	–	
Laos	2014	–	
Laos	2015	10	0
Laos	2016	10	2
Total		24	2

Scores and results list Laos's goal tally first, score column indicates score after each Souksavath goal.

List of international goals scored by Moukda Souksavath
No.	Date	Venue	Opponent	Score	Result	Competition
1	15 October 2016	Olympic Stadium, Phnom Penh, Cambodia	Cambodia	1–1	1–2	2016 AFF Championship qualification
2	3 November 2016	Sarawak State Stadium, Kuching, Malaysia	Sri Lanka	1–0	2–1	2016 AFC Solidarity Cup
