= Tögöldur Galt =

Mongolian footballer

Tuguldur Galt
Personal information
- Date of birth: 1 June 1995 (age 31)
- Place of birth: Mongolia
- Height: 1.74 m (5 ft 9 in)
- Position: Defender

Team information
- Current team: Erchim
- Number: 27

Senior career*
Years	Team	Apps	(Gls)
2014–	Erchim		

International career^{‡}
2016–	Mongolia	9	(0)
- * Club domestic league appearances and goals ‡ National team caps and goals as of 30 March 2021

Tuguldur Galt is a Mongolian footballer who plays as defender for Erchim FC and the Mongolia national football team.

== Career ==
Galt started his career with Erchim.

Playing for Erchim in an AFC Cup match against Kigwancha Sports Club, he headed the ball which inexplicably went into his own net.

He was nominated for 2017 Mongolian Footballer of the Year.

In 2018, he received interest from Uzbekistan clubs.

He is a Mongolia international.

== Career statistics ==
=== International ===
Mongolia national team
Year	Apps	Goals
2016	6	0
2017	1	0
Total	7	0

Statistics accurate as of match played 5 October 2017
