= Ricardo Sousa Maia =

East Timorese footballer

Ricardo Maia
Personal information
- Full name: Ricardo Sousa da Cruz Maia
- Date of birth: 21 July 1991 (age 35)
- Place of birth: Dili, East Timor, Indonesia
- Height: 1.83 m (6 ft 0 in)
- Position: Forward

International career^{‡}
Years	Team	Apps	(Gls)
2014	Timor-Leste U23	3	(1)
2016–	Timor-Leste	1	(1)
- ‡ National team caps and goals as of 5 November 2016

Ricardo Sousa da Cruz Maia (born 21 July 1991) is a football player who currently plays for Timor-Leste national football team as a forward.

== International goals ==
Scores and results list Timor Leste's goal tally first.

No.	Date	Venue	Opponent	Score	Result	Competition
1.	18 October 2016	Olympic Stadium, Phnom Penh, Cambodia	Laos	1–1	1–2	2016 AFF Championship qualification
