= Kanya Kounvongsa =

Laotian footballer

Kanya Kounvongsa (born 28 May 1990 in Vientiane) is a Laotian football player who plays for Vientiane. He is a member of the Laos national football team.

== See also ==
- Football in Laos
