= Bilgüün Ganbold =

Mongolian footballer

Personal information
- Full name: Ganboldyn Bilgüün; Ганболдын Билгүүн
- Date of birth: April 12, 1991 (age 35)
- Place of birth: Mongolia
- Height: 1.79 m (5 ft 10 in)
- Position: Defender

Team information
- Current team: Erchim

Senior career*
| Years | Team | Apps | (Gls) |
| 2012– | Erchim | | |

International career
| 2013– | Mongolia | 22 | (0) |
- * Club domestic league appearances and goals

Ganboldyn Bilgüün (Mongolian: Ганболдын Билгүүн) is a Mongolian footballer who plays as a defender for Mongolian Premier League club Erchim. He made his first appearance for the Mongolia national football team in 2013.
