= Khampheng Sayavutthi =

Laotian footballer

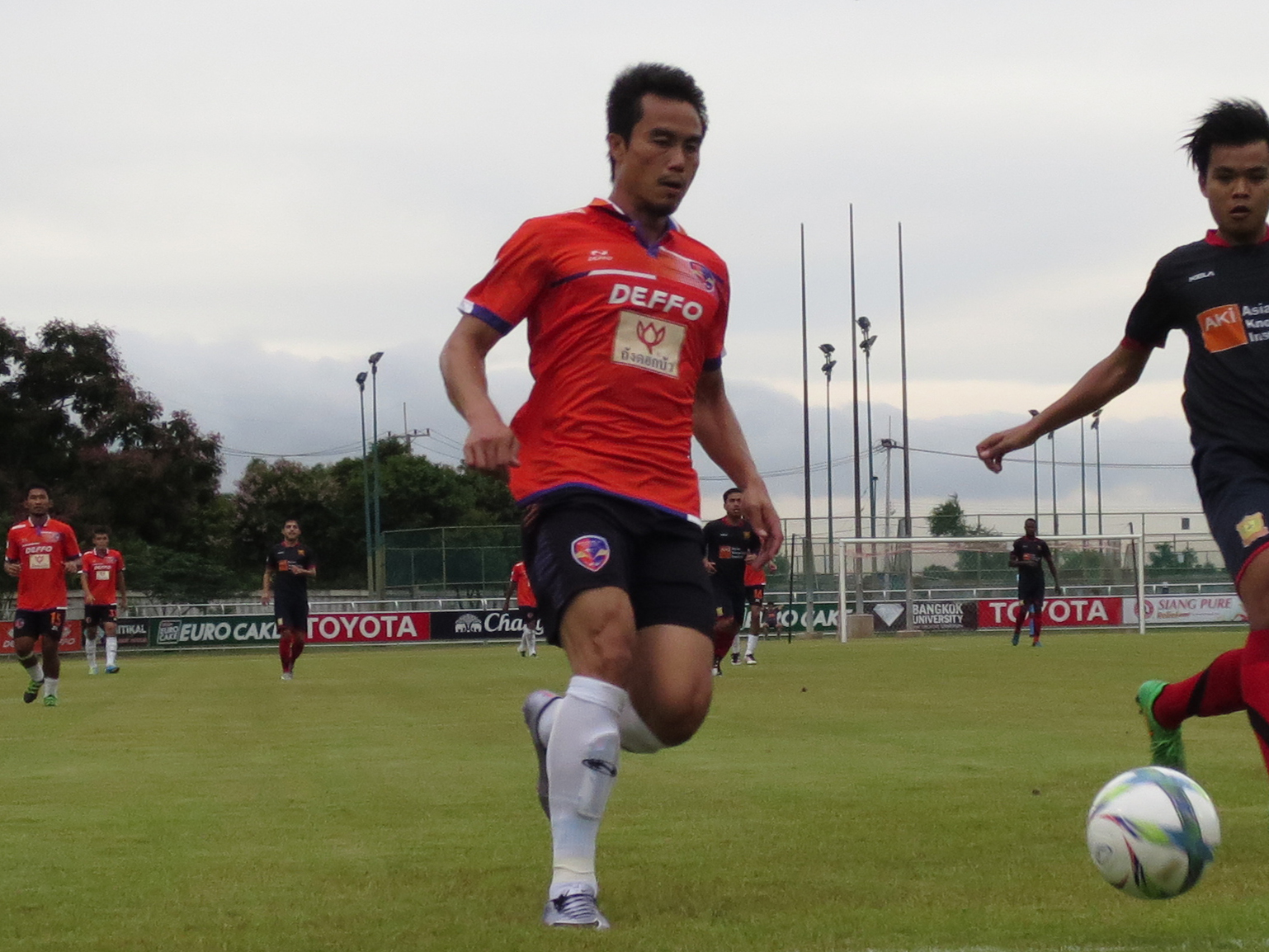

Personal information
- Full name: Khampheng Sayavutthi
- Date of birth: 19 July 1986 (age 40)
- Place of birth: Vientiane, Laos
- Height: 1.78 m (5 ft 10 in)
- Position: Striker

Youth career
- YOTHA FC (MCTPC FC)

Senior career*
Years	Team	Apps	(Gls)
2010	YOTHA FC (MCTPC FC)	18	(16)
2011–2012	Khonkaen	26	(9)
2013–2014	Angthong	16	(10)
2015	Ayutthaya	9	(3)
2015–2016	Lanexang United	4	(2)
2017	BU Deffo	17	(2)
Total		90	(42)

International career^{‡}
2009	Laos U23	3	(1)
2010–2017	Laos	49	(15)
- * Club domestic league appearances and goals as of June 07, 2014 ‡ National team caps and goals as of January 30, 2017

Khampheng Sayavutthi (ຄໍາແພງ ໄຊຍະວຸດທິ; born 19 July 1986 in Vientiane), is a Laotian former football player who played for the Laos national team.

In Laos' first ever game at the 2014 AFC Challenge Cup, Sayavutthi scored with a bicycle kick against Turkmenistan to give his country the lead, although Turkmenistan later came back to win 5-1.

In February 2020, the Asian Football Confederation banned him from football for life for match-fixing.

== International career ==
=== International goals ===
Scores and results list Laos' goal tally first.

No	Date	Venue	Opponent	Score	Result	Competition
1.	3 July 2011	New Laos National Stadium, Vientiane, Laos	Cambodia	2–0	6–2	2014 FIFA World Cup qualification
2.	11 October 2012	Thuwunna Stadium, Yangon, Myanmar	Brunei	2–1	3–1	2012 AFF Championship qualification
3.	25 November 2012	Bukit Jalil National Stadium, Kuala Lumpur, Malaysia	Indonesia	1–0	2–2	2012 AFF Championship
4.	1 December 2012	Shah Alam Stadium, Shah Alam, Malaysia	Singapore	1–0	3–4	2012 AFF Championship
5.	1 December 2012	Shah Alam Stadium, Shah Alam, Malaysia	Singapore	3–4	3–4	2012 AFF Championship
6.	6 March 2013	New Laos National Stadium, Vientiane, Laos	Afghanistan	1–0	1–1	2014 AFC Challenge Cup qualification
7.	20 May 2014	Addu Football Stadium, Addu City, Maldives	Turkmenistan	1–0	1–5	2014 AFC Challenge Cup
8.	12 October 2014	New Laos National Stadium, Vientiane, Laos	Cambodia	2–0	3–2	2014 AFF Championship qualification
9.	12 October 2014	New Laos National Stadium, Vientiane, Laos	Cambodia	3–2	3–2	2014 AFF Championship qualification
10.	14 October 2014	New Laos National Stadium, Vientiane, Laos	Brunei	3–1	4–2	2014 AFF Championship qualification
11.	22 November 2014	Mỹ Đình National Stadium, Hanoi, Vietnam	Philippines	1–0	1–4	2014 AFF Championship
12.	28 November 2014	Hàng Đẫy Stadium, Hanoi, Vietnam	Indonesia	1–2	1–5	2014 AFF Championship
13.	11 June 2015	New Laos National Stadium, Vientiane, Laos	Myanmar	1–0	2–2	2018 FIFA World Cup qualification
14.	11 June 2015	New Laos National Stadium, Vientiane, Laos	Myanmar	2–1	2–2	2018 FIFA World Cup qualification
15.	13 October 2015	Suphachalasai Stadium, Bangkok, Thailand	Myanmar	1–0	1–3	2018 FIFA World Cup qualification
