= 2013–14 Bahraini FA Cup =

Tournament details
- Teams: 19

Final positions
- Champions: Bahrain Riffa Club
- Runners-up: Bahrain Club

The 2013–14 Bahraini FA Cup or more commonly known locally as the BFA Cup is the 8th edition of this Association football tournament, and the first since 2009. Al-Muharraq are therefore going into the competition as defending champions.

This edition will feature two groups of 8 and 9 teams respectively with the top two teams advancing to the semi-final stage. Each group sees the teams play each other once. Games are generally played during international breaks and feature all teams from the top two tiers of Bahraini football.

The competition is, in theory, used to blood new up and coming talent but has had its fair share of disciplinary incidents including a result awarded due to the ineligibility of players used.

== Group stage ==
=== Group A ===
Team	GP	W	D	L	GS	GA	GD	Pts
Riffa	8	7	1	0	21	3	+18	22
Malkiya	8	6	0	2	19	14	+5	18
Busaiteen	8	5	1	2	19	7	+12	16
Manama	8	5	1	2	16	11	+5	16
East Riffa	8	4	1	3	11	10	+1	13
Al Ittihad	7	2	0	5	8	12	-4	6
Budaiya	7	1	1	5	12	20	-8	4
Al Shabab	7	1	0	6	9	19	-10	3
Qalali	7	0	1	6	6	25	-19	1

==== Results ====
10 October 2013
Manama	2–0	Al Ittihad
Riffa	2–1	Budaiya
Al Shabab	5–2	Qalali
11 October 2013
Malkiya	2–1	East Riffa
5 November 2013
Busaiteen	1–0	Al Itihad
Riffa	3–0	Qalali
Al Shabab	2–3	Malkiya
6 November 2013
Manama	3–1	East Riffa
16 November 2013
Busaiteen	0–1	East Riffa
Budaiya	4–2	Qalali
Manama	4–0	Al Shabab
17 November 2013
Riffa	2–1	Malkiya
19 December 2013
Riffa	6–0	Manama
Budaiya	2–5	Malkiya
Al Ittihad	0–2	East Riffa
20 December 2013
Busaiteen	2–1	Al Shabab
28 December 2013
Al Ittihad	4–0	Al Shabab
29 December 2013
Budaiya	2–2	Manama
30 December 2013
Busaiteen	0–0	Riffa
Qalali	0–2	Malkiya
3 January 2014
East Riffa	2–1	Al Shabab
Al Ittihad	0–4	Riffa
4 January 2014
Budaiya	1–4	Busaiteen
Qalali	0–3	Manama
28 February 2014
Al Ittihad	3–1	Budaiya
Malkiya	2–1	Manama
1 March 2014
Qalali	1–7	Busaiteen
4 March 2014
Budaiya	1–2	East Riffa
Busaiteen	5–2	Malkiya
Al Ittihad	P–P	Qalali
7 March 2014
Al Shabab	0–2	Riffa
21 March 2014
Malkiya	2–1	Al Ittihad
2 April 2014
Manama	1–0	Busaiteen
9 April 2014
East Riffa	1–1	Qalali
21 April 2014
Al Shabab	P–P	Budaiya
25 April 2014
East Riffa	1–2	Riffa

=== Group B ===
Team	GP	W	D	L	GS	GA	GD	Pts
Bahrain Club	9	7	1	1	21	11	+10	22
Al Hala Muharraq	9	6	1	2	22	12	+10	18
Sitra	9	4	3	2	20	13	+7	15
Muharraq	9	4	3	2	12	9	+3	15
Al Hadd	9	3	4	2	21	13	+8	13
Al Ahli	9	4	1	4	18	21	-3	13
Ittifaq Maqaba	8	2	1	5	8	16	-8	7
Tadamun Buri	9	2	1	6	8	19	-11	7
Al Najma	8	1	3	4	10	17	-7	6
Issa Town	9	0	4	5	8	17	-9	4

== Semi-finals ==
6 May 2014
16:30

Bahrain Club	2 – 0	Malkiya

6 May 2014
17:05

Riffa	2 – 1	Al Hala Muharraq

== Final ==
18 May 2014
15:45

Riffa	2 – 0	Bahrain Club
