= AFC Solidarity Cup =

International football competition in Asia

- Organiser(s): AFC
- Founded: 2016; 10 years ago
- Abolished: 2023; 3 years ago
- Region: Asia
- Teams: 10
- Last champions: Nepal (1st title)
- Most championships: Nepal (1 title)

The AFC Solidarity Cup was an international football competition for Asian Football Confederation (AFC) member countries who were out of the continental qualifiers at early stage. The tournament was created following the termination of the AFC Challenge Cup.

== Format ==
The competition featured 10 national teams, where each team was guaranteed a minimum of 4 matches. The first edition took place in November 2016. The second edition, scheduled for November and December 2020, was cancelled due to COVID-19 pandemic in Asia and later abolished.

The tournament was abolished by the AFC on 27 November 2023, because the revamped qualification format for the FIFA World Cup and the AFC Asian Cup dovetailed with the initial objectives of the AFC Solidarity Cup, as there was now more exposure for lower-ranked teams to compete over a longer period of time.

== Results ==
| Year | Host | Final | | | Third place match | | | Number of teams |
| Year | Host | Champions | Score | Runners-up | Third place | Score | Fourth place | Number of teams |
|---|---|---|---|---|---|---|---|---|
| 2016 | Malaysia | Nepal | 1–0 | Macau | Laos | 3–2 | Brunei | 7 (Note: The 2016 AFC Solidarity Cup was supposed to feature nine teams in the competition. However, Pakistan withdrew after the draw and Bangladesh withdrew after losing in the play-off round.) |
| 2020 | Cancelled due to COVID-19 pandemic | | | | | | | |

=== Successful national teams ===
| Team | Champion | Runners-up | Third place | Fourth place |
|---|---|---|---|---|
| Nepal | 1 (2016) | | | |
| Macau | | 1 (2016) | | |
| Laos | | | 1 (2016) | |
| Brunei | | | | 1 (2016) |

=== Champions by region ===
| Federation (Region) | Champion(s) | Number |
|---|---|---|
| EAFF (East Asia) | | |
| WAFF (West Asia) | | |
| CAFA (Central Asia) | | |
| AFF (Southeast Asia) | | |
| SAFF (South Asia) | Nepal | 1 title |

== Participating nations ==
Legend

- 1st — Champion
- 2nd — Runner-up
- 3rd — Third place
- 4th — Fourth place
- SF — Semifinals

- QF — Quarterfinals
- GS — Group stage
- Q — Qualified for the upcoming tournament
- × — Did not enter; withdrew; banned
- ‡ — Tournament was unavailable for the nation that year

The number of teams in each of the final tournaments is shown.

| Teams | (Malaysia) 2016 (7) | 2020 (Cancelled) | Years |
|---|---|---|---|
| Bangladesh | × | × | 0 |
| Bhutan | ‡ | × | 0 |
| Brunei | 4th | × | 1 |
| Laos | 3rd | × | 1 |
| Macau | 2nd | × | 1 |
| Mongolia | GS | × | 1 |
| Nepal | 1st | × | 1 |
| Pakistan | × | × | 0 |
| Sri Lanka | GS | × | 1 |
| Timor-Leste | GS | × | 1 |

== Summary ==
| Rank | Team | Part | M | W | D | L | GF | GA | GD | Points |
|---|---|---|---|---|---|---|---|---|---|---|
| 1 | Laos | 1 | 5 | 3 | 1 | 1 | 11 | 9 | +2 | 10 |
| 2 | Nepal | 1 | 4 | 2 | 2 | 0 | 6 | 2 | +4 | 8 |
| 3 | Macau | 1 | 5 | 2 | 2 | 1 | 8 | 5 | +3 | 8 |
| 4 | Brunei | 1 | 4 | 1 | 1 | 2 | 7 | 7 | 0 | 4 |
| 5 | Mongolia | 1 | 3 | 1 | 0 | 2 | 3 | 5 | -2 | 3 |
| 6 | Sri Lanka | 1 | 3 | 0 | 1 | 2 | 2 | 5 | -3 | 1 |
| 7 | Timor-Leste | 1 | 2 | 0 | 1 | 1 | 0 | 4 | -4 | 1 |

- The Northern Mariana Islands made their AFC Solidarity Cup debut after having been approved by the AFC to participate (the Northern Mariana Islands is an associate member of the AFC).

=== Awards ===
| Tournament | Most Valuable Player | Top scorer(s) | Goals | Fair play award |
|---|---|---|---|---|
| 2016 | (Macau) Leong Ka Hang | (Brunei) Shahrazen Said (Laos) Xaysongkham Champathong (Macau) Niki Torrão | 4 | Laos |

=== Winning coaches ===
| Year | Team | Coaches |
|---|---|---|
| 2016 | Nepal | (Japan) Koji Gyotoku |

== See also ==
- FIFA Series
- FIFA ASEAN Cup
