= Asikur Rahuman =

Sri Lankan footballer

Personal information
- Full name: Asikur Rahuman Mohamed Alawadeen
- Date of birth: 31 December 1993 (age 32)
- Place of birth: Kurunegala
- Height: 1.73 m (5 ft 8 in)
- Position: Defender

Team information
- Current team: Pelicans

Senior career*
Years	Team	Apps	(Gls)
2014–	Pelicans		

International career^{‡}
2014–	Sri Lanka	17	(1)
- * Club domestic league appearances and goals ‡ National team caps and goals as of 15 November 2016

Asikur Rahuman Mohamed Alawadeen is a Sri Lankan international footballer who plays as a defender.

== International career ==
=== International goals ===
Scores and results list Sri Lanka's goal tally first.

Goal	Date	Venue	Opponent	Score	Result	Competition
1.	3 November 2016	Sarawak State Stadium, Kuching, Malaysia	Laos	1–2	1–2	2016 AFC Solidarity Cup
