= Lao Pak Kin =

Macau footballer

Personal information
- Date of birth: 24 May 1984 (age 42)
- Place of birth: Macau
- Position: Defender

Senior career*
Years	Team	Apps	(Gls)
-2004	Heng Tai		
2004-2006	C.D. Monte Carlo		
2006-2008	G.D. Lam Pak		
2008-2011	Windsor Arch Ka I	25+	(4+)
2012	S.L. Benfica de Macau	15	(0)
2013-2015	Windsor Arch Ka I	36	(1)
2016-2018	Windsor Arch Ka I	25	(0)

International career
2005-2017	Macau	30	(1)
- * Club domestic league appearances and goals

Lao Pak Kin (Chinese: 劉柏堅; born 24 May 1984 in Macau) is a Macau footballer.

== International goals ==
Scores and results are list Macau's goal tally first.

No.	Date	Venue	Opponent	Score	Result	Competition
1.	6 November 2016	Sarawak Stadium, Kuching, Malaysia	Laos	1–1	1–4	2016 AFC Solidarity Cup
