= 2019 AFC Asian Cup qualification – play-off round =

Tournament details
- Dates: 2 June – 11 October 2016
- Teams: 11 (from 1 confederation)

Tournament statistics
- Matches played: 16
- Goals scored: 46 (2.88 per match)
- Attendance: 95,310 (5,957 per match)
- Top scorer(s): (India) Jeje Lalpekhlua (Malaysia) Hazwan Bakri (3 goals each)

The play-off round of the 2019 AFC Asian Cup qualification was played from 2 June to 11 October 2016.

== Format ==
A total of 11 teams (the four lowest-ranked fourth-placed teams and the seven fifth-placed teams of the Asian Cup qualifying second round) competed in the play-off round. Originally, 12 teams were supposed to compete, but there were only seven instead of eight fifth-placed teams after Indonesia were disqualified due to FIFA suspension.

The play-off round consisted of two rounds of home-and-away two-legged play-off matches to determine the final eight qualifiers for the Asian Cup qualifying third round:

- Round 1: The ten highest-seeded teams were drawn into five ties. The five winners advanced to the Asian Cup qualifying third round, while the five losers entered Round 2.
- Round 2: The six teams (the lowest-seeded team and the five Round 1 losers) were drawn into three ties. The three winners advanced to the Asian Cup qualifying third round, while the three losers were eligible to enter the AFC Solidarity Cup.

The five Round 1 winners and three Round 2 winners joined the 16 teams which advanced directly from the Asian Cup qualifying second round to the third round, to compete for the final 12 slots in the 2019 AFC Asian Cup.

The three Round 2 losers joined the six teams which lost in the Asian Cup qualifying first round, to compete for the 2016 AFC Solidarity Cup.

== Qualified teams ==
Group (second round)	Fourth place (Worst 4)	Fifth place
A	Malaysia	Timor-Leste
B	Tajikistan	Bangladesh
C	Maldives	Bhutan
D	—	India
E	—	Cambodia
F	Chinese Taipei	—
G	—	Laos
H	—	Yemen

== Seeding ==
The draw for the play-off round was held on 7 April 2016, 15:00 MYT (UTC+8), at the AFC House in Kuala Lumpur, Malaysia.

The teams were seeded based on their results in the Asian Cup qualifying second round.

In Round 1, each tie contained a team from Pot 1 and a team from Pot 2, with the team from Pot 1 hosting the first leg.

In Round 2, there was no seeding. As the draw was held before Round 1 was played, the identities of the Round 1 losers were not known at the time of the draw.

Round 1		Round 2
Pot 1	Pot 2	Round 2
1. Tajikistan; 2. Chinese Taipei; 3. Maldives; 4. Malaysia; 5. Laos	6. India; 7. Yemen; 8. Timor-Leste; 9. Bangladesh; 10. Cambodia	11. Bhutan

== Matches ==
Each tie was played on a home-and-away two-legged basis. The away goals rule, extra time (away goals did not apply in extra time) and a penalty shoot-out were used to decide the winner if necessary (Regulations Article 10.3).

=== Round 1 ===
The first legs were played on 2 June, and the second legs were played on 6 and 7 June 2016.

Team 1	Agg.	Team 2	1st leg	2nd leg
Chinese Taipei	2–4	Cambodia	2–2	0–2
Maldives	0–4	Yemen	0–2	0–2
Tajikistan	6–0	Bangladesh	5–0	1–0
Malaysia	6–0	Timor-Leste	3–0 (Forfeited)	3–0 (Forfeited)
Laos	1–7	India	0–1	1–6

Note: Timor-Leste were ordered by the AFC to forfeit both matches against Malaysia due to the use of falsified documents for their players. Both matches originally ended as 3–0 wins to Malaysia.

2 June 2016
19:00 UTC+8

Chinese Taipei	2–2	Cambodia
Huang Wei-min 6'; Chen Po-liang 22'	Report	Sokpheng 8'; Chhoeun 32'

National Stadium, Kaohsiung
Attendance: 3,564
Referee: Pranjal Banerjee (India)
7 June 2016
19:00 UTC+7

Cambodia	2–0	Chinese Taipei
Pheng 7'; Mony Udom 60' (pen.)	Report

Olympic Stadium, Phnom Penh
Attendance: 50,000
Referee: Ahmed Al-Ali (Jordan)

Cambodia won 4–2 on aggregate and advanced to the Asian Cup qualifying third round. Chinese Taipei entered Round 2.

2 June 2016
21:00 UTC+5

Maldives	0–2	Yemen
	Report	Al-Hagri 31'; Al-Worafi 80'

National Football Stadium, Malé
Attendance: 2,600
Referee: Kim Dae-yong (South Korea)
7 June 2016
22:00 UTC+3

Yemen	2–0	Maldives
Al-Matari 24'; Samooh 54' (o.g.)	Report

Grand Hamad Stadium, Doha (Qatar) (Note: Yemen played their Round 1 home match in Qatar due to security concerns from the Saudi Arabian-led intervention in Yemen.)
Attendance: 200
Referee: Sivakorn Pu-udom (Thailand)

Yemen won 4–0 on aggregate and advanced to the Asian Cup qualifying third round. Maldives entered Round 2.

2 June 2016
20:00 UTC+5

Tajikistan	5–0	Bangladesh
J. Ergashev 19', 30'; Umarbayev 33'; D. Ergashev 49'; Sharipov 72'	Report

Pamir Stadium, Dushanbe
Attendance: 8,332
Referee: Hanna Hattab (Syria)
7 June 2016
16:30 UTC+6

Bangladesh	0–1	Tajikistan
	Report	Nazarov 8'

Bangabandhu National Stadium, Dhaka
Attendance: 800
Referee: Hussein Abo Yehia (Lebanon)

Tajikistan won 6–0 on aggregate and advanced to the Asian Cup qualifying third round. Bangladesh entered Round 2.

2 June 2016
20:45 UTC+8

Malaysia	3–0 Forfeited	Timor-Leste
Hazwan 16', 21'; Amri 85'	Report

Tan Sri Dato Haji Hassan Yunos Stadium, Johor Bahru
Attendance: 3,600
Referee: Hiroyuki Kimura (Japan)
6 June 2016
22:00 UTC+8

Timor-Leste	0–3 Forfeited	Malaysia
	Report	Jones 16'; Hazwan 58'; S. Chanturu 68'

Tan Sri Dato Haji Hassan Yunos Stadium, Johor Bahru (Malaysia) (Note: Timor-Leste played their Round 1 home match in Malaysia.)
Attendance: 1,145
Referee: Ho Wai Sing (Hong Kong)

Malaysia won 6–0 on aggregate and advanced to the Asian Cup qualifying third round. Timor-Leste entered Round 2.

2 June 2016
18:30 UTC+7

Laos	0–1	India
	Report	Lalpekhlua 55'

Lao National Stadium, Vientiane
Attendance: 1,200
Referee: Omar Al-Yaqoubi (Oman)
7 June 2016
19:00 UTC+5:30

India	6–1	Laos
Lalpekhlua 43', 74'; Passi 45+1'; Jhingan 48'; Rafique 83'; Cardozo 87'	Report	Sihavong 16'

Indira Gandhi Athletic Stadium, Guwahati
Attendance: 2,500
Referee: Jansen Foo (Singapore)

India won 7–1 on aggregate and advanced to the Asian Cup qualifying third round. Laos entered Round 2.

=== Round 2 ===
The first legs were played on 6 September and 8 October, and the second legs were played on 10 and 11 October 2016.

Team 1	Agg.	Team 2	1st leg	2nd leg
Maldives	5–1	Laos	4–0	1–1
Bangladesh	1–3	Bhutan	0–0	1–3
Timor-Leste	2–4	Chinese Taipei	1–2	1–2

6 September 2016
21:00 UTC+5

Maldives	4–0	Laos
Fasir 15'; Ashfaq 62', 90+3'; Niyaz 87'	Report

National Football Stadium, Malé
Attendance: 4,700
Referee: Masaaki Toma (Japan)
11 October 2016
18:00 UTC+7

Laos	1–1	Maldives
Sihavong 80'	Report	Nashid 90+1'

Lao National Stadium, Vientiane
Attendance: 1,200
Referee: Dmitry Mashentsev (Kyrgyzstan)

Maldives won 5–1 on aggregate and advanced to the Asian Cup qualifying third round. Laos were eligible to enter the Solidarity Cup.

6 September 2016
19:00 UTC+6

Bangladesh	0–0	Bhutan
	Report

Bangabandhu National Stadium, Dhaka
Attendance: 5,000
Referee: Çarymyrat Kurbanow (Turkmenistan)
10 October 2016
18:00 UTC+6

Bhutan	3–1	Bangladesh
J. Dorji 4'; C. Gyeltshen 26', 76'	Report	Mamunul 63'

Changlimithang Stadium, Thimphu
Attendance: 6,120
Referee: Khurram Shahzad (Pakistan)

Bhutan won 3–1 on aggregate and advanced to the Asian Cup qualifying third round. Bangladesh were eligible to enter the Solidarity Cup.

8 October 2016
19:00 UTC+8

Timor-Leste	1–2	Chinese Taipei
Gama 5'	Report	Wu Chun-ching 8', 38'

National Stadium, Kaohsiung (Taiwan) (Note: Timor-Leste played their Round 2 home match in Taiwan.)
Attendance: 2,849
Referee: Võ Minh Trí (Vietnam)
11 October 2016
19:00 UTC+8

Chinese Taipei	2–1	Timor-Leste
Chen Yi-wei 10'; Chen Hao-wei 75'	Report	Oliveira 85'

National Stadium, Kaohsiung
Attendance: 1,000
Referee: Kim Hee-gon (South Korea)

Chinese Taipei won 4–2 on aggregate and advanced to the Asian Cup qualifying third round. Timor-Leste were eligible to enter the Solidarity Cup.

== Goalscorers ==
There were 46 goals scored in 16 matches, for an average of 2.88 goals per match.

3 goals

- (India) Jeje Lalpekhlua
- (Malaysia) Hazwan Bakri

2 goals

- (Bhutan) Chencho Gyeltshen
- (Chinese Taipei) Wu Chun-ching
- (Laos) Khonesavanh Sihavong
- (Maldives) Ali Ashfaq
- (Tajikistan) Jahongir Ergashev

1 goal

- (Bangladesh) Mamunul Islam
- (Bhutan) Jigme Dorji
- (Cambodia) Chhin Chhoeun
- (Cambodia) Prak Mony Udom
- (Cambodia) Hong Pheng
- (Cambodia) Keo Sokpheng
- (Chinese Taipei) Chen Hao-wei
- (Chinese Taipei) Chen Po-liang
- (Chinese Taipei) Chen Yi-wei
- (Chinese Taipei) Huang Wei-min
- (India) Fulganco Cardozo
- (India) Sandesh Jhingan
- (India) Sumit Passi
- (India) Mohammed Rafique
- (Malaysia) Chanturu Suppiah
- (Malaysia) Khair Jones
- (Malaysia) Mohd Amri Yahyah
- (Maldives) Ali Fasir
- (Maldives) Hussain Niyaz Mohamed
- (Maldives) Ahmed Nashid
- (Tajikistan) Davron Ergashev
- (Tajikistan) Akhtam Nazarov
- (Tajikistan) Umedzhon Sharipov
- (Tajikistan) Parvizdzhon Umarbayev
- (Timor-Leste) Rufino Gama
- (Timor-Leste) José Oliveira
- (Yemen) Ayman Al-Hagri
- (Yemen) Abdulwasea Al-Matari
- (Yemen) Akram Al-Worafi

1 own goal

- (Maldives) Ali Samooh (against Yemen)
