= Khonesavanh Sihavong =

Laotian footballer

Personal information
- Full name: Khonesavanh Sihavong
- Date of birth: 10 October 1994 (age 32)
- Place of birth: Laos
- Height: 1.71 m (5 ft 7 in)
- Position: Midfielder

Team information
- Current team: Lao Police Club
- Number: 9

Senior career*
Years	Team	Apps	(Gls)
2012–2014	Lao Police Club		
2015–17	Hoang Anh Attapeu F.C.		
2017–	Lao Police Club		

International career^{‡}
2012–	Laos	27	(5)
- * Club domestic league appearances and goals ‡ National team caps and goals as of 7 June 2016

Khonesavanh Sihavong (born 10 October 1994) is a Laotian footballer, who plays for Hoang Anh Attapeu F.C and the Laos national football team. He was a part of the national team in the 2012 AFF Suzuki Cup.

== International ==
=== International goals ===
As of match played 7 June 2016. Laos score listed first, score column indicates score after each Sihavong goal.

International goals by date, venue, cap, opponent, score, result and competition
No.	Date	Venue	Cap	Opponent	Score	Result	Competition
1	28 November 2012	Bukit Jalil National Stadium, Kuala Lumpur, Malaysia	7	Malaysia	1–1	1–4	2012 AFF Championship
2	7 June 2013	New Laos National Stadium, Vientiane, Laos	10	Singapore	2–3	2–5	Friendly
3	13 May 2014	National Football Stadium, Malé, Maldives	12	Maldives	1–2	1–7	Friendly
4	12 October 2014	New Laos National Stadium, Vientiane, Laos	16	Cambodia	1–0	3–2	2014 AFF Championship qualification
5	7 June 2016	Indira Gandhi Athletic Stadium, Guwahati, India	27	India	1–0	1–6	2019 AFC Asian Cup qualification
