= Phatthana Syvilay =

Laotian footballer

Phatthana Syvilay (born 4 October 1990) is a Laotian football player who plays for Yotha in Lao League and the Laos national football team.

== International goals ==
No.	Date	Venue	Opponent	Score	Result	Competition
1.	18 October 2016	Olympic Stadium, Phnom Penh, Cambodia	Timor-Leste	1–0	2–1	2016 AFF Championship qualification
2.	21 October 2016	RSN Stadium, Phnom Penh, Cambodia	Brunei	2–1	4–3	2016 AFF Championship qualification
3.	21 October 2016	RSN Stadium, Phnom Penh, Cambodia	Brunei	3–1	4–3	2016 AFF Championship qualification
4.	21 October 2016	RSN Stadium, Phnom Penh, Cambodia	Brunei	4–2	4–3	2016 AFF Championship qualification
