= Heman Gurung =

Nepalese footballer (born 1996)

Heman Gurung हेमन गुरुङ
Personal information
- Full name: Heman Gurung
- Date of birth: 27 February 1996 (age 30)
- Place of birth: Nepal
- Height: 1.63 m (5 ft 4 in)
- Position: Midfielder

Team information
- Current team: Himalayan Sherpa Club

Youth career
- Takshashila Academy

Senior career*
Years	Team	Apps	(Gls)
2013–	Himalayan Sherpa Club		

International career^{‡}
2011	Nepal U17	6	(1)
2013	Nepal U20	4	(1)
2016	Nepal U23	9	(0)
2015–	Nepal	13	(0)
- * Club domestic league appearances and goals as of 19:19, 18 April 2017 (UTC) ‡ National team caps and goals as of 19:19, 13 July 2017 (UTC)

Heman Gurung (Nepali: हेमन गुरुङ; born 27 February 1996) is a Nepalese international footballer who plays as a midfielder for Himalayan Sherpa Club and the Nepal national football team.

== Early life and career ==
Gurung made headlines in India when, in 2010, he scored nine goals in a 25–0 victory over the Lakshadweep Government High School for his own school, the Takshashila Academy. He has played for the Himalayan Sherpa Club since at least 2013.

== International career ==
Gurung has represented Nepal at under-17, under-22 and senior level; making his full debut in a 1–0 loss to the Bangladesh team in 2015. His first taste of competitive international football came in the 2015 SAFF Championship, where he played in matches against the Sri Lanka national team and India national team.

=== International ===
As of matches played 13 July 2017.

National team	Year	Apps	Goals
Nepal	2015	3	0
Nepal	2016	7	0
Nepal	2017	3	0
Total		13	0
