= Sarawak Stadium =

Stadium in Malaysia

Coordinates: 1°35′19″N 110°21′37″E

Sarawak Stadium (Tan Sri Haji Adenan Satem Stadium)
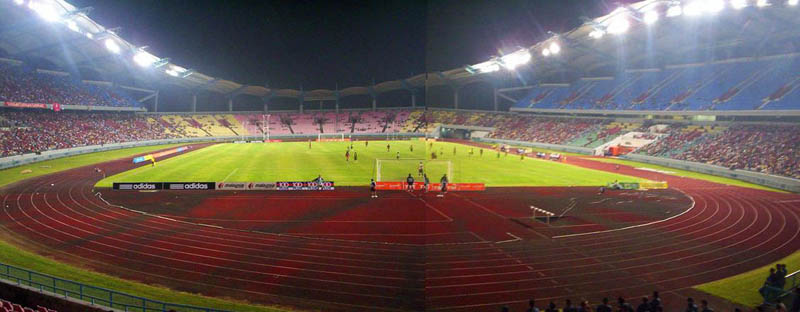
- Interactive map of Sarawak Stadium (Tan Sri Haji Adenan Satem Stadium)
- Location: Kuching, Sarawak, Malaysia
- Owner: Government of Sarawak
- Operator: Perbadanan Stadium Sarawak (Sarawak Stadium Corporation)
- Capacity: 50,000
- Surface: Grass

Construction
- Groundbreaking: 1995
- Opened: 17 June 1997
- Cost: MYR 120 million

Tenants
- Sarawak (until 2021); Sarawak FA President and Youth (until 2021); Kuching City F.C. (2015 – now); Sarawak United FC (2020 – 2023)

Sarawak Stadium (also known as Tan Sri Haji Adenan Satem Stadium) is a multi-purpose stadium in Kuching, Malaysia. It is currently used mostly for football matches, athletics, live concert events, conferences, and formal events. The stadium has a capacity of 50,000 spectators.

== History ==
It was built in 1995 for the 1997 FIFA World Youth Championship. The stadium also hosted the famous ''South American derby'' between Brazil and Argentina during the 1997 FIFA World Youth Championship. Notable names who played in the stadium include Thierry Henry, Nicolas Anelka, David Trezeguet, Mikaël Silvestre, William Gallas, Walter Samuel, Esteban Cambiasso, Juan Román Riquelme, Pablo Aimar, Lionel Scaloni, Helton and Mickaël Landreau.

The inaugural edition of the AFC Solidarity Cup was hosted in the stadium in 2016.

== Facilities ==
The stadium was completed in April 1997, and is one of Asia's world-class stadiums. It consists of 4 levels, with an electronic multimedia scoreboard, manila grass football field with patented drainage and synthetic running track.

The stadium is also equipped with:

- VIP driveway
- 320 parking lots
- stadium office
- gymnasiums
- changing and massage rooms
- workshops
- canteen
- security control centre
- dope testing area
- medical clinics
- saunas
- prayer rooms
- facilities for the disabled and VVIPs.

== Notable matches ==
- Quarter-final match between Brazil and Argentina during the 1997 FIFA World Youth Championship
- The 1998 Charity Shield match between Sarawak FA and Selangor FA
- Quarter-final match of the 1998–99 Asian Cup Winners' Cup between Sarawak FA and Kashima Antlers of Japan.
- Fourth venue (Group D) to host matches of Malaysia, Chelsea, Bayern Munich and PSV Eindhoven for the Champions Youth Cup 2007.
- 2016 AFC Solidarity Cup

== International fixtures ==
=== 1997 FIFA World Youth Championship ===
| Date | Team | Score | Team | Round |
|---|---|---|---|---|
| 17 June 1997 | South Korea | 0–0 | South Africa | Group stage |
| 17 June 1997 | France | 0–3 | Brazil | Group stage |
| 20 June 1997 | South Korea | 2–4 | France | Group stage |
| 20 June 1997 | South Africa | 0–2 | Brazil | Group stage |
| 22 June 1997 | South Korea | 3–10 | Brazil | Group stage |
| 22 June 1997 | South Africa | 2–4 | France | Group stage |
| 25 June 1997 | Mexico | 1–2 | France | Round of 16 |
| 29 June 1997 | Argentina | 2–0 | Brazil | Quarter-finals |
| 2 July 1997 | Republic of Ireland | 0–1 | Argentina | Semi-finals |

== Other events ==
=== Live concert events ===
- Borneo Sonic Music Festival (2023, 2024)
