= Taha Ariffin Stadium =

Stadium in Kuching, Sarawak, Malaysia

Coordinates: 1°35′25″N 110°21′29″E

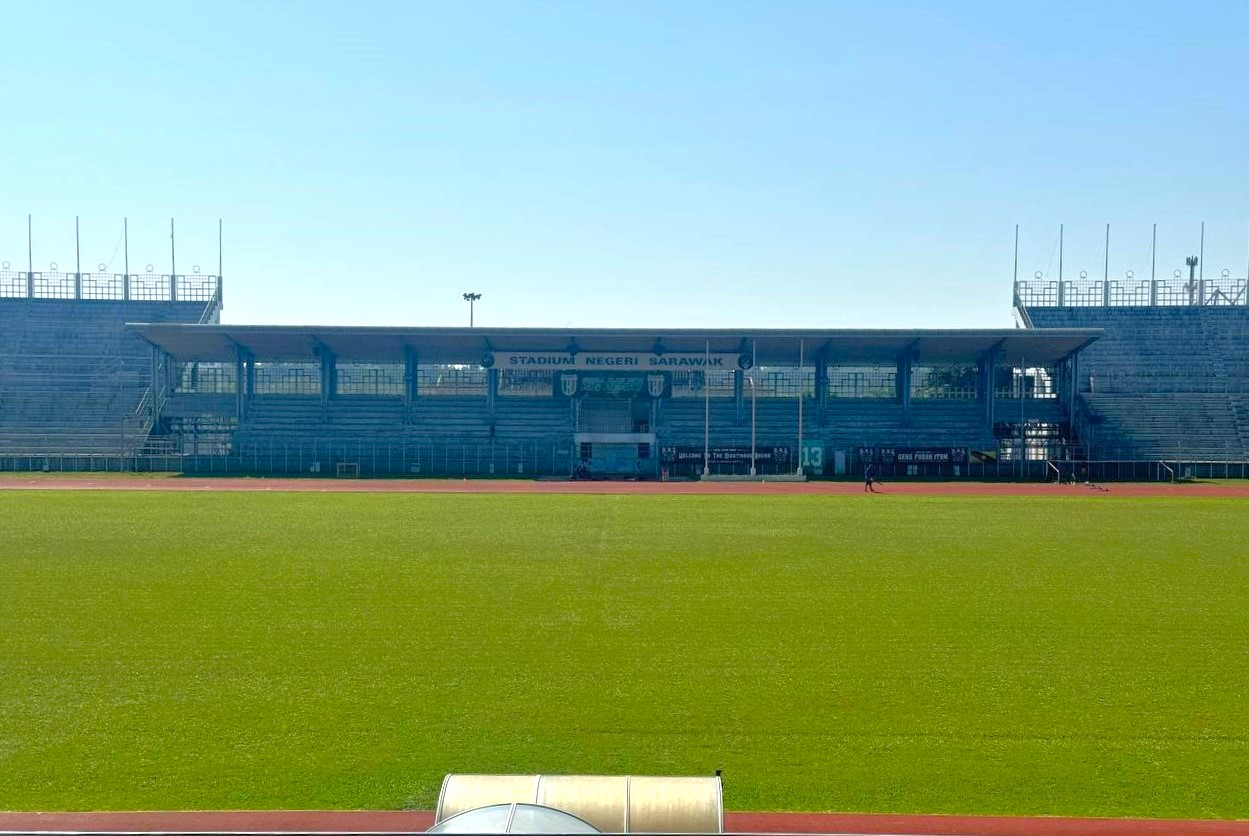
- Interactive map of Taha Ariffin Stadium
- Former names: Sarawak State Stadium (Stadium Negeri)
- Location: Kuching, Sarawak, Malaysia
- Owner: Sarawak Government; Kuching City F.C.
- Operator: Perbadanan Stadium Sarawak (Sarawak Stadium Corporation)
- Capacity: 17,584 (2026)
- Surface: Grass

Construction
- Groundbreaking: 1983
- Opened: 24 June 1991
- Cost: RM 22.6 millions. RM 7.0 millions (upgrade 2026)

Tenants
- Sarawak (until 2021); Kuching City (2015 – now); Sarawak United (2020 – 2023)

Taha Ariffin Stadium (Malay: Stadium Taha Ariffin) formerly State Stadium is a multi-purpose stadium in Kuching, Sarawak, Malaysia. It is currently used mostly for football matches. The stadium holds 30,000 people. The stadium hosted the Sukma Games in 1990, which Sarawak won. State Stadium is located in an area of 5 hectares in Petra Jaya. It was officially opened on 27 August 1983. The stadium is adjacent to the new Sarawak Stadium (also known as Tan Sri Haji Adenan Satem Stadium). This stadium also as the official home of the well-known local football club Kuching City F.C..

Taha Ariffin Stadium is the newly approved name for the Sarawak State Stadium (Stadium Negeri Sarawak), located within the Sarawak Sports Complex in Petra Jaya, Kuching. The Sarawak State Government officially announced this renaming on 19 May 2026.

This stadium venue is named in memory of the late Datuk Mohamad Taha Ariffin, who founded the Football Association of Sarawak (FAS) in 1974 and served as its president from 1997 to 2003. He was a pivotal figure in developing Sarawak football during its successful 1990s era.
