= Bangladesh national football team results (2000–2019) =

Match results (2000–2019)

This article lists the results of the Bangladesh national football team between 2000 and 2019.

== Results ==
=== 2000 ===
2 May 2000 MFF Golden Jubilee Tournament	Bangladesh	1–1	India	Malé, Maldives
	Mintu 5'	Report	Abbas Ali 53'	Stadium: Galolhu Rasmee Dhandu Stadium; Attendance: 7,000

4 May 2000 MFF Golden Jubilee Tournament	Maldives	1–1	Bangladesh	Malé, Maldives
	Fazeel 76'	Report	Mintu 7'	Stadium: Galolhu Rasmee Dhandu Stadium

7 May 2000 MFF Golden Jubilee Tournament	Sri Lanka	1–0	Bangladesh	Malé, Maldives
	Channa 35'	Report		Stadium: Galolhu Rasmee Dhandu Stadium

29 July 2000 Friendly	India	1–0	Bangladesh	Leicester, England
	Ancheri 10'	Report		Stadium: Filbert Street; Attendance: 3,000

=== 2001 ===
12 January 2001 Millennium Super Soccer Cup	Bosnia and Herzegovina	2–0	Bangladesh	Kochi, India
19:30 IST	Hota 55', 58'	Report		Stadium: Jawaharlal Nehru Stadium

8 February 2001 2002 World Cup qualification	Vietnam	0–0	Bangladesh	Dammam, Saudi Arabia
18:00 UTC+03		Report		Stadium: Prince Mohamed bin Fahd Stadium; Attendance: 3,099; Referee: Abdullah Al-Harrasi (Oman)

10 February 2001 2002 World Cup qualification	Bangladesh	0–3	Saudi Arabia	Dammam, Saudi Arabia
		Report	Al-Meshal 30', 85'; Al-Jaber 63'	Stadium: Prince Mohamed bin Fahd Stadium; Attendance: 5,000; Referee: Fareed Al-Marzouqi (United Arab Emirates)

12 February 2001 2002 World Cup qualification	Mongolia	0–3	Bangladesh	Dammam, Saudi Arabia
18:30 UTC+03		Report	Alfaz 41', 60'; Kanchan 85'	Stadium: Prince Mohamed bin Fahd Stadium; Attendance: 2,000; Referee: Abdulwahid Al-Khamesy (Yemen)

15 February 2001 2002 World Cup qualification	Bangladesh	0–4	Vietnam	Dammam, Saudi Arabia
20:30 UTC+03		Report	Nguyễn Văn Sỹ 65'; Nguyễn Hồng Sơn 73', 87' (pen.); Nguyễn Trung Vĩnh 77'	Stadium: Prince Mohamed bin Fahd Stadium; Attendance: 3,000; Referee: Saeed Bathaei Naeeni (Iran)

17 February 2001 2002 World Cup qualification	Saudi Arabia	6–0	Bangladesh	Dammam, Saudi Arabia
20:30 UTC+03	Harthi 5'; Al-Meshal 27', 28', 43'; Al-Dosari 33', 38'	Report		Stadium: Prince Mohamed bin Fahd Stadium; Attendance: 15,000; Referee: Abdullah Al-Harrasi (Oman)

19 February 2001 2002 World Cup qualification	Bangladesh	2–2	Mongolia	Dammam, Saudi Arabia
18:30 UTC+03	Sujan 80' (pen.), 82'	Report	Davaa 36'; Buman-Uchral 90+4'	Stadium: Prince Mohamed bin Fahd Stadium; Attendance: 2,099; Referee: Saeed Bathaei Naeeni (Iran)

27 April 2001 Friendly	Bangladesh	3–1	Bhutan	Dhaka, Bangladesh
	Amin Rana 31'; Moni 35'; Monwar 53'	Report	Chhetri	Stadium: Mirpur Stadium

=== 2003 ===
11 January 2003 2003 SAFF Gold Cup G.S	Bangladesh	1–0	Nepal	Dhaka, Bangladesh
	Alfaz 30'	Report; Report		Stadium: Bangabandhu National Stadium; Attendance: 55,000; Referee: Kunsuta Chaiwat (Thailand)

13 January 2003 2003 SAFF Gold Cup G.S	Bangladesh	1–0	Maldives	Dhaka, Bangladesh
	Joy 90'	Report; Report		Stadium: Bangabandhu National Stadium; Attendance: 20,000; Referee: AD Silva (Sri Lanka)

15 January 2003 2003 SAFF Gold Cup G.S	Bangladesh	3–0	Bhutan	Dhaka, Bangladesh
	Farhad 3', 54'; Kanchan 78'	Report; Report		Stadium: Bangabandhu National Stadium; Attendance: 15,000; Referee: Balu Sundar Raj (India)

18 January 2003 2003 SAFF Gold Cup S.F	Bangladesh	2–1 (a.e.t.)	India	Dhaka, Bangladesh
	Kanchan 77'; Munna 98'	Report; Report; Report	D'Cunha 81'	Stadium: Bangabandhu National Stadium; Referee: Kunsuta Chaiwat (Thailand)

20 January 2003 2003 SAFF Gold Cup Final	Bangladesh	1–1 (a.e.t.) (5–3 p)	Maldives	Dhaka, Bangladesh
	Kanchan 13'	Report; Report; Report	Umar 57'	Stadium: Bangabandhu National Stadium; Attendance: 46,000; Referee: AD Silva (Sri Lanka)
	Penalties
	Nazrul (penalty scored); Farhad (penalty scored); Hassan Al-Mamun (penalty scored); Hasan (penalty scored); Sujan (penalty scored)		(penalty scored) Naaz; (penalty missed) Lutfy; (penalty scored) Naseem; (penalty scored) Fazeel

27 March 2003 2004 Asian Cup qualification	Bangladesh	1–2	Laos	Kowloon, Hong Kong
	Farhad 90+1'	Report	Kholadeth 30'; Visay 37'	Stadium: Mong Kok Stadium

30 March 2003 2004 Asian Cup qualification	Hong Kong	2–2	Bangladesh	Kowloon, Hong Kong
	Au Wai Lun 44' (pen.); Szeto Man Chun 45'	Report	Titu 66'; Monwar 77'	Stadium: Mong Kok Stadium

26 November 2003 2006 World Cup qualification	Bangladesh	0–2	Tajikistan	Dhaka, Bangladesh
15:00 (UTC)		Report; Report	Hamidov 11'; Khakimov 51'	Stadium: Sher-e-Bangla Cricket Stadium; Attendance: 6,000; Referee: Virat Khanthachai (Thailand)

30 November 2003 2006 World Cup qualification	Tajikistan	2–0	Bangladesh	Dushanbe, Tajikistan
14:00	Kholmatov 15'; Rabiev 83'	Report; Report		Stadium: Pamir Stadium; Attendance: 12,000; Referee: Manuel Pereira (India)

=== 2005 ===
8 December 2005 2005 SAFF Gold Cup G.S	Bangladesh	3–0	Bhutan	Karachi, Pakistan
	Farhad 42', 58'; Ameli 85'	Report; Report		Stadium: Peoples Football Stadium; Attendance: 12,000; Referee: Perera Hettikam (Sri Lanka)

10 December 2005 2005 SAFF Gold Cup G.S	Bangladesh	2–0	Nepal	Karachi, Pakistan
	Kanchan 27', 87'	Report; Report		Stadium: Peoples Football Stadium; Referee: Al Yarimi Mukhtar (Yemen)

12 December 2005 2005 SAFF Gold Cup G.S	Bangladesh	1–1	India	Karachi, Pakistan
	Ameli 77'	Report; Report	Lawrence 17'	Stadium: Peoples Football Stadium; Referee: Hettikam Kanamge (Sri Lanka)

14 December 2005 2005 SAFF Gold Cup S.F	Bangladesh	1–0	Pakistan	Karachi, Pakistan
	Sujan 44' (pen.)	Report; Report		Stadium: Peoples Football Stadium; Attendance: 15,000; Referee: Ashfarian Khodadad (Iran)

17 December 2005 2005 SAFF Gold Cup Final	India	2–0	Bangladesh	Karachi, Pakistan
	Wadoo 33'; Bhutia 81'	Report; Report; Report		Stadium: Peoples Football Stadium; Referee: Ashfarian Khodadad (Iran)

22 December 2005 2007 Asian Cup qualification	Bangladesh	0–0	Pakistan	Dhaka, Bangladesh
		Report; Report		Stadium: Bangabandhu National Stadium; Attendance: 5,000; Referee: Rizwan Ul Haq (India)

26 December 2005 2007 Asian Cup qualification	Pakistan	0–1	Bangladesh	Karachi, Pakistan
		Report; Report	Titu 84'	Stadium: People's Sports Complex; Referee: Rizwan Ul Haq (India)

=== 2006 ===
22 February 2006 2007 Asian Cup qualification	Uzbekistan	5–0	Bangladesh	Tashkent, Uzbekistan
16:00 (UTC+05:00)	Geynrikh 10', 52'; Djeparov 24'; Shatskikh 34', 84'	Report; Report		Stadium: Pakhtakor Central Stadium; Attendance: 30,000; Referee: Abdulhameed Ebrahim (Bahrain)

1 March 2006 2007 Asian Cup qualification	Bangladesh	0–1	Hong Kong	Dhaka, Bangladesh
16:00 (BST)		Report; Report	Chan Siu Ki 82'	Stadium: Bangabandhu National Stadium; Attendance: 1,000; Referee: Subrata Sarkar (India)

1 April 2006 2006 AFC Challenge Cup G.S	Bangladesh	2–1	Cambodia	Dhaka, Bangladesh
18:00 (BST)	Alfaz 31'; Ameli 64'	Report; Report	C. Rithy 68'	Stadium: Bangabandhu National Stadium; Attendance: 35,000; Referee: Tan Hai (China PR)

3 April 2006 2006 AFC Challenge Cup G.S	Guam	0–3	Bangladesh	Dhaka, Bangladesh
18:00 (BST)		Report; Report	Ameli 49'; Abul 83', 85'	Stadium: Bangabandhu National Stadium; Attendance: 18,000; Referee: Win Cho (Myanmar)

5 April 2006 2006 AFC Challenge Cup G.S	Bangladesh	1–1	Palestine	Dhaka, Bangladesh
15:30 (BST)	Tapu 55'	Report; Report	Attal 30'	Stadium: Bangabandhu National Stadium; Attendance: 22,000; Referee: Hedayat Mombini (Iran)

10 April 2006 2006 AFC Challenge Cup Q.F	Tajikistan	6–1	Bangladesh	Dhaka, Bangladesh
15:30 (BST)	Rabimov 2'; Mahmudov 20'; Mukhidinov 31'; Hakimov 51'; Rabiev 65'; Nematov 81'	Report; Report	Alfaz 17'	Stadium: Bangabandhu National Stadium; Attendance: 15,000; Referee: Ala Abdul Kadir Nema (Iraq)

16 August 2006 2007 Asian Cup qualification	Bangladesh	1–4	Qatar	Chittagong, Bangladesh
16:00 (BST)	Arman 23'	Report; Report	Rizik 7' (pen.); Adel Lamy 36'; Ibrahim 38', 74'	Stadium: M. A. Aziz Stadium; Attendance: 7,000; Referee: Mukhtar Al Yarimi (Yemen)

6 September 2006 2007 Asian Cup qualification	Qatar	3–0	Bangladesh	Doha, Qatar
20:00 (AST)	Yasser 25'; Adel Lamy 30'; Shammari 52'	Report; Report		Stadium: Al Gharafa Stadium; Attendance: 500; Referee: Talaat Najm (Lebanon)

11 October 2006 2007 Asian Cup qualification	Bangladesh	0–4	Uzbekistan	Dhaka, Bangladesh
15:00 (BST)		Report; Report	Zeytulaev 11'; Bakaev 18'; Djeparov 22'; Shatskikh 39' (pen.)	Stadium: Bangladesh Army Stadium; Attendance: 120; Referee: Tan Hai (China PR)

15 November 2006 2007 Asian Cup qualification	Hong Kong	2–0	Bangladesh	Kowloon, Hong Kong
20:00 CST	Ambassa Guy 43', 74' (pen.)	Report; Report		Stadium: Mong Kok Stadium; Attendance: 1,273; Referee: Kim Dong-Jin (Korea Republic)

=== 2007 ===
18 August 2007 2007 Nehru Cup	Bangladesh	0–2	Syria	New Delhi, India
19:00 IST		Report	Al Sayed 48'; Chaabo 79'	Stadium: Ambedkar Stadium; Referee: A. Arjunan (India)

20 August 2007 2007 Nehru Cup	India	1–0	Bangladesh	New Delhi, India
19:00 IST	Bhutia 5'	Report		Stadium: Ambedkar Stadium; Referee: Sikhrakar Surendra (Nepal)

22 August 2007 2007 Nehru Cup	Bangladesh	1–1	Cambodia	New Delhi, India
19:00 IST	Abul 30'	Report	Kasal 90'	Stadium: Ambedkar Stadium; Referee: A. Arjunan (India)

24 August 2007 2007 Nehru Cup	Bangladesh	0–3	Kyrgyzstan	New Delhi, India
19:00 IST		Report	Lutfullaev 28', 54'; Djamshidov 57'	Stadium: Ambedkar Stadium; Referee: Srinivasan Suresh (India)

8 October 2007 2010 World Cup qualification	Bangladesh	1–1	Tajikistan	Dhaka, Bangladesh
15:00 UTC+6	Mithu 50'	Report; Report	Khakimov 58' (pen.)	Stadium: 700; Attendance: Bangabandhu National Stadium; Referee: Abdullah Al Hilali (Oman)

28 October 2007 2010 World Cup qualification	Tajikistan	5–0	Bangladesh	Dushanbe, Tajikistan
14:00 UTC+5	Khakimov 47', 48', 76' (pen.); Mukhiddinov 51'; Vasiev 71'	Report; Report		Stadium: Central Stadium; Attendance: 10,000; Referee: Kadyrbek Chynybekov (Kyrgyzstan)

=== 2008 ===
5 May 2008 2008 AFC Challenge Cup qualification	Bangladesh	0–0	Afghanistan	Bishkek, Kyrgyzstan
17:30 UTC+6		Report; Report; Report		Stadium: Spartak Stadium; Attendance: 3,000; Referee: Khalid Al-Senan (United Arab Emirates)

9 May 2008 2008 AFC Challenge Cup qualification	Kyrgyzstan	2–1	Bangladesh	Bishkek, Kyrgyzstan
17:30 UTC+6	Kornilov 83'; Sydykov 87'	Report; Report	Ameli 63'	Stadium: Spartak Stadium; Attendance: 5,000; Referee: Atallah Jatli Al-Enezi (Kuwait)

4 June 2008 2008 SAFF Championship G.S	Bangladesh	1–1	Bhutan	Colombo, Sri Lanka
16:30 (SLST)	Baidya 27'	Report; Report	Sangay 79'	Stadium: Sugathadasa Stadium

6 June 2008 2008 SAFF Championship G.S	Bangladesh	2–2	Afghanistan	Colombo, Sri Lanka
19:00 (SLST)	Ameli 51' (pen.); Mamunul 75'	Report; Report; Report	H. A. Habib 9'; Hadid 22'	Stadium: Sugathadasa Stadium

8 June 2008 2008 SAFF Championship G.S	Sri Lanka	1–0	Bangladesh	Colombo, Sri Lanka
16:30 (SLST)	Mohideen 71'	Report; Report		Stadium: Sugathadasa Stadium

18 October 2008 2008 Merdeka Tournament	Myanmar	1–0	Bangladesh	Shah Alam, Malaysia
20:45 (UTC+8)	Soe Myat Min 23'	Report; Report		Stadium: Shah Alam Stadium

11 November 2008 2008 Myanmar Challenge Cup	Myanmar	0–0	Bangladesh	Yangon, Myanmar
		Report; Report		Stadium: Thuwunna Stadium; Attendance: 15,000

13 November 2008 2008 Myanmar Challenge Cup	Indonesia	2–0	Bangladesh	Yangon, Myanmar
15:00 (MMT)	Firman 10'; Talaohu 45'	Report		Stadium: Thuwunna Stadium

=== 2009 ===
26 April 2009 2010 AFC Challenge Cup qualification	Cambodia	0–1	Bangladesh	Dhaka, Bangladesh
15:30 (BST)		Report; Report; Report	Enamul 73'	Stadium: Bangabandhu National Stadium; Attendance: 8,060; Referee: Saeid Mozaffarizadeh (Iran)

28 April 2009 2010 AFC Challenge Cup qualification	Bangladesh	1–2	Myanmar	Dhaka, Bangladesh
18:00 (BST)	Enamul 12'	Report; Report; Report	Pai Soe 68', 77'	Stadium: Bangabandhu National Stadium; Attendance: 14,000; Referee: Hajime Matsuo (Japan)

30 April 2009 2010 AFC Challenge Cup qualification	Bangladesh	3–0	Macau	Dhaka, Bangladesh
18:00 (BST)	Mamunul 38'; Zahid 68', 71'	Report; Report; Report		Stadium: Bangabandhu National Stadium; Attendance: 8,700; Referee: Dmitriy Mashentsev (Kyrgyzstan)

4 December 2009 2009 SAFF Championship G.S	Bangladesh	4–1	Bhutan	Dhaka, Bangladesh
18:00 (BST)	Pranotosh 11'; Enamul 22', 51'; Ameli 72'	Report; Report	Dendup 42' (pen.)	Stadium: Bangabandhu National Stadium; Attendance: 20,000

6 December 2009 2009 SAFF Championship G.S	Bangladesh	0–0	Pakistan	Dhaka, Bangladesh
18:00 (BST)		Report; Report		Stadium: Bangabandhu National Stadium; Referee: Al Hosni Ibrahim (Oman)

8 December 2009 2009 SAFF Championship G.S	Bangladesh	2–1	Sri Lanka	Dhaka, Bangladesh
18:00 (BST)	Enamul 8', 64'	Report; Report	Channa 42'	Stadium: Bangabandhu National Stadium; Referee: Adil Ali (Maldives)

=== 2010 ===
16 February 2010 2010 AFC Challenge Cup G.S	Tajikistan	1–2	Bangladesh	Colombo, Sri Lanka
16:00 (SLT)	Rabiev 70'	Report; Report; Report	Enamul 67'; Meshu 74'	Stadium: Sugathadasa Stadium; Attendance: 1,000; Referee: Hajime Matsuo (Japan)

18 February 2010 2010 AFC Challenge Cup G.S	Bangladesh	1–2	Myanmar	Colombo, Sri Lanka
	Zahid 49'	Report; Report	Tun Tun Win 16'; Pai Soe 32'	Stadium: Sugathadasa Stadium; Attendance: 500; Referee: Mukhtar Al Yarimi (Yemen)

20 February 2010 2010 AFC Challenge Cup G.S	Sri Lanka	3–0	Bangladesh	Colombo, Sri Lanka
	Kaiz 7'; Gunarathna 43'; Sanjeev 79'	Report; Report		Stadium: Sugathadasa Stadium; Attendance: 600; Referee: Chaiya Mahapab (Thailand)

=== 2011 ===
21 March 2011 2012 AFC Challenge Cup qualification	Palestine	2–0	Bangladesh	Yangon, Myanmar
18:00 UTC+6:30	Alyan 46', 65'	Report		Stadium: Youth Training Centre; Attendance: 1,000; Referee: Jameel Abdulhusain Mohamed (Bahrain)

23 March 2011 2012 AFC Challenge Cup qualification	Bangladesh	2–0	Myanmar	Yangon, Myanmar
18:00 UTC+6:30	Shakil 10'; Komol 88'	Report		Stadium: Youth Training Centre; Attendance: 3,000; Referee: Apisit Aonrak (Thailand)

25 March 2011 2012 AFC Challenge Cup qualification	Bangladesh	0–3	Philippines	Yangon, Myanmar
15:30 UTC+6:30		Report	Araneta 41'; Guirado 55', 80'	Stadium: Bogyoke Aung San Stadium; Attendance: 200; Referee: Kim Jong-Hyeok (Korea Republic)

29 June 2011 2014 World Cup qualification	Bangladesh	3–0	Pakistan	Dhaka, Bangladesh
18:00 UTC+6	Ameli 1'; Zahid 22'; Reza 56'	Report		Stadium: Bangabandhu National Stadium; Attendance: 5,326; Referee: Mohammad Abu Loum (Jordan)

3 July 2011 2014 World Cup qualification	Pakistan	0–0	Bangladesh	Lahore, Pakistan
20:30 UTC+5		Report		Stadium: Punjab Stadium; Attendance: 3,500; Referee: Ali Abdulnabi (Bahrain)

23 July 2011 2014 World Cup qualification	Lebanon	4–0	Bangladesh	Beirut, Lebanon
17:00 UTC+3	Maatouk 16'; El Ali 27'; Al Saadi 55'; Al Ali 64'	Report		Stadium: Camille Chamoun Sports City Stadium; Attendance: 2,000; Referee: Kadhum Auda (Iraq)

28 July 2011 2014 World Cup qualification	Bangladesh	2–0	Lebanon	Dhaka, Bangladesh
18:00 UTC+6	Mithun 52'; Ameli 87'	Report		Stadium: Bangabandhu National Stadium; Attendance: 11,000; Referee: Apisit Aonrak (Thailand)

2 December 2011 2011 SAFF Championship G.S	Bangladesh	0–0	Pakistan	New Delhi, India
15:00 UTC+5:30		Report		Stadium: Jawaharlal Nehru Stadium; Referee: Timur Faizullin (Kyrgyzstan)

4 December 2011 2011 SAFF Championship G.S	Nepal	1–0	Bangladesh	New Delhi, India
15:00 UTC+5:30	Thapa 90+5'	Report		Stadium: Jawaharlal Nehru Stadium; Attendance: Santosh Kumar (India)

6 December 2011 2011 SAFF Championship G.S	Maldives	3–1	Bangladesh	New Delhi, India
18:00 UTC+5:30	Thariq 6', 17'; Ashfaq 70'		Shahed 29'	Stadium: Jawaharlal Nehru Stadium; Referee: Masoud Tufayelieh (Syria)

=== 2012 ===
20 September 2012 Friendly	Nepal	1–1	Bangladesh	Kathmandu, Nepal
	Silwal 61'	Report	Zahid 43'	Stadium: Dasarath Stadium; Attendance: 5,000

17 November 2012 Friendly	Thailand	5–0	Bangladesh	Bangkok, Thailand
19:00 UTC+7:00	Pichitphong 5'; Teerasil 12', 20', 52'; Napat 74'	Report		Stadium: Rajamangala Stadium

20 November 2012 Friendly	Malaysia	1–1	Bangladesh	Kuala Lumpur, Malaysia
20:45 (UTC+8)	Khyril 22'	Report	Ameli 83' (pen.)	Stadium: Bukit Jalil National Stadium

=== 2013 ===
2 March 2013 2014 AFC Challenge Cup qualification	Palestine	1–0	Bangladesh	Kathmandu, Nepal
14:00 UTC+5:45	Dheeb 78'	Report		Stadium: Dasharath Rangasala; Attendance: 4,000; Referee: Mohd Amirul Izwan Bin Yaacob (Malaysia)

4 March 2013 2014 AFC Challenge Cup qualification	Bangladesh	2–0	Nepal	Kathmandu, Nepal
17:05 UTC+5:45	Rony 28' (pen.), 57'	Report		Stadium: Dasarath Stadium; Attendance: 19,000; Referee: Fahad Al-Marri (Qatar)

6 March 2013 2014 AFC Challenge Cup qualification	Bangladesh	4–0	Northern Mariana Islands	Kathmandu, Nepal
	Toklis 2', 83'; Rony 37'; Linkon 90'	Report		Stadium: Dasarath Stadium; Attendance: 2,000; Referee: Mohd Amirul Izwan Bin Yaacob (Malaysia)

31 August 2013 2013 SAFF Championship G.S	Nepal	2–0	Bangladesh	Kathmandu, Nepal
18:30 UTC+05:45	Gurung 18'; Khawas 31'	Report		Stadium: Dasarath Stadium; Referee: Adham Makhadmeh (Jordan)

3 September 2013 2013 SAFF Championship G.S	Bangladesh	1–1	India	Kathmandu, Nepal
15:30 UTC+05:45	Meshu 82'	Report	Chhetri 90+5'	Stadium: Halchowk Stadium; Referee: Hettikamkanamge Perera (Sri Lanka)

5 September 2013 2013 SAFF Championship G.S	Bangladesh	1–2	Pakistan	Kathmandu, Nepal
15:30 UTC+05:45	Ameli 30'	Report	Ishaq 36'; Kalim 90+2'	Stadium: Halchowk Stadium; Referee: Saleh Al Hethlol (Saudi Arabia)

=== 2014 ===
5 March 2014 Friendly	India	2–2	Bangladesh	Goa, India
18:00 BST	Chhetri 14', 90+2'	Report	Mithun 51'; Mondal 64' (o.g.)	Stadium: Fatorda Stadium

24 October 2014 Friendly	Bangladesh	1–1	Sri Lanka	Jessore, Bangladesh
	Ameli 15'	Report	Roshan 28'	Stadium: Shamsul Huda Stadium; Attendance: 30,000

27 October 2014 Friendly	Bangladesh	1–0	Sri Lanka	Rajshahi, Bangladesh
15:00 BST	Ameli 3' (pen.)	Report		Stadium: Muktijuddho Sriti Stadium; Attendance: 30,000; Referee: Mizanur Rahman (Bangladesh)

=== 2015 ===
2 February 2015 2015 Bangabandhu Cup	Bangladesh	1–0	Sri Lanka	Dhaka, Bangladesh
	Hemanta 41'	Report		Stadium: Bangabandhu National Stadium; Attendance: 18,000; Referee: Khamis Al-Marri (Qatar)

30 May 2015 Friendly	Bangladesh	1–2	Singapore	Dhaka, Bangladesh
16:00 BST	Nasiruddin 4'	Report	Fazrul 32'; Amri 72'	Stadium: Bangabandhu National Stadium

2 June 2015 Friendly	Bangladesh	1–1	Afghanistan	Dhaka, Bangladesh
	Ameli 4'	Report	Shanwary 90+2'	Stadium: Bangabandhu National Stadium

11 June 2015 2018 World Cup qualification	Bangladesh	1–3	Kyrgyzstan	Dhaka, Bangladesh
17:00 UTC+6	Kichin 32' (o.g.)	Report	Zemlianukhin 9', 41'; Bernhardt 29' (pen.)	Stadium: Bangabandhu National Stadium; Attendance: 10,000; Referee: Sukhbir Singh (Singapore)

16 June 2015 2018 World Cup qualification	Bangladesh	1–1	Tajikistan	Dhaka, Bangladesh
17:00 UTC+6	Ameli 50'	Report	Fatkhuloev 88'	Stadium: Bangabandhu National Stadium; Attendance: 12,000; Referee: Lee Min-hu (South Korea)

29 August 2015 Friendly	Malaysia	0–0	Bangladesh	Selangor, Malaysia
		Report		Stadium: Shah Alam Stadium

3 September 2015 2018 World Cup qualification	Australia	5–0	Bangladesh	Perth, Australia
19:00 UTC+8	Leckie 6'; Rogic 8', 20'; Burns 29'; Mooy 61'	Report		Stadium: Perth Oval; Attendance: 19,495; Referee: Võ Minh Trí (Vietnam)

8 September 2015 2018 World Cup qualification	Bangladesh	0–4	Jordan	Dhaka, Bangladesh
17:00 UTC+6		Report	Deeb 13' (pen.), 56'; Abu Amarah 33'; Al-Bakhit 58'	Stadium: Bangabandhu National Stadium; Attendance: 12,000; Referee: Yu Ming-hsun (Chinese Taipei)

13 October 2015 2018 World Cup qualification	Kyrgyzstan	2–0	Bangladesh	Bishkek, Kyrgyzstan
20:00 UTC+6	Lux 27'; Amirov 89'	Report		Stadium: Spartak Stadium; Attendance: 12,001; Referee: Jameel Abdulhusin (Bahrain)

12 November 2015 2018 World Cup qualification	Tajikistan	5–0	Bangladesh	Dushanbe, Tajikistan
17:00 UTC+5	M. Dzhalilov 16', 26', 59', 74'; Nazarov 51' (pen.)	Report		Stadium: Pamir Stadium; Attendance: 5,500; Referee: Ali Sabah Adday Al-Qaysi (Iraq)

17 November 2015 2018 World Cup qualification	Bangladesh	0–4	Australia	Dhaka, Bangladesh
17:30 UTC+6		Report	Cahill 6', 32', 37'; Jedinak 43'	Stadium: Bangabandhu National Stadium; Attendance: 19,730; Referee: Wang Di (China)

17 December 2015 Friendly	Bangladesh	1–0	Nepal	Dhaka, Bangladesh
	Rony 18'	Report		Stadium: Bangabandhu National Stadium

24 December 2015 2015 SAFF Championship G.S	Afghanistan	4–0	Bangladesh	Thiruvananthapuram, India
18:30 UTC+5:30	Saighani 30'; Shayesteh 32'; Amiri 40'; Amani 69'	Report		Stadium: Trivandrum International Stadium; Attendance: 150; Referee: Pranjal Banerjee (India)

26 December 2015 2015 SAFF Championship G.S	Bangladesh	1–3	Maldives	Thiruvananthapuram, India
15:30 UTC+5:30	Hemanta 86'	Report	Ashfaq 42' (pen.); Hassan 90'; Nashid 90+5'	Stadium: Trivandrum International Stadium; Attendance: 3,654; Referee: Võ Minh Trí (Vietnam)

28 December 2015 2015 SAFF Championship G.S	Bhutan	0–3	Bangladesh	Thiruvananthapuram, India
15:30 UTC+5:30		Report	Barman 8'; Rony 24' (pen.), 67'	Stadium: Trivandrum International Stadium; Attendance: 218; Referee: Pranjal Banerjee (India)

=== 2016 ===
8 January 2016 2016 Bangabandhu Cup	Bangladesh	4–2	Sri Lanka	Jessore, Bangladesh
14:45 BST	Rony 17', 86'; Zahid 22'; Jibon 42'	Report	Figurado 21' (pen.); Chaturanga 52'	Stadium: Shamsul Huda Stadium; Attendance: 12,000; Referee: Sivakorn Pu-Udom (Thailand)

15 January 2016 2016 Bangabandhu Cup	Bangladesh	0–0	Nepal	Dhaka, Bangladesh
18:30 BST		Report		Stadium: Bangabandhu National Stadium; Attendance: 8,000; Referee: Sivakorn Pu-Udom (Thailand)

18 March 2016 Friendly	United Arab Emirates	6–1	Bangladesh	Abu Dhabi, United Arab Emirates
19:00 UTC+4	Al Hammadi 2', 69'; Khalil 49'; Saleh 82', 87'; Al Abri 90' (pen.)	Report	Jibon 5'	Stadium: Zayed Sports City Stadium; Referee: Al Majarafi Said (Oman)

24 March 2016 2018 World Cup qualification	Jordan	8–0	Bangladesh	Amman, Jordan
14:30 UTC+2	Al-Dardour 7', 23', 40'; Deeb 29' (pen.); Al-Rawashdeh 32'; Faisal 63'; Al-Naber 82'; Samir 90+2' (pen.)	Report		Stadium: Amman International Stadium; Attendance: 6,000; Referee: Muhammad Taqi Aljaafari Bin Jahari (Singapore)

2 June 2016 2019 AFC Asian Cup qualification	Tajikistan	5–0	Bangladesh	Dushanbe, Tajikistan
20:00 UTC+5	Jahongir 19', 30'; Umarbayev 33'; Davron 49'; Sharipov 72'	Report		Stadium: Pamir Stadium; Attendance: 8,332; Referee: Hanna Hattab (Syria)

7 June 2016 2019 AFC Asian Cup qualification	Bangladesh	0–1	Tajikistan	Dhaka, Bangladesh
16:30 UTC+6		Report	Nazarov 8'	Stadium: Bangabandhu National Stadium; Attendance: 800; Referee: Hussein Abo Yehia (Lebanon)

1 September 2016 Friendly	Maldives	5–0	Bangladesh	Malé, Maldives
	Abdulla 53', 61', 82'; Hamza 79'; Ismail 90+1'	Report		Stadium: Galolhu Rasmee Dhandu Stadium

6 September 2016 2019 AFC Asian Cup qualification	Bangladesh	0–0	Bhutan	Dhaka, Bangladesh
19:00 UTC+6		Report		Stadium: Bangabandhu National Stadium; Attendance: 5,000; Referee: Çarymyrat Kurbanow (Turkmenistan)

10 October 2016 2019 AFC Asian Cup qualification	Bhutan	3–1	Bangladesh	Thimphu, Bhutan
18:00 UTC+6	Dorji 4'; Chencho 26', 76'	Report	Mamunul 63'	Stadium: Changlimithang Stadium; Attendance: 6,120; Referee: Khurram Shahzad (Pakistan)

=== 2018 ===
27 March 2018 Friendly	Laos	2–2	Bangladesh	Vientiane, Laos
	Phithack 30', 46' (pen.)	Report	Jafar 81'; Sufil 90+2'	Stadium: New Laos National Stadium

29 August 2018 Friendly	Bangladesh	0–1	Sri Lanka	Nilphamari, Bangladesh
16:00 BST		Report	Fasa 10'	Stadium: Nilphamari International Stadium; Attendance: 21,359

4 September 2018 2018 SAFF Championship G.S	Bangladesh	2–0	Bhutan	Dhaka, Bangladesh
19:00 BST	Barman 3' (pen.); Sufil 47'			Stadium: Bangabandhu National Stadium; Attendance: 10,000; Referee: Sivakorn Pu-udom (Thailand)

6 September 2018 2018 SAFF Championship G.S	Bangladesh	1–0	Pakistan	Dhaka, Bangladesh
19:00 BST	Barman 85'	Report		Stadium: Bangabandhu National Stadium; Attendance: 20,000; Referee: Hasan Akrami (Iran)

8 September 2018 2018 SAFF Championship G.S	Bangladesh	0–2	Nepal	Dhaka, Bangladesh
19:00 BST		Report	Bimal 33'; Shrestha 90'	Stadium: Bangabandhu National Stadium; Referee: Hettikamkanamge Perera (Sri Lanka)

1 October 2018 2018 Bangabandhu Cup	Bangladesh	1–0	Laos	Sylhet, Bangladesh
18:30 BST	Biplu 60'	Report		Stadium: Sylhet District Stadium; Referee: Mahmood Al-Majarafi (Oman)

5 October 2018 2018 Bangabandhu Cup	Bangladesh	0–1	Philippines	Sylhet, Bangladesh
18:30 BST		Report	Daniels 24'	Stadium: Sylhet District Stadium; Referee: Zaid Thamer Mohammed (Iraq)

10 October 2018 2018 Bangabandhu Cup	Palestine	2–0	Bangladesh	Cox's Bazar, Bangladesh
14:30 BST	Balah 8'; Maraaba 90+4'	Report		Stadium: Cox's Bazar Stadium; Attendance: 10,000; Referee: Zaid Thamer Mohammed (Iraq)

=== 2019 ===
9 March 2019 Friendly	Cambodia	0–1	Bangladesh	Phnom Penh, Cambodia
17:30 UTC+7		Report	Rabiul 83'	Stadium: Olympic Stadium

6 June 2019 2022 World Cup qualification	Laos	0–1	Bangladesh	Vientiane, Laos
18:30 UTC+7		Report	Rabiul 72'	Stadium: New Laos National Stadium; Attendance: 4,572; Referee: Ho Wai Sing (Hong Kong)

11 June 2019 2022 World Cup qualification	Bangladesh	0–0	Laos	Dhaka, Bangladesh
19:00 UTC+6		Report		Stadium: Bangabandhu National Stadium; Attendance: 7,453; Referee: Timur Faizullin (Kyrgyzstan)

10 September 2019 2022 World Cup qualification	Afghanistan	1–0	Bangladesh	Dushanbe, Tajikistan
19:00 UTC+5	Noor 27'	Report		Stadium: Central Republican Stadium (Note: Afghanistan played their home matches in Tajikistan because of security concerns from the War in Afghanistan.); Attendance: 5,000; Referee: Zhang Lei (China)

29 September 2019 Friendly	Bangladesh	4–1	Bhutan	Dhaka, Bangladesh
19:00 BST	Jibon 12', 38'; Biplu 74'; Rabiul 81'	Report	Dorji 51'	Stadium: Bangabandhu National Stadium

3 October 2019 Friendly	Bangladesh	2–0	Bhutan	Dhaka, Bangladesh
19:00 BST	Yeasin 22', 66'	Report		Stadium: Bangabandhu National Stadium; Attendance: 5,000

10 October 2019 2022 World Cup qualification	Bangladesh	0–2	Qatar	Dhaka, Bangladesh
19:00 UTC+6		Report	Abdurisag 28'; Boudiaf 90+2'	Stadium: Bangabandhu National Stadium; Attendance: 24,570; Referee: Bijan Heidari (Iran)

15 October 2019 2022 World Cup qualification	India	1–1	Bangladesh	Kolkata, India
19:30 UTC+5:30	Khan 88'	Report	Saad 42'	Stadium: Salt Lake Stadium; Attendance: 53,286; Referee: Masoud Tufayelieh (Syria)

14 November 2019 2022 World Cup qualification	Oman	4–1	Bangladesh	Muscat, Oman
19:00 UTC+4	Al-Khaldi 48'; R. Al-Alawi 68'; A. Al-Alawi 78'; Al-Hidi 90+1'	Report	Biplu 81'	Stadium: Sultan Qaboos Sports Complex; Attendance: 24,000; Referee: Hanna Hattab (Syria)

== Head to head record ==
Bangladesh national football team head-to-head records (2000–2019)
Opponent	Pld	W	D	L	GF	GA	GD	Pts	Confederation
Afghanistan	5	0	3	2	3	8	–5	3	AFC
Australia	2	0	0	2	0	9	–9	0	AFC
Bhutan	11	8	2	1	26	7	+19	26	AFC
Bosnia and Herzegovina	1	0	0	1	0	2	–2	0	UEFA
Cambodia	4	3	1	0	5	2	+3	10	AFC
Guam	1	1	0	0	3	0	+3	3	AFC
Hong Kong	3	0	1	2	2	5	–3	1	AFC
India	9	1	5	3	8	11	–3	8	AFC
Indonesia	1	0	0	1	0	2	–2	0	AFC
Jordan	2	0	0	2	0	12	–12	0	AFC
Kyrgyzstan	4	0	0	4	2	10	–8	0	AFC
Laos	5	2	2	1	5	4	+1	8	AFC
Lebanon	2	1	0	1	2	4	–2	3	AFC
Macau	1	1	0	0	3	0	+3	3	AFC
Malaysia	2	0	2	0	1	1	0	2	AFC
Maldives	6	1	2	3	5	13	–8	5	AFC
Mongolia	2	1	1	0	5	2	+3	4	AFC
Myanmar	5	1	1	3	4	5	–1	4	AFC
Nepal	9	4	2	3	7	6	+1	14	AFC
Oman	1	0	0	1	1	4	–3	0	AFC
Pakistan	9	4	4	1	7	2	+5	16	AFC
Palestine	4	0	1	3	1	6	–5	1	AFC
Philippines	2	0	0	2	0	4	–4	0	AFC
Qatar	3	0	0	3	1	9	–8	0	AFC
Saudi Arabia	2	0	0	2	0	9	–9	0	AFC
Singapore	1	0	0	1	1	2	–1	0	AFC
Sri Lanka	9	4	1	4	9	10	–1	13	AFC
Syria	1	0	0	1	0	2	–2	0	AFC
Tajikistan	10	1	2	7	5	30	–25	5	AFC
Thailand	1	0	0	1	0	5	–5	0	AFC
United Arab Emirates	1	0	0	1	1	6	–5	0	AFC
Uzbekistan	2	0	0	2	0	9	–9	0	AFC
Vietnam	2	0	1	1	0	4	–4	1	AFC
Total	123	33	31	59	117	217	–100	130	
