= Cambodia national football team results (2010–2019) =

This article provides details of international football games played by the Cambodia national football team from the 2010 to 2019.

== Results ==
=== 2010 ===
23 January 2010 Hybrid Friendly	Cambodia	0–1	(South Korea) Ulsan University	Phnom Penh, Cambodia
		Report		Stadium: Olympic Stadium

18 September 2010 Hybrid Friendly	Vietnam U-23	2-0	Cambodia	Ho Chi Minh, Vietnam
		Report

21 September 2010 Hybrid Friendly	Vietnam U-23	3-0	Cambodia	Ho Chi Minh, Vietnam
		Report

17 October 2010 Hybrid friendly	Cambodia	0-0	Preah Khan Reach	Phnom Penh, Cambodia
		Report		Stadium: Phnom Penh National Olympic Stadium

18 October 2010 Hybrid friendly	Cambodia	1-1	Police Commissary	Phnom Penh, Cambodia
		Report		Stadium: Phnom Penh National Olympic Stadium

22 October 2010 2010 AFF Championship qualification	Laos	0–0	Cambodia	Vientiane, Laos
18:30 UTC+7		Report		Stadium: National Sports Complex; Referee: Mohd Nafeez Abdul Wahab (Malaysia)

24 October 2010 2010 AFF Championship qualification	Cambodia	4–2	Timor-Leste	Vientiane, Laos
16:00 UTC+7	Borey 26', 29', 40'; Sinoun 75'	Report	Quito 5'; Anggisun 85'	Stadium: National Sports Complex; Referee: Phùng Dìng Hưng (Vietnam)

26 October 2010 2010 AFF Championship qualification	Philippines	0–0	Cambodia	Vientiane, Laos
16:00 UTC+7		Report		Stadium: National Sports Complex; Referee: Mohd Nafeez Abdul Wahab (Malaysia)

24 November 2010 Hybrid friendly	Cambodia	2-0	Police Commissary	Phnom Penh, Cambodia
		Report		Stadium: Phnom Penh National Olympic Stadium

27 November 2010 Hybrid friendly	Cambodia	2-0	Kirivong Sok Sen Chey	Phnom Penh, Cambodia
		Report		Stadium: Phnom Penh National Olympic Stadium

30 November 2010 Hybrid friendly	Cambodia	1-1	Defense Ministry	Phnom Penh, Cambodia
		Report		Stadium: Phnom Penh National Olympic Stadium

5 December 2010 Hybrid Friendly	Cambodia	1-4	(South Korea) Ulsan University	Phnom Penh, Cambodia
		Report		Stadium: Olympic Stadium

17 December 2010 Hybrid friendly	Cambodia	1-1	Phnom Penh Crown	Phnom Penh, Cambodia
		Report		Stadium: Phnom Penh National Olympic Stadium

=== 2011 ===
9 February 2011 2012 AFC Challenge Cup playoff round	Cambodia	3–1	Macau	Phnom Penh, Cambodia
15:30 UTC+7	El Nasa 48', 53'; Laboravy 59'	Report	Leong Ka Hang 80'	Stadium: Phnom Penh National Olympic Stadium; Attendance: 2,000; Referee: Win Cho (Myanmar)

16 February 2011 2012 Challenge Cup playoff round	Macau	3–2 (a.e.t.) (4–5 agg.)	Cambodia	Macau
19:00 UTC+8	Vernon 62'; Leong Ka Hang 73'; Vinício 75'	Report	Borey 45+2'; El Nasa 107'	Stadium: Macau Olympic Complex; Attendance: 100; Referee: Hettikamkanamge Perera (Sri Lanka)

21 March 2011 2012 AFC Challenge Cup Group Stage	Maldives	4–0	Cambodia	Malé, Maldives
21:00 UTC+5	Naseer 2'; Ashfaq 41', 84', 88'	Report		Stadium: Rasmee Dhandu Stadium; Attendance: 8,000; Referee: Zhao Liang (China PR)

23 March 2011 2012 AFC Challenge Cup Group Stage	Cambodia	0–3	Tajikistan	Malé, Maldives
21:00 UTC+5		Report	Davronov 2'; Ergashev 83'; Rabimov 89'	Stadium: Rasmee Dhandu Stadium; Attendance: 550; Referee: Pratap Singh (India)

25 March 2011 2012 AFC Challenge Cup Group Stage	Cambodia	3–4	Kyrgyzstan	Malé, Maldives
21:00 UTC+5	Sokumpheak 39', 49'; Rithy 89'	Report	A. Sydykov 5'; Usanov 45+1'; Esenkul Uulu 80', 85'	Stadium: Rasmee Dhandu Stadium; Attendance: 1,000; Referee: Zhao Liang (China PR)

4 June 2011 Friendly	Peru	Postponed	Cambodia	Lima, Peru
4:00 UTC−5		Report

7 June 2011 Hybrid Friendly	Cambodia	1–0	Malaysia Olympic	National Olympic Stadium, Phnom Penh
16:00 UTC+7		Report

29 June 2011 2014 FIFA World Cup qualification – AFC first round	Cambodia	4–2	Laos	Phnom Penh, Cambodia
15:00 UTC+7	Laboravy 51'; Nasa 57', 88'; Sokumpheak 66'	(Report)	Phomsouvanh 9', 59'	Stadium: Phnom Penh National Olympic Stadium; Attendance: 19,240; Referee: Yadollah Jahanbazi (Iran)

3 July 2011 2014 FIFA World Cup qualification – AFC first round	Laos	6–2 (a.e.t.) (8-6 agg.)	Cambodia	Vientiane, Laos
18:00 UTC+7	Singto 19', 55'; Sayavutthi 34'; Syphasay 46'; Phaphouvanin 94'; Sysomvang 112' (pen.)	Report	Chhoeun 45'; Sokumpheak 75'	Stadium: New Laos National Stadium; Attendance: 10,000; Referee: Ryuji Sato (Japan)

28 October 2011 Hybrid Friendly	Cambodia	0-1	Nepal U-23	Phnom Penh, Cambodia
		Report		Stadium: Olympic Stadium

=== 2012 ===
14 January 2012 Hybrid Friendly	Cambodia	0-1	Malaysia U-23	Phnom Penh, Cambodia
		Report		Stadium: Olympic Stadium

27 January 2012 Hybrid Friendly	Cambodia	3-3	(South Korea) Ulsan University	Phnom Penh, Cambodia
		Report		Stadium: Olympic Stadium

29 January 2012 Hybrid Friendly	Cambodia	1-2	(South Korea) Ulsan University	Phnom Penh, Cambodia
		Report		Stadium: Olympic Stadium

21 August 2012 Hybrid friendly	Cambodia	1-2	Preah Khan Reach	Phnom Penh, Cambodia
		Report		Stadium: Phnom Penh National Olympic Stadium

5 September 2012 Friendly	Cambodia	0–0	Philippines	National Olympic Stadium, Phnom Penh
18:00 UTC+7		Report

20 September 2012 Unofficial Friendly	Malaysia	3–0	Cambodia	Kuala Lumpur, Malaysia
	Safee Sali 51'; Zaquan Adha 62' 76'	Report		Stadium: Wisma FAM

29 September 2012 Hybrid Friendly	Young Lions (Singapore)	3–3	Cambodia	Singapore
18:00 UTC+8		Report		Stadium: Jalan Besar Stadium

2 October 2012 Hybrid Friendly	Malaysia U-21	2–1	Cambodia	Kuala Lumpur, Malaysia
19:45 UTC+8	Mohd Fadhli Mohd Shas 54'; Thamil Arasu Ambumamee 69'	Report	Keo Sokngon 24'	Stadium: Wisma FAM

5 October 2012 2012 AFF Suzuki Cup qualification	Cambodia	1–5	Timor-Leste	Thuwunna Stadium, Yangon, Myanmar
15:00 UTC+6:30	Sokngon 90+1' (pen.)	Report	Murilo 39', 44'; Ade 56', 73'; Alan 87' (pen.)	Referee: Mukhtar Al Yarimi (Yemen)

7 October 2012 2012 AFF Suzuki Cup qualification	Laos	1–0	Cambodia	Thuwunna Stadium, Yangon, Myanmar
18:00 UTC+6:30	Phaphouvanin 40'	Report		Referee: Abdulla Al Zaabi (United Arab Emirates)

9 October 2012 2012 AFF Suzuki Cup qualification	Cambodia	2–3	Brunei	Thuwunna Stadium, Yangon, Myanmar
15:00 UTC+6:30	Mony Udom 24'; Borey 90+2'	Report	Aminuddin 56'; Helmi 63'; Azwan 70'	Referee: Hiroyoshi Takayama (Japan)

11 October 2012 2012 AFF Suzuki Cup qualification	Myanmar	3–0	Cambodia	Thuwunna Stadium, Yangon, Myanmar
18:00 UTC+6:30	Kyi Lin 59'; Kaung Sithu 65'; Pyae Phyo Aung 90+1'	Report		Referee: Mukhtar Al Yarimi (Yemen)

=== 2013 ===
4 January 2013 Hybrid Friendly	Cambodia	0–1	(South Korea) Ulsan University	Phnom Penh, Cambodia
		Report		Stadium: Olympic Stadium

6 January 2013 Hybrid Friendly	Cambodia	0–1	(South Korea) Ulsan University	Phnom Penh, Cambodia
		Report		Stadium: Olympic Stadium

6 March 2013 Hybrid Friendly	Cambodia	3–1	Malaysia U-23	Phnom Penh, Cambodia
		Report		Stadium: Olympic Stadium

15 March 2013 Hybrid friendly	Cambodia	2-1	Boeung Ket	Phnom Penh, Cambodia
		Report		Stadium: Phnom Penh National Olympic Stadium

22 March 2013 2014 AFC Challenge Cup qualification	Turkmenistan	7–0	Cambodia	Manila, Philippines
16:30 UTC+8	Amanow 7'; Baýramow 23', 36'; Thavrak 41' (o.g.); Şamyradow 74'; Abylow 81'; Batyrow 87'	Report		Stadium: Rizal Memorial Stadium, Manila; Attendance: 200; Referee: Chris Beath (Australia)

24 March 2013 2014 AFC Challenge Cup qualification	Cambodia	0–8	Philippines	Manila, Philippines
19:30 UTC+8		Report	P. Younghusband 26', 31', 34', 88'; Patiño 45', 58'; Schröck 46'; De Murga 90'	Stadium: Rizal Memorial Stadium; Attendance: 6,500; Referee: Nivon Robesh Gamini (Sri Lanka)

26 March 2013 2014 AFC Challenge Cup qualification	Cambodia	Cancelled	Brunei	Manila, Philippines
16:30 UTC+8				Stadium: Rizal Memorial Stadium, Manila

19 November 2013 Friendly	Cambodia	0–2	Guam	Phnom Penh, Cambodia
		Report	Ryan 18'; Cunliffe 68'	Stadium: Olympic Stadium

24 November 2013 Friendly	Singapore	1–0	Cambodia	Singapore
		Report		Stadium: Hougang Stadium

=== 2014 ===
4 August 2014 Hybrid friendly	Cambodia	2–1	Japanese footballers in Cambodia	Takéo Province, Cambodia
	Suong Virak 55'; Sok Chanrasmey 67'			Stadium: Tonle Bati National Training center

5 September 2014 Hybrid friendly	Cambodia	3–1	Svay Rieng	Takéo Province, Cambodia
				Stadium: Tonle Bati National Training center

13 September 2014 Hybrid friendly	Cambodia	2–2	Japan Football League XI	Phnom Penh, Cambodia
16:00 UTC+7	Chhin Chhoeun 52'; Sok Chanrasmey 60'		Tanaka Junya 73'; Suzuki Yuya 90'	Stadium: Phnom Penh National Olympic Stadium

20 September 2014 Friendly	Malaysia	4–1	Cambodia	Selangor, Malaysia
19:00 UTC+8	Kalang Tie 8', 65'; Daravorn 15' (o.g.); Baddrol 82'	Report	Chanrasmey 80'	Stadium: Shah Alam Stadium

25 September 2014 Friendly	Indonesia	1–0	Cambodia	Sidoarjo, Indonesia
15:30 UTC+7	Maitimo 45' (pen.)	Report		Stadium: Gelora Delta Stadium; Referee: Mohd Nafeez Abdul Wahab (Malaysia)

2 October 2014 Hybrid friendly	Cambodia	4–2	African footballers in Cambodia	Takéo Province, Cambodia
				Stadium: Tonle Bati National Training center

4 October 2014 Hybrid friendly	Cambodia	2–0	Svay Rieng	Takéo Province, Cambodia
				Stadium: Tonle Bati National Training center

8 October 2014 Friendly	Chinese Taipei	0–2	Cambodia	Taipei, Republic of China
19:00 UTC+8		Report	Vathanaka 89', 90+3'	Stadium: Taipei Municipal Stadium

12 October 2014 2014 AFF Suzuki Cup qualification	Laos	3–2	Cambodia	New Laos National Stadium, Vientiane, Laos
18:30 UTC+7	Sihavong 54'; Sayavutthi 70', 81'	Report	Laboravy 73'; Chanrasmey 75'	Referee: Adham Makhadmeh (Jordan)

16 October 2014 2014 AFF Suzuki Cup qualification	Timor-Leste	2–3	Cambodia	New Laos National Stadium, Vientiane, Laos
15:30 UTC+7	Anggisu 25'; Bertoldo 51'	Report	Chanrasmey 64', 78', 82'	Referee: Fu Ming (China)

18 October 2014 2014 AFF Suzuki Cup qualification	Cambodia	0–1	Myanmar	New Laos National Stadium, Vientiane, Laos
15:30 UTC+7		Report	Kyaw Ko Ko 42' (pen.)	Referee: Jumpei Iida (Japan)

20 October 2014 2014 AFF Suzuki Cup qualification	Cambodia	1–0	Brunei	Chao Anouvong Stadium, Vientiane, Laos
17:00 UTC+7	Chhoeun 56'	Report

14 November 2014 Friendly	Philippines	3–0	Cambodia	Manila, Philippines
20:05 UTC+8	Sato 13'; Ott 40'; P. Younghusband 90+3'	Report		Stadium: Rizal Memorial Stadium

17 November 2014 Friendly	Singapore	4–2	Cambodia	Yishun, Singapore
20:05 UTC+8	Khairul 9'; Faris 29'; Sharil 34'; Safuwan 37'	Report	Laboravy 27', 30'	Stadium: Yishun Stadium

=== 2015 ===
7 February 2015 Hybrid Friendly	Cambodia	2-5	(South Korea) Hwaseong FC	Svay Rieng, Cambodia
17:30 UTC+7		Report		Stadium: Svay Rieng Stadium

28 February 2015 Hybrid Friendly	Cambodia	3-0	Singapore U-22	Svay Rieng, Cambodia
		Report		Stadium: Svay Rieng Stadium

6 March 2015 Hybrid friendly	Phnom Penh Crown	1-2	Cambodia	Phnom Penh, Cambodia
		Report		Stadium: RSN Stadium

12 March 2015 2018 FIFA World Cup qualification – AFC first round	Cambodia	3–0	Macau	RCAF Old Stadium, Phnom Penh, Cambodia
	Chan Vathanaka 64',81', Khuon Laboravy 90'+4'			Attendance: 9000

17 March 2015 2018 FIFA World Cup qualification – AFC first round	Macau	1–1	Cambodia	Estádio Campo Desportivo, Taipa, Macau
			Theary Chanthabin 24'

17 May 2015 Hybrid friendly	Cambodia	4–1	MCL Japan All Star	Phnom Penh, Cambodia
18:30 UTC+7		Report		Stadium: Phnom Penh National Olympic Stadium; Attendance: 9000

22 May 2015 Hybrid Friendly	Cambodia	2-2	Cambodia U-23	Takéo Province, Cambodia
		Report		Stadium: Tonle Bati National Training center

28 May 2015 Hybrid friendly	Cambodia	2–2	African All Star	Phnom Penh, Cambodia
18:30 UTC+7	Borey (?); Julius (?)	Report	Dzarma (?); Laboravy (?)	Stadium: Phnom Penh National Olympic Stadium

2 June 2015 Friendly	Cambodia	1–1	Laos	Phnom Penh, Cambodia
18:30 UTC+7	Laboravy 46'	Report	Phimmasen 50'	Stadium: Phnom Penh National Olympic Stadium

5 June 2015 friendly	Cambodia	1–0	Myanmar	Samut Sakhon, Thailand
18:00 UTC+7	Borey (?)	Report		Stadium: Samut Sakhon Province Stadium

11 June 2015 2018 FIFA World Cup qualification – AFC second round	Cambodia	0–4	Singapore	Phnom Penh, Cambodia
18:30 UTC+7			Amri 9'; Baharudin 21', 35'; Nawaz 55'	Stadium: Phnom Penh Olympic Stadium; Attendance: 50,000; Referee: Kwok Man Liu (Hong Kong)

16 June 2015 2018 FIFA World Cup qualification – AFC second round	Cambodia	0–1	Afghanistan	Phnom Penh, Cambodia
18:30 UTC+7			Mustafa Zazai 86'	Stadium: Phnom Penh Olympic Stadium; Attendance: 40,000; Referee: Marai Alawaji (Saudi Arabia)

22 August 2015 Friendly	Cambodia	2–0	Bhutan	Phnom Penh, Cambodia
18:30 UTC+7	Samoeun 29'; Sokpheng 58'	Report		Stadium: Phnom Penh National Olympic Stadium; Referee: alongkron feemuechang (Thailand)

29 August 2015 Friendly	Laos	2–1	Cambodia	Vientiane, Laos
17:00 UTC+7	Khanthavong 11' 47'	Report	Bin 45'	Stadium: Laos National Stadium

3 September 2015 2018 FIFA World Cup qualification – AFC second round	Japan	3–0	Cambodia	Saitama, Japan
17:25 UTC+9	Honda 29'; Yoshida 50'; Kagawa 61'			Stadium: Saitama Stadium 2002; Referee: Kim Lee-Gon (South Korea)

8 September 2015 2018 FIFA World Cup qualification – AFC second round	Cambodia	0–6	Syria	Phnom Penh, Cambodia
18:30 UTC+7			Omar Khribin 29', 39'; Sanharib Malki 31'; Mahmoud Al Mawas 45'; Omar Al Midani 50'; Osama Omari 81'	Stadium: Phnom Penh Olympic Stadium; Attendance: 30,000; Referee: Wang Di (China)

8 October 2015 Hybrid friendly	Phnom Penh Crown	2-3	Cambodia	Phnom Penh, Cambodia
17:00 UTC+7		Report		Stadium: RSN Stadium

13 October 2015 2018 FIFA World Cup qualification – AFC second round	Singapore	2–1	Cambodia	Singapore, Singapore
19:00 UTC+8	Ramli 16'; Nawaz 47'		Sos Suhana 66'	Stadium: Singapore National Stadium; Referee: Kim Dae-Young (South Korea)

3 November 2015 Friendly	Cambodia	6–1	Brunei	Phnom Penh, Cambodia
18:30 UTC+7	Udom 20', 40'; Sokthorn 30'; Sokpheng 54', 62'; Visal 92'	Report	Rahman 12'	Stadium: Phnom Penh National Olympic Stadium

5 November 2015 Hybrid friendly	Cambodia	1–2	African All Star	Phnom Penh National Olympic Stadium, Phnom Penh, Cambodia
17:00 UTC+7	Borey (?)	Report	Dzarma (?); Privat (?)

12 November 2015 2018 FIFA World Cup qualification – AFC second round	Afghanistan	3–0	Cambodia	Tehran, Iran
18:30 UTC+4:30	Mustafa Zazai 42'; Norlla Amiri 78'; Khaibar Amani 90+4'			Stadium: Takhti Stadium; Referee: Adham Makhadmeh (Jordan)

17 November 2015 2018 FIFA World Cup qualification – AFC second round	Cambodia	0–2	Japan	Phnom Penh, Cambodia
18:30 UTC+7			Khuon Laboravy 51' (o.g.); Honda 90'	Stadium: Phnom Penh Olympic Stadium; Attendance: 50,000; Referee: Fu Ming (China)

=== 2016 ===
11 January 2016 2016 Bangabandhu Cup	Maldives	3-2	Cambodia	Jessore, Bangladesh
14:45 UTC+6	Ismail Easa 6'; Naaiz Hassan 38', 79'		Sun Vandeth 15'; Tith Dina 45+1'	Stadium: Shamsul Huda Stadium; Attendance: 10,000; Referee: Omar Al-Yacoubi (Oman)

14 January 2016 2016 Bangabandhu Cup	Bahrain U-21	1-0	Cambodia	Dhaka, Bangladesh
15:00 UTC+6	Abdul Aziz Al Shaikh 11'			Stadium: Bangabandhu National Stadium; Attendance: 800; Referee: Mohamed Jalal Uddin (Bangladesh)

16 January 2016 2016 Bangabandhu Cup	Cambodia	1-0	Bangladesh U-23	Dhaka, Bangladesh
18:30 UTC+6	Tith Dina 71'			Stadium: Bangabandhu National Stadium; Attendance: 3,000; Referee: Omar Al-Yacoubi (Oman)

16 January 2016 Hybrid Friendly	Cambodia All Stars	4-3	Muangthong United	Phnom Penh, Cambodia
18:30 UTC+7		Report		Stadium: Olympic Stadium

23 January 2016 Hybrid Friendly	Cambodia All Stars	2–2 (4-3 p)	Buriram United	Phnom Penh, Cambodia
18:30 UTC+7	MonyUdom 67'; Vathanaka 90'	Report	Suchao 45+2'; Diogo 80'	Stadium: Olympic Stadium

18 March 2016 Hybrid friendly	Cambodia All Stars	3-2	Lao All Stars	Phnom Penh, Cambodia
18:30 UTC+7		Report		Stadium: Phnom Penh National Olympic Stadium

24 March 2016 2018 FIFA World Cup qualification – AFC second round	Syria	6–0	Cambodia	Seeb, Oman
23:00 UTC+4	Omar Khribin 7', 19'; Ahmad Kalasi 57'; Makara 71' (o.g.); Abdelrazaq Ak Hussain 80'; Sanharib Malki 84'			Stadium: Al-Seeb Stadium; Referee: Chris Beath (Australia)

29 May 2016 Friendly	Cambodia	2–0	Timor-Leste	Phnom Penh, Cambodia
	Phuong Soksana 10'; Khoun Laboravy 48'			Stadium: National Olympic Stadium

2 June 2016 2019 ACQ play-off	Chinese Taipei	2–2	Cambodia	Taipei, Taiwan
20:00 UTC+8	Wei-Min Huang 6'; Po-Liang Chen 22'		Keo Sokpheng 8'; Chhin Chhoeun 32'	Stadium: Chinese Taipei National Stadium; Referee: Pranjal Banerjee (India)

7 June 2016 2019 ACQ play-off	Cambodia	2–0	Chinese Taipei	Phnom Penh, Cambodia
18:30 UTC+7	Hong Pheng 6'; Prak Mony Udom 60' (pen.)			Stadium: Phnom Penh Olympic Stadium; Attendance: 50,000; Referee: Ahmed Al-Ali (Jordan)

24 July 2016 Hybrid friendly	Phnom Penh Crown	3-2	Cambodia	Phnom Penh, Cambodia
		Report		Stadium: RSN Stadium

28 July 2016 Friendly	Cambodia	2–1	Singapore	Phnom Penh, Cambodia
18:30 UTC+7	Chan Vathanaka 19'; Tith Dina 44'		Khairul Amri 23'	Stadium: Phnom Penh Olympic Stadium; Attendance: 50,000

28 August 2016 Hybrid friendly	Cambodia	2-2	African All Star	Phnom Penh, Cambodia
17:00 UTC+7	Keo Sokpheng 29'; Chan Vathanaka 86'	Report		Stadium: Phnom Penh National Olympic Stadium

1 September 2016 Friendly	Hong Kong	4–2	Cambodia	Hong Kong Island, Hong Kong
19:00 UTC+8	Jaimes McKee 11'; Itaparica 31'; Sandro 42' (pen.); Lo Kwan Yee 86'		Polroth 20'; Chan Vathanaka 61'	Stadium: Mong Kok Stadium

23 September 2016 Hybrid Friendly	Albirex Niigata FC (Singapore)	1-2	Cambodia	Singapore, Singapore
		Report	Thierry Bin 36'; Hoy Phallin 47'	Stadium: National Stadium, Singapore

26 September 2016 Unofficial Friendly	Singapore	0-1	Cambodia	Singapore, Singapore
		Report	Cheng Meng 16'	Stadium: National Stadium, Singapore

29 September 2016 Hybrid Friendly	Geylang International FC (Singapore)	1-1	Cambodia	Singapore, Singapore
		Report	Sos Suhana 60'	Stadium: National Stadium, Singapore

6 October 2016 Friendly	Cambodia	0–2	Hong Kong	Phnom Penh, Cambodia
18:30 UTC+7			Karikari 7'; Akande 32'	Stadium: Phnom Penh Olympic Stadium; Attendance: 50,000

9 October 2016 Friendly	Cambodia	4–0	Sri Lanka	Phnom Penh, Cambodia
18:30 UTC+7	Soeuy Visal 2'; Thierry Chantha Bin 21'; Keo Sokpheng 69', 90'			Stadium: Phnom Penh Olympic Stadium; Attendance: 41,000

15 October 2016 2016 AFF Qualifiers	Cambodia	2–1	Laos	Phnom Penh, Cambodia
18:30 UTC+7	Prak Mony Udom 43' (pen.); Chhin Chhoeun 81'		Moukda Souksavath 52'	Stadium: Phnom Penh Olympic Stadium; Attendance: 60,000; Referee: Ahmad Ibrahim (Jordan)

18 October 2016 2016 AFF Qualifiers	Brunei	0–3	Cambodia	Phnom Penh, Cambodia
18:30 UTC+7			Prak Mony Udom 6', 43'; Keo Sokpheng 9'	Stadium: Phnom Penh Olympic Stadium; Attendance: 50,000; Referee: Lao Fong Hei (Hong Kong)

21 October 2016 2016 AFF Qualifiers	Cambodia	3–2	Timor-Leste	Phnom Penh, Cambodia
18:30 UTC+7	Tith Dina 1'; Chan Vathanaka 17', 77'		Anggisu Barbosa 20' (pen.); Nelson Sarmento Viegas 35'	Stadium: Phnom Penh Olympic Stadium; Attendance: 50,000; Referee: Sherzod Kasimov (Uzbekistan)

7 November 2016 Hybrid friendly	Cambodia	Cancelled	African All Star	Phnom Penh, Cambodia
		Report		Stadium: RSN Stadium

7 November 2016 Hybrid friendly	Phnom Penh Crown	1-3	Cambodia	Phnom Penh, Cambodia
17:00 UTC+7		Report		Stadium: RSN Stadium

12 November 2016 Hybrid friendly	Singapore-U22	0-2	Cambodia	Singapore, Singapore
		Report	Keo Sokpheng 82'; Chan Vathanaka 89'

13 November 2016 Friendly	Singapore	1-0	Cambodia	Singapore, Singapore
19:45 UTC+8	Yasir Hanapi 70'	Report		Stadium: Bishan Stadium

20 November 2016 2016 AFF Championship	Malaysia	3–2	Cambodia	Yangon, Myanmar
15:00 UTC+6:30	Syazwan 37'; Amri 69', 80'		Vathanaka 8', 60'	Stadium: Thuwunna Stadium; Attendance: 576; Referee: Yaqoob Abdul Baki (Oman)

23 November 2016 2016 AFF Championship	Cambodia	1–3	Myanmar	Yangon, Myanmar
18:00 UTC+6:30	Sos Suhana 14'		Zaw Min Tun 35', 40'; Aung Thu 57'	Stadium: Thuwunna Stadium; Attendance: 15,236; Referee: Kim Dong-jin (South Korea)

26 November 2016 2016 AFF Championship	Vietnam	2–1	Cambodia	Naypyidaw, Myanmar
18:00 UTC+6:30	Lê Công Vinh 20'; Nub Tola 50' (o.g.)		Polroth 65'	Stadium: Wunna Theikdi Stadium; Attendance: 685; Referee: Hiroyuki Kimura (Japan)

11 December 2016 Hybrid friendly	Cambodia	2-1	African All Star	Phnom Penh, Cambodia
		Report		Stadium: Phnom Penh National Olympic Stadium

14 December 2016 Hybrid friendly	Cambodia All Stars	2-1	Cambodia Tiger	Phnom Penh, Cambodia
		Report		Stadium: Phnom Penh National Olympic Stadium

18 December 2016 Hybrid friendly	Cambodia All Stars	1-1	Morocco; All Stars	Phnom Penh, Cambodia
17:30 UTC+7	Matthew 67'	Report	Saleh 6'	Stadium: RSN Stadium

=== 2017 ===
22 March 2017 Friendly	Cambodia	2–3	India	Phnom Penh, Cambodia
18:30 UTC+7	Khoun Laboravy 37'; Chan Vathanaka 62'		Sunil Chettri 35'; Jeje Lalpekhlua 49'; Sandesh Jhingan 53'	Stadium: Phnom Penh Olympic Stadium; Attendance: 40,000

28 March 2017 2019 ACQ Third Round	Jordan	7–0	Cambodia	Amman, Jordan
19:00 UTC+3	Hamza Al Dardour 12', 21', 87'; Yaseen Al Bakhit 47'; Odai Al Saify 61'; Ahmed Samir 63'; Mousan Al Tamari 90'			Stadium: King Abdullah International Stadium; Referee: Dmitry Mashentsev (Kyrgyzstan)

8 June 2017 Friendly	Cambodia	0–2	Indonesia	Phnom Penh, Cambodia
18:30 UTC+7			Irfan Bachdim 35'; Gian Zola 90+6'	Stadium: Phnom Penh Olympic Stadium; Attendance: 34,000; Referee: Warintorn Sassadee (Thailand)

13 June 2017 2019 ACQ Third Round	Cambodia	1–0	Afghanistan	Phnom Penh, Cambodia
18:30 UTC+7	Prak Mony Udom 60'			Stadium: Phnom Penh Olympic Stadium; Attendance: 50,000; Referee: Mouood Bonyadifar (Iran)

16 July 2017 Hybrid Friendly	Cambodia All Stars	0-4	Muangthong United	Phnom Penh, Cambodia
18:30 UTC+7		Report		Stadium: Olympic Stadium

5 September 2017 2019 ACQ Third Round	Cambodia	1–2	Vietnam	Phnom Penh, Cambodia
18:30 UTC+7	Chan Vathanaka 10'		Nguyen Van Quyet 4'; Nguyễn Quang Hải 81'	Stadium: Phnom Penh Olympic Stadium; Attendance: 40,000; Referee: Minoru Tojo (Japan)

4 October Unofficial friendly	Indonesia	3–1	Cambodia	Bekasi, Indonesia
21:00 UTC+7	Lerby 32'; Rezaldi 34'; Septian 49'	Report	Vathanaka 48'	Stadium: Patriot Candrabhaga Stadium; Referee: Sukbir Singh (Singapore)

10 October 2017 2019 ACQ Third Round	Vietnam	5–0	Cambodia	Hanoi, Vietnam
19:00 UTC+7	Dinh Thanh Trung 13'; Nguyen Van Quyet 56'; Nguyen Anh Duc 60'; Nguyen Cong Phuong 76'; Mac Hong Quan 90+2'			Stadium: Mỹ Đình National Stadium; Referee: Sivakorn Pu-udom (Thailand)

4 November 2017 Friendly	Cambodia	Cancelled	Fiji	Phnom Penh, Cambodia
18:30 UTC+7		Report		Stadium: Phnom Penh Olympic Stadium

5 November 2017 Hybrid friendly	Cambodia	1-2	African All Star	Phnom Penh, Cambodia
		Report		Stadium: Phnom Penh National Olympic Stadium

9 November 2017 Friendly	Cambodia	1–2	Myanmar	Phnom Penh, Cambodia
18:30 UTC+7	Prak Mony Udom 51'		Zaw Min Tun 15'; Aung Thu 71'	Stadium: Phnom Penh Olympic Stadium; Attendance: 40,000

14 November 2017 2019 ACQ Third Round	Cambodia	0–1	Jordan	Phnom Penh, Cambodia
18:30 UTC+7			Monther Abu Amara 17'	Stadium: Phnom Penh Olympic Stadium; Attendance: 35,000; Referee: Ilgiz Tantashev (Uzbekistan)

=== 2018 ===
22 March 2018 Friendly	Laos	0–1	Cambodia	Vientiane, Laos
19:00 UTC+7			Khoun Laboravy 86'	Stadium: New Laos National Stadium

27 March 2018 2019 ACQ Third Round	Afghanistan	2–1	Cambodia	Dushanbe, Tajikistan
15:30 UTC+5	Hamza Al Dardour 26', 45'		Khoun Laboravy 69'	Stadium: Respublikanskiy Stadion; Referee: Jumpei Iida (Japan)

10 September 2018 Friendly	Cambodia	1–3	Malaysia	Phnom Penh, Cambodia
18:30 UTC+7	Soeuy Visal 18'		Saad 62'; Syazwan Andik 74'; Fauzi 90+2'	Stadium: Phnom Penh Olympic Stadium; Attendance: 40,000

12 October 2018 Friendly	Cambodia	2–2	Timor-Leste	Phnom Penh, Cambodia
18:30 UTC+7	Chan Vathanaka 40'; Reung Bunheing 90+1'		Jose Almeida 30'; Rufino Gama 42'	Stadium: Phnom Penh Olympic Stadium; Attendance: 35,000

16 October 2018 Friendly	Cambodia	1–2	Singapore	Phnom Penh, Cambodia
18:30 UTC+7	Ho Wai Loon 17' (o.g.)		Jacob Mahler 61'; Ikhsan Fandi 75'	Stadium: Phnom Penh Olympic Stadium; Attendance: 35,000

8 November 2018 2018 AFF Championship	Cambodia	0–1	Malaysia	Phnom Penh, Cambodia
18:30 UTC+7			Norshahrul 31'	Stadium: Phnom Penh Olympic Stadium; Attendance: 34,250; Referee: Ahmad A'qashah (Singapore)

12 November 2018 2018 AFF Championship	Myanmar	4–1	Cambodia	Mandalay, Myanmar
18:00 UTC+6:30	Hlaing Bo Bo 60', 90+3'; Than Htet Aung 70'; Sithu Aung 87'		Chan Vathanaka 23'	Stadium: Mandalarthiri Stadium; Attendance: 26,946; Referee: Clifford Daypuyat (Philippines)

20 November 2018 2018 AFF Championship	Cambodia	3–1	Laos	Phnom Penh, Cambodia
18:30 UTC+7	Chan Vathanaka 17'; Prak Mony Udom 35' (pen.); Keo Sokpheng 76'		Somxay 75'	Stadium: Phnom Penh Olympic Stadium; Attendance: 25,085; Referee: Nathan Chan (Singapore)

24 November 2018 2018 AFF Championship	Vietnam	3–0	Cambodia	Hanoi, Vietnam
19:30 UTC+7	Nguyễn Tiến Linh 39'; Nguyễn Quang Hải 41'; Phan Văn Đức 61'			Stadium: Hàng Đẫy Stadium; Attendance: 14,000; Referee: Ma Ning (China)

=== 2019 ===
6 February 2019 Hybrid friendly	Cambodia All Stars	0-3	African All Star	Phnom Penh, Cambodia
18:00 UTC+7		Report		Stadium: Phnom Penh National Olympic Stadium

9 February 2019 Hybrid Friendly	Cambodia All Stars	2-1	Muangthong United	Phnom Penh, Cambodia
18:30 UTC+7		Report		Stadium: Olympic Stadium

9 March 2019 Friendly	Cambodia	0–1	Bangladesh	Phnom Penh, Cambodia
18:30 UTC+7		Report	Robiul 83'	Stadium: Phnom Penh Olympic Stadium; Referee: Wiwat Jumpaoon (Thailand)

6 June 2019 2022 WCQ R1	Cambodia	2–0	Pakistan	Phnom Penh, Cambodia
18:30 UTC+7	Chanthea 81'; Sokumpheak 84'	Report		Stadium: Phnom Penh Olympic Stadium; Attendance: 33,706; Referee: Shaun Evans (Australia)

11 June 2019 2022 WCQ R1	Pakistan	1–2	Cambodia	Doha, Qatar (Note: Pakistan played their home match against Cambodia in Qatar.)
19:00 UTC+3	Bashir 18' (pen.)	Report	Rosib 64'; Bunheing 89'	Stadium: Hamad bin Khalifa Stadium; Attendance: 300; Referee: Hanna Hattab (Syria)

5 September 2019 2022 WCQ R2	Cambodia	1–1	Hong Kong	Phnom Penh, Cambodia
18:30 UTC+7	Sokpheng 33'	Report (FIFA); Report (AFC)	Tan Chun Lok 16'	Stadium: Phnom Penh Olympic Stadium; Attendance: 45,500; Referee: Ilgiz Tantashev (Uzbekistan)

10 September 2019 2022 WCQ R2	Cambodia	0–1	Bahrain	Phnom Penh, Cambodia
18:30 UTC+7		Report (FIFA); Report (AFC)	Al Aswad 78'	Stadium: Phnom Penh Olympic Stadium; Attendance: 55,000; Referee: Nivon Robesh Gamini (Sri Lanka)

10 October 2019 2022 WCQ R2	Iran	14–0	Cambodia	Tehran, Iran
17:00 UTC+3:30	Nourollahi 5'; Azmoun 11', 35', 44'; Kanaani 18'; Taremi 22', 54'; Ansarifard 40', 48', 60', 88'; Mohebi 65', 67'; Mohammadi 85'	Report (FIFA); Report (AFC)		Stadium: Azadi Stadium; Attendance: 15,823; Referee: Pranjal Banerjee (India)

15 October 2019 2022 WCQ R2	Cambodia	0–4	Iraq	Phnom Penh, Cambodia
18:30 UTC+7		Report (FIFA); Report (AFC)	Bayesh 22'; Ali 41'; Attwan 57'; Ibrahim 62'	Stadium: Phnom Penh Olympic Stadium; Attendance: 48,258; Referee: Clifford Daypuyat (Philippines)

14 November 2019 Friendly	Cambodia	1–1	Mongolia	Phnom Penh, Cambodia
18:30 UTC+7	Sokpheng 35' (pen.)		Narmandakh Artag 21'	Stadium: Phnom Penh Olympic Stadium

19 November 2019 2022 WCQ R2	Hong Kong	2–0	Cambodia	Hong Kong Island, Hong Kong
20:00 UTC+8	Ha 20'; Roberto 84'	Report (FIFA); Report (AFC)		Stadium: Hong Kong Stadium; Attendance: 6,497; Referee: Ali Shaban (Kuwait)

== Head-to-head records ==
Cambodia national football team head-to-head records (2010–2019)
Opponent	Pld	W	D	L	GF	GA	GD	Pts	Confederation
Afghanistan	4	1	0	3	2	6	–4	3	AFC
Bahrain	1	0	0	1	0	1	–1	0	AFC
Bangladesh	1	0	0	1	0	1	–1	0	AFC
Bhutan	1	1	0	0	2	0	+2	3	AFC
Brunei	4	3	0	1	12	4	+8	9	AFC
Chinese Taipei	3	2	1	0	6	2	+4	7	AFC
Guam	1	0	0	1	0	2	–2	0	AFC
Hong Kong	4	0	1	3	3	9	–6	1	AFC
India	1	0	0	1	2	3	–1	0	AFC
Indonesia	2	0	0	2	1	3	–2	0	AFC
Iran	1	0	0	1	0	14	–14	0	AFC
Iraq	1	0	0	1	0	4	–4	0	AFC
Japan	2	0	0	2	0	5	–5	0	AFC
Jordan	2	0	0	2	0	8	–8	0	AFC
Kyrgyzstan	1	0	0	1	3	4	–1	0	AFC
Laos	10	4	2	4	16	17	–1	14	AFC
Macau	4	2	1	1	9	5	+4	7	AFC
Malaysia	5	0	0	5	4	14	–10	0	AFC
Maldives	2	0	0	2	2	7	–5	0	AFC
Mongolia	1	0	1	0	1	1	0	1	AFC
Myanmar	6	1	0	5	4	13	–9	3	AFC
Pakistan	2	2	0	0	4	1	+3	6	AFC
Philippines	3	0	2	1	0	3	–3	2	AFC
Singapore	7	1	0	6	6	15	–9	3	AFC
Sri Lanka	1	1	0	0	4	0	+4	3	AFC
Syria	2	0	0	2	0	12	–12	0	AFC
Tajikistan	1	0	0	1	0	3	–3	0	AFC
Timor-Leste	6	4	1	1	15	13	+2	13	AFC
Turkmenistan	1	0	0	1	0	7	–7	0	AFC
Vietnam	4	0	0	4	2	12	–10	0	AFC
Total	84	22	9	53	98	189	–91	75	
