= Passang Tshering =

Bhutanese footballer & coach (born 1983)

Personal information
- Full name: Passang Tshering
- Date of birth: 16 July 1983 (age 43)
- Place of birth: Thimphu, Bhutan
- Height: 1.75 m (5 ft 9 in)
- Positions: Attacking midfielder; forward

Senior career*
| Years | Team | Apps | (Gls) |
| 2003–2008 | Transport United | | (45+) |
| 2009–2011 | Druk Star | | |
| 2011–2013 | Zimdra | | |
| 2013–2019 | Thimphu City | | |
| 2021–2022 | Tyros United | | |

International career
| 2003–2015 | Bhutan | 40 | (5) |
| | Bhutan national futsal team | 6 | (3) |
- * Club domestic league appearances and goals

Passang Tshering (born 16 July 1983) is a Bhutanese former professional footballer and current coach. Passang played mainly as a forward. He also played futsal for Terton and Thimphu City.

In 2007, he won the title of A-Division top-scorer with 28 goals. On 4 August 2007, Passang Tshering could go down in the history of football for three reasons: scoring a hat-trick within three minutes, scoring nine goals in one half, and scoring the most goals in a single game. “I didn’t expect to score 17", but there is no reason to celebrate or feel great because we played against a weak team”.

== Career statistics ==
=== International ===
Appearances and goals by national team and year
| National team | Year | Apps | Goals |
|---|---|---|---|
| Bhutan | 2002 | 1 | 0 |
| Bhutan | 2003 | 11 | 1 |
| Bhutan | 2004 | – | |
| Bhutan | 2005 | 2 | 0 |
| Bhutan | 2006 | 2 | 0 |
| Bhutan | 2007 | – | |
| Bhutan | 2008 | 7 | 1 |
| Bhutan | 2009 | 7 | 1 |
| Bhutan | 2010 | – | |
| Bhutan | 2011 | 3 | 0 |
| Bhutan | 2012 | 1 | 0 |
| Bhutan | 2013 | 3 | 2 |
| Bhutan | 2014 | – | |
| Bhutan | 2015 | 3 | 0 |
| Total | | 40 | 5 |

Scores and results list Bhutan's goal tally first, score column indicates score after each Tshering goal.

List of international goals scored by Passang Tshering
| No. | Date | Venue | Opponent | Score | Result | Competition |
|---|---|---|---|---|---|---|
| 1 | 23 April 2003 | Changlimithang Stadium, Thimphu, Bhutan | Guam | 4–0 | 6–0 | 2004 AFC Asian Cup qualification |
| 2 | 13 May 2008 | Barotac Nuevo Plaza Field, Barotac Nuevo, Philippines | Tajikistan | 1–2 | 1–3 | 2008 AFC Challenge Cup qualification |
| 3 | 29 November 2009 | Mohammedan Sporting Ground, Kolkata, India | Nepal | 1–1 | 1–2 | Friendly |
| 4 | 4 September 2013 | Dasarath Rangasala Stadium, Kathmandu, Nepal | Maldives | 1–1 | 2–8 | 2013 SAFF Championship |
| 5 | 6 September 2013 | Halchowk Stadium, Kathmandu, Nepal | Sri Lanka | 1–3 | 2–5 | 2013 SAFF Championship |
