= 2016 Bangabandhu Cup =

2016 Bangabandhu Gold Cup
Tournament details
- Host country: Bangladesh
- Dates: 8–22 January
- Teams: 8 (from 1 confederation)
- Venues: 2 in 2 host cities

Final positions
- Champions: Nepal (1st title)
- Runners-up: Bahrain U21

Tournament statistics
- Matches played: 15
- Goals scored: 34 (2.27 per match)
- Top scorer(s): (Nepal) Nawayug Shrestha (4 goals)
- Best player: (Nepal) Nawayug Shrestha

The 2016 Bangabandhu Cup or 2016 Bangabandhu Gold Cup was an international association football tournament organised by the Bangladesh Football Federation as a tribute to Father of the Nation Bangabandhu Sheikh Mujibur Rahman. Launched in 1996, it was the 4th time the Bangabandhu Cup had been held. Eight teams from the Asian Football Confederation participated in this edition.

== Format ==
In the group stage, six teams were divided into two groups of three teams, playing a single round-robin, with the teams finishing first and second in each group qualifying to the semi-finals.

== Prize money ==
- Winner: ৳4,250,000.
- Runner-up: ৳2,000,000.

== Referees ==
- Sivakorn Pu-Udon (Thailand)
- Mohmed Jalal Vddin (BAN)
- Bhubon Tarafder (BAN)
- Hien Triet Nguyen (Vietnam)
- Omar Al-Yacobi (Oman)
- Pranjal Banerjee (India)

== Broadcasters ==
- Channel 9
- Bangladesh Television-BTV

== Participating nations ==
The following nations have entered the competition:

Group A
Bangladesh
(Malaysia) Felda United
Nepal
Sri Lanka
Group B
Bahrain U-21
Bangladesh U-23
Cambodia
Maldives

== Venues ==
Fifteen matches were played at two different venues in Dhaka and Jessore: The Bangabandhu National Stadium in Dhaka, and Shamsul Huda Stadium in Jessore.

Dhaka	Jessore
Bangabandhu National Stadium	Shamsul Huda Stadium
Capacity: 36,000	Capacity: 12,000
2016 Bangabandhu Cup is located in Bangladesh

== Group stage ==
=== Group A ===
Pos	Team	Pld	W	D	L	GF	GA	GD	Pts	Qualification
1	Bangladesh (H)	3	1	2	0	5	3	+2	5	Knockout stage
2	Nepal	3	1	2	0	1	0	+1	5	Knockout stage
3	Sri Lanka	3	1	0	2	4	6	−2	3	
4	(Malaysia) Felda United	3	0	2	1	2	3	−1	2	

Source: RSSSF
(H) Hosts
8 January 2016
2:45 PM BDT

Bangladesh	4–2	Sri Lanka
Rony 17', 86'; Zahid 22'; Jibon 42'	Report	Figurado 21' (pen.); Chaturanga 52'

Shamsul Huda Stadium, Jessore
Attendance: 12,000
Referee: Sivakorn Pu-Udom (Thailand)

9 January 2016
2:45 PM BDT

Nepal	0–0	(Malaysia) Felda United

Shamsul Huda Stadium, Jessore
Attendance: 6,000
Referee: Mohamed Jalal Uddin (Bangladesh)

13 January 2016
3:00 PM BDT

Nepal	1–0	Sri Lanka
Magar 2'

Bangabandhu National Stadium, Dhaka
Attendance: 400
Referee: Bhubon Tarafder (Bangladesh)
13 January 2016
6:30 PM BDT

Bangladesh	1–1	(Malaysia) Felda United
Mithun 76'		Hadin 55'

Bangabandhu National Stadium, Dhaka
Attendance: 6,400
Referee: Hien Triet Nguyen (Vietnam)

15 January 2016
3:00 PM BDT

Felda United (Malaysia)	1–2	Sri Lanka
Alias 82'		Nipuna Bandara 19'; Chaturanga 64'

Bangabandhu National Stadium, Dhaka
Attendance: 300
Referee: Omar Al-Yacoubi (Oman)
15 January 2016
6:30 PM BDT

Bangladesh	0–0	Nepal

Bangabandhu National Stadium, Dhaka
Attendance: 8,000
Referee: Sivakorn Pu-Udom (Thailand)

=== Group B ===
Pos	Team	Pld	W	D	L	GF	GA	GD	Pts	Qualification
1	Maldives	3	2	1	0	6	3	+3	7	Knockout stage
2	Bahrain U-21	3	1	2	0	3	2	+1	5	Knockout stage
3	Cambodia	3	1	0	2	3	4	−1	3	
4	Bangladesh U-23 (H)	3	0	1	2	1	4	−3	1	

Source: RSSSF
(H) Hosts
10 January 2016
2:45 PM BDT

Bangladesh U-23	1–1	Bahrain U-21
Yousuf Sifat 18'		Jasim Alshakikh 23'

Shamsul Huda Stadium, Jessore
Attendance: 11,000
Referee: Pranjal Banerjee (India)

11 January 2016
2:45 PM BDT

Maldives	3–2	Cambodia
Ismail Easa 6'; Naaiz Hassan 38', 79'		Sun Vandeth 15'; Tith Dina 45+1'

Shamsul Huda Stadium, Jessore
Attendance: 10,000
Referee: Omar Al-Yacoubi (Oman)

14 January 2016
3:00 PM BDT

Bahrain U-21	1–0	Cambodia
Abdul Aziz Al Shaikh 11'

Bangabandhu National Stadium, Dhaka
Attendance: 800
Referee: Mohamed Jalal Uddin (Bangladesh)
14 January 2016
6:30 PM BDT

Bangladesh U-23	0–2	Maldives
		Ismail Easa 16'; Ahmed Imaz 22'

Bangabandhu National Stadium, Dhaka
Attendance: 3,200
Referee: Omar Al-Yacoubi (Oman)

16 January 2016
3:00 PM BDT

Bahrain U-23	1–1	Maldives
Anwar Ali 58'		Ahmed Imaz 18'

Bangabandhu National Stadium, Dhaka
Attendance: 200
Referee: Pranjal Banerjee (India)
16 January 2016
6:30 PM BDT

Cambodia	1–0	Bangladesh U-23
Tith Dina 71'

Bangabandhu National Stadium, Dhaka
Attendance: 3000
Referee: Omar Al-Yacoubi (Oman)

== Knockout stage ==
=== Bracket ===
Round 1
18 January – Dhaka
Bangladesh	0
Bahrain U-21	1
19 January – Dhaka
Maldives	1
Nepal	4

Round 2
22 January – Dhaka
Bahrain U-21	0
Nepal	3

=== Semi-finals ===
18 January 2016
5:30 PM BDT

Bangladesh	0–1	Bahrain U-21
		Ebrahim Alhooti 45+1'

Bangabandhu National Stadium, Dhaka
Attendance: 8,000
Referee: Sivakorn Pu-Udom (Thailand)

19 January 2016
5:30 PM BDT

Maldives	1–4	Nepal
Ahmed Nashid 76'		Nawayug Shrestha 31', 61', 90+2'; Bishal Rai 52'

Bangabandhu National Stadium, Dhaka
Attendance: 6,000
Referee: Omar Al-Yacoubi (Oman)

=== Final ===
22 January 2016
5:00 PM BDT

Bahrain U-21	0–3	Nepal
		Bimal Gharti Magar 5'; Bishal Rai 87'; Nawayug Shrestha 90+2'

Bangabandhu National Stadium, Dhaka
Attendance: 16,000
- This was the first win by Nepal in any tournament in 23 years. Striker Bimal Gharti Magar won the Man Of The Match for his goal and assist.

== Awards ==
2016 Bangabandhu Cup champions

Nepal
First title

== Goalscorers ==
4 Goals

- (Nepal) Nawayug Shrestha

2 Goals

- (Nepal) Bimal Gharti Magar
- (Nepal) Bishal Rai
- (Bangladesh) Shakhawat Hossain Rony
- (Maldives) Naaiz Hassan
- (Maldives) Ismail Easa
- (Sri Lanka) Chaturanga
- (Cambodia) Tith Dina
- (Maldives) Ahmed Imaz
