= Batmönkh =

Batmönkh (Mongolian: Батмөнх) is a Mongolian personal name. Notable people bearing this name include:

As proper name

- Jambyn Batmönkh (1926–1997), Mongolian communist political leader and economics professor

As patronymic

- Batmönkhiin Erkhembayar (born 1991), Mongolian international footballer
- Kyokutenzan Takeshi (born 1973 as Batmönkhiin Enkhbat), former professional sumo wrestler from Mongolia
