= Nalaka Roshan =

Sri Lankan footballer

Personal information
- Date of birth: 29 January 1993 (age 33)
- Place of birth: Sri Lanka
- Position: Midfielder

Team information
- Current team: Army

Senior career*
Years	Team	Apps	(Gls)
2013–	Army		

International career
2014–2016	Sri Lanka	10	(1)
- * Club domestic league appearances and goals

Nalaka Roshan is a Sri Lankan international footballer who plays as a midfielder.

== International career ==
=== International goals ===
Scores and results list Sri Lanka's goal tally first.

Goal	Date	Venue	Opponent	Score	Result	Competition
1.	24 October 2014	Shamsul Huda Stadium, Jessore, Bangladesh	Bangladesh	1–1	1–1	Friendly
