= Mohamed Zahid Hossain =

Bangladeshi footballer (born 1988)

Zahid Hossain
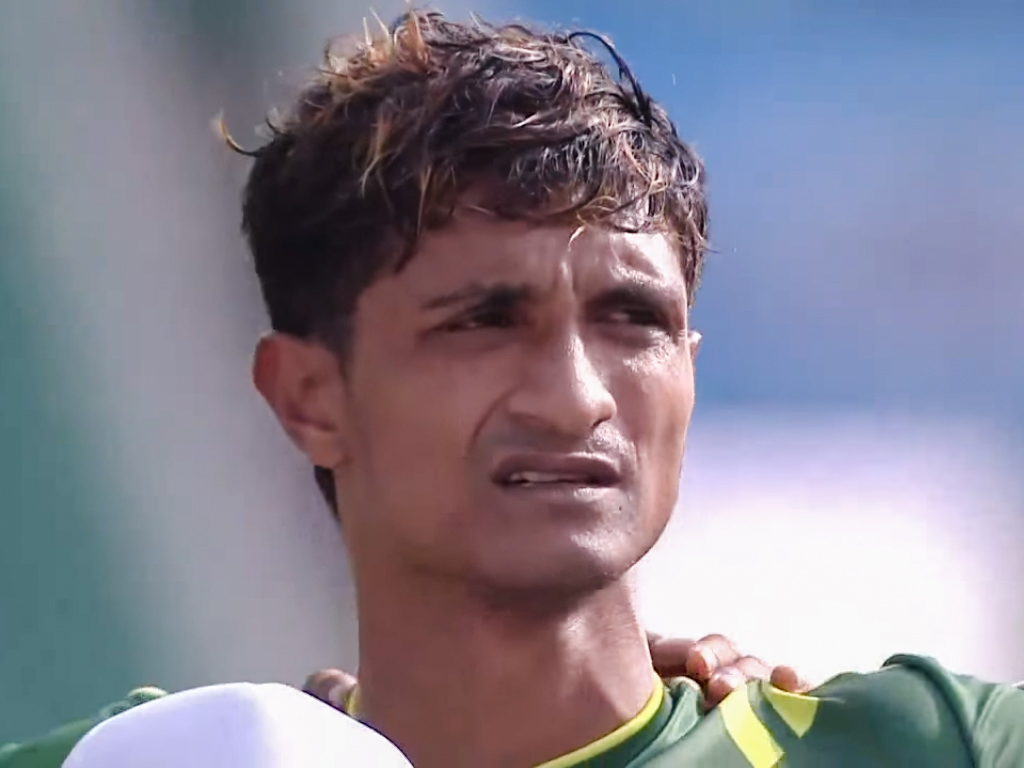
- Zahid with Bangladesh at the 2015 SAFF Championship

Personal information
- Full name: Mohamed Zahid Hossain
- Date of birth: 15 June 1988 (age 38)
- Place of birth: Tangail, Bangladesh
- Height: 1.73 m (5 ft 8 in)
- Positions: Midfielder; winger

Senior career*
Years	Team	Apps	(Gls)
2005–2008	Mohammedan SC	?	(?)
2008–2009	Brothers Union	?	(6)
2009–2010	Mohammedan SC	?	(1)
2010–2011	Sheikh Jamal DC	?	(2)
2012	Abahani Limited Dhaka	?	(3)
2012–2015	Sheikh Russel KC	?	(11)
2016–2018	Chittagong Abahani	41	(10)
2019–2020	Arambagh KS	16	(6)
2020–2021	Sheikh Jamal DC	15	(0)
2021–2022	Chittagong Abahani	14	(0)

International career
2003–2004	Bangladesh U17	5	(2)
2007–2010	Bangladesh U23	12	(2)
2007–2016	Bangladesh	36	(6)
Medal record
Representing Bangladesh U-23
South Asian Games
Gold medal – first place	2010
- * Club domestic league appearances and goals as of 02 August 2022

Mohamed Zahid Hossain (Bengali: মোহাম্মদ জাহিদ হোসেন; born 15 June 1988) is a Bangladeshi footballer who last played as a winger for Chittagong Abahani. He also represented the Bangladesh national team, making his international debut in 2007.

== International goals ==
=== National team ===
Scores and results list Bangladesh's goal tally first.

#	Date	Venue	Opponent	Score	Result	Competition
1.	30 April 2009	Bangabandhu National Stadium, Dhaka	Macau	2–0	3–0	2010 AFC Challenge Cup qualification
2.	30 April 2009	Bangabandhu National Stadium, Dhaka	Macau	3–0	3–0	2010 AFC Challenge Cup qualification
3.	18 February 2010	Sugathadasa Stadium, Colombo	Myanmar	1–2	1–2	2010 AFC Challenge Cup
4.	29 June 2011	Bangabandhu National Stadium, Dhaka	Pakistan	2–0	3–0	2014 FIFA World Cup qualification
5.	20 September 2012	Dashrath Stadium, Katmundu	Nepal	1–0	1–1	International friendly
6.	8 January 2016	Shamsul Huda Stadium, Jessore	Sri Lanka	2–1	4–2	2016 Bangabandhu Cup
