= Bishal Rai =

Nepalese footballer

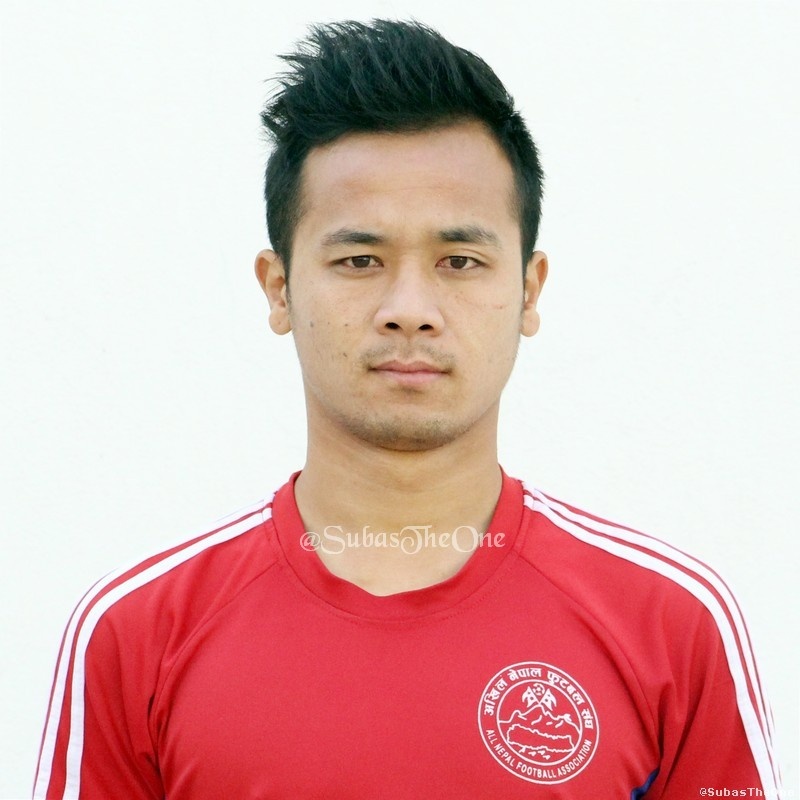

Personal information
- Full name: Bishal Rai
- Date of birth: 6 June 1993 (age 33)
- Place of birth: Jhapa, Nepal
- Height: 5 ft 7 in (1.70 m)
- Position: Attacking midfielder

Team information
- Current team: Manang Marshyangdi F.C.

Youth career
- ANFA Jhapa Academy

Senior career*
Years	Team	Apps	(Gls)
2008–2014	Machhindra F.C.		
2010	→ Saraswoti Y.C. (loan)		
2014–	Manang Marshyangdi F.C.		

International career^{‡}
- Nepal U-16
- Nepal U-19
2014–	Nepal	28	(3)
- * Club domestic league appearances and goals ‡ National team caps and goals as of 2 September 2021

Bishal Rai (born 6 June 1993, in Jhapa District) is a Nepalese professional footballer who plays as an attacking midfielder for Manang Marshyangdi Club and the Nepal national football team.

== Career ==
Bishal Rai started off in the ANFA Jhapa Youth Academy before joining Machhindra F.C. in 2008. He played for Machindra for four years straight with the exception of a loan move to Saraswoti Youth Club two years after arriving. Later in 2014 he joined Manang Marshyangdi Club ahead of the 2013–14 Martyr's Memorial A-Division League season.

== International career ==
Rai played for Nepal at the u-14, u-16 and u-19 youth levels. After being routinely called up for the senior squad since 2014 Rai finally made his senior national team debut on 31 August 2015 in a friendly against India. Bishal Rai scored his first goal for Nepal in a 4–1 win against Maldives in the Bangabandhu gold cup on 19 January 2016.

=== International goals ===
Scores and results list Nepal's goal tally first.

No	Date	Venue	Opponent	Score	Result	Competition
1.	19 January 2016	Bangabandhu National Stadium, Dhaka, Bangladesh	Maldives	2–0	4–1	2016 Bangabandhu Cup
2.	29 May 2016	New Laos National Stadium, Vientiane, Laos	Laos	1–0	1–1	Friendly
3.	28 March 2017	Taipei Municipal Stadium, Tapei, Chinese Taipei	Philippines	1–3	1–4	2019 AFC Asian Cup qualification
