= Wang Ruei =

Taiwanese footballer

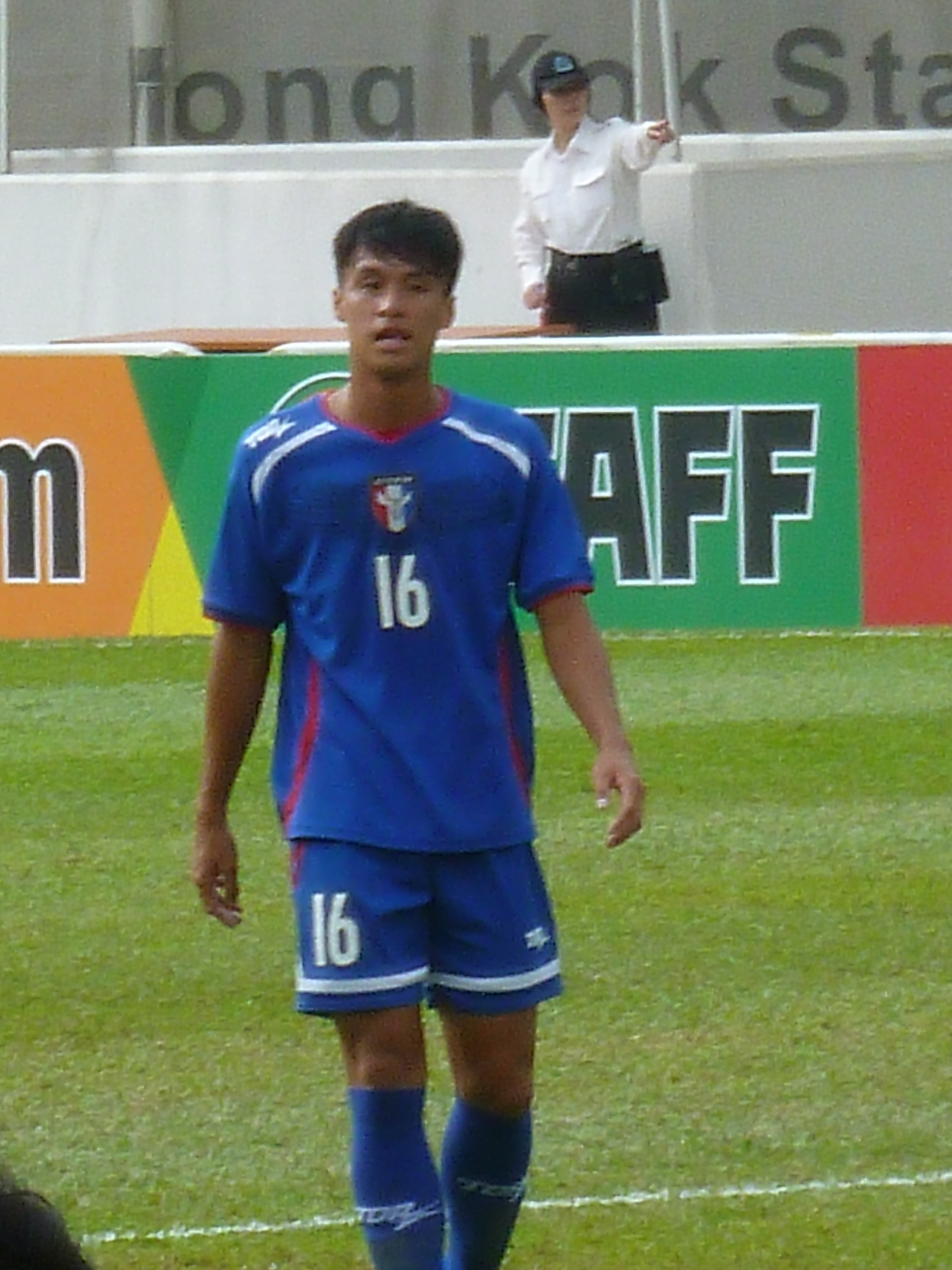

Personal information
- Full name: Wang Ruei
- Date of birth: 10 August 1993 (age 33)
- Place of birth: Hualien, Taiwan
- Height: 1.83 m (6 ft 0 in)
- Position: Centre back

Team information
- Current team: Taiwan Steel
- Number: 5

College career
Years	Team	Apps	(Gls)
2010–2015	NTUPES		

Senior career*
Years	Team	Apps	(Gls)
2015–2016	NSTC		
2016–2017	NTUPES		
2017–2018	Taipower		
2019–2020	Yuen Long	14	(2)
2020–2023	Taichung Futuro	16	(0)
2023–	Taiwan Steel	0	(0)

International career^{‡}
2015–	Chinese Taipei	25	(1)
2018	Chinese Taipei U23	3	(0)
- * Club domestic league appearances and goals as of 30 July 2020 ‡ National team caps and goals as of 13 November 2026

Wang Ruei (Chinese: 王睿; born 10 August 1993) is a Taiwanese professional footballer who currently plays for Taiwan Football Premier League club Taiwan Steel and the Chinese Taipei national team.

== Career ==
Wang Ruei made his international debut for Chinese Taipei in their 2018 FIFA World Cup qualification – AFC first round first leg loss to Brunei. In the return leg, he would go on to score a goal which would help Chinese Taipei to win 2–0, and progress through to the next round 2–1 on aggregate.

On 27 December 2018, it was announced that Wang would join Hong Kong Premier League side Yuen Long. On 12 June 2019, assistant manager Fabio Lopes confirmed that Wang would be retained for the following season.

On 2 May 2020, Wang announced that his contract with Yuen Long had been terminated.

=== International goals ===
Scores and results list Chinese Taipei's goal tally first.

#	Date	Venue	Opponent	Score	Result	Competition
1.	17 March 2015	Sultan Hassanal Bolkiah Stadium, Bandar Seri Begawan	Brunei	1–0	2–0	2018 FIFA World Cup qualification

== Personal life ==
Wang hails from the Mataan tribe of the Amis people. His cousin Wang Xianghui is the captain of the Chinese Taipei women's football team.
