= Sun Vandeth =

Cambodian footballer

Personal information
- Full name: Sun Vandeth
- Date of birth: August 22, 1997 (age 29)
- Place of birth: Koh Kong, Cambodia
- Height: 1.60 m (5 ft 3 in)
- Position: Forward

Team information
- Current team: Phnom Penh City
- Number: 19

Senior career*
Years	Team	Apps	(Gls)
2013–2023	National Police Commissary	124	(47)
2026–	Phnom Penh City		

International career
2011	Cambodia U-16		
2015	Cambodia U-19	5	(1)
2017–2019	Cambodia U-22	9	(0)
2015–2016	Cambodia	5	(1)
- * Club domestic league appearances and goals

Sun Vandeth (Khmer: ស៊ុន វណ្ណដេត born 22 August 1997) is a Cambodian footballer who plays for the Phnom Penh City in the Cambodian League 2 and used to represent Cambodia national football team. He made his national debut in a 6–0 loss against Syria in the a 2018 World Cup Qualifying match on 24 March 2016. Vandeth also represented the national team during the 2016 Bangabandhu Cup in Bangladesh.

== International goals ==
Scores and results list Cambodia goal tally first.

#	Date	Venue	Opponent	Score	Result	Competition
1.	11 January 2016	Shamsul Huda Stadium, Bangladesh	Maldives	1–1	2–3	2016 Bangabandhu Cup
