= Nawang Dhendup =

Bhutanese former footballer

Nawang Dendup
Personal information
- Full name: Nawang Dendup
- Date of birth: 20 September 1980 (age 46)
- Place of birth: Thimphu, Bhutan
- Date of death: 13 July 2026 (aged 45)
- Height: 1.75 m (5 ft 9 in)
- Positions: Midfielder; attacking midfielder

Senior career*
Years	Team	Apps	(Gls)
2005–2006	Transport United		
2006–2007	New Road Team		
2007–2008	Transport United		
2009–2016	Druk Star		

International career
2005–2015	Bhutan	10	(2)
- * Club domestic league appearances and goals

Nawang Dendup (also pronounced Dhendup) was a Bhutanese footballer and coach. He made his first appearance for the Bhutan national football team in 2005.

== Career statistics ==
=== International goals ===
#	Date	Venue	Opponent	Score	Result	Competition
1	15 May 2008	Barotac Nuevo Plaza Field, Iloilo City, Philippines	Brunei	1–1	Draw	2008 AFC CC Q.
2	4 December 2009	Bangabandhu National Stadium, Dhaka, Bangladesh	Bangladesh	4–1	Lost	2009 SAFF C.
Correct as of 25 July 2013
