= Jamshed Anwar =

Pakistani footballer

Personal information
- Full name: Muhammad Jamshed Anwar
- Date of birth: 20 November 1974 (age 51)
- Place of birth: Faisalabad, Pakistan
- Height: 1.78 m (5 ft 10 in)
- Position: Centre-back

Senior career*
| Years | Team | Apps | (Gls) |
| 2002–2009 | WAPDA | | |

International career
| 2003–2008 | Pakistan | 2 | (2) |
- * Club domestic league appearances and goals

Muhammad Jamshed Anwar (born 20 November 1974) is a Pakistani former footballer, who played as a centre-back for WAPDA throughout his career.

== Club career ==
Anwar played for departmental side WAPDA throughout his career, winning the 2004–05, 2007–08, and 2008–09 Pakistan Premier League. He also played at the AFC President Cup with the club.

== International career ==
Anwar was first called by Pakistan at the 2006 FIFA World Cup qualification in 2003. He was again called at the 2008 AFC Challenge Cup qualification, where he scored the two first goals in a 9–2 victory against Guam.

== Career statistics ==
=== International ===
Appearances and goals by national team and year
| National team | Year | Apps | Goals |
|---|---|---|---|
| Pakistan | 2003 | 1 | 0 |
| Pakistan | 2008 | 1 | 2 |
| Total | | 2 | 2 |

Scores and results list Pakistan's goal tally first, score column indicates score after each Anwar goal.

List of international goals scored by Jamshed Anwar
| No. | Date | Venue | Opponent | Score | Result | Competition |
|---|---|---|---|---|---|---|
| 1 | 6 April 2008 | Zhongshan Soccer Stadium, Taipei, Taiwan | Guam | 1–0 | 9–2 | 2008 AFC Challenge Cup qualification |
| 2 | 6 April 2008 | Zhongshan Soccer Stadium, Taipei, Taiwan | Guam | 2–0 | 9–2 | 2008 AFC Challenge Cup qualification |

== Honours ==
=== WAPDA ===
- Pakistan Premier League: 2004-05, 2007-08, 2008-09
