= Ismail Easa =

Maldivian footballer (born 1989)

Personal information
- Full name: Ismail Easa
- Date of birth: 19 December 1989 (age 36)
- Place of birth: R. Dhuvaafaru, Maldives
- Height: 1.78 m (5 ft 10 in)
- Positions: Attacking midfielder; forward

Team information
- Current team: Club Eagles
- Number: 10

Youth career
- Victory

Senior career*
Years	Team	Apps	(Gls)
–2010	Victory		
2011	VB Sports	10	(3)
2012–2013	Maziya	15	(2)
2013	New Radiant		(2)
2014–2015	Club Eagles		(13)
2016	Maziya		(3)
2017	Victory		(4)
2017–2018	Maziya		(9)
2019–2020	TC Sports		(12)
2020–2021	United Victory		
2022	Club Valencia		
2023–	Club Eagles		
2026–	STO RC (futsal)	6	(4)
2026–	Dhuvaafaru SC (futsal)	1	(0)

International career^{‡}
- Maldives U19
- Maldives U23
2012–	Maldives	29	(3)
- * Club domestic league appearances and goals ‡ National team caps and goals as of November 13, 2021

Ismail Easa (born 19 December 1989) is a Maldivian professional footballer who plays as a forward and an attacking midfielder for the Dhivehi Premier League club United Victory and the Maldives national team.

== International career ==
Easa made his debut for the Maldives' senior team in their first match of the 2012 Nehru Cup against Nepal on 23 August 2012, coming on to play in the 73rd minute, replacing Mohamed Umair and also scored his first goal from a through ball from Ahmed Rasheed, in the 77th minute.

== Career statistics ==
=== International goals ===
==== Senior team ====
Scores and results list Maldives goal tally first.

#	Date	Venue	Opponent	Score	Result	Competition
1.	23 August 2012	Nehru Stadium, India	Nepal	0–2	1–2	2012 Nehru Cup
2.	11 January 2016	Shamsul Huda Stadium, Bangladesh	Cambodia	1–0	3–2	2016 Bangabandhu Cup
3.	1 September 2016	National Football Stadium, Maldives	Bangladesh	5–0	5–0	Friendly
