= Chiquito do Carmo =

East Timorese footballer

Personal information
- Full name: Chiquito Filipe do Carmo
- Date of birth: 25 October 1986 (age 40)
- Place of birth: Dili, Indonesia (now Timor Leste)
- Height: 1.68 m (5 ft 6 in)
- Position: Striker

Team information
- Current team: Persiku Dynamo Kupang
- Number: 20

Senior career*
Years	Team	Apps	(Gls)
2010–2015	Ad. Dili Leste	68	(52)
2015–	Persiku Dynamo Kupang		

International career^{‡}
2010–2016	Timor-Leste	16	(4)
- * Club domestic league appearances and goals ‡ National team caps and goals as of 26 January 2017

Chiquito Filipe do Carmo, known simply as Chiquito or Quito (born October 25, 1986) is a football player. He is the current forward for the Timor-Leste national football team.

== International career ==
Chiquito made his international debut against the Philippines in the 2010 AFF Suzuki Cup qualification on 22 October 2010 and scored his first goal on 24 October 2010 when facing Cambodia at the same event.

He also scored Timor-Leste's first goal of the 2018 FIFA World Cup qualifiers against Mongolia in the 4th minute. He doubled the score three minutes after, in a match Timor-Leste would win by 4–1.

=== International goals ===
Scores and results list East Timor's goal tally first.

Goal	Date	Venue	Opponent	Score	Result	Competition
1.	24 October 2010	New Laos National Stadium, Vientiane, Laos	Cambodia	1–0	2–4	2010 AFF Championship qualification
2.	26 October 2010	New Laos National Stadium, Vientiane, Laos	Laos	1–0	1–6	2010 AFF Championship qualification
3.	12 March 2015	National Stadium, Dili, East Timor	Mongolia	1–0	4–1	2018 FIFA World Cup qualification
4.	12 March 2015	National Stadium, Dili, East Timor	Mongolia	2–0	4–1	2018 FIFA World Cup qualification
