= 2010 AFF Championship qualification =

Tournament details
- Host country: Laos
- Dates: 22 – 26 October 2010
- Teams: 4
- Venue: 1 (in 1 host city)

Tournament statistics
- Matches played: 6
- Goals scored: 22 (3.67 per match)
- Top scorer(s): (Cambodia) Khim Borey (Philippines) Ian Araneta (3 goals each)

The 2010 AFF Championship qualification tournament was held in Vientiane, Laos from 22 to 26 October 2010 for the five lower-ranked teams in Southeast Asia. All teams played in a round-robin tournament format with the winner and runner-up qualifying for the final tournament. However, the qualification was held without Brunei, due to FIFA's continued suspension of the Football Association of Brunei Darussalam, thus barring them from the competition. The draw for the qualifying round and competition proper took place on 15 September 2010.

== Venue ==
(Laos) Vientiane
New Laos National Stadium
Capacity: 25,000

== Results ==
- All times are Indochina Time (ICT) – UTC+7

Key to colours in group tables
Group winner and runner-up qualify for the final tournament

Team	Pld	W	D	L	GF	GA	GD	Pts
Laos (H)	3	1	2	0	8	3	+5	5
Philippines	3	1	2	0	7	2	+5	5
Cambodia	3	1	2	0	4	2	+2	5
Timor-Leste	3	0	0	3	3	15	−12	0

Source: AFF
(H) Hosts
22 October 2010
16:00

Timor-Leste	0 – 5	Philippines
	Report	Araneta 27', 41', 57'; P. Younghusband 30' (pen.); Del Rosario 32'

National Sports Complex, Vientiane
Referee: Leow Thiam Hoe (Singapore)
22 October 2010
18:30

Laos	0 – 0	Cambodia
	Report

National Sports Complex, Vientiane
Referee: Mohd Nafeez Abdul Wahab (Malaysia)

24 October 2010
16:00

Cambodia	4 – 2	Timor-Leste
Borey 26', 29', 40'; Sinoun 75'	Report	Chiquito 5'; Anggisu 84'

National Sports Complex, Vientiane
Referee: Phung Dinh Dung (Vietnam)
24 October 2010
18:30

Philippines	2 – 2	Laos
P. Younghusband 76' (pen.); J. Younghusband 90+4'	Report	Soukaphone 28'; Kanlaya 40'

National Sports Complex, Vientiane
Referee: Mongkolchai Pechsri (Thailand)

26 October 2010
16:00

Philippines	0 – 0	Cambodia
	Report

National Sports Complex, Vientiane
Referee: Mohd Nafeez Abdul Wahab (Malaysia)
26 October 2010
18:30

Laos	6 – 1	Timor-Leste
Kovanh 11'; Soukaphone 16'; Lamnao 47' (pen.); Konekham 59'; Kanlaya 61'; Ketsada 78'	Report	Chiquito 8'

National Sports Complex, Vientiane
Referee: Phùng Đình Dũng (Vietnam)

== Goalscorers ==
3 goals

- (Cambodia) Khim Borey
- (Philippines) Ian Araneta

2 goals

- (Laos) Kanlaya Sysomvang
- (Laos) Soukaphone Vongchiengkham
- (Philippines) Phil Younghusband
- (Timor-Leste) Chiquito do Carmo

1 goal

- (Cambodia) Nuth Sinoun
- (Laos) Ketsada Souksavanh
- (Laos) Konekham Inthammavong
- (Laos) Kovanh Namthavixay
- (Laos) Lamnao Singto
- (Philippines) Anton del Rosario
- (Philippines) James Younghusband
- (Timor-Leste) Anggisu Barbosa
