= 2008 AFC Challenge Cup qualification =

The qualification phase for the 2008 AFC Challenge Cup saw four teams advance to the finals to join four automatic qualifiers in the final tournament in India. Qualification was held from 2 April to 28 May 2008 in four different venues. Sixteen teams participated in qualification in four groups containing four teams each. The four group winners joined hosts India, North Korea, Myanmar, and Turkmenistan in the final round.

== Seedings ==
1. North Korea
2. Turkmenistan
3. India
4. Myanmar
5. Tajikistan
6. Sri Lanka
7. Nepal
8. Kyrgyzstan
9. Palestine (Withdrew 14 May 2008)
10. Chinese Taipei
11. Bangladesh
12. Brunei
13. Pakistan
14. Cambodia
15. Philippines
16. Afghanistan
17. Bhutan
18. Macau
19. Guam
20. Laos (Withdrew 2 May 2008)

The draw for the qualification groups was made on 18 January 2008 at AFC House in Kuala Lumpur, Malaysia.

== Qualification ==
=== Group A ===
- Matches played in Taipei, Chinese Taipei

Team	Pld	W	D	L	GF	GA	GD	Pts
Sri Lanka	3	2	1	0	14	4	+10	7
Pakistan	3	2	0	1	12	10	+2	6
Chinese Taipei	3	1	1	1	7	5	+2	4
Guam	3	0	0	3	4	18	−14	0

Source: RSSSF
2 April 2008
16:00 UTC+8

Sri Lanka	5–1	Guam
Bandanage 54'; Siyaguna 55', 64'; S. Mohamed 82'; Jayasuriya 90+1'	Report	Mendiola 62'

Chungshan Stadium, Taipei
Attendance: 300
Referee: Valentin Kovalenko (Uzbekistan)
2 April 2008
18:30 UTC+8

Chinese Taipei	1–2	Pakistan
Lo Chih-an 5'	Report	Essa 13'; Masih 34'

Chungshan Stadium, Taipei
Attendance: 800
Referee: Masaaki Toma (Japan)

4 April 2008
16:00 UTC+8

Pakistan	1–7	Sri Lanka
A. Ahmed 17'	Report	Jayasuriya 7', 42', 90+2'; Bandanage 13' (pen.), 82'; Dehiwalage 72', 77'

Chungshan Stadium, Taipei
Attendance: 300
Referee: Valentin Kovalenko (Uzbekistan)
4 April 2008
18:30 UTC+8

Guam	1–4	Chinese Taipei
Pangelinan 17'	Report	Chang Han 20'; Huang Wei-yi 28'; Chen Po-liang 33'; Chiang Shih-lu 44'

Chungshan Stadium, Taipei
Attendance: 850
Referee: Win Cho (Myanmar)

6 April 2008
16:00 UTC+8

Pakistan	9–2	Guam
Anwar 9', 18'; Shah 28'; Qasim 44', 72', 82'; T. Ahmed 62'; Hameed 65' (pen.); Rehman 85'	Report	Pangelinan 74'; I. Ahmed 80' (o.g.)

Chungshan Stadium, Taipei
Attendance: 200
Referee: Kadhum Auda Lazim (Iraq)
6 April 2008
18:30 UTC+8

Sri Lanka	2–2	Chinese Taipei
Chen Po-liang 59' (o.g.); Jayasuriya 86'	Report	Chang Han 28'; Tsai Hsien-tang 74'

Chungshan Stadium, Taipei
Attendance: 900
Referee: Masaaki Toma (Japan)

=== Group B ===
- Matches played in Iloilo City and Barotac Nuevo, Philippines

Team	Pld	W	D	L	GF	GA	GD	Pts
Tajikistan	3	2	1	0	7	1	+6	7
Philippines	3	2	1	0	4	0	+4	7
Bhutan	3	0	1	2	2	7	−5	1
Brunei	3	0	1	2	1	6	−5	1

Source: RSSSF
13 May 2008
15:30 UTC+8

Tajikistan	3–1	Bhutan
Hakimov 27' 88' (pen.); Rabiev 60'	Report	P. Tshering 69'

Barotac Nuevo Plaza Field, Barotac Nuevo
Attendance: 5,000
Referee: Ng Chiu Kok (Hong Kong)

13 May 2008
15:30 UTC+8

Brunei	0–1	Philippines
	Report	Caligdong 28'

Iloilo Sports Complex, Iloilo City
Attendance: 3,500
Referee: Ali Saleem (Maldives)

15 May 2008
15:30 UTC+8

Philippines	0–0	Tajikistan
	Report

Iloilo Sports Complex, Iloilo City
Attendance: 4,500
Referee: Ali Al-Badawi (United Arab Emirates)

15 May 2008
15:30 UTC+8

Bhutan	1–1	Brunei
Dendup 12'	Report	Bin Salleh 76'

Barotac Nuevo Plaza Field, Barotac Nuevo
Attendance: 4,000
Referee: Chaiya Mahapab (Thailand)

17 May 2008
15:30 UTC+8

Philippines	3–0	Bhutan
Gould 41'; P. Younghusband 43'; Rinchen 58' (o.g.)	Report

Barotac Nuevo Plaza Field, Barotac Nuevo
Attendance: 7,000
Referee: Ali Saleem (Maldives)

17 May 2008
15:30 UTC+8

Tajikistan	4–0	Brunei
Rabiev 46', 87'; Mukhidinov 61'; Hakimov 69'	Report

Iloilo Sports Complex, Iloilo City
Attendance: 450
Referee: Ali Al-Badawi (United Arab Emirates)

=== Group C ===
- Matches played in Bishkek, Kyrgyzstan
- Laos withdrew on 2 May.

Team	Pld	W	D	L	GF	GA	GD	Pts
Afghanistan	2	1	1	0	1	0	+1	4
Kyrgyzstan	2	1	0	1	2	2	0	3
Bangladesh	2	0	1	1	1	2	−1	1

Source: RSSSF
5 May 2008
17:30 UTC+6

Bangladesh	0–0	Afghanistan
	Report

Spartak Stadium, Bishkek
Attendance: 3,000
Referee: Khalid Al-Senan (United Arab Emirates)

7 May 2008
17:30 UTC+6

Afghanistan	1–0	Kyrgyzstan
Yamrali 38'	Report

Spartak Stadium, Bishkek
Attendance: 7,000
Referee: Rosdi Shaharul (Malaysia)

9 May 2008
17:30 UTC+6

Kyrgyzstan	2–1	Bangladesh
Kornilov 83'; Sydykov 87'	Report	Ameli 63'

Spartak Stadium, Bishkek
Attendance: 5,000
Referee: Atallah Jatli Al-Enezi (Kuwait)

=== Group D ===
- Matches played in Phnom Penh, Cambodia
- Palestine withdrew on 14 May.

Team	Pld	W	D	L	GF	GA	GD	Pts
Nepal	2	2	0	0	4	2	+2	6
Cambodia	2	1	0	1	3	2	+1	3
Macau	2	0	0	2	3	6	−3	0

Source: RSSSF
24 May 2008
15:00 UTC+7

Nepal	3–2	Macau
S. Rai 43'; J.M. Rai 57', 65'	Report	Che Chi Man 29' (pen.); Chan Kin Seng 59'

National Olympic Stadium, Phnom Penh
Attendance: 2,000
Referee: Vo Minh Tri (Vietnam)

26 May 2008
15:00 UTC+7

Cambodia	0–1	Nepal
	Report	J.M. Rai 44'

National Olympic Stadium, Phnom Penh
Attendance: 3,000
Referee: Mohsen Torky (Iran)

28 May 2008
15:00 UTC+7

Cambodia	3–1	Macau
Sinoun 30', 90+2'; Rithy 67'	Report	Che Chi Man 65'

National Olympic Stadium, Phnom Penh
Attendance: 3,000
Referee: Çarymyrat Gurbanow (Turkmenistan)

== Final tournament ==
The final tournament, consisting of 8 teams, was held from 30 July to 13 August 2008 in India.

=== Qualifiers ===
Qualifiers for the final tournament were:

- India - automatic qualifier
- North Korea - automatic qualifier
- Myanmar - automatic qualifier
- Turkmenistan - automatic qualifier
- Sri Lanka - Group A winner
- Tajikistan - Group B winner
- Afghanistan - Group C winner
- Nepal - Group D winner

== Goalscorers ==
5 goals

- (Sri Lanka) Kasun Jayasuriya

3 goals

- (Nepal) Ju Manu Rai
- (Pakistan) Muhammad Qasim
- (Sri Lanka) Channa Ediri Bandanage
- (Tajikistan) Numonjon Hakimov
- (Tajikistan) Yusuf Rabiev

2 goals

- (Cambodia) Nuth Sinoun
- (Chinese Taipei) Chang Han
- (Guam) Zachary Pangelinan
- (Macau) Che Chi Man
- (Pakistan) Jamshed Anwar
- (Sri Lanka) Nimal Dehiwalage
- (Sri Lanka) Chathura Maduranga Siyaguna

1 goal

- (Afghanistan) Ata Yamrali
- (Bangladesh) Mohamed Hasan Ameli
- (Bhutan) Nawang Dendup
- (Bhutan) Passang Tshering
- (Brunei) Khayrun Bin Salleh
- (Cambodia) Chan Rithy
- (Chinese Taipei) Chen Po-liang
- (Chinese Taipei) Chiang Shih-lu
- (Chinese Taipei) Huang Wei-yi
- (Chinese Taipei) Lo Chih-an
- (Chinese Taipei) Tsai Hsien-tang
- (Guam) Christopher Mendiola
- (Kyrgyzstan) Roman Kornilov
- (Kyrgyzstan) Ruslan Sydykov
- (Macau) Chan Kin Seng
- (Nepal) Sandip Rai

1 goal

- (Pakistan) Adnan Ahmed
- (Pakistan) Tanveer Ahmed
- (Pakistan) Mohammad Essa
- (Pakistan) Zahid Hameed
- (Pakistan) Michael Masih
- (Pakistan) Abdul Rehman
- (Pakistan) Farooq Shah
- (Philippines) Emelio Caligdong
- (Philippines) Chad Gould
- (Philippines) Phil Younghusband
- (Sri Lanka) Sabras Mohamed
- (Tajikistan) Dzhomikhon Mukhidinov

Own goal

- (Bhutan) Pema Rinchen (playing against Philippines)
- (Chinese Taipei) Chen Po-liang (playing against Sri Lanka)
- (Pakistan) Iltaf Ahmed (playing against Guam)
