= Batmönkhiin Erkhembayar =

Mongolian footballer

Personal information
- Full name: Batmönkhiin Erkhembayar; Батмөнхийн Эрхэмбаяр
- Date of birth: 28 July 1991 (age 35)
- Place of birth: Ulaanbaatar, Mongolia
- Position: Defender

Team information
- Current team: Erchim

Senior career*
Years	Team	Apps	(Gls)
2012–	Erchim		

International career
2013–	Mongolia	7	(1)
- * Club domestic league appearances and goals

Batmönkhiin Erkhembayar (Mongolian: Батмөнхийн Эрхэмбаяр) is a Mongolian international footballer. He made his first appearance for the Mongolia national football team in 2013.

== International career ==
=== International goals ===
Scores and results list Mongolia's goal tally first.

Goal	Date	Venue	Opponent	Score	Result	Competition
1.	12 March 2015	National Stadium, Dili, East Timor	Timor-Leste	1–4	1–4	2018 FIFA World Cup qualification
