= 2018 FIFA World Cup qualification – AFC first round =

International football competition

Tournament details
- Dates: 12-17 March 2015
- Teams: 12 (from 1 confederation)

Tournament statistics
- Matches played: 12
- Goals scored: 24 (2 per match)
- Attendance: 89,973 (7,498 per match)
- Top scorer(s): (Bhutan) Chencho Gyeltshen (Cambodia) Chan Vathanaka (India) Sunil Chhetri (Timor-Leste) Chiquito do Carmo (Note: This player scored in one of the matches between Timor-Leste and Mongolia that was subsequently forfeited, however FIFA continued to count the goalscorers from those matches in its statistics.) (2 goals each)

The first round of AFC matches for 2018 FIFA World Cup qualification (and 2019 AFC Asian Cup qualification) was played from 12 to 23 March 2015.

== Format ==
A total of twelve teams (teams ranked 35–46 in the AFC entrant list) played home-and-away over two legs. The six winners advanced to the second round.

== Seeding ==
The draw for the first round was held on 10 February 2015, 15:30 MST (UTC+8), at the AFC House in Kuala Lumpur, Malaysia.

The seeding was based on the FIFA World Rankings of January 2015 (shown in parentheses below). The 12 teams were seeded into two pots:

- Pot A contained the teams ranked 1–6 (i.e., 35–40 in the AFC entrant list).
- Pot B contained the teams ranked 7–12 (i.e., 41–46 in the AFC entrant list).

Each tie contained a team from Pot A and a team from Pot B, with the team from Pot A hosting the first leg.

Note: Bolded teams qualified for the second round.

Pot A	Pot B
1. **India** (171); 2. Sri Lanka (172); 3. **Yemen** (176); 4. **Cambodia** (179); 5. **Chinese Taipei** (182); 6. **Timor-Leste** (185)	7. Nepal (186); 8. Macau (186); 9. Pakistan (188); 10. Mongolia (194); 11. Brunei (198); 12. **Bhutan** (209)

== Summary ==
Team 1	Agg.	Team 2	1st leg	2nd leg
**India**	2–0	Nepal	2–0	0–0
**Yemen**	3–1	Pakistan	3–1	0–0
**Timor-Leste**	5–1 (Note: On 12 December 2017, Timor-Leste were ordered by the AFC to forfeit both matches against Mongolia due to the use of falsified documents for their players.)	Mongolia	4–1	1–0
**Cambodia**	4–1	Macau	3–0	1–1
**Chinese Taipei**	2–1	Brunei	0–1	2–0
Sri Lanka	1–3	**Bhutan**	0–1	1–2

== Matches ==
12 March 2015
19:00 UTC+5:30

India	2–0	Nepal
Chhetri 53', 70'	Report (FIFA); Report (AFC)

Indira Gandhi Athletic Stadium, Guwahati
Attendance: 11,200
Referee: Aziz Asimov (Uzbekistan)
17 March 2015
15:30 UTC+5:45

Nepal	0–0	India
	Report (FIFA); Report (AFC)

Dasarath Rangasala Stadium, Kathmandu
Attendance: 10,500
Referee: Khamis Al-Marri (Qatar)

India won 2–0 on aggregate and advanced to the second round.

12 March 2015
18:30 UTC+3

Yemen	3–1	Pakistan
Al-Matari 3'; Boqshan 56'; Al-Sasi 69'	Report (FIFA); Report (AFC)	Bashir 67' (pen.)

Grand Hamad Stadium, Doha (Qatar) (Note: Yemen played their home match in Qatar due to security concerns from the 2014–15 Yemeni coup d'état.)
Attendance: 300
Referee: Mohammad Abu Loum (Jordan)
23 March 2015 (Note: Pakistan was originally scheduled to play their home match on 17 March 2015 (15:00 UTC+5) at Punjab Stadium, Lahore, but it was postponed due to safety and security reasons after the Lahore church bombings and civil unrest in the city. The match was subsequently rescheduled to be played in Bahrain.)
18:30 UTC+3

Pakistan	0–0	Yemen
	Report (FIFA); Report (AFC)

Khalifa Sports City Stadium, Isa Town (Bahrain)
Attendance: 2,200
Referee: Ali Sabah Adday Al-Qaysi (Iraq)

Yemen won 3–1 on aggregate and advanced to the second round.

12 March 2015
16:00 UTC+9

Timor-Leste	4–1 Forfeited (Note: On 12 December 2017, Timor-Leste were ordered by the AFC to forfeit both matches against Mongolia due to the use of falsified documents for their players.)	Mongolia
Quito 4', 7'; R. Silva 84'; Neto 85'	Report (FIFA); Report (AFC)	Batmönkhiin 87'

National Stadium, Dili
Attendance: 9,000
Referee: Sivakorn Pu-Udom (Thailand)
17 March 2015
16:00 UTC+8

Mongolia	0–1 Forfeited	Timor-Leste
	Report (FIFA); Report (AFC)	Patrick 9'

MFF Football Centre, Ulaanbaatar
Attendance: 5,000
Referee: Wang Di (China)

Timor-Leste won the first leg 4–1 and the second leg 1–0, thus winning 5–1 on aggregate and advancing to the Second round.

12 March 2015
16:00 UTC+7

Cambodia	3–0	Macau
Vathanaka 63', 80'; Laboravy 90+4'	Report (FIFA); Report (AFC)

Army Stadium, Phnom Penh
Attendance: 8,000
Referee: Ho Wai Sing (Hong Kong)
17 March 2015
20:00 UTC+8

Macau	1–1	Cambodia
Leong Ka Hang 52' (pen.)	Report (FIFA); Report (AFC)	Bin 29'

Estádio Campo Desportivo, Macau
Attendance: 1,000
Referee: Yaqoob Abdul Baki (Oman)

Cambodia won 4–1 on aggregate and advanced to the second round.

12 March 2015
19:00 UTC+8

Chinese Taipei	0–1	Brunei
	Report (FIFA); Report (AFC)	Adi 36'

National Stadium, Kaohsiung
Attendance: 6,273
Referee: Rowan Arumughan (India)
17 March 2015
20:15 UTC+8

Brunei	0–2	Chinese Taipei
	Report (FIFA); Report (AFC)	Wang Rui 37'; Chu En-le 52'

Sultan Hassanal Bolkiah Stadium, Bandar Seri Begawan
Attendance: 18,000
Referee: Turki Al-Khudhayr (Saudi Arabia)

Chinese Taipei won 2–1 on aggregate and advanced to the second round.

12 March 2015
15:00 UTC+5:30

Sri Lanka	0–1	Bhutan
	Report (FIFA); Report (AFC)	T. Dorji 82'

Sugathadasa Stadium, Colombo
Attendance: 3,500
Referee: Fu Ming (China)
17 March 2015
16:00 UTC+6

Bhutan	2–1	Sri Lanka
C. Gyeltshen 6', 90'	Report (FIFA); Report (AFC)	Madushan 34'

Changlimithang Stadium, Thimphu
Attendance: 15,000
Referee: Marai Al-Awaji (Saudi Arabia)

Bhutan won 3–1 on aggregate and advanced to the second round.

== Goalscorers ==
There were 24 goals scored in 12 matches, for an average of 2 goals per match.

2 goals

- (Bhutan) Chencho Gyeltshen
- (Cambodia) Chan Vathanaka
- (India) Sunil Chhetri
- (Timor-Leste) Chiquito do Carmo

1 goal

- (Bhutan) Tshering Dorji
- (Brunei) Adi Said
- (Cambodia) Khoun Laboravy
- (Cambodia) Thierry Bin
- (Chinese Taipei) Chu En-le
- (Chinese Taipei) Wang Rui
- (Macau) Leong Ka Hang
- (Mongolia) Batmönkhiin Erkhembayar
- (Pakistan) Hassan Bashir
- (Sri Lanka) Subash Madushan
- (Timor-Leste) Patrick Fabiano
- (Timor-Leste) Jairo Neto
- (Timor-Leste) Rodrigo Silva
- (Yemen) Abdulwasea Al-Matari
- (Yemen) Ala Al-Sasi
- (Yemen) Mohammed Boqshan
