= Mohammed Monwar Hossain =

Bangladeshi footballer

Monwar Hossain
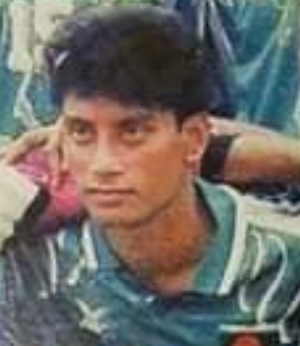
- Monwar with Bangladesh at the 1999 SA Games

Personal information
- Full name: Mohammed Monwar Hossain
- Date of birth: 30 August 1979 (age 47)
- Place of birth: Naogaon, Bangladesh
- Height: 1.70 m (5 ft 7 in)
- Positions: Right winger; attacking midfielder

Youth career
- BKSP

Senior career*
Years	Team	Apps	(Gls)
1995–1997	Fakirerpool YMC		
1998–2000	Badda Jagoroni		
2001–2003	Mohammedan SC		
2003–2007	Brothers Union		
2008–2009	Sheikh Russel KC		
2009–2011	Brothers Union		

International career
1998	Bangladesh U16		
1998–2000	Bangladesh U19		
2002–2004	Bangladesh U23		
1998–2006	Bangladesh		

Managerial career
- 2016–2017: Arambagh KS
Medal record
Representing Bangladesh
Men's football
South Asian Games
Gold medal – first place	1999 Kathmandu
SAFF Championship
Runner-up	1999 India
Winner	2003 Bangladesh
- * Club domestic league appearances and goals

Mohammed Monwar Hossain (Bengali: মোহাম্মদ মনোয়ার হোসেন; born 30 August 1979) is a Bangladeshi football coach and former player. He represented the Bangladesh national team from 1998 to 2006.

== Club career ==
A product of BKSP he began his club career with Fakirerpool YMC in 1995.

== International career ==
Monwar played for the Bangladesh national team from 1998 to 2006. He made it to the regular eleven of the national team without playing any age-based international match, while still only being 19. He later served as the captain of U-16, U-19 and also the U-23 team during the 2004 South Asian Games, in Pakistan.

In senior level, Monwar won the 1999 South Asian Games and the 2003 SAFF Championship. He was a member of the runner-up Bangladesh team in the 1999 SAFF Championship. On 30 March 2003, Manowar scored his first and only senior international goal, during a 2–2 draw with Hong Kong, at the 2004 AFC Asian Cup qualifiers. Monwar last played for Bangladesh during a 6–1 defeat to Tajikistan, on 11 April 2006.

== Coaching career ==
Monwar completed the AFC 'C' License Certificate Course in 2012, and served as the football head coach of Pledge Harbor International School and Sports Academy. In 2015, he took charge of Arambagh Krira Sangha. It was under him that the club finished runners-up in the 2015–16 Bangladesh Championship League, and earned promotion to the Bangladesh Premier League. He received the 'Best Coach Award' from Arambagh Club and 'Best Young Promising Coach of the Year Award' from Bangladesh Football Federation. Monwar also worked as a coach in Special Olympics Bangladesh from August 2014. Additionally, from January 2014, he began working as a brand ambassador for the charity for Autism and Disabled children under the National Center for Special Education.

== International goals ==
=== Bangladesh national team ===
Scores and results list Bangladesh's goal tally first.

No.	Date	Venue	Opponent	Score	Result	Competition
1.	27 April 2001	Mirpur Stadium, Dhaka, Bangladesh	Bhutan	3–0	3–1	Friendly
2.	11 April 2006	Mong Kok Stadium, Kowloon, Hong Kong	Hong Kong	2–2	2–2	2004 AFC Asian Cup qualification

== Honours ==
Mohammedan

- Dhaka Premier Division League: 2002
- Federation Cup: 2008
- National League: 2001–02

Brothers Union

- Dhaka Premier Division League: 2003–04, 2005
- Bordoloi Trophy: 2004
- Federation Cup: 2005

Bangladesh

- SAFF Championship: 2003
- South Asian Games Gold medal: 1999
