= Nuth Sinoun =

Cambodian footballer

Personal information
- Date of birth: 10 October 1985 (age 41)
- Place of birth: Phnom Penh, Cambodia
- Height: 1.75 m (5 ft 9 in)
- Position: Striker

Youth career
- 2004–2006: Royal Navy

Senior career*
Years	Team	Apps	(Gls)
2007–2009	Nagacorp		
2009–2010	Preah Khan Reach		
2010–2011	Build Bright University		
2012	Chhlam Samuth		
2012–2013	National Police Commissary		
2013	Asia Europe University		
2014–2015	TriAsia Phnom Penh		
2015–2016	Western Phnom Penh		
2016–2017	National Police Commissary		
2017–2018	Visakha		

International career
2004–2010	Cambodia	15	(3)
- * Club domestic league appearances and goals

Sinoun Nuth (born 10 October 1985) is a Cambodian footballer who plays for home town club Visakha in Cambodian Second League. He was called to Cambodia national team at 2010 AFF Suzuki Cup qualification.

== Career statistics ==
#	Date	Venue	Opponent	Score	Result	Competition
1.	28 May 2008	Phnom Penh, Cambodia	Macau	3–1	Won	2008 AFC Challenge Cup qualification
2.	28 May 2008	Phnom Penh, Cambodia	Macau	3–1	Won	2008 AFC Challenge Cup qualification
3.	24 October 2010	Vientiane, Laos	Timor-Leste	4–2	Won	2010 AFF Suzuki Cup qualification
