= Edison Figurado =

Sri Lankan footballer

James Edison Figurado
Personal information
- Full name: Victor Ratnasingham James Edison Figurado
- Date of birth: 25 July 1990 (age 36)
- Place of birth: Mannar, Sri Lanka
- Position: Midfielder

Team information
- Current team: Solid SC

Senior career*
Years	Team	Apps	(Gls)
- Solid SC

International career
2015–	Sri Lanka	7	(1)
- * Club domestic league appearances and goals

James Edison Figurado (born 25 July 1990) is a Sri Lankan professional footballer who plays as a midfielder for Solid SC and the Sri Lanka national football team.

Having been named for the Sri Lanka squads for the 2015 SAFF Championship and the Bangabandhu Gold Cup, he scored his first international goal in a 4-2 win to Bangladesh in the Bangabandhu Gold Cup.

Scored a scintillating goal straight from taking a corner kick to help Solid SC beat Navy SC 2-1 in the 2014–15 Sri Lanka Football Premier League.

== International career ==
=== International goals ===
Scores and results list Sri Lanka's goal tally first.

Goal	Date	Venue	Opponent	Score	Result	Competition
1.	8 January 2016	Shamsul Huda Stadium, Jessore, Bangladesh	Bangladesh	1–1	2–4	Friendly
