= Chathuranga Sanjeewa =

Sri Lankan footballer

Personal information
- Date of birth: 6 July 1991 (age 35)
- Place of birth: Sri Lanka
- Position: Midfielder

Team information
- Current team: Navy

Senior career*
Years	Team	Apps	(Gls)
2011–	Navy		

International career^{‡}
2013–2016	Sri Lanka	22	(1)
- * Club domestic league appearances and goals ‡ National team caps and goals as of 5 July 2026

Chathuranga Sanjeewa is a Sri Lankan professional footballer who plays as a midfielder for Navy in the Sri Lanka Football Premier League.

== International career ==
=== International goals ===
Scores and results list Sri Lanka's goal tally first.

Goal	Date	Venue	Opponent	Score	Result	Competition
1.	8 January 2016	Shamsul Huda Stadium, Jessore, Bangladesh	Bangladesh	2–3	2–4	Friendly
