= Barotac Nuevo Plaza Field =

Football field in Iloilo, Philippines

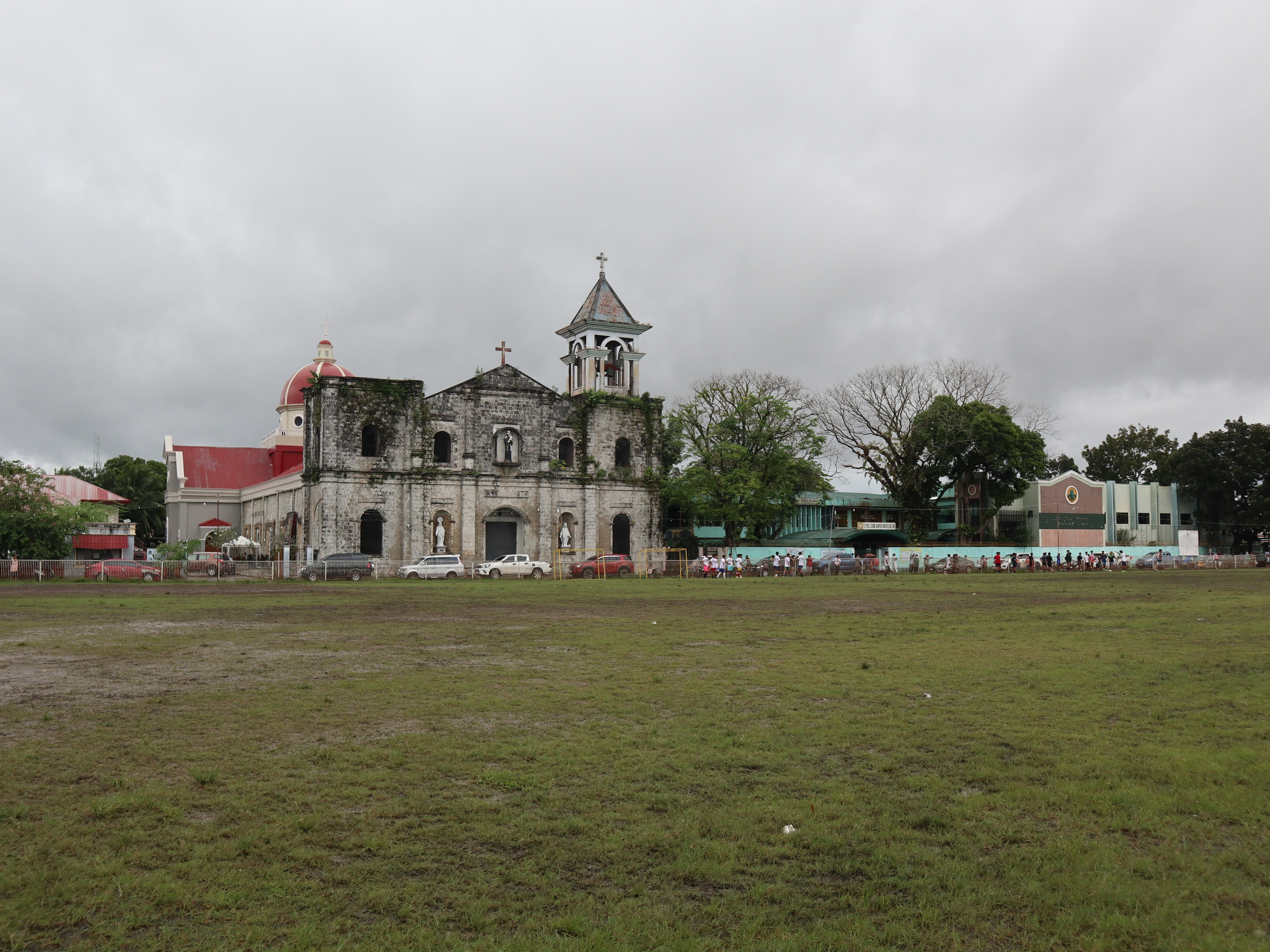
- Interactive map of Barotac Nuevo Plaza Field
- Location: Barotac Nuevo, Iloilo, Philippines
- Coordinates: 10.8949°N 122.7038°E
- Owner: Barotac Nuevo Municipal Government
- Surface: Grass

The Barotac Nuevo Plaza Field is a football venue in Barotac Nuevo, Iloilo. The field is located at the town plaza. The football field was one of the two venues of the 2008 AFC Challenge Cup qualifiers held in the Philippines along with the Iloilo Sports Complex.

== See also ==
- Iloilo Sports Complex
