= Tith Dina =

Cambodian footballer

Tith Dina ទិត្យ ឌីណា
Personal information
- Full name: Tith Dina
- Date of birth: June 5, 1993 (age 33)
- Place of birth: Phnom Penh, Cambodia
- Position: Attacking midfielder

Senior career*
Years	Team	Apps	(Gls)
2008–2018	National Police Commissary		
2018–2022	Visakha		
2022	Prey Veng		
2023–2024	Boeung Ket	0	(0)

International career
2013–2015	Cambodia U-23		
2011–2018	Cambodia	33	(2)
- * Club domestic league appearances and goals

Tith Dina (Khmer: ទិត្យ ឌីណា born 5 June 1993) is a Cambodian footballer who plays as an attacking midfielder. He used to be Cambodia national football team member. He made his only appearance for the 2014 World Cup Qualifying match against Laos on 3 July 2011.

== Career statistics ==
=== International goals ===
On 28 July 2016, he scored the winning goal in a 2–1 victory over Singapore in front of a sell-out crowd at the Olympic Stadium in Phnom Penh. At the 45+1 minutes he found himself at the end of a brilliant pass from Chan Vathanaka and netted the game's second goal to record Cambodia's first win over Singapore since 1972.

==== Senior team ====
Scores and results list Cambodia goal tally first.

#	Date	Venue	Opponent	Score	Result	Competition
1.	28 July 2016	Olympic Stadium, Phnom Penh. Cambodia	Singapore	2–1	2–1	Friendly Match
2.	21 October 2016	Olympic Stadium, Phnom Penh, Cambodia	Timor-Leste	1–0	3–2	2016 AFF Championship qualification
