= Shamsul Huda Stadium =

Sports venue in Bangladesh

Coordinates: 23°09′50.42″N 89°12′11.39″E

- Interactive map of Shamsul Huda Stadium
- Location: Jessore (city), Bangladesh
- Owner: National Sports Council
- Capacity: 12,000
- Surface: Grass

Shamsul Huda Stadium, also known as Jessore Stadium, is a football and cricket stadium located near municipality park in the Jessore city, Bangladesh. It has become a venue of first class and list A cricket since 2000.

== History ==
The stadium most notably hosted the Pakistan National Football Championship from 9 February to 3 March 1968.

On 24 March 2014, the stadium, which has a capacity of 12,000 was filled with more than 30,000 viewers during a friendly match against Sri Lanka, where the hosts won 1–0. It also hosted games during the 2016 Bangabandhu Cup.

== International football ==
Date	Competition	Team	Result	Team	Attendance
24 October 2014	International friendly	Bangladesh	1–0	Sri Lanka	30,000
8 January 2016	2016 Bangabandhu Cup	Bangladesh	4–2	Sri Lanka	12,000
9 January 2016	2016 Bangabandhu Cup	Nepal	0–0	(Malaysia) Felda United	6,000
10 January 2016	2016 Bangabandhu Cup	Bangladesh U23	1–1	Bahrain U21	11,000
11 January 2016	2016 Bangabandhu Cup	Maldives	3–2	Cambodia	10,000

== Cricket ==
From 2000 to 2011, this stadium served as one of the home venues for Khulna Division. During this period, the ground hosted a total of 19 First-class and 14 List A matches.

== See also ==
- Stadiums in Bangladesh
- Tangail Stadium
- List of football stadiums in Bangladesh
- List of cricket grounds in Bangladesh
