= 2007 Daegu FC season =

Daegu F.C.
2007 season
- Chairmen: Kim Bum-il (Mayor)
- Manager: Byun Byung-Joo
- K-League: 12th
- FA Cup: Round of 16
- K-League Cup: Group A 3rd
Home colours	Away colours

The 2007 season was Daegu F.C.'s 5th season in South Korea's K-League.

== Season summary ==
For 2007, Kim Hyun-Soo, an experienced defender who had joined the club the previous season, was appointed captain. As well as the regular bunch of draftees from universities around South Korea, Daegu brought in three Brazilians who would play significant roles in the season; Selmir, Luizinho and Eninho. An Argentinean, Maxi, who had played for Spanish La Liga club Racing de Santander, also joined the club but was released mid-season without playing a game.

The K-League revamped its format, with the season now simply consisting of a conventional league, with the top six teams qualifying to the championship phase. This didn't help Daegu much, and after their mid-table finishes of the previous two seasons, their performance slipped, and the club placed 12th, winning six games. However, one notable win at home for the club was the 3–1 victory over Ulsan Hyundai Horang-i. Ulsan represented a major scalp that year, as they would win the League Cup in 2007, as well as eventually finishing third in the K-League. Daegu also secured a 1–0 victory over FC Seoul in their last match of the regular season. Luizinho played in 23 of the 26 regular season games, scoring 11 goals. Lee Keun-Ho finished as the top scoring Korean, in joint 7th with 8 goals, Eninho was just behind with 7 goals.

Daegu failed to get out of the group stage in the 2007 Samsung Hauzen Cup. However, Luizinho did finish as top scorer in the competition, with seven goals from just nine games. The club achieved a similar level of performance in the FA Cup, where Daegu lost to Incheon United in the round of 16.

== Squad ==
Note: Flags indicate national team as defined under FIFA eligibility rules; some limited exceptions apply. Players may hold more than one non-FIFA nationality.

No.	Pos.	Nation	Player
1	GK	KOR	Kim Young-Moo
2	MF	KOR	Na Hee-Keun
3	DF	KOR	Lee Sung-Hwan
4	DF	KOR	Cho Hong-Kyu
5	DF	KOR	Hwang Sun-Pil
6	MF	KOR	Park Jung-Sik
7	FW	BRA	Selmir
8	MF	KOR	Ha Dae-Sung
9	MF	KOR	Moon Joo-Won
10	FW	KOR	Jang Nam-Seok
11	FW	BRA	Luizinho
12	FW	KOR	Jin Kyung-Sun
14	MF	KOR	Lee Tae-Woo
15	DF	KOR	Kim Hyun-Soo (captain)
16	FW	KOR	Hwang Yeon-Seok
18	MF	KOR	Lim Hyun-Woo
19	DF	KOR	Jung Ho-Jin

No.	Pos.	Nation	Player
20	FW	BRA	Eninho
21	GK	KOR	Baek Min-Cheol
22	FW	KOR	Lee Keun-Ho
23	DF	KOR	Yoon Yeo-San
24	DF	KOR	Park Jong-Jin
25	MF	KOR	Choi Jong-Hyuk
26	MF	KOR	Kim Jae-hong
27	DF	KOR	Lee Mun-Sun
28	DF	KOR	Kim Ju-Hwan
29	MF	KOR	Song Jeong-Woo
30	MF	KOR	Ko Jung-Bin
31	GK	KOR	Kim Myung-Gwang
32	MF	KOR	Park Yoon-Hwa
33	MF	KOR	Lee Byung-Keun
34	MF	KOR	Lee Sang-Seok
41	GK	KOR	Jung Ki-Dong

== Players In/Out ==
=== In ===
1	GK	KOR	Kim Young-moo (drafted from Soongsil University)
3	DF	KOR	Lee Sung-hwan (drafted from Konkuk University)
19	DF	KOR	Jung Ho-jin (drafted from Dong-eui University)
25	MF	KOR	Choi Jong-hyuk (drafted from Honnam University)
26	MF	KOR	Kim Jae-hong (drafted from Soongsil University)
31	GK	KOR	Kim Myung-gwang (drafted from Daegu University)
34	MF	KOR	Lee Sang-seok (drafted from Korea University)
7	FW	BRA	Selmir (from Chunnam Dragons)
11	FW	BRA	Luizinho (from (Brazil) Santos FC)
22	FW	KOR	Lee Keun-ho (from Incheon United)
32	MF	KOR	Park Yoon-hwa (from FC Seoul)
—	FW	ARG	Maxi (from (Venezuela) Estudiantes de Mérida)
20	FW	BRA	Eninho (from (Brazil) Coruripe)

=== Out ===
1	GK	KOR	Kim Tae-Jin (released)
2	DF	KOR	Lee Mun-sun (released)
23	GK	KOR	Kim Ji-Woon (released)
25	MF	KOR	Hwang Geum-sung (released)
31	DF	KOR	Kim Jong-bok (released)
34	MF	KOR	Cho Yong-ki (released)
35	MF	KOR	Oh Ju-Po (retired)
6	DF	KOR	Choi Sung-Hwan (to Suwon Samsung Bluewings)
12	MF	KOR	Lee Sang-Il (to Chunnam Dragons)
14	MF	KOR	Yoon Ju-Il (to Incheon United)
28	MF	KOR	Yoon Ho (end of contract)
30	MF	KOR	Oh Jang-eun (to Ulsan Hyundai Horang-i)
—	FW	ARG	Maxi (Released)

== Statistics ==
No.	Nat.	Pos.	Player	Total		K-League		Korean FA Cup		Hauzen Cup	
No.	Nat.	Pos.	Player	Apps	Goals	Apps	Goals	Apps	Goals	Apps	Goals
1	GK	(South Korea) KOR	Kim Young-moo	3	-11	3	-11	0	0	0	0
2	MF	(South Korea) KOR	Na Hee-keun	2	0	1	0	1	0	0	0
3	DF	(South Korea) KOR	Lee Sung-hwan	0	0	0	0	0	0	0	0
4	DF	(South Korea) KOR	Cho Hong-kyu	27	0	18	0	0	0	9	0
5	DF	(South Korea) KOR	Hwang Sun-pil	13	2	13	2	0	0	0	0
6	MF	(South Korea) KOR	Park Jung-sik	20	1	15	1	2	0	3	0
7	FW	(Brazil) BRA	Selmir	19	3	13	3	1	0	5	0
8	MF	(South Korea) KOR	Ha Dae-sung	27	2	17	1	2	0	8	1
9	MF	(South Korea) KOR	Moon Joo-won	20	1	12	1	2	0	6	0
10	FW	(South Korea) KOR	Jang Nam-seok	16	2	12	2	0	0	4	0
11	FW	(Brazil) BRA	Luizinho	34	19	23	11	2	1	9	7
12	MF	(South Korea) KOR	Jin Kyung-sun	29	0	21	0	2	0	6	0
14	MF	(South Korea) KOR	Lee Tae-woo	3	0	2	0	0	0	1	0
15	DF	(South Korea) KOR	Kim Hyun-Soo	30	1	18	0	2	0	10	1
16	FW	(South Korea) KOR	Hwang Yeon-seok	21	0	12	0	1	0	8	0
18	MF	(South Korea) KOR	Lim Hyun-woo	20	0	13	0	1	0	6	0
19	DF	(South Korea) KOR	Jung Ho-jin	1	0	1	0	0	0	0	0
20	FW	(Brazil) BRA	Eninho	30	6	20	3	2	2	8	1
21	GK	(South Korea) KOR	Baek Min-cheol	35	-55	23	-35	2	-4	10	-16
22	FW	(South Korea) KOR	Lee Keun-ho	29	10	20	8	2	0	7	2
23	DF	(South Korea) KOR	Yoon Yeo-san	19	0	15	0	1	0	3	0
24	DF	(South Korea) KOR	Park Jong-Jin	30	1	18	1	2	0	10	0
25	MF	(South Korea) KOR	Choi Jong-hyuk	18	0	12	0	1	0	5	0
26	MF	(South Korea) KOR	Kim Jae-hong	1	0	1	0	0	0	0	0
27	DF	(South Korea) KOR	Lee Mun-sun	0	0	0	0	0	0	0	0
28	DF	(South Korea) KOR	Kim Ju-Hwan	23	1	13	0	1	0	9	1
29	MF	(South Korea) KOR	Song Jeong-woo	9	0	8	0	1	0	0	0
30	MF	(South Korea) KOR	Ko Jung-bin	0	0	0	0	0	0	0	0
31	GK	(South Korea) KOR	Kim Myung-gwang	0	0	0	0	0	0	0	0
32	MF	(South Korea) KOR	Park Yoon-hwa	28	0	22	0	0	0	6	0
33	MF	(South Korea) KOR	Lee Byung-keun	5	1	3	1	0	0	2	0
34	MF	(South Korea) KOR	Lee Sang-seok	1	0	1	0	0	0	0	0
41	GK	(South Korea) KOR	Jung Ki-dong	0	0	0	0	0	0	0	0

== K-League ==
=== Standings ===
Pos	Team	Pld	W	D	L	GF	GA	GD	Pts
11	Jeju United	26	8	6	12	27	35	−8	30
12	Daegu FC	26	6	6	14	35	46	−11	24
13	Busan IPark	26	4	8	14	20	39	−19	20

Source: RSSSF

Pos	Team	Qualification
1	Pohang Steelers (C)	Qualification for the Champions League
2	Seongnam Ilhwa Chunma	
3	Suwon Samsung Bluewings	
4	Ulsan Hyundai Horang-i	
5	Gyeongnam FC	
6	Daejeon Citizen	

Source: RSSSF
(C) Champions

== Korean FA Cup ==
=== Matches ===
Round	Date	Opponents	H / A	Score	Scorers	Ground
Round of 32	12 June 2007	Gangneung City FC	A	1 - 1^{(6 PK 7)}	Eninho 43'	Gangneung Stadium
Round of 16	20 August 2007	Incheon United	H	2 - 3	Luizinho 20', Eninho 87'	Blue Arc

== Samsung Hauzen Cup ==
=== Standings ===
Pos	Team	Pld	W	D	L	GF	GA	GD	Pts
2	Incheon United	10	6	1	3	20	15	+5	19
3	Daegu FC	10	4	1	5	13	16	−3	13
4	Jeonbuk Hyundai Motors	10	3	3	4	9	10	−1	12

Source: RSSSF

== See also ==
- Daegu FC
