= 2006 Daegu FC season =

Daegu F.C.
2006 season
- Chairmen: Kim Bum-il (Mayor)
- Manager: Park Jong-Hwan
- K-League: 7th
- FA Cup: Quarter final
- K-League Cup: 13th
| Home colours | Away colours |

The 2006 season was Daegu F.C.'s 4th season in South Korea's K-League.

== Season summary ==
Lee Sang-il would be made captain for 2006, which would be his final year with the club before moving to the Chunnam Dragons. As a foundation player, Lee had been with the club since 2003, and would go on to make 98 appearances in total (all competitions) for Daegu FC by the conclusion of the 2006 season. Key new players for the club would include Brazilians Dinei and Eduardo Marques, as well as Korean draftee Jang Nam-Seok who would play as a forward for the club. Another important recruit for the club was goalkeeper Baek Min-cheol, who was getting little game time with FC Seoul.

Prior to the start of the K-League season, Daegu participated in the 2006 edition of the Tongyeong Cup. The Tongyeong Cup is a four team invitational tournament held in Tongyeong, South Korea. As well as Daegu and fellow K-League club Incheon United, A-League side Queensland Roar and Beijing Guo'an were also part of the tournament. After beating both Incheon and Beijing, Daegu drew 0–0 with Queensland, winning the Tongyeong Cup and thus the first piece of silverware for Daegu's trophy cabinet.

Unfortunately, Daegu's late 2005 season and 2006 Tongyeong Cup form did not continue into the 2006 K-League season proper, and the club again had a disappointing first stage. Winning only two games, they were placed in a share of eleventh, alongside Gwangju and debutant club Gyeongnam FC. However, as in 2005, the club's performance improved for the second stage, winning six games, and losing four, with three draws. This saw the club place fourth in the second stage and seventh overall. In contrast to the previous two seasons, offensively, the club struggled with goals being spread across a number of players, with no single standout player.

In between the first and second stages of the K-League season, the club participated in the Samsung Hauzen Cup. The club's performances in this competition matched that of their performance in the first stage of the K-League, and Daegu only placed 13th out of 14 teams. A lack of penetration did not help, and only Jang Nam-Seok, in his first season for the club, featured in the leading goal scorers table. Jang was the top scorer in the FA Cup, with 3 goals (including two in a 6-0 demolition of Chungang University, helping the club to the quarterfinals. However, they lost (again) to the Chunnam Dragons.

Following completion of the 2006 season, Park Jong-Hwan stepped down as manager after four years with the club. On 1 December 2006, Byun Byung-Joo was appointed manager. A former representative player for the Republic of Korea, Byun had no previous K-League management experience prior to his appointment as Daegu FC's manager.

In other events during 2006:

- On 1 May, Choi Jong-Joon was elected to the position of representative director.
- On 20 September, Kim Bum-Il (Daegu mayor) was elected to the position of chairman.
- On 9 November, a supplier's sponsorship agreement was reached with Lotto.

== Squad ==
Note: Flags indicate national team as defined under FIFA eligibility rules; some limited exceptions apply. Players may hold more than one non-FIFA nationality.

| No. | Pos. | Nation | Player |
|---|---|---|---|
| 1 | GK | KOR | Kim Tae-Jin |
| 2 | DF | KOR | Lee Mun-Sun |
| 3 | DF | KOR | Cho Hong-Kyu |
| 4 | DF | KOR | Park Jung-Sik |
| 5 | DF | KOR | Hwang Sun-Pil |
| 6 | DF | KOR | Choi Sung-Hwan |
| 8 | MF | KOR | Ha Dae-Sung |
| 9 | FW | KOR | Jang Nam-Seok |
| 10 | FW | BRA | Eduardo Marques |
| 11 | FW | BRA | Dinel |
| 12 | MF | KOR | Lee Sang-Il (captain) |
| 13 | MF | KOR | Moon Joo-Won |
| 14 | MF | KOR | Yoon Ju-Il |
| 15 | DF | KOR | Kim Hyun-Soo |
| 16 | FW | KOR | Hwang Yeon-Seok |
| 17 | MF | KOR | Lee Hyeon-Woo |
| 18 | MF | KOR | Na Hee-Keun |

| No. | Pos. | Nation | Player |
|---|---|---|---|
| 20 | MF | KOR | Lee Byung-Keun |
| 21 | GK | KOR | Baek Min-Cheol |
| 22 | MF | KOR | Lee Tae-woo |
| 23 | GK | KOR | Kim Ji-Woon |
| 24 | DF | KOR | Park Jong-Jin |
| 25 | MF | KOR | Hwang Geum-Sung |
| 26 | MF | KOR | Jin Kyung-Sun |
| 27 | DF | KOR | Yoon Yeo-San |
| 28 | MF | KOR | Yoon Ho |
| 29 | DF | KOR | Kim Ju-Hwan |
| 30 | MF | KOR | Oh Jang-eun |
| 31 | DF | KOR | Kim Jong-bok |
| 32 | MF | KOR | Song Jeong-woo |
| 34 | MF | KOR | Cho Yong-Ki |
| 35 | MF | KOR | Oh Ju-Po |
| 36 | FW | BRA | Jefferson |

== Player In/Out ==
=== In ===
| 3 | DF | KOR | Cho Hong-Kyu (drafted from Sangji University) |
| 4 | DF | KOR | Park Jung-Sik (drafted from Honam University) |
| 9 | FW | KOR | Jang Nam-Seok (drafted from Chung-Ang University) |
| 13 | MF | KOR | Moon Joo-Won (drafted from Kyunghee University) |
| 22 | MF | KOR | Lee Tae-Woo (drafted from Kyunghee University) |
| 25 | MF | KOR | Hwang Geum-Sung (drafted from Chodang University) |
| 28 | MF | KOR | Yoon Ho (drafted from Dankook University) |
| 31 | DF | KOR | Kim Jong-Bok (drafted from Chung-Ang University) |
| 34 | MF | KOR | Cho Yong-Ki (drafted from Ajou University) |
| 7 | MF | KOR | Park Hee-Wan (from Ulsan Hyundai Mipo FC) |
| 8 | MF | KOR | Ha Dae-Sung (from Ulsan Hyundai Horang-i) |
| 16 | FW | KOR | Hwang Yeon-Seok (from Incheon United) |
| 21 | GK | KOR | Baek Min-Cheol (from FC Seoul) |
| 23 | GK | KOR | Kim Ji-Woon (from Suwon City FC) |
| 26 | FW | BRA | Gabriel Lima (from (Israel) Bnei Sakhnin) |
| 33 | FW | KOR | Seo Kwan-Soo (from Seongnam Ilhwa Chunma) |
| 35 | DF | KOR | Oh Ju-Po (playing coach) |
| 10 | FW | BRA | Eduardo Marques (from (Israel) Maccabi Tel Aviv) |
| 11 | FW | BRA | Dinel (from (Brazil) Mogi Mirim) |
| 36 | FW | BRA | Jefferson (from (Brazil) MFK Petržalka) |
| 26 | MF | KOR | Jin Kyung-Sun (from Ulsan Hyundai Mipo FC) |
| 20 | MF | KOR | Lee Byung-Keun (from Suwon Samsung Bluewings) |

=== Out ===
| 2 | DF | KOR | Lee Mun-Sun (to Seongnam Ilhwa Chunma) |
| 3 | DF | KOR | Jung Ui-Jun (released) |
| 5 | DF | BRA | Ricardo Da Silva (released) |
| 6 | DF | KOR | Min Young-Ki (released) |
| 7 | FW | BRA | Marlon (released) |
| 8 | MF | KOR | Song Jung-Hyun (to Chunnam Dragons) |
| 9 | FW | BRA | Thiago (released) |
| 10 | FW | KOR | Kim Geun-Cheol (to Gyeonnam FC) |
| 11 | FW | BRA | Sandro Hiroshi (to Chunnam Dragons) |
| 13 | MF | KOR | Yoon Won-Il (to Incheon United) |
| 15 | MF | KOR | Nam Young-Youl (to Incheon Korail) |
| 21 | GK | KOR | Kim Jin-Sik (to Suwon City FC) |
| 22 | FW | KOR | Kim Wan-Soo (released) |
| 23 | DF | KOR | Lee Seung-Gun (released) |
| 25 | MF | KOR | Yang Hyun-Jung (released) |
| 31 | GK | KOR | Park Jun-Young (released) |
| 33 | FW | KOR | Jin Soon-Jin (to Chunnam Dragons) |
| 26 | FW | BRA | Gabriel Lima (released) |
| 7 | MF | KOR | Park Hee-Wan (released) |
| 19 | DF | KOR | Choi Seok-Do (released) |
| 19 | FW | KOR | Kim Woo-Cheol (released) |
| 33 | FW | KOR | Seo Kwan-Soo (to Suwon City FC) |

== Statistics ==
| No. | Nat. | Pos. | Player | Total | | K-League | | Korean FA Cup | | Hauzen Cup | |
| No. | Nat. | Pos. | Player | Apps | Goals | Apps | Goals | Apps | Goals | Apps | Goals |
|---|---|---|---|---|---|---|---|---|---|---|---|
| 1 | GK | (South Korea) KOR | Kim Tae-Jin | 12 | -20 | 7 | -9 | 1 | 0 | 4 | -11 |
| 2 | DF | (South Korea) KOR | Lee Mun-Sun | 12 | 0 | 10 | 0 | 0 | 0 | 2 | 0 |
| 3 | DF | (South Korea) KOR | Cho Hong-Kyu | 12 | 0 | 11 | 0 | 0 | 0 | 1 | 0 |
| 4 | MF | (South Korea) KOR | Park Jung-Sik | 11 | 0 | 4 | 0 | 0 | 0 | 7 | 0 |
| 5 | DF | (South Korea) KOR | Hwang Sun-Pil | 25 | 0 | 14 | 0 | 1 | 0 | 10 | 0 |
| 6 | DF | (South Korea) KOR | Choi Sung-Hwan | 32 | 2 | 19 | 1 | 3 | 0 | 10 | 1 |
| 8 | MF | (South Korea) KOR | Ha Dae-Sung | 20 | 1 | 11 | 0 | 2 | 1 | 7 | 0 |
| 9 | FW | (South Korea) KOR | Jang Nam-Seok | 39 | 12 | 23 | 5 | 3 | 3 | 13 | 4 |
| 10 | FW | (Brazil) BRA | Eduardo Marques | 30 | 3 | 24 | 3 | 2 | 0 | 4 | 0 |
| 11 | FW | (Brazil) BRA | Dinel | 29 | 5 | 14 | 1 | 3 | 1 | 12 | 3 |
| 12 | MF | (South Korea) KOR | Lee Sang-Il | 35 | 2 | 20 | 0 | 3 | 1 | 12 | 1 |
| 13 | MF | (South Korea) KOR | Moon Joo-Won | 21 | 1 | 10 | 1 | 2 | 0 | 9 | 0 |
| 14 | MF | (South Korea) KOR | Yoon Ju-Il | 15 | 1 | 12 | 1 | 2 | 0 | 1 | 0 |
| 15 | DF | (South Korea) KOR | Kim Hyun-Soo | 38 | 2 | 23 | 1 | 3 | 1 | 12 | 0 |
| 16 | FW | (South Korea) KOR | Hwang Yeon-Seok | 31 | 7 | 18 | 3 | 3 | 1 | 10 | 3 |
| 17 | MF | (South Korea) KOR | Lim Hyun-woo | 3 | 0 | 1 | 0 | 1 | 0 | 1 | 0 |
| 18 | MF | (South Korea) KOR | Na Hee Keun | 6 | 2 | 5 | 2 | 1 | 0 | 0 | 0 |
| 20 | MF | (South Korea) KOR | Lee Byung-Keun | 1 | 0 | 0 | 0 | 1 | 0 | 0 | 0 |
| 21 | GK | (South Korea) KOR | Baek Min-Cheol | 25 | -28 | 14 | -16 | 2 | -2 | 9 | -10 |
| 22 | MF | (South Korea) KOR | Lee Tae-woo | 2 | 0 | 0 | 0 | 0 | 0 | 2 | 0 |
| 23 | GK | (South Korea) KOR | Kim Ji-Woon | 6 | -5 | 5 | -5 | 0 | 0 | 1 | 0 |
| 24 | DF | (South Korea) KOR | Park Jong-Jin | 39 | 0 | 26 | 0 | 3 | 0 | 10 | 0 |
| 25 | MF | (South Korea) KOR | Hwang Geum-sung | 2 | 0 | 0 | 0 | 0 | 0 | 2 | 0 |
| 26 | MF | (South Korea) KOR | Jin Kyung-sun | 18 | 1 | 12 | 1 | 1 | 0 | 5 | 0 |
| 27 | DF | (South Korea) KOR | Yoon Yeo-san | 12 | 0 | 5 | 0 | 1 | 0 | 6 | 0 |
| 28 | MF | (South Korea) KOR | Yoon Ho | 0 | 0 | 0 | 0 | 0 | 0 | 0 | 0 |
| 29 | DF | (South Korea) KOR | Kim Ju-Hwan | 19 | 0 | 12 | 0 | 0 | 0 | 7 | 0 |
| 30 | MF | (South Korea) KOR | Oh Jang-Eun | 34 | 6 | 24 | 6 | 2 | 0 | 8 | 0 |
| 31 | DF | (South Korea) KOR | Kim Jong-Bok | 0 | 0 | 0 | 0 | 0 | 0 | 0 | 0 |
| 32 | MF | (South Korea) KOR | Song Jeong-Woo | 21 | 2 | 13 | 1 | 1 | 0 | 7 | 1 |
| 34 | MF | (South Korea) KOR | Cho Yong-Ki | 0 | 0 | 0 | 0 | 0 | 0 | 0 | 0 |
| 35 | MF | (South Korea) KOR | Oh Ju-Po | 2 | 0 | 2 | 0 | 0 | 0 | 0 | 0 |
| 36 | FW | (Brazil) BRA | Jefferson | 3 | 0 | 1 | 0 | 0 | 0 | 2 | 0 |
| 7 | MF | (South Korea) KOR | Park Hee-Wan | 2 | 0 | 2 | 0 | 0 | 0 | 0 | 0 |
| 19 | DF | (South Korea) KOR | Choi Seok-Do | 2 | 0 | 2 | 0 | 0 | 0 | 0 | 0 |
| 20 | FW | (South Korea) KOR | Kim Woo-Cheol | 0 | 0 | 0 | 0 | 0 | 0 | 0 | 0 |
| 26 | FW | (Brazil) BRA | Gabriel Lima | 17 | 2 | 12 | 1 | 0 | 0 | 5 | 1 |
| 33 | FW | (South Korea) KOR | Seo Kwan-Soo | 1 | 0 | 0 | 0 | 0 | 0 | 1 | 0 |

== Tongyeong Cup ==
=== Matches ===
| Round | Date | Opponents | Score | Scorers | Ground |
|---|---|---|---|---|---|
| 1 | 23 February 2006 | Beijing Hyundai | 3 - 1 | Yoon Ju-Il 32', Lee Sang-Il 69', Jang Nam-Seok 75' | Tongyeon Stadium |
| 2 | 25 February 2006 | Incheon United | 1 - 0 | Lee Sang-Il | Tongyeon Stadium |
| 3 | 27 February 2006 | Brisbane Roar FC | 0 - 0 | | Tongyeon Stadium |

=== Standings ===
| P | Team | Pld | W | D | L | GF | GA | GD | Pts |
|---|---|---|---|---|---|---|---|---|---|
| 1 | (South Korea) Daegu FC (C) | 3 | 2 | 1 | 0 | 4 | 1 | +3 | 7 |
| 2 | (Australia) Brisbane Roar FC | 3 | 1 | 2 | 0 | 1 | 0 | +1 | 5 |
| 3 | (China) Beijing Hyundai | 3 | 1 | 1 | 1 | 4 | 5 | −1 | 4 |
| 4 | (South Korea) Incheon United | 3 | 0 | 0 | 0 | 2 | 5 | −3 | 0 |

Awards

- 2006 Tongyeong Cup MVP, Top Scorer: Lee Sang-Il (2 Goals)

== K-League ==
=== Standings ===
| Pos | Team | Pld | W | D | L | GF | GA | GD | Pts | Qualification |
|---|---|---|---|---|---|---|---|---|---|---|
| 6 | Jeonnam Dragons | 26 | 7 | 13 | 6 | 28 | 25 | +3 | 34 | Qualification for the Champions League (Note: Qualified as champions of the FA Cup.) |
| 7 | Daegu FC | 26 | 8 | 10 | 8 | 32 | 30 | +2 | 34 | |
| 8 | Busan IPark | 26 | 9 | 7 | 10 | 40 | 42 | −2 | 34 | |

Source: RSSSF

== Korean FA Cup ==
=== Matches ===
| Round | Date | Opponents | H / A | Score | Scorers | Ground |
|---|---|---|---|---|---|---|
| Round of 32 | 19 April 2006 | Daegu University | H | 2 - 1 | Jang Nam-Seok 55', Ha Dae-Sung 86' | Blue Arc |
| Round of 16 | 12 July 2006 | Chung-Ang University | H | 6 - 0 | Dinei 8', Lee Sang-Il 16', Kim Hyun-Soo 21', Hwang Yeon-Seok 46', Jang Nam-Seok 74', 83' | Blue Arc |
| Quarterfinals | 12 August 2006 | Chunnam Dragons | A | 0 - 2 | | Gwangyang City Stadium |

Awards

- 2006 Korean FA Cup Top Scorer: Jang Nam-Seok (3 Goals)

== Samsung Hauzen Cup ==
=== Standings ===
| Pos | Team | Pld | W | D | L | GF | GA | GD | Pts |
|---|---|---|---|---|---|---|---|---|---|
| 12 | Suwon Samsung Bluewings | 13 | 2 | 6 | 5 | 9 | 14 | −5 | 12 |
| 13 | Daegu FC | 13 | 2 | 6 | 5 | 14 | 21 | −7 | 12 |
| 14 | Incheon United | 13 | 1 | 4 | 8 | 11 | 18 | −7 | 7 |

Source: RSSSF

== See also ==
- Daegu FC
