= 2012 VFF Cup =

Tournament details
- Host country: Vietnam
- Dates: 24 – 28 October
- Teams: 4
- Venue(s): 1 (in 1 host city)

Final positions
- Champions: South Korea Universiade (1st title)
- Runners-up: Turkmenistan
- Third place: Vietnam
- Fourth place: Laos

Tournament statistics
- Matches played: 6
- Goals scored: 22 (3.67 per match)

The 2012 VFF Cup was the 9th edition of the annual football tournament organised by the Vietnam Football Federation (VFF) and took place on 24–28 October 2012.

== Venue ==
Ho Chi Minh City
Thong Nhat Stadium
Capacity: 25,000
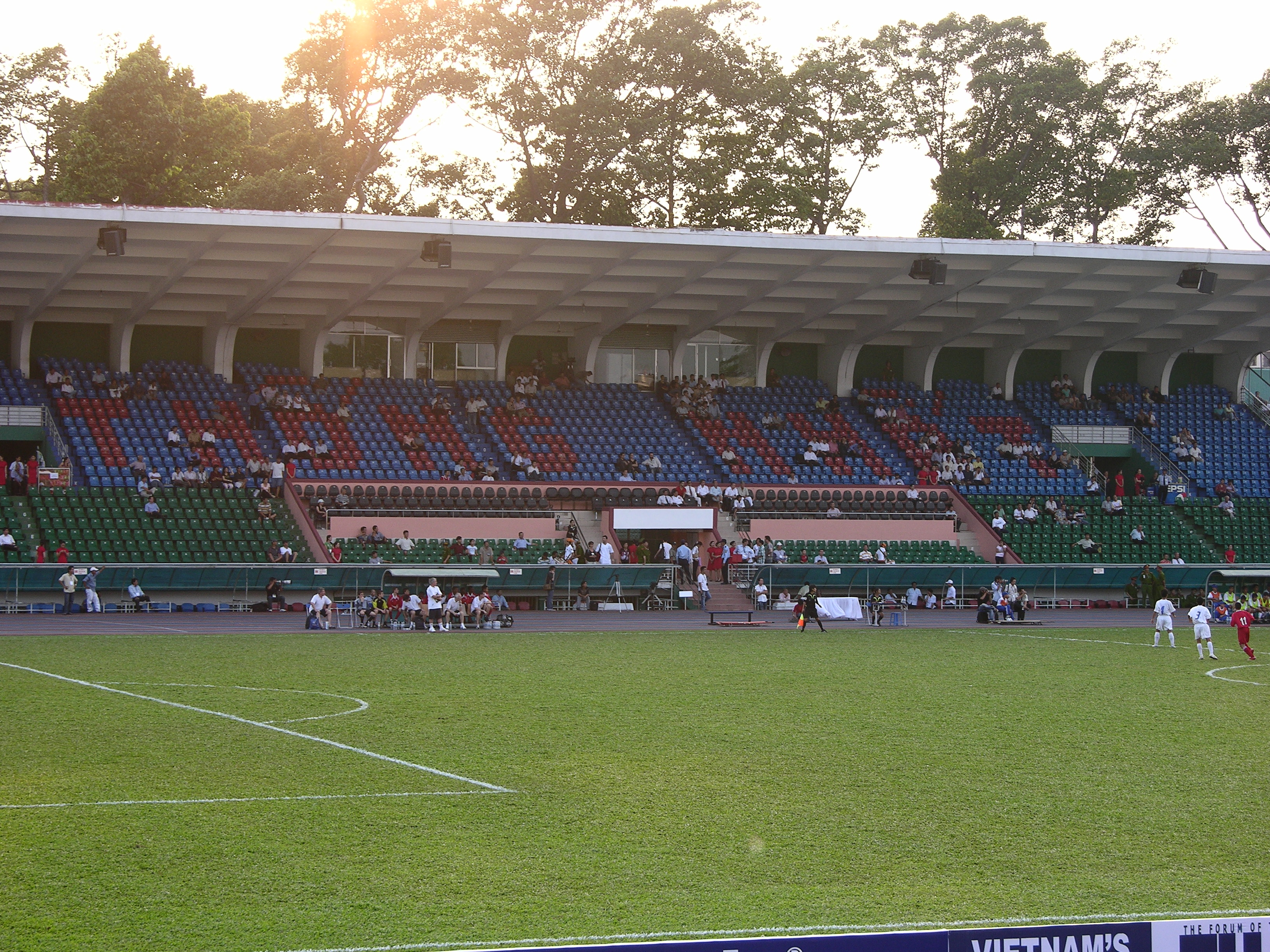

== Results ==
Team	Pld	W	D	L	GF	GA	GD	Pts
South Korea Universiade	3	2	1	0	9	2	+7	7
Turkmenistan	3	2	0	1	5	6	−1	6
Vietnam	3	1	1	1	5	2	+3	4
Laos	3	0	0	3	3	12	−9	0

24 October 2012
16:30

Laos	1–4	South Korea Universiade
Syvilay 12'	Report	Han Seung-yeop 34'; Kim Pyeong-jin 41'; Park Ji-hoon 85'; Lee Jung-kwon 88'

Thong Nhat Stadium, Ho Chi Minh City
Referee: Võ Quang Vinh (Vietnam)
24 October 2012
19:00

Vietnam	0–1	Turkmenistan
	Report	Baýramow 57'

Thong Nhat Stadium, Ho Chi Minh City
Referee: Mohd Yussof Mat Karim (Malaysia)

26 October 2012
16:30

South Korea Universiade	4–0	Turkmenistan
Park Ji-hoon 30'; Gong Min-hyun 52'; Cho In-hyeong 83'; Yang Se-yoon 90+2'	Report

Thong Nhat Stadium, Ho Chi Minh City
26 October 2012
19:00

Vietnam	4–0	Laos
Nguyen Quang Hai 17', 37' (pen.); Nguyen Trong Hoang 77'; Huynh Quoc Anh 80'	Report

Thong Nhat Stadium, Ho Chi Minh City
Referee: Krishnan Ramachandran (Malaysia)

28 October 2012
16:30

Turkmenistan	4–2	Laos
Boliýan 17'; Jumanazarow 30'; Abylow 47'; Muhadow 64'	Report	Liththideth 57'; Saysana 83'

Thong Nhat Stadium, Ho Chi Minh City
Referee: Võ Quang Vinh (Vietnam)
28 October 2012
19:00

Vietnam	1–1	South Korea Universiade
Văn Quyết 57'	Report	Kim Bong-rae 40' (pen.)

Thong Nhat Stadium, Ho Chi Minh City
Referee: Mohd Yussof Mat Karim (Malaysia)

== Goalscorers ==
2 goals

- (Vietnam) Nguyễn Quang Hải

1 goal

- (South Korea) Cho In-hyeong
- (South Korea) Gong Min-hyun
- (South Korea) Han Seung-yeop
- (South Korea) Kim Bong-rae
- (South Korea) Kim Pyeong-jin
- (South Korea) Lee Jung-kwon
- (South Korea) Park Ji-hoon
- (South Korea) Park Jung-bin
- (South Korea) Yang Se-yoon
- (Laos) Keoviengphet Liththideth
- (Laos) Phatthana Syvilay
- (Laos) Sopha Saysana
- (Turkmenistan) Akmyrat Jumanazarow
- (Turkmenistan) Aleksandr Boliýan
- (Turkmenistan) Guwanç Abylow
- (Turkmenistan) Süleyman Muhadow
- (Turkmenistan) Wladimir Baýramow
- (Vietnam) Huỳnh Quốc Anh
- (Vietnam) Nguyễn Trọng Hoàng
- (Vietnam) Nguyễn Văn Quyết
