= 2006 Korean FA Cup =

2006 Hana Bank FA Cup

Tournament details
- Country: South Korea

Final positions
- Champions: Jeonnam Dragons (2nd title)
- Runners-up: Suwon Samsung Bluewings

Tournament statistics
- Top goal scorer: Jang Nam-seok (3 goals)

Awards
- Best player: Kim Hyo-il

The 2006 North Korean FA Cup

== Qualifying round ==
=== First round ===
March 5	Chung-Ang University	1–1 (3–1 p)	Sungkyunkwan University	Ulsan Complex Stadium
	Park Jun-yong 53'		Jung Hee-bong 54'

March 5	INGNEX FC	0–3	Daegu University	Ulsan Complex Stadium
			Yoo Chang-hyun 4'; Cha Ji-hyun 45+1'; Yoon Jun-ha 52'

March 5	Konkuk University	0–0 (5–6 p)	Bongshin Club	Munsu World Cup Stadium Auxiliary Stadium

March 5	Busan Transportation Corporation	1–2	Hongik University	Munsu World Cup Stadium Auxiliary Stadium
	Song Hong-seop 82'		Kim Young-joon 55'; Lee Sang-woo 90'

March 5	University of Ulsan	1–1 (2–4 p)	Hannam University	Gangdong A Stadium
	Lee Dong-seop 90'		Park Jung-ho 25'

March 5	Soongsil University	5–1	Good Bu&Bu	Gangdong A Stadium
	Kim Ju-bong 8'; Kim Byung-suk 60'; Kim Myung-woon 68'; Lim Kyung-hyun 79'; Park Jong-jin 84'		Je Yong-sam 11'

March 5	Honam University	3–0	Pohang City	Gangdong B Stadium
	Kang Sung-joo 4', 88'; Jeon Hyo-jun 57'

March 5	Korea University	0–1	Dongguk University	Gangdong B Stadium
			Kim Jong-soo 59'

== Final rounds ==
=== Bracket ===
Round of 32
Goyang Kookmin Bank (p)	0 (3)
Ulsan Hyundai Horang-i	0 (2)
Gwangju Sangmu	1
Dongguk University	0
Gyeongnam FC	2
Bongshin Club	1
Suwon City	2 (4)
Incheon Korail (p)	2 (5)
FC Seoul	4
Hongik University	0
Changwon City	1
Pohang Steelers	2
Suwon Samsung Bluewings	2
Soongsil University	0
Seosan Citizen	1
Daejeon Citizen	4
Jeonbuk Hyundai Motors	2
Gimpo Hallelujah	0
Icheon Hummel	0
Incheon United	2
Hyundai Mipo Dockyard	2
Gangneung City	1
Jeju United	2 (1)
Honam University (p)	2 (3)
Jeonnam Dragons	2
Hannam University	1
Daejeon KHNP	0
Busan IPark	1
Daegu FC	2
Daegu University	1
Seongnam Ilhwa Chunma	1 (2)
Chung-Ang University (p)	1 (4)

Round of 16
Goyang Kookmin Bank (p)	0 (4)
Gwangju Sangmu	0 (1)
Gyeongnam FC	2
Incheon Korail	1
FC Seoul	3
Pohang Steelers	1
Suwon Samsung Bluewings (p)	1 (4)
Daejeon Citizen	1 (2)
Jeonbuk Hyundai Motors	0 (3)
Incheon United (p)	0 (4)
Hyundai Mipo Dockyard	1
Honam University	2
Jeonnam Dragons	1
Busan IPark	0
Daegu FC	6
Chung-Ang University	0

Quarter-finals
Goyang Kookmin Bank (p)	1 (5)
Gyeongnam FC	1 (3)
FC Seoul	2 (5)
Suwon Samsung Bluewings (p)	2 (6)
Incheon United	2
Honam University	1
Jeonnam Dragons	2
Daegu FC	0

Semi-finals
8 November – Seoul
Goyang Kookmin Bank	0
Suwon Samsung Bluewings	2
8 November – Seoul
Incheon United	0 (3)
Jeonnam Dragons (p)	0 (4)

Final
3 December – Seoul
Suwon Samsung Bluewings	0
Jeonnam Dragons	2

=== Round of 32 ===
April 16	Suwon City	2–2 (4–5 p)	Incheon Korail	Suwon Civil Stadium
	Ahn Dae-hyun 82'; Han Dong-hyuk 88'		Shin Dong-yong 22'; Ha Seung-yong 74'

April 19	Seongnam Ilhwa Chunma	1–1 (2–4 p)	Chung-Ang University	Seongnam 1 Stadium
	Nam Ki-il 86'		Jang Hyuk 56'

April 19	Icheon Hummel	0–2	Incheon United	Icheon City Stadium
			Choi Hyo-jin 68'; Selmir 80'

April 19	Seosan Citizen	1–4	Daejeon Citizen	Seosan City Stadium
	Kim Tae-yeop 77'		Choi Keun-shik 18', 43'; Jeong Shung-hoon 71'; Denilson 87'

April 19	FC Seoul	4–0	Hongik University	Seoul World Cup Stadium Auxiliary Stadium
	Han Dong-won 4'; Han Tae-you 25'; Kim Seung-yong 43'; Choi Jae-soo 53'

April 19	Changwon City	1–2	Pohang Steelers	Changwon Civil Stadium
	Shin Young-jae 8'		Lee Won-jae 53'; Go Seul-ki 65'

April 19	Gyeongnam FC	2–1	Bongshin Club	Changwon Civil Stadium
	Jeon Sang-dae 11'; Kim Dong-chan 61'		Chun Jung-min 35'

April 19	Jeonnam Dragons	2–1	Hannam University	Gwangyang Football Stadium
	Baek Seung-min 53'; Gu Hyun-seo 82'		Lee Yoon-pyo 83'

April 19	Daejeon KHNP	0–1	Busan IPark	Daejeon Hanbat Stadium
			Popó 8'

April 19	Suwon Samsung Bluewings	2–0	Soongsil University	Suwon World Cup Stadium
	Itamar 43'; Seo Dong-hyun 90+2'

April 19	Daegu FC	2–1	Daegu University	Daegu World Cup Stadium
	Jang Nam-seok 55'; Ha Dae-sung 86'		Hong Jin-sub 3'

April 19	Jeju United	2–2 (1–3 p)	Honam University	Jeju World Cup Stadium
	Irineu 3'; Choi Jae-young 48'		Jung Hyun-yong 39'; Kim Jun-beom 62'

April 19	Gwangju Sangmu	1–0	Dongguk University	Gwangju World Cup Stadium
	Lee Jin-ho 63'

April 19	Goyang KB Kookmin Bank	0–0 (3–2 p)	Ulsan Hyundai Horang-i	Goyang Stadium

April 19	Jeonbuk Hyundai Motors	2–0	Gimpo Hallelujah	Jeonju World Cup Stadium
	Zé Carlos 82'; Wang Jung-hyun 87'

April 19	Hyundai Mipo Dockyard	2–1	Gangneung City	Ulsan Complex Stadium
	Lee Jae-chun 5'; Kim Young-ki 78'		Cho Hyun-doo 65'

=== Round of 16 ===
July 12	Jeonbuk Hyundai Motors	0–0 (3–4 p)	Incheon United	Jeonju World Cup Stadium

July 12	Jeonnam Dragons	1–0	Busan IPark	Gwangyang Football Stadium
	Kim Ho-yoo 85'

July 12	Daegu FC	6–0	Chung-Ang University	Daegu World Cup Stadium
	Dinei 8'; Lee Sang-il 16'; Kim Hyun-soo 21'; Hwang Yeon-seok 46'; Jang Nam-seok 74', 83'

July 12	Gyeongnam FC	2–1	Incheon Korail	Changwon Civil Stadium
	Shin Byung-ho 28'; Kim Sung-kil 61'		Kim Nam-woo 71'

July 12	Goyang KB Kookmin Bank	0–0 (4–1 p)	Gwangju Sangmu	Goyang Stadium

July 12	Hyundai Mipo Dockyard	1–2	Honam University	Ulsan Complex Stadium
	Kim Young-hoo 17'		Lee Sung-kyu 23'; Kim Jun-beom 89'

August 1	Suwon Samsung Bluewings	1–1 (4–2 p)	Daejeon Citizen	Suwon World Cup Stadium
	Sabitović 85'		Gong O-kyun 81'

August 1	FC Seoul	3–1	Pohang Steelers	Seoul World Cup Stadium
	Kim Eun-jung 44'; Jung Jo-gook 53'; Park Chu-young 90+1'		Luciano Henrique 77'

=== Quarter-finals ===
August 12	FC Seoul	2–2 (5–6 p)	Suwon Samsung Bluewings	Seoul World Cup Stadium
	Park Chu-young 67'; Dudu 77'		Elpídio Silva 52'; Neretljak 88'

August 12	Goyang KB Kookmin Bank	1–1 (5–3 p)	Gyeongnam FC	Goyang City Stadium
	Yoon Bo-young 7'		Kim Jin-yong 42'

August 12	Jeonnam Dragons	2–0	Daegu FC	Gwangyang City Stadium
	Selmir 3'; Ju Kwang-youn 90+2'

August 12	Incheon United	2–1	Honam University	Incheon Munhak Stadium
	Kim Chi-woo 17'; Choi Hyo-jin 72'		Lee Sung-kyu 22'

=== Semi-finals ===
November 8	Goyang KB Kookmin Bank	0–2	Suwon Samsung Bluewings	Seoul World Cup Stadium
			Elpídio Silva 45+1'; Baek Ji-hoon 90+3'

November 8	Incheon United	0–0 (3–4 p)	Jeonnam Dragons	Seoul World Cup Stadium

=== Final ===
December 3	Suwon Samsung Bluewings	0–2	Jeonnam Dragons	Seoul World Cup Stadium
			Song Jung-hyun 56'; Kim Tae-su 85'

== Awards ==
Award	Winner	Team
Most Valuable Player	(South Korea) Kim Hyo-il	Jeonnam Dragons
Top goalscorer	(South Korea) Jang Nam-seok	Daegu FC
Best Manager	(South Korea) Huh Jung-moo	Jeonnam Dragons
Fair Play Award	Incheon United	

== See also ==
- 2006 in South Korean football
- 2006 K League
- 2006 Korea National League
- 2006 Korean League Cup
