= SBS Cup =

- Organiser(s): Japan Football Association (JFA)
- Founded: 1977
- Region: Shizuoka, Japan (Asia)
- Teams: 4
- Current champions: Colombia (2019)
- Website: Official website (in English)
- 2024 SBS Cup

The SBS Cup is an association football tournament held annually in the Shizuoka Prefecture, Japan.

It began in 1977 as several friendly matches between South Korean and Japanese high schools to celebrate Shizuoka Broadcasting System's (SBS) 25th anniversary. It was expanded to become a tournament in 1979 and since 2002, it has been a round-robin competition for national teams and a representative team from the Shizuoka Prefecture.

== Results ==
Year	Participants
1977	(South Korea) Daeryun High School; (Japan) Jidosha Kogyo High School; (Japan) Fujieda Higashi High School; (Japan) Shimizu Higashi High School
1978	(South Korea) Daejeon Commercial High School; (Japan) Fujieda Higashi High School; (Japan) Shimizu Higashi High School; All-Shizuoka

Year	Champions	Runners-up	Third-place
1979	(South Korea) Cheonggu High School	All-Shizuoka	(Japan) Shizuoka Gakuen High School
1980	All-Shizuoka	(Japan) Shimizu Higashi High School	(South Korea) Cheonggu High School
1981	(Germany) Bayern Munich	All-Shizuoka	(South Korea) Cheonggu High School
1982	All-Shizuoka	(South Korea) Kumho High School	All Japan Junior Youth
1983	All Japan Junior Youth	All-Shizuoka	(South Korea) Iri High School
1984	(Netherlands) Feyenoord	(Japan) Shimizu Higashi High School	(South Korea) Cheonggu High School
1985	All-Shizuoka	(South Korea) Cheonggu High School	(Brazil) XV de Novembro
1986	(Brazil) Juventus-SP	All-Shizuoka	(Japan) Shimizu Higashi High School
1987	(Brazil) Americana EC	(South Korea) Kumho High School	All-Shizuoka
1988	(Brazil) Paraná Selection	All-Shizuoka	(South Korea) Daeryun High School
1989	(Brazil) São Paulo Selection	All-Shizuoka	(South Korea) Pohang Jecheol Technical High School
1990	(Brazil) Botafogo	All-Shizuoka	(South Korea) Daegu Technical High School
1991	(Brazil) Moji-Arara	All-Shizuoka	(Italy) Sampdoria
1992	(Spain) Real Madrid	Czechoslovakia	Japan
1993	Japan	All-Shizuoka	(Spain) Real Madrid
1994	Japan	(Italy) Juventus	(Brazil) Criciúma
1995	Japan	(Brazil) XV de Novembro	All-Shizuoka
1996	(Brazil) Grêmio	All-Shizuoka	Japan
1997	Japan	(Italy) Juventus	(Colombia) América de Cali
1998	(Brazil) Cruzeiro	Japan	(Germany) Borussia Dortmund
1999	Japan	NK Croatia Zagreb	All-Shizuoka
2000	Japan	(Brazil) Palmeiras	All-Shizuoka
2001	(Spain) Valencia	(Brazil) Palmeiras	All-Shizuoka

Year	Champions	Runners-up	Third-place	Fourth-place
2002	Paraguay	Portugal	All-Shizuoka	Japan
2003	Japan	Belgium	All-Shizuoka	Russia
2004	Brazil	Japan	Turkey	All-Shizuoka
2005	Argentina	Japan	Senegal	All-Shizuoka
2006	South Korea	Japan	Mexico	All-Shizuoka
2007	All-Shizuoka	Ukraine	United States	Japan
2008	Argentina	Japan	Australia	All-Shizuoka
2009	Japan	Mexico	France	All-Shizuoka
2010	Japan	Spain	Ghana	All-Shizuoka
2011	All-Shizuoka	Japan	Mexico	Australia
2012	Japan	Portugal	South Korea	All-Shizuoka
2013	Japan	All-Shizuoka	Russia	Uruguay
2014	Colombia	All-Shizuoka	Japan	South Korea
2015	Croatia	Spain	All-Shizuoka	Japan
2016	Slovakia	All-Shizuoka	Costa Rica	Japan
2017	Chile	Czech Republic	Japan	All-Shizuoka
2018	Paraguay	Japan	All-Shizuoka	Australia
2019	Colombia	Japan	All-Shizuoka	Belgium
2022	Uzbekistan	All-Shizuoka	Japan	Uruguay
2023 (details)	Dates: 14–20 August 2023			

== See also ==
- Football in Japan
- 2026 in Japanese football

National teams
Men's

- National football team
- National under-23 football team
- National under-20 football team
- National under-17 football team
- National futsal team
- National under-20 futsal team
- National beach soccer team

Women's

- National football team
- National under-20 football team
- National under-17 football team
- National futsal team
