= 2014 AFC Challenge Cup qualification =

Tournament details
- Dates: 2–26 March 2013
- Teams: 19 (from 1 confederation)

Tournament statistics
- Matches played: 27
- Goals scored: 80 (2.96 per match)
- Attendance: 127,100 (4,707 per match)
- Top scorer(s): (Philippines) Phil Younghusband (5 goals)

The 2014 AFC Challenge Cup qualification phase determined the teams which advanced to the final tournament. The qualification draw was held on 11 December 2012, in AFC House in Kuala Lumpur, Malaysia.

== Qualified nations ==
Country	Qualified as	Date qualification was secured	Previous appearances in tournament
Maldives	Hosts	28 November 2012	1 (2012)
Afghanistan	Group C winner	6 March 2013	2 (2006, 2008)
Myanmar	Group A winner	6 March 2013	2 (2008, 2010)
Palestine	Group D winner	6 March 2013	2 (2006, 2012)
Kyrgyzstan	Group B winner	21 March 2013	2 (2006, 2010)
Philippines	Group E winner	26 March 2013	2 (2006, 2012)
Turkmenistan	Best second place team	26 March 2013	3 (2008, 2010, 2012)
Laos (Note: Bangladesh originally qualified for the 2014 AFC Challenge Cup, but with Brunei's withdrawal, their result against bottom-placed Northern Mariana Islands were declared void, leaving Turkmenistan and Laos as the best two second-placed teams.)	Best second place team	20 March 2013	0 (debut)

== Format ==
Twenty teams expressed their interest to take part before the deadline of 7 September 2012. The Northern Mariana Islands made their Challenge Cup debut after having been approved by the AFC to participate (the Northern Mariana Islands is an associate member of the AFC).

It was decided that starting from this tournament, an automatic qualification place will be given to the AFC Challenge Cup host. The hosting rights were given to Maldives in the AFC Competitions Committee meeting on 28 November.

The twenty teams involved in the qualification draw were drawn into five groups of four teams, with each group containing one team from each of the following seeding pots. Teams in each group will play a single round-robin at a pre-determined host country. The five group winners plus the two best second-placed teams will qualify for the finals.

Below the table of national teams that participated in this qualifications along with their FIFA ranking (and points) as of 7 November 2012 (in bracket with their numbers of ranking are bolded)

Pot 1 ( Hosts )	Pot 2	Pot 3	Pot 4
Kyrgyzstan (**200**; 20 pts); Laos (**179**; 80 pts); Myanmar (**156**; 149 pts); Nepal (**169**; 116 pts); Philippines (**143**; 184 pts)	Turkmenistan (**129**; 254 pts); Palestine (**149**; 168 pts); Tajikistan (**137**; 225 pts); India (**169**; 116 pts); Afghanistan (**167**; 121 pts)	Pakistan (**180**; 72 pts); Bangladesh (**171**; 114 pts); Sri Lanka (**182**; 68 pts); Chinese Taipei (**176**; 90 pts); Cambodia (**191**; 49 pts)	Macau (**199**; 22 pts); Mongolia (**186**; 55 pts); Brunei (**187**; 52 pts) (Withdrew on 20 March 2013); Guam (**181**; 71 pts); Northern Mariana Islands (**Not ranked**; N/A pt)

Following teams did not enter qualifications :

Team (ranking; points at FIFA ranking)	Reason of not entered qualifications
Maldives (**160**; 135 pts)	Qualified as host
North Korea (**81**; 445 pts)	Excluded as they won two previous editions of AFC Challenge Cup
Timor-Leste (**187**; 52 pts)	Either chosen not to participate or missed deadline
Bhutan (**207**; 0 pt)	Either chosen not to participate or missed deadline

Notes :

- It was reported on 26 October 2012 that Cambodia withdrew, citing financial and competitive concerns. However, they were included in the draw.
- Bangladesh were not one of the original 20 teams which the AFC announced as entrants.
- Brunei withdrew their participation a day before the AFC Challenge Cup qualifier in Manila citing unavoidable circumstances. The last minute withdrawal puts the country in a possible AFC Challenge Cup ban. Brunei were supposed to be in Group E of the AFC Challenge Cup qualifiers against hosts Philippines, Cambodia and Turkmenistan.

== Groups ==
Groups A, C and D were played 2–6 March 2013, Group B was played 17–21 March 2013, and Group E was played 22–26 March 2013.

Key to colours in group tables
Group winners and two best second-placed teams qualify for the finals

Tiebreakers

In each group, the teams are ranked according to points (3 points for a win, 1 point for a tie, 0 points for a loss) and tie breakers are in following order:

1. Greater number of points obtained in the group matches between the teams concerned
2. Goal difference resulting from the group matches between the teams concerned
3. Greater number of goals scored in the group matches between the teams concerned (Away goals do not apply)
4. Goal difference in all the group matches
5. Greater number of goals scored in all the group matches
6. Kicks from the penalty mark if only two teams are involved and they are both on the field of play
7. Fewer score calculated according to the number of yellow and red cards received in the group matches (1 point for each yellow card, 3 points for each red card as a consequence of two yellow cards, 3 points for each direct red card, 4 points for each yellow card followed by a direct red card)
8. Drawing of lots

=== Group A ===
Team	Pld	W	D	L	GF	GA	GD	Pts
Myanmar	3	2	1	0	7	1	+6	7
India	3	2	0	1	6	2	+4	6
Guam	3	1	0	2	3	9	−6	3
Chinese Taipei	3	0	1	2	2	6	−4	1

Source: RSSSF
- Matches played in Myanmar (all times UTC+6:30).
2 March 2013
16:00

India	2–1	Chinese Taipei
Raja 40'; Robin 90'	Report	Lee Tai-Lin 54'

Thuwunna Stadium, Yangon
Attendance: 1,000
Referee: Fahad Al-Mirdasi (Saudi Arabia)
2 March 2013
18:45

Myanmar	5–0	Guam
Soe Min Oo 26'; Kyi Lin 40' (pen.); Pyae Phyo Aung 45+2'; Pai Soe 50'; Kyaw Zayar Win 80'	Report

Thuwunna Stadium, Yangon
Attendance: 3,000
Referee: Mohammad Abu Loum (Jordan)

4 March 2013
16:00

Guam	0–4	India
	Report	Chhetri 49', 90+1'; Miranda 68'; Raja 79'

Thuwunna Stadium, Yangon
Attendance: 400
Referee: Khurram Shahzad (Pakistan)
4 March 2013
18:45

Chinese Taipei	1–1	Myanmar
Lee Meng-Chian 80' (pen.)	Report	Soe Kyaw Kyaw 18'

Thuwunna Stadium, Yangon
Attendance: 3,000
Referee: Ko Hyung-Jin (Korea Republic)

6 March 2013
16:00

Chinese Taipei	0–3	Guam
	Report	Cunliffe 15', 78'; Mariano 54'

Thuwunna Stadium, Yangon
Attendance: 700
Referee: Fahad Al-Mirdasi (Saudi Arabia)
6 March 2013
18:45

Myanmar	1–0	India
Soe Min Oo 75'	Report

Thuwunna Stadium, Yangon
Attendance: 6,000
Referee: Mohammad Abu Loum (Jordan)

=== Group B ===
Team	Pld	W	D	L	GF	GA	GD	Pts
Kyrgyzstan	3	3	0	0	3	0	+3	9
Tajikistan	3	2	0	1	4	1	+3	6
Pakistan	3	1	0	2	2	2	0	3
Macau	3	0	0	3	0	6	−6	0

Source: RSSSF
- Matches played in Kyrgyzstan (all times UTC+6).
17 March 2013
12:00

Tajikistan	1–0	Pakistan
Makhmudov 89'	Report

Spartak Stadium, Bishkek
Attendance: 400
Referee: Masoud Tufayelieh (Syria)
17 March 2013
16:00

Kyrgyzstan	1–0	Macau
Tetteh 45+1'	Report

Spartak Stadium, Bishkek
Attendance: 6,000
Referee: Ali Sabah Adday Al-Qaysi (Iraq)

19 March 2013
12:00

Macau	0–3	Tajikistan
	Report	Ismailov 56', 90+2'; Ergashev 82'

Spartak Stadium, Bishkek
Attendance: 800
Referee: Jameel Abdulhusin (Bahrain)
19 March 2013
16:00

Pakistan	0–1	Kyrgyzstan
	Report	Tetteh 1'

Spartak Stadium, Bishkek
Attendance: 12,000
Referee: Ammar Al-Jeneibi (UAE)

21 March 2013
12:00

Pakistan	2–0	Macau
Bashir 44' (pen.); Kalim Ullah 70'	Report

Spartak Stadium, Bishkek
Attendance: 800
Referee: Jameel Abdulhusin (Bahrain)
21 March 2013
16:00

Kyrgyzstan	1–0	Tajikistan
Tetteh 41'	Report

Spartak Stadium, Bishkek
Attendance: 15,500
Referee: Masoud Tufayelieh (Syria)

=== Group C ===
Team	Pld	W	D	L	GF	GA	GD	Pts
Afghanistan	3	2	1	0	3	1	+2	7
Laos	3	1	2	0	6	4	+2	5
Sri Lanka	3	1	0	2	5	5	0	3
Mongolia	3	0	1	2	1	5	−4	1

Source: RSSSF
- Matches played in Laos (all times UTC+7).
2 March 2013
16:00

Afghanistan	1–0	Sri Lanka
Arezou 45'	Report

New Laos National Stadium, Vientiane
Attendance: 200
Referee: Muhammad Taqi Aljaafari Bin Jahari (Singapore)
2 March 2013
19:00

Laos	1–1	Mongolia
Vilayuth 33'	Report	Tumenjargal 45+2'

New Laos National Stadium, Vientiane
Attendance: 1,200
Referee: Ali Shaban (Kuwait)

4 March 2013
16:00

Mongolia	0–1	Afghanistan
	Report	Arezou 59'

New Laos National Stadium, Vientiane
Attendance: 500
Referee: Sgt. Win Cho (Myanmar)
4 March 2013
19:00

Sri Lanka	2–4	Laos
Ratnayake 74'; Gunaratne 81'	Report	Soukaphone 31' (pen.); Vilayuth 47'; Viengsavanh 71'; Sangvone 77'

New Laos National Stadium, Vientiane
Attendance: 1,000
Referee: Mukhtar Al Yarimi (Yemen)

6 March 2013
16:00

Sri Lanka	3–0	Mongolia
Gunaratne 55'; Migara 58', 88'	Report

New Laos National Stadium, Vientiane
Attendance: 200
Referee: Muhammad Taqi Aljaafari Bin Jahari (Singapore)
6 March 2013
19:00

Laos	1–1	Afghanistan
Khampheng 30'	Report	Ahmadi 58'

New Laos National Stadium, Vientiane
Attendance: 3,000
Referee: Ali Shaban (Kuwait)

=== Group D ===
Team	Pld	W	D	L	GF	GA	GD	Pts
Palestine	3	2	1	0	10	0	+10	7
Bangladesh	3	2	0	1	6	1	+5	6
Nepal	3	1	1	1	6	2	+4	4
Northern Mariana Islands	3	0	0	3	0	19	−19	0

Source: RSSSF
- Matches played in Nepal (all times UTC+5:45).
- Match times were originally scheduled at 14:30 and 17:30 but were changed to 14:00 and 17:05 due to technical reasons.
- Match times of the last round of matches were changed again to 15:15 and 18:15 due to bandh organized by political parties.
2 March 2013
14:00

Palestine	1–0	Bangladesh
Dheeb 78'	Report

Dasarath Rangasala Stadium, Kathmandu
Attendance: 4,000
Referee: Mohd Amirul Izwan Bin Yaacob (Malaysia)
2 March 2013
17:05

Nepal	6–0	Northern Mariana Islands
Khawas 4', 41', 72'; Sahukhala 30'; Tamang 60' (pen.); Rai 68'	Report

Dasarath Rangasala Stadium, Kathmandu
Attendance: 17,000
Referee: Fan Qi (China P.R.)

4 March 2013
14:00

Northern Mariana Islands	0–9	Palestine
	Report	Salem 7', 76', 82'; Abuhabib 21' (pen.), 27'; Atiya 23', 90+1'; Dheeb 68'; Abugharqud 83'

Dasarath Rangasala Stadium, Kathmandu
Attendance: 2,700
Referee: Mohanad Qasim Eesee Sarray (Iraq)
4 March 2013
17:05

Bangladesh	2–0	Nepal
Rony 28' (pen.), 57'	Report

Dasarath Rangasala Stadium, Kathmandu
Attendance: 19,000
Referee: Fahad Al-Marri (Qatar)

6 March 2013
15:15

Bangladesh	4–0	Northern Mariana Islands
Toklis 2', 83'; Rony 37'; Linkon 90'	Report

Dasarath Rangasala Stadium, Kathmandu
Attendance: 2,000
Referee: Mohd Amirul Izwan Bin Yaacob (Malaysia)
6 March 2013
18:15

Nepal	0–0	Palestine
	Report

Dasarath Rangasala Stadium, Kathmandu
Attendance: 12,000
Referee: Fan Qi (China P.R.)

=== Group E ===
Team	Pld	W	D	L	GF	GA	GD	Pts
Philippines	2	2	0	0	9	0	+9	6
Turkmenistan	2	1	0	1	7	1	+6	3
Cambodia	2	0	0	2	0	15	−15	0

Source: RSSSF
- Matches played in the Philippines (all times UTC+8).
- On 20 March 2013, Brunei withdrew due to "unavoidable circumstances".
22 March 2013
16:30

Turkmenistan	7–0	Cambodia
Amanow 7'; Baýramow 23', 36'; Thavrak 41' (o.g.); Şamyradow 74'; Abylow 81'; Batyrow 87'	Report

Rizal Memorial Stadium, Manila
Attendance: 200
Referee: Chris Beath (Australia)
22 March 2013
19:30

Philippines	Cancelled	Brunei

Rizal Memorial Stadium, Manila

24 March 2013
16:30

Brunei	Cancelled	Turkmenistan

Rizal Memorial Stadium, Manila
24 March 2013
19:30

Cambodia	0–8	Philippines
	Report	P. Younghusband 26', 31', 34', 88'; Patiño 45', 58'; Schröck 46'; De Murga 90'

Rizal Memorial Stadium, Manila
Attendance: 6,500
Referee: Nivon Robesh Gamini (Sri Lanka)

26 March 2013
16:30

Cambodia	Cancelled	Brunei

Rizal Memorial Stadium, Manila
26 March 2013
19:30

Philippines	1–0	Turkmenistan
P. Younghusband 67'	Report

Rizal Memorial Stadium, Manila
Attendance: 8,000
Referee: Wang Di (China PR)

=== Ranking of second-placed teams ===
To determine the two best second-placed teams, the following criteria were used:

1. Number of points obtained in the group matches
2. Goal difference in the group matches
3. Greater number of goals scored in the group matches
4. Fewer score calculated according to the number of yellow and red cards received in the group matches (1 point for each yellow card, 3 points for each red card as a consequence of two yellow cards, 3 points for each direct red card, 4 points for each yellow card followed by a direct red card)
5. Drawing of lots

For this ranking, the non-participation of Brunei in Group E meant that the results of the matches in the four other groups between the runner-up and the bottom-placed team were declared null and void based on Article 16.1 and Appendix 2 of the tournament regulations.

Grp	Team	Pld	W	D	L	GF	GA	GD	Pts
C	Laos	2	1	1	0	5	3	+2	4
E	Turkmenistan	2	1	0	1	7	1	+6	3
A	India	2	1	0	1	4	1	+3	3
D	Bangladesh	2	1	0	1	2	1	+1	3
B	Tajikistan	2	1	0	1	1	1	0	3

Source: RSSSF

== Goalscorers ==
5 goals

- (Philippines) Phil Younghusband

3 goals

- (Bangladesh) Shakhawat Hossain Rony
- (Kyrgyzstan) David Tetteh
- (Nepal) Bharat Khawas
- (Palestine) Khaled Salem

2 goals

- (Afghanistan) Balal Arezou
- (Bangladesh) Toklis Ahmed
- (Guam) Jason Cunillfe
- (India) Sunil Chhetri
- (India) Jewel Raja
- (Laos) Vilayuth Sayyabounsou
- (Myanmar) Soe Min Oo
- (Palestine) Abdelhamid Abuhabib
- (Palestine) Alaa Atiya
- (Palestine) Haytham Dheeb
- (Philippines) Javier Patiño
- (Sri Lanka) Chathura Gunaratne
- (Sri Lanka) Malik Migara
- (Tajikistan) Jamshed Ismailov
- (Turkmenistan) Wladimir Baýramow

1 goal

- (Afghanistan) Sandjar Ahmadi
- (Bangladesh) Ashraf Mahmud Linkon
- (Chinese Taipei) Lee Meng-Chian
- (Chinese Taipei) Lee Tai-Lin
- (Guam) Ian Mariano
- (India) Clifford Miranda
- (India) Robin Singh
- (Laos) Sangvone Phimmasen
- (Laos) Khampheng Sayavutthi
- (Laos) Viengsavanh Sayyaboun
- (Laos) Soukaphone Vongchiengkham
- (Mongolia) Tsedenbal Tumenjargal
- (Myanmar) Kyaw Zayar Win
- (Myanmar) Kyi Lin
- (Myanmar) Pai Soe
- (Myanmar) Pyae Phyo Aung
- (Myanmar) Soe Kyaw Kyaw
- (Nepal) Sandip Rai
- (Nepal) Santosh Sahukhala
- (Nepal) Raju Tamang
- (Pakistan) Hassan Bashir
- (Pakistan) Kalim Ullah
- (Palestine) Eyad Abugharqud
- (Philippines) Carli de Murga
- (Philippines) Stephan Schröck
- (Sri Lanka) Charitha Ratnayake
- (Tajikistan) Jahongir Ergashev
- (Tajikistan) Khurshed Makhmudov
- (Turkmenistan) Guwanç Abylow
- (Turkmenistan) Arslanmyrat Amanow
- (Turkmenistan) Gurbangeldi Batyrow
- (Turkmenistan) Berdi Şamyradow

Own goal

- (Cambodia) Om Thavrak (playing against Turkmenistan)
