= 2006 in South Korean football =

Football in South Korea
- Season: 2006

Men's football
- K League: Seongnam Ilhwa Chunma
- National League: Goyang Kookmin Bank
- Korean FA Cup: Jeonnam Dragons
- Korean League Cup: FC Seoul
- Korean Super Cup: Ulsan Hyundai Horang-i

This article shows the summary of 2006 football season in South Korea.

== National teams ==
=== FIFA World Cup ===
Former manager Jo Bonfrère qualified for the 2006 FIFA World Cup, but failed to satisfy the expectations of the Korea Football Association. Dick Advocaat replaced Bonfrère to participate in the World Cup, but Advocaat secretly contracted with a Russian club Zenit Saint Petersburg just before the tournament, for which he was criticized.

Despite controversies about managers, South Korea defeated Togo 2–1 and drew 1–1 with eventual finalists France. However, they were eliminated in the group stage after losing 2–0 to Switzerland in the last match.

13 June Group G	South Korea	2–1	Togo	Frankfurt, Germany
15:00 UTC+2	Lee Chun-soo 54'; Ahn Jung-hwan 72'	Report	Kader 31'	Stadium: FIFA WM Stadion Frankfurt; Attendance: 48,000; Referee: Graham Poll (England)

18 June Group G	France	1–1	South Korea	Leipzig, Germany
21:00 UTC+2	Henry 9'	Report	Park Ji-sung 81'	Stadium: Zentralstadion; Attendance: 43,000; Referee: Benito Archundia (Mexico)

23 June Group G	Switzerland	2–0	South Korea	Hanover, Germany
21:00 UTC+2	Senderos 23'; Frei 77'	Report		Stadium: FIFA WM Stadion Hannover; Attendance: 43,000; Referee: Horacio Elizondo (Argentina)

Group G table
Pos	Team	Pld	W	D	L	GF	GA	GD	Pts	Qualification
1	Switzerland	3	2	1	0	4	0	+4	7	Advance to knockout stage
2	France	3	1	2	0	3	1	+2	5	Advance to knockout stage
3	South Korea	3	1	1	1	3	4	−1	4	
4	Togo	3	0	0	3	1	6	−5	0	

=== AFC Asian Cup qualification ===
22 February Group B	Syria	1–2	South Korea	Aleppo, Syria
	Al-Khatib 48'		Kim Do-heon 4'; Lee Chun-soo 49'

16 August Group B	Chinese Taipei	0–3	South Korea	Taipei, Republic of China
			Ahn Jung-hwan 31'; Jung Jo-gook 55'; Kim Do-heon 81'

2 September Group B	South Korea	1–1	Iran	Seoul, South Korea
	Seol Ki-hyeon 45'		Hashemian 90+2'

6 September Group B	South Korea	8–0	Chinese Taipei	Suwon, South Korea
	Seol Ki-hyeon 3', 43'; Jung Jo-gook 5', 45', 89'; Cho Jae-jin 64', 83'; Kim Do-heon 78'

11 October Group B	South Korea	1–1	Syria	Seoul, South Korea
	Cho Jae-jin 8'		Al-Sayed 18'

15 November Group B	Iran	2–0	South Korea	Tehran, Iran
	Enayati 48'; Badamaki 90+1'

Group B table
Pos	Team	Pld	W	D	L	GF	GA	GD	Pts	Qualification
1	Iran	6	4	2	0	12	2	+10	14	Qualification for Asian Cup
2	South Korea	6	3	2	1	15	5	+10	11	Qualification for Asian Cup
3	Syria	6	2	2	2	10	6	+4	8	
4	Chinese Taipei	6	0	0	6	0	24	−24	0	

Source: RSSSF

=== Asian Games ===
28 November Group B	South Korea	3–0	Bangladesh	Doha, Qatar
17:15 EAT (UTC+03)	Lee Chun-soo 2'; Park Chu-young 58', 73'			Stadium: Al-Gharafa Stadium; Referee: Marat Ismailov (Uzbekistan)

2 December Group B	Vietnam	0–2	South Korea	Doha, Qatar
17:15 EAT (UTC+03)			Lee Ho 7'; Kim Jin-kyu 90+2'	Stadium: Grand Hamad Stadium; Referee: Abdullah Balideh (Qatar)

5 December Group B	South Korea	1–0	Bahrain	Al-Rayyan, Qatar
19:45 EAT (UTC+03)	Oh Beom-seok 57'			Stadium: Umm-Affai Stadium; Referee: Krishnan Ramachandran (Malaysia)

Group B table
Pos	Team	Pld	W	D	L	GF	GA	GD	Pts	Qualification
1	South Korea	3	3	0	0	6	0	+6	9	Advance to knockout stage
2	Bahrain	3	2	0	1	7	3	+4	6	
3	Vietnam	3	1	0	2	6	5	+1	3	
4	Bangladesh	3	0	0	3	2	13	−11	0	

Source: RSSSF

9 December Quarter-finals	South Korea	3–0	North Korea	Al-Rayyan, Qatar
19:00 EAT (UTC+03)	Kim Chi-woo 31'; Yeom Ki-hun 34'; Jung Jo-gook 57'			Stadium: Umm-Affai Stadium; Referee: Abdulrahman Racho (Syria)

12 December Semi-finals	Iraq	1–0	South Korea	Doha, Qatar
19:00 EAT (UTC+03)	Saeed 24'			Stadium: Al-Gharafa Stadium; Referee: Ali Al-Badwawi (United Arab Emirates)

14 December Bronze medal match	Iran	1–0 (a.e.t.)	South Korea	Doha, Qatar
17:30 EAT (UTC+03)	Kolahkaj 114'			Stadium: Al-Gharafa Stadium; Referee: Abdulrahman Abdou (Qatar)

=== Friendlies ===
==== Senior team ====
18 January	United Arab Emirates	1–0	South Korea	Dubai, United Arab Emirates
	Khalil 22'

21 January	South Korea	1–1	Greece	Riyadh, Saudi Arabia
	Park Chu-young 24'		Zagorakis 10'

25 January	South Korea	1–0	Finland	Riyadh, Saudi Arabia
	Park Chu-young 46'

29 January	South Korea	2–0	Croatia	Hong Kong
	Kim Dong-jin 35'; Lee Chun-soo 49'

1 February	South Korea	1–3	Denmark	Hong Kong
	Cho Jae-jin 13'		Jacobsen 43'; Bech 64'; Silberbauer 88'

11 February	South Korea	0–1	Costa Rica	Oakland, United States
			Saborío 40'

15 February	South Korea	1–0	Mexico	Los Angeles, United States
	Lee Dong-gook 14'

1 March	South Korea	1–0	Angola	Seoul, South Korea
	Park Chu-young 22'

23 May	South Korea	1–1	Senegal	Seoul, South Korea
	Kim Do-heon 74'		N'Diaye 80'

26 May	South Korea	2–0	Bosnia and Herzegovina	Seoul, South Korea
	Seol Ki-hyeon 50'; Cho Jae-jin 90+2'

1 June	Norway	0–0	South Korea	Oslo, Norway

4 June	South Korea	1–3	Ghana	Edinburgh, Scotland
	Lee Eul-yong 50'		Gyan 36'; Muntari 62'; Essien 80'

8 October	South Korea	1–3	Ghana	Seoul, South Korea
	Kim Dong-hyun 63'		Gyan 48', 83'; Essien 58'

==== Under-23 team ====
14 November	South Korea	1–1	Japan	Changwon, South Korea
20:00 KST (UTC+09)	Park Chu-young 4'		Ahn Tae-eun 64' (o.g.)	Stadium: Changwon Civic Stadium; Attendance: 9,375; Referee: Cheung Yim Yau (Hong Kong)

21 November	Japan	1–1	South Korea	Tokyo, Japan
19:20 JST (UTC+09)	Masuda 74'		Yang Dong-hyun 45'	Stadium: National Olympic Stadium; Attendance: 22,115; Referee: Zhang Lei (China PR)

23 November	United Arab Emirates	0–2	South Korea	Dubai, United Arab Emirates
18:15		Report	Oh Jang-eun 55'; Yeom Ki-hun 66'	Stadium: Al Maktoum Stadium

== Leagues ==
=== K League ===
==== Regular season ====
Pos	Team	Pld	W	D	L	GF	GA	GD	Pts	Qualification
1	Seongnam Ilhwa Chunma	26	14	7	5	42	25	+17	49	First stage winners
2	Pohang Steelers	26	13	8	5	42	28	+14	47	Qualification for playoffs
3	Suwon Samsung Bluewings	26	11	10	5	29	22	+7	43	Second stage winners
4	FC Seoul	26	9	12	5	31	22	+9	39	Qualification for playoffs
5	Ulsan Hyundai Horang-i	26	8	11	7	21	22	−1	35	
6	Jeonnam Dragons	26	7	13	6	28	25	+3	34	Qualification for Champions League (Note: Qualified as champions of FA Cup.)
7	Daegu FC	26	8	10	8	32	30	+2	34	
8	Busan IPark	26	9	7	10	40	42	−2	34	
9	Incheon United	26	7	12	7	24	27	−3	33	
10	Daejeon Citizen	26	7	10	9	28	32	−4	31	
11	Jeonbuk Hyundai Motors	26	5	11	10	24	34	−10	26	Qualification for Champions League (Note: Qualified as defending champions of Champions League.)
12	Gyeongnam FC	26	7	5	14	22	35	−13	26	
13	Jeju United	26	5	10	11	23	30	−7	25	
14	Gwangju Sangmu Bulsajo	26	5	8	13	17	29	−12	23	

Source: RSSSF

==== Championship playoffs ====
Semi-finals
Seongnam Ilhwa Chunma	1
FC Seoul	0
Suwon Samsung Bluewings	1
Pohang Steelers	0

Final
Seongnam Ilhwa Chunma	1	2	3
Suwon Samsung Bluewings	0	1	1

==== Final table ====
Pos	Team	Qualification
1	Seongnam Ilhwa Chunma (C)	Qualification for Champions League
2	Suwon Samsung Bluewings	
3	Pohang Steelers	
4	FC Seoul	

Source: RSSSF
(C) Champions

=== Korea National League ===
==== First stage ====
Pos	Team	Pld	W	D	L	GF	GA	GD	Pts	Qualification
1	Goyang Kookmin Bank	10	8	2	0	26	8	+18	26	Qualification for playoff
2	Changwon City	10	7	0	3	20	13	+7	21	
3	Busan Kyotong	10	5	4	1	21	14	+7	19	
4	Hyundai Mipo Dockyard	10	6	1	3	23	17	+6	19	
5	Suwon City	10	4	4	2	14	11	+3	16	
6	Incheon Korail	10	4	3	3	14	13	+1	15	
7	Gimpo Hallelujah	10	3	3	4	11	12	−1	12	
8	Seosan Citizen	10	2	3	5	7	14	−7	9	
9	Daejeon KHNP	10	1	3	6	8	15	−7	6	
10	Icheon Hummel Korea	10	0	4	6	6	17	−11	4	
11	Gangneung City	10	1	1	8	5	21	−16	4	

Source: RSSSF

==== Second stage ====
Pos	Team	Pld	W	D	L	GF	GA	GD	Pts	Qualification
1	Gimpo Hallelujah	10	7	2	1	16	8	+8	23	Qualification for playoff
2	Hyundai Mipo Dockyard	10	7	1	2	25	13	+12	22	
3	Suwon City	10	5	4	1	17	10	+7	19	
4	Incheon Korail	10	5	3	2	16	8	+8	18	
5	Gangneung City	10	4	4	2	14	11	+3	16	
6	Goyang Kookmin Bank	10	4	2	4	12	10	+2	14	
7	Busan Kyotong	10	3	4	3	13	11	+2	13	
8	Icheon Hummel Korea	10	2	3	5	13	18	−5	9	
9	Daejeon KHNP	10	2	2	6	10	22	−12	8	
10	Changwon City	10	1	3	6	11	22	−11	6	
11	Seosan Citizen	10	0	2	8	6	20	−14	2	

Source: RSSSF

==== Championship playoff ====
Team 1	Agg.	Team 2	1st leg	2nd leg
Gimpo Hallelujah	0–2	Goyang Kookmin Bank (C)	0–0	0–2

== Domestic cups ==
=== Korean FA Cup ===
Round of 32
Goyang Kookmin Bank (p)	0 (3)
Ulsan Hyundai Horang-i	0 (2)
Gwangju Sangmu	1
Dongguk University	0
Gyeongnam FC	2
Bongshin Club	1
Suwon City	2 (4)
Incheon Korail (p)	2 (5)
FC Seoul	4
Hongik University	0
Changwon City	1
Pohang Steelers	2
Suwon Samsung Bluewings	2
Soongsil University	0
Seosan Citizen	1
Daejeon Citizen	4
Jeonbuk Hyundai Motors	2
Gimpo Hallelujah	0
Icheon Hummel	0
Incheon United	2
Hyundai Mipo Dockyard	2
Gangneung City	1
Jeju United	2 (1)
Honam University (p)	2 (3)
Jeonnam Dragons	2
Hannam University	1
Daejeon KHNP	0
Busan IPark	1
Daegu FC	2
Daegu University	1
Seongnam Ilhwa Chunma	1 (2)
Chung-Ang University (p)	1 (4)

Round of 16
Goyang Kookmin Bank (p)	0 (4)
Gwangju Sangmu	0 (1)
Gyeongnam FC	2
Incheon Korail	1
FC Seoul	3
Pohang Steelers	1
Suwon Samsung Bluewings (p)	1 (4)
Daejeon Citizen	1 (2)
Jeonbuk Hyundai Motors	0 (3)
Incheon United (p)	0 (4)
Hyundai Mipo Dockyard	1
Honam University	2
Jeonnam Dragons	1
Busan IPark	0
Daegu FC	6
Chung-Ang University	0

Quarter-finals
Goyang Kookmin Bank (p)	1 (5)
Gyeongnam FC	1 (3)
FC Seoul	2 (5)
Suwon Samsung Bluewings (p)	2 (6)
Incheon United	2
Honam University	1
Jeonnam Dragons	2
Daegu FC	0

Semi-finals
8 November – Seoul
Goyang Kookmin Bank	0
Suwon Samsung Bluewings	2
8 November – Seoul
Incheon United	0 (3)
Jeonnam Dragons (p)	0 (4)

Final
3 December – Seoul
Suwon Samsung Bluewings	0
Jeonnam Dragons	2

=== Korean League Cup ===
Pos	Team	Pld	W	D	L	GF	GA	GD	Pts
1	FC Seoul (C)	13	8	3	2	20	11	+9	27
2	Seongnam Ilhwa Chunma	13	6	4	3	16	12	+4	22
3	Gyeongnam FC	13	7	1	5	16	14	+2	22
4	Daejeon Citizen	13	5	6	2	15	9	+6	21
5	Ulsan Hyundai Horang-i	13	6	3	4	17	12	+5	21
6	Jeonbuk Hyundai Motors	13	6	2	5	15	13	+2	20
7	Jeonnam Dragons	13	6	2	5	14	13	+1	20
8	Jeju United	13	6	2	5	12	12	0	20
9	Pohang Steelers	13	6	1	6	17	19	−2	19
10	Busan IPark	13	4	2	7	14	17	−3	14
11	Gwangju Sangmu Bulsajo	13	4	2	7	9	14	−5	14
12	Suwon Samsung Bluewings	13	2	6	5	9	14	−5	12
13	Daegu FC	13	2	6	5	14	21	−7	12
14	Incheon United	13	1	4	8	11	18	−7	7

Source: RSSSF
(C) Champions

=== Korea National League Championship ===
==== Group stage ====
Group A
Pos	Team	Pld	Pts
1	Hyundai Mipo Dockyard	2	4
2	Goyang KB Kookmin Bank	2	3
3	Gimpo Hallelujah	2	1

Source: Report

Group B
Pos	Team	Pld	Pts
1	Busan Transportation Corporation	3	7
2	Incheon Korail	3	7
3	Seosan Citizen	3	1
4	Gumi Siltron	3	1

Source: Report

Group C
Pos	Team	Pld	Pts
1	Changwon City	2	3
2	Suwon City	2	3
3	Hwaseong Shinwoo Electronics	2	3

Source: Report

Group D
Pos	Team	Pld	Pts
1	Icheon Hummel Korea	2	3
2	Daejeon KHNP	2	3
3	Yeosu FC	2	3

Source: Report

==== Knockout stage ====
Quarter-finals
Hyundai Mipo Dockyard (p)	2 (9)
Suwon City	2 (8)
Busan Transportation Corporation	3
Daejeon KHNP	1
Changwon City	3
Goyang KB Kookmin Bank	2
Icheon Hummel Korea	2
Incheon Korail	0

Semi-finals
Hyundai Mipo Dockyard	2
Busan Transportation Corporation	1
Changwon City	4
Icheon Hummel Korea	1

Final
Hyundai Mipo Dockyard	1
Changwon City	2

=== Korean Super Cup ===
4 March

Ulsan Hyundai Horang-i	1–0	Jeonbuk Hyundai Motors
Jang Sang-won 88'

Ulsan Munsu Football Stadium, Ulsan
Attendance: 7,356

== International cups ==
=== AFC Champions League ===
Team	Result	Round	Aggregate	Score	Venue	Opponent
Jeonbuk Hyundai Motors	Champions	Group E	Winners	3–2	Home	(Japan) Gamba Osaka
Jeonbuk Hyundai Motors	Champions	Group E	Winners	1–1	Away	(Japan) Gamba Osaka
Jeonbuk Hyundai Motors	Champions	Group E	Winners	0–1	Away	(China) Dalian Shide
Jeonbuk Hyundai Motors	Champions	Group E	Winners	3–1	Home	(China) Dalian Shide
Jeonbuk Hyundai Motors	Champions	Group E	Winners	3–0	Home	(Vietnam) Da Nang
Jeonbuk Hyundai Motors	Champions	Group E	Winners	1–0	Away	(Vietnam) Da Nang
Jeonbuk Hyundai Motors	Champions	Quarter-finals	4–3	0–1	Away	(China) Shanghai Shenhua
Jeonbuk Hyundai Motors	Champions	Quarter-finals	4–3	4–2	Home	(China) Shanghai Shenhua
Jeonbuk Hyundai Motors	Champions	Semi-finals	6–5	2–3	Home	(South Korea) Ulsan Hyundai Horang-i
Jeonbuk Hyundai Motors	Champions	Semi-finals	6–5	4–1	Away	(South Korea) Ulsan Hyundai Horang-i
Jeonbuk Hyundai Motors	Champions	Final	3–2	2–0	Home	(Syria) Al-Karamah
Jeonbuk Hyundai Motors	Champions	Final	3–2	1–2	Away	(Syria) Al-Karamah
Ulsan Hyundai Horang-i	Semi-finals	Group F	Winners	2–0	Away	(Japan) Tokyo Verdy
Ulsan Hyundai Horang-i	Semi-finals	Group F	Winners	1–0	Home	(Japan) Tokyo Verdy
Ulsan Hyundai Horang-i	Semi-finals	Quarter-finals	7–0	6–0	Home	(Saudi Arabia) Al-Shabab
Ulsan Hyundai Horang-i	Semi-finals	Quarter-finals	7–0	1–0	Away	(Saudi Arabia) Al-Shabab
Ulsan Hyundai Horang-i	Semi-finals	Semi-finals	4–6	3–2	Away	(South Korea) Jeonbuk Hyundai Motors
Ulsan Hyundai Horang-i	Semi-finals	Semi-finals	4–6	1–4	Home	(South Korea) Jeonbuk Hyundai Motors

=== FIFA Club World Cup ===
Team	Result	Round	Score	Opponent
Jeonbuk Hyundai Motors	Fifth place	Quarter-finals	0–1	(Mexico) América
Jeonbuk Hyundai Motors	Fifth place	Fifth place match	3–0	(New Zealand) Auckland City

== Diary of the season ==
- 13 June: South Korean national team earned its first-ever World Cup victory by defeating Togo 2–1. Ahn Jung-hwan scored his third World Cup goal and became the top scoring Asian player in World Cup history.
- 26 June: Pim Verbeek was appointed as the manager of the South Korean national team, replacing Dick Advocaat who left to Russian club Zenit Saint Petersburg.
- 8 July: Choi Jin-cheul retired as a player after a Korean League Cup match against Incheon United.

== See also ==
- Football in South Korea
