= Nguyễn Quang Hải =

Nguyen Quang Hai or Nguyễn Quang Hải (Vietnamese pronunciation: [ŋwiən˦ˀ˥ kwaːŋ˧˧ haːj˧˩]) may refer to:

- Nguyễn Quang Hải (footballer, born 1985)
- Nguyễn Quang Hải (footballer, born 1997)
