= Tae-woo =

- Hangul: 태우
- RR: Taeu
- MR: T'aeu

Tae-woo is a Korean given name.

People with this name include:

- Jung Tae-woo (born 1982), South Korean actor
- Kim Tae-Woo (wrestler) (born 1962), South Korean freestyle wrestler
- Kim Tae-woo (actor) (born 1971), South Korean actor
- Kim Tae-woo (singer) (born 1981), South Korean singer
- Lee Tae-Woo (born 1984), South Korean football player
- Roh Tae-woo (1932–2021), sixth president of South Korea (1988–1993)

== See also ==
- List of Korean given names
