= Nikita Gorbunow =

Turkmenistan footballer (born 1984)

Nikita Gorbunov
Personal information
- Date of birth: 14 February 1984 (age 42)
- Place of birth: Aşgabat, Soviet Union
- Height: 1.90 m (6 ft 3 in)
- Position: Goalkeeper

Team information
- Current team: Şagadam FK (goalkeeping coach)

Senior career*
Years	Team	Apps	(Gls)
2004–2013	Nisa Asgabat		
2011–2014	FC Balkan		
2015	FC Ahal		
2016–2018	FC Altyn Asyr		
2018	Şagadam FK		
2019	Merw FK		
2019–2021	Şagadam FK		

International career
2005–2019	Turkmenistan	7	(0)

Managerial career
- 2022–: Şagadam (goalkeeping coach)
- * Club domestic league appearances and goals

Nikita Andreyevich Gorbunov (Turkmen: Nikita Andreýewiç Gorbunow; born 14 February 1984) is a Turkmenistani football coach and a former player who played as a goalkeeper. He working as an goalkeeping coach for Şagadam FK from 2022.

== Early life ==
Nikita Gorbunov was born in Askhabad, Turkmen SSR in Russian family.

== Club career ==
In 2013 with FC Balkan Gorbunov won the AFC-President´s Cup 2013 in Malaysia.

In 2015, he moved to FC Ahal. Since 2016 plays for FC Altyn Asyr.

The season of 2019 began in FC Merw. In the summer transfer window 2019 returned to Şagadam FK.

His last game was the 1–0 victory against FC Ahal on 22 December at 2021 Turkmenistan Cup final.

== International ==
Gorbunov was called up to Turkmenistan national team for the games in 2010 FIFA World Cup qualification (AFC).

== Achievements ==
FC Balkan

- AFC President's Cup: 2013

Şagadam FK

- Turkmenistan Cup: 2021
