= Mohammad Masoumizadeh =

Iranian beach soccer player

Personal information
- Date of birth: 18 March 1997 (age 29)
- Place of birth: Bushehr
- Position: Forward

International career
Years	Team	Apps	(Gls)
- Iran national beach soccer team
Medal record
Representing Iran
Men's beach soccer
Asian Beach Games
Gold medal – first place	2026 Sanya

Mohammad Masoumizadeh (Persian: محمد معصومی‌زاده; born March 18, 1997 in Bushehr), is an Iranian player member of national beach soccer team who plays in the forward position. He has been a member of Iran's national beach football team since 2017.

== See also ==
- 2019 AFC Beach Soccer Championship
- 2019 Beach Soccer Intercontinental Cup
- 2018 Beach Soccer Intercontinental Cup
