= Alaa Atiya =

Palestinian professional football player

Personal information
- Date of birth: 3 June 1990 (age 36)
- Place of birth: Gaza, Palestine
- Height: 5 ft 10 in (1.78 m)
- Position: Forward

Team information
- Current team: Al-Yarmouk
- Number: 26

Youth career
- Ittihad Shajaeya

Senior career*
Years	Team	Apps	(Gls)
–2010	Hutteen		
2010–11	Gaza Sport		(24)
2011–	Ittihad Shajaeya	0	(0)
2012–	→ Al-Yarmouk (loan)	4	(2)

International career^{‡}
2012–	Palestine	7	(1)
- * Club domestic league appearances and goals as of 18 August 2011 ‡ National team caps and goals as of 24 December 2011

Alaa Atiya (Arabic: علاء عطية; born 3 June 1990 in Gaza, Palestine) is a Palestinian professional football (soccer) player currently playing for Jordan Premier League side Al-Yarmouk FC on loan from Ittihad Shajaeya.

== Club career ==
He attracted the attention of many scouts when he scored 24 goals for Gaza Sport in the 2010–2011 season with Egyptian side Al-Ahly and Jordanian juggernauts Al-Wahdat most interested in securing his services. After the 2010–11 season he moved to Ittihad Shajaeya but with league play suspended, secured a loan move to Al-Yarmouk. He scored in his debut in a 3–1 loss to Al-Ramtha and would score the winner from the penalty spot against Manshia Bani Hassan. He also scored in the Jordan FA Cup quarterfinal second leg against Manshia Bani Hassan.

== International career ==
In order to play with his country's national team in the 2012 AFC Challenge Cup, Alaa' Attieh agreed to forego $5,000 in wages. Attieh made his debut for Palestine against the United Arab Emirates on 24 February 2012 but was forced off in the first half with an injury. He scored Palestine's first goal at the 2012 AFC Challenge Cup in the third minute against host Nepal and also assisted on Fahed Attal's second goal.

=== International goals ===
Scores and results list the Palestine's goal tally first.

#	Date	Venue	Opponent	Score	Result	Competition
1.	8 March 2012	Dasarath Rangasala Stadium, Kathmandu	Nepal	1–0	2–0	2012 AFC Challenge Cup
	4 March 2013	Dasarath Rangasala Stadium, Kathmandu	Northern Mariana Islands	3–0	9–0	2014 AFC Challenge Cup qualifier
	4 March 2013	Dasarath Rangasala Stadium, Kathmandu	Northern Mariana Islands	9–0	9–0	2014 AFC Challenge Cup qualifier
