= Malik Migara =

Sri Lankan footballer (born 1989)

Personal information
- Full name: Malik Migara Ponnamperumage
- Date of birth: 25 October 1989 (age 37)
- Place of birth: Ragama, Sri Lanka
- Position: Forward

Team information
- Current team: Navy

Senior career*
Years	Team	Apps	(Gls)
2009–10	Ratnam		
2010–	Navy		

International career^{‡}
2010–	Sri Lanka	5	(2)
- * Club domestic league appearances and goals ‡ National team caps and goals as of 26 July 2013

Malik Migara is a Sri Lankan international footballer who plays as a forward for Navy in the Sri Lanka Football Premier League.

Migara played for Sri Lanka at the 2010 AFC Challenge Cup. His two international goals came against Mongolia.

== International goals ==
Scores and results list Nepal's goal tally first.

#	Date	Venue	Opponent	Score	Result	Competition
1.	6 March 2013	New Laos National Stadium, Vientiane	Mongolia	2–0	3–0	2014 AFC Challenge Cup qualification
2.	6 March 2013	New Laos National Stadium, Vientiane	Mongolia	3–0	3–0	2014 AFC Challenge Cup qualification
