= Young Shik Rhee =

South Korean educator (1894–1981)

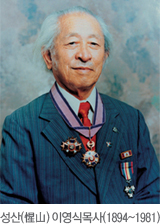
- Born: December 13, 1894; Seongju County, Gyeongsang Province, Korea
- Died: December 8, 1981 (aged 86); Tumon, Guam, United States
- Education: Kobe Theological Seminary
- Known for: Founder of Daegu University

Korean name
- Hangul: 이영식
- Hanja: 李永植
- RR: I Yeongsik
- MR: I Yŏngsik

Reverend Young Shik Rhee (December 13, 1894 – December 8, 1981) was the founder of Daegu University in Daegu, South Korea, a pioneer of special education in Korea, and a Korean independence movement leader in Daegu.

== In the Korean independence movement ==
In September 1919, Rhee was imprisoned for 18 months in Daegu Prison by the Japanese colonial authorities for his leadership role in the March 1st (Samil) Movement and other Korean Independence activities in Daegu. Torture by the Japanese police resulted in permanent hearing loss in one ear.

== As a pastor ==
In 1923, Rhee attended Kobe Theological Seminary (神戶神學校) in Kobe, Japan. He returned to Korea and began Christian ministry in 1927 at Daegu Seomoon Presbyterian Church, where he became an ordained minister. Although popular as pastor and well known for his stirring sermons, Rhee was drawn to serving the least fortunate around him. He embarked on his lifelong journey of social work and ministry by serving as pastor at a leper treatment center in Daegu.

After Korean independence from Japan in 1945, Rhee expanded his social work by looking after orphans and handicapped children. In 1946, Rhee founded the Daegu School for the Blind, the first special education school founded by a Korean. (The very first special education school in Korea, Pyongyang School for the Deaf and Blind, was founded by Rosetta Sherwood Hall, a medical missionary and educator from the U.S., in 1894. In 1913, the Japanese occupation government established the Seoul School for the Blind). When the devastating Korean War (1950–1953) resulted in increased number of war-orphans and the handicapped, Reverend Rhee was among the few who were devoted to helping them. The orphanage housed many handicapped children—who were clothed, fed and taught skills that would help them eventually leave the orphanage and live independently. Reverend Rhee ministered to the children's spiritual and emotional needs, as well as raising funds, eliciting donations and recruiting volunteer teachers and doctors.

== Founding of Daegu University ==
Rhee saw the need to train special education teachers and social workers in addition to furthering the education of handicapped students who had special talents. In 1956, he founded the Korea Social Work School in Daegu. The school became a formal college in 1961. In recognition for the decades of invaluable contributions made by Rhee, South Korean president Park Chung Hee personally awarded him the 5.16 Minjok National Medal (5·16 민족상 교육부문 본상) in May 1969.

Korea Social Work College, founded in 1961, became Daegu University in 1981. Rhee was president from 1961 to 1982. Daegu University installed the first Braille library in Korea in 1981, and the university continues its tradition of being in the forefront of social welfare and special education in Korea.

== Work in the Mariana Islands ==
During the 1970s and 1980s, Rhee traveled extensively to the Mariana Islands in the Pacific where many Korean laborers were forced to work under the Japanese military during the Japanese expansion before and during World War II. Reverend Rhee discovered decades-old burial sites of Korean laborers deep in the jungles of Tinian and repatriated the remains to a national cemetery in Korea (National Cemetery for Overseas Koreans 국립망향의 동산 태평양 사이판 티니안 전몰 무명한국인묘). He also founded a group that erected a Korean Peace Memorial in the island of Saipan (Korean Peace Memorial at Malpi Point, Saipan) and in Tinian (Korean Monuments on Tinian), in remembrance of thousands of Korean laborers who died in those islands.

In 1977, Rhee was awarded the Order of Merit for National Foundation by the South Korean government in recognition for his role in Korean independence.

Rhee died of natural causes in Tumon, Guam, in 1981 at age 87.
