= Maximiliano Estévez =

Argentine footballer

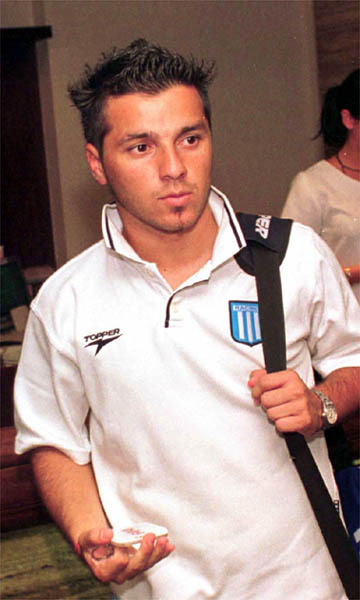

Personal information
- Full name: Carlos Maximiliano Estévez
- Date of birth: June 2, 1977 (age 49)
- Place of birth: Buenos Aires, Argentina
- Height: 1.65 m (5 ft 5 in)
- Position: Second striker

Youth career
- Sacachispas
- Racing Club

Senior career*
Years	Team	Apps	(Gls)
1997–2003	Racing Club	158	(41)
2001	→ Racing Santander (loan)	14	(0)
2004	Morelos	17	(2)
2004–2005	Olimpo	29	(4)
2005–2006	Estrela da Amadora	13	(1)
2006	Estudiantes de Mérida	2	(0)
2007	Deportes Antofagasta	15	(2)
2007–2008	Racing Club	10	(0)
2008	Cerro Porteño	9	(0)
2010	Gela	10	(2)
2010–2011	Almirante Brown	8	(0)
2011–2012	Deportivo Merlo	17	(3)
2012–2014	Sacachispas	38	(6)
2014	Chacarita Juniors	9	(0)
2015	Estudiantes SL	1	(0)
- * Club domestic league appearances and goals

Carlos Maximiliano Estévez (born June 9, 1977) is a former Argentine footballer. He is nicknamed Chanchi.

He has played for Racing Club de Avellaneda and Olimpo de Bahía Blanca in Argentina, Racing de Santander in Spain, Estudiantes de Mérida in Venezuela, Deportes Antofagasta in Chile, Estrela da Amadora in Portugal.

The highlight of his career was with Racing Club during 2001, when he won with the team the Argentine league. This way, Racing broke a 35-year period without local titles.
