= Sopha Saysana =

Laotian footballer

Sopha Saysana (born 9 December 1992) is a Laotian footballer who plays for Thai club Lao Toyota F.C. He has also played for Laos national football team, also appearing for it at the 2012 AFF Suzuki Cup.
