= Jung Ho-jin =

South Korean footballer (born 1984)

Personal information
- Date of birth: May 30, 1984 (age 42)
- Place of birth: South Korea
- Height: 1.87 m (6 ft 2 in)
- Position: Centre back

Youth career
- Dong-eui University

Senior career*
Years	Team	Apps	(Gls)
2007–2008	Daegu		
2008–2010	Gwangju Sangmu		
2011–2012	TTM		
2013	Sisaket	3	(0)
2013	Samut Songkhram		
- * Club domestic league appearances and goals

- Jung Ho-jin
- Hangul: 정호진
- RR: Jeong Hojin
- MR: Chŏng Hojin

Jung Ho-jin (born May 30, 1984) is a South Korean football player who played for Samut Songkhram.
