= Gong Min-hyun =

South Korean footballer

Personal information
- Date of birth: 19 January 1990 (age 36)
- Place of birth: Gwangju, South Korea
- Height: 1.82 m (5 ft 11 1/2 in)
- Position: Forward

Team information
- Current team: Bucheon FC 1995
- Number: 99

Youth career
- 2006–2008: Suwon Technical High School
- 2009–2012: Cheongju University

Senior career*
Years	Team	Apps	(Gls)
2013–2018	Bucheon FC 1995	123	(24)
2016–2017	→ Asan Mugunghwa (army)	50	(8)
2019	Seongnam FC	33	(2)
2020–2021	Jeju United FC	35	(9)
2021-	Daejeon Hana Citizen FC	68	(7)
2021-	→ FC Anyang (loan)	13	(2)
2021-	Bucheon FC 1995	25	(1)
- * Club domestic league appearances and goals as of 25 December 2025

- Gong Min-hyun
- Hangul: 공민현
- RR: Gong Minhyeon
- MR: Kong Minhyŏn

Gong Min-hyun (Korean: 공민현; born 19 January 1990) is a South Korean footballer who plays as forward for Bucheon FC 1995 in K League 2.

== Career ==
He was selected by Bucheon FC 1995 in the 2013 K League draft.
