= Nguyễn Quang Hải (footballer, born 1985) =

Vietnamese footballer

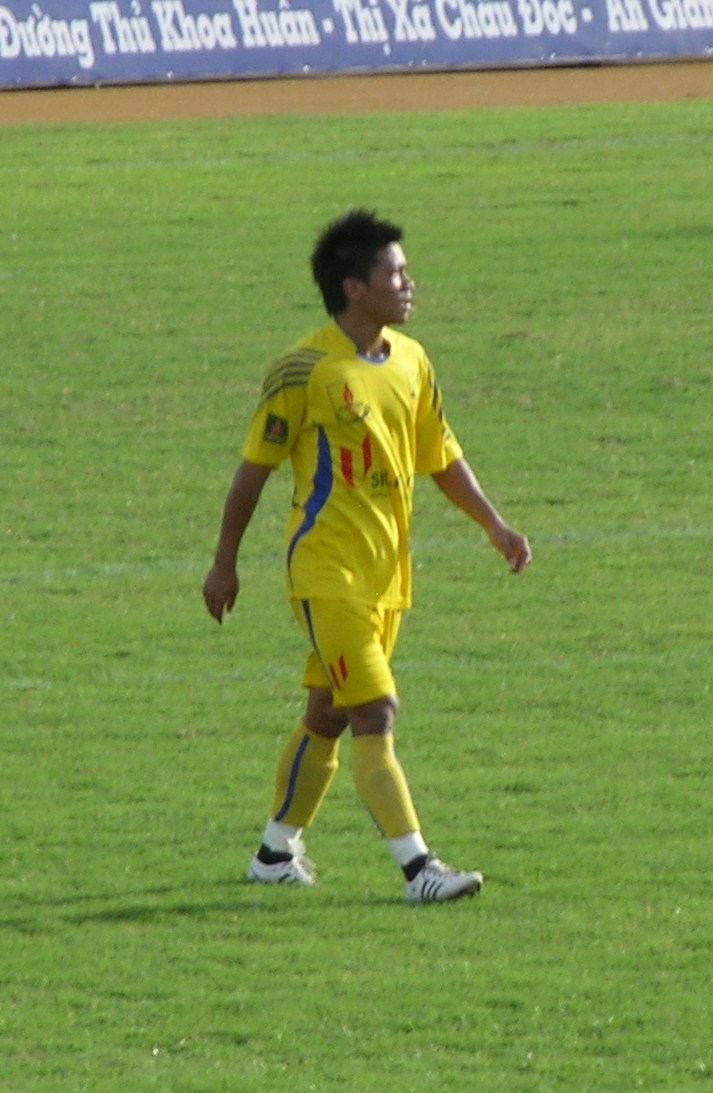

Personal information
- Full name: Nguyễn Quang Hải
- Date of birth: November 1, 1985 (age 40)
- Place of birth: Nha Trang, Khánh Hòa, Vietnam
- Height: 1.64 m (5 ft 5 in)
- Position: Striker

Youth career
- 2001–2004: Khatoco Khánh Hòa

Senior career*
Years	Team	Apps	(Gls)
2004–2010	Khatoco Khánh Hòa	76	(36)
2011–2012	Navibank Sài Gòn	37	(9)
2013–2014	Hải Phòng	38	(13)
2015–2016	Than Quảng Ninh	25	(7)

International career^{‡}
2007–2008	Vietnam U23	4	(1)
2008–2016	Vietnam	40	(7)
- * Club domestic league appearances and goals as of 17 October 2016 ‡ National team caps and goals as of 17 October 2016

Nguyễn Quang Hải (born November 1, 1985) is a former Vietnamese footballer. He was a member of the Vietnam national football team.

== Club career ==
Quang Hải was promoted to the Khánh Hòa first team in 2004 after 3 years of training in the province's football talent class. At that time, the team was playing in the National Second Division. However, during 3 consecutive years, going through many generations of coaches of the club, Quang Hải was still a familiar face on the bench. In the middle of the 2007 V-League season, when Hoang Anh Tuan became the head coach of the team, Quang Hai's training efforts finally paid off. e played more regularly and also scored the decisive goal in the match against Hanoi ACB that year to help Khatoco Khanh Hoa successfully stay in the top flight.

In 2007, Quang Hai was also part of the Khatoco Khanh Hoa U-21 team that won the National U-21 Football Championship for the first time. He scored 5 goals, becoming the top scorer and was voted the Best Player of the tournament.

In the 2008 season, Quang Hai scored 10 goals for Khatoco Khanh Hoa in the V-League 2008 and 6 goals in the National Cup. At the end of the 2010 V-League season, the press reported that Quang Hai would leave at the end of the season. Quang Hai's most successful season at Khanh Hoa was when he scored 13 goals in the V-League 2010.

He signed a 3-year contract with Navibank Saigon for a transfer fee of 9 billion VND and played for the team from 2011.

== International career ==
Thanks to impressive performances in Khatoco Khánh Hòa and U.21 Khatoco Khánh Hòa in the 2007 season, Quang Hải was named in the Vietnam U23 team squad for the 2007 Southeast Asian Games. In the 2007 Southeast Asian Games, he was coached by Vietnam national football team coach Alfred Riedl at the time to remove the players from Nakhon Ratchasima, Thailand, where the 2007 Southeast Asian Games were held. He lost his last chance to join Vietnam U23 because he was 23 years old.

Quang Hải was chosen to play for Vietnam national football team to compete at 2008 AFF Suzuki Cup as he scored a last-minute goal against Singapore in the second leg of the semi-final to bring Vietnam into the final after received the assist from Lê Công Vinh. On May 14, 2009, he scored another late goal in a 1-0 friendly win against Olympiacos F.C., then coached by Ernesto Valverde, but it wasn't an official FIFA international match.

== Honours ==
=== International ===
- AFF Championship: 2008

== International goals ==
Scores and results list Vietnam's goal tally first.

#	Date	Venue	Opponent	Score	Result	Competition
1.	21 December 2008	National Stadium, Kallang, Singapore	Singapore	1–0	1–0	2008 AFF Championship
2.	20 October 2009	Thống Nhất Stadium, Ho Chi Minh City, Vietnam	Turkmenistan	1–0	1–0	2009 Ho Chi Minh City Cup
3.	22 October 2009	Thống Nhất Stadium, Ho Chi Minh City, Vietnam	Singapore	1–0	2–2	2009 Ho Chi Minh City Cup
4.	3 July 2011	Estádio Campo Desportivo, Taipa, Macau	Macau	2–0	7–1	2014 FIFA World Cup qualification – AFC first round
5.	28 July 2011	Mỹ Đình National Stadium, Hanoi, Vietnam	Qatar	2–1	2–1	2014 FIFA World Cup qualification – AFC second round
6.	26 October 2012	Thống Nhất Stadium, Ho Chi Minh City, Vietnam	Laos	1–0	4–0	2012 VFF Cup
7.	26 October 2012	Thống Nhất Stadium, Ho Chi Minh City, Vietnam	Laos	2–0	4–0	2012 VFF Cup
