= Guwanç Abylow =

Turkmen footballer (born 1988)

Personal information
- Date of birth: 30 March 1988 (age 38)
- Place of birth: Ashgabat, Turkmen SSR, USSR
- Position: Midfielder

Team information
- Current team: FC Ahal
- Number: 10

Senior career*
Years	Team	Apps	(Gls)
2007–2012	Ashgabat		
2012–2014	Altyn Asyr		
2015–2016	Hazyna		
2018–	FC Ahal	40	(7)

International career^{‡}
2011–	Turkmenistan	29	(4)
- * Club domestic league appearances and goals as of November 12, 2020 ‡ National team caps and goals as of October 8, 2015

Guvanch Abylov (Turkmen: Guwanç Abylow; born 30 March 1988) is a Turkmen footballer playing for FC Ahal of the Ýokary Liga as a midfielder. He received his first national team cap against Indonesia on 23 June 2011.

== Club career ==
In February 2015, he played his last match with FC Altyn Asyr; in the AFC Cup against Al-Saqr.

Since March 2015, he has played for FC Hazyna.

== International career ==
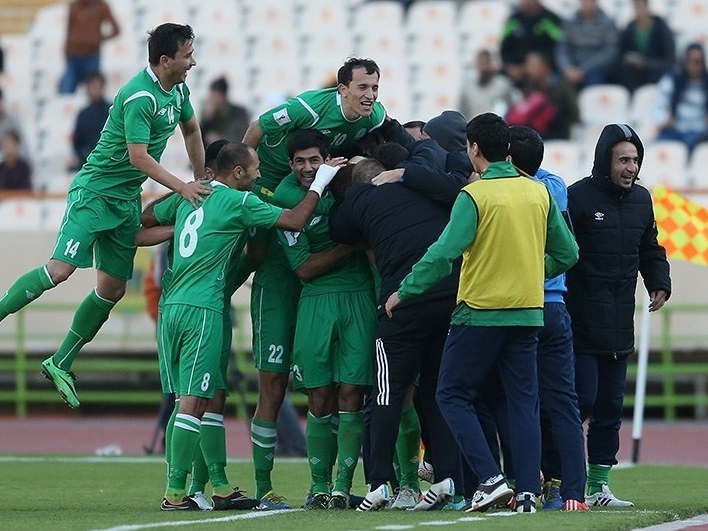
With Turkmenistan in World Cup Qualifying

=== International goals ===
Scores and results list Turkmenistan's goal tally first.

No	Date	Venue	Opponent	Score	Result	Competition
1.	28 October 2012	Thống Nhất Stadium, Ho Chi Minh City, Vietnam	Laos	?	4–2	Friendly
2.	22 March 2013	Rizal Memorial Stadium, Manila, Philippines	Cambodia	6–0	7–0	2014 AFC Challenge Cup qualification
3.	8 October 2015	Köpetdag Stadium, Ashgabat, Turkmenistan	India	1–0	2–1	2018 FIFA World Cup qualification
4.	13 October 2015	Köpetdag Stadium, Ashgabat, Turkmenistan	Guam	1–0	1–0	2018 FIFA World Cup qualification

== Honours ==
=== Club ===
Altyn Asyr

- Ýokary Liga (1): 2014

=== International ===
AFC Challenge Cup

- Runners-up: 2012
