= 2006 Korean League Cup =

2006 Samsung Hauzen Cup
Tournament details
- Country: South Korea
- Dates: 14 May – 29 July 2006
- Teams: 14

Final positions
- Champions: FC Seoul (1st title)
- Runners-up: Seongnam Ilhwa Chunma

Tournament statistics
- Matches played: 91
- Goals scored: 199 (2.19 per match)
- Top goal scorer: Choi Sung-kuk (8 goals)

The 2006 Korean League Cup, also known as the 2006 Samsung Hauzen Cup, was the 19th competition of the Korean League Cup. It was a League Cup, but was run like a league format in this year. All teams played each other once, playing 13 matches each.

Samsung Hauzen Cup is the alternative competition of K League during the activity of the South Korea national team. The 2006 edition was held during summer, allowing the top K League players to focus on the 2006 FIFA World Cup in Germany.

== Table ==
Pos	Team	Pld	W	D	L	GF	GA	GD	Pts
1	FC Seoul (C)	13	8	3	2	20	11	+9	27
2	Seongnam Ilhwa Chunma	13	6	4	3	16	12	+4	22
3	Gyeongnam FC	13	7	1	5	16	14	+2	22
4	Daejeon Citizen	13	5	6	2	15	9	+6	21
5	Ulsan Hyundai Horang-i	13	6	3	4	17	12	+5	21
6	Jeonbuk Hyundai Motors	13	6	2	5	15	13	+2	20
7	Jeonnam Dragons	13	6	2	5	14	13	+1	20
8	Jeju United	13	6	2	5	12	12	0	20
9	Pohang Steelers	13	6	1	6	17	19	−2	19
10	Busan IPark	13	4	2	7	14	17	−3	14
11	Gwangju Sangmu Bulsajo	13	4	2	7	9	14	−5	14
12	Suwon Samsung Bluewings	13	2	6	5	9	14	−5	12
13	Daegu FC	13	2	6	5	14	21	−7	12
14	Incheon United	13	1	4	8	11	18	−7	7

Source: RSSSF
(C) Champions

== Results ==
Home \ Away	BIP	JND	DGU	DJC	SEO	GWJ	GNM	ICU	JJU	JHM	PHS	SIC	SSB	USH
Busan IPark	—	—	5–1	—	1–3	—	0–1	0–0	—	0–2	—	—	1–1	—
Jeonnam Dragons	0–1	—	3–4	0–2	—	2–0	—	—	1–1	—	1–2	—	—	0–0
Daegu FC	—	—	—	0–0	0–0	—	2–0	—	—	3–3	0–1	—	1–2	—
Daejeon Citizen	4–2	—	—	—	0–1	—	—	—	0–1	—	—	0–0	0–0	2–2
FC Seoul	—	1–2	—	—	—	1–0	—	1–0	1–0	4–1	3–4	—	—	—
Gwangju Sangmu	0–1	—	1–1	0–0	—	—	0–1	3–2	—	1–2	2–1	—	—	—
Gyeongnam FC	—	1–0	—	1–2	1–2	—	—	—	2–0	—	—	1–3	—	1–2
Incheon United	—	1–2	0–0	0–1	—	—	2–3	—	—	0–0	—	0–1	1–1	—
Jeju United	0–1	—	1–1	—	—	1–0	—	2–0	—	—	—	2–1	2–0	2–1
Jeonbuk Hyundai Motors	—	0–1	—	0–2	—	—	0–1	—	2–0	—	1–0	—	3–0	—
Pohang Steelers	0–2	—	—	2–2	—	—	0–2	3–2	2–0	—	—	1–2	—	0–2
Seongnam Ilhwa Chunma	2–1	0–1	2–1	—	1–1	0–1	—	—	—	1–0	—	—	—	2–2
Suwon Samsung Bluewings	—	0–1	—	—	1–1	2–0	1–1	—	—	—	0–1	1–1	—	0–1
Ulsan Hyundai Horang-i	2–0	—	3–0	—	0–1	1–0	—	1–3	—	0–1	—	—	—	—

Source: RSSSF
Legend: Blue = home team win; Yellow = draw; Red = away team win.

== Top scorers ==
Rank	Player	Club	Goals	Apps
1	(South Korea) Choi Sung-kuk	Ulsan Hyundai Horang-i	8	13
2	(Brazil) Popo	Busan IPark	7	12
3	(South Korea) Jeong Shung-hoon	Daejeon Citizen	5	8
3	(Brazil) Luciano Henrique	Pohang Steelers	5	11
3	(South Korea) Kim Eun-jung	FC Seoul	5	12
3	(South Korea) Ju Kwang-youn	Jeonnam Dragons	5	13
7	(South Korea) Yeom Ki-hun	Jeonbuk Hyundai Motors	4	11
7	(South Korea) Kim Ki-hyeong	Jeju United	4	12
7	(South Korea) Nam Ki-il	Seongnam Ilhwa Chunma	4	12
7	(South Korea) Jang Nam-seok	Daegu FC	4	13

== Awards ==
Award	Player	Team	Points
Top goalscorer	(South Korea) Choi Sung-kuk	Ulsan Hyundai Horang-i	8 goals
Top assist provider	(Brazil) Dudu	Seongnam Ilhwa Chunma	5 assists

== See also ==
- 2006 in South Korean football
- 2006 K League
- 2006 Korean FA Cup
