= Kim Jae-hong (footballer) =

South Korean football player (born 1984)

Personal information
- Date of birth: 10 August 1984 (age 42)
- Height: 1.79 m (5 ft 10 in)
- Position: Midfielder

Youth career
- Kyung Hee Middle School
- Sinpyeong High School
- –2006: Soongsil University
- 2007: Daegu

Senior career*
Years	Team	Apps	(Gls)
2008	Super Reds		(4)
2009–2011	Geylang United	61	(17)
- * Club domestic league appearances and goals

- Kim Jae-hong
- Hangul: 김재홍
- RR: Gim Jaehong
- MR: Kim Chaehong

Kim Jae-hong (Korean: 김재홍; born 10 August 1984) is a South Korean former footballer.

== Career statistics ==
=== Club ===
Club	Season	League			National Cup		League Cup		Other		Total	
Club	Season	Division	Apps	Goals	Apps	Goals	Apps	Goals	Apps	Goals	Apps	Goals
Geylang United	2009	S.League	16	3	0	0	0	0	0	0	17	2
Geylang United	2010	S.League	15	4	0	0	0	0	0	0	17	2
Geylang United	2011	S.League	30	10	1	0	1	0	0	0	17	2
Career total			61	17	1	0	1	0	0	0	63	17
