= Daeryun High School =

- 대륜고등학교 (大倫高等學校)

Location
- 2700 Dalgubeol-daero; Daegu; South Korea
- Coordinates: 35.851821°N 128.656243°E

Information
- Type: Private
- Motto: Don't deceive oneself, love others
- Established: September 15th, 1921
- Enrollment: 1189 (May 2019)
- Website: School Website

Daeryun High School (Korean: 대륜고등학교; Hanja: 大倫高等學校) is a public high school situated in Suseong District, Daegu, South Korea. Daeryun High School was established on September 15, 1921, and its motto is Don't deceive oneself, love others.

== History ==
The school, originally called Kyonam Hakwon (교남학원), was founded by three men in the Korean independence movement: Hong Ju-Il (홍주일), Kim Youngseo (김영서), and Jeong Ungi (정운기) on September 15, 1921. The name of the school was changed to Daeryun School (대륜학교) in October 1940, and the school moved to its current location in December 1988. The school is planning to celebrate its hundredth anniversary on September 15, 2021, by constructing a historical museum of Daeryun.

== Notable alumni ==
- Yi Sang-hwa
- Yi Yuksa
- Seo Minwoo
