= Akmyrat Jumanazarow =

Turkmenistan footballer

Personal information
- Full name: Akmyrat Geldimyradowiç Jumanazarow
- Date of birth: November 5, 1987 (age 39)
- Place of birth: Mary Region, Turkmenistan
- Position: Defender

Team information
- Current team: Energetik FK
- Number: 4

Senior career*
Years	Team	Apps	(Gls)
- HTTU Aşgabat
2015-2018	Altyn Asyr FK		
2018	Energetik FK		
2019	FC Merw		
2020-	Energetik FK		

International career
2012–	Turkmenistan	10	(0)
- * Club domestic league appearances and goals

Akmyrat Jumanazarow (born 5 November 1987) is a Turkmenistan footballer currently playing for Energetik FK. He has also been capped by the national team 10 times.

== International career ==
Jumanazarow has played for Turkmenistan 10 times, playing in the 2012 AFC Challenge Cup and 2014 AFC Challenge Cup editions as well as the respective qualifying matches.

== Honors ==
AFC Challenge Cup:

- Runners-up: 2012
