= Hwang Yeon-seok =

South Korean footballer (born 1973)

Hwang Yeon-Seok
Personal information
- Date of birth: October 17, 1973 (age 53)
- Place of birth: South Korea
- Height: 1.92 m (6 ft 4 in)
- Position: Forward

Team information
- Current team: Cheonggu High School (coach)

Youth career
- Daegu University

Senior career*
Years	Team	Apps	(Gls)
1995–2003	Seongnam Ilhwa Chunma	197	(39)
2004–2005	Incheon United	14	(1)
2006–2007	Daegu FC	30	(3)
2008	Goyang Kookmin Bank	17	(2)
2009	Seoul United		

International career
1995	South Korea U23	3	(0)
- * Club domestic league appearances and goals

- Hwang Yeon-seok
- Hangul: 황연석
- Hanja: 黃淵奭
- RR: Hwang Yeonseok
- MR: Hwang Yŏnsŏk

Hwang Yeon-Seok (born October 17, 1973) is a retired South Korean football player who is currently coach of Cheonggu High School's team. He played in Seongnam Ilhwa Chunma for nine seasons. At Seongnam, he played 270 games and scored 55 goals, with 28 assists.

At the end of the 2003 season, Hwang transferred to newly formed Incheon United. In Incheon, he played a total of 30 games and scored 3 goals. He played 29 games as a substitute. In 2006, he moved to Daegu FC and played two seasons. At Daegu he played 48 games, with 6 goals and 4 assists in total. In 2008, he moved to Korea National League side Goyang Kookmin Bank.

== Career statistics ==
Appearances and goals by club, season and competition
Club	Season	League			Korean FA Cup		K-League Cup		Asia		Total	
Club	Season	Division	Apps	Goals	Apps	Goals	Apps	Goals	Apps	Goals	Apps	Goals
Seongnam Ilhwa Chunma (Note: "Ilhwa Chunma" until 1995, "Cheonan Ilhwa Chunma" from 1996 to 1999)	1995	K-League	23	6	–		7	3			30	9
Seongnam Ilhwa Chunma	1996	K-League	22	4			6	0				
Seongnam Ilhwa Chunma	1997	K-League	18	3			16	3				
Seongnam Ilhwa Chunma	1998	K-League	13	1			10	3	–			
Seongnam Ilhwa Chunma	1999	K-League	20	6			9	2	–			
Seongnam Ilhwa Chunma	2000	K-League	20	3			11	2				
Seongnam Ilhwa Chunma	2001	K-League	23	5			5	1				
Seongnam Ilhwa Chunma	2002	K-League	21	6			9	2				
Seongnam Ilhwa Chunma	2003	K-League	37	5	2	0	–					
Incheon United	2004	K-League	5	1	1	0	7	1	–		13	2
Incheon United	2005	K-League	9	0	2	0	9	1	–		20	1
Daegu FC	2006	K-League	18	3	3	1	10	3	–		31	7
Daegu FC	2007	K-League	12	0	1	0	8	0	–		21	0
Goyang Kookmin Bank	2008	Korea National League	17	2	3	1	–		–		20	3
Seoul United	2009	K3 League					–		–			
Career total			258	45			107	21				
