= Aleksandr Boliýan =

Turkmen international footballer

Aleksandr Boliyan
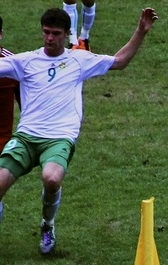

Personal information
- Full name: Aleksandr Boliyan
- Date of birth: July 27, 1989 (age 37)
- Place of birth: Krasnovodsk, Turkmen SSR
- Height: 1.72 m (5 ft 7 1/2 in)
- Position: Striker

Team information
- Current team: Balkan FK
- Number: 11

Senior career*
Years	Team	Apps	(Gls)
2006–2010	Şagadam Türkmenbaşy		(13)
2011	FC Ahal		(6)
2011–2014	Şagadam Türkmenbaşy		
2015	Dinamo Samarqand	5	(0)
2015–2019	Balkan		

International career
2011–2014	Turkmenistan	7	(1)
- * Club domestic league appearances and goals

Aleksander Boliyan (born 27 July 1989) is a Turkmen international footballer. He is currently playing for Balkan FK, and plays on the Turkmenistan national football team.

== Club career ==
Aleksander Boliyan played his first match for Şagadam Türkmenbaşy when he was 16. In his first season for club (2006) he scored 5 goals, then 1 goal in 2007, (unknown number in 2008) and 2 goals in 2009. In 2010 season he became his club's top goalscorer with 5 goals. Next season he moved to FC Ahal (6 goals), but later at summer transfer window he returned to Şagadam. 2012 season was his best season at Şagadam – he scored 23 goals and became League topscorer. From 2015 season player of FK Dinamo Samarqand.

== Career statistics ==
=== International ===
Appearances and goals by national team and year
National team	Year	Apps	Goals
Turkmenistan	2011	2	0
Turkmenistan	2012	3	1
Turkmenistan	2013	–	
Turkmenistan	2014	2	0
Total		7	1

Scores and results list Turkmenistan's goal tally first, score column indicates score after each Boliýan goal.

List of international goals scored by Aleksandr Boliýan
No.	Date	Venue	Opponent	Score	Result	Competition
1	28 October 2012	Thống Nhất Stadium, Ho Chi Minh City, Vietnam	Laos	4–0	4–2	Friendly
