= Ashraf Mahmud Linkon =

Bangladeshi footballer

Personal information
- Full name: Ashraf Mahmud Linkon
- Date of birth: 6 June 1990 (age 36)
- Place of birth: Noakhali, Bangladesh
- Height: 1.76 m (5 ft 9 1/2 in)
- Positions: Defender; midfielder

Senior career*
Years	Team	Apps	(Gls)
2010–2013	Dhaka Abahani		
2013–2014	Sheikh Russel KC		
2015–2016	Sheikh Jamal DC		
2017–2019	Mohammedan SC	22	(0)
2020–2021	NoFeL SC		

International career
2011	Bangladesh U23		
2011–2015	Bangladesh	17	(1)
- * Club domestic league appearances and goals

Ashraf Mahmud Linkon (Bengali: আশরাফ মাহমুদ লিংকন; born 6 June 1990) is a retired Bangladeshi footballer who plays as a midfielder or a full-back. He represented the Bangladesh national football team from 2011 to 2015.
