= Seo Kwan-soo =

South Korean footballer (born 1980)

Seo Kwan-Soo
Personal information
- Full name: Seo Kwan-Soo
- Date of birth: 25 February 1980 (age 46)
- Place of birth: South Korea
- Height: 1.80 m (5 ft 11 in)
- Positions: Forward; midfielder

Youth career
- 1998–2001: Dankook University

Senior career*
Years	Team	Apps	(Gls)
2002–2005	Seongnam Ilhwa	3	(0)
2006	Daegu FC	0	(0)
2007–2008	Suwon City	33	(8)
2009	FC Gifu	17	(0)
2010–2011	Daejeon KHNP	24	(2)

International career
1999	South Korea U-20		
- * Club domestic league appearances and goals as of 21 February 2012

Seo Kwan-Soo (Korean: 서관수; 25 February 1980) is a South Korean football forward and midfielder.

He has formerly played for FC Gifu in the J2 League.

== Club career ==
Seo made his professional debut with Seongnam Ilwha, having joined the club in 2002 from Dankook University. Although he stayed with Seongnam for three seasons, he never featured as a regular at senior level, making only three K-League appearances in this period. He transferred to Daegu FC in 2006, but played only one competitive match for the club, in the League Cup. For 2007, he moved to Suwon City FC, who play in the second tier, semi-professional Korea National League. Following two seasons at Suwon, Seo moved to Japanese J2 League club FC Gifu.
