= Han Seung-yeop =

South Korean footballer (born 1990)

Han Seung-Yeop
Personal information
- Full name: Han Seung-Yeop
- Date of birth: 4 November 1990 (age 36)
- Place of birth: South Korea
- Height: 1.88 m (6 ft 2 in)
- Position: Striker

Team information
- Current team: Daejeon Citizen
- Number: 27

Youth career
- Kyonggi University

Senior career*
Years	Team	Apps	(Gls)
2013–2014	Daegu FC	34	(3)
2014	Yongin City FC	13	(3)
2015	Daejeon Korail FC	18	(5)
2016	Becamex Bình Dương	1	(0)
2017	Daejeon Citizen	4	(0)
2017	Cheonan City	13	(3)
- * Club domestic league appearances and goals as of 30 March 2017

Han Seung-Yeop (Korean: 한승엽; born 4 November 1990) is a South Korean footballer who plays as a striker.

== Club career ==
=== Daegu FC ===
He was selected by Daegu FC in 2013 K League Draft.

=== Becamex Bình Dương ===
Seung-yeop signed with V.League 1 side Becamex Bình Dương in December 2015.

== Career statistics ==
As of match played 30 September 2017

Appearances and goals by club, season and competition
Club	Season	League			Cup (Note: Includes Magyar Kupa, Croatian Football Cup, Malaysia FA Cup and Piala Indonesia.)		Continental (Note: Includes AFC Cup and AFC Champions League.)		Others		Total	
Club	Season	Division	Apps	Goals	Apps	Goals	Apps	Goals	Apps	Goals	Apps	Goals
Daegu FC	2013	K League 1	26	3	1	0	—		—		27	3
Daegu FC	2014	K League 2	8	0	1	0	—		—		9	0
Daegu FC	Total		34	3	2	0	—		—		36	3
Yongin City FC	2014	Korea National League	13	3	—		—		—		13	3
Daejeon Korail FC	2015	Korea National League	18	5	2	1	—		—		20	6
Becamex Binh Duong	2016	V.League 1	1	0	0	0	6	0	—		7	0
Daejeon Citizen	2017	K League 2	4	0	1	1	—		—		5	1
Cheonan City	2017	Korea National League	13	3	—		—		—		13	3
Career total			83	14	5	2	6	0	0	0	94	16
