= Choi Jong-hyuk =

South Korean footballer

Choi Jong-Hyuk
Personal information
- Full name: Choi Jong-Hyuk
- Date of birth: 3 September 1984 (age 42)
- Place of birth: South Korea
- Height: 1.70 m (5 ft 7 in)
- Position: Midfielder

Youth career
- Honam University

Senior career*
Years	Team	Apps	(Gls)
2008–2009	Daegu FC	34	(0)
- * Club domestic league appearances and goals as of 25 July 2009

Choi Jong-Hyuk (Korean: 최종혁; born 3 September 1984) is a South Korean football midfielder.

== Career statistics ==
As of 25 July 2009

Club performance			League		Cup		League Cup		Continental		Total	
Season	Club	League	Apps	Goals	Apps	Goals	Apps	Goals	Apps	Goals	Apps	Goals
South Korea			League		KFA Cup		League Cup		Asia		Total	
2007	Daegu FC	K-League	12	0	1	0	5	0	–		18	0
2008	Daegu FC	K-League	9	0	3	0	7	0	–		19	0
2009	Daegu FC	K-League	13	0	2	0	5	0	–		20	0
Career total			34	0	6	0	17	0			57	0
