= Gabriel Lima (footballer, born 1978) =

Brazilian footballer

Personal information
- Full name: Gabriel Lima
- Date of birth: 13 June 1978 (age 48)
- Place of birth: Cabo Frio, Brazil
- Height: 1.70 m (5 ft 7 in)
- Position: Striker

Senior career*
Years	Team	Apps	(Gls)
1996–1999	Fluminense		
2000	Cabofriense		
2001	Juventus (SP)		
2002	Levski Sofia		
2002–2004	Bnei Sakhnin	46	(15)
2004–2005	Bnei Yehuda	37	(4)
2005	Bnei Sakhnin	6	(0)
2006	Daegu FC	12	(1)
2007	Al-Ahli		
2007	Nanchang Bayi	16	(4)
2008	APOP Kinyras Peyias	14	(2)
2008–2009	Alki Larnaca	28	(5)
2009	AEP Paphos	13	(1)
2010	Doxa Katokopia	4	(0)
2010–2012	Hapoel Ra'anana	45	(6)
- * Club domestic league appearances and goals

Gabriel Lima (born 13 June 1978) is a Brazilian former footballer who played as a striker.

== Career ==
Throughout his career, Lima played football for Alki Larnaca and AEP Paphos in Cyprus. He previously played in Qatar on a US$200,000 contract with Al-Ahli. His last known team was Hapoel Ra'anana in the Israeli Liga Leumit division.

His most memorable achievement came during the 2003–04 season with Bnei Sakhnin, where he led the club to a historic State Cup title; his stellar league play throughout the season saw him score seven goals and provide eight assists in thirty league appearances.
