= Cheonggu High School =

School in Daegu, South Korea

Coordinates: 35°52′6.4″N 128°37′14.4″E

Cheonggu High School is a high school in Daegu, South Korea. The flower that symbolizes the school is a forsythia, and the school's symbolic tree is a juniper.

== Notable alumni ==
- Park Chu-Young
