= Dinei (footballer, born 1981) =

Brazilian footballer

Personal information
- Full name: Ednet Luís De Oliveira
- Date of birth: February 14, 1981 (age 45)
- Place of birth: Santa Bárbara d'Oeste, Brazil
- Height: 1.84 m (6 ft 1/2 in)
- Position: Forward

Senior career*
Years	Team	Apps	(Gls)
2001–2004	Mirassol		
2005	Atlético Sorocaba		
2005	Mogi Mirim		
2006	Daegu FC	14	(1)
2006–2007	América-RN		
2007	Rio Claro		
2008	São Bento		
- * Club domestic league appearances and goals as of 24 February 2007

Dinei, full name Ednet Luís De Oliveira (born February 14, 1981) is a Brazilian footballer who as of 2009 is a free agent.
