= Selmir (footballer) =

Brazilian footballer (born 1979)

Personal information
- Full name: Selmir dos Santos Bezerra
- Date of birth: 23 August 1979 (age 47)
- Place of birth: Fortaleza, Brazil
- Height: 1.82 m (6 ft 0 in)
- Position: Forward

Team information
- Current team: Atlético Tubarão

Senior career*
Years	Team	Apps	(Gls)
1997	Central		
1997–1998	Vitória SC		
1998–1999	Felgueiras		
1999–2000	Os Sandinenses		
2001	Joinville		
2001–2002	Figueirense	25	(6)
2003	Atlético Paranaense	5	(0)
2003	Hapoel Be'er Sheva		
2004	Paysandu	4	(2)
2004	Bahia		
2005	Pohang Steelers	0	(0)
2005	Incheon United	25	(7)
2006	Atlético Paranaense	4	(2)
2006	Incheon United	8	(3)
2006	Chunnam Dragons	12	(4)
2007	Daegu FC	13	(3)
2008	Botafogo-RJ		
2008	Guarani		
2008	Daejeon Citizen	10	(1)
2009	Botafogo-SP		
2009	ABC	16	(1)
2010	Sampaio Corrêa		
2011	Concórdia		
2011	Grêmio Barueri		
2011	Metropolitano	2	(0)
2011	Red Bull Brasil		
2012–	Atlético Tubarão		
- * Club domestic league appearances and goals

Selmir dos Santos Bezerra (born August 23, 1979) is a Brazilian footballer who plays for Atlético Tubarão. He plays as a forward. Selmir is 182 cm tall and weighs 86 kg.

Selmir made his professional debut in 1997 for Central. Selmir has played for various clubs throughout his career. He also played for K-League sides Incheon United, Daegu FC, Chunnam Dragons and Daejeon Citizen. Selmir is Brazilian, but is yet to win any international caps for the Brazil national squad.

== Club career ==
- 1997 (Brazil) Central
- 1997-1998 (Portugal) Vitória SC
- 1998-1999 (Portugal) Felgueiras
- 1999-2000 (Portugal) Os Sandinenses
- 2001 (Brazil) Joinville
- 2001-2002 (Brazil) Figueirense
- 2003 (Brazil) Atlético Paranaense
- 2003 (Israel) Hapoel Be'er Sheva
- 2004 (Brazil) Paysandu
- 2004 (Brazil) Bahia
- 2005 (South Korea) Pohang Steelers
- 2005 (South Korea) Incheon United
- 2006 (Brazil) Atlético Paranaense
- 2006 (South Korea) Incheon United
- 2006 (South Korea) Chunnam Dragons
- 2007 (South Korea) Daegu FC
- 2008 (Brazil) Botafogo-RJ
- 2008 (Brazil) Guarani
- 2008 (South Korea) Daejeon Citizen
- 2009 (Brazil) Botafogo-SP
- 2009 (Brazil) ABC
- 2010 (Brazil) Sampaio Corrêa
- 2011 (Brazil) Concórdia
- 2011 (Brazil) Grêmio Barueri
- 2011 (Brazil) Metropolitano
- 2011 (Brazil) Red Bull Brasil
- 2012–present (Brazil) Atlético Tubarão

== Club Honors ==
- Campeonato Paranaense, 2001
- Campeonato Catarinense, 2001 & 2002
- Copa Sesquicentenário, 2003
