= Kim Ji-woon (footballer) =

South Korean footballer

Personal information
- Birth name: Kim Bong-nae
- Date of birth: 2 July 1990 (age 36)
- Place of birth: South Korea
- Height: 1.78 m (5 ft 10 in)
- Position: Right back

Team information
- Current team: Gyeongnam FC
- Number: 27

Youth career
- Myongji University

Senior career*
Years	Team	Apps	(Gls)
2013–	Jeju United	68	(2)
2016–2017	→ Seoul E-Land (loan)	21	(1)
2017	→ Suwon FC (loan)	13	(0)
2018–2019	→ Asan Mugunghwa (loan)	13	(0)
2021	Daejeon Korail FC		
2022-	Gyeongnam FC		
Korean name
Hangul	김지운
RR	Gim Jiun
MR	Kim Chiun
Former name
Hangul	김봉래
RR	Gim Bongrae
MR	Kim Pongnae
- * Club domestic league appearances and goals as of 8 July 2022

Kim Ji-woon (Korean: 김지운; born Kim Bong-rae, 2 July 1990) is a South Korean footballer who plays as a defender for Gyeongnam FC.

== Career ==
He joined Jeju United from Myongji University on 7 December 2012. He changed his name from Kim Bong-rae to Kim Ji-woon in 2019.
