= Lee Tae-woo =

South Korean footballer

Lee Tae-Woo
Personal information
- Full name: Lee Tae-Woo
- Date of birth: 8 January 1984 (age 42)
- Place of birth: South Korea
- Height: 1.75 m (5 ft 9 in)
- Position: Forward

Team information
- Current team: Suwon City FC
- Number: 32

Youth career
- 2002–2005: Kyunghee University

Senior career*
Years	Team	Apps	(Gls)
2006–2008	Daegu F.C.	2	(0)
2009–	Suwon City FC		
- * Club domestic league appearances and goals as of 6 October 2008

Lee Tae-Woo (Korean: 이태우; born 8 January 1984) is a South Korean football player who currently plays for Korea National League side Suwon City FC. He has spent his career at Daegu FC in the K-League.
