= Daegu University =

Private university in Daegu, South Korea

- 대구대학교
- Motto: 사랑·빛·자유
- Motto in English: "Love, Light, and Freedom"
- Type: Private
- Established: May 1, 1956
- Founders: Rhee Young-shik
- President: Park Soon-jin
- Academic staff: 624
- Administrative staff: 365
- Undergraduates: 15,441
- Postgraduates: 1,570
- Location: Gyeongsan, North Gyeongsang, South Korea; 35°54′08″N 128°50′54″E
- Campus: 268.5 hectares (663 acres); Suburban
- Website: www.daegu.ac.kr

Korean name
- Hangul: 대구대학교
- Hanja: 大邱大學校
- RR: Daegu daehakgyo
- MR: Taegu taehakkyo

Daegu University (Korean: 대구대학교; Hanja: 大邱大學校) is a private university in South Korea. Its campus is located a short distance outside Daegu, in Gyeongsan City, North Gyeongsang province. The school currently consists of 13 colleges from college of humanities to college of rehabilitation. Enrollment currently tops 20,000, and more than 780 professors are employed.

== Academics ==
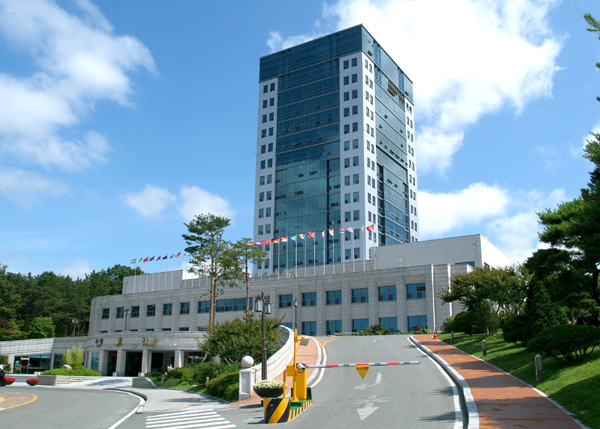
Daegu University Seongsan hall

Traditionally focused on social work, the modern-day offerings of Daegu University cover most major fields of study. Undergraduate colleges include those of the Humanities, Law, Public Administration, Economics & Business Administration, Social Sciences, Natural Sciences, Engineering, Information and Communication Engineering, Natural Resources, Arts and Design, Education, and Rehabilitation Sciences, in addition to the Division of Health Science.

As a university, Daegu University provides graduate training as well. In addition to the main Graduate School, Daegu University includes specialized graduate schools of Education, Industrial Information, Social Welfare, Rehabilitation, and Special Education.

== History ==
Reverend Young Shik Rhee (이영식, 1894–1981) founded Daegu School for the Blind Children (대구맹아학교).

The school remains a part of Daegu University. The university began on May 1, 1956, as the Korea Social Work Institute (한국사회사업학교) in downtown Daegu. Later, it became a college in 1961 (한국사회사업대학). The Gyeongsan campus was opened in 1979. The graduate school opened in 1973.

The school changed from college to university status in 1981 and changed its name from Hansa College to Daegu University.

In 2024, Daegu University announced that it would be closing its sociology department due to declining enrollment.

== See also ==
- List of colleges and universities in South Korea
- Education in South Korea
