= Macau national football team results =

This article details the fixtures and results of the Macau national football team.

== Results and fixtures ==
=== 2009 ===
Date	Tournament	Location	Home team	Away team	Result
11 March 2009	East Asian Football Championship 2010	(Guam) Yona	Macau	Northern Mariana Islands	6-1
13 March 2009	East Asian Football Championship 2010	(Guam) Yona	Macau	Mongolia	1-2
15 March 2009	East Asian Football Championship 2010	(Guam) Yona	Macau	Guam	2-2
7 April 2009	2010 AFC Challenge Cup Qualifier	Macau	Macau	Mongolia	2-0
16 April 2009	2010 AFC Challenge Cup Qualifier	(Mongolia) Ulaanbaatar	Mongolia	Macau	3-1
26 April 2009	2010 AFC Challenge Cup Qualifier	(Bangladesh) Dhaka	Myanmar	Macau	4-0
28 April 2009	2010 AFC Challenge Cup Qualifier	(Bangladesh) Dhaka	Cambodia	Macau	2-1
30 April 2009	2010 AFC Challenge Cup Qualifier	(Bangladesh) Dhaka	Bangladesh	Macau	3-0

=== 2010 ===
Date	Tournament	Location	Home team	Score	Away team
9 October 2010	2010 Long Teng Cup	(Taiwan) Kaohsiung	Chinese Taipei	7:1	Macau
10 October 2010	2010 Long Teng Cup	(Taiwan) Kaohsiung	Hong Kong U23	4:0	Macau
12 October 2010	2010 Long Teng Cup	(Taiwan) Kaohsiung	Philippines	5:0	Macau

=== 2011 ===
Date	Tournament	Location	Home team	Score	Away team
9 February 2011	2012 AFC Challenge Cup qualification	(Cambodia) Phnom Penh	Cambodia	3:1	Macau
16 February 2011	2012 AFC Challenge Cup qualification	Macau	Macau	3:2	Cambodia
20 February 2011	Friendly	Hong Kong	(Hong Kong) Tuen Mun SA	3:2	Macau
23 February 2011	Friendly	Hong Kong	(Hong Kong) South China AA	3:1	Macau

=== 2012 ===
20 July 2012	Northern Mariana Islands	1–5	Macau	(Guam) Leo Palace Resort Soccer Ground, Yona
	K. Schuler 51'		Chan Kin Seng 27', 55', 59'; Ho Man Hou 40'; Vernon Wong 62'	Attendance: 150; Referee: (Japan) J. Iida

22 July 2012	Guam	3–0	Macau	(Guam) Leo Palace Resort Soccer Ground, Yona
	J. Cunliffe 15'; M. Lopez 22'; Z. DeVille 90+3'			Attendance: 1000; Referee: (Japan) J. Iida

25 September 2012	Chinese Taipei	2–2	Macau	(Philippines) Rizal Memorial Stadium, Manila
	Lo Chih-en 48'; Yang Chao-hsun 89' (pen.)		R. Torrão 45'; Chan Kin Seng 57'	Referee: (Philippines) Jovanie Villagracia

27 September 2012	Philippines	5–0	Macau	(Philippines) Rizal Memorial Stadium, Manila
	D. Wolf 22', 45', 64'; C. De Murga 49'; P. Reichelt 69'			Referee: (Vietnam) Vo Quang Vinh

29 September 2012	Macau	0–3	Guam	(Philippines) Rizal Memorial Stadium, Manila
			M. Lopez 45', 55'; D. Naputi 90'	Referee: (Philippines) Jovanie Villagracia

=== 2013 ===
17 March 2013	Kyrgyzstan	1–0	Macau	(Kyrgyzstan) Spartak Stadium, Bishkek
16:00	Tetteh 45+1'	Report		Attendance: 6,000; Referee: Ali Sabah Adday Al-Qaysi (Iraq)

19 March 2013	Macau	0–3	Tajikistan	(Kyrgyzstan) Spartak Stadium, Bishkek
12:00		Report	Ismailov 56', 90+2'; Ergashev 82'	Attendance: 800; Referee: Jameel Abdulhusin (Bahrain)

21 March 2013	Pakistan	2–0	Macau	(Kyrgyzstan) Spartak Stadium, Bishkek
12:00	Bashir 44' (pen.); Kalim Ullah 70'	Report		Attendance: 800; Referee: Jameel Abdulhusin (Bahrain)

=== 2014 ===
21 July 2014 2015 EAFF East Asian Cup preliminary	Guam	0–0	Macau	Harmon, Guam
17:30				Stadium: GFA National Training Center; Referee: Kao Jung-fang (Chinese Taipei)

25 July 2014 2015 EAFF East Asian Cup preliminary	Macau	3–2	Mongolia	Harmon, Guam
15:30	Lam Ka Seng; Chan Man; Tang Hou Fai		Goal	Stadium: GFA National Training Center; Referee: Kao Jung-fang (Chinese Taipei)

14 October 2014 Friendly	Macau	2–2	Singapore	Taipa, Macau
19:00	Leong Ka Hang 53'; Niki Torrão 90'		Khairul Amri 22' 36'	Stadium: Macau University of Science and Technology

=== 2015 ===
12 March 2015 2018 FIFA World Cup qualification	Cambodia	3–0	Macau	Phnom Penh, Cambodia
	Chan 64', 81'; Laboravy 90+4'			Stadium: Army Stadium, Phnom Penh

17 March 2015 2018 FIFA World Cup qualification	Macau	1–1	Cambodia	Taipa, Macau
20:00	Leong Ka Hang 52'		Thierry Bin 28'	Stadium: Estádio Campo Desportivo

=== 2016 ===
28 March 2016 Friendly	Malaysia	0–0	Macau	Malacca City, Malaysia
20:45 UTC+8				Stadium: Hang Jebat Stadium

30 June 2016 2017 EAFF E-1 first preliminary	Macau	2–2	Mongolia	Dededo, Guam
14:30 UTC+10	Leong Ka Hang 37'; Duarte 43'		Oyuunbatyn 9' (pen.), 63' (pen.)	Stadium: Guam Football Association National Training Center; Referee: Kim Woo-sung (South Korea)

2 July 2016 2017 EAFF E-1 first preliminary	Northern Mariana Islands	1–3	Macau	Dededo, Guam
14:30 UTC+10	Griffin 11' (pen.)		Lam Ka Seng 10', 90+4'; Duarte 41'	Stadium: Guam Football Association National Training Center; Referee: Chen Hsin-chuan (Chinese Taipei)

4 July 2016 2017 EAFF E-1 first preliminary	Chinese Taipei	3–2	Macau	Dededo, Guam
17:00 UTC+10	Lin Chien-hsun 36', 64'; Tseng Chih-wei 88'	Report	Chan Man 7'; Lei Ka Him 77'	Stadium: Guam Football Association National Training Center; Referee: Kim Woo-sung (South Korea)

3 November 2016 2016 AFC Solidarity Cup	Macau	2–1	Mongolia	Kuching, Malaysia
19:30 UTC+8	Torrão 15', 75'	Report	Tögöldör 30'	Stadium: Sarawak Stadium; Attendance: 90; Referee: Jansen Foo (Singapore)

6 November 2016 2016 AFC Solidarity Cup	Laos	1–4	Macau	Kuching, Malaysia
16:30 UTC+8	Khamphanh 3'	Report	Lao Pak Kin 21'; Leong Ka Hang 67'; Torrão 79', 87'	Stadium: Sarawak Stadium; Attendance: 67; Referee: Kim Woo-sung (South Korea)

9 November 2016 2016 AFC Solidarity Cup	Sri Lanka	1–1	Macau	Kuching, Malaysia
19:30 UTC+8	Ishan 5'	Report	Choi Weng Hou 86'	Stadium: Sarawak State Stadium; Attendance: 93; Referee: Payam Heidari (Iran)

12 November 2016 2016 AFC Solidarity Cup	Macau	1–1 (4–3 p)	Brunei	Kuching, Malaysia
19:30 UTC+8	Leong Ka Hang 59'	Report	Shahrazen 27'	Stadium: Sarawak Stadium; Attendance: 331; Referee: Kim Woo-sung (South Korea)
	Penalties
	N. Torrão (penalty scored); Leong Ka Hang (penalty scored); Chan Man (penalty scored); Sio Ka Un (penalty scored)		(penalty scored) Faiq; (penalty scored) Shahrazen; (penalty missed) Rosmin; (penalty scored) Azwan S. (penalty missed) Maududi

15 November 2016 2016 AFC Solidarity Cup	Nepal	1–0	Macau	Kuching, Malaysia
19:30 UTC+8	Sujal 29'	Report		Stadium: Sarawak Stadium; Attendance: 157; Referee: Payam Heidari (Iran)

=== 2017 ===
28 March 2017 2019 AFC Asian Cup qualification	Kyrgyzstan	1–0	Macau	Bishkek, Kyrgyzstan
19:30 UTC+6	Baymatov 70'	Report		Stadium: Dolen Omurzakov Stadium; Attendance: 10,600; Referee: Masoud Tufayelieh (Syria)

13 June 2017 2019 AFC Asian Cup qualification	Macau	0–4	Myanmar	Macau
		Report	Sithu Aung 4', 62'; Kyaw Ko Ko 30'; Min Min Thu 74'	Stadium: Estádio Campo Desportivo; Attendance: 1,200; Referee: Kim Dae-yong (South Korea)

1 September 2017 Friendly	Hong Kong	4–0	Macau	Hong Kong
	Lau Ho Lam 2'; M. Luk 6' (pen.); Lam Hok Kei 10', 17'			Stadium: Sham Shui Po Sports Ground

5 September 2017 2019 AFC Asian Cup qualification	Macau	0–2	India	Macau
			B. Singh 57', 82'	Stadium: Estádio Campo Desportivo; Attendance: 600; Referee: Ahmed Al-Ali (Jordan)

2 October 2017 Friendly	Macau	3–1	Laos	Macau
	Leonel 66', 74'; Torrão 83'		Phommathep 56'	Stadium: Estádio Campo Desportivo

11 October 2017 2019 AFC Asian Cup qualification	India	4–1	Macau	Bangalore, India
	Borges 28'; Chhetri 60'; Lam Ka Seng 70' (o.g.); Lalpekhlua 90+2'		Torrão 37'	Stadium: Sree Kanteerava Stadium; Attendance: 4,113; Referee: Yaqoob Abdul Baki (Oman)

14 November 2017 2019 AFC Asian Cup qualification	Macau	3–4	Kyrgyzstan	Macau
	Chan Pak Chun 72'; Torrão 79' (pen.); Leonel 87'		Zemlianukhin 25' (pen.), 55'; Lux 36'; Murzaev 84'	Stadium: Estádio Campo Desportivo; Attendance: 353; Referee: Võ Minh Trí (Vietnam)

=== 2018 ===
22 March Friendly	Macau	0–1	Mauritius	Taipa, Macau
20:00 UTC+8		Report	Bru 19'	Stadium: Estádio Campo Desportivo; Referee: Nivon Robesh Gamini (Sri Lanka)

27 March 2019 AFC Asian Cup qualification	Myanmar	1–0	Macau	Yangon, Myanmar
15:00 UTC+9	Kyi Lin 76'	Report		Stadium: Thuwunna Stadium; Attendance: 4,638; Referee: Minoru Tōjō (Japan)

29 August Friendly	Macau	1–4	Solomon Islands	Taipa, Macau
19:30 UTC+8	Lam Ka Seng 77'	Report	Molea 39'; Kaua 47'; Hou 51'; Totori 61'	Stadium: Estádio Campo Desportivo; Referee: Chan Chon (Macau)

2 September 2019 EAFF E-1 first preliminary	Mongolia	4–1	Macau	Ulaanbaatar, Mongolia
17:00 UTC+8	Seo-Od-Yanjiv 40'; Janchiv 45'; Baljinnyam 74'; Naranbold 83'	Report	Leonel 48'	Stadium: MFF Football Centre; Attendance: 1,654; Referee: Kim Woo-sung (South Korea)

4 September 2019 EAFF E-1 first preliminary	Macau	2–0	Guam	Ulaanbaatar, Mongolia
13:00 UTC+8	Lam Ka Seng 14'; Leong Ka Hang 78'	Report		Stadium: MFF Football Centre; Attendance: 106; Referee: Kao Jung-fang (Chinese Taipei)

6 September 2019 EAFF E-1 first preliminary	Northern Mariana Islands	1–1	Macau	Ulaanbaatar, Mongolia
13:00 UTC+8	Tenorio 33'	Report	Leong Ka Hang 20'	Stadium: MFF Football Centre; Attendance: 17; Referee: Luk Kin Sun (Hong Kong)

=== 2019 ===
6 June 2019 2022 FIFA World Cup qualification	Macau	1–0	Sri Lanka	Zhuhai, China
19:30 UTC+8	Duarte 52'	Report		Stadium: Zhuhai Sports Center Stadium; Attendance: 901; Referee: Kim Dae-yong (South Korea)

11 June 2019 2022 FIFA World Cup qualification	Sri Lanka	3–0 Awarded	Macau	Sugathadasa Stadium, Colombo
15:30 UTC+5:30		Report (FIFA); Report (AFC)		Referee: Çarymyrat Kurbanow (Turkmenistan)

=== 2023 ===
26 March Friendly	Macau	0–1	Singapore	Taipa, Macau
20:00 UTC+8		Report	Lionel Tan 66'	Stadium: Estádio Campo Desportivo; Attendance: 1,000; Referee: Tam Ping Wun (Hong Kong)

19 June Friendly	Macau	0–2	Myanmar	Dalian, China
17:00 UTC+8		Report	Lwin Moe Aung 23'; Maung Maung Lwin 90+4' (pen.)	Stadium: Dalian Pro Soccer Academy Base; Referee: Fu Ming (China)

6 September Friendly	Macau	0–1	Bhutan	Taipa, Macau
19:30 UTC+8		Report	Namgyel 42'	Stadium: Estádio Campo Desportivo; Referee: Woo Chun Sing (Hong Kong)

11 September Friendly	Cambodia	4–0	Macau	Phnom Penh, Cambodia
19:00 UTC+7	Chanthea 19', 21'; Visal 40'; Bunheing 79'	Report		Stadium: National Olympic Stadium; Attendance: 30,000; Referee: Hoàng Ngọc Hà (Vietnam)

12 October 2026 FIFA World Cup qualification	Myanmar	5–1	Macau	Yangon, Myanmar
16:00 UTC+6:30	Lwin Moe Aung 39', 90+5'; Soe Moe Kyaw 62'; Aung Kaung Mann 81'; Nay Moe Naing 90+1'	Report	Torrão 55'	Stadium: Thuwunna Stadium; Attendance: 6,213; Referee: Pranjal Banerjee (India)

17 October 2026 FIFA World Cup qualification	Macau	0–0	Myanmar	Taipa, Macau
		1–5 aggregate		Stadium: Estádio Campo Desportivo; Attendance: 2,187; Referee: Salim Al-Majarafi (Oman)

=== 2024 ===
6 September 2027 AFC Asian Cup qualification	Brunei	3–0	Macau	Bandar Seri Begawan, Brunei
21:00 UTC+8	Hakeme S. 32'; Nazry A. 56'; Hariz H. 61'	Report		Stadium: Hassanal Bolkiah National Stadium; Attendance: 3,794; Referee: Crystal John (India)

10 September 2027 AFC Asian Cup qualification	Macau	0–1	Brunei	Taipa, Macau
19:30 UTC+8		Report	Azwan A. R. 10'	Stadium: Estádio Campo Desportivo; Attendance: 1,368; Referee: Nurzatbek Abdıkadırov (Kyrgyzstan)

14 December 2025 EAFF E-1 preliminary	Macau	1–2	Guam	Kowloon, Hong Kong
14:00 UTC+8	Lei Cheng Lam 41' (pen.)	Report	Morimoto 31'; Taitague 73'	Stadium: Kai Tak Youth Sports Ground; Attendance: 534; Referee: Tam Ping Wun (Hong Kong)

=== 2025 ===
19 March Friendly	Hong Kong	2–0	Macau	Mong Kok, Hong Kong
20:00 UTC+8	Jones 26'; Merkies 40'	Report		Stadium: Mong Kok Stadium; Attendance: 5,464; Referee: Hoang Ngoc Ha (Vietnam)

5 June Friendly	Macau	0–2	Chinese Taipei	Taipei, Taiwan
		Report

7 June Friendly	Macau	2–2	(Chinese Taipei) Taichung Futuro	Taichung, Taiwan
19:15 UTC+8	Lei Ka Him (?); Leung Chi Seng (?)	Report		Stadium: Xitun Football Field

=== 2026 ===
26 March 2026 FIFA Series	Aruba	4–1	Macau	Kigali, Rwanda
13:30 UTC+2	Fermina 5'; Romano 13', 16'; van Kilsdonk 66'	Report	Leong Ka Hang 88'	Stadium: Kigali Pelé Stadium; Referee: Samuel Uwikunda (Rwanda)

29 March 2026 FIFA Series	Macau	0–6	Tanzania	Kigali, Rwanda
15:00 UTC+2		Report	Amâncio 16' (o.g.); Mwamnyeto 26'; Yahya 45'; Peter 56'; Miroshi 74'; Allarakhia 87'	Stadium: Kigali Pelé Stadium; Attendance: 12,900; Referee: Lucky Kasalirwe (Uganda)
