= 2016 AFC U-23 Championship qualification =

- Official logo of the 2016 AFC U-23 Championship Qualification.

Tournament details
- Host countries: Oman (Group A); United Arab Emirates (Groups B and D); Iran (Group C); Bangladesh (Group E); Chinese Taipei (Group F); Thailand (Group G); Indonesia (Group H); Malaysia (Group I); Laos (Group J)
- Dates: 23–31 March 2015 (Group B postponed to 16–20 May 2015)
- Teams: 43 (from 1 confederation)

Tournament statistics
- Matches played: 68
- Goals scored: 244 (3.59 per match)
- Attendance: 226,690 (3,334 per match)
- Top scorer: (Syria) Omar Khribin (6 goals)

The 2016 AFC U-23 Championship qualification was a men's under-23 football competition which decided the participating teams of the 2016 AFC U-23 Championship. Players born on or after 1 January 1993 were eligible to compete in the tournament.

A total of 16 teams qualified to play in the final tournament, including Qatar who qualified automatically as hosts.

The top three teams of the final tournament qualified for the 2016 Summer Olympics men's football tournament in Brazil.

== Draw ==
The draw for the qualifiers was held on 4 December 2014, 11:00 UTC+8, at the AFC House in Kuala Lumpur, Malaysia. A total of 43 AFC member national teams entered the qualifying stage and were drawn into ten groups.

- West Zone had 23 entrants from Central Asia, South Asia and West Asia (excluding hosts Qatar who did not enter the qualifying stage), where they were drawn into three groups of five teams and two groups of four teams
- East Zone had 20 entrants from ASEAN and East Asia, where they were drawn into five groups of four teams.

The teams were seeded according to their performance in the previous season in 2013.

	Pot 1	Pot 2	Pot 3	Pot 4	Pot 5
West Zone (Groups A–E)	Iraq; Jordan; Saudi Arabia; Syria; United Arab Emirates	Iran; Kuwait; Oman; Uzbekistan; Yemen	Bahrain; India; Kyrgyzstan; Nepal; Tajikistan	Bangladesh; Lebanon; Pakistan; Palestine; Sri Lanka	Afghanistan; Maldives; Turkmenistan
East Zone (Groups F–J)	Australia; China; Japan; North Korea; South Korea	Indonesia; Laos; Malaysia; Myanmar; Thailand	Cambodia; Chinese Taipei; Singapore; Timor-Leste; Vietnam	Brunei; Hong Kong; Macau^{1} Mongolia; Philippines	

Did not enter
West Zone	Bhutan
East Zone	Guam; Northern Mariana Islands^{1}

Notes
^{1} Non-IOC member, ineligible for Olympics.

== Format ==
In each group, teams played each other once at a centralised venue. The ten group winners and the best five runners-up from all groups qualified for the final tournament.

=== Tiebreakers ===
The teams were ranked according to points (3 points for a win, 1 point for a draw, 0 points for a loss). If tied on points, tiebreakers would be applied in the following order:

1. Greater number of points obtained in the group matches between the teams concerned;
2. Goal difference resulting from the group matches between the teams concerned;
3. Greater number of goals scored in the group matches between the teams concerned;
4. If, after applying criteria 1 to 3, teams still have an equal ranking, criteria 1 to 3 are reapplied exclusively to the matches between the teams in question to determine their final rankings. If this procedure does not lead to a decision, criteria 5 to 9 apply;
5. Goal difference in all the group matches;
6. Greater number of goals scored in all the group matches;
7. Penalty shoot-out if only two teams are involved and they are both on the field of play;
8. Fewer score calculated according to the number of yellow and red cards received in the group matches (1 point for a single yellow card, 3 points for a red card as a consequence of two yellow cards, 3 points for a direct red card, 4 points for a yellow card followed by a direct red card);
9. Drawing of lots.

== Group stage ==
The matches were played between 23 and 31 March 2015 for Groups A and C (five-team groups); 27–31 March 2015 for Groups D–J (four-team groups); 16–20 May 2015 for Group B (due to postponement).

Legend
Group winners and best five runners-up qualify for the finals

=== Group A ===
- All matches were held in Oman.
- Times listed were UTC+4.

Pos	Team	Pld	W	D	L	GF	GA	GD	Pts	Qualification
1	Iraq	4	3	1	0	15	4	+11	10	Final tournament
2	Oman (H)	4	2	2	0	12	3	+9	8	
3	Bahrain	4	1	2	1	4	3	+1	5	
4	Lebanon	4	1	1	2	3	9	−6	4	
5	Maldives	4	0	0	4	2	17	−15	0	

Source: AFC
Rules for classification: Qualification Tiebreakers
(H) Hosts
23 March 2015
17:30

Bahrain	1–1	Oman
Al-Ajmi 46'	Report	Al-Farsi 77' (pen.)

Sultan Qaboos Sports Complex, Muscat
Attendance: 150
Referee: Yudai Yamamoto (Japan)
23 March 2015
20:30

Maldives	1–2	Lebanon
Irufaan 4'	Report	Khazzaka 65', 79'

Sultan Qaboos Sports Complex, Muscat
Attendance: 100
Referee: Turki Al-Khudayir (Saudi Arabia)

25 March 2015
17:30

Lebanon	1–4	Iraq
Siblini 90+3'	Report	Hussein 44'; Kamel 72', 85'; Waleed 81'

Sultan Qaboos Sports Complex, Muscat
Attendance: 100
Referee: Võ Minh Trí (Vietnam)
25 March 2015
20:30

Maldives	0–3	Bahrain
	Report	Al-Aswad 20', 88' (pen.); Madan 59'

Sultan Qaboos Sports Complex, Muscat
Attendance: 50
Referee: Nivon Robesh Gamini (Sri Lanka)

27 March 2015
17:30

Iraq	7–1	Maldives
Waleed 3', 65'; Kamel 45+2'; Rasan 47', 90+3'; Tariq 76'; Husni 90+2'	Report	H. Mohamed 27'

Sultan Qaboos Sports Complex, Muscat
Attendance: 100
Referee: Turki Al-Khudayir (Saudi Arabia)
27 March 2015
20:30

Oman	4–0	Lebanon
Al-Farsi 11', 60'; Al-Siyabi 16'; Al-Fazari 19'	Report

Sultan Qaboos Sports Complex, Muscat
Attendance: 300
Referee: Abdulrahman Al-Jassim (Qatar)

29 March 2015
17:30

Oman	5–0	Maldives
Al-Malki 7'; Al-Hamhami 20', 24', 56' (pen.); Al-Abdul Salam 72'	Report

Sultan Qaboos Sports Complex, Muscat
Attendance: 200
Referee: Võ Minh Trí (Vietnam)
29 March 2015
20:30

Bahrain	0–2	Iraq
	Report	Hussein 84'; Waleed 88'

Sultan Qaboos Sports Complex, Muscat
Attendance: 150
Referee: Abdulrahman Al-Jassim (Qatar)

31 March 2015
17:30

Lebanon	0–0	Bahrain
	Report

Sultan Qaboos Sports Complex, Muscat
Attendance: 50
Referee: Turki Al-Khudayir (Saudi Arabia)
31 March 2015
20:30

Iraq	2–2	Oman
Mabrook 3' (o.g.); Kamel 47'	Report	Al-Farsi 88' (pen.); Al-Hinai 88'

Sultan Qaboos Sports Complex, Muscat
Attendance: 400
Referee: Yudai Yamamoto (Japan)

=== Group B ===
- All matches were originally scheduled to be held in Pakistan, between 23 and 31 March 2015 at Punjab Stadium, Lahore, but were postponed due to safety and security reasons after bombings and civil unrest in the city.
- All matches were later scheduled to be held in the United Arab Emirates between 16 and 24 May 2015. After the withdrawal of Turkmenistan, the dates were shortened to 16–20 May 2015.
- Times listed were UTC+4.

Pos	Team	Pld	W	D	L	GF	GA	GD	Pts	Qualification
1	Jordan	3	2	1	0	12	3	+9	7	Final tournament
2	Kuwait	3	1	2	0	5	3	+2	5	
3	Pakistan	3	1	0	2	3	8	−5	3	
4	Kyrgyzstan	3	0	1	2	1	7	−6	1	
5	Turkmenistan	0	0	0	0	0	0	0	0	Withdrew

Source: AFC
Rules for classification: Qualification Tiebreakers
16 May 2015
18:15

Jordan	5–0	Pakistan
Mardi 11', 64'; Rateb 23'; Al-Bashtawi 66', 79'	Report

Tahnoun bin Mohammed Stadium, Al Ain
Attendance: 470
Referee: Fahad Al-Marri (Qatar)
16 May 2015
21:15

Kuwait	0–0	Kyrgyzstan
	Report

Tahnoun bin Mohammed Stadium, Al Ain
Attendance: 213
Referee: Ma Ning (China)

18 May 2015
18:15

Pakistan	0–2	Kuwait
	Report	Al-Azemi 3', 8'

Tahnoun bin Mohammed Stadium, Al Ain
Attendance: 121
Referee: Hettikamkanamge Perera (Sri Lanka)
18 May 2015
21:15

Kyrgyzstan	0–4	Jordan
	Report	Rateb 3'; Shelbaieh 65'; Faisal 70'; Mardi 90'

Tahnoun bin Mohammed Stadium, Al Ain
Attendance: 487
Referee: Ali Sabah Adday Al-Qaysi (Iraq)

20 May 2015
18:15

Jordan	3–3	Kuwait
Faisal 58', 71', 85'	Report	Al-Azemi 63', 68'; Al-Nassar 90+4'

Tahnoun bin Mohammed Stadium, Al Ain
Attendance: 627
Referee: Ma Ning (China)
20 May 2015
21:15

Kyrgyzstan	1–3	Pakistan
Otkeev 25'	Report	Hussain 40'; Karipov 55' (o.g.); Khan 88'

Tahnoun bin Mohammed Stadium, Al Ain
Attendance: 165
Referee: Fahad Al-Marri (Qatar)

=== Group C ===
- All matches were held in Iran.
- Times listed were UTC+4:30.

Pos	Team	Pld	W	D	L	GF	GA	GD	Pts	Qualification
1	Saudi Arabia	4	3	1	0	9	1	+8	10	Final tournament
2	Iran (H)	4	3	0	1	15	2	+13	9	Final tournament
3	Palestine	4	2	0	2	6	4	+2	6	
4	Afghanistan	4	1	1	2	2	8	−6	4	
5	Nepal	4	0	0	4	0	17	−17	0	

Source: AFC
Rules for classification: Qualification Tiebreakers
(H) Hosts
23 March 2015
15:00

Afghanistan	0–2	Palestine
	Report	Abu Warda 7'; Qasem 75'

Shahid Dastgerdi Stadium, Tehran
Attendance: 3,500
Referee: Ilgiz Tantashev (Uzbekistan)
23 March 2015
17:00

Nepal	0–5	Iran
	Report	Motahari 14'; Barzay 27' (pen.); Azmoun 54'; Karimi 67'; Saghebi 87'

Azadi Stadium, Tehran
Attendance: 650
Referee: Dmitriy Mashentsev (Kyrgyzstan)

25 March 2015
15:00

Palestine	0–1	Saudi Arabia
	Report	Madu 88' (pen.)

Shahid Dastgerdi Stadium, Tehran
Attendance: 50
Referee: Masoud Tufayelieh (Syria)
25 March 2015
17:00

Afghanistan	2–0	Nepal
Sharif 76'; Hashimi 90+1' (pen.)	Report

Azadi Stadium, Tehran
Attendance: 9,250
Referee: Khamis Al-Marri (Qatar)

27 March 2015
15:00

Saudi Arabia	0–0	Afghanistan
	Report

Shahid Dastgerdi Stadium, Tehran
Attendance: 15,000
Referee: Dmitriy Mashentsev (Kyrgyzstan)
27 March 2015
17:00

Iran	3–0	Palestine
Azmoun 49'; Motahari 80', 90+3' (pen.)	Report

Azadi Stadium, Tehran
Attendance: 550
Referee: Mohammad Abu Loum (Jordan)

29 March 2015
15:00

Nepal	0–6	Saudi Arabia
	Report	Al-Bassas 22'; Al-Nathiri 28', 45'; Al-Saiari 63'; Al-Mousa 77'; Al-Shehri 85'

Shahid Dastgerdi Stadium, Tehran
Attendance: 40
Referee: Mohammad Abu Loum (Jordan)
29 March 2015
17:00

Iran	6–0	Afghanistan
Azmoun 12', 74'; Moradmand 24'; Kamandani 28'; Jahanbakhsh 38'; Cheshmi 61'	Report

Azadi Stadium, Tehran
Attendance: 80,000
Referee: Ilgiz Tantashev (Uzbekistan)

31 March 2015
15:00

Palestine	4–0	Nepal
Maraaba 31', 63'; Zidan 64', 80'	Report

Shahid Dastgerdi Stadium, Tehran
Attendance: 40
Referee: Khamis Al-Marri (Qatar)
31 March 2015
17:00

Saudi Arabia	2–1	Iran
Asiri 70'; Al-Ghamdi 81'	Report	Al-Yami 84' (o.g.)

Azadi Stadium, Tehran
Attendance: 2,000
Referee: Dmitriy Mashentsev (Kyrgyzstan)

=== Group D ===
- All matches were held in United Arab Emirates.
- Times listed were UTC+4.

Pos	Team	Pld	W	D	L	GF	GA	GD	Pts	Qualification
1	United Arab Emirates (H)	3	3	0	0	8	0	+8	9	Final tournament
2	Yemen	3	2	0	1	7	2	+5	6	Final tournament
3	Tajikistan	3	1	0	2	6	6	0	3	
4	Sri Lanka	3	0	0	3	1	14	−13	0	

Source: AFC
Rules for classification: Qualification Tiebreakers
(H) Hosts
27 March 2015
16:45

United Arab Emirates	4–0	Sri Lanka
Mubarak 15'; Saeed 30' (pen.); Gheilani 52'; Roshan 64' (o.g.)	Report

Ittihad Kalba Stadium, Kalba
Attendance: 2,423
Referee: Wang Di (China)
27 March 2015
19:45

Yemen	2–1	Tajikistan
Al-Hagri 21', 78'	Report	Jalilov 61'

Ittihad Kalba Stadium, Kalba
Attendance: 300
Referee: Khamis Al-Kuwari (Qatar)

29 March 2015
16:45

Sri Lanka	0–5	Yemen
	Report	Mahdi 1'; Al-Sarori 14'; Al-Hubaishi 57'; Al-Gabr 65', 90+5'

Ittihad Kalba Stadium, Kalba
Attendance: 200
Referee: Pratap Singh (India)
29 March 2015
19:45

Tajikistan	0–3	United Arab Emirates
	Report	Saeed 14' (pen.); Barman 21'; Gheilani 61'

Ittihad Kalba Stadium, Kalba
Attendance: 1,409
Referee: Jameel Abdulhusin (Bahrain)

31 March 2015
16:45

United Arab Emirates	1–0	Yemen
Rashid 49'	Report

Ittihad Kalba Stadium, Kalba
Attendance: 2,127
Referee: Jameel Abdulhusin (Bahrain)
31 March 2015
19:45

Tajikistan	5–1	Sri Lanka
Umarbaev 37' (pen.); Rakhmatov 46'; Aliev 71'; Rustamov 82'; Ergashev 88'	Report	Zarwan 25'

Ittihad Kalba Stadium, Kalba
Attendance: 150
Referee: Khamis Al-Kuwari (Qatar)

=== Group E ===
- All matches were held in Bangladesh.
- Times listed were UTC+6.

Pos	Team	Pld	W	D	L	GF	GA	GD	Pts	Qualification
1	Syria	3	3	0	0	10	1	+9	9	Final tournament
2	Uzbekistan	3	2	0	1	7	2	+5	6	Final tournament
3	India	3	0	1	2	0	6	−6	1	
4	Bangladesh (H)	3	0	1	2	0	8	−8	1	

Source: AFC
Rules for classification: Qualification Tiebreakers
(H) Hosts
27 March 2015
15:00

Uzbekistan	2–0	India
Sergeev 87'; Kozak 90+2'	Report

Bangabandhu National Stadium, Dhaka
Attendance: 1,000
Referee: Tan Hai (China)
27 March 2015
18:00

Syria	4–0	Bangladesh
Khribin 5', 45+2' (pen.); Al-Baher 15'; Maowas 81'	Report

Bangabandhu National Stadium, Dhaka
Attendance: 5,000
Referee: Mooud Bonyadifar (Iran)

29 March 2015
15:00

India	0–4	Syria
	Report	Maowas 15', 82'; Khribin 45+3', 61'

Bangabandhu National Stadium, Dhaka
Attendance: 400
Referee: Timur Faizullin (Kyrgyzstan)
29 March 2015
18:00

Bangladesh	0–4	Uzbekistan
	Report	Masharipov 4'; Rakhmanov 12', 29'; Makhstaliev 40'

Bangabandhu National Stadium, Dhaka
Attendance: 1,500
Referee: Fahad Al-Mirdasi (Saudi Arabia)

31 March 2015
15:00

Syria	2–1	Uzbekistan
Khribin 29', 45+2' (pen.)	Report	Makhstaliev 59'

Bangabandhu National Stadium, Dhaka
Attendance: 300
Referee: Fahad Al-Mirdasi (Saudi Arabia)
31 March 2015
18:00

India	0–0	Bangladesh
	Report

Bangabandhu National Stadium, Dhaka
Attendance: 5,000
Referee: Mooud Bonyadifar (Iran)

=== Group F ===
- All matches were held in Taiwan.
- Times listed were UTC+8.

Pos	Team	Pld	W	D	L	GF	GA	GD	Pts	Qualification
1	Australia	3	3	0	0	15	1	+14	9	Final tournament
2	Myanmar	3	2	0	1	6	6	0	6	
3	Chinese Taipei (H)	3	1	0	2	3	8	−5	3	
4	Hong Kong	3	0	0	3	2	11	−9	0	

Source: AFC
Rules for classification: Qualification Tiebreakers
(H) Hosts
27 March 2015
16:00

Australia	6–0	Hong Kong
Amini 10'; Pain 21', 79'; Maclaren 76', 90+1', 90+5'	Report

National Stadium, Kaohsiung
Attendance: 300
Referee: Minoru Tōjō (Japan)
27 March 2015
19:00

Myanmar	3–0	Chinese Taipei
Hlaing Bo Bo 26', 69'; Nay Lin Tun 90+3'	Report

National Stadium, Kaohsiung
Attendance: 3,095
Referee: Marai Al-Awaji (Saudi Arabia)

29 March 2015
16:00

Hong Kong	1–2	Myanmar
Leung Nok Hang 32'	Report	Zon Moe Aung 53', 62'

National Stadium, Kaohsiung
Attendance: 350
Referee: Kim Dae-yong (South Korea)
29 March 2015
19:00

Chinese Taipei	0–4	Australia
	Report	Brillante 2'; Taggart 45'; Sotirio 59'; Smith 78'

National Stadium, Kaohsiung
Attendance: 5,000
Referee: Adham Makhadmeh (Jordan)

31 March 2015
16:00

Australia	5–1	Myanmar
Hoole 10', 57', 70'; Maclaren 13', 68'	Report	Kaung Sat Naing 78'

National Stadium, Kaohsiung
Attendance: 200
Referee: Marai Al-Awaji (Saudi Arabia)
31 March 2015
19:00

Chinese Taipei	3–1	Hong Kong
Ko Yu-ting 27'; Wen Chih-hao 42'; Wei Yu-jen 57'	Report	Leung Ka Hai 85'

National Stadium, Kaohsiung
Attendance: 3,340
Referee: Minoru Tōjō (Japan)

=== Group G ===
- All matches were held in Thailand.
- Times listed were UTC+7.

Pos	Team	Pld	W	D	L	GF	GA	GD	Pts	Qualification
1	North Korea	3	2	1	0	8	1	+7	7	Final tournament
2	Thailand (H)	3	2	1	0	7	2	+5	7	Final tournament
3	Cambodia	3	1	0	2	5	7	−2	3	
4	Philippines	3	0	0	3	2	12	−10	0	

Source: AFC
Rules for classification: Qualification Tiebreakers
(H) Hosts
27 March 2015
16:00

North Korea	4–0	Philippines
Ri Hyong-jin 17'; So Kyong-jin 45+1' (pen.); Jang Ok-chol 62'; Pak Hyon-il 80'	Report

Rajamangala Stadium, Bangkok
Attendance: 800
Referee: Yousef Al-Marzouq (Kuwait)
27 March 2015
19:00

Thailand	2–1	Cambodia
Pinyo 57'; Chenrop 90+5'	Report	Udom 12'

Rajamangala Stadium, Bangkok
Attendance: 3,000
Referee: Fu Ming (China)

29 March 2015
16:00

Cambodia	1–4	North Korea
Matnorotin 84'	Report	Ho Myong-chol 17'; Kim Ju-song 38'; Jo Kwang 56'; Jang Kuk-chol 69'

Rajamangala Stadium, Bangkok
Attendance: 2,000
Referee: Çarymyrat Gurbanow (Turkmenistan)
29 March 2015
19:00

Philippines	1–5	Thailand
Salenga 89'	Report	Kasidech 12'; Pakorn 47' (pen.); Chenrop 56'; Chaowat 62'; Pinyo 67'

Rajamangala Stadium, Bangkok
Attendance: 6,000
Referee: Yousef Al-Marzouq (Kuwait)

31 March 2015
16:00

Cambodia	3–1	Philippines
Vathanaka 5', 10'; Visal 16'	Report	Arboleda 90+2'

Rajamangala Stadium, Bangkok
Attendance: 1,000
Referee: Fu Ming (China)
31 March 2015
19:00

North Korea	0–0	Thailand
	Report

Rajamangala Stadium, Bangkok
Attendance: 20,000
Referee: Çarymyrat Gurbanow (Turkmenistan)

=== Group H ===
- All matches were held in Indonesia.
- Times listed were UTC+7.

Pos	Team	Pld	W	D	L	GF	GA	GD	Pts	Qualification
1	South Korea	3	3	0	0	12	0	+12	9	Final tournament
2	Indonesia (H)	3	2	0	1	7	4	+3	6	
3	Timor-Leste	3	1	0	2	3	8	−5	3	
4	Brunei	3	0	0	3	0	10	−10	0	

Source: AFC
Rules for classification: Qualification Tiebreakers
(H) Hosts
27 March 2015
15:30

South Korea	5–0	Brunei
Lee Yong-jae 3'; Jung Seung-hyun 29'; Kim Hyun 39' (pen.); Kwon Chang-hoon 57' (pen.); Jang Hyun-soo 76'	Report

Gelora Bung Karno Stadium, Jakarta
Attendance: 600
Referee: Jumpei Iida (Japan)
27 March 2015
19:00

Indonesia	5–0	Timor-Leste
Adam 17'; Manahati 45+1' (pen.); Evan 51'; Muchlis 66'; Hansamu 86'	Report

Gelora Bung Karno Stadium, Jakarta
Attendance: 3,412
Referee: Mohammed Abdulla Hassan Mohamed (United Arab Emirates)

29 March 2015
15:30

Brunei	0–2	Indonesia
	Report	Dani 70'; Muchlis 87'

Gelora Bung Karno Stadium, Jakarta
Attendance: 6,454
Referee: Aziz Asimov (Uzbekistan)
29 March 2015
19:00

Timor-Leste	0–3	South Korea
	Report	Moon Chang-jin 17' (pen.), 47'; Kim Seung-jun 44'

Gelora Bung Karno Stadium, Jakarta
Attendance: 555
Referee: Sivakorn Pu-Udom (Thailand)

31 March 2015
15:30

South Korea	4–0	Indonesia
Jung Seung-hyun 52'; Lee Chan-dong 71'; Kim Seung-jun 83'; Lee Chang-min 87'	Report

Gelora Bung Karno Stadium, Jakarta
Attendance: 16,422
Referee: Mohammed Abdulla Hassan Mohamed (United Arab Emirates)
31 March 2015
19:00

Timor-Leste	3–0	Brunei
Fernandes 24'; Cruz 90'; Agostinho 90+3'	Report

Gelora Bung Karno Stadium, Jakarta
Attendance: 137
Referee: Sivakorn Pu-Udom (Thailand)

=== Group I ===
- All matches were held in Malaysia.
- Times listed were UTC+8.

Pos	Team	Pld	W	D	L	GF	GA	GD	Pts	Qualification
1	Japan	3	3	0	0	10	0	+10	9	Final tournament
2	Vietnam	3	2	0	1	9	3	+6	6	Final tournament
3	Malaysia (H)	3	1	0	2	3	3	0	3	
4	Macau	3	0	0	3	0	16	−16	0	

Source: AFC
Rules for classification: Qualification Tiebreakers
(H) Hosts
27 March 2015
16:00

Japan	7–0	Macau
Endo 22'; Toyokawa 26'; Notsuda 31', 90+2'; Tang Hou Fai 33' (o.g.); Suzuki 66'; Minamino 90+3'	Report

Shah Alam Stadium, Shah Alam
Attendance: 335
Referee: Khurram Shahzad (Pakistan)
27 March 2015
20:45

Malaysia	1–2	Vietnam
Naim 34'	Report	Võ Huy Toàn 38'; Nguyễn Công Phượng 44'

Shah Alam Stadium, Shah Alam
Attendance: 2,145
Referee: Chris Beath (Australia)

29 March 2015
16:30

Macau	0–2	Malaysia
	Report	Syahrul 12' (pen.); Amirzafran 67'

Shah Alam Stadium, Shah Alam
Attendance: 780
Referee: Rowan Arumughan (India)
29 March 2015
20:15

Vietnam	0–2	Japan
	Report	Nakajima 43', 90+3'

Shah Alam Stadium, Shah Alam
Attendance: 1,645
Referee: Mohanad Qasim Eesee Sarray (Iraq)

31 March 2015
17:00

Vietnam	7–0	Macau
Hồ Ngọc Thắng 3'; Lê Thanh Bình 5', 21', 43'; Nguyễn Công Phượng 19', 45+1' (pen.), 90+3'	Report

Shah Alam Stadium, Shah Alam
Attendance: 490
Referee: Khurram Shahzad (Pakistan)
31 March 2015
20:45

Japan	1–0	Malaysia
Kubo 41'	Report

Shah Alam Stadium, Shah Alam
Attendance: 1,766
Referee: Chris Beath (Australia)

=== Group J ===
- All matches were held in Laos.
- Times listed were UTC+7.

Pos	Team	Pld	W	D	L	GF	GA	GD	Pts	Qualification
1	China	3	3	0	0	13	0	+13	9	Final tournament
2	Laos (H)	3	1	1	1	7	3	+4	4	
3	Singapore	3	0	2	1	2	7	−5	2	
4	Mongolia	3	0	1	2	2	14	−12	1	

Source: AFC
Rules for classification: Qualification Tiebreakers
(H) Hosts
27 March 2015
16:00

China	5–0	Mongolia
Wu Xinghan 3'; Xie Pengfei 24'; Xu Xin 39' (pen.); Chen Hao 60', 78'	Report

New Laos National Stadium, Vientiane
Attendance: 1,200
Referee: Ali Shaban (Kuwait)
27 March 2015
19:00

Laos	0–0	Singapore
	Report

New Laos National Stadium, Vientiane
Attendance: 2,000
Referee: Kim Hee-gon (South Korea)

29 March 2015
16:00

Singapore	0–5	China
	Report	Li Yuanyi 2'; Feng Gang 39'; Xu Xin 58' (pen.); Zang Yifeng 66'; Wu Xinghan 79'

New Laos National Stadium, Vientiane
Attendance: 1,500
Referee: Omar Mubarak Al-Yaqoubi (Oman)
29 March 2015
19:00

Mongolia	0–7	Laos
	Report	Sihavong 32'; Khanthavong 45', 60'; Bounmalay 63'; Khochalern 68'; Kettavong 84'; Natphasouk 87'

New Laos National Stadium, Vientiane
Attendance: 2,192
Referee: Hiroyuki Kimura (Japan)

31 March 2015
16:00

Singapore	2–2	Mongolia
Irfan 18', 59'	Report	Tsogtbaatar 8'; Erdenebat 45+1'

New Laos National Stadium, Vientiane
Attendance: 400
Referee: Kim Hee-gon (South Korea)
31 March 2015
19:00

China	3–0	Laos
Feng Gang 17'; Xie Pengfei 53'; Guo Hao 77'	Report

New Laos National Stadium, Vientiane
Attendance: 5,000
Referee: Hiroyuki Kimura (Japan)

== Ranking of second-placed teams ==
In order to ensure equality when comparing the runner-up team of all groups, the results of the matches against the 5th-placed team in Groups A and C were ignored due to the other groups having only four teams.

The best runner-up teams among those ranked second in the groups were determined as follows:

1. Greater number of points obtained from group matches identified by AFC;
2. Goal difference resulting from group matches identified by AFC;
3. Greater number of goals scored in group matches identified by AFC;
4. Greater number of wins in group matches identified by AFC;
5. Fewer score calculated according to the number of yellow and red cards received in group matches identified by AFC (1 point for a single yellow card, 3 points for a red card as a consequence of two yellow cards, 3 points for a direct red card, 4 points for a yellow card followed by a direct red card);
6. Drawing of lots.

Pos	Grp	Team	Pld	W	D	L	GF	GA	GD	Pts	Qualification
1	G	Thailand	3	2	1	0	7	2	+5	7	Final tournament
2	C	Iran	3	2	0	1	10	2	+8	6	Final tournament
3	I	Vietnam	3	2	0	1	9	3	+6	6	Final tournament
4	D	Yemen	3	2	0	1	7	2	+5	6 (Note: Yemen and Uzbekistan are ranked by disciplinary points.)	Final tournament
5	E	Uzbekistan	3	2	0	1	7	2	+5	6	Final tournament
6	H	Indonesia	3	2	0	1	7	4	+3	6	
7	F	Myanmar	3	2	0	1	6	6	0	6	
8	A	Oman	3	1	2	0	7	3	+4	5	
9	B	Kuwait	3	1	2	0	5	3	+2	5	
10	J	Laos	3	1	1	1	7	3	+4	4	

Source: AFC

== Qualified teams ==
The following 16 teams qualified for the final tournament.

Team	Qualified as	Qualified on	Previous appearances in tournament^{2}
Qatar	Hosts	28 November 2014	0 (debut)
Iraq	Group A winners	31 March 2015	1 (**2013**)
Jordan	Group B winners	20 May 2015	1 (2013)
Saudi Arabia	Group C winners	31 March 2015	1 (2013)
United Arab Emirates	Group D winners	31 March 2015	1 (2013)
Syria	Group E winners	31 March 2015	1 (2013)
Australia	Group F winners	31 March 2015	1 (2013)
North Korea	Group G winners	31 March 2015	1 (2013)
South Korea	Group H winners	31 March 2015	1 (2013)
Japan	Group I winners	31 March 2015	1 (2013)
China	Group J winners	31 March 2015	1 (2013)
Thailand	1st best runners-up	31 March 2015	0 (debut)
Iran	2nd best runners-up	31 March 2015	1 (2013)
Vietnam	3rd best runners-up	31 March 2015	0 (debut)
Yemen	4th best runners-up	31 March 2015	1 (2013)
Uzbekistan	5th best runners-up	20 May 2015	1 (2013)

^{2} Bold indicates champion for that year. Italic indicates host for that year.

== Goalscorers ==
6 goals

- (Syria) Omar Khribin

5 goals

- (Australia) Jamie Maclaren

4 goals

- (Iran) Sardar Azmoun
- (Iraq) Mahdi Kamel
- (Iraq) Amjad Waleed
- (Jordan) Baha' Faisal
- (Kuwait) Faisal Al-Azemi
- (Oman) Saud Al-Farsi
- (Vietnam) Nguyễn Công Phượng

3 goals

- (Australia) Andrew Hoole
- (Iran) Amir Arsalan Motahari
- (Jordan) Mahmoud Al-Mardi
- (Oman) Hatem Al-Hamhami
- (Syria) Mahmoud Maowas
- (Vietnam) Lê Thanh Bình

2 goals

- (Australia) Connor Pain
- (Bahrain) Komail Al-Aswad
- (Cambodia) Chan Vathanaka
- (China) Chen Hao
- (China) Feng Gang
- (China) Wu Xinghan
- (China) Xie Pengfei
- (China) Xu Xin
- (Indonesia) Muchlis Hadi
- (Iraq) Ayman Hussein
- (Iraq) Bashar Rasan
- (Japan) Shoya Nakajima
- (Japan) Gakuto Notsuda
- (Jordan) Laith Al-Bashtawi
- (Jordan) Saleh Rateb
- (South Korea) Jeong Seung-hyun
- (South Korea) Kim Seung-jun
- (South Korea) Moon Chang-jin
- (Laos) Sitthideth Khanthavong
- (Lebanon) Alexis Khazzaka
- (Myanmar) Hlaing Bo Bo
- (Myanmar) Zon Moe Aung
- (Palestine) Mohammed Maraaba
- (Palestine) Fadi Zidan
- (Saudi Arabia) Ahmed Al-Nathiri
- (Singapore) Irfan Fandi
- (Thailand) Pinyo Inpinit
- (Thailand) Chenrop Samphaodi
- (United Arab Emirates) Ahmed Rabia Gheilani
- (United Arab Emirates) Yousif Saeed
- (Uzbekistan) Abbosbek Makhsatalliev
- (Uzbekistan) Sardor Rakhmanov
- (Yemen) Yaser Ali Al-Gabr
- (Yemen) Ayman Al-Hagri

1 goal

- (Afghanistan) Sayed Mohammad Hashimi
- (Afghanistan) Khalid Ahmad Sharif
- (Australia) Mustafa Amini
- (Australia) Joshua Brillante
- (Australia) Brad Smith
- (Australia) Jaushua Sotirio
- (Australia) Adam Taggart
- (Bahrain) Abdullah Al-Ajmi
- (Bahrain) Ali Madan
- (Cambodia) Sary Matnorotin
- (Cambodia) Prak Mony Udom
- (Cambodia) Soeuy Visal
- (China) Guo Hao
- (China) Li Yuanyi
- (China) Zang Yifeng
- (Chinese Taipei) Ko Yu-ting
- (Chinese Taipei) Wei Yu-jen
- (Chinese Taipei) Wen Chih-hao
- (Hong Kong) Leung Ka Hai
- (Hong Kong) Leung Nok Hang
- (Indonesia) Evan Dimas
- (Indonesia) Manahati Lestusen
- (Indonesia) Ahmad Nufiandani
- (Indonesia) Adam Alis
- (Indonesia) Hansamu Yama
- (Iran) Behnam Barzay
- (Iran) Roozbeh Cheshmi
- (Iran) Alireza Jahanbakhsh
- (Iran) Milad Kamandani
- (Iran) Ali Karimi
- (Iran) Mohammad Hossein Moradmand
- (Iran) Shahin Saghebi
- (Iraq) Ali Hisni
- (Iraq) Abdul-Qadir Tariq
- (Japan) Wataru Endo
- (Japan) Yuya Kubo
- (Japan) Takumi Minamino
- (Japan) Musashi Suzuki
- (Japan) Yuta Toyokawa
- (Jordan) Feras Shelbaieh
- (North Korea) Ho Myong-chol
- (North Korea) Jang Kuk-chol
- (North Korea) Jang Ok-chol
- (North Korea) Jo Kwang
- (North Korea) Kim Ju-song
- (North Korea) Pak Hyon-il
- (North Korea) Ri Hyong-jin
- (North Korea) So Kyong-jin
- (South Korea) Jang Hyun-soo
- (South Korea) Kim Hyun
- (South Korea) Kwon Chang-hoon
- (South Korea) Lee Chan-dong
- (South Korea) Lee Chang-min
- (South Korea) Lee Yong-jae
- (Kuwait) Mohammad Al-Nassar
- (Kyrgyzstan) Avazbek Otkeev
- (Laos) Tiny Bounmalay
- (Laos) Armisay Kettavong
- (Laos) Phoutthasay Khochalern
- (Laos) Soukchinda Natphasouk
- (Laos) Khonesavanh Sihavong
- (Lebanon) Mahmoud Siblini
- (Malaysia) Nazirul Naim Che Hashim
- (Malaysia) Syahrul Azwari Ibrahim
- (Malaysia) Wan Ahmad Amirzafran Wan Nadris
- (Maldives) Mohamed Irufaan
- (Maldives) Hamza Mohamed
- (Mongolia) Purevdorj Erdenebat
- (Mongolia) Mungunshagai Tsogtbaatar
- (Oman) Ishad Obaid Al-Abdul Salam
- (Oman) Omar Al-Fazari
- (Oman) Anwar Al-Hinai
- (Oman) Omar Al-Malki
- (Oman) Ahmed Al-Siyabi
- (Myanmar) Kaung Sat Naing
- (Myanmar) Nay Lin Tun
- (Pakistan) Saddam Hussain
- (Pakistan) Mansoor Khan
- (Palestine) Mahmoud Abu Warda
- (Palestine) Mahmoud Shaikh Qasem
- (Philippines) Fitch Arboleda
- (Philippines) Paolo Salenga
- (Saudi Arabia) Mustafa Al-Bassas
- (Saudi Arabia) Abdulrahman Al-Ghamdi
- (Saudi Arabia) Ryan Al-Mousa
- (Saudi Arabia) Mohammed Al-Saiari
- (Saudi Arabia) Saleh Al-Shehri
- (Saudi Arabia) Abdulfattah Asiri
- (Saudi Arabia) Abdullah Madu
- (Syria) Mahmood Al-Baher
- (Sri Lanka) Zohar Mohamed Zarwan
- (Tajikistan) Jahongir Aliev
- (Tajikistan) Jahongir Ergashev
- (Tajikistan) Romish Jalilov
- (Tajikistan) Firuz Rakhmatov
- (Tajikistan) Navruz Rustamov
- (Tajikistan) Parvizdzhon Umarbaev
- (Thailand) Pakorn Prempak
- (Thailand) Kasidech Wettayawong
- (Thailand) Chaowat Veerachat
- (Timor-Leste) Agostinho
- (Timor-Leste) Ezequiel Fernandes
- (Timor-Leste) Henrique Cruz
- (United Arab Emirates) Ahmed Barman
- (United Arab Emirates) Khalfan Mubarak
- (United Arab Emirates) Saif Rashid
- (Uzbekistan) Vladimir Kozak
- (Uzbekistan) Jaloliddin Masharipov
- (Uzbekistan) Igor Sergeev
- (Vietnam) Hồ Ngọc Thắng
- (Vietnam) Võ Huy Toàn
- (Yemen) Waleed Al-Hubaishi
- (Yemen) Mohammed Al-Sarori
- (Yemen) Ala Addin Mahdi

1 own goal

- (Kyrgyzstan) Manas Karipov (playing against Pakistan)
- (Macau) Tang Hou Fai (playing against Japan)
- (Oman) Nadir Mabrook (playing against Iraq)
- (Saudi Arabia) Saeed Awadh Al-Yami (playing against Iran)
- (Sri Lanka) Sunil Roshan (playing against United Arab Emirates)

Source: The-AFC.com
