= 2016 AFC Futsal Championship qualification =

Tournament details
- Host countries: Malaysia (West); Thailand (ASEAN); Tajikistan (Central); Mongolia (East)
- Dates: 1–3 October 2015 (West); 8–16 October 2015 (ASEAN); 14–16 November 2015 (Central); 14–19 November 2015 (East)
- Teams: 26 (from 1 confederation)

Tournament statistics
- Matches played: 49
- Goals scored: 414 (8.45 per match)
- Attendance: 78,651 (1,605 per match)
- Top scorer(s): (Jordan) Ahmed Abdelalrhman (West) (4 goals) (Australia) Daniel Fogarty (Thailand) Jetsada Chudech (ASEAN) (12 goals each) (Afghanistan) Akbar Kazemi (Central) (4 goals) (South Korea) Oh Hyun-jong (East) (8 goals)

The 2016 AFC Futsal Championship qualification was a men's futsal competition which decided the participating teams of the 2016 AFC Futsal Championship. A total of 16 teams qualified to play in the final tournament, including Japan, Iran, Uzbekistan (hosts), who qualified directly as the top three finishers of the 2014 AFC Futsal Championship. Since third-placed Uzbekistan qualified automatically as hosts, Kuwait, who finished fourth, would have also qualified as the next best-ranked team, but they were later replaced due to FIFA's suspension of the Kuwait Football Association.

The top five teams of the final tournament qualified for the 2016 FIFA Futsal World Cup in Colombia.

== Teams ==
A total of 26 AFC member national teams entered the qualifying stage, split into zones according to their regional affiliations.

- West Asia had seven entrants, where they were drawn into one group of four teams and one group of three teams.
- Central Asia had four entrants, where they were all placed in one group.
- South Asia had no entrants.
- ASEAN had ten entrants, with the 2015 AFF Futsal Championship doubling as the ASEAN qualifiers, where they were drawn into two groups of five teams.
- East Asia had five entrants, where they were all placed in one group.

The draw for the qualifiers was held on 2 September 2015 at the AFC House in Kuala Lumpur, Malaysia. Only the groups in West Asia were drawn, as no draw was necessary for Central Asia and East Asia, and the draw for the 2015 AFF Futsal Championship had already been held on 16 June 2015 in Singapore.

Apart from the four direct qualifiers, the remaining twelve slots in the final tournament were allocated as follows:

- Each zone (except South Asia) was allocated a minimum of two slots.
- Additional slots were allocated based on the technical standard team ranking from fourth to seventh placing in the 2014 AFC Futsal Championship, with West Asia (4th and 7th) and ASEAN (5th and 6th) each allocated two additional slots.

	Slots + Direct qualifiers	Teams entering qualification	Did not enter
West Zone	4 slots + Kuwait^{1}	Bahrain; Iraq; Jordan; Lebanon; Qatar; Saudi Arabia; United Arab Emirates	Oman; Palestine (withdrew); Syria; Yemen
Central Zone	2 slots + Iran + Uzbekistan	Afghanistan; Kyrgyzstan; Tajikistan; Turkmenistan	None
South Zone	0 slots	None	Bangladesh; Bhutan; India; Maldives; Nepal; Pakistan; Sri Lanka
ASEAN Zone	4 slots	Australia; Brunei; Laos; Malaysia; Myanmar; Philippines; Singapore; Thailand; Timor-Leste; Vietnam	Cambodia; Indonesia (suspended by FIFA)
East Zone	2 slots + Japan	China; Chinese Taipei; Hong Kong; Mongolia; South Korea	Guam; Macau (forgot sign up); North Korea; Northern Mariana Islands^{2}

Notes
^{1} Later replaced by the next best team from the West Zone qualifiers due to FIFA's suspension of the Kuwait Football Association.
^{2} Non-FIFA member, ineligible for World Cup.

== Format ==
In each group, teams played each other once at a centralised venue. The top two teams of each group (total 12 teams) qualified for the final tournament.

=== Tiebreakers ===
The teams were ranked according to points (3 points for a win, 1 point for a draw, 0 points for a loss). If tied on points, tiebreakers would be applied in the following order:

1. Greater number of points obtained in the group matches between the teams concerned;
2. Goal difference resulting from the group matches between the teams concerned;
3. Greater number of goals scored in the group matches between the teams concerned;
4. If, after applying criteria 1 to 3, teams still have an equal ranking, criteria 1 to 3 are reapplied exclusively to the matches between the teams in question to determine their final rankings. If this procedure does not lead to a decision, criteria 5 to 9 apply;
5. Goal difference in all the group matches;
6. Greater number of goals scored in all the group matches;
7. Penalty shoot-out if only two teams are involved and they are both on the field of play;
8. Fewer score calculated according to the number of yellow and red cards received in the group matches (1 point for a single yellow card, 3 points for a red card as a consequence of two yellow cards, 3 points for a direct red card, 4 points for a yellow card followed by a direct red card);
9. Drawing of lots.

== Zones ==
The matches were played on the following dates:

- West Zone: 1–3 October 2015
- ASEAN Zone: 8–16 October 2015
- Central Zone: 14–16 November 2015
- East Zone: 14–19 November 2015

=== West Zone ===
- For the draw, the teams were seeded according to their performance in the previous season in 2014.
  - Pot 1: Iraq, Lebanon
  - Pot 2: Qatar, Saudi Arabia
  - Pot 3: Bahrain, United Arab Emirates
  - Pot 4: Jordan
- All matches were held in Malaysia.
- Times listed were UTC+8.

==== Group A ====
Pos	Team	Pld	W	D	L	GF	GA	GD	Pts	Qualification
1	Lebanon	3	3	0	0	16	6	+10	9	2016 AFC Futsal Championship
2	Jordan	3	2	0	1	11	8	+3	6	2016 AFC Futsal Championship
3	Saudi Arabia	3	0	1	2	4	9	−5	1	2016 AFC Futsal Championship (Note: The AFC Executive Committee ratified on 13 November 2015 that due to FIFA's suspension of the Kuwait Football Association, Saudi Arabia, the next best team from the West Zone qualifiers, would replace Kuwait in the 2016 AFC Futsal Championship.)
4	Bahrain	3	0	1	2	7	15	−8	1	

Source: AFC
Rules for classification: Qualification tiebreakers
Notes:
1 October 2015
16:30

Saudi Arabia	2–2	Bahrain
Atiah 14'; Abdulrazaq 17' (o.g.)	Report	Abdulrazaq 39'; Al-Chuban 40'

Nilai Indoor Stadium, Nilai
Attendance: 100
Referee: Chris Colley (Australia)
1 October 2015
19:00

Lebanon	5–2	Jordan
Zeid 1'; Kobeissy 25'; Zeitoun 40'; Homsi 40'; Elias 40'	Report	Abdelalrhman 10', 18'

Nilai Indoor Stadium, Nilai
Attendance: 100
Referee: Mahmoud Reza Nasirloo (Iran)

2 October 2015
16:30

Saudi Arabia	0–2	Jordan
	Report	Abdallah 21'; Abdelalrhman 30'

Nilai Indoor Stadium, Nilai
Attendance: 100
Referee: Trương Quốc Dũng (Vietnam)
2 October 2015
19:00

Bahrain	2–6	Lebanon
Abdulla 9'; Mula 24'	Report	Tneich 1', 6', 15'; El Dine 17'; Kobeissy 32'; Serhan 39'

Nilai Indoor Stadium, Nilai
Attendance: 100
Referee: Maiket Yuttakon (Thailand)

3 October 2015
16:30

Jordan	7–3	Bahrain
Nadi 3', 22'; Abdelalrhman 22'; Atef 25'; Waleed 32'; Abed 34'; Abdallah 34'	Report	Abbas 25', 27'; Abdulrazaq 36'

Nilai Indoor Stadium, Nilai
Attendance: 100
Referee: Helday Idang (Malaysia)
3 October 2015
19:00

Lebanon	5–2	Saudi Arabia
Zeitoun 9', 38'; Rmaiti 28'; Ossman 28'; Serhan 34'	Report	Zafer 15'; Azmi 32'

Nilai Indoor Stadium, Nilai
Attendance: 100
Referee: An Ran (China)

==== Group B ====
Pos	Team	Pld	W	D	L	GF	GA	GD	Pts	Qualification
1	Qatar	2	2	0	0	4	2	+2	6	2016 AFC Futsal Championship
2	Iraq	2	1	0	1	4	3	+1	3	2016 AFC Futsal Championship
3	United Arab Emirates	2	0	0	2	2	5	−3	0	

Source: AFC
Rules for classification: Qualification tiebreakers
1 October 2015
14:00

United Arab Emirates	1–3	Iraq
Obaid 31'	Report	Hasan 10', 22'; Mustafa 35'

Nilai Indoor Stadium, Nilai
Attendance: 100
Referee: Rey Ritaga (Philippines)

2 October 2015
14:00

Qatar	2–1	United Arab Emirates
Oliveira 9'; Rocha 37'	Report	Obaid 36'

Nilai Indoor Stadium, Nilai
Attendance: 100
Referee: An Ran (China)

3 October 2015
14:00

Iraq	1–2	Qatar
Salim 35'	Report	Oliveira 26', 38'

Nilai Indoor Stadium, Nilai
Attendance: 100
Referee: Lee Po-fu (Chinese Taipei)

=== ASEAN Zone ===
- All matches were held in Thailand. The tournament was originally to be held in Indonesia before the suspension of its football association.
- Times listed were UTC+7.

==== Group A ====
Pos	Team	Pld	W	D	L	GF	GA	GD	Pts	Qualification
1	Thailand (H)	4	4	0	0	42	5	+37	12	Knockout stage and 2016 AFC Futsal Championship
2	Malaysia	4	3	0	1	22	9	+13	9	Knockout stage and 2016 AFC Futsal Championship
3	Timor-Leste	4	2	0	2	16	31	−15	6	
4	Brunei	4	1	0	3	10	28	−18	3	
5	Singapore	4	0	0	4	4	21	−17	0	

Source: AFC & AFF
Rules for classification: Qualification tiebreakers
(H) Hosts
8 October 2015
16:30

Timor-Leste	6–3	Singapore
Sarmento 8', 23', 24', 28'; Machel 31'; José Vide 39'	Report AFC; Report Asean	Amir 2', 18'; Helmi 22'

Bangkok Arena, Bangkok
Attendance: 200
Referee: Hiroyuki Kobayashi (Japan)
8 October 2015
19:00

Brunei	1–9	Malaysia
Faizul 9'	Report AFC; Report Asean	Fawzul 1', 12', 25', 25'; Yamin 6' (o.g.); Fitri 11'; Aizad 26'; Akmarulnizam 28' (pen.); Nizam 30'

Bangkok Arena, Bangkok
Attendance: 400
Referee: Ali Reza Sohrabi Balsini (Iran)

9 October 2015
16:30

Timor-Leste	6–5	Brunei
Guterres 12'; Sarmento 15', 24', 30'; José Vide 25', 37'	Report AFC; Report Asean	Azizan 2'; Faiz 28', 34'; Faizul 30', 36'

Bangkok Arena, Bangkok
Attendance: 3,000
Referee: Vahid Arzpeyma Mohamareh (Iran)
9 October 2015
19:00

Singapore	0–8	Thailand
	Report AFC; Report Asean	Jetsada 1', 26'; Suphawut 5'; Kritsada 8', 19', 35'; Piyapan 34'; Nattawut 38'

Bangkok Arena, Bangkok
Attendance: 6,000
Referee: Hawkar Salar Ahmed (Iraq)

10 October 2015
16:30

Singapore	1–2	Brunei
Farhan 12'	Report AFC; Report Asean	Faiz 23', 37'

Bangkok Arena, Bangkok
Attendance: 700
Referee: Husein Mahmoud Khalaileh (Jordan)
10 October 2015
19:00

Thailand	6–1	Malaysia
Piyapan 10'; Jetsada 13'; Chaiwat 15'; Sorasak 23'; Nattawut 36'; Kritsada 37'	Report AFC; Report Asean	Khairul Effendy 39'

Bangkok Arena, Bangkok
Attendance: 5,500
Referee: Hasan Mohammed Al-Gburi (Iraq)

11 October 2015
16:30

Malaysia	7–2	Timor-Leste
Akmarulnizam 1'; Fitri 12', 22'; Ivan 17' (o.g.); Nizam 34'; Aula 37'; Fawzul 39'	Report AFC; Report Asean	Machel 18'; Remigio Duarte 22'

Bangkok Arena, Bangkok
Attendance: 1,500
Referee: Khamis Hassan Alshamsi (United Arab Emirates)
11 October 2015
19:00

Brunei	2–12	Thailand
Maziri 26'; Azizan 38'	Report AFC; Report Asean	Kritsada 1'; Konghla 5'; Jetsada 8', 15', 16', 39'; Ampol 10'; Suphawut 14', 25', 35'; Jirawat 29'; Sorasak 39'

Bangkok Arena, Bangkok
Attendance: 5,000
Referee: Tomohiro Kozaki (Japan)

12 October 2015
16:30

Singapore	0–5	Malaysia
	Report AFC; Report Asean	Yazadh 9'; Aizad 22'; Aula 38'; Yi Long 38' (o.g.); Fawzul 40'

Bangkok Arena, Bangkok
Attendance: 500
Referee: Hiroyuki Kobayashi (Japan)
12 October 2015
19:00

Thailand	16–2	Timor-Leste
Sorasak 4'; Jetsada 5', 5', 37', 40'; Suphawut 18', 29', 34', 35'; Wanlop 20', 40', 40'; Warut 22', 33'; Piyanat 27'; Nattawut 37'	Report AFC; Report Asean	Sarmento 15'; José Vide 19'

Bangkok Arena, Bangkok
Attendance: 4,000
Referee: Vahid Arzpeyma Mohamareh (Iran)

==== Group B ====
Pos	Team	Pld	W	D	L	GF	GA	GD	Pts	Qualification
1	Australia	4	4	0	0	37	8	+29	12	Knockout stage and 2016 AFC Futsal Championship
2	Vietnam	4	3	0	1	39	9	+30	9	Knockout stage and 2016 AFC Futsal Championship
3	Myanmar	4	2	0	2	27	9	+18	6	
4	Laos	4	1	0	3	17	43	−26	3	
5	Philippines	4	0	0	4	4	55	−51	0	

Source: AFC & AFF
Rules for classification: Qualification tiebreakers
8 October 2015
11:30

Laos	1–13	Vietnam
Oley 7'	Report AFC; Report Asean	Lê Quốc Nam 3'; Mai Thành Đạt 8', 32'; Trần Long Vũ 9', 38'; Phùng Trọng Luân 9', 35'; Nguyễn Minh Trí 11'; Nguyễn Bảo Quân 11'; Ngô Ngọc Sơn 14'; Danh Phát 19'; Trần Văn Vũ 23'; Dương Anh Tùng 38'

Bangkok Arena, Bangkok
Attendance: 200
Referee: Liu Jianqiao (China)
8 October 2015
14:00

Philippines	0–13	Myanmar
	Report AFC; Report Asean	Nyein Min Soe 3'; Kyaw Soe Moe 10', 12'; Naing Ye Kyaw 11', 22', 25'; Htet Myat Naing 13', 30'; Pyae Phyo Maung 17'; Aung Zin Oo 18'; Pyae Phyo Maung 33'; Ye Yint Oo 36'; Khin Zaw Lin 37'

Bangkok Arena, Bangkok
Attendance: 250
Referee: Khamis Hassan Alshamsi (United Arab Emirates)

9 October 2015
11:30

Myanmar	1–3	Australia
Khin Zaw Lin 22'	Report AFC; Report Asean	Fogarty 10'; W. Giovenali 14', 15'

Bangkok Arena, Bangkok
Attendance: 150
Referee: Lee Po-fu (Chinese Taipei)
9 October 2015
14:00

Philippines	3–10	Laos
Pasilan 16', 36'; Mabanag 37'	Report AFC; Report Asean	Champathong 6'; Phasawaeng 6', 36'; Keomanixay 9', 24'; Phiphakkhavong 16', 16', 31'; Nonmany 18'; Chanchaleune 25'

Bangkok Arena, Bangkok
Attendance: 300
Referee: Abdulrahman Abdulqader Abdulla (Bahrain)

10 October 2015
11:30

Australia	13–0	Philippines
Niski 6', 7', 23'; Basger 13', 35'; Lockhart 15', 16', 24'; W. Giovenali 19'; Cooper 19', 29'; Adeli 30'; Seeto 37'	Report AFC; Report Asean

Bangkok Arena, Bangkok
Attendance: 100
Referee: Tomohiro Kozaki (Japan)
10 October 2015
14:00

Vietnam	2–1	Myanmar
Trần Văn Vũ 9', 28'	Report AFC; Report Asean	Pyae Phyo Maung 24'

Bangkok Arena, Bangkok
Attendance: 300
Referee: Zhang Youze (China)

11 October 2015
11:30

Philippines	1–19	Vietnam
Hermosa 25'	Report AFC; Report Asean	Phạm Đức Hòa 7', 17', 25'; Dương Anh Tùng 11'; Lê Quốc Nam 21', 27'; Nguyễn Minh Trí 21', 31'; Nguyễn Bảo Quân 21', 31', 32'; Yuhico 23' (o.g.); Ngô Ngọc Sơn 27'; Vũ Xuân Du 28', 30'; Trần Văn Vũ 34'; Trần Long Vũ 36'; Phùng Trọng Luân 36'; Danh Phát 40'

Bangkok Arena, Bangkok
Attendance: 100
Referee: Liu Jianqiao (China)
11 October 2015
14:00

Laos	2–15	Australia
Keomanixay 29'; Phasawaeng 39'	Report AFC; Report Asean	Adeli 1', 13'; Fogarty 3', 23', 23', 40'; Basger 6', 12', 13'; G. Giovenali 16', 30'; Kelshaw 28', 29'; Lockhart 36', 37'

Bangkok Arena, Bangkok
Attendance: 250
Referee: Lee Po-fu (Chinese Taipei)

12 October 2015
11:30

Myanmar	12–4	Laos
Nyein Min Soe 6', 37'; Htet Myat Naing 15', 22', 34'; Aung Aung 16', 17', 23'; Khin Zaw Lin 18'; Pyae Phyo Maung 25'; Sinthapaseuth 26' (o.g.); Bunliyong 39' (o.g.)	Report AFC; Report Asean	Chanchaleune 12'; Phommaxay 35'; Phiphakkhavong 38'; Souksabai 39'

Bangkok Arena, Bangkok
Attendance: 50
Referee: Hawkar Salar Ahmed (Iraq)
12 October 2015
14:00

Vietnam	5–6	Australia
Lê Quốc Nam 14'; Nguyễn Minh Trí 17'; Trần Văn Vũ 22'; Ngô Ngọc Sơn 27'; Dương Anh Tùng 28'	Report AFC; Report Asean	Fogarty 13', 15', 18', 23'; Basger 16'; Lockhart 27'

Bangkok Arena, Bangkok
Attendance: 300
Referee: Hasan Mohammed Al-Gburi (Iraq)

==== Semi-finals ====
14 October 2015
16:00

Thailand	6–0	Vietnam
Jirawat 29'; Nattawut 30'; Suphawut 32', 38', 39'; Jetsada 39'	Report AFC; Report Asean

Bangkok Arena, Bangkok
Attendance: 10,000
Referee: Tomohiro Kozaki (Japan)
14 October 2015
19:00

Australia	6–2	Malaysia
Niski 9'; Fogarty 10', 13'; Cooper 28', 32'; Basger 36'	Report AFC; Report Asean	Yazadh 21'; Nizam 37'

Bangkok Arena, Bangkok
Attendance: 3,000
Referee: Ali Reza Sohrabi Balsini (Iran)

==== Third place match ====
16 October 2015
16:00

Vietnam	5–6	Malaysia
Dương Anh Tùng 4'; Vũ Xuân Du 11'; Trần Văn Vũ 13'; Lê Quốc Nam 21'; Ngô Ngọc Sơn 30'	Report AFC; Report Asean	Khairul Effendy 12'; Fitri 14'; Nizam 18', 32', 39'; Fawzul 34'

Bangkok Arena, Bangkok
Attendance: 10,000
Referee: Liu Jianqiao (China)

==== Final ====
16 October 2015
19:00

Thailand	5–3	Australia
Kritsada 29', 29', 40'; Sorasak 34'; Warut 35'	Report AFC; Report Asean	Basger 22'; Barrientos 36'; Fogarty 39'

Bangkok Arena, Bangkok
Attendance: 10,000
Referee: Hawkar Salar Ahmed (Iraq)

=== Central Zone ===
- All matches were held in Tajikistan.
- Times listed were UTC+5.

Pos	Team	Pld	W	D	L	GF	GA	GD	Pts	Qualification
1	Kyrgyzstan	3	1	2	0	6	5	+1	5	2016 AFC Futsal Championship
2	Tajikistan (H)	3	1	1	1	11	11	0	4	2016 AFC Futsal Championship
3	Afghanistan	3	1	1	1	12	11	+1	4	
4	Turkmenistan	3	0	2	1	7	9	−2	2	

Source: AFC
Rules for classification: Qualification tiebreakers
(H) Hosts
14 November 2015
11:00

Kyrgyzstan	1–1	Turkmenistan
Tabaldiev 20'	Report	Annaýew 10'

Khujand Sport Palace, Khujand
Attendance: 1,200
Referee: Hasan Mousa Al-Gburi (Iraq)
14 November 2015
14:00

Tajikistan	6–5	Afghanistan
Mamedbabaev 11', 15'; Halimov 18'; Mirzorakhimov 19'; Alimakhmadov 32'; Fayazi 37' (o.g.)	Report	Kazemi 6', 34'; Khademi 7'; Hashemi 31'; Norowzi 36'

Khujand Sport Palace, Khujand
Attendance: 1,800
Referee: Abdulrahman Abdulqader Abdulla (Bahrain)

15 November 2015
11:00

Kyrgyzstan	2–2	Afghanistan
Alimov 14'; Kanetov 24'	Report	Kazemi 19', 32'

Khujand Sport Palace, Khujand
Attendance: 350
Referee: Hawkar Ahmed (Iraq)
15 November 2015
14:00

Turkmenistan	3–3	Tajikistan
Ovezov 16'; Soltanov 30'; Sahedov 40'	Report	Alimakhmadov 21'; Mamedbabaev 27'; Farmonbekov 34'

Khujand Sport Palace, Khujand
Attendance: 1,100
Referee: Husein Mahmoud Khalaileh (Jordan)

16 November 2015
11:00

Afghanistan	5–3	Turkmenistan
Madadi 6', 14', 20'; Fayazi 12'; Khademi 33'	Report	Soltanov 16'; Gurbanov 24'; Ashirov 26'

Khujand Sport Palace, Khujand
Attendance: 80
Referee: Khamis Al-Shamsi (United Arab Emirates)
16 November 2015
14:00

Tajikistan	2–3	Kyrgyzstan
Halimov 20'; Tabaldiev 30' (o.g.)	Report	Dzhetybaev 12'; Ermekov 25', 38'

Khujand Sport Palace, Khujand
Attendance: 1,200
Referee: Zhang Youze (China)

=== East Zone ===
- All matches were held in Mongolia.
- Times listed were UTC+8.

Pos	Team	Pld	W	D	L	GF	GA	GD	Pts	Qualification
1	China	4	3	1	0	15	5	+10	10	2016 AFC Futsal Championship
2	Chinese Taipei	4	3	0	1	18	15	+3	9	2016 AFC Futsal Championship
3	South Korea	4	2	1	1	21	14	+7	7	
4	Mongolia (H)	4	1	0	3	15	19	−4	3	
5	Hong Kong	4	0	0	4	10	26	−16	0	

Source: AFC
Rules for classification: Qualification tiebreakers
(H) Hosts
14 November 2015
17:00

Chinese Taipei	6–4	South Korea
Lin Chih-hung 1', 4'; Huang Po-chun 8'; Chu Chia-wei 12'; Lai Ming-hui 32'; Nam Il 35' (o.g.)	Report	Oh Hyun-jong 1', 33'; Ha Jin-won 20'; Shin Jong-hoon 28'

Buyant Ukhaa Sport Palace, Ulaanbaatar
Attendance: 326
Referee: Chris Colley (Australia)
14 November 2015
20:00

Mongolia	8–3	Hong Kong
Tsedenbal 6'; Enkh-Amga 14'; Norjmoo 17', 20', 22', 30'; Khurelbaatar 30'; Wong Chin Hung 33' (o.g.)	Report	Liu Yik Shing 12'; Wong Chin Hung 22'; Yeung Chi Lun 37'

Buyant Ukhaa Sport Palace, Ulaanbaatar
Attendance: 2,479
Referee: Trương Quốc Dũng (Vietnam)

15 November 2015
17:00

Hong Kong	0–5	China
	Report	Cong Lin 17', 33'; Gu Haitao 24'; Geng Deyang 31'; Zheng Lei 38'

Buyant Ukhaa Sport Palace, Ulaanbaatar
Attendance: 252
Referee: Ryan Shepheard (Australia)
15 November 2015
20:00

South Korea	7–3	Mongolia
Kim Min-kuk 3', 18'; Nam Il 4'; Olzvoi 15' (o.g.); Shin Jong-hoon 21', 35', 39'	Report	Oyunbat 26', 37'; Tsedenbal 32'

Buyant Ukhaa Sport Palace, Ulaanbaatar
Attendance: 1,874
Referee: Rey Ritaga (Philippines)

16 November 2015
17:00

China	3–1	Chinese Taipei
He Yihui 24'; Zeng Liang 36'; Liang Shiming 36'	Report	Chu Chia-wei 33'

Buyant Ukhaa Sport Palace, Ulaanbaatar
Attendance: 225
Referee: Maiket Yuttakon (Thailand)
16 November 2015
20:00

Hong Kong	2–7	South Korea
Liu Yik Shing 2'; So Sheung Kwai 9'	Report	Kim Min-kuk 11', 18'; Oh Hyun-jong 11', 30', 40'; Nam Il 30'; Kim Ho-jin 39'

Buyant Ukhaa Sport Palace, Ulaanbaatar
Attendance: 105
Referee: Helday Idang (Malaysia)

18 November 2015
17:00

Chinese Taipei	6–5	Hong Kong
Chu Chia-wei 1'; Chang Chien-ying 4'; Chi Sheng-fa 10', 27'; Lin Chien-hsun 31'; Huang Po-chun 39'	Report	Yeung Chi Lun 1', 19'; Liu Yik Shing 3'; Chan Kwong Ho 17'; Lin Chien-hsun 37' (o.g.)

Buyant Ukhaa Sport Palace, Ulaanbaatar
Attendance: 135
Referee: Ryan Shepheard (Australia)
18 November 2015
20:00

China	4–1	Mongolia
Batsaikhan 1' (o.g.); Geng Deyang 24'; Lu Yue 27'; He Yihui 35'	Report	Erdenebat 39'

Buyant Ukhaa Sport Palace, Ulaanbaatar
Attendance: 2,815
Referee: Maiket Yuttakon (Thailand)

19 November 2015
17:00

South Korea	3–3	China
Oh Hyun-jong 12', 21', 38'	Report	He Yihui 6', 36'; Zhang Wen 23'

Buyant Ukhaa Sport Palace, Ulaanbaatar
Attendance: 115
Referee: Chris Colley (Australia)
19 November 2015
20:00

Mongolia	3–5	Chinese Taipei
Norjmoo 9', 24'; Pagamsuren 32'	Report	Chu Chia-wei 3', 7'; Shih Pei-jen 9'; Huang Po-chun 17'; Lai Ming-hui 37'

Buyant Ukhaa Sport Palace, Ulaanbaatar
Attendance: 1,895
Referee: Helday Idang (Malaysia)

== Qualified teams ==
The following 16 teams qualified for the final tournament.

Team	Qualified as	Qualified on	Previous appearances in tournament^{3}
Uzbekistan	Hosts / 2014 third place	7 May 2014	13 (1999, 2000, 2001, 2002, 2003, 2004, 2005, 2006, 2007, 2008, 2010, 2012, 2014)
Japan	2014 champions	7 May 2014	13 (1999, 2000, 2001, 2002, 2003, 2004, 2005, **2006**, 2007, 2008, 2010, **2012**, **2014**)
Iran	2014 runners-up	7 May 2014	13 (**1999**, **2000**, **2001**, **2002**, **2003**, **2004**, **2005**, 2006, **2007**, **2008**, **2010**, 2012, 2014)
Lebanon	West Zone Group A winners	2 October 2015	9 (2003, 2004, 2005, 2006, 2007, 2008, 2010, 2012, 2014)
Jordan	West Zone Group A runners-up	3 October 2015	0 (debut)
Saudi Arabia	West Zone Group A 3rd place	13 November 2015	0 (debut)
Qatar	West Zone Group B winners	2 October 2015	2 (2005, 2012)
Iraq	West Zone Group B runners-up	2 October 2015	9 (2001, 2002, 2003, 2005, 2006, 2007, 2008, 2010, 2014)
Thailand	ASEAN Zone Group A winners	12 October 2015	13 (1999, 2000, 2001, 2002, 2003, 2004, 2005, 2006, 2007, 2008, 2010, 2012, 2014)
Malaysia	ASEAN Zone Group A runners-up	12 October 2015	10 (1999, 2001, 2002, 2003, 2004, 2005, 2006, 2007, 2008, 2014)
Australia	ASEAN Zone Group B winners	11 October 2015	6 (2006, 2007, 2008, 2010, 2012, 2014)
Vietnam	ASEAN Zone Group B runners-up	11 October 2015	3 (2005, 2010, 2014)
Kyrgyzstan	Central Zone winners	16 November 2015	13 (1999, 2000, 2001, 2002, 2003, 2004, 2005, 2006, 2007, 2008, 2010, 2012, 2014)
Tajikistan	Central Zone runners-up	16 November 2015	8 (2001, 2005, 2006, 2007, 2008, 2010, 2012, 2014)
China	East Zone winners	19 November 2015	10 (2002, 2003, 2004, 2005, 2006, 2007, 2008, 2010, 2012, 2014)
Chinese Taipei	East Zone runners-up	19 November 2015	10 (2001, 2002, 2003, 2004, 2005, 2006, 2008, 2010, 2012, 2014)

^{3} Bold indicates champion for that year. Italic indicates host for that year.
