= Purevdorj Erdenebat =

Mongolian international footballer

Personal information
- Date of birth: 10 February 1994 (age 32)
- Place of birth: Mongolia
- Position: Midfielder

Team information
- Current team: FC UBU
- Number: 11

Senior career*
Years	Team	Apps	(Gls)
2010–	FC UBU		

International career^{‡}
2016–	Mongolia	4	(1)
2017–	Mongolia (futsal)	3	(2)
- * Club domestic league appearances and goals as of 19:57, 4 June 2017 (UTC) ‡ National team caps and goals as of 19:57, 4 June 2017 (UTC)

Purevdorj Erdenebat (Mongolian: Эрдэнэбат Пүрэвдорж; born 10 February 1994), is a Mongolian international footballer who plays as a midfielder for Mongolian National Premier League side Ulaanbaatar University Football Club.

== International career ==
Purevdorj made his international debut in a 2–2 draw with Macau at the 2017 EAFF E-1 Football Championship. He replaced Murun Altankhuyag in the 80th minute.

== International statistics ==
As of match played 4 June 2017.

National team	Year	Apps	Goals
Mongolia	2016	4	1
Mongolia	2017	0	0
Total		4	1

=== International goals ===
Scores and results list Mongolia's goal tally first.

No	Date	Venue	Opponent	Score	Result	Competition
1.	4 July 2016	National Training Center, Dededo, Guam	Northern Mariana Islands	7–0	8–0	2017 EAFF E-1 Football Championship
