= Filipe Duarte =

Filipe Duarte may refer to:

- Filipe Duarte (footballer) (born 1985), Portuguese-born Macanease footballer
- Filipe Duarte (actor) (1973–2020), Angolan-born Portuguese actor and voice artist
