= 2017 EAFF E-1 Football Championship =

EAFF E-1 サッカー選手権 2017

Tournament details
- Host country: Japan
- City: Tokyo
- Dates: 9–16 December
- Teams: 4 (from 1 sub-confederation)
- Venue: 1 (in 1 host city)

Final positions
- Champions: South Korea (4th title)
- Runners-up: Japan
- Third place: China
- Fourth place: North Korea

Tournament statistics
- Matches played: 6
- Goals scored: 16 (2.67 per match)
- Attendance: 107,523 (17,921 per match)
- Top scorer: (South Korea) Kim Shin-wook (3 goals)
- Best player: (South Korea) Lee Jae-sung
- Best goalkeeper: (South Korea) Jo Hyeon-woo

The 2017 EAFF E-1 Football Championship was the 7th edition of the EAFF E-1 Football Championship, the football championship of East Asia. It was held in Japan in December 2017. Through the agreement between EAFF and ASEAN Football Federation (AFF), the winner of the tournament will qualified for the AFF–EAFF Champions Trophy.

The winner of the 2017 EAFF E-1 Football Championship, South Korea, qualified for the 2019 AFF–EAFF Champions Trophy to meet the winner of 2018 AFF Championship of Vietnam.

== Team allocation ==
Based on their previous edition's results in 2015, the ten teams were allocated to their particular stage. Each winner of the preliminary round progressed to the next stage.

Final Round	Second Preliminary round	First Preliminary round
Japan (hosts); South Korea; China	North Korea; Hong Kong (hosts); Guam	Chinese Taipei; Macau; Mongolia; Northern Mariana Islands (non-FIFA member)

== Venues ==
Final Round	Preliminary round	
(Japan) Tokyo	(Guam) Dededo	Hong Kong
Ajinomoto Stadium	GFA National Training Center	Mong Kok Stadium
Capacity: 49,970	Capacity: 5,000	Capacity: 6,664

== First preliminary round ==
The first preliminary round was held in Guam.

=== Table ===
Pos	Team	Pld	W	D	L	GF	GA	GD	Pts	Qualification
1	Chinese Taipei	3	3	0	0	13	3	+10	9	Advance to Second Preliminary round
2	Mongolia	3	1	1	1	10	4	+6	4	
3	Macau	3	1	1	1	7	6	+1	4	
4	Northern Mariana Islands	3	0	0	3	2	19	−17	0	

Source: EAFF.com

=== Matches ===
- All times are local (UTC+10).
30 June 2016
14:30

Macau	2–2	Mongolia
Leong Ka Hang 38'; Duarte 44'	Report	Bayarjargal 10' (pen.), 64' (pen.)

GFA National Training Center, Dededo
Referee: Kim Woo-sung (South Korea)
30 June 2016
17:00

Chinese Taipei	8–1	Northern Mariana Islands
Wu Chun-ching 30', 56'; Chen Wei-chuan 37'; Lin Chien-hsun 40', 64', 81', 90+2'; Chen Yi-wei 45+1'	Report	Schuler 90'

GFA National Training Center, Dededo
Referee: Khash-Erdene Bold (Mongolia)

2 July 2016
14:30

Northern Mariana Islands	1–3	Macau
Griffin 11' (pen.)	Report	Lam Ka Seng 9', 90+4'; Duarte 40'

GFA National Training Center, Dededo
Referee: Chen Hsin-chuan (Chinese Taipei)
2 July 2016
17:00

Mongolia	0–2	Chinese Taipei
	Report	Lin Chien-hsun 57'; Lin Shih-kai 90'

GFA National Training Center, Dededo
Referee: Takuto Okabe (Japan)

4 July 2016
14:30

Northern Mariana Islands	0–8	Mongolia
	Report	Bayarjargal 27' (pen.), 36' (pen.); Nyam-Osor 39'; Daginaa 45'; Tögöldör 54', 55', 84'; Erdenebat 79'

GFA National Training Center, Dededo
Referee: Takuto Okabe (Japan)
4 July 2016
17:00

Chinese Taipei	3–2	Macau
Lin Chien-hsun 36', 64'; Tseng Chih-wei 88'	Report	Chan Man 7'; Lei Ka Him 77'

GFA National Training Center, Dededo
Referee: Kim Woo-sung (South Korea)

=== Awards ===
Top scorer	Most Valuable Player
(Chinese Taipei) Lin Chien-hsun	(Chinese Taipei) Lin Chien-hsun

== Second preliminary round ==
The second preliminary round was held in Hong Kong.

=== Table ===
Pos	Team	Pld	W	D	L	GF	GA	GD	Pts	Qualification
1	North Korea	3	3	0	0	5	0	+5	9	Advance to Final Round
2	Hong Kong (H)	3	2	0	1	7	5	+2	6	
3	Chinese Taipei	3	1	0	2	4	6	−2	3	
4	Guam	3	0	0	3	2	7	−5	0	

Source: EAFF.com
(H) Hosts

=== Matches ===
- All times are local (UTC+8).
6 November 2016
15:00

North Korea	2–0	Chinese Taipei
Jong Il-gwan 16'; Sim Hyon-jin 87'	Report

Mong Kok Stadium, Hong Kong
Referee: Pranjal Banerjee (India)
6 November 2016
18:00

Hong Kong	3–2	Guam
Akande 19', 67' (pen.); Sandro 22'	Report	Cunliffe 74'; Malcolm 81'

Mong Kok Stadium, Hong Kong
Attendance: 3,299
Referee: Võ Minh Trí (Vietnam)

9 November 2016
17:00

Guam	0–2	North Korea
	Report	So Hyon-uk 66'; Pak Kwang-ryong 87'

Mong Kok Stadium, Hong Kong
Referee: Khash-Erdene Bold (Mongolia)
9 November 2016
20:00

Hong Kong	4–2	Chinese Taipei
Akande 21', 48', 70', 71'	Report	Chen Po-liang 62'; Chen Chao-an 88'

Mong Kok Stadium, Hong Kong
Attendance: 3,354
Referee: Wang Di (China)

12 November 2016
15:00

Chinese Taipei	2–0	Guam
Wu Chun-ching 26'; Lin Chien-hsun 80'	Report

Mong Kok Stadium, Hong Kong
Referee: Tumenbayar Doljinsuren (Mongolia)
12 November 2016
18:00

Hong Kong	0–1	North Korea
	Report	Jong Il-gwan 22'

Mong Kok Stadium, Hong Kong
Attendance: 4,838
Referee: Pranjal Banerjee (India)

=== Awards ===
Top scorer	Most Valuable Player
(Hong Kong) Alex Akande	(North Korea) Ri Yong-chol

== Final tournament ==
The final competition was held in Japan from 9 to 16 December 2017.

=== Table ===
Pos	Team	Pld	W	D	L	GF	GA	GD	Pts	Result
1	South Korea (C)	3	2	1	0	7	3	+4	7	Champions
2	Japan (H)	3	2	0	1	4	5	−1	6	Runners-up
3	China	3	0	2	1	4	5	−1	2	Third place
4	North Korea	3	0	1	2	1	3	−2	1	Fourth place

Source: EAFF.com
(C) Champions; (H) Hosts

=== Matches ===
- All times are local (UTC+9).
9 December 2017
16:30

South Korea	2–2	China
Kim Shin-wook 12'; Lee Jae-sung 19'	Report	Wei Shihao 9'; Yu Dabao 76'

Ajinomoto Stadium, Chōfu
Attendance: 9,103
Referee: Khamis Al-Marri (Qatar)
9 December 2017
19:15

Japan	1–0	North Korea
Ideguchi 90+3'	Report

Ajinomoto Stadium, Chōfu
Attendance: 20,806
Referee: Chris Beath (Australia)

12 December 2017
16:30

North Korea	0–1	South Korea
	Report	Ri Yong-chol 64' (o.g.)

Ajinomoto Stadium, Chōfu
Attendance: 5,477
Referee: Hettikamkanamge Perera (Sri Lanka)
12 December 2017
19:15

Japan	2–1	China
Kobayashi 84'; Shōji 88'	Report	Yu Dabao 90+3' (pen.)

Ajinomoto Stadium, Chōfu
Attendance: 17,220
Referee: Muhammad Taqi (Singapore)

16 December 2017
16:30

China	1–1	North Korea
Wei Shihao 28'	Report	Jong Il-gwan 81'

Ajinomoto Stadium, Chōfu
Attendance: 18,272
Referee: Valentin Kovalenko (Uzbekistan)
16 December 2017
19:15

Japan	1–4	South Korea
Kobayashi 3' (pen.)	Report	Kim Shin-wook 13', 35'; Jung Woo-young 23'; Yeom Ki-hun 69'

Ajinomoto Stadium, Chōfu
Attendance: 36,645
Referee: Chris Beath (Australia)

=== Awards ===
Best goalkeeper	Best defender	Top scorer	Most Valuable Player
(South Korea) Jo Hyeon-woo	(South Korea) Jang Hyun-soo	(South Korea) Kim Shin-wook	(South Korea) Lee Jae-sung

=== Goalscorers ===
3 goals

- (South Korea) Kim Shin-wook

2 goals

- (China) Wei Shihao
- (China) Yu Dabao
- (Japan) Yu Kobayashi

1 goal

- (Japan) Yosuke Ideguchi
- (Japan) Gen Shōji
- (South Korea) Jung Woo-young
- (South Korea) Lee Jae-sung
- (South Korea) Yeom Ki-hun
- (North Korea) Jong Il-gwan

1 own goal

- (North Korea) Ri Yong-chol

== Final ranking ==
Pos	Team	Pld	W	D	L	GF	GA	GD	Pts	Final result
1	South Korea	3	2	1	0	7	3	+4	7	Champions
2	Japan	3	2	0	1	4	5	−1	6	Runners-up
3	China	3	0	2	1	4	5	−1	2	Third Place
4	North Korea	6	3	1	2	6	3	+3	10	Fourth Place
5	Hong Kong	3	2	0	1	7	5	+2	6	Eliminated in Second Preliminary round
6	Chinese Taipei	6	4	0	2	17	9	+8	12	Eliminated in Second Preliminary round
7	Guam	3	0	0	3	2	7	−5	0	Eliminated in Second Preliminary round
8	Mongolia	3	1	1	1	10	4	+6	4	Eliminated in First Preliminary round
9	Macau	3	1	1	1	7	6	+1	4	Eliminated in First Preliminary round
10	Northern Mariana Islands	3	0	0	3	2	19	−17	0	Eliminated in First Preliminary round

Source: EAFF.com

Per statistical convention in football, matches decided in extra time are counted as wins and losses, while matches decided by penalty shoot-out are counted as draws.

== Broadcasting rights ==
- China: CCTV, PPTV and Guangdong Sports
- Japan: Fuji TV
- South Korea: SPOTV
- Hong Kong: ViuTV
- Macau: TDM (Macau)
- Taiwan: Gala Television
- Mongolia: Mongolian National Broadcaster
- Guam: KGTF
- North Korea: Korean Central Television
