= Wei Yu-jen =

Taiwanese footballer

Personal information
- Full name: Wei Yu-jen
- Date of birth: January 14, 1994 (age 32)
- Place of birth: Chinese Taipei
- Position: Midfielder

International career^{‡}
Years	Team	Apps	(Gls)
2015–	Chinese Taipei	2	(0)
- ‡ National team caps and goals as of 15:05, 1 October 2015 (UTC)

Wei Yu-jen (韋育任; born 14 January 1994) is a Taiwanese football player who plays as a midfielder.

== International goals ==
=== U23 ===
No.	Date	Venue	Opponent	Score	Result	Competition
1.	31 March 2015	National Stadium, Kaohsiung, Taiwan	Hong Kong	1–0	3–1	2016 AFC U-23 Championship qualification
