= Lam Ka Seng =

Macanese footballer

Personal information
- Date of birth: 28 May 1994 (age 32)
- Place of birth: Macau
- Position: Midfielder

Team information
- Current team: Chao Pak Kei
- Number: 11

Senior career*
Years	Team	Apps	(Gls)
2012–2015	MFA Development		
2016–	C.P.K.	58	(16)

International career^{‡}
2014–	Macau	25	(6)
- * Club domestic league appearances and goals as of 19:01, 13 March 2022 (UTC) ‡ National team caps and goals as of 19:01, 13 March 2023 (UTC)

Lam Ka Seng (林嘉誠, born 28 May 1994) is a Macanese international footballer who plays as a midfielder for Chao Pak Kei and the Macau national football team.

== International career ==
Lam made his senior international debut in 2014, replacing Pang Chi Hang in a 0–0 draw with Guam. He scored in a 5-1 friendly defeat by Chinese Taipei in late 2015.

== Career statistics ==
=== Club ===
As of 13 March 2021.

Club	Season	League			Cup		Continental		Other		Total	
Club	Season	Division	Apps	Goals	Apps	Goals	Apps	Goals	Apps	Goals	Apps	Goals
MFA Development	2013	Campeonato da 1ª Divisão do Futebol	15	0	0	0	–		0	0	15	0
MFA Development	2014	Campeonato da 1ª Divisão do Futebol	16	1	0	0	–		0	0	16	1
MFA Development	2015	Campeonato da 1ª Divisão do Futebol	16	0	0	0	–		0	0	16	0
MFA Development	Total		47	1	0	0	0	0	0	0	47	1
C.P.K.	2016	Campeonato da 1ª Divisão do Futebol	5	0	0	0	–		0	0	5	0
C.P.K.	2017	Liga de Elite	16	6	0	0	–		0	0	16	6
C.P.K.	2018	Liga de Elite	14	4	0	0	–		0	0	14	4
C.P.K.	2019	Liga de Elite	15	1	0	0	–		0	0	15	1
C.P.K.	2020	Liga de Elite	8	5	0	0	–		0	0	8	5
C.P.K.	2021	Liga de Elite	0	0	0	0	–		0	0	0	0
C.P.K.	Total		58	16	0	0	0	0	0	0	58	16
Career total			105	17	0	0	0	0	0	0	105	17

=== International ===
As of 13 March 2021.

National team	Year	Apps	Goals
Macau	2014	3	1
Macau	2015	2	1
Macau	2016	7	2
Macau	2017	6	0
Macau	2018	6	2
Macau	2019	1	0
Total		25	6

=== International goals ===
Scores and results list Macau's goal tally first.

No	Date	Venue	Opponent	Score	Result	Competition
1.	24 July 2014	GFA National Training Center, Dededo, Guam	Mongolia	?–?	3–2	2015 EAFF East Asian Cup qualification
2.	9 October 2015	Taipei Municipal Stadium, Taipei, Taiwan	Chinese Taipei	1–0	1–5	Friendly
3.	2 July 2016	GFA National Training Center, Dededo, Guam	Northern Mariana Islands	1–0	3–1	2017 EAFF E-1 East Asian Cup qualification
4.	2 July 2016	GFA National Training Center, Dededo, Guam	Northern Mariana Islands	3–1	3–1	2017 EAFF E-1 East Asian Cup qualification
5.	29 August 2018	Estádio Campo Desportivo, Taipa, Macau	Solomon Islands	1–4	1–4	Friendly
6.	4 September 2018	MFF Football Centre, Ulaanbaatar, Mongolia	Guam	1–0	2–0	2019 EAFF E-1 Football Championship qualification
