= Tseng Chih-wei =

Taiwanese footballer

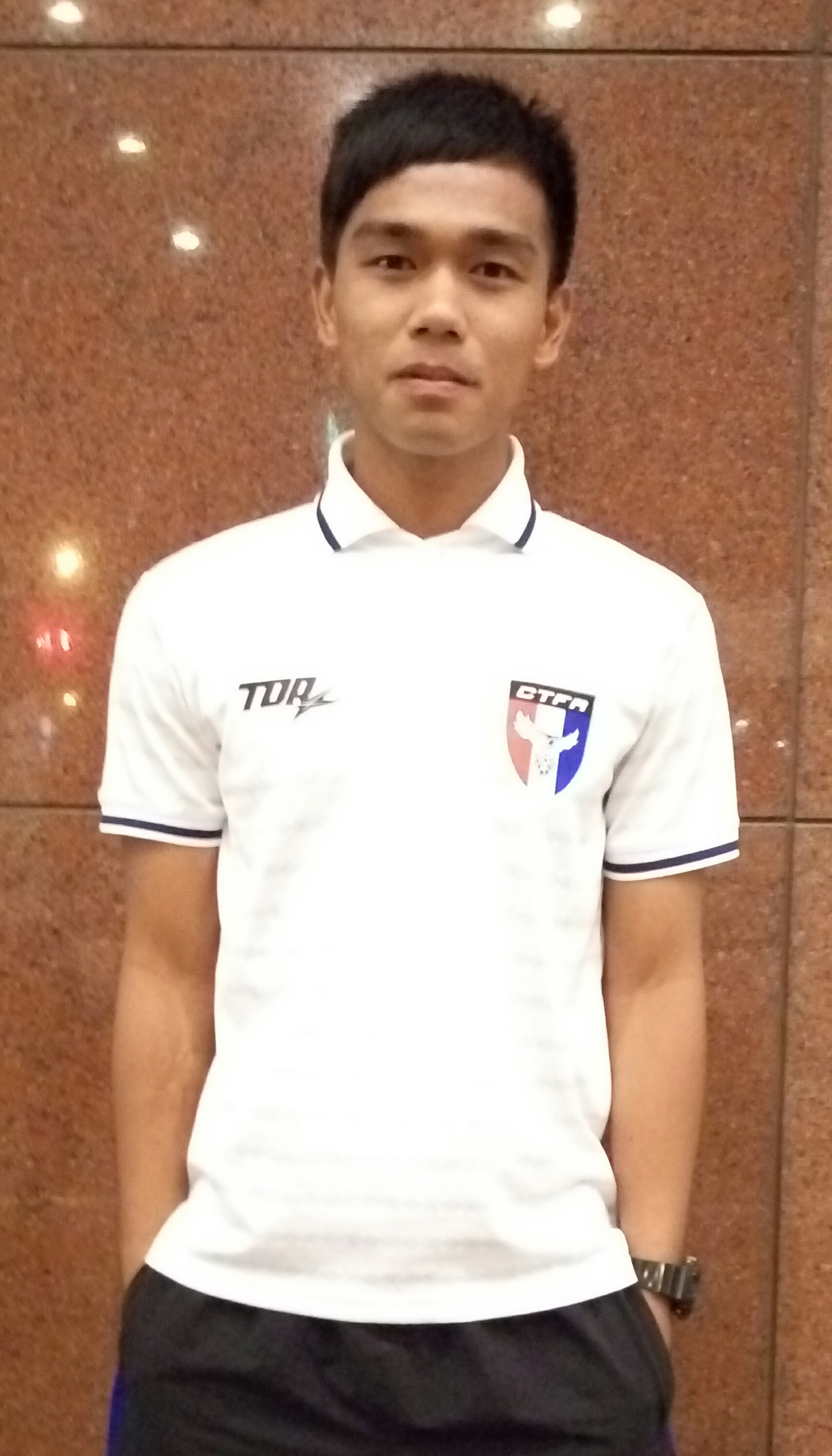
- Tseng Chih-wei in 2016

Personal information
- Date of birth: November 2, 1991 (age 35)
- Place of birth: Pingtung County, Taiwan
- Position: Forward

Team information
- Current team: National Sports Training Center

Senior career*
Years	Team	Apps	(Gls)
2013–2015	Tatung		
2016–	National Sports Training Center		

International career^{‡}
2015–	Chinese Taipei	4	(1)
- * Club domestic league appearances and goals ‡ National team caps and goals as of 4 July 2016

Tseng Chih-wei (Chinese: 曾志偉; born 2 November 1991) is a Taiwanese footballer who currently plays as a forward at the national and club level.

== International goals ==
.Scores and results are list Taiwan's goal tally first.

No.	Date	Venue	Opponent	Score	Result	Competition
1.	4 July 2016	GFA National Training Center, Dededo, Guam	Macau	3–2	3–2	2017 EAFF E-1 Football Championship
