= Ko Yu-ting =

Taiwanese footballer (born 1994)

Ko Yu-ting 柯昱廷
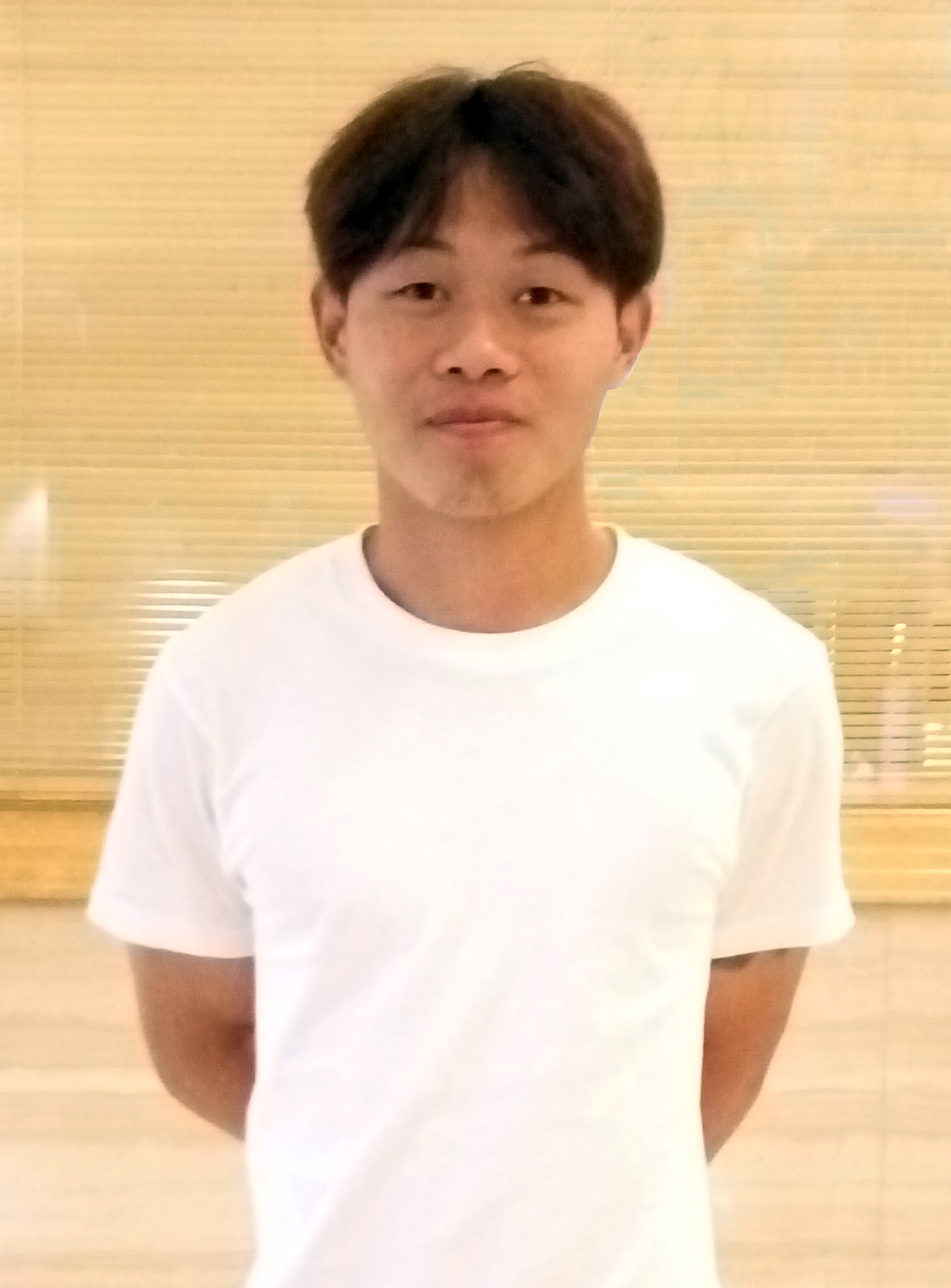
- Ko in 2016

Personal information
- Full name: Ko Yu-ting
- Date of birth: 18 January 1994 (age 32)
- Place of birth: Taipei, Taiwan
- Height: 1.65 m (5 ft 5 in)
- Position: Striker

Team information
- Current team: Taipower FC
- Number: 11

Senior career*
Years	Team	Apps	(Gls)
2014	Tatung		
2015–2017	Changchun Yatai	0	(0)
2017	Tatung		
2018–	Taipower FC	56	(12)

International career^{‡}
2015–	Chinese Taipei	12	(2)
- * Club domestic league appearances and goals as of 20 November 2022 ‡ National team caps and goals as of 12 October 2023

Ko Yu-ting (Chinese: 柯昱廷; pinyin: Kē Yùtíng; born 18 January 1994) is a Taiwanese footballer who plays as a striker for both the Taiwan Football Premier League club Taiwan Power Company and the Chinese Taipei national team.

== International goals ==
=== U19 ===
No.	Date	Venue	Opponent	Score	Result	Competition
1.	10 November 2011	Thephasadin Stadium, Bangkok, Thailand	Guam	3–0	11–0	2012 AFC U-19 Championship qualification

=== U23 ===
No.	Date	Venue	Opponent	Score	Result	Competition
1.	31 March 2015	National Stadium, Kaohsiung, Taiwan	Hong Kong	1–0	3–1	2016 AFC U-23 Championship qualification

=== International goals ===
International goals by date, venue, opponent, score, result and competition
No.	Date	Venue	Opponent	Score	Result	Competition
1	12 October 2023	National Stadium, Kaohsiung, Taiwan	Timor-Leste	4–0	4–0	2022 FIFA World Cup qualification
