= Buyant Ukhaa Sport Palace =

Indoor arena in Khan Uul, Ulaanbaatar, Mongolia

Buyant Ukhaa Sport Palace Буянт Ухаа Спорт Ордон

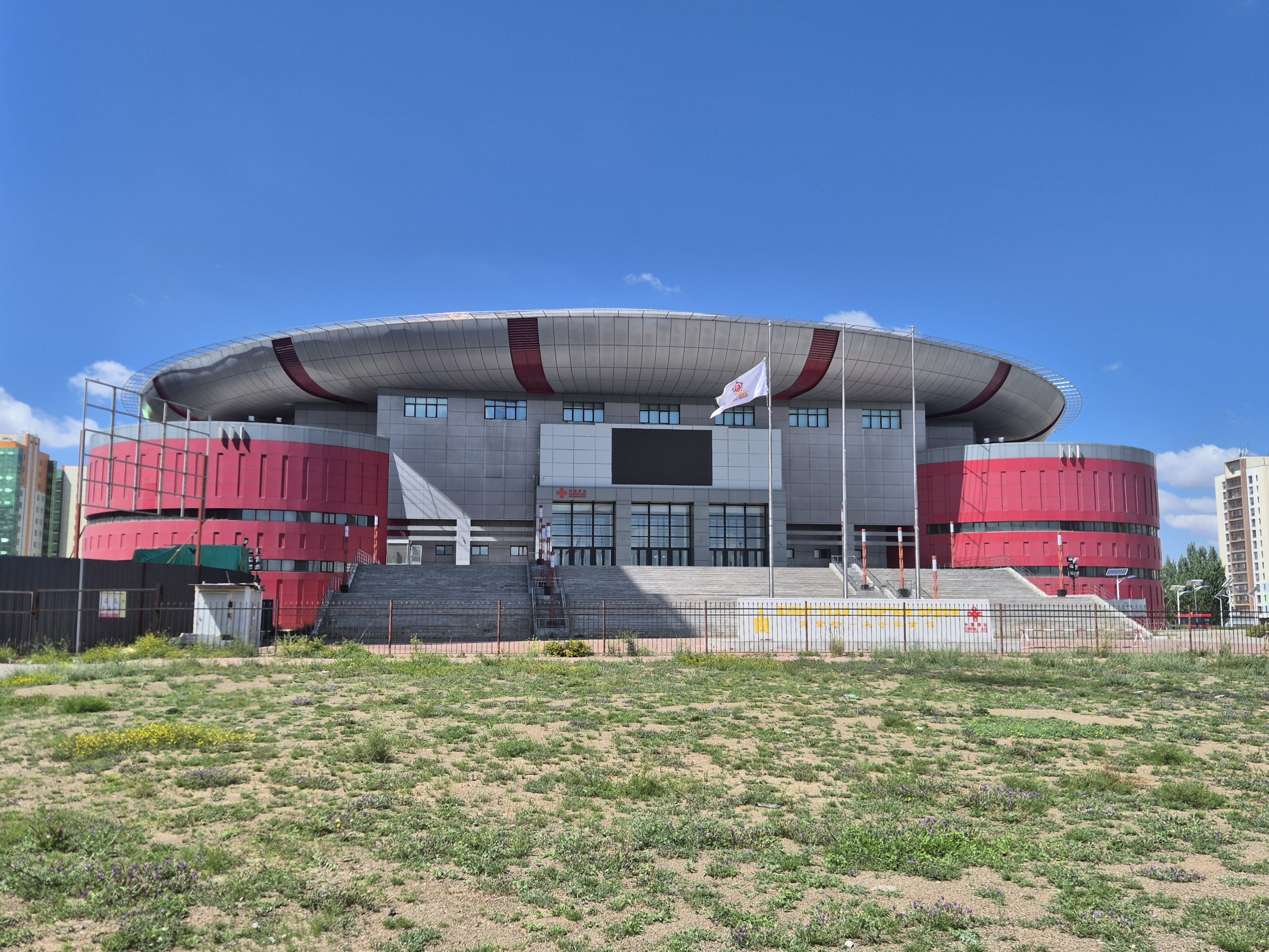
- Interactive map of Buyant Ukhaa Sport Palace; Буянт Ухаа Спорт Ордон
- Location: 10th khoroo, Khan Uul, Ulaanbaatar, Mongolia
- Coordinates: 47.854°N 106.784°E
- Capacity: 5,045

Construction
- Groundbreaking: 2008
- Opened: June 2011
- Cost: 160mil ¥ (20,526,636.18USD)
- Architects: China Foreign Construction Engineering Design Consultant Co., Ltd.
- General contractor: Shanghai Construction Group

Tenant
- Mongolia national futsal team

The Buyant Ukhaa Sport Palace (Mongolian: Буянт Ухаа Спорт Ордон, romanized: Buyant Ukhaa Sport Ordon) is a 274,000 square meter multi-purpose indoor arena in Khan Uul, Ulaanbaatar, Mongolia, adjacent to the Buyant-Ukhaa International Airport. The 5,045-seat arena was built using a grant from the People's Republic of China. The total cost of the arena was 160mil ¥ (20,526,636.18USD) in 2009. The Shanghai Construction Group completed construction in June 2011. The arena can host events in basketball, volleyball, badminton, wrestling, and judo, among others. A dedication ceremony was held in December 2010 with Chinese and Mongolian officials.

== Events ==
The arena hosted the 2013 Asian Under-23 Fencing Championships.

In November 2015, Mongolia hosted the East Zone (EAFF) matches of 2016 AFC Futsal Championship qualification at the Sports Palace.

Wrestling qualification for the 2016 Summer Olympics in Rio de Janeiro was held at the arena.

In December 2016, the Dalai Lama visited Mongolia and held a gathering for Mongolia Buddhists at the Sports Palace. The event caused political tension between Mongolia and China as China views the Dalai Lama as a dangerous separatist. Chinese officials postponed meetings with Mongolian officials and imposed new fees on commodity shipments because of the event causing Mongolian officials to announce that the religious leader would not be invited again.

- 2015 Judo Grand Prix Ulaanbaatar
