= Mongolia national futsal team =

Football team of Mongolia

Mongolia
- Nickname(s): Хөх чононууд/чонос (The Blue Wolves); Улаан армийн (The Red Army)
- Association: Mongolian Football Federation
- Confederation: AFC (Asia)
- Home stadium: Buyant Ukhaa Sport Palace
- FIFA code: MNG
- FIFA ranking: 115 (24 September 2026)
Home colours	Away colours

First international
- South Korea 5–1 Mongolia (Cheras, Malaysia; 13 November 2011)

Biggest win
- Mongolia 8–3 Hong Kong (Ulaanbaatar, Mongolia; 14 November 2015)

Biggest defeat
- Kazakhstan 21-0 Mongolia (Almaty, Kazakhstan; 21 September 2019)

FIFA World Cup
- Appearances: None

AFC Futsal Championship
- Appearances: None

EAFF Futsal Championship
- Appearances: None

The Mongolia national futsal team is controlled by the Mongolian Football Federation, the governing body for futsal in Mongolia and represents the country in international futsal competitions.

== Competitive record ==
=== FIFA Futsal World Cup ===
FIFA Futsal World Cup record
Host/Year	Result	Position	Pld	W	D	L	GF	GA
(Netherlands) 1989	Did not enter							
(Hong Kong) 1992	Did not enter							
(Spain) 1996	Did not enter							
(Guatemala) 2000	Did not enter							
(Taiwan) 2004	Did not enter							
(Brazil) 2008	Did not enter							
(Thailand) 2012	Did not qualify							
(Colombia) 2016	Did not qualify							
(Lithuania) 2021	Did not qualify							
(Uzbekistan) 2024	Did not qualify							
2028
Total	0	0	0	0	0	0	0	0

== Competitive record ==
=== AFC Futsal Championship ===
AFC Futsal Championship record
Host/Year	Result	Position	Pld	W	D	L	GF	GA
(Malaysia) 1999	Did not enter							
(Thailand) 2000	Did not enter							
(Iran) 2001	Did not enter							
(Indonesia) 2002	Did not enter							
(Iran) 2003	Did not enter							
(Macau) 2004	Did not enter							
(Vietnam) 2005	Did not enter							
(Uzbekistan) 2006	Did not enter							
(Japan) 2007	Did not enter							
(Thailand) 2008	Did not enter							
(Uzbekistan) 2010	Did not enter							
(United Arab Emirates) 2012	Did not qualify							
(Vietnam) 2014	Did not enter							
(Uzbekistan) 2016	Did not qualify							
(Taiwan) 2018	Did not qualify							
(Turkmenistan) 2020	Cancelled							
(Kuwait) 2022	Did not qualify							
(Thailand) 2024	Did not qualify							
(Indonesia) 2026	Did not qualify							
Total	0	0	0	0	0	0	0	0

== Competitive record ==
=== EAFF Futsal Championship ===
EAFF Futsal Championship record
Host/Year	Result	Position	Pld	W	D	L	GF	GA
(China) 2009	Did not enter							
(Vietnam) 2014	Did not enter							
(Mongolia) 2016	Did not enter							
(Thailand) 2018	Did not enter							
(China) 2020	Play off lost							
(Malaysia) 2022	Did not enter							
(Chinese Taipei) (Mongolia) (Saudi Arabia) (Thailand) 2024	Did not enter							
(Indonesia) 2026	did not enter							
