= Filipe Duarte (footballer) =

Macanease footballer

Personal information
- Full name: Filipe Manuel Cordeiro Duarte
- Date of birth: 30 March 1985 (age 41)
- Place of birth: Lisbon, Portugal
- Height: 1.80 m (5 ft 11 in)
- Position: Centre back

Youth career
- 1994–1999: Tenente Valdez
- 1999–2004: Benfica

Senior career*
Years	Team	Apps	(Gls)
2004–2005	Benfica B		
2005–2007	Apollon Limassol	3	(0)
2008	Operário	7	(0)
2008–2011	Oriental	38	(5)
2012–2023	Benfica Macau	120	(26)
2023-2025	Chao Pak Kei	32	(4)
2025	Benfica Macau	8	(0)

International career
2000–2001	Portugal U15	8	(0)
2001–2002	Portugal U17	6	(0)
2003	Portugal U18	2	(0)
2003	Portugal U19	8	(0)
2004–2005	Portugal U20	6	(0)
2016–2023	Macau	13	(3)
- * Club domestic league appearances and goals as of 10 February 2026

Filipe Manuel Cordeiro Duarte (born 30 March 1985) is a professional footballer who most recently played for Benfica de Macau as a central defender. Born in Portugal, he played for the Macau national team.

== International career ==
Filipe Duarte secured Macau's first ever World Cup qualifying win on 6 June 2019 against Sri Lanka. But the Macau Football Association then refused to send the team to Sri Lanka to play the second leg due to security reasons.

On 30 August 2024, it was announced that Durate, along with other Portuguese-born permanent Macanese residents are ineligible to play for the Macau National Football Team, ending his international career with Macau.

=== International goals ===
Scores and results list Macau's goal tally first.

No.	Date	Venue	Opponent	Score	Result	Competition
1.	30 June 2016	Guam Football Association National Training Center, Dededo, Guam	Mongolia	2–1	2–2	2017 EAFF E-1 Football Championship qualification
2.	2 July 2016	Guam Football Association National Training Center, Dededo, Guam	Northern Mariana Islands	2–1	3–1	2017 EAFF E-1 Football Championship qualification
3.	6 June 2019	Zhuhai Sports Centre Stadium, Zhuhai, China	Sri Lanka	1–0	1–0	2022 FIFA World Cup qualification

== Honours ==
Filipe Duarte was voted Macau Footballer of the Year at the Best Elite League Players (Melhores Jogadores da Liga Elite) awards on 22 September 2019.
