= List of football clubs in Guam =

This is a list of association football clubs in Guam, a United States territory in Micronesia. The clubs listed compete or have competed in organized football leagues on the island.

== The football clubs ==
- Bank of Guam
- Bentley United
- Carpet Masters
- Dededo Soccer Club
- Guam Shipyard
- KFC Soccer Club
- NO KA OI
- Paintco Strykers
- Quality Distributors
- Big Blue
- Crushers
- DeYo
- Fuji Ichiban Espada
- Han Ma Um
- Hyundai/Family
- Islanders
- Paintco Strykers II
- Rovers
- Toyota 4Runners
- Younex/Sheraton
