= Liu Yik Shing =

Hong Kong footballer

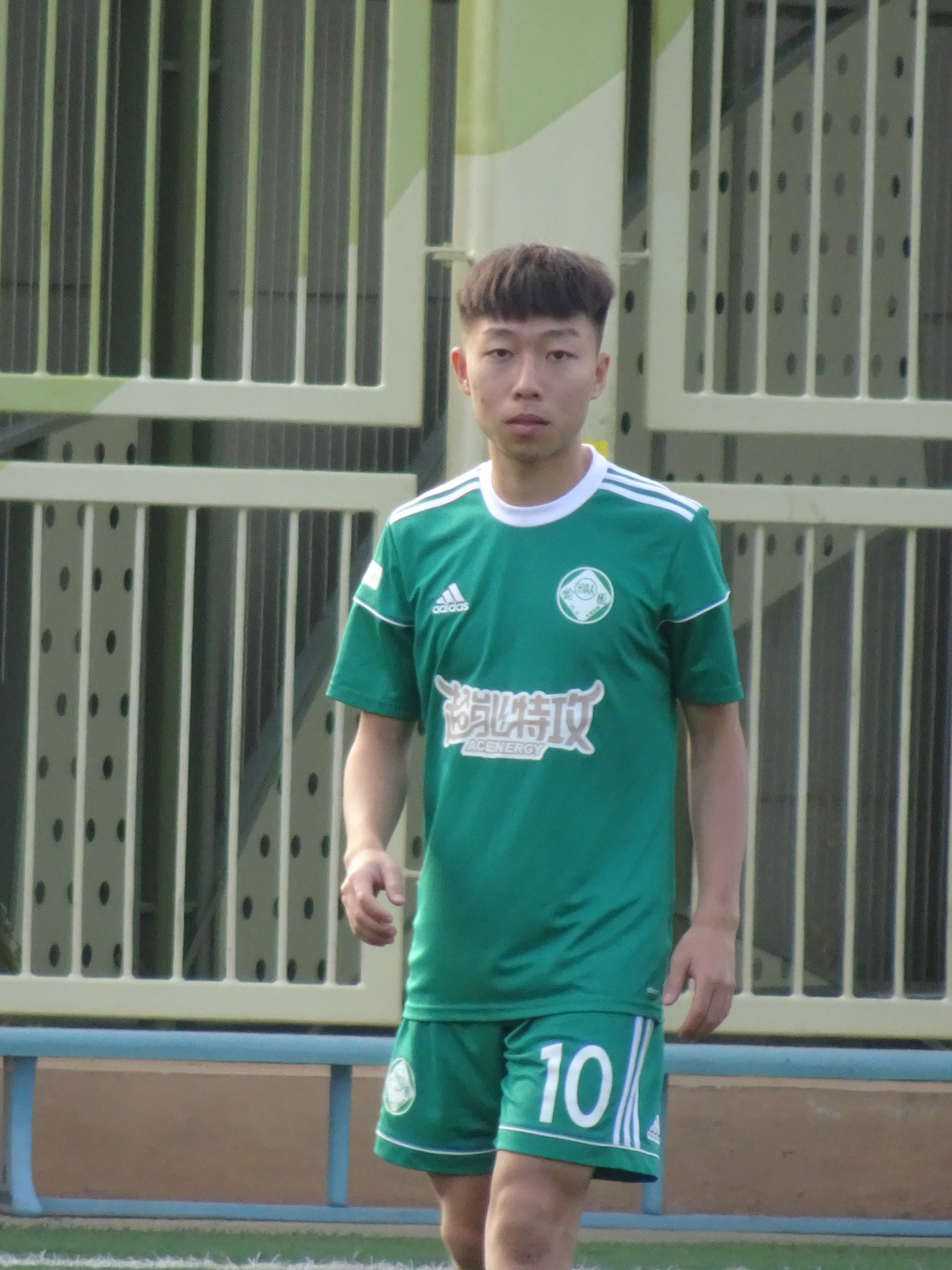
- A pictureod Liu Yik Shing

Personal information
- Full name: Liu Yik Shing
- Date of birth: 17 July 1995 (age 31)
- Place of birth: Hong Kong
- Height: 1.68 m (5 ft 6 in)
- Position: Midfielder

Senior career*
Years	Team	Apps	(Gls)
2015	Double Flower	9	(1)
2016–2017	Resources Capital	23	(7)
2017–2019	Happy Valley	45	(7)
2019–2022	Resources Capital	31	(5)
2022–2023	North District	25	(2)
2023–2024	Kowloon City	18	(4)
2024–	South China	47	(9)
- * Club domestic league appearances and goals as of 17 May 2026

Liu Yik Shing (Chinese: 廖億誠; born 17 July 1995) is a former Hong Kong professional footballer who played as a midfielder.
