= Ri Yong-chol =

North Korean speed skater

Personal information
- Nationality: North Korean
- Born: 14 February 1972 (age 53)

Sport
- Sport: Speed skating

Ri Yong-chol (born 14 February 1972) is a North Korean speed skater. He competed in two events at the 1992 Winter Olympics.
