= Tang Hou Fai =

Macau footballer

Personal information
- Full name: Tang Hou Fai
- Date of birth: April 1, 1993 (age 33)
- Place of birth: Macau
- Position: Defender

Team information
- Current team: G.D. Lam Pak

International career
Years	Team	Apps	(Gls)
2010–	Macau	9	(0)

Tang Hou Fai(鄧浩輝) was a Macanese international footballer who played for G.D. Lam Pak and the Macau national team.

== International goals ==
No.	Date	Venue	Opponent	Score	Result	Competition
1.	25 July 2014	GFA National Training Center, Dededo, Guam	Mongolia	?-?	3-2	2015 EAFF East Asian Cup
