= Jang Hyun-soo (footballer, born 1993) =

South Korean footballer

Personal information
- Full name: Jang Hyun-soo
- Date of birth: 1 January 1993 (age 33)
- Place of birth: South Korea
- Height: 1.79 m (5 ft 10 in)
- Position: Midfielder

Team information
- Current team: Ansan Greeners FC
- Number: 2

Senior career*
Years	Team	Apps	(Gls)
2015–2018	Suwon Samsung Bluewings	6	(1)
2016	→ Busan IPark (loan)	13	(2)
2019–2021	Bucheon FC	64	(1)
2022–	Iwate Grulla Morioka	14	(0)
2024–2025	Daejeon Korail FC		
2026–	Ansan Greeners FC	14	(1)

International career^{‡}
2013	South Korea U21	4	(0)
- * Club domestic league appearances and goals as of 6 August 2026 ‡ National team caps and goals as of 14:44, 1 October 2015 (UTC)

Jang Hyun-soo (Korean: 장현수; born 1 January 1993) is a South Korean footballer who plays for Ansan Greeners FC.
