= Lin Chien-hsun =

Taiwanese footballer

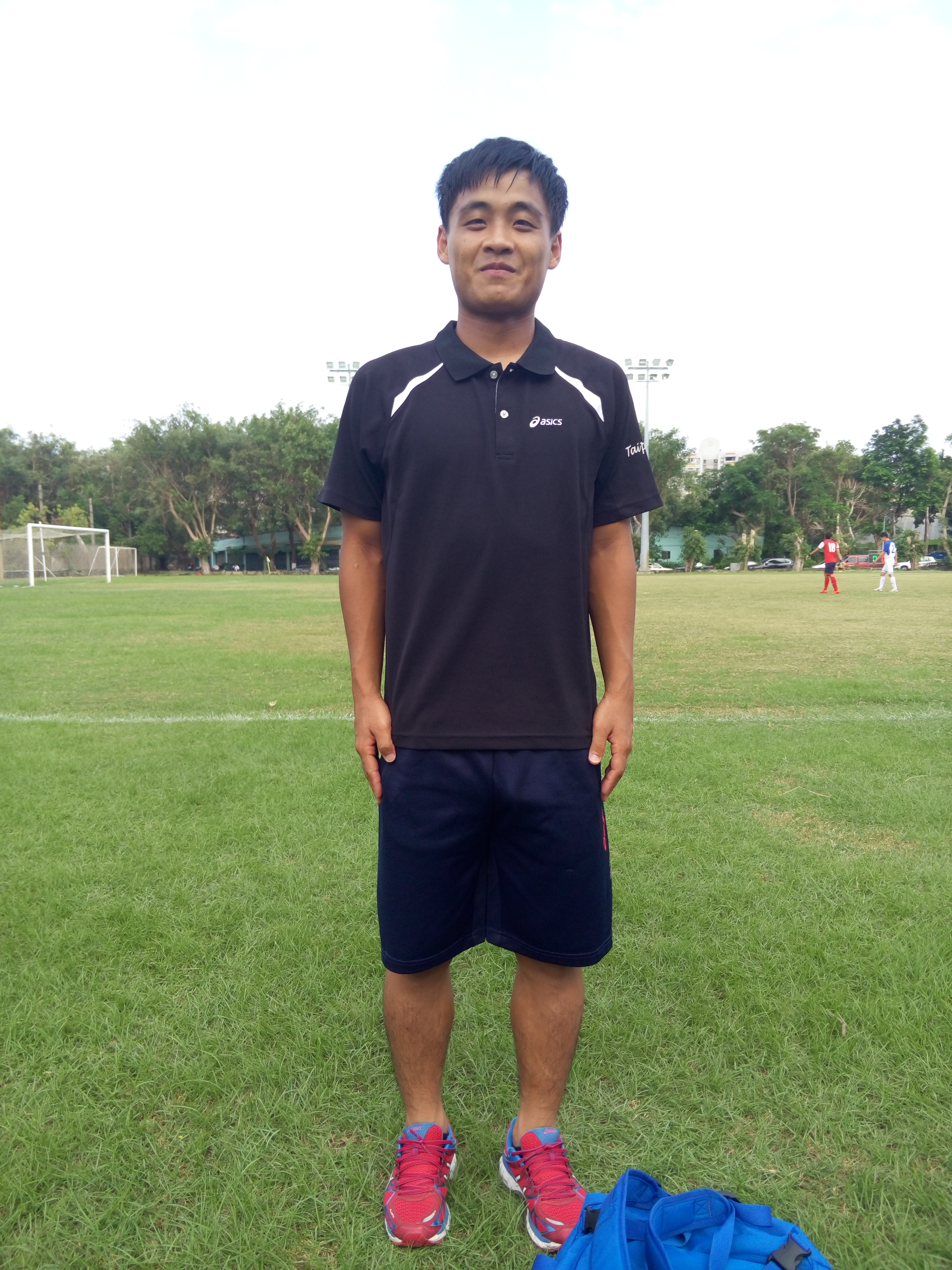
- Lin Chien-hsun in 2015

Personal information
- Date of birth: January 10, 1993 (age 33)
- Place of birth: Tainan, Taiwan
- Height: 1.70 m (5 ft 7 in)
- Position: Attacking midfielder

Team information
- Current team: Taiwan Power Company

Senior career*
Years	Team	Apps	(Gls)
2013–	Taiwan Power Company		

International career^{‡}
2013–	Chinese Taipei	12	(7)
- * Club domestic league appearances and goals ‡ National team caps and goals as of 22 April 2017

Lin Chien-hsun (Chinese: 林建勛; born 10 January 1993) is a Taiwanese footballer who currently plays as an attacking midfielder for the national and club level.

== International goals ==
=== U19 ===
No.	Date	Venue	Opponent	Score	Result	Competition
1.	10 November 2011	Thephasadin Stadium, Bangkok, Thailand	Guam	5–0	11–0	2012 AFC U-19 Championship qualification
2.	10 November 2011	Thephasadin Stadium, Bangkok, Thailand	Guam	7–0	11–0	2012 AFC U-19 Championship qualification
3.	10 November 2011	Thephasadin Stadium, Bangkok, Thailand	Guam	9–0	11–0	2012 AFC U-19 Championship qualification
4.	10 November 2011	Thephasadin Stadium, Bangkok, Thailand	Guam	11–0	11–0	2012 AFC U-19 Championship qualification

=== U23 ===
No.	Date	Venue	Opponent	Score	Result	Competition
1.	23 June 2012	Bogyoke Aung San Stadium, Yangon, Myanmar	Vietnam	1–1	2–1	2013 AFC U-22 Championship qualification

=== National team ===
Scores and results list Chinese Taipei's goal tally first.

No	Date	Venue	Opponent	Score	Result	Competition
1.	30 June 2016	Guam Football Association National Training Center, Dededo, Guam	Northern Mariana Islands	3–0	8–1	2017 EAFF E-1 Football Championship qualification
2.	30 June 2016	Guam Football Association National Training Center, Dededo, Guam	Northern Mariana Islands	6–0	8–1	2017 EAFF E-1 Football Championship qualification
3.	30 June 2016	Guam Football Association National Training Center, Dededo, Guam	Northern Mariana Islands	7–0	8–1	2017 EAFF E-1 Football Championship qualification
4.	30 June 2016	Guam Football Association National Training Center, Dededo, Guam	Northern Mariana Islands	8–1	8–1	2017 EAFF E-1 Football Championship qualification
5.	4 July 2016	Guam Football Association National Training Center, Dededo, Guam	Macau	1–0	3–2	2017 EAFF E-1 Football Championship qualification
6.	4 July 2016	Guam Football Association National Training Center, Dededo, Guam	Macau	2–1	3–2	2017 EAFF E-1 Football Championship qualification
7.	12 November 2016	Mong Kok Stadium, Mong Kok, Hong Kong	Guam	2–0	2–0	2017 EAFF E-1 Football Championship qualification
