= Oyuunbatyn Bayarjargal =

Mongolian footballer

Oyunbat Bayarjargal
Personal information
- Full name: Oyunbat Bayarjargal; Оюунбатын Баяржаргал
- Date of birth: August 16, 1989 (age 37)
- Place of birth: Mongolia
- Height: 1.73 m (5 ft 8 in)
- Position: Midfielder

Team information
- Current team: FC Ulaanbaatar
- Number: 10

Senior career*
Years	Team	Apps	(Gls)
	FC Ulaanbaatar		(108 +)

International career
2013–	Mongolia	10	(4)
- * Club domestic league appearances and goals

Oyuunbatyn Bayarjargal (Mongolian: Оюунбатын Баяржаргал; born 16 August 1989) is a Mongolian international footballer. He made his first appearance for the Mongolia national football team in 2013, when he made a substitute appearance in the first match of 2014 AFC Challenge Cup qualification process.

He was named Mongolia's Player of the Year in 2015.

== International goals ==
Scores and results list Mongolia's goal tally first.

#	Date	Venue	Opponent	Score	Result	Competition
1	30 June 2016	GFA National Training Center, Dededo, Guam	Macau	1–0	2–2	2017 EAFF East Asian Cup
2	30 June 2016	GFA National Training Center, Dededo, Guam	Macau	2–2	2–2	2017 EAFF East Asian Cup
3	4 July 2016	GFA National Training Center, Dededo, Guam	Northern Mariana Islands	1–0	8–0	2017 EAFF East Asian Cup
4	4 July 2016	GFA National Training Center, Dededo, Guam	Northern Mariana Islands	2–0	8–0	2017 EAFF East Asian Cup
Last updated 4 July 2016
