= GFA National Training Center =

Guam Football Association National Training Center
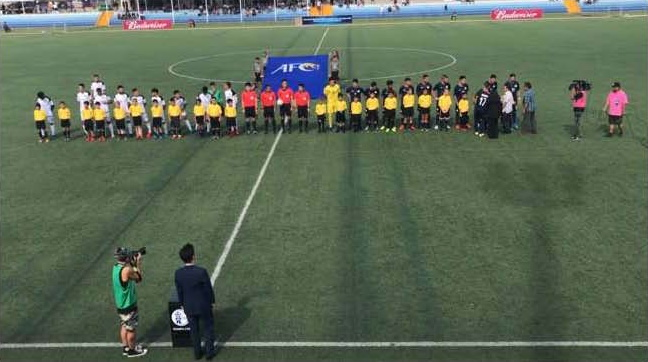
- Interactive map of Guam Football Association National Training Center
- Location: Harmon Loop Road, Dededo, Guam
- Coordinates: 13°30′42.697″N 144°49′51.499″E
- Owner: Guam Football Association
- Capacity: 5,000

Construction
- Groundbreaking: 2014
- Opened: 2015

Tenants
- Guam national football team All Guam football clubs

The Guam Football Association (GFA) National Training Center is an association football venue in Dededo, Guam. The sporting venue can accommodate about 5,000 spectators.

The first World Cup qualifier match held at the sporting venue was held on 11 June 2015. The match was between the men's national teams of Guam and Turkmenistan, with Guam winning 1–0.
