= 2018 Liga Futebol Amadora =

Liga Futebol Amadora
- Season: 2018
- Champions: Primeira: Boavista (1st title); Segunda: Assalam (1st title)
- Promoted: to Primeira: Assalam and Lalenok to Segunda:
- Relegated: from Primeira: Cacusan and DIT from Segunda: Kablaky and Santa Cruz
- AFC Cup: Boavista
- Matches: 122
- Goals: 431 (3.53 per match)
- Top goalscorer: Primeira: Fábio Christian (17 goals); Segunda: Nicolas Izaquel (17 goals)
- Biggest home win: Karketu 10–0 Cacusan (30 June 2018)
- Biggest away win: Cacusan 0–12 Atlético (8 June 2018)
- Highest scoring: Cacusan 0–12 Atlético (8 June 2018)
- Longest winning run: 6 games, Boavista
- Longest unbeaten run: 9 games, Lalenok
- Longest winless run: 14 games, Cacusan
- Longest losing run: 11 games, Cacusan
- All statistics correct as of 4 August 2018.

The 2018 Liga Futebol Amadora is the third season of the Liga Futebol Amadora. The season began on 3 March 2018. The Primeira Divisão began on March 3 and finished on August 5, while the Segunda Divisão began on March 6 and was finished on August 6.

All Primeira Divisão games are played at the Dili Municipal Stadium, Kampo Demokrasia, Baucau Municipal Stadium and Malibaca Yamato Stadium, while all Segunda Divisão games are played at the Kampo Demokrasia. Many top-tier league games took place in front of hundreds of spectators.

== League table ==
=== Primeira ===
Pos	Team	Pld	W	D	L	GF	GA	GD	Pts	Qualification or relegation
1	Boavista (C)	14	10	2	2	33	8	+25	32	
2	Karketu Dili	14	7	4	3	32	16	+16	25	
3	Atlético Ultramar	14	6	4	4	40	16	+24	22	
4	Ponta Leste	14	6	4	4	29	17	+12	22	
5	Benfica Laulara	14	5	7	2	24	16	+8	22	
6	Académica	14	6	1	7	26	34	−8	19	
7	DIT (R)	14	3	3	8	21	29	−8	12	Relegation to the 2019 LFA Segunda
8	Cacusan (R)	14	0	1	13	9	78	−69	1	Relegation to the 2019 LFA Segunda

Updated to match(es) played on 29 July 2018. Source: Liga Futebol Amadora FIFA
Rules for classification: 1) points; 2) goal difference; 3) number of goals scored.
(C) Champions; (R) Relegated

=== Segunda ===
Pos	Team	Pld	W	D	L	GF	GA	GD	Pts	Promotion or relegation
1	Assalam FC (C, P)	11	8	2	1	37	10	+27	26	Promotion to 2019 LFA Primeira
2	Lalenok United (P)	11	8	2	1	30	11	+19	26	Promotion to 2019 LFA Primeira
3	Sporting Clube de Timor	11	6	2	3	24	18	+6	20	
4	FC Zebra	11	6	1	4	19	19	0	19	
5	FC Nagarjo	11	5	2	4	18	19	−1	17	
6	Aitana	11	4	4	3	17	15	+2	16	
7	Lica-Lica Lemorai	11	2	7	2	16	15	+1	13	
8	Fitun Estudante (FIEL)	11	3	3	5	9	14	−5	12	
9	Porto Taibesse	11	3	1	7	14	25	−11	10	
10	FC Lero	11	3	1	7	10	26	−16	10	
11	FC Kablaky (R)	11	1	4	6	11	18	−7	7	Relegated
12	Santa Cruz FC (R)	11	1	3	7	13	27	−14	6	Relegated

Updated to match(es) played on 4 August 2018. Source: Segunda Divisao
Rules for classification: 1) points; 2) goal difference; 3) number of goals scored.
(C) Champions; (P) Promoted; (R) Relegated

== See also ==
- 2018 LFA Primeira
- 2018 LFA Segunda
- 2018 Taça 12 de Novembro
