= 2020 Taça 12 de Novembro =

Tournament details
- Country: Timor Leste
- Dates: 13 November – 12 December 2020
- Teams: 19

Final positions
- Champions: Lalenok United
- Runners-up: SLB Laulara

Tournament statistics
- Matches played: 18
- Goals scored: 73 (4.06 per match)

The 2020 Taça 12 de Novembro is the 8th staging of the Taça 12 de Novembro, the football knockout tournament in East Timor.

The draw for the tournament matches was held on November 9.

== Preliminary round ==
13 November 2020 1	Lalenok United F.C.	5–0	FC Nagarjo	Díli, East Timor
		Report		Stadium: Estádio Campo Democracia; Attendance: 5,000

14 November 2020 1	Assalam FC	2–4	Boavista FC	Díli, East Timor
		Report		Stadium: Estádio Campo Democracia; Attendance: 5,000
Note: Summary of the match in video on the internet:https://www.youtube.com/watch?v=JUv-J_hn8Bk

15 November 2020 1	FC Porto Taibesse	1–1 (2-4 pen)	Aitana FC	Díli, East Timor
	Van Basten 85'	Report	Miguel Araujo 48'	Stadium: Estádio Campo Democracia; Attendance: 5,000
Note: Summary of the match in video on the internet:https://www.youtube.com/watch?v=MOlOMjhsRN8

== Round of 16 ==
17 November 2020 1	AS Marca	0–0 (3-5 pen)	Clube Lica-Lica Lemorai	Díli, East Timor
		Report		Stadium: Estádio Campo Democracia; Attendance: 5,000

18 November 2020 1	DIT FC	3–0	Karketu Dili FC	Díli, East Timor
	José Santos 32' 33'; Venceslau Fátima 56'	Report		Stadium: Estádio Campo Democracia; Attendance: 5,000
Note: Summary of the match in video on the internet:https://www.youtube.com/watch?v=Dq1nZlSETzI

19 November 2020 1	FC FIEL	0–12	Lalenok United F.C.	Díli, East Timor
		Report	Zacarias Cabral 1'; Hermenio Sousa 9'; Lourenço Freitas 13'; Melquior Ribeiro 21'; Daniel Abade 24' 42' 66' & 88'; Santiago Costa 28'; Rufino Gama 1'; Elias Mesquita 81'; Gabio Christian 83'	Stadium: Estádio Campo Democracia; Attendance: 5,000
Note: Summary of the match in video on the internet:https://www.youtube.com/watch?v=pPj8Gh0QIZE

20 November 2020 1	Kablaki FC	0–2	Boavista FC	Díli, East Timor
		Report		Stadium: Estádio Campo Democracia; Attendance: 5,000

21 November 2020 1	AS Ponta Leste	3–3 (3-1 pen)	Aitana FC	Díli, East Timor
	Anizio Correia 41' & 90'; Silverio Garcia 82'	Report	Miguel Araujo 20'; Jilson Reis 59' & 90'	Stadium: Estádio Campo Democracia; Attendance: 5,000
Note: Summary of the match in video on the internet:https://www.youtube.com/watch?v=K1Vjyzqbi4o

22 November 2020 1	Santa Cruz FC	0–2	Emmanuel FC	Díli, East Timor
		Report		Stadium: Estádio Campo Democracia; Attendance: 5,000

24 November 2020 1	Sporting Clube de Timor	6–0	AS Académica	Díli, East Timor
		Report		Stadium: Estádio Campo Democracia; Attendance: 5,000

25 November 2020 1	FC Zebra	0–5	SLB Laulara	Díli, East Timor
		Report		Stadium: Estádio Campo Democracia; Attendance: 5,000

== Quarter-finals ==
26 November 2020 1	Lalenok United F.C.	7-0	Clube Lica-Lica Lemorai	Díli, East Timor
		Report		Stadium: Estádio Campo Democracia; Attendance: 5,000

27 November 2020 1	Emmanuel FC	0–3	Boavista FC	Díli, East Timor
		Report	Pedro Vicente 43'; Danilson Araujo 58'; Rivaldo Correira 92'	Stadium: Estádio Campo Democracia; Attendance: 5,000
Note: Summary of the match in video on the internet:https://www.youtube.com/watch?v=FXNU2pLUHSI

28 November 2020 1	AS Ponta Leste	1-1 (3-5 pen)	DIT FC	Díli, East Timor
		Report		Stadium: Estádio Campo Democracia; Attendance: 5,000

29 November 2020 1	SLB Laulara	4–0	Sporting (Timor)	Díli, East Timor
	Nidio Alves 23'; Jeremias Batista 66' & 91'; João Pedro 81'	Report		Stadium: Estádio Campo Democracia; Attendance: 5,000
Note: Summary of the match in video on the internet:https://www.youtube.com/watch?v=aUdeOHCDVak

== Semi-finals ==
5 December 2020 1	Lalenok United	1–1 (3-2 pen)	Boavista FC	Díli, East Timor
		Report		Stadium: Estádio Campo Democracia; Attendance: 5,000

6 December 2020 2	DIT FC	1–3	SLB Laulara	Díli, East Timor
		Report		Stadium: Estádio Campo Democracia; Attendance: 5,000

== Final ==
12 December 2020 Final	Lalenok United	1–1 (4-1 pen)	SLB Laulara	Díli, East Timor
	Elias Mesquita 6'	Report	Joao Pedro 52'	Stadium: Estádio Campo Democracia; Attendance: 5,000
Note: Summary of the match in video on the internet:https://www.youtube.com/watch?v=oyZbEEorgK4
