= 2017 Taça 12 de Novembro =

Tournament details
- Country: Timor Leste
- Dates: 29 September-28 October 2017
- Teams: 20

Final positions
- Champions: (Manatuto District) Atlético Ultramar
- Runners-up: (Dili District) Carsae

Tournament statistics
- Matches played: 19
- Goals scored: 93 (4.89 per match)
- Top goal scorer: (Brazil) Bernardo Fereira (10 goals)
- All statistics correct as of 28 October 2017.

The 2017 Taça 12 de Novembro is the 5th staging of the Taça 12 de Novembro. The season began on 29 September 2017 and was finished in the final match on 28 October 2017.

Ponta Leste will enter as the defending champions after winning the 2016 edition by defeating Assalam 1–0 in the final.

== Schedule and format ==
Round	Draw date	Date	Fixtures	Clubs	Format details
First round	26 September 2017	29 September-10 October 2017	10	20 → 10	New entries: Clubs participating in 2017 Liga Futebol Amadora Primera Divisao and Segunda Divisao will gain entry. Opponents seeding: Teams will face each other according to proximity criteria. Local team seeding: Draw of lots. Knock-out tournament type: Single match.
Second round	26 September 2017	11-15 October 2017	5	10 → 5	Opponents seeding: Teams will face each other according to proximity criteria. Local team seeding: Draw of lots. Knock-out tournament type: Single match.
Third round	26 September 2017	17 October 2017	1	5 → 4	Byes: three teams will receive a bye. Opponents seeding: Teams will face each other according to proximity criteria. Local team seeding: Draw of lots. Knock-out tournament type: Single match.
Semifinals	26 September 2017	21-22 October 2017	2	4 → 2	Opponents seeding: Draw of lots. Local team seeding: Luck of the draw. Knock-out tournament type: Single match.
Final	26 September 2017	28 October 2017	1	2 → 1	Single match in TBC.

== Stadiums ==
- Primary venues used in the 2017 Taça 12 de Novembro:

Dili
Kampo Demokrasia
Capacity: 1,000

== Qualified teams ==
The following teams are qualified for the competition.

Primera Divisao the 8 teams of the 2017 season	Segunda Divisao the 12 teams of the 2017 season
(Dili District) Académica; (Dili District) Cacusan; (Dili District) Carsae; (Dili District) Karketu Dili; (Dili District) Ponta Leste; (Dili District) Porto Taibesse; (Aileu District) SL Benfica; (Baucau District) Zebra	(Dili District) Aitana; (Dili District) Assalam; (Manatuto District) Atlético Ultramar; (Dili District) Benfica Dili; (Ermera District) Café; (Dili District) DIT; (Manufahi District) Kablaky; (Viqueque District) Lica-Lica Lemorai; (Dili District) Nagarjo; (Dili District) Santa Cruz; (Dili District) Sporting Timor; (Dili District) YMCA

== First round ==
This round match held between 29 September and 10 October 2017. Draw held on 26 September 2017.

Team 1	Score	Team 2
Ponta Leste (Dili District)	8–3	(Dili District) Porto Taibesse
Assalam (Dili District)	1–3	(Dili District) Sporting Timor
Cacusan (Dili District)	11–2	(Dili District) Benfica Dili
Atlético Ultramar (Manatuto District)	3–1	(Manufahi District) Kablaky
SL Benfica (Aileu District)	1–0	(Dili District) Karketu Dili
Aitana (Dili District)	1–3	(Dili District) Nagarjo
DIT (Dili District)	2–2 (a.e.t) (3–1 p)	(Ermera District) Café
Lica-Lica Lemorai (Viqueque District)	2–3	(Dili District) Santa Cruz
Carsae (Dili District)	6–1	(Dili District) Académica
YMCA (Dili District)	0–1	(Baucau District) Zebra

29 September 2017
16:00 (UTC+9)

Ponta Leste (Dili District)	8–3	(Dili District) Porto Taibesse
Quito 3', 9', 27', 45'; Feliciano Goncalves 17', 35'; Silveiro Garcia 57', 81'	Report	Fernando Asmarov 51', 62'; Filipe Borges 84'

Kampo Demokrasia, Dili

30 September 2017
16:00 (UTC+9)

Assalam (Dili District)	1–3	(Dili District) Sporting Timor
	Report

Kampo Demokrasia, Dili

1 October 2017
16:00 (UTC+9)

Cacusan (Dili District)	11–2	(Dili District) Benfica Dili
Frangcyatma Alves 1', 2', 63', 83'; Juvinal Cardoso 8', 35'; Gaudencio Monteiro 10', 41', 81'; Juvinal Boavida 28'; Rufino Gama 60'	Report	Orlando Correa 84'; João Freitas 88'

Kampo Demokrasia, Dili

3 October 2017
16:00 (UTC+9)

Atlético Ultramar (Manatuto District)	3–1	(Manufahi District) Kablaky
Bernardo Fereira 25', 43'; Fábio Christian 87'	Report	Xavier 90+1'

Kampo Demokrasia, Dili
Referee: Apeu Al-Ghozy (East Timor)

4 October 2017
16:00 (UTC+9)

SL Benfica (Aileu District)	1–0	(Dili District) Karketu Dili
Nidio Alves 16'	Report

Kampo Demokrasia, Dili
Referee: Joanico Gama (East Timor)

5 October 2017
16:00 (UTC+9)

Aitana (Dili District)	1–3	(Dili District) Nagarjo
Januario de Jesus 47'	Report	Jose da Costa 46'; Abrão da Costa 77'; Hidetaka Kamimura 80'

Kampo Demokrasia, Dili

6 October 2017
16:00 (UTC+9)

DIT (Dili District)	2–2 (a.e.t)	(Ermera District) Café
Pelazio da Costa 23'; Ricardo Mendonca 33'	Report	Ozorio Gusmão 39', 55'
Penalties
José Santos (penalty missed); Ricardo Mendonca (penalty scored); Joanico Braganza (penalty missed); Mateus Ornay (penalty scored); Pelazio da Costa (penalty scored)	3–1	(penalty scored) Ozorio Gusmão; (penalty missed) António Xavier; (penalty missed) Oldenico; (penalty missed) Alberto dos Santos

Kampo Demokrasia, Dili
Referee: Nivio Fernandes (East Timor)

7 October 2017
16:00 (UTC+9)

Lica-Lica Lemorai (Viqueque District)	2–3	(Dili District) Santa Cruz
Luis Soares 21', 34'	Report	Faustino de Jesus 6'; Aquilis Ximenes 45+1', 61'

Kampo Demokrasia, Dili
Referee: Aniceto Berlelo (East Timor)

8 October 2017
16:00 (UTC+9)

Carsae (Dili District)	6–1	(Dili District) Académica
Edit Savio 3', 29', 78'; Giovanio Alberto 15'; Emílio da Silva 23'; Henrique Cruz 63'	Report	Bendito Ramos 17'

Kampo Demokrasia, Dili

10 October 2017
16:00 (UTC+9)

YMCA (Dili District)	0–1	(Baucau District) Zebra
	Report	Daniel Adade 4'

Kampo Demokrasia, Dili
Referee: Apeu Al-Ghozy (East Timor)

== Second round ==
This round match held between 11 and 15 October 2017. Draw held on 26 September 2017.

Team 1	Score	Team 2
Ponta Leste (Dili District)	1–0	(Dili District) Sporting Timor
Cacusan (Dili District)	2–5	(Manatuto District) Atlético Ultramar
SL Benfica (Aileu District)	1–0	(Dili District) Nagarjo
DIT (Dili District)	3–0	(Dili District) Santa Cruz
Carsae (Dili District)	5–2	(Baucau District) Zebra

11 October 2017
16:00 (UTC+9)

Ponta Leste (Dili District)	1–0	(Dili District) Sporting Timor
Quito 58'	Report

Kampo Demokrasia, Dili
Referee: Nivio Fernandes (East Timor)

12 October 2017
16:00 (UTC+9)

Cacusan (Dili District)	2–5	(Manatuto District) Atlético Ultramar
Frangcyatma Alves 48'; Juvinal Cardoso 90+2'	Report	Bernardo Fereira 18', 84', 90+1', 90+3'; Fábio Christian 36'

Kampo Demokrasia, Dili
Referee: Joanico Gama (East Timor)

13 October 2017
16:00 (UTC+9)

SL Benfica (Aileu District)	1–0	(Dili District) Nagarjo
Nidio Alves 78'	Report

Kampo Demokrasia, Dili
Referee: Apeu Al-Ghozy (East Timor)

14 October 2017
16:00 (UTC+9)

DIT (Dili District)	3–0	(Dili District) Santa Cruz
João Santos 24', 25'; Ricardo Mendonca 34'	Report

Kampo Demokrasia, Dili
Referee: Nivio Fernandes (East Timor)

15 October 2017
16:00 (UTC+9)

Carsae (Dili District)	5–2	(Baucau District) Zebra
Emílio da Silva 15', 57'; Henrique Cruz 17'; Constantinto Pinto 34'; Edit Savio 69'	Report	Daniel Adade 10'; Rivaldo Correa 81'

Kampo Demokrasia, Dili

== Third round ==
This round match held on 17 October 2017. Draw held on 26 September 2017. SL Benfica, DIT and Carsae received a bye.

Team 1	Score	Team 2
Ponta Leste (Dili District)	2–2 (a.e.t) (0–3 p)	(Manatuto District) Atlético Ultramar

17 October 2017
16:00 (UTC+9)

Ponta Leste (Dili District)	2–2 (a.e.t)	(Manatuto District) Atlético Ultramar
Quito 13', 24'	Report	Fábio Christian 58'; Glaucho Trajano 61'
Penalties
Antonio Teles (penalty missed); Jorge Alves (penalty missed); Adelino Trindade (penalty missed)	0–3	(penalty scored) Bernardo Fereira; (penalty scored) Francisco Savio; (penalty scored) Celsio Escurial

Kampo Demokrasia, Dili

== Semifinals ==
This round match held between 21 and 22 October 2017. Draw held on 26 September 2017.

Team 1	Score	Team 2
DIT (Dili District)	1–3	(Dili District) Carsae
Atlético Ultramar (Manatuto District)	1–0	(Aileu District) SL Benfica

21 October 2017
16:00 (UTC+9)

DIT (Dili District)	1–3	(Dili District) Carsae
José Santos 33'	Report	Emílio da Silva 15'; Edit Savio 73', 80'

Kampo Demokrasia, Dili

22 October 2017
16:00 (UTC+9)

Atlético Ultramar (Manatuto District)	1–0	(Aileu District) SL Benfica
Bernardo Fereira 19'	Report

Kampo Demokrasia, Dili
Referee: Joanico Gama (East Timor)

== Final ==
This round match held on 28 October 2017 in Kampo Demokrasia, Dili.

Team 1	Score	Team 2
Carsae (Dili District)	4–7	(Manatuto District) Atlético Ultramar

28 October 2017
15:40

Carsae (Dili District)	4–7	(Manatuto District) Atlético Ultramar
Edit Savio 14', 41', 44'; Emílio da Silva 81'	Report	Bernardo Fereira 10', 33', 85'; Glaucho Trajano 30'; Bernabe Soares 55'; Fábio Christian 79', 84'

Kampo Demokrasia, Dili
Referee: Joanico Gama (East Timor)

== Goalscorers ==
10 goals

- (Brazil) Bernardo Fereira (Atlético Ultramar)

9 goals

- (Timor-Leste) Edit Savio (Carsae)

7 goals

- (Timor-Leste) Chiquito do Carmo (Ponta leste)

5 goals

- (Brazil) Fábio Christian (Atlético Ultramar)
- (Timor-Leste) Frangcyatma Alves (Cacusan)
- (Timor-Leste) Emílio da Silva (Carsae)

3 goals

- (Timor-Leste) Juvinal Cardoso (Cacusan)
- (Timor-Leste) Gaudencio Monteiro (Cacusan)

2 goals

- (Brazil) Glaucho Trajano (Atlético Ultramar)
- (Timor-Leste) Ozorio Gusmão (Café)
- (Timor-Leste) Henrique Cruz (Carsae)
- (Timor-Leste) Ricardo Mendonca (DIT)
- (Timor-Leste) Luis Soares (Lica-Lica Lemorai)
- (Timor-Leste) Silveiro Garcia (Ponta leste)
- (Timor-Leste) Feliciano Goncalves (Ponta leste)
- (Timor-Leste) Fernando Asmarov (Porto Taibesse)
- (Timor-Leste) Aquilis Ximenes (Santa Cruz)
- (Timor-Leste) Nidio Alves (SL Benfica)
- (Ghana) Daniel Adade (Zebra)

1 goals

- (Timor-Leste) Bendito Ramos (Académica)
- (Timor-Leste) Januario de Jesus (Aitana)
- (Timor-Leste) Bernabe Soares (Atlético Ultramar)
- (Timor-Leste) Orlando Correa (Benfica Dili)
- (Timor-Leste) João Freitas (Benfica Dili)
- (Timor-Leste) Juvinal Boavida (Cacusan)
- (Timor-Leste) Rufino Gama (Cacusan)
- (Timor-Leste) Giovanio Alberto (Carsae)
- (Timor-Leste) Constantinto Pinto (Carsae)
- (Timor-Leste) Pelazio da Costa (DIT)
- (Timor-Leste) João Santos (DIT)
- (Timor-Leste) José Santos (DIT)
- (Timor-Leste) Xavier (Kablaky)
- (Timor-Leste) Abrão da Costa (Nagarjo)
- (Timor-Leste) Jose da Costa (Nagarjo)
- (Japan) Hidetaka Kamimura (Nagarjo)
- (Timor-Leste) Filipe Borges (Porto Taibesse)
- (Timor-Leste) Faustino de Jesus (Santa Cruz)
- (Timor-Leste) Rivaldo Correa (Zebra)
