= 2019 Taça 12 de Novembro =

Tournament details
- Country: Timor Leste
- Dates: 12 April – 12 October 2019
- Teams: 20

Final positions
- Champions: Lalenok United
- Runners-up: SLB Laulara

Tournament statistics
- Matches played: 19
- Goals scored: 74 (3.89 per match)
- All statistics correct as of 7 April 2021.

The 2019 Taça 12 de Novembro is the 7th staging of the Taça 12 de Novembro, the football knockout tournament in East Timor.

The draw was held on 12 April 2019.

== Preliminary round ==
7 May 2019 1	Atlético Ultramar	4–1	FC Zebra	Díli, East Timor
		Report		Stadium: National Stadium (East Timor); Attendance: 5,000

14 May 2019 1	Aitana FC	3–2	FC Nagarjo	Díli, East Timor
		Report		Stadium: National Stadium (East Timor); Attendance: 5,000

21 May 2019 1	FC Lica-Lica Lemorai	4–1	Sporting (Timor)	Díli, East Timor
		Report		Stadium: National Stadium (East Timor); Attendance: 5,000

28 May 2019 1	FC FIEL	0–2	Boavista (Timor)	Díli, East Timor
		Report		Stadium: National Stadium (East Timor); Attendance: 5,000

== Round of 16 ==
3 July 2019 1	Atlético Ultramar	2–0	FC Porto Taibesse	Díli, East Timor
		Report		Stadium: National Stadium (East Timor); Attendance: 5,000

10 July 2019 1	Lalenok United	3–1	Karketu Dili FC	Díli, East Timor
		Report		Stadium: National Stadium (East Timor); Attendance: 5,000

17 July 2019 1	Assalam FC	9–1	Cacusan CF	Díli, East Timor
		Report		Stadium: National Stadium (East Timor); Attendance: 5,000

24 July 2019 1	Aitana FC	2–1	AS Ponta Leste	Díli, East Timor
		Report		Stadium: National Stadium (East Timor); Attendance: 5,000

31 July 2019 1	Lica-Lica Lemorai	2–1	AS Lero	Díli, East Timor
		Report		Stadium: National Stadium (East Timor); Attendance: 5,000

7 August 2019 1	Santa Cruz FC	0–6	SLB Laulara	Díli, East Timor
		Report		Stadium: National Stadium (East Timor); Attendance: 5,000

14 August 2019 1	DIT FC	0–1	AS Académica	Díli, East Timor
		Report		Stadium: National Stadium (East Timor); Attendance: 5,000

21 August 2019 1	Boavista (Timor)	5–2	Kablaki FC	Díli, East Timor
		Report		Stadium: National Stadium (East Timor); Attendance: 5,000

== Quarter-finals ==
28 August 2019 1	Atlético Ultramar	0-1*	Lalenok United F.C.	Díli, East Timor
		Report		Stadium: National Stadium (East Timor); Attendance: 5,000
Note: [abandoned at 0–1 in 58', Ultramar walked off; awarded to Lalenok]

4 September 2019 1	Assalam FC	3–0	Aitana FC	Díli, East Timor
		Report		Stadium: National Stadium (East Timor); Attendance: 5,000

18 September 2019 1	AS Académica	1-2	Boavista (Timor)	Díli, East Timor
		Report		Stadium: National Stadium (East Timor); Attendance: 5,000

19 September 2019 1	Lica-Lica Lemorai	0–3	SLB Laulara	Díli, East Timor
		Report		Stadium: National Stadium (East Timor); Attendance: 5,000

== Semi-finals ==
5 October 2019 1	Lalenok United	2–2 (4-2 pen)	Assalam FC	Díli, East Timor
		Report		Stadium: National Stadium (East Timor); Attendance: 5,000

6 October 2019 2	SLB Laulara	1–1 (5-4 pen)	Boavista (Timor)	Díli, East Timor
		Report		Stadium: National Stadium (East Timor); Attendance: 5,000

== Final ==
12 October 2019 Final	Lalenok United	3–2	SLB Laulara	Díli, East Timor
	Elias Misquita 48, Francisko da Costa 68, Italo Pimental 90+1;	Report	Mouzinho de Lima 13, Paulo Gali 30	Stadium: National Stadium (East Timor); Attendance: 5,000
