= 2018 Taça 12 de Novembro =

Tournament details
- Country: Timor Leste
- Dates: 26 September – 27 October 2018
- Teams: 20

Final positions
- Champions: (Manatuto District) Atlético Ultramar
- Runners-up: (Dili District) Assalam FC

Tournament statistics
- Matches played: 19
- Goals scored: 95 (5 per match)

The 2018 Taça 12 de Novembro is the 6th staging of the Taça 12 de Novembro. The season began on 26 September 2018 and was finished in the final match on 20 October 2018.

The draw of the tournament was held on 22 September 2018.

== Teams ==
A total of 20 teams compete in the tournament: eight teams from 2018 LFA Primeira and twelve teams from 2018 LFA Segunda.

== Preliminary round ==
Sep 26	(Manatuto District) Atlético Ultramar	11–2	Santa Cruz (Dili District)
		Report

Sep 27	(Dili District) Académica	0–0 (1–2 p)	Boavista FC (Dili District)
				Referee: http://www.rsssf.com/tableso/oosttim2018.html

Sep 28	(Dili District) Cacusan CF	1–12	Karketu Dili (Dili District)
		Report

Sep 29	(Baucau District) Zebra	2–1	Lica-Lica Lemorai (Viqueque District)
		Report

== Round of 16 ==
Sep 30	(Dili District) DIT FC	3–2	Nagarjo (Dili District)
		Report

Oct 2	(Dili District) Porto Taibesse	0–5	SLB Laulara (Aileu District)
		Report

Oct 3	(Manufahi District) Kablaki FC	0–3	Ponta Leste (Dili District)
		Report

Oct 4	(Dili District) Lalenok United F.C.	3–1	FC FIEL (Dili District)
		Report

Oct 5	(Dili District) Aitana FC	3–1	Sporting Timor (Dili District)
		Report

Oct 6	(Dili District) Assalam	3–1	AS Lero (Lautém District)
		Report

Oct 7	(Manatuto District) Atlético Ultramar	2–2 (4–3 p)	Boavista (Dili District)
		Report

Oct 16	(Dili District) Karketu Dili	1–0	Zebra (Baucau District)
		Report

== Quarter-finals ==
Oct 12	(Dili District) Aitana FC	0–4	Assalam FC (Dili District)
		Report

Oct 17	(Dili District) DIT FC	1–5	SLB Laulara (Aileu District)
		Report

Oct 18	(Dili District) AS Ponta Leste	5—3	Lalenok United F.C. (Dili District)

Oct 20	(Manatuto District) Atlético Ultramar	2–1	Karketu Dili (Dili District)
		Report

== Semi-finals ==
Oct 23	(Dili District) Assalam FC	2–2 (7–6 p)	AS Ponta Leste (Dili District)
		Report

Oct 24	(Aileu District) SLB Laulara	1–5	Atlético Ultramar (Manatuto District)
		Report

== Final ==
27 October 2018 Final	(Manatuto District) Atlético Ultramar	3–2	Assalam FC (Dili District)	(Dili District) Díli, (Timor-Leste) East Timor
	(Brazil) Bernardo Freire 11' & 35' (Timor-Leste) Eusebio de Almeida 39'	Report	Ramiro Maggi (Timor-Leste) 19'; Nicolas Altamira (Timor-Leste) 47'	Stadium: Kampo FFTL, Demokrasia, Dili; Attendance: 5,000; Referee: (Timor-Leste) Pedro Maia de Carvalho
