= 2016 Taça 12 de Novembro =

Tournament details
- Country: Timor Leste
- Dates: 4 August-10 September 2016
- Teams: 21

Final positions
- Champions: AS Ponta Leste
- Runners-up: Assalam F.C.

Tournament statistics
- Matches played: 20
- Goals scored: 61 (3.05 per match)
- Top goal scorer(s): Lourenco Ximenes (Ponta Leste, 4 goals)
- All statistics correct as of 10 September 2016.

The 2016 Taça 12 de Novembro is the 4th staging of the Taça 12 de Novembro.

Aitana will enter as the defending champions after winning the 2015 edition by defeating Dili Institute of Technology (DIT) 3-2 in the final.

Ponta Leste won the title this season after beating Assalam 1-0 in the final.

== Schedule and format ==
Round	Draw date	Date	Fixtures	Clubs	Format details
First round	22 July 2016	4-19 August 2016	10	21 → 11	New entries: Clubs participating in 2016 Liga Futebol Amadora Primera Divisao and Segunda Divisao will gain entry. Byes: one teams will receive a bye. Opponents seeding: Teams will face each other according to proximity criteria. Local team seeding: Draw of lots. Knock-out tournament type: Single match.
Second round	22 July 2016	20-27 August 2016	5	11 → 6	Byes: one teams will receive a bye. Opponents seeding: Teams will face each other according to proximity criteria. Local team seeding: Draw of lots. Knock-out tournament type: Single match.
Third round	22 July 2016	28 August-1 September 2016	2	6 → 4	Byes: two teams will receive a bye. Opponents seeding: Teams will face each other according to proximity criteria. Local team seeding: Draw of lots. Knock-out tournament type: Single match.
Semifinals	22 July 2016	3-4 September 2016	2	4 → 2	Opponents seeding: Draw of lots. Local team seeding: Luck of the draw. Knock-out tournament type: Single match.
Final	22 July 2016	10 September 2016	1	2 → 1	Single match in Municipal Stadium.

== Qualified teams ==
The following teams are qualified for the competition.

Primera Divisao the 8 teams of the 2016 season	Segunda Divisao the 13 teams of the 2016 season
Aitana; Académica; Carsae; DIT; Karketu Dili; Ponta Leste; Porto Taibesse; SL Benfica	Assalam; Atlético Ultramar; Benfica Dili; Cacusan; Café; Kablaky; Lica-Lica Lemorai; Nagarjo; Santa Cruz; Sporting Timor; União; YMCA; Zebra

== First round ==
This round match held between 4 and 19 August 2016. Benfica Dili received a bye.

Team 1	Score	Team 2
Aitana	2-1	Zebra
Nagarjo	0-1	SL Benfica
YMCA	2-0	Sporting Timor
Assalam	3-1	União
Carsae	0-1	Karketu Dili
Café	2-7	DIT
Kablaky	1-1 (5-4 p)	Santa Cruz
Académica	3-1	Lica-Lica Lemorai
Porto Taibesse	0-3	Ponta Leste
Atlético Ultramar	0-2	Cacusan

== Second round ==
This round match held between 20 and 27 August 2016. Cacusan received a bye.

Team 1	Score	Team 2
Aitana	0-1	SL Benfica
YMCA	0-2	Assalam
Karketu Dili	3-0	Benfica Dili
DIT	10-1	Kablaky
Académica	0-1	Ponta Leste

== Third round ==
This round match held between 28 August to 1 September 2016. DIT and SL Benfica receive a bye.

Team 1	Score	Team 2
Assalam	1-0	Karketu Dili
Ponta Leste	2-2 (4-2 p)	Cacusan

== Semifinals ==
The semifinals held between 3 and 4 September 2016.

Team 1	Score	Team 2
SL Benfica	1-3	Assalam
DIT	1-2	Ponta Leste

3 September 2016	SL Benfica	1–3	Assalam	Dili
19:00	Gumario 87'	Report	Gonzalez 12'; Masrudin 22'; Agostu 79'	Stadium: Municipal Stadium

4 September 2016	DIT	1–2	Ponta Leste	Dili
16:00	Gaudencio 7'	Report	Tokunaga 23'; Garcia 86'	Stadium: Municipal Stadium

== Final ==
The final held on 10 September 2016 in Municipal Stadium.

Team 1	Score	Team 2
Assalam	0-1	Ponta Leste

10 September 2016	Assalam	0–1	Ponta Leste	Dili
16:00		Report	Garcia 60'	Stadium: Municipal Stadium; Referee: Zelasio da Silva
