= List of futsal clubs in Timor-Leste =

This is the list of futsal clubs in East Timor.

== Pra Liga Futsal Timor-Leste ==
The teams set to compete in the 2020–21 season of the Pra Liga Futsal Timor-Leste are:

- Academica FC
- Boavista FC
- Mauputar FC
- Maudoko FC
- Baucau All Star
- FC Bermeta
- Kuda Ulun FC
- Kablaki FC
- Boa Sorte FC
- FC FIEL
- FC Gamer
- Jerman FC
- Becusse United
- FC Estrela Baguia
- Sai Francisco Xavier FC
- Santa Cruz FC
- Caesar Dante FC
- Crazy Horse
- AD Samoro
- Ramelau FC
- FC B’Tal
- FC Coelho
- M-VDL FC
- Mushila FC
