= 2017 LFA Segunda =

Second season of the Liga Futebol Amadora Segunda Divisão

Segunda Divisaun
- Season: 2017
- Champions: Atlético Ultramar
- Promoted: DIT; Atlético Ultramar
- Relegated: Benfica Dili; Café; União; YMCA
- Matches played: 73
- Goals scored: 292 (4 per match)
- Top goalscorer: (Timor-Leste) José Santos (16 goals)
- Biggest home win: DIT 9–1 Kablaky (7 April 2017); Lica-Lica 8–0 União (17 August 2017)
- Biggest away win: Benfica Dili 0–6 Nagarjo (25 April 2017); YMCA 1–7 Atl. Ultramar (15 August 2017)
- Highest scoring: DIT 8–3 Santa Cruz (4 April 2017)
- Longest winning run: 6 games, Assalam
- Longest unbeaten run: 10 games, Nagarjo
- Longest winless run: 10 games, Benfica Dili
- Longest losing run: 5 games, Benfica Dili
- All statistics correct as of 22 September 2017.

The 2017 LFA Segunda is the second season of the Liga Futebol Amadora Segunda Divisão. The season began on March 7 and was finished in the Final match on September 22.

All Segunda Divisão games are played at the Dili Municipal Stadium and Kampo Demokrasia only used for Final match on September 22.

Cacusan CF is the last season champions and got promoted to 2017 LFA Primeira.

== Stadiums ==
Primary venues used in the 2017 LFA Segunda

Stadium	Location	Capacity
Municipal Stadium	Dili	5,000
Kampo Demokrasia	Dili	1,000

== Teams ==
There are 13 teams that will play this season.

=== from Segunda ===
Cacusan and FC Zebra promoted to 2017 Primeira Divisao after securing place as champions and runners-up in 2016 Segunda Divisao.

=== to Segunda ===
Aitana and DIT F.C. were relegated to 2017 Segunda Divisao after finished 7th and bottom place of 2016 Primeira Divisao.

=== Locations ===
Locations of the 2017 LFA Segunda

=== Personnel ===
Club	City / Area	Coach	Captain
Aitana	Dili		
Assalam	Nafatin, Dili		(Chile) Christian Peña
Atlético Ultramar	Manatuto	(Indonesia) Rudi Susanto	(Brazil) Glauco Trajano
Kablaky	Same, Manufahi	(Timor-Leste) Joao Paulo	
Café	Ermera	(Timor-Leste) Joao Araujo	
D.I.T.	Dili	(Timor-Leste) Manuel Pinto da Costa	(Timor-Leste) José Santos
Lica-Lica Lemorai	Viqueque	Gregorio Correa	(Timor-Leste) Pedro Gomes
Nagarjo	Dili		(Timor-Leste) Marnivio
Santa Cruz	Dili	(Timor-Leste) Jojo Campos	(Timor-Leste) Sarmento
Sport Dili e Benfica	Dili		
Sporting Clube de Timor	Dili		
União de Timor	Dili		
YMCA	Dili		

== Foreign players ==
Restricting the number of foreign players strictly to four per team. A team could use four foreign players on the field each game.

As of 13 July 2017

Club	Player 1	Player 2	Player 3	Player 4
Aitana				
Assalam	(Chile) Christian Peña	(Chile) Cristian Carrasco	(Indonesia) Markus Haris Maulana	(Indonesia) Nasrudin Almasih
Atlético Ultramar	(Brazil) Glauco	(Brazil) Fábio Christian	(Brazil) Bernardo Fereira	(Indonesia) Muhammad Reza
Kablaky	(Indonesia) Rizal Nurdin			
FC Café				
DIT F.C.				
Lica-Lica Lemorai				
Nagarjo	(Ghana) Izaquel Kofi Moniz	(Japan) Hidetaka Kamimura	(Indonesia) Roland Simons	(Philippines) Ricky N.
Santa Cruz	(Indonesia) Muhamad Nasrudin Noer	(Indonesia) Ikris Yambi		
Sport Dili e Benfica				
Sporting Clube de Timor				
União de Timor				
YMCA FC				

== Group A ==
Pos	Team	Pld	W	D	L	GF	GA	GD	Pts	Promotion or relegation	DIT	NGO	SCZ	KAB	CAF	SDB
1	DIT F.C. (P, A)	10	8	1	1	48	12	+36	25	Promotion to 2018 LFA		0–3	8–3	9–1	4–0	7–0
2	Nagarjo	10	6	4	0	27	8	+19	22		2–2		0–0	5–0	3–2	4–1
3	Santa Cruz	10	5	2	3	18	17	+1	17		1–2	0–0		2–1	1–0	1–0
4	Kablaky	10	3	2	5	14	27	−13	11		1–6	1–2	2–1		1–1	0–0
5	Café (R)	10	2	2	6	14	30	−16	8	Relegated	1–5 (Note: FC Kablaky awarded 5–0 win after FC Café walked off in minute 78 with score 2–1 for Kablaky on 24 August 2017.)	2–2	3–7	0–5		4–2
6	Sport Dili e Benfica (R)	10	0	1	9	5	32	−27	1	Relegated	0–5	0–6	1–2	1–2	0–1	

Updated to match(es) played on 24 August 2017. Source: Segunda Divisao Group A
Rules for classification: 1) points; 2) goal difference; 3) number of goals scored.
(A) Advance to Final; (P) Promoted; (R) Relegated

== Group B ==
Pos	Team	Pld	W	D	L	GF	GA	GD	Pts	Promotion or relegation	ATU	ASL	LLL	AIT	SCT	YMCA	UNI
1	Atlético Ultramar (P, A)	12	10	1	1	37	12	+25	31	Promotion to 2018 LFA		2–1	1–0	4–3	2–0	1–0	4–2
2	Assalam	12	9	1	2	33	11	+22	28		2–1		2–0	5–3	3–0	7–0	2–0
3	Lica-Lica Lemorai	12	6	3	3	29	16	+13	21		1–5	1–1		1–1	5–1	3–0	8–0
4	Aitana	12	5	2	5	21	24	−3	17		1–4	0–1	1–3		2–1	2–1	3–1
5	Sporting Clube de Timor	12	2	3	7	17	24	−7	9		1–1	3–1	1–2	0–0		1–2	3–4
6	YMCA FC (East Timor) (R)	12	2	3	7	14	34	−20	9	Relegated	1–7	0–4	2–2	1–2	1–1		3–3
7	União de Timor (R)	12	1	1	10	13	46	−33	4	Relegated	0–5 (Note: Atlético Ultramar awarded 5–0 win after União de Timor forfeited match on 22 August 2017.)	1–4	0–3	0–3	1–5	1–3	

Updated to match(es) played on 26 August 2017. Source: Segunda Divisao Group B
Rules for classification: 1) points; 2) goal difference; 3) number of goals scored.
(A) Advance to Final; (P) Promoted; (R) Relegated

== Final ==
22 September 2017
16:00

Atlético Ultramar	2–0	DIT
Bernardo Fereira 8'; Fábio Cristian 72'	Report

Kampo Demokrasia, Dili

== Season statistics ==
As of matches played on 22 September 2017.

Top scorers
Rank	Player	Club	Goals
1	(Timor-Leste) José Santos	DIT	16
2	(Indonesia) Nasrudin Almasih	Assalam	14
3	(Brazil) Fábio Cristian	Atlético Ultramar	12
4	(Timor-Leste) Nelson Adelino	Lica-Lica Lemorai	11
5	(Timor-Leste) Joanico Braganza	DIT	9
6	(Brazil) Bernardo Fereira	Atlético Ultramar	7
6	(Timor-Leste) Dominggos Pires	Sporting Clube de Timor	7
8	(Chile) Christian Peña	Assalam	6
9	(Timor-Leste) Liborio Pereira	FC Café	5
9	(Timor-Leste) Abrao da Costa	Nagarjo	5
9	(Indonesia) Roland Simons	Nagarjo	5
9	(Timor-Leste) Silvestre Gama	União	5
13	(Timor-Leste) Gilson Reis	Aitana	4
13	(Chile) Cristian Carrasco	Assalam	4
13	(Timor-Leste) Boaventura Soares	DIT	4
13	(Timor-Leste) Chelsio Garcia	DIT	4
13	(Timor-Leste) Ricardo Mendoca	DIT	4
13	(Timor-Leste) Apolonario de Jesus	Nagarjo	4
13	(Timor-Leste) Rosito Correa	União	4

== See also ==
- 2017 LFA Primeira
- 2017 Taça 12 de Novembro
- 2017 LFA Super Taça
- 2017 LFA Segunda Divisao Promotion Playoff
