= Daniel Adade =

Ghana-born East Timorese footballer

Personal information
- Full name: Daniel Adade
- Date of birth: 4 April 1995 (age 31)
- Place of birth: Accra, Ghana
- Height: 1.80 m (5 ft 11 in)
- Position: Forward

Youth career
- 2007–2008: Saturn F.C.
- 2008–2010: Accra Rangers

Senior career*
Years	Team	Apps	(Gls)
2014–2016	Istanbul		
2014	→ CSV Bochum (loan)		
2016–2017	Dreams		
2017–2018	Zebra Baucau		
2018–2019	Karketu Dili		
2019	Assalam		
2020–2022	Lalenok United		
2022–2023	Assalam		
2023–2025	Benfica Macau		
2025	Karketu Dili		
2025	Persipal Palu	4	(1)
- * Club domestic league appearances and goals as of 5 October 2025

Daniel Adade (born 4 April 1995) is a Ghanaian professional footballer who plays as a forward.

== Club career ==
=== Early career ===
Born on 4 April 1995, in the city of Accra, Ghana, Daniel Adade started playing football on the Saturn F.C. team, where in 2007 and 2008 he played in the second division.

In 2008, he left Saturn and went to play the second division for Accra Rangers, where he remained until 2010. In 2010, he signed a contract with Istanbul F.C., where he stayed until 2014, when he was loaned to CSV Bochum.

=== Dreams F.C. ===
In 2016, Adade signed a contract with Dreams and debuted in the Ghana Premier League (first division of Ghana).

=== East Timor ===
In 2016, Adade left the African continent and went to venture into Southeast Asia.

The first Timorese club in which Adade served was Zebra Baucau from the city of Baucau, and also played for Karketu Dili, where he had a quick passage between 2016 and 2017. In 2018 he returned to his country to defend the colors of Dreams, with whom he still had contractual ties.

He returned to Timor to compete for the Liga Futebol Amadora by the Assalam team. His style of playing and scoring goals drew the attention of the other Timorese teams.

His style of playing and scoring goals helped the Assalam to win the 2018 LFA Segunda title and get promoted to Liga Futebol Amadora Primeira Divisão.

In 2019 he was the top scorer in the 2019 LFA Primeira, scoring 12 goals in 14 games for Assalam.

In 2020, he joined Lalenok United to compete as the club sought to bolster their squad ahead of their 2020 AFC Cup campaign. Daniel scored a goal in the 2nd minute of their first match against PSM Makassar in the Qualifying play-off round, however Lalenok would end up losing the tie 2–7 on aggregate across the two legs.

While playing for Lalenok United Daniel would also win the 2020 Copa FFTL competition, drawing a penalty in the final that would lead to the game-winning goal being scored in a 2–1 victory against SLB Laulara. In the following season he would be the joint top scorer of the Primeira Divisão, with Lalenok finishing 2nd in the league.

In 2025 he would return to Timor-Leste, rejoining Karketu Dili, where he would win the Liga Futebol Timor-Leste Primeira Divisão.

=== Persipal Palu ===
In August 2025, he signed with Indonesian club Persipal Palu.

== International career ==
In 2015, he was shortlisted to play for his country's national team in the under-20 world cup in New Zealand, but ended up suffering an injury and was cut.
