= Anizo Correia =

Timorese footballer

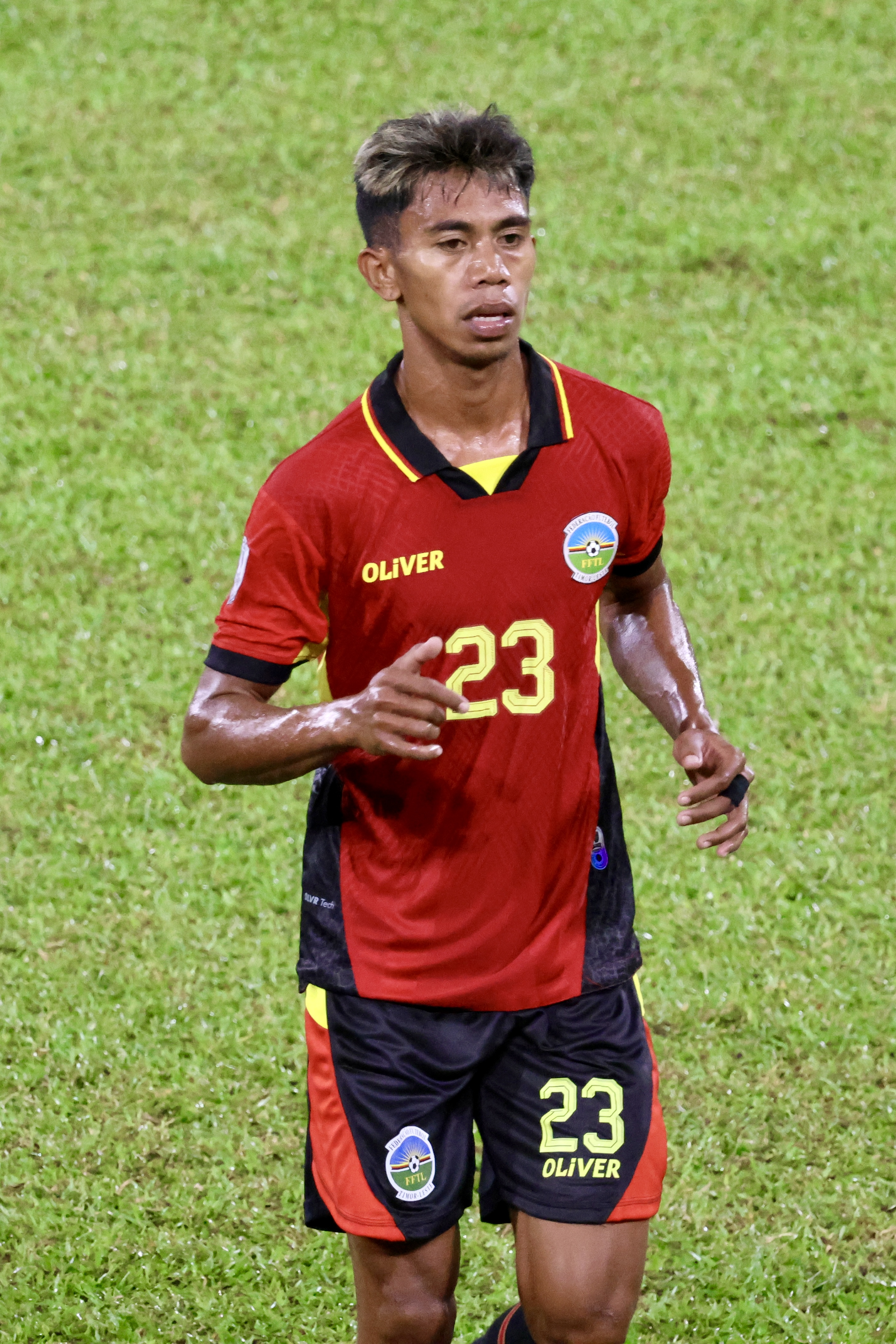
- Correia with Timor-Leste in 2024

Personal information
- Full name: Anizo Correia
- Date of birth: 23 May 2003 (age 23)
- Place of birth: Motaulun, Timor-Leste
- Height: 1.75 m (5 ft 9 in)
- Positions: Centre-back; striker

Team information
- Current team: San Antonio

Senior career*
Years	Team	Apps	(Gls)
2017–2018	Liquiçá		
2019	Lero		
2019–2024	Ponta Leste		
2024	Pyeongchang United	0	(0)
2025–2026	Ponta Leste		
2026	Karketu Dili		
2026–	San Antonio		

International career^{‡}
2021–	Timor-Leste U23	7	(0)
2021–	Timor-Leste	26	(0)
- * Club domestic league appearances and goals ‡ National team caps and goals as of 3 August 2026

Anizo Correia (born 23 May 2003) is a Timorese footballer who plays for Segunda Divisão club AD San Antonio and captains the Timor-Leste national team.

== Club career ==
=== Liquiçá ===
Correia started his career at Liquiçá of the Segunda Divisão until 2018.

=== FC Lero ===
In 2018, Correia moved to league rivals FC Lero.

=== Ponta Leste ===
In 2019, Correia moved to Timor-Leste successful club, Ponta Leste of the Primeira Divisão.

=== Pyeongchang United ===
After playing for five years at Ponta Leste, Correia was scouted by fourth tier Korean side, Pyeongchang United. In March 2024, he officially joined the K4 League club.

=== Ponta Leste ===
In 2025, Correia returned to Timor-Leste to play for Ponta Leste of the Primeira Divisão.

== International career ==
In October 2021, Correia represented Timor-Leste in 2022 AFC U-23 Asian Cup qualification. He made two appearances for the team during the group stage.

Two months later, on 14 December 2021, he went on to make his senior international debut for Timor-Leste in the 2020 AFF Championship match against Singapore.

On 28 May 2022, Correia scored his first international goal in a friendly match against Nepal.

=== International career statistics ===
As of match played 3 August 2026

Timor-Leste
Year	Apps	Goals
2021	1	0
2022	5	0
2023	2	0
2024	7	0
2025	6	0
2026	5	0
Total	26	0

No	Date	Venue	Opponent	Score	Result	Competition
1.	28 May 2022	Grand Hamad Stadium, Doha, Qatar	Nepal	2–0	2–2	Friendly
