= 2018 LFA Segunda =

LFA Segunda
- Season: 2018
- Dates: 6 March – 4 August 2018
- Champions: Assalam (1st title)
- Promoted: Assalam; Lalenok
- Relegated: Kablaky; Santa Cruz
- Matches: 66
- Goals: 217 (3.29 per match)
- Top goalscorer: Nicolas Izaquel (17 goals)
- Biggest home win: Kablaky 6–0 Santa Cruz (19 June 2018)
- Biggest away win: Porto 0–5 Assalam (5 May 2018); FIEL 0–5 Lalenok (4 August 2018)
- Highest scoring: Lero 2–6 Assalam (25 April 2018)
- Longest winning run: 5 games, Assalam
- Longest unbeaten run: 9 games, Lalenok
- Longest winless run: 9 games, Santa Cruz
- Longest losing run: 5 games, Porto; Santa Cruz
- All statistics correct as of 4 August 2018.

The 2018 LFA Segunda is the third season of the Liga Futebol Amadora Segunda Divisão. The season began on March 6 and finished on August 6.

Atlético Ultramar is the last season champions and got promoted to 2018 LFA Primeira.

Assalam won their first LFA Segunda title, after a 5–1 win over Nagarjo in their last match on 19 July 2018.

Assalam won their first promotion to 2019 LFA Primeira, with one match to spare following a 4–0 win over Lalenok United on 28 June 2018. Lalenok United won their first promotion to LFA Primeira, with one match to spare following their competitor Sporting only playing a 1–1 draw against Lica-Lica on 17 July 2018.

Santa Cruz became the first team to be relegated from LFA Segunda after losing 2–3 in their last match against Zebra on 31 July 2018. Kablaky became the second team to be relegated after losing 1–2 in their last match against Porto on 2 August 2018, while Porto with their victory managed to save them from relegation.

== Teams ==
There are 12 teams that will play this season.

=== from Segunda Divisaun ===
Atlético Ultramar and DIT F.C. promoted to 2018 LFA Primeira after securing place as champions and runners-up in 2017 Segunda Divisao. FC Café and Sport Dili e Benfica were relegated from 2017 Segunda Divisao after finished 5th and bottom place of Group A, while YMCA FC and União de Timor were relegated from 2017 Segunda Divisao after finished 6th and bottom place of Group B.

=== to Segunda Divisaun ===
FC Zebra and Porto Taibesse were relegated to 2018 LFA Segunda after finished 7th and bottom place of 2017 Primeira Divisao. Fitun Estudante (FIEL), Lalenok United and FC Lero promoted to 2018 LFA Segunda after win the playoff tournament.

=== Locations ===
Locations of the 2018 LFA Segunda teams.

=== Personnel ===
Club	City / Area	Coach	Captain
Aitana	Dili		(Timor-Leste) Migi
Assalam	Nafatin, Dili		
Fitun Estudante (FIEL)	Dili	(Timor-Leste) Arsenio Afonsu	(Timor-Leste) Sabino Pereira
Kablaki	Same, Manufahi	(Timor-Leste) Joao Godinho	
Lalenok United	Dili	(Timor-Leste) Jantje Matmey	(Timor-Leste) Florencio Pereira
Lero	Lospalos, Lautém	(Timor-Leste) Carlito	(Timor-Leste) Elkio Pinto
Lica-Lica Lemorai	Viqueque	(Timor-Leste) Octavianus Alves	(Timor-Leste) Pepe
Nagarjo	Dili	(Brazil) Ricardo Madeiros	(Timor-Leste) Marnivio da Costa
Porto Taibesse	Dili		
Santa Cruz	Dili	(Timor-Leste) Jojo Campos	(Timor-Leste) Raimundo Sarmento
Sporting Clube de Timor	Dili		
FC Zebra	Baucau	(Timor-Leste) Rogerio Mock	(Timor-Leste) Januario Ximenes

=== Managerial changes ===
Club(s)	Outgoing manager	Manner of departure	Date of vacancy	Position in table	Incoming Manager	Date of appointment
Lica-Lica Lemorai	(Timor-Leste) Gregorio Correa	End of contract	December 2017	Pre-season	(Timor-Leste) Octavianus Alves	January 2018
Nagarjo	unknown	End of contract	December 2017	Pre-season	(Brazil) Ricardo Madeiros	29 January 2018
Porto Taibesse	(Timor-Leste) Miro Baldo Bento	Signed by Boavista Timor	January 2018	Pre-season		January 2018
Lalenok United	(Timor-Leste) Mohammad Nico	End of contract	January 2018	Pre-season	(Timor-Leste) Jantje Matmey	January 2018

=== Stadiums ===
- Primary venues used in the 2018 LFA Segunda:

Dili
Kampo Demokrasia
Capacity: 1,000

== Foreign players ==
Restricting the number of foreign players strictly to four per team. A team could use four foreign players on the field each game.

As of 26 February 2018

Club	Player 1	Player 2	Player 3	Player 4
Aitana				
Assalam	(Argentina) Nicolas Izaquel	(Argentina) Ramiro Nelson	(Chile) Christian Peña	
Fitun Estudante (FIEL)				
Kablaky	(Indonesia) Rizal Nurdin			
Lalenok United	(Brazil) Filipi Santos	(Brazil) Italo	(Brazil) Matheus Silva	(Ghana) Agbozo Nathaniel
FC Lero				
Lica-Lica Lemorai	(Ghana) Ezequiel Moniz			
Nagarjo	(Ghana) Collins Samoah	(Ghana) Yusuf Al-Hasan	(Indonesia) Fernando Asmuruf	(Japan) Hidetaka Kamimura
Porto Taibesse	(Cameroon) Tassiou Bako			
Santa Cruz	(Indonesia) Nasrudin Noer	(Indonesia) Ikris Yambi		
Sporting Clube de Timor				
FC Zebra	(Ghana) Devis Amegashie	(Ghana) Mohamed Momin		

== League table ==
Pos	Team	Pld	W	D	L	GF	GA	GD	Pts	Promotion or relegation
1	Assalam FC (C, P)	11	8	2	1	37	10	+27	26	Promotion to 2019 LFA Primeira
2	Lalenok United (P)	11	8	2	1	30	11	+19	26	Promotion to 2019 LFA Primeira
3	Sporting Clube de Timor	11	6	2	3	24	18	+6	20	
4	FC Zebra	11	6	1	4	19	19	0	19	
5	FC Nagarjo	11	5	2	4	18	19	−1	17	
6	Aitana	11	4	4	3	17	15	+2	16	
7	Lica-Lica Lemorai	11	2	7	2	16	15	+1	13	
8	Fitun Estudante (FIEL)	11	3	3	5	9	14	−5	12	
9	Porto Taibesse	11	3	1	7	14	25	−11	10	
10	FC Lero	11	3	1	7	10	26	−16	10	
11	FC Kablaky (R)	11	1	4	6	11	18	−7	7	Relegated
12	Santa Cruz FC (R)	11	1	3	7	13	27	−14	6	Relegated

Updated to match(es) played on 4 August 2018. Source: Segunda Divisao
Rules for classification: 1) points; 2) goal difference; 3) number of goals scored.
(C) Champions; (P) Promoted; (R) Relegated

== Result table ==
Home \ Away	AIT	ASL	FIEL	KAB	LNU	FCL	LLL	NGO	POR	SCZ	SCT	ZEB
Aitana FC		2–2	1–0		0–0	1–2	1–1		1–2	4–2		
Assalam F.C.			1–2	4–1			1–1	5–1		4–0	2–0	3–1
FC Fitun Estudante Lorosae				0–0	0–5		1–1	1–2		0–0		
FC Kablaky	1–1				0–0			0–0		6–0	2–3	0–3
Lalenok United		0–4				6–1	4–1	3–1	4–1	3–2	2–1	
FC Lero		2–6	0–1	1–0			0–0			1–4		1–3
FC Lica-Lica Lemorai				4–0				2–2	3–2	1–1	1–1	
FC Nagarjo	1–2					1–0						
FC Porto Taibesse		0–5	1–0	2–1		1–2		1–3				1–2
Santa Cruz Futebol Clube Dili								1–2	1–1		0–2	2–3
Sporting Clube de Timor	1–3		3–2			3–0		4–2	4–2			2–2
FC Zebra	3–1		0–2		0–3		2–1	0–3				

Updated to match(es) played on 4 August 2018. Source: Liga Futebol Amadora
Legend: Blue = home team win; Yellow = draw; Red = away team win.

== Fixtures and results ==
All matches played every Tuesday to Sunday every week except the final league match, which was played on Monday 6 August 2018.

=== Week 1 ===
6 March 2018	Lalenok United	6–1	Lero	Dili
16:00 (UTC+9)	Italo 11', 24', 27', 43', 55'; Elkio Pinto 22' (o.g.)	Report	Agustino 56'	Stadium: Kampo Demokrasia; Referee: Joanico Nycolas Gama

7 March 2018	FIEL	0–0	Kablaki	Dili
16:00 (UTC+9)		Report		Stadium: Kampo Demokrasia; Referee: Nivio Da Costa Fernandes

=== Week 2 ===
13 March 2018	Aitana	2–2	Assalam	Dili
16:00 (UTC+9)	Bozan 62'; Migi 69'	Report	Ozorio Gusmão 87', 90'	Stadium: Kampo Demokrasia; Referee: Pedro Carvalho

14 March 2018	Sporting	4–2	Nagarjo	Dili
16:00 (UTC+9)	Ermenio Sousa 32'; Marito do Santos 52', 77'; Yohanes Marques 90+1'	Report	Yusuf Al Hasan 18'; Collins Samoah 59'	Stadium: Kampo Demokrasia

15 March 2018	Lica-Lica	1–1	Santa Cruz	Dili
16:00 (UTC+9)	Clementino da Silva 83'	Report	Januari Cabral 89'	Stadium: Kampo Demokrasia; Referee: Nivio Da Costa Fernandes

16 March 2018	Porto	1–2	Zebra	Dili
16:00 (UTC+9)	Frederico Silva 18'	Report	Daniel Adade 34'; Januari Ximenes 43'	Stadium: Kampo Demokrasia

17 March 2018	Aitana	1–0	FIEL	Dili
16:00 (UTC+9)	Bozan 72'	Report		Stadium: Kampo Demokrasia

18 March 2018	Assalam	4–1	Kablaki	Dili
16:00 (UTC+9)	Ramiro Nelson 11', 17'; Nicolas Izaquel 84', 90+4'	Report	Pedro Soares 38'	Stadium: Kampo Demokrasia

=== Week 3 ===
20 March 2018	Lalenok United	4–1	Lica-Lica	Dili
16:00 (UTC+9)	Italo 10', 64'; Matheus Silva 22'; Miguel Bareto 44' (o.g.)	Report	Florencio Pereira 82' (o.g.)	Stadium: Kampo Demokrasia; Referee: Nivio Da Costa Fernandes

=== Week 4 ===
3 April 2018	Lero	1–4	Santa Cruz	Dili
16:00 (UTC+9)	Joni Pinto 45+1'	Report	Aquilis Ximenes 23'; Liborio de Jesus 38'; Ivaldo Pereira 78'; Raimundo Sarmento 90+3' (pen.)	Stadium: Kampo Demokrasia

4 April 2018	Zebra	0–3	Nagarjo	Dili
16:00 (UTC+9)		Report	Yusuf Al-Hasan 40'; Hidetaka Kamimura 63'; Fernando Asmuruf 79'	Stadium: Kampo Demokrasia

=== Week 5 ===
10 April 2018 (Note: The match originally took place on 5 April 2018.)	Sporting	4–2	Porto	Dili
16:00 (UTC+9)	Marito do Santos 1'; Yohanes Marques 11', 48'; Dominggos Pereira 58'	Report	Sergio Xavier 43'; Frederico Silva 60'	Stadium: Kampo Demokrasia; Referee: Nivio Da Costa Fernandes

11 April 2018 (Note: The match originally took place on 18 April 2018.)	Kablaki	1–1	Aitana	Dili
16:00 (UTC+9)	Pedro Soares 26' (pen.)	Report	Gilson Reis 47' (pen.)	Stadium: Kampo Demokrasia

=== Week 6 ===
17 April 2018	Lica-Lica	3–2	Porto	Dili
16:00 (UTC+9)	Deonizio da Costa 7' (pen.), 37'; Nelson Soares 42'	Report	Frederico Silva 27'; Claudio Araujo 77' (pen.)	Stadium: Kampo Demokrasia

18 April 2018 (Note: The match originally took place on 8 April 2018.)	Nagarjo	1–2	Aitana	Dili
16:00 (UTC+9)	Fernando Asmuruf 34'	Report	Bozan 53', 69' (pen.)	Stadium: Kampo Demokrasia

19 April 2018 (Note: The match originally took place on 7 April 2018.)	Assalam	1–2	FIEL	Dili
16:00 (UTC+9)	Nicolas Izaquel 10'	Report	Guido da Silva 30', 37'	Stadium: Kampo Demokrasia

21 April 2018 (Note: The match originally took place on 6 April 2018.)	Lalenok United	3–2	Santa Cruz	Dili
16:00 (UTC+9)	Italo 16'; Elias Mesquita 18'; Elias Sanches 46'	Report	Cornelio Moc 31'; Raimundo Sarmento 83'	Stadium: Kampo Demokrasia

22 April 2018 (Note: The match originally took place on 24 April 2018.)	Porto	1–3	Nagarjo	Dili
16:00 (UTC+9)	Mário Correia 35'	Report	Sebastiao do Carmo 4'; Abrao Ribeiro 17'; Apolonario de Jesus 83'	Stadium: Kampo Demokrasia

=== Week 7 ===
24 April 2018 (Note: The match originally took place on 1 May 2018.)	Aitana	0–0	Lalenok United	Dili
16:00 (UTC+9)		Report		Stadium: Kampo Demokrasia

25 April 2018 (Note: The match originally took place on 3 May 2018.)	Lero	2–6	Assalam	Dili
16:00 (UTC+9)	Alexandrino Sanches 28'; Elkio Pinto 63'	Report	Ramiro Nelson 14', 70', 90'; Nicolas Izaquel 19', 46', 75'	Stadium: Kampo Demokrasia

26 April 2018 (Note: The match originally took place on 19 April 2018.)	FIEL	1–1	Lica-Lica	Dili
16:00 (UTC+9)	Alito da Cruz 56'	Report	Ezequiel Moniz 10'	Stadium: Kampo Demokrasia

27 April 2018 (Note: The match originally took place on 2 May 2018.)	Santa Cruz	0–2	Sporting	Dili
16:00 (UTC+9)		Report	Yohanes Marques 29'; Marito do Santos 90+1'	Stadium: Kampo Demokrasia

28 April 2018 (Note: The match originally took place on 4 May 2018.)	Kablaki	0–3	Zebra	Dili
16:00 (UTC+9)		Report	Bakayoko Ozo 30', 60'; Bona Ventura 38'	Stadium: Kampo Demokrasia

29 April 2018 (Note: The match originally took place on 5 May 2018.)	Lalenok United	3–1	Nagarjo	Dili
16:00 (UTC+9)	Matheus Silva 8', 72'; Elias Mesquita 36'	Report	Melchior Ribeiro 90+1'	Stadium: Kampo Demokrasia

=== Week 8 ===
1 May 2018 (Note: The match originally took place on 6 May 2018.)	Aitana	1–2	Lero	Dili
16:00 (UTC+9)	Bozan 70'	Report	Febriano Madeira 38' (pen.); Agustino 87'	Stadium: Kampo Demokrasia

2 May 2018 (Note: The match originally took place on 22 May 2018.)	Lica-Lica	4–0	Kablaki	Dili
16:00 (UTC+9)	Deonizio da Costa 5'; Miguel Mascarenhas 34'; David Silva 61', 81'	Report		Stadium: Kampo Demokrasia

3 May 2018 (Note: The match originally took place on 23 May 2018.)	FIEL	0–0	Santa Cruz	Dili
16:00 (UTC+9)		Report		Stadium: Kampo Demokrasia

4 May 2018 (Note: The match originally took place on 24 May 2018.)	Sporting	2–2	Zebra	Dili
16:00 (UTC+9)	Marito do Santos 45'; Yohanes Marques 89'	Report	Mohamed Momin 7'; Daniel Adade 90+3' (pen.)	Stadium: Kampo Demokrasia

5 May 2018 (Note: The match originally took place on 29 May 2018.)	Porto	0–5	Assalam	Dili
16:00 (UTC+9)		Report	Nicolas Izaquel 2', 45+1'; Ozorio Gusmão 56', 90+1'; Ramiro Nelson 90+3'	Stadium: Kampo Demokrasia

6 May 2018 (Note: The match originally took place on 30 May 2018.)	Nagarjo	1–0	Lero	Dili
16:00 (UTC+9)	Hidetaka Kamimura 75'	Report		Stadium: Kampo Demokrasia

=== Week 9 ===
8 May 2018 (Note: The match originally took place on 1 June 2018.)	Lalenok United	2–1	Sporting	Dili
16:00 (UTC+9)	Italo 2'; Matheus Silva 62'	Report	Yohanes Marques 36'	Stadium: Kampo Demokrasia

=== Week 10 ===
16 May 2018 (Note: The match originally took place on 2 June 2018.)	Assalam	3–1	Zebra	Dili
16:00 (UTC+9)	Ramiro Nelson 23'; Nicolas Izaquel 47'; Filipe Borges 73'	Report	Imanuel de Jesus 36'	Stadium: Kampo Demokrasia

=== Week 11 ===
21 May 2018 (Note: The match originally took place on 10 April 2018 than rescheduled to 20 April 2018 when match was postponed.)	Sporting	3–0	Lero	Dili
16:00 (UTC+9)	Marito do Santos 52', 73'; Yohanes Marques 72'	Report		Stadium: Kampo Demokrasia

22 May 2018 (Note: The match originally took place on 3 June 2018.)	Santa Cruz	1–1	Porto	Dili
16:00 (UTC+9)	Aquilis Ximenes 33'	Report	Nelvio Almeida 77'	Stadium: Kampo Demokrasia

23 May 2018 (Note: The match originally took place on 5 June 2018.)	Kablaki	0–0	Lalenok United	Dili
16:00 (UTC+9)		Report		Stadium: Kampo Demokrasia

24 May 2018 (Note: The match originally took place on 12 June 2018.)	Lica-Lica	2–2	Nagarjo	Dili
16:00 (UTC+9)	David Silva 36'; Miguel Mascarenhas 87'	Report	Hidetaka Kamimura 37'; Yusuf Al-Hasan 45' (pen.)	Stadium: Kampo Demokrasia

=== Week 12 ===
29 May 2018 (Note: The match originally took place on 13 June 2018.)	Lero	1–3	Zebra	Dili
16:00 (UTC+9)	Alexandrino Sanches 85'	Report	Mohamed Momin 30'; Devis Amegashie 74', 78'	Stadium: Kampo Demokrasia

30 May 2018 (Note: The match originally took place on 14 June 2018.)	Assalam	4–0	Santa Cruz	Dili
16:00 (UTC+9)	Nicolas Izaquel 28', 50'; Ramiro Nelson 38'; Ozorio Gusmão 88'	Report		Stadium: Kampo Demokrasia

1 June 2018 (Note: The match originally took place on 27 June 2018.)	Lalenok United	4–1	Porto	Dili
16:00 (UTC+9)	Jose Gomes 17' (o.g.); Matheus Silva 23'; Elias Mesquita 43', 86'	Report	Vencislao Guterres 89'	Stadium: Kampo Demokrasia

2 June 2018 (Note: The match originally took place on 26 June 2018.)	Zebra	0–2	FIEL	Dili
16:00 (UTC+9)		Report	Guido da Silva 22'; Filomeno Savio 64'	Stadium: Kampo Demokrasia

3 June 2018 (Note: The match originally took place on 28 June 2018.)	Santa Cruz	1–2	Nagarjo	Dili
16:00 (UTC+9)	Faustino de Jesus 83'	Report	Jeff Boateng 53'; Abrao Ribeiro 58'	Stadium: Kampo Demokrasia

=== Week 13 ===
4 June 2018 (Note: The match originally took place on 31 May 2018.)	Aitana	1–1	Lica-Lica	Dili
16:00 (UTC+9)	Miguel da Silva 15'	Report	David Silva 19'	Stadium: Kampo Demokrasia

5 June 2018 (Note: The match originally took place on 6 July 2018.)	Lero	1–0	Kablaki	Dili
16:00 (UTC+9)	Denus Cardoso 15'	Report		Stadium: Kampo Demokrasia

6 June 2018 (Note: The match originally took place on 4 July 2018.)	Zebra	0–3	Lalenok United	Dili
16:00 (UTC+9)		Report	Italo 21', 56'; Matheus Silva 34'	Stadium: Kampo Demokrasia

=== Week 14 ===
12 June 2018 (Note: The match originally took place on 5 July 2018.)	Assalam	1–1	Lica-Lica	Dili
16:00 (UTC+9)	David Silva 57' (o.g.)	Report	Miguel Bareto 10'	Stadium: Kampo Demokrasia

13 June 2018 (Note: The match originally took place on 3 July 2018.)	Sporting	3–2	FIEL	Dili
16:00 (UTC+9)	Marito do Santos 10'; Lexi Careca 41'; Yohanes Marques 51'	Report	Guido da Silva 34', 72'	Stadium: Kampo Demokrasia

14 June 2018 (Note: The match originally took place on 7 July 2018.)	Aitana	1–2	Porto	Dili
16:00 (UTC+9)	Miguel da Silva 58'	Report	Octavio Misquita 14'; Vanceslao Guterres 18'	Stadium: Kampo Demokrasia

=== Week 15 ===
19 June 2018 (Note: The match originally took place on 8 July 2018.)	Kablaki	6–0	Santa Cruz	Dili
16:00 (UTC+9)	Rosito Soares 16'; Rudolfo Mateus 22', 66'; Silvestre Gama 77', 90+1'; Pedro Soares 82'	Report		Stadium: Kampo Demokrasia

20 June 2018 (Note: The match originally took place on 10 July 2018.)	Assalam	2–0	Sporting	Dili
16:00 (UTC+9)	Nicolas Izaquel 13', 50'	Report		Stadium: Kampo Demokrasia

=== Week 16 ===
25 June 2018 (Note: The match originally took place on 19 June 2018.)	Kablaki	2–3	Sporting	Dili
16:00 (UTC+9)				Stadium: Kampo Demokrasia

26 June 2018 (Note: The match originally took place on 17 July 2018.)	FIEL	1–2	Nagarjo	Dili
16:00 (UTC+9)	Guido da Silva 30'	Report	Abrao Ribeiro 4'; Cipriano Branco 90'	Stadium: Kampo Demokrasia

27 June 2018 (Note: The match originally took place on 18 July 2018, the order of match also changed from originally Lero was home team.)	Porto	1–2	Lero	Dili
16:00 (UTC+9)	Marcos de Jesus 45'	Report	Joni Pinto 63'; Jaemito Martins 89'	Stadium: Kampo Demokrasia

28 June 2018 (Note: The match originally took place on 31 July 2018.)	Lalenok United	0–4	Assalam	Dili
16:00 (UTC+9)		Report	Ozorio Gusmão 33'; Nicolas Izaquel 67'; Ramiro Nelson 74'; Leto Ramos 88'	Stadium: Kampo Demokrasia

=== Week 17 ===
3 July 2018 (Note: The match originally took place on 24 July 2018.)	Zebra	2–1	Lica-Lica	Dili
16:00 (UTC+9)	Mohamed Momin 22' (pen.); Bona Ventura 30'	Report	Deonizio da Costa 90+1'	Stadium: Kampo Demokrasia

4 July 2018 (Note: The match originally took place on 26 July 2018.)	Kablaki	0–0	Nagarjo	Dili
16:00 (UTC+9)				Stadium: Kampo Demokrasia

=== Week 18 ===
10 July 2018 (Note: The match originally took place on 25 July 2018. Match order also changed.)	Porto	1–0	FIEL	Dili
16:00 (UTC+9)	Lazio Piadade 59'	Report		Stadium: Kampo Demokrasia

11 July 2018 (Note: The match originally took place on 27 July 2018.)	Aitana	4–2	Santa Cruz	Dili
16:00 (UTC+9)	Bozan 10', 45+2'; Ronaldo Maia 11'; Gilson Reis 51'	Report	Jackson Baptista 83'; Samuel Correia 90'	Stadium: Kampo Demokrasia

=== Week 19 ===
17 July 2018 (Note: The match originally took place on 28 July 2018.)	Lica-Lica	1–1	Sporting	Dili
16:00 (UTC+9)				Stadium: Kampo Demokrasia

18 July 2018 (Note: The match originally took place on 29 July 2018.)	Lero	0–1	FIEL	Dili
16:00 (UTC+9)		Report	Deonizio da Silva 59'	Stadium: Kampo Demokrasia

19 July 2018 (Note: The match originally took place on 3 August 2018.)	Assalam	5–1	Nagarjo	Dili
16:00 (UTC+9)	Nicolas Izaquel 20', 32', 60'; Filipe da Cruz 45'; Ramiro Nelson 54'	Report	Mario da Costa 74'	Stadium: Kampo Demokrasia

=== Week 20 ===
24 July 2018 (Note: The match originally took place on 19 July 2018, match order also changed.)	Zebra	3–1	Aitana	Dili
16:00 (UTC+9)	Mohamed Momin 55', 73', 80'	Report	Miguel da Silva 33'	Stadium: Kampo Demokrasia

=== Week 21 ===
31 July 2018 (Note: The match originally took place on 2 August 2018.)	Santa Cruz	2–3	Zebra	Dili
16:00 (UTC+9)	Raimundo Sarmento 2', 81' (pen.)	Report	Mohamed Momin 30', 67', 86' (pen.)	Stadium: Kampo Demokrasia

1 August 2018	Sporting	1–3	Aitana	Dili
16:00 (UTC+9)	Marito do Santos 83'	Report	Bozan 7'; Jacinto de Carvalho 15'; Ramailho Gama 76'	Stadium: Kampo Demokrasia

2 August 2018 (Note: The match originally took place on 4 August 2018.)	Porto	2–1	Kablaki	Dili
16:00 (UTC+9)	Octavio Misquita 27'; Marcos de Jesus 30'	Report	Oligario Nunes 58'	Stadium: Kampo Demokrasia

3 August 2018 (Note: The match originally took place on 5 August 2018.)	Lero	0–0	Lica-Lica	Dili
16:00 (UTC+9)		Report		Stadium: Kampo Demokrasia

4 August 2018 (Note: The match originally took place on 6 August 2018.)	FIEL	0–5	Lalenok United	Dili
16:00 (UTC+9)		Report	Italo 7', 17', 31'; Elias Mesquita 33', 55'	Stadium: Kampo Demokrasia

== Season statistics ==
=== Top scorers ===
As of matches played on 4 August 2018.

Rank	Player	Club	Goals
1	(Argentina) Nicolas Izaquel	Assalam	17
2	(Brazil) Italo	Lalenok United	14
3	(Argentina) Ramiro Nelson	Assalam	11
4	(Timor-Leste) Marito do Santos	Sporting	9
4	(Ghana) Mohamed Momin	Zebra	9
6	(Timor-Leste) Yohanes Marques	Sporting	8
6	(Timor-Leste) Bozan	Aitana	8
8	(Timor-Leste) Ozorio Gusmão	Assalam	6
8	(Timor-Leste) Guido da Silva	Fitun Estudante	6
8	(Timor-Leste) Elias Mesquita	Lalenok United	6
8	(Brazil) Matheus Silva	Lalenok United	6
12	3 players		4
15	6 players		3
21	16 players		2
37	44 players		1

=== Hat-tricks ===
As of matches played on 4 August 2018.

Player	For	Against	Result	Date
(Brazil) Italo^{5}	Lalenok United	FC Lero	6-1 (H)	6 March 2018
(Argentina) Ramiro Nelson	Assalam	FC Lero	6-2 (A)	25 April 2018
(Argentina) Nicolas Izaquel	Assalam	FC Lero	6-2 (A)	25 April 2018
(Argentina) Nicolas Izaquel	Assalam	Nagarjo	5-1 (H)	19 July 2018
(Ghana) Mohamed Momin	Zebra	Aitana	3-1 (H)	24 July 2018
(Ghana) Mohamed Momin	Zebra	Santa Cruz	3-2 (A)	31 July 2018
(Brazil) Italo	Lalenok United	FIEL	5-0 (A)	4 August 2018

Notes:
(H) – Home; (A) – Away
^{5} – player scorer 5 goals

=== Clean sheets ===
As of matches played on 4 August 2018.

Rank	Player	Club	Clean sheets
1	(Timor-Leste) Frangenio da Cruz	Assalam	4
1	(Timor-Leste)	FIEL	4
1	(Timor-Leste)	Kablaki	4
1	(Ghana) Agbozo Nathaniel	Lalenok United	4
5	(Timor-Leste) Calestino Pinto	Nagarjo	3
6	(Timor-Leste)	Aitana	2
6	(Timor-Leste)	Sporting	2
6	(Timor-Leste) Romico Meneses	FC Lero	2
6	(Timor-Leste)	Lica-Lica Lemorai	2
10	(Timor-Leste)	Porto	1
10	(Timor-Leste)	Santa Cruz	1
10	(Timor-Leste)	FC Zebra	1

=== Own goals ===
As of matches played on 4 August 2018.

Rank	Player	For	Against	Date	Goals
1	(Timor-Leste) Elkio Pinto	Lalenok	FC Lero	6 March 2018	1
1	(Timor-Leste) Miguel Bareto	Lalenok	Lica-Lica	20 March 2018	1
1	(Timor-Leste) Florencio Pereira	Lica-Lica	Lalenok	20 March 2018	1
1	(Timor-Leste) Jose Gomes	Porto	Lalenok	1 June 2018	1
1	(Timor-Leste) David Silva	Assalam	Lica-Lica	12 June 2018	1

== See also ==
- 2018 LFA Primeira
- 2018 Taça 12 de Novembro
