= 2019 LFA Primeira =

Primeira Divisaun
- Season: 2019
- Dates: 27 April –29 September
- Champions: Lalenok United
- Relegated: Académica; Atlético Ultramar
- Matches: 56
- Goals: 203 (3.63 per match)
- Top goalscorer: Daniel Adadi (12 goals)
- Biggest home win: Assalam 5–1 Atlético Ultramar (24 August 2019); AS Académica 5–1 Atlético Ultramar (21 September 2019)
- Biggest away win: AS Académica 2–5 Lalenok United (3 August 2019)
- Highest scoring: 7 goals AS Académica 2–5 Lalenok United (3 August 2019)
- Longest winning run: 3 matches Ponta Leste
- Longest unbeaten run: 4 matches Boavista
- Longest winless run: 5 matches Karketu Dili
- Longest losing run: 4 matches AS Académica
- All statistics correct as of 17 April 2021.

The 2019 LFA Primeira is the fourth season of the Liga Futebol Amadora Primeira Divisão. The season scheduled began on April 27 and finished on September 29.

Boavista is the current defending champions.

== Teams ==
There are 8 teams that played this season.

=== Champions ===
Team	Location	Stadium	Capacity
Lalenok United F.C.	Dili	Municipal Stadium	5,000

=== from Primeira ===
DIT F.C. and Cacusan were relegated to 2019 LFA Segunda after finished 7th and bottom place of 2018 LFA Primeira.

=== to Primeira ===
Assalam and Lalenok United promoted to 2019 LFA Primeira after securing place as champions and runners-up in 2018 LFA Segunda.

=== Locations ===
Locations of the 2018 LFA Primera teams

=== Personnel and kits ===
Club	City / Area	Coach	Captain	Kit manufacturer	Shirt sponsor	Other sponsor	Owner
Académica	Dili	(Malaysia) Andi Sutanto		Iurai			(Timor-Leste) UNTL
Assalam	Dili	(Indonesia) Pudji Handoko		Oweltee	iANA		(Timor-Leste) Ipolito Soares
Atlético Ultramar	Manatuto	(Timor-Leste) Francisco da Costa	(Brazil) Glauco Trajano	BLK			(Timor-Leste) Eugenio Gusmão
Boavista	Dili	(Portugal) Fabiano Flora	(Timor-Leste) Henrique Cruz	Nike	npm	MoneyGram	(Timor-Leste) José Ramos-Horta
Karketu Dili	Dili	(Timor-Leste) Antonio Timotio	(Timor-Leste) Boavida Olegario	Fitsee		Obrai Unip Lda. Tanjung Motor; Emanuel Residence; East Gas Corp. Britas Lda. LCF Creative	(Timor-Leste) Jose Adilson Ribeiro
Lalenok United	Dili	(Indonesia) Jantje Matmey	(Timor-Leste) Florencio Pereira	Cemile	Bintang Beer		(Timor-Leste) Pedro Belo
Ponta Leste	Dili	(Timor-Leste) Eduardo Pereira		Umbro			
Benfica	Laulara, Aileu	(Timor-Leste) Juliao Monteiro	(Timor-Leste) Nidio Alves	BLK	TL-cement		(Timor-Leste) Xanana Gusmão

=== Managerial changes ===
Club(s)	Outgoing manager	Manner of departure	Date of vacancy	Position in table	Incoming Manager	Date of appointment
Académica	(Timor-Leste) Asala	End of Contract	27 October 2018	Pre-season	(Malaysia) Andi Sutanto	1 March 2019
Karketu	(Moldova) Arcan Iurie	End of contract	30 October 2018	Pre-season	(Timor-Leste) Antonio Timotio	10 April 2019
Benfica	(South Korea) Kim Shin-hwan	End of contract	30 November 2018	Pre-season	(Timor-Leste) Juliao Monteiro	10 April 2019
Boavista	(Chile) Eladio Rojas	End of contract	30 November 2018	Pre-season	(Portugal) Fabiano Flora	10 April 2019
Atletico Ultramar	(Malaysia) Andi Sutanto	Signed by Académica	1 March 2019	Pre-season	(Timor-Leste) Francisco da Costa	1 March 2019
Atletico Ultramar	(Timor-Leste) Francisco de Araujo	Sacked	31 May 2019	Mid-season	(Indonesia) Pudji Handoko	31 May 2019

=== Stadiums ===
- Primary venues used in the 2019 LFA Primera:

Stadium	Location	Capacity
Baucau Municipal Stadium	(Baucau District) Baucau	5,000
Municipal Stadium	Dili	5,000
Malibaca Yamato Stadium	(Bobonaro District) Maliana	5,000

== Foreign players ==
Restricting the number of foreign players strictly to five per team. A team could use four foreign players on the field each game. Name on BOLD was foreign players who registered in mid-season transfer window.

Club	Player 1	Player 2	Player 3	Player 4	Player 5
Académica					
Assalam	(Ghana) Boateng	(Ghana) Daniel Adadi	(Indonesia) Julian Mancini	(Indonesia) Saddam Sudarma	(Indonesia) Helmi Sandi
Atlético Ultramar	(Brazil) Bernardo Freire	(Brazil) Fábio Christian	(Brazil) Glauco		
Boavista	(Brazil) Antonio Jackson	(Brazil) Marcelo Reis	(Brazil) Rafael Marti		
Karketu Dili	(Indonesia) Melkianus Wakerkwa	(Indonesia) Naftali Heluka	(Indonesia) Yance Wenda		
Lalenok United	(Brazil) Igor	(Brazil) Italo	(Brazil) Severino Augusto	(Ghana) Agbozo Nathaniel	
Ponta Leste	(Ghana) Daniel Donkor				
Sport Laulara e Benfica					

Notes

1. FORMER PLAYER: Foreign players who were out of LFA Primera squad/left club within the season, after pre-season transfer window, or in the mid-season transfer window.
2. BOLD: Foreign players who registered in mid-season transfer window.

== League table ==
Pos	Team	Pld	W	D	L	GF	GA	GD	Pts	Qualification or relegation
1	Lalenok United (C)	14	9	3	2	35	15	+20	30	Qualification for AFC Cup play-off round
2	Boavista	14	7	4	3	28	22	+6	25	
3	Ponta Leste	14	7	2	5	22	18	+4	23	
4	Karketu Dili	14	6	2	6	24	27	−3	20	
5	Benfica Laulara	14	5	4	5	30	27	+3	19	
6	Assalam	14	5	4	5	26	29	−3	19	
7	Académica (R)	14	2	4	8	21	27	−6	10	Relegation to LFA Segunda
8	Atlético Ultramar (R)	14	3	1	10	20	41	−21	10	Relegation to LFA Segunda

Source: LFA
Rules for classification: 1) Points; 2) Goal difference; 3) Goals scored.
(C) Champions; (R) Relegated

== Result table ==
Home \ Away	ACA	ASL	ATU	BTL	KAR	LNU	POL	SLB
Academica		0–1	5–1	0–2	1–0	2–5	1–2	1–1
Assalam	2–1		5–1	1–1	2–2	0–4	1–3	1–3
Atlético Ultramar	1–1	2–3		0–1	3–2	1–4	1–4	1–5
Boavista	2–2	3–3	2–3		2–3	2–1	2–1	3–1
Karketu Dili	3–2	3–1	0–3	2–1		1–2	1–2	2–2
Lalenok United	3–2	1–1	4–1	2–3	3–0		2–0	4–2
Ponta Leste	2–2	2–1	2–1	0–1	3–1	0–0		3–2
Benfica	2–1	3–4	3–1	3–3	2–3	0–0	1–0	

Source: Liga Futebol Amadora
Legend: Blue = home team win; Yellow = draw; Red = away team win.

== Season statistics ==
=== Top scorers ===
As of matches played on 29 September 2019.

Rank	Player	Club	Goals
1	(Ghana) Daneil Adadi	Assalam	12
2	(Brazil) Rafael Marti	Boavista	10
3	(Brazil) Fabio Cristian	Lalenok United	8
4	(Timor-Leste) Edit Savio	Boavista	7
4	(Timor-Leste) Rufino Gama	Karketu Dili	7
4	(Timor-Leste) Mauzinho Bareto	SLB Baulara	7
4	(Timor-Leste) Yohanes Kapitan	Lalenok United	7
6	(Timor-Leste) Italo Pimental	Lalenok United	6

=== Hat-tricks ===
Player	For	Against	Result	Date
(Timor-Leste) Rufino Gama	AS Academica	Karketu Dili	2–3 (A)	4 August 2019
(Ghana) Daneil Adadi	Assalam	Atletico Ultramar	5–1 (H)	24 August 2019

Notes:
(H) – Home; (A) – Away
^{4} – player scorer 4 goals
^{6} – player scorer 6 goals
^{7} – player scorer 7 goals

== See also ==
- 2019 LFA Segunda
- 2019 Taça 12 de Novembro
