= Pincho (footballer) =

Timorese footballer (born 1997)

Personal information
- Full name: José da Costa Guilherme
- Date of birth: 25 December 1950 (age 75)
- Place of birth: Dili, East Timor
- Position: Midfielder

Senior career*
Years	Team	Apps	(Gls)
–1973	Sporting Clube de Timor		
1973–1977	CF Os Belenenses	57	(9)
1977―1978	FC Paços de Ferreira		
1978–1979	RD Águeda		
1979–1981	SC Covilhã	16	(6)
1981–1982	Sport Benfica e Castelo Branco		
1982–1983	União Futebol Comércio e Indústria		
- * Club domestic league appearances and goals

José da Costa Guilherme (born 25 December 1950) is a Timorese former footballer who played as a midfielder.

== Life and career ==
Pincho was born on 25 December 1950 in Dili, East Timor. He mainly operated as a midfielder. He was known for his vision. He was also known for his speed. He started his career with Timorese side Sporting Clube de Timor. He was the top scorer of the 1973 Taça Preparação with six goals. In 1973, he signed for Portuguese side CF Os Belenenses. He became the first Timorese player to play in the Portuguese top flight. He helped the club achieve third place in the league. He played for them in the UEFA Cup. He made fifty-three league appearances and scored seven goals while playing for them.

In 1977, he signed for Portuguese side FC Paços de Ferreira. In 1978, he signed for Portuguese side RD Águeda. In 1979, he signed for Portuguese side SC Covilhã. In 1981, he signed for Portuguese side Sport Benfica e Castelo Branco. In 1982, he signed for Portuguese side União Futebol Comércio e Indústria. After retiring from professional football, he moved to Australia with his family.
