= FC Lero =

- Full name: Futebol Clube Lero
- Nickname: FC Lero (Iliomar)
- Ground: Iliomar
- League: LFA Segunda
- 2019: 6th in Group B (Downgraded to LFA Terceira)
| Home colours | Away colours |

FC Lero is a Timorese football club based in Iliomar, Lautém District. The team played in LFA Segunda 2019.

== History ==
In 2019, the team played in LFA Segunda. The team finished the competition in sixth place in group B with only 1 win, 1 draw, and 3 defeats, and was relegated to LFA Terceira. Confusingly, this division has a team of a similar name, AS Lero (Lautém).

Due to the 2019-2021 COVID-19 pandemic, the Liga Futeból Timor-Leste (LFTL) canceled the three divisions of the LFA.

=== Taça 12 de Novembro ===
In 2019, FC Lero played in the Taça 12 de Novembro but was eliminated from the competition in the first phase after being defeated by the FC Lica-Lica Lemorai with a final score of 2 to 1.
