= 2020 Copa FFTL =

Copa FFTL
- Season: 2020
- Dates: 20 August –25 October
- Champions: Lalenok United
- Best Player: Juliao Mendonca (Lalenok)
- Top goalscorer: Mouzinho Barreto de Lima ( SLB Laulara) (14 goals)
- Best goalkeeper: Andrew Mensah (Assalam FC)
- Highest scoring: 9 goals SLB Laulara 9–0 Lica-Lica Lemorai; SLB Laulara 6–3 Sporting Timor; Boavista FC 8–1 Assalam FC

The 2020 Copa FFTL was an association football competition in men's domestic Timor football. The tournament was organised by the East Timor Football Federation and was held during 2020 in response to the Liga Futebol Amadora league system being cancelled due to COVID-19. The tournament was contested by the 20 clubs from the Primeira Divisão and Segunda Divisão. The competition featured a multistage format, with the participating teams initially being divided into four groups of five teams, each team playing each other once. After the group stage the four group winners and the four group runners-up progressed to the quarterfinals of a knockout finals series to determine the winner. The tournament was won by Lalenok United, defeating AD Sport Laulara e Benfica in the final 2-1.

== Group stage ==
The draw for the group stage was conducted on the 14th of August 2020.

=== Group A ===
Pos	Team	Pld	W	D	L	GF	GA	GD	Pts	Qualification or relegation
1	Lalenok United FC	4	4	0	0	13	1	+12	12	Qualified for Quarter Finals
2	Assalam FC	4	3	0	1	10	5	+5	9	Qualified for Quarter Finals
3	DIT FC	4	2	0	2	7	5	+2	6	
4	FC Zebra	4	1	0	3	7	15	−8	3	
5	Santa Cruz FC	4	0	0	4	2	13	−11	0	

=== Group B ===
Pos	Team	Pld	W	D	L	GF	GA	GD	Pts	Qualification or relegation
1	AS Ponta Leste	4	4	0	0	17	2	+15	12	Qualified for Quarter Finals
2	AS Marca FC	4	2	0	2	5	11	−6	6	Qualified for Quarter Finals
3	FC Nagarjo	4	1	1	2	6	6	0	4	
4	Atlético Ultramar	4	1	1	2	5	9	−4	4	
5	Fitun Estudante	4	1	0	3	5	10	−5	3	

=== Group C ===
Pos	Team	Pld	W	D	L	GF	GA	GD	Pts	Qualification or relegation
1	Karketu Dili	4	3	0	1	7	2	+5	9	Qualified for Quarter Finals
2	Sporting Timor	4	3	0	1	9	4	+5	9	Qualified for Quarter Finals
3	FC Porto Taibesse	4	2	1	1	8	5	+3	7	
4	FC Aitana	4	1	0	3	6	13	−7	3	
5	AS Académica	4	0	1	3	5	11	−6	1	

=== Group D ===
Pos	Team	Pld	W	D	L	GF	GA	GD	Pts	Qualification or relegation
1	Sport Laulara e Benfica	4	4	0	0	22	2	+20	12	Qualified for Quarter Finals
2	Boavista FC	4	2	1	1	8	5	+3	7	Qualified for Quarter Finals
3	Emmanuel FC	4	1	1	2	4	9	−5	4	
4	Kablaki FC	4	1	0	3	3	11	−8	3	
5	Lica-Lica Lemorai	4	0	2	2	5	15	−10	2	

== Knockout stage ==
Quarterfinals

[Oct 15] Lalenok United 6-0 AS Marca

[Oct 16] Benfica Laulara 6-3 Sporting Timor

[Oct 17] Karketu Dili FC 0-1 Boavista Timor

[Oct 18] AS Ponta Leste 0-1 Assalam FC

Semifinals

[Oct 20] Lalenok United 3-2 Boavista Timor

[Oct 21] Benfica Laulara 2-0 Assalam FC

3rd Place Play off

[Oct 24] Boavista Timor 8-1 Assalam FC

=== Final ===
2020 Copa FFTL Final Lalenok VS Benfica Laulara
- Event: 2020 Copa FFTL
Lalenok United	SLB Laulara
2	1
- Date: 25 October 2020
- Venue: East Timor National Stadium, Dili
- Attendance: -
- Weather: -

The 2020 Copa FFTL Final was played on 25 October 2020, at East Timor national Stadium in Dili.

== Aftermath ==
Following the tournament the East Timor Football Federation used the matches to select a number of players from various teams to participate in an invitational training squad run by the Timor-Leste national football team coaching staff and Fábio Magrão.
