= Cipriano Branco =

East Timorese footballer

Personal information
- Full name: Cipriano Castelo Branco
- Date of birth: 25 December 1980 (age 45)
- Place of birth: Baucau, Timor-Leste
- Height: 1.64 m (5 ft 4 1/2 in)
- Position: Midfielder

Team information
- Current team: Karketu Dili
- Number: 19

Senior career*
Years	Team	Apps	(Gls)
2007–2009	FC B. River		
2010	AD Bobonaro		
2011	Sao Bernardo		
2014	Porto Taibesse		
2015–2016	Dili Benfica		
2017–	Karketu Dili		

International career
2010–2012	Timor-Leste	3	(0)
- * Club domestic league appearances and goals as of 18 Mei 2016

Cipriano Castelo Branco (born December 25, 1980) is an East Timorese football player who currently play for Karketu Dili in Liga Futebol Amadora. He is the current midfielder for the Timor-Leste national football team. His international debut against the Philippine team on October 20, 2010 in 2010 AFF Suzuki Cup qualification as a substitute in the 52nd minute.
