= 2025 Liga Futebol Timor-Leste =

Sporting Competition

The 2025 Liga Futebol Timor-Leste is the third season under the title of the Liga Futebol Timor-Leste, and the tenth season overall. The winner of the highest division is set to gain a qualification for the AFC Challenge League.

Each competing team in the highest division is set to receive $30,000 as payment for entering the competition, while second division clubs are set to receive $5,000. Prize money for the competition consists of a $25,000 for the highest division champion and $5,000 for the runner-up, while the second division champion will receive $15,000.

== Primeira Divisaun ==
Liga Futebol Timor-Leste Primeira Divisaun
- Season: 2025
- Dates: 24 May – 24 August 2025
- Champions: Karketu Dili; 4th title
- Relegated: Académica; Ponta Leste
- AFC Challenge League: Karketu Dili
- Matches: 45
- Goals: 98 (2.18 per match)
- Top goalscorer: Jose Santos (7 goals)
- Biggest home win: Karketu Dili 7–0 Académica (5 July 2025)
- Biggest away win: AS Marca 0–4 Karketu Dili (14 June 2025)
- Highest scoring: Karketu Dili 7–0 Académica (5 July 2025)
- Longest winning run: 5 games Karketu Dili
- Longest unbeaten run: 8 games Karketu Dili
- Longest winless run: 4 games Coração
- Longest losing run: 4 games Académica

Ten teams compete in the league – eighteen returning teams from the previous season and two teams promoted from the Segunda Divisaun.

Karketu Dili were the defending champions, having won the competition in 2023. The competition did not run during 2024, with the competition being replaced by the Copa FFTL.

=== Team changes ===
To Primeira Divisaun

Promoted from Segunda Divisaun

- DIT
- AS Marca

From Primeira Divisaun

Relegated to Segunda Divisaun

- Aitana
- Lalenok United (Withdrew)

=== Teams by municipalities ===
Rank	Municipalities	Number	Teams
1	(Dili District) Dili	8	Académica, Assalam, AS Marca, DIT, Emmanuel, Karketu Dili, Ponta Leste and Porto Taibessi
2	(Aileu District) Aileu	1	Benfica Laulara
2	(Manatuto District) Manatuto	1	Coração

=== Locations ===
Locations of teams in the 2025 Liga Futebol Timor-Leste Primeira Divisaun

=== Venue ===
Stadium	Location	Capacity
National Stadium	Dili	5,000
Gleno Municipal Stadium	(Ermera District) Gleno	5,000
Manatuto Stadium	(Manatuto District) Manatuto	5,000

=== League table ===
Pos	Team	Pld	W	D	L	GF	GA	GD	Pts	Qualification or relegation
1	Karketu Dili (C)	9	6	2	1	18	2	+16	20	Qualification for the AFC Challenge League play-offs
2	Emmanuel	9	4	5	0	13	8	+5	17	
3	Porto Taibessi	9	3	3	3	9	11	−2	12	
4	Assalam	9	3	2	4	7	12	−5	11	
5	DIT	9	1	7	1	12	11	+1	10	
6	Coração (Note: Formerly known as Atlético Ultramar.)	9	2	4	3	9	10	−1	10	
7	AS Marca	9	2	4	3	6	8	−2	10	
8	Benfica Laulara	9	2	3	4	10	10	0	9 (Note: Ranked on head-to-head points: Benfica Laulara 6, Académica 3, Ponta Leste 0.)	
9	Académica	9	2	3	4	7	15	−8	9	Relegation to the LFTL Segunda Divisaun
10	Ponta Leste	9	2	3	4	7	11	−4	9	Relegation to the LFTL Segunda Divisaun

Source: Liga Futebol Timor-Leste 2025
Rules for classification: 1) Points; 2) Head-to-head points; 3) Head-to-head goal difference; 4) Head-to-head goals scored; 5) Goal difference; 6) Goals scored; 7) Fair-play points; 8) Draw.
(C) Champions

==== Position by round ====
Team ╲ Round	1	2	3	4	5	6	7	8	9
Karketu Dili	1	1	1	1	1	1	1	1	1
Emmanuel	3	2	2	2	3	3	2	2	2
Porto Taibessi	5	7	8	10	6	4	4	4	3
Assalam	4	4	5	5	2	2	3	3	4
DIT	2	5	7	9	9	6	7	6	5
Coração	8	6	6	6	10	10	10	9	6
AS Marca	7	9	4	4	5	5	5	5	7
Benfica Laulara	10	10	9	7	4	7	6	7	8
Académica	6	3	3	3	8	9	9	8	9
Ponta Leste	9	8	10	8	7	8	8	10	10

Source: Liga Futebol Timor-Leste 2025
= Leader and qualification for the 2026–27 AFC Challenge League play-offs; = Relegation to the LFTL Segunda Divisaun

=== Results ===
Home \ Away	ACA	SAL	ASM	SLB	COR	DIT	MAN	KKD	PON	FPT
Académica					2–2				2–0	
Assalam	1–0			1–0	1–0			0–1		
AS Marca	0–0	3–0		1–0	0–0		1–2	0–4	0–0	1–2
Benfica Laulara	2–0				1–2		1–1		3–1	2–2
Coração						1–1				
DIT	2–2	3–1	0–0	1–1			3–3	0–0	1–2	1–1
Emmanuel	1–0	1–1			3–2			0–0	0–0	2–0
Karketu Dili	7–0			1–0	1–2				2–0	
Ponta Leste		3–1			0–0					
Porto Taibessi	0–1	1–1			1–0			0–2		

Source: Liga Futebol Timor-Leste 2025
Legend: Blue = home team win; Yellow = draw; Red = away team win.
For upcoming matches, an "a" indicates there is an article about the rivalry between the two participants.

==== Results by round ====
Team ╲ Round	1	2	3	4	5	6	7	8	9
Académica	D	W	D	L	L	L	L	W	D
Assalam	D	W	L	D	W	W	L	L	L
AS Marca	D	L	W	D	L	W	D	D	L
Benfica Laulara	L	L	D	W	D	L	W	L	D
Coração	D	D	D	D	L	L	L	W	W
DIT	D	D	D	L	D	D	D	W	D
Emmanuel	D	W	D	D	D	W	W	D	W
Karketu Dili	W	W	W	W	W	D	W	D	L
Ponta Leste	D	L	L	W	D	L	L	D	W
Porto Taibessi	D	L	D	L	W	W	W	L	D

Source: Liga Futebol Timor-Leste 2025

=== Attendances ===
The average league attendance was 542:

#	Club	Average
1	Karketu Dili	1,247
2	Emmanuel	876
3	Laulara	698
4	Porto Taibessi	518
5	Assalam	462
6	Coração	403
7	Marca	389
8	DIT	312
9	Académica	259
10	Ponta Leste	254

== Segunda Divisaun ==
Liga Futebol Timor-Leste Segunda Divisaun
- Season: 2025
- Dates: 24 June – 31 August 2025
- Champions: Aitana; 1st title
- Promoted: Aitana; Santa Cruz
- Relegated: Kablaki; Zebra
- Matches: 21
- Goals: 62 (2.95 per match)
- Top goalscorer: Mario Pañao (5 goals)
- Biggest home win: Nagarjo 3–0 Zebra (24 June 2025)
- Biggest away win: Lica-Lica Lemorai 0–4 FIEL (17 July 2025)
- Highest scoring: Kablaki 3–4 Lica-Lica Lemorai (25 June 2025); FIEL 3–4 Kablaki (30 August 2025)
- Longest winning run: 4 games Aitana
- Longest unbeaten run: 5 games Aitana
- Longest winless run: 5 games Kablaki
- Longest losing run: 5 games Kablaki

Seven teams compete in the league – six returning teams from the previous season and Aitana who relegated from the Primeira Divisaun. Lalenok United withdrawn from the competition this season.

=== Team changes ===
To Segunda Divisaun

Relegated from Primeira Divisaun

- Aitana
- Lalenok United (Withdrew)

From Segunda Divisaun

Promoted to Primeira Divisaun

- DIT
- AS Marca

=== Teams by municipalities ===
Rank	Municipalities	Number	Teams
1	(Dili District) Dili	4	Aitana, FIEL, Nagarjo, Santa Cruz
2	(Baucau District) Baucau	1	Zebra
2	(Manufahi District) Manufahi	1	Kablaki
2	(Viqueque District) Viqueque	1	Lica-Lica Lemorai

=== Locations ===
Locations of teams in the 2025 Liga Futebol Timor-Leste Segunda Divisaun

=== Venue ===
Stadium	Location	Capacity
National Stadium	Dili	5,000
Gleno Municipal Stadium	(Ermera District) Gleno	5,000

=== Table ===
Pos	Team	Pld	W	D	L	GF	GA	GD	Pts	Promotion or relegation
1	Aitana (C, P)	6	4	1	1	9	5	+4	13	Promotion to the LFTL Primeira Divisaun
2	Santa Cruz (P)	6	3	3	0	6	3	+3	12 (Note: Ranked on head-to-head points: Santa Cruz 3, Nagarjo 0.)	Promotion to the LFTL Primeira Divisaun
3	Nagarjo	6	4	0	2	12	6	+6	12	
4	FIEL	6	2	2	2	13	10	+3	8	
5	Lica-Lica Lemorai	6	2	0	4	7	13	−6	6	
6	Zebra (R)	6	1	2	3	8	12	−4	5	Relegation to the LFTL Terseira Divisaun
7	Kablaki (R)	6	1	0	5	10	16	−6	3	Relegation to the LFTL Terseira Divisaun

Source: Liga Futebol Timor-Leste 2025
Rules for classification: 1) Points; 2) Head-to-head points; 3) Head-to-head goal difference; 4) Head-to-head goals scored; 5) Goal difference; 6) Goals scored; 7) Fair-play points; 8) Draw.
(C) Champions; (P) Promoted; (R) Relegated

==== Position by round ====
Team ╲ Round	1	2	3	4	5	6	7
Aitana	5	3	2	1	1	‡	1
Santa Cruz	‡	3	4	4	3	2	2
Nagarjo	1	‡	2	1	3	4	3
FIEL	3	1	‡	3	2	3	4
Lica-Lica Lemorai	2	4	6	6	6	‡	5
Zebra	5	5	5	5	5	6	‡
Kablaki	4	7	7	‡	7	7	7

Source: Liga Futebol Timor-Leste 2025
= Promotion to the LFTL Primeira Divisaun; = Relegation to the LFTL Terseira Divisaun

=== Results ===
Home \ Away	AIT	FEL	KAB	LEM	NAG	SCZ	ZEB
Aitana			2–1	2–0		0–0	
FIEL	2–1		3–4				1–1
Kablaki				3–4	1–3		1–3
Lica-Lica Lemorai		0–4			0–2	0–1	
Nagarjo	0–1	3–2					3–0
Santa Cruz		1–1	1–0		2–1		
Zebra	2–3			1–3		1–1	

Source: Liga Futebol Timor-Leste 2025
Legend: Blue = home team win; Yellow = draw; Red = away team win.
For upcoming matches, an "a" indicates there is an article about the rivalry between the two participants.

==== Results by round ====
Team ╲ Round	1	2	3	4	5	6	7
Aitana	L	W	W	W	W	‡	D
FIEL	W	D	‡	W	D	L	W
Kablaki	L	L	L	‡	L	L	W
Lica-Lica Lemorai	W	L	L	L	‡	W	L
Nagarjo	W	‡	W	L	L	W	W
Santa Cruz	‡	D	W	D	W	W	D
Zebra	L	W	L	D	D	L	‡

Source: Liga Futebol Timor-Leste 2025

Notes:
^{‡} Teams that did not play in the aforementioned matchweek.

== Segunda Divisão Qualifiers ==
Following the completion of the Segunda Divisão, in December 2025 the 2025–26 Liga Futebol Timor-Leste Segunda Divisão Qualifiers commenced. This competition, competed in by 39 teams from around the different districts of Timor-Leste, forms the promotion pathway for clubs into the 2026 Segunda Divisão season.
