= 2019 LFA Segunda =

Tournament details
- Country: Timor Leste
- Dates: 13 November – 12 December 2019
- Teams: 12

Final positions
- Champions: DIT FC
- Runners-up: Aitana FC

Tournament statistics
- Matches played: 31
- Goals scored: 122 (3.94 per match)
- All statistics correct as of 10-04-21.

2019 Liga Futebol Amadora Segunda Divisão (often referred to as the LFA Segunda Divisão) is second-highest division of the Liga Futebol Amadora and second-highest overall in the Timorense football league system.

The competition started on April 30 with the match between Aitana FC and Porto Taibesse and ended on July 19 with a final match between Aitana FC and DIT FC. The DIT FC team was the champion, as they beat the Aitana FC team with a score of 3 a 1. The two finalist teams were promoted to the Liga Futebol Amadora Primeira Divisão.

The two teams that had the fewest points Cacusan CF (Group A) and AS Lero (Group B) were relegated to Liga Futebol Amadora Terceira Divisão.

== Group stage ==
=== Grupo A ===
1.Aitana  FC                           5   4  1  0  16- 2  13       Promoted

2.Kablaki FC (Manufahi)                5   3  1  1  13-10  10
3.FC Porto Taibesse                    5   3  1  1   9- 8  10
4.FC FIEL                              5   1  2  2   5- 5   5
5.FC Zebra (Baucau)                    5   1  0  4   6-15   3

6.Cacusan CF                           5   0  1  4   6-15   1  [R]  Relegated

=== Grupo B ===
1.DIT FC                               5   3  2  0  18- 5  11  [R]  Promoted

2.FC Nagarjo                           5   3  1  1  18-10  10
3.FC Lica-Lica Lemorai                 5   2  0  3  10-16   6
4.Santa Cruz FC (East Timor)           5   2  0  3   3-14   6
5.Sporting Clube de Timor              5   1  2  2   8- 6   5

6.AS Lero (Iliomar)                    5   1  1  3   9-15   4       Relegated

== Matches ==
=== Round 1 ===
[Apr 30]
Aitana FC 3-1 FC Porto Taibesse
[May 1]
Lica-Lica Lemorai 2-4 AS Lero
[May 2]
FC FIEL 1-1 Cacusan CF
[May 3]
Santa Cruz FC 0-4 DIT FC
[May 9]
FC Nagarjo 1-1 Sporting Timor
[May 10]
FC Zebra 2-5 Kablaki FC

=== Round 2 ===
[May 16]
FC FIEL 2-0 FC Zebra
[May 17]
DIT FC 5-1 FC Nagarjo
[May 30]
FC Porto Taibesse 2-2 Kablaki FC
[May 31]
Lica-Lica Lemorai 3-0 Santa Cruz FC
[Jun 1]
Cacusan CF 1-5 Aitana FC
[Jun 2]
Sporting Timor 4-0 AS Lero

=== Round 3 ===
[Jun 4]
FC FIEL 1-2 Kablaki FC
[Jun 5]
Aitana FC 5-0 FC Zebra
[Jun 6]
Cacusan CF 1-2 FC Porto Taibesse
[Jun 7]
FC Nagarjo 7-0 Santa Cruz FC
[Jun 8]
Sporting Timor 2-3 Lica-Lica Lemorai
[Jun 9]
AS Lero 3-3 DIT FC

=== Round 4 ===
[Jun 10]
Kablaki FC 4-2 Cacusan CF
[Jun 11]
FC Porto Taibesse 2-1 FC Zebra
[Jun 12]
Lica-Lica Lemorai 0-5 DIT FC
[Jun 13]
AS Lero 2-4 FC Nagarjo
[Jun 14]
Aitana FC 0-0 FC FIEL
[Jun 18]
Santa Cruz FC 1-0 Sporting Timor

=== Round 5 ===
[Jun 19]
Kablaki FC 0-3 Aitana FC
[Jun 21]
Lica-Lica Lemorai 2-5 FC Nagarjo
[Jun 24]
FC Porto Taibesse 2-1 FC FIEL
[Jun 25]
Santa Cruz FC 2-0 AS Lero
[Jun 26]
FC Zebra 3-1 Cacusan CF
[Jun 27]
DIT FC 1-1 Sporting Timor

== Classification ==
=== Grupo A ===
1.Aitana  FC                           5   4  1  0  16- 2  13       Promoted

2.Kablaki FC (Manufahi)                5   3  1  1  13-10  10
3.FC Porto Taibesse                    5   3  1  1   9- 8  10
4.FC FIEL                              5   1  2  2   5- 5   5
5.FC Zebra (Baucau)                    5   1  0  4   6-15   3

6.Cacusan CF                           5   0  1  4   6-15   1  [R]  Relegated

=== Grupo B ===
1.DIT FC                               5   3  2  0  18- 5  11  [R]  Promoted

2.FC Nagarjo                           5   3  1  1  18-10  10
3.FC Lica-Lica Lemorai                 5   2  0  3  10-16   6
4.Santa Cruz FC (East Timor)           5   2  0  3   3-14   6
5.Sporting Clube de Timor              5   1  2  2   8- 6   5

6.AS Lero (Iliomar)                    5   1  1  3   9-15   4       Relegated

== Final ==
19 July 2019 Final	(Dili District) Aitana FC	1–3	DIT FC (Dili District)	(Dili District) Díli, (Timor-Leste) East Timor
		Report		Stadium: Estadio Municipal, Dili; Attendance: 5,000
