= Kim Shin-hwan =

South Korean football manager

Kim Shin-hwan (Korean: 김신환) is a South Korean football manager and former player.

== Career ==
Kim is nicknamed the "Hiddink of East Timor" after Dutch manager Guus Hiddink and was regarded as an important figure in Timorese football development.
