= Assalam S.C. =

Assalam
- Full name: Assalam Sport Club
- Nickname: Tropas Verdes (The Green Troops)
- Founded: 2008; 18 years ago
- Ground: Estadio Municipal de Dili
- Capacity: 5,000
- President: Ipolito Soares
- League: Liga Futebol Timor-Leste
Home colours	Away colours	Third colours

Assalam Sport Club, commonly known as Assalam SC is an East Timorese professional football club based in Dili. The team plays in the Liga Futebol Timor-Leste in the Primeira Divisão.

They were the champions of the Segunda Divisão in 2018, earning promotion to Primeira Divisão for the first time. They are also the 2 time runners up of the Taça 12 de Novembro, losing in the final to Ponta Leste in 2016 and Atlético Ultramar in 2018.

== History ==
Players that goes on to play for Timor Leste national team at the ASEAN Championship:

=== 2024 ASEAN Championship ===
- Junildo
- Francisco da Costa
- João Panji
- Sandro Quintão

== Players ==
Current squad as of January 2026 for the Taça da Liga Timor-Leste 2026
Note: Flags indicate national team as defined under FIFA eligibility rules; some limited exceptions apply. Players may hold more than one non-FIFA nationality.

No.	Pos.	Nation	Player
29	GK	TLS	Baptisa Josman K. Ola
5		IDN	Resky Kurniawan
14		TLS	Emildio C. Casimiro
19		TLS	Ivan Antonio F.M. Lay
2		TLS	Jacob Salsinha Maia
20		TLS	Anito de Melo C. Fernandes
23		TLS	Martinho Filipe Lopes (Captain)
7		TLS	Lazaro Ximenes
11		TLS	Augostu da Costa
16		TLS	Norberto da D. da Costa
24		TLS	Natalicio M. Soares
12		TLS	Edilson Marques
17		TLS	Bonarudin Amin
22		TLS	Turibio A.P. Brites

No.	Pos.	Nation	Player
8		TLS	Marzelito Fernandes
4		TLS	Noezio Soares dos Santos
13		TLS	Domingos da Silva
3		TLS	Liborio Ximenes
18		TLS	Simiao da Silva Verdial
27		TLS	Alexandrino B. Miranda
30		TLS	Levidinho F. Casimiro
21		TLS	Gerifrico A.M. Menezes

== Competitive records ==
Competitive records from RSSSF

Season	Competition	Pld	W	D	L	GF	GA	GD	Pts	Position	National Cup: Taça 12 de Novembro
2016	Segunda Divisão	6	3	2	1	16	10	+6	11	2nd in Group B	Runner-Up
2017	Segunda Divisão	12	9	1	2	33	11	+22	28	2nd in Group B	First Round
2018	Segunda Divisão	11	8	2	1	37	10	+27	26	1st (Promoted)	Runner-Up
2019	Primeira Divisão	14	5	4	5	26	29	−3	19	6th	Semi-Finals
2020	Copa FFTL	4	3	0	1	10	5	+5	9	2nd Group A 4th Place in knockouts	Preliminary Round
2021	Primeira Divisão	6	1	3	2	11	12	-1	6	5th	
2023	Primeira Divisão	8	3	2	3	11	11	0	11	6th	
2025	Primeira Divisão	9	3	2	4	7	12	-5	11	4th	

== Honours ==
=== Segunda Divisão ===
- 2018: Champions

=== Taça 12 de Novembro ===
- 2016: Runner-up
- 2018: Runner-up
