= Fitun Estudante Lorosae =

FC FIEL
- Full name: Futebol Clube Fitun Estudante Lorosae
- Founded: 2001; 25 years ago
- Ground: Municipal Stadium, Dili
- Capacity: 5,000
- Manager: Arsenio Afonsu
- League: LFA2
- 2023: 5th
Home colours	Away colours

Fitun Estudante Lorosae (in Tetun mean Star students of the east), commonly known as FIEL is an East Timorese football club based in Dili. The team plays in the Liga Futebol Amadora.

== History ==
In early 2017, the creation of a third league was considered in East Timor. One of the team that talked about it was FC FIEL.

On 20 April 2017 by the League Futebol Amadora twelve teams were determined who could qualify in a tournament for the second division. One of them was FC FIEL.

The tournament took place from 16 to 31 May 2017. The FC FIEL managed there position on 2018 LFA Segunda with a 2–0 victory against União Tokodede in the match for third place qualification.

== Squad List ==
Squad as of January 2026 for the Taça da Liga Timor-Leste 2026

Note: Flags indicate national team as defined under FIFA eligibility rules; some limited exceptions apply. Players may hold more than one non-FIFA nationality.

No.	Pos.	Nation	Player
1	GK	TLS	Aldo Joaoa Manise
4		TLS	Delio Joao Manise
2		TLS	Jenito Aniceito
5		TLS	Pedro Fernandes
16		TLS	Geovanio Vicente
7		TLS	Bernardino Vaz
19		TLS	Natalizo I. Sang
8		TLS	Remigio Da C. Soares
9		TLS	Isaias Magalhaes
11		TLS	Expedito Fuel
17		TLS	Joao Amandio

No.	Pos.	Nation	Player
20		TLS	Dilson Alves
13		TLS	Deonizio Da Cunha
14		TLS	Favio Ximenes
22		TLS	Gabriel Da Conceicao
12		TLS	Hernanio A. Tiles
6		TLS	Elidio Fa Costa Manuelo
15		TLS	Lorenco Ximenes
10		TLS	Pedro Borges Sanches
3		TLS	Geovaldo Ximenes
18		TLS	Tarsicio Lopes
21		TLS	Mario Quefi
23		TLS	Jeca Pereira

== Competitive Record ==
Competitive records from RSSSF. Exact results prior to 2016 are unknown.

Season	Competition	Pld	W	D	L	GF	GA	GD	Pts	Position	National Cup: Taça 12 de Novembro
2017	Segunda Divisão promotion playoff	3rd place (Promoted)									-
2018	Segunda Divisão	11	3	3	5	9	14	-5	12	8th	First Round
2019	Segunda Divisão	5	1	2	2	5	5	0	5	4th in Group A	Preliminary Round
2020	Copa FFTL	4	1	0	3	5	10	-5	3	5th in Group B	First Round
2021	Segunda Divisão	4	0	1	3	3	8	-5	1	5th in Group A	-
2023	Segunda Divisão	7	2	1	4	7	12	-5	8	5th	-
2024	Copa FFTL	3	1	2	0	3	2	1	5	2nd in Group C (Qualified) Quarter Finalist	-
2025	Segunda Divisão	6	2	2	2	13	10	3	8	4th	-

== Honours ==
- Copa Presidente champions : 2004
