= FC Nagardjo =

- Full name: Futebol Clube Nagardjo
- Ground: Kampo Demokrasia, Dili
- Capacity: 1,000
- Manager: Juliao Monteiro
- League: LFTL
- 2025: 3rd
Home colours	Away colours

Futebol Clube Nagardjo, commonly known as Nagardjo is an East Timorese football club based in Dili. The team plays in the Liga Futebol Amadora.

== Competitive Record ==
Competitive records from RSSSF. Exact results prior to 2016 are unknown.

Season	Competition	Pld	W	D	L	GF	GA	GD	Pts	Position	National Cup: Taça 12 de Novembro
2016	Segunda Divisão	6	0	2	4	6	15	-9	2	7th in Group B	First Round
2017	Segunda Divisão	10	6	4	0	27	8	+19	22	2nd in Group A	Quarter Finals
2018	Segunda Divisão	11	5	2	4	18	19	-1	17	5th	First Round
2019	Segunda Divisão	5	3	1	1	18	10	8	10	2nd in Group B	Preliminary Round
2020	Copa FFTL	4	1	1	2	6	6	0	4	3rd in Group B	Preliminary Round
2021	Segunda Divisão	5	2	1	2	13	8	+5	7	3rd in Group B	-
2023	Segunda Divisão	7	1	3	3	9	12	-3	6	7th	-
2025	Segunda Divisão	6	4	0	2	12	6	+6	12	3rd	-
