= Kablaki F.C. =

East Timorese football club

Kablaky FC
- Full name: Kablaki Futebol Clube
- Ground: Same Stadium, Same District
- Capacity: 5,000
- Manager: João Paulo
- League: LFTL
- 2025: 7th
Home colours	Away colours

Kablaky Futebol Clube, commonly known as Kablaky is an East Timorese football club based in Manufahi, Same District. The team plays in the Liga Futebol Timor-Leste, playing in the Segunda Divisão since its inception in 2016. The club also includes a partnered futsal team that is set to compete in the Pra Liga Futsal Timor-Leste.

== Squad (2020/2021) ==
Updated September 2020.

Head Coach: João Fernandes
2020 Copa FFTL starting line-up

1. Mariano Matins (GK)
4. Domingos Pires
19. Cerilo Santos
2. Martinho Costa
3. Carolino Correia
14. Fretelino Santos
17. Silvestre Castro
6. Justino Deus
11. José Costa
9. Kevin Fernandes
12. Teodoro Costa

20. Aldo Manise (GK)
7. Julinho Costa
16. Amandio Galucho
8. Matias Guterres
10. Joanico Noronha
13. Job Rego
18. Silvestre Gama
Head Coach. João Fernandes

== Competitive Record ==
Competitive records from RSSSF. Exact results prior to 2016 are unknown.

Season	Competition	Pld	W	D	L	GF	GA	GD	Pts	Position	National Cup: Taça 12 de Novembro
2016	Segunda Divisão	6	1	2	3	13	20	-7	5	5th in Group B	Second Round
2017	Segunda Divisão	10	3	2	5	14	27	-13	11	4th in Group A	-
2018	Segunda Divisão	11	1	4	6	11	18	-7	7	11th	First Round
2019	Segunda Divisão	5	3	1	1	13	10	+3	10	2nd in Group A	First Round
2020	Copa FFTL	4	1	0	3	3	11	-8	3	4th in Group D	First Round
2021	Segunda Divisão	5	0	1	4	4	17	-13	1	6th in Group B	-
2023	Segunda Divisão	7	1	0	6	7	16	-9	3	8th	-
2025	Segunda Divisão	6	1	0	5	10	16	-6	3	7th (Relegated)	-
