= Clube Lica-Lica Lemorai =

East Timorese football club

Lica-Lica Lemorai
- Full name: Futebol Clube Lica-Lica Lemorai
- Ground: Viqueque Stadium, Viqueque
- Capacity: 5,000
- Manager: Claudinho
- League: LFTL
- 2025: 5th
| Home colours | Away colours |

Futebol Clube Lica-Lica Lemorai, commonly known as Lica-Lica Lemorai, is an East Timorese football club based in Viqueque. The team plays in the Liga Futebol Timor-Leste.

== Squad List ==
Squad as of January 2026 for the Taça da Liga Timor-Leste 2026

Note: Flags indicate national team as defined under FIFA eligibility rules; some limited exceptions apply. Players may hold more than one non-FIFA nationality.

| No. | Pos. | Nation | Player |
|---|---|---|---|
| 35 | GK | TLS | Obadias Do Carmo |
| 4 | | TLS | Josefino E. Da C. Gusmao |
| 20 | | TLS | Armindo G. Amaral |
| 23 | | TLS | Tonito T. X. Belo |
| 24 | | TLS | Demelson A. Jadi |
| 15 | | TLS | Joanico E. J. Noronha |
| 18 | | TLS | Joserlito N. De Jesus |
| 11 | | TLS | Nensio C. D. J. Da S. Fernandes |
| 10 | | TLS | Mario De Jesus Panaun |
| 9 | | TLS | Rivaldo F. S. Correia |
| 8 | | TLS | Mario M. Da C. Freitas |

| No. | Pos. | Nation | Player |
|---|---|---|---|
| 30 | | TLS | Herculano A. Lopes |
| 5 | | TLS | Jacob Da Silva Gomes |
| 13 | | TLS | Jenio M. P. Soriano |
| 6 | | TLS | Tonzo Madeira |
| 14 | | TLS | Ivo D. Pinto |
| 22 | | TLS | Jimmi M. Mendonca |
| 17 | | TLS | Ricky |
| 10 | | TLS | Diego G. Soares |
| 19 | | TLS | Jonas S. Da Conceicao |
| 7 | | TLS | Kevin Jaime C. Fernandes |
| 21 | | TLS | Carlos L. Fernandes |
| — | | TLS | Jogilvanio M. Da S. Barreto |

== Competitive Record ==
Competitive records from RSSSF. Exact results prior to 2016 are unknown.

| Season | Competition | Pld | W | D | L | GF | GA | GD | Pts | Position | National Cup: Taça 12 de Novembro |
|---|---|---|---|---|---|---|---|---|---|---|---|
| 2016 | Segunda Divisão | 6 | 3 | 1 | 2 | 12 | 8 | +4 | 10 | 3rd in Group B | First Round |
| 2017 | Segunda Divisão | 12 | 6 | 3 | 3 | 29 | 15 | +14 | 21 | 3rd in Group B | - |
| 2018 | Segunda Divisão | 11 | 2 | 7 | 2 | 16 | 15 | +1 | 13 | 7th | Preliminary Round |
| 2019 | Segunda Divisão | 5 | 2 | 0 | 3 | 10 | 16 | -6 | 6 | 3rd in Group B | Quarter Finals |
| 2020 | Copa FFTL | 4 | 0 | 2 | 2 | 5 | 15 | -10 | 2 | 5th in Group D | Quarter Finals |
| 2021 | Segunda Divisão | 5 | 1 | 3 | 1 | 11 | 8 | +3 | 6 | 4th in Group B | - |
| 2023 | Segunda Divisão | 7 | 2 | 1 | 4 | 7 | 12 | -5 | 7 | 6th | - |
| 2024 | Copa FFTL | 3 | 1 | 0 | 2 | 6 | 6 | 0 | 3 | 3rd in Group D | - |
| 2024 | Copa Falintil | Knocked out in First Round | | | | | | | | | |
| 2025 | Segunda Divisão | 6 | 2 | 0 | 4 | 7 | 13 | -6 | 6 | 5th | - |
