= FC Porto Taibesse =

- Full name: Futebol Clube do Porto Taibesse
- Nicknames: Dragões; Azuis e Brancos
- Founded: 1938; 88 years ago
- Manager: Luis Simoes
- League: Liga Futebol Amadora Primeira Divisão
- 2025: 3rd
| Home colours | Away colours |

FC Porto Taibesse is a professional football club of East Timor from Dili (Vila de Lahane Oriental).

== Competitive record ==
Competitive records from RSSSF. Exact results prior to 2016 are unknown.

== Squad ==
Squad list as of January 2026 Note: Flags indicate national team as defined under FIFA eligibility rules; some limited exceptions apply. Players may hold more than one non-FIFA nationality.

| No. | Pos. | Nation | Player |
|---|---|---|---|
| 20 | | TLS | Januario Abi |
| 2 | | TLS | Claudio F.S. Soares |
| 3 | | TLS | Carol Moreira |
| 22 | | TLS | Aurito Da Costa |
| 4 | | TLS | Hilton M. Da Cruz |
| 15 | | TLS | Jerico Piedade |
| 12 | | TLS | Hassan Ramos |
| 8 | | TLS | Gabriel P. Ati |
| 10 | | TLS | Yohanes Yoko J. Hammam |
| 9 | | TLS | Jardel Piedade |
| 21 | | TLS | Gaudencio Karen De Jesus |

| No. | Pos. | Nation | Player |
|---|---|---|---|
| 21 | | TLS | Juvencio H. C. Soares |
| 14 | | TLS | David Da Conceicao |
| 23 | | TLS | Andre Correia |
| 7 | | TLS | Jossin Da C. Ku |
| 11 | | TLS | Gregorio D.R. Silva |
| 18 | | TLS | Inoncesius S. Ati |
| 19 | | TLS | Raul Issac |

| Season | Competition | Pld | W | D | L | GF | GA | GD | Pts | Position | National Cup: Taça 12 de Novembro |
|---|---|---|---|---|---|---|---|---|---|---|---|
| 2001 | Taça Vos Esperança | | | | | | | | | | |
| 2004 | League name unknown | | | | | | | | | | |
| 2005–06 | Super Liga | | | | | | | | | | |
| 2016 | Primeira Divisão | 14 | 6 | 3 | 5 | 16 | 16 | 0 | 21 | 3rd | First Round |
| 2017 | Primeira Divisão | 14 | 1 | 2 | 11 | 11 | 44 | −33 | 5 | 8th (Relegated) | First Round |
| 2018 | Segunda Divisão | 11 | 3 | 1 | 7 | 14 | 25 | −11 | 10 | 9th | Round of 16 |
| 2019 | Segunda Divisão | 5 | 3 | 1 | 1 | 9 | 8 | +1 | 10 | 3rd in Group A | Preliminary Round |
| 2020 | Copa FFTL | 4 | 2 | 1 | 1 | 8 | 5 | +3 | 7 | 3rd in Group C | |
| 2021 | Segunda Divisão | 4 | 3 | 1 | 0 | 10 | 6 | +4 | 10 | 2nd in Group A (Promoted) | |
| 2023 | Primeira Divisão | 8 | 2 | 2 | 4 | 8 | 13 | -5 | 8 | 7th | |
| 2025 | Primeira Divisão | 9 | 3 | 3 | 3 | 9 | 11 | -2 | 12 | 3rd | |

== Affiliated clubs ==
- (Portugal) FC Porto
- FC Porto de Macau
- (São Tomé and Príncipe) FC Porto Real
- (São Tomé and Príncipe) FC Celsi
