= Santa Cruz F.C. (Timor-Leste) =

Santa Cruz FC
- Full name: Santa Cruz Futebol Clube Dili
- Ground: Kampo Demokrasia, Dili
- Capacity: 1,000
- Manager: João Campos
- League: Primeira Divisao
- 2026: 2nd
| Home colours | Away colours |

Santa Cruz Futebol Clube, commonly known as Santa Cruz is an East Timorese football club based in Dili. The team plays in the Liga Futebol Timor-Leste.

== Competitive Record ==
Competitive records from RSSSF. Exact results prior to 2016 are unknown.

| Season | Competition | Pld | W | D | L | GF | GA | GD | Pts | Position | National Cup: Taça 12 de Novembro |
|---|---|---|---|---|---|---|---|---|---|---|---|
| 2016 | Segunda Divisão | 6 | 1 | 2 | 3 | 9 | 20 | -11 | 5 | 6th in Group B | First Round |
| 2017 | Segunda Divisão | 10 | 5 | 2 | 3 | 17 | 15 | 2 | 17 | 3rd in Group A | Quarter Finals |
| 2018 | Segunda Divisão | 11 | 1 | 3 | 7 | 13 | 27 | -14 | 6 | 12th | First Round |
| 2019 | Segunda Divisão | 5 | 2 | 0 | 3 | 3 | 14 | -11 | 6 | 4th in Group B | First Round |
| 2020 | Copa FFTL | 4 | 0 | 0 | 4 | 2 | 13 | -11 | 0 | 5th in Group A | First Round |
| 2021 | Segunda Divisão | 5 | 2 | 0 | 3 | 7 | 13 | -6 | 6 | 5th in Group B | - |
| 2023 | Segunda Divisão | 7 | 2 | 2 | 3 | 9 | 12 | -3 | 8 | 4th | - |
| 2025 | Segunda Divisão | 6 | 3 | 3 | 0 | 6 | 3 | 3 | 12 | 2nd (Promoted) | |
| 2026 | Primeira Divisão | 9 | 7 | 2 | 0 | 19 | 4 | 15 | 23 | 2nd | |
