= 2021 Liga Futebol Amadora =

Liga Futebol Amadora
- Season: 2021
- Dates: 12 November – 23 December
- Champions: Karketu Dili (2nd title)
- Relegated: DIT; Boavista
- AFC Cup: None (Note: Did not have a licensed club.)
- Matches: 21
- Goals: 52 (2.48 per match)
- Top goalscorer: Daniel Adade; Hasan Costa; Francyatma Kefi (5 goals each)
- Biggest home win: Benfica Laulara 4–1 DIT (23 November 2021)
- Biggest away win: DIT 1–3 Assalam (28 November 2021)
- Highest scoring: 6 goals Lalenok United 4–2 Assalam (14 November 2021); Assalam 3–3 Benfica Laulara (10 December 2021)
- Longest winning run: 2 matches Karketu Dili; Ponta Leste
- Longest unbeaten run: 6 matches Karketu Dili
- Longest winless run: 5 matches Benfica Laulara
- Longest losing run: 4 matches DIT

The 2021 Liga Futebol Amadora was the fifth season of the Liga Futebol Amadora Primeira Divisão. The season began on 12 November and finished on 23 December 2021.

Lalenok United were the defending champions.

Karketu Dili won their second Liga Futebol Amadora title and qualified for the 2022 AFC Cup in the play-off round. Though, they did not participate because they didn't have an AFC license.

Most games took place at the 5,000-capacity National Stadium.

== League table ==
Pos	Team	Pld	W	D	L	GF	GA	GD	Pts	Qualification or relegation
1	Karketu Dili (C)	6	4	2	0	6	2	+4	14	Qualification for AFC Cup play-off round
2	Lalenok United	6	3	2	1	10	6	+4	11	
3	Ponta Leste	6	2	2	2	4	4	0	8	
4	Benfica Laulara	6	1	4	1	9	8	+1	7	
5	Assalam	6	1	3	2	11	12	−1	6	
6	Aitana	6	1	2	3	6	8	−2	5	
7	DIT (R)	6	1	1	4	6	12	−6	4	Relegation to LFA Segunda
8	Boavista (R)	0	0	0	0	0	0	0	0	Withdrew

Source: RSSSF
Rules for classification: 1) Points; 2) Goal difference; 3) Goals scored.
(C) Champions; (R) Relegated

== Result table ==
Home \ Away	AIT	ASL	BFL	BOA	DIT	KKD	LNU	PTL
Aitana			0–0			0–1		2–1
Assalam	2–2		3–3			0–1		
Benfica Laulara					4–1	1–1		0–0
Boavista								
DIT	3–2	1–3					1–1	
Karketu Dili					1–0		1–1	1–0
Lalenok United	1–0	4–2	3–1					
Ponta Leste		1–1			1–0		1–0	

Source: Liga Futebol Amadora
Legend: Blue = home team win; Yellow = draw; Red = away team win.
