= AS Académica =

Académica
- Full name: Académica e Sporting de Timor
- Nickname(s): Os Estudantes (The students)
- Founded: 1967; 58 years ago
- Ground: Municipal Stadium
- Capacity: 5,000
- Manager: Fernando B. Xavier
- League: Liga Futebol Timor-Leste
- 2025: 9th, Primeira Divisiao
Home colours	Away colours

Académica or Académica e Sporting de Timor is a professional football club based in Dili, East Timor. The team plays in the Liga Futebol Timor-Leste in the Primeira Divisão, and was one of the original eight teams that participated in the first season of the Primeira Divisão in 2016. The club also includes a partnered futsal team that competes in the Pra Liga Futsal Timor-Leste and a women's team that competes in the Liga Feto Timor Primeira Divisão.

== Squad ==
As of 2020

Number	Name
1	Vicente Guterres (GK)
13	Antonio Ximenes (C)
8	Joel Gaio
17	Juvenal Boavida
12	Frazao Lopes
5	Jeremias Silva
14	Rivaldo Ribeiro
10	Jeronimo Freitas
9	Jose Boavida
4	Romolu Silva
16	Celso Escurial
30	Guivio Santos (GK)
3	Domingos Carvalho
2	Edi Gusmão
11	Helder Barreto
15	Tiago Silva
6	Lourenco Pinto
7	João Pinto

== Competitive records ==
Competitive records from RSSSF

Season	Competition	Pld	W	D	L	GF	GA	GD	Pts	Position	National Cup: Taça 12 de Novembro
1973	Taça Preparação	5	1	0	4	4	15	-11	2	5th	
1973	Campeonato Provincial	6	1	1	4	4	10	-6	3	5th	
1974	Campeonato Provincial	6	3	1	2				7	3rd	
2005–06	Super Liga									3rd	
2016	Primeira Divisão	14	5	5	4	18	17	+1	20	4th	2nd Round
2017	Primeira Divisão	14	4	6	4	14	12	+2	18	5th	
2018	Primeira Divisão	14	6	1	7	26	34	−8	19	6th	Preliminary Round
2019	Primeira Divisão	14	2	4	8	21	27	−6	10	7th (Relegated)	Quarter Finals
2020	Copa FFTL	4	0	1	3	5	11	−6	1	5th Group C	Round of 16
2021	Segunda Divisão	4	3	1	0	11	6	+5	10	1st Group A (Lost Final)(Promoted)	
2023	Primeira Divisão	8	1	2	5	9	15	-6	5	8th	
2025	Primeira Divisão	9	2	3	4	7	15	-8	9	9th (Relegated)	
