= FC Zebra =

Zebra Baucau
- Full name: Clube Futebol Zebra Baucau
- Nickname: The Dili Zebra
- Founded: 1985; 40 years ago
- Ground: Baucau Municipal Stadium
- Capacity: 5,000
- Manager: Jordan Worth
- League: Segunda Divisão
- 2025: 6th
Home colours	Away colours

Clube Futebol Zebra Baucau, also known as Zebra Baucau, is a football team based in Baucau, East Timor that plays in the Liga Futebol Timor-Leste. The team currently dispute the second division of the Liga Futebol Timor-Leste. It also participates in other competitions organized by the FFTL, such as Taça 12 de Novembro and Copa FFTL.

== Squad (2020/2021) ==
Updated September 2020.

Head Coach: Rogerio Mok'
2020 Copa FFTL starting line-up

20. Paulino Rosario (GK)
7. Agustinho Guterres
5. Camilo Boavida
13. Elvis Silva
5. Vasco Boavida
4. Rique Marçal
17. Jeronimo Soares
18. Leonel Gama
11. Gaspar Ximenes
19. Rui boavida
22. Juvencio Castro

1. Belarmino Belo (GK)
6. Calistro Pereira
8. Domingos Freitas
15. Deolindo Peloi
21. Rui Carlos
12. Helder Lopes
10. Antonio Jesus
Head Coach. Rogerio Mok

== Competitive Record ==
Competitive records from RSSSF. Exact results prior to 2016 are unknown.

Season	Competition	Pld	W	D	L	GF	GA	GD	Pts	Position	National Cup: Taça 12 de Novembro
2006	Super Liga	Results Unknown									
2016	Segunda Divisão	5	3	2	0	12	3	+9	11	1st in Group A. Lost Final. (Promoted)	First Round
2017	Primeira Divisão	14	2	6	6	17	29	-12	12	7th (Relegated)	Quarter Finals
2018	Segunda Divisão	11	6	1	4	19	19	0	19	4th	First Round
2019	Segunda Divisão	5	1	0	4	6	15	-9	3	5th in Group A	Preliminary Round
2020	Copa FFTL	4	1	0	3	7	15	-8	3	4th in Group A	First Round
2021	Segunda Divisão	4	1	1	2	5	6	-1	4	3rd in Group A	-
2023	Segunda Divisão	7	2	2	3	8	9	-1	8	3rd	-
2025	Segunda Divisão	6	1	2	3	8	12	-4	5	6th (Relegated)	-

== Continental record ==
Season	Competition	Round	Club	Home	Away	Aggregate
2005	ASEAN Club Championship	Group A	(Cambodia) Nagacorp	3–0		3rd
2005	ASEAN Club Championship	Group A	(Malaysia) Pahang	0–8		3rd
2005	ASEAN Club Championship	Group A	(Vietnam) Hoàng Anh Gia Lai	1–14		3rd

== Former coaches ==
- Alberto Jaime Ribeiro
