= DIT FC =

- Full name: Dili Institute of Technology Futebol Clube
- Founded: 2002; 24 years ago
- Ground: Municipal Stadium
- Capacity: 5,000
- Manager: Manuel Pinto
- League: Liga Futebol Timor-Leste
- 2025: 5th
| Home colours | Away colours |

Dili Institute of Technology FC or DIT FC is a professional football club of East Timor based in Dili. The team plays in the Liga Futebol Timor-Leste in the Primeira Divisão. In 2025 the team finished 5th in the Primeira Divisão.

Francisco Cosme da Souza Gama was their technical director.

== Squad List ==
Current Squad as of January 2026 for the Taça da Liga Timor-Leste 2026

Note: Flags indicate national team as defined under FIFA eligibility rules; some limited exceptions apply. Players may hold more than one non-FIFA nationality.

| No. | Pos. | Nation | Player |
|---|---|---|---|
| 1 | GK | TLS | Valdinho M. F. Mouzinho |
| 4 | | TLS | Anizo M. Boavida |
| 5 | | TLS | Inigo M. F. Braz |
| 12 | | TLS | Leonardo G. Dos Barros |
| 3 | | TLS | Zito Evaristo Moreira (Captain) |
| 8 | | TLS | Nelson Da C. Boavida |
| 18 | | TLS | Daniel Appiah |
| 7 | | TLS | Jose Dos Santos |
| 17 | | TLS | Serafin Da S. Brito |
| 10 | | TLS | Kouda Affo Nlah |
| 9 | | TLS | Elvis M. Da C. Da Silva |

| No. | Pos. | Nation | Player |
|---|---|---|---|
| 25 | | TLS | Honorio A. Da S. Duarte |
| 4 | | TLS | Granho Da Cunha Ku |
| 20 | | TLS | Natalino Salsinha |
| 2 | | TLS | Jose Bano Soares |
| 16 | | TLS | Savani Lay |
| 22 | | TLS | Lamberto C. Xiemens |
| 19 | | TLS | Florindo M. Soares |
| 23 | | TLS | Figores Dias Sacramento |
| 15 | | TLS | Fernando De J. Freitas |
| 13 | | TLS | Augostu F. C. D. C. Ximenes |
| 14 | | TLS | Tito De A. Fereira |
| 11 | | TLS | Xavier Silabait |

== Club Honours ==
=== Liga Futebol Timor-Leste Segunda Divisão ===
- Champions 2017, 2019, 2023

== Competitive record ==
Competitive records from RSSSF

| Season | Competition | Pld | W | D | L | GF | GA | GD | Pts | Position | National Cup: Taça 12 de Novembro |
|---|---|---|---|---|---|---|---|---|---|---|---|
| 2015 | - | - | - | - | - | - | - | - | - | - | Runner-Up |
| 2016 | Primeira Divisão | 14 | 4 | 5 | 5 | 16 | 16 | 0 | 17 | 7th (Relegated) | Semi-Finals |
| 2017 | Segunda Divisão | 10 | 8 | 1 | 1 | 46 | 11 | +35 | 25 | 1st in Group A (Promoted) | Semi-Finals |
| 2018 | Primeira Divisão | 14 | 3 | 3 | 8 | 21 | 29 | -8 | 12 | 7th (Relegated) | Quarter-Finals |
| 2019 | Segunda Divisão | 5 | 3 | 2 | 0 | 18 | 5 | +13 | 11 | 1st in Group B Won Final (Promoted) | Round of 16 |
| 2020 | Copa FFTL | 4 | 2 | 0 | 2 | 7 | 5 | +2 | 6 | 3rd in Group A | Semi-Finals |
| 2021 | Primeira Divisão | 6 | 1 | 1 | 4 | 6 | 12 | -6 | 4 | 7th (Relegated) | - |
| 2023 | Segunda Divisão | 7 | 6 | 1 | 0 | 25 | 7 | +18 | 19 | 1st (Promoted) | - |
| 2024 | Copa FFTL | 3 | 1 | 2 | 0 | 12 | 2 | +10 | 5 | 2nd in Group A (Qualified) Semi-Finals | - |
| 2025 | Primeira Divisão | 9 | 1 | 7 | 1 | 10 | 12 | 11 | 10 | 5th | - |
