= Aitana FC =

- Full name: Aitana Futebol Clube
- Founded: 1981; 44 years ago
- Ground: Municipal Stadium
- Capacity: 5,000
- Manager: Luis Simões
- League: Liga Futebol Timor-Leste
- 2025: 1st, Segunda Division
Home colours	Away colours

Aitana FC is a professional football club of East Timor based in Dili. The team plays in the Liga Futebol Timor-Leste in the Primeira Divisão.

== Competition records ==
Competitive records from RSSSF. Exact results prior to 2016 are unknown.

Season	Competition	Pld	W	D	L	GF	GA	GD	Pts	Position	National Cup: Taça 12 de Novembro
2015											Winners
2016	Primeira Divisão	14	3	3	8	16	25	−9	12	8th (Relegated)	Second Round
2017	Segunda Divisão	12	5	2	5	21	24	−3	17	4th in Group B	First Round
2018	Segunda Divisão	11	4	4	3	17	15	+2	16	6th	Quarter Finals
2019	Segunda Divisão	5	4	1	0	16	2	+14	13	1st in Group A Lost Final (Promoted)	Quarter Finals
2020	Copa FFTL	4	1	0	3	6	13	−7	3	4th in Group C	Round of 16
2021	Primeira Divisão	6	1	2	3	6	8	−2	5	6th	
2023	Primeira Divisão	8	1	1	6	11	25	-14	4	9th (Relegated)	
2025	Segunda Divisão	6	4	1	1	9	5	+4	13	1st (Promoted)	

== Honours ==
=== Segunda Divisão ===
- 2019: Runners up
- 2025: Champions

=== Taça 12 de Novembro ===
- 2015: Champions
