= Liga Futebol Timor-Leste Segunda Divisão =

- Organising body: FFTL
- Founded: 2015; 11 years ago
- Country: Timor Leste
- Number of clubs: 7
- Level on pyramid: 2
- Promotion to: Primeira Divisão
- Relegation to: Terceira Divisão
- Domestic cup: Taça 12 de Novembro
- Current champions: Aitana FC
- Most championships: DIT FC (2 titles)
- Current: 2025 Liga Futebol Timor-Leste #Segunda Divisaun

Liga Futebol Timor-Leste Segunda Divisão, often referred to as the Segunda Divisão, is second-highest division of the Liga Futebol Timor-Leste and second-highest overall in the Timorense football league system.

== History ==
The Segunda Divisão was founded in 2016 alongside the Primeira Divisão as part of the formation of the Liga Futebol Amadora. The inaugural season featured 13 teams, split into two groups and a final taking place between the winners of each group.

Over time the competition format would change multiple times, either using the 2 group and finals system or using one combined league table.

In 2017 and in 2019 teams from the Segunda Divisão were relegated to the Terceira Divisão.

In 2020 the competition was renamed from the Liga Futebol Amadora to the Liga Futebol Timor-Leste.

== Overview ==
=== Promotion from Segunda Divisão ===
Two finalists of the league get a promotion to Primeira Divisão.

=== Relegation to Terceira Divisão ===
Previously there have been instances of teams being relegated to the Terceira Divisão. There have however been multiple instances where no clubs have been relegated, despite finishing bottom of the Segunda Divisão table.

== Championship History ==
Year	Champion	Result	Runners-up
2016	Cacusan CF	2-1	FC Zebra
2017	Atlético Ultramar	2-0	DIT F.C.
2018	Assalam FC	-	Lalenok United
2019	DIT FC	3-1	Aitana FC
2021	Emmanuel FC	2-0	AS Académica
2023	DIT FC	-	AS Marca
2025	Aitana FC	-	Santa Cruz
