= Sporting Clube de Timor =

East Timorese football club

Sporting Timor
- Full name: Sporting Clube de Timor
- Nickname: O Sol Nascente (The Rising Sun)
- Founded: 1938; 88 years ago
- Ground: Kampo Demokrasia, Dili
- Capacity: 1,000
- Manager: Manuel da Costa Pinto
- League: LFA2
- 2016: 4th in Group A
Home colours	Away colours

Sporting Clube de Timor is an East Timorese football club based in Dili. It was founded in 1938 by 25 members led by Jaime Montalvão de Carvalho, first president of the club, José António Montalvão dos Santos e Silva, and Jacinto Montalvão dos Santos e Silva. They currently dispute the Liga Futebol Amadora Segunda Divisão. And it also participates in other competitions organized by East Timor Football Federation such as Copa FFTL and Taça 12 de Novembro. They're one of the oldest football club in Timor Leste.

== Squad (2020) ==

2020 COPA FFTL starting lineup

=== Starting Players ===
1. Cesar de Jesus(GK)
21. Canisio Santos
4. Américo Martins
12. Lesi Atok
6. Lexy Atok
16. Florindo Soares
5. Zito Moreira
7. Leandro Amaral
8. Lesy Atok
9. Michael Luz
10. Bonifácio Cabral

Head Coach:
Muisés Silva

Updated in 2020.

=== Reserve players ===
31. Deomentino Madeira (GK)
24. Alexandr Cruz
3. Francisco Locatelli
7. Estevão Soares
2. Mariano Mascarenha
25. Rosário Lopes
22. João Ximenes

== Honours ==
- Campeonato Nacional da 1ª Divisão champions: 1967, 1968

== Competition records ==
=== Liga Futebol Amadora ===
- 2016 Segunda Divisao: 4th place in Group A

=== Taça 12 de Novembro ===
- 2016: 1st Round
