= Taça 12 de Novembro =

- Organiser(s): Liga Futebol Timor-Leste
- Founded: 2013; 13 years ago
- Region: Timor Leste
- Teams: 20
- Domestic cup: Super Taça
- Current champions: Lalenok United (1st title)
- Most championships: Atlético Ultramar (2 titles)

Taça 12 de Novembro is an annual knockout association football competition in men's domestic Timor football. This competition was organised by Liga Futebol Timor-Leste and FFTL.

== Competition format ==
Beginning in August, the competition proceeds as a knockout tournament throughout, consisting of three rounds. A semi-final and then a final are held in September.

== Qualification for subsequent competitions ==
=== Super Taça Liga Futebol Amadora ===
The Taça 12 de Novembro winners qualify for the following season's single-match Super Taça Liga Futebol Amadora, the traditional season opener played against the previous season's Liga Futebol Amadora champions (or the Liga Futebol Amadora runners-up if the Taça 12 de Novembro winners also won the league – the double).

== Venues ==
Fixtures in the 3 rounds of the competition, the semi-finals and final are played at a neutral venue Municipal Stadium.

== List of champions ==
- 2013: Dili Leste
- 2014: no information
- 2015: Aitana FC
- 2016: AS Ponta Leste
- 2017: Atlético Ultramar
- 2018: Atlético Ultramar
- 2019: Lalenok United
- 2020: Lalenok United
