= Timor-Leste at the 2018 Asian Games =

- IOC code: TLS
- NOC: National Olympic Committee of Timor Leste

in Jakarta and Palembang August 18 – September 2
- Competitors: 65 in 12 sports
- Medals: Gold 0 Silver 0 Bronze 0 Total 0

Asian Games appearances (overview)
- 2002; 2006; 2010; 2014; 2018; 2022; 2026

Timor-Leste participated at the 2018 Asian Games in Jakarta and Palembang, Indonesia, from 18 August to 2 September 2018. The country is planned to send 64 athletes who compete in 12 different sports.

== Competitors ==
The following is a list of the number of competitors representing Timor-Leste that participated at the Games:

Sport	Men	Women	Total
Athletics	3	3	6
Boxing	5	0	5
Cycling	3	2	5
Football	20	0	20
Karate	2	3	5
Pencak silat	5	0	5
Shooting	1	1	2
Swimming	0	1	1
Taekwondo	3	3	6
Tennis	2	0	2
Volleyball	2	2	4
Weightlifting	4	0	4
Total	50	15	65

== Athletics ==
Timor-Leste entered six athletes (3 men's and 3 women's) to participate in the athletics competition at the Games.

== Boxing ==
Men

Athlete	Event	Round of 32	Round of 16	Quarterfinals	Semifinals	Final	Rank
Athlete	Event	Opposition Result	Opposition Result	Opposition Result	Opposition Result	Opposition Result	Rank
Jose Barreto Quintas Da Silva	–49 kg	Bye	MB Kali (INA); L 0–5	did not advance			
Joao Barbosa Neto Ximenes	–52 kg	Bye	A Suguro (INA); L 0–5	did not advance			
Elisio Raimundo Gaio	–56 kg	C Butdee (THA); L 0–5	did not advance				
Savon Ramos Monteiro	–60 kg	Bye	R Juntrong (THA); L 0–4	did not advance			
Apolinario Da Costa Alves	–64 kg	Wang G (CHN); L 0–5	did not advance				

== Cycling ==
=== BMX ===
Athlete	Event	Seeding run		Motos		Final	
Athlete	Event	Time	Rank	Point	Rank	Time	Rank
Valeria Bakhita França Sarmento	Women's race	54.62	10	15	5	did not advance	

=== Mountain biking ===
Athlete	Event	Seeding run		Final	
Athlete	Event	Time	Rank	Time	Rank
Diamantino Carvalho	Men's cross-country	—N/a		−4 laps	19
Eugénio Manuel dos Santos Tilman	Men's cross-country	—N/a		−5 laps	21
Matias Li	Men's downhill	15:38.661	9	2:57.172	8
Cabral Marques	Women's downhill	4:31.670	8	4:23.817	8

== Football ==
Timor-Leste competed in the Group C at the men's football event.

Summary

Team	Event	Group Stage				Round of 16	Quarterfinal	Semifinal	Final / BM	
Team	Event	Opposition score	Opposition score	Opposition score	Rank	Opposition score	Opposition score	Opposition score	Opposition score	Rank
Timor-Leste men's	Men's tournament	China; L 0–6	United Arab Emirates; L 1–4	Syria; L 2–5	4	did not advance				24

=== Men's tournament ===
Roster

The following is the Timor-Leste squad in the men's football tournament of the 2018 Asian Games.

Head coach: (Japan) Norio Tsukitate

No.	Pos.	Player	Date of birth (age)	Club
1	GK	Aderito	15 May 1997 (aged 21)	(East Timor Football Federation) Atlético Ultramar
2	DF	Julião	2 July 1998 (aged 20)	(East Timor Football Federation) SLB Benfica
3	DF	José Guterres	24 April 1998 (aged 20)	(East Timor Football Federation) Boavista
4	DF	Cândido Oliveira	2 December 1997 (aged 20)	(East Timor Football Federation) Ponta Leste
5	DF	Jorge Sabas (captain)	5 December 1997 (aged 20)	(East Timor Football Federation) Karketu Dili
6	MF	Nataniel	25 March 1995 (aged 23)	(East Timor Football Federation) Boavista
7	FW	Rufino Gama	20 June 1998 (aged 20)	(East Timor Football Federation) Karketu Dili
8	MF	Boavida Olegário*	24 October 1994 (aged 23)	(East Timor Football Federation) Karketu Dili
9	FW	Silvério Garcia*	2 April 1994 (aged 24)	(East Timor Football Federation) Ponta Leste
10	FW	Henrique Cruz	6 December 1997 (aged 20)	(East Timor Football Federation) Boavista
11	MF	Gelvánio Costa	8 October 1998 (aged 19)	(East Timor Football Federation) Karketu Dili
12	MF	José Fonseca*	19 September 1994 (aged 23)	(East Timor Football Federation) Cacusan
13	DF	Gumário	18 October 2001 (aged 16)	(East Timor Football Federation) Boavista
14	MF	Avigmas	24 December 1999 (aged 18)	(East Timor Football Federation) Boavista
15	MF	Armindo	18 April 1998 (aged 20)	(East Timor Football Federation) Académica
16	DF	Ricky*	17 June 1994 (aged 24)	(East Timor Football Federation) SLB Benfica
17	MF	Osvaldo Belo	18 October 2000 (aged 17)	(East Timor Football Federation) Karketu Dili
18	MF	Filomeno	5 August 2000 (aged 18)	(East Timor Football Federation) SLB Benfica
19	FW	Frangcyatma Alves	27 January 1997 (aged 21)	(East Timor Football Federation) Cacusan
20	GK	Fagio Augusto	29 April 1997 (aged 21)	(East Timor Football Federation) Karketu Dili

* Over-aged player.

Group C

Pos	Team	Pld	W	D	L	GF	GA	GD	Pts	Qualification
1	China	3	3	0	0	11	1	+10	9	Advance to knockout stage
2	Syria	3	2	0	1	6	5	+1	6	Advance to knockout stage
3	United Arab Emirates	3	1	0	2	5	4	+1	3	Advance to knockout stage
4	East Timor	3	0	0	3	3	15	−12	0	
5	Iraq	0	0	0	0	0	0	0	0	Withdrew, replaced by UAE

Source: Asian Games 2018
Rules for classification: Group stage tiebreakers
14 August 2018
16:00 UTC+7

China	6–0	East Timor
Zhang Yuning 4'; Zhang Yuan 20'; Gao Zhunyi 27', 47'; Wei Shihao 33'; Yao Junsheng 36'	Report

Jalak Harupat Stadium, Soreang
Referee: Çarymyrat Kurbanow (Turkmenistan)

16 August 2018
16:00 UTC+7

East Timor	1–4	United Arab Emirates
Gama 87'	Report	Suroor 2'; Sultan 10'; Z. Al-Ameri 19', 61'

Jalak Harupat Stadium, Soreang
Referee: Nasrullo Kabirov (Tajikistan)

19 August 2018
19:00 UTC+7

East Timor	2–5	Syria
Gama 15'; Garcia 85'	Report	Hannan 33'; Shalha 42', 54', 90+1'; Koaeh 50'

Wibawa Mukti Stadium, Cikarang
Referee: Zaid Thamer Mohammed (Iraq)

== Karate ==
Timor-Leste participated in the karate competition at the Games with five athletes (2 men's and 3 women's).

== Pencak silat ==
Federasaun Silat Timor-Leste (FESTIL) entered their athletes compete in the pencak silat event at the Games.

Seni

Athlete	Event	Preliminary		Final	
Athlete	Event	Result	Rank	Result	Rank
Paulo Futre dos Reis	Men's tunggal	DSQ	–	did not advance	

Tanding

Athlete	Event	Round of 16	Quarterfinals	Semifinals	Final	
Athlete	Event	Opposition Result	Opposition Result	Opposition Result	Opposition Result	Rank
Joaquim Afonso Gomes	Men's –55 kg	Bye	B Thammavongsa (LAO); L 0–5	did not advance		
Silvestre dos Santos Barbosa	Men's –60 kg	Bye	MH Amzad (MAS); L 0–5	did not advance		
Mateus da Silva Conceção	Men's –60 kg	J Loon (PHI); L 0–5	did not advance			
David No-Ano Ximenes	Men's –70 kg	KHA Putra (INA); L 0–5	did not advance			

== Shooting ==
Men

Athlete	Event	Qualification		Final	
Athlete	Event	Points	Rank	Points	Rank
Nelson da Silva	10 m air rifle	477.3	44	did not advance	

Women

Athlete	Event	Qualification		Final	
Athlete	Event	Points	Rank	Points	Rank
Cristina de Jesus Ximenes	10 m air pistol	470	43	did not advance	

== Swimming ==
Timor-Leste entered one women's swimmer to compete at the Games.

Women

Athlete	Event	Heats		Final	
Athlete	Event	Time	Rank	Time	Rank
Imelda Felicyta Ximenes Belo	50 m freestyle	34.21	31	did not advance	
Imelda Felicyta Ximenes Belo	100 m freestyle	1:16.91	25	did not advance	
Imelda Felicyta Ximenes Belo	200 m freestyle	2:56.50	24	did not advance	
Imelda Felicyta Ximenes Belo	50 m butterfly	39.57	27	did not advance	

== Taekwondo ==
Federasaun Taekwondo Timor–Leste (FTTL) entered their taekwondo practitioners competed at the Games.

Kyorugi

Athlete	Event	Round of 32	Round of 16	Quarterfinal	Semifinal	Final	
Athlete	Event	Opposition score	Opposition score	Opposition score	Opposition score	Opposition score	Rank
Nilton Corte-Real	Men's −58 kg	Thipphakone Kuangmany (LAO); L 18–40	did not advance				
Claudio Mousaco	Men's −63 kg	Khurram Mehtarshoev (TJK); L 10–32	did not advance				
Arcenio Soares	Men's −68 kg	Muhammad Saleh (INA); L 11–22	did not advance				
Ana Bello	Women's −49 kg	Bye	Kang Bo-ra (KOR); L 2–45	did not advance			
Maria Madeira Barros	Women's −53 kg	Bye	Mariska Halinda (INA); L 3–28	did not advance			
Evalinda Nadeak	Women's −57 kg	Charos Kayumova (UZB); L 2–35	did not advance				

== Tennis ==
Men

Athlete	Event	Round of 64	Round of 32	Round of 16	Quarterfinals	Semifinals	Final	
Athlete	Event	Opposition Score	Opposition Score	Opposition Score	Opposition Score	Opposition Score	Opposition Score	Rank
Frederico Soares Sarmento	Singles	AJ Tang (HKG); L 0–6, 0–6	did not advance					
Nazário Fernandes Gusmão	Singles	J Patrombon (PHI); L 1–6, 0–6	did not advance					
Nazário Fernandes Gusmão; Frederico Soares Sarmento	Doubles	Bye	N Kadchapanan / W Trongcharoenchaikul (THA); L 0–6, 2–6	did not advance				

== Volleyball ==
=== Beach ===
Two Timor-Leste beach volleyball teams (one men's pair and one women's pair) will compete at the Games.

Athlete	Event	Preliminary round	Standing	Round of 16	Quarterfinals	Semifinals	Final / BM	
Athlete	Event	Opposition Score	Standing	Opposition Score	Opposition Score	Opposition Score	Opposition Score	Rank
Inocêncio Fernandes Xavier; Robson Fernandes Xavier	Men's	Mirzaali – Raoufi (IRI): L 0–2; Nguyen – Ly (VIE): L 0–2; Hasegawa – Shimizu (JPN): L 0–2	4	did not advance				
Letícia Febriana Alin de Souza; Adilijia Caminha	Women's	Numwong – Hongpak (THA): L 0–2; Ratnasari – Eka (INA): L 0–2; Rachenko – Yeropkina (KAZ): L 0–2; Futami – Hasegawa (JPN): L 0–2	5	did not advance				

== Weightlifting ==
Men

Athlete	Event	Snatch		Clean & Jerk		Total	Rank
Athlete	Event	Result	Rank	Result	Rank	Total	Rank
Norberto dos Reis Gama	−56 kg	60	10	82	10	142	10
Gilton Fátima Guterres da Costa	−62 kg	80	13	90	13	170	13
José Martins Garcia Valente	−77 kg	82	20	90	18	172	18
Edeliju Mesquita	−85 kg	73	12	95	12	168	12
