= 2017 LFA Primeira =

Primera Divisaun
- Season: 2017
- Champions: Karketu Dili (1st)
- Relegated: Porto Taibesi; FC Zebra
- Matches: 56
- Goals: 176 (3.14 per match)
- Top goalscorer: (Brazil) Tingga (13 goals)
- Biggest home win: Karketu Dili 9–1 Cacusan (30 July 2017)
- Biggest away win: Porto Taibesi 1–10 Karketu Dili (6 August 2017)
- Highest scoring: Karketu Dili 10–3 Zebra (23 April 2017)
- Longest winning run: 8 games, Karketu Dili
- Longest unbeaten run: 11 games, Karketu Dili
- Longest winless run: 7 games, Zebra
- Longest losing run: 5 games, Porto Taibesi
- All statistics correct as of 16 September 2017.

The 2017 LFA Primeira is the second season of the Liga Futebol Amadora Primeira Divisão. The season began on February 18 and finished on September 16.

Sport Laulara e Benfica is the current defending champions.

All Primeira Divisão games are played at the Baucau Municipal Stadium and Malibaca Yamato Stadium. Primeira Divisão games used Dili Municipal Stadium for matchday 12 on 10-13 August 2017, matchday 13 on 1-4 September 2017 and three matches in matchday 14 on 7-9 September 2017.

== Stadiums ==
Primary venues used in the 2017 LFA Primeira

Stadium	Location	Capacity
Baucau Municipal Stadium	(Baucau District) Baucau	5,000
Municipal Stadium	Dili	5,000
Malibaca Yamato Stadium	(Bobonaro District) Maliana	5,000

== Teams ==
There are 8 teams that will play this season.

=== from Primeira ===
Aitana and DIT F.C. were relegated to 2017 Segunda Divisao after finished 7th and bottom place of 2016 Primeira Divisao.

=== to Primeira ===
Cacusan and FC Zebra promoted to 2017 Primeira Divisao after securing place as champions and runners-up in 2016 Segunda Divisao.

=== Locations ===
Locations of the 2017 LFA Primeira teams.

=== Personnel ===
Club	City / Area	Coach	Captain
Académica	Dili		
Cacusan	Becora, Dili		
Carsae	Dili	(Indonesia) Rochy Putiray	
Karketu Dili	Dili	(Chile) Simón Elissetche	
Ponta Leste	Dili		
Porto Taibesi	Dili	(Timor-Leste) Miro Baldo Bento	(Timor-Leste) Miro Baldo Bento
Sport Laulara e Benfica	Laulara, Aileu	(South Korea) Kim Shin-hwan	(Timor-Leste) Nidio Alves
Zebra	Baucau		(Timor-Leste) Helder Mota Ricardo

== Foreign players ==
Restricting the number of foreign players strictly to four per team. A team could use four foreign players on the field each game.

As of 13 July 2017

Club	Player 1	Player 2	Player 3	Player 4
Académica	(Cameroon) Joseph Koomson			
Cacusan	(Indonesia) Moses Banggo			
Carsae				
Karketu Dili	(Chile) Antonio Vega	(Brazil) Alan Leandro	(Brazil) Tingga	
Ponta Leste	(Brazil) Antonio Teles	(Ghana) Edmond Hezzed	(Japan) Shota Tokonaga	
Porto Taibesi	(Cameroon) Tassiou Bako			
Sport Laulara e Benfica	(Ghana) Michael Debrah	(Ghana) Boateng		
FC Zebra	(Ghana) Daniel Kwame	(Ghana) Devis Amegashie	(Brazil) Marco de Lima	

== League table ==
Pos	Team	Pld	W	D	L	GF	GA	GD	Pts	Qualification or relegation
1	Karketu Dili (C)	14	8	4	2	43	15	+28	28	
2	Ponta Leste	14	7	4	3	28	16	+12	25	
3	Carsae	14	6	5	3	21	16	+5	23	
4	SLB Laulara	14	6	3	5	20	15	+5	21	
5	Académica	14	4	6	4	14	12	+2	18	
6	Cacusan	14	4	6	4	22	29	−7	18	
7	Zebra (R)	14	2	6	6	17	29	−12	12	Relegation to the 2018 LFA Segunda
8	Porto Taibesse (R)	14	1	2	11	11	44	−33	5	Relegation to the 2018 LFA Segunda

Updated to match(es) played on 16 September 2017. Source: Liga Futebol Amadora FIFA
Rules for classification: 1) points; 2) goal difference; 3) number of goals scored.
(C) Champions; (R) Relegated

== Result table ==
Home \ Away	ACA	CCS	CAR	KAR	POL	POR	SLB	ZEB
Académica		1–1	0–0	1–2	0–1	2–1	1–2	1–0
Cacusan	2–2		2–3	0–0	3–2	3–3	2–1	1–2
Carsae	1–1	1–1		1–1	1–0	5–1	1–3	1–1
Karketu Dili	0–1	9–1	3–2		1–1	3–0	1–0	10–3
Ponta Leste	1–1	3–2	2–1	1–2		5–0	2–2	0–0
Porto Taibesse	1–0	1–2	0–1	1–10	0–4		0–2	1–4
SLB Laulara	0–0	0–1	0–1	2–0	2–3	2–1		3–1
FC Zebra	0–3	1–1	1–2	1–1	1–3	1–1	1–1	

Updated to match(es) played on 16 September 2017. Source: Liga Futebol Amadora
Legend: Blue = home team win; Yellow = draw; Red = away team win.

== Season statistics ==
=== Top scorers ===
As of matches played on 16 September 2017.

Rank	Player	Club	Goals
1	(Brazil) Tingga	Karketu Dili	13
2	(Chile) Antonio Vega	Karketu Dili	12
3	(Brazil) Alan Leandro	Karketu Dili	10
4	(Timor-Leste) Edit Savio	Carsae	9
5	(Timor-Leste) Joao Pedro	Sport Laulara e Benfica	7
6	(Timor-Leste) Silveiro Garcia	Ponta Leste	6
7	(Brazil) Marco de Lima	FC Zebra	5
7	(Timor-Leste) Nidio Alves	Sport Laulara e Benfica	5
9	(Timor-Leste) Armindo Almeida	Porto Taibesse	4
10	(Timor-Leste) Ricardo Maia	Ponta Leste	3
10	(Timor-Leste) Anggisu Barbosa	Académica	3
10	(Indonesia) Moses Banggo	Cacusan	3
10	(Timor-Leste) Boavida Olegario	Karketu Dili	3

== See also ==
- 2017 LFA Segunda
- 2017 Taça 12 de Novembro
- 2017 LFA Super Taça
- 2017 LFA Segunda Divisao Promotion Playoff
