= Elias Mesquita =

Timorese footballer

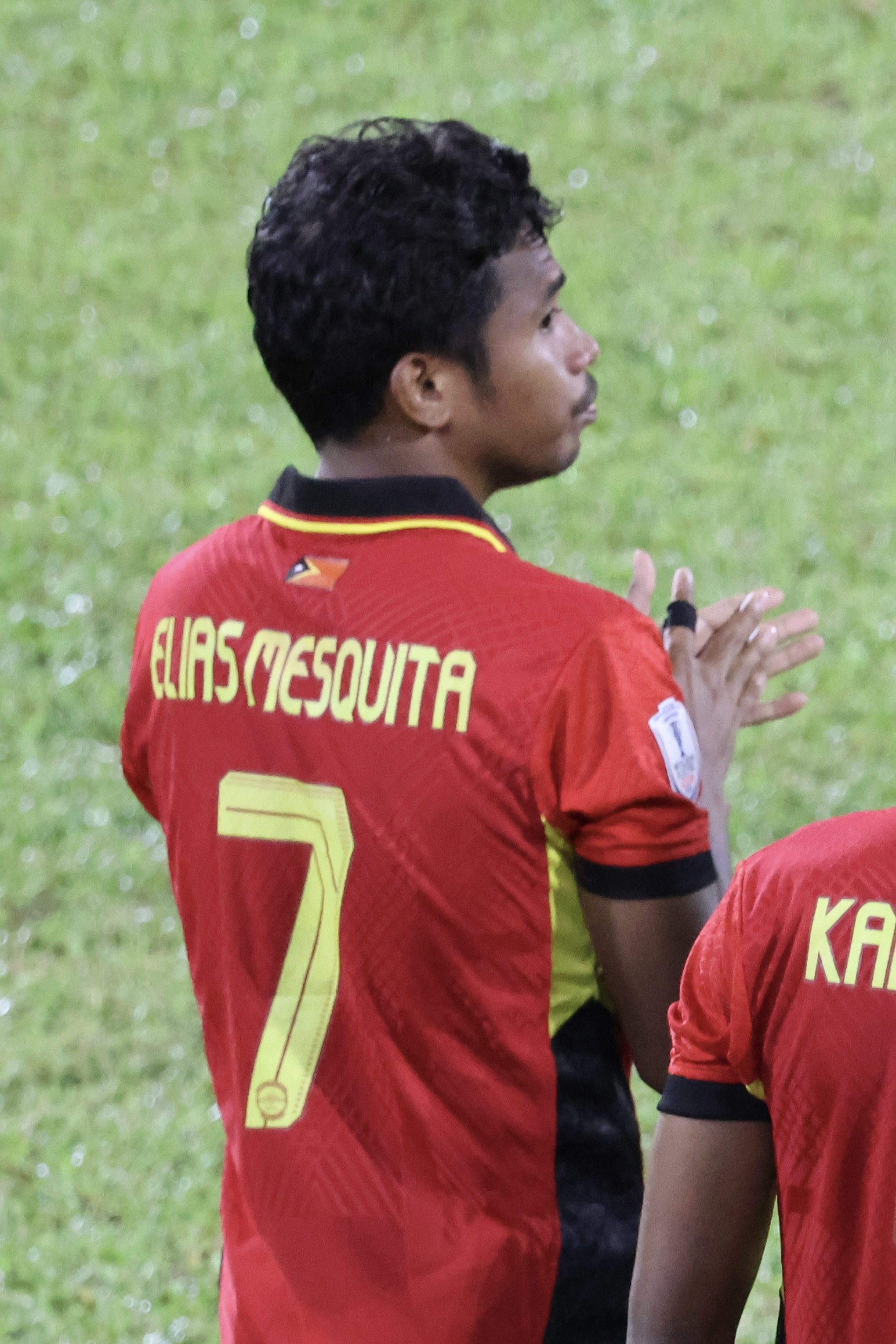
- Mesquita playing for Timor-Leste in 2024

Personal information
- Full name: Elias Joao da Costa Ximenes Mesquita
- Date of birth: 27 March 2002 (age 24)
- Place of birth: Fatuhada, East Timor
- Height: 1.66 m (5 ft 5 in)
- Position: Forward

Team information
- Current team: AS Ponta Leste

Senior career*
Years	Team	Apps	(Gls)
2019–2022	Lalenok United		
2022–2023	Assalam		
2023	Kota Ranger	9	(7)
2024–2025	Indera	9	(8)
2025–	Ponta Leste		(3)

International career^{‡}
2018	Timor-Leste U16		(1)
2020	Timor-Leste U19		(1)
2021–2023	Timor-Leste U23	10	(2)
2019–	Timor-Leste	16	(0)
- * Club domestic league appearances and goals as of 14 November 2025 ‡ National team caps and goals as of 7 January 2025

Elias Joao da Costa Ximenes Mesquita (born 27 March 2002) is a Timorese professional footballer who plays as a forward for AS Ponta Leste and the Timor-Leste national team.

== Club career ==
=== Lelenok United ===
Mesquita began his career with Lalenok United, winning the domestic treble in his first full year. He also gained continental match experience via the 2020 AFC Cup against PSM Makassar the following year.

Lalenok United managed to win a tournament organised by the East Timor Football Federation in late 2020 namely the 2020 Copa FFTL, after the regular season was cancelled as a result of the COVID-19 pandemic. Mesquita scored Lalenok's first goal and was man of the match in that final. The team was scheduled to participate in the 2021 AFC Cup for the second time running, but the pandemic also caused the AFC to annul the matches of the group Lalenok was in.

=== Assalam ===
After finishing as runners-up to Karketu Dili in the league for the 2021 season, Lalenok United folded the next year. Mesquita moved to Assalam for the 2023 season, finishing in sixth place.

=== Kota Ranger ===
After the season finished, Mesquita moved to Bruneian club Kota Ranger and scored twice on his debut in a dramatic match on 24 May where the Rangers led the game until the 90th minute in a 3–4 lost against Kasuka, the winning goal scored at the 10th minute of injury time. He finished the season with seven goals to his name.

=== Indera ===
Mesquita stayed in Brunei and joined Indera for the 2024–25 season. On 22 September 2024, he scored his first hat-trick in Brunei in a 10–0 victory against Lun Bawang becoming the first East Timorese player to score a hat-trick in the Brunei Super League.

=== Ponta Leste ===
Mesquita returned to his country in April 2025, joining AS Ponta Leste.

== Career statistics ==
=== International ===
As of matches played 15 October 2024.

National team	Year	Apps	Goals
Timor-Leste	2019	1	0
Timor-Leste	2020	0	0
Timor-Leste	2021	4	0
Timor-Leste	2022	3	0
Timor-Leste	2023	2	0
Timor-Leste	2024	4	0
Total		14	0

== Honours ==
=== Club ===
Lalenok United

- LFA Primeira Divisão: 2019
- Taça 12 de Novembro (2): 2019, 2020
- LFA Super Taça: 2019
- Copa FFTL: 2020
