= Liga Futebol Timor-Leste =

Association football league in Timor-Leste

- Founded: 2015; 11 years ago
- Country: Timor-Leste
- Confederation: AFC
- Divisions: Primeira Divisão; Segunda Divisão; Terceira Divisão
- Number of clubs: 10 (Primeira Divisão); 7 (Segunda Divisão)
- Level on pyramid: 1–2
- Domestic cup: Taça 12 de Novembro
- International cup(s): AFC Challenge League; ASEAN Club Championship
- Current champions: Karketu Dili
- Most championships: Karketu Dili (4 titles)
- Broadcaster(s): Tve Timor

Liga Futebol Timor-Leste is the overall competition featuring football clubs from Timor-Leste. Sanctioned by the Football Federation of Timor-Leste (FFTL). The competition consists of two main divisions, the Primeira Divisão and Segunda Divisão, however has previously featured a promotion playoff to the Segunda Divisão in 2017, and a third division in 2019. The league has previously featured associated women's competitions in the Liga Feto Timor.

In 2020, the competition was renamed from the Liga Futebol Amadora to the Liga Futebol Timor-Leste. In 2020, the winner of the previous Premeria Divisão was able to represent Timor Leste in the AFC Cup.

In 2020, the competition was cancelled due to the covid pandemic and was replaced by the COPA FFTL.

Liga Futebol Timor-Leste is also the name of the governing body which also organises the Taça 12 de Novembro and the LFA Super Taça.

== List of champions ==
=== Primeira Divisão ===
- 2016: Sport Laulara e Benfica
- 2017: Karketu Dili
- 2018: Boavista TL
- 2019: Lalenok United
- 2020: Replaced by the COPA FFTL. Won by Lalenok United
- 2021: Karketu Dili
- 2022: Not done
- 2023: Karketu Dili
- 2024: Replaced by the COPA FFTL. Only 3 teams competed from the top 2 divisions. Won by São José
- 2025: Karketu Dili
- 2026: Sport Laulara e Benfica

=== Segunda Divisão ===
- 2016: Cacusan
- 2017: Atlético Ultramar
- 2018: Assalam
- 2019: DIT
- 2020: Not done
- 2021: Emmanuel
- 2022: Not done
- 2023: DIT
- 2024: Not done
- 2025: Aitana

=== Terceira Divisão ===
- 2017: Segunda Divisão promotion playoff: Won by Lalenok United
- 2019: Emmanuel
- 2025-26: Ongoing

== LFA Board directors ==
- President: Nilton Gusmão dos Santos
- Vice-president: Alexander Vong
- Director of competition: Martinho Ribeiro
- Executive secretary: Sergio Hornai
