= 2017 Liga Futebol Amadora =

Liga Futebol Amadora
- Season: 2017
- Champions: Primeira: Karketu Dili; Segunda: Atlético Ultramar
- Promoted: to Primeira: Atlético Ultramar, DIT to Segunda: Lalenok United, FC Lero, Fitun Estudante
- Relegated: from Primeira: Porto Taibesi, Zebra from Segunda: Benfica Dili, União, YMCA, Café
- AFC Cup: Karketu Dili
- Matches: 128
- Goals: 465 (3.63 per match)
- Top goalscorer: Primeira: (Brazil) Tingga (13 goals); Segunda: (Timor-Leste) José Santos (16 goals)
- Biggest home win: DIT 9-1 Kablaky (7 April 2017); Karketu Dili 9–1 Cacusan (30 July 2017); Lica-Lica 8-0 União (17 August 2017)
- Biggest away win: Porto Taibesi 1-10 Karketu Dili (6 August 2017)
- Highest scoring: Karketu Dili 10–3 Zebra (23 April 2017)
- Longest winning run: 8 games, Karketu Dili
- Longest unbeaten run: 11 games, Karketu Dili
- Longest winless run: 10 games, Benfica Dili
- Longest losing run: 5 games, Porto Taibesi and Benfica Dili
- All statistics correct as of 16 September 2017.

The 2017 Liga Futebol Amadora is the second season of the Liga Futebol Amadora. The season began on 18 February 2017. The Primeira Divisão began on February 18 and finished on September 16, while the Segunda Divisão began on March 7 and was finished in the final match on September 22.

All Primeira Divisão games are played at the Baucau Municipal Stadium and Malibaca Yamato Stadium, while Segunda Divisão and Segunda Divisão Promotion Playoff games are played at the Dili Municipal Stadium. Primeira Divisão games used Dili Municipal Stadium for matchday 12 on 10-13 August 2017, matchday 13 on 1-4 September 2017 and three matches in matchday 14 on 7-9 September 2017.

Sport Laulara e Benfica is the current Primeira Divisão defending champions.

== League table ==
=== Primera Divisao ===
| Pos | Team | Pld | W | D | L | GF | GA | GD | Pts | Qualification or relegation |
|---|---|---|---|---|---|---|---|---|---|---|
| 1 | Karketu Dili (C) | 14 | 8 | 4 | 2 | 43 | 15 | +28 | 28 | |
| 2 | Ponta Leste | 14 | 7 | 4 | 3 | 28 | 16 | +12 | 25 | |
| 3 | Carsae | 14 | 6 | 5 | 3 | 21 | 16 | +5 | 23 | |
| 4 | SLB Laulara | 14 | 6 | 3 | 5 | 20 | 15 | +5 | 21 | |
| 5 | Académica | 14 | 4 | 6 | 4 | 14 | 12 | +2 | 18 | |
| 6 | Cacusan | 14 | 4 | 6 | 4 | 22 | 29 | −7 | 18 | |
| 7 | Zebra (R) | 14 | 2 | 6 | 6 | 17 | 29 | −12 | 12 | Relegation to the 2018 LFA Segunda |
| 8 | Porto Taibesse (R) | 14 | 1 | 2 | 11 | 11 | 44 | −33 | 5 | Relegation to the 2018 LFA Segunda |

Updated to match(es) played on 16 September 2017. Source: Liga Futebol Amadora FIFA
Rules for classification: 1) points; 2) goal difference; 3) number of goals scored.
(C) Champions; (R) Relegated

=== Segunda Divisao ===
Group A
| Pos | Team | Pld | W | D | L | GF | GA | GD | Pts | Promotion or relegation |
|---|---|---|---|---|---|---|---|---|---|---|
| 1 | DIT F.C. (P, A) | 10 | 8 | 1 | 1 | 48 | 12 | +36 | 25 | Promotion to 2018 LFA |
| 2 | Nagarjo | 10 | 6 | 4 | 0 | 27 | 8 | +19 | 22 | |
| 3 | Santa Cruz | 10 | 5 | 2 | 3 | 18 | 17 | +1 | 17 | |
| 4 | Kablaky | 10 | 3 | 2 | 5 | 14 | 27 | −13 | 11 | |
| 5 | Café (R) | 10 | 2 | 2 | 6 | 14 | 30 | −16 | 8 | Relegated |
| 6 | Sport Dili e Benfica (R) | 10 | 0 | 1 | 9 | 5 | 32 | −27 | 1 | Relegated |

Updated to match(es) played on 24 August 2017. Source: Segunda Divisao Group A
Rules for classification: 1) points; 2) goal difference; 3) number of goals scored.
(A) Advance to Final; (P) Promoted; (R) Relegated

Group B
| Pos | Team | Pld | W | D | L | GF | GA | GD | Pts | Promotion or relegation |
|---|---|---|---|---|---|---|---|---|---|---|
| 1 | Atlético Ultramar (P, A) | 12 | 10 | 1 | 1 | 37 | 12 | +25 | 31 | Promotion to 2018 LFA |
| 2 | Assalam | 12 | 9 | 1 | 2 | 33 | 11 | +22 | 28 | |
| 3 | Lica-Lica Lemorai | 12 | 6 | 3 | 3 | 29 | 16 | +13 | 21 | |
| 4 | Aitana | 12 | 5 | 2 | 5 | 21 | 24 | −3 | 17 | |
| 5 | Sporting Clube de Timor | 12 | 2 | 3 | 7 | 17 | 24 | −7 | 9 | |
| 6 | YMCA FC (East Timor) (R) | 12 | 2 | 3 | 7 | 14 | 34 | −20 | 9 | Relegated |
| 7 | União de Timor (R) | 12 | 1 | 1 | 10 | 13 | 46 | −33 | 4 | Relegated |

Updated to match(es) played on 26 August 2017. Source: Segunda Divisao Group B
Rules for classification: 1) points; 2) goal difference; 3) number of goals scored.
(A) Advance to Final; (P) Promoted; (R) Relegated

== Segunda Divisao Promotion Playoff ==
=== First round ===
This round match held between 16 and 22 May 2017.

| Team 1 | Score | Team 2 |
|---|---|---|
| AS Lero | 1-3 | Liquica FC |
| FC Lero | 3-1 | FC Aimo |
| União Tokodede | 3-0 | Karau Fuik |
| Fitun Estudante | 2-1 | Emanuel FC |
| Irmãos Unidos | 2-0 (aet) | FC Leopa |
| Lalenok United | 6-1 | LA Matebian |

=== Second round ===
This round match held between 23 and 24 May 2017. União Tokodede and Lalenok United received a bye.

| Team 1 | Score | Team 2 |
|---|---|---|
| Liquica FC | 1-2 | FC Lero |
| Fitun Estudante | 2-0 | Irmãos Unidos |

=== Semifinals ===
The semifinals held between 26 and 28 May 2017.

| Team 1 | Score | Team 2 |
|---|---|---|
| União Tokodede | 1-2 | FC Lero |
| Lalenok United | 1-0 | Fitun Estudante |

FC Lero and Lalenok United promoted.

=== Play-off ===
The final held on 31 May 2017 in Municipal Stadium.

| Team 1 | Score | Team 2 |
|---|---|---|
| Fitun Estudante | 2-0 | União Tokodede |

Fitun Estudante promoted.

== See also ==
- 2017 LFA Primeira
- 2017 LFA Segunda
- 2017 Taça 12 de Novembro
- 2017 LFA Super Taça
- 2017 LFA Segunda Divisao Promotion Playoff
