= Simón Elissetche =

Chilean football manager (born 1977)

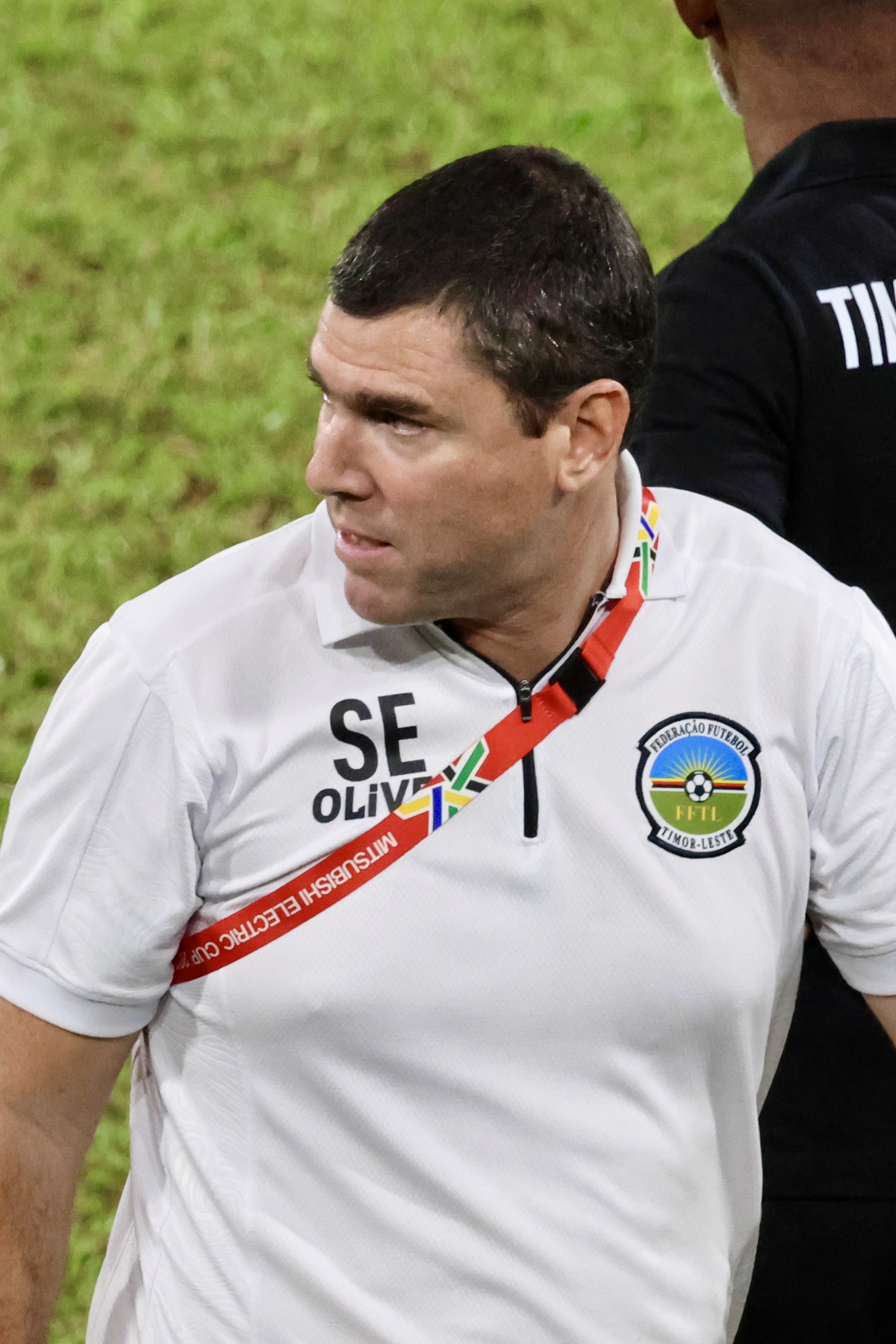
- Ellissetche with East Timor in 2024

Personal information
- Full name: Simón Pablo Elissetche Correa
- Date of birth: 28 September 1977 (age 49)
- Place of birth: Santiago, Chile

Managerial career
- Years: Team
- 2012: PSSB Bireuen
- 2013: Persita Tangerang
- 2013: Persikutim East Kutai
- 2016: Assalam
- 2017: Karketu Dili
- 2017: Timor Leste
- 2018: Aceh United
- 2019: PSAB Great Aceh
- 2020: Lalenok United
- 2021: PSPS Riau
- 2021–2022: PS Siak
- 2024–2025: Timor Leste
- 2024–2025: Timor Leste U23
- 2025: Timor Leste Women
- 2026–: Karketu Dili

Simón Pablo Elissetche Correa (born 28 September 1977) is a Chilean professional football manager. He is the current head coach of Karketu Dili, title holders of Timor Leste's league.

Elissetche previously had already coached Timor-Leste from October to December 2017. Runner-up in the CTFA International Tournament in Taiwan.

== Coaching career ==
=== Early career ===
Ellissetche began his coaching career in Indonesia at the age of 27. He was appointed by Manuel Vega as his assistant coach at PS Kendari Utama. After one year in Indonesia, he returned to Chile to deepen his coaching knowledge.

=== PSSB Bireuen ===
In March 2012, Ellissetche sign a contract with PSSB Bireuen for the Premier Division season 2011–12.

=== Persita Tangerang ===
On 9 June 2013, Ellissetche agreed to a contract with Persita Tangerang. After managing the team for six matches with record of 3 wins, 1 draw and 2 losses, he resigned.

=== Persikutim East Kutai ===
After resigning from Persita, Ellissetche agreed to manage Liga Indonesia First Division club Persikutim East Kutai.

=== Assalam ===
Since February 2016, Ellissetche managed at Assalam in the 2016 Liga Futebol Amadorae. He is the first foreign coach to managed the Timor Leste club and also the first foreigner coach in Timor Leste football history to start the football league after independence from Indonesia on 2002. In Assalam, he bring success to Assalam where the club ended up as runner-up gin the league but it isn't enough to bring the team to the first division.

Ellissetche successfully brought Assalam into the finals of the 2016 Taça 12 de Novembro before they lost to the champions AS Ponta Leste 0–1.

=== Karketu Dili ===
On 21 February 2017, Ellissetche joined Karketu Dili in which he won the 2017 Liga Futebol Amadora with them that year. In the squad, he had three foreign players, including his compatriot Antonio Vega.

=== Timor Leste ===
Ellissetche success in the league was given a head coach job by the East Timor Football Federation to coach the Timor Leste national team on 25 October 2017.

=== Aceh United ===
On 15 January 2018, Ellissetche returned to Indonesia when he accepted the job as new head coach of Liga 2 side Aceh United for the 2018 season. His services were terminated by mutual consent on 19 October 2018.

=== Lalenok United ===
On 5 February 2020, Ellissetche returned to Timor Leste to become Lalenok United head coach. In his first season at the club, he successfully help Lalenok United to win the 2020 Copa FFTL. In the final match which took place at the Estadio Municipal Cafe, Dili, on 27 October 2020, Lalenok defeated SLB Laulara with a score of 2–1.

This success earned Lalenok United a ticket to represent Timor Leste to compete in the 2021 AFC Cup. However the tournament was cancelled following the COVID-19 pandemic.

=== PSPS Riau ===
On 15 June 2021, Ellissetche accepted an offer to become the head coach of PSPS Riau which plays in Liga 2 Indonesia.

=== PS Siak ===
In October 2021, after being fired from his coaching job at PSPS, Ellissetche was appointed coach of Liga 3 Indonesia club, PS Siak. He then successfully led his team to win Liga 3 Riau Zone in his debut season and made it to the national round of 16.

=== Return to Timor Leste ===
After two years without a club, in May 2024, Ellissetche was contracted by the Football Federation of Timor-Leste until December 2024 to coach both the U-23 and senior national teams.

== Honours ==
=== Karketu Deli ===
Liga Futebol Amadora: 2017

=== Lalenok United ===
Copa FFTL: 2020
