= Taça da Liga Timor-Leste 2026 =

East Timor football league season

Taça da Liga Timorense 2026
- Season: 2026
- Dates: 17 January 2026 - 28 February 2026
- Teams: 13
- Champions: Emmanuel FC
- Runner up: Karketu Dili
- Best Player: Nilton dos Reis Carvalho Emmanuel FC
- Top goalscorer: Jardiel Piedade (6 goals) FC Porto Taibesse
- Best goalkeeper: Alexandre Oscar Lima Quintão Emmanuel FC

The 2025-26 Taça da Liga is the first edition of the new Timor-Leste football pre-season league cup. It is organized by the Football Federation of Timor-Leste (FFTL) and features 13 participating teams.

The new competition was announced in December 2025, with the aim of being a pre-season competition before the beginning of the 2026 Liga Futebol Timor-Leste regular season.

== Format ==
The tournament uses a group system, followed by single-elimination knockot matches. The first phase consists of 4 groups of 3 or 4 teams each; the top teams from each group qualify for the semifinals.

The draw for the tournament matches was held on December 1, 2025. The first match will be played on January 17, 2026.

=== Participants ===
The following teams are competing in the competition:

Primera Divisão The best 8 teams from the Primera Divisão 2024–25 season	Segunda Divisão The best 5 teams from the Segunda Divisão 2024-25
Assalam; Atlético Ultramar / Coração FC; DIT; Emmanuel FC; Karketu Dili F.C. (C); AS Marca; Porto Taibesse; Sport Laulara e Benfica	Aitana (C); FIEL; Lica-Lica Lemorai; Nagardjo; Santa Cruz F.C.

== Group stage ==
=== Group A ===
Pos.	Club	W	D	L	GF	GA	GD	Pts
1	Emmanuel FC (Q)	1	1	0	5	0	5	4
2	SL Benfica	1	1	0	3	0	3	4
3	Aitana	0	0	2	0	8	-8	0

17 January
17:00 UTC+9

Emmanuel FC	0–0	SL Benfica
	Report

Estádio Municipal de Díli

25 January
16:00 UTC+9

Aitana	0–3	SL Benfica
	Report	Luis Figo 50'; Faver Duvan 55'; Filomeno Junior 90+1'

Estádio Municipal de Díli

30 January
18:00 UTC+9

Aitana	0–5	Emmanuel FC
	Report	Paulo Godinho 20'; Mario Quintao 22'; Sandro Lima 71'; Angenuku Viegas 81'; Palomito Ribeiro 90'

Estádio Municipal de Díli

=== Group B ===
Pos.	Club	W	D	L	GF	GA	GD	Pts
1	Assalam (Q)	2	0	0	3	1	2	6
2	Nagardjo	1	0	1	2	2	0	3
3	DIT FC	0	0	2	2	4	-2	0

18 January
18:00 UTC+9

DIT FC	1–2	Assalam F.C.
Elvis da Silva 43'; Martinho Lopes 13'	Report	Casimiro 34'

Estádio Municipal de Díli

25 January
19:30 UTC+9

DIT FC	1–2	Nagardjo
Kauda Afo Mah 55'	Report	Avarely A. E. Sueba 71'; Emmanuel Akeley 73'

Estádio Municipal de Díli

31 January
16:00 UTC+9

Assalam F.C.	1–0	Nagardjo
Augusto Da Costa 60'	Report

Estádio Municipal de Díli

=== Group C ===
Pos.	Club	W	D	L	GF	GA	GD	Pts
1	FC Porto Taibesse (Q)	2	1	0	9	2	7	7
2	Lica-Lica Lemorai	2	0	1	7	5	2	6
3	Coração FC	1	1	1	5	6	-1	4
4	FIEL	0	0	3	2	10	-8	0

23 January
18:00 UTC+9

Coração FC	1–1	FC Porto Taibesse
Hasan Ramos 12'	Report	Miguel Barbosa 45+3'

Estádio Municipal de Díli

24 January
16:00 UTC+9

FIEL FC	0–3	Lica-Lica Lemorai
	Report	Mario Panau 29' 90+3 [P]'; Valdo Correia 38'

Estádio Municipal de Díli

31 January
19:30 UTC+9

FIEL FC	1–2	Coração FC
Lourenco Ximenes 19'	Report	Miguel Barbosa 19'; Rofino Gama 81'

Estádio Municipal de Díli

1 February
16:00 UTC+9

Lica-Lica Lemorai	0–3	FC Porto Taibesse
	Report	Hasan Ramos 52'; Inocensius S. Ati 65'; Gaudencio Karen 68'

Estádio Municipal de Díli

6 February
19:30 UTC+9

Lica-Lica Lemorai	4–2	Coração FC
Mario De Jesus 22' 60'; Rivaldo Correia 29'; Jonas Conceicao 69'	Report	Lexi Atok 4'; Miguel Barbosa 17'

Kampo FFTL

6 February
19:30 UTC+9

FC Porto Taibesse	5–1	FIEL FC
Jardiel Piedade 8' 12' 40+3' 58' 84'	Report	Natalizio Sang 73'

Estádio Municipal de Díli

=== Group D ===
Pos.	Club	W	D	L	GF	GA	GD	Pts
1	Karketu Dili F.C. (Q)	2	0	0	11	2	9	6
2	AS Marca	1	0	1	2	3	-1	3
3	Santa Cruz F.C.	0	0	2	1	9	-8	0

24 January
19:30 UTC+9

Karketu Dili F.C.	3–1	AS Marca
Daniel Gayo 3'; Anizo Correia 75'; Yohanes Gusmao 90+5'	Report	Louis Anselmo 27'

Estádio Municipal de Díli

1 February
19:30 UTC+9

Santa Cruz F.C.	0–1	AS Marca FC
	Report	Carol Violito 40'

Estádio Municipal de Díli

8 February
19:00 UTC+9

Karketu Dili	8–1	Santa Cruz F.C.
Ola Olipio 4' 32'; Alexandre Corsino 30' 47' 55' 85'; Olegar Malik 58'; Daniel Gayo 44'	Report	Brocklyn Guterres 52'

Estádio Municipal de Díli

== Knockout stage ==
Semifinals
Emmanuel FC	1	1	2
FC Porto Taibesse	1	0	1
Assalam F.C.	1	2	3
Karketu Dili	1	3	4

Finals
Karketu Dili	0
Emmanuel FC	1

Semi-Final 1 Leg 1
14 February

Emmanuel FC	1–1	FC Porto Taibesse
Angenuku Viegas 73'	Report	Jardiel Poedade 89'

Estádio Municipal de Díli
Semi-Final 1 Leg 2
21 February

Emmanuel FC	1–0	FC Porto Taibesse
Angenuku Viegas 45+7'	Report

Estádio Municipal de Díli
Semi-Final 2 Leg 1
15 February

Assalam F.C.	1–1	Karketu Dili
Augusto Da Costa 30'	Report	Daniel Gayo 83'

Estádio Municipal de Díli
Semi-Final 2 Leg 2
22 & 23 February*

Assalam F.C.	1–2	Karketu Dili
Augusto Da Costa 13'	Report	Daniel Gayo 29' Ola Elipio 35'

Estádio Municipal de Díli
- The match on the 22nd was postponed in the 34th minute due to heavy rain, and was resumed on the 23rd of February.
Final
28 February

Emmanuel FC	1–0	Karketu Dili
Vincer Kojo Nortey 45+4'	Report

Estádio Municipal de Díli

== Awards and prize money ==
- Best Player: Nilton dos Reis Carvalho (Emmanuel FC)
- Best Goalkeeper: Alexandre Oscar Lima Quintão (Emmanuel FC)
- Top Scorer: Jardiel Piedade (FC Potro Taibessi)
- Best Young Player: Dramicio Augusto Morreira (Emmanuel FC)

Prize money of $35,000 USD was awarded to Emmanuel FC and $10,000 was awarded to Karketu Dili. Alongside this, each match throughout the tournament was allocated a $10,000 prize pool, with the following allocation:

- $6,500 for the winning team.
- $5,000 for each for a draw.
- $3,500 for the losing team.
