= Antonio Vega (footballer) =

Chilean footballer

Personal information
- Full name: José Antonio Vega Órdenes
- Date of birth: 2 November 1982 (age 43)
- Place of birth: Santiago, Chile
- Position: Midfielder

Senior career*
| Years | Team | Apps | (Gls) |
| 2003 | Cobreloa | | |
| 2004 | Corporación Ñuñoa | | |
| 2005–2006 | Palestino | | |
| 2007–2008 | Kuala Muda Naza | | |
| 2009 | Pro Duta | | |
| 2010 | BEC Tero Sasana | | |
| 2011 | Lopburi City | | |
| 2012–2013 | Ayutthaya FC | | |
| 2014 | Grakcu Looktabfah | | |
| 2015 | Ayutthaya FC | | |
| 2015–2016 | Tak City | | |
| 2016–2017 | Karketu Dili | | |
| 2018 | Boavista FC | | |
- * Club domestic league appearances and goals

José Antonio Vega Órdenes (born 2 November 1982), known as Antonio Vega, is a Chilean former professional footballer who played as a midfielder for clubs in Chile and Asia.

== Career ==
Born in Santiago, Chile, Vega played in his country of birth for Cobreloa, Corporación Municipal Ñuñoa and Palestino.

In 2007 he moved to Malaysia and joined Kuala Muda Naza, winning the 2007–08 Malaysia Premier League. In 2009 he played for Pro Duta in Indonesia.

Next he moved to Thailand and played for BEC Tero Sasana, Lopburi City, Ayutthaya FC, Grakcu Looktabfah and Tak City.

In 2017, as a player of Karketu Dili in Timor-Leste, he won both the Liga Futebol Amadora and the LFA Super Taça, with his compatriot Simón Elissetche as coach. In 2018, he joined Boavista FC.

== Personal life ==
Vega made his home in Indonesia, the country of birth of his wife.

== Honours ==
Kuala Muda Naza

- Malaysia Premier League: 2007–08

Ayutthaya

- Regional League Division 2: 2012
- Regional League Central-East Division: 2012

Karketu Dili

- LFA Primeira Divisão: 2017
- LFA Super Taça: 2017
