= Karketu Dili F.C. =

Timorese football club

Karketu Dili
- Full name: Karketu Dili Futebol Clube
- Nicknames: Matak Malirin (Green and Fresh)
- Founded: 2015; 11 years ago
- Ground: Estadiu Munisipal Díli
- Capacity: 5,000
- Chairman: Luis Oliveira
- Manager: Simon Elissetche
- League: Liga Futebol Timor-Leste
- 2026: 3rd
Home colours	Away colours

Karketu Dili Futebol Clube is a Timorese professional football club based in Dili, that competes in the Liga Futebol Timor-Leste, the top tier domestic league since its inception in 2016. The club are the current reigning champions of Timor-Leste, winning the league title in 2025. Karketu is also the most successful club in the nation, having won the Premeira Divisão league title a record four times, alongside one LFA Super Taça.

The club wins the Premeira Divisão in 2017, finishing with a total of 28 points, 3 above runners up AS Ponte Leste. They also finished runner-up in the competition in both the 2018 Premeira Divisão to champions Boavista. The club have won a record of four league titles and one LFA Super Taça.

== History ==
=== Team formation and first title (2016–2017) ===
In the inaugural season of the Liga Futebol Timor-Leste in 2016, Karketu Dili finished in 2nd place. Coached by manager Arcan Iurie, the club finished with an equal record to SLB Laulara, having both the same record and the same goal difference. They however lost the league title on goals scored, scoring 4 less goals during the season.

In 2017, the club signed up manager Simón Elissetche for the season, alongside three foreign players, including his compatriot Antonio Vega. In this season Karketu won their first Premeira Divisão title finishing with a total of 28 points, 3 above runners up Ponte Leste. They also managed to win the LFA Super Taça, beating Taça 12 de Novembro cup winners Atlético Ultramar 4–0. After the 2017 season, Simón Elissetche would leave the team to coach the Timor-Leste national team.

=== Inconsistent performances (2018–2020) ===
In 2018, following the departure of Simón Elissetche, Karketu resigned their old coach Arcan Iurie. Led by Ghanaian striker Daniel Adade and Timorese internationals Rufino Gama and Boavida Olegario, the team had a strong start to the season, only losing one of their first ten games. However, they then only achieved two points in their last four matches, finishing in second place behind champions Boavista TL.

In 2019, Karketu Dili hired former Persiba Balikpapan coach Haryadi as the team's new manager. Replacing Timorese manager Antonio Timotio after Karketu's slow start to the season, Hayardi stated that his main target is to bring the team to achieve better results. The team however struggled, finishing in fourth place, their lowest ever finish in the league.

In 2020, the Liga Futebol Timor-Leste was cancelled due to the COVID-19 pandemic. In its place, the league was replaced by the cup competition, the Copa FFTL. Karketu finished first in their five-team group, progressing to the knockout stages of the competition. They would however lose their quarter final match to Boavista TL.

=== Becoming multi-time Timorese champions (2021–2025) ===
In 2021, Karketu would win their second league title, being undefeated in a shortened six-game season and finishing three points ahead of Copa FFTL winners Lalenok United. The league would however not run in 2022, due to further difficulties following the COVID-19 pandemic.

In 2023, with the return of the league, Karketu would defend their previous victory to win their third league title. Heading into the final match of the season, Karketu was in second place, two points behind league leaders SLB Laulara. Both teams were scheduled to play against each other on the final match day, with Karketu requiring a win in order to win the title.

Prior to the match taking place however, SLB Laulara raised a dispute with the league due to five of their first team players being unavailable due to being called up to play for Timor-Leste U23 national team at the SEA Games. SLB requested that the game either be postponed to a later date or be allowed to sign replacement players to reinforce their team, however the club claimed to never receive a response to their request from the Liga Futebol Timor-Leste governing body. In retaliation, SLB Laulara decided to not show up to the final match of the season against Karketu Dili, leading to the match being forfeited and awarding Karketu Dili the title.

In 2024, the Liga Futebol Timor-Leste again did not run, with it being announced that it would be replaced again by the Copa FFTL. After the competition had been announced however multiple teams were reported as disagreeing with the FFTL's organisation of the tournament, noting that there was a lack of any formal consultation between clubs and the football federation taking place before the competition was announced. Karketu Dili initially showed support to the federation, expressing support in the cup, however later decided to not compete alongside the majority of Premier and Segunda division sides.

In 2025, led by manager Bernard Taye, Karketu won their fourth Primeira division title. The team lost only one match across the season and finished three points ahead of second-place finisher Emmanuel, despite Emmanuel ending the season undefeated.

== Players ==
=== Current squad ===
Below are a list of known players that competed for the team in the 2026 Liga Futebol Timor-Leste, from Transfermarkt

Note: Flags indicate national team as defined under FIFA eligibility rules; some limited exceptions apply. Players may hold more than one non-FIFA nationality.

No.	Pos.	Nation	Player
—	GK	TLS	Expedito Ferreira
—	GK	TLS	Tristan Oliveira
—	DF	TLS	António Martins
—	DF	TLS	Yohanes Gusmao
—	DF	TLS	Inigo Martins
—	DF	IDN	Rekshy Kurniawan
—	DF	TLS	Nobelito da Silva
—	DF	IDN	Barnabas Sobor
—	DF	TLS	Nelson Viegas (captain)
—	DF	TLS	Feliciano
—	MF	TLS	Natalino Costa
—	MF	BRA	Tafarel
—	MF	GHA	Mumin Mohammed

No.	Pos.	Nation	Player
—	MF	GHA	Daniel Gayo
—	MF	TLS	David Freitas
—	MF	TLS	Santiago da Costa
—	MF	TLS	Zenivio
—	FW	BRA	Carlinhos Souza
—	FW	BRA	Israel
—	FW	TLS	Alexandro Bakhito
—	FW	TLS	Angenucu Viegas
—	FW	TLS	Armando Bere
—	FW	TLS	Gaudencio Monteiro
—	FW	TLS	Fernando Junior

== Season by season record ==
Competitive records from RSSSF.

Season	Competition	Pld	W	D	L	GF	GA	GD	Pts	Position	Taça 12 de Novembro	LFA Super Taça
2016	Primeira Divisão	14	5	6	3	18	14	+4	21	2nd	3rd Round	
2017	Primeira Divisão	14	8	4	2	43	15	+28	28	1st	First Round	Winners
2018	Primeira Divisão	14	7	4	3	32	16	+16	25	2nd	Quarter Finals	
2019	Primeira Divisão	14	6	2	6	24	27	−3	20	4th	Round of 16	
2020	Copa FFTL	4	3	0	1	7	2	+5	9	QF		
2021	Primeira Divisão	6	4	2	0	6	2	+4	14	1st		
2023	Primeira Divisão	8	6	0	2	16	7	+9	18	1st		
2025	Primeira Divisão	9	6	2	1	18	2	+16	20	1st		

== Honours ==
=== League ===
Liga Futebol Amadora

- Champions (4): 2017, 2021, 2023, 2025
- Runners-up (2): 2016, 2018

=== Cup ===
LFA Super Taça

- Winners (1): 2017

Taça da Liga Timor-Leste

- Runners-Up: 2026

== Former coaches ==
- (Moldova) Arcan Iurie
- (Uzbekistan) Shavkat Juraev
- (Timor-Leste) Antonio Timotio
- (Chile) Simón Elissetche
- (Indonesia) Haryadi

== Former chairmen ==
- Elisio Oscar Vitor
- Jose Adilson Ribeiro 2022-2025
