= Alexandro Bakhito =

East Timorese footballer (born 2006)

Personal information
- Full name: Alexandro Bakhito Corsino Lemos
- Date of birth: 1 June 2006 (age 20)
- Place of birth: Dili, Timor-Leste
- Position: Forward

Team information
- Current team: Karketu Dili
- Number: 10

Senior career*
Years	Team	Apps	(Gls)
2023–2025	Sport Laulara e Benfica	18	(8)
2026–	Karketu Dili	1	(0)

International career^{‡}
2024	Timor-Leste U19		
2024–	Timor-Leste U23		
2024–	Timor-Leste	14	(2)
- * Club domestic league appearances and goals as of 4 October 2026 ‡ National team caps and goals as of 4 October 2026

Alexandro Bakhito Corsino Lemos (born 1 June 2006) is an East Timorese professional footballer who plays as a forward for Liga Futebol Timor-Leste Primeira Divisão club Karketu Dili.

== International career ==
Bakhito represented the youth national squads before transitioning into the senior international side. He notably scored for the Timor-Leste national under-19 team against Indonesia during the 2024 ASEAN U-19 Boys Championship at the Gelora Bung Tomo Stadium. He was also instrumental during the 2025 ASEAN U-23 Championship, securing a late equalizer in added time during an intense 4–4 group-stage draw against Myanmar.

In 2026, during the 2027 AFC Asian Cup qualification, Bakhito scored a senior international goal against the Maldives.

== Career statistics ==
=== Club ===
As of 4 October 2026

Club	Season	League			Cup		Continental		Other		Total	
Club	Season	Division	Apps	Goals	Apps	Goals	Apps	Goals	Apps	Goals	Apps	Goals
Sport Laulara e Benfica	2023	LFA Primeira Divisão	9	3	0	0	—		—		9	3
Sport Laulara e Benfica	2024	LFA Primeira Divisão	no leagues competing									
Sport Laulara e Benfica	2025	LFA Primeira Divisão	9	5	0	0	—		—		9	5
Sport Laulara e Benfica	Total		18	8	0	0	0	0	0	0	18	8
Karketu Dili	2026	LFA Primeira Divisão	1	0	0	0	—		—		1	0
Career total			19	8	0	0	0	0	0	0	19	8

=== International ===
As of 4 October 2026

National team	Year	Apps	Goals
Timor-Leste	2024	4	0
Timor-Leste	2025	6	0
Timor-Leste	2026	4	2
Total		14	2

==== International goals ====
Scores and results list Timor-Leste's goal tally first.

No.	Date	Venue	Opponent	Score	Result	Competition
1.	31 March 2026	National Football Stadium, Malé, Maldives	Maldives	1–1	1–2	2027 AFC Asian Cup qualification
2.	30 September 2026	Kai Tak Stadium, Kowloon, Hong Kong	Cambodia	2–1	2–2	2026 FIFA ASEAN Cup
