= 2018 LFA Super Taça =

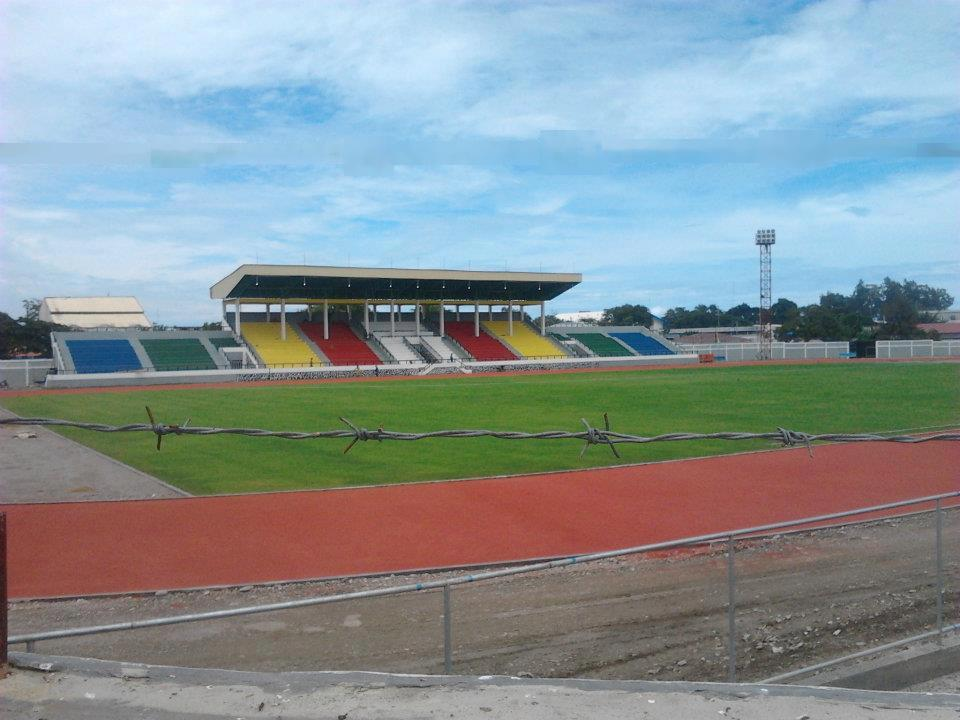
- The match was played at the National Stadium in Díli.
Boavista FC	Atlético Ultramar
(Dili District)	(Manatuto District)
2	0
- Date: 25 November 2018
- Venue: National Stadium (East Timor), Díli

The 2018 LFA Super Taça was the 3rd staging of the LFA Super Taça. A cup played in a single game between the two best teams in the country.

== The match ==
The match of this edition of LFA Super Taça was played on November 25, 2018 at the National Stadium (East Timor) in the city of Díli, in East Timor. The National Stadium has a maximum capacity of 5,000 spectators.

Participants are classified through two main competitions: Liga Futebol Amadora Primeira Divisão and Taça 12 de Novembro.

The cup was disputed by two teams: one classified through the 2018 Liga Futebol Amadora Primeira Divisão and the other through the 2018 Taça 12 de Novembro.

The Boavista FC team was champion of the 2018 Liga Futebol Amadora Primeira Divisão and Atlético Ultramar team was champion of the 2018 Taça 12 de Novembro. Thus, the two teams won the right to compete in the SuperTaça.

== Final ==
25 November 2018
Final 2018

(Dili District) Boavista FC	2–0	Atlético Ultramar (Manatuto District)
Henrique da Cruz 18'; Edit Savio 24'	Report

National Stadium (East Timor), Díli, East Timor
