= 2017 LFA Segunda Divisao Promotion Playoff =

Segunda Divisaun Promotion Playoff
- Season: 2017
- Promoted: Fitun Estudante, Lalenok United, FC Lero
- Matches: 11
- Goals: 34 (3.09 per match)
- Biggest home win: Lalenok United 6-1 LA Matebian (22 May 2017)
- Biggest away win: AS Lero 1-3 Liquica FC (16 May 2017)
- Highest scoring: Lalenok United 6-1 LA Matebian (22 May 2017)
- Longest winning run: 3 games, FC Lero
- Longest unbeaten run: 3 games, FC Lero
- Longest winless run: 2 games, União Tokodede
- Longest losing run: 2 games, União Tokodede
- All statistics correct as of 31 May 2017.

The 2017 LFA Segunda Divisao Promotion Playoff is the first season of the Liga Futebol Amadora Segunda Divisao Promotion Playoff. The tournament began on May 16 and finished on May 31.

All games are played at the Dili Municipal Stadium.

== Stadiums ==
- Primary venues used in the 2017 LFA Segunda Divisao Promotion Playoff:

Dili
Municipal Stadium
Capacity: 5,000
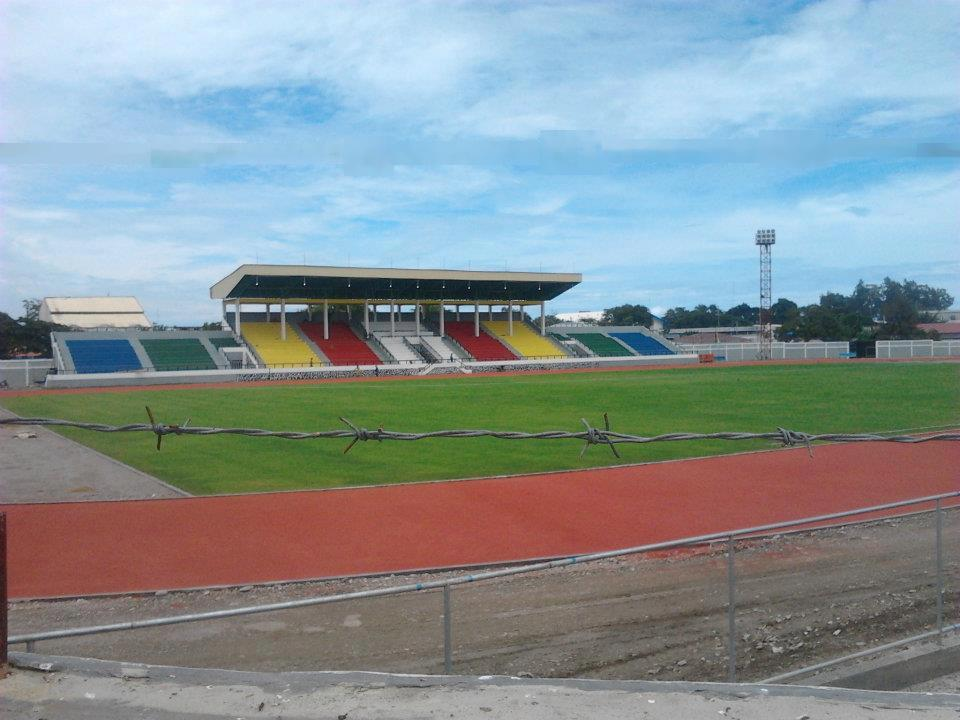

== Teams ==
12 clubs entered a knock-out tournament to determine 3 clubs to be promoted to 2018 Segunda Divisao.

=== Locations ===
Locations of the 2017 LFA Segunda Divisao Promotion Playoff teams.

Club	City / Area
FC Aimo	Dili
Emmanuel FC	Dili
Fitun Estudante	Dili
Irmãos Unidos	(Lautém District) Luro
Karau Fuik	Viqueque
Lalenok United	Dili
LA Matebian	Baucau
FC Leopa	Liquica
AS Lero	Lautem
FC Lero	Lautem
Liquica FC	(Liquiçá District) Liquiçá
União Tokodede	(Liquiçá District) Maubara

== First round ==
This round match held between 16 and 22 May 2017.

Team 1	Score	Team 2
AS Lero	1-3	Liquica FC
FC Lero	3-1	FC Aimo
União Tokodede	3-0	Karau Fuik
Fitun Estudante	2-1	Emmanuel FC
Irmãos Unidos	2-0 (aet)	FC Leopa
Lalenok United	6-1	LA Matebian

16 May 2017
15:30

AS Lero	1–3	Liquica FC
Carcolito Fernandes 38'	Report	Xisto da Costa 14'; Martinho da Costa 60'; Salvador Ag 87'

Municipal Stadium, Dili

17 May 2017
15:30

FC Lero	3–1	FC Aimo
Alexandrinho 31', 59', 61'	Report	Pedro Borges 55'

Municipal Stadium, Dili

18 May 2017
15:30

União Tokodede	3–0	Karau Fuik
Angelino Oliveira 3'; Dionisio Gama 20'; João P. Pereira 25'	Report

Municipal Stadium, Dili

19 May 2017
15:30

Fitun Estudante	2–1	Emmanuel FC
Sabino Pereira 22', 73'	Report	Mario Guterres 25' (o.g.)

Municipal Stadium, Dili

21 May 2017
15:30

Irmãos Unidos	2–0 (aet)	FC Leopa
Paulo Soares 99'; Florindo Soares 105'	Report

Municipal Stadium, Dili

22 May 2017
15:30

Lalenok United	6–1	LA Matebian
Elias Ximenes 4', 67'; Jonas Concecão 10', 27'; Mateus da Silva 18'; Adrian Ramadani 44'	Report	Deonisio Silva 86' (pen.)

Municipal Stadium, Dili

== Second round ==
This round match held between 23 and 24 May 2017. União Tokodede and Lalenok United received a bye.

Team 1	Score	Team 2
Liquica FC	1-2	FC Lero
Fitun Estudante	2-0	Irmãos Unidos

23 May 2017
15:30

Liquica FC	1–2	FC Lero
Sisto da Costa 88'	Report	Alexandrinho 36'; Fabiano Madeira 68' (pen.)

Municipal Stadium, Dili

24 May 2017
15:30

Fitun Estudante	2–0	Irmãos Unidos
Nelson Silva 64'; Atanazio Cabral 90+2'	Report

Municipal Stadium, Dili

== Semifinals ==
The semifinals held between 26 and 28 May 2017.

Team 1	Score	Team 2
União Tokodede	1-2	FC Lero
Lalenok United	1-0	Fitun Estudante

26 May 2017
15:30

União Tokodede	1–2	FC Lero
João Paul 67'	Report	Agustino Jeronimo 43'; Amandio Pinto 85'

Municipal Stadium, Dili

FC Lero promoted.

28 May 2017
16:00

Lalenok United	1–0	Fitun Estudante
Iman Hambardo 22'	Report

Municipal Stadium, Dili

Lalenok United promoted.

== Play-off ==
The final held on 31 May 2017 in Municipal Stadium.

Team 1	Score	Team 2
Fitun Estudante	2-0	União Tokodede

31 May 2017
16:00

Fitun Estudante	2–0	União Tokodede
Alito da Cruz 39'; Joel Baptista 48'	Report

Municipal Stadium, Dili

Fitun Estudante promoted.

== See also ==
- 2017 LFA Primeira
- 2017 LFA Segunda
- 2017 Taça 12 de Novembro
- 2017 LFA Super Taça
