= 2026 Liga Futebol Timor-Leste =

The 2026 Liga Futebol Timor-Leste is the fourth season under the title of the Liga Futebol Timor-Leste, and the eleventh season overall. The winner of the highest division is set to gain a qualification for the AFC Challenge League.

The competition consists of two main divisions, the Primeira Divisão and Segunda Divisão, representing the top two divisions in the nation. The tournament was preceded by the preseason cup tournament the Taça da Liga Timor-Leste.

== Primeira Divisão ==
Liga Futebol Timor-Leste Primeira Divisaun
- Season: 2026
- Dates: 21 May 2026 – 22 July 2026
- Champions: Benfica Laulara
- Relegated: AS Marca; Aitana
- AFC Challenge League: Benfica Laulara
- Matches: 45
- Goals: 120 (2.67 per match)
- Top goalscorer: Ítalo Pimentel (7 goals)

Ten teams compete in the league – eight returning teams from the previous season and two teams promoted from the Segunda Divisão.

Karketu Dili were the defending champions, having won the competition in 2025.

=== League table ===
Pos	Team	Pld	W	D	L	GF	GA	GD	Pts	Qualification or relegation
1	Benfica Laulara (Q)	9	8	1	0	22	2	+20	25	Qualification for the AFC Challenge League
2	Santa Cruz	9	7	2	0	19	4	+15	23	
3	Karketu Dili	9	5	2	2	14	10	+4	17	
4	DIT	9	4	0	5	14	12	+2	12	
5	Emmanuel	9	3	2	4	10	13	−3	11	
6	Porto Taibessi	9	2	4	3	8	10	−2	10	
7	Coração	9	3	1	5	11	20	−9	10	
8	Assalam	9	2	3	4	9	16	−7	9	
9	AS Marca (R)	9	0	4	5	7	19	−12	4	Relegation to LFA Segunda Divisão
10	Aitana (R)	9	0	3	6	6	14	−8	3	Relegation to LFA Segunda Divisão

Source: RSSSF, Facebook LFA
Rules for classification: 1) Points; 2) Goal difference; 3) Goals scored; 4) Head-to-head result; 5) Head-to-head goal difference; 6) Head-to-head goals scored.
(Q) Qualified for the phase indicated; (R) Relegated

== Segunda Divisão ==
Liga Futebol Timor-Leste Segunda Divisaun
- Season: 2026
- Dates: 26 May – 1 July 2026
- Champions: AD Santo Antonio
- Promoted: AD Santo Antonio; Hibers Dili
- Relegated: Vila Atauro; Académica

Ten teams compete in the league – five returning teams from the previous season and five teams promoted from the 2025–26 Liga Futebol Timor-Leste Segunda Divisão Qualifiers. Teams are split into two groups of five for the competition.

For the teams AD St. Antonio, Vila Atauro, Hibers Dili and Weasel FC, this competition is their first ever season in the Liga Futebol Timor-Leste.

=== League Table ===
==== Group A ====
Pos	Team	Pld	W	D	L	GF	GA	GD	Pts	Qualification or relegation
1	AD Santo Antonio (P, C)	4	4	0	0	15	2	+13	12	Promotion to LFTL Primeira Divisaun and qualification to the league final
2	FIEL	4	2	1	1	5	10	−5	7	
3	Nagarjo	4	1	2	1	6	5	+1	5	
4	Ponta Leste	4	0	2	2	3	8	−5	2	
5	Vila Atauro (R)	4	0	1	3	2	6	−4	1	Relegation to LFTL Terseira Divisaun

Source: RSSSF
Rules for classification: 1) Points; 2) Goal difference; 3) Goals scored; 4) Head-to-head result; 5) Head-to-head goal difference; 6) Head-to-head goals scored.
(C) Champions; (P) Promoted; (R) Relegated

==== Group B ====
Pos	Team	Pld	W	D	L	GF	GA	GD	Pts	Qualification or relegation
1	Hibers Dili (P)	4	3	1	0	15	4	+11	10	Promotion to LFTL Primeira Divisaun and qualification to the league final
2	Lica-Lica Lemorai	4	1	2	1	7	7	0	5	
3	AC Mamura	4	1	2	1	6	8	−2	5	
4	Weasel	4	1	1	2	3	9	−6	4	
5	Académica (R)	4	1	0	3	5	8	−3	3	Relegation to LFTL Terseira Divisaun

Source: RSSSF
Rules for classification: 1) Points; 2) Goal difference; 3) Goals scored; 4) Head-to-head result; 5) Head-to-head goal difference; 6) Head-to-head goals scored.
(P) Promoted; (R) Relegated

==== Final ====
1 July 2026

AD Santo Antonio	0–0	Hibers Dili
	Report
Penalties
	4–2

National Stadium, Dili
