= 2019 LFA Super Taça =

Lalenok United	SLB Laulara
(Dili District)	(Aileu District)
3	1
- Date: 19 October 2019
- Venue: Estádio Café Ermera, Ermera

The 2019 LFA Super Taça is the 4th staging of the LFA Super Taça. A cup played in a single game between the two best teams in the country.

Participants are classified through two main competitions: Liga Futebol Amadora Primeira Divisão and Taça 12 de Novembro.

The match of this edition of ST was played on October 18, 2019 at the Estádio Café Ermera in the city of Ermera, in East Timor.

== Teams ==
The cup was disputed by two teams: one classified through the 2019 Liga Futebol Amadora Primeira Divisão and the other through the 2019 Taça 12 de Novembro.

The Lalenok United team was champion of the two qualifying competitions, so the SLB Laulara team, which was runner-up in the Taça 12 de Novembro, was given the right to compete in the Super Taça.

== Match ==
19 October 2019
Final 2019

(Dili District) Lalenok United	3–1	SLB Laulara (Aileu District)
Yohanes Gusmão 16', 28'; Santiago da Costa 54'	Report	Job Mark Freitas 62'

Estádio Café Ermera, Ermera
