= Eladio Rojas (footballer, born 1971) =

Chilean footballer and manager

Personal information
- Full name: Eladio Antonio Rojas Reyes
- Date of birth: 30 June 1971 (age 55)
- Place of birth: Santiago, Chile
- Position: Midfielder

Youth career
- Universidad de Chile

Senior career*
Years	Team	Apps	(Gls)
1990–1992	Universidad de Chile	3	(0)
1993	Santiago Morning	–	(–)
1994–1995	Colchagua	47	(7)
1996–1998	Rangers	90	(28)
1998–1999	LDU Quito	4	(1)
1999	Santiago Morning	29	(9)
2000	Unión Española	19	(1)
2001–2002	Rangers	52	(4)
2003	Deportes Temuco	12	(1)
2004	Persiter Ternate	–	(–)
2005–2006	Persikad Depok	–	(–)
2007–2008	Deportes Copiapó	31	(2)
Total		287	(53)

Managerial career
- Arsenal Academy
- Boca Juniors Soccer School
- 2017: Pro Duta F.C.
- 2018: Boavista Timor-Leste
- * Club domestic league appearances and goals

Eladio Antonio Rojas Reyes (born 30 June 1971) is a Chilean former professional footballer who played as a midfielder for clubs in Chile, Ecuador and Indonesia.

== Playing career ==
A product of Universidad de Chile youth system, then Rojas played for Santiago Morning in the Chilean Tercera División and for both Colchagua and Rangers de Talca in the Primera B until 1997. Along with Rangers, he won the 1997 Apertura of the Primera B and got promotion to the top division for the 1998 season.

On second half 1998, he moved to Ecuador and joined Liga de Quito, where he coincided with the well-known Chilean coach Manuel Pellegrini in 1999. He also coincided with the Ecuador international Byron Tenorio, with whom met in Unión Española later.

In 1999 he returned to Chile and played for Santiago Morning, Unión Española, Rangers and Deportes Temuco until 2003. In 2004 he went to Indonesia and played for Persiter Ternate and Persikad Depok in the Divisi Satu until 2006.

== Coaching career ==
Following his retirement, Rojas has worked as coach of football academies of both Arsenal and Boca Juniors based in Indonesia. As an anecdote, he served as host for Diego Maradona when he visited the country.

He also had an experience as head coach of Boavista Timor-Leste in 2018, with his compatriot Antonio Vega as a player.

In addition, he works as coach and teller for the development of Indonesian women's football by training sessions and management coaching.

== Honours ==
Rangers

- Primera B de Chile: 1997 Apertura

LDU Quito

- Ecuadorian Serie A: 1998
