= Silveiro Garcia =

East Timorese footballer (born 1994)

Personal information
- Full name: Silveiro Da Rocha Da Silva Garcia
- Date of birth: 2 April 1994 (age 32)
- Place of birth: Manatuto, East Timor, Indonesia
- Height: 1.84 m (6 ft 1/2 in)
- Position: Forward

Team information
- Current team: AS Ponta Leste

Senior career*
Years	Team	Apps	(Gls)
2015–	AS Ponta Leste	14	(8)

International career^{‡}
2016–	Timor-Leste	9	(2)
- * Club domestic league appearances and goals as of 1 September 2018 ‡ National team caps and goals as of 5 November 2016

Silveiro Garcia (born 2 April 1994) is an East Timorese football player who currently plays as a forward for AS Ponta Leste in Liga Futebol Amadora and he also play for Timor-Leste national football team.

== International career ==
Garcia made his senior international debut in a 1–2 loss against Chinese Taipei in a 2019 AFC Asian Cup qualification on 11 October 2016.

=== International goals ===
Scores and results list East Timor's goal tally first.

No	Date	Venue	Opponent	Score	Result	Competition
1.	5 December 2017	Taipei Municipal Stadium, Taipei, Taiwan	Philippines	1–0	1–0	2017 CTFA International Tournament
2.	1 September 2018	Kuala Lumpur Stadium, Kuala Lumpur, Malaysia	Brunei	3–1	3–1	2018 AFF Championship qualification

== Honours ==
AS Ponta Leste

- Taça 12 de Novembro Champions : 2016
- LFA Super Taça Champions : 2016
