= Nelson Viegas =

Timorese footballer (born 1999)

Personal information
- Full name: Nelson Sarmento Viegas
- Date of birth: 24 December 1999 (age 26)
- Place of birth: Atambua, Indonesia
- Height: 1.72 m (5 ft 8 in)
- Position: Defender

Team information
- Current team: Karketu Dili
- Number: 22

Youth career
- Teouma Academy

Senior career*
Years	Team	Apps	(Gls)
2015	Académica		
2016	Karketu Dili		
2017	Carsae		
2018–2020	Boavista TL		
2020–2022	Karketu Dili		
2022–2024	Greenvale United		
2024–2025	Emmanuel		
2026–	Karketu Dili		

International career^{‡}
2013	Timor-Leste U14	4	(4)
2015–2018	Timor-Leste U19	13	(3)
2016–	Timor-Leste	29	(1)
- * Club domestic league appearances and goals ‡ National team caps and goals as of 31 March 2026

Nelson Sarmento Viegas (born 24 December 1999) is a footballer who plays as a defender for Primeira Divisão club Karketu Dili. Born in Indonesia, he represents the Timor-Leste at international level.

In November 2022, Viegas moved to Greenvale United in Australia.

== International career ==
Viegas scored his first international goal against Cambodia on 21 October 2016.

=== International goals ===
#	Date	Venue	Opponent	Score	Result	Competition
1.	21 October 2016	Olympic Stadium, Phnom Penh, Cambodia	Cambodia	2–2	2–3	2016 AFF Championship qualification
