= Aderito Fernandes =

East Timorese footballer

Aderito
Personal information
- Full name: Aderito Raul Fernandes
- Date of birth: 15 May 1997 (age 29)
- Place of birth: Atambua, Indonesia
- Height: 1.87 m (6 ft 1 1/2 in)
- Position: Goalkeeper

Team information
- Current team: Boavista FC Timor Leste

Senior career*
Years	Team	Apps	(Gls)
2014–2015	Balibo Sporting		
2015–2019	AS Ponta Leste		
2020-	Boavista FC Timor Leste		

International career^{‡}
2013	Timor-Leste futsal	0	(0)
2015–2016	Timor-Leste U-19	6	(0)
2015–2021	Timor-Leste	14	(0)
- * Club domestic league appearances and goals ‡ National team caps and goals as of 14 December 2021

Aderito Raul Fernandes (born 15 May 1997), simply known as Aderito, is a football player who currently plays as a goalkeeper for Boavista FC Timor-Leste and the Timor-Leste national football team.

== International career ==
Aderito made his senior international debut in an 8-0 loss to the UAE in the 2018 FIFA World Cup qualification phase on 12 November 2015.
