= 2016 LFA Super Taça =

SLB Laulara	AS Ponta Leste
(Aileu District)	(Dili District)
1	2
- Date: 25 November 2016
- Venue: Malibaca Estádio, Maliana

The 2016 LFA Super Taça is the first staging of the LFA Super Taça. A cup played in a single game between the two best teams in the country.

Participants are classified through two main competitions: Liga Futebol Amadora Primeira Divisão and Taça 12 de Novembro.

The match of this edition of ST was played on November 25, 2016 at the Malibaca Estádio in the city of Maliana, in East Timor.

== Teams ==
The cup was disputed by two teams: one classified through the 2016 Liga Futebol Amadora Primeira Divisão and the other through the 2016 Taça 12 de Novembro.

The SLB Laulara team was champion of the 2016 Liga Futebol Amadora Primeira Divisão and AS Ponta Leste team was champion of the 2016 Taça 12 de Novembro. Thus, the two teams won the right to compete in the SuperTaça.

== Final ==
25 November 2016
Final 2016

(Aileu District) SLB Laulara	1–2	AS Ponta Leste (Dili District)
	Report

Malibaca Estádio, Maliana, East Timor
