= Jhon Frith =

East Timorese footballer

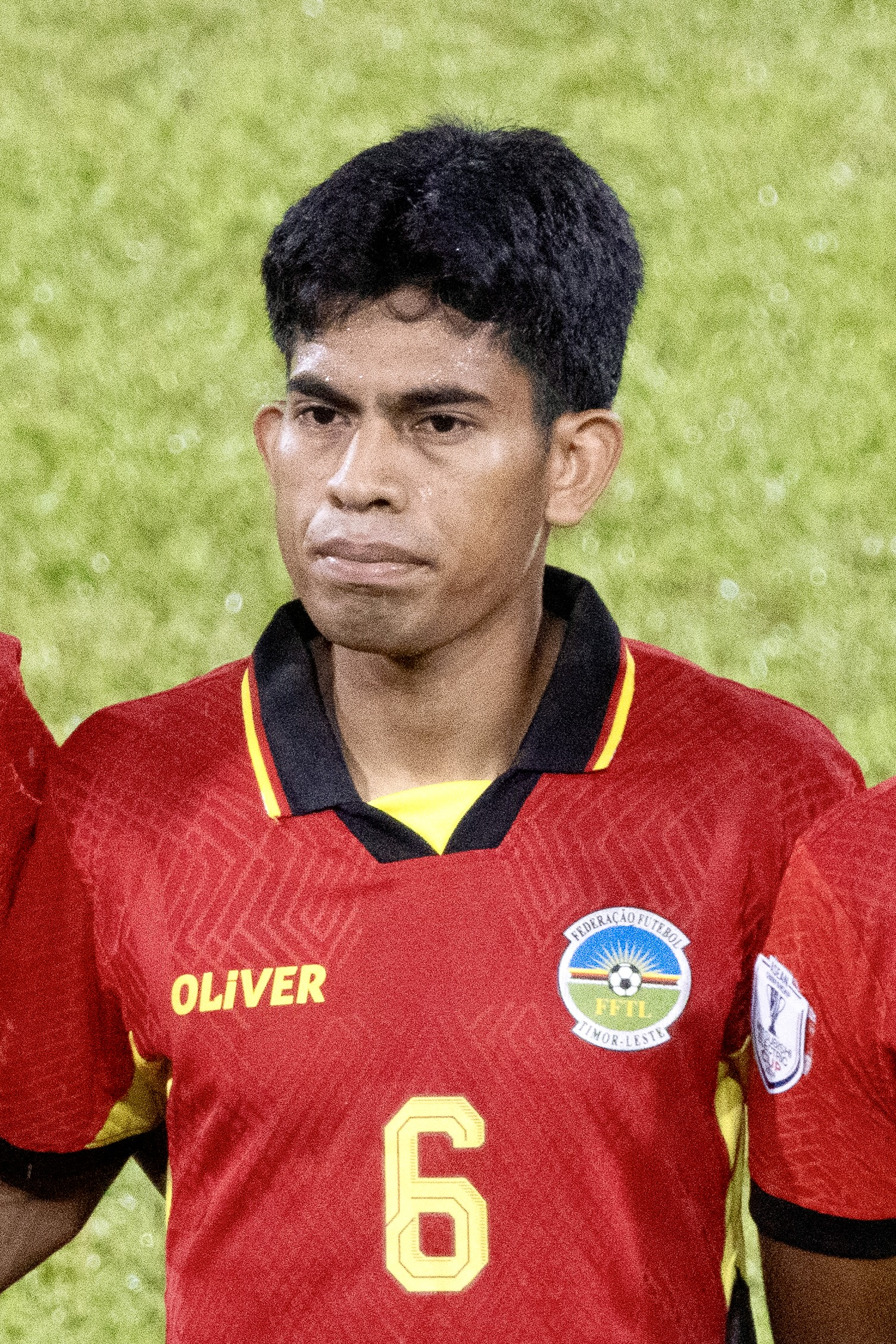
- Jhon with Timor-Leste in 2024

Personal information
- Full name: Jhon Frith Ornai Liu de Oliveira
- Date of birth: 17 July 2002 (age 24)
- Place of birth: Dili, Timor-Leste
- Height: 1.65 m (5 ft 5 in)
- Position: Midfielder

Team information
- Current team: ISI Dangkor Senchey
- Number: 6

Youth career
- SLB Laulara

Senior career*
Years	Team	Apps	(Gls)
2017–2019	Sport Laulara e Benfica		
2020	Boavista		
2021–2022	Lalenok United		
2023–2026	ISI Dangkor Senchey	39	(8)

International career^{‡}
2018	Timor-Leste U-16	4	(2)
2018–2019	Timor-Leste U-19	6	(0)
2021–	Timor-Leste U-23	12	(1)
2021–	Timor-Leste	11	(2)
- * Club domestic league appearances and goals as of 8 June 2026 ‡ National team caps and goals as of 1 June 2022

Jhon Frith Ornai Liu de Oliveira (born 17 July 2002) is a Timorese professional footballer who plays as a midfielder for Cambodian Premier League club ISI Dangkor Senchey.

== Club career ==
=== ISI Dangkor Senchey ===
On 17 June 2023, Jhon joined Cambodian Premier League side, ISI Dangkor Senchey. He make his official debut in the league match against Angkor Tiger on 6 August 2023. He would then scored his first debut goal against Svay Rieng on 26 August 2023.

On 24 January 2024, Jhon scored a hat-trick against Angkor Tiger in a 7–1 thrashing victory in which he became the first player from Timor-Leste to score a hat-trick in the league.

== International career ==
On 5 December 2021 he made his debut for the Timor-Leste national team in the opening group A match of the 2020 AFF Championship against Thailand.

== International goals ==
No	Date	Venue	Opponent	Score	Result	Competition
1.	28 May 2022	Grand Hamad Stadium, Doha, Qatar	Nepal	1–0	2–2	Friendly
2.	5 November 2022	Track & Field Sports Complex, Bandar Seri Begawan, Brunei	Brunei	2–3	2–6	2022 AFF Championship qualification
