= Iurie Arcan =

Moldovan football manager

Personal information
- Full name: Iurie Anatolievici Arcan
- Date of birth: 15 November 1964 (age 61)
- Place of birth: Chișinău, Moldovan SSR, USSR
- Height: 1.74 m (5 ft 8 1/2 in)
- Position: Midfielder

Senior career*
Years	Team	Apps	(Gls)
1983–1985	Nistru Chişinău	62	(2)
1986	Dinamo Brest	25	(2)
1987	Nistru Chişinău	8	(0)
1987–1988	Zaria Bălți	20	(3)
1989–1990	Tighina Bender	19	(1)
1990–1992	Czuwaj Przemyśl		
1992–1994	Bugeac Comrat	68	(4)
1995–1996	Codru Călăraşi	35	(4)

Managerial career
- 1999–2004: Persita Tangerang
- 2005–2006: Persija Jakarta
- 2006–2007: Persib Bandung
- 2007–2008: Persik Kediri
- 2008–2009: Persebaya Surabaya
- 2010–2011: Semen Padang
- 2013–2014: Persepam MU
- 2014–2016: Pusamania Borneo
- 2016–2017: Karketu Dili
- 2017–2019: Perseman Manokwari
- * Club domestic league appearances and goals

Iurie Anatolievici Arcan (born 15 November 1964) is a Moldovan football manager and former player, who managed Karketu Dili in 2016. He holds a UEFA Pro license.

== Managerial career ==
Upon moving to Indonesia, Iurie became the coach of Persija Jakarta, where he would stay until 2006. Thereafter, he took a job as manager of Persib Bandung, Persik Kediri, Persebaya Surabaya, and Persita Tangerang.

In 2014, he became the head coach for the newly promoted Pusamania Borneo.

In 2016, he signed for Karketu Dili.

== Personal life ==
He converted to Islam after marrying an Indonesian woman from Bandung.
