= Osvaldo Belo =

East Timorese footballer

Personal information
- Full name: Osvaldo Lucas Baptista Belo
- Date of birth: 18 October 2000 (age 26)
- Place of birth: Bairro Pite, East Timor
- Position: Midfielder

Team information
- Current team: Karketu Dili

Senior career*
Years	Team	Apps	(Gls)
2016–	Karketu Dili		

International career^{‡}
2017–	Timor-Leste	8	(0)
- * Club domestic league appearances and goals ‡ National team caps and goals as of 20 May 2020

Osvaldo Lucas Baptista Belo (born 18 October 2000) is an East Timorese footballer who plays as a midfielder for Karketu Dili and the Timor-Leste national football team.

== Career ==
=== International ===
Belo made his senior international debut on 3 December 2017 in a 2-1 friendly defeat to Laos.
