= Filomeno Junior =

East Timorese footballer

Personal information
- Full name: Filomeno Junior da Costa
- Date of birth: 21 June 1998 (age 28)
- Place of birth: Dili, Indonesia
- Height: 1.75 m (5 ft 9 in)
- Position: Midfielder

Team information
- Current team: SLB Laulara

Senior career*
Years	Team	Apps	(Gls)
2017–2023	SLB Laulara		
2023	Benfica de Macau	14	(0)
2024–	SLB Laulara		

International career^{‡}
2018–	Timor-Leste	29	(0)
- * Club domestic league appearances and goals ‡ National team caps and goals as of 31 March 2026

Filomeno Junior da Costa (born 21 June 1998), simply known as Filomeno, is a Timorese footballer who plays as a midfielder for SLB Laulara and the Timor-Leste national team.

== Club career ==
=== SLB Laulara ===
Filomeno played domestic football for SLB Laulara of the Liga Futebol Amadora for which he served as captain. In January 2022, the player expressed an interested in playing in neighboring Indonesia's Liga 1, particularly for Persija Jakarta.

=== Benfica de Macau ===
In February 2023, Filomeno joined Benfica de Macau of Macau's Liga de Elite. He was joined at the club by fellow Timorese international João Pedro da Silva Freitas. In a January 2023 interview, national teammate Jhon Frith identified both players as two of their nation's top footballers.

== International career ==
Filomeno represented Timor-Leste at the youth level, beginning with the under-14 level. In 2013 he scored against Myanmar in AFC U-14 Championship qualification. He made his senior international debut on 12 October 2018 in a friendly against Cambodia. In January 2022, he scored an own goal in a 1–4 friendly against Indonesia in what head coach Fábio Magrão called an otherwise satisfactory performance by the young players. Also in 2022, he captained the national under-23 team for the 2021 SEA Games.

In December 2024, Filomeno was named in Timor-Leste's 26-man squad for the 2024 ASEAN Championship.

=== International career statistics ===
As of match played 31 March 2026

Timor-Leste national team
Year	Apps	Goals
2018	7	0
2019	2	0
2020	0	0
2021	4	0
2022	4	0
2023	2	0
2024	5	0
2025	4	0
2026	1	0
Total	29	0
