= Football in Timor-Leste =

- Country: Timor-Leste
- Governing body: Federação de Futebol de Timor-Leste
- National teams: men's national team; men's futsal team

International competitions
- AFC Challenge League; FIFA World Cup; FIFA Futsal World Cup; Asian Cup; AFC Futsal Asian Cup; AFC Futsal Club Championship; ASEAN Club Championship; AFF Futsal Championship; AFF Futsal Club Championship

The sport of football in the country of Timor-Leste is run by the Federação de Futebol de Timor-Leste. The association administers the national football team as well as the former national league system the Super Liga. The current top league competition is the Liga Futebol Amadora, containing 21 teams in total. This consists of a two division system, with the Primeira Divisaun as the top division in the nation followed by the Segunda Divisaun. The current annual national cup competition is the Taça 12 de Novembro. Association football (soccer) is the most popular sport in the country.

== Football stadiums ==
Stadium	Capacity	City	Image
National Stadium	5,000	Dili	

== Attendances ==
The average attendance per top-flight football league season and the club with the highest average attendance:

Season	League average	Best club	Best club average
2025	542	Karketu Dili	1,247

Source: League page on Wikipedia

== See also ==
- Lists of stadiums
