= Ricky Nídio Alves =

East Timorese footballer

Personal information
- Full name: Nidio Ricardo Ferreira Alves
- Date of birth: 17 June 1994 (age 32)
- Place of birth: Dili, East Timor, Indonesia
- Height: 1.73 m (5 ft 8 in)
- Position: Defender

Team information
- Current team: SLB Laulara

Senior career*
Years	Team	Apps	(Gls)
2016–	SLB Laulara		

International career^{‡}
2009–2010	Timor-Leste U-16	9	(4)
2016–2018	Timor-Leste	10	(0)
- * Club domestic league appearances and goals ‡ National team caps and goals as of 1 January 2025

Nidio Ricardo Ferreira Alves (born 17 June, 1994), who is known as Ricky Nídio Alves, is a football player who currently plays for Timor-Leste national football team as a defender.

== International career ==
Ricky made his senior international debut in a 2–0 loss against Cambodia national football team in the friendly match on 29 May 2016.
