= LFA Super Taça =

- Founded: 2016; 10 years ago
- Region: Timor Leste
- Teams: 2
- Current champions: Lalenok United
- Most championships: Ponta Leste; Karketu Dili; Boavista; Lalenok United (1 title each)
- Broadcaster: ETO TV
- 2019 LFA Super Taça

The LFA Super Taça or the LFA Super Cup is an East Timorese football championship contested by the winners of Liga Futebol Timor-Leste and the Taça 12 de Novembro.

In the event that a team wins both Liga Futebol Timor-Leste Primeira Divisão and the Taça 12 de Novembro, the runners up of the Taça 12 de Novembro will play against the winner of Liga Futebol Amadora.

== Finals by year ==
=== 2016 ===
25 November 2016 Final 2016	(Aileu District) SLB Laulara	1–2	AS Ponta Leste (Dili District)	Maliana, (Timor-Leste) East Timor.
		Report		Stadium: Malibaca Estádio, Maliana.

=== 2017 ===
18 November 2017 Final 2017	(Dili District) Karketu Dili	4–0	Atlético Ultramar (Manatuto District)	Baucau, (Timor-Leste) East Timor
	Oligario Boavida 45, 48; Alan Leandro 55 (pen); Henrique Conceição 72.	Report		Stadium: Estádio Municipal, Baucau

=== 2018 ===
25 November 2018 Final 2018	(Dili District) Boavista FC	2–0	Atlético Ultramar (Manatuto District)	Díli, (Timor-Leste) East Timor
	Henrique da Cruz 18, Edit Savio 24..	Report		Stadium: Estádio Municipal, Díli

=== 2019 ===
19 October 2019 Final 2019	(Dili District) Lalenok United	3–1	SLB Laulara (Aileu District)	Díli, (Timor-Leste) East Timor
	Yohanes Gusmão 16, 28, Santiago da Costa 54	Report	Job Mark Freitas 62	Stadium: Estádio Café Ermera, Ermera

=== 2020 ===
In 2020, the LFA Super Taça match was not played, because in addition to the COVID-19 pandemic, the Lalenok United team was again champion of the two competitions that would give place in the LFA Super Taça.

== Participating Clubs ==
Year	Venues	Champion	Winner of	Runner-up	Winner of	Score
2016	Malibaca Stadium, Maliana	Ponta Leste	2016 Taça 12 de Novembro	SL Benfica	2016 Liga Futebol Amadora	2–1
2017	Baucau Municipal Stadium, Baucau	Karketu Dili	2017 Liga Futebol Amadora	Atlético Ultramar	2017 Taça 12 de Novembro	4–0
2018		Boavista	2018 Liga Futebol Amadora	Atlético Ultramar	2018 Taça 12 de Novembro	2-0
2019		Lalenok	Both LFA and Taça 12 Cup	SL Benfica	Runners up Taça 12 de Novembro	3-1

== Titles by team in Super Taça ==
Team	Winner	Runner-up	Years won	Years runner-up
Ponta Leste	1	-	2016	-
Karketu Dili	1	-	2017	-
Boavista	1	-	2018	-
Lalenok	1	-	2019	-
SL Benfica	-	2	-	2016, 2019
Atlético Ultramar	-	2	-	2017, 2018

== See also ==
- Football in East Timor
