= Francisco Jerónimo =

East Timorese teacher and politician

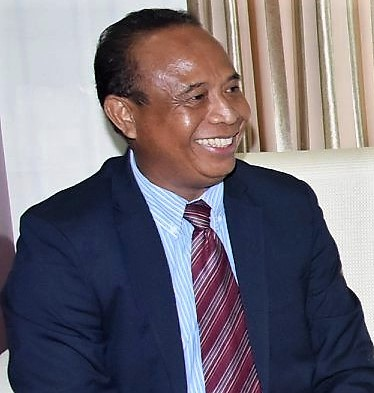
- Jerónimo in 2020

Minister of Parliamentary Affairs and Social Communication
- In office 5 May 2020 – 1 July 2023
- Prime Minister: Taur Matan Ruak
- Preceded by: Fidelis Leite Magalhães
- Succeeded by: Office abolished

Member of the National Parliament
- In office 2001–2012

Personal details
- Born: 18 April 1963 (age 63): Uatucarbau, Portuguese Timor; (now Timor-Leste)
- Party: Fretilin
- Profession: Teacher

Francisco Martins da Costa Pereira Jerónimo (born 18 April 1963) is an East Timorese teacher and politician, and a member of the Fretilin political party.

From May 2020 to July 2023, he was the Minister of Parliamentary Affairs and Social Communication, serving in the VIII Constitutional Government of Timor-Leste led by Prime Minister Taur Matan Ruak.

Previously, he was a Member of the National Parliament of Timor-Leste.

== Early life and career ==
Jerónimo was born in Uatucarbau, an administrative post in Viqueque Municipality, Portuguese Timor (now Timor-Leste). He has a degree in education and is a teacher by profession.

== Political career ==
In 2001, Jerónimo was elected from 13th place on Fretilin's list of candidates to the Constituent Assembly of Timor-Leste, from which the National Parliament emerged in 2002.

In the Constituent Assembly, Jerónimo spoke out against including a definition of the age group of children within the national constitution, and argued that it be specified in legislation. The definition was not included in the constitution. In the National Parliament, Jerónimo was Vice President of the Committee for the Eradication of Poverty, Rural and Regional Development and Gender Equality (Committee E).

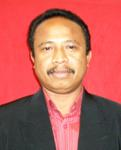
Jerónimo in 2007

In the 2007 Parliamentary election, Jerónimo was re-elected from 21st place on the FRETILIN list. During the subsequent legislative period, he was a member of the Committee for Health, Education and Culture (Committee F). In the 2012 parliamentary election, Jerónimo did not stand as a candidate.

As of 2009, Jerónimo was a member of the National AIDS Commission of Timor-Leste. From 2016 to 2020, he was Consul General of Timor-Leste in Kupang, Indonesia. In February 2018, he was elected as the new President of the Timor-Leste Football Federation (Portuguese: Federação de Futebol de Timor-Leste (FFTL)), the governing body of football in Timor-Leste.

Following a change in the governing coalition, and the admission of Fretilin to the VIII Constitutional Government, Jerónimo was sworn in as Minister of Parliamentary Affairs and Social Communication on 29 May 2020. In that capacity, he had a mission to ensure communication between the Government and the National Parliament, and to deal with public and private social communication institutions. He also assisted all ministries with the dissemination of their activities.

In January 2022, an East Timorese news portal, Hatutan.com, published a story alleging that Jerónimo had been involved in a fraudulent project for the installation of television set-top boxes. The following month, the portal published a reply by Jerónimo to the story.

At the end of February 2022, Jerónimo was re-elected as President of FFTL at the Federation's 7th National Conference, by 11 votes out of 21. During his victory speech, he pledged to bring football closer to the municipalities and administrative posts across Timor-Leste, recruit more referees, establish more leagues, promote women's football, and commit to developing an international standard pitch to host regional matches.

On 18 May 2022, Jerónimo initiated criminal defamation proceedings against Francisco Belo Simões da Costa, the editor-in-chief of Hatutan.com, under Article 285 of Timor-Leste's Penal Code. The following week, the Timor-Leste Press Union (TLPU) and the International Federation of Journalists (IFJ) both urged Jerónimo and the authorities to drop the case; the IFJ also criticised Article 285.

Several months later, in October 2022, the Anti-Corruption Commission (CAC) arrested two people in connection with the set-top box project; one of them was an advisor to Jerónimo as Minister, and the other was his former secretary as President of FFTL. CAC agents also raided several offices and seized documents and other material under authority of search warrants. According the Portuguese news agency Lusa, the CAC was acting on suspicions of abuse of power and favoritism in relation to a contract that Jerónimo had signed with a company, Dili Eternal Innovation Information, for the set-top box project. Although Jerónimo refused to comment to Lusa on the arrests, he denied that there had been any favoritism or abuse of power, and accused the CAC agents of acting "with a lack of ethics".

Soon afterwards, the government of Timor-Leste published a statement asserting that no government member had been charged with any crime in connection with the CAC investigation, and referred to the immunity of the holders of sovereign bodies.

At the Congress of the ASEAN Football Federation in Siem Reap, Cambodia, in November 2022, Jerónimo was elected as one of the three Vice Presidents of that Federation for the period 2022–26.

On 4 January 2023, Jerónimo was questioned under oath and made a statement to the CAC about the set-top box project. He also confirmed to journalists that the CAC had told him that he, too, was a suspect, and had been indicted, in connection with its investigation into that project.

Jerónimo's tenure as Minister ended, and his ministerial post was abolished, when the IX Constitutional Government took office on 1 July 2023.
