= Edit Savio =

East Timorese footballer

Personal information
- Full name: Edit Romanos Cristovão Savio
- Date of birth: 26 August 1992 (age 34)
- Place of birth: Lospalos, Indonesia
- Height: 1.70 m (5 ft 7 in)
- Position: Forward

Team information
- Current team: Boavista FC Timor Leste

Senior career*
Years	Team	Apps	(Gls)
–2016	Aitana FC		
2016–	Boavista FC Timor Leste		

International career^{‡}
2017–	Timor-Leste	4	(0)
- * Club domestic league appearances and goals as of 5 January 2019 ‡ National team caps and goals as of 5 January 2019

Edit Romanos Cristovão Savio (born 26 August 1992), simply known as Edit Savio, is a Timorese professional footballer who plays for Boavista FC Timor Leste and the Timor-Leste national football team.

== International career ==
Savio made his senior international debut on 4 December 2017 in a 3–1 friendly defeat to Chinese Taipei.
