= 2017 LFA Super Taça =

Karketu Dili	Atlético Ultramar
(Dili District)	(Manatuto District)
4	0
- Date: 18 November 2017
- Venue: Estádio Municipal, Baucau

The 2017 LFA Super Taça was the second staging of the LFA Super Taça. A cup played in a single game between the two best teams in the country.

Participants are classified through two main competitions: Liga Futebol Amadora Primeira Divisão and Taça 12 de Novembro.

The match of this edition of ST was played on November 18, 2017, at the Estádio Municipal Baucau in the city of Baucau, in East Timor.

== Teams ==
The cup was disputed by two teams: one classified through the 2018 Liga Futebol Amadora Primeira Divisão and the other through the 2017 Taça 12 de Novembro.

The Karketu Dili team was champion of the 2017 Liga Futebol Amadora Primeira Divisão and Atlético Ultramar team was champion of the 2017 Taça 12 de Novembro. Thus, the two teams won the right to compete in the SuperTaça.

== Final ==
18 November 2017
Final 2017

(Dili District) Karketu Dili	4–0
Oligario Boavida 45', 48'; Alan Leandro 55' (pen.); Henrique Conceição 72'	Report

Estádio Municipal, Baucau, East Timor
