= Fagio Augusto =

East Timorese footballer

Personal information
- Full name: Fagio Augusto da Silva Pereira
- Date of birth: 29 April 1997 (age 29)
- Place of birth: East Timor, Indonesia
- Height: 1.80 m (5 ft 11 in)
- Position: Goalkeeper

Team information
- Current team: Karketu Dili

Youth career
- Teouma Academy

Senior career*
Years	Team	Apps	(Gls)
2015	FC Porto Taibesi		
2016	Tokyo Musashino City FC		
2017–	Karketu Dili		

International career^{‡}
2014–2016	Timor-Leste U-19	7	(0)
2014	Timor-Leste (futsal)	4	(0)
2016–	Timor-Leste	7	(0)
- * Club domestic league appearances and goals ‡ National team caps and goals as of 13 November 2016

Fagio Augusto da Silva Pereira (born 29 April 1997) is a Timorese footballer who plays as goalkeeper for Karketu Dili.

== International careers ==
Augusto made his international debut for the Timor-Leste national team as an 87th-minute substitute against Malaysia on 8 June 2016. Before debut he was part of Timor-Leste national futsal team in the 2014 AFF Futsal Championship.
