= Emmanuel FC =

Emmanuel
- Full name: Emmanuel Futebol Clube
- Founded: 2017; 9 years ago
- Ground: Kampo Democrasia, Dili
- Capacity: 1,000
- League: Liga Futebol Amadora Primeira Divisão
- 2025: 2nd
| Home colours | Away colours |

Emmanuel Futebol Clube is a professional football club of East Timor based in Dili. The team plays in the Liga Futebol Amadora, the top flight league in Timor.

Between 2017 and 2019, The club played in the third division of the national football championship (2019 LFA Terceira), getting promoted in the latter to the second division (Liga Futebol Amadora Segunda Divisão).

== Competitions per year ==
=== 2017 ===
In 2017, the Liga Futebol Amadora Terceira Divisão had not yet been created. However, the FFTL organized a playoff competition officially named as the Segunda Divisaun Promotion Playoff. And it was in this competition that the official debut of the Emmanuel team took place on 19 May 2017 against FIEL .

The three teams with the best campaigns would (AS Lero (Iliomar), Lalenok United (Dili) and Fiel) win the right to join Liga Futebol Amadora Segunda Divisão. The Emmanuel team was unable to gain access.

=== 2019 ===
In 2019 FFTL created Liga Futebol Amadora Terceira Divisão. The competition 2019 Liga Futebol Amadora Terceira Divisão had the participation of 11 teams divided into 2 groups. Two teams (The best team in each group) would be promoted to Liga Futebol Amadora Segunda Divisão. With 5 wins in 5 matches, the Emmanuel FC team managed to get the promotion with the best campaign.

=== 2020 ===
Due to the pandemic of COVID-19, the FFTL canceled the 2020 edition of LFA Primeira and also LFA Segunda, a competition in which Emmanuel would participate for the first time. Instead of this, the FFTL carried out only the competitions 2020 Copa FFTL and the Taça 12 de Novembro. Emmanuel played in both competitions.

==== Copa FFTL ====
In 2020, the club participated in the 2020 Copa FFTL, the competition had 20 clubs divided into 4 groups of 5 teams, the two teams that had the most points in the group would advance to the Quarterfinals. With just one win, one draw and two defeats, Emmanuel team ended their participation in third place in group D.

==== Taça 12 de Novembro ====
The 2020 edition of the Taça 12 de Novembro was played by 19 clubs. The competition was divided into 5 phases: preliminary round, quarter-finals, semi-finals and final.

Emmanuel did not have to compete in the preliminary round and has already started in the second round by winning the Santa Cruz (East Timor) team 2–0.

Emmanuel's team was eliminated in the quarterfinals after losing the match against Boavista by the score of 3–0.

== Squad List ==
Current Squad as of January 2026 for the Taça da Liga Timor-Leste 2026

Note: Flags indicate national team as defined under FIFA eligibility rules; some limited exceptions apply. Players may hold more than one non-FIFA nationality.

| No. | Pos. | Nation | Player |
|---|---|---|---|
| 30 | GK | TLS | Alexandre O.L. Quintao |
| 2 | | TLS | Juvito Moniz |
| 15 | | TLS | Ricardo R. dos S. Bianco |
| 13 | | TLS | Miguel K. da C.O. Silva |
| 20 | | TLS | Freteliano Santos (Captain) |
| 18 | | TLS | Amancio Soares Araujo |
| 6 | | TLS | Dramicioa Moreirra |
| 7 | | TLS | Angenucu do C. Viegas |
| 11 | | TLS | Mario Quintao |
| 17 | | TLS | Paulo Gusmao |

| No. | Pos. | Nation | Player |
|---|---|---|---|
| 3 | | GHA | Vincent Kojo Nortey |
| 1 | | TLS | Carvarinha C.C. Fernandes |
| 14 | | TLS | Sandro Lima |
| 16 | | TLS | Nilton Carvalho |
| 5 | | TLS | Palomito Kevin |
| 21 | | TLS | Deonizio D.S. Rangel |
| 22 | | TLS | Deonedio A.M. de Oliveira |
| 12 | | TLS | Jeronimo Nono |
| 4 | | TLS | Romario Egas Moniz |
| 8 | | TLS | Angelito Tilman |
| 9 | | TLS | Alexandro Moreira |

== Competition Record ==
Competitive records from RSSSF.

| Season | Competition | Pld | W | D | L | GF | GA | GD | Pts | Position | National Cup: Taça 12 de Novembro |
|---|---|---|---|---|---|---|---|---|---|---|---|
| 2019 | 3a Divisaun | 5 | 5 | 0 | 0 | 15 | 6 | +9 | 15 | 1st in Group A (Promoted) | |
| 2020 | Copa FFTL | 4 | 1 | 1 | 2 | 4 | 9 | −5 | 4 | 3rd in Group D | Quarter Finals |
| 2021 | Segunda Divisão | 5 | 4 | 0 | 1 | 18 | 4 | +14 | 12 | 1st in Group A Champions (Promoted) | |
| 2023 | Primeira Divisão | 8 | 5 | 0 | 3 | 21 | 10 | -11 | 15 | 2nd | |
| 2025 | Primeira Divisão | 9 | 4 | 5 | 0 | 13 | 8 | +5 | 17 | 2nd | |

== Honours ==
=== Segunda Divisão ===
- 2021: Champions

=== Primeira Divisão ===
- 2023: Runners Up
- 2025: Runners Up

=== Taça da Liga Timor-Leste ===
- 2026: Champions
