= Cacusan CF =

- Full name: Cacusan Clube do Futebol
- Ground: Municipal Stadium, Dili
- Capacity: 5,000
- Chairman: João Maneco Soares de Lima Amaral
- Manager: Vasco Fernades
- League: Liga Futebol Amadora
- 2018: 8th, Primera Divisiao (relegation)
Home colours	Away colours

Cacusan Clube do Futebol, commonly known as Cacusan is an East Timorese football club based in Dili. The team plays in the Liga Futebol Amadora.

== Competition records ==
=== Liga Futebol Amadora ===
- 2016 Segunda Divisao: Champions (promotion)

=== Taça 12 de Novembro ===
- 2016: 3rd Round

=== Other Competitions ===
Dailor Tokodede Cup 2025 semi-finalists.
