= Coração FC =

East Timorese football club

- Full name: Coração Football Club
- Ground: Manatuto Stadium, Manatuto
- Capacity: 5,000
- Chairman: Abrão Saldanha
- Manager: Gaspar Quintão da Silva
- League: LFA
- 2025: 6th
Home colours	Away colours

Coração Football Club, formerly known as Atlético Ultramar, is an East Timorese professional football club based in Manatuto, Manatuto Municipality. The team plays in the Liga Futebol Amadora. Ultramar is the only team to have ever won the Taça 12 de Novembro twice, winning the cup in both 2017 and 2018. Despite this the club has struggled in recent seasons, finishing in last place in the Primeira Divisão in 2019 and failing to qualify from the group stage in the Copa FFTL in 2020.

== History ==
In 2023, Atlético Ultramar were renamed as Atlético Ultramar/Coração, before becoming Coração FC in 2025.

== Players ==
=== Current squad ===
Squad as of January 2026 for the Taça da Liga Timor-Leste 2026

Note: Flags indicate national team as defined under FIFA eligibility rules; some limited exceptions apply. Players may hold more than one non-FIFA nationality.

No.	Pos.	Nation	Player
26		TLS	Jose M.F. Gama
5		TLS	Januario Pinto
23		TLS	Afonso Sandro
24		TLS	Lesy Atok
4		TLS	Rosalino de Jesus
10		TLS	Denilson Almeida
14		TLS	Thomas Jeremias
19		TLS	Miguel Barbosa
7		TLS	Rufino Gama
77		TLS	Lazio Piedade
18		IDN	Jepri Simaremare

No.	Pos.	Nation	Player
20		TLS	Alex Gama
75		TLS	Juninho Ximenes
29		TLS	Nelson Castro
21		TLS	Aldo Amaral
6		TLS	Zinedine Lopes
30		TLS	Joao Paulo Sousa
12		TLS	Henrique W. Cruz
69		TLS	Jeca Maia Monteiro
27		TLS	Azevedo Silvestre Gama
11		TLS	Hilario Ximenes
33		TLS	Joao Bosco Vicente
9		TLS	Pascual Lourenco

== Competitive records ==
Competitive records from RSSSF

Season	Competition	Pld	W	D	L	GF	GA	GD	Pts	Position	National Cup: Taça 12 de Novembro	Super Cup: LFA Super Taça
2016	Segunda Divisão	5	3	0	2	14	11	+3	9	3rd in Group A	First Round	
2017	Segunda Divisão	12	10	1	1	37	12	+25	31	1st in Group B (Promoted)	Winners	Runners Up
2018	Primeira Divisão	14	6	4	4	40	16	+24	22	3rd	Winners	Runners Up
2019	Primeira Divisão	14	3	1	10	20	41	−21	10	8th (Relegated)	Quarter Finals	
2020	Copa FFTL	4	1	1	2	5	9	-4	4	4th in Group B		
2021	Segunda Divisão	5	3	1	1	8	11	-3	10	2nd in Group B (Promoted)		
2023	Primeira Divisão	8	3	2	3	8	9	-1	11	5th		
2025	Primeira Divisão	9	2	4	3	9	10	-1	10	6th		

== Club Honours ==
=== Segunda Divisão ===
- 2017: 1st place, Group B

=== Taça 12 de Novembro ===
- 2017: Winners
- 2018: Winners

=== LFA Super Taça ===
- 2017: Runners-up
- 2018: Runners-up

== Former coaches ==
- Francisco Ribeiro
