= Boavida Olegario =

East Timorese footballer

Olegario
Personal information
- Full name: Oleguero Barreto Hornai Pereira Boavida de Araujo
- Date of birth: 24 October 1994 (age 32)
- Place of birth: Dili, East Timor, Indonesia
- Height: 1.60 m (5 ft 3 in)
- Position: Midfielder

Youth career
- 2004–2008: SEJD

Senior career*
Years	Team	Apps	(Gls)
2009–2011	Ad. Dili Oeste	10	(3)
2012–	SLB Dili		

International career^{‡}
2009–2010	Timor-Leste U-16	7	(1)
2012–2015	Timor-Leste U-23	7	(0)
2010–2021	Timor-Leste	18	(0)
- * Club domestic league appearances and goals ‡ National team caps and goals as of 14 December 2021

Boavida Olegario (born October 24, 1994) is a football player. He is the current midfielder for the Timor-Leste national football team.

== International career ==
He made his senior international debut for Timor-Leste national football team on 21 November 2010 coming off the bench in the second half in a friendly match against Indonesia national football team when he was aged 16 years 28 days. He made first tournament debut on 13 October 2012 coming off the bench in the second half in a match against Brunei national football team in the 2012 AFF Suzuki Cup qualification.
