= AS Ponta Leste =

Ponta Leste
- Full name: Associação Sportivo e Ponta Leste
- Founded: 1991; 35 years ago
- Ground: Municipal Stadium, Dili
- Capacity: 5,000
- Owner(s): Inácio Moreira; Osório Florindo
- Chairman: Inacio Moreira
- Manager: Eduardo Pereira
- League: Liga Futebol Timor-Leste
- 2025: 10th

AS Ponta Leste is a professional football club based in Dili, East Timor. The team plays in the Liga Futebol Timor-Leste in the Segunda Divisão. The club's most successful season came in 2016 in which the team won the 2016 Taça 12 de Novembro after beating Assalam FC 1–0 in the final, as well as the Super Taça which they won against league champions Benfica Laulara 2–1. Since then however the team has yet to win any further competitions.

The club owned by Inácio Moreira the Vice-Minister of Public Works, Transport and Communications of Timor Leste and Osório Florindo the vice-president of Federação de Futebol de Timor-Leste.

== Squad ==
Below are a list of known players set to compete in the 2026 Liga Futebol Timor-Leste

Note: Flags indicate national team as defined under FIFA eligibility rules; some limited exceptions apply. Players may hold more than one non-FIFA nationality.

No.	Pos.	Nation	Player
—	GK	TLS	Jemecriz Pereira
—	GK	TLS	Deomantino Madeira
—	DF	TLS	Candido M. Oliveira
—	DF	TLS	Dino V. Amaral
—	DF	TLS	Adriano D. S. Conceicao
—	DF	TLS	Gabriel Ximenes Belo
—	DF	TLS	Cano E. Freitas Xavier
—	DF	TLS	Leonardo Da Costa
—	DF	TLS	Armando Soares
—	DF	TLS	Salvador Dos Santos
—	DF	TLS	Kon Kawahara
—	DF	TLS	Alexandre Conceicao

No.	Pos.	Nation	Player
—	MF	TLS	Nelson Sarmento Soares
—	MF	TLS	Francisco R. Costa
—	MF	TLS	Gaudencio D. Osorio
—	MF	TLS	Sebastiao Dos Santos
—	MF	TLS	Edson B. Dos Santos
—	MF	TLS	Karol Matins
—	MF	TLS	Manuel Jovanio
—	FW	TLS	Deonato Dos Santos
—	FW	TLS	Dilivio Dos Santos
—	FW	TLS	Ario Melio Ximenes
—	FW	TLS	Julvito Jorge
—	FW	TLS	Ricardo Taymenas
—	FW	TLS	Cristiano De Dues
—	FW	TLS	Pedro Carvalho
—	FW	TLS	Alberto Pinkianus

== Competition records ==
Competitive records from RSSSF

Season	Competition	Pld	W	D	L	GF	GA	GD	Pts	Position	National Cup: Taça 12 de Novembro	Super Cup: LFA Super Taça
2016	Primeira Divisão	14	6	3	5	16	16	0	21	3rd	Winners	Winners
2017	Primeira Divisão	14	7	4	3	28	16	+12	25	2nd	Quarter Finals	
2018	Primeira Divisão	14	6	4	4	29	17	+12	22	4th	Semi Finals	
2019	Primeira Divisão	14	7	2	5	22	18	+4	23	3rd	Round of 16	
2020	Copa FFTL	4	4	0	0	17	2	+15	12	1st in Group B Quarter Finals		
2021	Primeira Divisão	6	2	2	2	4	4	0	8	3rd		
2023	Primeira Divisão	8	4	1	3	13	9	+4	13	4th		
2025	Primeira Divisão	9	2	3	4	7	11	-4	9	10th (Relegated)		

== Club honours ==
=== Liga Futebol Timor Leste Primeira Divisão ===
- 2017: Runners Up

=== Taça 12 de Novembro ===
- 2016: Champions

=== LFA Super Taça ===
- 2016: Champions
