= Football Federation of Timor-Leste =

Timor-Leste football governing body

AFC
- Founded: 2002; 24 years ago
- FIFA affiliation: 2005
- AFC affiliation: 2002 (Associate member); 2005
- AFF affiliation: 2004
- President: Francisco MCP Jeronimo
- Website: http://www.fftl.tl/

The Football Federation of Timor-Leste (Portuguese: Federação de Futebol de Timor-Leste - FFTL) is the governing body of football in Timor-Leste.

In 2016 Timor-Leste run their own league under supervision of and Secretary of State for Youth and Sport. The name of the league is Liga Futebol Amadora do Timor-Leste (lit. 'Amateur Football League of East Timor').

== FFTL bodies ==
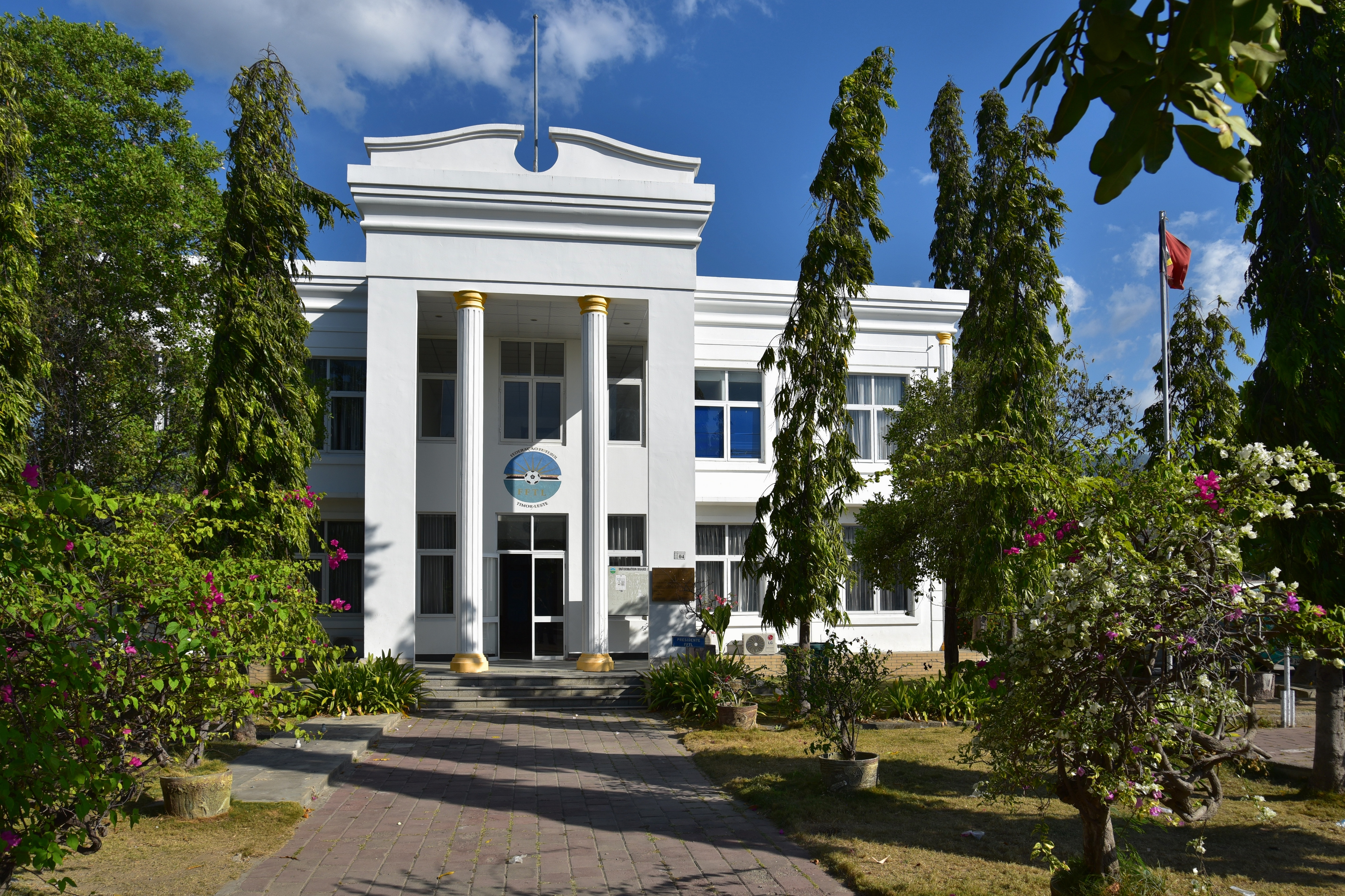
Timor-Leste Football Federation building in Dili, East Timor

=== Executive committee ===
Name	Position	Source
(Timor-Leste) Nilton Gusmão	President	
(Timor-Leste) Falur Rate Laek	Vice President	
Germano Da Silva	2nd Vice President	
Aleixo Da Silva Gama	3rd Vice President	
(Timor-Leste) Nelyo Isaac Sarmento	General Secretary	
Eulalia Araujo Dos Reis	Treasurer	
(Brazil) Fabio Magrão	Technical Director	
(Japan) Norio Tsukitate	Team Coach (Men's)	
(South Korea) Lee Chung-ho	Team Coach (Women's)	
(Timor-Leste) Rogerio Pires	Media/Communications Manager	
Henrique Da Costa	Futsal Coordinator	
(Timor-Leste) Nivio Da Costa Fernandes	Referee Coordinator	

=== Players ===
All players	Registered players	Youth Players (U8-U14)	Unregistered Players	Clubs	Academy	Officials
15,500	567	2,550	5,000	21	17	147

== Principal officials of FFTL ==
=== Chairmen ===
- Francisco Kalbuadi Lay (2002–2007 and 2008–2018)
- Pedro Carrascalao (2007–2008)
- Francisco MCP Jeronimo (2018–2025)
- Nilton Gusmão (2025–present)

== Venues ==
- National Stadium, Dili
- Estadio Timor Soul, Baucau
- Estadio Malibaka Maliana, Bobonaro
- Estadio Gleno, Ermera
- Estadio Manatuto, Manatuto

== National teams ==
Currently, Timor Leste has the following football national teams:

- Timor-Leste national football team
- Timor-Leste national under-23 football team
- Timor-Leste national under-21 football team
- Timor-Leste national under-19 football team
- Timor-Leste national under-16 football team
- Timor-Leste women's national football team
- Timor-Leste women's national under-19 football team
- Timor-Leste women's national under-16 football team
- Timor-Leste national futsal team

== Controversies and critics ==
=== Francisco Kalbuadi Lay corruption scandal ===
The chairman of FFTL Francisco Kalbuadi Lay did not win the FFTL Presidential Race at the 2007 Extraordinary Congress; however, Kalbuadi continued his presidency until now. Pedro Carrascalao, who claimed he won the Presidential Race, had not worked at FFTL office since 2007. At 2007 Extraordinary Congress Carrascalao had 13 voting members who elected him as the President of FFTL. Carrascalao alleges that FFTL members were forced to call an Extraordinary Congress in 2007 after the organisation failed to hold a regular Congress – in which a Presidential vote would have been held – in the necessary timeframe. He says members were also greatly concerned about potential corruption within the organisation at the time.

=== General Secretary: Amandio Sarmento Scandal ===
In February 2017, FIFA terminated and banned General Secretary Amandio Sarmento of FFTL. Sarmento was banned for three years of football activity. Furthermore, Sarmento was guilty of using falsified documents in connection with the fielding of ineligible players by Timor-Leste.

== Players that joined Overseas club ==
List of originsTimor-Leste players that plays overseas
Players	Club	League
Elias Mesquita	Kota Ranger	Brunei Super League
Jhon Frith	ISI Dangkor Senchey	Cambodian Premier League
Mouzinho	Visakha	Cambodian Premier League
Zenivio	Kirivong Sok Sen Chey	Cambodian Premier League
Georgino Mendonça	Life FC	Cambodian League 2
Olagar Xavier	Siem Reap	Cambodian League 2
Cristevão Fernandes	Angkor City	Cambodian League 2
Fagio Augusto	Tokyo Musashino United	Japan Football League
Gali Freitas	PSIS Semarang	Liga 1
João Pedro	Ubon United, UiTM, Benfica de Macau, PSM Makassar	Thai League 2, Malaysia Super League, Liga de Elite, Liga 1
Filomeno Junior	Benfica de Macau	Liga de Elite
Anggisu Barbosa	Sriracha, Pattaya City	Thai Division 1 League, Thai Regional League Division 2

== See also ==
- Liga Futebol Timor-Leste
- National Olympic Committee of Timor Leste
- Sport in Timor-Leste
