= Sport Laulara e Benfica =

Association football club in Timor-Leste

SLB Laulara
- Full name: Associação Desportiva e Sport Laulara e Benfica
- Nickname: The Laulara Tiger
- Chairman: Xanana Gusmão
- Manager: Kim Shin Hwan
- League: Liga Futebol Timor-Leste
- 2025: 8th
| Home colours | Away colours |

Associação Desportiva e Sport Laulara e Benfica, also known as Benfica Laulara or SLB Laulara, is a professional football team from Laulara, Aileu District, Timor-Leste, that plays in the Liga Futebol Timor-Leste in the Primeira Divisão. The club have 1 league title in their history.

The club chairman is Timor-Leste Prime Minister Xanana Gusmão.

== Club history ==
=== Liga Futebol Timor-Leste ===
Associação Desportiva e Sport Laulara e Benfica was part of the inaugural season of the Liga Futebol Timor-Leste in 2016, forming one of the 8 original Primeira Divisão clubs. In this season SLB Laulara became the first ever champion, finishing with an equal record and goal difference to runners up Karketu Dili F.C., however winning the title due to having 4 extra goals scored across the league season. In the same season SLB Laulara would lose the Super Taça match to Taça 12 de Novembro cup winners Ponta Leste.

In the following seasons SLB Laulara would remain one of the top clubs in the country. This included finishing runners up in the 2019 and 2020 Taça 12 de Novembro, the 2020 Copa FFTL and the 2019 Super Taça, losing all the final in all 4 competitions to Lalenok United. To date however they are yet to win another competition.

=== 2023 Primeira Divisão controversy ===
In the 2023 Liga Futebol Timor-Leste Primeira Divisão, Heading into the final match of the season SLB Laulara was in 1st place, 2 points ahead of title contenders Karketu Dili F.C.. Both teams were scheduled to play against each other on the final match day, with SLB Laulara requiring a draw in order to win the title.

Prior to the match taking place however, SLB Laulara raised a dispute with the league due to five of their first team players being unavailable, due to being called up to play for Timor-Leste U23 national team at the SEA games. SLB laulara requested that the game either be postponed to a later date, or that the club be allowed to sign replacement players to reinforce their team for the match. The club however claimed to never receive a response to their request from the Liga Futebol Timor-Leste governing body. In retaliation, SLB Laulara decided to not show up to the final match of the season against Karketu, leading to the match being forfeited and awarding Karketu Dili the title.

In response to the walk out SLB Laulara were fined $1000 USD and had 3 points deducted by the LFTL, demoting the team down to 3rd place on the table. While the previously established penalty for walking out of a game was relegation however, SLB Laulara avoided this penalty with the league noting differences in the situation compared to previous instances of club walk outs. This decision was criticised by 2nd place finisher Emmanuel FC, stating that the small penalty awarded could lead to future incidents of match fixing within the league, calling for the club to be relegated. Despite these calls SLB Laulara were allowed to keep their spot in the Primeira Divisão for the following season.

=== 2024 Copa FFTL controversy ===
In 2024 the Liga Futebol Timor-Leste season was not held, being replaced by the second edition of the Copa FFTL. Initially teams from the top two divisions of the Liga Futebol Timor-Leste were expected to compete in this competition, filling the void of no other national competitions taking place. After the competition had been announced however multiple teams including SLB Laulara and Assalam FC were reported as disagreeing with the FFTL's organisation of the tournament, noting that there was a lack of any formal consultation between clubs and the football federation taking place before the competition was announced. This, alongside a lack of financial support to teams provided resulted in SLB Laulara not registering for the competition, alongside all but 3 of the top two division clubs.

== Players ==
=== Current squad ===
Current squad as of January 2026 for the Taça da Liga Timor-Leste 2026

Note: Flags indicate national team as defined under FIFA eligibility rules; some limited exceptions apply. Players may hold more than one non-FIFA nationality.

| No. | Pos. | Nation | Player |
|---|---|---|---|
| 12 | GK | TLS | Filonito Nugeira |
| 32 | | TLS | Fernando D. de Carvalho |
| 20 | | TLS | Almerito A. da Silva |
| 7 | | TLS | Luis Figo Ribeiro |
| 28 | | TLS | Germano Junior |
| 18 | | TLS | Totifanio de Fatima |
| 11 | | TLS | Leonio Quilton L. Freitas |
| 16 | | TLS | Vabio Canavaro A.S. Pires |
| 24 | MF | TLS | Mouzinho |
| 9 | | TLS | Filomeno Junior (Captain) |

| No. | Pos. | Nation | Player |
|---|---|---|---|
| 31 | | TLS | Georgino da Silva |
| 6 | | TLS | Luis Berdila |
| 22 | | TLS | Norbert Gonçalves |
| 3 | | TLS | Orselio Norberto |
| 13 | | TLS | Edencio S. da Costa |
| 8 | | TLS | Natalino da Costa |
| 17 | | TLS | Jose Arango |
| 23 | | IDN | Muhamad Dzakir Karozi |
| 4 | | GHA | Gbolahan A. Tanimola |
| 44 | | NGA | Ayomide Peter Amos |
| 25 | | TLS | Joneil F.I. Sarmento |
| 29 | | TLS | Waldir Ray X. Pereira |

== Competition records ==
Competitive records from RSSSF

| Season | Competition | Pld | W | D | L | GF | GA | GD | Pts | Position | National Cup: Taça 12 de Novembro | Super Cup: Super Taça |
|---|---|---|---|---|---|---|---|---|---|---|---|---|
| 2005–06 | Super Liga | - | - | - | - | - | - | - | - | 2nd Round | - | - |
| 2016 | Primeira Divisão | 14 | 5 | 6 | 3 | 22 | 18 | +4 | 21 | 1st (Champions) | Semi-Finals | Runners Up |
| 2017 | Primeira Divisão | 14 | 6 | 3 | 5 | 20 | 15 | +5 | 21 | 4th | Semi-Finals | - |
| 2018 | Primeira Divisão | 14 | 5 | 7 | 2 | 24 | 16 | +8 | 22 | 5th | Semi-Finals | - |
| 2019 | Primeira Divisão | 14 | 5 | 4 | 5 | 30 | 27 | +3 | 19 | 5th | Runners Up | Runners Up |
| 2020 | Copa FFTL | 4 | 4 | 0 | 0 | 22 | 2 | +20 | 12 | 1st in Group D (Qualified) Runners Up | Runners Up | - |
| 2021 | Primeira Divisão | 6 | 1 | 4 | 1 | 9 | 8 | +1 | 7 | 4th | - | - |
| 2023 | Primeira Divisão | 8 | 5 | 2 | 1 | 13 | 11 | +2 | 14* | 3rd | - | - |
| 2025 | Primeira Divisão | 9 | 2 | 3 | 4 | 10 | 10 | 0 | 9 | 8th | - | - |

*In 2023 SLB Laulara had 3 points deducted

== Club honours ==
=== Liga Futebol Timor-Leste Primeira Divisão ===
- 2016: Champions

== Affiliated clubs ==
The following clubs are affiliated with SLB Laulara:

- (Portugal) S.L.Benfica (Primeira Liga)
- Sport Benfica e Castelo Branco (Campeonato de Portugal)
- (Cape Verde) GD Benfica de Santa Cruz (Santiago South Premier Division)
- (Jamaica) Benfica F.C.
