= Lalenok United F.C. =

Lalenok United
- Full name: Lalenok United Football Club
- Nickname: The Lobsters
- Founded: 2016; 10 years ago
- Ground: Café Ermera
- Chairman: Pedro Belo
- League: Liga Futebol Amadora Primeira Divisão
Home colours	Away colours

Lalenok United Football Club, commonly known as Lalenok United, is an East Timorese professional football club based in Dili. The team plays in the Liga Futebol Amadora Primeira Divisão, after finishing runners up and being promoted from the Segunda Divisão in 2018. The club have won 1 league titles and 1 LFA Super Taça.

== History ==
In 2019 the team won the Primeira Divisão title, finishing the season with a total of 30 points from 14 matches, 5 points clear of previous champion Boavista.

In the same season the team also won the Taça 12 de Novembro and the LFA Super Taça, becoming the first Timorese team to ever win all three competitions. In 2020 Lalenok became the first East Timorese club to ever compete at the continental level

=== 2020 AFC Cup qualification ===

2020 AFC Cup starting lineup

After the team's victory in the 2019 LFA Primeira Divisão season Lalenok United became the first ever East Timorese club to compete at the continental competition. Drawn up against Indonesian Liga 1 side PSM Makassar for their first match, Lalenok United president Pedro Belo admitted that the team likely did not have a big chance for their debut in the competition. Belo recognised the strength of the opposition side, however had confidence that the squad would work hard in its attempts to represent football within Timor Leste and was proud of the international recognition the club had achieved from qualifying.

The first leg of the match was a home game for Lalenok, however it was played at Kapten I Wayan Dipta Stadium rather than at the club's own stadium. Lalenok United got off to an early lead with a goal being scored by striker Daniel Adade in the second minute. PSM Makassar were quick to equalise, and later Indonesian side proceeded to score 4 goals, ending the game as a 1–4 loss for Lalenok United.

In the second leg the team suffered a similar result, losing the match 3–1. The team's only goal was scored by defender Francisco da Costa. This resulted in an aggregate score of 2–7, causing Lalenok United to be eliminated from the competition.

== Players ==
As of 29 January 2021

Note: Flags indicate national team as defined under FIFA eligibility rules; some limited exceptions apply. Players may hold more than one non-FIFA nationality.

No.	Pos.	Nation	Player
13	DF	TLS	Elias Sanches
14	DF	TLS	Duarte Ximenes
20	DF	TLS	Gaspar Lucas
29	DF	TLS	Ribeiro
40	GK	TLS	Fagio Augusto
46	GK	TLS	Tavares
99	FW	TLS	Rufino Gama
—	MF	TLS	Osvaldo Belo
—	MF	TLS	Osório
—	FW	BRA	Ítalo

== Competitive records ==
- 2017: Promotion playoff Winners
- 2018: Runners up

=== Primeira Divisão ===
- 2019: Champions

=== Taça 12 de Novembro ===
- 2018: Quarterfinals
- 2019: Champions
- 2020: Champions

=== LFA Super Taça ===
- 2019: Champions

=== Copa FFTL ===
- 2020: Champions

== Honours ==
=== League ===
- Primeira Divisão
  - Champions (1): 2019

=== Cup ===
- LFA Super Taça
  - Winners (1): 2019
- Copa FFTL
  - Winners (1): 2020

== Continental record ==
Season	Competition	Round	Club	Home	Away	Aggregate
2020	AFC Cup	Qualifying play-off round	(Indonesia) PSM Makassar	1–4	3–1	2–7
2021	AFC Cup	Preliminary round 2	Cancelled			
