= Liga Futebol Timor-Leste Primeira Divisão =

Primeira Divisão
- Founded: 2015; 11 years ago
- Country: Timor Leste
- Confederation: AFC
- Number of clubs: 10
- Level on pyramid: 1
- Relegation to: Segunda Divisão
- Domestic cup(s): Taça 12 de Novembro; Super Taça
- International cup: AFC Challenge League
- Current champions: SLB Laulara (2nd title) (2026)
- Most championships: Karketu Dili (4 titles)
- Current: 2026 Liga Futebol Timor-Leste

Liga Futebol Timor-Leste Primeira Divisão (often referred to as the Primeira Divisão) is the men's top level professional football competition of Timor Leste in the Timorense football league system. It forms part of the Liga Futebol Timor-Leste league system.

== History ==
The Primera Divisão started from the 2016 season as part of the Liga Futebol Amadora competition, replacing the Super Liga Timorense as the top tier league in Timor Leste. SLB Laulara become the first champions of the inaugural league. In 2020, Lalenok United became the first team from the competition to represent Timor Leste in the AFC Cup after winning the competition in 2019, however, due to the outbreak of COVID-19 pandemic, the tournament was cancelled.

In 2020 the competition was renamed from the Liga Futebol Amadora to the Liga Futebol Timor-Leste.

In 2024 the competition was not run, being replaced by the Copa FFTL.

Timor Leste club is then given a qualifying play-off phase from the 2025–26 AFC Challenge League onwards.

== Overview ==
=== Asian club competition eligibility ===
The champions of the league are eligible for represent Timor Leste in the AFC Challenge League qualification round.

=== Relegation from Primeira Divisão ===
Up to two teams at the bottom of the league will face a direct relegation to the Segunda Divisão.

== Championship history ==
| Years | Champion | Runners-up | 3rd place | Ref |
|---|---|---|---|---|
| 2016 | SLB Laulara | Karketu Dili | Porto Taibesi | |
| 2017 | Karketu Dili | Ponta Leste | Boavista TL | |
| 2018 | Boavista TL | Karketu Dili | Atlético Ultramar | |
| 2019 | Lalenok United | Boavista | Ponta Leste | |
Not held
| 2021 | Karketu Dili | Lalenok United | Ponta Leste | |
Not held
| 2023 | Karketu Dili | Emmanuel | SLB Laulara | |
| 2025 | Karketu Dili | Emmanuel | Porto Taibessi | |
| 2026 | SLB Laulara | Santa Cruz | Karketu Dili | |

=== Titles by club ===
| Club | Winners | Runner-up | Years won |
|---|---|---|---|
| Karketu Dili | 4 | 2 | 2017, 2021, 2023, 2025 |
| SLB Laulara | 2 | 0 | 2016, 2026 |
| Lalenok United | 1 | 1 | 2019 |
| Boavista | 1 | 1 | 2018 |
| Emmanuel | 0 | 2 | – |
| Ponta Leste | 0 | 1 | – |
| Santa Cruz | 0 | 1 | – |

== Awards ==
=== Top scorers ===
| Year | Scorer | Club | Goals | Ref |
|---|---|---|---|---|
| 2016 | (Indonesia) Patrich Wanggai | Karketu Dili | 10 | |
| 2017 | (Brazil) Tingga | Karketu Dili | 13 | |
| 2018 | (Brazil) Fábio Christian | Atlético Ultramar | 17 | |
| 2019 | (Ghana) Daniel Adade | Assalam | 12 | |
| 2021 | (Ghana) Daniel Adade (Timor-Leste) Hasan Costa (Timor-Leste) Francyatma Kefi | Lalenok United | 5 | |
| 2023 | (Timor-Leste) Edit Savio | Emmanuel | 7 | |
| 2025 | (Timor-Leste) José Santos | DIT | 7 | |
| 2026 | (Brazil) Ítalo Pimentel | SLB Laulara | 8 | |

=== Best XI ===
| Year | Goalkeeper | Defender | Midfielder | Striker | Ref |
|---|---|---|---|---|---|
| 2016 | (Timor-Leste) Fagio Augusto (Porto) | (Timor-Leste) Nelson Viegas (Karketu) (Timor-Leste) Nelson Mendonca (Benfica) (Timor-Leste) Anggisu Barbosa (Porto) (Timor-Leste) Ade (Ponta Leste) | (Timor-Leste) Nataniel Reis (Carsae) (Timor-Leste) Boavida Olegario (Académica) (Timor-Leste) José Oliveira (Benfica) | (Timor-Leste) João Pedro (Benfica) (Timor-Leste) Rufino Gama (Académica) (Timor-Leste) Silveiro Garcia (Ponta Leste) | |
