= Boavista Futebol Clube Timor-Leste =

Boavista TL
- Full name: Boavista Futebol Clube Timor Leste
- Nickname(s): Youth From Where The Sun Rises
- Short name: BFC-TL
- Founded: 1986; 39 years ago as Kumpulan Anak Remaja Lorosae; 2018; 7 years ago as Boavista Futebol Clube Timor Leste
- Ground: Municipal Stadium, Dili
- Capacity: 5,000
- Owner: Pedro Carrascalão
- Manager: Joao Pedro Dos S. S. Da C. Ribeiro
- League: Liga Futebol Amadora
Home colours	Away colours

Boavista Futebol Clube Timor Leste or Boavista Timor Leste also abbreviated as BFC-TL, were a football club of East Timor based in Dili. The team played in the Liga Futebol Amadora and won 1 Primeira Divisão league title and 1 LFA Super Taça.

== History ==
=== Kumpulan Anak Remaja Lorosae ===
Originally the club formed in 1986 when Pedro Carrascalão was a high school student during the period when East Timor was still under Indonesian occupation. But he closed it just after the incident at Santa Cruz, which refer to as the 12 November massacre. Originally the name of the club was based on a cultural expression, Kumpulan Anak Remaja Lorosae, which in Indonesian means the youth from where the sun rises. But he had trouble when he used that name as some of players were active in the clandestine movement and were being chased by Indonesian intelligence forces, so he decided to simplify things and base the new name off an abbreviation of my surname. His father was working as a governor at the time and it was the only way for him to protect his friends and keep the Indonesian military off.

It would be almost two-and-a-half decades before the chance arose for Carrascalao to revive the club and, despite some reservations with how football was being run in the country, he decided it was the right time to try to give young Timorese footballers a stage on which to display their talents. He decided to open the club again in 2015 when there was a clear sign that there was going to be a national league in place for the very first time. In less than four months the club was reassembled, staff was hired and players were recruited to participate in the top flight of the new government-funded Liga Futebol Amadora or LFA the first official league in the nation's history. The club's goal for the next three years is to become the biggest club in East Timor just as we were when the club was first founded from 1986 to 1991; then we started with football, then volleyball, then basketball for both men and women and we were pretty much number one year after year.

The maiden season of the LFA began in late February with eight teams scheduled to play each other in a home and away format, all matches held at the centralised Dili Municipal Stadium. Carsae made a winning start by defeating D.I.T 1–0. With another division below the top flight there will also be a cup competition, aptly named the 12th November Cup, and then a Super Taça which will pit both the league and cup champions against each other. The hope is this can be a new dawn for the sport, which is easily the most popular throughout the nation.

=== Boavista Timor Leste ===
In 2018, the club changed it name to Boavista Futebol Clube Timor Leste and in its maiden season, it won the league title and cup double.

=== Financial difficulties and withdrawal from the League ===
Following the covid pandemic and the Copa FFTL in 2020, the club withdrew and did not compete in the 2021 Primeira Divisão season. After this in 2022 the club announced that it was withdrawing from the Timorese league system. This due to the club experiencing financial difficulties, stating that it could not meet the leagues financial requirements.

== Honours ==
=== League ===
- Liga Futebol Amadora
  - Champions (1): 2018
  - Runners-up (1): 2019

=== Cup ===
- LFA Super Taça
  - Winners (1): 2018

== Competition records ==
=== Liga Futebol Amadora ===
- 2016: 6th places

=== Taça 12 de Novembro ===
- 2016: 1st Round

== Former coaches ==
- Hugo da Silva
- (Chile) Eladio Rojas

== Links ==
- Facebook
