= Football at the 2015 SEA Games – Group B =

== Standings ==
Pos	Team	Pld	W	D	L	GF	GA	GD	Pts	Qualification
1	Thailand	5	5	0	0	16	1	+15	15	Semi-finals
2	Vietnam	5	4	0	1	17	4	+13	12	Semi-finals
3	Malaysia	5	3	0	2	7	7	0	9	
4	Laos	5	2	0	3	6	13	−7	6	
5	Timor-Leste	5	1	0	4	4	10	−6	3	
6	Brunei	5	0	0	5	2	17	−15	0	

Source: Seagames 2015
Rules for classification: 1) Points; 2) Goal difference; 3) Goals scored

== Brunei vs Vietnam ==
In the first game of the tournament it was Vietnam who opened the scoring midway through the first half when an unmarked Lê Thanh Bình poked in Hồ Ngọc Thắng's cross. Vietnam would score again just after the break in similar circumstances as Trần Phi Sơn was once again unmarked to head in Nguyễn Công Phượng's free kick. Vietnam would score four times in the last 15 minutes as the Brunei side tired, first Mạc Hồng Quân finished after a teammate headed the ball down to him, then Ngọc Thắng and Hồng Quân exchanged some neat passes before the former's cross hit into the net by Phạm Đức Huy. Four minutes later Ngọc Thắng's cross was not properly dealt with by the Bruneian defense resulting in Hồng Quân laying the ball off for Công Phượng to score, and with a minute left in normal time Phạm Mạnh Hùng's effort from outside the box was beyond the goalkeeper's reach to complete the rout.

29 May
16:00

Brunei	0–6	Vietnam
	Report	Lê Thanh Bình 24'; Trần Phi Sơn 47'; Mạc Hồng Quân 75'; Phạm Đức Huy 78'; Nguyễn Công Phượng 82'; Phạm Mạnh Hùng 89'

Bishan Stadium, Bishan
Referee: Yousef Al-Marzouq (Kuwait)

GK	1	Md Ahsanuddin Hj Md Dani
DF	4	Khairil Shahme Suhaimi
DF	5	Suhaimi Anak Sulau
MF	8	Ak Yura Indera Putera Pg Yunos
FW	9	Faiq Jefri Bolkiah (c)		(substituted off) 72'
MF	10	Nur Ikhmal Damit
MF	11	Md Aminuddin Zakwan Tahir
MF	20	Muhd Saiful Ammar Hj Adis		(substituted off) 88'
DF	22	Mohd Azri Zahari		(substituted off) 66'
DF	24	Hanif Hamir
MF	27	Azwan Ali Rahman
Substitutions:
MF	3	Mohd Asnawi Syazni Aziz		(substituted on) 88'
FW	21	Mohd Shafie Hj Mohd Effendy		(substituted on) 66'
FW	29	Md Nur Syazwan Halidi	(yellow card) 89'	(substituted on) 72'
Coach:
(Singapore) Stephen Ng Heng Seng

GK	27	Phí Minh Long
DF	3	Phạm Mạnh Hùng (c)
DF	11	Đỗ Duy Mạnh
DF	12	Vũ Ngọc Thịnh
MF	13	Huỳnh Tấn Tài		(substituted off) 70'
MF	14	Nguyễn Huy Hùng		(substituted off) 46'
FW	16	Lê Thanh Bình		(substituted off) 64'
MF	18	Hồ Ngọc Thắng	(yellow card) 18'
FW	20	Trần Phi Sơn
MF	23	Phạm Đức Huy
DF	26	Bùi Tiến Dũng
Substitutions:
FW	10	Nguyễn Công Phượng		(substituted on) 46'
FW	17	Mạc Hồng Quân		(substituted on) 64'
DF	22	Nguyễn Thanh Hiền		(substituted on) 70'
Coach:
(Japan) Toshiya Miura

Assistant referees:
Ghulam Abbas (Kuwait)
Goh Gek Pheng Jeffrey (Singapore)
Fourth official:
Foo Chuan Hui (Singapore)

== Laos vs Thailand ==
Thailand bossed the early stages of the game, and finally broke the deadlock in only 10 minutes as Narubadin Weerawatnodom headed home fellow defender Peerapat Notechaiya's corner. Nine minutes later Thai play-maker Chanathip Songkrasin found Pinyo Inpinit with a fine reverse-pass which the latter put on a plate for Chananan Pombuppha, who couldn't miss. Seven minutes before half time Peerapat broke down the flank and his cross was powerfully dispatched by Nurul Sriyankem. Just a minute after the break Peerapat claimed his third assist of the game as his corner was headed in by Chananan. At the hour mark Nurul was adjudged to have been fouled by Sengdao Inthilath in the box and Chananan confidently scored the penalty kick to complete his hat-trick. The sixth Thai goal came through some lovely interplay between the substitutes ended with Tristan Do floating a fine cross over the Laotian goalkeeper and left Chananan with the task of heading into the empty net for his fourth goal of the game. To their credit Laos never gave up and had too great chances, one in the 35th minute when Thai goaltender Chanin Sae-Eae had to pull off a diving save to keep out Soukaphone Vongchiengkham's effort, and in the 51st when substitute Maitee Sihalath's shot went just over.

29 May
20:30

Laos	0–6	Thailand
	Report	Narubadin 10'; Chananan 19', 47', 62' (pen.), 74'; Nurul 38'

Bishan Stadium, Bishan
Referee: Mo'ud Bonyadifard (Iran)

GK	1	Vathana Keodouangdeth
DF	12	Thenthong Phonsettha	(yellow card) 41'	(substituted off) 87'
DF	19	Sengdao Inthilath	(yellow card) 61'
DF	13	Bounthavy Sipasong
DF	2	Thinnakone Vongsa
MF	14	Soukchinda Natphasouk
MF	21	Tiny Bounmalay (c)
MF	15	Phoutthasay Khochalern
MF	8	Keoviengphet Liththideth		(substituted off) 46'
MF	10	Soukaphone Vongchiengkham		(substituted off) 78'
FW	7	Khonesavanh Sihavong
Substitutions:
MF	11	Maitee Sihalath		(substituted on) 46'
FW	9	Sitthideth Khanthavong		(substituted on) 78'
FW	16	Sinnalone Sihalath		(substituted on) 87'
Coach:
(England) Dave Booth

GK	1	Chanin Sae-Eae
DF	5	Adisorn Promrak
DF	2	Peerapat Notechaiya
DF	8	Artit Daosawang
DF	13	Narubadin Weerawatnodom	(substituted off) 63'
MF	12	Nurul Sriyankem	(substituted off) 63'
MF	6	Sarach Yooyen (c)
MF	7	Thitipan Puangchan
MF	18	Chanathip Songkrasin
MF	11	Pinyo Inpinit	(substituted off) 68'
FW	23	Chananan Pombuppha
Substitutions:
MF	14	Pakorn Prempak	(substituted on) 63'
DF	19	Tristan Do	(substituted on) 63'
MF	29	Rungrath Poomchantuek	(substituted on) 68'
Coach:
(Thailand) Choketawee Promrut

Assistant referees:
Mohammad Reza Mansouri (Iran)
Ahmed Ferdous (Bangladesh)
Fourth official:
Sukhbir Singh (Singapore)

== Malaysia vs Timor-Leste ==
Malaysia took the lead in only the eleventh minute as Nurridzuan Abu Hassan cross was missed by several players although it fell to midfielder D. Saarvindran who effortlessly scored. Syafiq Ahmad had a great opportunity to double the lead three minutes later when a defensive slip up let him through on goal although his shot was deflected for a corner. Thirteen minutes before half time Malaysian midfielder Nazmi Faiz Mansor was shown a straight red card for allegedly spitting at an opponent in an off the ball situation. Chances were few and far between in the second half as 10 man Malaysia were hesitant to take chances and Timor-Leste could not break through their defence. In the seventy third minute the two Malaysian substitutes combined well, with Nazirul Naim Che Hashim's corner being headed against the bar by S. Kumaahran. Timor-Leste's best chance came five minutes from time as Mohd Farhan Abu Bakar had to dive at full stretch to make a superb save from captain Anggisu's free kick.

30 May
20:30

Malaysia	1–0	Timor-Leste
Saarvindran 12'	Report

Bishan Stadium, Bishan
Referee: Foo Chuan Hui (Singapore)

GK	1	Mohd Farhan Abu Bakar
DF	29	Matthew Davies
DF	26	Mohd Amer Saidin
DF	25	Adam Nor Azlin
DF	17	Mohd Fandi Othman (c)
MF	12	Gary Steven Robbat		(substituted off) 75'
MF	16	Nurridzuan Abu Hassan	(yellow card) 37'	(substituted off) 57'
MF	28	Amirul Hisyam Kechik
MF	6	D. Saarvindran
MF	7	Nazmi Faiz Mansor	(red card) 32'
FW	9	Mohd Syafiq Ahmad		(substituted off) 57'
Substitutions:
FW	20	S. Kumaahran	(yellow card) 87'	(substituted on) 57'
DF	21	Nazirul Naim Che Hashim		(substituted on) 57'
MF	8	Saiful Ridzuwan Selamat		(substituted on) 75'
Coach:
(Malaysia) Ong Kim Swee

GK	12	Ramos Maxanches
DF	3	Jorge Sabas Victor	(yellow card) 65'
DF	4	Filipe Oliveira	(yellow card) 44'	(substituted off) 46'
DF	15	Agostinho
MF	16	Paulo Helber
MF	13	Carlos Magno
MF	14	Frangcyatma Alves
MF	23	José Fonseca		(substituted off) 62'
MF	10	Nilo Soares		(substituted off) 46'
FW	6	Anggisu Barbosa (c)
FW	9	Jairo Neto
Substitutions:
DF	2	Ezequiel Fernandes		(substituted on) 46'
MF	11	Nataniel Reis		(substituted on) 46'
FW	19	Feliciano Goncalves		(substituted on) 62'
Coach:
(Brazil) Fábio Magrão

Assistant referees:
Goh Gek Pheng Jeffrey (Singapore)
Saparmammet Gurbanov (Turkmenistan)
Fourth official:
Awni Abdel Karim Said Hassouneh (Jordan)

== Brunei vs Laos ==
Laos dominated the early stages of the game with their play-makers Khonesavanh Sihavong and Soukaphone Vongchiengkham causing the Bruneian defence all sorts of problems. In only the eleventh minute when the former found Phoutthasay Khochalern outside the box who unleashed a well place shot to score the first goal of the game. Despite the early dominance by Laos, Brunei grew into the game and had several good opportunities fall to their captain and former Arsenal and Chelsea academy player Faiq Jefri Bolkiah. In the 19th minute he dribbled past two defenders to see his shot go just wide, while three minutes later the Laotian goalkeeper had to be alert to his well placed free-kick. Faiq Jefri was desperately unlucky in the 32nd minute when his fine run and shot had Soukthavy Soundala beaten but his effort rebounded off the post. It was Laos' turn to hit the word work ten minutes later with Sihavong and Soukaphone coming well again but the former's effort coming back of the underside of the crossbar. In the 55th minute Bruneian goalkeeper Ahsanuddin had to make a fantastic one handed save from Phoutthasay's long range effort, and again ten minutes later from Khouanta Sivongthong. Brunei finally got their equaliser in the 67th minute when a quick counterattack ended with Azwan Ali Rahman placing a shot into the top corner. Parity would only last seven minutes though as Soukchinda Natphasouk got behind the Bruneian defence to turn in Soukaphone's low cross. The Laotians held on for the win in a fine match.

31 May
20:30

Brunei	1–2	Laos
Azwan 68'		Khochalern 11'; Natphasouk 74'

Bishan Stadium, Bishan
Referee: Ma Ning (China)

GK	1	Md Ahsanuddin Hj Md Dani
DF	4	Khairil Shahme Suhaimi	(yellow card) 48'
DF	5	Suhaimi Anak Sulau
DF	22	Mohd Azri Zahari
DF	24	Hanif Hamir
MF	3	Mohd Asnawi Syazni Aziz
MF	10	Nur Ikhmal Damit
MF	11	Md Aminuddin Zakwan Tahir
MF	20	Muhd Saiful Ammar Hj Adis		(substituted off) 46'
MF	27	Azwan Ali Rahman
FW	9	Faiq Jefri Bolkiah (c)
Substitutions:
FW	21	Mohd Shafie Hj Mohd Effendy	(yellow card) 52'	(substituted on) 46'
Coach:
(Singapore) Stephen Ng Heng Seng

GK	18	Soukthavy Soundala
DF	12	Thenthong Phonsettha
DF	19	Sengdao Inthilath
DF	2	Thinnakone Vongsa
MF	14	Soukchinda Natphasouk		(substituted off) 83'
MF	21	Tiny Bounmalay (c)
MF	15	Phoutthasay Khochalern		(substituted off) 61'
MF	17	Vilayuth Sayyabounsou
MF	11	Maitee Sihalath	(yellow card) 38'
MF	10	Soukaphone Vongchiengkham
FW	7	Khonesavanh Sihavong		(substituted off) 73'
Substitutions:
DF	20	Khouanta Sivongthong		(substituted on) 61'
FW	26	Lembo Saysana		(substituted on) 73'
FW	23	Xaysongkham Champathong	(yellow card) 88'	(substituted on) 83'
Coach:
(England) Dave Booth

Assistant referees:
Saparmammet Gurbanov (Turkmenistan)
Ahmed Ferdous (Bangladesh)
Fourth official:
Foo Chuan Hui (Singapore)

== Thailand vs Timor-Leste ==
A surprisingly resolute Timorese side managed to stem a Thai attack that had scored six in the previous game. Thailand should have taken the lead in the 41st minute when Sarach Yooyen's free-kick was parried by Ramos Maxanches, but only a few yards out with no pressure and the whole goal to aim at Nurul Sriyankem somehow managed to blast his shot way over. Thailand finally were able to capitalise on their vast dominance a minute before half-time as Chanathip Songkrasin's decisive pass was composedly finished by Rungrath Poomchantuek. In the second half Thailand had a great opportunity to double their lead when they were awarded a penalty kick after Nurul was tripped in the box in the 54th minute. Chananan Pombuppha had scored four in his previous game and was given the responsibility but Maxanches dove low to his right to save the shot. Timor-Leste defended well but offered little in attack as Thailand won by the single goal.

1 June
20:30

Thailand	1–0	Timor-Leste
Rungrath 44'	Report

Bishan Stadium, Bishan
Referee: Aziz Asimov (Uzbekistan)

GK	1	Chanin Sae-Eae
DF	2	Peerapat Notechaiya		(substituted off) 46'
DF	8	Artit Daosawang
DF	13	Narubadin Weerawatnodom
DF	17	Tanaboon Kesarat
MF	12	Nurul Sriyankem	(yellow card) 28'
MF	6	Sarach Yooyen (c)
MF	29	Rungrath Poomchantuek
MF	7	Thitipan Puangchan		(substituted off) 80'
MF	18	Chanathip Songkrasin
FW	23	Chananan Pombuppha		(substituted off) 70'
Substitutions:
DF	3	Suriya Singmui		(substituted on) 46'
FW	22	Chenrop Samphaodi		(substituted on) 70'
MF	4	Chaowat Veerachat		(substituted on) 80'
Coach:
(Thailand) Choketawee Promrut

GK	12	Ramos Maxanches
DF	2	Ezequiel Fernandes
DF	4	Filipe Oliveira
DF	15	Agostinho
DF	18	Candido Oliveira
MF	11	Nataniel Reis
MF	10	Nilo Soares		(substituted off) 78'
FW	5	Henrique Cruz		(substituted off) 23'
FW	6	Anggisu Barbosa (c)
FW	19	Feliciano Goncalves	(yellow card) 41'
FW	9	Jairo Neto		(substituted off) 65'
Substitutions:
MF	14	Frangcyatma Alves		(substituted on) 23'
MF	23	José Fonseca		(substituted on) 65'
DF	17	Nidio Neto		(substituted on) 78'
Coach:
(Brazil) Fábio Magrão

Assistant referees:
Alisher Usmanov (Uzbekistan)
Ghulam Abbas (Kuwait)
Fourth official:
Yousef Al-Marzouq (Kuwait)

== Vietnam vs Malaysia ==
Malaysia started strongly and could have scored in the first minute, goaltender Phí Minh Long having to produce a one-handed save to keep D. Saarvindran's free-kick from finding the back of the net. Võ Huy Toàn had a goal disallowed for offsides, but Vietnam opened the scoring five minutes later as Công Phượng was fouled in the box by Adam Nor Azlin and Mạc Hồng Quân scored from the resulting penalty kick. Công Phượng grabbed Vietnam's second goal just before hald time as he slotted Hồ Ngọc Thắng's pass into the bottom corner. Công Phượng was tormenting the Malaysian defence and won another penalty kick just moments into the second half as he was fouled by Mohd Farhan Abu Bakar this time, with Huy Toàn given the responsibilities and scoring. Incredibly only six minutes later Vietnam would score again, Công Phượng with a great free-kick into the top corner. Malaysia finally restored some pride as Nurridzuan Abu Hassan found space in the Vietnamese defence to cross for Syahrul Azwari Ibrahim to score. With ten minutes to go Vietnam restored their four-goal lead when Nguyễn Văn Toàn chipping the ball over Abu Bakar who was off his goal-line to cap off a resounding performance.

2 June
20:30

Vietnam	5–1	Malaysia
Mạc Hồng Quân 15' (pen.); Nguyễn Công Phượng 45+1', 53'; Võ Huy Toàn 47' (pen.); Nguyễn Văn Toàn 80'		Syahrul 78'

Bishan Stadium, Bishan
Referee: Turki Al-Khudair (Saudi Arabia)

GK	27	Phí Minh Long
DF	6	Nguyễn Minh Tùng		(substituted off) 56'
DF	26	Bùi Tiến Dũng
DF	15	Quế Ngọc Hải (c)
DF	22	Nguyễn Thanh Hiền
MF	2	Nguyễn Hữu Dũng	(yellow card) 36'
MF	11	Đỗ Duy Mạnh
MF	25	Võ Huy Toàn
MF	18	Hồ Ngọc Thắng		(substituted off) 72'
FW	17	Mạc Hồng Quân	(yellow card) 90+3'
FW	10	Nguyễn Công Phượng		(substituted off) 67'
Substitutions:
DF	12	Vũ Ngọc Thịnh		(substituted on) 56'
FW	20	Trần Phi Sơn		(substituted on) 67'
FW	19	Nguyễn Văn Toàn		(substituted on) 72'
Coach:
(Japan) Toshiya Miura

GK	1	Mohd Farhan Abu Bakar	(yellow card) 46'
DF	29	Matthew Davies
DF	26	Mohd Amer Saidin
DF	25	Adam Nor Azlin
DF	17	Mohd Fandi Othman (c)
MF	12	Gary Steven Robbat	(yellow card) 23'	(substituted off) 73'
MF	16	Nurridzuan Abu Hassan
MF	28	Amirul Hisyam Kechik	(yellow card) 80'
MF	6	D. Saarvindran		(substituted off) 58'
MF	8	Saiful Ridzuwan Selamat		(substituted off) 46'
FW	9	Mohd Syafiq Ahmad	(yellow card) 42'
Substitutions:
MF	18	Syahrul Azwari Ibrahim		(substituted on) 46'
MF	19	Muhamad Faizat Mohd Ghazli		(substituted on) 58'
DF	24	Ariff Farhan Isa		(substituted on) 73'
Coach:
(Malaysia) Ong Kim Swee

Assistant referees:
Mohammed Al-Abakry (Saudi Arabia)
Saoud Ahmed Al-Maqaleh (Qatar)
Fourth official:
Khamis Mohamed Al-Kuwari (Qatar)

== Timor-Leste vs Brunei ==
Brunei missed an excellent chance early on in the game as Md Aminuddin Zakwan Tahir's cross found Mohd Asnawi Syazni Aziz who could only head straight at Timorese goaltender Ramos Maxanches from point-blank range. They would come to rue that miss in the 24th minute as Jairo Neto slotted Nidio Neto through ball through the Bruneian goalkeeper's to open the scoring. Brunei found a way back in the 68th minute as Asnawi was fouled in the box by Maxanches. Captain Faiq Jefri Bolkiah took the responsibility and confidently smashed the penalty kick home to equalise. However just as in the previous game Brunei conceded again six minutes after equalising, from just outside the box the other Brazilian-born Timorese player in the squad Paulo Helber stole the ball from Muhd Saiful Ammar Hj Adis and unleashed a powerful effort and although Md Ahsanuddin Hj Md Dani got both hands to the shot he could not keep it out.

3 June
20:30

Timor-Leste	2–1	Brunei
Neto 24'; Helber 74'	Report	Faiq 68' (pen.)

Bishan Stadium, Bishan
Referee: Khamis Al-Kuwari (Qatar)

GK	12	Ramos Maxanches
DF	2	Ezequiel Fernandes
DF	3	Jorge Sabas Victor
DF	4	Filipe Oliveira	(yellow card) 77'
MF	17	Nidio Neto		(substituted off) 75'
DF	18	Candido Oliveira		(substituted off) 46'
MF	16	Paulo Helber		(substituted off) 90+1'
MF	23	José Fonseca
MF	11	Nataniel Reis
FW	6	Anggisu Barbosa (c)
FW	9	Jairo Neto
Substitutions:
DF	15	Agostinho		(substituted on) 46'
FW	19	Feliciano Goncalves		(substituted on) 75'
MF	10	Nilo Soares		(substituted on) 90+1'
Coach:
(Brazil) Fábio Magrão

GK	1	Md Ahsanuddin Hj Md Dani
DF	4	Khairil Shahme Suhaimi
DF	5	Suhaimi Anak Sulau
DF	22	Mohd Azri Zahari
DF	24	Hanif Hamir	(yellow card) 46'
MF	3	Mohd Asnawi Syazni Aziz		(substituted off) 70'
MF	8	Ak Yura Indera Putera Pg Yunos		(substituted off) 86'
MF	10	Nur Ikhmal Damit
MF	11	Md Aminuddin Zakwan Tahir		(substituted off) 83'
MF	27	Azwan Ali Rahman
FW	9	Faiq Jefri Bolkiah (c)
Substitutions:
MF	20	Muhd Saiful Ammar Hj Adis		(substituted on) 70'
FW	21	Mohd Shafie Hj Mohd Effendy		(substituted on) 83'
MF	19	Ak Mohd Abd Halim Pg Hj Hassan		(substituted on) 86'
Coach:
(Singapore) Stephen Ng Heng Seng

Assistant referees:
Saoud Ahmed Al-Maqaleh (Qatar)
Saparmammet Gurbanov (Turkmenistan)
Fourth official:
Hiroyuki Kimura (Japan)

== Malaysia vs Thailand ==
The match started at a frenetic pace as with in the first ten minutes Chanathip Songkrasin and Chananan Pombuppha had efforts go just wide. Malaysia too had their chances as a swift counterattack in the 14th minute saw captain Gary Steven Robbat racing towards goal but he shot wide under pressure from Narubadin Weerawatnodom. In the 27th minute Narubadin put in a great cross for the unmarked Thitipan Puangchan right in front off the goal but he somehow headed wide. Narubadin's crosses were troubling the Malaysians and it caused problems again in the 53rd minute as he crossed for Rungrath Poomchantuek and last ditch challenge was needed by Mohd Amer Saidin to prevent the latter from scoring. Malaysia almost took the lead five minutes later when Syahrul Azwari Ibrahim cut inside his defender and unleashed a tremendous curling effort destined for the top corner which Thai goalkeeper Chanin Sae-Eae had to be at full stretch to keep out. Thailand had an even better chance themselves in the 68th minute when Mohd Farhan Abu Bakar had to dive down low to keep Tanaboon Kesarat's long range effort out, and the rebound was pounced upon by Chananan but his shot was deflected by a Malaysian defender for a corner. But a goal did come nine minutes from time as Tristan Do passed to his captain Sarach Yooyen who from just outside the box unleashed a powerful left-footed effort that gave the Malaysian goalkeeper no chance. Thailand could have even scored another when Nurul Sriyankem was one-on-one with the goalkeeper but Abu Bakar managed to make the block. Nonetheless Thailand held on through six minutes of additional time to confirm the win.

4 June
16:00

Malaysia	0–1	Thailand
		Sarach 81'

Bishan Stadium, Bishan
Referee: Ma Ning (China)

GK	1	Mohd Farhan Abu Bakar
DF	3	Mohd Shahrul Mohd Saad	(yellow card) 61'
DF	21	Nazirul Naim Che Hashim
DF	29	Matthew Davies
DF	26	Mohd Amer Saidin
DF	24	Ariff Farhan Isa		(substituted off) 81'
MF	12	Gary Steven Robbat (c)
MF	16	Nurridzuan Abu Hassan		(substituted off) 85'
MF	28	Amirul Hisyam Kechik
MF	6	D. Saarvindran		(substituted off) 57'
FW	18	Syahrul Azwari Ibrahim
Substitutions:
MF	19	Muhamad Faizat Mohd Ghazli	(yellow card) 90+6'	(substituted on) 57'
FW	20	S. Kumaahran		(substituted on) 81'
DF	17	Mohd Fandi Othman		(substituted on) 85'
Coach:
(Malaysia) Ong Kim Swee

GK	1	Chanin Sae-Eae
DF	3	Suriya Singmui		(substituted off) 69'
DF	8	Artit Daosawang
DF	13	Narubadin Weerawatnodom	(yellow card) 60'
DF	17	Tanaboon Kesarat	(yellow card) 76'
MF	12	Nurul Sriyankem
MF	6	Sarach Yooyen (c)
MF	7	Thitipan Puangchan		(substituted off) 76'
MF	18	Chanathip Songkrasin
MF	29	Rungrath Poomchantuek		(substituted off) 58'
FW	23	Chananan Pombuppha
Substitutions:
MF	11	Pinyo Inpinit	(yellow card) 87'	(substituted on) 58'
DF	19	Tristan Do		(substituted on) 69'
MF	4	Chaowat Veerachat		(substituted on) 76'
Coach:
(Thailand) Choketawee Promrut

Assistant referees:
Goh Gek Pheng Jeffrey (Singapore)
Park Sang-jun (South Korea)
Fourth official:
Kim Hee-gon(South Korea)

== Vietnam vs Laos ==
4 June
20:30

Vietnam	1–0	Laos
Nguyễn Thanh Hiền 65'

Bishan Stadium, Bishan
Referee: Hiroyuki Kimura (Japan)

GK	27	Phí Minh Long
DF	3	Phạm Mạnh Hùng	(yellow card) 63'
DF	15	Quế Ngọc Hải (c)
DF	12	Vũ Ngọc Thịnh
MF	23	Phạm Đức Huy
MF	2	Nguyễn Hữu Dũng		(substituted off) 23'
MF	14	Nguyễn Huy Hùng
MF	16	Lê Thanh Bình		(substituted off) 46'
FW	20	Trần Phi Sơn
FW	19	Nguyễn Văn Toàn
FW	10	Nguyễn Công Phượng	(yellow card) 72'	(substituted off) 90+2'
Substitutions:
DF	22	Nguyễn Thanh Hiền		(substituted on) 23'
FW	17	Mạc Hồng Quân		(substituted on) 46'
DF	26	Bùi Tiến Dũng		(substituted on) 90+2'
Coach:
(Japan) Toshiya Miura

GK	1	Vathana Keodouangdeth
DF	13	Bounthavy Sipasong
DF	19	Sengdao Inthilath
DF	2	Thinnakone Vongsa
MF	21	Tiny Bounmalay (c)
MF	15	Phoutthasay Khochalern
MF	8	Keoviengphet Liththideth	(yellow card) 55'	(substituted off) 87'
MF	11	Maitee Sihalath
MF	10	Soukaphone Vongchiengkham		(substituted off) 77'
FW	9	Sitthideth Khanthavong		(substituted off) 46'
FW	16	Sinnalone Sihalath
Substitutions:
FW	7	Khonesavanh Sihavong		(substituted on) 46'
MF	17	Vilayuth Sayyabounsou		(substituted on) 77'
DF	20	Khouanta Sivongthong		(substituted on) 87'
Coach:
(England) Dave Booth

Assistant referees:
Satoshi Karakami (Japan)
Alisher Usmanov (Uzbekistan)
Fourth official:
Aziz Asimov (Uzbekistan)

== Thailand vs Brunei ==
Thailand fielded a starting line-up mostly of reserves against Brunei but still dominated the match and they scored in the 19th minute as Chenrop Samphaodi latched onto Thitipan Puangchan's through pass and slotted past the onrushing Bruneian goalkeeper. Chenrop would score again thirteen minutes later as he was completely unmarked to head in Chaowat Veerachat's cross. Rungrath Poomchantuek had a goal disallowed for offsides three minutes before that, but Thailand kept attacking and where rewarded with another goal six minutes after the break when Pakorn Prempak taped a free-kick to Thitipan who blasted the shot into the net. Tristan Do was next to score as the defender stole the ball from Suhaimi Anak Sulau and proceeded to shoot past Md Ahsanuddin Hj Md Dani although the Bruneian goalkeeper probably could have done better. He himself was injured on the play and had to be substituted, but his replacement Md Nur Syazwan Halidi could not stop another substitute Nurul Sriyankem from scoring in stoppage time as Thailand made it five. The result also guarantied Thailand would advance out of the group.

6 June
20:30

Thailand	5–0	Brunei
Chenrop 19', 31'; Thitipan 53'; Tristan 71'; Nurul 90+4'

Bishan Stadium, Bishan
Referee: Aziz Asimov (Uzbekistan)

GK	20	Somporn Yos
DF	3	Suriya Singmui
DF	5	Adisorn Promrak (c)
DF	19	Tristan Do	(yellow card) 26'
MF	4	Chaowat Veerachat
MF	17	Tanaboon Kesarat
MF	14	Pakorn Prempak
MF	7	Thitipan Puangchan		(substituted off) 73'
MF	24	Siwakorn Jakkuprasat	(yellow card) 14'
MF	29	Rungrath Poomchantuek
FW	22	Chenrop Samphaodi		(substituted off) 63'
Substitutions:
MF	11	Pinyo Inpinit		(substituted on) 63'
MF	12	Nurul Sriyankem		(substituted on) 73'
Coach:
(Thailand) Choketawee Promrut

GK	1	Md Ahsanuddin Hj Md Dani	(substituted off) 73'
DF	2	Mohd Nur Azees Awang Ali
DF	4	Khairil Shahme Suhaimi
DF	5	Suhaimi Anak Sulau
DF	12	Mohd Aman Hj Abd Rahim
DF	24	Hanif Hamir
DF	25	Mohd Rakin Ramli
MF	18	Muhammad Nadzri Hj Erwan	(substituted off) 69'
MF	19	Ak Mohd Abd Halim Pg Hj Hassan
FW	21	Mohd Shafie Hj Mohd Effendy
FW	9	Faiq Jefri Bolkiah (c)	(substituted off) 46'
Substitutions:
FW	29	Md Nur Syazwan Halidi	(substituted on) 46'
MF	8	Ak Yura Indera Putera Pg Yunos	(substituted on) 69'
GK	30	Abdul Hafiz Abdul Rahim	(substituted on) 73'
Coach:
(Singapore) Stephen Ng Heng Seng

Assistant referees:
Alisher Usmanov (Uzbekistan)
Saparmammet Gurbanov (Turkmenistan)
Fourth official:
Ma Ning (China)

== Timor-Leste vs Vietnam ==
Vietnam opened the scoring in the twelfth minute as Trần Phi Sơn headed in a cross from his captain Quế Ngọc Hải. The Timorese defence managed to keep the score at one nil for the rest of the first half, but five minutes into the second Mạc Hồng Quân headed in another goal, again from a Ngọc Hải cross. The Full-back then got himself on the score sheet seven minutes later as his shot from an acute angle rebounded off the far post and into the net. Vietnam where dominating and just three minutes later they scored their fourth goal; Ramos Maxanches managed to save Lê Thanh Bình's initial effort, but the rebound fell right to Võ Huy Toàn who smashed the ball in. The result saw Vietnam join Thailand in the semi-finals with a game to spare while in the process eliminating the other teams in the group.

7 June
20:30

Timor-Leste	0–4	Vietnam
	Report	Trần Phi Sơn 12'; Mạc Hồng Quân 50'; Quế Ngọc Hải 57'; Võ Huy Toàn 61'

Bishan Stadium, Bishan
Referee: Kim Hee-gon (South Korea)

GK	12	Ramos Maxanches
DF	2	Ezequiel Fernandes
DF	3	Jorge Sabas Victor
DF	18	Candido Oliveira
MF	13	Carlos Magno	(substituted off) 46'
MF	16	Paulo Helber
MF	23	José Fonseca (c)
MF	10	Nilo Soares	(substituted off) 46'
MF	11	Nataniel Reis
FW	19	Feliciano Goncalves	(substituted off) 46'
FW	9	Jairo Neto
Substitutions:
DF	15	Agostinho	(substituted on) 46'
MF	14	Frangcyatma Alves	(substituted on) 46'
MF	17	Nidio Neto	(substituted on) 46'
Coach:
(Brazil) Fábio Magrão

GK	27	Phí Minh Long
DF	12	Vũ Ngọc Thịnh
DF	26	Bùi Tiến Dũng
DF	15	Quế Ngọc Hải (c)
MF	23	Phạm Đức Huy
MF	14	Nguyễn Huy Hùng
MF	11	Đỗ Duy Mạnh		(substituted off) 72'
MF	25	Võ Huy Toàn	(yellow card) 39'
MF	18	Hồ Ngọc Thắng		(substituted off) 63'
FW	17	Mạc Hồng Quân		(substituted off) 57'
FW	20	Trần Phi Sơn
Substitutions:
FW	16	Lê Thanh Bình	(yellow card) 66'	(substituted on) 57'
FW	19	Nguyễn Văn Toàn		(substituted on) 63'
DF	3	Phạm Mạnh Hùng		(substituted on) 72'
Coach:
(Japan) Toshiya Miura

Assistant referees:
Park Sang-jun (South Korea)
Mohammad Reza Mansouri (Iran)
Fourth official:
Mo'ud Bonyadifard (Iran)

== Brunei vs Malaysia ==
Malaysia won 2-0 against their neighbours although it was a match with only pride to play for as both teams were already eliminated. In the 74th minute Nurridzuan Abu Hassan's long range free-kick took an awkward bounce to nestle in the far corner, and only six minutes Malaysia scored a second to wrap up the win as Adam Nor Azlin pounced on a rebound as the Bruneian goalkeeper could not hold on the initial shot

8 June
20:30

Brunei	0–2	Malaysia
	Report	Nurridzuan 71'; Adam Nor 77'

Bishan Stadium, Bishan
Referee: Mo'ud Bonyadifard (Iran)

GK	1	Md Ahsanuddin Hj Md Dani
DF	5	Suhaimi Anak Sulau
DF	22	Mohd Azri Zahari	(yellow card) 8'
DF	24	Hanif Hamir		(substituted off) 83'
DF	25	Mohd Rakin Ramli
MF	3	Mohd Asnawi Syazni Aziz
MF	8	Ak Yura Indera Putera Pg Yunos
MF	10	Nur Ikhmal Damit
MF	11	Md Aminuddin Zakwan Tahir		(substituted off) 76'
MF	27	Azwan Ali Rahman
FW	9	Faiq Jefri Bolkiah (c)		(substituted off) 81'
Substitutions:
FW	21	Mohd Shafie Hj Mohd Effendy		(substituted on) 76'
FW	29	Md Nur Syazwan Halidi	(yellow card) 87'	(substituted on) 81'
DF	4	Khairil Shahme Suhaimi		(substituted on) 83'
Coach:
(Singapore) Stephen Ng Heng Seng

GK	1	Mohd Farhan Abu Bakar
DF	3	Mohd Shahrul Mohd Saad
DF	21	Nazirul Naim Che Hashim
DF	24	Ariff Farhan Isa
DF	25	Adam Nor Azlin	(yellow card) 4'
DF	17	Mohd Fandi Othman (c)		(substituted off) 69'
MF	12	Gary Steven Robbat		(substituted off) 56'
MF	28	Amirul Hisyam Kechik
MF	18	Syahrul Azwari Ibrahim
MF	19	Muhamad Faizat Mohd Ghazli
FW	20	S. Kumaahran		(substituted off) 60'
Substitutions:
MF	8	Saiful Ridzuwan Selamat		(substituted on) 56'
MF	16	Nurridzuan Abu Hassan		(substituted on) 60'
FW	9	Muhammad Syafiq Ahmad		(substituted on) 69'
Coach:
(Malaysia) Ong Kim Swee

Assistant referees:
Mohammad Reza Mansouri (Iran)
Satoshi Karakami (Japan)
Fourth official:
Kim Hee-gon (South Korea)

== Timor-Leste vs Laos ==
9 June
20:30

Timor-Leste	2–3	Laos
Alves 22'; Martins 90+1'	Report	Sipasong 27'; Khochalern 47'; Sihavong 67'

Bishan Stadium, Bishan
Referee: Turki Al-Khudair (Saudi Arabia)

GK	1	Exposto Gusmao
DF	2	Ezequiel Fernandes
DF	3	Jorge Sabas Victor
DF	4	Filipe Oliveira	(yellow card) 90+2'
MF	17	Nidio Neto	(yellow card) 69'
MF	16	Paulo Helber	(yellow card) 64'	(substituted off) 72'
MF	13	Carlos Magno		(substituted off) 46'
MF	10	Nilo Soares (c)		(substituted off) 61'
FW	5	Henrique Cruz
FW	14	Frangcyatma Alves	(yellow card) 89'
FW	19	Feliciano Goncalves
Substitutions:
MF	8	José Oliveira		(substituted on) 46'
MF	11	Nataniel Reis		(substituted on) 61'
FW	6	Anggisu Barbosa		(substituted on) 72'
Coach:
(Brazil) Fábio Magrão

GK	18	Soukthavy Soundala
DF	13	Bounthavy Sipasong
DF	19	Sengdao Inthilath
DF	2	Thinnakone Vongsa	(yellow card) 16'
MF	14	Soukchinda Natphasouk	(yellow card) 51'	(substituted off) 88'
MF	21	Tiny Bounmalay (c)		(substituted off) 66'
MF	15	Phoutthasay Khochalern
MF	11	Maitee Sihalath
MF	10	Soukaphone Vongchiengkham		(substituted off) 60'
MF	8	Keoviengphet Liththideth
FW	16	Sinnalone Sihalath	(yellow card) 82'
Substitutions:
FW	7	Khonesavanh Sihavong		(substituted on) 60'
MF	17	Vilayuth Sayyabounsou		(substituted on) 66'
FW	26	Lembo Saysana		(substituted on) 88'
Coach:
(England) Dave Booth

Assistant referees:
Mohammed Al-Abakry (Saudi Arabia)
Saparmammet Gurbanov (Turkmenistan)
Fourth official:
Ma Ning (China)

== Vietnam vs Thailand ==
Both teams were already qualified for the knockout round, and as expected a few key players such as Quế Ngọc Hải and Nguyễn Công Phượng of Vietnam and Chanathip Songkrasin and Sarach Yooyen of Thailand not included in the starting line-ups. Nonetheless there was still plenty to play for as the winner would top the group and both teams played a fast-paced, physical, and attacking game. Chananan Pombuppha had two great chances in the opening twenty minutes but on both occasions his effort was wide. Chananan redeemed himself in the 22nd minute as it was his pass that set up Pakorn Prempak to score the opening goal from an acute angle. Pakorn could have had a second eight minutes later when this time Chaowat Veerachat with the pass but the former's shot was straight at Vietnamese goalkeeper Phạm Văn Tiến. Just moments latter Vietnam had the chance to equalise but Phạm Mạnh Hùng's cross to the unmarked Đỗ Duy Mạnh was headed wide. In similar circumstances before the end of the half Trần Phi Sơn, whose pace and skill caused Thailand all sorts of problems, found Lê Thanh Bình with a great pass, but although the former was again unmarked he too headed off target. Thailand thought they had doubled their advantage in the 51st minute when Chaowat passed it to Chananan only for the latter to see his effort come off the woodwork. Nonetheless they would get their second when Pakorn who was adjudged to have been fouled in the box by Bùi Tiến Dũng. Thitipan Puangchan took the responsibility and calmly scored the penalty kick. With sixteen minutes to go Thanh Bình was denied by a sliding challenge from Thai captain Adisorn Promrak, and three minutes later it was three for Thailand as Tristan Do managed to turn the defender marking him before unleashing a powerful curling shot perfectly placed in the top corner. in the last minute of the game Vietnam would grab a consolation goal as Thanh Bình turned and volleyed a pass in spectacular style to make some amends for the chances he missed earlier in the game, as Thailand conceded their first goal of the tournament but still topped the group in an entertaining game.

10 June
20:30

Vietnam	1–3	Thailand
Lê Thanh Bình 90'	Report	Pakorn 22'; Thitipan 63' (pen.); Tristan 77'

Bishan Stadium, Bishan
Referee: Yousef Al-Marzouq (Kuwait)

GK	1	Phạm Văn Tiến
DF	3	Phạm Mạnh Hùng (c)
DF	12	Vũ Ngọc Thịnh
DF	22	Nguyễn Thanh Hiền
DF	26	Bùi Tiến Dũng	(yellow card) 62'	(substituted off) 72'
MF	23	Phạm Đức Huy
MF	14	Nguyễn Huy Hùng		(substituted off) 78'
MF	16	Lê Thanh Bình
MF	11	Đỗ Duy Mạnh		(substituted off) 62'
FW	19	Nguyễn Văn Toàn
FW	20	Trần Phi Sơn
Substitutions:
DF	6	Nguyễn Minh Tùng		(substituted on) 62'
MF	18	Hồ Ngọc Thắng		(substituted on) 72'
FW	10	Nguyễn Công Phượng		(substituted on) 78'
Coach:
(Japan) Toshiya Miura

GK	1	Chanin Sae-Eae
DF	5	Adisorn Promrak (c)
DF	2	Peerapat Notechaiya		(substituted off) 46'
DF	19	Tristan Do
DF	8	Artit Daosawang
MF	4	Chaowat Veerachat
MF	7	Thitipan Puangchan	(yellow card) 79'
MF	14	Pakorn Prempak		(substituted off) 79'
MF	24	Siwakorn Jakkuprasat
MF	11	Pinyo Inpinit		(substituted off) 68'
FW	23	Chananan Pombuppha
Substitutions:
DF	3	Suriya Singmui		(substituted on) 46'
MF	29	Rungrath Poomchantuek		(substituted on) 68'
FW	22	Chenrop Samphaodi		(substituted on) 79'
Coach:
(Thailand) Choketawee Promrut

Assistant referees:
Saparmammet Gurbanov (Turkmenistan)
Ghulam Abbas (Kuwait)
Fourth official:
Mo'ud Bonyadifard (Iran)

== Laos vs Malaysia ==
11 June
20:30

Laos	1–3	Malaysia
Natphasouk 22'	Report	Syafiq 42'; Saiful 71'; Syahrul 81'

Bishan Stadium, Bishan
Referee: Khamis Al-Kuwari (Qatar)

GK	18	Soukthavy Soundala
DF	12	Thenthong Phonsettha
DF	2	Thinnakone Vongsa
MF	14	Soukchinda Natphasouk		(substituted off) 84'
MF	21	Tiny Bounmalay (c)
MF	15	Phoutthasay Khochalern
MF	11	Maitee Sihalath
MF	8	Keoviengphet Liththideth
MF	10	Soukaphone Vongchiengkham		(substituted off) 77'
FW	7	Khonesavanh Sihavong		(substituted off) 67'
FW	16	Sinnalone Sihalath
Substitutions:
MF	17	Vilayuth Sayyabounsou		(substituted on) 67'
FW	9	Sitthideth Khanthavong		(substituted on) 77'
FW	23	Xaysongkham Champathong	(yellow card) 84'	(substituted on) 84'
Coach:
(England) Dave Booth

GK	1	Mohd Farhan Abu Bakar
DF	3	Mohd Shahrul Mohd Saad
DF	29	Matthew Davies
DF	26	Mohd Amer Saidin	(yellow card) 66'
DF	17	Mohd Fandi Othman (c)
MF	12	Gary Steven Robbat
MF	16	Nurridzuan Abu Hassan		(substituted off) 62'
MF	18	Syahrul Azwari Ibrahim
MF	19	Muhamad Faizat Mohd Ghazli		(substituted off) 90+1'
MF	8	Saiful Ridzuwan Selamat
FW	9	Mohd Syafiq Ahmad		(substituted off) 75'
Substitutions:
DF	21	Nazirul Naim Che Hashim		(substituted on) 62'
DF	24	Ariff Farhan Isa		(substituted on) 75'
DF	5	Mohd Syazwan Tajudin		(substituted on) 90+1'
Coach:
(Malaysia) Ong Kim Swee

Assistant referees:
Ghulam Abbas (Kuwait)
Ahmed Ferdous (Bangladesh)
Fourth official:
Hiroyuki Kimura (Japan)
