= Timor-Leste national football team records and statistics =

The following table summarizes the all-time record for the Timor-Leste men's national football team. Timor-Leste has played matches against 16 current and former national teams, with the latest result, a loss, coming against Philippines on July 16, 2022.

As of 30 September 2026

Team	Pld	W	D	L	GF	GA	GD	WPCT
Brunei	14	6	1	7	22	26	−4	42.86
Cambodia	12	1	3	8	20	30	−10	8.33
Chinese Taipei	6	0	0	6	3	17	−14	0.00
Hong Kong	2	0	0	2	3	11	−8	0.00
Indonesia	7	0	0	7	2	24	−22	0.00
Laos	7	1	0	6	9	18	−9	14.29
Lebanon	1	0	0	1	0	4	−4	0.00
Malaysia	8	0	1	7	5	25	−20	0.00
Maldives	2	1	0	1	2	2	0	50.00
Mongolia	4	3	0	1	9	4	+5	75.00
Myanmar	5	0	1	4	2	9	−7	0.00
Nepal	4	0	2	2	3	9	−6	0.00
Palestine	2	0	1	1	1	8	−7	0.00
Philippines	9	1	0	8	6	33	−27	11.11
Saudi Arabia	2	0	0	2	0	17	−17	0.00
Singapore	4	0	0	4	1	13	−12	0.00
Sri Lanka	1	0	0	1	2	3	−1	0.00
Thailand	4	0	0	4	0	27	−27	0.00
Tajikistan	2	0	0	2	0	6	−6	0.00
United Arab Emirates	2	0	0	2	0	9	−9	0.00
Vietnam	1	0	0	1	0	7	−7	0.00
Total	99	13	9	77	90	302	−212	13.13

Source: Results

== Individual records ==
=== Player records ===
As of 14 December 2021
Players in bold are still active with Timor-Leste.

=== Most capped players ===
Rank	Player	Caps	Goals	Career
1	Anggisu Barbosa	30	4	2008–2016
2	**Adelino Trindade**	27	3	2010–present
3	José Fonseca	26	0	2010–2017
4	**Henrique Cruz**	25	3	2015–present
5	**Nataniel Reis**	23	1	2014–present
6	Eusebio de Almeida	22	0	2007–2015
7	**Rufino Gama**	21	7	2016–present
7	**Nelson Viegas**	21	1	2016-Present
9	Filipe Oliveira	20	0	2014–2017
9	Ramos Maxanches	20	0	2014–2016

=== Top goalscorers ===
Rank	Player	Goals	Caps	Ratio	Career
1	**Rufino Gama**	7	21	0.33	2016–present
2	Murilo de Almeida	6	7	0.86	2012–2014
3	Quito	4	15	0.27	2010–2016
3	Anggisu Barbosa	4	30	0.13	2008–2016
5	Adélio Guterres	3	4	0.75	2006–2007
5	Alan Leandro	3	5	0.6	2012
5	Emilio da Silva	3	12	0.25	2004–2012
5	**Henrique Cruz**	3	25	0.12	2015–present
5	**Adelino Trindade**	3	27	0.11	2010–present
10	**João Pedro**	2	10	0.2	2018–present
10	Patrick Fabiano	2	9	0.22	2014–2015
10	**Silveiro Garcia**	2	12	0.17	2016–present
10	Ramon Saro	2	14	0.14	2012–2016
10	José João Pereira	2	15	0.13	2004–2011

=== Most capped goalkeepers ===
Rank	Player	Caps	Goals	Career
1	**Ramos Maxanches**	19	0	2012–present
2	Adi	14	0	2003–2016
3	**Aderito Raul Fernandes**	13	0	2015–present
4	**Fagio Augusto**	7	0	2015–present
5	**Junildo Pereira**	6	0	2021-present
6	Leonel da Silva Araujo	5	0	2006–2010
7	Emerson Cesario	4	0	2012–2014
8	Adriano Quintão	2	0	2003–2008
9	Juliao Monteiro	1	0	2012–2016
=	**Georgino Mendonça**	1	0	2021-present

Youngest debutant record^{1}
Rank	Player	Age	Debut date	Opponent	Tournament
1.	Paulo Gali	13 years, 244 days	1 September 2018	Brunei	2018 AFF Championship qualification
2.	Ade	15 years, 172 days	21 November 2010	Indonesia	Friendly Match
3.	Anggisu Barbosa	15 years, 217 days	19 October 2008	Cambodia	2008 AFF Suzuki Cup qualification
4.	Nelson Sing	15 years, 225 days	21 November 2010	Indonesia	Friendly Match
5.	Olegario	16 years, 28 days	21 November 2010	Indonesia	Friendly Match
6.	Gumario	16 years, 47 days	4 December 2017	Chinese Taipei	2017 CTFA International Tournament
7.	José Fonseca	16 years, 63 days	21 November 2010	Indonesia	Friendly Match
8.	Nelson	16 years, 157 days	29 May 2016	Cambodia	Friendly Match
9.	Adi	16 years, 164 days	21 March 2003	Sri Lanka	2004 AFC Asian Cup qualification
=	Efrem Almeida	16 years, 164 days	21 November 2010	Indonesia	Friendly Match
11.	Ervino	16 years, 166 days	12 November 2015	United Arab Emirates	2018 FIFA World Cup qualification (AFC)
12.	Zenivio	16 years, 227 days	5 December 2021	Thailand	2020 AFF Championship
13.	Mouzinho	16 years, 346 days	7 June 2019	Malaysia	2022 FIFA World Cup qualification (AFC)
14.	João Panji	17 years, 35 days	3 December 2017	Laos	2017 CTFA International Tournament
15.	Osvaldo Belo	17 years, 46 days	3 December 2017	Laos	2017 CTFA International Tournament
16.	Elias Mesquita	17 years, 72 days	7 June 2019	Malaysia	2022 FIFA World Cup qualification (AFC)
17.	Henrique Cruz	17 years, 96 days	12 March 2015	Mongolia	2018 FIFA World Cup qualification (AFC)
18.	Agostinho	17 years, 196 days	12 March 2015	Mongolia	2018 FIFA World Cup qualification (AFC)
19.	José Guterres Silva	17 years, 202 days	12 November 2015	United Arab Emirates	2018 FIFA World Cup qualification (AFC)
20.	Victor	17 years, 272 days	3 September 2015	Saudi Arabia	2018 FIFA World Cup qualification (AFC)
21.	Cristevão Fernandes	17 years, 323 days	5 December 2021	Thailand	2020 AFF Championship
22.	Rufino Gama	17 years, 348 days	2 June 2016	Malaysia	2019 AFC Asian Cup qualification
23.	Yohanes Gusmão	17 years, 359 days	12 October 2018	Cambodia	Friendly Match

note: 1. The above list pointed to a player who made his debut before they are even 18 years old.

== See also ==
- Timor-Leste national football team results
