= List of people from Dili =

This is a list of people who were born in, residents of, or otherwise closely associated with Dili, the capital of Timor-Leste.

== Business and finance ==
- Oscar Lima (born 1952), politician and businessman; member of parliament (2023–present)
- Nilton Gusmão dos Santos (born 1978), businessman and sports official

== Entertainment ==
- Marvi (born 2001), singer; winner of The Voice Portugal season 6
- Anito Matos (born 1962), comedian, singer, presenter, and master of ceremonies
- Sandra Pires (born 1969), Portuguese actress and singer

== Government and politics ==
- Mari Alkatiri (born 1949), politician and independence activist; Prime Minister of Timor-Leste (2002–2006; 2017–2018)
- Inês Almeida (born 1963), diplomat; Ambassador of Timor-Leste to Australia (2020–present)
- Paulino Monteiro Soares Babo (born 1962), politician; member of parliament (2012–2017)
- Virgínia Ana Belo (born 1971), politician; member of parliament (2007–present)
- Fernanda Borges (born 1969), politician; minister of finance (2001–2002)
- Sofia Borges (born 1970), diplomat; Permanent Representative of Timor-Leste to the United Nations (2010–2016)
- João Bosco Cárceres (1972–2022), politician and independence activist
- Alberto Carlos (born 1960), politician and diplomat
- José Manuel Carrascalão (born 1960), politician; Deputy Minister of Infrastructure (2009–2012)
- Miguel Pereira de Carvalho (born 1976), politician; Minister of State Administration (2020–2023)
- Ângela Corvelo (born 1970), politician; member of parliament (2012–2017)
- Cristina Yuri dos Santos Costa (born 1980), politician; member of parliament (2023–present)
- Alberto da Silva Cruz (born 1966), politician; member of parliament (2007–2012)
- Francisco Dionisio Fernandes (born 1974), politician and diplomat
- Filomeno Pedro Cabral Fernandes (1955–2020), politician, independence activist, professional footballer, and football official
- José Virgílio Rodrigues Ferreira (born 1979), politician; member of parliament (2018–present)
- António Freitas (born 1973), politician; Vice-Minister of Finance (2022–2023)
- Rui Gomes (born 1958), politician and academic; minister of finance (2020–2023)
- Eládio António de Jesus (born 1971), politician; member of parliament (2012–2017)
- Bendita Moniz Magno (born 1962), politician; member of parliament (2012–present)
- Florentina Martins Smith (born 1958), politician; Minister of Social Solidarity and Inclusion (2017–2018)
- Nélson Martins (born 1968), doctor and politician; minister of health (2007–2012)
- Paulo de Fátima Martins (born 1950), police officer and politician; member of parliament (2007–2012)
- Julião Augusto Mausiry (1966–2021), politician and independence activist; member of parliament (2001–2007)
- Nélia Soares Menezes (born 1986), politician; member of parliament (2018–2023)
- Gertrudes Araújo Moniz (born 1967), politician; member of parliament (2007–2012)
- Marito Mota (born 1970), politician; member of parliament (2018–present)
- Natalino dos Santos Nascimento (born 1969), politician; member of parliament (2002–present)
- José Ramos-Horta (born 1949), politician, diplomat, and independence activist; Prime Minister of Timor-Leste (2006–2007); President of Timor-Leste (2007–2012; 2022–present)
- Maria Angélica da Cruz dos Reis (born 1973), politician; member of parliament (2012–present)
- Paulo Remédios (born 1959), lawyer and politician; Vice-Minister for Institutional Empowerment (2023–present)
- Roque Rodrigues (born 1949), politician and independence activist; minister of defense (2001–2006)
- Constâncio Pinto (born 1963), politician and independence activist; Minister of Commerce, Industry and Environment (2015–2017)
- Milena Pires (born 1966), politician, diplomat, and women's rights activist; Permanent Representative of Timor-Leste to the United Nations (2016–2021)
- Gregório Saldanha (born 1962), politician; President of Dili Municipality (2024–present)
- Guilhermina Filomena Saldanha (born 1959), politician; President of Dili Municipality (2021–2024)
- Abel dos Santos (born 1974), politician; member of parliament (2023–present)
- Cedelizia Faria dos Santos (born 1975), politician; member of parliament (2023–present)
- Maria do Céu Sarmento (born 1968), doctor, academic, and politician; minister of health (2015–2017)
- Maria Angelina Lopes Sarmento (born 1978), politician; member of parliament (2017–present)
- Estanislau da Silva (born 1952), politician and diplomat; acting prime minister of Timor-Leste (2007)
- Maria Adozinda Pires da Silva (born 1975), politician; member of parliament (2012–2017)
- José Teixeira (born 1975), politician; Minister of Natural and Mineral Resources, and Energy Policy (2006–2007)
- Guido Valadares (1934–1976), politician and independence activist; Vice-Minister of Labour and Social Welfare (1975)
- Ivo Valente (born 1969), politician and lawyer; Minister of Justice (2015–2017)
- Manuel Vong (born 1962), politician and academic; Minister of Tourism (2017–2018)
- Adalgisa Ximenes (born 1968), diplomat and politician

== Journalism and media ==
- Hugo Maria Fernandes (born 1971), journalist; director of Centro Nacional Chega! (2017–present)

== Law ==
- Silverio Pinto Baptista (born 1969), lawyer, civil servant, and human rights activist; Provedor for Human Rights and Justice (2014–2018)
- Maria Solana da Conceição Fernandes (born 1966), politician, lawyer, and judge
- Vicente Fernandes e Brito (born 1968), lawyer and civil servant; Deputy Attorney-General (2009–2012)

== Literature ==
- Fernando Sylvan (1917–1993), poet and writer

== Military ==
- Ma'huno Bulerek Karathayano (1949–2021) politician, independence activist, and guerrilla leader; commander of FALINTIL (1992–1993)

== Religion ==
- Maria de Fatima Wadhoomall Gomes (1940–2020), Protestant minister and co-founder of the Protestant Church in East Timor
- Filomeno Jacob (born 1960), Catholic priest and academic; Minister for Social Affairs in the I UNTAET Transitional Government (2000–2001)

== Sports ==
=== Football ===
- Eusebio de Almeida (born 1985), professional footballer
- Frangcyatma Alves (born 1997), professional footballer
- Ricky Nídio Alves (born 1994), professional footballer
- Agostinho da Silva Araújo (born 1997), professional footballer
- Leonel da Silva Araújo (born 1986), professional footballer
- Fagio Augusto (born 1997), professional footballer
- Anggisu Barbosa (born 1993), professional footballer
- Osvaldo Belo (born 2000), professional footballer
- Miro Baldo Bento (born 1975), professional footballer
- Chiquito do Carmo (born 1986), professional footballer
- Nazário do Carmo (born 1992), professional footballer
- Marcelino da Costa (born 1983), professional footballer
- Henrique Cruz (born 1997), professional footballer
- Cristevão Moniz Fernandes (born 2004), professional footballer
- Ezequiel Fernandes (born 1996), professional footballer
- Domingos Freitas (born 1997), professional footballer and coach
- Gali Freitas (born 2004), professional footballer
- Vicente Ramos Freitas (born 1985), professional footballer and coach
- Jhon Frith (born 2002), professional footballer
- Filomeno Junior (born 1998), professional footballer
- Diamantino Leong (born 1986), professional footballer
- Ricardo Sousa Maia (born 1991), professional footballer
- Zeferino Martins (born 1985), professional footballer
- Julião Monteiro (born 1993), professional footballer
- Nídio Neto (born 1995), professional footballer
- Boavida Olegario (born 1994), professional footballer
- Filipe Oliveira (born 1995), professional footballer
- João Panji (born 2000), professional footballer
- Eduardo Pereira (born 1972), professional footballer
- José João Pereira (born 1981), professional footballer
- Nataniel Reis (born 1995), professional footballer
- Helder Mota Ricardo (born 1977), professional footballer
- Efrem Santos (born 1994), professional footballer
- Emílio da Silva (born 1982), professional footballer
- Juvitu da Silva (born 1987), professional footballer
- Jaimito Soares (born 2003), professional footballer
- Nilo Soares (born 1994), professional footballer
- Jorge Sabas Victor (born 1997), professional footballer
- Nando Xavier (born 1985), professional footballer

=== Others ===
- Aguida Amaral (born 1972), Olympic marathon runner
- Manuel Ataide (born 2001), Olympic sprinter
- Angela Freitas de Fátima Araújo (born 2001), middle- and long-distance runner
- Martinho de Araújo (born 1973), Olympic weightlifter
- Calisto da Costa (born 1979), Olympic marathon runner
- Carlos Galambas (born 1973), Portuguese professional handball player, coach, and sports manager
- Nelia Martins (born 1998), Olympic middle-distance runner

== Miscellaneous ==
- Bella Galhos (born 1972), human rights activist, translator, and environmentalist
