= Timor-Leste at the 2014 Asian Games =

- IOC code: TLS
- NOC: National Olympic Committee of Timor Leste

in Incheon
- Competitors: 33 in 7 sports
- Flag bearer: Lurdes Fabiola
- Medals: Gold 0 Silver 0 Bronze 0 Total 0

Asian Games appearances (overview)
- 2002; 2006; 2010; 2014; 2018; 2022; 2026

Timor-Leste participated in the 2014 Asian Games in Incheon, South Korea from 19 September to 4 October 2014.

== Athletics ==
Men's

Athlete	Event	Round 1			Semifinal		Final	
Athlete	Event	Heat	Time	Rank	Time	Rank	Time	Rank
Samuel Marçal dos Santos	400 m	1	53.78	30	did not advance			

Women

Athlete	Event	Round 1			Final	
Athlete	Event	Heat	Time	Rank	Time	Rank
Mariquita dos Santos	1500 m				5:07.69	14

== Beach volleyball ==
Men

Athlete	Preliminary round		Round of 16	Quarterfinals	Semifinals	Final	Rank
Athlete	Group E	Rank	Round of 16	Quarterfinals	Semifinals	Final	Rank
Gaudencio Xavier; Adriano Correia	Bao (CHN); Ha (CHN); L 0 - 2; 15-21, 11-21	4	did not advance				25
Gaudencio Xavier; Adriano Correia	Murakami (JPN); Takahashi (JPN); L 0 - 2; 18-21, 10-21	4	did not advance				25
Gaudencio Xavier; Adriano Correia	Saifuddin (MAS); Zokri (MAS); L 0 - 2; 15-21, 13-21	4	did not advance				25

== Boxing ==
Men

Athlete	Event	Round of 32	Round of 16	Quarterfinal	Semifinal	Final	Rank
Leonel Parada	56 kg	Thapa (IND); L WO	Did not advance				17
Elio Jenoveva da Silva	69 kg	Bye	Saensit (THA); L TKO	Did not advance			9

== Cycling ==
Men

Road

Athlete	Event	Time	Rank
Antonio Fernandes Viana	Time trial	1:06:08.69	21

Mountain Bike

Athlete	Event	Time	Rank
Noelio Antonio Pereira	Cross-country	−3 laps	19

== Football ==
Men

Squad list	Preliminary round		Round of 16	Quarterfinals	Semifinal	Final	Rank
Squad list	Group E	Rank	Round of 16	Quarterfinals	Semifinal	Final	Rank
Jorge Sabas Victor; Adelino Trindade; Anggisu Barbosa; Paulo Martins; Marcos Morais Gusmao; Carlos Magno; Nilo Soares; Fellipe Bertoldo; Ricardo Sousa Maia; Diogo Santos Rangel; Ramos Maxanches; Eujebio Pereira; Boavida Olegario; Agostinho da Silva; José Guterres Silva; Candido Monteiro; Juliao Monteiro; Filipe Oliveira; Nataniel Reis; Ezequiel Fernandes	Indonesia; L 0-7	4	Did not advance				28
Jorge Sabas Victor; Adelino Trindade; Anggisu Barbosa; Paulo Martins; Marcos Morais Gusmao; Carlos Magno; Nilo Soares; Fellipe Bertoldo; Ricardo Sousa Maia; Diogo Santos Rangel; Ramos Maxanches; Eujebio Pereira; Boavida Olegario; Agostinho da Silva; José Guterres Silva; Candido Monteiro; Juliao Monteiro; Filipe Oliveira; Nataniel Reis; Ezequiel Fernandes	Thailand; L 0-3	4	Did not advance				28
Jorge Sabas Victor; Adelino Trindade; Anggisu Barbosa; Paulo Martins; Marcos Morais Gusmao; Carlos Magno; Nilo Soares; Fellipe Bertoldo; Ricardo Sousa Maia; Diogo Santos Rangel; Ramos Maxanches; Eujebio Pereira; Boavida Olegario; Agostinho da Silva; José Guterres Silva; Candido Monteiro; Juliao Monteiro; Filipe Oliveira; Nataniel Reis; Ezequiel Fernandes	Maldives; L 2-3	4	Did not advance				28

== Karate ==
Men's kumite

Athlete	Event	1/16 final	1/8 final	Quarterfinal	Semifinal	Final	Rank
Teodoro Koli	55 kg		Aktauov (KAZ); L 0-8		Repechage; Sanif (BRU); L 0-8	Did not advance	7
Jaime Godinho Soares	60 kg	Bye	Chong (MAC); L 0-8 KK	Did not advance			9

== Taekwondo ==
Women

Athlete	Event	1/8 final	Quarterfinal	Semifinal	Final	Rank
Luisa Rosa	49 kg	Kiçigulowa (TKM); W 16-2	Ilao (PHI); L 2-6	did not advance		5
Aida Lemos	53 kg	Narbabaeva (UZB); L 3-4	did not advance			9
