= José Carlos da Fonseca =

East Timorese footballer

Jose Fonseca
Personal information
- Full name: Jose Carlos da Fonseca
- Date of birth: 19 September 1994 (age 32)
- Place of birth: Lospalos, East Timor, Indonesia
- Height: 1.74 m (5 ft 8 1/2 in)
- Position: Midfielder

Team information
- Current team: AD SLB

Senior career*
Years	Team	Apps	(Gls)
2014–2016	Phayao	52	

International career^{‡}
2009–2010	Timor-Leste U-16	9	(1)
2009	Timor-Leste U-19		
2014–2015	Timor-Leste U-21		
2012–2015	Timor-Leste U-23	15	(1)
2010–2017	Timor-Leste	26	(0)
- * Club domestic league appearances and goals ‡ National team caps and goals as of 5 November 2016

Jose Carlos da Fonseca (born 19 September 1994), also known as Jose Fonseca, is a football player who currently plays for Timor-Leste national football team.

== International career ==
Fonseca made his senior international debut in the friendly match against Indonesia national football team on 21 November 2010 when he was aged 16 years 63 days.
