= Timor-Leste national under-21 football team =

National association football team

Timor-Leste U-21
- Nickname(s): O Sol Nascente (The Raising Sun); The Little Samba Nation; El Lafaek
- Association: Federação de Futebol de Timor-Leste
- Confederation: AFC (Asia)
- Head coach: Almerio Isaac
- Captain: Nilo Soares
- Home stadium: Timor-Leste National Stadium
- FIFA code: TLS
First colours	Second colours

First international
- Maldives 2–2 Timor-Leste (Palembang, Indonesia; 6 August 2005)

Biggest win
- Timor-Leste 2–0 Malaysia (Bandar Seri Begawan, Brunei; 27 February 2012)

Biggest defeat
- Malaysia 7–1 Timor-Leste (Ho Chi Minh City, Vietnam; 6 August 2009)

The Youngs Timor-Leste is the national team of Timor-Leste and is controlled by the Federação de Futebol de Timor-Leste. Timor-Leste has never had success on the international stage. They are currently one of the weakest teams in the world. Timor-Leste joined FIFA on 12 September 2005.

== Kits ==
Timor-Leste's kit is a red jersey, red shorts and red socks. Their away kit is with a white jersey with black shorts and red or white socks. The kits are currently manufactured by Adidas and Nike. Timor-Leste first kit is under Tiger, when the team play for the 2004 Tiger Cup. The first kit is red jersey, black shorts and red sock and their away kit is white jersey with two black sleeves, black short and white socks.

== Competition records ==
=== AFC U-22 Championship record ===
AFC U-22 Championship
Year	Round	GP	W	D	L	GS	GA
2013	TBD	0	0	0	0	0	0
Total	0/0	0	0	0	0	0	0

=== Hassanal Bolkiah Trophy record ===
(Brunei) Hassanal Bolkiah Trophy (Brunei)
Year	Round	GP	W	D	L	GS	GA
2002	Did not enter	0	0	0	0	0	0
2005	Did not enter	0	0	0	0	0	0
2007	Did not enter	0	0	0	0	0	0
2012	Group Stage	4	2	0	2	3	3
2014	Group Stage	4	0	1	3	3	12
2018	Champions	5	3	1	1	5	4
Total	Best:Champions	13	5	2	6	11	19

== Squad ==
=== Current squad ===
The following players were called up for the 2018 Hassanal Bolkiah Trophy in Brunei. Players marked with an asterisk (*) were over age for this competition.

Head coach: (Timor-Leste) Eduardo Pereira

No.	Pos.	Player	Date of birth (age)	Caps	Goals	Club
1	GK	Aderito Raul Fernandes	15 May 1997 (age 28)			(East Timor Football Federation) AS Ponta Leste
20	GK	Fagio Augusto	29 April 1997 (age 29)			(East Timor Football Federation) Karketu Dili
	GK	Fernando da Costa				(East Timor Football Federation) Benfica Laulara
2	DF	Julião dos Reis Mendonça*	3 July 1995 (age 30)			(East Timor Football Federation) DIT
3	DF	Gumario Augusto Fernandez da Silva Moreira	14 December 2001 (age 24)			(East Timor Football Federation) DIT
4	DF	Candido Monteiro de Oliveira	2 December 1997 (age 28)			(East Timor Football Federation) AS Ponta Leste
5	DF	Jorge Sabas Victor (Captain)	5 December 1997 (age 28)			(East Timor Football Federation) Carsae
6	DF	Nidio Ricardo Ferreira Alves*	17 June 1994 (age 31)			(East Timor Football Federation) Benfica Laulara
15	DF	Agostinho da Silva Araujo	28 August 1997 (age 28)			(East Timor Football Federation) FC Porto Taibesi
18	DF	Armindo Correira de Almeida	18 April 1998 (age 28)			(East Timor Football Federation) AS Académica
22	DF	Nelson Sarmento Viegas	24 December 1999 (age 26)			(East Timor Football Federation) Karketu Dili
8	MF	José Oliveira	28 October 1997 (age 28)			(East Timor Football Federation) Benfica Laulara
11	MF	Mouzinho de Lima				(East Timor Football Federation)
12	MF	Gaudencio Armindo Monteiro	2 July 1998 (age 27)			(East Timor Football Federation) SLB Laulara
13	MF	Expedito Soares da Conceição				(East Timor Football Federation)
14	MF	Gelvanio Angelo da Costa	8 October 1998 (age 27)			(East Timor Football Federation) Karketu Dili
19	MF	Boavida Olegario*	24 October 1994 (age 31)			(East Timor Football Federation) Karketu Dili
23	MF	Osvaldo Lucas Baptisto Belo	18 October 2000 (age 25)			(East Timor Football Federation)
7	FW	Rufino Gama	20 June 1998 (age 27)			(East Timor Football Federation) Karketu Dili
9	FW	Silveiro Garcia*	2 April 1994 (age 32)			(East Timor Football Federation) AS Ponta Leste
10	FW	Henrique Cruz	6 December 1997 (age 28)			(East Timor Football Federation) Boavista Dili
16	FW	Filomeno Junior da Costa	11 February 1997 (age 29)			(East Timor Football Federation) SLB Laulara
17	FW	Lourenco Ximenes				(East Timor Football Federation) AS Ponta Leste
21	FW	Frangcyatma Alves	27 January 1997 (age 29)			(East Timor Football Federation) Karketu Dili

== Coaching staff ==
Position	Name
Head coach	(Timor-Leste) Almerio Isaac
Assistant coach	Vacant
Goalkeeper coach	Vacant
Fitness coach	Vacant
Physiotherapist	Vacant
Media officer	Vacant
Administrator	Vacant
Official	Vacant
Kitman	Vacant

== List of Coaches ==
Coach	Coaching period	Pld	W	D	L	Achievements
(Timor-Leste) Almerio Isaac	2012	4	2	0	2	2012 Hassanal Bolkiah Trophy - Round 1 (First Time)
(Japan) Takuma Koga	2014	4	0	1	3	2014 Hassanal Bolkiah Trophy - Round 1
(Timor-Leste) Eduardo Pereira	2018	5	3	1	1	2018 Hassanal Bolkiah Trophy - Winner

== Stadium ==
- Timor-Leste National Stadium (2002-present)
