= Nur Ikhmal Damit =

Bruneian footballer

Nur Ikhmal
Personal information
- Full name: Muhammad Nur Ikhmal bin Damit
- Date of birth: 5 March 1993 (age 33)
- Place of birth: Brunei
- Height: 1.71 m (5 ft 7 in)
- Position: Midfielder

Senior career*
Years	Team	Apps	(Gls)
2011	Brunei Youth Team		
2012–2015	MS ABDB		(0)
2015–2020	Indera SC		(2)
2021	Kasuka FC		(0)

International career^{‡}
2013–2019	Brunei U23	13	(0)
2018	Brunei U21	3	(0)
2016–2019	Brunei	3	(0)
- * Club domestic league appearances and goals as of 26 August 2022 ‡ National team caps and goals as of 26 August 2022

Muhammad Nur Ikhmal bin Damit (born 5 March 1993) is a Bruneian footballer who plays as a midfielder.

== Club career ==
As a youngster, Ikhmal made appearances for the Brunei Youth Team in the Premier League II in 2011. Afterwards he joined MS ABDB, the football team of his then-employer, the Royal Brunei Armed Forces. He debuted with the team at the September 2012 Brunei Darussalam National Games and won gold, scoring the winner against Brunei-Muara district in the semi-final. MS ABDB also won the 2012 Brunei FA Cup that December but Ikhmal was not in the matchday squad.

Ikhmal played in the first ever game of the Brunei Super League, a 2–1 victory against MS PDB on 14 December 2012. He made six further league appearances that season, finishing in second place and losing out to Indera FC via goal difference. After taking a sabbatical from the 2014 Brunei Super League, Ikhmal reappeared for the army's National Games squad and won his second gold medal in the football category.

Ikhmal played in the final of the 2014-15 Brunei FA Cup on 4 January 2015 and was victorious on the night with a 2–0 scoreline over Najip FC. Although he was registered with MS ABDB for the 2015 season, his commitments for the national team restricted his playing time and by the second half of the season he transferred to defending champions Indera SC.

Ikhmal's new team eventually finished second in the league, then competed against the new champions MS ABDB in the final of the 2015 FA Cup. Ikhmal started the match and scored in injury time against his former team but it was scant consolation as the Armymen won 3–2 in the end.

Ikhmal received a third FA Cup winner's medal after Indera's 2–0 win over MS PDB in the final of the 2017-18 FA Cup on 1 April 2018.

== International career ==
Ikhmal has represented Brunei since 2010 when he was sent to South Korea for the 38th Asian Schools Football Championship (which ultimately Brunei could not participate after their arrival due to the country's suspension from FIFA). He was in contention for a place in the team for the December 2013 SEA Games held in Myanmar and featured in a friendly against Indonesia U23 the previous August, but was not selected.

Ikhmal became an integral player for the under-23s in 2015, featuring in all three games at the 2016 AFC U-23 Championship qualifying held in Indonesia in March. Two months later, he departed to Singapore with the same squad for the 28th SEA Games. He played in four out of 5 games as Brunei lost every fixture in the football category.

Ikhmal was called up to the senior squad for the 2016 AFF Championship qualification matches on October in Cambodia, as well as the 2016 AFC Solidarity Cup in Malaysia the following month. He made his international debut in a 2–1 victory over Timor-Leste on 15 October. He also started against Cambodia three days later but this time the hosts rant out as 0–3 victors. Picking up an injury in that game, he then made only one substitute appearance at the inaugural Solidarity Cup, with the Wasps finishing fourth at the end of the AFC-sanctioned tournament.

The following year, Ikhmal joined up with the national team under Stephen Ng Heng Seng for the 2017 Aceh World Solidarity Tsunami Cup. The charity meet was initially billed as a FIFA 'A'-international standard tournament before being changed to an under-23 tournament. After defeats against hosts Indonesia and Kyrgyzstan, Brunei's final game against Mongolia was cancelled due to bad weather.

Ikhmal was selected for the 2018 Hassanal Bolkiah Trophy as one of the three overage players allowed for the under-21 tournament, along with Yura Indera Putera Yunos and Razimie Ramlli. Ikhmal played all three group matches but only clocked 180 minutes - he was a second-half substitute in the first game and was taken off after half time in the last game.

Ikhmal accepted a callup by the national team for the two-legged 2022 World Cup qualification matches against Mongolia in June 2019. He did not see playing time as Robbie Servais preferred Yura Indera Putera Yunos and Shah Razen Said in the central midfield roles. Later that year Ikhmal was selected as one of two overage players in the Brunei under-22 squad for the 2019 Southeast Asian Games.

== Honours ==
MS ABDB

- Brunei FA Cup (2): 2012, 2014–15

Indera SC

- Brunei FA Cup: 2017–18
- Piala Sumbangsih: 2018
