= Thinnakone Vongsa =

Laotian association football player

Personal information
- Full name: Thinnakone Vongsa
- Date of birth: 20 March 1992 (age 34)
- Place of birth: Laos
- Height: 1.75 m (5 ft 9 in)
- Position: Defender

Senior career*
Years	Team	Apps	(Gls)
2012–2018	Lao Police		
2019	Master 7		

International career
2013	Laos	6	(0)
- * Club domestic league appearances and goals as of 20:12, 21 January 2019 (UTC)

Thinnakone Vongsa (Lao: ທິນນະກອນ ວົງສາ, born 20 March 1992) is a Laotian footballer who is currently playing as a defender.

== Career statistics ==
=== International ===
As of matches played 21 January 2019.

National team	Year	Apps	Goals
Laos	2013	1	0
Laos	2014	0	0
Laos	2015	0	0
Laos	2016	0	0
Laos	2017	1	0
Laos	2018	4	0
Total		6	0
