= Soukchinda Natphasouk =

Laotian footballer

Personal information
- Full name: Soukchinda Natphasouk
- Date of birth: 30 October 1995 (age 31)
- Place of birth: Vientiane, Laos
- Position: Forward

Team information
- Current team: Champasak F.C
- Number: 9

Youth career
- 2011: Lao Police Club

Senior career*
Years	Team	Apps	(Gls)
2012-2020	Lao Police Club		
2021	Garuda		
2022-	Champasak FC	3	(2)

International career
2015-2018	Laos U23	20	(10)
2012–2017	Laos		
- * Club domestic league appearances and goals

Soukchinda Natphasouk (Lao: ສູກຈິນດາ ນັດຜາສຸກ; born 30 October 1995) is a Laotian professional footballer who currently plays as a midfielder for Champasak F.C in the Lao League 1. season 2022 He scored two goals at the 2015 Southeast Asian Games.

== International career ==
=== International goals ===
Scores and results list Laos's goal tally first.

No	Date	Venue	Opponent	Score	Result	Competition
1.	3 December 2017	Taipei Municipal Stadium, Taipei, Taiwan	Timor-Leste	2–0	2–1	2017 CTFA International Tournament
