= Phạm Văn Tiến =

Vietnamese footballer

Personal information
- Full name: Phạm Văn Tiến
- Date of birth: 30 April 1993 (age 33)
- Place of birth: Núi Thành, Quảng Nam, Vietnam
- Height: 1.87 m (6 ft 2 in)
- Position: Goalkeeper

Youth career
- 2006–2012: HAGL – Arsenal JMG Academy

Senior career*
Years	Team	Apps	(Gls)
2013–2018	Hoàng Anh Gia Lai	45	(0)
2018–2020	Becamex Bình Dương	2	(0)
2021–2022	Bà Rịa - Vũng Tàu	18	(0)

International career
2015–2016	Vietnam U23	1	(0)
- * Club domestic league appearances and goals as of 2 October 2018

Phạm Văn Tiến (born 30 April 1993) is a Vietnamese footballer who plays as a goalkeeper for V.League 2 club Bà Rịa - Vũng Tàu.

== Honours ==
=== International ===
Vietnam U23

(bronze) Third place : Southeast Asian Games: 2015
