= CTFA International Tournament =

2017 CTFA International Tournament 2017中華足協國際邀請賽
Tournament details
- Host country: Taiwan
- Dates: 1–5 December
- Teams: 4 (from 1 confederation)
- Venue: 1 (in 1 host city)

Final positions
- Champions: Chinese Taipei (1st title)
- Runners-up: Philippines
- Third place: Timor-Leste
- Fourth place: Laos

Tournament statistics
- Matches played: 6
- Goals scored: 17 (2.83 per match)
- Top scorer: (Chinese Taipei) Li Mao (4 goals)

The CTFA International Tournament (Chinese: 2017中華足協國際邀請賽) was a tier 1 international football competition held in Taipei, Taiwan from 1-5 December 2017, organized by the Chinese Taipei Football Association (CTFA). Results involving the Philippines national football team led to strong reactions by Filipino football fans, and disputes between football administrators. The six games in the tournament were authorized by FIFA as International “A” Matches.

== Participating nations ==
Four nations participated in the tournament.

Nation	FIFA ranking	Notes
Chinese Taipei	135	Hosts
Laos	184	
Philippines	118	The Philippines were initially planning to send the national under-23 squad, but decided to include national team players from Davao Aguilas and Stallion Laguna. Most of the coaching and backroom staff were from the national under-23 team.
Timor-Leste	196	

== Venue ==
Taipei	Taiwan
Taipei Municipal Stadium	CTFA International Tournament (Taiwan)
Capacity: 20,000	CTFA International Tournament (Taiwan)

== Matches ==
- All times are National Standard Time – UTC+8

Team	Pld	W	D	L	GF	GA	GD	Pts	Tiebreaker
Chinese Taipei	3	3	0	0	8	1	+7	9	—
Philippines	3	1	0	2	3	5	–2	3	3–2
Timor-Leste	3	1	0	2	3	5	–2	3	2–2
Laos	3	1	0	2	3	6	–3	3	3–4

1 December 2017
16:00

Laos	1–3	Philippines
Phithack 90+5'	Report	P. Younghusband 35'; Guirado 47'; Miyagi 89'

Taipei Municipal Stadium, Taipei
Referee: Yu Ming-Hsun (Chinese Taipei)

3 December 2017
16:00

Laos	2–1	Timor-Leste
Nonmany 2' (pen.); Soukchinda 41'	Report	Cruz 84'

Taipei Municipal Stadium, Taipei
Referee: Chen Hsin-Chuan (Chinese Taipei)
3 December 2017
19:00

Chinese Taipei	3–0	Philippines
Li Mao 38', 63'; Chen Ting-yang 81'	Report

Taipei Municipal Stadium, Taipei
Referee: Pranjal Banerjee (India)

4 December 2017 (Note: Originally scheduled for 1 December but postponed because the Timor Leste team could not arrive in Taiwan on time due to the eruption of Mount Agung.)
19:00

Chinese Taipei	3–1	Timor-Leste
Wen Chih-hao 20'; Chen Ting-yang 63'; Chen Po-liang 77'	Report	Gama 58'

Taipei Municipal Stadium, Taipei
Referee: Ali Al Samaheeji (Bahrain)

5 December 2017
16:00

Timor-Leste	1–0	Philippines
Garcia 89'	Report

Taipei Municipal Stadium, Taipei
Referee: Kao Jung-Fang (Chinese Taipei)
5 December 2017
19:00

Chinese Taipei	2–0	Laos
Li Mao 9', 12'	Report

Taipei Municipal Stadium, Taipei
Referee: Pranjal Banerjee (India)

CTFA International Tournament winner

Chinese Taipei
First title

== Goalscorers ==
There were 17 goals scored in 6 matches, for an average of 2.83 goals per match.

4 goals

- (Chinese Taipei) Li Mao

2 goals

- (Chinese Taipei) Chen Ting-yang

1 goal

- (Philippines) Phil Younghusband
- (Philippines) Ángel Guirado
- (Philippines) Kintaro Miyagi
- (Laos) Phithack Kongmathilath
- (Laos) Chiu Nonmany
- (Laos) Soukchinda Natphasouk
- (Timor-Leste) Henrique Cruz
- (Timor-Leste) Rufino Gama
- (Timor-Leste) Silveiro Garcia
- (Chinese Taipei) Chen Po-liang
- (Chinese Taipei) Wen Chih-hao

== Aftermath ==
After the 1-2 win–loss result by the Philippines national football team, particularly the loss to 196th-ranked Timor-Leste on the seventh anniversary of the "Miracle in Hanoi", Philippines fans reacted with disappointment and anger. Former national team manager Dan Palami joined in criticism of team selection, although the Philippines Football Federation was limited by player commitments to teams involved in the 2017 Philippines Football League finals series. The decision to send a team to the tournament during the PFL finals was also questioned, along with concern about the expected effect on the Philippines national team's FIFA World Ranking, which subsequently dropped six spots in the December 2017 FIFA rankings. Vietnam surpassed the Philippines as top national men's team in Southeast Asia. Jefferson Cheng, manager of the CTFA International Tournament team and owner of Davao Aguilas FC, defended selection decisions, asking that supporters consider the value of giving young players experience in International “A” Matches.

In contrast, the Chinese Taipei Football Association reacted enthusiastically to the Chinese Taipei 3-0 tournament victory, reporting it as a high point in their history.

The Timor-Leste national team was reported by the Taipei Times to be "delighted" by their unexpected win over the Philippines after losing each of their earlier games by one goal. Timor-Leste rose five spots in the December 2017 FIFA rankings on the strength of this win.

== See also ==
- List of sporting events in Taiwan
