= Trần Phi Sơn =

Vietnamese footballer

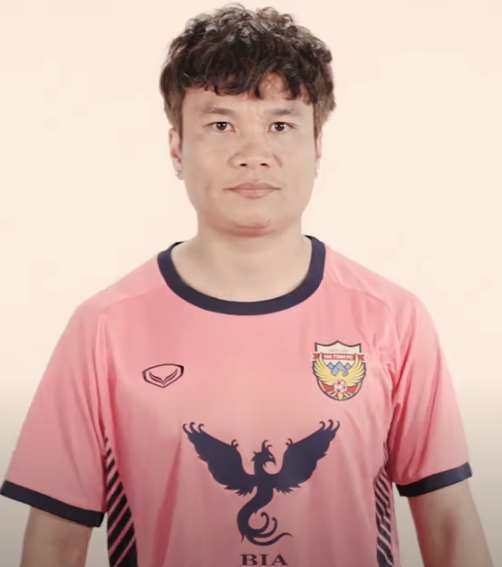
- Phi Sơn in 2022

Personal information
- Full name: Trần Phi Sơn
- Date of birth: 17 June 1992 (age 34)
- Place of birth: Hương Sơn, Hà Tĩnh, Vietnam
- Height: 1.68 m (5 ft 6 in)
- Position: Winger

Youth career
- 2003–2011: Song Lam Nghe An

Senior career*
Years	Team	Apps	(Gls)
2012–2017	Sông Lam Nghệ An	107	(25)
2018–2020	Hồ Chí Minh City	33	(10)
2021–2025	Hồng Lĩnh Hà Tĩnh	51	(5)
2025	Trường Tươi Bình Phước	6	(1)
2026	Hồng Lĩnh Hà Tĩnh	1	(0)

International career^{‡}
2012–2014	Vietnam U21	3	(0)
2013–2014	Vietnam U23	8	(3)
2015–2016	Vietnam	3	(1)
- * Club domestic league appearances and goals as of 21 June 2025 ‡ National team caps and goals as of 28 January 2017

Trần Phi Sơn (born 14 March 1992) is a Vietnamese professional footballer who plays as a winger for club Phi Sơn has played three times for the Vietnam national team.

Phi Sơn is given the nickname "Vietnamese Ronaldo", as his dribbling style resembles Cristiano Ronaldo's, as he often displays the step overs in games.

== International career ==
=== Vietnam U23 ===
Goal	Date	Venue	Opponent	Score	Result	Competition
1.	15 September 2014	Ansan Wa~ Stadium, Ansan, South Korea	Iran	3–0	4-1	2014 Asian Games
2.	29 May 2015	Bishan Stadium, Bishan, Singapore	Brunei	2–0	6-0	2015 Southeast Asian Games
3.	7 June 2015	Bishan Stadium, Bishan, Singapore	Timor-Leste	1–0	4-0	2015 Southeast Asian Games

=== Vietnam ===
Scores and results list Vietnam's goal tally first.

No.	Date	Venue	Opponent	Score	Result	Competition
1.	8 September 2015	Taipei Municipal Stadium, Taipei, Taiwan	Chinese Taipei	2–1	2–1	2018 FIFA World Cup qualification

== Honours ==
Song Lam Nghe An

- Vietnamese Cup: 2017

Vietnam U23

- SEA Games bronze medal: 2015

Individual

- Vietnamese Young Player of the Year: 2012
- V.League 1 Goal of the Season: 2023
- V.League 1 Goal of the Month: February 2023, August 2023
