= Paulo Helber =

Brazilian footballer

Personal information
- Full name: Paulo Helber Rosa Ribeiro
- Date of birth: 28 June 1992 (age 34)
- Place of birth: Varginha, Brazil
- Height: 1.80 m (5 ft 11 in)
- Position: Midfielder

Team information
- Current team: Patrocinense (head coach)

Youth career
- Santos
- 2011: Mirassol

Senior career*
Years	Team	Apps	(Gls)
2011	Barretos	16	(2)
2012–2013	Dili United	11	(3)
2013–2014	Monte Azul	20	(5)
2014–2015	Inter de Bebedouro	10	(1)
2015	Lanexang United	7	(0)
2016	Bhayangkara Surabaya United	3	(0)
2016–2017	Monte Carlo		
2018–	United Victory		

International career
2011–2015	Timor-Leste U23	6	(1)
2012–2016	Timor-Leste	9	(0)

Managerial career
- 2021: Varginha (assistant)
- 2022: São Carlos (assistant)
- 2023: Democrata GV (assistant)
- 2023: Paracatu (assistant)
- 2024: Varginha
- 2025: Sergipe (assistant)
- 2025: Novo Esporte
- 2026: Brasília
- 2026: CEOV (assistant)
- 2026: Itabaiana (assistant)
- 2026–: Patrocinense
- * Club domestic league appearances and goals

Paulo Helber Rosa Ribeiro (born 28 June 1992) is a Brazilian football coach and former player who played as a midfielder. He is the current head coach of Patrocinense.

== International career ==
A naturalised citizen of Timor-Leste, he made his senior international debut on 5 October 2012 in a 2012 AFF Suzuki Cup qualification match against the Cambodia national football team.

On 19 January 2017, the Asian Football Confederation declared Paulo Helber and eleven other Brazilian men's footballers ineligible to represent East Timor.
