= Rufino Gama =

East Timorese footballer

Personal information
- Full name: Rufino Walter Gama
- Date of birth: 20 June 1998 (age 28)
- Place of birth: Baucau, East Timor, Indonesia
- Height: 1.70 m (5 ft 7 in)
- Position: Striker

Team information
- Current team: Coração FC
- Number: 99

Youth career
- –2015: AS Académica

Senior career*
| Years | Team | Apps | (Gls) |
| 2016–2017 | AS Académica | | |
| 2017–2018 | Cecusan | | |
| 2018–2019 | Karketu Dili | 28 | (15) |
| 2020–2024 | Lalenok United | 10 | (2) |
| 2024 | São José | 9 | |
| 2026 | Coração FC | | |

International career
- Timor-Leste U16
| 2012–2016 | Timor-Leste U20 | 12 | (4) |
| 2015–2019 | Timor-Leste U23 | 16 | (2) |
| 2016–2022 | Timor-Leste | 22 | (7) |
- * Club domestic league appearances and goals

Rufino Walter Gama (born 20 June 1998) is a Timorese professional footballer and former top scorer of Timor-Leste national football team with 7 goals. He played for Karketu Dili FC since 2018. He came to Lalenok United in January 2020, to strengthen the Club in the AFC Cup 2020 Playoff match against PSM Makassar. In 2024 while playing for São José, Rufino scored the game winning goal in the final of the Copa FFTL.

== International career ==
Gama made his international debut in 2016 as an 81st-minute substitute against Malaysia. He scored his first international goal for Timor Leste in the game against Chinese Taipei which ended with a 1–2 defeat.

In September 2018, he was selected for the two-legged 2018 AFF Suzuki Cup qualifying matches against Brunei. He started both games as Timor-Leste win to advance to the competition proper, win 3–2 on aggregate.

The following year, Gama was selected for the 23 squad man for two-legged 2022 World Cup qualification in June. He started in both games and scored one goal in the second leg at home for a 1–5 loss over Malaysia.

== Career statistics ==
=== International ===
| National team | Year | Apps | Goals |
|---|---|---|---|
| Timor-Leste | 2016 | 6 | 2 |
| Timor-Leste | 2017 | 3 | 1 |
| Timor-Leste | 2018 | 7 | 3 |
| Timor-Leste | 2019 | 2 | 1 |
| Timor-Leste | 2020 | 0 | 0 |
| Timor-Leste | 2021 | 3 | 0 |
| Timor-Leste | 2022 | 1 | 0 |
| Total | | 22 | 7 |

==== International goals ====
Scores and results list East Timor's goal tally first.

| No. | Date | Venue | Opponent | Score | Result | Competition |
|---|---|---|---|---|---|---|
| 1. | 8 October 2016 | National Stadium, Kaohsiung, Taiwan | Chinese Taipei | 1–0 | 1–2 | 2019 AFC Asian Cup qualification |
| 2. | 15 October 2016 | Olympic Stadium, Phnom Penh, Cambodia | Brunei | 1–0 | 1–2 | 2016 AFF Championship qualification |
| 3. | 4 December 2017 | Taipei Municipal Stadium, Taipei, Taiwan | Chinese Taipei | 1–1 | 1–3 | 2017 CTFA International Tournament |
| 4. | 12 October 2018 | Olympic Stadium, Phnom Penh, Cambodia | Cambodia | 2–1 | 2–2 | Friendly |
| 5. | 13 November 2018 | Gelora Bung Karno Stadium, Jakarta, Indonesia | Indonesia | 1–0 | 1–3 | 2018 AFF Championship |
| 6. | 21 November 2018 | National Stadium, Kallang, Singapore | Singapore | 1–1 | 1–6 | 2018 AFF Championship |
| 7. | 11 June 2019 | Bukit Jalil National Stadium, Kuala Lumpur, Malaysia | Malaysia | 1–5 | 1–5 | 2022 FIFA World Cup qualification |

== Honours ==
Karketu Dili

- Liga Amadora runner-up: 2018

Lalenok United

- Copa FFTL winner: 2020
- Taça 12 de Novembro winner: 2020

São José

- Copa FFTL winner: 2024
