= Juvitu da Silva =

East Timorese footballer

Juvitu Correia da Silva
Personal information
- Full name: Juvitu Correia da Silva
- Date of birth: 27 January 1987 (age 39)
- Place of birth: Dili, Timor Timur, Indonesia
- Height: 1.66 m (5 ft 5 1/2 in)
- Position: Defender

Team information
- Current team: S.E. Gleno
- Number: 3

Senior career*
Years	Team	Apps	(Gls)
2010–2014	Ad. Dili Oeste	52	(18)
2015	S.E. Gleno	0	(0)
2015–	Carsae FC		

International career
2010–present	Timor-Leste	6	(0)
- * Club domestic league appearances and goals as of 28 June 2016

Juvitu Correia da Silva or Juvitu (born January 27, 1987) is an East Timorese footballer who plays for Carsae FC on the Liga Futebol Amadora as defender. He also plays for Timor-Leste national football team.
