= Hồ Ngọc Thắng =

Vietnamese footballer (born 1994)

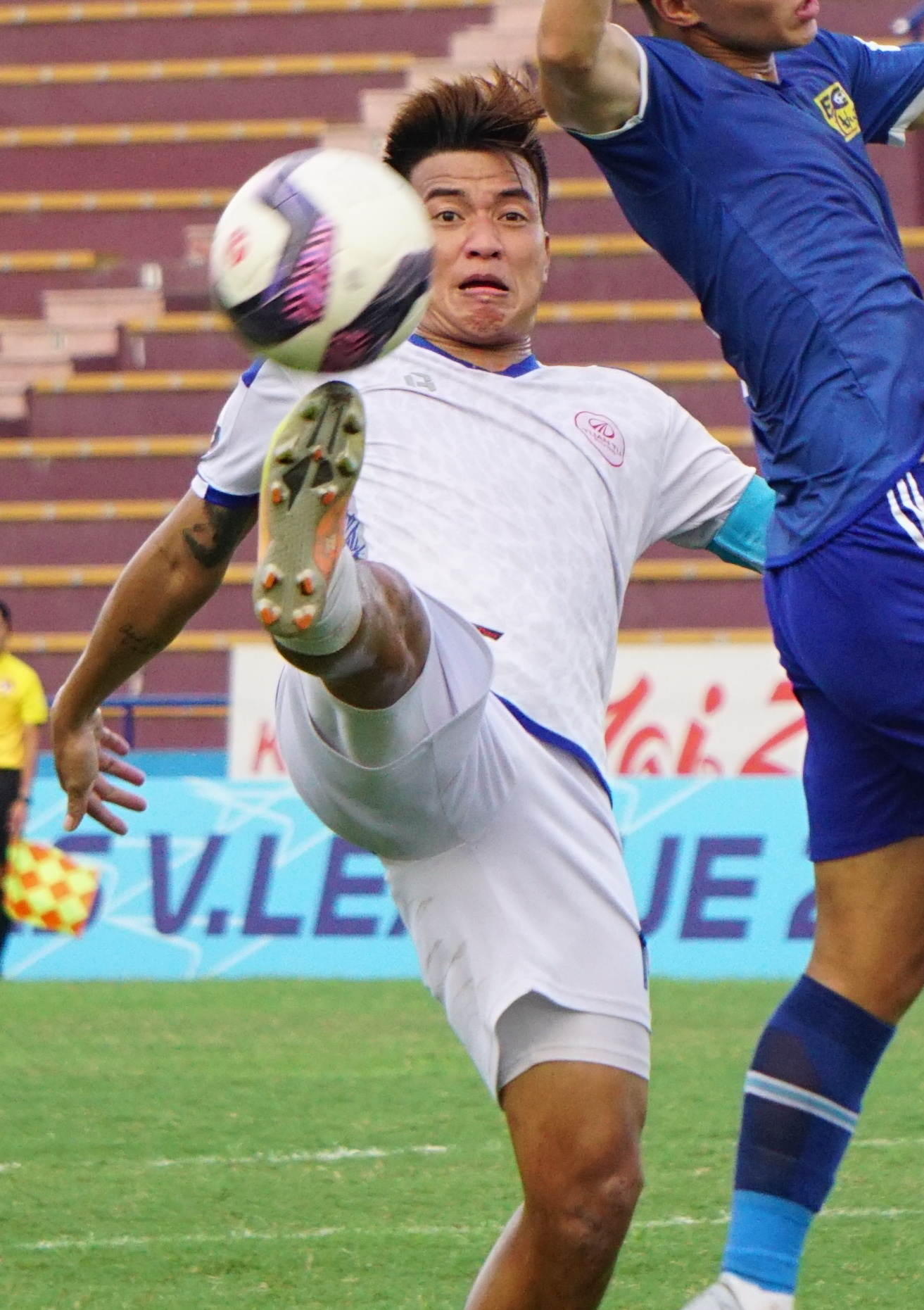
- Ngọc Thắng with Phú Thọ in 2022

Personal information
- Full name: Hồ Ngọc Thắng
- Date of birth: February 10, 1994 (age 32)
- Place of birth: Hải Châu, Đà Nẵng, Vietnam
- Height: 1.78 m (5 ft 10 in)
- Position: Forward

Team information
- Current team: Bắc Ninh (on loan from Công An Hà Nội)
- Number: 18

Youth career
- 2006–2012: SHB Đà Nẵng

Senior career*
Years	Team	Apps	(Gls)
2013–2015	SHB Đà Nẵng	35	(6)
2016–2017	Sài Gòn	6	(0)
2017–2020	SHB Đà Nẵng	62	(9)
2021–2022	Phú Thọ	21	(6)
2023–	Công An Hà Nội	18	(0)
2025–	→ Bắc Ninh (loan)	0	(0)

International career
2010–2011	Vietnam U16	2	(0)
2015–2015	Vietnam U23	3	(0)
- * Club domestic league appearances and goals as of 22 June 2025

Hồ Ngọc Thắng (born 10 February 1994) is a Vietnamese professional footballer who plays as a forward for V.League 2 club Bắc Ninh, on loan from V.League 1 club Công An Hà Nội.

In 2018, he married fellow footballer Phạm Hoàng Quỳnh.

== Honours ==
=== Club ===
Công An Hà Nội

- Vietnamese Cup: 2024–25

=== International ===
Vietnam U23

- (bronze) Bronze medal: Southeast Asian Games: 2015
