= Jairo Neto =

Brazilian footballer

Personal information
- Full name: Jairo Pinheiro Palmeira Neto
- Date of birth: 4 March 1994 (age 32)
- Place of birth: Camaçari, Brazil
- Height: 1.84 m (6 ft 1/2 in)
- Position: Forward

Team information
- Current team: Cabofriense

Youth career
- 2008: Assisense
- 2008: Bahia
- 2009: Vitória
- 2009: Cruzeiro
- 2010: Bahia
- 2010: Corinthians Alagoas
- 2011: Cruzeiro
- 2011: São Francisco
- 2012–2013: União Coimbra

Senior career*
Years	Team	Apps	(Gls)
2011–2012	Slovan Bratislava	0	(0)
2012–2013	União Coimbra	7	(2)
2015	Taliya		
2015	Cabofriense		
2016	Aparecidense		

International career^{‡}
2015	Timor-Leste U23	4	(1)
2015	Timor-Leste	6	(1)
- * Club domestic league appearances and goals ‡ National team caps and goals as of 13 October 2015

Jairo Pinheiro Palmeira Neto (born 4 March 1994), simply known as Jairo Neto, is a Brazilian footballer who plays as a forward.

Despite having no links with East Timor, he had been naturalised and played for the country's national team between 2015. On 19 January 2017, the Asian Football Confederation declared Jairo Neto and eleven other Brazilian men's footballers ineligible to represent East Timor. Two months later, the East Timorese passport he had received have been declared ‘null and void’ by the Ministry of Justice of East Timor.

== Career ==
Neto made his debut for Timor Leste in the first round of 2018 World Cup Qualifying against Mongolia, and scored on debut in their 4–1 victory.

=== International Goals ===
Correct as of 3 June 2015

==== under-23 ====
#	Date	Venue	Opponent	Score	Result	Competition
1.	3 June 2015	Bishan Stadium, Bishan, Singapore	Brunei	1–0	2–1	2015 Southeast Asian Games

==== Senior ====
Scores and results list East Timor's goal tally first.

#	Date	Venue	Opponent	Score	Result	Competition
1.	12 March 2015	National Stadium, Dili	Mongolia	4–0	4–1	2018 FIFA World Cup qualification
