= Sengdao Inthilath =

Laotian footballer

Personal information
- Full name: Sengdao Inthilath
- Date of birth: 3 June 1994 (age 32)
- Place of birth: Laos
- Height: 1.68 m (5 ft 6 in)
- Position: Defender

Senior career*
Years	Team	Apps	(Gls)
2014–2015	Yotha FC	0	(0)
2016-2017	Lanexang United	(30)	(0)

International career^{‡}
2014–	Laos U-23	3	(0)
2014–	Laos	13	(0)
- * Club domestic league appearances and goals as of 12:28, 23 November 2014 (UTC) ‡ National team caps and goals as of 12:28, 3 June 2017 2014 (UTC)

Sengdao Inthilath (born 3 June 1994) is a Laotian professional footballer who plays as a defender for Yotha FC in the Lao League. He made his national team debut on 16 July 2013.
