= Lê Thanh Bình =

Vietnamese footballer (born 1995)

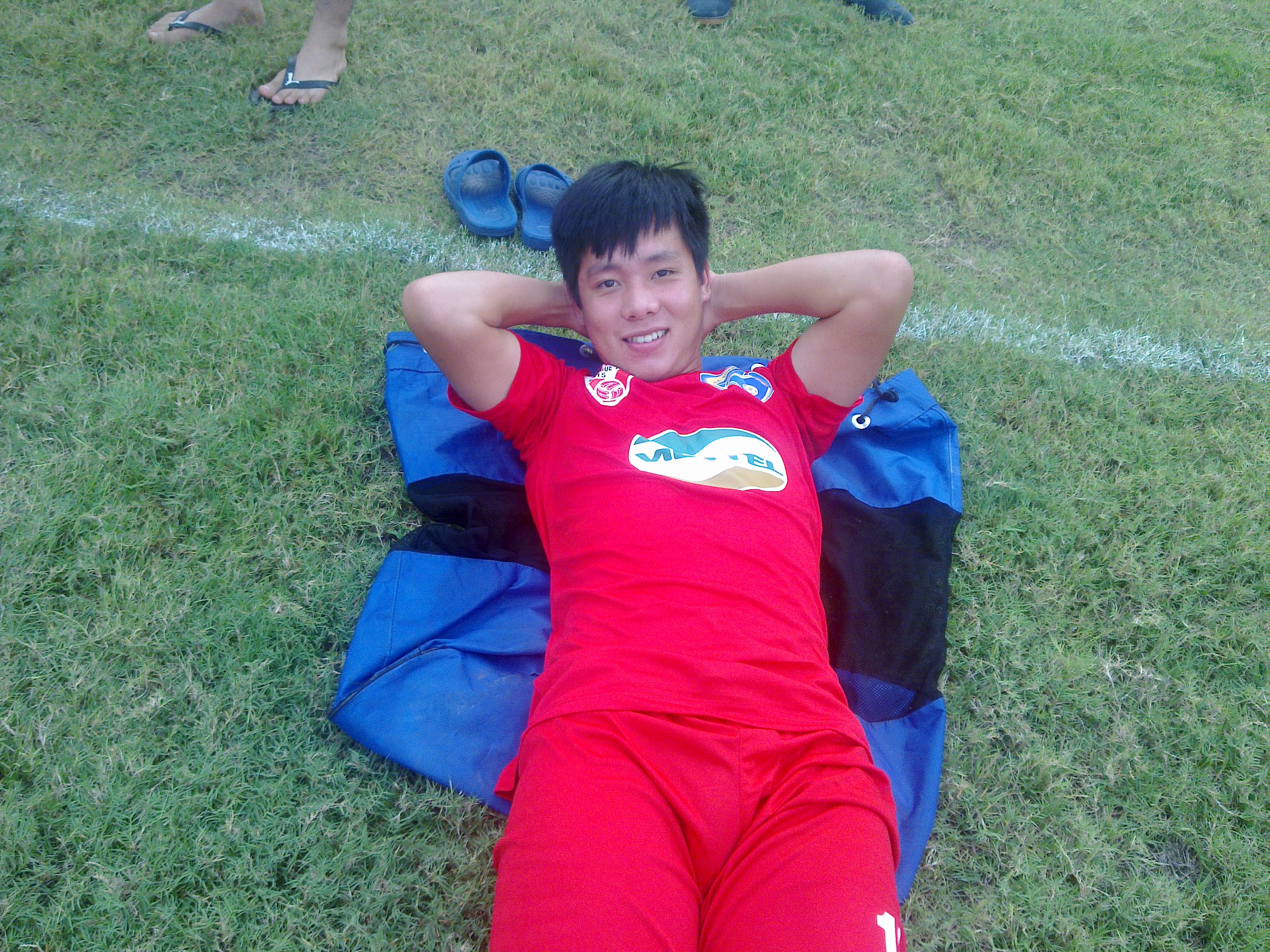

Personal information
- Full name: Lê Thanh Bình
- Date of birth: 8 August 1995 (age 31)
- Place of birth: Hoằng Hóa, Thanh Hóa, Vietnam
- Height: 1.76 m (5 ft 9 in)
- Position: Forward

Team information
- Current team: Đồng Nai City
- Number: 91

Youth career
- 2007–2013: Thanh Hóa

Senior career*
Years	Team	Apps	(Gls)
2014–2020	Thanh Hóa	63	(9)
2020	→ Bình Định (loan)	8	(6)
2021–2022	Topenland Bình Định	8	(0)
2022	→ Khánh Hòa (loan)	11	(8)
2023–2024	Đông Á Thanh Hóa	18	(2)
2024–	Đồng Nai City	30	(7)

International career
2015–2016	Vietnam U23	18	(6)
- * Club domestic league appearances and goals as of 3 May 2026

Lê Thanh Bình (born 8 August 1995) is a Vietnamese professional footballer who plays as a forward for V.League 1 club Đồng Nai City.

Thanh Bình was part of the Vietnam U23's squad that won bronze medal in the 2015 SEA Games. In 2022, after helping Khánh Hòa won the V.League 2, Thanh Bình won the league's Player of the Season award.

== International goals ==
#	Date	Venue	Opponent	Score	Result	Competition
1.	29 May 2015	Bishan, Bishan Stadium	Brunei	1–0	6-0	2015 Southeast Asian Games
2.	10 June 2015	Bishan, Bishan Stadium	Thailand	1–3	1-3	2015 Southeast Asian Games
3.	31 March 2015	Shah Alam, Shah Alam Stadium	Macau	2-0	7–0	2016 AFC U-23 Championship qualification
4.	31 March 2015	Shah Alam, Shah Alam Stadium	Macau	3-0	7–0	2016 AFC U-23 Championship qualification
5.	31 March 2015	Shah Alam, Shah Alam Stadium	Macau	5-0	7–0	2016 AFC U-23 Championship qualification
6.	21 July 2017	Ho Chi Minh City, Thống Nhất Stadium	Macau	1-0	8–1	2018 AFC U-23 Championship qualification
7.	21 July 2017	Ho Chi Minh City, Thống Nhất Stadium	Macau	4-0	8–1	2018 AFC U-23 Championship qualification

== Honours ==
Bình Định

- V.League 2: 2020

Khánh Hòa

- V.League 2: 2022

Thanh Hóa

- Vietnamese National Cup: 2023, 2023–24

Trường Tươi Đồng Nai

- V.League 2: 2025–26

Vietnam U23

- SEA Games bronze medal: 2015

Individual

- V.League 2 Player of the Year: 2022
