= Phí Minh Long =

Vietnamese footballer

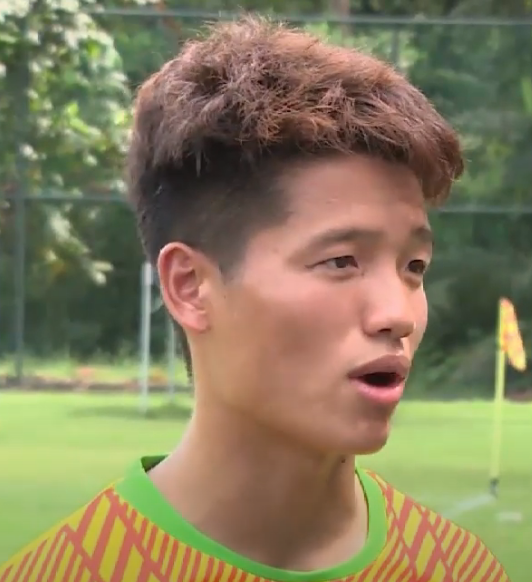
- Minh Long in 2017

Personal information
- Full name: Phí Minh Long
- Date of birth: 11 February 1995 (age 31)
- Place of birth: Hoài Đức, Hanoi, Vietnam
- Height: 1.80 m (5 ft 11 in)
- Position: Goalkeeper

Team information
- Current team: Thể Công–Viettel
- Number: 33

Youth career
- 2008–2014: Hà Nội T&T

Senior career*
Years	Team	Apps	(Gls)
2015–2021	Hà Nội	18	(0)
2021–2022	→ Quảng Nam (loan)	6	(0)
2023–2026	PVF-CAND	68	(0)
2026–	Thể Công–Viettel	0	(0)

International career^{‡}
2014–2015	Vietnam U19	23	(0)
2016–2017	Vietnam U23	21	(0)
2017	Vietnam	1	(0)
Medal record
Men's football
Representing Vietnam
Southeast Asian Games
Bronze medal – third place	2015 Singapore	Team
- * Club domestic league appearances and goals as of 12 June 2026 ‡ National team caps and goals as of 22 March 2017

Phí Minh Long (born 11 February 1995) is a Vietnamese professional footballer who plays as a goalkeeper for V.League 1 club Thể Công–Viettel.

Formerly an international from under-19 to under-23 level, Minh Long was called up to the national team in 2017 and made his senior debut in a friendly match against Chinese Taipei on 22 March 2017.

== Club career ==
=== Hà Nội ===
Minh Long came through the Hà Nội T&T Youth Football Training Center. He was promoted to the first team in 2015. On 22 May 2016, Minh Long made his debut for Hà Nội T&T's first team when he started in a 3–0 win over Quảng Nam.

After a loan spell at Quảng Nam, he returned to Hà Nội. However, Minh Long was not registered to play in the 2023 V.League 1 and expressed his desire to leave the club.

=== Loan at Quảng Nam ===
In May 2021, Minh Long was loaned to Quảng Nam for the 2021 season. After the 2021 season was canceled due to the impact of the COVID-19 pandemic, he continued to stick with Quảng Nam for one more season. In the 2022 season, he was the substitute goalkeeper for Tống Đức An, playing a total of 6 matches in V.League 2 and 2 matches in the National Cup.

=== PVF-CAND ===
At the end of February 2023, he went to work at PVF-CAND. On April 2, Minh Long made his PVF-CAND debut when he caught the match against SHB Đà Nẵng in the first round of the 2023 Vietnamese Cup. In this match, he played excellently and became the hero of the home team when he successfully saved 2 penalty kicks to help PVF-CAND advance. Four days later, he continued to be the main player in the 1–0 victory at Hòa Bình's field in the first round of the 2023 V.League 2.

=== Thể Công–Viettel ===
On 21 August 2026, Minh Long joined V.League 1 side Thể Công–Viettel.

== International career ==
=== 2014 AFC U-19 Championship ===
In the last 2 matches of the group stage against Japan and China U19, Minh Long was assigned as the main goalkeeper. He was chosen to replace Lê Văn Trường in the match against Japan. With excellent saves, Minh Long was praised by coach Guillaume Graechen after the game.

=== Disaster at 2017 SEA Games ===
Minh Long was included in Vietnam U22 squad for the 2017 SEA Games. On 24 August, in the final match of group stage against U22 Thailand, he handled the ball with his hands in the penalty area after a pass from teammate. Due to this mistake, U22 Thailand got an indirect free kick, and Phitiwat Sukjitthammakul scored the opening goal. Later, he made another mistake, jumping off the ground and kicked his defender straight into the face, which led to Thailand's second goal. Vietnam eventually lost 0-3 and was eliminated. He was heavily criticized by the media and since then has never gotten a chance to play for the national team at any level.

== Career statistics ==
=== Club ===
As of match played 29 June 2024

Appearances and goals by club, season and competition
Club	Season	League			Cup		Asia		Other		Total	
Club	Season	Division	Apps	Goals	Apps	Goals	Apps	Goals	Apps	Goals	Apps	Goals
Hà Nội	2015	V.League 1	0	0	0	0	0	0	—		0	0
Hà Nội	2016	V.League 1	8	0	3	0	0	0	—		11	0
Hà Nội	2017	V.League 1	2	0	0	0	2 (Note: Appearances in AFC Cup)	0	—		4	0
Hà Nội	2018	V.League 1	7	0	4	0	0	0	—		11	0
Hà Nội	2019	V.League 1	1	0	2	0	0	0	0	0	3	0
Hà Nội	2020	V.League 1	0	0	0	0	—		0	0	0	0
Hà Nội	2021	V.League 1	0	0	0	0	—		—		0	0
Hà Nội	Total		18	0	9	0	2	0	0	0	29	0
Quảng Nam (loan)	2021	V.League 2	0	0	0	0	—		—		0	0
Quảng Nam (loan)	2022	V.League 2	6	0	2	0	—		—		8	0
Quảng Nam (loan)	Total		6	0	2	0	0	0	0	0	8	0
PVF-CAND	2023	V.League 2	13	0	1	0	—		—		14	0
PVF-CAND	2023–24	V.League 2	18	0	1	0	—		1	0	20	0
PVF-CAND	2024–25	V.League 2	0	0	0	0	—		0	0	0	0
PVF-CAND	Total		31	0	2	0	0	0	1	0	34	0
Career total			55	0	13	0	2	0	1	0	71	0

=== International ===
Appearances and goals by national team and year
National team	Year	Apps	Goals
Vietnam	2017	1	0
Total		1	0

== Honours ==
Hà Nội

- V.League 1: 2016, 2018, 2019
- Vietnamese National Cup: 2019, 2020
- Vietnamese Super Cup: 2019, 2020, 2021

PVF-CAND

- V.League 2 runner-up: 2023
- Vietnamese Cup third place : 2023

Vietnam U23

- Southeast Asian Games bronze medal: 2015
