= Vũ Ngọc Thịnh =

Vietnamese footballer

Personal information
- Full name: Vũ Ngọc Thịnh
- Date of birth: July 8, 1992 (age 34)
- Place of birth: Hải Phòng, Vietnam
- Height: 1.81 m (5 ft 11 in)
- Position: Centre-back

Youth career
- 2003–2010: Hải Phòng

Senior career*
Years	Team	Apps	(Gls)
2011–2018	Hải Phòng	56	(0)
2012	→ Hồ Chí Minh City (loan)	17	(0)
2013	→ Bình Định (loan)	20	(0)
2018–2020	Hồ Chí Minh City	14	(1)
2021	SHB Đà Nẵng	1	(0)
2022	Hải Phòng	2	(0)

International career
2015–2016	Vietnam U23	2	(0)
2016–2017	Vietnam	6	(0)
- * Club domestic league appearances and goals

Vũ Ngọc Thịnh (born 8 July 1992) is a Vietnamese footballer who plays as a centre-back for V.League 1 side Hải Phòng.

== Honours ==
=== International ===
Vietnam U23

(bronze) Third place : Southeast Asian Games: 2015
