= Phạm Mạnh Hùng =

Vietnamese footballer

Personal information
- Full name: Phạm Mạnh Hùng
- Date of birth: March 3, 1993 (age 33)
- Place of birth: Nghĩa Đàn, Nghệ An, Vietnam
- Height: 1.73 m (5 ft 8 in)
- Positions: Centre-back; left back

Team information
- Current team: Đông Á Thanh Hóa
- Number: 5

Youth career
- 2006–2010: Sông Lam Nghệ An

Senior career*
| Years | Team | Apps | (Gls) |
| 2011–2018 | Sông Lam Nghệ An | 87 | (2) |
| 2019 | SHB Đà Nẵng | 10 | (0) |
| 2020–2021 | Hải Phòng | 28 | (0) |
| 2022 | Nam Định | 20 | (1) |
| 2023 | Hải Phòng | 18 | (0) |
| 2024– | Đông Á Thanh Hóa | 3 | (0) |

International career
| 2012–2014 | Vietnam U21 | 10 | (2) |
| 2013–2015 | Vietnam U23 | 11 | (2) |
| 2014–2017 | Vietnam | 3 | (0) |
- * Club domestic league appearances and goals as of 23 June 2018

Phạm Mạnh Hùng (born 3 March 1993) is a Vietnamese footballer who plays as a centre-back for V.League 1 club Đông Á Thanh Hóa and the Vietnam national football team.

On March 27, 2015, in the match between U-23 Vietnam and U-23 Malaysia in the AFC U-23 Championship qualification round at Shah Alam Stadium, player Pham Manh Hung took two free kicks but both shots hit the crossbar and did not enter the goal. Because of this, he was nicknamed "Hùng xà ngang" (Hung Crossbar) by fans.

== Club career ==
Pham Manh Hung came through the youth academy of Song Lam Nghe An. At the age of 17, he won the "best player" award at the 2010 National U17 Finals. In 2013, Pham Manh Hung was promoted to the first team of Song Lam Nghe An. However, he did not make many contributions during his time with the club.

At the end of the 2018 season, Pham Manh Hung was not offered a contract extension by Song Lam Nghe An. He then moved to SHB Da Nang, signing a 3-year contract. Pham Manh Hung joined Hai Phong at the start of the 2020 season.

== International career ==
=== U-23 ===
| # | Date | Venue | Opponent | Score | Result | Competition |
|---|---|---|---|---|---|---|
| 1 | 15 December 2013 | Zayarthiri Stadium, Naypyitaw, Myanmar | Laos | 1-0 | 5-0 | 2013 Southeast Asian Games |
| 2 | 29 May 2015 | Bishan Stadium, Singapore | Brunei | 6–0 | 6–0 | 2015 Southeast Asian Games |

== Honours ==
=== International ===
Vietnam U23

(bronze) Third place : Southeast Asian Games: 2015
