= Maitee Hatsady =

Laotian footballer

Personal information
- Full name: Maitee Hatsady
- Birth name: Maitee Sihalath
- Date of birth: 10 June 1998 (age 28)
- Place of birth: Laos
- Height: 1.65 m (5 ft 5 in)
- Position: Attacking midfielder

Youth career
- Lao Toyota

Senior career*
Years	Team	Apps	(Gls)
2015–2017	Lao Toyota		

International career^{‡}
2014	Laos U-17	4	(1)
2015–2017	Laos U-21	5	(0)
2016–2017	Laos	4	(0)
- * Club domestic league appearances and goals as of 7 June 2014 ‡ National team caps and goals as of 18 October 2016

Maitee Hatsady (born as Maitee Sihalath on 10 June 1998 and simply known by his first name) is a Laotian footballer who played as an attacking midfielder. He was banned for life from all football-related activities as a result of match-fixing, along with 21 other players of his club Lao Toyota and the national team.

== Club career ==
Maitee played for Lao Toyota from 2015 to 2017. In a match against Ayeyawady United at the 2015 AFC Cup, he scored an impressive 30-yard free kick, although Lao Toyota eventually lost 4-3.

== International career ==
Maitee made his senior international debut in 2016 against Nepal, although he had been called up at the age of 16 for the 2014 AFF Championship without making an appearance.
