= Eusebio de Almeida =

East Timorese footballer

Personal information
- Full name: Eusebio Hermenio Correia de Almeida
- Date of birth: 9 June 1985 (age 41)
- Place of birth: Dili, East Timor, Indonesia
- Height: 1.69 m (5 ft 6 1/2 in)
- Position: Midfielder

Team information
- Current team: FC Porto Taibesi
- Number: 8

Senior career*
Years	Team	Apps	(Gls)
2005–2015	FC Porto Taibesi	95	(57)
2015	Hong Ngai		
2016–2017	FC Porto Taibesi		
2017–	Atlético Ultramar		

International career^{‡}
2007–2015	Timor-Leste	22	(0)
- * Club domestic league appearances and goals ‡ National team caps and goals as of 29 May 2016

Eusebio Hermenio Correia de Almeida, simply known as Ebi (born June 9, 1985) is a football player. He is the current midfielder for the Timor-Leste national football team.
