= Ezequiel Fernandes =

East Timorese footballer

Personal information
- Full name: Ezequiel Fernandes dos Santos
- Date of birth: 8 April 1996 (age 30)
- Place of birth: Timor Leste
- Height: 1.83 m (6 ft 0 in)
- Position: Defender

Team information
- Current team: FC Porto Taibesi

Senior career*
Years	Team	Apps	(Gls)
??–2014	Tigres Maubara		
2015–17	Teouma Academy		
2017–	FC Porto Taibesi		

International career^{‡}
2011	Timor-Leste U-16	4	(0)
2013	Timor-Leste U-19	5	(0)
2014–	Timor-Leste U-23	11	(1)
2014–	Timor-Leste	3	(0)
- * Club domestic league appearances and goals ‡ National team caps and goals as of 29 May 2016

Ezequiel Fernandes dos Santos (born 8 April 1996), also known as Ezequiel, is a football player who currently plays for Timor-Leste national football team.

== International career ==
Ezequiel made his senior international debut against Brunei national football team in the 2014 AFF Suzuki Cup qualification on 12 October 2014.
