= Frangcyatma Alves =

East Timorese footballer

Personal information
- Full name: Frangcyatma Alves Ima Kefi
- Date of birth: 27 January 1997 (age 29)
- Place of birth: Dili, Timor Timur, Indonesia
- Height: 1.65 m (5 ft 5 in)
- Position: Forward

Team information
- Current team: DIT F.C.

Senior career*
Years	Team	Apps	(Gls)
2014–2016	Persiku Dynamo Kupang		
2016–	DIT F.C.		

International career^{‡}
2013–2014	Timor-Leste U-19	7	(3)
2015	Timor-Leste U-21	?	(?)
2014–2019	Timor-Leste U-23	11	(1)
2015–	Timor-Leste	10	(0)
- * Club domestic league appearances and goals ‡ National team caps and goals as of 11 June 2019

Frangcyatma Alves Ima Kefi (born 27 January 1997) is a football player who currently plays as forward for Pro Liga de Timor Leste club DIT FC and Timor-Leste national football team. He used to play for Persiku Dynamo Kupang in Indonesia.

== International career ==
Carlos made his senior international debut in a 0-2 loss against Cambodia in an exhibition match on 29 May 2016.
