= Efrem Santos =

East Timorese former footballer

Personal information
- Full name: Efrem Marianus Almeida Santos Jeronimo
- Date of birth: 10 June 1994 (age 32)
- Place of birth: Timor-Leste
- Position: Forward

Senior career*
Years	Team	Apps	(Gls)
2014–2015	Jeonju Citizen FC		

International career
2010	Timor-Leste	1	(0)
- * Club domestic league appearances and goals

Efrem Marianus Almeida Santos Jeronimo (born 10 June 1994) is an East Timorese former footballer who is last known to have played as a attacker for Jeonju Citizen FC.

== Career ==
=== Club career ===
Before the 2014 season, Marianus Almeida Santos Jeronimo signed for South Korean fourth tier side Jeonju Citizen FC after starring in film A Barefoot Dream, where he suffered injuries.

=== International career ===
At the age of 16, he debuted for Timor-Leste.
