= Anggisu Barbosa =

East Timorese footballer

Personal information
- Full name: Anggisu Correia de Almeida Barbosa
- Date of birth: 16 March 1993 (age 33)
- Place of birth: Dili, East Timor, Indonesia
- Height: 1.68 m (5 ft 6 in)
- Positions: Striker; midfielder

Team information
- Current team: Porto Taibesse
- Number: 11

Youth career
- –2008: Porto Taibesse

Senior career*
Years	Team	Apps	(Gls)
2008–2013	Porto Taibesse		
2014–2015	Sriracha		
2016	Pattaya City		
2017–2018	AS Académica		(7)
2018–	Atlético Ultramar		

International career
2009–2012	Timor-Leste U-19	8	(1)
2011–2017	Timor-Leste U-23	16	(0)
2008–2016	Timor-Leste	30	(4)
- * Club domestic league appearances and goals

Anggisu Correia de Almeida Barbosa (born 16 March 1993) is a football player, currently playing as a forward for the Timor-Leste national football team. He is the second youngest player to make his debut with the Timor-Leste national football team at the age of 15 years and 217 days, with the youngest being Adelino Trindade, who made his debut at the age of 15 years and 172 days.

== International career ==
Barbosa made his senior international debut in the 2008 AFF Championship qualification against Cambodia on 19 October 2008 when he was aged 15 years 217 days, he also scored his first international goals in that match.

== Career statistics ==
=== International appearances ===
Appearances and goals by national team and year
National team	Year	Apps	Goals
Timor-Leste	2008	3	1
Timor-Leste	2009	0	0
Timor-Leste	2010	4	1
Timor-Leste	2011	2	0
Timor-Leste	2012	4	0
Timor-Leste	2013	0	0
Timor-Leste	2014	4	1
Timor-Leste	2015	6	0
Timor-Leste	2016	7	1
Timor-Leste	Total	30	4

=== International goals ===
#	Date	Venue	Opponent	Score	Result	Competition
1.	19 October 2008	Olympic Stadium, Phnom Penh, Cambodia	Cambodia	1–0	2–2	2008 AFF Championship qualification
2.	24 October 2010	New Laos National Stadium, Vientiane, Laos	Cambodia	2–4	2–4	2010 AFF Championship qualification
3.	16 October 2014	New Laos National Stadium, Vientiane, Laos	Cambodia	1–0	2–3	2014 AFF Championship qualification
4.	21 October 2016	Olympic Stadium, Phnom Penh, Cambodia	Cambodia	1–2	2–3	2016 AFF Championship qualification

== Honours ==
Atlético Ultramar

- Taça 12 de Novembro: 2018
