= Leonel (footballer) =

East Timorese footballer

Personal information
- Full name: Leonel Joaquim da Silva Araujo
- Date of birth: 5 July 1986 (age 40)
- Place of birth: Timor-Leste
- Height: 1.72 m (5 ft 7 1/2 in)
- Position: Goalkeeper

Team information
- Current team: FC Porto Taibesi
- Number: 1

Senior career*
Years	Team	Apps	(Gls)
2005–	FC Porto Taibesi	?	(0)

International career
2008–2011	Timor-Leste	5	(0)
- * Club domestic league appearances and goals

Leonel Joaquim da Silva Araujo, known as just Leonel (born July 5, 1986) is a football player. He is the current goalkeeper for the Timor-Leste national football team.
