= Nataniel Reis =

East Timorese footballer

Personal information
- Full name: Nataniel de Jesus Reis
- Date of birth: 25 March 1995 (age 31)
- Place of birth: Dili, Indonesia (now East Timor)
- Height: 1.74 m (5 ft 8 1/2 in)
- Position: Midfielder

Team information
- Current team: FC Porto Taibesi

Senior career*
Years	Team	Apps	(Gls)
2014–	FC Porto Taibesi		

International career^{‡}
2010	Timor-Leste U-16	6	(4)
2013–2014	Timor-Leste U-19	5	(1)
2014	Timor-Leste U-21		
2012–2018	Timor-Leste U-23	11	(0)
2014–	Timor-Leste	22	(1)
- * Club domestic league appearances and goals ‡ National team caps and goals as of 17 November 2018

Nataniel de Jesus Reis (born 25 March 1995), also known as Nataniel Reis, is an East Timorese football player who currently plays for Timor-Leste national football team.

== International career ==
Reis made his senior international debut against Mongolia national football team in the second-leg 2018 FIFA World Cup qualification (AFC) on 17 March 2015.

=== International goals ===
Scores and results list East Timor's goal tally first.

No.	Date	Venue	Opponent	Score	Result	Competition
1.	17 November 2018	Kuala Lumpur Stadium, Kuala Lumpur, Malaysia	Philippines	1–3	2–3	2018 AFF Championship
