= Stephen Ng (footballer) =

Singaporean footballer and coach

Stephen Ng Heng Seng
Personal information
- Place of birth: Singapore
- Position: Goalkeeper

International career
| Years | Team | Apps | (Gls) |
| 1990s | Singapore | | |

Managerial career
- 2012: Gombak United (assistant)
- 2013: Brunei U16
- 2015: Brunei U23
- 2016: Brunei U14
- 2017: Brunei U15
- 2019: Brunei U23
- 2019: Brunei U19
- 2021–2022: Singapore women

Stephen Ng Heng Seng is a Singaporean football coach and former footballer. He is also an AFC instructor for coaches as well. Ng is formerly the national coach for the Singapore women's national team.

== Coaching career ==
=== Brunei ===
==== Youth ====
Leading the Brunei Under-16 in their 2014 AFC U-16 Championship qualification campaign which ran from 21 to 29 September 2013, Heng Seng returned to coach the Brunei Under-14s in 2016 for the AFC U14 Regional Festival of Football, prophesying a good run in the competition. The Singaporean also took the reins of the Brunei U15 in 2017, taking them to their first ever win in the AFF U-15 Championship that year, beating Cambodia 2-0. He also coached the Under-15s in their 2018 AFC U-16 Championship qualifiers.

In his opinion, the Brunei National Under-16 Youth League has benefits for youth players development for the reason that it will expose them to competitive matches.

==== Under-23 ====
As head coach of the Brunei Olympic team in 2015 for their 2016 AFC U-23 Championship qualification campaign, Heng Seng blamed a narrow 2-0 loss to Indonesia on a fortuitous strike by Ahmad Noviandani in the 71st minute, claiming it was unintended. He was manager of the Olympic team in the 2015 SEA Games as well, stating that his team prepared well for the competition and their first group stage clash countering Vietnam.

Ng was designated head coach of the under-23s for the 2020 AFC U-23 Championship qualification matches held in late March 2019 in Vietnam. Unfortunately he has now been mistaken for assistant Darus Tanjong due to the latter taking press conferences instead of Ng.

=== Singapore ===
In 2021, Ng was appointed at the Singapore women's national football team's head coach for two years. The Lionesses proceeded to register their first win in nearly 37 years by defeating Laos 1-0 at the 2021 SEA Games. They had not won a match at the SEA Games since 1985.

On 13 July 2022, the Lionesses claimed their first victory at the AFF Women's Championship in 18 years by defeating a depleted Indonesia side 2-0 at Binan Football Stadium in Manila. Indonesia could name only four substitutes as nine players were unwell. The team finished fourth with four points in the six-team Group A.

On 14 October 2022, the Football Association of Singapore (FAS) announced that by mutual agreement, Ng would step down from his role as Singapore Women’s National Team Head Coach with effect 31 October 2022. Former international Ratna Suffian, who served as Ng’s assistant, took over as the interim coach.
