= Adelino Trindade =

East Timorese footballer

Personal information
- Full name: Adelino Trindade Coelho Manek de Oliveira Reis
- Date of birth: 2 June 1995 (age 31)
- Place of birth: Baucau, East Timor, Indonesia
- Height: 1.65 m (5 ft 5 in)
- Position: Midfielder

Team information
- Current team: Karketu Dili

Youth career
- 2005–2009: SEJD

Senior career*
Years	Team	Apps	(Gls)
2010–2012	AD Baucau	10	
2012–2015	Dili United		
2016–2018	AS Ponta Leste		
2019–	Karketu Dili		

International career^{‡}
2009–2010	Timor-Leste U-16	8	(1)
2013–2014	Timor-Leste U-19	6	(5)
2013–2017	Timor-Leste U-23	11	(0)
2010–2018	Timor-Leste	27	(3)
- * Club domestic league appearances and goals as of May 01, 2014 ‡ National team caps and goals as of 11 June 2019

Adelino Trindade Coelho Manek de Oliveira Reis (born 2 June 1995), simply known as Adelino or Ade, is an East Timorese footballer who plays as a midfielder for Liga Futebol Timor-Leste club Karketu Dili.

== International career ==
Adelino made his senior international debut on 21 November 2010 in a friendly match against Indonesia, becoming the youngest player to make his debut for the Timor-Leste national team at 15 years 172 days.

=== International goals ===
Scores and results list Timor-Leste's goal tally first.

#	Date	Venue	Opponent	Score	Result	Competition
1.	5 October 2012	Thuwunna Stadium, Yangon	Cambodia	3–0	5–1	2012 AFF Championship qualification
2.	5 October 2012	Thuwunna Stadium, Yangon	Cambodia	4–0	5–1	2012 AFF Championship qualification
3.	9 October 2012	Thuwunna Stadium, Yangon	Laos	2–0	3–1	2012 AFF Championship qualification
