= Henrique Cruz =

East Timorese footballer

Personal information
- Full name: Henrique Wilsons Da Cruz Martins
- Date of birth: 6 December 1997 (age 28)
- Place of birth: Dili, East Timor, Indonesia
- Height: 1.81 m (5 ft 11 1/2 in)
- Position: Striker

Team information
- Current team: Coração FC

Senior career*
| Years | Team | Apps | (Gls) |
| 2014 | Teouma Academy | | |
| 2015 | DIT FC | | |
| 2026 | Coração FC | | |

International career^{‡}
| 2013–2016 | Timor-Leste U-19 | 5 | (0) |
| 2012–2019 | Timor-Leste U-23 | 10 | (3) |
| 2015– | Timor-Leste | 19 | (3) |
- * Club domestic league appearances and goals ‡ National team caps and goals as of 1 September 2018

Henrique Wilsons Da Cruz Martins (born 6 December 1997), also known as Henrique Cruz, is a football player who currently plays for the Liga Futebol Timor-Leste side Coração FC. He has previously played for the Timor-Leste national football team.

== International career ==
Henrique made his senior international debut in the match against Mongolia in the 2018 FIFA World Cup qualification (AFC) on 12 March 2015.

=== International goals ===
Scores and results list East Timor's goal tally first.

| No | Date | Venue | Opponent | Score | Result | Competition |
|---|---|---|---|---|---|---|
| 1. | 3 December 2017 | Taipei Municipal Stadium, Taipei, Taiwan | Laos | 1–2 | 1–2 | 2017 CTFA International Tournament |
| 2. | 1 September 2018 | Kuala Lumpur Stadium, Kuala Lumpur, Malaysia | Brunei | 1–0 | 3–1 | 2018 AFF Championship qualification |
| 3. | 1 September 2018 | Kuala Lumpur Stadium, Kuala Lumpur, Malaysia | Brunei | 2–0 | 3–1 | 2018 AFF Championship qualification |
