= Agostinho (footballer, born 1997) =

East Timorese footballer

Personal information
- Full name: Agostinho da Silva Araujo
- Date of birth: 28 August 1997 (age 29)
- Place of birth: Dili, Indonesia (now Timor-Leste)
- Height: 1.83 m (6 ft 0 in)
- Position: Defender

Team information
- Current team: FC Porto Taibesse

International career^{‡}
Years	Team	Apps	(Gls)
2011	Timor-Leste U-16	2	(1)
2013–	Timor-Leste U-19	3	(0)
2014–	Timor-Leste U-21		
2012–	Timor-Leste U-23	16	(1)
2015–	Timor-Leste	6	(0)
- ‡ National team caps and goals as of 13 October 2015

Agostinho da Silva Araujo (born 28 August 1997), also known as Agostinho, is a football player who currently plays for Timor-Leste national football team.

== International career ==
Agostinho made his senior international debut against Mongolia national football team in the 2018 FIFA World Cup qualification (AFC) on 12 March 2015.
