= Ramos Maxanches =

East Timorese footballer

Personal information
- Full name: Ramos Saozinho Ribeiro Maxanches
- Date of birth: 12 April 1994 (age 32)
- Place of birth: East Timor, Indonesia
- Height: 1.83 m (6 ft 0 in)
- Position: Goalkeeper

Team information
- Current team: Ponta Leste

Senior career*
Years	Team	Apps	(Gls)
2011–2015	FC Porto Taibesi	57	(0)
2015–2017	Aviacao Timor		
2018–	Ponta Leste		

International career^{‡}
2010	Timor-Leste U-16	7	(0)
2011–2015	Timor-Leste U-23	18	(0)
2012–2017	Timor-Leste	20	(0)
- * Club domestic league appearances and goals ‡ National team caps and goals as of 21 October 2016

Ramos Saozinho Ribeiro Maxanches (born 12 April 1994), also known as Ramos Maxanches, is a football player who currently plays as goalkeeper for Timor-Leste national football team.

== International career ==
Ramos made his senior international debut against Brunei national football team in the 2014 AFF Suzuki Cup qualification on 12 October 2014.
