= Filipe Oliveira (footballer, born 1995) =

East Timorese footballer

Personal information
- Full name: Filipe Moriera Oliveira
- Date of birth: 14 May 1995 (age 31)
- Place of birth: Timor Timur, Indonesia (now Timor-Leste)
- Height: 1.84 m (6 ft 0 in)
- Position: Defender

Team information
- Current team: Sport Laulara e Benfica

Senior career*
Years	Team	Apps	(Gls)
2014–2015	Real Ermera Lions		
2015–2016	DIT FC		
2016–	SL Benfica		

International career^{‡}
2010	Timor-Leste U-16	7	(3)
2014	Timor-Leste U-21		
2012–2017	Timor-Leste U-23	14	(0)
2015–2017	Timor-Leste	20	(0)
- * Club domestic league appearances and goals as of 25 November 2016 ‡ National team caps and goals as of 5 November 2016

Filipe Oliveira (born 14 May 1995), also known as Filipe, is a football player who currently plays for Timor-Leste national football team.

== International career ==
Filipe made his senior international debut against Mongolia national football team in the 2018 FIFA World Cup qualification (AFC) on 12 March 2015.

== Honours ==
=== Benfica ===
- LFA Super Taça Runner-up: 2016
