= Jorge Sabas Victor =

East Timorese footballer

Victor
Personal information
- Full name: Jorge Sabas Victor
- Date of birth: 5 December 1997 (age 28)
- Place of birth: East Timor, Indonesia
- Height: 1.76 m (5 ft 9 1/2 in)
- Positions: Defender; midfielder; defensive midfielder

Team information
- Current team: Vemasse Python

Senior career*
Years	Team	Apps	(Gls)
2013–2015	Persiku Dynamo Kupang	72	(34)
2015	Vemasse Python		

International career^{‡}
2010–2016	Timor-Leste U-19	6	(0)
2014	Timor-Leste U-21		
2014–2019	Timor-Leste U-23	10	(0)
2015–	Timor-Leste	15	(0)
- * Club domestic league appearances and goals ‡ National team caps and goals as of 11 June 2019

Jorge Sabas Victor (born 5 December 1997) also known as Victor, is a football player who currently plays as defender for Timor-Leste national football team.

== International career ==
Victor made his senior international debut is in a 7-0 loss against Saudi Arabia national football team in the 2018 FIFA World Cup qualification on 3 September 2015.
