= Nilo Soares =

East Timorese footballer

Nilo
Personal information
- Full name: Nicolau Higinio Baptista Soares Fernandes
- Date of birth: 18 July 1994 (age 32)
- Place of birth: Dili, Timor Timur, Indonesia (now Timor Leste)
- Height: 1.70 m (5 ft 7 in)
- Position: Midfielder

Team information
- Current team: Karketu Dili
- Number: 21

Youth career
- 2004–2008: SEJD

Senior career*
Years	Team	Apps	(Gls)
2009–2010	Ad. Dili Leste	6	
2011	A.D. Baucau	10	(4)
2012–2014	SLB Dili	28	(9)
2015	Jeonju FC	5	(0)
2016–	Karketu Dili	0	(0)

International career^{‡}
2009–2010	Timor-Leste U-16	7	(1)
2010–	Timor-Leste U-23	18	(0)
2010–	Timor-Leste	7	(0)
- * Club domestic league appearances and goals ‡ National team caps and goals as of 7 June 2016

Nilo Soares (born July 18, 1994) is an East Timorese footballer who plays as midfielder for Karketu Dili and the Timor-Leste national team.
