= Timor-Leste national under-19 football team =

Timor-Leste
- Nickname(s): O Sol Nascente (The Raising Sun), The Little Samba Nation, El Lafaek
- Association: Federação de Futebol de Timor-Leste
- Confederation: AFC (Asia)
- Head coach: Gopalkrishnan Ramasamy
- Captain: Cristevao Fernandes
- Most caps: Candido Monteiro de Oliveira (18)
- Top scorer: Adelino Trindade; Frangcyatma Alves (5)
- Home stadium: East Timor National Stadium
- FIFA code: TLS
First colours	Second colours

First international
- Maldives 2–2 Timor-Leste (Palembang, Indonesia; 6 August 2005)

Biggest win
- Timor-Leste 7–2 Brunei (Thủ Dầu Một, Vietnam; 6 August 2019)

Biggest defeat
- Malaysia 7–1 Timor-Leste (Ho Chi Minh City, Vietnam; 6 August 2009)

The Timor-Leste national Under-20 football team is the national team of Timor-Leste and is controlled by the Federação de Futebol de Timor-Leste. East Timor joined FIFA on 12 September 2005, but has never had success on the international stage.

== Kits ==
Timor-Leste 's kit is a red jersey, red shorts and red socks. Their away kit is with a white jersey with black shorts and red or white socks. The kits are currently manufactured by Adidas and Nike. Timor-Leste first kit is under Tiger, when the team play for the 2004 Tiger Cup. The first kit is red jersey, black shorts and red sock and their away kit is white jersey with two black sleeves, black short and white socks.

== Results and Fixtures ==
International Matches in last 12 months, and future scheduled matches

Win Draw Loss

== Competition records ==
=== FIFA U-20 World Cup record ===
FIFA U-20 World Cup
Year	Round	Pld	W	D	L	GF	GA	GD
(Tunisia) 1977	Part of Indonesia							
(Japan) 1979	Part of Indonesia							
(Australia) 1981	Part of Indonesia							
(Mexico) 1983	Part of Indonesia							
(Soviet Union) 1985	Part of Indonesia							
(Chile) 1987	Part of Indonesia							
(Saudi Arabia) 1989	Part of Indonesia							
(Portugal) 1991	Part of Indonesia							
(Australia) 1993	Part of Indonesia							
(Qatar) 1995	Part of Indonesia							
(Malaysia) 1997	Part of Indonesia							
(Nigeria) 1999	did not exist, under United Nations							
(Argentina) 2001	did not exist, under United Nations							
(United Arab Emirates) 2003	Not member of FIFA							
(Netherlands) 2005	did not enter							
(Canada) 2007	Withdrew							
(Egypt) 2009	Disqualified							
(Colombia) 2011	did not enter							
(Turkey) 2013	did not enter							
(New Zealand) 2015	did not enter							
(South Korea) 2017	did not qualify							
(Poland) 2019	did not qualify							
(Indonesia) 2021	Cancelled							
(Argentina) 2023	did not qualify							
(Chile) 2025	did not qualify							
(Azerbaijan) (Uzbekistan) 2027	to be determined							
Total	–	0/25	0	0	0	0	0	0

=== AFC U-19 Championship record ===
AFC U-20 Asian Cup record									Qualification record					
Year	Round	Pos	Pld	W	D	L	GF	GA	Pld	W	D	L	GF	GA
(Malaysia) 1959	Part of Portugal								Part of Portugal					
(Malaysia) 1960	Part of Portugal								Part of Portugal					
(Thailand) 1961	Part of Portugal								Part of Portugal					
(Thailand) 1962	Part of Portugal								Part of Portugal					
(Malaysia) 1963	Part of Portugal								Part of Portugal					
(South Vietnam) 1964	Part of Portugal								Part of Portugal					
(Japan) 1965	Part of Portugal								Part of Portugal					
(Philippines) 1966	Part of Portugal								Part of Portugal					
(Thailand) 1967	Part of Portugal								Part of Portugal					
(South Korea) 1968	Part of Portugal								Part of Portugal					
(Thailand) 1969	Part of Portugal								Part of Portugal					
(Philippines) 1970	Part of Portugal								Part of Portugal					
(Japan) 1971	Part of Portugal								Part of Portugal					
(Thailand) 1972	Part of Portugal								Part of Portugal					
(Iran) 1973	Part of Portugal								Part of Portugal					
(Thailand) 1974	Part of Portugal								Part of Portugal					
(Kuwait) 1975	Part of Portugal								Part of Portugal					
(Thailand) 1976	Part of Indonesia								Part of Indonesia					
(Iran) 1977	Part of Indonesia								Part of Indonesia					
(Bangladesh) 1978	Part of Indonesia								Part of Indonesia					
(Thailand) 1980	Part of Indonesia								Part of Indonesia					
(Thailand) 1982	Part of Indonesia								Part of Indonesia					
(United Arab Emirates) 1985	Part of Indonesia								Part of Indonesia					
(Saudi Arabia) 1986	Part of Indonesia								Part of Indonesia					
(Qatar) 1988	Part of Indonesia								Part of Indonesia					
(Indonesia) 1990	Part of Indonesia								Part of Indonesia					
(United Arab Emirates) 1992	Part of Indonesia								Part of Indonesia					
(Indonesia) 1994	Part of Indonesia								Part of Indonesia					
(South Korea) 1996	Part of Indonesia								Part of Indonesia					
(Thailand) 1998	Part of Indonesia								Part of Indonesia					
(Iran) 2000	did not exist, under United Nations								did not exist, under United Nations					
(Qatar) 2002	did not exist, under United Nations								did not exist, under United Nations					
(Malaysia) 2004	did not enter								did not enter					
(India) 2006	Withdrew								Withdrew					
(Saudi Arabia) 2008	Disqualified								Disqualified					
(China) 2010	did not enter								did not enter					
(United Arab Emirates) 2012	did not enter								did not enter					
(Myanmar) 2014	did not enter								did not enter					
(Bahrain) 2016	did not qualify								4	1	2	1	5	2
(Indonesia) 2018	did not qualify								4	0	1	3	3	14
(Uzbekistan) 2020	Cancelled								3	0	0	3	2	9
(Uzbekistan) 2023	did not qualify								3	1	0	2	2	9
Total	–	0/41	–	–	–	–	–	–	14	2	3	9	12	34

=== AFF U-19 Youth Championship record ===
AFF U-19 Youth Championship
Year	Round	Position	GP	W	D	L	GF	GA
(Cambodia) (Thailand) 2002	did not exist, under United Nations							
(Myanmar) (Vietnam) 2003	did not enter							
(Indonesia) 2005	Group stage	9th	4	0	1	3	5	15
(Malaysia) 2006	did not enter							
(Vietnam) 2007	did not enter							
(Thailand) 2008	did not enter							
(Vietnam) 2009	Group stage	8th	3	0	0	3	2	13
(Vietnam) 2010	did not enter							
(Myanmar) 2011	did not enter							
(Vietnam) 2012	did not enter							
(Indonesia) 2013	Third place	3rd	6	4	1	1	13	8
(Vietnam) 2014	did not enter							
(Laos) 2015	Group stage	9th	4	0	2	2	3	6
(Vietnam) 2016	Fourth place	4th	6	3	0	3	9	13
(Myanmar) 2017	Group stage	6th	5	2	1	2	7	10
(Indonesia) 2018	Group stage	8th	4	1	2	1	5	5
(Vietnam) 2019	Group stage	7th	5	2	0	3	12	13
(Indonesia) 2022	Group stage	6th	4	2	0	2	8	7
Total	Third place	9/18	41	14	7	20	65	86

== Coaching staff ==
Position	Staff
Head coach	(Malaysia) Gopalkrishnan Ramasamy
Assistant coach	(Timor-Leste) Weverton Mosca
Goalkeeper coach	(Timor-Leste) Lucas Régis
Physiotherapist	(Timor-Leste) Christopher Vieira
Media officer	(Timor-Leste) João Baptista Júnior
Administrator	(Timor-Leste) Fábio Gadelha
Official	(Timor-Leste) Domingos Calazans
Kitman	(Timor-Leste) Romualdo Sales

== Squad ==
Head coach: Eduardo Pereira

No.	Pos.	Player	Date of birth (age)	Club
1	GK	Domingos Baptista		(East Timor Football Federation)
2	DF	Rui Juman		(East Timor Football Federation)
3	DF	Carol Waitilia		(East Timor Football Federation)
4	DF	Aureo Viera		(East Timor Football Federation)
5	MF	Palomito Antonio		(East Timor Football Federation) Nagarjo
6	DF	Fabrizio dos Santos		(East Timor Football Federation)
7	FW	Luís Figo Pereira	17 April 2005 (aged 19)	(East Timor Football Federation) Ponta Leste
8	MF	Luis da Silva	20 May 2006 (aged 18)	(East Timor Football Federation) SLB Laulara
9	FW	Alexandre Vong Guterres		(East Timor Football Federation) Santa Cruz
10	FW	Alexandro Bakhito	1 May 2006 (aged 18)	(East Timor Football Federation) SLB Laulara
11	MF	Vabio Canavaro	25 January 2007 (aged 17)	(East Timor Football Federation) Ponta Leste
12	GK	Alexandre Quintão		(East Timor Football Federation) Marca
13	DF	Norbert Jonerson		(East Timor Football Federation)
14	MF	Edencio Soares	5 October 2005 (aged 18)	(East Timor Football Federation) Porto Taibesse
15	DF	Ricardo Bianco (captain)	15 January 2006 (aged 18)	(East Timor Football Federation) Ponta Leste
16	MF	Leonio Quilton		(East Timor Football Federation)
17	FW	Ario Melio		(East Timor Football Federation)
18	DF	Emidio Martins		(East Timor Football Federation)
19	DF	Francisco Assisi		(East Timor Football Federation)
20	GK	Egidio Luro		(East Timor Football Federation)
21	MF	Uaitila Aprilio		(East Timor Football Federation)
22	MF	Marques de Carvalho	25 February 2007 (aged 17)	(East Timor Football Federation) SLB Laulara
23	DF	Claudia Faria		(East Timor Football Federation)

== Stadium ==
- East Timor National Stadium (2002-present)
