= List of football clubs in Timor-Leste =

This is the list of football clubs in Timor-Leste.

== Currently Active Clubs ==
=== Liga Futebol Timor-Leste ===
Clubs that participated in the 2025 Liga Futebol Timor-Leste included:

Club Name	Competition
Académica	Primeira Divisão
Assalam	Primeira Divisão
AS Ponta Leste	Primeira Divisão
AS Marca FC	Primeira Divisão
Coração FC	Primeira Divisão
DIT FC	Primeira Divisão
Emmanuel FC	Primeira Divisão
Porto Taibesse	Primeira Divisão
Sport Laulara e Benfica	Primeira Divisão
Karketu Dili	Primeira Divisão
Aitana FC	Segunda Divisão
Fitun Estudante	Segunda Divisão
FC Kablaky	Segunda Divisão
Lica-Lica Lemorai	Segunda Divisão
FC Nagarjo	Segunda Divisão
Santa Cruz FC	Segunda Divisão
FC Zebra	Segunda Divisão

=== Terceira Divisão ===
Teams that participated in the 2025–26 Liga Futebol Timor-Leste Segunda Divisão Qualifiers included:

Club Name	Competition
FC Vila Ataúro	Terceira Divisão
Naimeco FC	Terceira Divisão
Re-Lay Laleia FC	Terceira Divisão
São José FC	Terceira Divisão
FC Beltatrez	Terceira Divisão
Covalima FC	Terceira Divisão
ADR União	Terceira Divisão
B2B FC	Terceira Divisão
Fimas Baucau	Terceira Divisão
Fatunsah FC	Terceira Divisão
Unidos FC	Terceira Divisão
AC Mamura	Terceira Divisão
AS Kantada	Terceira Divisão
Assa FC	Terceira Divisão
FC Nature	Terceira Divisão
FC Warikoan	Terceira Divisão
FC Lero	Terceira Divisão
FC Rai Metin	Terceira Divisão
FC Leopa	Terceira Divisão
Tatamailau	Terceira Divisão
AD Santo António	Terceira Divisão
Dark Blue FC	Terceira Divisão
Maudoko FC	Terceira Divisão
Rai Klaran FC	Terceira Divisão
YMCA Comoro	Terceira Divisão
Saralima FC	Terceira Divisão
Ostico FC	Terceira Divisão
Academia Hera FC	Terceira Divisão
Karau Fuik FC	Terceira Divisão
AD Baucau All Star (BAS)	Terceira Divisão
Weasel FC	Terceira Divisão
Laisorulai CF Matebian	Terceira Divisão
KEF Ablai	Terceira Divisão
Sousa United	Terceira Divisão
FC Aimo	Terceira Divisão
Hibers Díli FC	Terceira Divisão
Mota Bandeira FC	Terceira Divisão
Irapuha FC	Terceira Divisão
Atlético De Mota'ain	Terceira Divisão

== Former Liga Futebol Amadora Clubs ==
Clubs that have participated in the Liga Futebol Amadora sometime between 2015 and 2018, however are not currently a part of the competition:

- Sport Dili e Benfica
- FC Café
- FC Irmãos Unidos
- União Tokodede
- LA Matebian
- FC Leopa
- Liquica FC
- Lalenok United
- Boavista Timor
- AS Inur Transforma
- AD Maubisse
- AS Lero
- Kuda Ulun FC

== Liga Feto Timor 2020 Clubs ==
The following clubs participated in the Liga Feto Timor female football competition in 2020.

- Académica
- Ass. Baucau FC
- Sport Laulara e Benfica
- Buibere FC
- Marathana FC
- Maudoko FC
- Nain-Feto FC
- S'Amuser FC
- São José FC
- Unital FC
- VDL FC

== Taça Digicel ==
In 2011 the member clubs of the Taça Digicel were:

- AD Aileu
- AD Ainaro
- AD Baucau
- AD Bobonaro
- AD Cova Lima
- AD Dili Leste
- AD Dili Oeste
- AD Ermera
- AD Lautem
- AD Liquica
- AD Manatuto
- AD Manufahi
- AD Oecusse
- AD Viqueque

== Super Liga ==
Locations of the 2016 Liga Futebol Amadora teams.
Super Liga
Pre Liga

Clubs that played in the Super Liga in 2006 included:

- Académica
- F.C. Café
- Fima Sporting
- SLB Laulara
- FC Porto Taibesi
- F.C. Rusa Fuik
- AD Vos Esperança
- F.C. Zebra

Clubs that played in the Pra Liga in 2005–06 included:.

- FC Audin
- Bulgária SC
- Cacusan CF
- F.C. Irmãos Unidos
- Kulugisa
- AS Lero
- São Jose
- ADR União
- Virtu
