= 2020 Liga Futebol Amadora Terceira Divisão =

2020 LFA Terceira
Tournament details
- Country: Timor Leste

Final positions
- Champions: No champion

The 2020 edition of the Liga Futebol Amadora Terceira Divisão was canceled by the FFTL due to the COVID-19 pandemic. The FFTL decided to hold only two official competitions for the 2020 season, The 2020 Copa FFTL and Taça 12 de Novembro.

== Clubs (expected) ==
- AC Mamura
- AD Maubisse
- ADR União
- AS Lero (Lautem)
- AS Inur Transforma
- Cacusan CF
- FC Lero (Iliomar)
- Karau Fuik FC (Viqueque)
- Kuda Ulun FC
- Laleia United FC
- YMCA FC
