= 2025–26 Liga Futebol Timor-Leste Segunda Divisão Qualifiers =

Segunda Divisão Qualifiers 2025-26
- Season: 2026
- Dates: 8 December 2025 - Current
- Teams: 39

The 2025-26 Segunda Divisão Qualifiers, also known as the Terceira Divisão, is a men's association football competition in Timor-Leste. The competition forms part of the Liga Futebol Timor-Leste league system, with the competition containing promotion to the national 2nd division, the Segunda Divisão.

== Competition Format ==
The competition is competed in by 39 different teams from around the different districts of Timor-Leste. This includes both local amateur teams, alongside teams that have previously featured in the Liga Futebol Timor-Leste in previous years.

The competition consists of a group stage format, with teams split into 8 groups of 5. Within these groups, the top 2 teams from each qualify for a single round knockout stage. This knockout stage will determine teams promoted into the Segunda Divisao, with a total of 5 teams being promoted. The teams that were promoted were:

- FC Vila Atauro
- FC Weasel
- AC Mamura
- Hibers Dili
- AD Santo Antonio

== Group Stage ==
Results as of the 1st of February 2026

=== Group A ===
Pos	Club	GP	W	D	L	GF	GA	GD	Pts
1	FC Vila Ataúro (Q)	4	3	1	0	12	2	10	10
2	Naimeco FC (Q)	4	3	1	0	6	3	3	10
3	Re-Lay Laleia FC	3	1	0	2	4	6	-2	3
4	São José FC	4	1	0	3	3	8	-5	3
5	FC Beltatrez	3	0	0	3	4	10	-6	0

The final match between Re-Lay Laleia FC and FC Beltatrez was not played.

=== Group B ===
Pos.	Clube	P	J	V	E	D	GP	GC	SG
1	Covalima FC (Q)	4	3	0	1	18	7	11	9
2	ADR União (Q)	4	3	0	1	13	5	8	9
3	B2B FC	4	2	1	1	7	8	-1	7
4	Fimas Baucau	4	1	0	3	2	11	-9	3
5	Fatunsah FC	4	0	1	3	4	13	-9	1

=== Group C ===
Pos.	Clube	P	J	V	E	D	GP	GC	SG
1	Unidos FC (Q)	4	4	0	0	10	2	8	12
2	AC Mamura (Q)	4	3	0	1	9	4	5	9
3	AS Kantada	4	2	0	2	8	7	1	6
4	Assa FC	4	1	0	3	7	11	-4	3
5	FC Nature	4	0	0	4	2	12	-10	0

=== Group D ===
Pos.	Clube	P	J	V	E	D	GP	GC	SG
1	FC Warikoan (Q)	4	2	2	0	13	2	11	8
2	FC Lero (Q)	4	2	1	1	9	6	3	7
3	FC Rai Metin	4	2	1	1	5	3	2	7
4	FC Leopa	4	0	2	2	4	11	-7	2
5	Tatamailau	4	0	2	2	3	12	-9	2

=== Group E ===
Pos.	Clube	P	J	V	E	D	GP	GC	SG
1	AD Santo António (Q)	4	4	0	0	13	1	12	12
2	Dark Blue FC (Q)	4	2	1	1	9	5	4	7
3	Maudoko FC	4	1	2	1	7	6	1	5
4	Rai Klaran FC	4	1	0	3	5	13	-8	3
5	YMCA Comoro	4	0	1	3	4	13	-9	1

=== Group F ===
Pos.	Clube	P	J	V	E	D	GP	GC	SG
1	Saralima FC (Q)	4	3	1	0	21	4	17	10
2	Ostico FC (Q)	4	2	2	0	8	2	6	8
3	Academia Hera FC	4	2	1	1	7	3	4	7
4	Karau Fuik FC	4	1	0	3	4	16	-12	3
5	AD Baucau All Star (BAS)*	4	0	0	4	4	19	-15	0

*AD BAS failed to participate in their final match against Academia Hera FC. This resulted in a 3-0 forfeit, and disqualified AD BAS from participating in LFTL competitions for the next 2 consecutive seasons.

=== Group G ===
Pos.	Clube	P	J	V	E	D	GP	GC	SG
1	Weasel FC (Q)	4	3	1	0	12	3	9	10
2	Laisorulai CF Matebian (Q)	4	3	1	0	10	6	4	10
3	KEF Ablai	4	1	1	2	4	5	-1	4
4	Sousa United	4	1	1	2	3	6	-3	4
5	FC Aimo	4	0	0	4	2	11	-9	0

=== Group H ===
Pos.	Clube	P	J	V	E	D	GP	GC	SG
1	Hibers Díli FC (Q)	3	2	1	0	11	4	7	7
2	Mota Bandeira FC (Q)	3	2	0	1	9	4	5	6
3	Irapuha FC	3	1	1	1	2	3	-1	4
4	Atlético De Mota'ain	3	0	0	3	2	13	-11	0

== Knockout Stage ==
A total of 16 teams qualified from the group stage for the knockout stages. From these 16 teams a total of 5 teams are to be promoted to the Segunda Division. This includes the 4 winners of the promotion matches, and the winner of the losers bracket final.

First Round
FC Vila Ataúro	5
ADR União	0
Unidos FC	2
FC Lero	4
AD Santo Antonio	1
FC Ostico	0
Weasel FC	1
Mota Bandeira FC	0
Naimeco FC	0
Covalima FC	3
AC Mamura	0 (5)
Warikoan FC	0 (4)
Dark Blue FC	1 (6)
Saralima FC	1 (7)
Laisorulai CF	0
Hibers Dili	2

Promotion Match
FC Vila Ataúro	2 (5)
FC Lero	2 (4)
AD Santo Antonio	1
Weasel FC	2
Covalima FC	0
AC Mamura	1
Saralima FC	0
Hibers Dili	1

Losers Semi-Final
FC Lero	1
AD Santo Antonio	3
Covalima FC	0 (8)
Saralima FC	0 (7)

Losers Final
AD Santo Antonio	3
Covalima FC	1
