= 2019 Liga Futebol Amadora Terceira Divisão =

2019 LFA Terceira
Tournament details
- Country: Timor Leste
- Dates: 5 November – 9 December 2019
- Teams: 11

Final positions
- Champions: Emmanuel FC
- Runners-up: AS Marca FC

Tournament statistics
- Matches played: 24
- Goals scored: 84 (3.5 per match)

2019 Liga Futebol Amadora Terceira Divisão (often referred to as the LFA Terceira Divisão) was the inaugural season of the third-highest division of the Liga Futebol Amadora, and third-highest overall in the Timorense football league system.

== Clubs (2019) ==
The following 11 clubs competed in the 2019 Liga Futebol Amadora Terceira Divisão, as Emmanuel and Marca were promoted to Liga Futebol Amadora Segunda Divisão.

Emmanuel FC (Díli), AC Mamura (Díli), AS Inur Transforma (Díli), Karau Fuik FC (Viqueque), AD Maubisse (Maubisse), Laleia United FC (Manatuto), AS Marca FC (Díli), YMCA FC (Díli), AS Lero (Lautém), Kuda Ulun FC (Maliana) and ADR União (Díli).

== Final tables ==
=== Grupo A ===
1.Emmanuel FC                              5   5  0  0  15- 6  15       Promoted

2.AC Mamura                                5   4  0  1  12- 5  12
3.AS Inur Transforma                       5   3  0  2   9- 6   9
4.Karau Fuik FC (Viqueque)                 5   2  0  3  11- 9   6
5.AD Maubisse                              5   1  0  4   4-12   3
6.Laleia United FC                         5   0  0  5   2-15   0

=== Grupo B ===
1.AS Marca FC                              4   3  1  0  14- 3  10       Promoted

2.YMCA Comoro FC                           3   2  1  0   6- 1   7
3.AS Lero (Lautem)                         3   2  0  1   5- 4   6
4.Kuda Ulun FC                             4   0  1  3   4- 8   1
5.Asociação Desportiva e Recreativa União  4   0  1  3   2-15   1

NB: remaining match apparently declared void
