= Audin =

Audin is a French surname. Notable people with the surname include:

- Amable Audin (1899–1990), French archaeologist
- Jean-M.-Vincent Audin (1793–1851), French Roman Catholic author, journalist and historian
- Martine Audin (born 1959), French gymnast
- Maurice Audin (1932–1957), French mathematician
- Michèle Audin (1954–2025), French mathematician, writer and professor
- Nadine Audin (born 1958), French gymnast

== See also ==
- FC Audin, a football club of East Timor
