= Lospalos Administrative Post =

Administrative post in Lautém Municipality, Timor-Leste

Lospalos
- Administrative Post
- Posto Administrativo de Lospalos (Portuguese); Postu administrativu Lospalos (Tetum)
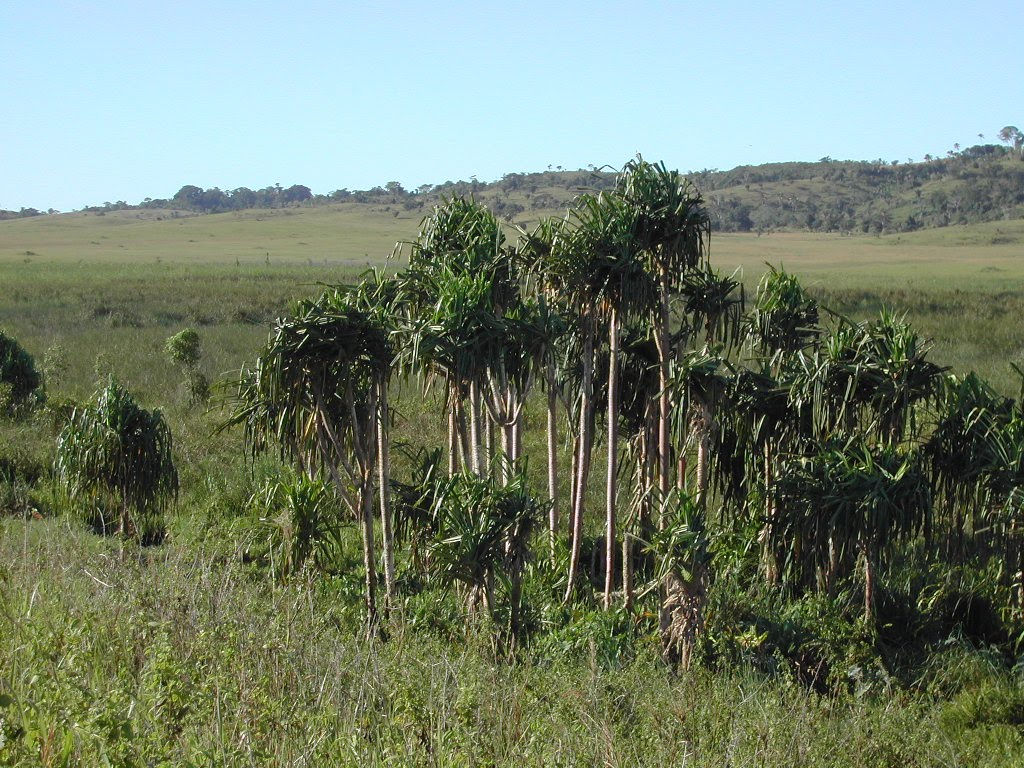
- Freshwater spring-fed wetland near Lospalos

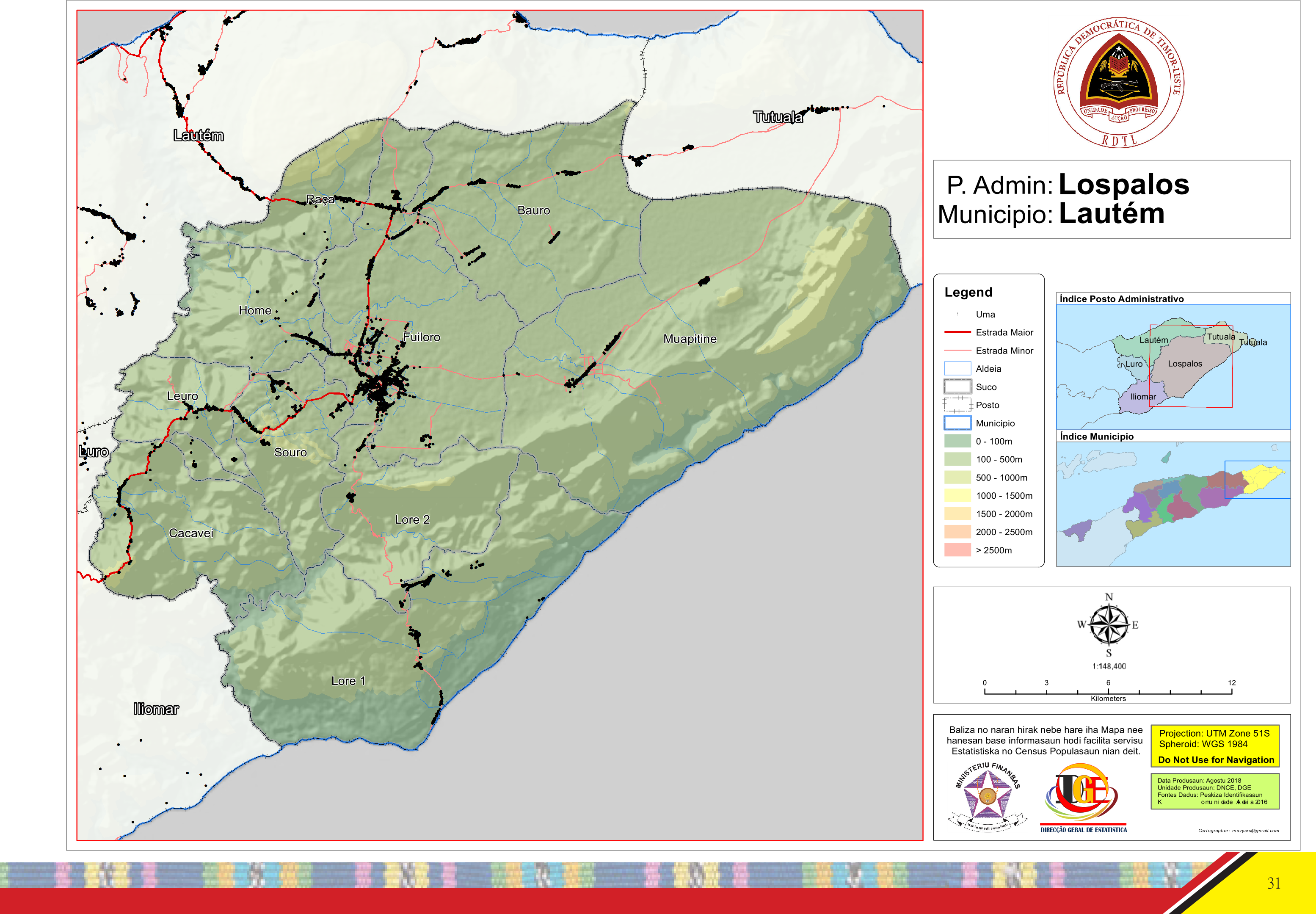
- Official map

- Location within East Timor
- Coordinates: 8°31′S 127°2′E
- Country: Timor-Leste
- Municipality: Lautém
- Seat: Lospalos
- Sucos: Bauro; Cacavei; Fuiloro; Home; Leuro; Muapitine; Raça; Souro

Population (2015 census)
  - Total: 31,164
- Time zone: UTC+09:00 (TLT)

Lospalos, officially Lospalos Administrative Post (Portuguese: Posto Administrativo de Lospalos, Tetum: Postu administrativu Lospalos), is an administrative post (and was formerly a subdistrict) in Lautém municipality, Timor-Leste. Its seat or administrative centre is Fuiloro.
