= Tiberio Tinelli =

Italian painter

Cavalier Tiberio Tinelli
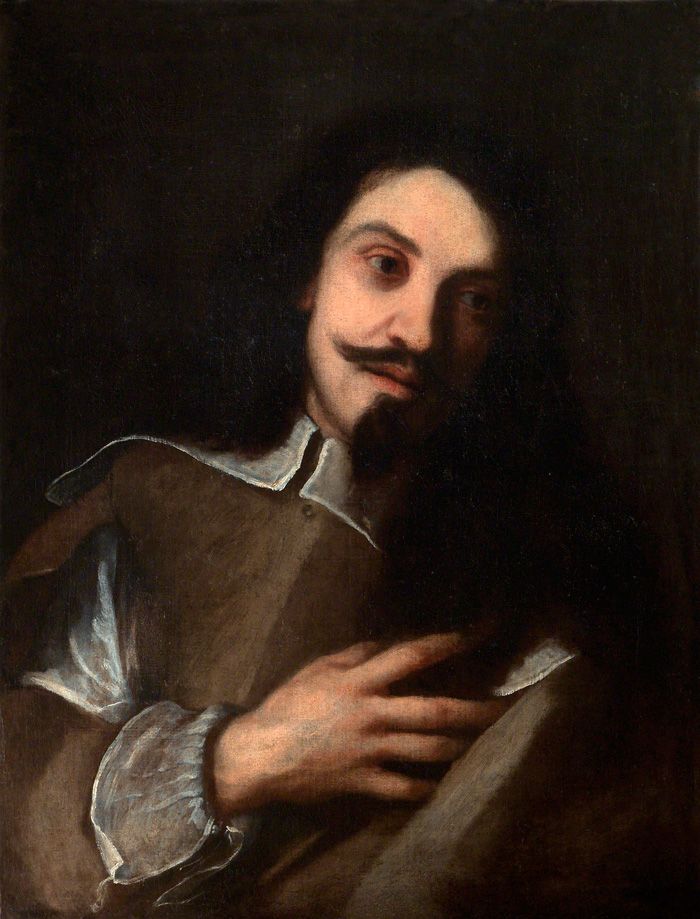
- Tiberio Tinelli, Portrait of painter Karel Škréta (1635), National Gallery Prague
- Born: 1587; Venice, Republic of Venice
- Died: 22 May 1639 (aged 51–52); Venice, Republic of Venice
- Education: Giovanni Contarini; Leandro Bassano
- Known for: Painting
- Movement: Baroque

Tiberio Tinelli (1587 – 22 May 1639) was an Italian painter of the early-Baroque period, active mainly in his native city of Venice. He was one of the most important Italian portrait painters of the first quarter of the 17th century and greatly admired by contemporary critics. Ridolfi describes his vast output, yet only a few works have been identified, and the scarcity of documents makes a reassessment of his work difficult.

== Biography ==
Tiberio Tinelli was born in Venice in 1587. He was a pupil of Giovanni Contarini, a pupil of the late Titian, and Leandro Bassano and they, and late Mannerist painters, were the earliest influences on his art. Later he moved towards the freer and more introspective portrait style of Anthony van Dyck, Simon Vouet and Nicolas Régnier, all of whom were active in Italy between 1622 and 1625. His fame was based on his portraits. He was well known for his portraits of aristocracy, merchants, and intellectuals in Venice, whom he often painted in historical dress. Documentary records show that he also painted numerous religious and secular works but the only surviving example of these is St. Alvise, Bishop of Toulouse (c. 1616; Venice, Gallerie dell'Accademia), painted as an organ shutter for Santa Maria della Celestia, Venice.

His portrait of Paolo Sarpi (untraced; known through an engraving by Giovanni Cattini, e.g. London, Courtauld Gallery) also dates from 1610–20. The portrait of Niccolò da Mula (Milan, Pinacoteca di Brera, on dep. Museo Poldi Pezzoli), still close to Bassano, may date from the 1620s (Pallucchini, 1981). The portrait of Jacopo Pighetti (untraced) dates from 1629, a date deduced from Marco Boschini’s engraving in which the subject’s age is given as 28.

There are several portraits from the 1630s, including: Karel Škréta (National Gallery Prague, Kinský Palace), depicting Tinelli’s pupil and datable to between 1630 and 1634 when Škréta was in Venice; the famous full-length portrait of Emilia Papafava Borromeo (Padua, Musei Civici), in which the sitter is exceptionally richly attired and the details of dress and jewellery are highly finished; that of Marcantonio Viario (1637; Hartford, Wadsworth Atheneum); and the full-length Ludovico Widmann (Washington, D.C., National Gallery of Art), in which the influence of van Dyck is apparent in the nonchalant elegance of the figure, who leans against ruined architecture and fragments of Classical sculpture. This last is datable to 1638 on the basis of an anonymous engraving (Venice, Bib. Correr, Col. Gherro, vol. III, no. 406), which also gives the age of the subject.

Tinelli's small pictures of historical and mythological subjects were also popular. Some of his pictures found their way into the collection of Louis XIII, king of France, who knighted him with the Order of Saint Michael. Domestic afflictions drove him into a state of despondency, causing him to commit suicide.

== Selected works ==
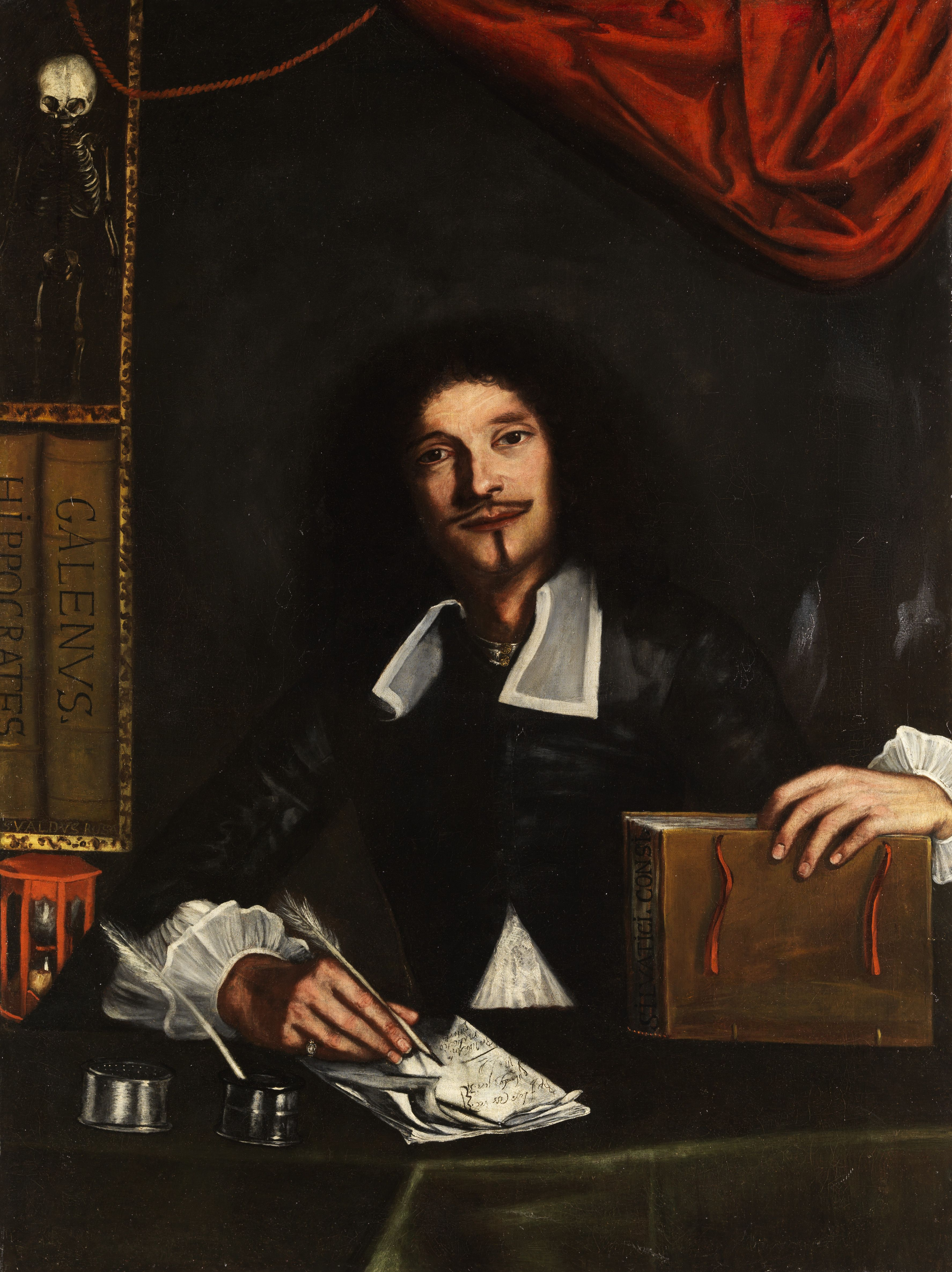
Portrait of a young Doctor, c. 1636, priv. col.

- Portrait of Francesco Querini (c. 1615), Hood Museum of Art, Dartmouth College, New Hampshire;
- St. Alvise, Bishop of Toulouse, c. 1616, Gallerie dell'Accademia, Venice;
- Portrait of Niccolò da Mula (1620s), Pinacoteca di Brera, Milan;
- Portrait of Giulio Strozzi (c. 1630), Uffizi, Florence;
- Portrait of an Avogadore (1631), Doge's Palace, Venice;
- Portrait of painter Karel Škréta (1635), National Gallery Prague;
- Portrait of a young Doctor, c. 1636, priv. col.;
- Portraint of Marcantonio Viario (1637), Wadsworth Atheneum, Hartford;
- Portrait of Luigi Molin (1637–1638), Gallerie dell'Accademia, Venice;
- Portrait of Ludovico Widmann (1637), National Gallery of Art, Washington, D.C.;
- Portrait of Lucas van Uffelen, (c. 1638), Metropolitan Museum of Art, New York;
- Portrait di Emilia Papafava Borromeo, Museo d'Arte Medioevale e Moderna, Padua;
- Portrait of a Man, Uffizi, Vasari Corridor, Florence.
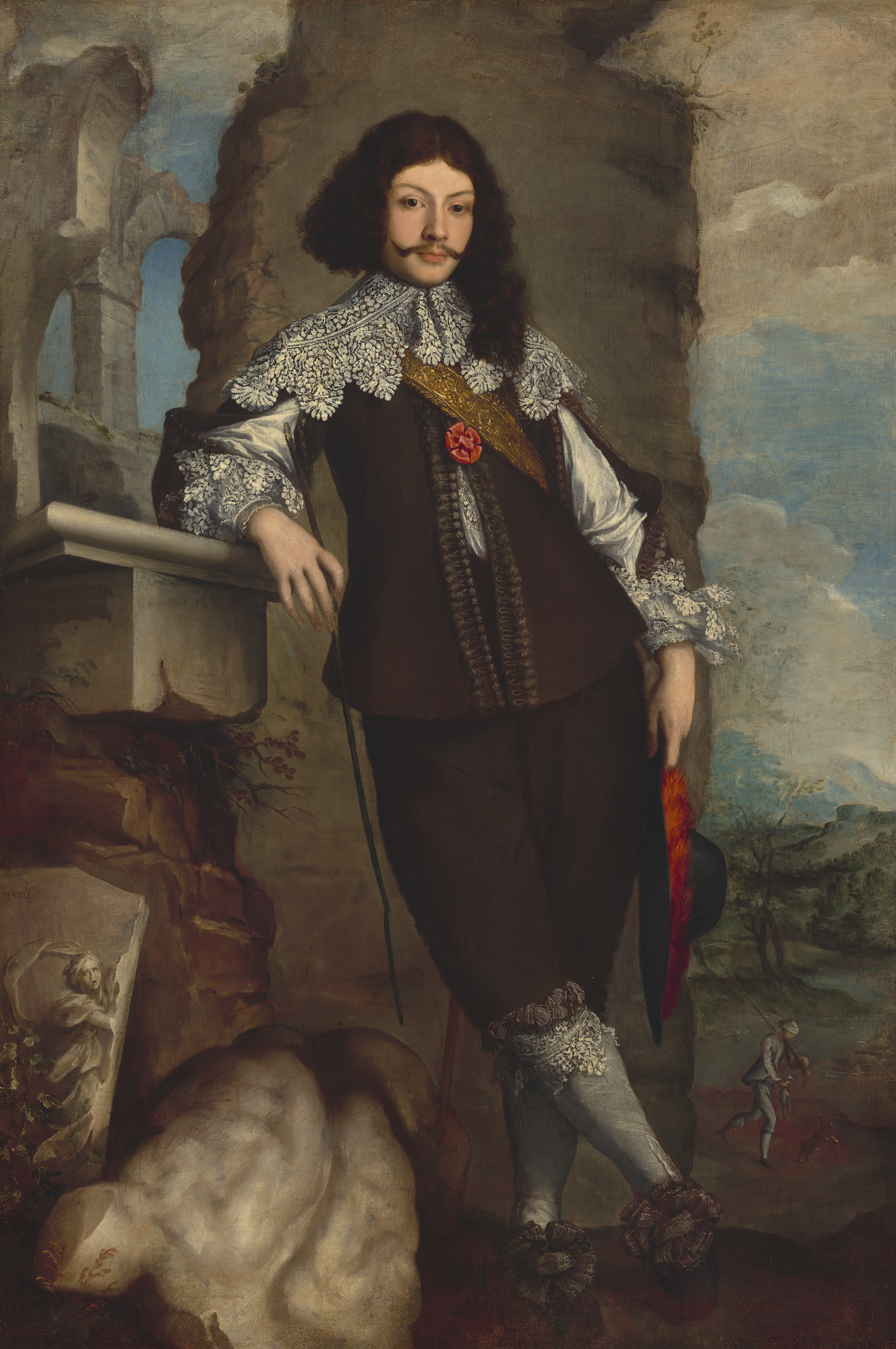
Portrait of Ludovico Widmann (1637), National Gallery of Art, Washington, D.C.

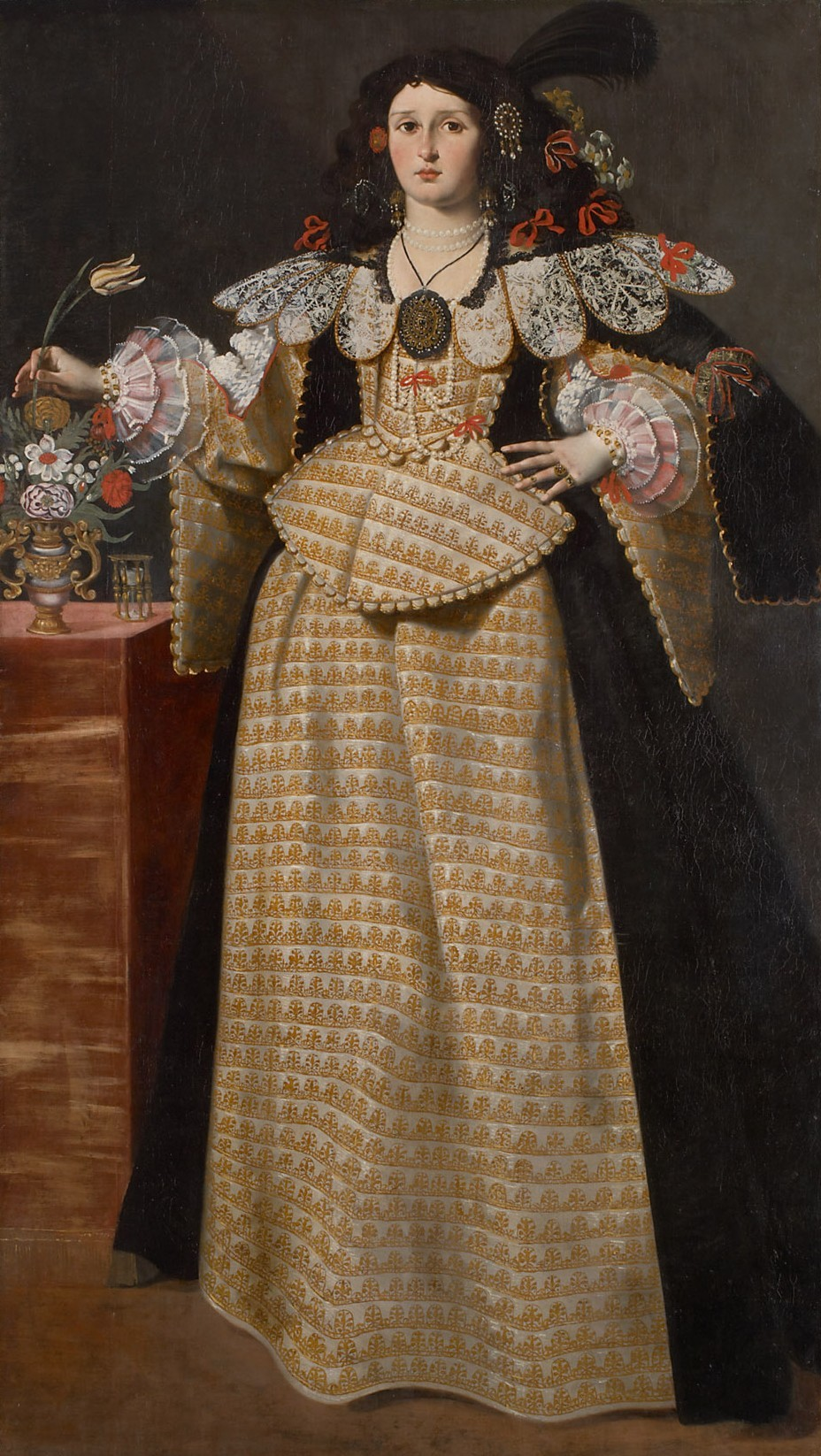
Portrait of a Lady, Kunsthistorisches Museum, Vienna

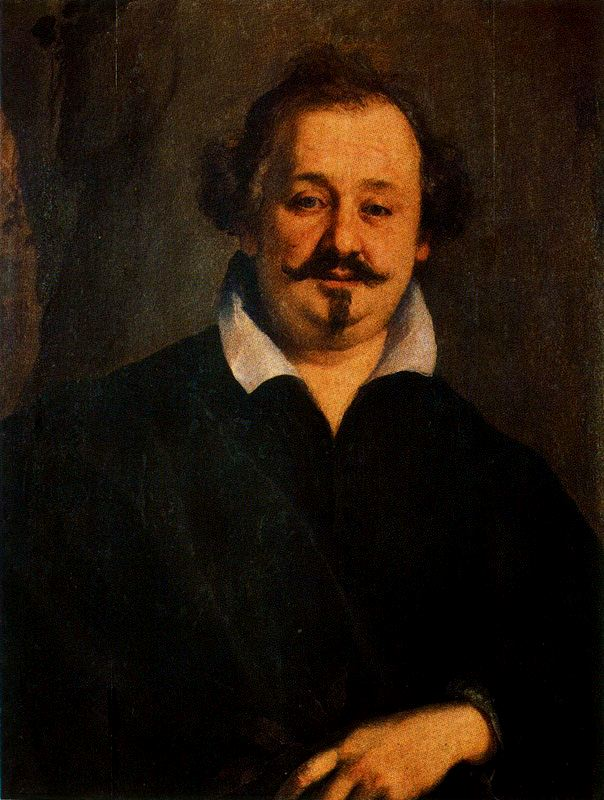
Portrait of Giulio Strozzi (c. 1630), Uffizi, Florence

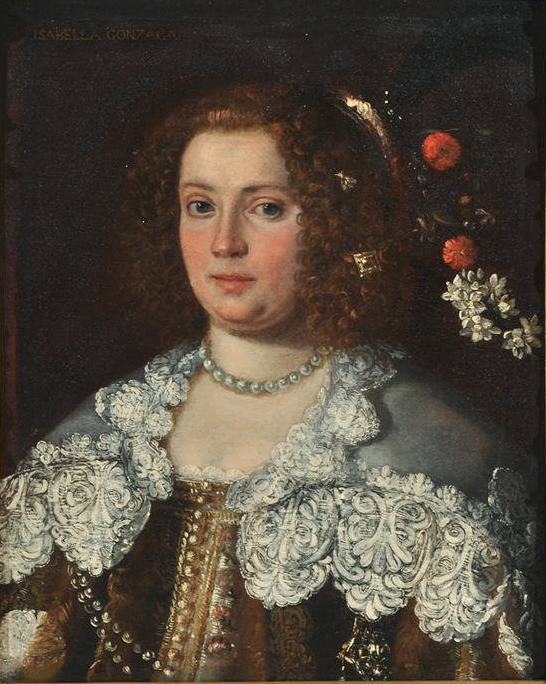
Portrait of Isabella Gonzaga, priv. col.

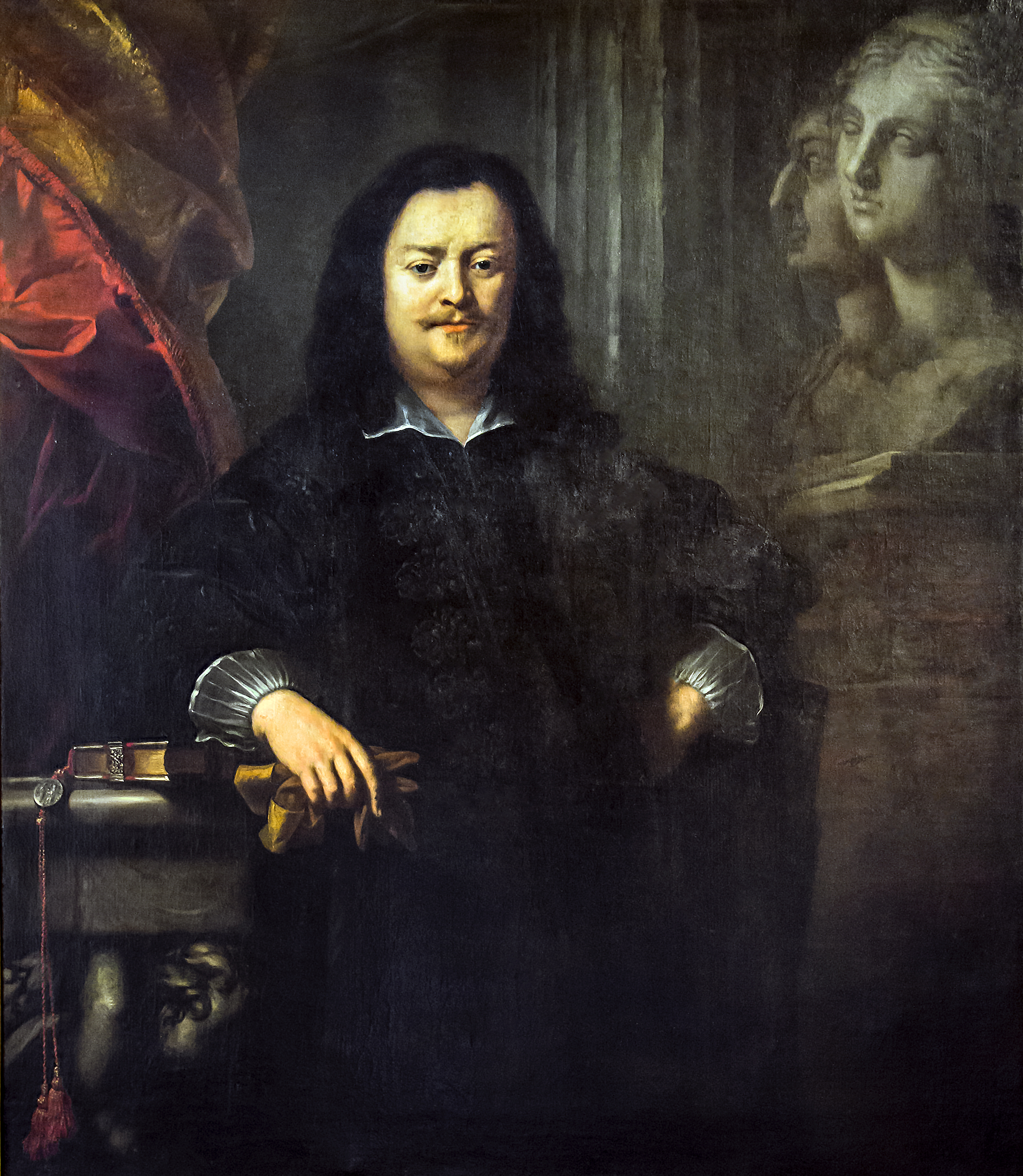
Portrait of Luigi Molin (1637-1638), Gallerie dell'Accademia, Venice

Minerva, Mars and Venus (after Jacopo Tintoretto), National Gallery of Denmark, Copenhagen
