= Eric (footballer, born 1977) =

East Timorese footballer

Personal information
- Full name: Helder Mota Ricardo
- Date of birth: 1 August 1977 (age 49)
- Place of birth: Dili, Timor Timur, Indonesia (now East Timor)
- Height: 1.65 m (5 ft 5 in)
- Position: Midfielder

Team information
- Current team: Ad. Dili Leste

Senior career*
Years	Team	Apps	(Gls)
2010	Dili Leste		

International career^{‡}
2003–2011	Timor-Leste	14	(0)
- * Club domestic league appearances and goals ‡ National team caps and goals as of 2 July 2011

Helder Mota Ricardo, also known as Eric (born 1 August 1977) is an East Timorese former footballer who plays as midfielder for Ad. Dili Leste and the Timor-Leste national football team.
