= 1735 in architecture =

The year 1735 in architecture involved some significant events.

== Buildings and structures ==
=== Buildings ===
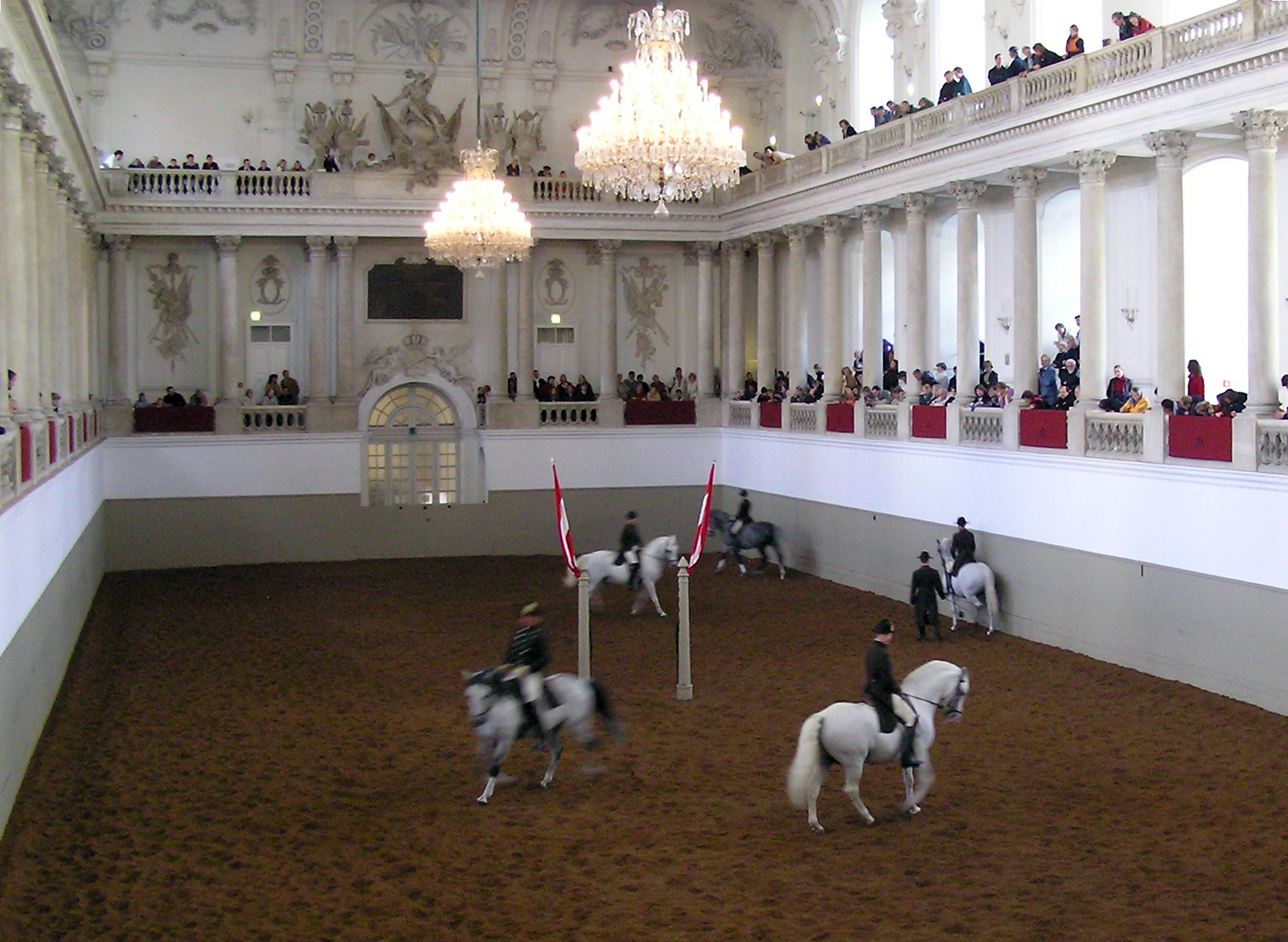
Spanish Riding School, Vienna

- The North Quad of All Souls College at the University of Oxford, designed by Nicholas Hawksmoor, is completed.
- The South Range (Front Screen) of The Queen's College, Oxford, is completed.
- Reconstruction of Cathedral of San Carlos De Borromeo (Matanzas) in Cuba is completed.
- Major reconstruction of Udine Cathedral in the Republic of Venice by Domenico Rossi is completed.
- Church of San Francesco di Paola, Milan, designed by Marco Antonio Bianchi, is consecrated.
- Chandos Mausoleum in Canons Park near London, designed by James Gibbs, is built.
- Spanish Riding School in Vienna, designed by Joseph Emanuel Fischer von Erlach, is completed.
- Rokeby Hall in the north of England, designed by Thomas Robinson, is completed.
- 8-9 Henrietta Street, Dublin, are built.

== Births ==
- October 27 – William Newton, English architect (died 1790)

== Deaths ==
- Antonio Beduzzi, Italian architect and interior designer working in Vienna (born 1675)
