= AD Maliana =

- Full name: Associação Desportiva Maliana
- Founded: 2010; 16 years ago
- League: Taça Digicel

AD Maliana or Associação Desportiva Maliana is a football club of East Timor come from Maliana, Bobonaro District. The team plays in the Taça Digicel.
