= Di Paola =

Di Paola or DiPaola is an Italian surname, and may refer to:

- Giampaolo Di Paola, Italian naval officer
- Manuel Di Paola, Italian footballer
- Andrea Di Paola, Italian astronomer
- Vicente Di Paola, Argentinian footballer
- James DiPaola, American sheriff
- Francesco di Paola Cassetta, Italian cardinal
- Josip Franjo di Paola Nowak, Italian archbishop
- Francesco di Paola Villadecani, Italian cardinal

== See also ==
- San Francesco di Paola, Naples, church
- San Francesco di Paola, Milan, church
- San Francesco di Paola, Florence, church
- San Francesco di Paola, Venice, church
- San Francesco di Paola ai Monti, church
