= Albina Marçal Freitas =

East Timorese politician (1958–2019)

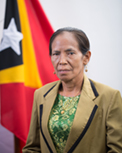
- Born: February 12, 1958
- Died: December 29, 2019 (aged 61)
- Occupations: teacher, freedom fighter and politician
- Political party: National Congress for Timorese Reconstruction

Albina Marçal Freitas or Albina Marcal Freitas (February 12, 1958 – December 29, 2019) was an East Timorese politician. She was a freedom fighter who spent four years under arrest and was then mistrusted by her colleagues. She was restored in 1996 and rose to be a member of parliament.

== Life ==
She was born in 1958. She received a good education and became a teacher. This was disrupted when Indonesia invaded East Timor in 1975 and Freitas joined the resistance group Falintil.

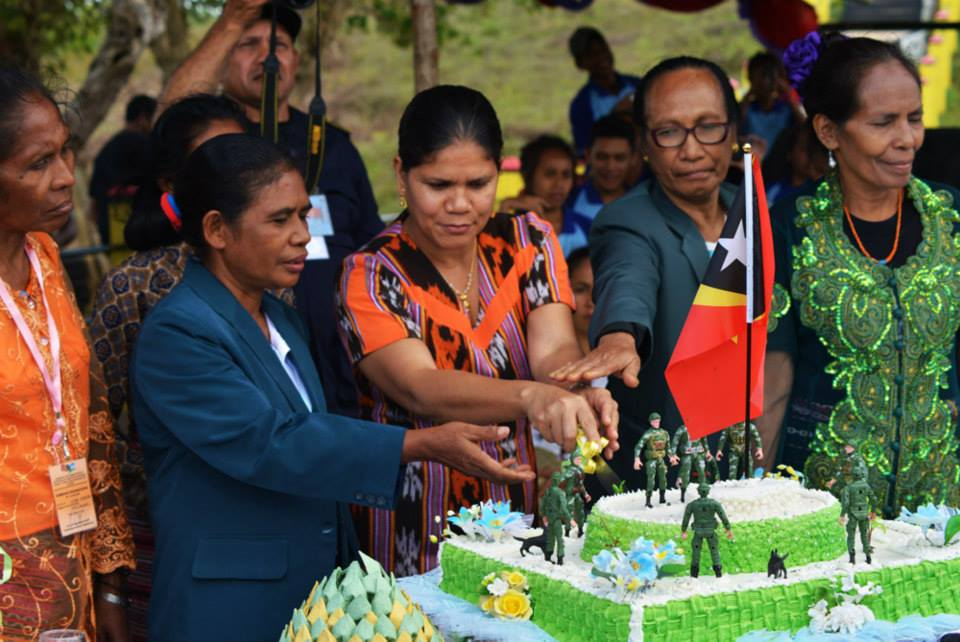
Freitas with Isabel da Costa Ferreira at the memorial to the Tchaivatcha Tragedy in 2015

She married Miguel Pereira (nom de guerre Falutxai), in 1982 during the war with Indonesia. Their best man Xanana Gusmão was to be the first president of East Timor. Her husband died in the "Tchaivatcha Tragedy" in 1985 and Freitas returned to Lospalos and was arrested. She lost two other siblings in the war and she served four years in jail . Even when released she found that she was not trusted by her former colleagues. She was not restored to her former status until 1996. She was again accepted and she took leading roles in the Organisation of East Timor Women.

In 2000 she co-wrote a paper on the role of women in maintaining peace and security.

She was involved in creating the memorial to the Tchaivatcha Tragedy and she attended its opening on 20 July 2015.

She was a member of the National Congress for Timorese Reconstruction party and in 2012 she became a member of parliament.

Freitas died at the end of 2019 and her funeral was on 2 January 2020.

== Award ==
Freitas was awarded the Ordens Nicolau Lobato in 2006.
