= AD Lautem =

East Timorese football club

- Full name: Associação Desportiva Lautem
- Founded: 2010
- Ground: Independensia, Lospalos
- Capacity: 100
- League: Taça Digicel
Home colours	Away colours

AD Lautem or Associação Desportiva Lautem is a football club of East Timor from Lautém District. The team plays in the Taça Digicel.
