= 2024 Copa FFTL =

Association football competition in Timor-Leste

Copa FFTL
- Season: 2024
- Dates: 10 May –14 July
- Champions: São José FC
- Best player: Rufino Gama (São José FC)
- Top goalscorer: João Pedro (DIT FC)

The 2024 Copa FFTL, also known as the FFTL Cup, is a men's association football competition in Timor-Leste. The tournament was organised by the East Timor Football Federation, taking place instead of the Liga Futebol Timor-Leste league season.

Initially teams from the top two divisions of the Liga Futebol Timor-Leste were expected to compete, filling the void of no other national competitions taking place throughout the year and creating a platform for the East Timorese national team to prepare for their upcoming international fixtures in the AFC Asian Cup and ASEAN Championship qualifiers. After the competition had been announced however multiple teams were reported as disagreeing with the FFTL's organisation of the tournament, noting that there was a lack of any formal consultation between clubs and the football federation taking place before the competition was announced. This, alongside a lack of financial support to teams provided resulted in only a few teams from the top two divisions being registered for the competition, these being Lica-Lica Lemorai, DIT FC and FIEL FC. The rest of the tournament was made up of other new and existing teams from the nation competing in the competition.

The competition was a successor to the 2020 Copa FFTL. The final of the competition was won by São José FC, beating B2B FC 1-0 in a final held at the Estadiu Munisipal Díli. The winner of the competition received a prize of $15,000 USD, 2nd and 3rd place received $10,000 and $5,000.

== Group stage ==
The group stage for the competition commenced on the 10th of May 2024. Each group consisted of 4 teams, playing 3 games each. The top 2 teams from each group progressed to a knockout stage.

=== Group A ===
Pos	Team	Pld	W	D	L	GF	GA	GD	Pts	Qualification or relegation
1	Re-Lay Laleia FC	3	2	1	0	7	2	5	7	Qualified for Quarter Finals
2	DIT FC	3	1	2	0	12	2	10	5	Qualified for Quarter Finals
3	AS Kantada	3	1	1	1	3	6	-3	4	
4	Nature FC	3	0	0	3	0	18	-18	0	

=== Group B ===
Pos	Team	Pld	W	D	L	GF	GA	GD	Pts	Qualification or relegation
1	Assa FC	3	3	0	0	9	1	8	9	Qualified for Quarter Finals
2	Mushila FC	3	2	0	1	8	5	3	6	Qualified for Quarter Finals
3	ATL Mota-Ain	3	1	0	2	2	2	0	3	
4	Rai Klaran FC	3	0	0	3	1	12	-11	0	

=== Group C ===
Pos	Team	Pld	W	D	L	GF	GA	GD	Pts	Qualification or relegation
1	FC Zhavia Kuda Ulun FC	3	2	1	0	9	4	5	7	Qualified for Quarter Finals
2	FIEL FC	3	1	2	0	3	2	1	5	Qualified for Quarter Finals
3	FC Iraler	3	1	0	2	3	6	-3	3	
4	Mau Bale FC	3	0	1	2	4	7	-3	1	

=== Group D ===
Pos	Team	Pld	W	D	L	GF	GA	GD	Pts	Qualification or relegation
1	B2B FC	3	3	0	0	12	5	7	9	Qualified for Quarter Finals
2	São José FC	3	2	0	1	5	3	2	6	Qualified for Quarter Finals
3	Lica-Lica Lemorai	3	1	0	2	6	6	0	3	
4	FC Ostico	3	0	0	3	2	11	-9	0	

== Knockout stage ==
The knockout stage of the competition began on the 4th of July, with the final taking place on the 14 July. All matches were played at the Estadiu Munisipal Díli.

Quarter-finals
4 July – Díli
Relay Laleia FC	2
Mushila FC	1
6 July – Díli
Zhavia FC	1 (1)
São José FC (pen)	1 (4)
5 July – Díli
Assa FC	0
DIT FC	4
7 July – Díli
B2B FC	4
FIEL FC	1

Semi-finals
10 July – Díli
Relay Laleia FC	0
São José FC	2
11 July – Díli
DIT FC	1 (2)
B2B FC (pen)	1 (4)

Final
14 July – Díli
São José FC	1
B2B FC	0

=== 3rd place playoff ===
13 July 2024
16:00 UTC+9

Relay Laleia FC	2–2	DIT FC
Herboni Lopes 28'; Joanico Pinto 36'		João Pedro 8', 48'
Penalties
	3-0

Estádio Nacional de Timor-Leste

=== Final ===
14 July 2024
16:00 UTC+9

São José FC	1–0	B2B FC
Rufino Gama 70'	Report

Estadiu Munisipal Díli
