= 2016 Liga Futebol Amadora =

Liga Futebol Amadora
- Season: 2016
- Champions: Primera SL Benfica (1st) Segunda Cacusan CF (1st)
- Promoted: Segunda Cacusan CF, FC Zebra
- Relegated: Primera FC Aitana, DIT F.C. Segunda None
- AFC Cup: Sport Laulara e Benfica
- Matches: 94
- Goals: 293 (3.12 per match)
- Top goalscorer: Primera Patrich Wanggai (Karketu, 10 goals) Segunda ?
- All statistics correct as of 24 April 2016.

The 2016 Liga Futebol Amadora is the first season of the Liga Futebol Amadora. The season began on 25 February 2016. The Primeira Divisão began on February 25 and finished on July 24, while the Segunda Divisão began on March 8 and was finished in the final match on June 28. All games are played at the Dili Municipal Stadium.

== Stadiums ==
- Primary venues used in the Liga Futebol Amadora:

Dili
Municipal Stadium
Capacity: 5,000
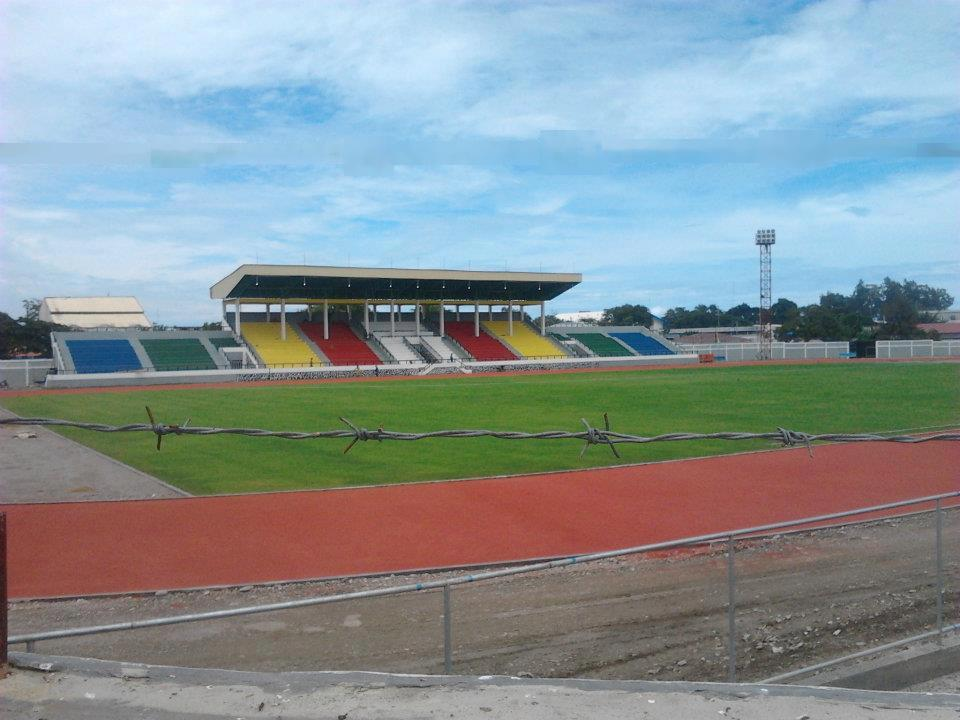

== Locations ==
Locations of the 2016 Liga Futebol Amadora teams.
Primera Divisao
Segunda Divisao

== Primera Divisao ==
Primera Divisaun
- Season: 2016
- Champions: SL Benfica (1st)
- Relegated: FC Aitana, DIT F.C.
- AFC Cup: Sport Laulara e Benfica
- Matches: 56
- Goals: 139 (2.48 per match)
- Top goalscorer: Patrich Wanggai (Karketu, 10 goals)
- Biggest home win: Académica 3–1 Aitana (25 February 2016); Ponta Leste 3–1 Porto Taibesi (5 March 2016)
- Biggest away win: D.I.T. 1–3 Karketu Dili (4 March 2016)
- Highest scoring: Porto Taibesi 2–3 SLB (28 February 2016); Aitana 3–2 Carsae (3 March 2016); Académica 3–2 Carsae (17 March 2016); Carsae 3–2 Porto Taibesi (16 April 2016)
- Longest winning run: 4 games Porto Taibesi
- Longest unbeaten run: 5 games Ponta Leste
- Longest winless run: 4 games Aitana; Karketu Dili
- Longest losing run: 2 games Aitana; Carsae; D.I.T. Karketu Dili; Porto Taibesi
- All statistics correct as of 24 July 2016.

=== Teams ===
After qualifying the playoffs, there are 8 teams that will play in this league.

Club	City / Area
Aitana	Dili
Académica	Dili
Carsae	Dili
D.I.T.	Dili
Karketu Dili	Dili
Ponta Leste	Dili
Porto Taibesi	Dili
Sport Laulara e Benfica	Laulara, Aileu

=== League table ===
Pos	Team	Pld	W	D	L	GF	GA	GD	Pts	Qualification or relegation
1	SLB Laulara (C)	14	5	6	3	22	18	+4	21	2018 AFC Cup
2	Karketu Dili	14	5	6	3	18	14	+4	21	
3	Porto Taibesse	14	6	3	5	16	16	0	21	
4	Académica	14	5	5	4	18	17	+1	20	
5	Ponta Leste	14	6	2	6	16	18	−2	20	
6	Carsae	14	5	4	5	17	15	+2	19	
7	D.I.T. (R)	14	4	5	5	16	16	0	17	Relegation to the 2017 Segunda Divisao
8	Aitana (R)	14	3	3	8	16	25	−9	12	Relegation to the 2017 Segunda Divisao

Updated to match(es) played on 31 July 2016. Source: Liga Futebol Amadora
Rules for classification: 1) points; 2) goal difference; 3) number of goals scored.
(C) Champions; (R) Relegated

=== Result table ===
Home \ Away	ACA	AIT	CAR	DIT	KAR	POL	POR	SLB
Académica		3–1	3–2			1–1	0–1	1–2
Aitana			3–2	0–1	2–2	1–1		1–2
Carsae				1–0	1–0		2–3	1–1
D.I.T.	0–0				1–3	0–1	1–2	
Karketu Dili						2–1	1–2	0–0
Ponta Leste							3–1	2–1
Porto Taibesse								2–3
SLB Laulara								

Updated to match(es) played on 22:00, 24 April 2016. Source:
Legend: Blue = home team win; Yellow = draw; Red = away team win.

== Segunda Divisao ==
Segunda Divisaun
- Season: 2016
- Champions: Cacusan CF (1st)
- Promoted: Cacusan CF, FC Zebra
- Matches: 38
- Goals: 154 (4.05 per match)
- Biggest home win: YMCA 6-0 Benfica Dili (12 June 2016)
- Biggest away win: Atlético Ultramar 2-8 Zebra (31 March 2016); Santa Cruz 1-7 Café (27 April 2016); Nagarjo 0-6 Cacusan (19 May 2016)
- Highest scoring: Atlético Ultramar 2-8 Zebra (31 March 2016)
- Longest winning run: 5 matches, Cacusan CF
- Longest unbeaten run: 6 matches, Cacusan CF
- Longest winless run: 5 matches, FC Nagarjo
- Longest losing run: 3 matches, FC Nagarjo; Sporting Clube de Timor; União de Timor; Sport Dili e Benfica
- All statistics correct as of 28 June 2016.

=== Teams ===
After qualifying the playoffs, there are 13 teams that will play in this league.

Club	City / Area
Assalam	Nafatin, Dili
Atlético Ultramar	Manatuto
Cacusan	Becora, Dili
Kablaky	Same, Manufahi
Café	Ermera
Lica-Lica Lemorai	Viqueque
Nagarjo	Dili
Santa Cruz	Dili
Sport Dili e Benfica	Dili
Sporting Clube de Timor	Dili
União de Timor	Dili
YMCA	Dili
Zebra	Baucau

=== Group A ===
Pos	Team	Pld	W	D	L	GF	GA	GD	Pts	Qualification
1	YMCA FC	5	3	2	0	12	3	+9	11	Advance to Playoff (Note: Due to have the same points and the same goal difference and head to head both are balanced, YMCA FC and FC Zebra participated in a playoff game to determine who is promoted to the 2017 Primeira Divisão and qualify for the final.)
2	FC Zebra (O, P)	5	3	2	0	12	3	+9	11	Advance to Playoff
3	Atlético Ultramar	5	3	0	2	14	11	+3	9	
4	Sporting Clube de Timor	5	1	1	3	3	10	−7	4	
5	Sport Dili e Benfica	5	1	1	3	8	16	−8	4	
6	ADR União	5	1	0	4	4	10	−6	3	

Updated to match(es) played on 30 June 2016. Source: Segunda Divisao
Rules for classification: 1) points; 2) goal difference; 3) number of goals scored.
(O) Play-off winners; (P) Promoted
Notes:

Playoff

Team 1	Score	Team 2
YMCA FC	0-3	FC Zebra

=== Group B ===
Pos	Team	Pld	W	D	L	GF	GA	GD	Pts	Promotion or qualification
1	Cacusan CF (C, P)	6	5	1	0	25	9	+16	16	Promotion to 2017 LFA and Advance to Final
2	Assalam FC	6	3	2	1	16	10	+6	11	
3	Lica-Lica Lemorai	6	3	1	2	12	8	+4	10	
4	FC Café	6	1	4	1	14	13	+1	7	
5	FC Kablaky	6	1	2	3	13	20	−7	5	
6	Santa Cruz FC	6	1	2	3	9	20	−11	5	
7	FC Nagarjo	6	0	2	4	6	15	−9	2	

Updated to match(es) played on 30 June 2016. Source: Segunda Divisao
Rules for classification: 1) points; 2) goal difference; 3) number of goals scored.
(C) Champions; (P) Promoted

=== Final ===
Team 1	Score	Team 2
FC Zebra	1-2	Cacusan CF
