= AS Marca FC =

AS Marca
- Full name: AS Marca
- Founded: 2019; 7 years ago
- Chairman: Sasonin Nison Auto Parts,Sousa TL
- League: Liga Futebol Timor-Leste Primeira Divisão
- 2025: 7th
Home colours	Away colours

AS Marca FC is a professional football club of East Timor based in Díli. The club currently plays in the Liga Futebol Timor-Leste Primeira Divisão.

== History ==
=== 2019 ===
==== Foundation ====
Formed in 2019 for the LFA Terceira Divisão dispute, the teams debuted on November 8 playing against the YMCA FC team for the first round of the competition.

==== Promotion ====
With three wins and a draw, the AS Marca FC team achieved the best campaign in group B and was promoted to LFA Segunda together with the team Emmanuel FC, first place in group A.

=== 2020 ===
In 2020, due to the COVID-19 pandemic, the Liga Futeból Timor-Leste (LFTL) held only 2 official competitions: the 2020 Taça 12 de Novembro and the 2020 Copa FFTL. 2020 Copa FFTL was a way found by the FFTL to replace the LFA Primeira, LFA Segunda competitions.

==== Copa FFTL ====
Copa FFTL included all eight LFA Primeira teams and 12 LFA Segunda teams.

AS Marca FC participated in the competition for having won the promotion to LFA Segunda in 2019.

The team debuted in the competition on August 30, 2020, against the AS Ponta Leste team and got scared, AS Ponta Leste won 7–0.

Despite the bad debut, ASMARCA ended up recovering and finished the group stage in second place, thus achieving the classification for the next stage.

However, the team was not so lucky in the quarter-finals and ended up eliminated from the competition after losing to the Lalenok United team by the score of 6–0.

== Players ==
Below are a list of known players set to compete in the 2026 Liga Futebol Timor-Leste

Coach: Jose C. Da Fonseca

Note: Flags indicate national team as defined under FIFA eligibility rules; some limited exceptions apply. Players may hold more than one non-FIFA nationality.

No.	Pos.	Nation	Player
—	DF	BRA	Celio Guilherme
—	DF	TLS	Jose Alegria Carlos
—	DF	IDN	Nyongky Momoh
—	GK	TLS	Tonito Tavares
—	DF	TLS	Denilson Castro
—	DF	TLS	Filomario Mucasana
—	DF	TLS	Fabrizio Santos
—	DF	TLS	Natanael Barros
—	DF	TLS	Joao Batista Reis
—	DF	TLS	Ezaquiel Belo
—	DF	NGA	Okhai Oibo Godspower

No.	Pos.	Nation	Player
—	DF	NGA	Barnabas A. Friday
—	DF	IDN	Hendrikus B. Ari Atok
—	DF	IDN	Leonijo A. Da Cruz
—	DF	IDN	Servinus V. Klau
—	DF	TLS	Florindo Mango
—	DF	TLS	Ricardo Martins
—	GK	TLS	Jose Miro Vicente
—	DF	TLS	Marcio Caero
—	DF	TLS	Janiel Fernandes
—	DF	TLS	Gabriel Omar
—	DF	TLS	Joaojinho Cristiano

== Competition records ==
Competitive records from RSSSF

Season	Competition	Pld	W	D	L	GF	GA	GD	Pts	Position	National Cup: Taça 12 de Novembro
2019	Terceira Divisão	4	3	1	0	14	3	11	10	1st in Group B (Promoted)	-
2020	Copa FFTL	4	2	0	2	5	11	-6	6	2nd in Group B (Qualified) Quarter-Finals	Round of 16
2021	Segunda Divisão	4	1	0	3	3	6	-3	3	4th in Group A	-
2023	Segunda Divisão	7	6	1	0	10	3	+7	19	2nd (Promoted)	-
2025	Primeira Divisão	9	2	4	3	6	8	-2	10	7th	-
