= Fuiloro =

Suco and village on the northeastern tip of East Timor

Coordinates: 8°30′30″S 126°59′24″E

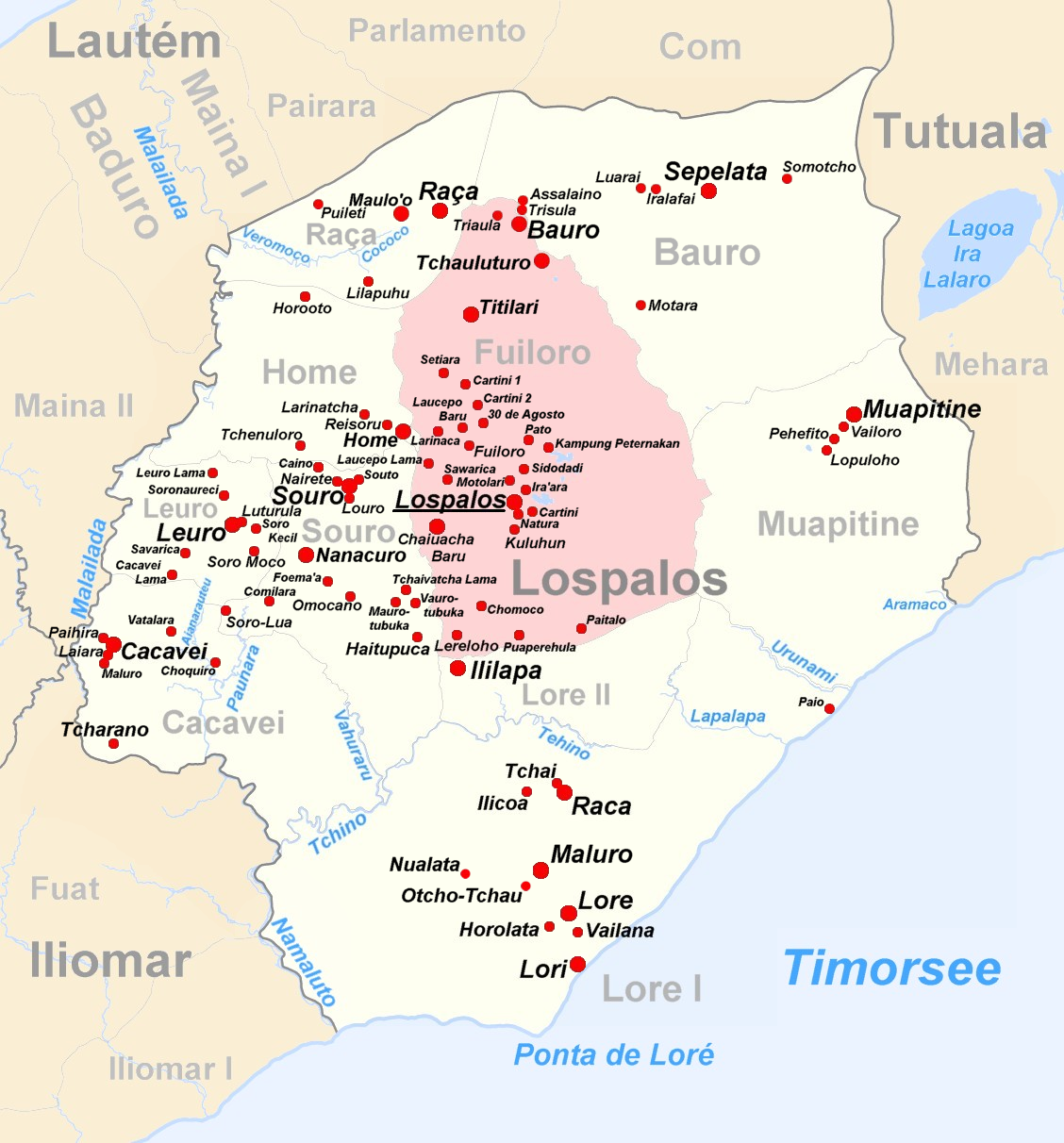
Subdistrict of Lospalos

Fuiloro is a suco and village on the northeastern tip of Timor-Leste. The district capital Lospalos lies in the suco of Fuiloro.

There is an old Portuguese fort at Fuiloro village, where there is also an arched entry. At the entrance to the village, there is a traditional Fataluku-style house on the side of the road. The Don Bosco College is situated in Fuiloro.

Abisu (Vila-De-Avis, Fuiloro) Airfield, a short distance to the west of the village on the road to Lautém, was constructed prior to World War II with two strips. During the war, Japanese Army Air Force (JAAF) bombers used it for forward operations. It is still in use as Abisu or Fuiloro Airport (ICAO: WPFL).

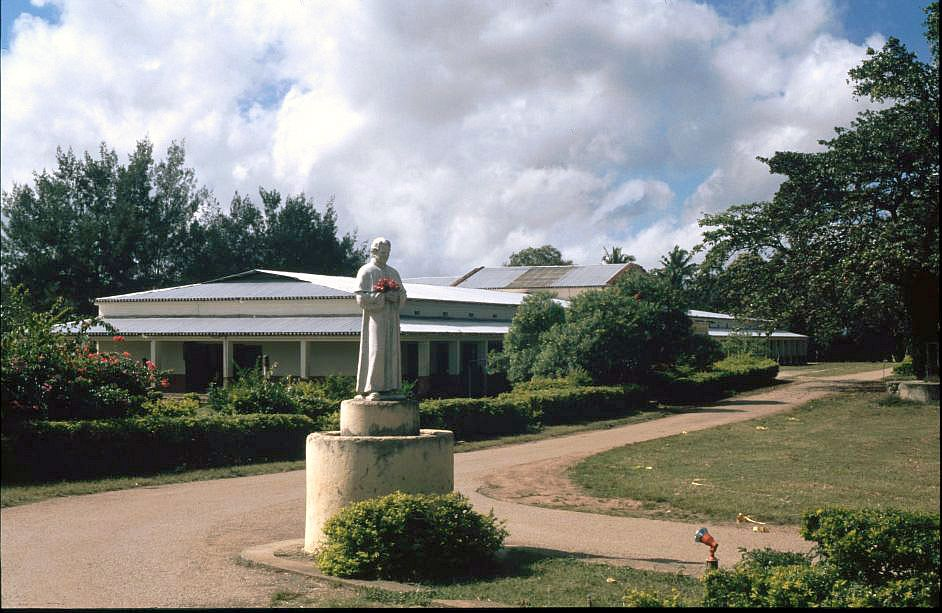
Don Bosco College in Fuiloro

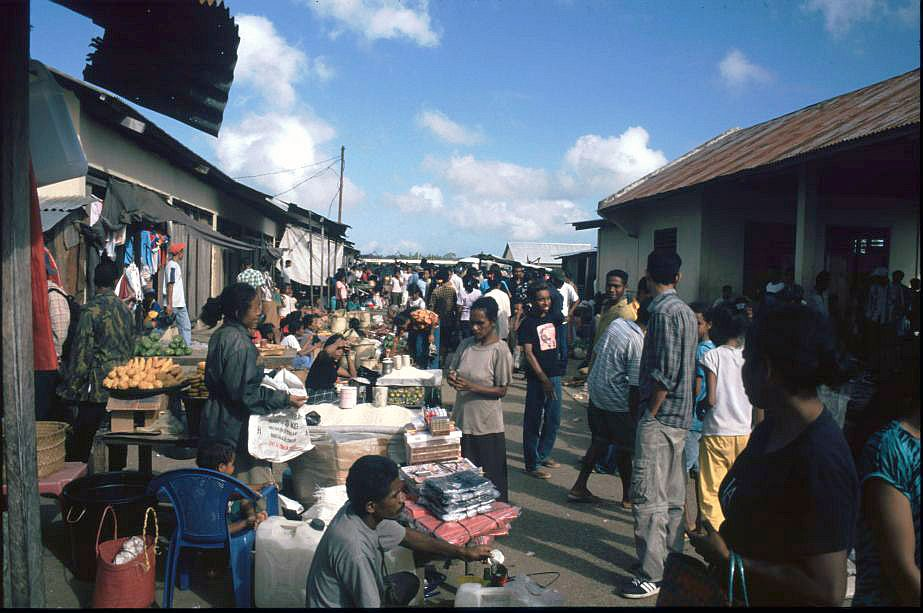
Market in Kural, between Lospalos and Fuiloro

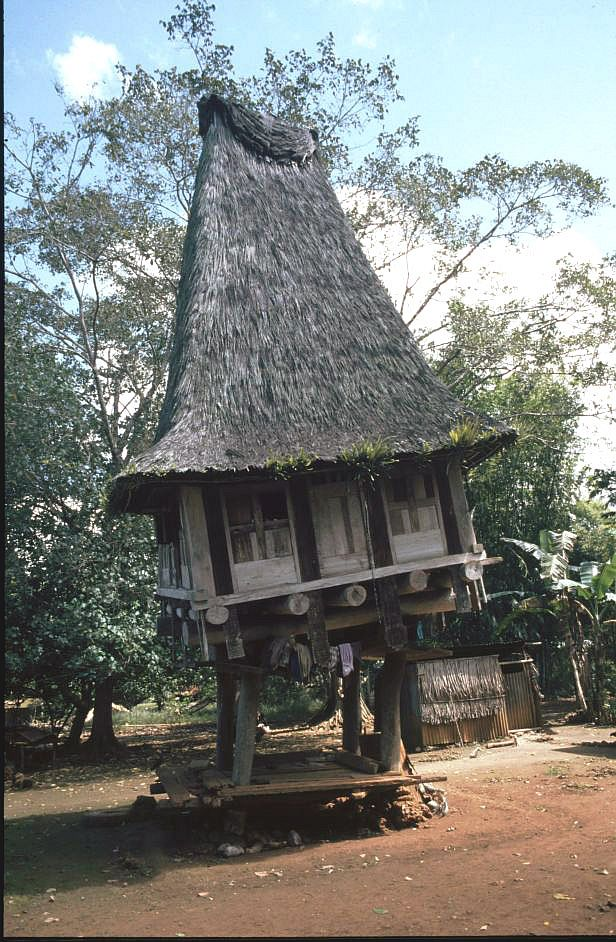
Holy house in Titi Lari (Suco Fuiloro)
