= AD Ermera =

Football club in East Timor

- Full name: Associação Desportiva Ermera
- Founded: 2010; 16 years ago
- League: Taça Digicel
Home colours	Away colours

AD Ermera or Associação Desportiva Ermera is a football club of East Timor come from Ermera. The team plays in the Taça Digicel.
