= San Francesco di Paola, Venice =

Church in Venice, Italy

San Francesco di Paola
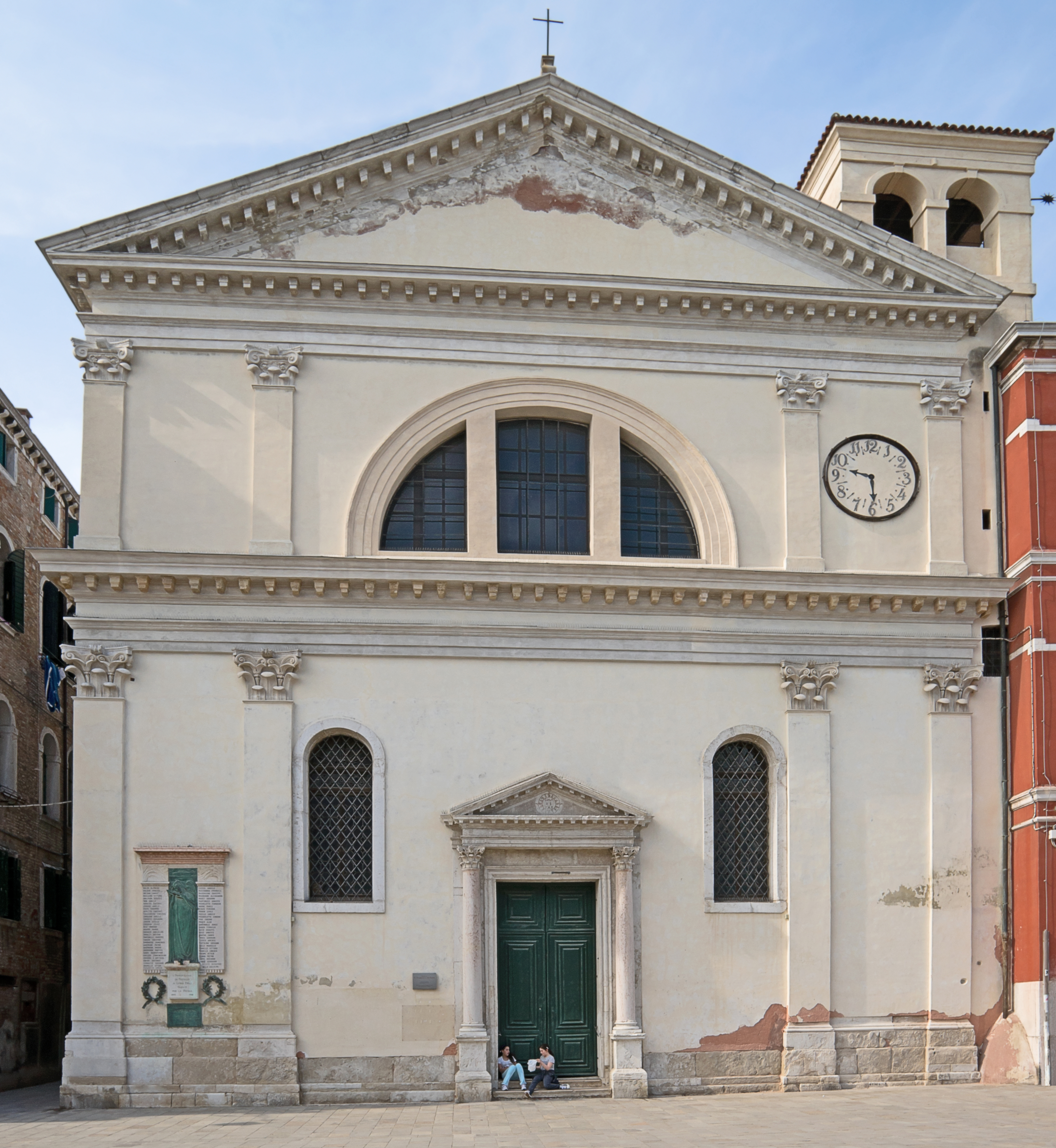
- Facade

- Location within Venice Location within Italy

Religion
- Affiliation: Roman Catholic
- Province: Venice

Location
- Location: Venice, Italy
- Interactive map of San Francesco di Paola
- Coordinates: 45.4326°N 12.3542°E

San Francesco di Paola is a Roman Catholic church in Via Garibaldi in the Sestiere of Castello in Venice, Italy.

== History ==
In 1291, the bishop of Castello, Bartolomeo Querini, endowed the construction of a hospice for the elderly. It was erected on the left shore of the Rio de Castello and flanking this hospital, rises an oratory dedicated to St Bartholomew. In the second half of the 14th century rose a church dedicated to the same saint. In 1588, the church was placed on the Order of Minims of San Francesco di Paola, who refurbished, and in 1618 reconsecrated the church to St Francis of Paul. The adjacent monastery was suppressed in 1806, and razed in 1885. An elementary school now stands in its place.

== Art and Architecture ==
The church has a classical facade with two orders and a triangular tympanum. A clock painted at 9:30 AM is on the facade.

The interior has a number of canvases, many depicting the miracles of the Saint:The saint Resuscitates a Child (1748) by Francesco Solimena; Exorcism of a Possessed (1748) by Giandomenico Tiepolo;Virgin, St John the Evangelist and Donors by Jacopo Palma il Giovane; St Francis resuscitates his disciple Tommaso di Ture, crushed by a tree (1746) by Vincenzo Canal. Other works in the church were attributed to Alvise dal Treviso (copy), Marco Zanchi, and Bartolommeo Litterini. The ceiling is painted by Giovanni Contarini with biblical subjects and events in the life of San Francesco of Paola. The presbytery vault frescoes are by Michele Schiavone. The altar had two statues, one of St Bartholemew apostle by Alvise Catajapiera and the other of St Mark evangelist by Giorgio Morlaiter.

== Bibliography ==
Le chiese di Venezia, Marcello Brusegan; Ed. Newton
