= AD Ainaro =

East Timorese football club

- Full name: Associação Desportiva Ainaro
- Founded: 2010; 16 years ago
- League: Taça Digicel
Home colours	Away colours

AD Ainaro or Associação Desportiva Ainaro is a football club of East Timor from Ainaro. The team plays in the Taça Digicel.
