= Jean-M.-Vincent Audin =

French Roman Catholic writer and historian (1793–1851)

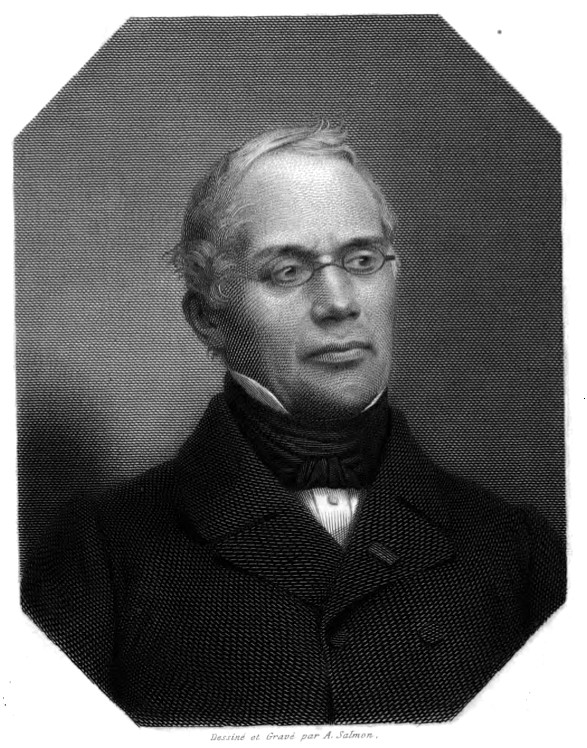
Jean-Marie-Vincent Audin

Jean-Marie-Vincent Audin (1793–1851), was a French Roman Catholic author, journalist, and historian.

== Biography ==
He was born in Lyon in 1793. He first studied theology in the seminary of Argentière, and afterward pursued the study of law. He passed his law examination but never practiced the legal profession, having decided to enter on a literary career.

He soon left his native city and settled in Paris, where he opened a bookstore and at the same time was active with his pen. He died in Paris on 21 February 1851.

== Writings ==
His first publications, concerning the French Revolution, Napoleon and the Bourbon Restoration, were "La lanterne magique" (1811); "Blanc, bleu et rouge" (1814) and a "Tableau historique des événements qui se sont accomplis depuis le retour de Bonaparte jusqu'au rétablissement de Louis XVII" (1815). He contributed to the "Journal de Lyon" founded by Pierre-Simon Ballanche.

Once in Paris, he first published articles of a political cast, and historical tales in the style of the time, such as "Michel Morin et la Ligue"; "Florence ou la Religieuse"; "Le Régicide" and others.

He then took up historical writing, his first work of this kind is "Le Concordat entre Léon X et François I" (1821), which is, for the most part, a translation of the Concordat between pope Leo X and renaissance king Francis I of France. This was followed by his "Histoire de la St. Barthélemy" (2 volumes, 1826) on the St. Bartholomew's Day Massacre of 24 August 1572. These two works were fairly well-received although some ecclesiastical critics accused him of being too favorable to the Protestants. Audin publicly defended himself against this imputation and asserted his firm belief in the doctrines of the Catholic Church.

He now began his most important work, the history of the Protestant Reformation, which he published from 1839 to 1842 in four books, as follows: # "Histoire de la vie, des ouvrages et de la doctrine de Luther" (2 volumes, Paris, 1839; 2d ed., 3 volumes, 1850) on Martin Luther

1. "Histoire de la vie, des ouvrages et de la doctrine de Calvin" (2 volumes, 1841; 2d ed., 1851) on John Calvin
2. "Histoire de Léon X et de son siecle" (2 volumes, 1844; 2d ed., 1851) on pope Leo X's time
3. "Histoire de Henri VIII et du schisme d'Angleterre" (2 volumes, 1847; 2d ed., 1862) on Henry VIII Tudor and the Anglican Schism.

The author claims to have based his statements upon researches which he made in the archives of various European cities, especially in the archives of the Vatican. The work shows that this assertion cannot be accepted in its entirety. The volumes are written in a romantic manner, and contain many particulars which sober criticism has long proved to go false. Johann Joseph Ignaz von Döllinger said of the work on Luther: "Audin's work is written with an extraordinary and at times almost naive ignorance of Luther's writings and contemporary literature, and of the general condition of Germany at that period" (Kirchenlexikon, s.v. Luther).

=== List of works ===
- M. Richard (1840). Traveller's Classical Guide Through France. Paris: Maison, successeur de Audin. + index
