= FC Audin =

- Full name: Futebol Clube Audin
- League: Super Liga
- 2005–06: 5th (Group A)

FC Audin is a football club of East Timor. The team plays in the Timorense Liga Pre.
