= AD Viqueque =

East Timorese football club

- Full name: Associação Desportiva Viqueque
- Founded: 2010; 16 years ago
- League: Taça Digicel
Home colours	Away colours

AD Viqueque or Associação Desportiva Viqueque is a football club of East Timor come from Viqueque. The team plays in the Taça Digicel.
