= AD Baucau =

- Full name: Associação Desportiva Baucau
- Founded: 2010 (15 years ago)
- League: Taça Digicel
Home colours	Away colours

AD Baucau or Associação Desportiva Baucau is a football club of East Timor come from Baucau. The team plays in the Taça Digicel.
