= AD Bobonaro =

- Full name: Associação Desportiva Bobonaro
- Founded: 2010; 15 years ago
- League: Taça Digicel
Home colours	Away colours

AD Bobonaro or Associação Desportiva Bobonaro is a football club of East Timor from Bobonaro. The team plays in the Taça Digicel.
