= AD Cova Lima =

East Timorese football club

- Full name: Associação Desportiva Cova Lima
- Founded: 2010; 16 years ago
- League: Taça Digicel
Home colours	Away colours

AD Cova Lima or Associação Desportiva Cova Lima is a football club of East Timor from Cova Lima. The team plays in the Taça Digicel.
