= AD Manatuto =

- Full name: Associação Desportiva Manatuto
- Founded: 2010; 15 years ago
- League: Taça Digicel
Home colours	Away colours

AD Manatuto or Associação Desportiva Manatuto is a football club of East Timor from Manatuto. The team plays in the Taça Digicel.
