= AD Dili Oeste =

- Full name: Associação Desportiva Dili Oeste
- Nickname(s): The Dili Rhinoceros
- Founded: 2010; 15 years ago
- Ground: Municipal Stadium, Dili
- Capacity: 5,000
- League: Taça Digicel
Home colours	Away colours

AD Dili Oeste or Associação Desportiva Dili Oeste is a football club of East Timor. The team plays in the Taça Digicel.
