= AD Aileu =

East Timorese football club

- Full name: Associação Desportiva Aileu
- Founded: 2010; 16 years ago
- League: Taça Digicel
Home colours	Away colours

AD Aileu or Associação Desportiva Aileu is a football club of East Timor from Aileu. The team plays in the Taça Digicel.
