= AD Liquica =

East Timorese football club

- Full name: Associação Desportiva Liquica
- Founded: 2010; 16 years ago
- League: Taça Digicel
Home colours	Away colours

AD Liquica or Associação Desportiva Liquica is a football club of East Timor from Liquiçá. The team plays in the Taça Digicel.
