= AD Manufahi =

- Full name: Associação Desportiva Manufahi
- Founded: 2010; 15 years ago
- League: Taça Digicel
Home colours	Away colours

AD Manufahi or Associação Desportiva Manufahi is a football club of East Timor come from Manufahi. The team plays in the Taça Digicel.
