= AD Oecusse =

Football club in East Timor

- Full name: Associação Desportiva Oecusse
- Founded: 2010; 16 years ago
- League: Taça Digicel
Home colours	Away colours

AD Oecusse or Associação Desportiva Oecusse is a football club of East Timor from Oecusse. The team plays in the Taça Digicel.
