= Sport Dili e Benfica =

ASD Benfica
- Full name: Asociação Sport Dili e Benfica
- Founded: 1938; 87 years ago
- Ground: Municipal Stadium, Dili
- Capacity: 5,000
- Chairman: Fernando da Encarnação
- Manager: Romeo Costa
- League: LFA2
- 2017: 6th in Group A
Home colours	Away colours

Asociação Sport Dili e Benfica, commonly known as Benfica Dili is an East Timorese football club based in Dili. The team plays in the Liga Futebol Amadora.

== Honours ==
- Taça A.C.A.I.T. champions: 1968
- Taça de Timor champions: 1968
- Tormeo de Abertura champions: 1968

== Competition records ==
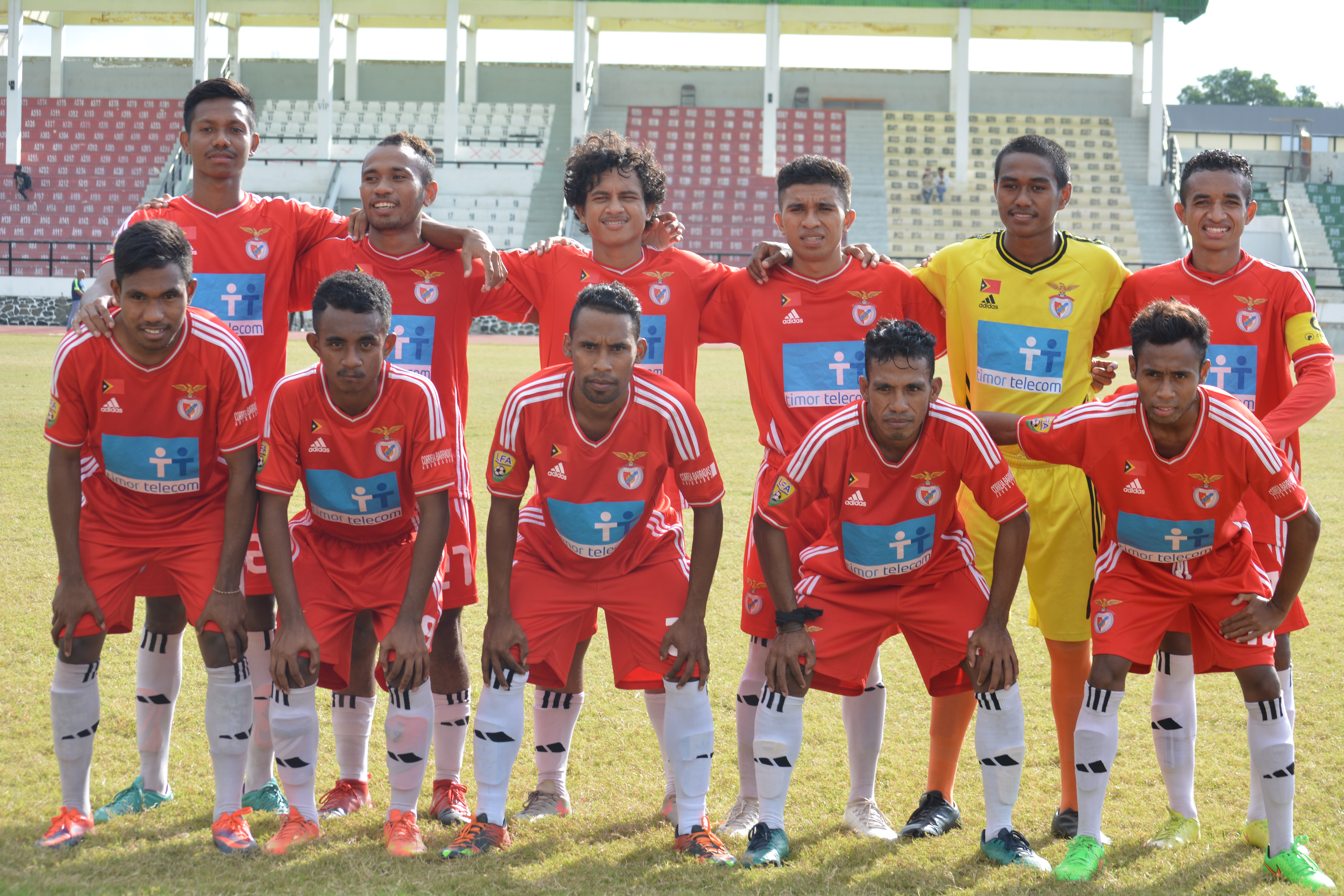
Players of the Timorese club Sport Dili e Benfica

=== Liga Futebol Amadora ===
- 2016 Segunda Divisao: 5th in Group A

=== Taça 12 de Novembro ===
- 2016: 2nd Round

== Former coaches ==
- Joao Godinho

== Sponsors ==
- Timor Telecom
