= Giovanni Contarini =

Italian painter (1549–1605)

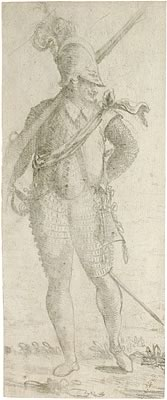
Standing Soldier, drawing in black chalk by Giovanni Contarini

Giovanni Contarini (1549–1605) was an Italian painter of the late Renaissance.

== History ==
Born in Venice, Contarini was a contemporary of Palma il Giovane. He was a great student of the works of Tintoretto and Titian and is declared to have been an exact imitator of Titian. According to an old story he was so extremely accurate in his portraits that on "sending home one he had taken of Marco Dolce, his dogs began to fawn upon it, mistaking it for their master". Contarini's work is extremely mannered, soft and sweet, but distinguished by beautiful, rich coloring and executed very much on the lines of Titian's painting. His finest picture is in the Louvre, having been removed from the ducal palace at Venice, and represents the Virgin and Child with St Mark and St Sebastian, and the Doge of Venice, Marino Grimani, kneeling before them. Other paintings of his are in the galleries at Berlin, Florence, Milan, and Vienna, and in many of the churches at Venice. He painted easel-pictures of Greek and Roman mythological subjects, which are treated with propriety and discretion but are peculiarly lacking in force and strength; in many of the palaces in Venice he decorated ceilings.

Some years of his life were passed at the court of the Emperor Rudolf II, with whom he was a great favorite and by whom he was knighted.

His work has been described by one writer as a "combination of sugar, cream, mulberry juice, sunbeam and velvet". The Catholic Encyclopedia counters that one or two of his works, for example the "Resurrection" in the church of San Francesco di Paola at Venice, can claim to be masterly.
