= Kuda Ulun FC =

- Full name: Kuda Ulun Futebol Clube
- Nickname: The Horses
- Founded: 2019; 7 years ago
- League: LFA Terceira
- 2019: 6th, group A
Home colours	Away colours

Kuda Ulun FC is an East Timorese professional football club of the Bobonaro, based in the Kuda Ulun district. The team plays in the Liga Futebol Amadora Terceira Divisão.

== Competition records ==
=== Liga Futebol Amadora ===
- LFA Terceira 2019: 6th place, group A

=== Copa FFTL ===
- 2024: 1st in Group C, Lost in Quarter Finals
