= San Francesco di Paola, Milan =

Church building in Milan, Italy

Coordinates: 45.47°N 9.19°E

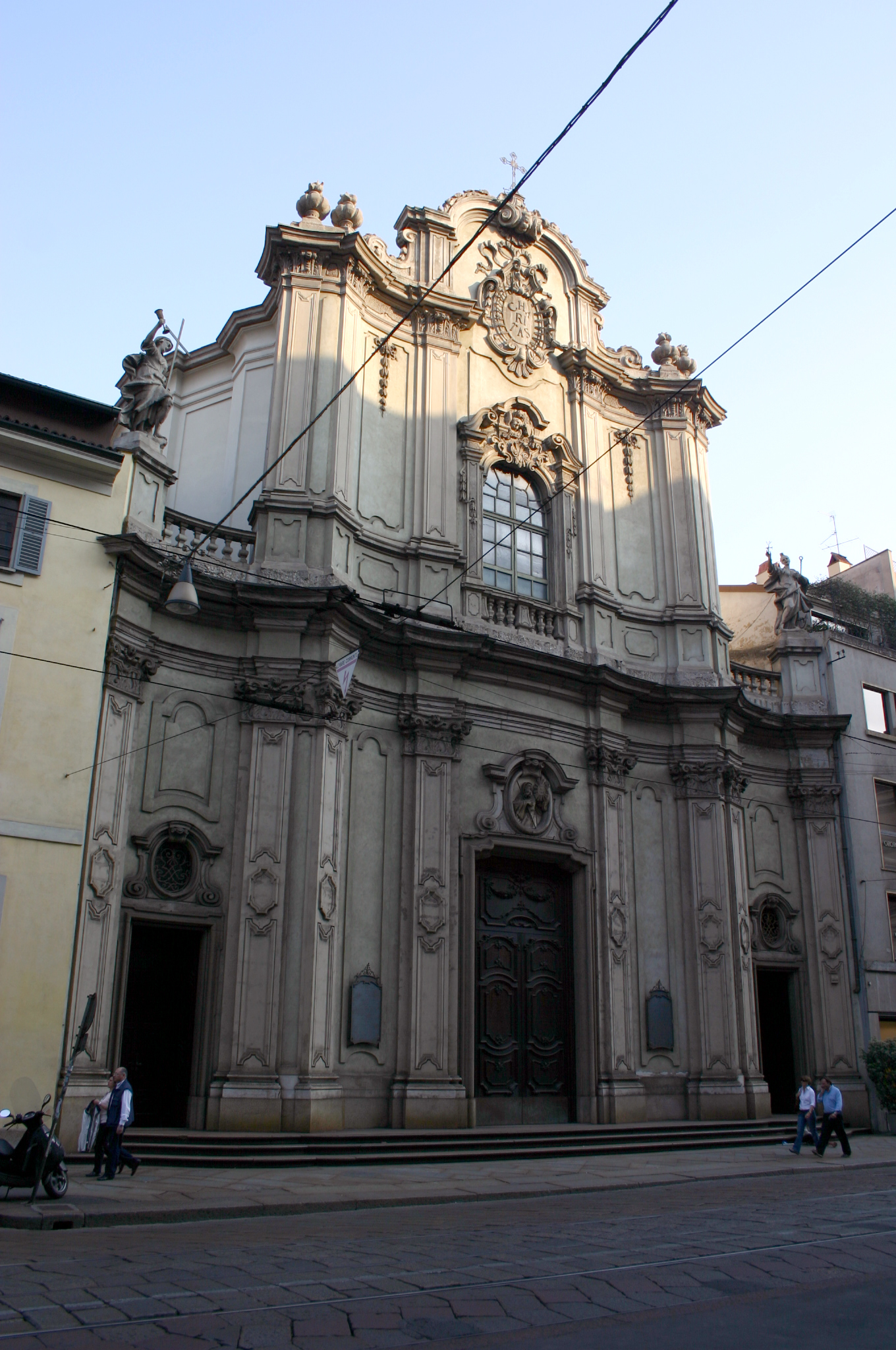
8903 - Milano - Via Manzoni - San Francesco di Paola - Foto Giovanni Dall'Orto 14-Apr-2007.jpg

San Francesco di Paola is a Baroque style, Roman Catholic church located on Via Manzoni in Milan, Italy.

== History ==
An oratory dedicated to San Anastasia was destroyed by a fire in 1623. The present church was commissioned by the Minims and constructed began in 1728, using designs by Marco Antonio Bianchi. The top of the facade remains unfinished until additions by Emilio Alemagna in 1891. The church was complete and consecrated in 1735.

The interior has a richly decorated baroque decor. The main altar has an altarpiece depicting the Madonna and child with St Michael Archangel, and St Francis of Paola by Giacomo Guerrini. The oval bas-reliefs depicting the Miracles of St Francis of Paola were completed by 1753 by Gaetano Perego. The paintings in the church library depicting the Triumph of Art and Science (1754) were completed by Giovanni Antonio Cucchi. He also painted an altarpiece depicting St Francis of Sales. The sacristy ceiling is frescoed by Francesco Guala with the Assumption of the Virgin (1756-1757). Guala also painted canvases with Christ in the Garden and the Christ with Crown of Spines. The nave ceiling was frescoed by Giuseppe Giudici with the Glory of St Francis of Paola.

In 1804, the Minims were suppressed. The church and adjacent convent were used as an asylum for infants.

Here were celebrated the funerals of Giuseppe Verdi in 1901.

The church suffered damage during a bombing in 1943.
