= FC Beltratez Lospalos =

FC Beltatrez
- Full name: Futebol Clube Beltatrez
- Nicknames: Rei da Cidade (Indonesian: Raja Kota; English: King of City)
- Founded: 19 June 2004; 21 years ago
- Ground: Beltatrez Field, Lospalos
- Capacity: 1,000
- League: Oxford Diversity Football League
- 2018/19: 7th
Home colours

FC Beltatrez or Futebol Clube Beltatrez is an amateur football club of East Timor based in Oxford, England.

== History ==
The club was initially founded in Lospalos, within the Lautem District of Timor Leste in 2004. During this time the team played in local competitions within the nation, including within the Campeao Regiao Leste in 2007. The club continued to play within East Timor until 2009.

As of 2012 the club has been reestablished within Oxford, England as a Timorese representative side within the area. In 2018 the team competed within the Oxford Diversity Football League, finishing in 7th place out of the 9 competing teams.

== Team ==
Current squad as of 2019

Name
Alvaro Freitas
Anto Costa
Zetyty Magalaens
Jhony Martins
Valdo Savio
Marzi Cruz
Arcanjo da Conceicao
Arnaldo de Jesus
Aquino Fonseca
Famos
Januario
Apoly Marquez
Ezequel
Lucino Xavier Gomes

== Links ==
Facebook Page
