= AD Maubisse =

East Timorese football club

- Full name: Associação Desportiva Maubisse
- League: LFA Terceira
- 2019: 2nd, group A

AD Maubisse is a professional football club of East Timor based in Maubisse. The team plays in the Liga Futebol Amadora Terceira Divisão.

== Competition records ==
- LFA Terceira 2019: 5th places in Groub A
