= Re-Lay Laleia FC =

- Full name: Re-Lay Laleia Futebol Clube
- Founded: 2019; 7 years ago
- League: LFA Terceira
- 2019: 6th, group A

Re-Lay Laleia Futebol Clube, formerly known as Laleia United FC, is a professional football club of East Timor of the Manatuto based in the Laleia district. The team plays in the Liga Futebol Amadora Terceira Divisão.

== Competition records ==
Season	Competition	Pld	W	D	L	GF	GA	GD	Pts	Position	National Cup: Taça 12 de Novembro
2019	Terceira Divisão	5	0	0	5	2	15	-13	0	6th in Group A	
2024	Copa Falintil	Quarter Finals									
2024	Taca Rotativa XG	3	1	0	2	2	5	-3	3	3rd in Group A	
2024	Copa FFTL	3	2	1	0	7	2	5	7	3rd Place	
2025	Taca Rotativa XG	3	2	0	1	8	8	0	6	3rd in Group A	
2025	Terceira Divisão	3	1	0	2	4	6	-2	3	3rd in Group A	

=== Liga Futebol Amadora ===
- LFA Terceira 2019: 6th, group A

=== Copa FFTL ===
- 2024: 3rd Place
