= Lospalos =

- City
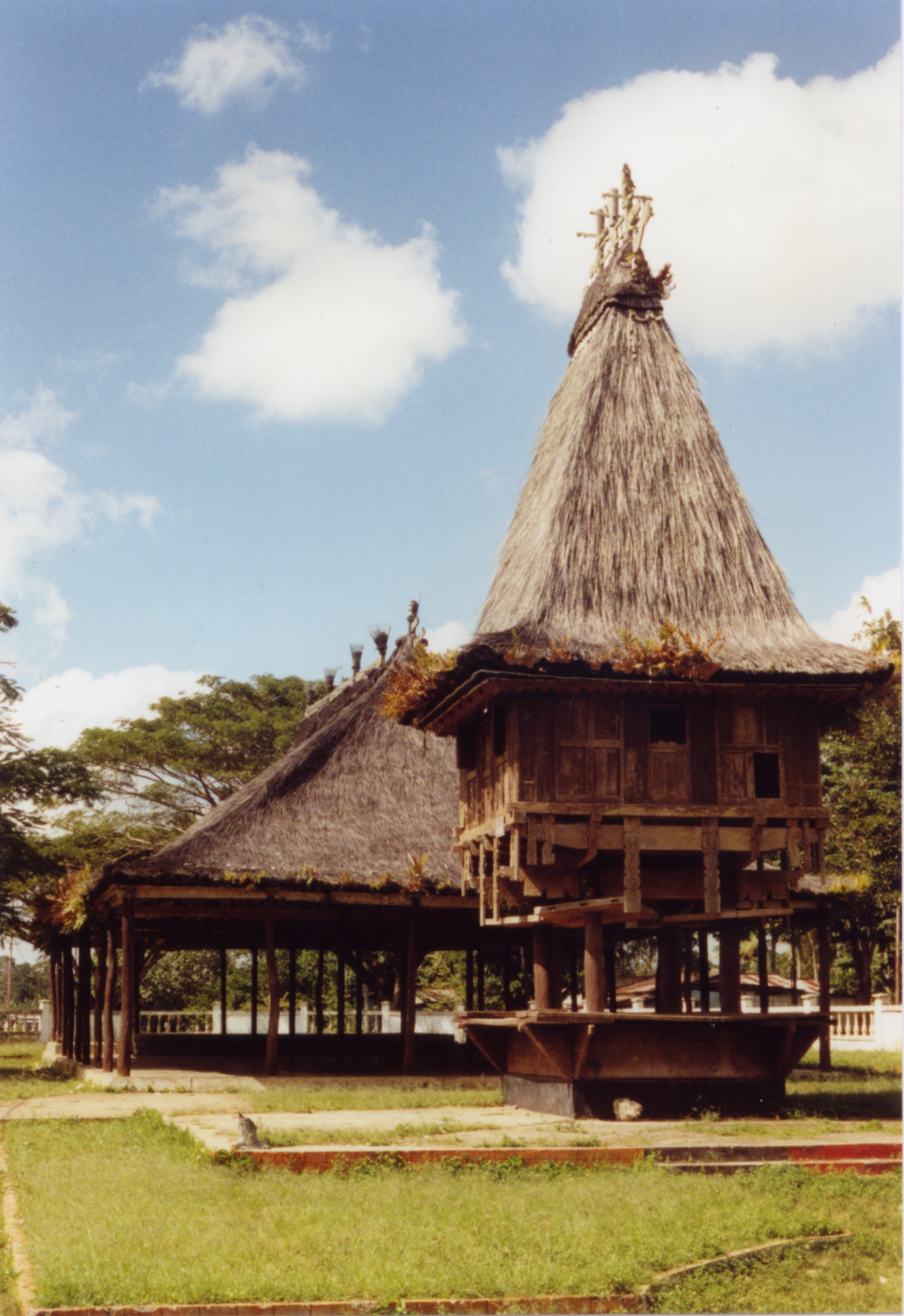
- Sacred house in Lospalos

- Location within East Timor
- Coordinates: 8°31′20″S 126°59′51″E
- Country: Timor-Leste
- Municipality: Lautém
- Administrative post: Lospalos

Area
  - Total: 623.93 km^{2} (240.90 sq mi)
- Elevation: 346 m (1,135 ft)

Population (2015 census)
  - Total: 12,665
  - Density: 20.299/km^{2} (52.574/sq mi)
- Time zone: UTC+09:00 (TLT)
- Climate: Aw

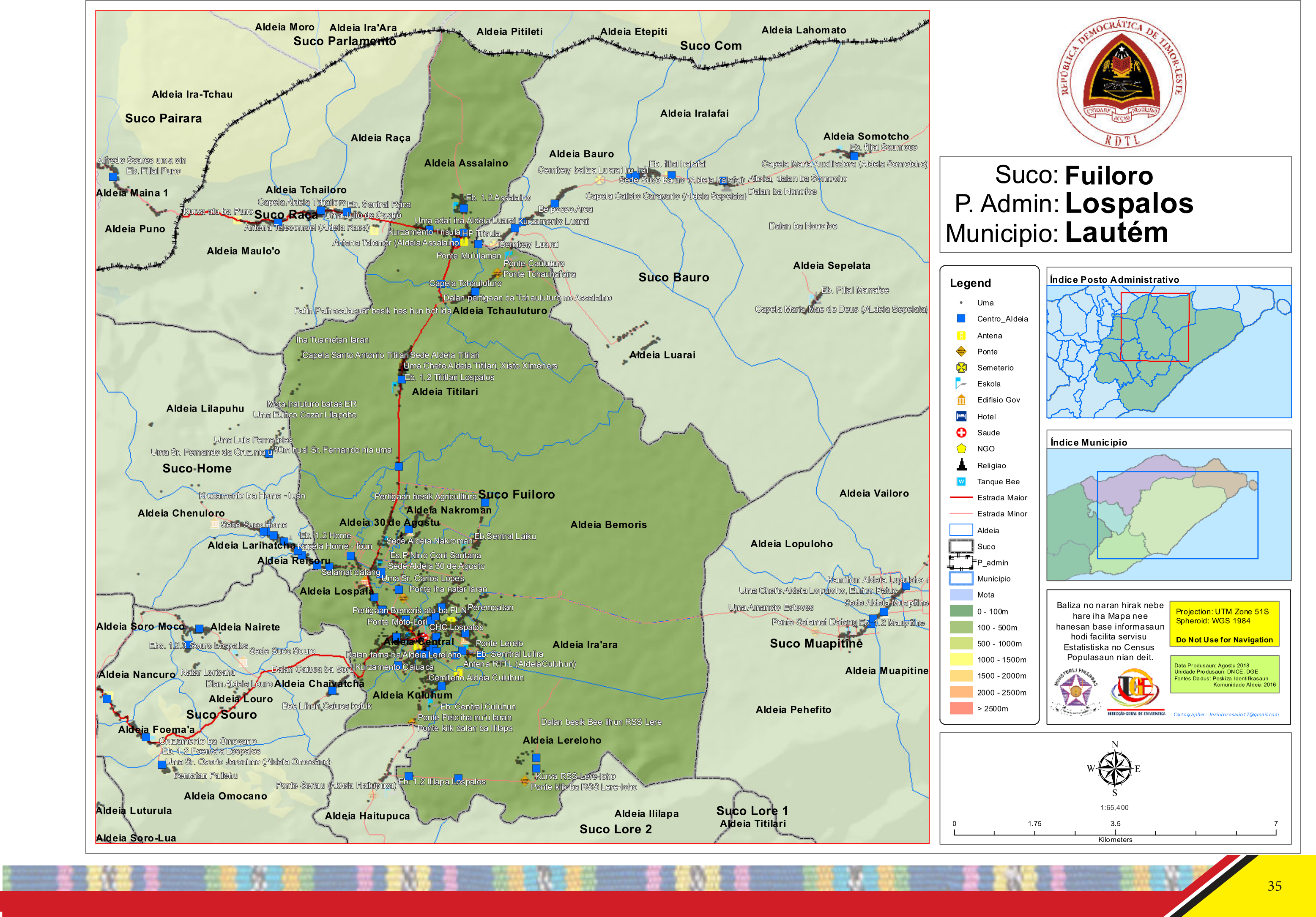
Suco of Fuiloro with the city of Lospalos

Lospalos (sometimes erroneously written as Los Palos, assuming a nonexistent Spanish etymology) is a city in Timor-Leste, 248 kilometres (154 mi) to the east of Dili, the national capital. Lospalos has a population of 17,186 (2006) and is the capital of Lautém Municipality and the Lospalos Administrative Post. The subdistrict has a population of 25,417 (2004).

Internationally, "Lospalos" is mistakenly spelled as Los Palos, suggesting a Spanish origin of the name. In fact, it is derived from Lohoasupala, the name in Fataluku, the local Papuan language, although nowadays Fataluku speakers use the name Lospala. The preferred spelling in English, as well as Tetum and Portuguese, the official languages of Timor-Leste, is Lospalos.

Lospalos is the hometown of King Cipriano Monteiro da Costa "Ratu-Mimiraka" (approx.1890–1953), the King of the Souro Tribes of Watchumura Rato clan. He was a leader with a strong and firm character. During the Portuguese colonial period, King Cipriano was chosen as the representative of all the kings of Lautém in the decision to make Lospalos the capital of the Lautém municipality. The decision to select Lospalos as the capital was influenced by his belief that "water truly flows from the mountains to the sea, rather than from the sea to the mountains," meaning that water, a vital resource for human survival, should be sourced from the highlands. Thus, Lospalos, located in the highlands, was chosen as the source of water for the region. King Cipriano was known for his wisdom, strong leadership, and civilized nature during the Portuguese colonial era. The Portuguese colonial government recognized him as a king of great intelligence in organization, as well as a person with a noble soul.

Lospalos is also the birthplace of José dos Santos "LOY", a Timorese combatant and the former Regional Commander of Ponta Leste from 1975 to 1977. He was born on September 20, 1945, in Nanakuru, Souro Village.

Lospalos is the birth city of the co-founder and president of the party APODETI, Frederico Almeida Santos Costa.

== Climate ==
Lospalos has a tropical savanna climate (Köppen Aw) with a dry season from August to October and a wet season covering the remaining nine months.

Climate data for Lospalos
Month	Jan	Feb	Mar	Apr	May	Jun	Jul	Aug	Sep	Oct	Nov	Dec	Year
Mean daily maximum °C (°F)	29.2 (84.6)	29.0 (84.2)	29.4 (84.9)	29.3 (84.7)	28.3 (82.9)	27.5 (81.5)	27.3 (81.1)	27.9 (82.2)	29.5 (85.1)	30.9 (87.6)	31.2 (88.2)	30.4 (86.7)	29.2 (84.5)
Daily mean °C (°F)	25.8 (78.4)	25.6 (78.1)	25.6 (78.1)	25.3 (77.5)	24.4 (75.9)	23.6 (74.5)	23.1 (73.6)	23.2 (73.8)	24.3 (75.7)	25.4 (77.7)	26.4 (79.5)	26.3 (79.3)	24.9 (76.8)
Mean daily minimum °C (°F)	22.5 (72.5)	22.2 (72.0)	21.8 (71.2)	21.4 (70.5)	20.6 (69.1)	19.7 (67.5)	19.0 (66.2)	18.6 (65.5)	19.1 (66.4)	19.9 (67.8)	21.7 (71.1)	22.3 (72.1)	20.7 (69.3)
Average rainfall mm (inches)	216 (8.5)	214 (8.4)	220 (8.7)	234 (9.2)	283 (11.1)	186 (7.3)	89 (3.5)	21 (0.8)	7 (0.3)	19 (0.7)	81 (3.2)	209 (8.2)	1,779 (69.9)
Source: Climate-Data.org

== Sport ==
=== Football ===
- FC Beltratez Lospalos

== Notable people ==
=== Politicians and activists ===
- Albina Marçal Freitas, activist, freedom fighter, and former member of parliament for the National Congress for Timorese Reconstruction party
