= Taça Digicel =

- Founded: 2010; 16 years ago
- Country: Timor Leste
- Confederation: AFC
- Number of clubs: 14
- Level on pyramid: 3
- International cup: AFC President's Cup
- Current champions: Ad. Dili Leste
- Most championships: Ad. Dili Leste (2 title)
- Broadcaster(s): TVTL
- Current: 2011 Taça Digicel

Taça Digicel (English: Digicel Cup) was a football championship organized by the East Timor Football Federation. It was replaced by Taça 12 de Novembro in 2013.

== About The League ==
The Digicel sponsored cup, or "TAÇA DIGICEL" as it is called, was played 14 teams selected from the 13 districts.

DIGICEL, the telecommunication company, has prepared US$10.000 for the prices. According to local newspaper Timor Post, the champion of the tournament will win US$5000 while the runner up will only get US$2.500. The best team will be rewarded US$500 and both the best player and top scorer will collect US$375 each.

According to the Newspaper, DIGICEL has signed a four-year contract with Timor Leste’s football federation (FFTL) to hold the league annually. The FFTL, on the other hand, is expecting to harness talented Timorese footballer from the league.

For the first ever Timorese League experience, the 14 clubs are divided into three pools. The teams playing in pool A will be Dili Leste, Aileu, Viqueque and Covalima. Oecussi, Bobonaru, Lautem and Manufahi will play Baucau in pool B. Dili Oeste will play Liquiça, Ainaro, Manatuto and Ermera.

== List of Participating team in TAÇA DIGICEL 2011 ==
- Ad. Dili Leste
- Ad. Viqueque
- Ad. Aileu
- Ad. Cova Lima
- Ad. Baucau
- Ad. Bobonaro
- Ad. Manufahi
- Ad. Oecusse
- Ad. Dili Oeste
- Ad. Liquica
- Ad. Ainaro
- Ad. Manatuto
- Ad. Ermera
- Ad. Lautem

== List of Champions ==
- 2010: Ad. Dili Leste
- 2011: Ad. Dili Leste
