= AS Inur Transforma =

- Full name: AS Inur Transforma
- League: LFA Terceira

AS Inur Transforma is a professional football club from East Timor based in Díli. The team plays in the Liga Futebol Amadora Terceira Divisão.

== Competition records ==
=== Liga Futebol Amadora ===
- LFA Terceira 2019: 3rd place in Groub A
