= AD Dili Leste =

- Full name: Associação Desportiva Dili Leste
- Nickname: The Crazy Deer
- Founded: 2010 (16 years ago)
- Ground: Municipal Stadium, Dili
- Capacity: 5,000
- League: Taça Digicel
- 2010: 1st, Champions
Home colours	Away colours

AD Dili Leste or Associação Desportiva Dili Leste is a football club of East Timor from Dili. The team plays in the Taça Digicel.
