= AC Mamura =

- Full name: Atlético Clube Mamura
- Ground: National Stadium (East Timor)
- League: LFA Terceira
- 2019: 2nd, group A

AC Mamura is a professional football club of East Timor based in Díli, in the Pite neighborhood. The team plays in the Liga Futebol Amadora Terceira Divisão.

== Competition records ==
Season	Competition	Pld	W	D	L	GF	GA	GD	Pts	Position	National Cup: Taça 12 de Novembro
2019	Terceira Divisão	5	4	0	1	12	5	7	12	2nd in Group A	-
2025	Copa Naval	Quarter Finals									
2025	Terceira Divisão	4	3	0	1	9	4	5	9	2nd in Group C (Promoted)	

=== Liga Futebol Amadora ===
- LFA Terceira 2019: 2nd place in Group A
