= Liga Futebol Timor-Leste Terceira Divisão =

- Founded: 2019
- Country: Timor Leste
- Confederation: AFC
- Number of clubs: 11 (2019)
- Level on pyramid: 3
- Promotion to: Segunda Divisão
- Domestic cup(s): Taça 12 de Novembro; Super Taça
- Current champions: Emmanuel FC (1st title) (2019)

Liga Futebol Timor-Leste Terceira Divisão, often referred to as the Terceira Divisão, is the third division of the Liga Futebol Timor-Leste. The division serves as a promotion pathway into the Segunda Divisão and has taken many forms including a league and knockout formats.

In 2020 the competition was renamed from the Liga Futebol Amadora to the Liga Futebol Timor-Leste.

== History ==
=== 2017 Promotion Playoff ===
Prior to the formation of the Terceira Divisão, in 2017 the Liga Futebol Amadora featured a Segunda Divisao Promotion Playoff. This format consisted of a 12 team knockout playoff competition, with the top 3 teams being promoted. These teams ended up being Fitun Estudante, FC Lero and Lalenok United.

=== 2019 Formation of the Terceira Divisão ===
In 2019, the Liga Futebol Amadora Terceira Divisão was officially announced. This edition of the competition featured 11 teams, being split into two groups; the winners of each group being promoted to the Segunda Divisao. The teams that were promoted included Emmanuel FC and AS Marca FC. Following this season however the Terceira Divisão would not continue into the next season, with the entire Timorese league system being replaced by the Copa FFTL.

=== 2025-26 Segunda Divisão Qualifiers ===
In 2025, the Liga Futebol Timor-Leste announced the return of the Terceira Divisão, with the league being open to registration from any local teams. Two teams are set to be promoted to the Segunda Divisao, replacing the bottom two relegated teams from that division.

A total of 39 teams registered to compete in the Segunda Divisão Qualifiers, including both local amateur teams as well as teams that had previously featured in the Liga Futebol Timor-Leste league system in previous years.

== Clubs (2019) ==
The following clubs competed in the 2019 season, as Emmanuel FC and AS Marca were promoted.

- Emmanuel FC
- AC Mamura
- AS Inur Transforma
- Karau Fuik FC
- AD Maubisse
- Laleia United FC
- AS Marca FC
- YMCA FC
- AS Lero
- Kuda Ulun FC
- ADR União
