= AS Lero =

- Full name: Associazione Sportiva Lero
- Nickname(s): AS Lero (Lautém)
- Ground: Lautém District Ground
- League: LFA Terceira
- 2019: 3rd, group B
| Home colours | Away colours |

AS Lero is a Timorese professional football club from Lautém District. The team plays in the Liga Futebol Amadora Terceira Divisão.

== Competition records ==
=== Liga Futebol Amadora ===
- LFA Terceira 2019: 3rd place, group B
