= Karau Fuik FC =

- Full name: Karau-Fuik Futebol Clube
- Ground: Viqueque Stadium
- Capacity: 5.000
- League: LFA Terceira
- 2019: 4th, group A

Karau Fuik FC is a professional football club of East Timor based in Viqueque. The team plays in the Liga Futebol Amadora Terceira Divisão.

== Competition records ==
=== Liga Futebol Amadora ===
- LFA Terceira 2019: 4th places in Groub A
