= ADR União de Timor =

ADR União
- Full name: Associação Desportiva e Recréativa União de Timor
- Founded: 1955; 71 years ago
- Ground: Municipal Stadium, Dili
- Capacity: 5,000
- Manager: Francisco da Costa Xavier
- League: Liga Futebol Amadora Terceira Divisão
Home colours	Away colours

ADR União or Associação Desportiva e Recréativa Uniao de Timor is an East Timorese professional football club based in Dili. The club plays at Liga Futebol Amadora.

== Honours ==
- Campeonato Nacional da 3ª Divisão champions: 1964–65

== Competition records ==
=== Liga Futebol Amadora ===
- 2016: 6th place in Groub A Segunda Divisao

=== Taça 12 de Novembro ===
- 2016: 1st Round

== Former coaches ==
- Di Paola (1961–1970)
