= YMCA FC (Timor-Leste) =

- Full name: Young Man’s Christian Academic Futebol Clube
- Founded: 2006; 19 years ago
- Ground: Municipal Stadium, Dili
- Capacity: 5,000
- League: Liga Futebol Amadora Terceira Divisão
Home colours	Away colours

YMCA FC is a professional football club of Timor-Leste based in Dili. The team plays in the Liga Futebol Amadora.

== Competition records ==
=== Liga Futebol Amadora ===
- 2016: 2nd, group A Segunda Divisao

=== Taça 12 de Novembro ===
- 2016: 2nd round
