= 2015–16 Foolad F.C. season =

Foolad
2015–16 season
- Chairman: Seifollah Dehkordi
- Manager: Dragan Skocic
- Stadium: Ghadir Stadium
- Persian Gulf Pro League: 14th
- Hazfi Cup: Round 4
- Top goalscorer: Soroush Rafiei (2 goals); Mathias Chago (2 goals); Hossein Ebrahimi (2 goals)
- Highest home attendance: 13,000 (25 August 2015 against Persepolis (Persian Gulf Pro League))
- Lowest home attendance: 0 (11 September 2014 against Zob Ahan)
- Average home league attendance: League: 3,300 All: 3,000
Home colours	Away colours	Third colours

The 2015–16 season are Foolad's 14th season in the Persian Gulf Pro League. They competed in the Hazfi Cup which they were eliminated by Esteghlal in Round 4. Foolad is captained by Leonard Mesaric.

== Players ==
Last updated on 21 April 2015

Under-23 players	Under-21 players

Out during the season (injured/ transferred)

No.	Name	Nationality	Position	Since	Date of birth (age)	Signed from
Goalkeepers
1	Alireza Salimi	(Iran)	GK	2010	23 February 1984 (age 42)	Tarbiat Yazd
33	Mehrdad Bashagardi	(Iran)	GK	2015	3 September 1984 (age 42)	PAS Hamedan
31	Farzad Tayebipour	(Iran)	GK	2014	?	Youth system
Defenders
27	Reza Ahmadi	(Iran)	DF	2015	10 February 1993 (age 33)	Youth system
3	Leonard Mesaric (captain)	(Croatia)	DF	2014	10 August 1983 (age 43)	Lokomotiva, Croatia
17	Abdollah Nasseri	(Iran)	DF	2008	20 May 1992 (age 34)	Foolad Novin
15	Mathias Chago	(Cameroon)	DF	2012	13 March 1983 (age 43)	Lokomotiva, Croatia
19	Bahman Kamel	(Iran)	DF	2014	19 January 1986 (age 40)	Naft Tehran
21	Omid Khaledi	(Iran)	DF	2011	29 October 1988 (age 38)	Shahin Ahvaz
24	Mehrdad Jama'ati	(Iran)	DF	2009	7 October 1987 (age 39)	Youth system
44	Mohammad Ahle Shakhe	(Iran)	DF	2014	2 July 1993 (age 33)	Youth system
33	Soroush Saeidi	(Iran)	DF	2014	2 July 1991 (age 35)	Youth system
70	Mohammad Reza Khanzadeh	(Iran)	DF	2015	11 May 1991 (age 35)	Persepolis
16	Aref Aghasi	(Iran)	DF	2015	?	Foolad Novin
Midfielders
5	Mehdi Badrlou	(Iran)	AM	2013	14 January 1986 (age 40)	Saba Qom
88	Amirhossein Feshangchi	(Iran)	MF	2015	7 January 1987 (age 39)	Paykan
10	Esmaeil Sharifat	(Iran)	MF	2012	6 June 1988 (age 38)	Esteghlal
7	Hossein Ebrahimi	(Iran)	MF	2015	3 August 1990 (age 36)	Naft Tehran
14	Shahab Karami	(Iran)	MF	2012	16 March 1991 (age 35)	Shahrdari Yasuj
29	Ali Sina Rabbani	(Iran)	MF	2009	16 January 1993 (age 33)	Youth system
32	Hadi Habibinejad	(Iran)	MF	2014	17 October 1995 (age 31)	Youth system
15	Yousef Vakia	(Iran)	MF	2012	30 September 1993 (age 33)	Youth system
30	Mahmoud Motlaghzadeh	(Iran)	MF	2015	11 May 1994 (age 32)	Youth system
11	Akbar Imani	(Iran)	MF	2015	21 March 1992 (age 34)	Zob Ahan
Forwards
8	Sasan Ansari	(Iran)	FW	2010	4 May 1991 (age 35)	Youth system
9	Iman Mousavi	(Iran)	FW	2014	2 June 1989 (age 37)	Gostaresh
29	Bahman Jahantigh	(Iran)	FW	2014	14 March 1995 (age 31)	Youth system
23	Hossein Maleki	(Iran)	FW	2015	6 April 1990 (age 36)	Naft MIS
2	Mehdi Daghagheleh	(Iran)	FW	2015	30 January 1990 (age 36)	Persepolis

== Transfers ==
=== In ===
No	P	Nat	Name	Age	Moving from	Ends	Transfer fee	Type	Transfer window	Source
23	FW	(Iran)	Hossein Maleki	25	Naft MIS	2016	N/A	Transfer	Summer	
2	MF	(Iran)	Mehdi Daghagheleh	26	Persepolis	2016	N/A	Transfer	Summer	
7	MF	(Iran)	Hossein Ebrahimi	25	Naft Tehran	2018	Free	Transfer	Summer	
30	MF	(Iran)	Mahmoud Motlaghzadeh	21	Foolad Novin	2015	Free	Transfer	Summer	
11	MF	(Iran)	Akbar Imani	23	Zob Ahan	2016	Free	Transfer	Winter	
70	DF	(Iran)	Mohammad Reza Khanzadeh	24	Persepolis	2016	Free	Transfer	Summer	
17	DF	(Iran)	Abdollah Nasseri	23	Foolad Novin	2017	Free		Summer	
33	GK	(Iran)	Mehrdad Bashagardi	31	PAS Hamedan	2016	Free	Transfer	Summer	
88	MF	(Iran)	Amirhossein Feshangchi	29	Paykan	2016	Free	Transfer	Summer	
14	FW	(Cameroon)	Dorge Kouemaha	32	Lierse (Belgium)	2016	?	Transfer	Summer	
16	DF	(Iran)	Aref Aghasi	20	Foolad Novin	2017	Free	Transfer	Summer	

=== Out ===
No	P	Nat	Name	Age	Moving to	Transfer fee	Type	Transfer window	Source
77	MF	(Iran)	Mohsen Mosalman	25	Zob Ahan	Returned	Loan	Summer	
4	MF	(Iran)	Ayub Vali	28	Free agent	N/A	Released	Summer	
9	FW	(Iran)	Iman Mousavi	27	Siah Jamegan	Free	Transfer	Summer	
2	DF	(Iran)	Ahmad Alenemeh	33	Free agent	N/A	Released	Summer	
14	MF	(Iran)	Shahab Karami	24	Malavan	N/A	Loan	Summer	
63	GK	(Iran)	Ershad Yousefi	34	Mes Kerman	Free	Transfer	Summer	
99	FW	(Iran)	Mohammad Ghazi	31	Saba Qom	Free	Transfer	Summer	
7	MF	(Iran)	Soroush Rafiei	25	Tractor Sazi	N/A	Loan	Summer	
11	MF	(Iran)	Bakhtiar Rahmani	26	Tractor Sazi	N/A	Loan	Summer	
17	FW	(Cameroon)	Aloys Nong	32	Naft Tehran	Free	Transfer	Summer	
33	DF	(Iran)	Soroush Saeidi	24	Fajr Sepasi	N/A	Loan	Summer	
22	GK	(Iran)	Behnam Mousavi	?	Esteghlal Ahvaz	Free	Transfer	Summer	

== Pre-season and friendlies ==
Date	Opponents	H / A	Result F–A	Scorers
15 July 2015	(Turkey) Eskişehirspor	N	W 0 – 3	Sharifat 14', Ebrahimi 41' (pen), Jahantigh 54'
20 July 2015	(Uzbekistan) Olmaliq	N	W 1 – 0	?
24 July 2015	(Turkmenistan) Balkan	N	W 3 – 0	?

== Competitions ==
=== Persian Gulf Pro League ===
==== League table ====
Pos	Team	Pld	W	D	L	GF	GA	GD	Pts	Qualification or relegation
10	Padideh	30	10	9	11	30	35	−5	39	
11	Sepahan	30	8	14	8	29	30	−1	38	
12	Foolad	30	9	8	13	26	37	−11	35	
13	Siah Jamegan	30	7	6	17	23	34	−11	27	
14	Malavan (R)	30	5	12	13	23	35	−12	27	Relegation to 2016–17 Azadegan League

Updated to match(es) played on 13 May 2016. Source: IPL Stats
Rules for classification: 1) points; 2) goal difference; 3) number of goals scored.
(R) Relegated

==== Results summary ====
Overall								Home						Away					
Pld	W	D	L	GF	GA	GD	Pts	W	D	L	GF	GA	GD	W	D	L	GF	GA	GD
30	9	8	13	24	35	−11	35	6	3	6	12	17	−5	3	5	7	12	18	−6

Last updated: 13 May 2016.
Source: Ipl Stats

==== Results by round ====
Round	1	2	3	4	5	6	7	8	9	10	11	12	13	14	15	16	17	18	19	20	21	22	23	24	25	26	27	28	29	30
Ground	H	A	H	A	H	H	A	H	A	H	A	H	A	H	A	A	H	A	H	A	A	H	A	H	A	H	A	H	A	H
Result	D	D	L	D	L	L	L	L	L	W	L	L	W	L	D	D	W	W	W	L	D	W	L	D	W	W	L	W	L	D
Position	4	8	13	14	16	16	16	16	16	15	15	15	15	14	14	14	13	13	13	13	13	12	13	12	12	12	12	12	12	12

Updated to match(es) played on 13 May 2016. Source: "Ipl".
A = Away; H = Home; W = Win; D = Draw; L = Loss

==== Matches ====
Win Draw Loss Postponed

Date Round	Home	Score	Away	Location

31 July 2015 1	Foolad	2–2	Rah Ahan	Ahvaz
17:30	Vakia (yellow card); Chago 83'; Badrlou 83'	Summary	Koohnavard (yellow card); Mehdizadeh (yellow card); Mohammadi 52'; Manouchehri 61'; Irannejad (yellow card)	Stadium: Ghadir Stadium; Referee: (Iran) Mouood Bonyadifar

6 August 2014 2	Padideh	1–1	Foolad	Mashhad
16:00	Kheiri (yellow card); Moradmand 90'	Summary	Ebrahimi (yellow card) (goal) 89'	Stadium: Samen Stadium; Referee: (Iran) Mehdi Seyedali

14 August 2014 3	Foolad	0–2	Esteghlal Khuzestan	Ahvaz
19:55	Ebrahimi (yellow card); Ansari (yellow card); Sharifat (yellow card)	Summary	Tayyebi (yellow card); Coulibaly (yellow card); Beyt Saeed 53'; Kaabi (yellow card); Janfaza 90+4'	Stadium: Ghadir Stadium; Referee: (Iran) Ahmad Salehi

20 August 2015 4	Sepahan	1–1	Foolad

25 August 2015 5	Foolad	0–2	Persepolis

15 September 2015 6	Foolad	0–3	Zob Ahan

24 September 2015 7	Saipa	1–0	Foolad

16 October 2015 8	Foolad	1–2	Tractor Sazi

October 21, 2015 9	Saba Qom	2–1	Foolad

October 27, 2015 10	Foolad	1–0	Siah Jamegan

31 October 2015 11	Malavan	1–0	Foolad

20 November 2015 12	Foolad	0–2	Esteghlal

30 November 2015 13	Esteghlal Ahvaz	1–2	Foolad

13 December 2015 14	Foolad	1–2	Naft Tehran

18 December 2015 15	Gostaresh Foulad	1–1	Foolad

27 December 2015 16	Rah Ahan	1–1	Foolad

1 January 2016 17	Foolad	1–0	Padideh

29 January 2016 18	Esteghlal Khuzestan	0–1	Foolad

7 February 2016 19	Foolad	1–0	Sepahan

12 February 2016 20	Persepolis	1–0	Foolad

18 February 2016 21	Zob Ahan	1–1	Foolad

4 March 2016 22	Foolad	1–0	Saipa

10 March 2016 23	Tractor Sazi	3–2	Foolad

24	v

25	v

26	v

27	v

28	v

29	v

30	v
