= 2013–14 Foolad F.C. season =

Foolad
2013–14 season
- Chairman: Seifollah Dehkordi
- Manager: Hossein Faraki
- Stadium: Ghadir Stadium
- Iran Pro League: 1st
- Hazfi Cup: Quarter-Final
- AFC Champions League: Round of 16
- Top goalscorer: League: Chimba (9 goals); All: Chimba (15 goals)
- Highest home attendance: 50,205 (April 6, 2014 against Esteghlal)
- Lowest home attendance: 11,789 (October 8, 2013 against Damash Gilan)
- Average home league attendance: 37,933
Home colours	Away colours	Third colours

The 2013–14 season were the Foolad's 12th season in the Pro League, and their 6th consecutive season in the top division of Iranian Football. They also be competed in the Hazfi Cup which were knockout in the semi-finals by Tractor Sazi and AFC Champions League in Round of 16 by Al-Sadd. Foolad F.C. was captained by Bakhtiar Rahmani and won the league title at the end of the season.

== Squad ==
=== Iran Pro League squad ===
As of January 14, 2014 Note: Flags indicate national team as defined under FIFA eligibility rules; some limited exceptions apply. Players may hold more than one non-FIFA nationality.

No.	Pos.	Nation	Player
1	GK	IRI	Alireza Salimi
2	DF	BRA	Leandro Padovani
4	DF	IRI	Ayub Vali
5	MF	IRI	Mehdi Badrlou
6	DF	IRI	Mehdi Noori
7	MF	IRI	Soroush Rafiei
8	FW	IRI	Esmaeil Sharifat
9	MF	IRI	Abbas Mohammadrezaei
10	DF	IRI	Abdullah Karami
11	MF	IRI	Bakhtiar Rahmani ^{U23} (Captain)
13	GK	IRI	Ershad Yousefi
14	MF	IRI	Shahab Karami ^{U23}
15	MF	BRA	Leandro Chaves
16	FW	IRI	Arash Afshin
17	DF	IRI	Abolhassan Jafari

No.	Pos.	Nation	Player
20	MF	IRI	Ayub Kalantari ^{U23}
21	DF	IRI	Omid Khaledi
23	FW	IRI	Sasan Ansari ^{U23}
24	DF	IRI	Mehrdad Jamaati
26	DF	IRI	Yousef Vakia ^{U21}
27	DF	IRI	Soroush Saeidi ^{U23}
29	FW	BRA	Chimba
30	MF	IRI	Ahmad Abdollahzadeh ^{U21}
31	GK	IRI	Milad Homayouni ^{U21}
32	MF	IRI	Valid Mashayzadeh ^{U21}
33	DF	IRI	Vafa Hakhamaneshi ^{U23}
35	FW	IRI	Mehdi Niyayesh Pour ^{U23}
37	FW	IRI	Gholamreza Rezaei
55	DF	IRI	Saeed Salarzadeh
77	GK	IRI	Sosha Makani

- U21 = Under 21 Player
- U23 = Under 23 Player

==== Loan list ====
Note: Flags indicate national team as defined under FIFA eligibility rules; some limited exceptions apply. Players may hold more than one non-FIFA nationality.

No.	Pos.	Nation	Player
—	DF	IRI	Amir Sharafi (to Hafari Ahvaz until the end of the 2013–14 season)

== Transfers ==
=== In ===
No	P	Nat	Name	Age	Moving from	Ends	Transfer fee	Type	Transfer window	Source
37	FW	(Iran)	Gholamreza Rezaei	29	Persepolis	2016	$680,000	Transfer	Summer	
55	DF	(Iran)	Saeed Salarzadeh	31	Malavan	2015	Free	Transfer	Summer	
3	DF	(Brazil)	Leandro Padovani	30	Loan return	2016	Free	Transfer	Winter	
7	FW	(Iran)	Arash Afshin	25	Loan return	2018	Free	Transfer	Winter	
77	GK	(Iran)	Sosha Makani	27	Naft Tehran	2017	$700,000	Transfer	Winter	

=== Out ===
No	P	Nat	Name	Age	Moving to	Transfer fee	Type	Transfer window	Source
7	FW	(Iran)	Arash Afshin	25	Sepahan	N/A	Loan	Summer	
3	DF	(Brazil)	Leandro Padovani	30	Al Rayyan (Qatar)	N/A	Loan	Summer	
22	GK	(Iran)	Mohammad Rashid Mazaheri	24	Zob Ahan	Free	Transfer	Summer	
40	FW	(Iran)	Farzad Hatami	28	Persepolis	$500,000	Transfer	Winter	
3	DF	(Brazil)	Serjão	28	Released	Free	Transfer	Winter	

== Pre-season and friendlies ==
Date	Opponents	H / A	Result F–A	Scorers	Attendance
12 June 2013	Foolad Novin	A	5–2	Rahmani (2) 5', 7', Chimba (3) 22', 56', 60	2,000
20 June 2013	Foolad Yazd	N	1–0	Chimba 84'	5,000
12 July 2013	Naft Tehran	A	3–2	Chimba 11', Kalantari 22', Sharifat 89'	1,000
14 July 2013	Persepolis	N	2–1	Nouri 17' (o.g.), Sharifat 55'	4,000
20 July 2013	Bursaspor	H	1–0	Chimba 26'	6,000
15 December 2013	Padideh	N	3–0	Rahmani 12', Chaves 52', Rafiei 77'	2,000
18 December 2013	Saba	N	0–0		500

== Competition record ==
=== Overall ===
Competition	Record							
Competition	G	W	D	L	GF	GA	GD	Win %
Iran Pro League	30	16	9	5	36	24	+12	53.33
Hazfi Cup	4	3	0	1	8	2	+6	75.00
Champions League	8	4	4	0	13	5	+8	50.00
Total	42	23	13	6	45	31	+14	54.76

=== Iran Pro League ===
Date	Opponents	H / A	Result F–A	Scorers	Attendance	League position
25 July 2013	Sepahan	A	0–2		15,777	15th
2 August 2013	Fajr Sepasi	H	1–0	Hatami 64'	13,230	8th
6 August 2013	Saba Qom	A	1–0	Karami 49'	11,453	4th
10 August 2013	Damash Gilan	H	3–1	Chimba (2) 26', 46', Rahmani 53'	11,789	1st
16 August 2013	Rah Ahan	A	1–0	Chimba 48' (pen.)	1,145	1st
23 August 2013	Esteghlal Khuzestan	H	3–2	Hatami 28', Rahmani 34', Rafiei 83'	20,369	1st
30 August 2013	Persepolis	A	1–3	Sharifat 90+4'	60,852	1st
5 September 2013	Zob Ahan	H	1–0	Rahmani 38'	18,158	1st
13 September 2013	Mes Kerman	A	2–2	Chimba 31', Rafiei 88'	13,951	1st
20 September 2013	Saipa	H	4–1	Chimba 45' (pen.), Rahmani 55', Sharifat 66', Rafiei 72'	22,357	1st
27 September 2013	Malavan	A	2–1	Nouri 55', Chimba 79'	12,458	1st
27 September 2013	Naft Tehran	H	0–2		16,200	1st
18 October 2013	Tractor Sazi	A	2–2	Chimba 37' (pen.), Sharifat 66'	45,452	1st
25 October 2013	Esteghlal	A	0–2		35,985	2nd
3 November 2013	Gostaresh	H	1–1	Chaves 60'	13,869	3rd
29 November 2013	Sepahan	H	0–0		27,185	4th
5 December 2013	Fajr Sepasi	A	0–0		2,037	5th
13 December 2013	Saba Qom	H	2–0	Rahmani 28', Khaledi (90+4)	30,950	5th
20 December 2013	Damash Gilan	A	2–1	Chimba (2) 45', 48'	3,782	4th
24 December 2013	Rah Ahan	H	0–0		12,350	4th
3 January 2014	Esteghlal Khuzestan	A	2–0	Sharifat (2) 33', 90+1	40,140	3rd
11 January 2014	Persepolis	H	2–1	Sharifat 34', Afshin 89'	49,740	2nd
16 January 2014	Zob Ahan	A	0–0		3,356	2nd
26 January 2014	Mes Kerman	H	1–0	Vali 47'	22,144	2nd
31 January 2014	Saipa	A	0–0		1,980	2nd
9 February 2014	Malavan	H	1–0	Jamaati 89'	23,335	2nd
16 February 2014	Naft Tehran	A	1–1	Afshin 13'	1,780	1st
27 March 2014	Tractor Sazi	H	2–1	Badrlou 33' (pen.), 73' (pen.)	25,115	1st
6 April 2014	Esteghlal	H	0–1		50,205	2nd
11 April 2014	Gostaresh	A	1–0	Jamaati 37'	15,253	1st

Pos	Team	Pld	W	D	L	GF	GA	GD	Pts	Qualification or relegation
1	Foolad (C)	30	16	9	5	36	24	+12	57	Qualification for the 2015 AFC Champions League group stage
2	Persepolis	30	16	8	6	34	15	+19	55 (Note: Esteghlal, Malavan, Damash, Persepolis and Tractor Sazi were deducted 1 point due to poor fan behavior in their home matches.)	Qualification for the 2015 AFC Champions League group stage
3	Naft Tehran	30	15	9	6	39	23	+16	54	Qualification for the 2015 AFC Champions League qualifying play-off
4	Sepahan	30	14	12	4	36	20	+16	54	
5	Esteghlal	30	15	9	6	34	25	+9	53	

Updated to match(es) played on 11 April 2014. Source: FIFA.com
Rules for classification: 1) points; 2) goal difference; 3) number of goals scored.
(C) Champions

=== Hazfi Cup ===
Date	Round	Opponents	H / A	Result F–A	Scorers	Attendance
29 October 2013	Round 5	Foolad Yazd	H	3–0 (w/o)		N/A
8 November 2013	Round of 16	Foolad Novin	H	3–0 (w/o)		N/A
26 January 2014	Quarter-final	Persepolis	H	1–1 (a.e.t.) (3–0p)	Rahmani 57'	49,122
4 February 2014	Semi-final	Tractor Sazi	A	1–0		30,270

=== AFC Champions League ===
==== Group stage ====
Date	Opponents	H / A	Result F–A	Scorers	Attendance	Group position
25 February 2014	El Jaish	A	0–0		5,417	1st
11 March 2014	Al-Fateh	H	1–0	Rahmani 68' (pen.)	37,391	2nd
19 March 2014	Bunyodkor	A	1–1	Karami 74'	1,950	1st
1 April 2014	Bunyodkor	H	1–0	Vali 77'	24,175	2nd
15 April 2014	El Jaish	H	3–1	Rahmani 21', Rezaei 45+1', Chimba 90'	38,452	1st
23 April 2014	Al-Fateh	A	5–1	Chimba (3) 10', 36' (pen.), 44' (pen.), Rezaei (2) 79', 90+4' (pen.)	300	1st

Pos	Team	Pld	W	D	L	GF	GA	GD	Pts	Qualification	FLD	BUN	JSH	FAT
1	(Iran) Foolad	6	4	2	0	11	3	+8	14	Advance to knockout stage	—	1–0	3–1	1–0
2	(Uzbekistan) Bunyodkor	6	2	2	2	7	7	0	8 (Note: Tiebreakers: Bunyodkor and El-Jaish are tied on head-to-head record and overall goal difference, and so are ranked on overall goals scored.)	Advance to knockout stage	1–1	—	1–2	3–2
3	(Qatar) El Jaish	6	2	2	2	6	6	0	8		0–0	1–2	—	2–0
4	(Saudi Arabia) Al-Fateh	6	0	2	4	3	11	−8	2		1–5	0–0	0–0	—

==== Knockout phase ====
Date	Round	Opponents	H / A	Result F–A	Scorers	Attendance
7 May 2014	Round of 16; First leg	Al-Sadd	A	0–0		6,320
14 May 2014	Round of 16; Second leg	Al-Sadd	H	2–2	Chimba (2) 77' (pen.), 87'	48,753

Note: Al-Sadd won 2–2 on away goals.

== Statistics ==
=== Top scorers ===
Place	Position	Nationality	Number	Name	Iran Pro League	Hazfi Cup	AFC Champions League	Total
1	FW	(Brazil)	29	Chimba	9	0	6	15
2	MF	(Iran)	11	Bakhtiar Rahmani	5	1	2	8
3	FW	(Iran)	8	Esmaeil Sharifat	6	0	0	6
4	FW	(Iran)	37	Gholamreza Rezaei	0	0	3	3
4	FW	(Iran)	7	Soroush Rafiei	3	0	0	3
6	DF	(Iran)	24	Mehrdad Jamaati	2	0	0	2
6	FW	(Iran)	16	Arash Afshin	2	0	0	2
6	MF	(Iran)	7	Mehdi Badrlou	2	0	0	2
6	FW	(Iran)	40	Farzad Hatami	2	0	0	2
6	DF	(Iran)	10	Abdullah Karami	1	0	1	2
6	DF	(Iran)	4	Ayub Vali	1	0	1	2
12	DF	(Iran)	6	Mehdi Noori	1	0	0	1
12	MF	(Brazil)	15	Leandro Chaves	1	0	0	1
12	DF	(Iran)	21	Omid Khaledi	1	0	0	1
TOTALS					36	1	11	48
