= 2014–15 Foolad F.C. season =

Foolad
2014–15 season
- Chairman: Seifollah Dehkordi
- Manager: Dragan Skočić
- Stadium: Ghadir Stadium
- Iran Pro League: 3rd
- Hazfi Cup: Round 1
- ACL: Group Stage
- Top goalscorer: League: Soroush Rafiei (7 goals); All: Soroush Rafiei (7 goals)
- Highest home attendance: 37,843 (25 February 2015 against Al Sadd (ACL))
- Lowest home attendance: 1,000 (11 September 2014 against Saba Qom)
- Average home league attendance: League: 5,600; All: 8,545
Home colours	Away colours	Third colours

The 2014–15 season are Foolad's 13th season in the Persian Gulf Pro League. They competed in the Hazfi Cup which they were eliminated by Parseh Tehran in Round 5. They also will competing at AFC Champions League. Foolad is captained by Bakhtiar Rahmani.

== Players ==
Last updated on 21 April 2015

Under-23 players	Under-21 players

Out during the season (injured/ transferred)

No.	Name	Nationality	Position	Since	Date of birth (age)	Signed from
Goalkeepers
1	Alireza Salimi	(Iran)	GK	2010	23 February 1984 (age 42)	Tarbiat Yazd
22	Behnam Mousavi	(Iran)	GK	2014	5 May 1993 (age 33)	Youth system
31	Milad Homayouni	(Iran)	GK	2012	27 March 1993 (age 33)	Youth system
Defenders
2	Ahmad Alenemeh	(Iran)	DF	2015	20 October 1982 (age 44)	Tractor Sazi
3	Leonard Mesarić	(Croatia)	DF	2014	10 August 1983 (age 43)	Lokomotiva, Croatia
4	Ayoub Vali	(Iran)	DF	2008	9 August 1987 (age 39)	Youth system
6	Mehdi Badrlou	(Iran)	DF	2014	10 February 1993 (age 33)	Youth system
15	Mathias Chago	(Cameroon)	DF	2012	13 March 1983 (age 43)	Lokomotiva, Croatia
19	Bahman Kamel	(Iran)	DF	2014	19 January 1986 (age 40)	Naft Tehran
25	Omid Khaledi	(Iran)	DF	2011	29 October 1988 (age 38)	Shahin Ahvaz
33	Mehrdad Jama'ati	(Iran)	DF	2009	7 October 1987 (age 39)	Youth system
25	Mohammad Ahle Shakhe	(Iran)	DF	2014	2 July 1993 (age 33)	Youth system
33	Soroush Saeidi	(Iran)	DF	2014	2 July 1991 (age 35)	Youth system
Midfielders
5	Mehdi Badrlou	(Iran)	AM	2013	14 January 1986 (age 40)	Saba Qom
7	Soroush Rafiei	(Iran)	MF	2011	24 March 1990 (age 36)	Fajr Sepasi
10	Esmaeil Sharifat	(Iran)	MF	2012	6 June 1988 (age 38)	Esteghlal
11	Bakhtiar Rahmani(captain)	(Iran)	MF	2007	23 October 1989 (age 37)	Youth system
14	Shahab Karami	(Iran)	MF	2012	16 March 1991 (age 35)	Shahrdari Yasuj
29	Ali Sina Rabbani	(Iran)	MF	2009	16 January 1993 (age 33)	Youth system
32	Hadi Habibinejad	(Iran)	MF	2014	17 October 1995 (age 31)	Youth system
15	Yousef Vakia	(Iran)	MF	2012	30 September 1993 (age 33)	Youth system
Forwards
8	Sasan Ansari	(Iran)	FW	2010	4 May 1991 (age 35)	Youth system
9	Iman Mousavi	(Iran)	FW	2014	2 June 1989 (age 37)	Gostaresh
29	Jahantigh	(Iran)	FW	2014	14 March 1995 (age 31)	Youth system
30	Aloys Nong	(Cameroon)	FW	2014	16 October 1983 (age 43)	Levante Spain
77	Mohsen Mosalman	(Iran)	FW	2015	27 January 1991 (age 35)	Zob Ahan
99	Mohammad Ghazi	(Iran)	FW	2015	30 December 1984 (age 41)	Esteghlal

== Transfers ==
=== In ===
No	P	Nat	Name	Age	Moving from	Ends	Transfer fee	Type	Transfer window	Source
19	FW	(Iran)	Iman Mousavi	25	Gostaresh	2016	$230,000	Transfer	Summer	
15	MF	(Cameroon)	Mathias Chago	31	Lokomotiva Zagreb (Croatia)	2016	$305,000	Transfer	Summer	
19	DF	(Iran)	Bahman Kamel	28	Naft Tehran	2018	Free	Transfer	Summer	
3	DF	(Croatia)	Leonard Mesarić	30	Lokomotiva Zagreb (Croatia)	2015	$380,000	Transfer	Summer	
30	FW	(Cameroon)	Aloys Nong	31	Levante (Spain)	2016	$420,000	Transfer	Winter	
2	DF	(Iran)	Ahmad Alenemeh	32	Tractor Sazi	2017	$200,000	Transfer	Winter	
77	FW	(Iran)	Mohsen Mosalman	27	Zob Ahan	2016	$200,000	Loan	Winter	
99	FW	(Iran)	Mohammad Ghazi	30	Esteghlal	2017	$250,000	Transfer	Winter	

=== Out ===
No	P	Nat	Name	Age	Moving to	Transfer fee	Type	Transfer window	Source
9	FW	(Iran)	Abbas Mohammad Rezaei	31	Padideh	Free	Transfer	Summer	
10	MF	(Iran)	Abdollah Karami	31	Sepahan	$400,000	Transfer	Summer	
77	GK	(Iran)	Sosha Makani	27	Persepolis	$345,000	Transfer	Summer	
29	FW	(Brazil)	Chimba	30	Sepahan	$388,000	Transfer	Summer	
37	FW	(Iran)	Gholamreza Rezaei	30	Naft Tehran	$207,000	Transfer	Summer	

== Pre-season and friendlies ==
Date	Opponents	H / A	Result F–A	Scorers	Attendance
6 July 2014	Saba	N	2–2	Sharifat (2) 2', 74'	1,500
9 July 2014	Parseh Tehran	A	3–1	Chago 33', Sharifat 49', Rafiei 81'	1,000
15 July 2014	Admira Wacker	A	1–0	Mousavi 22'	5,000
17 July 2014	Metalurh Donetsk	N	0–0		3,000
19 July 2014	PEC Zwolle	N	0–1		3,000
25 July 2014	Zob Ahan	H	1–3	Rafiei 17'	12,000

== Competition record ==
=== Overall ===
Competition	Record							
Competition	G	W	D	L	GF	GA	GD	Win %
Iran Pro League	26	14	5	7	31	22	+9	53.85
Hazfi Cup	1	0	0	1	0	1	−1	0.00
Champions League	4	0	3	1	1	3	−2	0.00
Total	31	14	8	9	32	26	+6	45.16

=== Iran Pro League ===
==== Standings ====
Pos	Team	Pld	W	D	L	GF	GA	GD	Pts	Qualification or relegation
3	Naft Tehran	30	16	10	4	45	28	+17	58	Qualification for the 2016 AFC Champions League qualifying play-off
4	Zob Ahan	30	14	10	6	46	26	+20	52	Qualification for the 2016 AFC Champions League Group stage (Note: Zob Ahan secured qualification for the 2016 AFC Champions League through winning the 2014–15 Hazfi Cup.)
5	Foolad	30	15	7	8	33	24	+9	52	
6	Esteghlal	30	13	8	9	40	34	+6	47	
7	Saipa	30	11	8	11	36	34	+2	41	

Updated to match(es) played on 15 May 2015. Source: FIFA.com
Rules for classification: 1) points; 2) goal difference; 3) number of goals scored.

==== Results by round ====
Round	1	2	3	4	5	6	7	8	9	10	11	12	13	14	15	16	17	18	19	20	21	22	23	24	25	26	27	28	29	30
Ground	A	H	A	H	A	H	A	H	A	H	A	A	H	A	H	H	A	H	A	H	A	H	A	H	A	H	H	A	H	A
Result	L	W	W	W	D	D	L	W	W	D	L	W	W	D	L	W	W	W	W	L	L	D	L	W	W	W				
Position	13	6	3	2	4	5	5	4	3	3	4	3	2	3	4	4	4	2	1	4	5	5	5	5	5	4				

Source: "Ipl".
A = Away; H = Home; W = Win; D = Draw; L = Loss

==== Matches ====
Date	Opponents	H / A	Result F–A	Scorers	Attendance	League position
1 August 2014	Tractor Sazi	A	1–2	Mesarić 74'	43,500	13th
7 August 2014	Persepolis	H	2–0	Rafiei 45', Sharifat 53'	37,000	6th
14 August 2014	Rah Ahan	A	1–0	Rafiei 79'	2,000	3rd
19 August 2014	Esteghlal KHU	H	1–0	Vakia 1'	15,000	2nd
24 August 2014	Sepahan	A	1–1	Rafiei 74'	26,000	4th
29 August 2014	Saipa	H	0–0		25,000	5th
5 September 2014	Paykan	A	0–1		11,000	5th
11 September 2014	Gostaresh	H	1–0	Rafiei 90+4' pen	10,000	4th
19 September 2014	Esteghlal	A	1–0	Rafiei 84'	40,000	3rd
26 September 2014	Naft Tehran	H	2–2	Ansari 33', Sharifat 81'	22,000	3rd
3 October 2014	Naft M.S.	A	1–2	Rafiei 34'	7,000	4th
23 October 2014	Zob Ahan	A	1–0	Ansari 73'	11,000	3rd
30 October 2014	Malavan	H	1–0	Rafiei 90'	15,000	2nd
7 November 2014	Padideh	A	0–0		36,000	3rd
22 November 2014	Saba Qom	H	0–1		9,000	4th
2 December 2014	Tractor Sazi	H	3–2	Jamaati 13' 60', Nong 34'	45,000	4th
11 December 2014	Persepolis	A	2–1	Bengar 1' (o.g.) 1', Nong 72'		4th
30 January 2015	Rah Ahan	H	2–0	Alenemeh 71', Ghazi 83'	3,000	2nd
6 February 2015	Esteghlal KHU	A	0–3	Badrlou 8', Nong 28' 82'	15,000	1st
13 February 2015	Sepahan	H	0–1		7,000	4th
19 February 2015	Saipa	A	1–3	Nong 74'	1,000	5th
8 March 2015	Paykan	H	0–0		3,000	5th
12 March 2015	Gostaresh	A	1–3	Ghazi 73'	1,000	5th
3 April 2015	Esteghlal	H	2–1	Sharifat 71', Chago 82'	20,000	5th
12 April 2015	Naft Tehran	A	1–0	Nong 77'	2,000	5th
16 April 2015	Naft M.S.	H	3–2	Nong 5' 79', Ghazi 10'	5,000	4th
26 April 2015	Zob Ahan	H	-	0-2		
1 May 2015	Malavan	A	–	0-0		
11 May 2015	Padideh	H	–	0-0		
15 May 2015	Saba Qom	A	–	2-0		

=== Hazfi Cup ===
Date	Round	Opponents	H / A	Result F–A	Scorers	Attendance
17 October 2014	Round 5	Parseh Tehran	A	0–1		7,000

=== AFC Champions League ===
==== Group stage ====
Pos	Team	Pld	W	D	L	GF	GA	GD	Pts	Qualification	HIL	SAD	FOO	LOK
1	(Saudi Arabia) Al-Hilal	6	4	1	1	9	4	+5	13	Advance to knockout stage	—	2–1	2–0	3–1
2	(Qatar) Al-Sadd	6	3	1	2	9	9	0	10	Advance to knockout stage	1–0	—	1–0	6–2
3	(Iran) Foolad	6	1	3	2	2	4	−2	6		0–0	0–0	—	1–0
4	(Uzbekistan) Lokomotiv Tashkent	6	1	1	4	10	13	−3	4		1–2	5–0	1–1	—

Source: AFC
Rules for classification: Group stage tiebreakers

Date Round	Home	Score	Away	Location

25 February 2015 1	Foolad (Iran)	0-0	(Qatar) Al Sadd	Ghadir Stadium, Ahvaz
16:00 UTC+5	M. Badrlou (yellow card) 32' (yellow-red card); M. Mosalman (yellow card) 43'; A. Nong (yellow card) 65'; M. Chago (yellow card) 75'	Report	J. Yahia (yellow card) 42'	Attendance: 37,843; Referee: (South Korea) Kim Sang Woo; Man of the Match: Nadir Belhadj

4 March 2015 2	Lokomotiv (Uzbekistan)	1-1	(Iran) Foolad	Lokomotiv Stadium, Tashkent
13:30 UTC+5	O. Zoteev 6'; L.Turaev (yellow card) 16'; S. Mustafoev (yellow card) 75'	Report	M. Jama'ati 32'; Y. Vakia (yellow card) 79'	Attendance: 7,456; Referee: (Japan) Ryuji Sato; Man of the Match: Oleg Zoteev

17 March 2015 3	Foolad (Iran)	0-0	(Saudi Arabia) Al-Hilal	Ghadir Stadium, Ahvaz
16:00 UTC+5	M. Mosalman (yellow card) 38'; M. Ghazi (yellow card) 54'	Report	S. Al-Faraj (yellow card) 12'; S. Kariri (yellow card) 64'	Attendance: 37.452; Referee: (Australia) Jarred Gillett; Man of the Match: Mehrdad Jama'ati

8 April 2015 4	Al-Hilal (Saudi Arabia)	2–0	(Iran) Foolad	King Fahd International Stadium, Riyadh
20:45 UTC+3	Al-Shamrani 46'; Al-Shahrani 61'	Report		Attendance: 20,087; Referee: Masaaki Toma (Japan)

21 April 2015 5	Al-Sadd (Qatar)	v	(Iran) Foolad	Jassim Bin Hamad Stadium, Doha
19:00 UTC+3		Report

5 May 2015 6	Foolad (Iran)	v	(Uzbekistan) Lokomotiv Tashkent	Ghadir Stadium, Ahvaz
20:35 UTC+4:30		Report

== Statistics ==
=== Top scorers ===
Place	Position	Nationality	Number	Name	Iran Pro League	Hazfi Cup	AFC Champions League	Total
1	FW	(Brazil)	30	Aloys Nong	8	0	0	8
2	MF	(Iran)	7	Soroush Rafiei	7	0	0	7
3	MF	(Iran)	10	Esmaeil Sharifat	3	0	0	3
3	FW	(Iran)	99	Mohammad Ghazi	3	0	0	3
3	FW	(Iran)	23	Mehrdad Jama'ati	2	0	1	3
6	FW	(Iran)	8	Sasan Ansari	2	0	0	2
7	DF	(Iran)	6	Mehdi Badrlou	1	0	0	1
7	MF	(Iran)	40	Yousef Vakia	1	0	0	1
7	DF	(Cameroon)	15	Mathias Chago	1	0	0	1
7	DF	(Croatia)	3	Leonard Mesarić	1	0	0	1
7	DF	(Iran)	2	Ahmad Alenemeh	1	0	0	1
Own goal					1	0	0	1
TOTALS					31	0	1	32
