= Foolad Youth Academy =

Foolad فولاد
- Full name: Foolad Khuzestan Football Club
- Nickname(s): Foolad Mardan (Men of Steel)
- Founded: 2000; 14 years ago
- Ground: Foolad Khuzestan Stadium
- Capacity: 5,000
- Owner: Foolad Khuzestan Company
- Chairman: (Iran) Seifollah Dehkordi
- Technical Director: (Croatia) Nenad Nikolic
- Website: http://fooladfc.com/
Home colours	Away colours	Third colours

Foolad Youth Academy was established in 2000 by the Foolad Khuzestan Football Club to help grow the football talent in the province of Khuzestan, in Iran. Foolad has over 400 players and 34 coaches through is different youth ranks. The academy has been extremely successful and has been noted as the country's best academy producing players such as Iman Mobali, Arash Afshin, Bakhtiar Rahmani, and Kaveh Rezaei.

Foolad has active teams in all youth levels. The clubs heavy investment into the youth academy ensures that the majority of the players graduate to become professional footballers in Iran.

== Results ==
In the 2009-10 season the under-14 team became champions of Iran, the under-16 finished runners up, and the u-18 and u-21 teams finished third. Foolad was the only club in Iran to field teams in all four youth levels and they were also the number one producer of players getting selected to different national team levels.

== Notable players ==
Here are the most notable graduates from Foolad's Youth Academy:

- Jalal Kameli-Mofrad
- Ahmad Alenemeh
- Mohammad Alavi
- Pejman Montazeri
- Milad Zeneyedpour
- Esmaeil Sharifat
- Bakhtiar Rahmani
- Mehrdad Jama'ati
- Kaveh Rezaei
- Arash Afshin
- Sasan Ansari
