= Abdollah Nasseri =

Iranian footballer

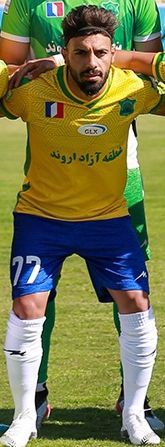

Personal information
- Date of birth: 20 May 1992 (age 34)
- Place of birth: Ahvaz, Iran
- Height: 1.74 m (5 ft 9 in)
- Position: Right-back

Team information
- Current team: Navad Urmia
- Number: 2

Senior career*
Years	Team	Apps	(Gls)
2014–2015	Foolad B	22	(1)
2015–2018	Foolad	60	(4)
2018–2019	Saipa	21	(1)
2019–2021	Sanat Naft	51	(1)
2021–2022	Tractor	24	(0)
2023	Saipa	3	(0)
2024–2025	Foolad B	1	(0)
2025–	Navad Urmia	7	(1)
- * Club domestic league appearances and goals as of 12 April 2025

Abdollah Nasseri (Persian: عبدالله ناصری; born 20 May 1992) is an Iranian football defender who plays for Navad Urmia in League 2.

== Club career ==
=== Foolad ===
Nasseri was a main player in Foolad Novin in 2014–15 Azadegan League. In summer 2015 he promoted to Foolad and signed contract until 2018. He made his debut for Foolad on 18 December 2015 against Gostaresh Foolad as a starter.

== Club career statistics ==
As of 18 December 2015.

Club	Division	Season	League		Hazfi Cup		Asia		Total	
Club	Division	Season	Apps	Goals	Apps	Goals	Apps	Goals	Apps	Goals
Foolad Novin	Division 1	2014–15	21	1	3	0	–	–	24	1
Foolad	Pro League	2015–16	12	0	0	0	–	–	12	0
Career totals			33	1	3	0	0	0	36	1
