= Foolad Khuzestan Stadium =

Football stadium in Ahvaz, Iran

Coordinates: 31.2793°N 48.7797°E

Foolad Arena
- Interactive map of Foolad Arena
- Full name: Foolad Arena
- Location: Ahvaz, Iran
- Owner: Foolad Khuzestan Company
- Operator: Foolad
- Capacity: 30,556
- Surface: Grass

Construction
- Opened: 2007

Tenants
- Foolad Novin (2008– ) Foolad Youth Academy (2007–)

Foolad Arena is a football stadium in Ahvaz, Iran which hosts the Foolad Youth Academy and Foolad Novin, the clubs B team. The stadium was inaugurated in 2007.
