= Leandro Padovani =

Brazilian footballer

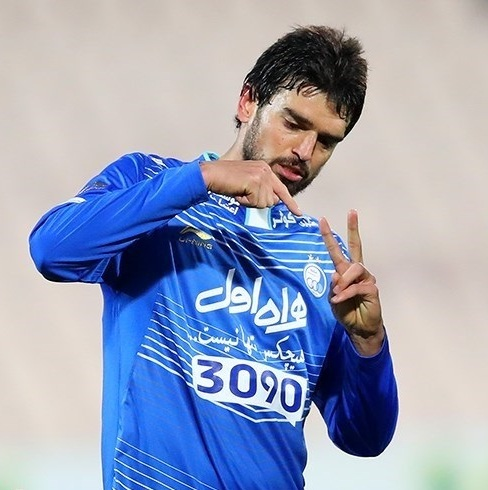
- Padovani with Esteghlal in 2017

Personal information
- Full name: Leandro Padovani Celin
- Date of birth: 21 December 1983 (age 42)
- Place of birth: Castelo, Espírito Santo, Brazil
- Height: 1.97 m (6 ft 6 in)
- Position: Centre back

Youth career
- 2001–2002: Brasiliense

Senior career*
Years	Team	Apps	(Gls)
2002–2003	Gama		
2003–2011	Brasiliense	4	(0)
2008	→ Bahia (loan)		
2008–2009	→ Hatta Club (loan)		
2011	Volta Redonda	10	(0)
2012	Guaratinguetá	5	(0)
2012–2014	Foolad	23	(2)
2013	→ Al Rayyan (loan)	5	(2)
2014–2015	Naft Tehran	27	(7)
2015–2016	Sepahan	9	(0)
2016–2018	Esteghlal	27	(1)
- * Club domestic league appearances and goals

Leandro Padovani Celin (born 21 December 1983) is a retired Brazilian football defender.

== Club career ==
Padovani has spent the majority of his career in Brazil. In 2012, he transferred to Foolad in the Iranian Premier League where he won the title in 2013–14 season. In July 2014 Padovani signed with Naft Tehran.

=== Sepahan ===
He signed a contract with Iranian champions Sepahan in the summer of 2015, due to ITC issues he could not play until winter 2016. He made his debut on 2 February 2016 in a 2–2 draw against Persepolis.

=== Esteghlal ===
On 5 September 2016 he signed with Esteghlal. He started his first match against F.C. Mashhad on 15 November.

In March 2018 during a league match against Foolad he injured severely after an accidental encounter with his teammate Armin Sohrabian causing him to break his skull and neck. He got discharged from the hospital two month later on a wheelchair to start his physiotherapy and other treatments while staying at home. In November, Esteghlal's chairman Amir Hossein Fathi announced that Padovani would retire from playing football and will go to Brazil for his further treatments after being unable to fully walk during his 9-month period of physiotherapy. He also added that he would come back to Iran after his treatments to start his job, as club's assistant coach.

His doctor later reported that Padovani had lost the ability to walk forever and was paralyzed from the waist down.

== Career statistics ==
Appearances and goals by club, season and competition
Club	Division	Season	League		Cup		Asia		Other		Total	
Club	Division	Season	Apps	Goals	Apps	Goals	Apps	Goals	Apps	Goals	Apps	Goals
Foolad	2012–13	Iran Pro League	18	2	0	0	0	0	—		18	2
Foolad	2013–14	Iran Pro League	5	0	1	0	6	0	—		12	0
Foolad	Total		23	2	1	0	6	0	—		30	2
Naft Tehran	2014–15	Iran Pro League	28	7	4	1	9	2	—		41	10
Sepahan	2015–16	Iran Pro League	9	0	0	0	6	0	—		15	0
Esteghlal	2016–17	Iran Pro League	21	1	3	0	9	1	—		33	2
Esteghlal	2017–18	Iran Pro League	6	0	2	0	0	0	—		8	0
Esteghlal	Total		27	1	5	0	9	1	—		41	2
Career total			87	10	10	1	30	3	0	0	127	14

== Honours ==
=== Club ===
Foolad

- Iran Pro League (1): 2013–14

Esteghlal

- Hazfi Cup (1): 2017–18

=== Individual ===
- Iran Pro League Team of the Year: 2014–15
