= Leandro Chaves =

Brazilian footballer

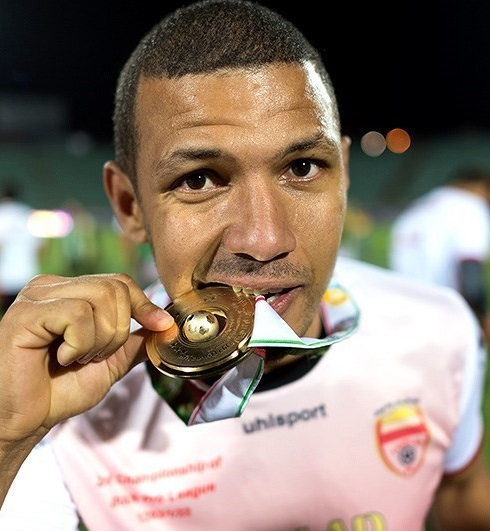

Personal information
- Full name: Leonardo Chaves Rodrigues
- Date of birth: 4 October 1983 (age 43)
- Place of birth: Duque de Caxias, Brazil
- Height: 1.77 m (5 ft 10 in)
- Position: Midfielder

Youth career
- Marília

Senior career*
Years	Team	Apps	(Gls)
2004	Marília		
2004–2006	La Paz		
2006	America RJ		
2006	Náutico		
2007	Ituano		
2007	America RJ		
2007	Gama		
2007–2008	Rizespor	29	(3)
2008–2009	Ankaragücü	3	(0)
2009–2010	Tigres do Brasil	0	(0)
2009	→ Duque de Caxias (loan)	23	(4)
2010	→ Betim (loan)	3	(0)
2010	Duque de Caxias	28	(3)
2011	Boavista	0	(0)
2011	Figueirense	4	(0)
2011–2012	Ceara	21	(2)
2013	Boavista	0	(0)
2013–2014	Foolad	20	(1)
2014	América		
2015	Brasiliense		
2015–2016	Madureira	14	(3)
2016	Nacional de Manaus	4	(0)
2017	Bangu	0	(0)
2017	Audax Rio		
2018	Bonsucesso	0	(0)
2018	Olaria		
2019	Potiguar	7	(0)
- * Club domestic league appearances and goals

Leandro Chaves Rodrigues (born 4 October 1983), better known as Leandro Chaves, is a Brazilian former footballer who played as a midfielder.

== Career ==
Chaves was born in Duque de Caxias and played football for America Football Club, appearing for the club in the 2007 Copa do Brasil. In the summer of 2013 Chaves signed with Iran Pro League club Foolad. In his first and only season with Foolad, Chaves helped the club win the Iran Pro League title for the second time in the club's history.
