= Reza Ahmadi =

Iranian footballer

Personal information
- Full name: Reza Ahmadi
- Date of birth: February 10, 1993 (age 33)
- Place of birth: Dezful, Iran
- Position: Defender

Team information
- Current team: Foolad
- Number: 27

Youth career
- 2011–2014: Foolad

Senior career*
Years	Team	Apps	(Gls)
2014–	Foolad	5	(0)
- * Club domestic league appearances and goals as of 15 May 2015

Reza Ahmadi (Persian: رضا احمدی) is an Iranian football defender who plays for Foolad in the Iran Pro League.

== Club career ==
=== Foolad ===
He started his career with Foolad from youth levels. Later he joined to first team by Dragan Skočić and signed a three-year contract which kept him at Foolad until 2017. He made his debut for Foolad in the 2nd fixture of the 2014–15 Iran Pro League against Persepolis as a substitute for Soroush Rafiei.

== Club career statistics ==
As of 15 May 2015.

Club	Division	Season	League		Hazfi Cup		Asia		Total	
Club	Division	Season	Apps	Goals	Apps	Goals	Apps	Goals	Apps	Goals
Foolad	Pro League	2014–15	5	0	0	0	3	0	8	0
Career Totals			5	0	0	0	3	0	8	0
