= Bahman Kamel =

Iranian footballer

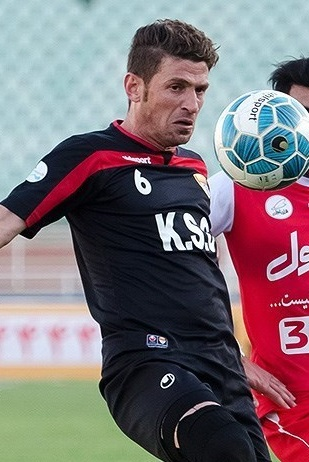

Personal information
- Full name: Bahman Kamel
- Date of birth: January 19, 1986 (age 40)
- Place of birth: Tabriz, Iran
- Height: 1.74 m (5 ft 8 1/2 in)
- Position: Defender

Team information
- Current team: Oxin Alborz

Senior career*
Years	Team	Apps	(Gls)
2008–2012	Machine Sazi		
2012–2014	Naft Tehran	34	(0)
2014–2016	Foolad	41	(0)
2016–2017	Machine Sazi	19	(0)
2017–2018	Oxin Alborz	0	(0)
- * Club domestic league appearances and goals as of 3 August 2016

Bahman Kamel (Persian: بهمن کامل); is an Iranian football defender who plays for Oxin in the Azadegan League.

== Club career ==
=== Machine Sazi ===
He joined Machine Sazi in the summer of 2008 and spent four seasons with Tabrizi side in Division 1 and Division 2.

=== Naft Tehran ===
He joined Naft Tehran in the summer of 2012. He spent two seasons in Naft Tehran and made 35 appearances without scoring.

=== Foolad ===
After two seasons at Naft, he signed a one-year contract with Iranian League title holder, Foolad at the deadline of the summer transfer window. He made his debut for Foolad in the second fixture of the 2014–15 Iran Pro League against Persepolis as a substitute for Yousef Vakia.

== Club career statistics ==
As of 12 June 2016.

Club	Division	Season	League		Hazfi Cup		Asia		Total	
Club	Division	Season	Apps	Goals	Apps	Goals	Apps	Goals	Apps	Goals
Naft Tehran	Pro League	2012–13	24	0	1	0	–	–	25	0
Naft Tehran	Pro League	2013–14	11	0	1	0	–	–	12	0
Foolad	Pro League	2014–15	15	0	1	0	5	0	21	0
Foolad	Pro League	2015–16	28	0	1	0	0	0	29	0
Career Totals			78	0	4	0	5	0	87	0
