= Iraj Arab =

Iranian sports executive

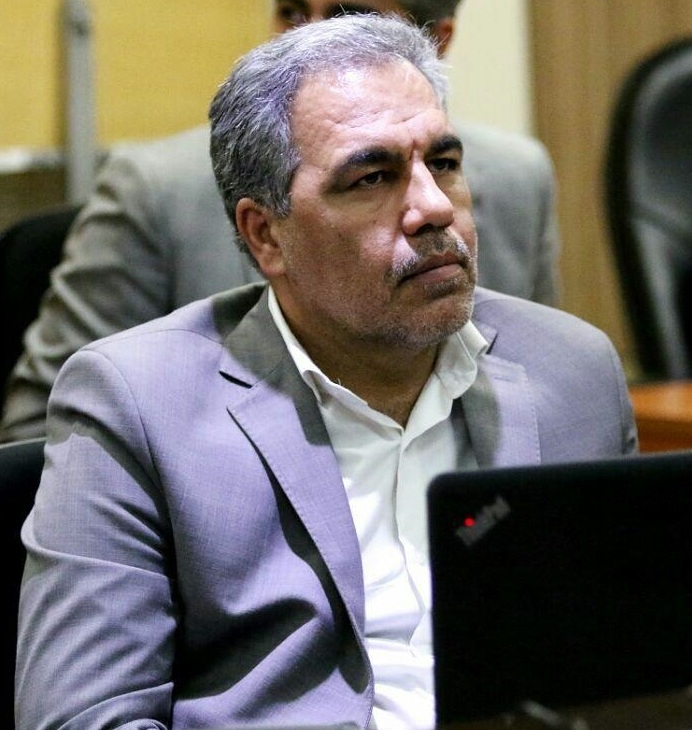
- Arab in 2018
- Title: President of Persepolis F.C.
- Term: 11 December 2018–27 August 2019
- Predecessor: Hamidreza Garshasbi
- Successor: Mohammad Hassan Ansarifard

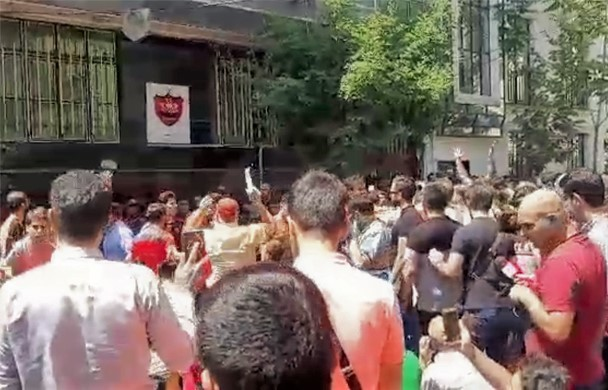
Persepolis supporters protests against Iraj Arab and managing board, caused by possibility of ending cooperation with Branko Ivanković.

Iraj Arab (Persian: ایرج عرب) is an Iranian sports executive and administrator who has been serving as president of the Persepolis Football Club. Arab was previously working as deputy chief of the Persepolis administrative and financial affairs, In December 2018, he replaced HamidReza Garshasbi.

On 18 June 2019, Persepolis supporters protests against Iraj Arab and managing board, Because of possibility of ending cooperation with Branko Ivanković.

| Preceded by Hamidreza Garshasbi | Persepolis F.C. chairman 2018–2019 | Succeeded by Mohammad Hassan Ansarifard |
