= Ghasem Latifi =

Iranian football player

Personal information
- Full name: Ghasem Latifi
- Date of birth: 27 March 2004 (age 22)
- Place of birth: Shush, Iran
- Height: 1.75 m (5 ft 9 in)
- Position: Midfielder

Team information
- Current team: Foolad
- Number: 29

Youth career
- Foolad

Senior career*
Years	Team	Apps	(Gls)
2024–	Foolad	7	(0)
2025–2026	→ Esteghlal Khuzestan (loan)	22	(1)

International career
2025–	Iran U-23	0	(0)
- * Club domestic league appearances and goals as of 24 August 2026

Ghasem Latifi (Persian: قاسم لطیفی; born 27 March 2004) is an Iranian professional footballer who plays as a midfielder for Foolad in the Persian Gulf Pro League.

== Club career ==
Latifi is a product of the Foolad Academy and spent more than 10 years in Foolad's youth ranks, winning a championship and a runners-up medal in the country's top youth leagues. As captain of the Foolad U-23 team, he recorded 5 goals and 4 assists in 18 matches.

Latifi began his professional career with Foolad and joined the club's senior squad for the 2024 season in the Persian Gulf Pro League. He was loaned to Esteghlal Khuzestan, where he made a total of 22 official appearances in league and cup competitions by the end of 2025, scoring 1 goal. His first professional goal in the Persian Gulf Pro League came against Mes Rafsanjan, giving Esteghlal Khuzestan a 1–0 victory.

== International career ==
In 2026, Hossein Abdi, head coach of the Iran U-23 national team, called up Ghasem Latifi along with Yousef Mazraeh and Abolfazl Mardi, two other Foolad players, to the national team.

== Career statistics ==
As of 24 August 2026

Club	Division	Season	League		Hazfi Cup		Asia		Total	
Club	Division	Season	Apps	Goals	Apps	Goals	Apps	Goals	Apps	Goals
Foolad	Persian Gulf Pro League	2024–25	0	0	0	0	–	–	0	0
Esteghlal Khuzestan (loan)	Persian Gulf Pro League	2025–26	22	1	0	0	–	–	22	1
Foolad	Persian Gulf Pro League	2026–27	3	0	0	0	–	–	3	0
Career total			25	1	0	0	–	–	25	1
