= Bakhtiar Rahmani =

Kurdish footballer

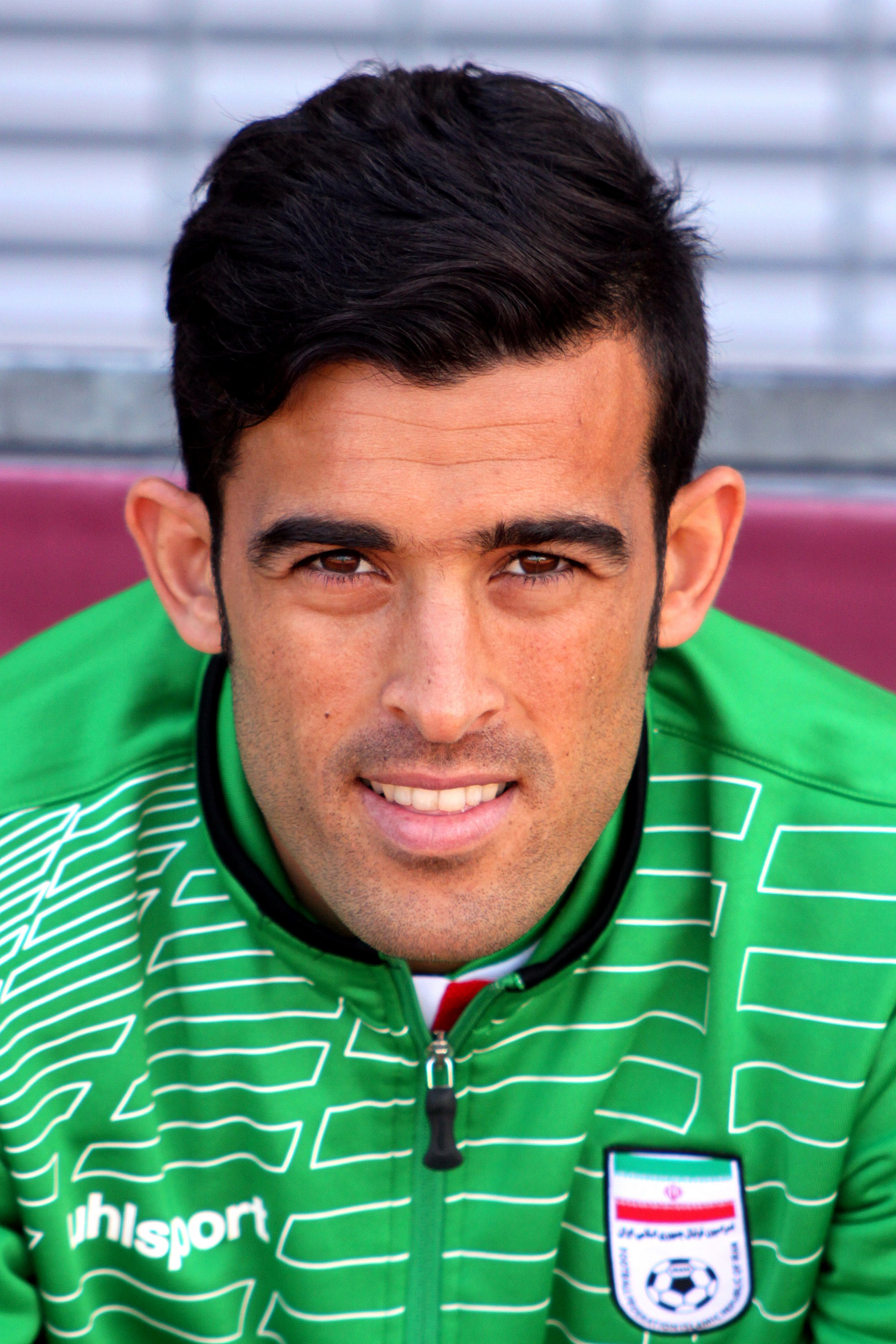
- Rahmani with Iran in 2014

Personal information
- Full name: Bakhtiar Rahmani
- Date of birth: 23 September 1991 (age 35)
- Place of birth: Sarpol-e Zahab, Iran
- Height: 1.78 m (5 ft 10 in)
- Position: Attacking midfielder

Team information
- Current team: SV Pars Neu-Isenburg
- Number: 5

Youth career
- 2005–2007: Foolad

Senior career*
Years	Team	Apps	(Gls)
2007–2016	Foolad	177	(25)
2015–2016	→ Tractor (loan)	28	(5)
2016–2017	Esteghlal	13	(0)
2017	Foolad	13	(2)
2017–2018	Paykan	12	(1)
2018	Zob Ahan	13	(1)
2018–2019	Sepahan	11	(0)
2019	Al-Shamal	2	(0)
2019–2020	Sanat Naft Abadan	8	(0)
2020–2021	Sabail	5	(0)
2021–2024	Dalkurd	38	(7)
2021	→ Duhok (loan)	7	(4)
2026–	SV Pars Neu-Isenburg	1	(0)

International career^{‡}
2004–2006	Iran U15	13	(5)
2006–2009	Iran U17	2	(2)
2009–2010	Iran U20	5	(4)
2011–2013	Iran U23	8	(2)
2013–2014	Iran	4	(0)
- * Club domestic league appearances and goals as of 17 November 2023 ‡ National team caps and goals as of 25 July 2016

Bakhtiar Rahmani (Persian: بختیار رحمانی; born 23 September 1991) is an Iranian Kurdish footballer who plays as a midfielder for SV Pars Neu-Isenburg.

== Early life ==
Rahmani was born in Sarpol-e Zahab.

== Club career ==
=== Foolad ===
Rahmani has played his entire career for Foolad. After the release of Jalal Kameli-Mofrad in the summer of 2012, he was chosen as the club captain by head coach Hossein Faraki, when he was just twenty years old and led the club to the fourth place. He renewed his contract with Foolad for another three years on 30 April 2013, keeping him at the club until 2016. Rahmani helped the club to win its second championship in the 2013–14 season, in which he scored five goals and assisted seven times in 28 matches.

=== Tractor ===
In the summer of 2015 Rahmani signed a two–year contract with Tractor to spend his conscription period at the club.

=== Esteghlal ===
On 3 June 2016, he joined Esteghlal on a two-year contract.

=== Zob Ahan ===
On 12 December 2017, he joined Zob Ahan.

== International career ==
Rahmani was first called up for the Iran national under-15 football team in 2004. He has played for the Iran national football team in all ranks. He was called up and played for the Iran national under-23 football team by Alireza Mansourian in 2011. He was also captain of the under-23 team.

On 14 May 2013, Rahmani was called up for the Iran national football team by coach Carlos Queiroz. He made his debut against Oman in a friendly match on 22 May 2013. On 1 June 2014, he was named in Iran's 2014 FIFA World Cup squad by Queiroz. However, he did not play for Team Melli in the tournament, as he was an unused substitute in three matches.

== Personal life ==
On 8 January 2026, Rahmani publicly supported the 2025–2026 Iranian protests, stating: "You cowardly and corrupt thieves have never seen the pain of these people. You have not heard their voices." He had also supported the Mahsa Amini protests.

== Statistics ==
=== Club career statistics ===
Last updated: 9 September 2019

Club performance			League		Cup		Continental		Total	
Season	Club	League	Apps	Goals	Apps	Goals	Apps	Goals	Apps	Goals
Iran			League		Hazfi Cup		Asia		Total	
2007–08	Foolad	Azadegan League	19	3	2	0	—		21	3
2008–09	Foolad	Persian Gulf Pro League	16	1	2	0	—		18	1
2009–10	Foolad	Persian Gulf Pro League	24	3	1	0	—		25	3
2010–11	Foolad	Persian Gulf Pro League	30	4	2	0	—		32	4
2011–12	Foolad	Persian Gulf Pro League	30	4	2	0	—		32	4
2012–13	Foolad	Persian Gulf Pro League	30	5	1	0	—		31	5
2013–14	Foolad	Persian Gulf Pro League	28	5	2	0	7	2	37	7
2014–15	Foolad	Persian Gulf Pro League	0	0	0	0	0	0	0	0
2015–16	Tractor	Persian Gulf Pro League	28	5	3	0	7	3	38	8
2016–17	Esteghlal	Persian Gulf Pro League	13	0	3	1	0	0	16	1
2016–17	Foolad	Persian Gulf Pro League	13	2	0	0	—		13	2
2017–18	Paykan	Persian Gulf Pro League	12	1	1	0	—		13	1
2017–18	Zob Ahan	Persian Gulf Pro League	13	1	0	0	9	0	22	1
2018–19	Sepahan	Persian Gulf Pro League	11	0	2	0	—		13	0
2019–20	Al-Shamal	Qatari Second Division	0	0	0	0	—		0	0
2019–20	Sanat Naft Abadan	Persian Gulf Pro League	8	0	0	0	—		0	0
Career total			275	34	21	1	23	5	319	40

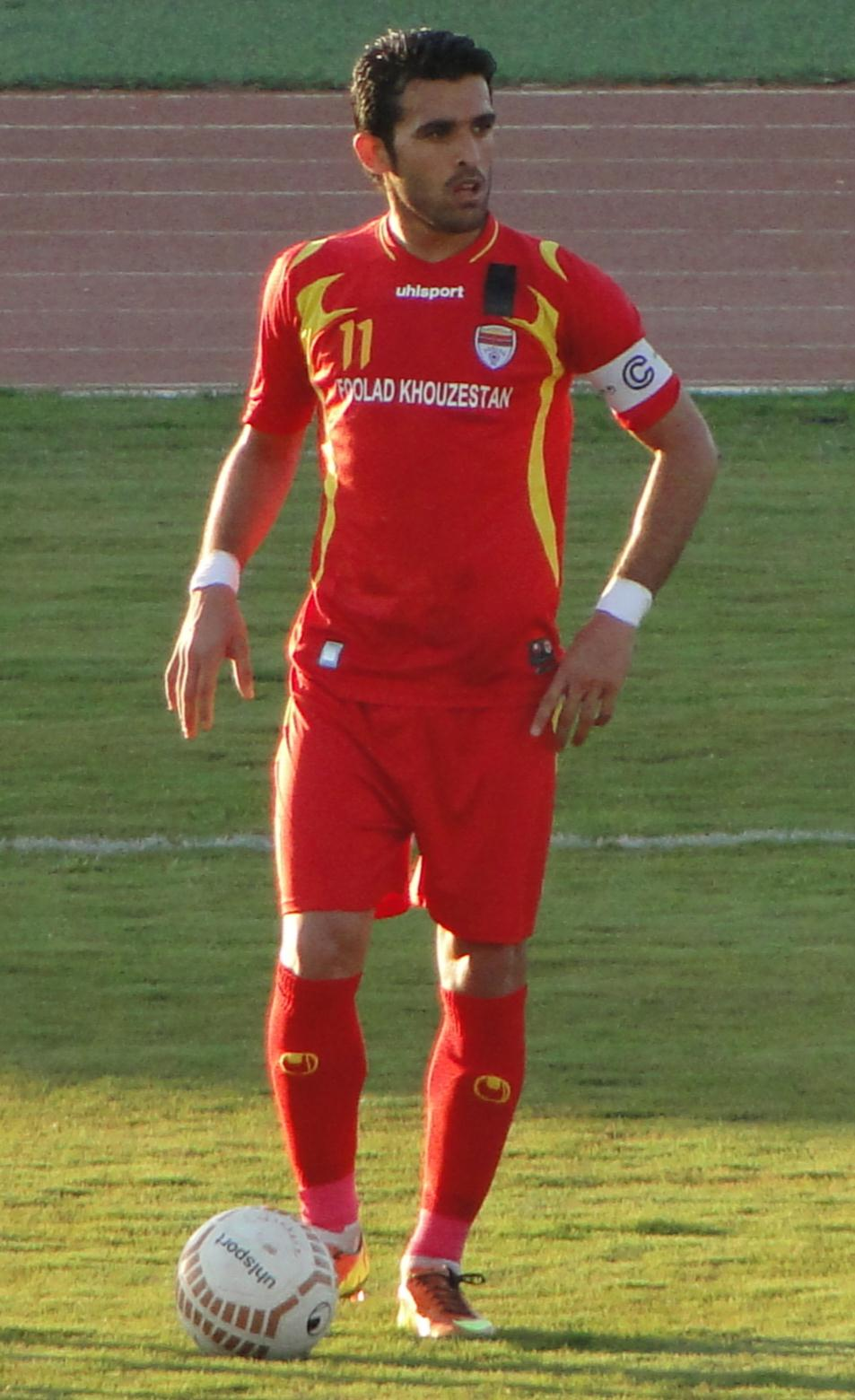
Rahmani captaining Foolad in a match against Paykan, 22 February 2013

- Assist goals

Season	Team	Assists
07–08	Foolad	4
08–09	Foolad	1
09–10	Foolad	15
10–11	Foolad	13
11–12	Foolad	9
12–13	Foolad	12
13–14	Foolad	8
14–15	Foolad	0
15–16	Tractor	4
16–17	Esteghlal	1
16–17	Foolad	1
17–18	Paykan	0
17–18	Zob Ahan	2
18–19	Sepahan	0

=== International goals ===
==== Under-20 ====
International U-20 goals
1	8 December 2009	Tehran, Iran	Pakistan	3–0	Win	2010 AFC U-19 Championship qualification
2	8 December 2009	Tehran, Iran	Pakistan	3–0	Win	2010 AFC U-19 Championship qualification
3	8 December 2009	Tehran, Iran	Pakistan	3–0	Win	2010 AFC U-19 Championship qualification
4	12 December 2009	Tehran, Iran	Uzbekistan	1–1	Draw	2010 AFC U-19 Championship qualification

==== Under-23 ====
International U-23 goals
1	23 February 2011	Tehran, Iran	Kyrgyzstan	1–0	Win	2012 Olympics qualifications
2	11 October 2011	Tehran, Iran	South Africa	1–2	Lose	Friendly

== Honours ==
Foolad

- Iran Pro League (1): 2013–14
