= Foolad Khuzestan B F.C. =

Foolad B فولاد ب
- Full name: Foolad Khuzestan B Football Club
- Founded: 2008; 10 years ago
- Ground: Foolad Khuzestan Stadium; Ahvaz; Iran
- Capacity: 5,000
- Chairman: Hamidreza Garshasbi
- Head Coach: Ayoub Vali
- League: Azadegan League
- 2025–26: League 2 (promoted)
Home colours	Away colours	Third colours

Foolad Khuzestan B Football Club (Persian: باشگاه فوتبال فولاد نوين خوزستان, Bashgah-e Futbal-e Fulâd-e Nevin Xuzestan) is an Iranian football club, based in Ahvaz, Khuzestan. They are the reserve side of Persian Gulf Pro League club Foolad, and currently compete in the Azadegan League. The club has a policy to only sign players from the province of Khuzestan, to promote the growth of local talent.

In the summer of 2015, Foolad Novin changed its name to Foolad Khuzestan B.

== History ==
=== Establishment ===
Foolad Novin was formed in 2008 with the aim of supporting feeder club Foolad. The relationship was built as a foundation for the development of football and coaching in Khuzestan province. The club started with the acquisition of Dayhim Ahvaz F.C. license, a club which played in the 2nd Division in 2008.

=== Promotion to Azadegan League ===
With players explicitly from Khuzestan province, the club started play in the 2nd Division, with good performances and results the club reached the second stage. Foolad continued with good performances and finished second in Group 1 and were promoted to the Azadegan League.

=== 2nd Division and Return ===
Foolad Novin started the next season in the Azadegan League poorly and were relegated back to the 2nd Division. After four years of playing in the 2nd Division with average results, Foolad Novin was again promoted back to the Azadegan League for the 2014-15 Azadegan League season. With good planning from the technical staff and the policy of signing talent of Foolad the team performed well and finished first. On 9 May 2015 Foolad Novin defeated Siah Jamegan 1–0 in the final of the Azadegan League to become champions of the league for the first time in their history.

The club sold their rights in the Persian Gulf Pro League to Esteghlal Ahvaz, because two teams from the same club can not play in the same league, Foolad was already in the top flight so Foolad Novin assumed Esteghlal's position in the 2nd Division.

== Season-by-season ==
The table below chronicles the achievements of Foolad Novin in various competitions since 2007.

Season	League	Position	Hazfi Cup	Notes
2008–09	2nd Division	2nd	Third Round	Promoted
2009–10	Azadegan League	13th	1/16 Final	Relegated
2010–11	2nd Division	7th/Group B	Did not qualify
2011–12	2nd Division	7th/Group A	Second Round
2012–13	2nd Division	3rd/Group A	Did not qualify
2013–14	2nd Division	2nd/Group A	1/8 Final	Promoted
2014–15	Azadegan League	1st/Group A		Replaced
2015–16	2nd Division	6th/Group D	Did not enter
2016–17	2nd Division		First Round

== Players ==
=== First-team squad ===
Note: Flags indicate national team as defined under FIFA eligibility rules; some limited exceptions apply. Players may hold more than one non-FIFA nationality.

No.	Pos.	Nation	Player
2	DF	IRN	Danial Saedi
3	DF	IRN	Ashkan Jalil Tahmasebi
4	DF	IRN	Aghil Kaabi
6	DF	IRN	Mehdi Berihi
7	FW	IRN	Mohammad Khademi
8	MF	IRN	Sajjad Tamimi
10	MF	IRN	Heydar Heydari
12	GK	IRN	Amir Hossein Khezri
14	MF	IRN	Mehdi Abdolkhani
16	MF	IRN	Soheil Tayebi
17	DF	IRN	Ebrahim Moradi
18	MF	IRN	Alireza Bavieh
19	MF	IRN	Ehsan Alvanzadeh
21	DF	IRN	Omid Khaledi (Captain)

No.	Pos.	Nation	Player
23	MF	IRN	Ali Satavi
24	DF	IRN	Abbas Alizadeh
30	GK	IRN	Meysam Rahimi
33	GK	IRN	Mohammad Behzadi
40	DF	IRN	Sajjad Ghazali
55	DF	IRN	Amir Hossein Jalali
60	MF	IRN	Reza Gareh
66	MF	IRN	Hossein Bahrami
82	GK	IRN	Amir Alipour
87	MF	IRN	Rasoul Zahisal
88	MF	IRN	Seyed Iman Seyedi
90	MF	IRN	Foad Koroushat
97	MF	IRN	Saeed Alivand
99	MF	IRN	Ramin Davoudi

== Honours ==
=== Domestic ===
- Azadegan League:
  - Winners (1): 2014–15

== See also ==
- 2013–14 Hazfi Cup
- 2013–14 Iran Football's 2nd Division
