= Khouzestan Steel Company =

Steel company of Iran

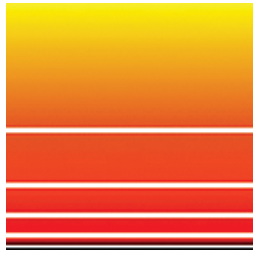
- Type: Public company
- Industry: Steel
- Founded: April 1, 1967; 59 years ago in Ahvaz, Iran
- Headquarters: Ahvaz, Iran
- Area served: Worldwide
- Products: Billet; Slab; Bloom
- Number of employees: + 10,000 (2018)
- Website: www.ksc.ir/en/home

Khouzestan Steel Company (KSC; Persian: شرکت فولاد خوزستان) is an Iranian steel manufacturing company located in the major city of Ahvaz. It is currently the second-largest producer of raw steel in Iran, following Isfahan Mobarakeh Steel Company. The company's factory, spanning 8.3 square kilometers, is situated near Ahvaz (10 kilometers on the Ahvaz–Imam Khomeini Port road), and its headquarters are also located in Ahvaz.

== History ==
Khouzestan Steel Company was established on April 1, 2018, as the first complex for direct reduction and electric arc furnace steel production in Iran. However, its inauguration took place in 1989 by Ali Khamenei (the then President). Khouzestan Steel, along with HEPCO, Ahvaz Rolling Mills Co., Shahin Rolling Mills, Shahdad Rolling Mills, Shahrokh Rolling Mills, Khouzestan Metal Industries Complex, Shahbaz Factory, and many other mines in Iran, such as the Sarcheshmeh copper mine, belonged to the Rezaei brothers before the Iranian Revolution. They were confiscated after the revolution and subsequently came under government control.

== Products ==
Khouzestan Steel Company produces three main products:

- Billet, also known as bloom, is an intermediate product of steel rolling with a cross-sectional area smaller than 230 square centimeters. The cross-sectional shape of this product is either circular or square with a width of less than 15 centimeters. Billets are mainly used for the production of rebar and wire.
- Slab is a semi-finished and intermediate product of steel obtained from the process of billet rolling or continuous casting. Unlike blooms and billets, the cross-sectional shape of slabs is rectangular and not square. Slabs are used as raw material for the production of flat-rolled products, including coils and hot-rolled sheets.
- Bloom, also known as bloom ingot, is a type of steel ingot with a width greater than 15 centimeters and a cross-sectional area larger than 23 square centimeters. Blooms are primarily used for the production of rails, beams, channels, tubes, and other similar products. When pure steel is extracted from raw materials, it is cast into bloom or bloom ingot molds.

== Gallery ==
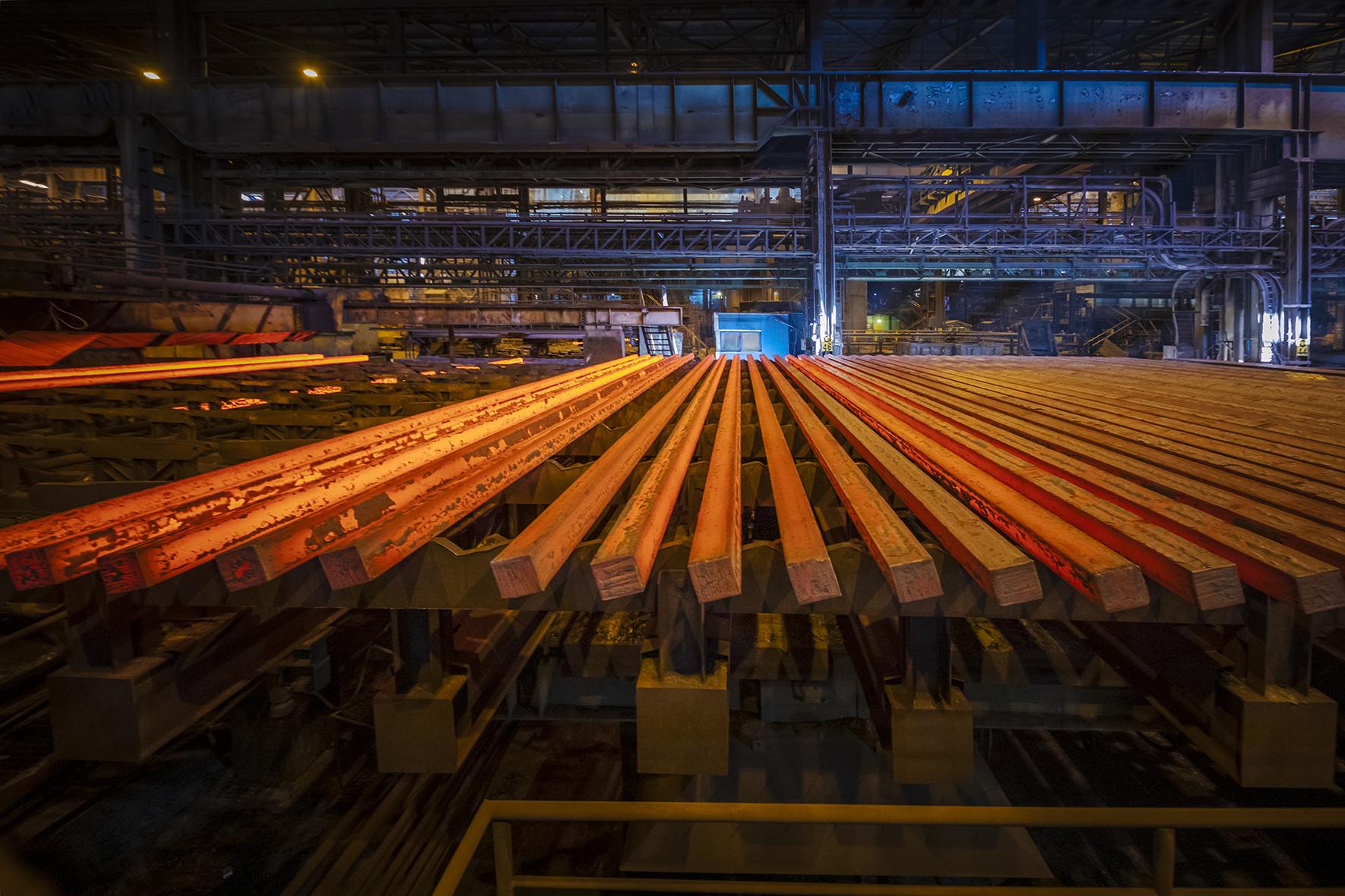

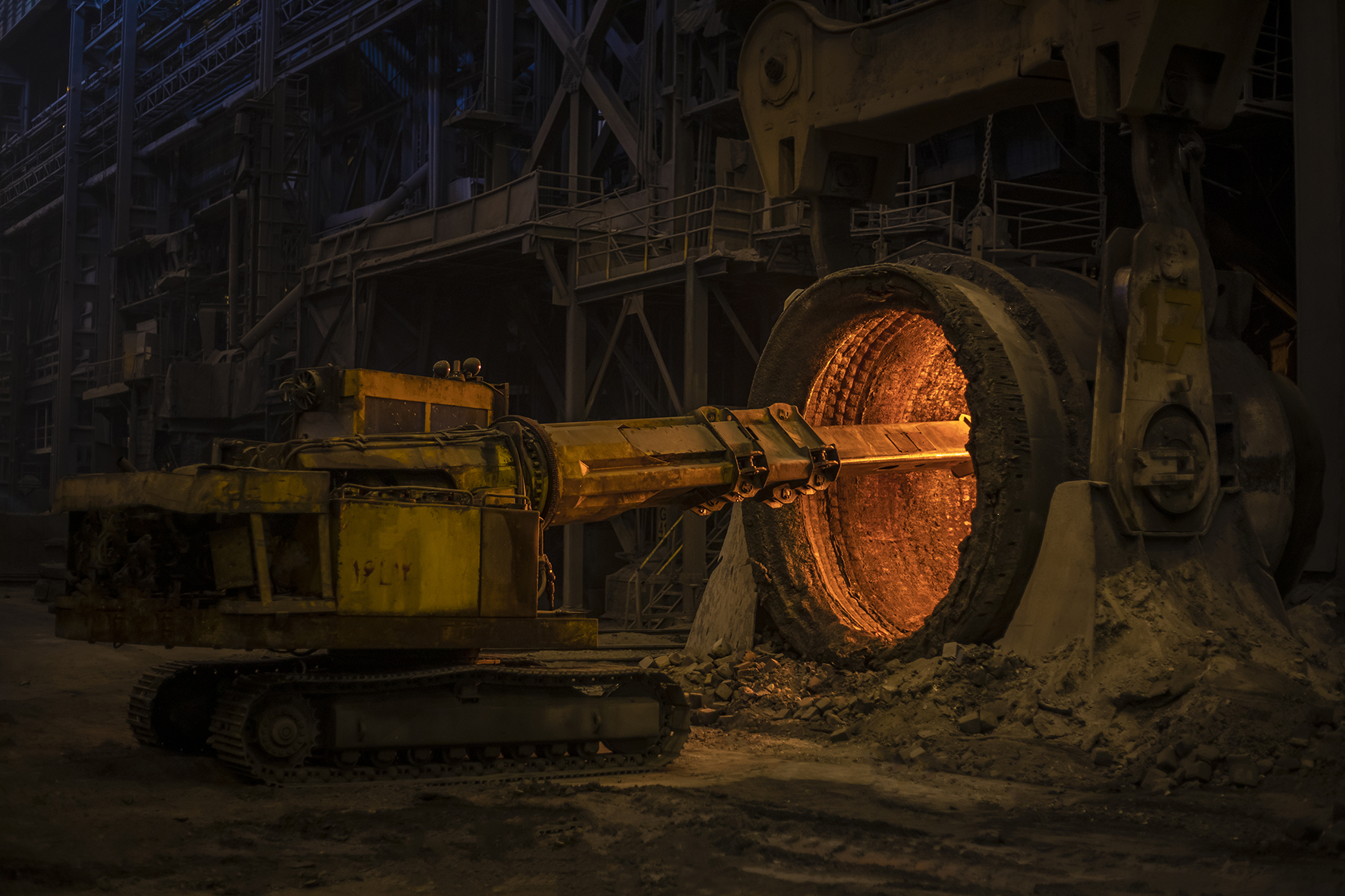

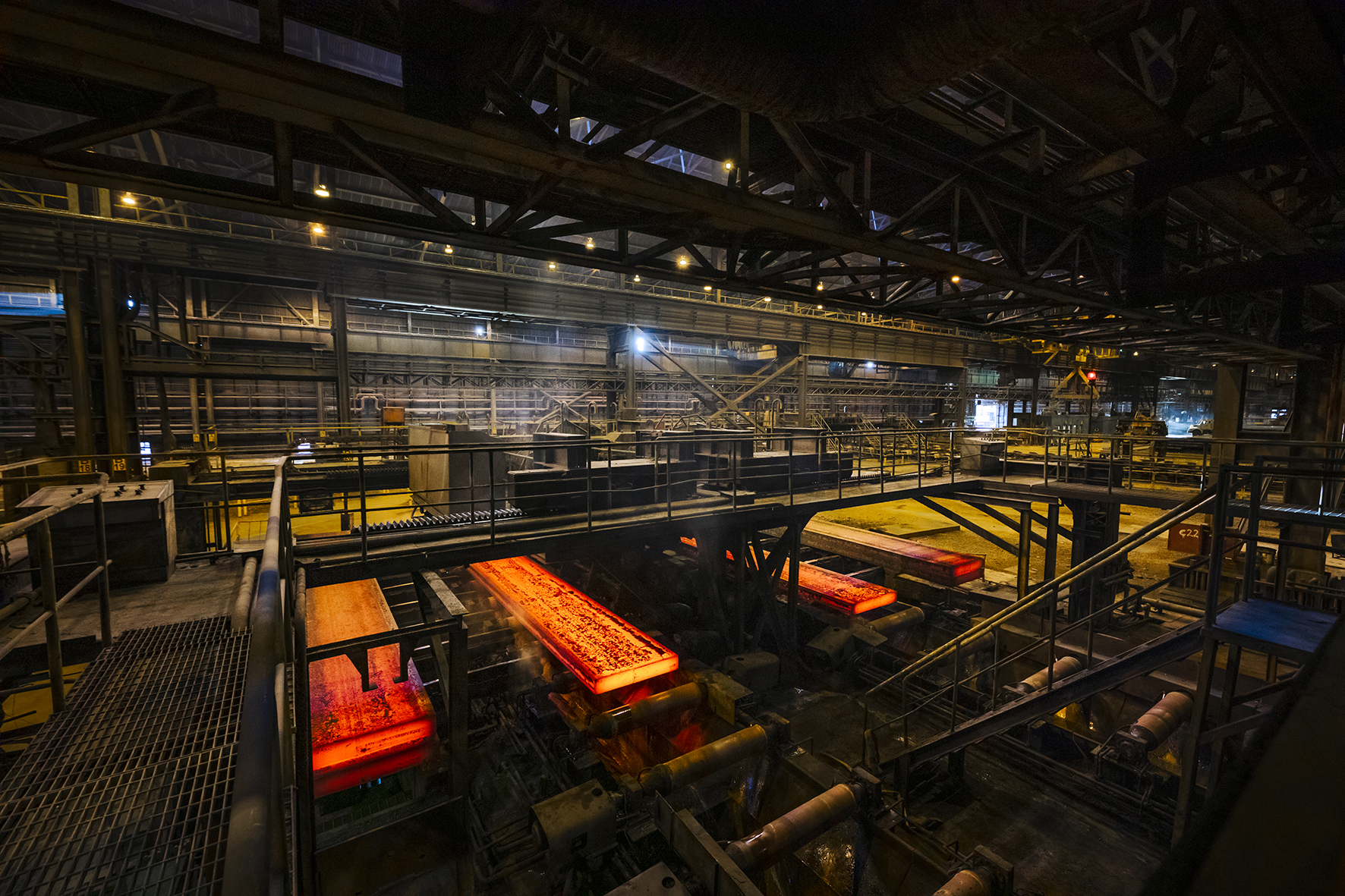

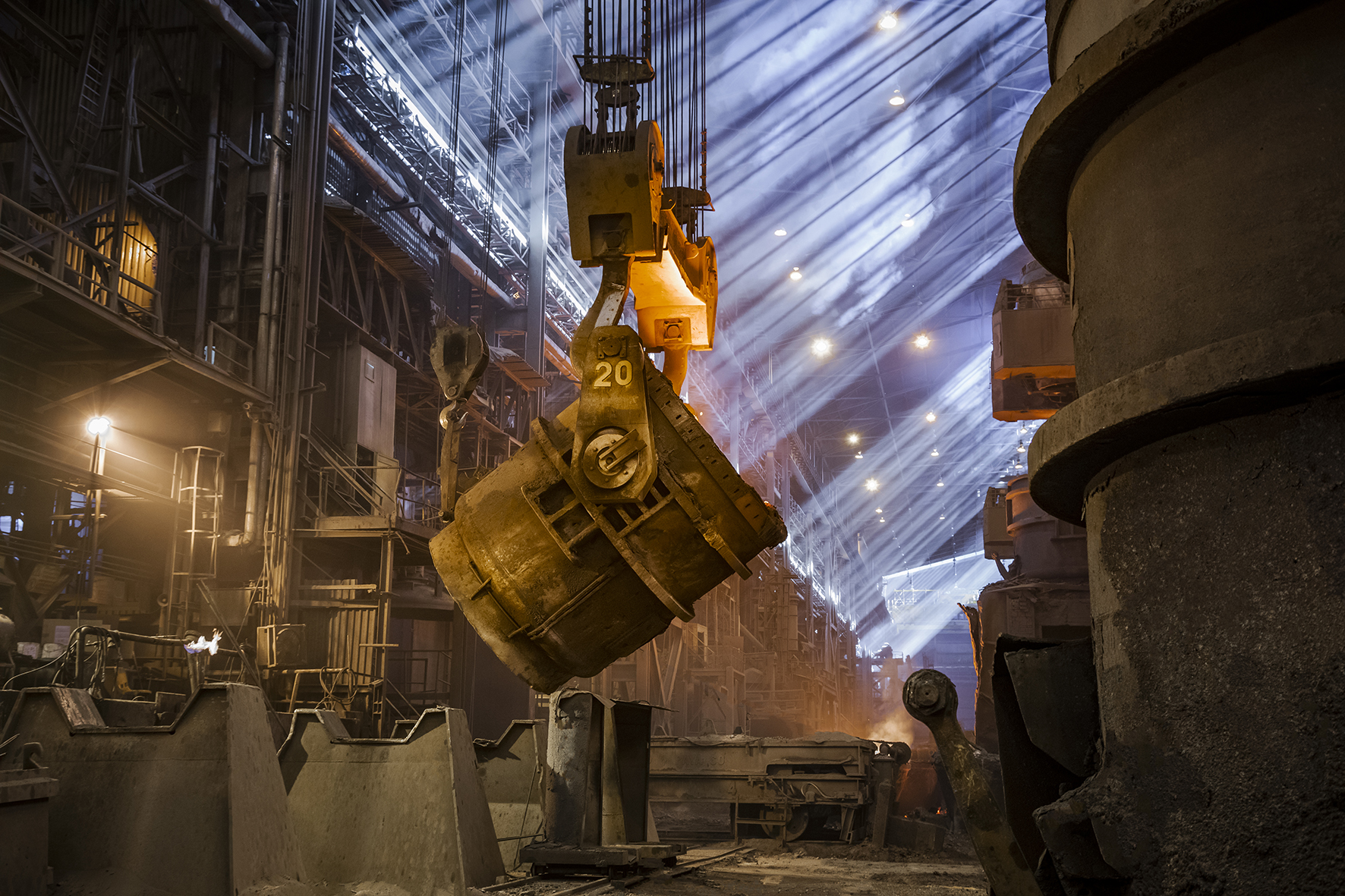
