= Ali Sina Rabbani =

Iranian footballer

Personal information
- Full name: Ali Sina Rabbani
- Date of birth: January 16, 1993 (age 33)
- Place of birth: Ahvaz, Iran
- Position: Midfielder

Team information
- Current team: Foolad
- Number: 29

Youth career
- 2009–2014: Foolad

Senior career*
Years	Team	Apps	(Gls)
2009–	Foolad	8	(0)

International career
2008–2011	Iran U-17		
- * Club domestic league appearances and goals as of 15 May 2015

Ali Sina Rabbani (Persian: علی سینا ربانی) is an Iranian football midfielder who currently plays for Iranian football club Foolad in the Iran Pro League.

== Club career ==
=== Foolad ===
He started his career with Foolad from youth levels. Later he joined to first team by Majid Jalali. He made his debut for Foolad in the third fixture of the 2014–15 Iran Pro League against Rah Ahan as a substitute for Soroush Rafiei.

== Club career statistics ==
As of 15 May 2015.

Club	Division	Season	League		Hazfi Cup		Asia		Total	
Club	Division	Season	Apps	Goals	Apps	Goals	Apps	Goals	Apps	Goals
Foolad	Pro League	2009–10	0	0	0	0	–	–	0	0
Foolad	Pro League	2010–11	0	0	0	0	–	–	0	0
Foolad	Pro League	2011–12	0	0	0	0	–	–	0	0
Foolad	Pro League	2012–13	0	0	0	0	–	–	0	0
Foolad	Pro League	2013–14	0	0	0	0	0	0	0	0
Foolad	Pro League	2014–15	8	0	0	0	1	0	9	0
Career Totals			8	0	0	0	1	0	9	0
