= Olympic Stadium (Kish) =

Football stadium in Kish, Iran

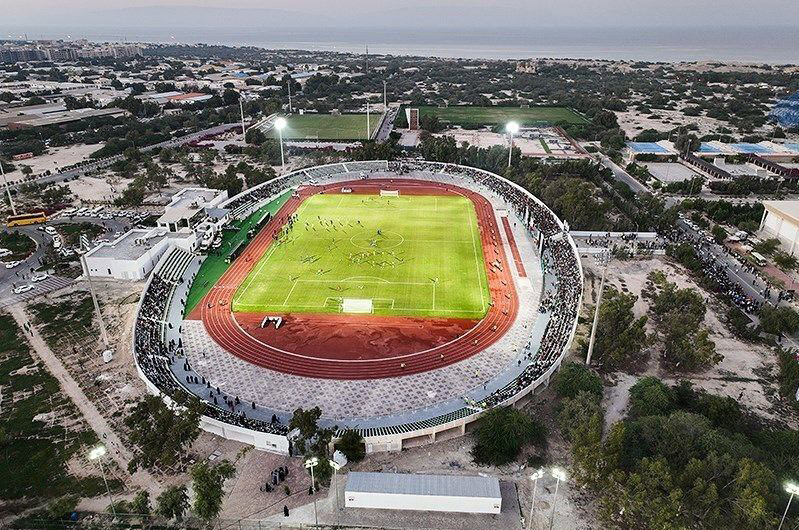
- Kish Olympic Stadium
- Interactive map of Olympic Stadium
- Full name: Kish Olympic Stadium
- Location: Kish, Kish Island (Hormozgan province), Iran
- Coordinates: 26.5583°N 53.9699°E
- Owner: Kish Free Zone Organization
- Operator: Kish Free Zone Organization
- Capacity: 8,000
- Surface: Hybrid grass

Construction
- Opened: 2005
- Renovated: 2022–2023

Tenants
- Iran national football team (Training and Selected matches)

The Olympic Stadium is a football stadium in Kish, Kish Island, Iran. The stadium, which has a capacity of 8,000 people, opened in 2005.

== International matches ==
Iran National Football Team

Date	Team #1	Res.	Team #2	Competition	Attendance
5 January 2024	Iran	2–1	Burkina Faso	Friendly	7,000

== See also ==
- List of football stadiums in Iran
