= Hamidreza Garshasbi =

Iranian sports executive

Hamidreza Garshasbi حمیدرضا گرشاسبی
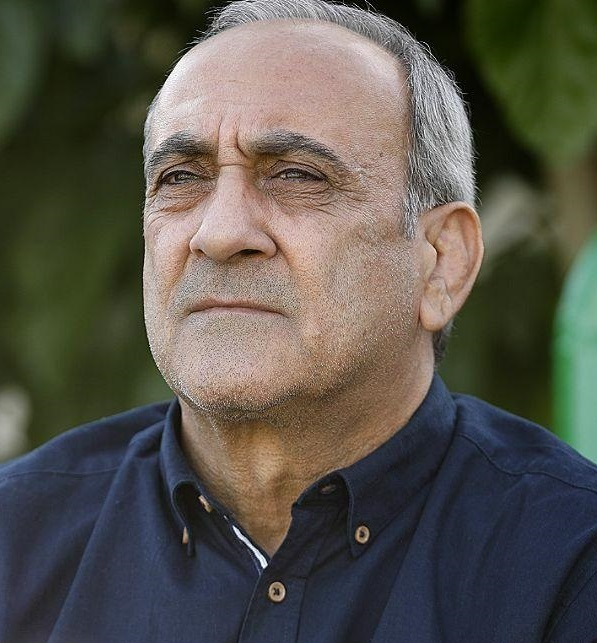
- Garshasbi in 2020
- Born: Dezful
- Title: President of Persepolis F.C. President of Paykan F.C. President of Foolad F.C.

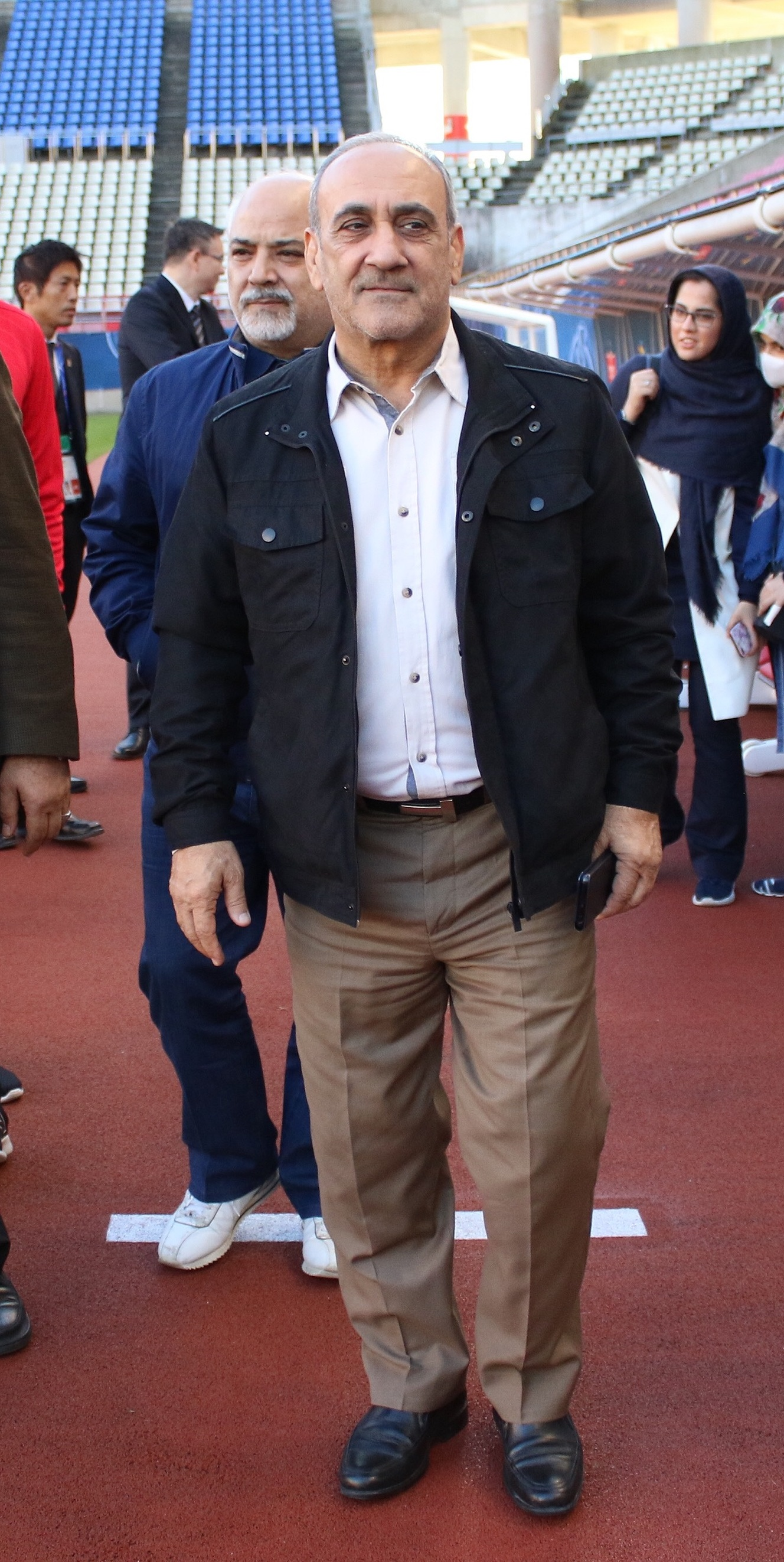
Garshasbi in Kashima Soccer Stadium, 2018.

Hamidreza Garshasbi (Persian: حمیدرضا گرشاسبی, also Romanized as "Hamīdrezā Garshāsbī") is an Iranian sports executive and administrator who has been served as president of the Persepolis Football Club. in November 2017, Garshasbi replaced Ali Akbar Taheri as Persepolis acting president. Under leadership of Garshasbi, Persepolis defended their title in Persian Gulf Pro League and advanced to the final of the 2018 AFC Champions League.

Preceded by Ali Akbar Taheri	Persepolis F.C. chairman 2017–2018	Succeeded by Iraj Arab
