= Arash Afshin =

Iranian footballer

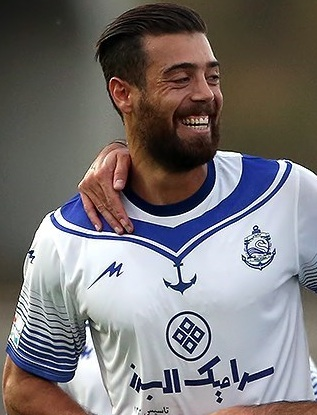
- Afshin while playing for Malavan

Personal information
- Full name: Arash Afshin
- Date of birth: 21 January 1989 (age 37)
- Place of birth: Ramhormoz, Khuzestan, Iran
- Height: 1.85 m (6 ft 1 in)
- Positions: Striker; winger

Team information
- Current team: Kheybar Khorram Abad

Youth career
- 2007–2008: Esteghlal
- 2008–2009: Foolad

Senior career*
Years	Team	Apps	(Gls)
2009–2016	Foolad	94	(19)
2013	→ Sepahan (loan)	14	(1)
2014–2016	→ Malavan (loan)	8	(3)
2016–2017	Esteghlal	3	(0)
2017	Esteghlal Khuzestan	13	(0)
2017–2018	Foolad	12	(1)
2019	Foolad	7	(1)
2021–	Shahrdari Astara	4	(2)
2021–2023	F.C. Kheybar Khorramabad	20	(4)

International career
2009–2011	Iran U23	15	(5)
2010–2012	Iran	4	(1)
- * Club domestic league appearances and goals

Arash Afshin (Persian: آرش افشین, born 21 January 1989) is an Iranian footballer. He is a former player of Iran national team and under-23 team.

== Club career ==
Afshin started his senior career at Foolad. In winter 2012, he was linked to Lille but move was not done. On 1 July 2013, he joined Sepahan on a one-year contract. In December 2013, he terminated his contract with Sepahan to join Foolad again.

=== Malavan ===
After facing conscription problems, he was forced to move a military-owned club. On November 12, 2014, he signed a 2-years contract with Iranian Navy's Malavan.

On 31 July 2015 on his debut for Malavan, Afshin scored the only goal in a 1–0 victory over Zob Ahan.

Club performance			League		Cup		Continental		Total	
Season	Club	League	Apps	Goals	Apps	Goals	Apps	Goals	Apps	Goals
Iran			League		Hazfi Cup		Asia		Total	
2009–10	Foolad	Persian Gulf Pro League	21	5	1	2	–	–	22	7
2010–11	Foolad	Persian Gulf Pro League	20	11	3	1	–	–	23	14
2011–12	Foolad	Persian Gulf Pro League	22	3	3	2	–	–	25	5
2012–13	Foolad	Persian Gulf Pro League	28	4	0	0	–	–	28	4
2013–14	Sepahan	Persian Gulf Pro League	13	1	1	0	0	0	14	1
2013–14	Foolad	Persian Gulf Pro League	8	2	2	0	1	0	11	2
2014–15	Foolad	Persian Gulf Pro League	0	0	0	0	0	0	0	0
2014–15	Malavan	Persian Gulf Pro League	0	0		0	–	–		0
2015–16	Malavan	Persian Gulf Pro League	8	3		0	–	–		3
2016–17	Esteghlal	Persian Gulf Pro League	3	0	1	0	0	0	4	0
Career total			123	29	11	5	1	0	135	34

Season	Team	Assists
09/10	Foolad	4
10/11	Foolad	3
11/12	Foolad	1
12/13	Foolad	4
13/14	Sepahan	1

== International career ==
After good performance with Iran U23 in 2010 Asian Games and also in Foolad he convinced Afshin Ghotbi to invite him to Team Melli

On 2 January 2011, Afshin was called up to the Iran for the team's friendly match against Angola and made his debut.

He was also one of Iran players in 2011 AFC Asian Cup.

=== International goals ===
Scores and results list Iran's goal tally first.

#	Date	Venue	Opponent	Score	Result	Competition
1	19 January 2011	Qatar SC Stadium, Doha	United Arab Emirates	1–0	3–0	Asian Cup 2011

== Honours ==
Foolad

- Iran Pro League (1): 2013–14

== Personal life ==
He is currently Student of Civil Engineering at Islamic Azad University Ramhormoz Branch.
