= Jalal Kameli Mofrad =

Iranian footballer

Jalal Kameli-Mofrad
Personal information
- Full name: Jalal Kameli-Mofrad
- Date of birth: 15 May 1981 (age 45)
- Place of birth: Shadegan, Iran
- Height: 1.82 m (6 ft 0 in)
- Position: Centre-back

Youth career
- 1990–1999: Foolad

Senior career*
| Years | Team | Apps | (Gls) |
| 1998–2012 | Foolad | 270 | |
| 2006–2007 | → Esteghlal Ahvaz (loan) | 24 | (0) |
| 2012–2013 | Paykan | 22 | (1) |

International career^{‡}
| 2002–2003 | Iran U–23 | | |
| 2002–2007 | Iran | 29 | (1) |
Medal record
Representing Iran
Asian Games
| Gold medal – first place | 2002 Busan | Team competition |
- * Club domestic league appearances and goals as of 15 July 2019 ‡ National team caps and goals as of 2 June 2007

Jalal Kameli-Mofrad (Persian: جلال كاملی مفرد, born 15 May 1981 in Shadegan, Iran) is an Iranian football player.

== Club career ==
Kameli Mofrad started his career at Foolad FC. At first, due to his physical style, Mofrad played some good football and became a regular stater for his club. He was a member of the 2004–05 Foolad team that won the Iran's Premier League football championship. The season after though his performances significantly dropped in quality and he got less playing time. When Mayeli Kohan became the team's manager Mofrad, along with a number of the other well known Foolad players, left the club. In August 2006 he signed with Foolad's rival, Esteghlal Ahvaz but only stayed for one season. He then moved back to Foolad and played on the 2007–08 and 2008–09 seasons for them.

=== Club career statistics ===
As of 15 July 2019

| Club performance | | | League | | Cup | | Continental | | Total | |
| Season | Club | League | Apps | Goals | Apps | Goals | Apps | Goals | Apps | Goals |
| Iran | | | League | | Hazfi Cup | | Asia | | Total | |
|---|---|---|---|---|---|---|---|---|---|---|
| 2001 – 2002 | Foolad | Pro League | 16 | 0 | 0 | 0 | | | | |
| 2002–03 | Foolad | Pro League | 24 | 0 | 1 | 0 | — | | 16 | 0 |
| 2003–04 | Foolad | Pro League | 23 | 0 | 1 | 0 | — | | 20 | 0 |
| 2004–05 | Foolad | Pro League | 26 | 0 | 1 | 0 | — | | 26 | 0 |
| 2005–06 | Foolad | Pro League | 24 | 0 | 0 | 0 | 6 | 0 | 24 | 0 |
| 2006–07 | Esteghlal Ahvaz | Pro League | 24 | 0 | 1 | 0 | — | | 24 | 0 |
| 2007–08 | Foolad | Division 1 | 22 | 0 | 2 | 0 | — | | 24 | 0 |
| 2008–09 | Foolad | Pro League | 27 | 0 | 1 | 0 | — | | 28 | 0 |
| 2009–10 | Foolad | Pro League | 29 | 0 | 1 | 0 | — | | 30 | 0 |
| 2010–11 | Foolad | Pro League | 18 | 0 | 2 | 0 | — | | 20 | 0 |
| 2011–12 | Foolad | Pro League | 28 | 0 | 0 | 0 | — | | 28 | 0 |
| 2012–13 | Paykan | Pro League | 22 | 1 | 0 | 0 | — | | 22 | 1 |
| Career total | | | 255 | 1 | 10 | 0 | 6 | 0 | 271 | 1 |

- Assist Goals

| Season | Team | Assists |
|---|---|---|
| 10–11 | Foolad | 0 |
| 11-12 | Foolad | 0 |

== International career ==
Jalal Kameli Mofrad was one of the players who won the gold medal in the football tournament of the 2002 Asian Games in Busan, South Korea, along with the Iran Olympic team. He had received his first cap for the national team, a number of weeks before that tournament on 1 September 2002 versus Jordan. He was a constant call up to the national team until 2005, but his poor form in the 2005–06 season cost him his spot in the national team.

Having been a couple of years away from Team Melli, in June 2007 he was once again called up to the national team and appeared in a friendly match against Mexico.

== Honours ==
=== Club ===
Persian Gulf Cup 2003–04 with Foolad

=== National ===
WAFF 2004
