= Ayoub Vali =

Iranian footballer

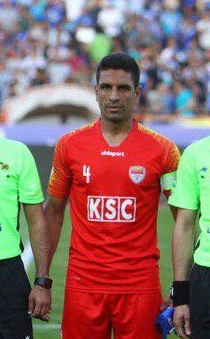
- Vali with Foolad in 2019

Personal information
- Date of birth: 9 August 1987 (age 39)
- Place of birth: Ahwaz, Iran
- Height: 1.83 m (6 ft 0 in)
- Position: Defender

Team information
- Current team: Foolad B (manager)

Senior career*
Years	Team	Apps	(Gls)
2008–2024	Foolad	202	(14)

Managerial career
- 2024–: Foolad B
- * Club domestic league appearances and goals

Ayoub Vali (Persian: ایوب والی; born 9 August 1987) is an Iranian football coach and a former player who is the manager of Foolad B in League 2.

== Club career ==
Vali is a graduate of the Foolad Youth Academy and has played his entire career for Foolad.

== Club career statistics ==
As of 6 April 2019.

Club	Division	Season	League		Hazfi Cup		Asia		Total	
Club	Division	Season	Apps	Goals	Apps	Goals	Apps	Goals	Apps	Goals
Foolad	Pro League	2008–09	4	0	2	0	—	—	6	0
Foolad	Pro League	2009–10	16	0	0	0	—	—	16	0
Foolad	Pro League	2010–11	5	0	0	0	—	—	5	0
Foolad	Pro League	2011–12	11	0	1	0	—	—	12	0
Foolad	Pro League	2012–13	20	0	1	0	—	—	21	0
Foolad	Pro League	2013–14	26	0	2	0	6	1	34	1
Foolad	Pro League	2014–15	19	0	0	0	0	0	19	0
Foolad	Pro League	2015–16	23	5	0	0	—	—	23	5
Foolad	Pro League	2016–17	27	5	1	0	—	—	28	5
Foolad	Pro League	2017–18	24	1	2	0	—	—	26	1
Foolad	Pro League	2018–19	25	1	2	0	—	—	27	1
Foolad	Pro League	2019–20	18	4	0	0	—	—	18	4
Foolad	Pro League	2020-21	1	0	0	0	0	0	1	0
Foolad	Pro League	2021-22	5	0	0	0	1	0	6	0
Foolad	Pro League	2022-23	10	0	0	0	0	0	10	0
Foolad	Pro League	2023-24	1	0	0	0	0	0	1	0
Career total			213	16	13	0	6	1	253	17

- Assist Goals

Season	Team	Assists
10–11	Foolad	0
11–12	Foolad	0
12–13	Foolad	1
13–14	Foolad	3
14–15	Foolad	0

== Honours ==
=== Club ===
Foolad

- Iran Pro League: 2013–14
- Hazfi Cup: 2020–21
- Iranian Super Cup: 2021
