= Omid Khaledi =

Iranian footballer

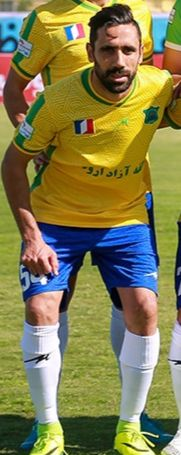

Personal information
- Full name: Omid Khaledi
- Date of birth: November 30, 1987 (age 38)
- Place of birth: Ramshir, Iran
- Height: 1.79 m (5 ft 10 in)
- Position: Left back

Team information
- Current team: Foolad B
- Number: 21

Senior career*
Years	Team	Apps	(Gls)
2008–2009	Shahin Ahvaz		
2011–2016	Foolad	112	(3)
2016–2019	Saipa	73	(2)
2020–2021	Mes Rafsanjan	3	(0)
2021–2023	Sanat Naft	64	(1)
2023–2024	Esteghlal Mollasani	12	(0)
2024–	Foolad B	40	(1)
- * Club domestic league appearances and goals as of 17:19, 13 April 2018 (UTC)

Omid Khaledi (born 29 October 1988) is an Iranian footballer playing for Foolad B in the Azadegan League.

== Career ==
Khaledi made his debut Rah Ahan in a 0–0 draw. He scored his first goal against Mes Kerman. On 25 April 2014, he played the full 90 minutes in an AFC Champions League match against El Jaish SC of Qatar.

== Club career statistics ==
As of 15 May 2015

Club	Division	Season	League		Hazfi Cup		Asia		Total	
Club	Division	Season	Apps	Goals	Apps	Goals	Apps	Goals	Apps	Goals
Foolad	Pro League	2011–12	13	1	1	0	–	–	14	1
Foolad	Pro League	2012–13	22	0	1	0	–	–	23	0
Foolad	Pro League	2013–14	25	1	2	0	8	0	35	1
Foolad	Pro League	2014–15	20	0	1	0	4	0	25	0
Foolad	Pro League	2015-16	23	1	2	0	0	0	25	1
Foolad	Total		103	3	7	0	12	0	122	3
Saipa	Persian Gulf Pro League	2016-17	27	0	4	0	0	0	31	0
Saipa	Persian Gulf Pro League	2017-18	27	1	1	0	0	0	28	1
Saipa	Persian Gulf Pro League	2018-19	19	0	4	0	2	0	25	0
Saipa	Total		73	1	9	0	2	0	84	1
Mes Rafsanjan	2020-21	Persian Gulf Pro League	3	0	0	0	0	0	3	0
Sanat	2020-21	Persian Gulf Pro League	14	0	2	0	0	0	16	0
Sanat	2021-22	Persian Gulf Pro League	26	0	0	0	0	0	26	0
Sanat	2022-23	Persian Gulf Pro League	24	1	1	0	0	0	25	1
Sanat	Total		64	1	3	0	0	0	67	1
Esteghlal Mollasani	2023-24	Azadegan League	4	0	0	0	0	0	4	0
Career total			247	5	19	0	14	0	280	5

== Honours ==
Foolad

- Iran Pro League (1): 2013–14
