= Shahab Karami =

Iranian footballer

Personal information
- Date of birth: 16 March 1991 (age 35)
- Place of birth: Kermanshah, Iran
- Height: 1.84 m (6 ft 1/2 in)
- Position: Defensive midfielder

Team information
- Current team: Shahr Khodro F.C.
- Number: 15

Senior career*
| Years | Team | Apps | (Gls) |
| 2009–2010 | Petrochimi Tabriz | 8 | (0) |
| 2010–2011 | Mes Sarcheshme | 17 | (0) |
| 2011–2012 | Shahrdari Yasuj | 14 | (1) |
| 2012–2015 | Foolad | 62 | (0) |
| 2015–2017 | Malavan | 38 | (0) |
| 2017 | Persepolis | 8 | (0) |
| 2017–2018 | Sepidrood | 9 | (0) |
| 2020 | Shahin Bushehr F.C. | | |

International career^{‡}
| 2012–2014 | Iran U22 | 10 | (0) |
- * Club domestic league appearances and goals as of 15 May 2015 ‡ National team caps and goals as of 25 March 2013

Shahab Karami (born March 16, 1991) is an Iranian footballer who plays for Shahin Bushehr F.C.

== Club career ==
In summer 2012 he participated in Paykan's pre-season trainings and signed a pre-contract.<ref[>http://pana.ir/NSite/FullStory/News/?Id=318225 Pana website] </ref> But after 2013 AFC U-22 Asian Cup qualification, he signed a two-year contract with Foolad. As summer 2014 he signed a three-year contract extension.

=== Club career statistics ===
As of 15 May 2015

| Club | Division | Season | League | | Hazfi Cup | | Asia | | Total | |
| Club | Division | Season | Apps | Goals | Apps | Goals | Apps | Goals | Apps | Goals |
|---|---|---|---|---|---|---|---|---|---|---|
| Petrochimi Tabriz | Division 1 | 2009–10 | 3 | 0 | | | – | – | | |
| Mes Sarcheshme | Division 1 | 2010–11 | 0 | 0 | | | – | – | | |
| Shahrdari Yasuj | Division 1 | 2011–12 | 14 | 1 | | | – | – | 14 | 1 |
| Foolad | Pro League | 2012–13 | 31 | 0 | 0 | 0 | – | – | 5 | 0 |
| Foolad | Pro League | 2013–14 | 21 | 0 | 2 | 0 | 7 | 0 | 30 | 0 |
| Foolad | Pro League | 2014–15 | 12 | 0 | 1 | 0 | 0 | 0 | 13 | 0 |
| Career total | | | 81 | 1 | | | 7 | 0 | | |

== International ==
=== Youth levels ===
He is invited to Iran U-22 by Alireza Mansourian to competing in 2013 AFC U-22 Asian Cup qualification.

== Honours ==
Foolad

- Persian Gulf Pro League (1): 2013–14

Persepolis

- Persian Gulf Pro League (1): 2016–17
- Iranian Super Cup: 2017
