= Mehrdad Jama'ati =

Iranian footballer

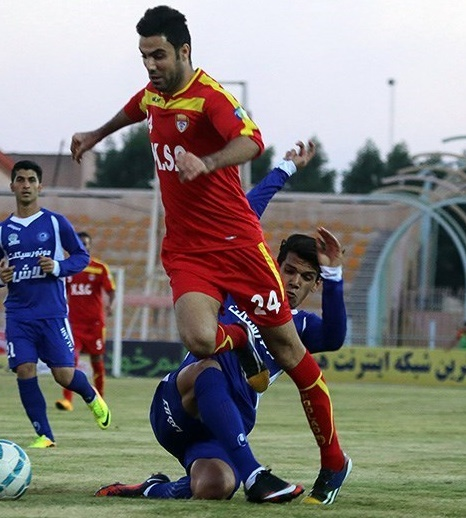

Personal information
- Full name: Mehrdad Jama'ati
- Date of birth: 7 October 1989 (age 37)
- Place of birth: Izeh, Iran
- Height: 1.86 m (6 ft 1 in)
- Position: Left back

Team information
- Current team: Malavan

Youth career
- 2006–2009: Foolad

Senior career*
Years	Team	Apps	(Gls)
2009–2017	Foolad	161	(6)
2017	Sepidrood	7	(0)

International career
2010–2013	Iran U23	14	(1)
2014	Iran	4	(0)
- * Club domestic league appearances and goals as of 13 March 2018

Mehrdad Jama'ati (born October 7, 1989) is an Iranian footballer who most recently played for Sepidrood Rasht S.C. in the Iran Pro League as well as Iran national football team.

== Club career ==
Jama'ati signed his first professional contract in 2009 and has played his entire career for Foolad.

Club performance			League		Cup		Continental		Total	
Season	Club	League	Apps	Goals	Apps	Goals	Apps	Goals	Apps	Goals
Iran			League		Hazfi Cup		Asia		Total	
2009–10	Foolad	Pro League	5	0	0	0	-	-	5	0
2010–11	Foolad	Pro League	26	1	0	0	-	-	26	1
2011–12	Foolad	Pro League	30	1	2	0	-	-	32	1
2012–13	Foolad	Pro League	32	1	0	0	-	-	32	1
2013–14	Foolad	Pro League	27	2	2	0	5	0	34	2
2014–15	Foolad	Pro League	21	1	1	0	3	1	25	2
2015–16	Foolad	Pro League	10	0		0		0	10	1
2016–17	Foolad	Pro League	10	0		0		0	10	1
Career total			161	6	5	0	8	1	174	7

- Assist Goals

Season	Team	Assists
09–10	Foolad	0
10–11	Foolad	1
11–12	Foolad	0
12–32	Foolad	2
13–14	Foolad	2
14–15	Foolad	0

== International career ==
He made his debut against Kuwait in the 2015 AFC Asian Cup qualification match on 3 March 2014.

== Honours ==
Foolad

- Iran Pro League: 2013–14
