= Yousef Vakia =

Iranian footballer

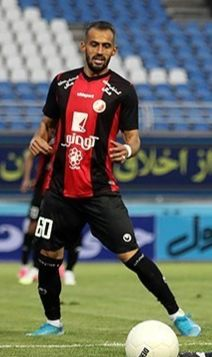

Personal information
- Full name: Yousef Vakia
- Date of birth: September 30, 1993 (age 33)
- Place of birth: Andimeshk, Iran
- Height: 1.80 m (5 ft 11 in)
- Position: Right back

Team information
- Current team: Shahr Khodrou
- Number: 60

Youth career
- 2007–2014: Foolad

Senior career*
Years	Team	Apps	(Gls)
2011–2018	Foolad	63	(1)
2018–2019	Naft Masjed Soleyman	26	(0)
2019–2021	Gol Gohar Sirjan	29	(0)
2021–	Shahr Khodrou	1	(0)

International career^{‡}
2008–2011	Iran U17		
2011–2012	Iran U20	17	(0)
2014–2016	Iran U23	5	(0)
- * Club domestic league appearances and goals as of 13 October 2016 ‡ National team caps and goals as of 31 March 2015

Yousef Vakia (Persian: يوسف وکيا) is an Iranian football defender who currently plays for Iranian football club Shahr Khodrou in the Persian Gulf Pro League.

== Club career ==
=== Foolad ===
He started his career with Foolad from youth levels. Later he joined to first team by Hossein Faraki. He made his debut for Foolad in the first fixture of the 2014–15 Iran Pro League against Tractor Sazi as a starter.

== Club career statistics ==
As of 15 May 2015.

Club	Division	Season	League		Hazfi Cup		Asia		Total	
Club	Division	Season	Apps	Goals	Apps	Goals	Apps	Goals	Apps	Goals
Foolad	Pro League	2012–13	0	0	0	0	–	–	0	0
Foolad	Pro League	2013–14	0	0	0	0	0	0	0	0
Foolad	Pro League	2014–15	25	1	1	0	5	0	31	1
Career Totals			25	1	1	0	5	0	31	1

== International career ==
=== U17 ===
He played two marches at the 2010 Asian U16 Championships.

=== U20 ===
He was part of Iran U–20 during 2012 AFC U-19 Championship qualification, 2012 CIS Cup, 2012 AFF U-19 Youth Championship and 2012 AFC U-19 Championship.

=== U23 ===
He invited to Iran U-23 training camp by Nelo Vingada to preparation for Incheon 2014 and 2016 AFC U-22 Championship (Summer Olympic qualification). He named in Iran U23 final list for Incheon 2014.

== Honours ==
Foolad

- Iran Pro League (1): 2013–14
