= Foolad F.C. =

Iranian football club

Foolad فولاد خوزستان
- Full name: Foolad Khuzestan Football Club
- Nicknames: Foolad Mardaan (Men of Steel); Leopard of Khuzestan ‌ "The Steel Men" "The Men in Red" "The Reds" "The Lions" "Iran's Reds" "The Galácticos"; A Galaxy of Stars
- Founded: 2 March 1971; 55 years ago
- Ground: Foolad Arena
- Capacity: 30,655
- Owner: Foolad Khuzestan Company
- Chairman: Hamidreza Garshasbi
- Head Coach: Hamid Motahari
- League: Persian Gulf Pro League
- 2025–26: Persian Gulf Pro League, 7th of 16
- Website: www.fooladfc.ir
Home colours	Away colours	Third colours

Foolad Khuzestan Football Club (, Bāshgāh-e Futbāl-e Fulād-e Khuzestān) is an Iranian professional football club based in Ahvaz, Khuzestan, that plays in Persian Gulf Pro League. The club was founded in 1971 and is owned by Foolad Khuzestan Company. Foolad is considered one of the best football clubs in Irant; it is also one of the most decorated clubs in the country, having ranked as the top Iranian team in Asia and globally for several years.

Foolad Khuzestan Football Club is considered the fourth-best club in the history of Iranian football, following Esteghlal, Persepolis, and Sepahan. Foolad secured its first Iranian league title in 2004 during the third season of the Persian Gulf Pro League.

Foolad ranks as the fourth most decorated club in Iran. Among the club's most significant achievements are two Persian Gulf Pro League titles (2004–05 and 2013–14 seasons), one Hazfi Cup title (2020–21), and two Iranian Super Cup titles (along with one runner-up finish). Additionally, the club has finished as the runner-up in the Hazfi Cup on two occasions, in 1993 and 1996. Among Foolad's other honors are nine provincial league titles, where Foolad Khuzestan secured nine separate trophies. The team has finished in third place in the league four times; additionally, their record includes six appearances in the AFC Champions League (Asia's top-tier club competition) and one appearance in the Asian Cup Winners' Cup (Asia's second-tier competition, during the 1994–95 season). Among Foolad's other honors are nine provincial league titles, where Foolad Khuzestan secured nine separate trophies. The team has finished in third place in the league four times; additionally, their record includes six appearances in the AFC Champions League (Asia's top-tier club competition) and one appearance in the Asian Cup Winners' Cup (Asia's second-tier competition, during the 1994–95 season).

The club has won Iran Pro League twice, as well as a championship in the lower division, Azadegan League. In the 2004–05 season, Foolad became the champion of the fourth newly founded Iran Pro League (IPL), gaining a total of 64 points over 30 league matches. After several seasons, Foolad lost many of its key players through transfers and internal problems and also displayed a poor performance in the 2006 AFC Champions League. The club was subsequently relegated to the Azadegan League, second highest division in Iran at the end of 2006–07. However, Foolad was able to return to the IPL starting from the next season, 2008–09 Iran Pro League. Foolad won its second championship in the 2013–14 season. The club also won their first Hazfi Cup title in the 2020–21 season.

To date, two Foolad players—Reza Norouzi and Chimba—have finished as the top scorers of the Iranian football Premier League. Foolad has reached the semi-finals of the AFC Champions League. Despite deserving a spot in the final, the team lost 1–0 to Al-Hilal in the Asian semi-finals.

== Club history ==
=== Establishment and first years (1971–1995) ===
Foolad Khuzestan Football Club was founded on March 2, 1971, in Ahvaz by Ali-Akbar Davar, who at the time served as the head of the Khuzestan Steel Company. Foolad is one of Iran's four major football clubs, as well as one of the country's most popular and decorated teams.. Foolad won the Ahwaz City Championship in 1991 and entered the 2nd division of the Khuzestan football league two years later. Foolad won the first group in its debut season and was promoted to the Ahwaz's first league which they won in their debut season as well. This meant they would be promoted to the Khuzestan Provincial Leagues.

=== Road to the Highest Division (1995–2001) ===
In 1995, which was Foolad's second year in the Khuzestan's Second Division, they became provincial champions. That same year Jonoub Ahvaz was contracted and Foolad took their place in Iran Football's 2nd Division. In 1996, with Homayoun Shahrokhinejad as manager, the team was promoted to the 1st division.

=== Frančić era (2004–2006) ===
The team was eventually bought by the Ahwaz Steel Mill. The team was finally able to win the IPL in the 2004–05 season but due to some ensuing internal problems and coaching difficulties could not perform well in the 2006 Asian Champions League.

=== ACL and relegation (2006–2007) ===
After a mediocre 2005–06, Foolad started the 2006–07 season with former Iranian national team coach Mohammad Mayeli Kohan, but he resigned halfway through the season as Foolad had achieved poor results. Youth club coach Nenad Nikolić temporarily replaced him and soon after Portuguese manager Augusto Inácio was named head coach. Foolad went through a terrible 2006–07 season finishing 15th and being relegated to the lower Azadegan League.

=== Return to First Division and Jalali years (2007–2012) ===
After being relegated, they earned promotion back to the Iranian Premier League by winning the league title.

On September 1, 2009, Seifollah Dehkordi was elected as the club's president after previous president Masoud Rezaeian resigned from his position. After the election of Dehkordi, Majid Jalali left the club despite good results. Luka Bonačić was named as Jalali's successor but he could not please the club as he was not able to win a single match in first eight weeks and the club decided to bring Majid Jalali back where they finished the league 10th. At the Jalali's final year as Foolad manager, the club ended the season at the 14th place, the worst since their promotion back to the league.

=== League success under Faraki (2012–2014) ===
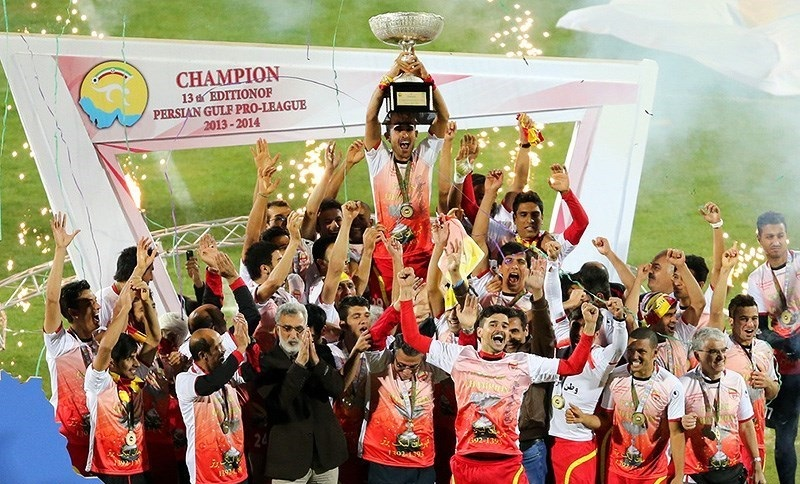
Foolad players celebrating winning their second IPL title in 2014

After Jalali's contract was not renewed, Naft Tehran manager Hossein Faraki was named as the club's new head coach. He led Foolad to the 4th rank in his first season as the club's manager, gaining an AFC Champions League spot for the second time in the Foolad's history. In the 2013–14 Iran Pro League season, Faraki led the club to their second Iran Pro League title, his team finished with 57 points. They finished 2 points clear of second place Persepolis. Five days later, Foolad advanced to the Round of 16 of the AFC Champions League for the first time after they defeated El-Jaish of Qatar. Foolad lost to Al Sadd on away goals.

On 23 May 2014, Faraki resigned as the manager of the club, due to knee problems, despite two good seasons with Foolad. Dragan Skočić was named as his successor.

== Reserve team ==
Foolad Novin is the reserve side of Foolad. In 2014 they were promoted to the Azadegan League for the second time in their history. Foolad Yazd is not Foolad's reserve team, but is a feeder club, they also compete in the Azadegan League.

== Youth academy ==
In April 1999, Foolad formed a youth academy.

== Kit ==
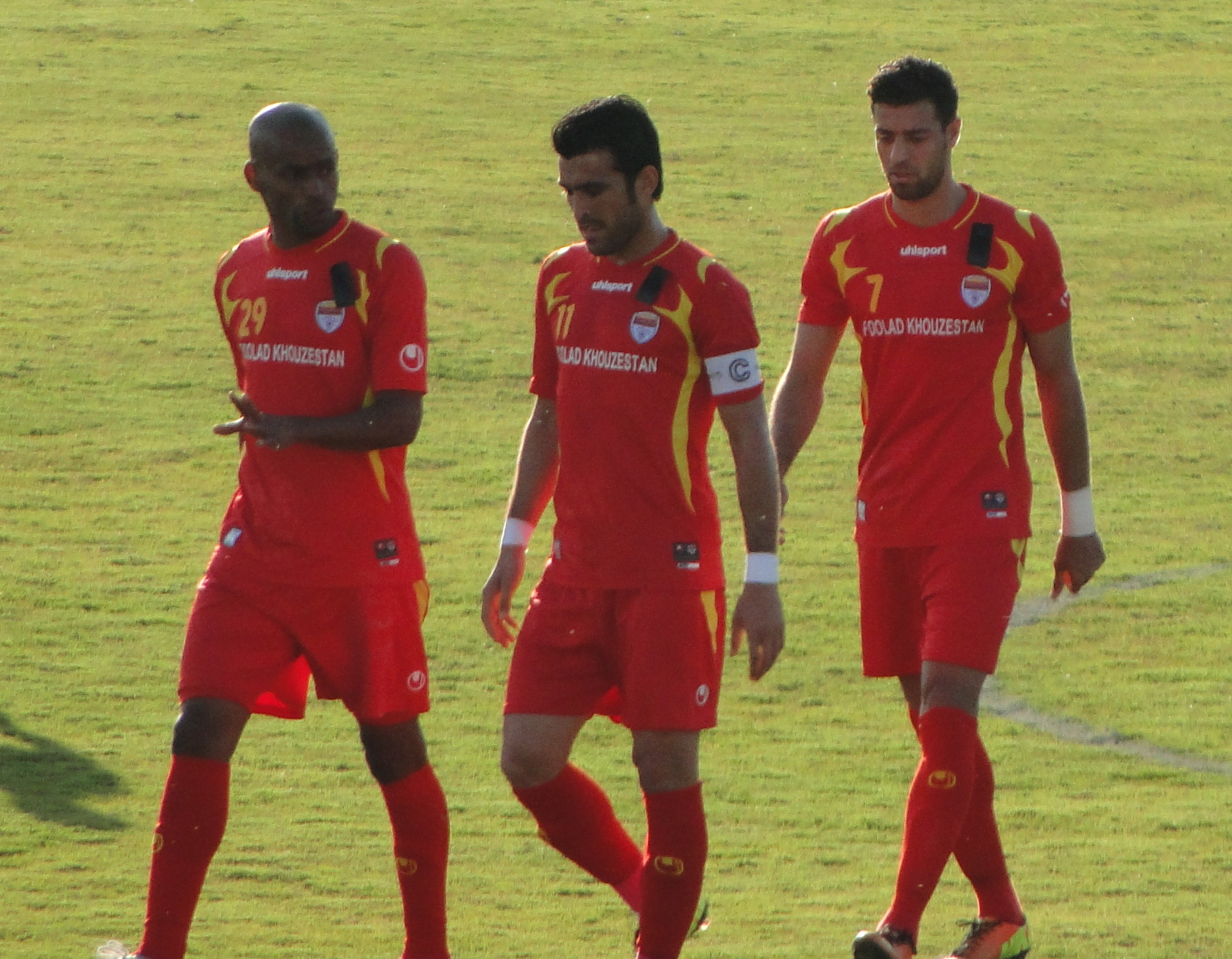
Three Foolad players (Arash Afshin, Bakhtiar Rahmani and Chimba) wear the shirts for 2012–13 season

The name and symbol of the club adapted from its founder and owner company, Foolad. Its symbol means that is related to steel production process. The club's logo repeatedly changed but the overall layout is preserved. After Foolad's league title in 2006, club added a golden star above the team logo etched into the club's shirt, but this was not accepted by the Islamic Republic of Iran Football Federation. So there is not any star on the club's official logo.

Foolad began playing in red, yellow and black, but then changed the yellow to white since 1999. The kit has been made by Nike until 2002. Then Merooj and Daei Sport were the club's kit manufacturers. Uhlsport is the current kit manufacturers, made the kits from past four years. The club currently doesn't have any official sponsor as the club's company name is inserted on the shirts.

Years	Manufacturers	Sponsors
2001–02	Daei	None
2002–03	Daei	None
2003–04	Daei	O'GENERAL
2004–05	Daei	None
2005–06	Daei	None
2006–07	Daei	Tefal*
2007–08	Daei	None
2008–09	Merooj	Jundishapur University
2009–10	Daei	None
2010–11	Daei	None
2011–12	uhlsport	None
2012–13	uhlsport	None
2013–14	uhlsport	KSC
2014–15	uhlsport	KSC
2015–16	uhlsport	KSC
2016–17	uhlsport	KSC
2017–18	uhlsport	KSC
2018–19	uhlsport	KSC
2019–20	uhlsport	KSC
2020–21	Merooj	Tak Makaron
2021–22	Merooj	KSC
2022–23	Merooj	KSC

- – Tefal was the sponsor of the team in only some matches not full season.

== Rivals ==
The team competes in Ahvaz derby against Esteghlal Khuzestan which is a new born club. The first time the teams met each other was in season 2013–14 which Esteghlal Khuzestan lost that game.

== Players ==
=== First-team squad ===
As of 18 August 2026

Note: Flags indicate national team as defined under FIFA eligibility rules; some limited exceptions apply. Players may hold more than one non-FIFA nationality.

No.	Pos.	Nation	Player
2	DF	IRI	Abolfazl Razzaghpour
3	FW	IRI	Sasan Ansari (Captain)
5	DF	IRI	Amin Saedi ^{U25}
6	MF	IRI	Omid Hamedifar
7	FW	IRI	Mehrdad Mohammadi
8	MF	IRI	Milad Sarlak
9	FW	IRI	Ehsan Mahroughi
10	MF	IRI	Farshad Ahmadzadeh (vice-captain)
11	MF	IRI	Vahid Amiri
12	GK	IRI	Abolfazl Heydari ^{U23}
13	DF	IRI	Milad Badragheh
14	DF	IRI	Arman Akvan
20	MF	IRI	Yousef Mazraeh ^{U21}
21	MF	IRI	Amin Moradi ^{U23}
23	FW	IRI	Arshia Bagheri ^{U21}

No.	Pos.	Nation	Player
24	DF	IRI	Mohammad Ghoreishi
26	DF	IRI	Mohammad Ali Kazemi
27	DF	IRI	Mohammad Ali Hosseini ^{U19}
29	MF	IRI	Ghasem Latifi ^{U23}
30	DF	IRI	Arash Akbarzadeh ^{U23}
68	GK	IRI	Mohsen Forouzan
69	DF	IRI	Ramin Rezaeian
70	FW	IRI	Abolfazl Zadeh Attar ^{U21}
77	MF	IRI	Mohammadreza Keshavarzi ^{U23}
78	MF	IRI	Amir Hossein Jolani ^{U25}
80	DF	IRI	Abbas Rafie ^{U19}
88	MF	IRI	Sobhan Azizi
81	GK	IRI	Hamed Lak
90	FW	IRI	Seyed Ali Hosseini

=== Out on loan ===
Note: Flags indicate national team as defined under FIFA eligibility rules; some limited exceptions apply. Players may hold more than one non-FIFA nationality.

No.	Pos.	Nation	Player

== Notable players ==
=== Players on international cups ===
(South Korea) 2002 Asian Games

- (Iran) Yahya Golmohammadi
- (Iran) Jalal Kameli-Mofrad
- (Iran) Iman Mobali
- (Iran) Ali Badavi
- (Iran) Ebrahim Mirzapour

(China) 2004 AFC Asian Cup

- (Iran) Hossein Kaebi
- (Iran) Jalal Kameli-Mofrad
- (Iran) Iman Mobali
- (Iran) Ali Badavi
- (Iran) Ebrahim Mirzapour
- (Iran) Mohammad Alavi

(Germany) 2006 FIFA World Cup

- (Iran) Hossein Kaebi
- (Iran) Ebrahim Mirzapour

(Qatar) 2006 Asian Games

- (Iran) Pejman Montazeri
- (Iran) Adel Kolahkaj

(China) 2010 Asian Games

- (Iran) Arash Afshin

(Qatar) 2011 AFC Asian Cup

- (Iran) Arash Afshin
- (Iran) Reza Norouzi

(Brazil) 2014 FIFA World Cup

- (Iran) Bakhtiar Rahmani

(South Korea) 2014 Asian Games

- (Iran) Yousef Vakia

(Australia) 2015 AFC Asian Cup

- (Iran) Soroush Rafiei

(United States) 2026 FIFA World Cup

- (Iran) Ramin Rezaeian
- (Iran) Ali Nemati

== Personnel ==
=== Current technical staff ===
Name	Position
Head coach	(Iran) Hamid Motahari
Coach	
Assistant coaches	(Iran) Ahmad Alenemeh (Iran) Reza Norouzi (Iran) Mostafa Sadaqat
Goalkeeping coaches	(Brazil) Welesley Neneca
Athletic coach	(Iran) Alireza Ahmedaei
Fitness coach	(Iran) Mehrdad Bakhtiyarzadeh
Team doctor	(Iran) Akbar Moradi
Physiotherapist	(Iran) Payam Ahmadi
Masseurs	(Iran) Behnam Taghizadeh (Iran) Iman Saeedi
Media officer	(Iran) Mohsen Qobaei
Team manager	(Iran) Hamidreza Garshasbi

- Last updated: 2025
- Source: Coaching staff

=== Management ===
Position	Staff
President	Hamidreza Garshasbi
Board of Directors	Mansour Ghanbarzadeh
Board of Directors	Massoud Rezaian
Board of Directors	Morteza Khakbazan
Board of Directors	Mehdi Amini

- Last updated: 2025 Dsamber 18
- Source: Board of Directors

== Recent seasons ==
Note:
The table below displays the statistics and performance of the Foolad team since 1368 [1989/1990]—the year the top professional football league in Iran was established. Since its inception, Foolad has competed at the highest professional level of Iranian football.

Foolad Khuzestan Football Club was founded in 1970.

Year	Division	Position	Hazfi Cup	ACL
1989–90	Qods League	1st	Not held	did not qualify
1990–91	Provincial	1st	Not held	did not qualify
1991–92	1991–92 Azadegan League	5th	Not held	did not qualify
1992–93	1992–93 Azadegan League	5st	Not held	did not qualify
1993–94	1993–94 Azadegan League	3st	Not held	did not qualify
1994–95	1994–95 Azadegan League	5st	Not held	did not qualify
1995–96	1995–96 Azadegan League	13th	Not held	did not qualify
1996–97	Iran 1nd Division	2rd	Not held	did not qualify
1997–98	Azadegan League	10th	Not held	did not qualify
1998–99	Azadegan League	7th	Not held	did not qualify
1999–00	Azadegan League	10th	Not held	did not qualify
2000–01	Azadegan League	8th	1/8 Final	did not qualify
2001–02	Pro League	3rd	Quarter-final	did not qualify
2002–03	Pro League	7th	1/8 Final	did not qualify
2003–04	Pro League	3rd	1/8 Final	
2004–05	Pro League	1st	1/16 Final	
2005–06	Pro League	8th	1/16 Final	Group Stage
2006–07	Pro League	15th	1/8 Final	did not qualify
2007–08	Azadegan League	1st	Semi-final	did not qualify
2008–09	Pro League	7th	Quarter-final	did not qualify
2009–10	Pro League	10th	1/16 Final	did not qualify
2010–11	Pro League	6th	Semi-final	did not qualify
2011–12	Pro League	14th	Quarter-final	did not qualify
2012–13	Pro League	4th	1/16 Final	did not qualify
2013–14	Pro League	1st	Semi-final	Round of 16
2014–15	Pro League	5th	Round of 32	Group Stage
2015–16	Pro League	12th	Round of 16	did not qualify
2016–17	Pro League	10th	Round of 16	did not qualify
2017–18	Pro League	7th	Round of 32	did not qualify
2018–19	Pro League	8th	Round of 8	did not qualify
2019–20	Pro League	3rd	Round of 32	did not qualify
2020–21	Pro League	6th	Champions	Group Stage
2021–22	Pro League	5th	Round of 16	Round of 16
2022–23	Pro League	7th	Round of 16	Quarter-final

== Stadium information ==
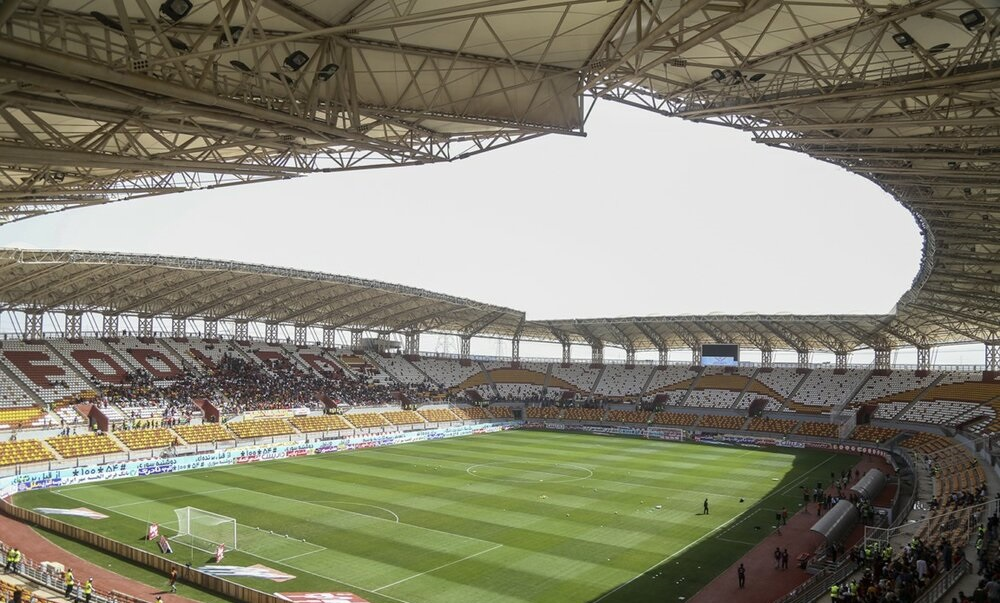
Foolad Arena

The club plays their home games at the newly built 30,655-seat Foolad Arena in northern Ahvaz since 2019. Before this, the club played originally at the Takhti Stadium until 2012 and Ghadir Stadium from 2012 until 2019.

== Honours ==
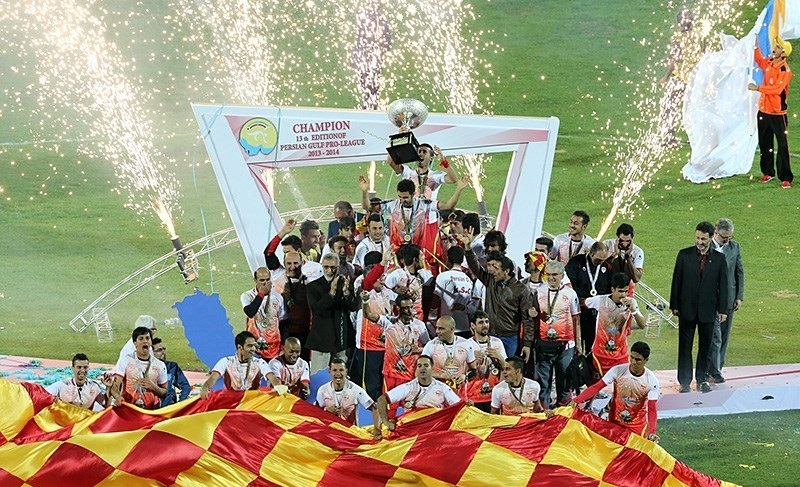
Foolad, champion of the Premier League 2013–14

=== Official Titles ===
Best Football Team of the Year in Iran:

2004–05

2013–14

Best Football Club in Iran:

Best Football Club in Iran 1405

- Pro League

(gold) Champion: 2004–05
(gold) Champion: 2013–14
(silver) Runner-up: 1996–97
(bronze) Third Place: 1993–94
(bronze) Third Place: 2001–02
(bronze) Third Place: 2003–04
(bronze) Third Place: 2019–20

- Iranian Hazfi Cup

(gold) Champion: 2020–21
(silver) Runner-up: 1993–94
(silver) Runner-up: 1996–97

- Iranian Super Cup

(gold) Champion: 2021
(gold) The Super Cup final was not held in 2014, but the title was awarded
(silver) Runner-up (1): 2005

- Provincial Leagues

(gold) Champion: 1960s–1970s
(gold) Champion: 1960s–1970s
(gold) Champion: 1960s–1970s
(gold) Champion: 1960s–1970s
(gold) Champion: 1960s–1970s
(gold) Champion: 1960s–1970s
(gold) Champion: 1970s–1990s
(gold) Champion: 1970s–1990s
(gold) Champion: 1970s–1990s

=== Domestic ===
- Persian Gulf Pro League:
  - Winners (2): 2004–05, 2013–14
- Hazfi Cup:
  - Winners (1): 2020–21
- Iranian Super Cup:
  - Winners (1): 2021

== Records and statistics ==
=== All Top scorers ===
As of 31 May 2025

#	Name	Goals	Position
1	Luciano Pereira	76	Forward
2	Sasan Ansari	53	Forward
3	Reza Norouzi	36	Forward
4	Bakhtiar Rahmani	30	Midfielder
5	Arash Afshin	29	Forward
6	Iman Mobali	26	Midfielder
7	Esmaeil Sharifat	24	Midfielder
8	Behnam Seraj	21	Forward
9	Ahmad Momenzadeh	18	Forward
10	Ayanda Patosi	18	Midfielder

=== All Top Appearances ===
#	Name	Apps	Position
1	Sasan Ansari	414	Forward
2	Ayoub Vali	253	Defender
3	Luciano Pereira	224	Forward
4	Bakhtiar Rahmani	209	Midfielder
5	Esmaeil Sharifat	191	Winger
6	Ebrahim Mirzapour	179	Goalkeeper
7	Mehrdad Jama'ati	174	Left back
8	Abdollah Karami	160	Defender
9	Ahmad Abdollahzadeh	155	Midfielder
10	Mojtaba Najjarian	154	Defender

== See also ==
- Foolad B
- Foolad C
- Hafari Ahvaz F.C.
