= 2012 AFC U-19 Championship squads =

The 2012 AFC U-19 Championship was an international under-19 age group football tournament held in United Arab Emirates from 3 – 17 November 2012. The sixteen national teams involved in the tournament were required to register a squad of maximum 23 players; only players in these squads were eligible to take part in the tournament.

The age listed for each player is on 3 November 2012, the first day of the tournament. The nationality for each club reflects the national association (not the league) to which the club is affiliated. A flag is included for coaches that are of a different nationality than their own national team. Players in boldface have been capped at full international level at some point in their career.

== Group A ==
=== United Arab Emirates ===
Head coach: Eid Baroot

No.	Pos.	Player	Date of birth (age)	Club
1	GK	**Ahmed Shambih**	10 December 1993 (aged 18)	(United Arab Emirates Football Association) Al-Nasr
2	DF	Khalid Tariq	6 January 1993 (aged 19)	(United Arab Emirates Football Association) Al-Ahli
3	DF	Amer Helal		(United Arab Emirates Football Association) Al-Ain
4	DF	**Salem Sultan**	9 May 1993 (aged 19)	(United Arab Emirates Football Association) Al-Ain
5	DF	Saif Khalfan	31 January 1993 (aged 19)	(United Arab Emirates Football Association) Al-Jazira
6	DF	Abdurahman Yousef	28 August 1993 (aged 19)	(United Arab Emirates Football Association) Al-Ahli
7	FW	Walid Amber	11 January 1993 (aged 19)	(United Arab Emirates Football Association) Emirates
8	DF	Mohammed Sebil	12 April 1993 (aged 19)	(United Arab Emirates Football Association) Al-Nasr
9	FW	Yousef Ahmed	27 April 1994 (aged 18)	(United Arab Emirates Football Association) Al-Ain
10	MF	**Ahmed Barman**	5 February 1994 (aged 18)	(United Arab Emirates Football Association) Al-Ain
11	FW	**Saif Rashid**	25 November 1994 (aged 17)	(United Arab Emirates Football Association) Sharjah
12	FW	Faraj Jumaa	6 September 1993 (aged 19)	(United Arab Emirates Football Association) Al-Ain
13	MF	Rashed Jalal	8 December 1994 (aged 17)	(United Arab Emirates Football Association) Al-Nasr
14	MF	**Salem Rashid**	21 December 1993 (aged 18)	(United Arab Emirates Football Association) Al-Jazira
15	DF	**Abdullah Al-Naqbi**	28 April 1993 (aged 19)	(United Arab Emirates Football Association) Al Dhafra
16	MF	Salem Ali	27 September 1993 (aged 19)	(United Arab Emirates Football Association) Al-Jazira
17	GK	Mohamed Al-Naqbi	3 March 1993 (aged 19)	(United Arab Emirates Football Association) Al-Wahda
18	MF	Khamis Al-Zaabi	19 December 1993 (aged 18)	(United Arab Emirates Football Association) Al-Wahda
19	MF	Muhain Khalifah	10 June 1994 (aged 18)	(United Arab Emirates Football Association) Sharjah
20	FW	**Yousif Saeed**	4 September 1994 (aged 18)	(United Arab Emirates Football Association) Sharjah
21	MF	Hamad Ibrahim	18 January 1994 (aged 18)	(United Arab Emirates Football Association) Sharjah
22	GK	Hassan Hamza	10 November 1994 (aged 17)	(United Arab Emirates Football Association) Al-Shabab
23	FW	Khaled Darwish		(United Arab Emirates Football Association) Al-Jazira

=== Japan ===
Head coach: Yasushi Yoshida

The final squad was announced on 18 October 2012.

No.	Pos.	Player	Date of birth (age)	Club
1	GK	Masatoshi Kushibiki	29 January 1993 (aged 19)	(Japan Football Association) Shimizu S-Pulse
2	DF	Ken Matsubara	16 February 1993 (aged 19)	(Japan Football Association) Oita Trinita
3	DF	**Wataru Endo**	3 January 1993 (aged 19)	(Japan Football Association) Shonan Bellmare
4	DF	Tatsuki Nara	19 September 1993 (aged 19)	(Japan Football Association) Consadole Sapporo
5	DF	Takuya Iwanami	18 June 1994 (aged 18)	(Japan Football Association) Vissel Kobe
6	DF	**Ryosuke Yamanaka**	20 April 1993 (aged 19)	(Japan Football Association) Kashiwa Reysol
7	MF	Andrew Kumagai	6 June 1993 (aged 19)	(Japan Football Association) Yokohama F. Marinos
8	MF	Gakuto Notsuda	6 June 1994 (aged 18)	(Japan Football Association) Sanfrecce Hiroshima
9	FW	**Yuya Kubo**	24 December 1993 (aged 18)	(Japan Football Association) Kyoto Sanga
10	MF	**Ryota Oshima**	23 January 1993 (aged 19)	(Japan Football Association) Kawasaki Frontale
11	FW	Daiki Watari	25 June 1993 (aged 19)	(Japan Football Association) Giravanz Kitakyushu
12	GK	Daichi Sugimoto	15 July 1993 (aged 19)	(Japan Football Association) Kyoto Sanga
13	MF	Shinya Yajima	18 January 1994 (aged 18)	(Japan Football Association) Urawa Red Diamonds
14	MF	**Kento Hashimoto**	16 August 1993 (aged 19)	(Japan Football Association) FC Tokyo
15	DF	**Naomichi Ueda**	24 October 1994 (aged 18)	(Japan Football Association) Ozu High School
16	MF	Masaya Matsumoto	25 January 1995 (aged 17)	(Japan Football Association) JFA Academy Fukushima
17	MF	Ryota Tanabe	10 April 1993 (aged 19)	(Japan Football Association) Nagoya Grampus
18	DF	Naoki Kawaguchi	24 May 1994 (aged 18)	(Japan Football Association) Albirex Niigata
19	FW	Kosuke Onose	22 April 1993 (aged 19)	(Japan Football Association) Yokohama FC
20	DF	Kazuki Sato	18 May 1993 (aged 19)	(Japan Football Association) Nagoya Grampus
21	FW	Koya Kazama	16 April 1993 (aged 19)	(Japan Football Association) Kawasaki Frontale
22	FW	Shota Sakaki	3 August 1993 (aged 19)	(Japan Football Association) Consadole Sapporo
23	GK	Shota Ikemura	17 June 1993 (aged 19)	(Japan Football Association) Kanagawa University

=== Iran ===
Head coach: Akbar Mohammadi

No.	Pos.	Player	Date of birth (age)	Club
1	GK	Hojjat Sedghi	7 February 1993 (aged 19)	(Football Federation Islamic Republic of Iran) Mes Kerman
2	DF	Yousef Vakia	30 September 1993 (aged 19)	(Football Federation Islamic Republic of Iran) Foolad
3	DF	Vahid Heydarieh	3 January 1993 (aged 19)	(Football Federation Islamic Republic of Iran) Paykan
4	DF	**Roozbeh Cheshmi**	24 July 1993 (aged 19)	(Football Federation Islamic Republic of Iran) Moghavemat
5	DF	**Hossein Kanaani**	23 March 1994 (aged 18)	(Football Federation Islamic Republic of Iran) Persepolis
6	MF	**Ahmad Abdollahzadeh**	6 May 1993 (aged 19)	(Football Federation Islamic Republic of Iran) Foolad
7	MF	Amin Jahan Kohan	7 March 1993 (aged 19)	(Football Federation Islamic Republic of Iran) Foolad
8	MF	Farshid Esmaeili	23 February 1994 (aged 18)	(Football Federation Islamic Republic of Iran) Fajr Sepasi
9	MF	**Alireza Jahanbakhsh** (c)	11 August 1993 (aged 19)	(Football Federation Islamic Republic of Iran) Damash
10	FW	Behnam Barzay	11 February 1993 (aged 19)	(Football Federation Islamic Republic of Iran) Sanat Naft
11	FW	**Sardar Azmoun**	1 January 1995 (aged 17)	(Football Federation Islamic Republic of Iran) Sepahan
12	GK	Ali Mohsenzadeh	14 February 1993 (aged 19)	(Football Federation Islamic Republic of Iran) Moghavemat
13	DF	Hossein Heydari	11 September 1993 (aged 19)	(Football Federation Islamic Republic of Iran) Mes Kerman
14	DF	Mohammad Hossein Moradmand	22 June 1993 (aged 19)	(Football Federation Islamic Republic of Iran) Sepahan
15	MF	Mohammad Daneshgar	20 January 1994 (aged 18)	(Football Federation Islamic Republic of Iran) Fajr Sepasi
16	DF	Mohammad Ali Faramarzi	1 January 1994 (aged 18)	(Football Federation Islamic Republic of Iran) Fajr Sepasi
17	FW	Ali Choupani	26 April 1993 (aged 19)	(Football Federation Islamic Republic of Iran) Sepahan
18	MF	**Ehsan Pahlevan**	25 July 1993 (aged 19)	(Football Federation Islamic Republic of Iran) Gostaresh Foolad
19	FW	Farshad Morad Karimi	1 February 1994 (aged 18)	(Football Federation Islamic Republic of Iran) Mes Kerman
20	MF	Valid Mashaeizadeh	10 January 1993 (aged 19)	(Football Federation Islamic Republic of Iran) Foolad
21	MF	Hossein Fazeli	11 June 1993 (aged 19)	(Football Federation Islamic Republic of Iran) Sepahan
22	GK	Mohammad Nasseri	18 April 1993 (aged 19)	(Football Federation Islamic Republic of Iran) Sepahan

=== Kuwait ===
Head coach: Mubarak Al-Meseb

No.	Pos.	Player	Date of birth (age)	Club
1	GK	Naief Al-Azmi		(Kuwait Football Association)
2	DF	Saud Al-Tourki		(Kuwait Football Association)
3	DF	**Ali Ateeq**	3 June 1994 (aged 18)	(Kuwait Football Association) Al-Sahel
4	MF	Mohammad Al-Bathali	29 May 1993 (aged 19)	(Kuwait Football Association) Al-Kuwait
5	DF	Nader Al-Enezi	19 January 1994 (aged 18)	(Kuwait Football Association) Al-Sahel
6	DF	Abdulaziz Husain		(Kuwait Football Association)
7	MF	**Shaheen Al Khamees**	9 July 1993 (aged 19)	(Kuwait Football Association) Al-Kuwait
8	MF	Meshari Al-Obaidan		(Kuwait Football Association) Al-Yarmouk
9	FW	**Abdul Rahman Al Shammari**	13 February 1993 (aged 19)	(Kuwait Football Association) Al-Nasr
10	FW	**Yaqoub Al-Tararwa**	7 March 1994 (aged 18)	(Kuwait Football Association) Al-Kuwait
11	MF	Mohammad Al-Qabandi		(Kuwait Football Association) Al-Tadhamon
12	DF	**Sami Al-Sanea**	9 January 1993 (aged 19)	(Kuwait Football Association) Al-Kuwait
13	MF	Nawaf Al-Emtairat		(Kuwait Football Association)
14	MF	Marzouq Al-Jadaan	23 November 1993 (aged 18)	(Kuwait Football Association) Al-Tadhamon
15	MF	Fahad Al-Hamdan	18 September 1993 (aged 19)	(Kuwait Football Association) Al-Yarmouk
16	DF	**Abdullah Al-Rashidi**	28 November 1995 (aged 16)	(Kuwait Football Association) Al-Qadsia
17	DF	Hussain Al-Harbi	3 March 1993 (aged 19)	(Kuwait Football Association) Al-Kuwait
18	FW	Mohammad Al-Fahad	29 January 1994 (aged 18)	(Kuwait Football Association) Al-Qadsia
19	FW	Mohammad Al-Enezi	27 December 1993 (aged 18)	(Kuwait Football Association) Al-Kuwait
20	MF	Omar Al-Mutairi		(Kuwait Football Association)
21	DF	**Faisal Saeed**	16 June 1994 (aged 18)	(Kuwait Football Association) Al-Qadsia
22	GK	Khalifah Al-Dhufairi		(Kuwait Football Association) Al-Kuwait
23	GK	Fahad Rashed		(Kuwait Football Association)

== Group B ==
=== South Korea ===
Head coach: Lee Kwang-Jong

The final squad was announced on 24 October 2012.

No.	Pos.	Player	Date of birth (age)	Club
1	GK	Lee Chang-keun (Captain)	30 August 1993 (aged 19)	(Korea Football Association) Busan IPark
2	DF	Sim Sang-min	21 May 1993 (aged 19)	(Korea Football Association) Chung-Ang University
3	DF	Ryu Jae-moon	8 November 1993 (aged 18)	(Korea Football Association) Yeungnam University
4	DF	Yeon Jei-min	28 May 1993 (aged 19)	(Korea Football Association) Hannam University
5	DF	Woo Joo-sung	8 June 1993 (aged 19)	(Korea Football Association) Chung-Ang University
6	MF	Kim Sun-woo	19 April 1993 (aged 19)	(Korea Football Association) University of Ulsan
7	FW	Ryu Seung-woo	17 December 1993 (aged 18)	(Korea Football Association) Chung-Ang University
8	MF	Oh Young-joon	16 January 1993 (aged 19)	(Korea Football Association) Hanyang University
9	FW	Kim Hyun	3 May 1993 (aged 19)	(Korea Football Association) Jeonbuk Hyundai Motors
10	FW	Moon Chang-jin	12 July 1993 (aged 19)	(Korea Football Association) Pohang Steelers
11	MF	Kang Sang-woo	17 October 1993 (aged 19)	(Korea Football Association) Kyung Hee University
12	DF	Gang Yoon-goo	8 February 1993 (aged 19)	(Korea Football Association) Dong-A University
13	DF	**Lee Chang-min**	20 January 1994 (aged 18)	(Korea Football Association) Bukyeong High School
14	DF	**Song Ju-hun**	13 January 1994 (aged 18)	(Korea Football Association) Gwangmyoung Technical High School
15	DF	Jung Hyun-cheol	26 April 1993 (aged 19)	(Korea Football Association) Dongguk University
16	MF	Lee Gwang-hoon	26 November 1993 (aged 18)	(Korea Football Association) Pohang Steelers
17	MF	Kim Seung-jun	11 September 1994 (aged 18)	(Korea Football Association) Gunsan Jeil High School
18	FW	Sung Bong-jae	29 April 1993 (aged 19)	(Korea Football Association) Dongguk University
19	MF	**Kwon Chang-hoon**	30 June 1994 (aged 18)	(Korea Football Association) Suwon Samsung Bluewings U-18
20	MF	Kwak Sung-wook	12 July 1993 (aged 19)	(Korea Football Association) Ajou University
21	GK	Ham Seok-min	14 February 1994 (aged 18)	(Korea Football Association) Soongsil University
22	MF	**Heo Yong-joon**	8 January 1993 (aged 19)	(Korea Football Association) Korea University
23	GK	Lee Ki-hyun	16 December 1993 (aged 18)	(Korea Football Association) Dongguk University

=== China PR ===
Head coach: (Netherlands) Jan Olde Riekerink

The final squad was announced on 18 October 2012.

No.	Pos.	Player	Date of birth (age)	Club
1	GK	Fang Jingqi	17 January 1993 (aged 19)	(Chinese Football Association) Dongguan
2	DF	Sun Zheng'ao	8 March 1994 (aged 18)	(Chinese Football Association) Hangzhou Greentown
3	DF	**Sun Guowen**	30 September 1993 (aged 19)	(Chinese Football Association) Dalian Shide
4	DF	Li Songyi	27 January 1993 (aged 19)	(Chinese Football Association) Shandong Luneng
5	DF	Wu Hang	1 February 1993 (aged 19)	(Chinese Football Association) Hangzhou Greentown
6	MF	**Chen Zhongliu**	30 September 1993 (aged 19)	(Chinese Football Association) Hangzhou Greentown
7	MF	**Liu Binbin**	16 June 1993 (aged 19)	(Chinese Football Association) Shandong Luneng
8	DF	**Wang Tong**	12 February 1993 (aged 19)	(Chinese Football Association) Shandong Luneng
9	FW	Shen Tianfeng	18 March 1994 (aged 18)	(Chinese Football Association) Guizhou Renhe
10	MF	**Xie Pengfei**	29 June 1993 (aged 19)	(Chinese Football Association) Hangzhou Greentown
11	FW	**Wu Xinghan**	24 February 1993 (aged 19)	(Chinese Football Association) Shandong Luneng
12	GK	Zou Dehai	27 February 1993 (aged 19)	(Chinese Football Association) Hangzhou Greentown
13	DF	Hu Bowen	20 January 1994 (aged 18)	(Chinese Football Association) Shanghai Zobon
14	DF	**He Guan**	25 January 1993 (aged 19)	(Chinese Football Association) Shanghai Zobon
15	DF	Jiang Weipeng	3 January 1993 (aged 19)	(Chinese Football Association) Tianjin TEDA
16	MF	Xu Xin	19 April 1994 (aged 18)	(Royal Spanish Football Federation) Atlético Madrid
17	MF	Wang Jianan	31 May 1993 (aged 19)	(Chinese Football Association) Henan Jianye
18	MF	Wang Xinhui	2 January 1993 (aged 19)	(Chinese Football Association) Guangdong Youth
19	MF	Luo Senwen	16 January 1993 (aged 19)	(Chinese Football Association) Shandong Luneng
20	DF	Guo Hao	14 January 1993 (aged 19)	(Chinese Football Association) Tianjin TEDA
21	GK	Xu Jiamin	11 April 1994 (aged 18)	(Chinese Football Association) Shanghai Zobon
22	MF	**Feng Gang**	6 March 1993 (aged 19)	(Chinese Football Association) Hangzhou Greentown
23	FW	Chen Hao	28 January 1993 (aged 19)	(Chinese Football Association) Shandong Luneng

=== Thailand ===
Head coach: Arjhan Srong-ngamsub

The final squad was announced on 19 October 2012.

No.	Pos.	Player	Date of birth (age)	Club
1	GK	Watchara Buathong	20 April 1993 (aged 19)	(Football Association of Thailand) Port Authority
2	DF	Thanakorn Saipunya	5 April 1993 (aged 19)	(Football Association of Thailand) BEC Tero Sasana
3	MF	**Tanaboon Kesarat**	21 September 1993 (aged 19)	(Football Association of Thailand) BEC Tero Sasana
4	DF	**Weerawut Kayem**	23 March 1993 (aged 19)	(Football Association of Thailand) Muangthong United
5	MF	Itthipol Yodprom	25 May 1994 (aged 18)	(Football Association of Thailand) Osotspa Saraburi
6	MF	**Chanathip Songkrasin**	5 October 1993 (aged 19)	(Football Association of Thailand) BEC Tero Sasana
7	MF	**Thitiphan Puangjan**	1 September 1993 (aged 19)	(Football Association of Thailand) Muangthong United
8	MF	Athit Wisetsilp	26 September 1993 (aged 19)	(Football Association of Thailand) Osotspa Saraburi
9	FW	**Pakorn Prempak**	2 February 1993 (aged 19)	(Football Association of Thailand) Police United
10	MF	Tanasith Siripala	9 August 1995 (aged 17)	(Football Association of Thailand) Bangkok Glass
11	FW	Jaturong Pimkoon	3 September 1993 (aged 19)	(Football Association of Thailand) RBAC
12	MF	Narakorn Khana	7 April 1993 (aged 19)	(Football Association of Thailand) Sriracha
13	MF	**Narubadin Weerawatnodom**	12 July 1994 (aged 18)	(Football Association of Thailand) BEC Tero Sasana
14	FW	Aekkaphop Saensra	8 February 1994 (aged 18)	(Football Association of Thailand) Bangkok Glass
15	DF	**Adisorn Promrak**	21 October 1993 (aged 19)	(Football Association of Thailand) Army United
16	DF	**Peerapat Notchaiya**	4 February 1993 (aged 19)	(Football Association of Thailand) BEC Tero Sasana
17	MF	**Nitipong Selanon**	25 May 1993 (aged 19)	(Football Association of Thailand) Saraburi
18	GK	Somporn Yos	23 June 1993 (aged 19)	(Football Association of Thailand) RBAC
19	MF	Woranat Thongkruea	28 March 1993 (aged 19)	(Football Association of Thailand) Nakhon Ratchasima
20	MF	Adisak Klinkosoom	18 August 1993 (aged 19)	(Football Association of Thailand) Port Authority
21	DF	Suwannapat Kingkaew	10 June 1994 (aged 18)	(Football Association of Thailand) Rangsit
22	GK	Prapat Yoskrai	30 July 1993 (aged 19)	(Football Association of Thailand) Osotspa Saraburi
23	FW	Kittisak Hochin	19 January 1994 (aged 18)	(Football Association of Thailand) Assumption United

=== Iraq ===
Head coach: Hakeem Shaker

No.	Pos.	Player	Date of birth (age)	Caps	Goals	Club
1	GK	Saqr Ajail	3 January 1993 (aged 19)	3	0	(Iraq Football Association) Baghdad
2	DF	**Mustafa Nadhim**	23 September 1993 (aged 19)	3	0	(Iraq Football Association) Najaf
3	DF	**Ali Adnan**	19 December 1993 (aged 18)	2	1	(Iraq Football Association) Baghdad
4	DF	Ammar Kadhim	2 December 1993 (aged 18)	4	2	(Iraq Football Association) Al-Sinaa
5	DF	**Ali Faez**	9 September 1994 (aged 18)	1	0	(Iraq Football Association) Al-Talaba
6	MF	**Saif Salman**	1 July 1993 (aged 19)	3	0	(Iraq Football Association) Duhok
7	MF	**Jawad Kadhim**	14 October 1994 (aged 18)	2	1	(Iraq Football Association) Duhok
8	FW	Farhan Shakor	15 October 1995 (aged 17)	0	0	(Iraq Football Association) Sulaymaniya
9	MF	**Ahmad Abbas**	9 May 1994 (aged 18)	3	0	(Iraq Football Association) Naft Al-Janoob
10	FW	**Mohammed Jabbar Shokan**	21 May 1993 (aged 19)	2	3	(Iraq Football Association) Erbil
11	MF	**Humam Tariq**	10 February 1996 (aged 16)	0	0	(Iraq Football Association) Al-Quwa Al-Jawiya
12	DF	**Mohammed Jabbar Rubat**	29 June 1993 (aged 19)	3	0	(Iraq Football Association) Al-Minaa
13	FW	**Ali Qasim**	20 January 1994 (aged 18)	3	3	(Iraq Football Association) Al-Zawraa
14	DF	Ridha Nassrullah	1 January 1994 (aged 18)	0	0	(Iraq Football Association) Al-Sinaa
15	DF	Zeyad Tariq	19 December 1994 (aged 17)	0	0	(Iraq Football Association) Baghdad
16	FW	**Mohannad Abdul-Raheem**	22 September 1993 (aged 19)	3	3	(Iraq Football Association) Duhok
17	MF	**Ammar Abdul-Hussein**	13 February 1993 (aged 19)	0	0	(Iraq Football Association) Erbil
18	MF	Ahmad Abdul-Ameer	21 October 1994 (aged 18)	2	0	(Iraq Football Association) Al-Quwa Al-Jawiya
19	MF	**Mahdi Kamil**	6 January 1995 (aged 17)	4	2	(Iraq Football Association) Al-Shorta
20	MF	Haidar Khudair	2 February 1994 (aged 18)	0	0	(Iraq Football Association) Al-Talaba
21	MF	Ihab Kadhim	1 January 1994 (aged 18)	0	0	(Iraq Football Association) Al-Talaba
22	GK	Ali Yasin	9 August 1993 (aged 19)	0	0	(Iraq Football Association) Karbalaa
23	GK	**Mohammed Hameed**	24 January 1993 (aged 19)	0	0	(Iraq Football Association) Al-Shorta

== Group C ==
=== North Korea ===
Head coach: An Ye-gun

No.	Pos.	Player	Date of birth (age)	Club
1	GK	An Kang-chol	1 November 1994 (aged 18)	(DPR Korea Football Association)
2	DF	**Jong Kwang-sok**	5 January 1994 (aged 18)	(DPR Korea Football Association) Chobyong
3	DF	Choe Chol-ryong	29 January 1994 (aged 18)	(DPR Korea Football Association) Ryomyong
4	DF	**Ryu Kwang-ho**	20 October 1993 (aged 19)	(DPR Korea Football Association) Hwaebul
5	DF	**Jang Kuk-chol**	16 February 1994 (aged 18)	(DPR Korea Football Association) Rimyongsu
6	DF	**Hong Jin-song**	20 February 1994 (aged 18)	(DPR Korea Football Association)
7	MF	Kang Nam-gwon	6 March 1995 (aged 17)	(DPR Korea Football Association) Chobyong
8	FW	**Ju Jong-chol**	20 October 1994 (aged 18)	(DPR Korea Football Association) Amnokgang
9	FW	**Jang Ok-chol**	14 January 1994 (aged 18)	(DPR Korea Football Association) Kigwancha
10	MF	**Pak Song-il**	14 May 1993 (aged 19)	(DPR Korea Football Association)
11	MF	**Kwon Chung-hyok**	21 January 1994 (aged 18)	(DPR Korea Football Association) April 25
12	MF	Ri Ji-song	1 May 1994 (aged 18)	(DPR Korea Football Association)
13	FW	Kim Kuk-chol	13 January 1995 (aged 17)	(DPR Korea Football Association) Hwaebul
14	FW	Sin Chung-song		(DPR Korea Football Association)
15	FW	**Jo Kwang**	5 August 1994 (aged 18)	(DPR Korea Football Association) Sobaeksu
16	MF	**Pak Myong-song**	31 March 1994 (aged 18)	(DPR Korea Football Association) Sobaeksu
17	MF	**Kim Chol-bom**	16 July 1994 (aged 18)	(DPR Korea Football Association) Sobaeksu
18	GK	Cha Jong-hun	19 April 1995 (aged 17)	(DPR Korea Football Association) Pyongyang City
19	FW	So Jong-hyok	1 July 1995 (aged 17)	(DPR Korea Football Association) April 25
20	MF	**So Kyong-jin**	8 January 1994 (aged 18)	(DPR Korea Football Association) South Hamgyong
21	GK	Han Song-hwan	2 March 1993 (aged 19)	(DPR Korea Football Association) Amnokgang
22	FW	**Kim Ju-song**	15 October 1993 (aged 19)	(DPR Korea Football Association) April 25

=== Uzbekistan ===
Head coach: Ahmadjon Musaev

The final squad was announced on 29 October 2012.

No.	Pos.	Player	Date of birth (age)	Club
1	GK	Asilbek Omonov	1 September 1993 (aged 19)	(Uzbekistan Football Association) Pakhtakor
2	DF	**Tohirjon Shamshitdinov**	9 February 1993 (aged 19)	(Uzbekistan Football Association) Pakhtakor
3	DF	**Sardor Rakhmanov**	9 July 1994 (aged 18)	(Uzbekistan Football Association) Mash'al Mubarek
4	DF	**Boburbek Yuldashov**	8 April 1993 (aged 19)	(Uzbekistan Football Association) Lokomotiv Tashkent
5	DF	**Maksimilian Fomin**	21 September 1993 (aged 19)	(Uzbekistan Football Association) Pakhtakor
6	MF	**Abbosbek Makhstaliev**	12 January 1994 (aged 18)	(Uzbekistan Football Association) Pakhtakor
7	MF	**Vladimir Kozak**	12 June 1993 (aged 19)	(Uzbekistan Football Association) Pakhtakor
8	MF	**Abdulloh Olimov**	11 February 1993 (aged 19)	(Uzbekistan Football Association) Pakhtakor
9	FW	**Jahongir Abdumuminov**	9 February 1993 (aged 19)	(Uzbekistan Football Association) Mash'al Mubarek
10	MF	**Jamshid Iskanderov**	16 October 1993 (aged 19)	(Uzbekistan Football Association) Pakhtakor
11	FW	Abdulaziz Yusupov	5 January 1993 (aged 19)	(Uzbekistan Football Association) Pakhtakor
12	GK	**Akmal Tursunbaev**	14 April 1993 (aged 19)	(Uzbekistan Football Association) Bunyodkor
13	MF	Sergey Rekun	6 February 1993 (aged 19)	(Uzbekistan Football Association) Pakhtakor
14	DF	Javlon Mirabdullaev	19 March 1994 (aged 18)	(Uzbekistan Football Association) Bunyodkor
15	FW	Timur Khakimov	23 August 1994 (aged 18)	(Uzbekistan Football Association) Pakhtakor
16	MF	Azizbek Muratov	21 January 1994 (aged 18)	(Uzbekistan Football Association) FK Buxoro
17	MF	**Igor Sergeev**	30 April 1993 (aged 19)	(Uzbekistan Football Association) Pakhtakor
18	MF	**Sardor Sabirkhodjaev**	6 November 1994 (aged 17)	(Uzbekistan Football Association) Bunyodkor
19	FW	**Zabikhillo Urinboev**	30 March 1995 (aged 17)	(Uzbekistan Football Association) Bunyodkor
20	MF	Ihtiyor Tashpulatov	4 March 1993 (aged 19)	(Uzbekistan Football Association) Mash'al Mubarek
21	GK	Bakhodir Mirsoatov	21 October 1993 (aged 19)	(Uzbekistan Football Association) Pakhtakor
22	MF	**Muhsinjon Ubaydullaev**	15 July 1994 (aged 18)	(Uzbekistan Football Association) Pakhtakor
23	DF	Jaloliddin Saidov	26 January 1993 (aged 19)	(Uzbekistan Football Association) Pakhtakor

=== Vietnam ===
Head coach: Mai Đức Chung

The final squad was announced on 25 October 2012.

No.	Pos.	Player	Date of birth (age)	Club
1	GK	Nguyễn Sơn Hải	6 May 1994 (aged 18)	(Vietnam Football Federation) Dong Thap
2	DF	**Nguyễn Thanh Hiền**	16 April 1993 (aged 19)	(Vietnam Football Federation) Dong Thap
4	DF	Đào Duy Khánh	30 January 1994 (aged 18)	(Vietnam Football Federation) Hanoi
6	DF	**Quế Ngọc Hải**	15 May 1993 (aged 19)	(Vietnam Football Federation) Song Lam Nghe An
7	DF	Nguyễn Minh Hải	9 January 1994 (aged 18)	(Vietnam Football Federation) Hanoi
8	MF	Hồ Sỹ Sâm	2 September 1993 (aged 19)	(Vietnam Football Federation) Song Lam Nghe An
9	FW	Dương Minh Thắng		(Vietnam Football Federation) Tiền Giang
10	MF	Phan Đình Thắng	2 October 1993 (aged 19)	(Vietnam Football Federation) Hanoi
11	DF	Nguyễn Văn Đức	1 August 1993 (aged 19)	(Vietnam Football Federation) Song Lam Nghe An
12	FW	Ngô Xuân Toàn	10 February 1993 (aged 19)	(Vietnam Football Federation) Song Lam Nghe An
14	MF	**Đỗ Hùng Dũng**	8 September 1993 (aged 19)	(Vietnam Football Federation) Hanoi
15	MF	Đặng Anh Tuấn	1 August 1994 (aged 18)	(Vietnam Football Federation) Da Nang
16	MF	Nguyễn Thái Sung	22 September 1994 (aged 18)	(Vietnam Football Federation) Da Nang
17	GK	Nguyễn Trung Thu		(Vietnam Football Federation) Hoàng Anh Gia Lai
18	MF	**Võ Huy Toàn**	15 March 1993 (aged 19)	(Vietnam Football Federation) Da Nang
19	DF	Nguyễn Văn Mạnh	16 June 1993 (aged 19)	(Vietnam Football Federation) Song Lam Nghe An
20	DF	Nguyễn Sỹ Nam	15 February 1993 (aged 19)	(Vietnam Football Federation) Song Lam Nghe An
21	FW	Nguyễn Xuân Nam	18 January 1994 (aged 18)	(Vietnam Football Federation) Hanoi
22	GK	Lê Văn Nghĩa	14 June 1994 (aged 18)	(Vietnam Football Federation) Hanoi
23	MF	Cao Xuân Thắng	5 February 1993 (aged 19)	(Vietnam Football Federation) Song Lam Nghe An

=== Jordan ===
Head Coach: Jamal Abu Abed

The final squad was announced on 29 October 2012.

No.	Pos.	Player	Date of birth (age)	Club
1	GK	Noureddin Bani Ateyah	25 January 1993 (aged 19)	(Jordan Football Association) Al-Faisaly
2	DF	Yousef Al-Alousi	17 December 1993 (aged 18)	(Jordan Football Association) Al-Faisaly
3	DF	**Mohannad Khairullah**	25 July 1993 (aged 19)	(Jordan Football Association) Al-Jazeera
4	DF	**Amer Abu Hudaib**	8 August 1993 (aged 19)	(Jordan Football Association) Al-Jazeera
5	DF	Yazan Tannous		(Jordan Football Association) Al-Faisaly
6	MF	Asem Al-Qudah	6 April 1993 (aged 19)	(Jordan Football Association) Al-Jazeera
7	FW	**Fadi Awad**	26 March 1993 (aged 19)	(Jordan Football Association) Al-Jalil
8	MF	Laith Al-Bashtawi	12 March 1994 (aged 18)	(Jordan Football Association) Al-Wehdat
9	FW	Ahmad Al-Essawi	16 July 1993 (aged 19)	(Jordan Football Association) Shabab Al-Ordon
10	FW	Muath Mahmoud	18 April 1993 (aged 19)	(Jordan Football Association) Al-Karmel
11	MF	Mohammad Al-Emlah	20 February 1993 (aged 19)	(Jordan Football Association) Shabab Al-Ordon
12	GK	**Yazid Abu Layla**	6 January 1993 (aged 19)	(Jordan Football Association) Shabab Al-Ordon
13	MF	**Saleh Rateb**	18 December 1994 (aged 17)	(Jordan Football Association) Al-Wehdat
14	MF	Munther Raja	22 February 1993 (aged 19)	(Jordan Football Association) Al-Wehdat
15	DF	Ali Al-Rthoom	24 August 1993 (aged 19)	(Jordan Football Association) Al-Baqa'a
16	MF	**Samir Raja**	3 September 1994 (aged 18)	(Jordan Football Association) Al-Wehdat
17	MF	**Rajaei Ayed**	25 July 1993 (aged 19)	(Jordan Football Association) Al-Wehdat
18	MF	Omar Khalil Al-Hasani	4 February 1994 (aged 18)	(Jordan Football Association) Al-Jazeera
19	MF	**Ahmad Sariweh**	23 January 1994 (aged 18)	(Jordan Football Association) Al-Wehdat
20	DF	Khalid Salim El Abed	24 May 1993 (aged 19)	(Royal Dutch Football Association) FC Chabab
21	MF	**Feras Shelbaieh**	27 November 1993 (aged 18)	(Jordan Football Association) Al-Wehdat
22	GK	Mohammad Abunabhan	1 July 1994 (aged 18)	(Jordan Football Association) Al-Wehdat
23	FW	Bilal Qwaider	7 May 1993 (aged 19)	(Jordan Football Association) Al-Wehdat

== Group D ==
=== Australia ===
Head coach: Paul Okon

The final squad was announced on 23 October 2012.

No.	Pos.	Player	Date of birth (age)	Caps	Goals	Club
1	GK	Paul Izzo	6 January 1995 (aged 17)	1	0	(Football Australia) Adelaide United
2	DF	Joshua Brillante	25 March 1993 (aged 19)	6	1	(Football Australia) Newcastle Jets
3	DF	Connor Chapman	31 October 1994 (aged 18)	7	0	(Football Australia) Newcastle Jets
4	DF	**Curtis Good**	23 March 1993 (aged 19)	5	0	(The Football Association) Newcastle United
5	DF	Corey Brown	7 January 1994 (aged 18)	7	1	(Football Australia) Brisbane Roar
6	DF	Reece Caira	1 July 1993 (aged 19)	5	1	(Football Australia) Western Sydney Wanderers
7	FW	Corey Gameiro	1 January 1993 (aged 19)	3	0	(Royal Dutch Football Association) FC Eindhoven
8	MF	Terry Antonis	26 November 1993 (aged 18)	13	2	(Football Australia) Sydney FC
9	FW	**Adam Taggart**	2 June 1993 (aged 19)	5	4	(Football Australia) Newcastle Jets
10	MF	**Jamie Maclaren**	29 July 1993 (aged 19)	5	4	(The Football Association) Blackburn Rovers
11	MF	Ryan Edwards	17 November 1993 (aged 18)	12	1	(The Football Association) Reading
12	GK	Liam Jacob	18 August 1994 (aged 18)	1	0	(The Football Association) Oldham Athletic
13	DF	Tom King	20 July 1994 (aged 18)	2	0	(The Football Association) Bristol City
14	MF	Ryan Williams	28 October 1993 (aged 19)	1	0	(The Football Association) Fulham
15	DF	**Jason Geria**	10 May 1993 (aged 19)	8	1	(Football Australia) Brisbane Roar
16	MF	**Jackson Irvine**	7 March 1993 (aged 19)	1	0	(Scottish Football Association) Celtic
17	DF	Hayden Morton	2 March 1994 (aged 18)	5	0	(Football Australia) Central Coast Mariners
18	GK	Jack Duncan	2 November 1994 (aged 18)	2	0	(Football Australia) Newcastle Jets
19	FW	Ben Garuccio	15 June 1995 (aged 17)	1	0	(Football Australia) Melbourne Heart
20	MF	**Mustafa Amini**	20 April 1993 (aged 19)	18	3	(German Football Association) Borussia Dortmund
21	MF	Mitchell Oxborrow	18 February 1995 (aged 17)	1	0	(Football Australia) Newcastle Jets
22	DF	David Vranković	11 November 1993 (aged 18)	0	0	(Football Australia) Melbourne Heart
23	FW	Travis Cooper	21 December 1993 (aged 18)	1	0	(Royal Dutch Football Association) VVV-Venlo

=== Saudi Arabia ===
Head coach: (Spain) Sergio Piernas

The final squad was announced on 30 October 2012.

No.	Pos.	Player	Date of birth (age)	Club
1	GK	Abdullah Al-Arraf	3 June 1995 (aged 17)	(Saudi Arabian Football Federation) Al-Wehda
2	MF	Ryan Al-Mousa	24 July 1994 (aged 18)	(Saudi Arabian Football Federation) Al-Ahli
3	DF	**Abdullah Madu**	15 July 1993 (aged 19)	(Saudi Arabian Football Federation) Al-Nassr
4	DF	**Talal Al-Absi**	22 February 1993 (aged 19)	(Saudi Arabian Football Federation) Al-Ittihad
5	DF	**Saeed Al-Robeai**	4 June 1994 (aged 18)	(Saudi Arabian Football Federation) Al-Ahli
6	MF	Majed Al-Najrani	25 January 1993 (aged 19)	(Saudi Arabian Football Federation) Al-Qadsiah
7	MF	**Fahad Al-Muwallad**	14 September 1994 (aged 18)	(Saudi Arabian Football Federation) Al-Ittihad
8	MF	**Mustafa Bassas**	2 June 1993 (aged 19)	(Saudi Arabian Football Federation) Al-Ahli
9	FW	Abdulrahman Al-Ghamdi	1 November 1994 (aged 18)	(Saudi Arabian Football Federation) Al-Ittihad
10	MF	**Abdulfattah Asiri**	26 February 1994 (aged 18)	(Saudi Arabian Football Federation) Al-Ittihad
11	MF	**Saleh Al-Amri**	14 October 1993 (aged 19)	(Saudi Arabian Football Federation) Al-Qadsiah
12	GK	Ahmed Al-Rehaili	6 October 1994 (aged 18)	(Saudi Arabian Football Federation) Al-Ahli
13	DF	**Ali Al-Zubaidi**	4 January 1993 (aged 19)	(Saudi Arabian Football Federation) Al-Ettifaq
14	MF	**Mohamed Kanno**	22 September 1994 (aged 18)	(Saudi Arabian Football Federation) Al-Ettifaq
15	MF	Khalid Al-Qutam	4 November 1995 (aged 16)	(Saudi Arabian Football Federation) Al-Hilal
16	MF	**Abdulmajeed Al-Swat**	21 April 1995 (aged 17)	(Saudi Arabian Football Federation) Al-Hilal
17	FW	Ahmed Al-Shehri	4 September 1993 (aged 19)	(Saudi Arabian Football Federation) Al-Ettifaq
18	DF	Abdullah Al-Ammar	1 March 1994 (aged 18)	(Saudi Arabian Football Federation) Al-Hilal
19	FW	Saleh Al-Shehri	1 November 1993 (aged 19)	(Portuguese Football Federation) Beira-Mar
20	DF	**Mohammed Qassem**	19 January 1995 (aged 17)	(Saudi Arabian Football Federation) Al-Ittihad
21	GK	Waleed Abu Milhah	16 January 1996 (aged 16)	(Saudi Arabian Football Federation) Al-Hilal
22	MF	**Ali Hazazi**	18 February 1994 (aged 18)	(Saudi Arabian Football Federation) Al-Qadsiah
23	DF	Ammar Al-Daheem	31 August 1993 (aged 19)	(Saudi Arabian Football Federation) Al-Ettifaq
