= Football at the 2014 Asian Games – Men's team squads =

Below are the squads for the men's football tournament at the 2014 Asian Games, played in South Korea.

== Group A ==
=== Laos ===
Coach: (England) Dave Booth

No.	Pos.	Player	Date of birth (age)	Club
1	GK	Vathana Keodouangdeth	28 January 1996 (aged 18)	(Lao Football Federation) Lao Toyota
2	DF	Saynakhonevieng Phommapanya	28 October 1987 (aged 26)	(Lao Football Federation) Lao Toyota
3	DF	Khamla Pinkeo	23 November 1990 (aged 23)	(Lao Football Federation) Lao Police
4	DF	Ketsada Souksavanh	23 November 1992 (aged 21)	(Lao Football Federation) SHB Champasack
5	DF	Saychon Khunsamnam	13 January 1993 (aged 21)	(Lao Football Federation) Lao Police
6	DF	Souksadakone Liapvisay	15 January 1993 (aged 21)	(Lao Football Federation) Yotha
7	MF	Khonesavanh Sihavong	10 October 1994 (aged 19)	(Lao Football Federation) Lao Police
8	MF	Keoviengphet Liththideth	30 November 1992 (aged 21)	(Lao Football Federation) Ezra
9	FW	Sitthideth Khanthavong	2 September 1994 (aged 20)	(Lao Football Federation) Yotha
10	MF	Soukaphone Vongchiengkham	9 March 1992 (aged 22)	(Football Association of Thailand) Saraburi
11	MF	Tiny Bounmalay	6 June 1993 (aged 21)	(Lao Football Federation) Lao Police
12	MF	Phoutdavy Phommasane	2 February 1994 (aged 20)	(Lao Football Federation) Lanexang Intra
13	DF	Bounthavy Sipasong	4 July 1996 (aged 18)	(Lao Football Federation) Hoang Anh Attapeu
14	DF	Chueafong Xiong	21 April 1992 (aged 22)	(Lao Football Federation) Vientiane
15	MF	Phoutthasay Khochalern	29 December 1995 (aged 18)	(Lao Football Federation) Hoang Anh Attapeu
16	FW	Xaysongkham Champathong	19 May 1993 (aged 21)	(Lao Football Federation) Lao Army
17	MF	Vilayuth Sayyabounsou	27 November 1992 (aged 21)	(Lao Football Federation) Ezra
18	GK	Soukthavy Soundala	4 November 1995 (aged 18)	(Lao Football Federation) Ezra
19	DF	Sengdao Inthilath	3 June 1994 (aged 20)	(Lao Football Federation) Hoang Anh Attapeu
20	FW	Khampheng Sayavutthi	19 July 1986 (aged 28)	(Football Association of Thailand) Angthong

=== Malaysia ===
Coach: Ong Kim Swee

No.	Pos.	Player	Date of birth (age)	Club
1	GK	Farhan Abu Bakar	14 February 1993 (aged 21)	(Football Association of Malaysia) Harimau Muda A
3	DF	Shahrul Saad	8 July 1993 (aged 21)	(Football Association of Malaysia) Harimau Muda A
4	MF	Brendan Gan	3 June 1988 (aged 26)	(Football Association of Malaysia) Kelantan
5	MF	Ashri Chuchu	27 February 1991 (aged 23)	(Football Association of Malaysia) Sarawak
6	FW	Hazwan Bakri	19 June 1991 (aged 23)	(Football Association of Malaysia) Selangor
7	DF	Aidil Zafuan	3 August 1987 (aged 27)	(Football Association of Malaysia) Johor Darul Ta'zim
8	MF	Saiful Ridzuwan	16 March 1992 (aged 22)	(Football Association of Malaysia) Harimau Muda A
10	FW	Nor Farhan Muhammad	19 December 1984 (aged 29)	(Football Association of Malaysia) Terengganu
12	MF	Gary Steven Robbat	3 September 1992 (aged 22)	(Football Association of Malaysia) Harimau Muda A
14	MF	Amirul Hisyam Awang Kechik	5 May 1995 (aged 19)	(Football Association of Malaysia) Harimau Muda A
15	MF	Junior Eldstål	16 September 1991 (aged 23)	(Football Association of Malaysia) Sarawak
16	DF	Zubir Azmi	14 November 1991 (aged 22)	(Football Association of Malaysia) Terengganu
17	DF	Fandi Othman	25 April 1992 (aged 22)	(Football Association of Malaysia) Harimau Muda A
20	DF	Azrif Nasrulhaq	27 May 1991 (aged 23)	(Football Association of Malaysia) Harimau Muda A
21	DF	Nazirul Naim	6 April 1993 (aged 21)	(Football Association of Malaysia) Harimau Muda A
22	GK	Izham Tarmizi	24 April 1991 (aged 23)	(Football Association of Malaysia) Johor Darul Ta'zim
24	DF	Mohd Amer Saidin	25 July 1992 (aged 22)	(Football Association of Malaysia) Harimau Muda A
25	FW	Ferris Danial	21 August 1992 (aged 22)	(Football Association of Malaysia) Harimau Muda A
27	DF	Fadhli Shas	21 January 1991 (aged 23)	(Football Association of Malaysia) Johor Darul Ta'zim
31	MF	Nazmi Faiz	16 August 1994 (aged 20)	(Football Association of Malaysia) Selangor

=== Saudi Arabia ===
Coach: (Spain) Lorenzo Antolínez

No.	Pos.	Player	Date of birth (age)	Club
1	GK	Abdullah Al-Arraf	3 June 1995 (aged 19)	(Saudi Arabian Football Federation) Al-Wehda
2	DF	Mazen Ibrahim	21 June 1994 (aged 20)	(Saudi Arabian Football Federation) Al-Ahli
3	DF	Abdullah Madu	15 July 1993 (aged 21)	(Saudi Arabian Football Federation) Al-Nassr
4	DF	Abdullah Al-Hafith	25 December 1992 (aged 21)	(Saudi Arabian Football Federation) Al-Hilal
5	MF	Hussain Al-Qahtani	20 December 1994 (aged 19)	(Saudi Arabian Football Federation) Al-Hilal
6	DF	Mohammed Al-Fatil	4 January 1992 (aged 22)	(Saudi Arabian Football Federation) Al-Ahli
7	FW	Mohammed Al-Harthi	12 August 1994 (aged 20)	(Saudi Arabian Football Federation) Al-Ahli
8	FW	Raed Al-Ghamdi	6 May 1994 (aged 20)	(Saudi Arabian Football Federation) Al-Ahli
9	FW	Ahmed Al-Shehri	3 September 1993 (aged 21)	(Saudi Arabian Football Federation) Al-Ettifaq
10	MF	Abdulkareem Al-Qahtani	9 February 1993 (aged 21)	(Saudi Arabian Football Federation) Al-Hilal
11	MF	Abdulaziz Al-Bishi	11 March 1994 (aged 20)	(Saudi Arabian Football Federation) Al-Shabab
12	MF	Majed Kanabah	27 February 1993 (aged 21)	(Saudi Arabian Football Federation) Al-Ittihad
13	DF	Abdulrahman Al-Rio	15 May 1994 (aged 20)	(Saudi Arabian Football Federation) Al-Ittihad
14	DF	Ammar Al-Daheem	31 August 1993 (aged 21)	(Saudi Arabian Football Federation) Al-Ittihad
15	DF	Abdullah Al-Shamekh	28 May 1993 (aged 21)	(Saudi Arabian Football Federation) Al-Hilal
16	MF	Abdullah Otayf	3 August 1992 (aged 22)	(Saudi Arabian Football Federation) Al-Hilal
17	MF	Zakaria Sami	27 July 1992 (aged 22)	(Saudi Arabian Football Federation) Al-Ahli
18	GK	Mohammed Awaji	22 October 1994 (aged 19)	(Saudi Arabian Football Federation) Al-Shabab
19	FW	Saleh Al-Shehri	1 November 1993 (aged 20)	(Saudi Arabian Football Federation) Al-Ahli
20	GK	Abdulrahman Al-Thabit	17 July 1992 (aged 22)	(Saudi Arabian Football Federation) Damac

=== South Korea ===
Coach: Lee Kwang-jong

No.	Pos.	Player	Date of birth (age)	Club
1	GK	Kim Seung-gyu	30 September 1990 (aged 23)	(Korea Football Association) Ulsan Hyundai
2	DF	Choi Sung-keun	28 July 1991 (aged 23)	(Japan Football Association) Sagan Tosu
3	DF	Kim Jin-su	13 June 1992 (aged 22)	(German Football Association) Hoffenheim
4	DF	Kim Min-hyeok	27 February 1992 (aged 22)	(Japan Football Association) Sagan Tosu
5	DF	Lee Joo-young	16 March 1991 (aged 23)	(Japan Football Association) Montedio Yamagata
6	MF	Son Jun-ho	12 May 1992 (aged 22)	(Korea Football Association) Pohang Steelers
7	MF	An Yong-woo	10 August 1991 (aged 23)	(Korea Football Association) Jeonnam Dragons
8	MF	Park Joo-ho	16 January 1987 (aged 27)	(German Football Association) Mainz 05
9	FW	Lee Yong-jae	8 June 1991 (aged 23)	(Japan Football Association) V-Varen Nagasaki
10	MF	Kim Seung-dae	1 April 1991 (aged 23)	(Korea Football Association) Pohang Steelers
11	MF	Yun Il-lok	27 March 1992 (aged 22)	(Korea Football Association) FC Seoul
12	GK	No Dong-geon	4 October 1991 (aged 22)	(Korea Football Association) Suwon Samsung Bluewings
13	DF	Kwak Hae-seong	6 December 1991 (aged 22)	(Korea Football Association) Seongnam
14	MF	Kim Young-uk	29 April 1991 (aged 23)	(Korea Football Association) Jeonnam Dragons
15	DF	Rim Chang-woo	13 February 1992 (aged 22)	(Korea Football Association) Daejeon Citizen
16	FW	Lee Jong-ho	24 February 1992 (aged 22)	(Korea Football Association) Jeonnam Dragons
17	MF	Lee Jae-sung	10 August 1992 (aged 22)	(Korea Football Association) Jeonbuk Hyundai Motors
18	FW	Kim Shin-wook	14 April 1988 (aged 26)	(Korea Football Association) Ulsan Hyundai
19	MF	Moon Sang-yun	9 January 1991 (aged 23)	(Korea Football Association) Incheon United
20	DF	Jang Hyun-soo	28 September 1991 (aged 22)	(Chinese Football Association) Guangzhou R&F

== Group B ==
=== Afghanistan ===
Coach: Zahir Khodadad

No.	Pos.	Player	Date of birth (age)	Club
1	GK	Mansur Faqiryar	3 January 1986 (aged 28)	(German Football Association) Oldenburg
2	DF	Abassin Alikhil	19 April 1991 (aged 23)	(German Football Association) Viktoria Aschaffenburg
3	DF	Zohib Islam Amiri	15 February 1990 (aged 24)	(All India Football Federation) Dempo
4	DF	Farzad Ataie	21 March 1991 (aged 23)	(Afghanistan Football Federation) Toofan Harirod
5	DF	Sayed Masood Hashemi	1 March 1994 (aged 20)	(Afghanistan Football Federation) Shaheen Asmayee
6	DF	Roholla Iqbalzadeh	2 November 1994 (aged 19)	(Norwegian Football Federation) Bodø/Glimt II
7	MF	Mustafa Azadzoy	24 July 1992 (aged 22)	(German Football Association) Uphusen
8	MF	Kanischka Taher	4 April 1991 (aged 23)	(German Football Association) Alemannia Aachen II
9	MF	Mohammad Azim	12 December 1996 (aged 17)	(Afghanistan Football Federation) Shaheen Asmayee
10	MF	Faysal Shayesteh	10 June 1991 (aged 23)	(Football Association of Thailand) Songkhla United
11	FW	Sandjar Ahmadi	10 February 1992 (aged 22)	(German Football Association) Vier- und Marschlande
12	DF	Sayed Mohammad Hashemi	2 March 1994 (aged 20)	(Afghanistan Football Federation) Shaheen Asmayee
13	MF	Omid Naseeb	29 April 1995 (aged 19)	(Afghanistan Football Federation) Simorgh Alborz
14	DF	Asadullah Hamidullah	18 June 1991 (aged 23)	(Afghanistan Football Federation) Simorgh Alborz
16	DF	Djelaludin Sharityar	15 March 1983 (aged 31)	(German Football Association) Schweinfurt 05
18	MF	Mahmood Azad	8 February 1994 (aged 20)	(Afghanistan Football Federation) Shaheen Asmayee
19	FW	Amredin Sharifi	2 July 1992 (aged 22)	(Afghanistan Football Federation) Shaheen Asmayee
20	GK	Fardin Kohistani	15 June 1994 (aged 20)	(Afghanistan Football Federation) Shaheen Asmayee

=== Bangladesh ===
Coach: (Netherlands) Lodewijk de Kruif

No.	Pos.	Player	Date of birth (age)	Club
1	GK	Shahidul Alam Sohel	1 May 1992 (aged 22)	(Bangladesh Football Federation) Dhaka Abahani
2	DF	Raihan Hasan	10 September 1994 (aged 20)	(Bangladesh Football Federation) Sheikh Jamal DC
3	DF	Kesto Kumar Bose	16 April 1992 (aged 22)	(Bangladesh Football Federation) Sheikh Jamal DC
4	DF	Yeasin Khan	16 September 1994 (aged 20)	(Bangladesh Football Federation) Sheikh Jamal DC
5	MF	Mohamed Zahid Hossain	15 June 1988 (aged 26)	(Bangladesh Football Federation) Sheikh Russel
6	MF	Jamal Bhuyan	10 April 1990 (aged 24)	(Danish Football Association) Avedøre
7	MF	Sohel Rana	27 March 1995 (aged 19)	(Bangladesh Football Federation) Sheikh Jamal DC
8	MF	Mamunul Islam	12 December 1988 (aged 25)	(Bangladesh Football Federation) Sheikh Jamal DC
9	FW	Aminur Rahman Sajib	18 June 1994 (aged 20)	(Bangladesh Football Federation) BJMC
10	MF	Hemanta Vincent Biswas	13 December 1995 (aged 18)	(Bangladesh Football Federation) Mohammedan Dhaka
11	FW	Wahed Ahmed	3 December 1993 (aged 20)	(Bangladesh Football Federation) Mohammedan Dhaka
12	GK	Russel Mahmud Liton	30 November 1994 (aged 19)	(Bangladesh Football Federation) Muktijoddha Sangsad
13	DF	Topu Barman	20 December 1994 (aged 19)	(Bangladesh Football Federation) Mohammedan Dhaka
14	DF	Tutul Hossain Badsha	12 August 1999 (aged 15)	(Bangladesh Football Federation) Dhaka Abahani
15	DF	Yeamin Ahmed Chowdhury Munna	2 August 1991 (aged 23)	(Bangladesh Football Federation) Sheikh Jamal DC
16	MF	Atiqur Rahman Fahad	15 September 1995 (aged 19)	(Bangladesh Football Federation) Chittagong Abahani
17	MF	Yousuf Sifat	10 August 1994 (aged 20)	(Bangladesh Football Federation) Mohammedan Dhaka
18	MF	Omar Faruque Babu	5 August 1994 (aged 20)	(Bangladesh Football Federation) BJMC
19	FW	Toklis Ahmed	2 October 1995 (aged 18)	(Bangladesh Football Federation) Sheikh Jamal DC
20	FW	Jewel Rana	25 December 1995 (aged 18)	(Bangladesh Football Federation) Brothers Union

=== Hong Kong ===
Coach: (South Korea) Kim Pan-gon

No.	Pos.	Player	Date of birth (age)	Club
1	GK	Yapp Hung Fai	21 March 1990 (aged 24)	(Football Association of Hong Kong, China) Eastern
2	DF	Wong Tsz Ho	7 March 1994 (aged 20)	(Football Association of Hong Kong, China) Wong Tai Sin
3	MF	Emmet Wan	26 March 1992 (aged 22)	(Football Association of Hong Kong, China) Kitchee
4	DF	Leung Nok Hang	14 November 1994 (aged 19)	(Football Association of Hong Kong, China) YFCMD
5	DF	Leung Kwun Chung	1 April 1992 (aged 22)	(Football Association of Hong Kong, China) YFCMD
6	MF	Tan Chun Lok	5 January 1996 (aged 18)	(Football Association of Hong Kong, China) YFCMD
7	FW	Chuck Yiu Kwok	29 May 1994 (aged 20)	(Football Association of Hong Kong, China) Biu Chun Rangers
8	DF	Lee Ka Yiu	10 April 1992 (aged 22)	(Football Association of Hong Kong, China) YFCMD
9	MF	Wong Wai	27 August 1992 (aged 22)	(Football Association of Hong Kong, China) YFCMD
10	MF	Ju Yingzhi	24 July 1987 (aged 27)	(Football Association of Hong Kong, China) Sun Pegasus
11	FW	Lam Hok Hei	18 September 1991 (aged 23)	(Football Association of Hong Kong, China) Biu Chun Rangers
12	MF	Chan Siu Kwan	1 August 1992 (aged 22)	(Football Association of Hong Kong, China) South China
13	DF	Li Ngai Hoi	15 October 1994 (aged 19)	(Chinese Football Association) Shenyang Zhongze
14	DF	Fong Pak Lun	14 April 1993 (aged 21)	(Chinese Football Association) Shenyang Zhongze
15	FW	Christian Annan	3 May 1978 (aged 36)	(Football Association of Hong Kong, China) Kitchee
16	MF	Tam Lok Hin	12 January 1991 (aged 23)	(Football Association of Hong Kong, China) Citizen
17	DF	Chan Pak Hang	21 November 1992 (aged 21)	(Football Association of Hong Kong, China) Sun Pegasus
18	GK	Tsang Man Fai	2 August 1991 (aged 23)	(Football Association of Hong Kong, China) South China
20	DF	Lo Kong Wai	19 June 1992 (aged 22)	(Football Association of Hong Kong, China) South China
21	DF	Leung Ka Hai	22 April 1993 (aged 21)	(Football Association of Hong Kong, China) Kitchee

=== Uzbekistan ===
Coach: Mirjalol Qosimov

No.	Pos.	Player	Date of birth (age)	Club
1	GK	Eldorbek Suyunov	12 April 1991 (aged 23)	(Uzbekistan Football Association) Nasaf Qarshi
2	DF	Egor Krimets	27 January 1992 (aged 22)	(Uzbekistan Football Association) Pakhtakor Tashkent
3	DF	Sherzod Fayziev	6 February 1992 (aged 22)	(Uzbekistan Football Association) Mash'al Mubarek
4	DF	Boburbek Yuldashov	8 April 1993 (aged 21)	(Uzbekistan Football Association) Lokomotiv Tashkent
5	MF	Dilshod Juraev	21 April 1992 (aged 22)	(Uzbekistan Football Association) Bunyodkor Tashkent
6	DF	Azamat Isroilov	29 October 1991 (aged 22)	(Uzbekistan Football Association) Olmaliq
7	MF	Fozil Musaev	2 January 1989 (aged 25)	(Uzbekistan Football Association) Lokomotiv Tashkent
8	MF	Jamshid Iskanderov	16 October 1993 (aged 20)	(Uzbekistan Football Association) Pakhtakor Tashkent
9	MF	Shahzodbek Nurmatov	18 September 1991 (aged 23)	(Uzbekistan Football Association) Metallurg Bekabad
10	MF	Vladimir Kozak	12 June 1993 (aged 21)	(Uzbekistan Football Association) Pakhtakor Tashkent
11	FW	Navruzbek Olimov	21 March 1992 (aged 22)	(Uzbekistan Football Association) Qizilqum Zarafshon
12	GK	Nikita Ribkin	20 January 1992 (aged 22)	(Uzbekistan Football Association) Pakhtakor Tashkent
13	DF	Davron Khashimov	24 November 1992 (aged 21)	(Uzbekistan Football Association) Pakhtakor Tashkent
14	MF	Akbar Ismatullaev	10 January 1991 (aged 23)	(Uzbekistan Football Association) Pakhtakor Tashkent
15	FW	Vokhid Shodiev	9 November 1986 (aged 27)	(Uzbekistan Football Association) Bunyodkor Tashkent
16	FW	Sardor Rashidov	14 June 1991 (aged 23)	(Uzbekistan Football Association) Bunyodkor Tashkent
17	FW	Igor Sergeev	30 April 1993 (aged 21)	(Uzbekistan Football Association) Pakhtakor Tashkent
18	DF	Salim Mustafaev	8 March 1991 (aged 23)	(Uzbekistan Football Association) Lokomotiv Tashkent
19	MF	Farrukh Sayfiev	17 January 1991 (aged 23)	(Uzbekistan Football Association) Nasaf Qarshi
20	DF	Islom Tukhtakhujaev	30 October 1989 (aged 24)	(Uzbekistan Football Association) Lokomotiv Tashkent

== Group C ==
=== Oman ===
Coach: Hamad Al-Azani

No.	Pos.	Player	Date of birth (age)	Club
1	GK	Mazin Al-Kasbi	27 April 1993 (aged 21)	(Oman Football Association) Fanja
2	DF	Anwar Al-Hinai	18 February 1993 (aged 21)	(Oman Football Association) Al-Nahda
3	DF	Mohammed Al-Rawahi	26 April 1993 (aged 21)	(Oman Football Association) Dhofar
4	MF	Yaseen Al-Sheyadi	5 February 1994 (aged 20)	(Oman Football Association) Al-Suwaiq
5	MF	Anwar Al-Shakal	23 November 1994 (aged 19)	(Oman Football Association) Al-Nasr
6	MF	Mahmood Al-Mushaifri	14 January 1993 (aged 21)	(Oman Football Association) Al-Suwaiq
7	FW	Rashadi Al-Shakili	25 January 1993 (aged 21)	(Oman Football Association) Dhofar
8	MF	Omer Al-Malki	4 January 1994 (aged 20)	(Oman Football Association) Al-Seeb
9	FW	Husnee Al-Hinai	9 September 1993 (aged 21)	(Oman Football Association) Nizwa
10	FW	Saud Al-Farsi	3 April 1993 (aged 21)	(Oman Football Association) Sur
11	MF	Hatem Al-Hamhami	22 April 1994 (aged 20)	(Oman Football Association) Al-Nahda
12	GK	Ahmed Al-Rawahi	5 May 1994 (aged 20)	(Oman Football Association) Al-Nasr
13	MF	Khalid Al-Hamdani	20 September 1993 (aged 20)	(Oman Football Association) Al-Seeb
14	MF	Omer Al-Fazari	19 May 1993 (aged 21)	(Oman Football Association) Sohar
15	DF	Abdulaziz Al-Gheilani	14 May 1995 (aged 19)	(Oman Football Association) Sur
16	DF	Mohannad Al-Hasani	10 February 1993 (aged 21)	(Oman Football Association) Al-Nahda
17	MF	Abdulmajid Said	27 October 1993 (aged 20)	(Oman Football Association) Dhofar
18	FW	Ahmed Al-Siyabi	16 July 1993 (aged 21)	(Oman Football Association) Sur
19	DF	Fahmi Said	10 October 1993 (aged 20)	(Oman Football Association) Al-Nasr
20	DF	Basil Al-Rawahi	25 September 1993 (aged 20)	(Oman Football Association) Fanja

=== Palestine ===
Coach: Abdelnasser Barakat

No.	Pos.	Player	Date of birth (age)	Club
1	GK	Ghanim Mahajna	20 April 1991 (aged 23)	(Palestinian Football Association) Shabab Al-Dhahiriya
2	FW	Islam Batran	1 October 1994 (aged 19)	(Palestinian Football Association) Shabab Yatta
3	DF	Tamer Salah	3 April 1986 (aged 28)	(Palestinian Football Association) Hilal Al-Quds
4	DF	Ibrahim Jalayta	9 November 1994 (aged 19)	(Palestinian Football Association) Hilal Areeha
5	DF	Khaled Mahdi	1 February 1987 (aged 27)	(Palestinian Football Association) Markaz Shabab Al-Am'ari
6	FW	Hilal Musa	31 May 1990 (aged 24)	(Palestinian Football Association) Shabab Al-Khader
7	DF	Musab Al-Battat	12 November 1993 (aged 20)	(Palestinian Football Association) Shabab Al-Dhahiriya
8	MF	Rami Al-Masalma	12 November 1991 (aged 22)	(Palestinian Football Association) Shabab Al-Khader
9	FW	Mohammed Maraaba	12 March 1994 (aged 20)	(Palestinian Football Association) Islami Qalqilya
10	MF	Musab Abu-Salem	25 January 1993 (aged 21)	(Palestinian Football Association) Ahli Al-Khaleel
11	MF	Ahmad Maher Wridat	22 July 1991 (aged 23)	(Palestinian Football Association) Shabab Al-Dhahiriya
12	FW	Tareq Abu-Gheneima	5 October 1992 (aged 21)	(Palestinian Football Association) Markaz Shabab Al-Am'ari
13	MF	Mahmoud Abu-Warda	31 May 1995 (aged 19)	(Palestinian Football Association) Markaz Balata
14	DF	Abdallah Jaber	17 February 1993 (aged 21)	(Palestinian Football Association) Hilal Al-Quds
15	GK	Rami Hamadeh	24 March 1994 (aged 20)	(Palestinian Football Association) Thaqafi Tulkarem
16	GK	Khaled Azzam	7 July 1992 (aged 22)	(Palestinian Football Association) Hilal Al-Quds
17	DF	Thaer Jboor	20 March 1992 (aged 22)	(Palestinian Football Association) Shabab Yatta
18	MF	Mahmoud Shaikh Qasem	22 April 1993 (aged 21)	(Palestinian Football Association) Markaz Shabab Al-Am'ari
19	MF	Nemer Wasef	29 August 1992 (aged 22)	(Palestinian Football Association) Thaqafi Tulkarem
20	MF	Oday Kharoub	5 February 1993 (aged 21)	(Palestinian Football Association) Silwan Al-Muqaddasi

=== Singapore ===
Coach: Aide Iskandar

No.	Pos.	Player	Date of birth (age)	Club
1	GK	Hassan Sunny	2 April 1984 (aged 30)	(Football Association of Singapore) Warriors
2	DF	Shakir Hamzah	20 October 1992 (aged 21)	(Football Association of Singapore) LionsXII
3	DF	Fadli Kamis	7 November 1992 (aged 21)	(Football Association of Singapore) Courts Young Lions
4	MF	Anumanthan Kumar	14 July 1994 (aged 20)	(Football Association of Singapore) Courts Young Lions
5	DF	Baihakki Khaizan	31 January 1984 (aged 30)	(Football Association of Singapore) LionsXII
6	FW	Khairul Nizam	25 June 1991 (aged 23)	(Football Association of Singapore) LionsXII
7	MF	Sahil Suhaimi	8 July 1992 (aged 22)	(Football Association of Singapore) Courts Young Lions
8	DF	Afiq Yunos	10 December 1990 (aged 23)	(Football Association of Singapore) LionsXII
9	DF	Nazrul Nazari	11 February 1991 (aged 23)	(Football Association of Singapore) LionsXII
10	FW	Faris Ramli	24 August 1992 (aged 22)	(Football Association of Singapore) LionsXII
11	MF	Shahfiq Ghani	17 March 1992 (aged 22)	(Football Association of Singapore) LionsXII
12	FW	Suria Prakash	23 December 1993 (aged 20)	(Football Association of Singapore) Warriors
13	DF	Amirul Adli	13 January 1996 (aged 18)	(Football Association of Singapore) Courts Young Lions
14	DF	Safuwan Baharudin	22 September 1991 (aged 22)	(Football Association of Singapore) LionsXII
15	MF	Adam Swandi	12 January 1996 (aged 18)	(French Football Federation) Metz
16	DF	Al-Qaasimy Rahman	21 January 1992 (aged 22)	(Football Association of Singapore) Courts Young Lions
17	MF	Zulfahmi Arifin	5 October 1991 (aged 22)	(Football Association of Singapore) LionsXII
18	GK	Rudy Khairullah	19 July 1994 (aged 20)	(Football Association of Singapore) Courts Young Lions
19	FW	Iqbal Hussain	6 June 1993 (aged 21)	(Football Association of Singapore) Courts Young Lions
20	FW	Shameer Aziq	30 December 1995 (aged 18)	(Football Association of Singapore) Courts Young Lions

=== Tajikistan ===
Coach: Mukhsin Mukhamadiev

No.	Pos.	Player	Date of birth (age)	Club
1	GK	Alisher Tuychiev	8 March 1976 (aged 38)	(Tajikistan Football Federation) Istiklol Dushanbe
2	DF	Naim Ulmasov	26 April 1992 (aged 22)	(Tajikistan Football Federation) Istiklol Dushanbe
3	DF	Siyovush Asrorov	21 July 1992 (aged 22)	(Tajikistan Football Federation) Istiklol Dushanbe
4	DF	Alisher Sharipov	22 April 1994 (aged 20)	(Tajikistan Football Federation) Regar-TadAZ Tursunzoda
5	DF	Khurshed Beknazarov	26 June 1994 (aged 20)	(Tajikistan Football Federation) Regar-TadAZ Tursunzoda
6	DF	Bakhtiyor Azimov	4 July 1994 (aged 20)	(Tajikistan Football Federation) Energetik Dushanbe
7	MF	Umedzhon Sharipov	4 October 1992 (aged 21)	(Tajikistan Football Federation) Istiklol Dushanbe
8	MF	Nuriddin Davronov	16 January 1991 (aged 23)	(Tajikistan Football Federation) Istiklol Dushanbe
9	FW	Shodibek Gaforov	7 October 1992 (aged 21)	(Tajikistan Football Federation) Energetik Dushanbe
10	FW	Jahongir Ergashev	6 March 1994 (aged 20)	(Tajikistan Football Federation) Istiklol Dushanbe
11	MF	Amirbek Juraboev	13 April 1996 (aged 18)	(Tajikistan Football Federation) Khayr Vahdat
12	MF	Rasul Payzov	16 February 1992 (aged 22)	(Tajikistan Football Federation) Regar-TadAZ Tursunzoda
14	MF	Romish Jalilov	21 November 1995 (aged 18)	(Tajikistan Football Federation) Istiklol Dushanbe
15	MF	Abdullo Saidov	25 January 1994 (aged 20)	(Tajikistan Football Federation) CSKA Dushanbe
16	GK	Muminjon Gadoyboev	18 March 1993 (aged 21)	(Tajikistan Football Federation) Parvoz Bobojon Ghafurov
17	FW	Dilshod Vasiev	12 February 1988 (aged 26)	(Tajikistan Football Federation) Istiklol Dushanbe
18	MF	Fatkhullo Fatkhuloev	24 March 1990 (aged 24)	(Tajikistan Football Federation) Istiklol Dushanbe
19	DF	Akhtam Nazarov	29 September 1992 (aged 21)	(Tajikistan Football Federation) Istiklol Dushanbe

== Group D ==
=== Iraq ===
Coach: Hakeem Shaker

No.	Pos.	Player	Date of birth (age)	Club
1	GK	Ali Yaseen	9 August 1993 (aged 21)	(Iraq Football Association) Naft Al-Janoob
2	MF	Mahdi Karim	10 December 1983 (aged 30)	(Iraq Football Association) Al-Shorta
3	DF	Ali Bahjat	3 March 1992 (aged 22)	(Iraq Football Association) Al-Shorta
4	DF	Mustafa Nadhim	23 September 1993 (aged 20)	(Iraq Football Association) Al-Quwa Al-Jawiya
5	DF	Saad Natiq	19 March 1994 (aged 20)	(Iraq Football Association) Al-Quwa Al-Jawiya
6	DF	Ali Adnan	19 December 1993 (aged 20)	(Turkish Football Federation) Çaykur Rizespor
7	MF	Saad Abdul-Amir	19 January 1992 (aged 22)	(Iraq Football Association) Erbil
8	MF	Saif Salman	1 July 1993 (aged 21)	(Iraq Football Association) Al-Quwa Al-Jawiya
9	DF	Dhurgham Ismail	23 May 1994 (aged 20)	(Iraq Football Association) Al-Shorta
10	FW	Younis Mahmoud	3 February 1983 (aged 31)	(Saudi Arabian Football Federation) Al-Ahli
11	MF	Humam Tariq	10 February 1996 (aged 18)	(United Arab Emirates Football Association) Al-Ahli
12	GK	Jalal Hassan	18 May 1991 (aged 23)	(Iraq Football Association) Erbil
13	DF	Sameh Saeed	26 May 1992 (aged 22)	(Iraq Football Association) Baghdad
14	FW	Amjad Kalaf	20 March 1991 (aged 23)	(Iraq Football Association) Al-Shorta
15	DF	Salam Shaker	31 July 1986 (aged 28)	(Iraq Football Association) Al-Shorta
16	FW	Marwan Hussein	26 January 1992 (aged 22)	(Iraq Football Association) Al-Shorta
17	FW	Farhan Shakor	15 October 1995 (aged 18)	(Iraq Football Association) Al-Zawraa
18	MF	Bashar Resan	22 December 1996 (aged 17)	(Iraq Football Association) Al-Quwa Al-Jawiya
19	MF	Mahdi Kamil	6 January 1995 (aged 19)	(Iraq Football Association) Al-Shorta
20	GK	Mohammed Hameed	24 January 1993 (aged 21)	(Iraq Football Association) Al-Shorta

=== Japan ===
Coach: Makoto Teguramori

No.	Pos.	Player	Date of birth (age)	Club
1	GK	Ayumi Niekawa	12 May 1994 (aged 20)	(Japan Football Association) Júbilo Iwata
2	DF	Sei Muroya	5 April 1994 (aged 20)	(Japan Football Association) Meiji University
3	DF	Wataru Endo	9 February 1993 (aged 21)	(Japan Football Association) Shonan Bellmare
4	DF	Takuya Iwanami	18 June 1994 (aged 20)	(Japan Football Association) Vissel Kobe
5	DF	Takaharu Nishino	14 September 1993 (aged 21)	(Japan Football Association) Gamba Osaka
6	DF	Ryosuke Yamanaka	20 April 1993 (aged 21)	(Japan Football Association) JEF United Chiba
7	MF	Ryota Oshima	23 January 1993 (aged 21)	(Japan Football Association) Kawasaki Frontale
8	MF	Riki Harakawa	18 August 1993 (aged 21)	(Japan Football Association) Ehime
9	FW	Musashi Suzuki	11 February 1994 (aged 20)	(Japan Football Association) Albirex Niigata
10	MF	Shoya Nakajima	23 August 1994 (aged 20)	(Japan Football Association) FC Tokyo
11	MF	Takeshi Kanamori	4 April 1994 (aged 20)	(Japan Football Association) Avispa Fukuoka
12	MF	Shinya Yajima	18 January 1994 (aged 20)	(Japan Football Association) Urawa Red Diamonds
13	MF	Gakuto Notsuda	6 June 1994 (aged 20)	(Japan Football Association) Sanfrecce Hiroshima
14	FW	Takuma Arano	20 April 1993 (aged 21)	(Japan Football Association) Consadole Sapporo
15	MF	Takuya Kida	23 August 1994 (aged 20)	(Japan Football Association) Yokohama F. Marinos
16	DF	Kyohei Yoshino	8 November 1994 (aged 19)	(Japan Football Association) Sanfrecce Hiroshima
17	MF	Hideyuki Nozawa	15 August 1994 (aged 20)	(Japan Football Association) FC Tokyo
18	GK	William Popp	21 October 1994 (aged 19)	(Japan Football Association) Tokyo Verdy
19	MF	Hiroki Akino	8 October 1994 (aged 19)	(Japan Football Association) Kashiwa Reysol
20	DF	Naomichi Ueda	24 October 1994 (aged 19)	(Japan Football Association) Kashima Antlers

=== Kuwait ===
Coach: Ali Al-Shammari

No.	Pos.	Player	Date of birth (age)	Club
1	GK	Saud Al-Jenaie	12 June 1994 (aged 20)	(Kuwait Football Association) Al-Arabi
2	DF	Sami Al-Sanea	9 January 1993 (aged 21)	(Kuwait Football Association) Al-Kuwait
3	DF	Ali Atiq	3 June 1994 (aged 20)	(Kuwait Football Association) Al-Sahel
4	DF	Mohammad Al-Bathali	29 May 1993 (aged 21)	(Kuwait Football Association) Al-Sulaibikhat
5	DF	Musaed Al-Enezi	26 January 1993 (aged 21)	(Kuwait Football Association) Al-Kuwait
6	DF	Faisal Saeed	6 June 1994 (aged 20)	(Kuwait Football Association) Al-Qadsia
7	MF	Hussain Al-Harbi	19 June 1995 (aged 19)	(Kuwait Football Association) Al-Kuwait
8	MF	Marzouq Al-Jadaan	23 November 1993 (aged 20)	(Kuwait Football Association) Al-Tadhamon
9	FW	Yousef Najaf	29 January 1993 (aged 21)	(Kuwait Football Association) Al-Yarmouk
10	FW	Faisal Ajab Al-Azemi	23 January 1993 (aged 21)	(Kuwait Football Association) Al-Qadsia
11	MF	Talal Al-Mutairi	3 March 1995 (aged 19)	(Kuwait Football Association) Al-Kuwait
12	FW	Abdullah Mawi	28 November 1995 (aged 18)	(Kuwait Football Association) Al-Qadsia
13	GK	Ali Fadhel	27 October 1993 (aged 20)	(Kuwait Football Association) Kazma
14	MF	Yousef Al-Khebeezi	3 October 1995 (aged 18)	(Kuwait Football Association) Al-Kuwait
15	MF	Fahad Al-Hamdan	18 September 1993 (aged 21)	(Kuwait Football Association) Al-Yarmouk
16	GK	Ali Jeragh	25 March 1996 (aged 18)	(Kuwait Football Association) Al-Arabi
17	DF	Mohammad Al-Nassar	24 May 1996 (aged 18)	(Kuwait Football Association) Al-Qadsia
18	MF	Abdullah Al-Bather	3 June 1993 (aged 21)	(Kuwait Football Association) Al-Qadsia
19	MF	Mohammad Al-Enezi	27 December 1993 (aged 20)	(Kuwait Football Association) Al-Kuwait
20	MF	Mahmoud Dashti	24 August 1994 (aged 20)	(Kuwait Football Association) Al-Arabi

=== Nepal ===
Coach: (United States) Jack Stefanowski

No.	Pos.	Player	Date of birth (age)	Club
1	GK	Dinesh Thapa Magar	19 June 1992 (aged 22)	(All Nepal Football Association) Machhindra
2	DF	Rabin Shrestha	17 May 1991 (aged 23)	(All Nepal Football Association) Nepal Police
3	DF	Aditya Chaudhary	19 April 1996 (aged 18)	(All Nepal Football Association) Three Star
4	MF	Shyam Nepali	13 September 1992 (aged 22)	(All Nepal Football Association) Armed Police Force
5	DF	Ajit Bhandari	7 February 1994 (aged 20)	(All Nepal Football Association) Nepal Police
6	DF	Rohit Chand	1 March 1992 (aged 22)	(Football Association of Indonesia) Persija Jakarta
7	MF	Prakash Budhathoki	21 May 1993 (aged 21)	(All Nepal Football Association) Three Star
9	FW	Ashim Jung Karki	13 March 1995 (aged 19)	(All Nepal Football Association) Boys Union
10	MF	Jagajeet Shrestha	7 August 1993 (aged 21)	(All Nepal Football Association) Three Star
11	MF	Heman Gurung	27 February 1996 (aged 18)	(All Nepal Football Association) Sahara Pokhara
12	MF	Bikram Lama	23 February 1989 (aged 25)	(All Nepal Football Association) Three Star
13	DF	Sandip Rai	14 April 1989 (aged 25)	(All Nepal Football Association) Three Star
14	MF	Sushil KC	11 March 1993 (aged 21)	(All Nepal Football Association) Friends
15	FW	Bharat Khawas	29 October 1991 (aged 22)	(All Nepal Football Association) Nepal Army
16	GK	Alan Neupane	24 June 1996 (aged 18)	(All Nepal Football Association) Three Star
17	FW	Amar Dongol	26 December 1993 (aged 20)	(All Nepal Football Association) Ranipokhari Corner
18	DF	Rajin Dhimal	4 April 1991 (aged 23)	(All Nepal Football Association) Machhindra
19	DF	Sagar Thapa	21 November 1985 (aged 28)	(All Nepal Football Association) Manang Marshyangdi
20	GK	Bikesh Kuthu	24 June 1993 (aged 21)	(All Nepal Football Association) Madhyapur Youth Association

== Group E ==
=== East Timor ===
Coach: (Brazil) Antonio Carlos Vieira

No.	Pos.	Player	Date of birth (age)	Club
2	DF	Jorge Victor	5 December 1997 (aged 16)	(East Timor Football Federation) Persiku Dynamo Kupang
3	MF	Adelino Trindade	2 June 1995 (aged 19)	(East Timor Football Federation) Dili United
4	FW	Anggisu Barbosa	16 March 1993 (aged 21)	(Football Association of Thailand) Sriracha
5	DF	Paulo Martins	20 November 1991 (aged 22)	(Brazilian Football Confederation) Itaboraí Profute
6	MF	Marcos Gusmão	14 March 1997 (aged 17)	
7	MF	Carlos Magno	29 May 1997 (aged 17)	(East Timor Football Federation) Gleno
8	MF	Nilo Soares	18 July 1994 (aged 20)	(East Timor Football Federation) SLB Dili
9	MF	Fellipe Bertoldo	5 January 1991 (aged 23)	(Brazilian Football Confederation) Inter de Bebedouro
10	FW	Ricardo Sousa Maia	21 July 1991 (aged 23)	
11	DF	Diogo Rangel	19 August 1991 (aged 23)	(Korea Football Association) Gangwon
12	GK	Ramos Maxanches	12 April 1994 (aged 20)	(East Timor Football Federation) Porto Taibesse
13	MF	Eujebio Pereira	8 August 1996 (aged 18)	
14	MF	Boavida Olegario	24 October 1994 (aged 19)	(East Timor Football Federation) SLB Dili
15	DF	Agostinho	28 August 1997 (aged 17)	(East Timor Football Federation) Porto Taibesse
16	DF	José Guterres	24 April 1998 (aged 16)	(East Timor Football Federation) SLB Dili
17	DF	Candido Monteiro	2 December 1997 (aged 16)	(East Timor Football Federation) Teouma Academy
20	GK	Juliao Monteiro	17 July 1993 (aged 21)	(East Timor Football Federation) Lospalos
21	DF	Filipe Oliveira	14 May 1995 (aged 19)	(East Timor Football Federation) Real Ermera Lions
22	MF	Nataniel Reis	25 March 1995 (aged 19)	(East Timor Football Federation) Porto Taibesse
24	DF	Ezequiel Fernandes	8 April 1996 (aged 18)	(East Timor Football Federation) Tigres Maubara

=== Indonesia ===
Coach: Aji Santoso

No.	Pos.	Player	Date of birth (age)	Club
1	GK	Teguh Amiruddin	13 August 1993 (aged 21)	(Football Association of Indonesia) Perseru Serui
2	DF	Mochammad Zaenuri	10 June 1995 (aged 19)	(Football Association of Indonesia) Perseba Bangkalan
3	DF	Dany Saputra	1 January 1991 (aged 23)	(Football Association of Indonesia) Persija Jakarta
4	DF	Victor Igbonefo	10 October 1985 (aged 28)	(Football Association of Indonesia) Arema Cronus
5	DF	Alfin Tuasalamony	13 November 1992 (aged 21)	(Football Association of Indonesia) Bhayangkara F.C.
7	MF	Ramdani Lestaluhu	5 November 1991 (aged 22)	(Football Association of Indonesia) Persija Jakarta
8	MF	Fandi Eko Utomo	2 March 1991 (aged 23)	(Football Association of Indonesia) Bhayangkara F.C.
9	MF	Syakir Sulaiman	30 September 1992 (aged 21)	(Football Association of Indonesia) Sriwijaya
10	FW	Yandi Munawar	25 May 1992 (aged 22)	(Football Australia) Brisbane Roar Youth
11	MF	Dedi Kusnandar	23 July 1991 (aged 23)	(Football Association of Indonesia) Bhayangkara F.C.
12	GK	Andritany Ardhiyasa	26 December 1991 (aged 22)	(Football Association of Indonesia) Persija Jakarta
13	MF	Manahati Lestusen	17 December 1993 (aged 20)	(Football Association of Indonesia) Bhayangkara F.C.
14	MF	Rasyid Bakri	17 January 1991 (aged 23)	(Football Association of Indonesia) PSM Makassar
15	DF	Achmad Jufriyanto	7 February 1987 (aged 27)	(Football Association of Indonesia) Persib Bandung
16	DF	Syaiful Cahya	28 May 1992 (aged 22)	(Football Association of Indonesia) Persik Kediri
17	FW	Ferdinand Sinaga	18 September 1988 (aged 26)	(Football Association of Indonesia) Persib Bandung
18	MF	Rizky Pellu	26 June 1992 (aged 22)	(Football Association of Indonesia) Pelita Bandung Raya
20	DF	Novri Setiawan	11 November 1993 (aged 20)	(Football Association of Indonesia) Bhayangkara F.C.
21	FW	Aldaier Makatindu	25 May 1992 (aged 22)	(Football Association of Indonesia) Putra Samarinda
23	FW	Bayu Gatra	12 November 1991 (aged 22)	(Football Association of Indonesia) Putra Samarinda

=== Maldives ===
Coach: (Croatia) Drago Mamić

No.	Pos.	Player	Date of birth (age)	Club
1	GK	Mohamed Jazlaan	12 April 1993 (aged 21)	(Football Association of Maldives) Mahibadhoo
2	DF	Ahmed Numaan	10 November 1992 (aged 21)	(Football Association of Maldives) Eagles
3	DF	Samdhooh Mohamed	28 September 1991 (aged 22)	(Football Association of Maldives) Maziya
4	DF	Amdhan Ali	11 September 1992 (aged 22)	(Football Association of Maldives) Maziya
5	MF	Hussain Nihan	6 June 1992 (aged 22)	(Football Association of Maldives) Victory
6	MF	Mohamed Arif	11 August 1985 (aged 29)	(Football Association of Maldives) Maziya
7	FW	Mohamed Muslih	30 September 1993 (aged 20)	(Football Association of Maldives) Eagles
8	DF	Mujuthaaz Mohamed	25 October 1992 (aged 21)	(Football Association of Maldives) Valencia
9	FW	Ahmed Imaz	12 April 1992 (aged 22)	(Football Association of Maldives) Eagles
10	FW	Asadhulla Abdulla	19 October 1990 (aged 23)	(Football Association of Maldives) Maziya
11	MF	Abdul Wahid Ibrahim	18 July 1993 (aged 21)	(Football Association of Maldives) Maziya
12	MF	Hassan Shifaz	11 August 1992 (aged 22)	(Football Association of Maldives) Maziya
13	DF	Shafiu Ahmed	16 March 1987 (aged 27)	(Football Association of Maldives) New Radiant
14	MF	Hamza Mohamed	17 February 1995 (aged 19)	(Football Association of Maldives) New Radiant
15	MF	Moosa Yaamin	29 December 1992 (aged 21)	(Football Association of Maldives) Maziya
16	MF	Mohamed Irufaan	24 July 1994 (aged 20)	(Football Association of Maldives) Maziya
17	MF	Yasfaadh Habeeb	9 September 1992 (aged 22)	(Football Association of Maldives) Eagles
18	GK	Ibrahim Labaan Shareef	18 January 1996 (aged 18)	(Football Association of Maldives) Eagles
19	DF	Mohamed Saaif	17 March 1994 (aged 20)	(Football Association of Maldives) Maziya
20	DF	Ibrahim Haseeb	22 August 1995 (aged 19)	(Football Association of Maldives) Eagles

=== Thailand ===
Coach: Kiatisuk Senamuang

No.	Pos.	Player	Date of birth (age)	Club
1	GK	Kawin Thamsatchanan	26 January 1990 (aged 24)	(Football Association of Thailand) Muangthong United
2	DF	Peerapat Notchaiya	4 February 1993 (aged 21)	(Football Association of Thailand) BEC Tero Sasana
3	DF	Suriya Singmui	7 April 1995 (aged 19)	(Football Association of Thailand) Muangthong United
4	MF	Kroekrit Thaweekarn	19 November 1990 (aged 23)	(Football Association of Thailand) Chonburi
5	DF	Sarawut Kanlayanabandit	27 May 1991 (aged 23)	(Football Association of Thailand) Air Force Central
6	MF	Sarach Yooyen	30 May 1992 (aged 22)	(Football Association of Thailand) Muangthong United
7	MF	Charyl Chappuis	12 January 1992 (aged 22)	(Football Association of Thailand) Suphanburi
8	DF	Wasan Homsan	29 September 1991 (aged 22)	(Football Association of Thailand) Bangkok Glass
9	FW	Adisak Kraisorn	1 February 1991 (aged 23)	(Football Association of Thailand) Buriram United
10	MF	Pokklaw Anan	4 March 1991 (aged 23)	(Football Association of Thailand) Police United
11	MF	Pinyo Inpinit	1 July 1993 (aged 21)	(Football Association of Thailand) Police United
12	MF	Nurul Sriyankem	8 February 1992 (aged 22)	(Football Association of Thailand) Chonburi
13	DF	Narubadin Weerawatnodom	12 July 1994 (aged 20)	(Football Association of Thailand) BEC Tero Sasana
14	MF	Pakorn Prempak	2 February 1993 (aged 21)	(Football Association of Thailand) Police United
15	DF	Chitipat Tanklang	11 August 1991 (aged 23)	(Football Association of Thailand) Buriram United
16	DF	Adisorn Promrak	21 October 1993 (aged 20)	(Football Association of Thailand) BEC Tero Sasana
17	DF	Tanaboon Kesarat	21 September 1993 (aged 20)	(Football Association of Thailand) BEC Tero Sasana
18	MF	Chanathip Songkrasin	5 October 1993 (aged 20)	(Football Association of Thailand) BEC Tero Sasana
19	FW	Chananan Pombuppha	17 March 1992 (aged 22)	(Football Association of Thailand) Osotspa Saraburi
20	GK	Chanin Sae-ear	5 July 1992 (aged 22)	(Football Association of Thailand) Singhtarua

== Group F ==
=== China ===
Coach: Fu Bo

No.	Pos.	Player	Date of birth (age)	Club
1	GK	Fang Jingqi	17 January 1993 (aged 21)	(Chinese Football Association) Guangzhou Evergrande
2	DF	Li Ang	15 September 1993 (aged 21)	(Chinese Football Association) Jiangsu Sainty
3	DF	Cao Haiqing	28 September 1993 (aged 20)	(Chinese Football Association) Hangzhou Greentown
4	DF	Yang Ting	4 June 1993 (aged 21)	(Chinese Football Association) Chengdu Tiancheng
5	DF	Shi Ke	8 January 1993 (aged 21)	(Chinese Football Association) Hangzhou Greentown
6	DF	Han Pengfei	28 April 1993 (aged 21)	(Portuguese Football Federation) Mafra
7	MF	Sun Guowen	30 September 1993 (aged 20)	(Chinese Football Association) Dalian Aerbin
8	MF	Wang Rui	24 April 1993 (aged 21)	(Chinese Football Association) Qingdao Hainiu
9	FW	Yang Chaosheng	22 July 1993 (aged 21)	(Chinese Football Association) Liaoning Whowin
10	MF	Feng Gang	6 March 1993 (aged 21)	(Chinese Football Association) Hangzhou Greentown
11	MF	Tao Yuan	18 January 1993 (aged 21)	(Chinese Football Association) Jiangsu Sainty
12	GK	Xu Jiamin	11 April 1994 (aged 20)	(Chinese Football Association) Guizhou Renhe
13	DF	Fu Huan	12 July 1993 (aged 21)	(Chinese Football Association) Shanghai East Asia
14	FW	Chang Feiya	3 February 1993 (aged 21)	(Chinese Football Association) Guangzhou R&F
15	MF	Liao Lisheng	29 April 1993 (aged 21)	(Chinese Football Association) Guangzhou Evergrande
16	DF	Liao Junjian	27 January 1994 (aged 20)	(Chinese Football Association) Guangdong Sunray Cave
17	MF	Xie Pengfei	29 June 1993 (aged 21)	(Chinese Football Association) Hangzhou Greentown
18	FW	Zhang Wei	19 January 1993 (aged 21)	(Chinese Football Association) Jiangsu Sainty
19	MF	Guo Hao	14 January 1993 (aged 21)	(Chinese Football Association) Tianjin TEDA
20	MF	Zhuang Jiajie	5 September 1993 (aged 21)	(Chinese Football Association) Hangzhou Greentown

=== North Korea ===
Coach: Yun Jong-su

No.	Pos.	Player	Date of birth (age)	Club
1	GK	Ri Myong-guk	9 September 1986 (aged 28)	(DPR Korea Football Association) Pyongyang
2	DF	Jong Kwang-sok	5 January 1994 (aged 20)	(DPR Korea Football Association) Rimyongsu
3	DF	Jang Song-hyok	18 January 1991 (aged 23)	(DPR Korea Football Association) Pyongyang
4	DF	Kim Chol-bom	16 July 1994 (aged 20)	(DPR Korea Football Association) Sobaeksu
5	DF	Jang Kuk-chol	16 February 1994 (aged 20)	(DPR Korea Football Association) Kyonggongopsong
6	DF	Kang Kuk-chol	1 July 1990 (aged 24)	(DPR Korea Football Association) Pyongyang
7	FW	Jo Kwang	5 August 1994 (aged 20)	(DPR Korea Football Association) April 25
8	MF	Ju Jong-chol	20 October 1994 (aged 19)	(DPR Korea Football Association) Amnokgang
9	MF	Rim Kwang-hyok	5 August 1992 (aged 22)	(DPR Korea Football Association) April 25
10	FW	Kim Ju-song	15 October 1993 (aged 20)	(DPR Korea Football Association) April 25
11	MF	Jong Il-gwan	30 October 1992 (aged 21)	(DPR Korea Football Association) Rimyongsu
12	MF	Ri Yong-jik	8 February 1991 (aged 23)	(Japan Football Association) Tokushima Vortis
13	DF	Sim Hyon-jin	1 January 1991 (aged 23)	(DPR Korea Football Association) Sobaeksu
14	MF	Yun Il-gwang	1 April 1993 (aged 21)	(DPR Korea Football Association) Chadongcha
15	FW	Ri Hyok-chol	27 January 1991 (aged 23)	(DPR Korea Football Association) Rimyongsu
16	MF	Kim Yong-il	6 July 1994 (aged 20)	(DPR Korea Football Association) Rimyongsu
17	MF	So Hyon-uk	17 April 1992 (aged 22)	(DPR Korea Football Association) April 25
18	GK	An Tae-song	21 October 1993 (aged 20)	(DPR Korea Football Association) April 25
19	FW	Pak Kwang-ryong	27 September 1992 (aged 21)	(Liechtenstein Football Association) Vaduz
20	MF	So Kyong-jin	8 January 1994 (aged 20)	(DPR Korea Football Association) Hamgyongnamdo

=== Pakistan ===
Coach: (Bahrain) Mohamed Al-Shamlan

No.	Pos.	Player	Date of birth (age)	Club
1	GK	Saqib Hanif	23 April 1994 (aged 20)	(Pakistan Football Federation) KRL
2	DF	Muhammad Sohail	1 August 1994 (aged 20)	(Pakistan Football Federation) WAPDA
3	DF	Muhammad Ahmed	3 January 1988 (aged 26)	(Bahrain Football Association) Isa Town
4	DF	Muhammad Bilal	14 August 1996 (aged 18)	(Pakistan Football Federation) WAPDA
5	DF	Naveed Ahmed	3 January 1993 (aged 21)	(Pakistan Football Federation) KRL
6	MF	Muhammad Riaz	27 February 1996 (aged 18)	(Pakistan Football Federation) KESC
7	FW	Mansoor Khan	20 February 1997 (aged 17)	(Pakistan Football Federation) PAF
8	MF	Mehmood Khan	10 June 1991 (aged 23)	(Pakistan Football Federation) KRL
10	FW	Kaleemullah Khan	20 September 1992 (aged 21)	(Kyrgyz Football Union) Dordoi Bishkek
11	FW	Sher Ali	7 February 1996 (aged 18)	(Pakistan Football Federation) NBP
12	FW	Muhammad Zeeshan	12 August 1997 (aged 17)	(Pakistan Football Federation) KRL
13	DF	Ahsan Ullah	13 December 1992 (aged 21)	(Pakistan Football Federation) KRL
14	FW	Ashfaq-ud-Din	2 May 1997 (aged 17)	(Pakistan Football Federation) KPT
15	DF	Mohsin Ali	1 June 1996 (aged 18)	(Pakistan Football Federation) Navy
17	MF	Saddam Hussain	10 April 1993 (aged 21)	(Kyrgyz Football Union) Dordoi Bishkek
20	GK	Ahsanullah Ahmed	25 February 1995 (aged 19)	(Pakistan Football Federation) HBL
22	GK	Muzammil Hussain	6 September 1993 (aged 21)	(Pakistan Football Federation) WAPDA

== Group G ==
=== India ===
Coach: (Netherlands) Wim Koevermans

No.	Pos.	Player	Date of birth (age)	Club
1	GK	Amrinder Singh	27 May 1993 (aged 21)	(All India Football Federation) Pune
2	DF	Pritam Kotal	9 August 1993 (aged 21)	(All India Football Federation) Mohun Bagan
3	DF	Joyner Lourenco	8 September 1991 (aged 23)	(All India Football Federation) Sporting Goa
4	DF	Sandesh Jhingan	21 July 1993 (aged 21)	(All India Football Federation) Kerala Blasters
5	DF	Narayan Das	25 September 1993 (aged 20)	(All India Football Federation) Dempo
6	MF	Milan Singh	15 May 1992 (aged 22)	(All India Football Federation) Shillong Lajong
7	MF	Pronay Halder	25 February 1993 (aged 21)	(All India Football Federation) Dempo
8	MF	Siam Hanghal	26 May 1993 (aged 21)	(All India Football Federation) Bengaluru
9	FW	Robin Singh	9 May 1990 (aged 24)	(All India Football Federation) Bengaluru
10	MF	Francis Fernandes	25 November 1985 (aged 28)	(All India Football Federation) Delhi Dynamos
11	FW	Sunil Chhetri	3 August 1984 (aged 30)	(All India Football Federation) Bengaluru
12	FW	Thongkhosiem Haokip	26 August 1993 (aged 21)	(All India Football Federation) Pune
13	DF	Shankar Sampingiraj	14 December 1994 (aged 19)	(All India Football Federation) Bengaluru
14	MF	Clifton Dias	10 January 1991 (aged 23)	(All India Football Federation) Salgaocar
15	FW	Mandar Rao Dessai	18 March 1992 (aged 22)	(All India Football Federation) Dempo
16	GK	Ravi Kumar	4 July 1993 (aged 21)	(All India Football Federation) Sporting Goa
17	DF	Keenan Almeida	10 December 1991 (aged 22)	(All India Football Federation) Sporting Goa
18	FW	Seiminlen Doungel	3 January 1994 (aged 20)	(All India Football Federation) Shillong Lajong
19	GK	Kamaljit Singh	28 December 1995 (aged 18)	(All India Football Federation) AIFF Academy
20	MF	Lalrindika Ralte	7 September 1992 (aged 22)	(All India Football Federation) East Bengal

=== Jordan ===
Coach: Jamal Abu-Abed

No.	Pos.	Player	Date of birth (age)	Club
1	GK	Mohammad Abu-Nabhan	1 July 1994 (aged 20)	(Jordan Football Association) Al-Wehdat
2	DF	Omar Manasrah	15 February 1994 (aged 20)	(Jordan Football Association) Al-Jazeera
3	DF	Mohannad Khairullah	25 July 1993 (aged 21)	(Jordan Football Association) Al-Jazeera
4	DF	Bara' Marei	13 April 1994 (aged 20)	(Jordan Football Association) Al-Faisaly
5	DF	Amer Abu-Hudaib	8 August 1993 (aged 21)	(Jordan Football Association) Al-Jazeera
6	MF	Mahmoud Al-Mardi	6 October 1993 (aged 20)	(Jordan Football Association) Ittihad Al-Ramtha
7	MF	Fadi Awad	26 March 1993 (aged 21)	(Jordan Football Association) Shabab Al-Hussein
8	MF	Ihsan Haddad	5 February 1994 (aged 20)	(Jordan Football Association) Al-Arabi
9	MF	Ahmad Al-Essawi	16 July 1993 (aged 21)	(Jordan Football Association) Shabab Al-Ordon
10	FW	Laith Al-Bashtawi	12 March 1994 (aged 20)	(Jordan Football Association) Al-Wehdat
11	FW	Ahmad Sariweh	23 January 1994 (aged 20)	(Saudi Arabian Football Federation) Al-Qadsiah
12	GK	Rabee Izzeldeen	8 August 1994 (aged 20)	(Jordan Football Association) Al-Faisaly
13	DF	Husam Abu-Sadah	15 August 1994 (aged 20)	(Jordan Football Association) Al-Ahli
14	MF	Bilal Al-Dawoud	26 July 1995 (aged 19)	(Jordan Football Association) Al-Ramtha
15	DF	Ali Al-Rthoom	24 August 1993 (aged 21)	(Jordan Football Association) Al-Baqa'a
16	MF	Yazan Thalji	3 September 1994 (aged 20)	(Jordan Football Association) Al-Ahli
17	FW	Samir Raja	3 September 1994 (aged 20)	(Jordan Football Association) Al-Wehdat
19	FW	Osama Al-Omari	7 March 1993 (aged 21)	(Jordan Football Association) Al-Hussein
20	DF	Asem Al-Qudah	6 April 1993 (aged 21)	(Jordan Football Association) Al-Jazeera
25	DF	Munther Raja	22 February 1993 (aged 21)	(Jordan Football Association) Al-Wehdat

=== United Arab Emirates ===
Coach: Ali Ebrahim

No.	Pos.	Player	Date of birth (age)	Club
1	GK	Ahmed Shambih	20 December 1993 (aged 20)	(United Arab Emirates Football Association) Al-Nasr
2	DF	Khalifa Mubarak	30 October 1993 (aged 20)	(United Arab Emirates Football Association) Al-Nasr
3	DF	Darwish Mohammed	8 January 1993 (aged 21)	(United Arab Emirates Football Association) Al-Ahli
4	DF	Salem Sultan	9 May 1993 (aged 21)	(United Arab Emirates Football Association) Al-Wahda
5	MF	Salem Ali Ibrahim	27 September 1993 (aged 20)	(United Arab Emirates Football Association) Al-Jazira
6	DF	Saif Khalfan	31 January 1993 (aged 21)	(United Arab Emirates Football Association) Al-Jazira
7	MF	Mohamed Surour	31 October 1993 (aged 20)	(United Arab Emirates Football Association) Al-Sharjah
8	FW	Walid Amber	11 January 1993 (aged 21)	(United Arab Emirates Football Association) Al-Ahli
9	FW	Mohammed Al-Khori	1 January 1993 (aged 21)	(United Arab Emirates Football Association) Al-Jazira
10	FW	Saeed Al-Kathiri	28 March 1988 (aged 26)	(United Arab Emirates Football Association) Al-Wasl
11	MF	Waleed Hussain	15 May 1992 (aged 22)	(United Arab Emirates Football Association) Al-Ahli
12	DF	Saeed Musabbeh	4 February 1994 (aged 20)	(United Arab Emirates Football Association) Al-Ain
13	MF	Sultan Bargash	18 January 1989 (aged 25)	(United Arab Emirates Football Association) Al-Jazira
14	DF	Salem Rashid Obaid	21 December 1993 (aged 20)	(United Arab Emirates Football Association) Al-Jazira
15	DF	Abdullah Al-Naqbi	28 April 1993 (aged 21)	(United Arab Emirates Football Association) Al-Dhafra
16	MF	Rayan Yaslem	23 November 1994 (aged 19)	(United Arab Emirates Football Association) Al-Ain
17	GK	Hassan Hamza	10 November 1994 (aged 19)	(United Arab Emirates Football Association) Al-Shabab
18	MF	Suhail Al-Mansoori	19 May 1993 (aged 21)	(United Arab Emirates Football Association) Al-Wahda
19	DF	Bandar Al-Ahbabi	9 July 1990 (aged 24)	(United Arab Emirates Football Association) Baniyas
21	FW	Ali Yaqoub	9 January 1993 (aged 21)	(United Arab Emirates Football Association) Al-Shaab

== Group H ==
=== Iran ===
Coach: (Portugal) Nelo Vingada

No.	Pos.	Player	Date of birth (age)	Club
1	GK	Hojjat Sedghi	7 February 1993 (aged 21)	(Football Federation Islamic Republic of Iran) Sanat Mes Kerman
2	DF	Yousef Vakia	30 September 1993 (aged 20)	(Football Federation Islamic Republic of Iran) Foolad Khuzestan
3	DF	Shahriar Shirvand	21 March 1991 (aged 23)	(Football Federation Islamic Republic of Iran) Tractorsazi Tabriz
4	DF	Mohammad Daneshgar	20 January 1994 (aged 20)	(Football Federation Islamic Republic of Iran) Fajr Sepasi Shiraz
5	DF	Mohammad Reza Khanzadeh	11 May 1991 (aged 23)	(Football Federation Islamic Republic of Iran) Persepolis Tehran
6	DF	Morteza Pouraliganji	19 April 1992 (aged 22)	(Football Federation Islamic Republic of Iran) Naft Tehran
7	MF	Rouzbeh Cheshmi	24 July 1993 (aged 21)	(Football Federation Islamic Republic of Iran) Saba Qom
8	MF	Ali Karimi	11 February 1994 (aged 20)	(Football Federation Islamic Republic of Iran) Sepahan Isfahan
9	FW	Kaveh Rezaei	5 April 1992 (aged 22)	(Football Federation Islamic Republic of Iran) Saipa Alborz
10	MF	Mohsen Mosalman	27 January 1991 (aged 23)	(Football Federation Islamic Republic of Iran) Zob Ahan Isfahan
11	MF	Yaghoub Karimi	31 August 1991 (aged 23)	(Football Federation Islamic Republic of Iran) Esteghlal Tehran
12	GK	Mohammad Reza Akhbari	15 February 1993 (aged 21)	(Football Federation Islamic Republic of Iran) Saipa Alborz
13	DF	Hossein Kanaanizadegan	23 March 1994 (aged 20)	(Football Federation Islamic Republic of Iran) Malavan Bandar Anzali
14	MF	Mehdi Mehdipour	18 February 1994 (aged 20)	(Football Federation Islamic Republic of Iran) Rah Ahan Tehran
15	MF	Farshid Esmaeili	23 February 1994 (aged 20)	(Football Federation Islamic Republic of Iran) Fajr Sepasi Shiraz
16	DF	Vahid Heidarieh	2 January 1993 (aged 21)	(Football Federation Islamic Republic of Iran) Paykan Tehran
17	FW	Mehdi Sharifi	16 August 1992 (aged 22)	(Football Federation Islamic Republic of Iran) Sepahan Isfahan
18	MF	Arash Rezavand	5 October 1993 (aged 20)	(Football Federation Islamic Republic of Iran) Naft Tehran
19	MF	Ehsan Pahlavan	25 July 1993 (aged 21)	(Football Federation Islamic Republic of Iran) Zob Ahan Isfahan
20	GK	Mohammad Nasseri	18 April 1993 (aged 21)	(Football Federation Islamic Republic of Iran) Gostaresh Foulad Tabriz

=== Kyrgyzstan ===
Coach: Mirlan Eshenov

No.	Pos.	Player	Date of birth (age)	Club
1	GK	Kalysbek Akimaliev	16 November 1992 (aged 21)	(Kyrgyz Football Union) Abdysh-Ata Kant
4	DF	Kairat Kolbaev	3 March 1993 (aged 21)	(Kyrgyz Football Union) Ala-Too Naryn
5	MF	Cholponbek Esenkul Uulu	15 January 1986 (aged 28)	(Kyrgyz Football Union) Abdysh-Ata Kant
6	DF	Sanzhar Sharsheev	4 September 1994 (aged 20)	(Kyrgyz Football Union) Dordoi Bishkek
7	DF	Azamat Baimatov	3 December 1989 (aged 24)	(Kyrgyz Football Union) Dordoi Bishkek
8	MF	Aziz Sydykov	23 June 1992 (aged 22)	(Kyrgyz Football Union) Abdysh-Ata Kant
9	FW	Farhat Musabekov	3 January 1994 (aged 20)	(Kyrgyz Football Union) Abdysh-Ata Kant
10	MF	Avazbek Otkeev	4 December 1993 (aged 20)	(Kyrgyz Football Union) Dordoi Bishkek
11	MF	Nurkal Sataev	10 July 1992 (aged 22)	(Kyrgyz Football Union) Alga Bishkek
12	MF	Mirbek Kudaiberdiev	16 November 1994 (aged 19)	(Kyrgyz Football Union) Abdysh-Ata Kant
13	MF	Murolimzhon Akhmedov	5 January 1992 (aged 22)	(Kyrgyz Football Union) Alay Osh
14	MF	Kairat Zhyrgalbek Uulu	13 January 1993 (aged 21)	(Kyrgyz Football Union) Abdysh-Ata Kant
16	GK	Valery Kashuba	14 September 1984 (aged 30)	(Kyrgyz Football Union) Alay Osh
18	FW	Evgenii Doroginski	12 March 1991 (aged 23)	(Kyrgyz Football Union) Abdysh-Ata Kant
21	DF	Marat Ajiniyazov	1 March 1991 (aged 23)	(Kyrgyz Football Union) Abdysh-Ata Kant
22	MF	Bekmyrza Duvanaev	12 February 1993 (aged 21)	(Kyrgyz Football Union) Alay Osh
24	MF	Manas Karipov	17 March 1995 (aged 19)	(Kyrgyz Football Union) Abdysh-Ata Kant
25	DF	Valery Kichin	12 October 1992 (aged 21)	(Russian Football Union) Anzhi Makhachkala
29	DF	Akram Umarov	7 February 1994 (aged 20)	(Kyrgyz Football Union) Abdysh-Ata Kant
30	GK	Maksim Zinchenko	13 March 1991 (aged 23)	(Kyrgyz Football Union) Dordoi Bishkek

=== Vietnam ===
Coach: (Japan) Toshiya Miura

No.	Pos.	Player	Date of birth (age)	Club
1	GK	Trần Bửu Ngọc	26 February 1991 (aged 23)	(Vietnam Football Federation) TĐCS Đồng Tháp
2	DF	Nguyễn Thanh Hiền	16 April 1993 (aged 21)	(Vietnam Football Federation) TĐCS Đồng Tháp
3	DF	Quế Ngọc Hải	15 May 1993 (aged 21)	(Vietnam Football Federation) Sông Lam Nghệ An
4	DF	Phạm Hoàng Lâm	6 March 1993 (aged 21)	(Vietnam Football Federation) Đồng Tâm Long An
5	DF	Đào Duy Khánh	30 January 1994 (aged 20)	(Vietnam Football Federation) Hà Nội T&T
6	DF	Nguyễn Văn Mạnh	16 June 1993 (aged 21)	(Vietnam Football Federation) Sông Lam Nghệ An
7	MF	Ngô Hoàng Thịnh	21 April 1992 (aged 22)	(Vietnam Football Federation) Sông Lam Nghệ An
8	MF	Vũ Minh Tuấn	19 September 1990 (aged 24)	(Vietnam Football Federation) Than Quảng Ninh
9	MF	Mạc Hồng Quân	1 January 1992 (aged 22)	(Vietnam Football Federation) Hùng Vương An Giang
10	MF	Huỳnh Văn Thanh	20 December 1992 (aged 21)	(Vietnam Football Federation) Bình Định
11	FW	Giang Trần Quách Tân	8 March 1992 (aged 22)	(Vietnam Football Federation) SHB Đà Nẵng
12	FW	Nguyễn Hữu Khôi	1 April 1992 (aged 22)	(Vietnam Football Federation) Nam Định
13	MF	Đào Nhật Minh	27 April 1992 (aged 22)	(Vietnam Football Federation) Than Quảng Ninh
14	MF	Nguyễn Huy Hùng	2 March 1992 (aged 22)	(Vietnam Football Federation) Hà Nội
15	DF	Nguyễn Minh Tùng	9 August 1992 (aged 22)	(Vietnam Football Federation) Vissai Ninh Bình
16	MF	Võ Huy Toàn	15 March 1993 (aged 21)	(Vietnam Football Federation) SHB Đà Nẵng
17	MF	Hồ Ngọc Thắng	10 February 1994 (aged 20)	(Vietnam Football Federation) SHB Đà Nẵng
18	GK	Lê Văn Nghĩa	14 June 1994 (aged 20)	(Vietnam Football Federation) Hà Nội T&T
19	FW	Trần Phi Sơn	14 March 1992 (aged 22)	(Vietnam Football Federation) Sông Lam Nghệ An
20	GK	Nguyễn Văn Công	1 August 1992 (aged 22)	(Vietnam Football Federation) Hà Nội T&T
