= Moon Chang-jin =

South Korean footballer (born 1993)

Personal information
- Full name: Moon Chang-jin
- Date of birth: 12 July 1993 (age 33)
- Place of birth: Gwangyang, Jeonnam, South Korea
- Height: 1.70 m (5 ft 7 in)
- Position: Attacking midfielder

Team information
- Current team: Gangneung Citizen
- Number: 28

Youth career
- Pohang Steelers

Senior career*
Years	Team	Apps	(Gls)
2012–2016	Pohang Steelers	69	(10)
2017	Gangwon FC	29	(6)
2017–2018	Shabab Al Ahli	15	(1)
2018–2019	Gangwon FC	10	(1)
2019–2022	Incheon United	20	(2)
2020–2021	→ Gimcheon Sangmu (loan)	21	(2)
2022	Busan IPark	5	(0)
2023	Seongnam FC	6	(0)
2024	PSS Sleman	15	(0)
2025	Bekasi City	5	(1)
2025–	Gangneung Citizen	4	(0)

International career
2011–2012	South Korea U20	9	(7)
2013–2016	South Korea U23	31	(16)
Medal record
Representing South Korea
Men's football
AFC U-23 Championship
Silver medal – second place	2016 Qatar	Team
AFC U-19 Championship
Gold medal – first place	2012 United Arab Emirates	Team
- * Club domestic league appearances and goals as of 6 September 2025

- Moon Chang-jin
- Hangul: 문창진
- Hanja: 文昶辰
- RR: Mun Changjin
- MR: Mun Ch'angjin

Moon Chang-jin (Korean: 문창진; born 12 July 1993) is a South Korean professional footballer who plays as an attacking midfielder for K3 League club Gangneung Citizen.

== Honours ==
Pohang Steelers

- K League 1: 2013
- Korean FA Cup: 2012, 2013

South Korea U20

- AFC U-19 Championship: 2012

South Korea U23

- AFC U-23 Championship runner-up: 2016
