= Yousef Al-Alousi =

Jordanian footballer

Personal information
- Full name: Yousef Raed Al-Alousi
- Date of birth: 17 December 1993 (age 32)
- Place of birth: Iraq
- Height: 1.83 m (6 ft 0 in)
- Position: Right-back

Team information
- Current team: Zakho SC
- Number: 14

Youth career
- 2006–2011: Al-Faisaly SC

Senior career*
| Years | Team | Apps | (Gls) |
| 2011– | Al-Faisaly SC | | (0) |
| 2014–2015 | → Al-Naft SC (loan) | | (0) |
| 2016–2017 | → Naft Al-Wasat SC (loan) | | (0) |
| 2018–2019 | Shabab Al-Ordon | | |
| 2019–2023 | Amanat Baghdad | | (2) |
| 2023– | Zakho SC | | (0) |

International career
| 2012 | Jordan U19 | | |
| 2016 | Jordan U23 | | |
- * Club domestic league appearances and goals

Yousef Raed Al-Alousi (Arabic: يُوسُف رَائِد الْأَلُوسِيّ; born 17 December 1993) is a Jordanian footballer who is a defender for Zakho SC in the Iraq Stars League. Born in Iraq to Jordanian and Iraqi parents, he represents Jordan internationally.
