= Mohamed Saaif =

Maldivian footballer

Personal information
- Full name: Mohamed Saaif
- Date of birth: 17 March 1994 (age 32)
- Place of birth: Maldives
- Position: Defender

Team information
- Current team: Buru Sports
- Number: 3

Youth career
- 2012–2013: Valencia
- 2014: Maziya

Senior career*
Years	Team	Apps	(Gls)
2012–2013	Valencia		
2014–2015	Maziya		
2016	New Radiant		
2016	Victory		
2017–2022	Green Streets		
2012–	Buru Sports		

International career^{‡}
2012–2016	Maldives U23	2	(0)
2016–	Maldives	6	(0)
- * Club domestic league appearances and goals ‡ National team caps and goals as of 15 June 2021

Mohamed Saaif (born 17 March 1994) is a Maldivian professional footballer who plays as a defender for Buru Sports Club.

== Career ==
Saaif joined Valencia in 2012 and played at youth level before breaking through into the first team, under coach Ibrahim Asif. He also played for Maziya, before joining New Radiant in 2016. Saaif left New Radiant for Victory Sports Club in the mid-season and later joined Club Green Streets in the following year.

== International ==
Saaif represented Maldives at the under 23 level before making his senior debut against Cambodia in the 2016 Bangabandhu Cup.
