= Abdurahman Yousef =

Emirati footballer (born 1993)

Personal information
- Full name: Abdurahman Yousef Khamis Mubarak
- Date of birth: 28 August 1993 (age 33)
- Place of birth: United Arab Emirates
- Height: 1.75 m (5 ft 9 in)
- Position: Defender

Team information
- Current team: Khor Fakkan
- Number: 6

Youth career
- Al Wasl

Senior career*
Years	Team	Apps	(Gls)
2010–2012	Al Wasl	4	(0)
2012–2015	Al-Ahli	1	(0)
2015–2020	Al Dhafra	85	(4)
2020–2022	Al-Nasr	3	(0)
2022–	Khor Fakkan	8	(0)

International career
- UAE U23
- * Club domestic league appearances and goals

Abdurahman Yousef (Arabic: عبد الرحمن يوسف; born 28 August 1993) is an Emirati footballer. He currently plays as a defender for Khor Fakkan.
