= Gang Yoon-goo =

South Korean footballer

Personal information
- Full name: Gang Yoon-goo
- Date of birth: February 8, 1993 (age 33)
- Place of birth: South Korea
- Height: 1.72 m (5 ft 7 1/2 in)
- Position: Defender

Team information
- Current team: Incheon United FC
- Number: 6

Senior career*
Years	Team	Apps	(Gls)
2013	Vissel Kobe	1	(0)
2014	→ Oita Trinita (loan)	0	(0)
2015	→ Ehime FC (loan)	0	(0)
2016	Cheonju City		
2017	Mokpo City	24	(0)
2018–2019	Daegu FC	33	(1)
2020–	Incheon United FC	45	(0)
- * Club domestic league appearances and goals as of 31 August 2022

Gang Yoon-goo (Korean: 강윤구; born February 8, 1993) is a South Korean football player who has played in the J2 League and currently plays for Daegu FC in the K League 1.

== Playing career ==
Gang Yoon-goo played for J2 League club; Vissel Kobe, Oita Trinita and Ehime FC from 2013 to 2015.

== Honours ==
South Korea U-20

- AFC U-19 Championship: 2012
