= Muhammad Sohail =

Pakistani footballer (born 2001)

Personal information
- Full name: Muhammad Sohail Khan
- Date of birth: 4 September 2001 (age 25)
- Place of birth: Karachi, Pakistan
- Height: 1.78 m (5 ft 10 in)
- Position: Left-back

Team information
- Current team: AC Hospitalense

Senior career*
Years	Team	Apps	(Gls)
2018–2022	Pakistan Civil Aviation Authority		
2023–2025	Khan Research Laboratories		
2026–	AC Hospitalense		

International career^{‡}
2020	Pakistan U20	4	(0)
2023–	Pakistan U23	1	(0)
2023–	Pakistan	2	(0)
- * Club domestic league appearances and goals as of 23:00, 17 February 2024 (UTC) ‡ National team caps and goals as of 23:00, 21 March 2024 (UTC)

Muhammad Sohail Khan (born 4 September 2001) is a Pakistani footballer who plays as a left-back for Tercera Catalana club Atlètic Centro Hospitalense, and the Pakistan national team.

== Club career ==
=== Pakistan Civil Aviation Authority ===
In 2018, Sohail was a member of Pakistan Civil Aviation Authority. He made 23 appearances for the club in the 2018–19 Pakistan Premier League season. In the middle of the crisis and bans on the Pakistan Football Federation by FIFA, he again participated in the 2021–22 season, making 12 appearances and scoring three goals, until the league was cancelled shortly after starting.

=== Khan Research Laboratories ===
Sohail moved to Khan Research Laboratories in 2023.

=== Hospitalense ===
In 2026, Sohail started playing for Spanish Tercera Catalana club Atlètic Centro Hospitalense.

== International career ==
Sohail was a member of the Pakistan street children football team during the Norway Cup in 2016. After having topped their group and reaching the knockout stages unbeaten at the Norway Cup, a youth football competition with more than 200 teams, the Pakistan team suffered a defeat as they failed to make it into the quarter-finals by losing 0–3 to Sotra SK youth team in their round-of-16 match in Oslo.

Sohail represented Pakistan at the youth level in 2020 AFC U-19 Championship qualification. He went on to make four appearances in the campaign.

In August 2022 Sohail was called up for a trials with the senior national team. In November the same year, he was included in Pakistan's squad for a friendly against Nepal, Pakistan's first fixture in nearly three-and-a-half years because of the Pakistan Football Federation's suspension by FIFA.

In October 2023 he represented Pakistan U23 in AFC U23 Asian Cup Qualifiers. He made his senior international debut with Pakistan in the second round of the 2026 FIFA World Cup qualification in a 6–1 home defeat against Tajikistan.

== Career statistics ==
=== International ===
As of 21 March 2024

Appearances and goals by national team and year
National team	Year	Apps	Goals
Pakistan	2023	1	0
Pakistan	2024	1	0
Total		2	0
