= Ngô Xuân Toàn =

Vietnamese footballer

- 2019

Personal information
- Full name: Ngô Xuân Toàn
- Date of birth: 10 February 1993 (age 33)
- Place of birth: Hưng Nguyên, Nghệ An, Vietnam
- Height: 1.67 m (5 ft 6 in)
- Position: Midfielder

Team information
- Current team: Hồng Lĩnh Hà Tĩnh
- Number: 6

Youth career
- 2006–2015: Sông Lam Nghệ An

Senior career*
Years	Team	Apps	(Gls)
2016–2019	Sông Lam Nghệ An	17	(2)
2017	→ Phú Yên (loan)	2	(0)
2019–2020	Sài Gòn	20	(0)
2021	Quảng Nam	7	(0)
2022–	Hồng Lĩnh Hà Tĩnh	36	(0)
- * Club domestic league appearances and goals as of 27 August 2023

Ngô Xuân Toàn (born 10 February 1993) is a Vietnamese footballer who plays as a midfielder for V.League 1 club Hồng Lĩnh Hà Tĩnh.

Xuân Toàn is a graduate of Song Lam Nghe An's youth academy and made his senior debut for the club in 2016. He spent the 2017 season on loan to V.League 2 club Phu Yen.
