= Hamad Ibrahim =

Emirati footballer (born 1994)

Personal information
- Full name: Hamad Ibrahim Abdurahman
- Date of birth: 18 January 1994 (age 32)
- Place of birth: United Arab Emirates
- Height: 1.73 m (5 ft 8 in)
- Position: Midfielder

Youth career
- Al-Sharjah

Senior career*
Years	Team	Apps	(Gls)
2012–2020	Al-Sharjah		
2019	→ Dibba Al-Fujairah (loan)		
2019–2020	→ Al-Hamriyah (loan)		
2020–2022	Hatta		
2023–2024	Al Rams		
- * Club domestic league appearances and goals

Hamad Ibrahim (Arabic: حمد إبراهيم; born 18 January 1994) is an Emirati footballer. He currently plays as a midfielder.
