= Thanakorn Saipunya =

Thai footballer (born 1993)

Thanakorn Saipanya
Personal information
- Full name: Thanakorn Saipanya
- Date of birth: 5 April 1993 (age 33)
- Place of birth: Bangkok, Thailand
- Height: 1.81 m (5 ft 11 1/2 in)
- Position: Centre back

Team information
- Current team: Rajpracha
- Number: 4

Youth career
- 2009–2010: Bangkok

Senior career*
Years	Team	Apps	(Gls)
2011–2012	Bangkok	26	(2)
2012–2015	BEC Tero Sasana	0	(0)
2013	→ RBAC (loan)	16	(0)
2014	→ Samut Songkhram (loan)	9	(0)
2015	→ Police United (loan)	13	(2)
2016–2018	Port	8	(0)
2017	→ Songkhla United (loan)	22	(0)
2018	→ Khon Kaen (loan)	16	(0)
2019–	Rajpracha	19	(0)

International career
2011–2012	Thailand U19	10	(0)
2015	Thailand U23	1	(0)
- * Club domestic league appearances and goals as of 02:07, 30 October 2018 (UTC)

Thanakorn Saipanya (Thai: ธนกร สายปัญญา, born 5 April 1993) is a Thai footballer who plays as a defender, and was captain in the 2012 AFC U-19 Championship.

== Honours ==
=== International ===
Thailand U-19

- AFF U-19 Youth Championship Champions (1); 2011
