= Khalid Salim El Abed =

Dutch association football player

Personal information
- Date of birth: 24 May 1993 (age 33)
- Place of birth: Amsterdam, Netherlands
- Position: Defender

Youth career
- –2012: Ajax

Senior career*
Years	Team	Apps	(Gls)
2013–2014	TOP Oss	4	(0)
–2017	Ter Leede		
- * Club domestic league appearances and goals

Khalid Salim El Abed (born 24 May 1993) is a former footballer who is last known to have played as a defender for Ter Leede. Born in the Netherlands, he was a youth international for Jordan.

== Career ==
=== Club career ===
As a youth player, he joined the youth academy of Dutch top flight side Ajax. In 2013, El Abed signed for TOP Oss in the Dutch second tier, where he made 4 league appearances and scored 0 goals. On 23 August 2013, he debuted for TOP Oss during a 1–0 win over Fortuna Sittard. After that, El Abed signed for Dutch fifth division club Ter Leede.

=== International career ===
He is eligible to represent Jordan internationally.
