= Souksadakone Liapvisay =

Laotian footballer

Souksadakone Liapvisay (born 15 January 1993, in Vientiane) is a Laotian football player. He plays for Yotha in the Lao League. He is a member of the Laos national football team.
