= Ham Seok-min =

South Korean footballer (born 1994)

Seok-Min Ham
Personal information
- Full name: Seok-Min Ham
- Date of birth: 14 February 1994 (age 32)
- Place of birth: South Korea
- Height: 1.90 m (6 ft 3 in)
- Position: Goalkeeper

Team information
- Current team: Gangwon FC
- Number: 16

Youth career
- Gungneung Munsung High School

Senior career*
Years	Team	Apps	(Gls)
？–2014	Gyeongju HNP	3	(0)
2015–2017	Suwon Bluewings	0	(0)
2016	→ Gangwon FC (loan)	25	(0)
2018–	Gangwon FC	7	(0)

International career
2013	South Korea U-20	0	(0)
2013	South Korea U-21	2	(0)
- * Club domestic league appearances and goals as of 20 December 2019

Ham Seok-min (Korean: 함석민; born 14 February 1994) is a footballer who plays for Gangwon FC on loan from Suwon Bluewings. In 2013, he was called onto the South Korea national under-20 football team.

Finishing high school, he went to Soongsil University where he won the Goalkeeper award in 2013. Afterwards, he would head to the Korea National League. An ardent supporter of Suwon Samsung Bluewings since 2005, he revealed that 'Suwon was always the No. 1 club in his mind' after joining them.

== Trophies ==
Ham has received 1x K League Classic Runners-Up medal.

== Honours ==
South Korea U-20

- AFC U-19 Championship: 2012
