= Ali Al-Rthoom =

Jordanian footballer

Personal information
- Full name: Ali Yasser Al-Rthoom
- Date of birth: August 24, 1993 (age 33)
- Place of birth: Amman, Jordan
- Position: Defender

Team information
- Current team: Al-Baqa'a

Youth career
- Al-Baqa'a

Senior career*
Years	Team	Apps	(Gls)
2013	Al-Ahli		
2024–	Al-Baqa'a		
- * Club domestic league appearances and goals ‡ National team caps and goals as of 13 June 2017

Ali Yasser Al-Rthoom (Arabic: علي ياسر الرثوم) (born August 24, 1993) is a Jordanian football player who plays as a defender for Jordanian First Division League club Al-Baqa'a.
