= Ahmed Shambih =

Emirati footballer (born 1993)

Personal information
- Full name: Ahmed Mohammad Shambih Bilal Albalooshi
- Date of birth: 20 December 1993 (age 32)
- Place of birth: United Arab Emirates
- Height: 1.72 m (5 ft 7 1/2 in)
- Position: Goalkeeper

Team information
- Current team: Al Nasr
- Number: 12

Youth career
- 2005–2011: Al Nasr

Senior career*
Years	Team	Apps	(Gls)
2011–	Al Nasr	104	(0)

International career
2015–	United Arab Emirates	2	(0)
- * Club domestic league appearances and goals

Ahmed Shambih (Arabic:أحمد شمبيه; born 20 December 1993) is an Emirati footballer. He currently plays as a goalkeeper for Al Nasr.
