= Munther Raja =

Jordanian footballer

Personal information
- Full name: Munther Yousef Raja
- Date of birth: 22 February 1993 (age 33)
- Place of birth: Amman, Jordan
- Height: 1.81 m (5 ft 11 in)
- Position: Defender

Team information
- Current team: Shabab Al-Aqaba
- Number: 4

Youth career
- 2008–2013: Al-Wehdat

Senior career*
Years	Team	Apps	(Gls)
2013–2017	Al-Wehdat		
2016–2017	→ Al-Hussein (loan)		
2017	Al-Fahaheel		
2017–	Shabab Al-Aqaba		

International career
2011–2012	Jordan U19		
2013–2016	Jordan U23		
- * Club domestic league appearances and goals

Munther Yousef Raja (Arabic: منذر يوسف رجا; born 22 February 1993) is a Jordanian footballer who plays for Jordanian Pro League side Shabab Al-Aqaba.
