= Hassan Hamza =

Emirati footballer (born 1994)

Personal information
- Full name: Hassan Hamza Ali Hussain
- Date of birth: 10 November 1994 (age 31)
- Place of birth: Sharjah, United Arab Emirates
- Height: 1.93 m (6 ft 4 in)
- Position: Goalkeeper

Team information
- Current team: Shabab Al Ahli
- Number: 12

Youth career
- Al Shabab

Senior career*
Years	Team	Apps	(Gls)
2013–2017	Al Shabab	10	(0)
2017–	Shabab Al Ahli	40	(0)

International career
2016–	United Arab Emirates	0	(0)
- * Club domestic league appearances and goals

Hassan Hamza Ali Hussain (Arabic: حَسَن حَمْزَة عَلِيّ حُسَيْن) (born 10 November 1994) is an Emirati footballer who currently plays as a goalkeeper for Shabab Al-Ahli.
