= Walid Amber =

Emirati footballer (born 1993)

Personal information
- Full name: Walid Amber Ismael
- Date of birth: 11 January 1993 (age 33)
- Place of birth: RAK City, United Arab Emirates
- Height: 1.74 m (5 ft 8 1/2 in)
- Position: Winger

Youth career
- Emirates

Senior career*
Years	Team	Apps	(Gls)
2012–2013	Emirates	17	(1)
2013–2020	Shabab Al-Ahli	25	(1)
2015–2016	→ Emirates (loan)	22	(4)
2018–2019	→ Emirates (loan)	21	(3)
2019–2020	→ Ittihad Kalba (loan)	9	(2)
2020–2022	Ittihad Kalba	17	(0)
2022	→ Al Dhafra (loan)	9	(2)
2022–2024	Al Dhafra	48	(6)
2024–2025	Dibba Al-Hisn	8	(0)
- * Club domestic league appearances and goals

Walid Amber Esmail (Arabic:وليد عمبر) (born 11 January 1993) is an Emirati footballer. He plays as a winger.
