= Nguyễn Văn Mạnh (footballer) =

Vietnamese footballer

Personal information
- Full name: Nguyễn Văn Mạnh
- Date of birth: June 16, 1993 (age 33)
- Place of birth: Quế Phong, Nghệ An, Vietnam
- Height: 1.72 m (5 ft 8 in)
- Position: Left-back

Youth career
- 2008–2012: Sông Lam Nghệ An

Senior career*
Years	Team	Apps	(Gls)
2013	→ Bình Định (loan)	5	(0)
2014–2015	→ XSKT Cần Thơ (loan)	27	(0)
2016–2018	Sông Lam Nghệ An	32	(0)
2018	XSKT Cần Thơ	12	(0)
2019–2020	Long An	27	(0)

International career
2014–2015	Vietnam U23	1	(0)
- * Club domestic league appearances and goals

Nguyễn Văn Mạnh (born 16 June 1993) is a Vietnamese footballer who plays as a left-back for V.League 2 club Long An
