= Đào Duy Khánh =

Vietnamese footballer (born 1993)

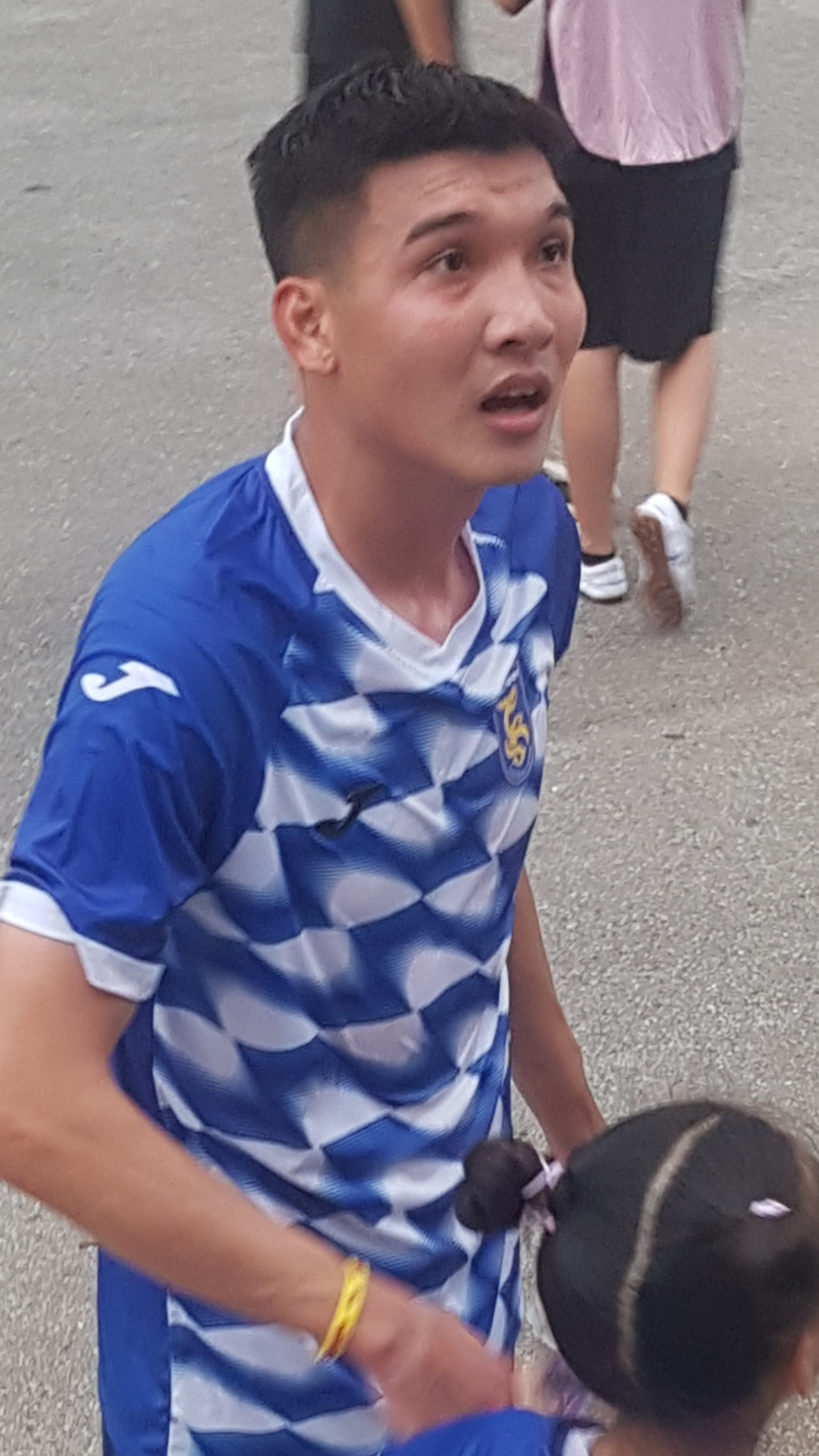
- Duy Khánh in 2024

Personal information
- Full name: Đào Duy Khánh
- Date of birth: January 30, 1993 (age 33)
- Place of birth: Từ Sơn, Bắc Ninh, Vietnam
- Height: 1.80 m (5 ft 11 in)
- Position: Centre-back

Team information
- Current team: Bắc Ninh
- Number: 6

Youth career
- 2009–2012: Hà Nội

Senior career*
Years	Team	Apps	(Gls)
2013–2018	Hà Nội	25	(1)
2018–2020	Quảng Nam	26	(0)
2021	Than Quảng Ninh	6	(0)
2022	Hải Phòng	1	(0)
2024–	Bắc Ninh		

International career
2012–2013	Vietnam U19	3	(0)
2014–2015	Vietnam U23	2	(0)
- * Club domestic league appearances and goals as of 6 July 2019

Đào Duy Khánh (born 30 January 1993) is a Vietnamese footballer who plays as a center back for Bắc Ninh.

== Honours ==
=== Clubs ===
Hanoi

- V.League 1

(gold) Winners : 2016, 2018
(silver) Runners-up : 2014, 2015

- Vietnamese Super Cup

(silver) Runners-up : 2015, 2016

- Vietnamese National Cup

(silver) Runners-up : 2015, 2016
