= Saif Khalfan =

Emirati footballer (born 1993)

Personal information
- Full name: Saif Khalfan Saeed Al-Meqbaali
- Date of birth: 31 January 1993 (age 33)
- Place of birth: United Arab Emirates
- Height: 1.82 m (6 ft 0 in)
- Position: Centre back

Youth career
- Al Jazira

Senior career*
Years	Team	Apps	(Gls)
2012–2022	Al Jazira	40	(2)
2020–2021	→ Emirates (loan)		
- * Club domestic league appearances and goals

Saif Khalfan Saeed Al-Maqbaali (Arabic:سيف خلفان) (born 31 January 1993) is an Emirati footballer who plays as a centre back.
