= Mohammad Nasseri =

Iranian footballer

Mohammad Naseri
Personal information
- Date of birth: 26 April 1993 (age 33)
- Place of birth: Mashhad, Iran
- Height: 1.92 m (6 ft 3 1/2 in)
- Position: Goalkeeper

Team information
- Current team: Shahr Raz
- Number: 1

Youth career
- –2008: Payam
- 2008–2013: Sepahan

Senior career*
Years	Team	Apps	(Gls)
2009–2014	Sepahan	0	(0)
2013–2014	→ Gostaresh Foolad (loan)	0	(0)
2014–2015	Gostaresh Foolad	0	(0)
2015–2018	Meshki Pooshan	41	(0)
2018	Padideh	3	(0)
2019	Paykan		
2020–2021	Aluminium Arak	1	(0)
2021–2024	Paykan	37	(0)
2024–	Shahr Raz	8	(0)

International career
2008–2011	Iran U17		
2010–2011	Iran U20	6	(0)
- * Club domestic league appearances and goals as of 29 October 2024

Mohammad Naseri (Persian: محمد ناصری; born 26 April 1993) is an Iranian football goalkeeper who plays for Shahr Raz in the Azadegan League.

== Club career ==
Nasseri started his career with Payam Academy. In 2008, he joined Sepahan Academy and after a season with U21 side, he promoted to first team. In Summer 2013 he joined Gostaresh Foulad on loan until end of season. At the end of 2013–14 season, he signed permanently with Gostaresh Foulad. Nasseri joined to Siah Jamegan in summer 2015. He made his professional debut for Siah Jamegan on 29 January 2016 in 2-1 win against Naft Tehran as a starter.

== Club career statistics ==
As of 29 January 2016.

Club	Division	Season	League		Hazfi Cup		Asia		Total	
Club	Division	Season	Apps	Goals	Apps	Goals	Apps	Goals	Apps	Goals
Sepahan	PGPL	2009–10	0	0	0	0	0	0	0	0
Sepahan	PGPL	2010–11	0	0	0	0	0	0	0	0
Sepahan	PGPL	2011–12	0	0	0	0	0	0	0	0
Sepahan	PGPL	2012–13	0	0	0	0	0	0	0	0
Gostaresh; Foulad	PGPL	2013–14	0	0	0	0	–	–	0	0
Gostaresh; Foulad	PGPL	2014–15	0	0	0	0	–	–	0	0
Siah Jamegan	PGPL	2015–16	1	0	0	0	–	–	1	0
Career totals			1	0	0	0	0	0	1	0
