= Salem Ali Ibrahim =

Emirati footballer (born 1993)

Salem Ali
Personal information
- Full name: Salem Ali Ibrahim Hassan Al-Hammadi
- Date of birth: 27 September 1993 (age 33)
- Place of birth: United Arab Emirates
- Height: 1.69 m (5 ft 7 in)
- Position: Midfielder

Youth career
- Al Jazira

Senior career*
Years	Team	Apps	(Gls)
2012–2018	Al Jazira	27	(1)
2018–2020	Baniyas	25	(1)
2020–2023	Khor Fakkan	36	(2)
2023	Al Bataeh	0	(0)
2023–2024	Emirates	9	(0)
2024–2025	Masfout		
- * Club domestic league appearances and goals

Salem Ali Ibrahim Hassan Al-Hammadi (Arabic:سالم علي إبراهيم حسن الحمادي) (born 27 September 1993) is an Emirati footballer. He currently plays as a midfielder.
