= Salem Rashid =

Emirati footballer (born 1993)

Personal information
- Full name: Salem Rashid Obaid Sanad Rashid
- Date of birth: 21 December 1993 (age 32)
- Place of birth: United Arab Emirates
- Height: 1.73 m (5 ft 8 in)
- Position: Right-back

Team information
- Current team: Kalba
- Number: 12

Youth career
- Al Ittihad

Senior career*
Years	Team	Apps	(Gls)
2010–2012	Ittihad Kalba	3	(0)
2012–2023	Al Jazira	160	(1)
2023–	Kalba	0	(0)

International career
2014	UAE U-23	4	(0)
2019–	UAE	4	(0)
- * Club domestic league appearances and goals as of 5 June 2022

Salem Rashid Obaid Sanad Rashid (Arabic:سالم راشد عبيد سند راشد; born 21 December 1993) is an Emirati professional footballer. He currently plays for Kalba.
