= Guo Hao =

Chinese football player

Guo Hao 郭皓
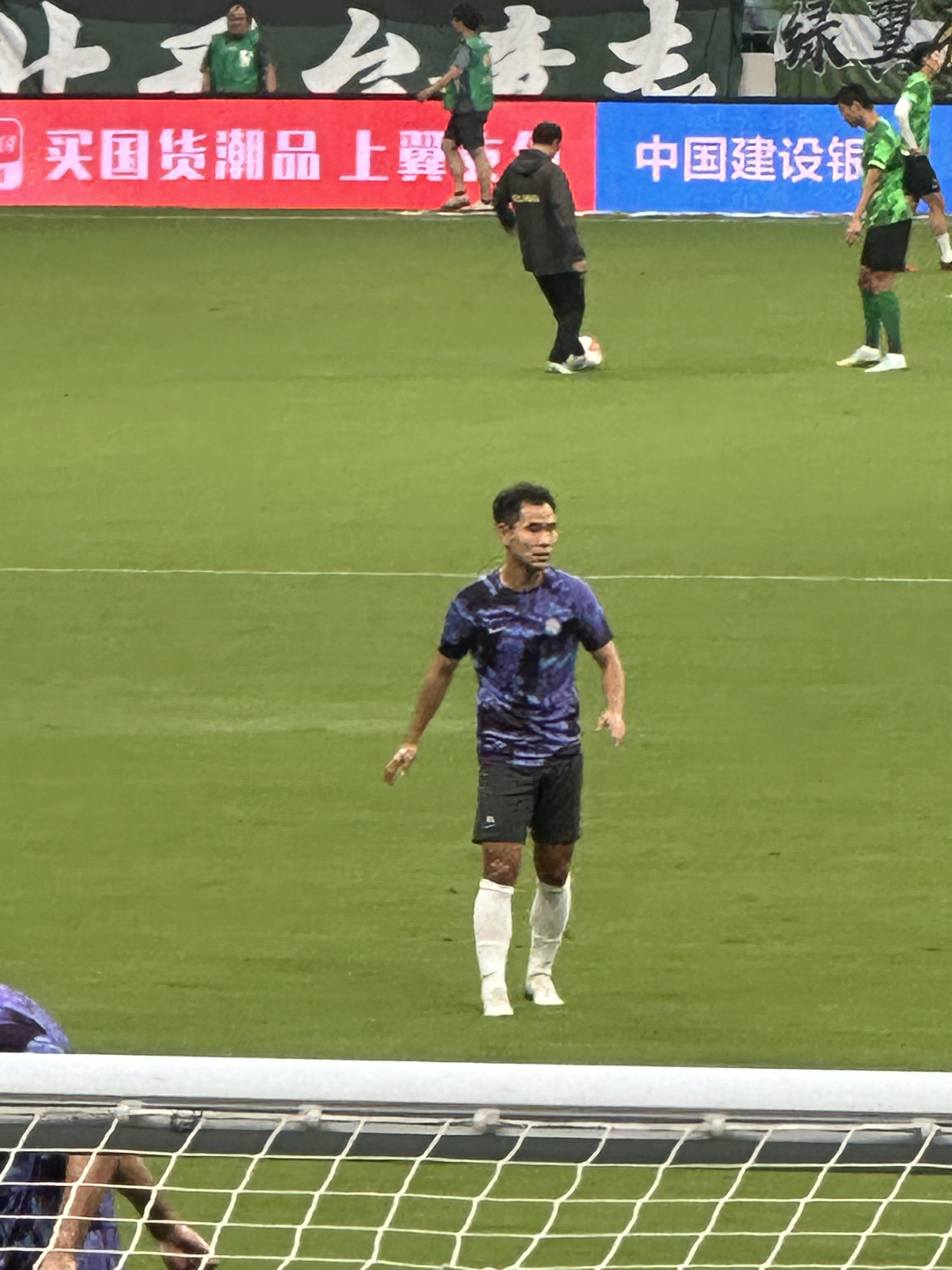
- Guo Hao in July 2024

Personal information
- Date of birth: 14 January 1993 (age 33)
- Place of birth: Tianjin, China
- Height: 1.72 m (5 ft 7 1/2 in)
- Position: Midfielder

Team information
- Current team: Tianjin Jinmen Tiger
- Number: 28

Youth career
- Locomotive
- 2010–2012: Tianjin Teda

Senior career*
Years	Team	Apps	(Gls)
2010	Jingtie Locomotive	0	(0)
2013–2020	Tianjin Teda	133	(2)
2021–2022	Cangzhou Mighty Lions	40	(0)
2023–	Tianjin Jinmen Tiger	78	(3)

International career
	China U19	7	(0)
	China U23	4	(0)
- * Club domestic league appearances and goals as of 22 November 2026

Guo Hao (Chinese: 郭皓; born 14 January 1993) is a Chinese professional football player who currently plays as a midfielder for Chinese Super League side Tianjin Jinmen Tiger.

== Club career ==
Guo Hao received organized football training at Locomotive academy. In 2010, he was promoted to Jingtie Locomotive's first team squad for the 2010 China League One. He left Locomotive in the middle of 2010 season and joined Chinese Super League side Tianjin Teda youth team system. Guo was named in the first team squad by Alexandre Guimarães in 2013. He made his senior debut on 10 July 2013 in the fourth round of 2013 Chinese FA Cup against Liaoning Whowin. His Super League debut came on 3 November 2013 in a game against Shanghai Shenxin, coming on as a substitute for Wang Xinxin in the 73rd minute. On 19 July 2015, he scored his first senior goal in a 4–3 home defeat to Guizhou Renhe.

On 8 April 2021, Guo joined top-tier club Cangzhou Mighty Lions for the start of the 2021 Chinese Super League season. He would make his debut in a league game on 21 April 2021 against Qingdao F.C. in a 2–1 defeat. Despite the loss he would go on to establish himself a regular within the team by making 18 appearances throughout the season. After two seasons at Cangzhou he would return to his previous club Tianjin, with them renamed as Tianjin Jinmen Tiger on 30 March 2023.

== Career statistics ==
Statistics accurate as of match played 22 November 2025.

Appearances and goals by club, season and competition
Club	Season	League			National Cup		Continental		Other		Total	
Club	Season	Division	Apps	Goals	Apps	Goals	Apps	Goals	Apps	Goals	Apps	Goals
Jingtie Locomotive	2010	China League Two	0	0	-		-		-		0	0
Tianjin Teda	2013	Chinese Super League	1	0	1	0	-		-		2	0
Tianjin Teda	2014	Chinese Super League	18	0	1	0	-		-		19	0
Tianjin Teda	2015	Chinese Super League	16	1	2	0	-		-		18	1
Tianjin Teda	2016	Chinese Super League	20	0	1	0	-		-		21	0
Tianjin Teda	2017	Chinese Super League	17	0	0	0	-		-		17	0
Tianjin Teda	2018	Chinese Super League	25	1	1	0	-		-		26	1
Tianjin Teda	2019	Chinese Super League	20	0	1	0	-		-		21	0
Tianjin Teda	2020	Chinese Super League	16	0	4	0	-		-		20	0
Tianjin Teda	Total		133	2	11	0	0	0	0	0	144	2
Cangzhou Mighty Lions	2021	Chinese Super League	18	0	0	0	-		-		18	0
Cangzhou Mighty Lions	2022	Chinese Super League	22	0	1	0	-		-		23	0
Cangzhou Mighty Lions	Total		40	0	1	0	0	0	0	0	41	0
Tianjin Jinmen Tiger	2023	Chinese Super League	23	1	2	0	-		-		25	1
Tianjin Jinmen Tiger	2024	Chinese Super League	26	1	3	1	-		-		29	2
Tianjin Jinmen Tiger	2025	Chinese Super League	19	1	2	0	-		-		21	1
Tianjin Jinmen Tiger	Total		68	3	7	1	0	0	0	0	75	4
Career total			241	5	19	1	0	0	0	0	260	6
