= Abdullah Al-Naqbi =

Emirati footballer (born 1993)

Personal information
- Full name: Abdullah Ali Hassan Mohamed Al-Naqbi
- Date of birth: 28 April 1993 (age 33)
- Place of birth: Khor Fakkan, United Arab Emirates
- Height: 1.72 m (5 ft 8 in)
- Position: Midfielder

Team information
- Current team: Khor Fakkan
- Number: 40

Youth career
- 2005–2010: Al Khaleej

Senior career*
Years	Team	Apps	(Gls)
2010–2012	Al Khaleej		
2012–2018	Al Dhafra	68	(1)
2017–2018	→ Al-Wasl (loan)	17	(1)
2018–2024	Shabab Al-Ahli	83	(1)
2024–	Khor Fakkan	0	(0)

International career^{‡}
2014–2016	United Arab Emirates U23	6	(0)
2019–	United Arab Emirates	2	(0)
- * Club domestic league appearances and goals as of 13 March 2020 ‡ National team caps and goals as of 26 March 2019

Abdullah Al-Naqbi (Arabic: عبد الله النقبي; born 28 April 1993) is an Emirati international footballer who plays as a midfielder for Emirati club Khor Fakkan.
