= Abdullah Al-Arraf =

Saudi Arabian footballer (born 1995)

Abdullah Al Arraf
Personal information
- Full name: Abdullah Al Arraf Assiri
- Date of birth: June 3, 1995 (age 31)
- Place of birth: Mecca, Saudi Arabia
- Height: 1.84 m (6 ft 1/2 in)
- Position: Goalkeeper

Team information
- Current team: Hetten

Youth career
- Al-Wehda

Senior career*
Years	Team	Apps	(Gls)
2014–2018	Al-Wehda	26	(0)
2018	Al-Taawoun	0	(0)
2019–2020	Najran		
2020	Al-Taqadom		
2020	Najran		
2021–2022	Al-Jubail		
2022–2023	Al-Ansar		
2023–2024	Wej		
2024–2025	Tuwaiq		
2026–	Hetten		

International career
- Saudi Arabia-23
- * Club domestic league appearances and goals as of 16 December 2018 (UTC)

Abdullah Al Arraf (Arabic: عبد الله آل عراف; born 3 June 1995) is a Saudi Arabian professional footballer who currently plays for Hetten as a goalkeeper.

== Honours ==
Al-Wehda

- Prince Mohammad bin Salman League: 2017–18
