= 2012 AFC U-19 Championship qualification =

Tournament details
- Teams: 36 (from 1 confederation)

The qualification for the 2012 AFC U-19 Championship.

== Format ==
The teams have been divided into two zones – West (23) and East (16). The teams will be divided into seven groups of six and five teams each. West Zone will have three groups of six and one of five teams while East will have one group of six teams each and two of five. Top two teams from each of the groups and third best team from West and East zones will qualify for the tournament proper.

== Seedings ==
The draw for the 2012 AFC U-19 Championship qualification will take place at AFC House on 30 March 2011.

West Asia
(Ranked 1st to 21st)
1. Saudi Arabia
2. Uzbekistan
3. United Arab Emirates
4. Bahrain
5. Syria
6. Iran
7. Jordan
8. Iraq
9. Yemen
10. Oman
11. Tajikistan
12. Pakistan
13. Qatar
14. Palestine
15. India
16. Bangladesh
17. Kuwait
18. Bhutan
19. Lebanon
20. Maldives
21. Turkmenistan
East Asia
(Ranked 1st to 16th)
1. North Korea
2. Australia
3. South Korea
4. Japan
5. China
6. Vietnam
7. Thailand
8. Indonesia
9. Malaysia
10. Myanmar
11. Singapore
12. Macau
13. Guam
14. Laos
15. Chinese Taipei

- Brunei – Suspended

Six teams will not take part in this edition: Cambodia, Kyrgyzstan, Mongolia, Philippines, Sri Lanka, Timor-Leste.Afghanistan,Hong Kong,Nepal withdrew.

== Groups ==
=== Group A ===
All matches were played in Dhaka, Bangladesh (UTC+6).

Team	Pld	W	D	L	GF	GA	GD	Pts
Iraq	4	4	0	0	22	3	+19	12
Saudi Arabia	4	3	0	1	21	3	+18	9
Oman	4	2	0	2	6	8	−2	6
Bangladesh (H)	4	1	0	3	3	11	−8	3
Maldives	4	0	0	4	0	27	−27	0
Nepal (W)	0	0	0	0	0	0	0	0

(W) ?
25 October 2011
16:00

Oman	0 – 4	Saudi Arabia
	Report	Al Shehri 43', 75'; Al Safari 64'; Bassas 90'

Bangabandhu National Stadium, Dhaka
Attendance: 300
Referee: Yadollah Jahanbazi (Iran)
25 October 2011
19:00

Bangladesh	3 – 0	Maldives
Rana 11', 24'; Abdul Malek 70'	Report

Bangabandhu National Stadium, Dhaka
Attendance: 1,300
Referee: Sgt Win Cho (Myanmar)

27 October 2011
16:00

Oman	4 – 0	Maldives
Hajri 30'; Al-Hamhami 41' (pen.); Al-Mushaifri 47'; Al Habsi 86'	Report

Bangabandhu National Stadium, Dhaka
Attendance: 2,500
Referee: Ng Kai Lam (Hong Kong)
27 October 2011
19:00

Iraq	6 – 0	Bangladesh
Ismail 10' (pen.); Qasim 22'; Kadhim 53'; Abdul-Raheem 72'; Fendi 85', 86'	Report

Bangabandhu National Stadium, Dhaka
Attendance: 6,000
Referee: Suleiman Jaber (Jordan)

29 October 2011
16:00

Maldives	0 – 9	Iraq
	Report	Meteab 4', 90+2'; Shokan 7'; Abdul-Raheem 24', 57'; Fendi 33'; Ismail 66', 86'; Kamel 77'

Bangabandhu National Stadium, Dhaka
Attendance: 500
Referee: Jameel Abdulhusin (Bahrain)
29 October 2011
19:00

Saudi Arabia	4 – 0	Bangladesh
Al-Muwallad 13', 45+1'; Al-Shehri 32'; Mobarki 80'	Report

Bangabandhu National Stadium, Dhaka
Attendance: 3,000
Referee: Sgt Win Cho (Myanmar)

31 October 2011
16:00

Maldives	0 – 11	Saudi Arabia
	Report	Al-Zubaidi 3', 28'; Mobarki 14', 21'; Al-Shehri 40', 56', 65'; Al-Olayan 58', 63'; Al-Muwallad 60'; Asiri 69'

Bangabandhu National Stadium, Dhaka
Attendance: 200
Referee: Ng Kai Lam (Hong Kong)
31 October 2011
19:00

Iraq	4 – 1	Oman
Kamel 12'; Qasim 17', 77'; Kadhim 22'	Report	Al Farsi 47'

Bangabandhu National Stadium, Dhaka
Attendance: 1,000
Referee: Yadollah Jahanbazi (Iran)

2 November 2011
16:00

Saudi Arabia	2 – 3	Iraq
Al-Shehri 15'; Madu 45+1'	Report	Shokan 9', 71'; Ismail 38'

Bangabandhu National Stadium, Dhaka
Attendance: 1,500
Referee: Jameel Abdulhusin (Bahrain)
2 November 2011
19:00

Oman	1 – 0	Bangladesh
Al-Hamhami 21' (pen.)	Report

Bangabandhu National Stadium, Dhaka
Attendance: 2,000
Referee: Suleiman Jaber (Jordan)

=== Group B ===
All matches were played in Doha, Qatar (UTC+3).

Team	Pld	W	D	L	GF	GA	GD	Pts
Qatar (H)	5	3	1	1	9	3	+6	10 (Note: Qatar, Kuwait, and Jordan are ranked by their head-to-head results.)
Kuwait	5	3	1	1	3	1	+2	10
Jordan	5	3	1	1	11	2	+9	10
Bahrain	5	2	1	2	7	6	+1	7
Tajikistan	5	2	0	3	10	11	−1	6
Bhutan	5	0	0	5	0	17	−17	0

Notes:

Head-to-head results
Team	Pld	W	D	L	GF	GA	GD	Pts
Qatar	2	1	1	0	1	0	+1	4
Kuwait	2	1	0	1	1	1	0	3
Jordan	2	0	1	1	0	1	−1	1

25 October 2011
16:10

Tajikistan	0 – 4	Bahrain
	Report	Suliman 45'; Jamal 51', 59'; Muthanna 66'

Qatar SC Stadium, Doha
Attendance: 50
Referee: Ali Sabbagh (Lebanon)
25 October 2011
16:10

Jordan	0 – 1	Kuwait
	Report	Al-Fahad 70'

Al-Wakrah Sports Club, Doha
Attendance: 200
Referee: Çarymyrat Gurbanow (Turkmenistan)
25 October 2011
18:45

Qatar	3 – 0	Bhutan
Al Kuwari 63'; Al-Khalaqi 73'; Al-Yazidi 84'	Report

Qatar SC Stadium, Doha
Attendance: 200
Referee: Hedayat Mombeni (Iran)

27 October 2011
16:10

Bahrain	0 – 0	Kuwait
	Report

Qatar SC Stadium, Doha
Attendance: 50
Referee: Ibrahim Al Hosni (Oman)
27 October 2011
16:10

Tajikistan	6 – 0	Bhutan
Sharipov 20'; Rakhmatov 73'; Saidov 81', 83', 85'; Khotam 90+3'	Report

Al-Wakrah Sports Club, Doha
Attendance: 150
Referee: Hedayat Mombeni (Iran)
27 October 2011
18:45

Jordan	0 – 0	Qatar
	Report

Qatar SC Stadium, Doha
Attendance: 250
Referee: Vladislav Tseytlin (Uzbekistan)

30 October 2011
16:10

Kuwait	1 – 0	Tajikistan
Al Qabandi 82'	Report

Al-Wakrah Sports Club, Doha
Attendance: 100
Referee: Ali Sabbagh (Lebanon)
30 October 2011
16:10

Bhutan	0 – 4	Jordan
	Report	Sariweh 9'; Al-Bashtawi 19', 61'; Raja 54' (pen.)

Qatar SC Stadium, Doha
Attendance: 50
Referee: Ibrahim Al Hosni (Oman)
30 October 2011
18:45

Bahrain	0 – 3	Qatar
	Report	Al-Yazidi 22', 40'; Barakat 87'

Qatar SC Stadium, Doha
Attendance: 250
Referee: Çarymyrat Gurbanow (Turkmenistan)

1 November 2011
16:10

Qatar	1 – 0	Kuwait
Al-Khalaqi 7'	Report

Qatar SC Stadium, Doha
Attendance: 200
Referee: Vladislav Tseytlin (Uzbekistan)
1 November 2011
16:10

Jordan	4 – 1	Tajikistan
Al-Bashtawi 6', 61'; Sariweh 19', 71'	Report	Rakhmatov 65'

Al-Wakrah Sports Club, Doha
Attendance: 150
Referee: Hedayat Mombeni (Iran)
1 November 2011
18:45

Bhutan	0 – 3	Bahrain
	Report	Jamal 29'; Salman 30'; Helal 45' (pen.)

Qatar SC Stadium, Doha
Attendance: 50
Referee: Ali Sabbagh (Lebanon)

4 November 2011
16:10

Kuwait	1 – 0	Bhutan
Al-Fahad 50'	Report

Qatar SC Stadium, Doha
Attendance: 50
Referee: Çarymyrat Gurbanow (Turkmenistan)
4 November 2011
16:10

Bahrain	0 – 3	Jordan
	Report	Muath 23'; Sariweh 34'; Al-Emlah 61'

Al-Wakrah Sports Club, Doha
Attendance: 150
Referee: Vladislav Tseytlin (Uzbekistan)
4 November 2011
18:45

Tajikistan	3 – 2	Qatar
Khotam 19', 49'; Rakhmatov 83'	Report	Al Kuwari 34'; Al-Khalaqi 90+3'

Qatar SC Stadium, Doha
Attendance: 200
Referee: Ibrahim Al Hosni (Oman)

=== Group C ===
All matches were played in Tehran, Iran (UTC+3:30).

Team	Pld	W	D	L	GF	GA	GD	Pts
Iran (H)	4	4	0	0	14	0	+14	12
Uzbekistan	4	3	0	1	7	4	+3	9
India	4	1	0	3	5	8	−3	3
Turkmenistan	4	1	0	3	4	10	−6	3
Pakistan	4	1	0	3	3	11	−8	3
Afghanistan (W)	0	0	0	0	0	0	0	0

31 October 2011
15:30

Pakistan	0 – 3	Uzbekistan
	Report	Makhstaliev 22', 25', 34'

Takhti Stadium, Tehran
Attendance: 100
Referee: Mohammed Hassan (United Arab Emirates)
31 October 2011
18:30

India	3 – 1	Turkmenistan
Fernandes 39'; Malsawmfela 60'; Das 82'	Report	Myradow 58'

Takhti Stadium, Tehran
Attendance: 25
Referee: Ali Sabah Adday Al-Qaysi (Iraq)

2 November 2011
15:30

Pakistan	1 – 2	Turkmenistan
Ahmed 24'	Report	Durdyýew 60' (pen.); Saparow 69'

Takhti Stadium, Tehran
Attendance: 25
Referee: Mohammad Abu Loum (Jordan)
2 November 2011
18:30

Iran	3 – 0	India
Abdollahzadeh 8'; Jahanbakhsh 67', 81'	Report

Takhti Stadium, Tehran
Attendance: 50
Referee: Dmitriy Mashentsev (Kyrgyzstan)

4 November 2011
15:30

Uzbekistan	2 – 1	India
Kozak 32', 88'	Report	Halder 60'

Takhti Stadium, Tehran
Attendance: 100
Referee: Ali Shaban (Kuwait)
4 November 2011
18:30

Turkmenistan	0 – 4	Iran
	Report	Jahanbakhsh 25'; Kohan 61'; Azmoun 74', 81'

Takhti Stadium, Tehran
Attendance: 100
Referee: Mohammed Hassan (United Arab Emirates)

6 November 2011
15:30

Turkmenistan	1 – 2	Uzbekistan
Myradow 40'	Report	Makhstaliev 48'; Abdumuminov 81'

Takhti Stadium, Tehran
Attendance: 20
Referee: Dmitriy Mashentsev (Kyrgyzstan)
6 November 2011
18:30

Iran	5 – 0	Pakistan
Eskandari 3'; Jahanbakhsh 14' (pen.), 59'; Barzay 19'; Zare 88'	Report

Takhti Stadium, Tehran
Attendance: 100
Referee: Ali Sabah Adday Al-Qaysi (Iraq)

8 November 2011
15:30

Pakistan	2 – 1	India
Rehman 32', 43'	Report	Singh 55'

Takhti Stadium, Tehran
Attendance: 25
Referee: Mohammad Abu Loum (Jordan)
8 November 2011
18:30

Uzbekistan	0 – 2	Iran
	Report	Abdollahzadeh 24'; Azmoun 57'

Takhti Stadium, Tehran
Attendance: 100
Referee: Ali Shaban (Kuwait)

=== Group D ===
All matches were played in Fujairah, United Arab Emirates (UTC+4).

Team	Pld	W	D	L	GF	GA	GD	Pts
Syria	4	4	0	0	10	0	+10	12
United Arab Emirates (H)	4	3	0	1	5	2	+3	9
Lebanon	4	2	0	2	3	8	−5	6
Yemen	4	1	0	3	4	7	−3	3
Palestine	4	0	0	4	1	6	−5	0

27 October 2011
15:50

Yemen	0 – 1	Syria
	Report	Kharbin 75'

Fujairah Club Stadium, Fujairah
Attendance: 700
Referee: Naser Al Ghafary (Jordan)
27 October 2011
18:30

Lebanon	1 – 0	Palestine
Saleh 34'	Report

Fujairah Club Stadium, Fujairah
Attendance: 1,000
Referee: Salah Abbas Alabbasi (Bahrain)

29 October 2011
15:50

Palestine	0 – 1	United Arab Emirates
	Report	Gharib 90+6'

Fujairah Club Stadium, Fujairah
Attendance: 2,015
Referee: Akbar Bakhshi Zadeh (Iran)
29 October 2011
18:30

Lebanon	2 – 1	Yemen
Siblini 41'; Maksoud 76'	Report	Mohammed 32'

Fujairah Club Stadium, Fujairah
Attendance: 500
Referee: Yousef Al-Marzouq (Kuwait)

31 October 2011
15:50

United Arab Emirates	1 – 0	Lebanon
Al Hammadi 29'	Report

Fujairah Club Stadium, Fujairah
Attendance: 3,451
Referee: Marai Al Awaji (Saudi Arabia)
31 October 2011
18:30

Syria	2 – 0	Palestine
Salem 18'; Mobayed 40'	Report

Fujairah Club Stadium, Fujairah
Attendance: 735
Referee: Salah Abbas Alabbasi (Bahrain)

2 November 2011
15:50

Syria	6 – 0	Lebanon
Maowas 39'; Salem 57', 59'; Mobayed 77'; Jwayed 88'; Hafean 90+3'	Report

Fujairah Club Stadium, Fujairah
Attendance: 657
Referee: Yousef Al-Marzouq (Kuwait)
2 November 2011
18:30

Yemen	1 – 3	United Arab Emirates
Al-Worafi 64' (pen.)	Report	Al Mazrouei 23'; Abdulrahman 71'; Al Khoory 82' (pen.)

Fujairah Club Stadium, Fujairah
Attendance: 3,870
Referee: Marai Al Awaji (Saudi Arabia)

4 November 2011
15:50

Palestine	1 – 2	Yemen
Maraaba 14' (pen.)	Report	Alos 68'; Al-Matari 83'

Fujairah Club Stadium, Fujairah
Attendance: 513
Referee: Naser Al Ghafary (Jordan)
4 November 2011
18:30

United Arab Emirates	0 – 1	Syria
	Report	Jwayed 65' (pen.)

Fujairah Club Stadium, Fujairah
Attendance: 5,122
Referee: Akbar Bakhshi Zadeh (Iran)

=== Group E ===
All matches were played in Bangkok, Thailand (UTC+7).

Team	Pld	W	D	L	GF	GA	GD	Pts
Thailand (H)	4	3	1	0	15	0	+15	10
South Korea	4	3	0	1	25	1	+24	9
Japan	4	2	1	1	31	1	+30	7
Chinese Taipei	4	1	0	3	11	12	−1	3
Guam	4	0	0	4	0	68	−68	0
Hong Kong (W)	0	0	0	0	0	0	0	0

(W) Withdrew
31 October 2011
18:00

Thailand	1 – 0	South Korea
Thitiphan 57'	Report

Thephasadin Stadium, Bangkok
Attendance: 2,000
Referee: Tayeb Shamsuzzaman (Bangladesh)
31 October 2011
18:00

Japan	26 – 0	Guam
Kubo 2', 11', 34', 36', 45', 62', 72', 85'; Kondo 12'; Endo 22', 25', 38'; Notsuda 28', 87', 90+2' (pen.); Harakawa 30', 40'; Kumagai 44'; R. Sugimoto 50'; Minami 53', 63', 69', 69', 71', 73', 90'	Report

Thai-Japanese Stadium, Bangkok
Attendance: 200
Referee: Banjar Al-Dosari (Qatar)

2 November 2011
15:00

South Korea	18 – 0	Guam
Kim Hyun 9', 11'; Seong Bong-Jae 16', 20', 40', 50', 70', 84'; Do Dong-Hyun 24', 37', 66'; Kang Sang-Woo 57', 59'; Kim Seung-jun 63', 83'; Choi Jeong-Yong 73', 78'; Kim Young-chan 88'	Report

Thephasadin Stadium, Bangkok
Attendance: 400
Referee: Yaqoob Abdul Baki (Oman)
2 November 2011
18:00

Thailand	1 – 0	Chinese Taipei
Pakorn 80'	Report

Thephasadin Stadium, Bangkok
Attendance: 2,000
Referee: Võ Minh Trí (Vietnam)

5 November 2011
15:00

Guam	0 – 13	Thailand
	Report	Pinyo 13'; Pakorn 15', 23', 60', 80'; Kasidech 21', 27'; Suban 45+1', 67'; Jaturong 50', 55', 74'; Chanathip 79'

Thephasadin Stadium, Bangkok
Attendance: 1,000
Referee: Mohammed Al-Rshaidat (Jordan)
5 November 2011
18:00

Chinese Taipei	0 – 5	Japan
	Report	Kubo 13' (pen.); Harakawa 23'; Sugimoto 27'; Iwanami 57'; Minami 64'

Thephasadin Stadium, Bangkok
Attendance: 600
Referee: Pratap Singh (India)

7 November 2011
15:00

Chinese Taipei	0 – 6	South Korea
	Report	Seong Bong-Jae 2', 51'; Moon Chang-Jin 5', 56'; Heo Yong-joon 50', 87'

Thephasadin Stadium, Bangkok
Attendance: 400
Referee: Tayeb Shamsuzzaman (Bangladesh)
7 November 2011
18:00

Japan	0 – 0	Thailand
	Report

Thephasadin Stadium, Bangkok
Attendance: 3,000
Referee: Banjar Al-Dosari (Qatar)

10 November 2011
15:00

Guam	0 – 11	Chinese Taipei
	Report	Wen Chih-hao 2', 15', 25', 42'; Ko Yu-Ting 23'; Lin Chien-hsun 27', 38', 49', 88'; Hsu Heng-Pin 32'; Lee Chun-Chia 80'

Thephasadin Stadium, Bangkok
Attendance: 200
Referee: Pratap Singh (India)
10 November 2011
18:00

South Korea	1 – 0	Japan
Moon Chang-Jin 80'	Report

Thephasadin Stadium, Bangkok
Attendance: 500
Referee: Võ Minh Trí (Vietnam)

=== Group F ===
All matches were played in Ho Chi Minh City, Vietnam (UTC+7).

Team	Pld	W	D	L	GF	GA	GD	Pts
North Korea	4	3	1	0	10	3	+7	10
Vietnam (H)	4	1	3	0	8	4	+4	6
Malaysia	4	1	2	1	5	5	0	5
Myanmar	4	0	3	1	4	6	−2	3
Laos	4	0	1	3	3	12	−9	1

31 October 2011
16:00

Malaysia	0 – 0	Vietnam
	Report

Thong Nhat Stadium, Ho Chi Minh City
Attendance: 400
Referee: Kim Sang-Woo (South Korea)
31 October 2011
19:00

Laos	2 – 2	Myanmar
Phoutthasay 10'; Sitthideth 52'	Report	Ye Ko Oo 78', 90+3'

Thong Nhat Stadium, Ho Chi Minh City
Attendance: 200
Referee: Ryuji Sato (Japan)

2 November 2011
16:00

Myanmar	0 – 2	North Korea
	Report	Ju Jong-Chol 57'; Ye Win Aung 77' (o.g.)

Thong Nhat Stadium, Ho Chi Minh City
Attendance: 200
Referee: Nivon Robesh Gamini (Sri Lanka)
2 November 2011
19:00

Laos	1 – 4	Malaysia
Syphasay 18'	Report	Akmal 30', 55'; Nazirul 77' (pen.); Shahrul 79' (pen.)

Thong Nhat Stadium, Ho Chi Minh City
Attendance: 200
Referee: Rustam Kholov (Tajikistan)

4 November 2011
16:00

North Korea	2 – 0	Laos
Jo Kwang 5'; Jang Ok-Chol 10'	Report

Thong Nhat Stadium, Ho Chi Minh City
Attendance: 200
Referee: Chaiya Mahapab (Thailand)
4 November 2011
19:00

Vietnam	2 – 2	Myanmar
Nguyễn Thanh Hiền 4' (pen.), 83' (pen.)	Report	Naing Lin Oo 8' (pen.), 20' (pen.)

Thong Nhat Stadium, Ho Chi Minh City
Attendance: 200
Referee: Rustam Kholov (Tajikistan)

6 November 2011
16:00

Malaysia	1 – 4	North Korea
Kamaruddin 24' (pen.)	Report	Pak Song-Il 17', 83', 88'; Kang Nam-Gwon 58'

Thong Nhat Stadium, Ho Chi Minh City
Attendance: 200
Referee: Kim Sang-Woo (South Korea)
6 November 2011
19:00

Vietnam	4 – 0	Laos
Nguyễn Thanh Hiền 38' (pen.); Nguyễn Xuân Nam 43', 90+1' (pen.); Đỗ Hùng Dũng 64'	Report

Thong Nhat Stadium, Ho Chi Minh City
Attendance: 300
Referee: Nivon Robesh Gamini (Sri Lanka)

8 November 2011
16:00

Myanmar	0 – 0	Malaysia
	Report

Thong Nhat Stadium, Ho Chi Minh City
Attendance: 200
Referee: Chaiya Mahapab (Thailand)
8 November 2011
19:00

North Korea	2 – 2	Vietnam
So Jong-Hyok 31'; Kwon Chung-Hyok 59'	Report	Hồ Sỹ Sâm 36'; Phan Đình Thắng 52'

Thong Nhat Stadium, Ho Chi Minh City
Attendance: 400
Referee: Ryuji Sato (Japan)

=== Group G ===
All matches were held in Petaling Jaya (Selangor), Malaysia (UTC+8).

Team	Pld	W	D	L	GF	GA	GD	Pts
Australia	4	4	0	0	20	1	+19	12
China	4	2	1	1	16	3	+13	7
Indonesia	4	2	1	1	7	4	+3	7
Singapore	4	0	1	3	0	15	−15	1
Macau	4	0	1	3	0	20	−20	1

31 October 2011
16:00

Indonesia	0 – 0	China
	Report

MBPJ Stadium, Petaling Jaya
Attendance: 25
Referee: Mohd bin Wahab (Malaysia)
31 October 2011
19:30

Macau	0 – 0	Singapore
	Report

MBPJ Stadium, Petaling Jaya
Attendance: 40
Referee: Timur Faizullin (Kyrgyzstan)

2 November 2011
11:00

Singapore	0 – 1	Australia
	Report	Caira 51'

MBPJ Stadium, Petaling Jaya
Attendance: 60
Referee: Apisit Aonrak (Thailand)
2 November 2011
14:00

Macau	0 – 3	Indonesia
	Report	Setiawan 47'; Lestaluhu 63', 78'

MBPJ Stadium, Petaling Jaya
Attendance: 20
Referee: Jin Ko-Hyung (South Korea)

4 November 2011
11:00

Australia	12 – 0	Macau
Donachie 5'; Proia 9' (pen.), 31', 53', 69'; Makarounas 14' (pen.), 36'; Retre 34'; Brown 45+1'; Taggart 60', 90'; Geria 66'	Report

MBPJ Stadium, Petaling Jaya
Attendance: 25
Referee: Yu Ming-hsun (Chinese Taipei)
4 November 2011
14:00

China	11 – 0	Singapore
Wang Shangyuan 8', 75'; Wu Xinghan 23', 33', 45+1' (pen.), 49'; Chen Zhongliu 39'; Liu Binbin 50'; Chen Hao 57'; Qi Tianyu 65' (pen.); Zhuang Jiajie 71'	Report

MBPJ Stadium, Petaling Jaya
Attendance: 30
Referee: Mohd bin Wahab (Malaysia)

6 November 2011
11:00

China	5 – 0	Macau
Wang Shangyuan 8', 31' (pen.); Chen Zhongliu 11'; Lin Chuangyi 60'; Jin Bo 70'	Report

MBPJ Stadium, Petaling Jaya
Attendance: 30
Referee: Apisit Aonrak (Thailand)
6 November 2011
14:00

Indonesia	1 – 4	Australia
Lastaluhu 76' (pen.)	Report	Maclaren 4', 9' (pen.), 65'; Antonis 40'

MBPJ Stadium, Petaling Jaya
Attendance: 40
Referee: Timur Faizullin (Kyrgyzstan)

8 November 2011
11:00

Singapore	0 – 3	Indonesia
	Report	Setiawan 10'; Nugroho 41'; Lestaluhu 51'

MBPJ Stadium, Petaling Jaya
Attendance: 20
Referee: Yu Ming-hsun (Chinese Taipei)
8 November 2011
14:00

Australia	3 – 0	China
Maclaren 39'; Taggart 50'; Wooding 63'	Report

MBPJ Stadium, Petaling Jaya
Attendance: 20
Referee: Jin Ko-Hyung (South Korea)

== Third-placed qualifiers ==
At the end of the first stage, a comparison will be made between the third placed teams of each group. The one best third-placed teams from the West Zone (Group A to D) and one best third-placed team from the East (Group E to G) would also advanced to the AFC U-19 Championship 2012.

=== West Zone ===
Because three groups has one team fewer than the others, following the withdrawal of Afghanistan and Nepal, matches against the sixth-placed team in each group are not included in this ranking. As a result, four matches played by each team will count for the purposes of the third-placed table.

Grp	Team	Pld	W	D	L	GF	GA	GD	Pts
B	Jordan	4	2	1	1	7	2	+5	7
A	Oman	4	2	0	2	6	8	−2	6
D	Lebanon	4	2	0	2	3	8	−5	6
C	India	4	1	0	3	5	8	−3	3

=== East Zone ===
Grp	Team	Pld	W	D	L	GF	GA	GD	Pts
E	Japan	4	2	1	1	31	1	+30	7
G	Indonesia	4	2	1	1	7	4	+3	7
F	Malaysia	4	1	2	1	5	5	0	5

== Qualifiers ==
- Australia
- China
- Iran
- Iraq
- Japan
- Jordan
- Kuwait
- North Korea
- Qatar
- Saudi Arabia
- South Korea
- Syria
- Thailand
- United Arab Emirates
- Uzbekistan
- Vietnam

== See also ==
- 2012 AFC U-16 Championship qualification
