= Table tennis at the 2026 Asian Games – Men's team =

Men's team at the 2026 Asian Games
- Venue: Sky Hall Toyota
- Date: 20–24 September 2026
- Competitors: 97 from 23 nations

Medalists
gold medal	Japan; Tomokazu Harimoto, Sora Matsushima, Shunsuke Togami, Hiroto Shinozuka, Yukiya Uda
silver medal	China; Wang Chuqin, Lin Shidong, Wen Ruibo, Xiang Peng, Huang Youzheng
bronze medal	South Korea; Jang Woo-jin, An Jae-hyun, Oh Jun-sung, Lim Jong-hoon, Park Gyu-hyeon
bronze medal	Chinese Taipei; Lin Yun-ju, Kuo Guan-hong, Feng Yi-hsin, Hung Jing-kai, Hsu Hsien-cha

The men's team table tennis event at the 2026 Asian Games took place from 20 to 24 September 2026 at the Sky Hall Toyota. Japan won the gold medal, defeating China in the final to win the event for the first time since 1966 and end China's streak of eight consecutive Asian Games titles.

== Schedule ==
All times are Japan Standard Time (UTC+09:00)

Date	Day	Time	Event
20 September	Sunday	12:30	Preliminary 1
20 September	Sunday	18:30	Preliminary 2
21 September	Monday	12:30	Preliminary 3
22 September	Tuesday	12:30	Round of 16
22 September	Tuesday	19:20	Quarterfinals
23 September	Wednesday	17:00	Semifinals
24 September	Thursday	17:00	Final

== Results ==
=== Preliminary ===
==== Group A ====
Pos	Team	Pld	W	L	MF	MA	Pts	Qualification
1	China	2	2	0	6	0	4	Quarterfinals
2	Qatar	2	1	1	3	5	3	Round of 16
3	Macau	2	0	2	2	6	2	

Source: Official website

20 September	China	3–0	Macau

Lin Shidong	3–0	Chan Chi In	11–4, 11–7, 11–8
Wen Ruibo	3–0	Mak Tin Ian	11–6, 11–3, 11–6
Huang Youzheng	3–0	Zheng Hong Wai	11–9, 11–8, 11–3
Lin Shidong		Mak Tin Ian	not played
Wen Ruibo		Chan Chi In	not played

20 September	China	3–0	Qatar

Wang Chuqin	3–0	Abdullah Abdulhussein	11–5, 11–6, 11–4
Lin Shidong	3–0	Mohammed Ahussein	11–1, 11–2, 11–1
Xiang Peng	3–0	Sultan Al-Kuwari	11–6, 11–2, 11–5
Wang Chuqin		Mohammed Ahussein	not played
Lin Shidong		Abdullah AbdulHussein	not played

21 September	Macau	2–3	Qatar

Mak Tin Ian	3–0	Abdullah Abdulhussein	11–4, 11–8, 11–8
Chan Chi In	1–3	Mohammed Ahussein	7–11, 9–11, 12–10, 10–12
Zheng Hong Wai	1–3	Ahmed Korani	11–7, 7–11, 12–14, 8–11
Mak Tin Ian	3–0	Mohammed Ahussein	11–9, 12–10, 11–6
Chan Chi In	1–3	Mohammed Ahussein	12–10, 9–11, 9–11, 11–13

==== Group B ====
Pos	Team	Pld	W	L	MF	MA	Pts	Qualification
1	Japan	2	2	0	6	0	4	Quarterfinals
2	Uzbekistan	2	1	1	3	3	3	Round of 16
3	Maldives	2	0	2	0	6	2	

Source: Official website

20 September	Japan	3–0	Maldives

Sora Matsushima	3–0	Mohamed Ismail	11–6, 11–9, 11–6
Shunsuke Togami	3–0	Moosa Ahmed	11–5, 11–3, 11–4
Hiroto Shinozuka	3–0	Mohamed Rafiu	11–3, 11–3, 11–8
Sora Matsushima		Moosa Ahmed	not played
Shunsuke Togami		Mohamed Ismail	not played

20 September	Japan	3–0	Uzbekistan

Tomokazu Harimoto	3–0	Khurshid Akhmedov	11–3, 11–4, 11–7
Shunsuke Togami	3–1	Shokhrukh Iskandarov	11–3, 9–11, 13–11, 11–6
Hiroto Shinozuka	3–0	Diyorbek Dilshodov	11–2, 14–12, 11–2
Tomokazu Harimoto		Shokhrukh Iskandarov	not played
Shunsuke Togami		Khurshid Akhmedov	not played

21 September	Uzbekistan	3–0	Maldives

Shokhrukh Iskandarov	3–0	Akhyar Khalid	11–7, 11–7, 11–3
Diyorbek Dilshodov	3–0	Mohamed Ismail	11–9, 11–3, 11–7
Khurshid Akhmedov	3–1	Moosa Ahmed	12–10, 11–6, 11–13, 11–6
Shokhrukh Iskandarov		Mohamed Ismail	not played
Diyorbek Dilshodov		Akhyar Khalid	not played

==== Group C ====
Pos	Team	Pld	W	L	MF	MA	Pts	Qualification
1	Chinese Taipei	2	2	0	6	0	4	Round of 16
2	Bahrain	2	1	1	3	3	3	Round of 16
3	Nepal	2	0	2	0	6	2	

Source: Official website

20 September	Chinese Taipei	3–0	Nepal

Lin Yun-ju	3–0	Rubin Maharjan	11–5, 11–1, 11–7
Hung Jing-kai	3–0	Sanyog Kapali	11–5, 11–5, 11–4
Feng Yi-hsin	3–0	Gananjaya Dahal	11–3, 11–2, 11–0
Lin Yun-ju		Sanyog Kapali	not played
Hung Jing-kai		Rubin Maharjan	not played

20 September	Bahrain	0–3	Chinese Taipei

Rashed Rashed	0–3	Hsu Hsien-chia	6–11, 9–11, 4–11
Mohammed Alaali	0–3	Lin Yun-ju	3–11, 4–11, 1–11
Sayed Mahfoodh	0–3	Kuo Guan-hong	5–11, 7–11, 6–11
Rashed Rashed		Lin Yun-ju	not played
Mohammed Alaali		Hsu Hsien-chia	not played

21 September	Bahrain	3–0	Nepal

Rashed Rashed	3–0	Sanyog Kapali	11–6, 11–5, 11–4
Mohamed Saleh	3–1	Rubin Maharjan	11–3, 11–8, 9–11, 11–9
Mohammed Alaali	3–0	Gananjaya Dahal	13–11, 11–2, 11–9
Rashed Rashed		Rubin Maharjan	not played
Mohamed Saleh		Sanyog Kapali	not played

==== Group D ====
Pos	Team	Pld	W	L	MF	MA	Pts	Qualification
1	South Korea	2	2	0	6	0	4	Round of 16
2	Mongolia	2	1	1	3	4	3	Round of 16
3	Yemen	2	0	2	1	6	2	

Source: Official website

20 September	South Korea	3–0	Yemen

Jang Woo-jin	3–0	Magd Aldhubhani	11–4, 11–1, 11–2
Lim Jong-hoon	3–0	Ebrahim Gubran	11–5, 11–5, 11–8
Oh Jun-sung	3–0	Abdulrahman Alyafaee	11–5, 11–5, 11–6
Jang Woo-jin		Ebrahim Gubran	not played
Lim Jong-hoon		Magd Aldhubhani	not played

20 September	South Korea	3–0	Mongolia

An Jae-hyun	3–0	Bilguun Ankhbayar	11–2, 11–5, 11–5
Oh Jun-sung	3–0	Temuulen Myandal	11–3, 11–9, 11–2
Park Gyu-hyeon	3–0	Enkhtuguldurbayasgalan Bodisuren	11–3, 11–1, 11–1
An Jae-hyun		Temuulen Myandal	not played
Oh Jun-sung		Bilguun Ankhbayar	not played

21 September	Mongolia	3–1	Yemen

Temuulen Myandal	1–3	Ebrahim Gubran	11–9, 8–11, 6–11, 9–11
Bilguun Ankhbayar	3–1	Magd Aldhubhani	11–8, 11–8, 8–11, 11–3
Enkhtamirbayasgalan Bodisuren	3–1	Abdulrahman Alyafaee	11–5, 9–11, 11–4, 13–11
Temuulen Myandal	3–1	Magd Aldhubhani	11–9, 11–6, 8–11, 11–9
Bilguun Ankhbayar		Ebrahim Gubran	not played

==== Group E ====
Pos	Team	Pld	W	L	MF	MA	Pts	Qualification
1	Hong Kong	2	2	0	6	1	4	Round of 16
2	Thailand	2	1	1	4	3	3	Round of 16
3	Kyrgyzstan	2	0	2	0	6	2	

Source: Official website

20 September	Kyrgyzstan	0–3	Hong Kong

Atai Kasymov	0–3	Wong Chun Ting	1–11, 2–11, 2–11
Nuradil Tologonov	0–3	Chan Baldwin	4–11, 1–11, 4–11
Abai Kasymov	0–3	Yiu Kwan To	1–11, 1–11, 1–11
Atai Kasymov		Chan Baldwin	not played
Nuradil Tologonov		Wong Chun Ting	not played

20 September	Hong Kong	3–1	Thailand

Wong Chun Ting	3–1	Thitaphat Preechayan	13–11, 7–11, 11–2, 11–3
Chan Baldwin	2–3	Phakpoom Sanguansin	3–11, 11–8, 11–6, 8–11, 7–11
Lam Siu Hang	3–2	Sarayut Tancharoen	4–11, 11–9, 11–6, 9–11, 11–5
Wong Chun Ting	3–1	Phakpoom Sanguansin	8–11, 11–5, 11–1, 11–8
Chan Baldwin		Thitaphat Preechayan	not played

20 September	Thailand	3–0	Kyrgyzstan

Thitaphat Preechayan	3–0	Abai Kasymov	11–4, 11–4, 11–5
Sarayut Tancharoen	3–1	Nuradil Tologonov	9–11, 11–6, 11–5, 11–3
Phakpoom Sanguansin	3–0	Atai Kasymov	11–5, 11–5, 11–8
Thitaphat Preechayan		Nuradil Tologonov	not played
Sarayut Tancharoen		Abai Kasymov	not played

==== Group F ====
Pos	Team	Pld	W	L	MF	MA	Pts	Qualification
1	Iran	3	3	0	9	1	6	Round of 16
2	India	3	2	1	6	3	5	Round of 16
3	Indonesia	3	1	2	4	6	4	
4	Pakistan	3	0	3	0	9	3	

Source: Official website and Olympics news

20 September	Pakistan	0–3	Iran

Taha Bilal	0–3	Benyamin Faraji	5–11, 3–11, 2–11
Muhammad Khan	0–3	Nima Alamian	5–11, 8–11, 3–11
Abbas Khan	0–3	Noshad Alamiyan	6–11, 5–11, 2–11
Taha Bilal		Nima Alamian	not played
Muhammad Khan		Benyamin Faraji	not played

20 September	Indonesia	0–3	India

Muhammad Negara	0–3	Sathiyan Gnanasekaran	8–11, 7–11, 9–11
Muhammad Junindra	2–3	Manav Thakkar	7–11, 11–8, 6–11, 11–6, 9–11
Affan Pratama	0–3	Manush Shah	9–11, 9–11, 10–12
Muhammad Negara		Manav Thakkar	not played
Muhammad Junindra		Sathiyan Gnanasekaran	not played

20 September	Iran	3–0	India

Noshad Alamiyan	3–0	Manush Shah	11–3, 11–8, 12–10
Benyamin Faraji	3–0	Manav Thakkar	11–2, 11–6, 11–6
Nima Alamian	3–2	Harmeet Desai	12–10, 13–15, 11–3, 10–12, 11–2
Noshad Alamiyan		Manav Thakkar	not played
Benyamin Faraji		Manush Shah	not played

20 September	Indonesia	3–0	Pakistan

Muhammad Negara	3–1	Muhammad Khan	11–7, 9–11, 11–5, 11–7
Muhammad Junindra	3–0	Taha Bilal	11–7, 11–5,11–9
Affan Pratama	3–0	Abdal Khan	11–5, 11–5, 11–9
Muhammad Negara		Taha Bilal	not played
Muhammad Junindra		Muhammad Khan	not played

21 September	Iran	3–1	Indonesia

Noshad Alamiyan	3–2	Muhammad Negara	9–11, 11–3, 11–8, 7–11, 11–5
Nima Alamian	3–1	Muhammad Junindra	11–7, 11–7, 10–12, 12–10
Aryan Ghaffari	1–3	Affan Pratama	11–13, 9–11, 11–9, 2–11
Nima Alamian	3–0	Muhammad Negara	11–5, 11–6, 11–5
Noshad Alamiyan		Muhammad Junindra	not played

21 September	India	3–0	Pakistan

Harmeet Desai	3–0	Muhammad Khan	11–4, 11–3, 11–5
Sathiyan Gnanasekaran	3–0	Abbas Khan	11–1, 11–8, 11–9
Payas Jain	3–0	Taimur Khan	11–2, 11–5, 11–7
Sathiyan Gnanasekaran		Muhammad Khan	not played
Harmeet Desai		Abbas Khan	not played

==== Group G ====
Pos	Team	Pld	W	L	MF	MA	Pts	Qualification
1	Kazakhstan	3	3	0	9	2	6	Round of 16
2	Singapore	3	2	1	7	4	5	Round of 16
3	Laos	3	1	2	5	7	4	
4	Bangladesh	3	0	3	1	9	3	

Source: Official website

20 September	Kazakhstan	3–0	Bangladesh

Kirill Gerassimenko	3–0	Mohutasin Ridoy	11–5, 11–4, 11–4
Alan Kurmangaliyev	3–0	Imrul Imon	11–4, 11–7, 11–9
Sanzhar Zhubanov	3–0	Ramhimlian Bawm	11–8, 11–5, 13–11
Kirill Gerassimenko		Imrul Imon	not played
Alan Kurmangaliyev		Mohutasin Ridoy	not played

20 September	Singapore	3–1	Laos

Quek Yong	3–0	Anane Vongsa	11–3, 11–2, 11–4
Pang Yew	2–3	Johan Hagberg	11–8, 5–11, 8–11, 12–10, 9–11
Chua Josh	3–0	Phongsavanh Sengmany	11–8, 13–11, 11–1
Quek Yong	3–1	Johan Hagberg	4–11, 11–6, 11–6, 11–5
Pang Yew		Anane Vongsa	not played

20 September	Singapore	1–3	Kazakhstan

Quek Yong	1–3	Alan Kurmangaliyev	8–11, 8–11, 11–7, 9–11
Pang Yew	1–3	Kirill Gerassimenko	4–11, 12–10, 6–11, 3–11
Chua Josh	3–1	Sanzhar Zhubanov	9–11, 11–6, 11–6, 12–10
Quek Yong	0–3	Kirill Gerassimenko	5–11, 8–11, 6–11
Pang Yew		Alan Kurmangaliyev	not played

20 September	Laos	3–1	Bangladesh

Johan Hagberg	3–0	Ramhimlian Bawm	11–7, 11–7, 11–3
Anane Vongsa	0–3	Mohutasin Ridoy	9–11, 10–12, 9–11
Phongsavanh Sengmany	3–0	Imrul Imon	13–11, 12–10, 11–8
Johan Hagberg	3–0	Mohutasin Ridoy	11–5, 11–6, 11–8
Anane Vongsa		Ramhimlian Bawm	not played

21 September	Singapore	3–0	Bangladesh

Pang Yew	3–1	Ramhimlian Bawm	11–3, 11–6, 10–12, 11–9
Le Ellsworth	3–0	Imrul Imon	11–8, 11–6, 12–10
Chew Zhe Yu	3–0	Mohutasin Ridoy	12–10, 11–2, 11–6
Pang Yew		Imrul Imon	not played
Le Ellsworth		Ramhimlian Bawm	not played

21 September	Kazakhstan	3–1	Laos

Kirill Gerassimenko	3–0	Anane Vongsa	11–8, 11–4, 11–2
Alan Kurmangaliyev	2–3	Johan Hagberg	9–11, 11–8, 11–7, 9–11, 8–11
Sanzhar Zhubanov	3–0	Phongsavanh Sengmany	11–4, 11–2, 11–6
Kirill Gerassimenko	3–2	Johan Hagberg	11–9, 9–11, 11–6, 11–13, 11–5
Alan Kurmangaliyev		Anane Vongsa	not played

=== Knockout round ===
Round of 16
14	Uzbekistan	0
10	Thailand	3
9	Iran	3
8	Singapore	0
13	Mongolia	0
3	Chinese Taipei	3
4	South Korea	3
6	India	0
11	Qatar	0
5	Hong Kong	3
7	Kazakhstan	3
12	Bahrain	0

Quarterfinals
1	China	3
10	Thailand	1
9	Iran	0
3	Chinese Taipei	3
4	South Korea	3
5	Hong Kong	0
7	Kazakhstan	0
2	Japan	3

Semifinals
1	China	3
3	Chinese Taipei	0
4	South Korea	0
2	Japan	3

Final
1	China	2
2	Japan	3

==== Round of 16 ====
22 September	Uzbekistan	0–3	Thailand

Shokhrukh Iskandarov	0–3	Thitaphat Preechayan	8–11, 2–11, 5–11
Khurshid Akhmedov	0–3	Phakpoom Sanguansin	8–11, 10–12, 5–11
Diyorbek Dilshodov	0–3	Sarayut Tancharoen	14–16, 9–11, 7–11
Shokhrukh Iskandarov		Phakpoom Sanguansin	not played
Khurshid Akhmedov		Thitaphat Preechayan	not played

22 September	Iran	3–0	Singapore

Noshad Alamiyan	3–1	Chua Josh	10–12, 11–7, 11–8, 11–7
Benyamin Faraji	3–1	Quek Yong	6–11, 11–7, 11–2, 11–7
Nima Alamian	3–2	Pang Yew En	11–5, 11–5, 9–11, 15–17, 11–4
Noshad Alamiyan		Quek Yong	not played
Benyamin Faraji		Chua Josh	not played

22 September	Mongolia	0–3	Chinese Taipei

Bilguun Ankhbayar	0–3	Feng Yi-hsin	2–11, 6–11, 3–11
Temuulen Myandal	0–3	Kuo Guan-hong	3–11, 3–11, 6–11
Enkhtamirbayasgalan Bodisuren	0–3	Hung Jing-kai	8–11, 6–11, 4–11
Bilguun Ankhbayar		Kuo Guan-hong	not played
Temuulen Myandal		Feng Yi-hsin	not played

22 September	South Korea	3–0	India

Jang Woo-jin	3–1	Harmeet Desai	8–11, 11–7, 11–8, 11–9
Oh Jun-sung	3–2	Manush Shah	11–4, 8–11, 11–13, 13–11, 11–6
An Jae-hyun	3–1	Manav Thakkar	12–10, 11–6, 7–11, 12–10
Jang Woo-jin		Manush Shah	not played
Oh Jun-sung		Harmeet Desai	not played

22 September	Qatar	0–3	Hong Kong

Abdullah Abdulhussein	0–3	Wong Chun Ting	4–11, 5–11, 9–11
Mohammed Ahussein	1–3	Chan Baldwin	2–11, 11–9, 7–11, 1–11
Sultan Al-Kuwari	0–3	Lam Siu Hang	10–12, 8–11, 9–11
Abdullah Abdulhussein		Chan Baldwin	not played
Mohammed Ahussein		Wong Chun Ting	not played

22 September	Kazakhstan	3–0	Bahrain

Alan Kurmangaliyev	3–0	Rashed Rashed	11–3, 11–3, 11–6
Kirill Gerassimenko	3–0	Mohammed Alaali	11–4, 11–9, 11–9
Sanzhar Zhubanov	3–2	Mohamed Saleh	11–2, 12–10, 8–11, 4–11, 18–16
Alan Kurmangaliyev		Mohammed Alaali	not played
Kirill Gerassimenko		Rashed Rashed	not played

==== Quarterfinals ====
22 September	China	3–1	Thailand

Wang Chuqin	3–0	Phakpoom Sanguansin	11–6, 11–8, 11–5
Lin Shidong	2–3	Thitaphat Preechayan	11–4, 8–11, 11–6, 7–11, 7–11
Xiang Peng	3–1	Sarayut Tancharoen	11–6, 7–11, 11–9, 11–7
Wang Chuqin	3–0	Thitaphat Preechayan	11–3, 11–3, 11–8
Lin Shidong		Phakpoom Sanguansin	not played

22 September	Iran	0–3	Chinese Taipei

Noshad Alamiyan	1–3	Lin Yun-ju	5–11, 11–7, 9–11, 5–11
Benyamin Faraji	0–3	Kuo Guan-hong	6–11, 4–11, 9–11
Nima Alamian	0–3	Feng Yi-hsin	6–11, 8–11, 2–11
Noshad Alamiyan		Kuo Guan-hong	not played
Benyamin Faraji		Lin Yun-ju	not played

22 September	South Korea	3–0	Hong Kong

Jang Woo-jin	3–0	Chan Baldwin	11–7, 11–4, 11–8
Oh Jun-sung	3–0	Wong Chun Ting	11–8, 11–7, 12–10
An Jae-hyun	3–1	Lam Siu Hang	13–11, 4–11, 13–11, 12–10
Jang Woo-jin		Wong Chun Ting	not played
Oh Jun-sung		Chan Baldwin	not played

22 September	Japan	3–0	Kazakhstan

Tomokazu Harimoto	3–0	Alan Kurmangaliyev	11–5, 11–5, 11–5
Sora Matsushima	3–2	Kirill Gerassimenko	7–11, 11–6, 8–11, 11–7, 12–10
Shunsuke Togami	3–0	Sanzhar Zhubanov	11–8, 11–5, 11–8
Tomokazu Harimoto		Kirill Gerassimenko	not played
Sora Matsushima		Alan Kurmangaliyev	not played

==== Semifinals ====
23 September	China	3–0	Chinese Taipei

Wang Chuqin	3–2	Lin Yun-ju	11–8, 11–9, 9–11, 8–11, 15–13
Lin Shidong	3–0	Feng Yi-hsin	11–8, 11–6, 11–1
Wen Ruibo	3–1	Kuo Guan-hong	12–14, 11–7, 11–8, 11–6
Wang Chuqin		Feng Yi-hsin	not played
Lin Shidong		Lin Yun-ju	not played

23 September	South Korea	0–3	Japan

Jang Woo-jin	1–3	Sora Matsushima	9–11, 7–11, 11–6, 8–11
An Jae-hyun	0–3	Tomokazu Harimoto	10–12, 5–11, 9–11
Oh Jun-sung	2–3	Shunsuke Togami	11–7, 6–11, 7–11, 12–10, 9–11
Jang Woo-jin		Tomokazu Harimoto	not played
An Jae-hyun		Sora Matsushima	not played

==== Final ====
24 September	China	2–3	Japan

Wang Chuqin	3–2	Sora Matsushima	5–11, 8–11, 11–9, 11–9, 11–9
Wen Ruibo	1–3	Tomokazu Harimoto	7–11, 11–8, 4–11, 9–11
Lin Shidong	3–1	Shunsuke Togami	11–9, 4–11, 11–7, 11–6
Wang Chuqin	0–3	Tomokazu Harimoto	7–11, 4–11, 9–11
Wen Ruibo	1–3	Sora Matsushima	7–11, 11–8, 6–11, 8–11
