= 2011 AFF U-19 Youth Championship =

၂၀၁၁ အာဆီယံ ယူ-၁၉ ချန်ပီယံရှစ်ပြိုင်ပွဲ

Tournament details
- Host country: Myanmar
- City: Yangon
- Dates: 8–21 September
- Teams: 10 (from 1 confederation)
- Venue: 2 (in 1 host city)

Final positions
- Champions: Thailand (3rd title)
- Runners-up: Vietnam
- Third place: Malaysia
- Fourth place: Myanmar

Tournament statistics
- Matches played: 24
- Goals scored: 97 (4.04 per match)
- Top scorer(s): (Vietnam) Nguyễn Xuân Nam (8 goals)

The 2011 AFF U-19 Youth Championship was held from 8 to 21 September 2011, hosted by Myanmar. All games were initially set to be played at the Thuwunna Stadium but the Aung San Stadium was also added to the match schedule due to unfavorable weather conditions that were forecast to persist for the opening stages which would be detrimental to the Thuwunna Stadium pitch.

== Tournament ==
- All times are Myanmar Standard Time (MST) - UTC+6:30.

=== Group stage ===
==== Group A ====
Pos	Team	Pld	W	D	L	GF	GA	GD	Pts	Qualification
1	Thailand	4	4	0	0	14	0	+14	12	Advance to knockout stage
2	Malaysia	4	2	1	1	12	1	+11	7	Advance to knockout stage
3	Cambodia	4	1	2	1	6	9	−3	5	
4	Singapore	4	0	2	2	2	11	−9	2	
5	Philippines	4	0	1	3	4	17	−13	1	

9 September 2011
15:30

Philippines	1 – 1	Singapore
Liay 38'	Report	Stephen 84'

Thuwunna Stadium, Yangon
Referee: Oki Dwi Putra (Indonesia)
9 September 2011
18:10

Cambodia	0 – 0	Malaysia
	Report

Thuwunna Stadium, Yangon

11 September 2011
15:30

Malaysia	0 – 1	Thailand
	Report	Pakorn 37'

Thuwunna Stadium, Yangon
11 September 2011
15:30

Cambodia	5 – 3	Philippines
Rathas 44', 56', 75'; Mony Udom 45'; Samouen 52'	Report	Arboleda 63', 89', 90'

Aung San Stadium, Yangon

13 September 2011
15:30

Thailand	5 – 0	Cambodia
Jaturong 3'; Itthipol 39'; Narubadin 48'; Nitipong 84'; Chalongchai 90'	Report

Thuwunna Stadium, Yangon
13 September 2011
15:30

Singapore	0 – 6	Malaysia
	Report	Ishak 9'; Akram 21', 36'; Thinesh.C 47'; Bahari 89', 90'

Aung San Stadium, Yangon

15 September 2011
15:30

Cambodia	1 – 1	Singapore
Mony Udom 60'	Report	Nur Naiim 79'

Thuwunna Stadium, Yangon
15 September 2011
15:30

Philippines	0 – 5	Thailand
	Report	Chalongchai 25', 44'; Jaturong 47'; Narubadin 79'; Adisorn 81'

Aung San Stadium, Yangon

17 September 2011
15:30

Malaysia	6 – 0	Philippines
Ishak 2', 8'; Bellezon 18' (o.g.); Thinesh.C 38'; Ridzuan 51'; Akram 60'	Report

Thuwunna Stadium, Yangon
17 September 2011
15:30

Singapore	0 – 3	Thailand
	Report	Vittaya 19'; Athit 43', 64'

Aung San Stadium, Yangon

==== Group B ====
Team	Pld	W	D	L	GF	GA	GD	Pts
Vietnam	4	3	1	0	18	2	+16	10
Myanmar	4	3	1	0	9	1	+8	10
Indonesia	4	1	1	2	14	10	+4	4
Laos	4	1	1	2	10	8	+2	4
Brunei	4	0	0	4	0	30	−30	0

8 September 2011
15:30

Laos	3 – 3	Indonesia
Sengdao 28'; Xaisongkham 39'; Souliya 65'	Report	Syahru 15', 82'; Rahmat 90+4'

Thuwunna Stadium, Yangon
8 September 2011
18:10

Brunei	0 – 7	Vietnam
	Report	Nguyễn Thanh Hiển 15', 25', 71'; Nguyễn Xuân Nam 17', 23'; Phan Đình Thắng 71'; Nguyễn Tuân Vũ 83'

Thuwunna Stadium, Yangon

10 September 2011
15:30

Vietnam	1 – 1	Myanmar
Naing Ko Lin 45+' (o.g.)	Report	Yan Naing Htwe 88'

Thuwunna Stadium, Yangon
10 September 2011
18:10

Brunei	0 – 7	Laos
	Report	Sitthideth 40'; Lembo 44', 45', 75'; Souliya 58'; Souksadakone 60'; Phouthasin 74'

Aung San Stadium, Yangon

12 September 2011
15:30

Myanmar	6 – 0	Brunei
Yan Naing Htwe 9', 35'; Soe Paing Thway 41'; Thiha Zaw 83', 87'; Ye Ko Ko 90'	Report

Thuwunna Stadium, Yangon
12 September 2011
15:30

Indonesia	1 – 6	Vietnam
Zoel 13'	Report	Nguyễn Thanh Hiển 3'; Nguyễn Xuân Nam 5'; Que Ngoc Hai 36'; Ho Sy Sam 47', 57'; Phan Đình Thắng 59'

Aung San Stadium, Yangon

14 September 2011
15:30

Brunei	0 – 10	Indonesia
	Report	Syahru 10'; Rahmat 27', 28', 57'; Zoel 29', 44', 54'; Rahmadana 36'; Dian 60', 73'

Aung San Stadium, Yangon
14 September 2011
15:30

Laos	0 – 1	Myanmar
	Report	Thiha Zaw 24'

Thuwunna Stadium, Yangon

16 September 2011
15:30

Vietnam	4 – 0	Laos
Que Ngoc Hai 34' (pen.); Nguyễn Xuân Nam 39', 47'; Nguyen Viet Phong 48'	Report

Aung San Stadium, Yangon
Referee: Nagor Amir Mohamed (Malaysia)
16 September 2011
15:30

Indonesia	0 – 1	Myanmar
	Report	Yan Naing Htwe 87'

Thuwunna Stadium, Yangon
Referee: Jovanie Villagracia (Philippines)

=== Knockout stage ===
Semi-finals
19 September
Thailand	2
Myanmar	1
19 September
Vietnam	2
Malaysia	1

Final
21 September
Thailand	1 (5)
Vietnam	1 (4)
Third place
21 September
Myanmar	0 (2)
Malaysia	0 (4)

==== Semi-finals ====
19 September 2011
15:30

Thailand	2 – 1	Myanmar
Puangchan 10'; Pakorn 74' (pen.)	Report	thiha zaw 41'

Thuwunna Stadium, Yangon
Referee: Jovanie Villagracia (Philippines)

19 September 2011
18:10

Vietnam	2 – 1	Malaysia
Nguyễn Xuân Nam 34', 79'	Report	Areff 41'

Thuwunna Stadium, Yangon
Referee: Tuy Vichhika (Cambodia)

==== Third place play-off ====
21 September 2011
15:30

Myanmar	0 – 0 (a.e.t.)	Malaysia
	Report
Penalties
Naing Lin Oo (penalty scored); Thiha Zaw (penalty scored)	2 – 4	(penalty scored) Shahrul; (penalty scored) Akhri; (penalty scored) Areff; (penalty scored) Akram

Thuwunna Stadium, Yangon
Referee: Oki Dwi Putra (Indonesia)

==== Final ====
21 September 2011
18:10

Thailand	1 – 1 (a.e.t.)	Vietnam
Athit 35' (pen.)	Report	Nguyễn Xuân Nam 36'
Penalties
	5 – 4

Thuwunna Stadium, Yangon
Referee: Nagor Amir Mohamed (Malaysia)

== Winner ==
2011 AFF U-19 Youth Championship winners

Thailand
Third title

== Goalscorers ==
8 goals

- (Vietnam) Nguyễn Xuân Nam

4 goals

- (Indonesia) Rahmat Saputro
- (Indonesia) Zoel Fhadli
- (Myanmar) Yan Naing Htwe
- (Vietnam) Nguyễn Thanh Hiển

3 goals

- (Cambodia) Phanny Rathas
- (Indonesia) Syahru Ramadhan
- (Laos) Lembo Saysana
- (Myanmar) Thiha Zaw
- (Philippines) Fitch Arboleda
- (Malaysia) Muhammad Akmal Ishak
- (Malaysia) Muhammad Akram Mahinan
- (Thailand) Athit Wisetsilp
- (Thailand) Chalongchai Pothong

2 goals

- (Cambodia) Prak Mony Udom
- (Indonesia) Dian Ardiansyah
- (Laos) Souliya Syphasay
- (Malaysia) Muhammad Akhir Bahari
- (Malaysia) Mohamad Ridzuan Abdunloh Pula
- (Malaysia) Thinesh.C
- (Thailand) Jaturong Pimkoon
- (Thailand) Narubadin Weerawatnodom
- (Thailand) Pakorn Prempak
- (Vietnam) Ho Sy Sam
- (Vietnam) Que Ngoc Hai
- (Vietnam) Phan Đình Thắng

1 goal

- (Cambodia) Rous Samouen
- (Indonesia) Rahmadana
- (Laos) Phouthasin Luang Amath
- (Laos) Sengdao Inthilath
- (Laos) Sitthideth Khanthavong
- (Laos) Souksadakone Liepvisay
- (Laos) Xaisongkham Champathong
- (Malaysia) Mohamad Syafiq
- (Malaysia) Nur Areff Kamaruddin
- (Myanmar) Soe Paing Thway
- (Myanmar) Zayar Phyo Kyaw
- (Myanmar) Ye Ko Ko
- (Philippines) Leo Liay
- (Singapore) Muhammad Nur Naiim Ishak
- (Singapore) Shannon Stephen
- (Thailand) Adisorn Promrak
- (Thailand) Itthipol Yodprom
- (Thailand) Nitipong Selanon
- (Thailand) Thitipan Puangchan
- (Thailand) Vittaya Niamhom
- (Vietnam) Đỗ Hùng Dũng
- (Vietnam) Nguyễn Tuân Vũ
- (Vietnam) Nguyen Viet Phong

Own goal

- (Myanmar) Naing Ko Lin (For Vietnam)
- (Philippines) Joseph Bellezon (For Malaysia)
