= 2026 Asian Table Tennis Championships – Men's doubles =

Men's doubles at the 2026 Asian Table Tennis Championships
- Venue: Olimpiya shaharchasi
- Date: 19–25 October 2026
- Competitors: 53 pairs from 29 nations

The Men's doubles at the 2026 Asian Table Tennis Championships will be held in Tashkent, Uzbekistan from 19 to 25 October 2026.

Lin Shidong and Huang Youzheng won their first Men's doubles gold medal in Asian Championship. They will be qualified to 2027 World Table Tennis Championships and 2027 Doubles World Cup.

== Format and Qualification ==
The tournament is played in a straight single-elimination knockout format. All matches across all stages of the competition are played as a best-of-five (5) games.

Seedings for the draw are determined by the ITTF World Ranking (Week 35/2026).

=== 2027 World Championships and World Cup Qualification ===
This event serves as the official Asian qualification tournament for the 2027 World Table Tennis Championships. Asia has been allocated a total of 14 continental quotas for the Men's doubles event. The qualification spots are determined as follows:

- The 8 winners of the Round of 16 automatically qualify. (Note: Qualified means they will guarantee getting a spot in 2027 World Championships, but final decision is based on each association. For instance, China and Japan might have different qualification selection based on World Ranking or national qualification matches. Even these players reach beyond Round of 16, their participation might be revoked.)
- The 8 losers of the Round of 16 will play one round of knockout matches; the 4 winners of these matches qualify.
- The 4 losers of the previous qualification round will play a progressive knockout to determine positions 13 to 16. The pairs finishing in 13th and 14th place will secure the final two qualification spots.
- The pairs finishing in 15th and 16th place will be designated as the Asian continental reserves.

Additionally, the winners (gold medalists) of the Men's doubles event will automatically qualify for the 2027 Doubles World Cup.

== Seeds ==
- Seeding was determined by combining the individual doubles rankings; the lower the combined ranking, the higher the seeding.
1. (China) Lin Shidong / Huang Youzheng
2. (China) Wen Ruibo / Yuan Licen
3. (Hong Kong) Wong Chun Ting / Chan Baldwin
4. (Singapore) Pang Koen / Izaac Quek
5. (Chinese Taipei) Feng Yi-hsin / Kuo Guan-hong
6. (India) Manav Thakkar / Payas Jain
7. (Japan) Sora Matsushima / Shunsuke Togami
8. (Japan) Tomokazu Harimoto / Hiroto Shinozuka
9. (Singapore) Chew Clarence / Chua Josh
10. (Saudi Arabia) Ali Alkhdrawi / Abdulaziz Bu Shulaybi
11. (Hong Kong) Lam Siu Hang / Yiu Kwan To
12. (Kazakhstan) Kirill Gerassimenko / Alan Kurmangaliyev
13. (Philippines) John Russel Misal / Jann Mari Nayre
14. (South Korea) Kim Minhyeok / Park Gyuhyeon
15. (Malaysia) Wong Qi Shen / Choong Javen
16. (Iran) Noshad Alamian / Nima Alamian

== Main Draw ==
=== Finals ===
Semifinals						Final
1	(China) Lin Shidong (China) Huang Youzheng		11	11	11
4	(Singapore) Koen Pang (Singapore) Izaac Quek (bronze)		1	9	9	1	(China) Lin Shidong (China) Huang Youzheng (gold)	8	11	11	11
3	(Hong Kong) Wong Chun Ting (Hong Kong) Chan Baldwin (bronze)	7	5	11	3	2	(China) Wen Ruibo (China) Yuan Licen (silver)	11	7	5	6
2	(China) Wen Ruibo (China) Yuan Licen	11	11	9	11

=== Top Half ===
==== Section 1 ====
Round of 64
(South Korea) Kang D. (South Korea) Lim Y.	11	11	11
(Bangladesh) Bawm R. (Bangladesh) Ridoy M.	4	5	6
(Indonesia) Pratama A. (Indonesia) Susilo B.	11	11	11
(Turkmenistan) Allanazarov Y. (Turkmenistan) Meredov V.	7	5	3
(Qatar) Abdulwahhab A. (Qatar) Abdulwahhab M.	3	9	8
11	(Hong Kong) Lam S. H. (Hong Kong) Yiu K. T.	11	11	11
(Kyrgyzstan) Ergeshov A. (Kyrgyzstan) Iakupbaev A.	7	6	5
(Iraq) Hameed A. (Iraq) Taher M.	11	11	11
(Kuwait) Alhadad A. (Kuwait) Alotaibi M.
(Macau) Mak T. I. (Macau) Wang C.	w/o

Round of 32
1	(China) Lin S. (China) Huang Y.	11	11	11
(South Korea) Kang D. (South Korea) Lim Y.	1	1	9
(Indonesia) Pratama A. (Indonesia) Susilo B.	11	3	2	2
11	(Hong Kong) Lam S. H. (Hong Kong) Yiu K. T.	7	11	11	11
12	(Kazakhstan) Gerassimenko K. (Kazakhstan) Kurmangaliyev A.	11	11	11
(Iraq) Hameed A. (Iraq) Taher M.	3	4	7
(Macau) Mak T. I. (Macau) Wang C.	8	8	6
8	(Japan) Harimoto T. (Japan) Shinozuka H.	11	11	11

Round of 16
1	(China) Lin S. (China) Huang Y.	11	11	11
11	(Hong Kong) Lam S. H. (Hong Kong) Yiu K. T.	6	6	8
12	(Kazakhstan) Gerassimenko K. (Kazakhstan) Kurmangaliyev A.	8	5	13
8	(Japan) Harimoto T. (Japan) Shinozuka H.	11	11	15

Quarterfinals
1	(China) Lin S. (China) Huang Y.	11	11	11	11
8	(Japan) Harimoto T. (Japan) Shinozuka H.	7	13	5	6

==== Section 2 ====
Round of 64
(Oman) Al Ghassani G. (Oman) Al Rashdi B.	11	11	5	7	11
(Tajikistan) Aliev M. (Tajikistan) Odinaev N.	8	6	11	11	4
(Sri Lanka) Ginige C. (Sri Lanka) Kahawaththa N.	8	6	9
(Bahrain) Abuhamda S. (Bahrain) Saleh A.	11	11	11
(Philippines) Tormis E. (Philippines) Valenet E.	7	5	5
15	(Malaysia) Wong Q. S. (Malaysia) Choong J.	11	11	11
16	(Iran) Alamian N. (Iran) Alamiyan N.	11	11	12
(Saudi Arabia) Al Taher A. (Saudi Arabia) Alsuwailem S.	3	6	10
(Maldives) Ismail M. (Maldives) Muhammad I.	4	8	8
(Uzbekistan) Akhmedov K. (Uzbekistan) Toliev M.	11	11	11
(United Arab Emirates) Almusayebi A. (United Arab Emirates) Almusayebi M.	5	1	5
(Thailand) Prasongpol N. (Thailand) Mekamporn N.	11	11	11

Round of 32
5	(Chinese Taipei) Feng Y. H. (Chinese Taipei) Kuo G. H.	11	11	11
(Oman) Al Ghassani G. (Oman) Al Rashdi B.	5	2	8
(Bahrain) Abuhamda S. (Bahrain) Saleh A.	11	6	8	3
15	(Malaysia) Wong Q. S. (Malaysia) Choong J.	7	11	11	11
16	(Iran) Alamian N. (Iran) Alamiyan N.	11	11	11
(Uzbekistan) Akhmedov K. (Uzbekistan) Toliev M.	6	5	9
(Thailand) Prasongpol N. (Thailand) Mekamporn N.	5	3	3
4	(Singapore) Pang K. (Singapore) Quek I.	11	11	11

Round of 16
5	(Chinese Taipei) Feng Y. H. (Chinese Taipei) Kuo G. H.	8	6	6
15	(Malaysia) Wong Q. S. (Malaysia) Choong J.	11	11	11
16	(Iran) Alamian N. (Iran) Alamiyan N.	11	11	5	4	2
4	(Singapore) Pang K. (Singapore) Quek I.	7	9	11	11	11

Quarterfinals
15	(Malaysia) Wong Q. S. (Malaysia) Choong J.	9	7	9
4	(Singapore) Pang K. (Singapore) Quek I.	11	11	11

=== Bottom Half ===
==== Section 3 ====
Round of 64
(Indonesia) Junindra M. (Indonesia) Negara M.	11	11	11
(Kyrgyzstan) Moldaliev T. (Kyrgyzstan) Sagyndykov T.	4	3	8
(Sri Lanka) Silva S. (Sri Lanka) Kulappuwawadu C.	5	5	6
(Macau) Zheng H. W. (Macau) Chan C. I.	11	11	11
(Uzbekistan) Dilshodov D. (Uzbekistan) Iskandarov S.	6	9	9
10	(Saudi Arabia) Alkhadrawi A. (Saudi Arabia) Bu Shulaybi A.	11	11	11
(Kuwait) Almkeemy A. (Kuwait) Alkanderi M.	11	11	11
(United Arab Emirates) Alhawai Y. (United Arab Emirates) Almarri N.	7	8	6
(Iran) Ghaffari A. (Iran) Faraji B.	11	11	11
(Tajikistan) Abdukodirov A. (Tajikistan) Fuzaili R.	4	8	9

Round of 32
3	(Hong Kong) Wong C. T. (Hong Kong) Chan B.	10	11	11	11
(Indonesia) Junindra M. (Indonesia) Negara M.	12	3	8	2
(Macau) Zheng H. W. (Macau) Chan C. I.	3	4	12
10	(Saudi Arabia) Alkhadrawi A. (Saudi Arabia) Bu Shulaybi A.	11	11	14
13	(Philippines) Misal J. R. (Philippines) Nayre J. M.	11	11	11
(Kuwait) Almkeemy A. (Kuwait) Alkanderi M.	3	4	7
(Iran) Ghaffari A. (Iran) Faraji B.	w/o
7	(Japan) Matsushima S. (Japan) Togami S.

Round of 16
3	(Hong Kong) Wong C. T. (Hong Kong) Chan B.	11	11	11
10	(Saudi Arabia) Alkhadrawi A. (Saudi Arabia) Bu Shulaybi A.	5	7	9
13	(Philippines) Misal J. R. (Philippines) Nayre J. M.	11	13	11
(Iran) Ghaffari A. (Iran) Faraji B.	6	11	7

Quarterfinals
3	(Hong Kong) Wong C. T. (Hong Kong) Chan B.	11	8	10	11	11
13	(Philippines) Misal J. R. (Philippines) Nayre J. M.	6	11	12	7	8

==== Section 4 ====
Round of 64
(Kazakhstan) Kenzhigulov A. (Kazakhstan) Zhubanov S.	11	11	11
(Oman) Al Balushi M. (Oman) Al Riyami A.	8	6	6
(Malaysia) Im J. Z. (Malaysia) Yap R. Z.	11	11	6	11
(Jordan) Abo Yaman Z. (Jordan) Aldmaisy Z.	7	5	11	9
14	(South Korea) Kim M. (South Korea) Park G.	6	11	11	11
(Thailand) Sanguansin P. (Thailand) Tancharoen S.	11	2	8	9
(Turkmenistan) Allanazarov D. (Turkmenistan) Artykov M.	8	3	3
(Bahrain) Rashed R. (Bahrain) Saleh M.	11	11	11
(Mongolia) Tuvshinjargal U. (Mongolia) Buyan T.	8	2	3
(Chinese Taipei) Hsu H. C. (Chinese Taipei) Hung J. K.	11	11	11

Round of 32
6	(India) Jain P. (India) Thakkar M.	11	11	11	11
(Kazakhstan) Kenzhigulov A. (Kazakhstan) Zhubanov S.	9	13	7	7
(Malaysia) Im J. Z. (Malaysia) Yap R. Z.	8	6	9
9	(Singapore) Chew C. (Singapore) Chua J.	11	11	11
14	(South Korea) Kim M. (South Korea) Park G.	9	11	11	11
(Bahrain) Rashed R. (Bahrain) Saleh M.	11	5	6	7
(Chinese Taipei) Hsu H. C. (Chinese Taipei) Hung J. K.	7	7	11	7
2	(China) Wen R. (China) Yuan L.	11	11	7	11

Round of 16
6	(India) Jain P. (India) Thakkar M.	11	11	11
9	(Singapore) Chew C. (Singapore) Chua J.	5	4	8
14	(South Korea) Kim M. (South Korea) Park G.	5	11	7	11	5
2	(China) Wen R. (China) Yuan L.	11	8	11	6	11

Quarterfinals
6	(India) Jain P. (India) Thakkar M.	11	3	10	4
2	(China) Wen R. (China) Yuan L.	7	11	12	11

== Qualification Playoff (Round of 16 Losers) ==
(Note: Alamian brothers from Iran did not show up, and their final ranking is 15-16th. It guarantees they will not directly get the continental quota to 2027 ITTF World Championship unless qualified teams withdrew, but they can qualify through World Ranking or regional qualification matches.)

=== Match 1 ===
Position 9-16 (Loser will move forward to 13-16 position bracket)
11	(Hong Kong) Lam S. H. (Hong Kong) Yiu K. T.	11	5	11	9	11
12	(Kazakhstan) Gerassimenko K. (Kazakhstan) Kurmangaliyev A.	7	11	7	11	6

=== Match 2 ===
Position 9-16 (Loser will move forward to 13-16 position bracket)
5	(Chinese Taipei) Feng Y. H. (Chinese Taipei) Kuo G. H.	w/o
16	(Iran) Alamian N. (Iran) Alamiyan N.

=== Match 3 ===
Position 9-16 (Loser will move forward to 13-16 position bracket)
10	(Saudi Arabia) Alkhadrawi A. (Saudi Arabia) Bu Shulaybi A.	10	2	11	12	7
	(Iran) Ghaffari A. (Iran) Faraji B.	12	11	9	10	11

=== Match 4 ===
Position 9-16 (Loser will move forward to 13-16 position bracket)
9	(Singapore) Chew C. (Singapore) Chua J.	13	14	10	11	5
14	(South Korea) Kim M. (South Korea) Park G.	15	12	12	7	11

=== 13-16th position matches ===
13-16th Match 1 (Loser in Qualification Play-off Match 1-4 will be randomly placed here)
12	(Kazakhstan) Gerassimenko K. (Kazakhstan) Kurmangaliyev A.	w/o
16	(Iran) Alamian N. (Iran) Alamiyan N.

13-16th Match 2 (Loser in Qualification Play-off Match 1-4 will be randomly placed here)
10	(Saudi Arabia) Alkhadrawi A. (Saudi Arabia) Bu Shulaybi A.	11	11	11
9	(Singapore) Chew C. (Singapore) Chua J.	8	9	7
