= Chen Zhongliu =

Chinese footballer (born 1993)

Chen Zhongliu 陈中流
Personal information
- Date of birth: 30 September 1993 (age 33)
- Place of birth: Duyun, Guizhou, China
- Height: 1.84 m (6 ft 1/2 in)
- Position: Midfielder

Youth career
- 2001–2006: Shenzhen Yantian Sports School
- 2006–2011: Hangzhou Greentown

Senior career*
Years	Team	Apps	(Gls)
2011	Wenzhou Provenza	16	(0)
2012–2017	Hangzhou Greentown	65	(3)
2018–2019	Chongqing Lifan	0	(0)
2020	Suzhou Dongwu	9	(0)
2021–2022	Cangzhou Mighty Lions	23	(0)

International career^{‡}
2011–2012	China U-20		
2017	China	1	(0)
- * Club domestic league appearances and goals as of 20 December 2023 ‡ National team caps and goals as of 10 January 2017

Chen Zhongliu
- Simplified Chinese: 陈中流
- Traditional Chinese: 陳中流
Transcriptions
Standard Mandarin
- Hanyu Pinyin: Chén Zhōngliú
- IPA: [ʈʂʰə̌n ʈʂʊ́ŋ ljǒʊ]

Chen Zhongliu (Chinese: 陈中流; pinyin: Chén Zhōngliú; born 30 September 1993 in Duyun) is a Chinese former football player. He is of the Dong Chinese ethnic minority.

== Club career ==
Chen joined Hangzhou Greentown youth team system from Shenzhen Yantian Sports School in 2006. In 2011, he was loaned to China League Two club Wenzhou Provenza for one year. Chen played 16 times in the 2011 league season. He was promoted to Hangzhou Greentown's first team squad by Takeshi Okada in 2012. Okada described Chen as a high potential player, and he said that even in Japan or Netherlands, it's hard to find a player at Chen's age could play as good as Chen did.

On 11 March 2012, Chen made his Super League debut in the first round of the season which Hangzhou Greentown played against Qingdao Jonoon. However, after he was late for training for three times, Chen was sent to the U19 team by Okada in April. Chen returned to the first team in June and played in the third round of the 2012 Chinese FA Cup, in which Hangzhou Greentown beat Shanghai Tellace 3-0 on 26 June. On 23 July, he scored his first senior goal in the fourth round of the FA Cup, in which Hangzhou Greentown beat Chengdu Blades 2–1.

In February 2018, Chen transferred to Chinese Super League side Chongqing Dangdai Lifan. He would not play for Chongqing in his debut season and was moved to the reserve squad in the following season before joining second tier club Suzhou Dongwu on 9 September 2020. After one season with Suzhou, Chen would join top tier club Cangzhou Mighty Lions on 31 March 2021. He would go on to make his debut in a league game on 9 May 2021 against Guangzhou F.C. in a 2-0 defeat.

== International career ==
Chen was first called up for China U-20 by Jan Olde Riekerink in July 2011. He scored two goals in four appearances in 2012 AFC U-19 Championship qualification as China U-20 managed to qualify into the 2012 AFC U-19 Championship. On 10 January 2017, Chen made his debut for the Chinese national team in the 2017 China Cup against Iceland, coming on as a substitution for Yin Hongbo in the 57th minute.

== Career statistics ==
Statistics accurate as of match played 31 January 2023.

Appearances and goals by club, season and competition
Club	Season	League			National Cup		Continental		Other		Total	
Club	Season	Division	Apps	Goals	Apps	Goals	Apps	Goals	Apps	Goals	Apps	Goals
Wenzhou Provenza	2011	China League Two	16	0	-		-		-		16	0
Hangzhou Greentown	2012	Chinese Super League	8	0	3	1	-		-		11	1
Hangzhou Greentown	2013	Chinese Super League	7	2	2	0	-		-		9	2
Hangzhou Greentown	2014	Chinese Super League	16	1	2	0	-		-		18	1
Hangzhou Greentown	2015	Chinese Super League	9	0	1	0	-		-		10	0
Hangzhou Greentown	2016	Chinese Super League	23	0	1	0	-		-		24	0
Hangzhou Greentown	2017	China League One	2	0	0	0	-		-		2	0
Hangzhou Greentown	Total		65	3	9	1	0	0	0	0	74	4
Chongqing Dangdai	2018	Chinese Super League	0	0	0	0	-		-		0	0
Suzhou Dongwu	2020	China League One	9	0	0	0	-		-		9	0
Cangzhou Mighty Lions	2021	Chinese Super League	6	0	2	0	-		-		8	0
Cangzhou Mighty Lions	2022	Chinese Super League	17	0	2	1	-		-		19	1
Cangzhou Mighty Lions	Total		23	0	4	1	0	0	0	0	27	1
Career total			113	3	13	2	0	0	0	0	126	5
