= Woranat Thongkruea =

Thai footballer (born 1993)

Personal information
- Full name: Woranat Thongkruea
- Date of birth: 28 March 1993 (age 33)
- Place of birth: Nakhon Ratchasima, Thailand
- Height: 1.72 m (5 ft 7 1/2 in)
- Position: Midfielder

Youth career
- 2005–2009: JMG Academy
- 2010: Muangthong United

Senior career*
Years	Team	Apps	(Gls)
2010–2016	Muangthong United	6	(1)
2012	→ Suphanburi (loan)	4	(0)
2012–2013	→ Nakhon Ratchasima (loan)	15	(3)
2013	→ Nakhon Nayok (loan)	23	(4)
2014	→ Bangkok (loan)	26	(2)
2015	→ Pattaya United (loan)	0	(0)
2015	→ Nakhon Ratchasima (loan)	0	(0)
2016	→ Pattaya United (loan)	20	(2)
2017–2018	Pattaya United	41	(3)
2019	Samut Prakan City	6	(0)
2020	Sukhothai	2	(0)
2021	Trat	7	(0)
2021	Sisaket	12	(1)
2022–2024	Khon Kaen United	26	(1)
2024–2025	Phrae United	10	(0)

International career
2011–2012	Thailand U19	6	(1)
- * Club domestic league appearances and goals

Woranat Thongkruea (Thai: วรนาถ ทองเครือ, born March 28, 1993), simply known as Co (Thai: โก้), is a Thai professional footballer who plays as a midfielder.

== International career ==
Woranat won the AFF U-19 Youth Championship with Thailand U19, and played in 2012 AFC U-19 Championship.

=== International goals ===
==== Under-19 ====
#	Date	Venue	Opponent	Score	Result	Competition
1.	3 November 2012	Fujairah Club Stadium, Fujairah, United Arab Emirates	China	2-0	2-1	2012 AFC U-19 Championship

== Honours ==
=== Club ===
Muangthong United

- Thai League 1: 2010
- Kor Royal Cup: 2010

=== International ===
Thailand U-19

- AFF U-19 Youth Championship: 2011
