= Adisorn Promrak =

Thai footballer (born 1993)

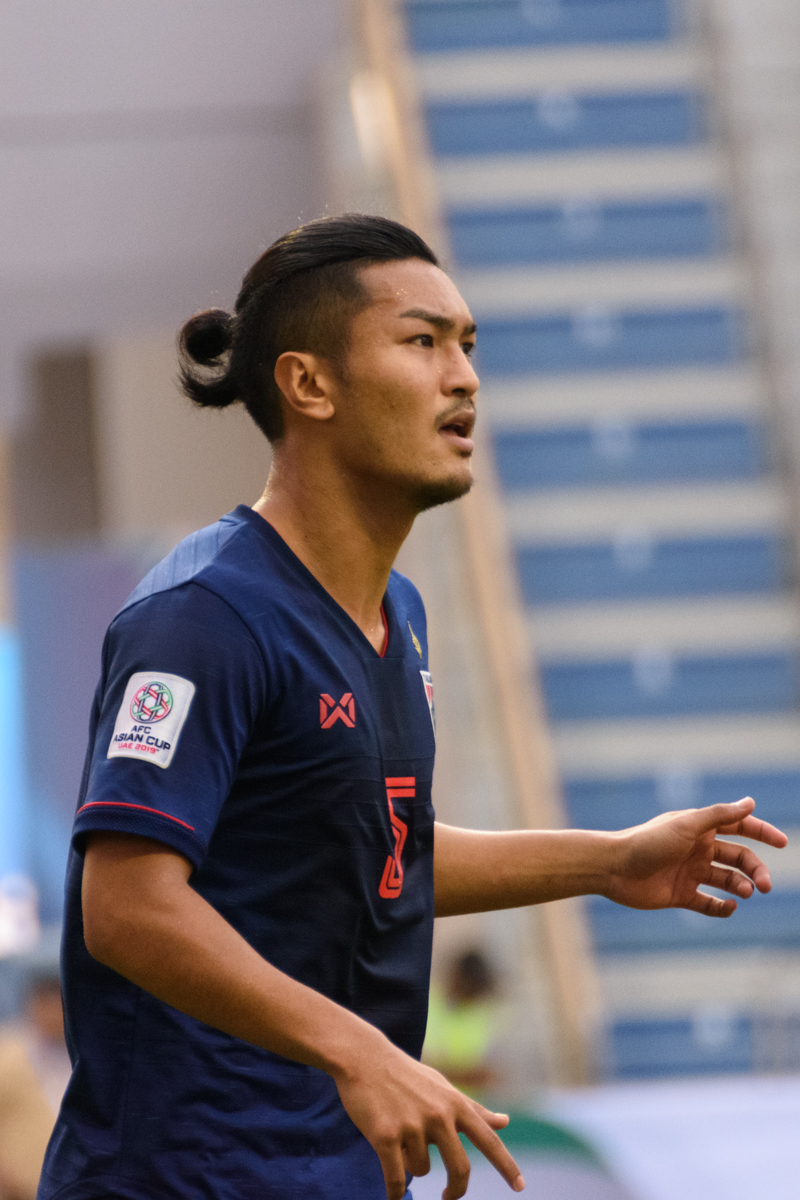
- Adisorn playing for Thailand in 2019

Personal information
- Full name: Adisorn Promrak
- Date of birth: 21 October 1993 (age 33)
- Place of birth: Sadao, Songkhla, Thailand
- Height: 1.75 m (5 ft 9 in)
- Positions: Centre back; right back

Team information
- Current team: Ratchaburi
- Number: 15

Youth career
- 2005–2010: Suankularb Wittayalai School
- 2010–2011: Buriram United

Senior career*
Years	Team	Apps	(Gls)
2012–2013	Army United	48	(0)
2014–2016	BEC Tero Sasana	52	(0)
2016–2020	Muangthong United	74	(2)
2020–2023	Port	16	(0)
2022–2023	→ Nongbua Pitchaya (loan)	11	(1)
2023–	Ratchaburi	54	(1)

International career
2011–2012	Thailand U19	10	(1)
2014–2016	Thailand U23	13	(0)
2014–2026	Thailand	33	(0)
Medal record
Thailand under-23
Sea Games
Gold medal – first place	Sea Games 2015	Football
Thailand
Asean Football Championship
Winner	Suzuki Cup 2014	2014
Winner	Suzuki Cup 2016	2016
Runner-up	Hyundai Cup 2026	2026
- * Club domestic league appearances and goals as of 01:24, 15 September 2026 (UTC)

Adisorn Promrak (Thai: อดิศร พรหมรักษ์, born 21 October 1993), simply known as Keng (Thai: เก่ง) is a Thai professional footballer who plays as a centre back or a right back for Thai League 1 club Ratchaburi and the Thailand national team.

== International career ==
Adisorn won the AFF U-19 Youth Championship with Thailand U19 and played in 2012 AFC U-19 Championship. He represented Thailand U23 in the 2014 Asian Games. Adisorn is part of Thailand's squad in the 2014 AFF Suzuki Cup. Adisorn won the 2015 Southeast Asian Games with Thailand U23, and is the team's vice-captain. In 2016 Adisorn was selected in Thailand U23 squad for 2016 AFC U-23 Championship in Qatar.

=== International ===
As of 6 November 2023

National team	Year	Apps	Goals
Thailand	2014	5	0
Thailand	2015	0	0
Thailand	2016	11	0
Thailand	2017	8	0
Thailand	2018	1	0
Thailand	2019	6	0
Thailand	2023	1	0
Total		32	0

== Honours ==
=== Club ===
BEC Tero Sasana

- Thai League Cup (1): 2014

Muangthong United

- Thai League 1 (1): 2016
- Thai League Cup (2): 2016, 2017
- Thailand Champions Cup (1): 2017
- Mekong Club Championship (1): 2017

=== International ===
Thailand U-19

- AFF U-19 Youth Championship (1); 2011

Thailand U-23

- Sea Games Gold Medal (1); 2015
- BIDC Cup (Cambodia) (1): 2013

Thailand

- ASEAN Football Championship (2): 2014, 2016
- King's Cup (2): 2016, 2017
