= Valid Mashaeizadeh =

Iranian footballer

Personal information
- Full name: Valid Mashaeizadeh
- Date of birth: January 11, 1993 (age 33)
- Place of birth: Ahvaz, Iran
- Height: 1.74 m (5 ft 8 1/2 in)
- Position: Attacking midfielder

Team information
- Current team: Foolad

Youth career
- 2007–2014: Foolad

Senior career*
| Years | Team | Apps | (Gls) |
| 2012– | Foolad | 1 | (0) |
| 2015–2016 | → Niroo Zamini (loan) | 0 | (0) |

International career^{‡}
| 2008–2011 | Iran U-17 | | |
| 2011–2012 | Iran U-20 | 6 | (1) |
| 2014–2016 | Iran U-23 | 1 | (0) |
- * Club domestic league appearances and goals as of 31 July 2014 ‡ National team caps and goals as of 15 January 2014

Valid Mashaeizadeh (Persian: ولید مشاعی‌زاده) is an Iranian football midfielder who plays for Niroo Zamini on loan from Foolad.

== Club career ==
=== Foolad ===
He started his career with Foolad from youth levels. Later he joined to first team by Hossein Faraki. He made his debut for Foolad in the first fixture of the 2014–15 Iran Pro League against Tractor Sazi as a substitute, where he assisted Leonard Mesarić to score Foolad's only goal.

== Club career statistics ==
As of 31 July 2014

| Club | Division | Season | League | | Hazfi Cup | | Asia | | Total | |
| Club | Division | Season | Apps | Goals | Apps | Goals | Apps | Goals | Apps | Goals |
|---|---|---|---|---|---|---|---|---|---|---|
| Foolad | Pro League | 2012–13 | 0 | 0 | 0 | 0 | – | – | 0 | 0 |
| Foolad | Pro League | 2013–14 | 0 | 0 | 0 | 0 | 1 | 0 | 1 | 0 |
| Foolad | Pro League | 2014–15 | 1 | 0 | 0 | 0 | 0 | 0 | 1 | 0 |
| Career Totals | | | 1 | 0 | 0 | 0 | 1 | 0 | 2 | 0 |

== International career ==
=== U17 ===
He played two marches at the 2010 Asian U16 Championships.

=== U20 ===
He was part of Iran U–20 during 2012 AFC U-19 Championship qualification, 2012 CIS Cup, 2012 AFF U-19 Youth Championship and 2012 AFC U-19 Championship.

=== U23 ===
He invited to Iran U-23 training camp by Nelo Vingada to preparation for Incheon 2014 and 2016 AFC U-22 Championship (Summer Olympic qualification).

== Honours ==
Foolad

- Iran Pro League (1): 2013–14
