= Itthipol Yodprom =

Thai footballer (born 1994)

Personal information
- Full name: Itthipol Yodprom
- Date of birth: May 25, 1994 (age 32)
- Place of birth: Bangkok, Thailand
- Height: 1.66 m (5 ft 5 1/2 in)
- Position: Midfielder

Team information
- Current team: Osotspa Saraburi

Youth career
- 2010: Osotspa Saraburi

Senior career*
Years	Team	Apps	(Gls)
2011–	Osotspa Saraburi		

International career
2011–2012	Thailand U19		
- * Club domestic league appearances and goals as of 13 October 2013

Itthipol Yodprom (Thai: อิทธิพล ยอดพรหม), is a Thai professional footballer who plays as a midfielder for Thai Premier League club Osotspa Samut Prakan.

== International career ==
Itthipol won the AFF U-19 Youth Championship with Thailand U19, and played in 2012 AFC U-19 Championship.

== International goals ==
=== Under-19 ===
#	Date	Venue	Opponent	Score	Result	Competition
1.	13 September 2011	Thuwunna Stadium, Yangon, Myanmar	Cambodia	2-0	5-0	2011 AFF U-19 Youth Championship

== Honours ==
=== International ===
Thailand U-19

- AFF U-19 Youth Championship: 2011
