= Ali Qasim Mshari =

Iraqi footballer

Personal information
- Full name: Ali Qasim Mshari
- Date of birth: January 20, 1994 (age 32)
- Place of birth: Iraq
- Height: 1.72 m (5 ft 8 in)
- Position: Striker

Team information
- Current team: Amanat Baghdad

Senior career*
Years	Team	Apps	(Gls)
2010–2013	Al-Zawraa		
2013–2014	Duhok SC	1	(1)
2014–2015	Al Masafi		
2015–2020	Al-Naft		
2020–	Amanat Baghdad		

International career^{‡}
2011–2013	Iraq U20	8	(3)
2013–2016	Iraq U23	2	(0)
2013	Iraq	1	(0)
- * Club domestic league appearances and goals as of 20 July 2010 ‡ National team caps and goals as of August 14, 2013

Ali Qasim Mshari (Arabic: عَلِيّ قَاسِم مَشَارِيّ, born January 20, 1994) is an Iraqi professional footballer who currently plays for Amanat Baghdad in the Iraqi Premier League.

== International debut ==
On August 14, 2013 Ali made his first international cap with Iraq against Chile in a friendly match.

== Honours ==
=== International ===
Iraq Youth team

- 2012 AFC U-19 Championship: runner-up
- 2013 FIFA U-20 World Cup: 4th Place

== International statistics ==
=== Iraq national under-20 team goals ===
Goals are correct excluding friendly matches and unrecognized tournaments such as Arab U-20 Championship.

Ali Qasim – goals for Iraq Youth Team
#	Date	Venue	Opponent	Score	Result	Competition
1	October 29, 2011	Bangabandhu National Stadium, Dhaka, Bangladesh	Maldives	2–0	9–0	2012 AFC U-19 Championship qual.
2	October 31, 2011	Bangabandhu National Stadium, Dhaka, Bangladesh	Oman	2–0	4–1	2012 AFC U-19 Championship qual.
3	October 31, 2011	Bangabandhu National Stadium, Dhaka, Bangladesh	Oman	3–0	4–1	2012 AFC U-19 Championship qual.
