= Athit Wisetsilp =

Thai footballer (born 1993)

Personal information
- Full name: Athit Wisetsilp
- Date of birth: 26 September 1993 (age 33)
- Place of birth: Bangkok, Thailand
- Height: 1.70 m (5 ft 7 in)
- Position: Midfielder

Youth career
- 2011: Osotspa

Senior career*
Years	Team	Apps	(Gls)
2012–2017	Osotspa Saraburi	0	(0)
2013	→ Thai Honda (loan)	14	(0)
2014	→ Phuket (loan)	19	(0)
2015	→ Siam Navy (loan)	0	(0)
2015	→ Hua Hin City (loan)	17	(0)
2016	→ Songkhla United (loan)	21	(5)
2017–2018	Sukhothai	0	(0)
2017	→ Lampang (loan)	11	(0)
2018	Kasetsart	6	(0)
2018–2019	Thai Honda	28	(2)
2020	Trat	1	(0)
2020–2021	Lamphun Warrior	14	(2)
2021	Chainat United	7	(0)
2021–2022	Nakhon Si United	9	(0)
2022	Pattaya Dolphins United	7	(0)
2023	Bangkok	4	(0)

International career
2011–2012	Thailand U19	4	(3)
- * Club domestic league appearances and goals as of 9 December 2023

Athit Wisetsilp (Thai: อาทิตย์ วิเศษศิลป์; born September 26, 1993) is a Thai professional footballer who plays as a central midfielder.

== International career ==
Athit won the AFF U-19 Youth Championship with Thailand U19, and played in 2012 AFC U-19 Championship.

== International goals ==
=== Under-19 ===
#	Date	Venue	Opponent	Score	Result	Competition
1.	17 September 2011	Thuwunna Stadium, Yangon, Myanmar	Singapore	2–0	3–0	2011 AFF U-19 Youth Championship
2.	17 September 2011	Thuwunna Stadium, Yangon, Myanmar	Singapore	3–0	3–0	2011 AFF U-19 Youth Championship
3.	September 21, 2011	Thuwunna Stadium, Yangon, Myanmar	Vietnam	1–0	1–1	2011 AFF U-19 Youth Championship

== Honours ==
=== Domestic ===
Lamphun Warriors

- Thai League 3: 2020–21

=== International ===
Thailand U-19

- AFF U-19 Youth Championship: 2011
