= Saleh Mohammad =

Saleh Mohammad may refer to:

- Saleh Mohammad (Afghan politician)
- Saleh Mohammad (Indian politician) (born 1977)
- Saleh Mohammad (swimmer) (born 1986), Syrian swimmer
- Saleh Mohammad (snooker player) (born 1973), snooker player from Afghanistan
- Saleh Mohammed (weightlifter) (born 1965), Iraqi weightlifter
- Saleh Muhammad Khan, Pakistani politician
