= Muath Mahmoud =

Jordanian footballer

Personal information
- Full name: Muath Mahmoud Mosleh
- Date of birth: 18 April 1993 (age 33)
- Place of birth: Irbid, Jordan
- Position: Forward

Team information
- Current team: Al-Sareeh
- Number: 27

Youth career
- 2006–2013: Al-Karmel

Senior career*
Years	Team	Apps	(Gls)
2013–2014	Al-Jazeera		
2014–2017	Al-Sareeh		
2017–2018	Al-Baqa'a		
2018–2020	Al-Hussein		
2020–	Al-Sareeh		

International career^{‡}
2011–2012	Jordan U-19		(3)
2013–2014	Jordan U-23		
- * Club domestic league appearances and goals as of 10 September 2013 ‡ National team caps and goals as of 10 September 2013

Muath Mahmoud Mosleh is a Jordanian footballer who plays as a forward for Al-Sareeh.

== International goals ==
=== With U-19 ===
#	Date	Venue	Opponent	Score	Result	Competition
1	May 30, 2011	Amman	Syria	1-1	Draw	U-19 Friendly
2	August 5, 2011	Beirut	Lebanon	2-1	Win	U-19 Friendly
3	November 4, 2011	Doha	Bahrain	3-0	Win	2012 AFC U-19 Championship qualification

=== None-International goals ===
#	Date	Venue	Opponent	Score	Result	Competition
1	August 27, 2011	Istanbul	Turkey Beşiktaş J.K.	1-1	Draw	None-International Friendly
2	August 28, 2011	Istanbul	Turkey Gaziantepspor	3-1	Win	None-International Friendly
3	October 12, 2012	Istanbul	Turkey Sultan Bailey	3-1	Win	None-International Friendly
