= Ahmad Israiwah =

Jordanian footballer

Personal information
- Full name: Ahmad Nawaf Abdel-Aziz Israiwah
- Date of birth: 23 January 1994 (age 32)
- Place of birth: Riyadh, Saudi Arabia
- Height: 1.75 m (5 ft 9 in)
- Position: Midfielder

Team information
- Current team: Kuching City

Youth career
- 2008–2013: Al-Wehdat

Senior career*
Years	Team	Apps	(Gls)
2013–2016	Al-Wehdat		
2014	→ Al-Qadisiyah (loan)		
2016–2017	Al-Orobah		
2017–2019	Al-Faisaly		
2019–2020	Al-Salt		
2020	Sahab		
2020–2022	Al-Salt		
2022–2024	Al-Wehdat		
2024	Al-Ahli		
2025	Al-Nahda		
2025	PDRM	11	(0)
2025–	Kuching City	0	(0)

International career^{‡}
2009–2010	Jordan U17		
2011–2012	Jordan U19		
2013–2016	Jordan U23		
2013–2021	Jordan	11	
- * Club domestic league appearances and goals as of 11 August 2025 ‡ National team caps and goals as of 16 January 2015

Ahmad Nawaf Abdel-Aziz Israiwah (Arabic: أحمد نواف عبد العزيز سريوة) is a footballer who plays as a midfielder for Malaysia Super League club Kuching City. Born in Saudi Arabia, he represented Jordan internationally.

Israiwah has two brothers; an older brother named Abdel-Aziz and a younger one named Osama.

== International career ==
Israiwah's first match with the Jordan national senior team was against Kuwait on 9 October 2013 in an international friendly which resulted in a 1–1 draw for both teams.

== International goals ==
=== With U-19 ===
#	Date	Venue	Opponent	Score	Result	Competition
1	October 30, 2011	Doha	Bhutan	4-0	Win	2012 AFC U-19 Championship qualification
2	November 1, 2011	Doha	Tajikistan	4-1	Win	2012 AFC U-19 Championship qualification
3	November 1, 2011	Doha	Tajikistan	4-1	Win	2012 AFC U-19 Championship qualification
4	November 4, 2011	Doha	Bahrain	3-0	Win	2012 AFC U-19 Championship qualification

=== With U-23 ===
#	Date	Venue	Opponent	Score	Result	Competition
1	September 11, 2013	Dubai	United Arab Emirates	2-0	Win	U-23 Friendly

=== Non-International goals ===
#	Date	Venue	Opponent	Score	Result	Competition
1	September 5, 2012	Amman	Jordan Shabab Al-Hussein SC	3-2	Win	Non-International Friendly
2	May 16, 2013	Amman	Jordan Al-Ahli (Amman) U-19	2-0	Win	Non-International Friendly
3	November 7, 2013	Amman	Jordan Al-Faisaly (Amman)	4-1	Win	Non-International Friendly
4	February 11, 2014	Amman	Jordan Shabab Al-Ordon	2-2	Draw	Non-International Friendly
5	April 12, 2014	Amman	Jordan Al-Ahli (Amman)	3-0	Win	Non-International Friendly (2 Goals)
