= Mohammad Al-Emlah =

Jordanian footballer

Personal information
- Full name: Mohammad Samir Yusuf Al-Emlah
- Date of birth: 1993 (age 32–33)
- Position: Midfielder

Youth career
- 2007–2011: Shabab Al-Ordon

Senior career*
Years	Team	Apps	(Gls)
2011–2016	Shabab Al-Ordon		
2016–2018	Al-Baqa'a		
2018–	Al-Ahli		

International career
2011–2012	Jordan U-19		(1)
2013–2016	Jordan U-23		
- * Club domestic league appearances and goals

Mohammad Samir Yusuf Al-Emlah (Arabic: محمد سمير يوسف العملة)is a Jordanian football player.

== International goals ==
=== With U-19 ===
#	Date	Venue	Opponent	Score	Result	Competition
1	November 4, 2011	Doha	Bahrain	3-0	Win	2012 AFC U-19 Championship qualification

=== Non-International ===
#	Date	Venue	Opponent	Score	Result	Competition
1	April 28, 2012	Amman	Palestine Shabab Al-Am'ari	3-1	Loss	Non-International Friendly
2	August 30, 2012	Amman	Jordan Al-Sheikh Hussein FC	2-1	Win	Non-International Friendly
3	September 5, 2012	Amman	Jordan Shabab Al-Hussein SC	3-2	Win	Non-International Friendly
