= Saleh Mohammad (Afghan politician) =

Afghan politician

- Occupation: Legislator

Haji Saleh Mohammad was selected to represent Kunar Province in Afghanistan's Meshrano Jirga, the upper house of its National Legislature, in 2005. A report on Kunar prepared at the Navy Postgraduate School stated that he was "affiliated with Sedaqat". He was the chair of the Armed Services Committee.
