= Sultan Al-Kuwari =

Qatari footballer (born 1995)

Sultan Al Kuwari
Personal information
- Full name: Sultan Bakhit Al Kuwari
- Date of birth: 3 August 1995 (age 31)
- Place of birth: Doha, Qatar
- Height: 1.66 m (5 ft 5 1/2 in)
- Position: Winger

Youth career
- Aspire Academy

Senior career*
Years	Team	Apps	(Gls)
2014–2021	Al Rayyan	9	(0)
2014–2015	→ Villlarreal B (loan)	0	(0)
2016	→ Al-Sailiya SC (loan)	6	(0)
2017	→ Al-Shahania (loan)	0	(0)
2018–2019	→ Al-Shahania (loan)	16	(3)
2021–2022	Al-Shahania	-	(-)
2022–2023	Al-Markhiya	3	(0)
2023–2024	Al-Kharaitiyat	3	(2)

International career
2012–	Qatar U-20	3	(0)
- * Club domestic league appearances and goals

Sultan Al Kuwari (Arabic: سلطان الكواري; born August 3, 1995) is a Qatari footballer who currently plays as a winger. He also plays for Qatar's U–20 team. He graduated from the acclaimed Aspire Academy in 2013.

== Club career ==
Besides attending Aspire Academy, Kuwari played for Al Rayyan's youth teams. He made his first-team debut in November 2012 against Al Gharafa, but came to the forefront with the arrival of coach Manuel Jiménez, who succeeded in establishing many youth team players in the first-team. He had a trial with Spanish club Villarreal in October 2013. In April 2014, after his team was relegated to the Qatargas League, Rayyan loaned him out to Villarreal B for one season.

== Club career statistics ==
Statistics accurate as of 24 May 2014

Club	Season	League	League		Cup^{1}		League Cup^{2}		Continental^{3}		Total	
Club	Season	League	Apps	Goals	Apps	Goals	Apps	Goals	Apps	Goals	Apps	Goals
Al Rayyan	2012–13	QSL	1	0	0	0	0	0	0	0	1	0
Al Rayyan	2013–14	QSL	3	0	0	0	2	0	0	0	5	0
Total			4	0	0	0	2	0	0	0	6	0

^{1}Includes Emir of Qatar Cup.

^{2}Includes Sheikh Jassem Cup.

^{3}Includes AFC Champions League.

== International career ==
Kuwari was part of the Qatar's under–20 football team that competed in the 2012 AFC U-19 Championship. He made 3 appearances in the tournament.

== Honours ==
Last update: 24 May 2014.

- Emir of Qatar Cup

Winner (1): 2013

- Sheikh Jassem Cup

Winner (2): 2012–13, 2013–14
