= Kim Seung-jun (footballer) =

South Korean footballer

Personal information
- Date of birth: September 11, 1994 (age 32)
- Place of birth: South Korea
- Height: 1.81 m (5 ft 11 in)
- Position: Forward

Team information
- Current team: Suwon FC
- Number: 19

Senior career*
Years	Team	Apps	(Gls)
2015–2018	Ulsan Hyundai	90	(17)
2019–2020	Gyeongnam FC	31	(6)
2020	Busan IPark	11	(0)
2021-2022	Suwon FC	8	(0)

International career^{‡}
2013–2015	South Korea U23	7	(0)
- * Club domestic league appearances and goals as of 6 January 2020 ‡ National team caps and goals as of 13:55, 1 October 2015 (UTC)

- Kim Seung-jun
- Hangul: 김승준
- Hanja: 金承俊
- RR: Gim Seungjun
- MR: Kim Sŭngjun

Kim Seung-jun (Korean: 김승준; born 11 September 1994) is a South Korean football player, who plays for Suwon FC.

== Career statistics ==
As of 3 January 2023

Club	Season	League			Cup		Continental		Other		Total	
Club	Season	Division	Apps	Goals	Apps	Goals	Apps	Goals	Apps	Goals	Apps	Goals
Ulsan Hyundai	2015	K League 1	11	4	3	0	—		—		14	4
Ulsan Hyundai	2016	K League 1	30	8	2	0	—		—		32	8
Ulsan Hyundai	2017	K League 1	30	3	4	1	3	0	—		37	4
Ulsan Hyundai	2018	K League 1	19	2	5	1	6	1	—		30	4
Ulsan Hyundai	Total		90	17	14	2	9	1	—		113	20
Gyeongnam FC	2019	K League 1	29	6	2	1	6	2	1	0	38	9
Gyeongnam FC	2020	K League 2	1	0	0	0	—		—		1	0
Gyeongnam FC	Total		30	6	2	1	6	2	1	0	39	9
Busan IPark	2020	K League 1	11	0	1	0	—		—		12	0
Suwon FC	2021	K League 1	22	1	1	0	—		—		23	1
Suwon FC	2022	K League 1	32	5	1	0	—		—		33	5
Suwon FC	Total		54	6	2	0	—		—		56	6
Career total			185	29	19	3	15	3	1	0	220	35

== Honours ==
=== International ===
South Korea U20

- AFC U-19 Championship: 2012

South Korea U23

- King's Cup: 2015
