= Kim Young-chan =

South Korean footballer (born 1993)

Personal information
- Full name: Kim Young-chan
- Date of birth: 4 September 1993 (age 33)
- Place of birth: South Korea
- Height: 1.89 m (6 ft 2 in)
- Position: Centre back

Team information
- Current team: FC Anyang
- Number: 5

Youth career
- 2012: Korea University

Senior career*
Years	Team	Apps	(Gls)
2013–2020	Jeonbuk Hyundai	18	(0)
2013	→ Daegu FC (loan)	6	(0)
2014	→ Suwon FC (loan)	19	(0)
2018	→ FC Anyang (loan)	31	(0)
2019	→ Suwon FC (loan)	20	(0)
2020	→ Bucheon FC 1995 (loan)	21	(2)
2021–2023	Gyeongnam FC	57	(1)
2024–	FC Anyang	63	(1)

International career
- South Korea U-17
2011–2013	South Korea U-20		
- * Club domestic league appearances and goals as of 3 August 2026

Kim Young-chan (Korean: 김영찬; Hanja: 金英讚; born 4 September 1993) is a South Korean footballer who plays as centre back for FC Anyang in K League 1.

== Career ==
Kim was selected by Jeonbuk Hyundai in the 2013 K League draft.

He moved to Daegu FC on loan on 9 July but made only 6 appearances in Daegu.

On 21 January 2014, Suwon FC confirmed a loan signing of Kim.

== Personal life ==
On 11 December 2021, Kim married Lee Ye Rim, the daughter of actor and comedian Lee Kyung Kyu.
