= Mahmood Al-Mushaifri =

Omani footballer (born 1993)

Personal information
- Full name: Mahmood Mabrook Nasib Al-Mushaifri
- Date of birth: 14 January 1993 (age 33)
- Place of birth: Rustaq, Oman
- Height: 1.75 m (5 ft 9 in)
- Position: Defender

Team information
- Current team: Al-Nasr

Senior career*
Years	Team	Apps	(Gls)
2014–2016	Suwaiq		
2018–	Al-Nasr		

International career^{‡}
2014	Oman U23	3	(0)
2016–	Oman	32	(0)
- * Club domestic league appearances and goals ‡ National team caps and goals as of 12 September 2023

Mahmood Mabrook Nasib Al-Mushaifri (Arabic: محمود مبروك نسيب; born 14 January 1993), commonly known as Mahmood Al-Mushaifri, is an Omani footballer who plays for Al-Nasr in Oman Professional League and the Oman national football team as a defender.

== Career ==
=== Club ===
He won the Oman Professional League in 2017–18 with Suwaiq Club.

=== International ===
Al-Mushaifri made his debut for Oman national football team in a friendly match on 8 August 2016 against Turkmenistan. He was included in Oman's squad for the 2019 AFC Asian Cup in the United Arab Emirates.

== Career statistics ==
=== International ===
Statistics accurate as of match played 30 December 2018

Oman national team
Year	Apps	Goals
2016	3	0
2017	3	0
2018	11	0
Total	17	0
