= Wang Chun =

Taiwanese police officer

Wang Chun (Chinese: 王郡) is a Taiwanese police officer.

Wang has led the seventh police peace preservation corps, the National Police Agency's Criminal Investigation Bureau, and the Kaohsiung City Police Department before his appointment as deputy director-general of the National Police Agency. Wang was considered a potential Kuomintang candidate in the October 1999 by-elections for Yunlin County magistrate. He refused the nomination, which instead went to Chang Cheng-hsiung.

In April 2000, the incoming Chen Shui-bian presidential administration announced that Wang had been named minister of the Coast Guard Administration. Shortly after taking office, Wang announced plans for the coast guard to expand its surveillance capacity. In December 2000, Wang accompanied Chen on the latter's first visit to Pratas Island. On the second anniversary of the CGA's founding in 2002, Wang again stressed the need for equipment upgrades. Wang subsequently explored the leasing of equipment from private companies. In December 2003, Wang was appointed the leader of the Hunting Snake task force, a government initiative against illegal immigration. In May 2004, Shi Hwei-yow replaced Wang at the Coast Guard Administration.
