= Saoud Al-Khalaqi =

Qatari footballer (born 1993)

Personal information
- Full name: Saoud Mohammed Al-Khalaqi
- Date of birth: 5 August 1993 (age 33)
- Place of birth: Qatar
- Height: 1.77 m (5 ft 9 1/2 in)
- Position: Striker

Senior career*
Years	Team	Apps	(Gls)
2013–2015	Al-Gharafa		
2015–2017	Al Ahli		
2017	→ Al-Shahania (loan)		
2017–2018	Al-Khor		
2018–2019	Al-Shahania		
- * Club domestic league appearances and goals

Saoud Al-Khalaqi (Arabic: سعود الخلاقي) (born 5 August 1993) is a Qatari footballer.
