= Sky Hall Toyota =

Arena in Toyota, Aichi, Japan

Coordinates: 35°4′54.25″N 137°9′46.7″E

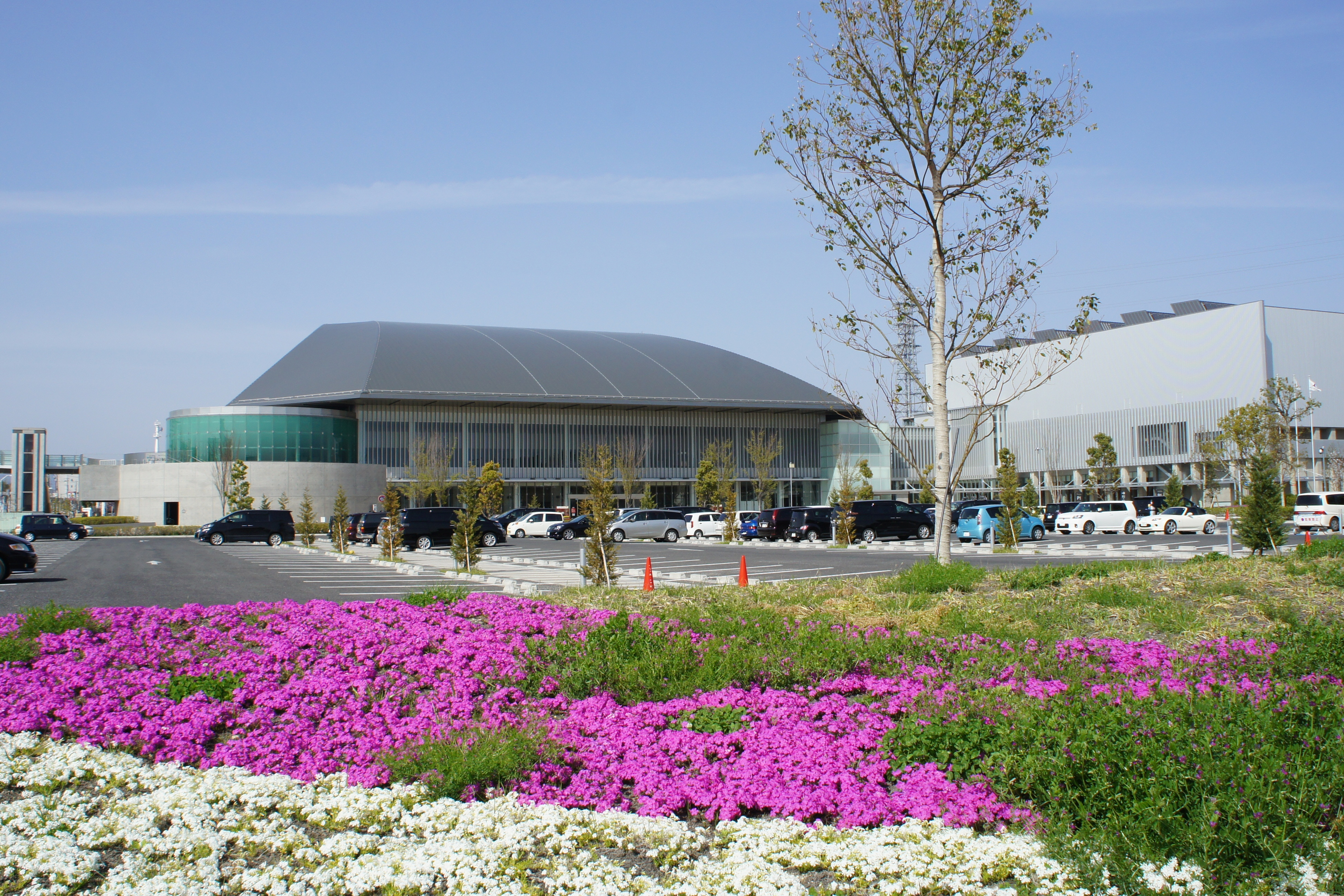
- Interactive map of Sky Hall Toyota
- Full name: Toyota City General Gymnasium
- Location: Toyota, Aichi, Japan
- Owner: Toyota city
- Operator: Toyota city Sports Association
- Capacity: Main: 6,500

Construction
- Opened: March 2007
- Cost
- Architect: MHS
- Main contractor: Kajima

Tenant
- 2026 Asian Games

Website
- http://www.toyota-taikyo.or.jp/skyhall/hall.html

Sky Hall Toyota is an arena in Toyota, Aichi, Japan.

== Events ==
- 2007 Fed Cup
- Dunlop World Challenge
- 2025 Rally Japan

== Facilities ==
- Main Hall 3,600m^{2}
- Sub Hall 1,745m^{2}
- Budojo
- Studio
- Training room
- Climbing wall
- Running course
- Conference room

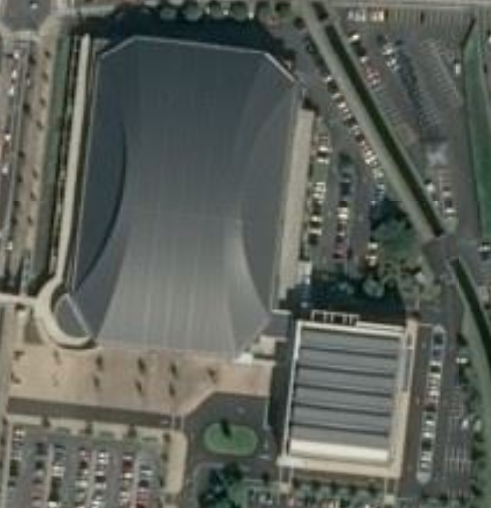
Satellite view
