= Shuto Minami =

Japanese footballer

Shuto Minami 南 秀仁
Personal information
- Full name: Shuto Minami
- Date of birth: 5 May 1993 (age 33)
- Place of birth: Sagamihara, Kanagawa, Japan
- Height: 1.77 m (5 ft 9 1/2 in)
- Position: Forward

Team information
- Current team: Montedio Yamagata
- Number: 18

Youth career
- –2005: Minamiono SSS
- 2006–2008: Verdy SS Sagamihara
- 2009–2011: Tokyo Verdy

Senior career*
Years	Team	Apps	(Gls)
2010–2016	Tokyo Verdy	89	(13)
2013	→ Machida Zelvia (loan)	3	(1)
2017–	Montedio Yamagata	233	(10)
- * Club domestic league appearances and goals as of 1 January 2026

Shuto Minami (南 秀仁, born 5 May 1993) is a Japanese footballer who plays as a forward for Montedio Yamagata.

== Career statistics ==
=== Club ===
Updated to 26 July 2022.

Appearances and goals by club, season and competition
Club	Season	League			Emperor's Cup		Other		Total	
Club	Season	Division	Apps	Goals	Apps	Goals	Apps	Goals	Apps	Goals
Tokyo Verdy	2010	J2 League	2	1	–		–		2	1
Tokyo Verdy	2011	J2 League	0	0	0	0	–		0	0
Tokyo Verdy	2012	J2 League	4	0	0	0	–		4	0
Tokyo Verdy	2013	J2 League	2	0	0	0	–		2	0
Tokyo Verdy	2014	J2 League	23	2	1	0	–		24	2
Tokyo Verdy	2015	J2 League	41	10	0	0	–		41	10
Tokyo Verdy	2016	J2 League	17	0	3	0	–		20	0
Tokyo Verdy	Total		89	13	4	0	0	0	93	13
Machida Zelvia	2013	JFL	3	1	–		–		3	1
Montedio Yamagata	2017	J2 League	2	0	0	0	–		2	0
Montedio Yamagata	2018	J2 League	29	3	2	0	–		31	3
Montedio Yamagata	2019	J2 League	24	2	1	0	1	0	26	2
Montedio Yamagata	2020	J2 League	37	2	–		–		37	2
Montedio Yamagata	2021	J2 League	40	1	0	0	–		40	1
Montedio Yamagata	2022	J2 League	14	0	0	0	–		14	0
Montedio Yamagata	Total		146	8	3	0	1	0	150	8
Career total			236	22	7	0	1	0	244	22
