= Mohammed Saleh =

Mohammed Saleh may refer to:

- Abu Muhammad Salih al-Majiri, Sufi leader from Morocco and one of the successors of Abu Madyan
- Mohammed Saleh (politician), Nigerian politician elected Senator for Kaduna Central on 9 April 2011
- Mohammed Saleh (Palestinian footballer), Palestinian footballer
- Mohammed Saleh Al Sada, minister of industry and energy of Qatar
- Mohammed Saleh Ahmed Al-Helali, Ambassador Extraordinary and Plenipotentiary of the Republic of Yemen to the Russian Federation
- Jasim Mohammed Saleh, Iraqi lBaathist who commanded the Iraqi Army under Saddam Hussein
- Osman Saleh Mohammed, first Minister of Education for Eritrea following independence
- Khaled Mohammed (Khaled Mohammed Saleh, born 2000), Qatari footballer
- Mohammed Abdullah Saleh, Yemeni major general
- Mohammed Yassin Saleh, transitional Minister of Culture of Syria
- Mohammad Saleh, Indonesian justice

== See also ==
- Saleh Mohammad (disambiguation)
