= Nguyễn Xuân Nam =

Vietnamese footballer

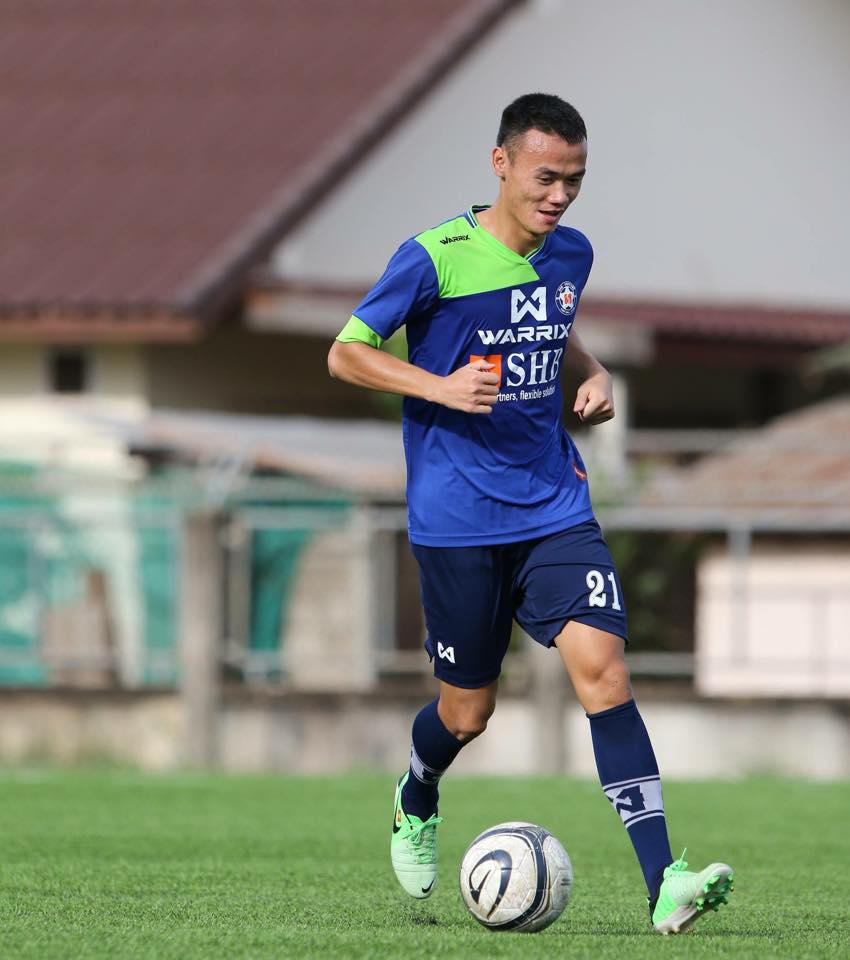
- Xuân Nam in 2015

Personal information
- Full name: Nguyễn Xuân Nam
- Date of birth: January 18, 1994 (age 32)
- Place of birth: Hải Dương, Vietnam
- Height: 1.78 m (5 ft 10 in)
- Position: Forward

Team information
- Current team: Hải Phòng
- Number: 15

Youth career
- 2005–2013: Hà Nội

Senior career*
Years	Team	Apps	(Gls)
2013–2018	Hà Nội	5	(0)
2015–2016	→ SHB Vientiane (loan)	13	(15)
2016–2017	→ Sài Gòn (loan)	29	(7)
2019	Phố Hiến	15	(14)
2020–2021	Hồ Chí Minh City	17	(4)
2021–2022	Topenland Bình Định	22	(8)
2023–2024	Công An Hà Nội	19	(1)
2024–2025	PVF-CAND	17	(5)
2025–	Hải Phòng	3	(0)

International career^{‡}
2010–2011	Vietnam U16	23	(1)
2011–2013	Vietnam U19	20	(8)
- * Club domestic league appearances and goals as of 27 August 2025 ‡ National team caps and goals as of 28 August 2015

Nguyễn Xuân Nam (born 18 January 1994) is a Vietnamese professional footballer who plays as a forward for V.League 1 club Hải Phòng.

He had previously played for Lao Premier League club SHB Vientiane and V.League 1 club Sài Gòn, both on loan from Hà Nội.

== International goals ==
=== U-16 ===
#	Date	Venue	Opponent	Score	Result	Competition
1.	27 October 2010	Tashkent, Pakhtakor Stadium	Australia	1–0	1-3	2010 AFC U-16 Championship

=== U-19 ===
#	Date	Venue	Opponent	Score	Result	Competition
1.	8 September 2011	Yangon, Thuwunna Stadium	Brunei	2-0	7–0	2011 AFF U-19 Youth Championship
2.	8 September 2011	Yangon, Thuwunna Stadium	Brunei	3-0	7–0	2011 AFF U-19 Youth Championship
3.	12 September 2011	Yangon, Aung San Stadium	Indonesia	2–0	6-1	2011 AFF U-19 Youth Championship
4.	16 September 2011	Yangon, Aung San Stadium	Laos	2-0	4–0	2011 AFF U-19 Youth Championship
5.	16 September 2011	Yangon, Aung San Stadium	Laos	3-0	4–0	2011 AFF U-19 Youth Championship
6.	19 September 2011	Yangon, Thuwunna Stadium	Malaysia	1-1	2-1	2011 AFF U-19 Youth Championship
7.	19 September 2011	Yangon, Thuwunna Stadium	Malaysia	2-1	2-1	2011 AFF U-19 Youth Championship
8.	21 September 2011	Yangon, Thuwunna Stadium	Thailand	1–1	1-1	2011 AFF U-19 Youth Championship

== Honours ==
Công An Hà Nội

- V.League 1: 2023

Individual

- AFF U-19 Youth Championship top scorer: 2011
- V.League 2 top scorer: 2019
