= Souliya Syphasay =

Laotian footballer

Souliya Syphasay (born 18 December 1993 in Vientiane) is a Laotian footballer who plays for his hometown club Ezra in Lao League as a defender. He is a member of the Laos national football team and played at the 2010 AFF Suzuki Cup and 2014 FIFA World Cup qualifiers.
