= Hồ Sỹ Sâm =

Vietnamese footballer (born 1993)

Personal information
- Full name: Hồ Sỹ Sâm
- Date of birth: 2 September 1993 (age 33)
- Place of birth: Quỳnh Lưu, Nghệ An, Vietnam
- Height: 1.71 m (5 ft 7 in)
- Position: Midfielder

Team information
- Current team: Hồng Lĩnh Hà Tĩnh
- Number: 23

Youth career
- 2010–2013: Sông Lam Nghệ An

Senior career*
Years	Team	Apps	(Gls)
2013–2023	Sông Lam Nghệ An	111	(1)
2023–	Hồng Lĩnh Hà Tĩnh	12	(0)

International career
2014–2015	Vietnam U23	3	(0)
- * Club domestic league appearances and goals as of 2 October 2018

Hồ Sỹ Sâm (born 2 September 1993) is a former Vietnamese footballer who plays as a midfielder for V.League 1 club Hồng Lĩnh Hà Tĩnh.

Sỹ Sâm is known for being a hardworking midfielder who played in his home town club before advancing to the V.League.
