= Phan Đình Thắng =

Vietnamese footballer

Personal information
- Full name: Phan Đình Thắng
- Date of birth: October 2, 1993 (age 33)
- Place of birth: Cửa Lò, Nghệ An, Vietnam
- Height: 1.70 m (5 ft 7 in)
- Position: Midfielder

Youth career
- 2006–2008: Hà Nội
- 2009–2011: Viettel

Senior career*
Years	Team	Apps	(Gls)
2011–2012	Hòa Phát Hà Nội	8	(0)
2012	Hà Nội	3	(0)
2013	Bình Định	11	(0)
2014	Viettel	14	(0)
2015–2020	Quảng Nam	120	(7)
2021–2022	Sông Lam Nghệ An	3	(0)
- * Club domestic league appearances and goals as of 15 July 2018

Phan Đình Thắng (born 2 October 1993) is a Vietnamese footballer who plays as a midfielder for V.League 1 club Sông Lam Nghệ An.

== Honours ==
=== Club ===
Quang Nam

- V.League 1: 2017
