= 2012 AFC U-19 Championship =

بطولة آسيا تحت 19 سنة لكرة القدم 2012

Tournament details
- Host country: United Arab Emirates
- Dates: 3–17 November
- Teams: 16 (from 1 confederation)
- Venues: 2 (in 2 host cities)

Final positions
- Champions: South Korea (12th title)
- Runners-up: Iraq

Tournament statistics
- Matches played: 31
- Goals scored: 93 (3 per match)
- Attendance: 39,997 (1,290 per match)
- Top scorer: (Uzbekistan) Igor Sergeev (7 goals)
- Best player: (Iraq) Mohannad Abdul-Raheem

The 2012 AFC U-19 Championship is the 37th edition of the tournament organized by the Asian Football Confederation. The AFC approved UAE as hosts of the 2012 AFC U-19 Championship on 23 November 2011. The top four teams will qualify directly to the 2013 FIFA U-20 World Cup hosted by Turkey.

== Hosts ==
The Organising Committee announced that Bangladesh, Iran, Palestine, United Arab Emirates, Uzbekistan had expressed an interest to host the finals.

The decision of the Committee, the member associations should qualify for the finals to be eligible to host the competition. The decision on the hosts was taken in the committee’s next meeting on 23 November 2011 based on the results of the qualifiers.

== Venues ==
| Cities | Venues | Capacity |
|---|---|---|
| Fujairah | Fujairah Club Stadium | 5,000 |
| Ras al-Khaimah | Emirates Club Stadium | 3,000 |

== Qualification ==
The qualification draw was held on 30 March 2011.

=== Qualifiers ===
- Australia
- China
- Iran
- Iraq
- Japan
- Jordan
- North Korea
- South Korea
- Kuwait
- Qatar
- Saudi Arabia
- Syria
- Thailand
- United Arab Emirates
- Uzbekistan
- Vietnam

== Draw ==
The draw for the Final tournament was held on 13 May 2012 in Dubai, United Arab Emirates.

| Pot 1 (host & seeds) | Pot 2 | Pot 3 | Pot 4 |
|---|---|---|---|
| United Arab Emirates; North Korea; Australia; South Korea | Saudi Arabia; Japan; Uzbekistan; China | Syria; Iran; Vietnam; Thailand | Jordan; Iraq; Qatar; Kuwait |

== Group stage ==
All times are UTC+04:00.

=== Group A ===
| Pos | Team | Pld | W | D | L | GF | GA | GD | Pts | Qualification |
|---|---|---|---|---|---|---|---|---|---|---|
| 1 | Iran | 3 | 2 | 1 | 0 | 9 | 1 | +8 | 7 | Knockout stage |
| 2 | Japan | 3 | 1 | 1 | 1 | 1 | 2 | −1 | 4 | Knockout stage |
| 3 | United Arab Emirates (H) | 3 | 0 | 3 | 0 | 2 | 2 | 0 | 3 | |
| 4 | Kuwait | 3 | 0 | 1 | 2 | 1 | 8 | −7 | 1 | |

Source: AFC
Rules for classification: Group stage tiebreakers
(H) Hosts
3 November 2012
17:00

| United Arab Emirates | 1–1 | Kuwait |
|---|---|---|
| Rashid 34' | Report | Al-Fahad 46' |

Emirates Club Stadium, Ras al-Khaimah
Attendance: 2,158
Referee: Banjar Al-Dosari (Qatar)
3 November 2012
21:00

| Japan | 0–2 | Iran |
|---|---|---|
| | Report | Barzay 2'; Fazeli 56' |

Emirates Club Stadium, Ras al-Khaimah
Attendance: 341
Referee: Malik Abdul Bashir (Singapore)

5 November 2012
17:00

| Kuwait | 0–1 | Japan |
|---|---|---|
| | Report | Iwanami 45+2' |

Emirates Club Stadium, Ras al-Khaimah
Attendance: 215
Referee: Ali Sabbagh (Lebanon)
5 November 2012
21:00

| Iran | 1–1 | United Arab Emirates |
|---|---|---|
| Jahanbakhsh 69' | Report | Saeed 83' |

Emirates Club Stadium, Ras al-Khaimah
Attendance: 3,750
Referee: Liu Kwok Man (Hong Kong)

7 November 2012
21:00

| United Arab Emirates | 0–0 | Japan |
|---|---|---|
| | Report |

Emirates Club Stadium, Ras al-Khaimah
Attendance: 5,700
Referee: Peter Green (Australia)
7 November 2012
21:00

| Iran | 6–0 | Kuwait |
|---|---|---|
| Mashaeizadeh 28'; Pahlavan 53'; Azmoun 58'; Fazeli 65', 78'; Cheshmi 75' | Report |

Fujairah Club Stadium, Fujairah
Attendance: 1,200
Referee: Kim Dong-Jin (Korea Republic)

=== Group B ===
| Team | Pld | W | D | L | GF | GA | GD | Pts |
|---|---|---|---|---|---|---|---|---|
| Iraq | 3 | 2 | 1 | 0 | 5 | 1 | +4 | 7 |
| South Korea | 3 | 2 | 1 | 0 | 3 | 1 | +2 | 7 |
| Thailand | 3 | 1 | 0 | 2 | 3 | 6 | –3 | 3 |
| China | 3 | 0 | 0 | 3 | 2 | 5 | −3 | 0 |

3 November 2012
15:00

| South Korea | 0–0 | Iraq |
|---|---|---|
| | Report |

Fujairah Club Stadium, Fujairah
Attendance: 300
Referee: Ravshan Irmatov (Uzbekistan)

3 November 2012
19:00

| China | 1–2 | Thailand |
|---|---|---|
| Feng Gang 90+1' | Report | Notechaiya 84'; Thongkruea 87' |

Fujairah Club Stadium, Fujairah
Attendance: 500
Referee: Yousef Al-Marzouq (Kuwait)

5 November 2012
15:00

| Iraq | 2–1 | China |
|---|---|---|
| Abdul-Raheem 43', 62' | Report | Wu Xinghan 38' |

Fujairah Club Stadium, Fujairah
Attendance: 350
Referee: Abdullah Al Hilali (Oman)

5 November 2012
19:00

| Thailand | 1–2 | South Korea |
|---|---|---|
| Puangchan 64' | Report | Heo Yong-joon 22'; Kim Seung-jun 72' |

Fujairah Club Stadium, Fujairah
Attendance: 800
Referee: Alireza Faghani (Iran)

7 November 2012
17:00

| South Korea | 1–0 | China |
|---|---|---|
| Moon Chang-Jin 80' | Report |

Emirates Club Stadium, Ras al-Khaimah
Attendance: 150
Referee: Malik Abdul Bashir (Singapore)

7 November 2012
17:00

| Thailand | 0–3 | Iraq |
|---|---|---|
| | Report | Hattab 11' (pen.); Shokan 49'; Abdul-Raheem 52' |

Fujairah Club Stadium, Fujairah
Attendance: 350
Referee: Banjar Al-Dosari (Qatar)

=== Group C ===
| Team | Pld | W | D | L | GF | GA | GD | Pts |
|---|---|---|---|---|---|---|---|---|
| Uzbekistan | 3 | 2 | 1 | 0 | 8 | 2 | +6 | 7 |
| Jordan | 3 | 1 | 2 | 0 | 8 | 5 | +3 | 5 |
| North Korea | 3 | 1 | 1 | 1 | 6 | 3 | +3 | 4 |
| Vietnam | 3 | 0 | 0 | 3 | 2 | 14 | −12 | 0 |

4 November 2012
17:00

| North Korea | 1–1 | Jordan |
|---|---|---|
| Ri Ji-Song 76' | Report | Qwaider 90' |

Emirates Club Stadium, Ras al-Khaimah
Attendance: 330
Referee: Peter Green (Australia)
4 November 2012
21:00

| Uzbekistan | 4–0 | Vietnam |
|---|---|---|
| Fomin 28'; Sergeev 45+1', 79'; Khakimov 90+1' | Report |

Emirates Club Stadium, Ras al-Khaimah
Attendance: 152
Referee: Minoru Tojo (Japan)

6 November 2012
17:00

| Jordan | 2–2 | Uzbekistan |
|---|---|---|
| Fadi Awad 49'; Rakhmanov 65' (o.g.) | Report | Sergeev 60' (pen.) 90+3' |

Emirates Club Stadium, Ras al-Khaimah
Attendance: 255
Referee: Mohamed Al Zarouni (UAE)
6 November 2012
21:00

| Vietnam | 0–5 | North Korea |
|---|---|---|
| | Report | Kang Nam-Gwon 3'; Pak Myong-Song 22'; Jong Kwang-Sok 62'; Jang Kuk-Chol 75'; Kim Ju-Song 82' |

Emirates Club Stadium, Ras al-Khaimah
Attendance: 1,250
Referee: Yousef Al-Marzouq (Kuwait)

8 November 2012
21:00

| North Korea | 0–2 | Uzbekistan |
|---|---|---|
| | Report | Sergeev 79' (pen.); Khakimov 85' |

Emirates Club Stadium, Ras al-Khaimah
Attendance: 175
Referee: Ali Sabbagh (Lebanon)
8 November 2012
21:00

| Vietnam | 2–5 | Jordan |
|---|---|---|
| Nguyễn Xuân Nam 54'; Nguyễn Thanh Hiền 85' (pen.) | Report | Qwaider 52', 87'; Al-Bashtawi 64'; Rateb 73'; Al-Essawi 90+1' |

Fujairah Club Stadium, Fujairah
Attendance: 1,200
Referee: Abdullah Al Hilali (Oman)

=== Group D ===
| Team | Pld | W | D | L | GF | GA | GD | Pts |
|---|---|---|---|---|---|---|---|---|
| Australia | 3 | 1 | 2 | 0 | 3 | 2 | +1 | 5 |
| Syria | 3 | 1 | 1 | 1 | 7 | 4 | +3 | 4 |
| Saudi Arabia | 3 | 1 | 1 | 1 | 6 | 8 | −2 | 4 |
| Qatar | 3 | 1 | 0 | 2 | 4 | 6 | −2 | 3 |

4 November 2012
15:00

| Australia | 1–0 | Qatar |
|---|---|---|
| Gameiro 11' | Report |

Fujairah Club Stadium, Fujairah
Attendance: 500
Referee: Kim Dong-Jin (Korea Republic)

4 November 2012
19:00

| Saudi Arabia | 1–5 | Syria |
|---|---|---|
| A. Al-Shehri 30' | Report | Maowas 8', 14', 69'; Al-Taki 10'; Salem 86' |

Fujairah Club Stadium, Fujairah
Attendance: 900
Referee: Mohamed Al Zarouni (UAE)

6 November 2012
15:00

| Qatar | 2–4 | Saudi Arabia |
|---|---|---|
| Mohamed 20'; Al Yazidi 71' | Report | S. Al-Shehri 8'; Al-Muwallad 16', 56'; A. Al-Shehri 34' |

Fujairah Club Stadium, Fujairah
Attendance: 500
Referee: Minoru Tojo (Japan)

6 November 2012
19:00

| Syria | 1–1 | Australia |
|---|---|---|
| Maowas 74' | Report | Gameiro 81' |

Fujairah Club Stadium, Fujairah
Attendance: 1,200
Referee: Ravshan Irmatov (Uzbekistan)

8 November 2012
17:00

| Australia | 1–1 | Saudi Arabia |
|---|---|---|
| Gameiro 90+1' | Report | Al-Muwallad 57' |

Emirates Club Stadium, Ras al-Khaimah
Attendance: 170
Referee: Liu Kwok Man (Hong Kong)

8 November 2012
17:00

| Syria | 1–2 | Qatar |
|---|---|---|
| Maowas 68' (pen.) | Report | Alaaeldin 44', 49' |

Fujairah Club Stadium, Fujairah
Attendance: 4,500
Referee: Alireza Faghani (Iran)

== Knockout stage ==
=== Knockout map ===
Quarter-finals
11 November – Ras al-Khaimah
Iran | 1
South Korea | 4
11 November – Fujairah
Uzbekistan (p.) | 2 (3)
Syria | 2 (0)
11 November – Ras al-Khaimah
Iraq | 2
Japan | 1
11 November – Fujairah
Australia | 3
Jordan | 0

Semi-finals
14 November – Ras al-Khaimah
South Korea | 3
Uzbekistan | 1
14 November – Ras al-Khaimah
Iraq | 2
Australia | 0

Final
17 November – Ras al-Khaimah
South Korea (p.) | 1 (4)
Iraq | 1 (1)

=== Quarter-finals ===
Winners qualified for 2013 FIFA U-20 World Cup.

11 November 2012
15:00

| Uzbekistan | 2–2 | Syria |
|---|---|---|
| Sergeev 44'; Tashpulatov 76' | Report | Mido 38'; Al-Mawas 45+2' (pen.) |
Penalties
| Kozak (penalty scored); Sabirkhodjaev (penalty scored); Khakimov (penalty scored) | 3–0 | (penalty missed) Al Kaddour; (penalty missed) Mobayed; (penalty missed) Al-Mawas |

Fujairah Club Stadium, Fujairah
Attendance: 2,000
Referee: Malik Abdul Bashir (Singapore)

11 November 2012
17:00

| Iran | 1–4 | South Korea |
|---|---|---|
| Jahanbakhsh 29' | Report | Moon Chang-Jin 2'; Lee Gwang-Hoon 49'; Kim Seung-jun 81'; Kwon Chang-Hoon 90+5' |

Emirates Club Stadium, Ras al-Khaimah
Attendance: 387
Referee: Minoru Tojo (Japan)

11 November 2012
19:00

| Australia | 3–0 | Jordan |
|---|---|---|
| Gameiro 10', 55', 83' | Report |

Fujairah Club Stadium, Fujairah
Attendance: 2,500
Referee: Alireza Faghani (Iran)

11 November 2012
21:00

| Iraq | 2–1 | Japan |
|---|---|---|
| Shokan 34'; Adnan 53' | Report | Yajima 48' |

Emirates Club Stadium, Ras al-Khaimah
Attendance: 814
Referee: Ravshan Irmatov (Uzbekistan)

=== Semi-finals ===
14 November 2012
16:00

| South Korea | 3–1 | Uzbekistan |
|---|---|---|
| Kang Sang-Woo 51', 76'; Moon Chang-Jin 61' (pen.) | Report | Sergeev 66' |

Emirates Club Stadium, Ras al-Khaimah
Attendance: 250
Referee: Banjar Al-Dosari (Qatar)

14 November 2012
20:00

| Iraq | 2–0 | Australia |
|---|---|---|
| Abdul-Raheem 60'; Kadhim 85' | Report |

Emirates Club Stadium, Ras al-Khaimah
Attendance: 1,350
Referee: Liu Kwok Man (Hong Kong)

=== Final ===
17 November 2012
16:45

| South Korea | 1–1 | Iraq |
|---|---|---|
| Moon Chang-Jin 90+2' | Report | Abdul-Raheem 35' |
Penalties
| Kim Sun-Woo (penalty scored); Ryu Seung-Woo (penalty scored); Sim Sang-min (penalty scored); Woo Joo-Sung (penalty scored) | 4–1 | (penalty scored) Hattab; (penalty missed) Abdul-Raheem; (penalty missed) Saif |

Emirates Club Stadium, Ras al-Khaimah
Attendance: 5,750
Referee: Mohamed Al Zarouni (UAE)

== Winners ==
2012 AFC U-19 Championship winners

South Korea
12th title

== Goalscorers ==
There were 93 goals scored in 31 matches, for an average of 3 goals per match.

7 goals

- (Uzbekistan) Igor Sergeev

6 goals

- (Australia) Corey Gameiro
- (Syria) Mahmoud Maowas

5 goals

- (Iraq) Mohannad Abdul-Raheem

4 goals

- (South Korea) Moon Chang-Jin

3 goals

- (Iran) Hossein Fazeli
- (Jordan) Bilal Qwaider
- (Saudi Arabia) Fahad Al-Muwallad

2 goals

- (Iran) Alireza Jahanbakhsh
- (Iraq) Mohammed Jabbar Shokan
- (South Korea) Kang Sang-Woo
- (South Korea) Kim Seung-jun
- (Qatar) Ahmed Alaaeldin
- (Saudi Arabia) Ahmed Al-Shehri
- (Uzbekistan) Timur Khakimov

1 goal

- (China) Feng Gang
- (China) Wu Xinghan
- (Iran) Sardar Azmoun
- (Iran) Behnam Barzay
- (Iran) Rouzbeh Cheshmi
- (Iran) Valid Mashaeizadeh
- (Iran) Ehsan Pahlavan
- (Iraq) Jawad Kadhim
- (Iraq) Ahmad Abbas
- (Iraq) Ali Adnan
- (Japan) Takuya Iwanami
- (Japan) Shinya Yajima
- (Jordan) Laith Al-Bashtawi
- (Jordan) Ahmed Al-Issawi
- (Jordan) Fadi Awad
- (Jordan) Saleh Rateb
- (North Korea) Jang Kuk-Chol
- (North Korea) Jong Kwang-Sok
- (North Korea) Kang Nam-Gwon
- (North Korea) Kim Ju-Song
- (North Korea) Pak Myong-Song
- (North Korea) Ri Ji-Song
- (South Korea) Heo Yong-joon
- (South Korea) Kwon Chang-Hoon
- (South Korea) Lee Gwang-Hoon
- (Kuwait) Mohammad Al-Fahad
- (Qatar) Saleh Bader Al Yazidi
- (Qatar) Musaab Khidir Mohamed
- (Saudi Arabia) Saleh Al-Shehri
- (Syria) Adnan Al-Taki
- (Syria) Hamid Mido
- (Syria) Samer Salem
- (Vietnam) Nguyễn Thanh Hiền
- (Vietnam) Nguyễn Xuân Nam
- (Thailand) Perapat Notchaiya
- (Thailand) Thitipan Puangchan
- (Thailand) Woranat Thongkruea
- (United Arab Emirates) Saif Rashid
- (United Arab Emirates) Yousif Saeed
- (Uzbekistan) Maksimilian Fomin
- (Uzbekistan) Ihtiyor Tashpulatov

1 own goal

- (Uzbekistan) Sardor Rakhmanov (against Jordan)

== Awards ==
- Top scorer: (Uzbekistan) Igor Sergeev
- MVP: (Iraq) Mohannad Abdul-Raheem
- Best Goalkeeper: (Iraq) Mohammed Hameed
- Fair play team: Iraq

== Countries to participate in 2013 FIFA U-20 World Cup ==
Top 4 teams qualified for 2013 FIFA U-20 World Cup.

- Australia
- Iraq
- South Korea
- Uzbekistan
