= 2010 AFC U-16 Championship squads =

The 2010 AFC U-16 Championship was an international under-16 age group football tournament held in Uzbekistan from 24 October until 7 November 2010. The sixteen national teams involved in the tournament were required to register a squad of maximum 23 players; only players in these squads were eligible to take part in the tournament.

The age listed for each player is on 24 October 2010, the first day of the tournament. The nationality for each club reflects the national association (not the league) to which the club is affiliated. A flag is included for coaches that are of a different nationality than their own national team. Players in boldface have been capped at full international level at some point in their career.

== Group A ==
=== Uzbekistan ===
Head coach: Aleksey Evstafeev

The final squad was announced on 20 October 2010.

No.	Pos.	Player	Date of birth (age)	Club
1	GK	Sergey Smorodin	15 February 1994 (aged 16)	(Uzbekistan Football Association) Pakhtakor Tashkent FK
2	MF	Bobur Iskandarov	2 July 1994 (aged 16)	(Uzbekistan Football Association) RCOR Tashkent
3	DF	Sardor Rakhmanov	9 July 1994 (aged 16)	(Uzbekistan Football Association) FK Mash'al Mubarek
4	DF	Ravshanjon Haydarov	1 June 1994 (aged 16)	(Uzbekistan Football Association) RCOR Tashkent
5	DF	Asil Mansurov	4 August 1994 (aged 16)	(Uzbekistan Football Association) FMI Yangier
6	MF	Abbos Makhsataliev	12 January 1994 (aged 16)	(Uzbekistan Football Association) Pakhtakor Tashkent FK
7	MF	Azizbek Muratov	21 January 1994 (aged 16)	(Uzbekistan Football Association) FK Buxoro
8	MF	**Sardor Sabirkhodjaev**	6 November 1994 (aged 15)	(Uzbekistan Football Association) Pakhtakor Tashkent FK
9	MF	Hayrullo Jakbarov	6 January 1994 (aged 16)	(Uzbekistan Football Association) RCOR Tashkent
10	FW	Nodirkhon Kamolov	22 October 1994 (aged 16)	(Uzbekistan Football Association) RCOR Tashkent
11	FW	Timur Khakimov	23 August 1994 (aged 16)	(Uzbekistan Football Association) Pakhtakor Tashkent FK
12	GK	Ganisher Kholmurodov	29 November 1994 (aged 15)	(Uzbekistan Football Association) FK Mash'al Mubarek
13	MF	Bobir Davlatov	1 March 1996 (aged 14)	(Uzbekistan Football Association) FK Mash'al Mubarek
14	DF	Javlon Mirabdullaev	19 March 1994 (aged 16)	(Uzbekistan Football Association) FC Bunyodkor
15	FW	Jasurbek Khakimov	24 May 1994 (aged 16)	(Uzbekistan Football Association) RCOR Tashkent
17	MF	Dior Usmankhodjaev	7 February 1994 (aged 16)	(Uzbekistan Football Association) RCOR Tashkent
19	FW	**Zabikhillo Urinboev**	30 March 1995 (aged 15)	(Uzbekistan Football Association) FC Bunyodkor
20	MF	Muhammad Abdullaev	23 November 1994 (aged 15)	(Uzbekistan Football Association) FK Mash'al Mubarek
21	GK	Nodir Ashurmatov	1 July 1994 (aged 16)	(Uzbekistan Football Association) RCOR Tashkent
22	DF	Behruz Begmatov	9 May 1994 (aged 16)	(Uzbekistan Football Association) DYUSSH-16
23	DF	Azamat Abdullaev	23 February 1994 (aged 16)	(Uzbekistan Football Association) RCOR Tashkent
24	FW	Vladislav Pavlovskiy		(Uzbekistan Football Association) Pakhtakor Tashkent FK
34	DF	Yunus Ochildiev	29 March 1994 (aged 16)	(Uzbekistan Football Association) FK Mash'al Mubarek

=== Tajikistan ===
Head coach: Zoir Babaev

No.	Pos.	Player	Date of birth (age)	Club
1	GK	Bahodur Shamsov		(Tajikistan Football Federation) Ravshan
2	DF	Dilshodzhon Karimov	9 February 1994 (aged 16)	(Tajikistan Football Federation) Khujand
3	FW	Temurjon Odilov		(Tajikistan Football Federation) RSHVSM
5	DF	Anushervon Zagurov		(Tajikistan Football Federation) Gvardiya
6	MF	Dilshod Kholiqov		(Tajikistan Football Federation) Energetik
7	MF	Abdullo Saidov	25 January 1994 (aged 16)	(Tajikistan Football Federation) Istiklol
8	MF	Dilshod Salomov	5 October 1995 (aged 15)	(Tajikistan Football Federation) Istiklol
9	FW	Buzurgmekhr Kodirov		(Tajikistan Football Federation) RSHVSM
10	MF	Dilshod Rasulov		(Tajikistan Football Federation) Istiklol
11	FW	Dadakhon Muminov	19 April 1995 (aged 15)	(Moldovan Football Federation) Sheriff 95
12	MF	**Oybek Abdugafforov**	30 March 1995 (aged 15)	(Tajikistan Football Federation) Energetik
13	FW	Ibrohimi Muhtojzoda		(Tajikistan Football Federation) Saroykamar Panj
14	FW	Tolibjon Sultonov		(Tajikistan Football Federation) Istiklol
16	GK	Sulaymon Mirzomurodov	31 May 1994 (aged 16)	(Tajikistan Football Federation) Vakhsh
17	FW	Firdavsii Yusufzoda		(Tajikistan Football Federation) Istiklol
19	DF	Shabon Rahmatzoda		(Tajikistan Football Federation) Istiklol
21	FW	Komron Rajabalizoda		(Tajikistan Football Federation) RSHVSM
26	MF	Kholmurod Nazarov		(Tajikistan Football Federation) Danghara

=== Jordan ===
Head coach: (England) Jonathan Hill

The final squad was announced on 19 October 2010.

No.	Pos.	Player	Date of birth (age)	Club
1	GK	Ahmad Khanjar	24 September 1994 (aged 16)	(Jordan Football Association) Al-Jazeera
2	DF	**Omar Al-Manasrah**	15 February 1994 (aged 16)	(Jordan Football Association) Al-Jazeera
3	DF	Basil Abuhelweh		(Jordan Football Association)
5	MF	**Saleh Rateb**	18 December 1994 (aged 15)	(Jordan Football Association) Al-Wehdat
7	FW	Laith Al-Bashtawi	12 March 1994 (aged 16)	(Jordan Football Association) Al-Wehdat
8	FW	Hussein Obaidat	5 February 1994 (aged 16)	(Jordan Football Association)
9	FW	Tamer Soubar	19 February 1994 (aged 16)	(Jordan Football Association) Al-Ahli
10	MF	**Ahmad Sariweh**	23 January 1994 (aged 16)	(Jordan Football Association) Al-Wehdat
11	MF	Yaldar Sober		(Jordan Football Association)
12	GK	Mohammad Abu Nabhan	1 July 1994 (aged 16)	(Jordan Football Association) Al-Wehdat
13	DF	Ahmad Ghonaimat		(Jordan Football Association)
14	FW	Abdelrahman Ghaith		(Jordan Football Association)
15	DF	Yazan Nimer		(Jordan Football Association)
16	MF	**Samir Raja**	3 September 1994 (aged 16)	(Jordan Football Association) Al-Wehdat
17	MF	Omar Dweik	6 January 1994 (aged 16)	(Jordan Football Association) Al-Jazeera
18	MF	Omar Al-Hasani	4 February 1994 (aged 16)	(Jordan Football Association) Al-Jazeera
19	DF	Shamel Dahshan		(Jordan Football Association)
22	GK	Rabi Izzeldeen	8 August 1994 (aged 16)	(Jordan Football Association) Al-Faisaly
23	MF	**Ihsan Haddad**	5 February 1994 (aged 16)	(Jordan Football Association) Al-Arabi
24	DF	Majd Ananzeh	2 March 1994 (aged 16)	(Jordan Football Association)
27	DF	Ahmad Farajallah		(Jordan Football Association)
28	DF	Salah Mustafa		(Jordan Football Association)
32	DF	Husam Abu Sadah	15 February 1994 (aged 16)	(Jordan Football Association) Al-Ahli

=== Indonesia ===
Head coach: Mundari Karya

No.	Pos.	Player	Date of birth (age)	Club
1	GK	Nursanjaya		(Football Association of Indonesia) PPLP Sumut
2	DF	Hendriko Kiko Masko Kiwak		(Football Association of Indonesia) PPLP Papua
3	DF	Abdul Mutolib		(Football Association of Indonesia) Perseba Bangkalan
4	MF	Haniel Pagawak Nabu		(Football Association of Indonesia) Papua
5	DF	Wanda Syahputra	1 January 1994 (aged 16)	(Football Association of Indonesia) PPLP Sumut
6	DF	Arief Gangsar Patar	19 May 1994 (aged 16)	(Football Association of Indonesia) PS Urakan
7	MF	Ricky Alfian		(Football Association of Indonesia) PS Urakan
8	FW	Antony Nugroho	25 February 1994 (aged 16)	(Football Association of Indonesia) Persimuba
9	MF	Robin Bagus Febrian		(Football Association of Indonesia) Persida Sidoarjo
10	FW	Hadi Wibowo		(Football Association of Indonesia) Perseba Bangkalan
11	MF	Ricki Bardes	29 November 1994 (aged 15)	(Football Association of Indonesia) Persenal Tulehu
12	GK	Rizky Kurniawan	10 April 1994 (aged 16)	(Football Association of Indonesia) PS Urakan
13	MF	Reynaldi Alfiansyah		(Football Association of Indonesia) Perseba Bangkalan
14	DF	Purwa Putra	20 March 1994 (aged 16)	(Football Association of Indonesia) Perseba Bangkalan
15	DF	Yusup Purnomo		(Football Association of Indonesia) Perseba Bangkalan
17	MF	Maldini Pali	27 January 1995 (aged 15)	(Football Association of Indonesia) IFA
19	DF	Firmansyah Priyatna	29 January 1995 (aged 15)	(Football Association of Indonesia) Villa 2000 FC
20	FW	Angga Febryanto Putra	4 February 1995 (aged 15)	(Football Association of Indonesia) Persebaya Surabaya
22	DF	Dhomas Adhitya		(Football Association of Indonesia) Perseba Bangkalan
23	GK	Jupriyanto	28 April 1995 (aged 15)	(Football Association of Indonesia)
24	DF	Muhamad Toyib		(Football Association of Indonesia) Persida Sidoarjo
25	MF	Fakhri Rasyid		(Football Association of Indonesia) Perseba Bangkalan

== Group B ==
=== Iran ===
Head coach: Akbar Mohammadi

The final squad was announced on 18 October 2010.

No.	Pos.	Player	Date of birth (age)	Club
1	GK	Masoud Khanalizadeh		(Football Federation Islamic Republic of Iran) Paykan Tehran
2	DF	Fereidoon Zobeidani		(Football Federation Islamic Republic of Iran) Foolad
3	DF	Davoud Bahadori	14 January 1994 (aged 16)	(Football Federation Islamic Republic of Iran) Saba Qom
4	DF	Milad Kanani		(Football Federation Islamic Republic of Iran)
5	MF	Armin Naserinejad		(Football Federation Islamic Republic of Iran) Bargh Shiraz
6	MF	Mehdi Mehdipour	18 February 1994 (aged 16)	(Football Federation Islamic Republic of Iran) Zob Ahan
7	DF	Sasan Rajabzadeh		(Football Federation Islamic Republic of Iran) Zob Ahan
8	MF	Amir Hossein Karimi	9 February 1996 (aged 14)	(Football Federation Islamic Republic of Iran) Sepahan
9	FW	Ali Fathian	10 February 1995 (aged 15)	(Football Federation Islamic Republic of Iran) Bargh Shiraz
10	FW	**Sardar Azmoun**	1 January 1995 (aged 15)	(Football Federation Islamic Republic of Iran) Sepahan
11	DF	Maziar Nashtaei		(Football Federation Islamic Republic of Iran) Shamoushak Noshahr
12	GK	Meisam Labbaf		(Football Federation Islamic Republic of Iran)
13	MF	Bahman Jahantigh	14 March 1995 (aged 15)	(Football Federation Islamic Republic of Iran) Sepahan
14	FW	Siavash Hagh Nazari	3 August 1995 (aged 15)	(Football Federation Islamic Republic of Iran) Paykan Tehran
15	DF	Jalal Abdi	25 December 1994 (aged 15)	(Football Federation Islamic Republic of Iran) Tractor Sazi
16	DF	Mojtaba Balbakeh		(Football Federation Islamic Republic of Iran) Sepahan
19	FW	Azeim Moghaddam		(Football Federation Islamic Republic of Iran) Foolad
21	MF	Mohammadreza Hassani		(Football Federation Islamic Republic of Iran) Tractor Sazi
22	GK	Alireza Akbari	2 March 1994 (aged 16)	(Football Federation Islamic Republic of Iran) Malavan
23	DF	Mohammad Fahandej		(Football Federation Islamic Republic of Iran)
24	MF	Milad Sarlak	26 March 1995 (aged 15)	(Football Federation Islamic Republic of Iran) Sepahan
40	MF	**Saeid Aghaei**	9 February 1995 (aged 15)	(Football Federation Islamic Republic of Iran) Tractor Sazi
41	DF	Soroushpour Zohrab		(Football Federation Islamic Republic of Iran)

=== Syria ===
Head coach: Mohamad Joumaa

No.	Pos.	Player	Date of birth (age)	Club
1	GK	Ahmad Eyon Al Sod	15 July 1994 (aged 16)	(Syrian Football Association) Al-Karamah
4	DF	Malek Al Kadi		(Syrian Football Association) Nawair
5	DF	**Omar Midani**	26 January 1994 (aged 16)	(Syrian Football Association) Al-Wahda
6	DF	Housein Al Ali		(Syrian Football Association)
7	MF	Badruddin Shaker		(Syrian Football Association)
8	MF	Abd Al Manan Ibrahim		(Syrian Football Association)
9	MF	Abd Al Rahman Sabooh		(Syrian Football Association)
10	FW	Hussam Al Dien Omr		(Syrian Football Association) Al-Ittihad
11	MF	Ayhab Al Housni		(Syrian Football Association)
12	MF	Mohammad Al Ahmad	8 January 1994 (aged 16)	(Syrian Football Association) Al-Ittihad
13	DF	Ahmad Al Shemali	15 August 1994 (aged 16)	(Syrian Football Association) Al-Muhafaza
14	FW	Adnan Taki	1 February 1994 (aged 16)	(Syrian Football Association) Al-Jaish
15	DF	Shareef Al Sebaee		(Syrian Football Association)
16	MF	Abd Al Elah Hfean	20 January 1994 (aged 16)	(Syrian Football Association)
17	DF	Amer Haj Hashim		(Syrian Football Association) Al-Shorta
18	DF	Walat Hamadi		(Syrian Football Association)
20	DF	Jihad Al-Mostafa		(Syrian Football Association)
22	GK	Shaher Al Shakir	1 April 1994 (aged 16)	(Syrian Football Association) Al-Jaish
23	GK	Mehear Hageko		(Syrian Football Association)
27	DF	Wasim Nabhan	30 March 1994 (aged 16)	(Syrian Football Association)
29	FW	Ali Al-Ramadan	28 January 1994 (aged 16)	(Syrian Football Association) Al-Fotuwa
30	DF	**Omar Kharbin**	15 January 1994 (aged 16)	(Syrian Football Association) Al-Wahda
31	MF	Ahmed Al Salim		(Syrian Football Association)

=== North Korea ===
Head coach: Ri Song-ho

No.	Pos.	Player	Date of birth (age)	Club
1	GK	An Kang-chol	1 November 1994 (aged 15)	(DPR Korea Football Association) Amrokkang
2	MF	Jong Kwang-sok	5 January 1994 (aged 16)	(DPR Korea Football Association) Chobyong
3	DF	Choe Chol-ryong	29 January 1994 (aged 16)	(DPR Korea Football Association) Chobyong
4	DF	Kim Song-ho		(DPR Korea Football Association)
5	DF	Ro Myong-song	2 January 1995 (aged 15)	(DPR Korea Football Association) Rimyongsu
7	MF	Kang Nam-gwon	6 March 1995 (aged 15)	(DPR Korea Football Association) Chobyong
8	MF	**Ju Jong-chol**	20 October 1994 (aged 16)	(DPR Korea Football Association) Amrokkang
9	FW	**Jang Ok-chol**	14 January 1994 (aged 16)	(DPR Korea Football Association) Kigwancha
10	FW	Jo Kwang	5 August 1994 (aged 16)	(DPR Korea Football Association) Sobaeksu
11	FW	Ri Kwang-il		(DPR Korea Football Association)
12	DF	Kang Hyok		(DPR Korea Football Association)
13	DF	Jong Il-hyok	7 May 1994 (aged 16)	(DPR Korea Football Association) Chobyong
15	MF	Ri Ji-song	1 May 1994 (aged 16)	(DPR Korea Football Association) Chobyong
16	MF	**Pak Myong-song**	31 March 1994 (aged 16)	(DPR Korea Football Association) Sobaeksu
17	DF	**Kim Chol-bom**	16 July 1994 (aged 16)	(DPR Korea Football Association) Sobaeksu
18	MF	Kim Il-ok		
19	FW	Kang Su-yun	3 August 1994 (aged 16)	(DPR Korea Football Association) April 25
21	MF	Choe Myong-song	8 January 1994 (aged 16)	(DPR Korea Football Association) Chobyong
22	GK	Ri Son-chan	4 March 1994 (aged 16)	(DPR Korea Football Association) Chobyong
23	GK	Cha Jong-hun	19 April 1994 (aged 16)	(DPR Korea Football Association) Pyongyang City

=== Oman ===
Head coach: (Senegal) Boubacar Sarr

No.	Pos.	Player	Date of birth (age)	Club
1	GK	**Ahmed Al-Rawahi**	5 May 1994 (aged 16)	(Oman Football Association) Samail
3	DF	Marwan Jazira		(Oman Football Association)
4	DF	Khamis Al-Oraimi		(Oman Football Association) Saham
6	DF	Suhail Al-Balushi		(Oman Football Association)
7	MF	Hamed Al-Habsi	4 January 1994 (aged 16)	(Oman Football Association) Al-Nasr
8	FW	**Mohammed Al-Habsi**	14 May 1994 (aged 16)	(Oman Football Association) Muscat
9	MF	**Khalid Al-Hajri**	10 March 1994 (aged 16)	(Oman Football Association) Al-Mussanah
10	MF	Yaseen Al-Sheheimi		(Oman Football Association) Jalan
11	MF	Abdulrahman Al-Riyami		(Oman Football Association)
14	MF	Muneer Al-Bahlouli		(Oman Football Association)
15	FW	Khalid Al-Yahyaee		(Oman Football Association) Al-Mussanah
17	DF	**Nadhir Awadh**	5 December 1994 (aged 15)	(Oman Football Association) Dhofar
18	MF	Anas Al-Balushi		(Oman Football Association)
19	FW	Mohammed Al-Rawahi		(Oman Football Association)
20	MF	Nawaf Al-Rasbi		(Oman Football Association)
22	GK	Yasir Al-Hashmi		(Oman Football Association)
23	DF	Hassan Al-Saadi	22 February 1995 (aged 15)	(Oman Football Association) Al-Suwaiq
24	DF	Yasir Al-Mukhaini		(Oman Football Association)
26	GK	Mohammed Al-Jabri		(Oman Football Association)
27	DF	Abdullah Fadhah		(Oman Football Association)
33	FW	Omar Al-Balushi	8 April 1995 (aged 15)	(Oman Football Association)
42	FW	Ahmed Al-Ajmi		(Oman Football Association)
43	MF	Khalid Al-Mukhaini		(Oman Football Association)

== Group C ==
=== Japan ===
Head coach: Hirofumi Yoshitake

The final squad was announced on 19 October 2010.

No.	Pos.	Player	Date of birth (age)	Club
1	GK	Rikiya Iwawaki	19 March 1994 (aged 16)	(Japan Football Association) Júbilo Iwata
2	DF	Naoki Kawaguchi	24 May 1994 (aged 16)	(Japan Football Association) Albirex Niigata
3	DF	Takuya Iwanami	18 June 1994 (aged 16)	(Japan Football Association) Vissel Kobe
4	DF	Ryuga Suzuki	28 February 1994 (aged 16)	(Japan Football Association) Kashima Antlers
5	DF	**Naomichi Ueda**	24 October 1994 (aged 16)	(Japan Football Association) Ohzu High School
6	MF	Kazuki Fukai	11 March 1995 (aged 15)	(Japan Football Association) Consadole Sapporo
7	MF	Hiroki Akino	8 October 1994 (aged 16)	(Japan Football Association) Kashiwa Reysol
8	MF	Reo Mochizuki	18 January 1995 (aged 15)	(Japan Football Association) Yasu High School
9	FW	**Takumi Minamino**	16 January 1995 (aged 15)	(Japan Football Association) Cerezo Osaka
10	MF	Fumiya Hayakawa	12 January 1994 (aged 16)	(Japan Football Association) Albirex Niigata
11	FW	Yumemi Kanda	14 September 1994 (aged 16)	(Japan Football Association) Consadole Sapporo
12	DF	Yuto Horigome	9 September 1994 (aged 16)	(Japan Football Association) Consadole Sapporo
13	DF	Jumpei Arai	12 November 1994 (aged 15)	(Japan Football Association) Urawa Red Diamonds
14	FW	Masaya Matsumoto	25 January 1995 (aged 15)	(Japan Football Association) JFA Academy Fukushima
15	DF	Kyohei Yoshino	8 November 1994 (aged 15)	(Japan Football Association) Tokyo Verdy
17	FW	Hiroki Sugajima	11 May 1995 (aged 15)	(Japan Football Association) Tokyo Verdy
18	DF	Daisuke Takagi	14 October 1995 (aged 15)	(Japan Football Association) Tokyo Verdy
19	FW	Takuya Iwata	14 July 1994 (aged 16)	(Japan Football Association) FC Tokyo
20	MF	Keishi Kusumi	25 July 1994 (aged 16)	(Japan Football Association) Tokyo Verdy
21	GK	Genki Yamada	16 December 1994 (aged 15)	(Japan Football Association) Kyoto Sanga FC
22	MF	Hideki Ishige	21 September 1994 (aged 16)	(Japan Football Association) Shimizu S-Pulse
23	GK	**Kosuke Nakamura**	27 February 1995 (aged 15)	(Japan Football Association) Kashiwa Reysol
24	FW	Shuto Kitagawa	1 June 1995 (aged 15)	(Japan Football Association) Nagoya Grampus

=== Australia ===
Head coach: Gary van Egmond

The final squad was announced on 19 October 2010.

No.	Pos.	Player	Date of birth (age)	Club
1	GK	Paul Izzo	6 January 1995 (aged 15)	(Football Australia) Australia IS
2	DF	Jake Monaco	23 June 1994 (aged 16)	(Football Australia) Australia IS
3	DF	Connor Chapman	31 October 1994 (aged 15)	(Football Australia) Australia IS
4	DF	Hayden Morton	2 March 1994 (aged 16)	(Football Australia) New South Wales IS
5	DF	Corey Brown	7 January 1994 (aged 16)	(Football Australia) Australia IS
6	MF	Yianni Perkatis	8 March 1994 (aged 16)	(Football Australia) Australia IS
7	MF	Jacob Melling	4 April 1995 (aged 15)	(Football Australia) South Australia SI
8	MF	Kwabena Boahene	9 August 1994 (aged 16)	(Football Australia) Australia IS
9	FW	Jesse Makarounas	18 April 1994 (aged 16)	(Football Australia) Australia IS
10	FW	Anthony Proia	16 March 1994 (aged 16)	(Football Australia) Australia IS
11	FW	Brodie Paterson	13 July 1994 (aged 16)	(Football Australia) Australia IS
12	GK	Lachlan Tibbles	16 June 1994 (aged 16)	(Football Australia) Australia IS
13	MF	Giancarlo Gallifuoco	12 January 1994 (aged 16)	(Football Australia) Australia IS
14	DF	Nick Ansell	2 February 1994 (aged 16)	(Football Australia) Melbourne Victory FC
15	DF	Samuel Chapple		(Football Australia) New South Wales IS
16	MF	**Milos Degenek**	28 April 1994 (aged 16)	(Football Australia) Australia IS
18	GK	Daniel Sadaka	30 January 1994 (aged 16)	(Football Australia) Sutherland Sharks FC
19	MF	Luke Remington	12 May 1994 (aged 16)	(Football Australia) Northern New South Wales IS
21	MF	Abe Wheelhouse		(Football Australia) Northern New South Wales IS
23	MF	Kwame Yeboah	2 June 1994 (aged 16)	(Football Australia) Queensland AS
24	MF	Jakob Williams	8 April 1994 (aged 16)	(Football Australia) ACT Academy
25	DF	Riley Woodcock	23 May 1995 (aged 15)	(Football Australia) Western Australia IS

=== Timor Leste ===
Head coach: Agostinho Mesquita

No.	Pos.	Player	Date of birth (age)	Club
1	GK	**Ramos Maxanches**	12 April 1994 (aged 16)	(East Timor Football Federation) Porto Taibesse
2	DF	**Raimundo Sarmento**	10 October 1994 (aged 16)	(East Timor Football Federation) Dili United
4	DF	Olandino de Jesus		(East Timor Football Federation)
5	DF	**Nelson Sing**	10 April 1995 (aged 15)	(East Timor Football Federation) AD Dili Oeste
6	MF	**José Fonseca**	19 September 1994 (aged 16)	(East Timor Football Federation)
7	FW	José Martins	9 March 1994 (aged 16)	(East Timor Football Federation)
8	MF	**Nilo Soares**	18 July 1994 (aged 16)	(East Timor Football Federation) AD Dili Oeste
9	FW	**Nidio Ricardo**	17 June 1994 (aged 16)	(East Timor Football Federation)
10	FW	Rifqi Zulfahmi		(East Timor Football Federation)
12	MF	Fidel de Araujo		(East Timor Football Federation)
13	FW	Valentim Apolnario		(East Timor Football Federation)
14	MF	**Jorge Sabas**	5 December 1997 (aged 12)	(East Timor Football Federation) Persiku Dynamo Kupang
15	DF	**Adelino Trindade**	2 June 1995 (aged 15)	(East Timor Football Federation) AD Baucau
16	DF	**Nidio Neto**	9 October 1995 (aged 15)	(East Timor Football Federation)
18	MF	**Nataniel Reis**	25 March 1995 (aged 15)	(East Timor Football Federation) Porto Taibesse
19	MF	**Boavida Olegario**	24 October 1994 (aged 16)	(East Timor Football Federation) AD Dili Oeste
20	GK	**Fagio Augusto**	29 April 1997 (aged 13)	(East Timor Football Federation)
22	MF	**José Oliveira**	28 October 1997 (aged 12)	(East Timor Football Federation)

=== Vietnam ===
Head coach: Hoàng Văn Phúc

No.	Pos.	Player	Date of birth (age)	Club
1	GK	Lê Văn Nghĩa	14 June 1994 (aged 16)	(Vietnam Football Federation) Hanoi
2	DF	Nguyễn Hạ Long	9 March 1994 (aged 16)	(Vietnam Football Federation) Megastar NĐ
3	DF	Hoàng Sơn Tùng		(Vietnam Football Federation) Hòa Phát
4	MF	Đào Duy Khánh	30 January 1994 (aged 16)	(Vietnam Football Federation) SHB Da Nang
5	DF	Đặng Việt Phương	20 February 1994 (aged 16)	(Vietnam Football Federation) Haiphong
6	DF	Nguyễn Công Danh		(Vietnam Football Federation) Đồng Tháp
7	MF	Đặng Anh Tuấn	1 August 1994 (aged 16)	(Vietnam Football Federation) SHB Da Nang
8	DF	Đỗ Mạnh Giang		(Vietnam Football Federation) Hanoi
10	MF	Huỳnh Tấn Tài	17 August 1994 (aged 16)	(Vietnam Football Federation) Dong Tam Long An
11	DF	Võ Ngọc Đức	10 October 1994 (aged 16)	(Vietnam Football Federation) Song Lam Nghe An
12	DF	Nguyễn Ánh Phương		(Vietnam Football Federation) SHB Da Nang
14	MF	Nguyễn Minh Hải	9 January 1994 (aged 16)	(Vietnam Football Federation) Hanoi
15	FW	Nguyễn Việt Thắng		(Vietnam Football Federation) SHB Da Nang
16	FW	Nguyễn Đỏ		(Vietnam Football Federation) Scavi Rocheteau
19	GK	Nguyễn Sơn Hải	1 July 1994 (aged 16)	(Vietnam Football Federation) Đồng Tháp
22	FW	Nguyễn Anh Phong		(Vietnam Football Federation) SHB Da Nang
23	FW	Nguyễn Văn Núi		(Vietnam Football Federation) Megastar NĐ
25	MF	Nguyễn Xuân Nam	18 January 1994 (aged 16)	(Vietnam Football Federation) Hanoi
31	GK	Huỳnh Bá Lệnh		(Vietnam Football Federation) Khatoco Khánh Hòa
33	MF	Nguyễn Văn Thành	4 November 1994 (aged 15)	(Vietnam Football Federation)
34	MF	Hồ Phúc Tịnh	28 April 1994 (aged 16)	(Vietnam Football Federation) Song Lam Nghe An

== Group D ==
=== United Arab Emirates ===
Head coach: Bader Ahmed Saleh

No.	Pos.	Player	Date of birth (age)	Club
1	GK	Nasser Abdulla		(United Arab Emirates Football Association) Al-Ain
2	DF	Ebrahim Hasan	11 December 1994 (aged 15)	(United Arab Emirates Football Association) Ras Al-Khaima
3	DF	Mansour Abdulrahman	1 April 1994 (aged 16)	(United Arab Emirates Football Association) Al-Ain
4	DF	Hassan Shambeeh	5 February 1994 (aged 16)	(United Arab Emirates Football Association) Al-Ahli
5	DF	Marwan Jumah	8 April 1994 (aged 16)	(United Arab Emirates Football Association) Al-Fujairah
6	MF	Khaled Khamis	14 September 1994 (aged 16)	(United Arab Emirates Football Association) Ras Al-Khaima
7	MF	Johar Ahmad	1 May 1994 (aged 16)	(United Arab Emirates Football Association) Al-Dhafra
8	MF	**Ahmed Barman**	5 February 1994 (aged 16)	(United Arab Emirates Football Association) Al-Ain
9	FW	**Yousif Saeed**	4 September 1994 (aged 16)	(United Arab Emirates Football Association) Sharjah
10	FW	Majid Shahin	21 June 1994 (aged 16)	(United Arab Emirates Football Association) Al-Nasr
11	MF	Salah Al-Hammadi		(United Arab Emirates Football Association) Al-Wahda
12	DF	Jassim Hassan	30 September 1994 (aged 16)	(United Arab Emirates Football Association) Al-Shabab
13	DF	Fares Mohamed	14 November 1994 (aged 15)	(United Arab Emirates Football Association) Emirates
14	DF	Saeed Al-Rawahi	1 February 1994 (aged 16)	(United Arab Emirates Football Association) Al-Ain
15	MF	Mohamed Abdalla		(United Arab Emirates Football Association) Al-Jazira
16	MF	Khaled Amber	23 April 1994 (aged 16)	(United Arab Emirates Football Association) Emirates
18	MF	Salem Al-Kaabi	21 January 1994 (aged 16)	(United Arab Emirates Football Association) Al-Ain
20	FW	Khalid Yousuf	6 May 1994 (aged 16)	(United Arab Emirates Football Association) Al-Shabab
22	GK	**Hassan Hamza**	10 November 1994 (aged 15)	(United Arab Emirates Football Association) Al-Shabab
23	FW	Abdulla Moosa	12 January 1994 (aged 16)	(United Arab Emirates Football Association) Al-Nasr
24	MF	Bader Mubarak		(United Arab Emirates Football Association) Al-Wahda
27	GK	Ibrahim Eisa	10 April 1994 (aged 16)	(United Arab Emirates Football Association) Al-Nasr
45	FW	**Ahmed Rabee**	14 August 1995 (aged 15)	(United Arab Emirates Football Association) Al-Jazira

=== Iraq ===
Head coach: Atheer Isam

No.	Pos.	Player	Date of birth (age)	Club
1	GK	Osama Luay		(Iraq Football Association)
2	DF	Samer Salman		(Iraq Football Association)
3	DF	Jalal Adnan		(Iraq Football Association)
5	DF	Husam Haitham		(Iraq Football Association)
7	MF	Abbas Ali Hasan		(Iraq Football Association)
8	MF	Rasool Hussein		(Iraq Football Association)
9	FW	Hussein Al-Fuadi		(Iraq Football Association)
10	FW	Ali Hussein Fandi		(Iraq Football Association) Al-Shorta
11	MF	**Mahdi Kamel**	6 January 1995 (aged 15)	(Iraq Football Association) Al-Shorta
12	MF	Haider Khudhair	2 February 1994 (aged 16)	(Iraq Football Association) Al-Talaba
13	DF	Jafar Abdul-Hassan		(Iraq Football Association)
14	MF	**Ali Faez**	9 September 1994 (aged 16)	(Iraq Football Association) Al-Sinaa
15	DF	**Dhurgham Ismail**	23 May 1994 (aged 16)	(Iraq Football Association) Naft Maysan
16	MF	Muntadhar Abdul-Kareem		(Iraq Football Association)
17	MF	Ali Raheem		(Iraq Football Association)
18	FW	**Abdul-Qadir Tariq**	25 January 1994 (aged 16)	(Iraq Football Association) Al-Karkh
19	MF	Hussein Raheem		(Iraq Football Association)
20	GK	Omar Attiya		(Iraq Football Association)
22	MF	Sajad Raad	15 April 1994 (aged 16)	(Iraq Football Association)
23	DF	Mustafa Tareq		(Iraq Football Association)
24	DF	Ridha Nasrallah	1 January 1994 (aged 16)	(Iraq Football Association) Kirkuk
25	DF	Mohammed Maan	10 July 1994 (aged 16)	(Iraq Football Association) Al-Naft
33	GK	**Fahad Talib**	21 October 1994 (aged 16)	(Iraq Football Association) Al-Quwa Al-Jawiya

=== China ===
Head coach: Cao Xiandong

No.	Pos.	Player	Date of birth (age)	Club
1	GK	Xu Jiamin	11 April 1994 (aged 16)	(Chinese Football Association) Shanghai Dongya
2	DF	Yang Shiyuan	11 March 1994 (aged 16)	(Chinese Football Association) Shanghai Dongya
3	DF	**Liu Yiming**	28 February 1995 (aged 15)	(Chinese Football Association) Dalian Yiteng
4	DF	Wu Haoran	18 January 1994 (aged 16)	(Chinese Football Association) Shandong Luneng
5	DF	Sun Zheng'ao	8 March 1994 (aged 16)	(Chinese Football Association) Hangzhou Greentown
6	MF	Hu Bowen	20 January 1994 (aged 16)	(Chinese Football Association) Shanghai Dongya
7	MF	Su Shun	9 March 1994 (aged 16)	(Chinese Football Association) Tianjin Locomotive
9	FW	Shen Tianfeng	18 March 1994 (aged 16)	(Chinese Football Association) Shaanxi Chanba
10	FW	Zheng Dalun	11 February 1994 (aged 16)	(Chinese Football Association) Shanghai Dongya
11	MF	Liang Yu	20 April 1994 (aged 16)	(Chinese Football Association) Tianjin Locomotive
12	GK	Wang Boyan	26 January 1995 (aged 15)	(Chinese Football Association) Dalian Yiteng
13	MF	Zheng Fengwei	20 January 1994 (aged 16)	(Chinese Football Association) Shandong Luneng
14	FW	Chen Shuo	13 January 1994 (aged 16)	(Chinese Football Association) Hubei Greenery
16	DF	Wu Hao	23 June 1994 (aged 16)	(Chinese Football Association) Sichuan FA
17	DF	Liao Junjian	27 January 1994 (aged 16)	(Chinese Football Association) Dongguan Nancheng
18	MF	Hu Weiwei	3 March 1994 (aged 16)	(Chinese Football Association) Dongguan Nancheng
19	MF	Luo Tian	11 March 1994 (aged 16)	(Chinese Football Association) Dongguan Nancheng
21	DF	Sun Ningzhe	9 March 1994 (aged 16)	(Chinese Football Association) Tianjin TEDA
22	GK	Liu Yu	21 February 1995 (aged 15)	(Chinese Football Association) Changchun Yatai
25	MF	Xie Fuquan	16 February 1994 (aged 16)	(Chinese Football Association) Shandong Luneng
30	DF	Wang Jiong	5 January 1994 (aged 16)	(Chinese Football Association) Shandong Luneng
32	MF	Zhou Shengkai	9 May 1994 (aged 16)	(Chinese Football Association) Tianjin TEDA
35	FW	**Li Shuai**	18 June 1995 (aged 15)	(Chinese Football Association) Shaanxi Chanba

=== Kuwait ===
Head coach: Anwar Boutaiban

No.	Pos.	Player	Date of birth (age)	Club
2	DF	Abdulaziz Al-Mutairi		(Kuwait Football Association)
3	DF	Mohammad Al-Enezi	27 December 1993 (aged 16)	(Kuwait Football Association) Al-Kuwait
4	DF	Faisal Abdullah	16 June 1994 (aged 16)	(Kuwait Football Association) Al-Qadsia
5	DF	Nader Al-Enezi	19 January 1994 (aged 16)	(Kuwait Football Association) Al-Sahel
6	MF	Saad Al-Azemi		(Kuwait Football Association)
7	MF	Faisal Al-Subaiei		(Kuwait Football Association)
8	MF	Abdulla Al-Shemeri		(Kuwait Football Association)
9	FW	Metab Al-Shammeri		(Kuwait Football Association)
10	FW	Marzouq Al-Ajmi		(Kuwait Football Association)
11	FW	Mohammad Al-Fahad	29 January 1994 (aged 16)	(Kuwait Football Association) Al-Qadsia
12	MF	Mohammad Al-Sarheed		(Kuwait Football Association)
15	DF	Yousef Abdullah		(Kuwait Football Association)
17	MF	Nawaf Al-Emtairat		(Kuwait Football Association)
19	MF	Mohammad Al-Qabandi		(Kuwait Football Association) Al-Tadhamon
20	MF	Khalid Al-Subaie		(Kuwait Football Association)
21	MF	**Abdullah Al-Rashidi**	28 November 1995 (aged 14)	(Kuwait Football Association) Al-Qadsia
22	GK	**Saud Al-Jenaie**	12 June 1994 (aged 16)	(Kuwait Football Association) Al-Arabi
23	GK	Waleed Al-Rashidi		(Kuwait Football Association)
24	GK	Ahmad Mohammad		(Kuwait Football Association)
27	DF	Omar Al-Adwani		(Kuwait Football Association)
30	DF	Abdullah Abdulrahman		(Kuwait Football Association)
35	GK	Abdullah Al-Subaiei	23 December 1993 (aged 16)	(Kuwait Football Association)
49	MF	Soud Al-Enezi		(Kuwait Football Association)
