= 2010 AFC U-16 Championship qualification =

Football tournament qualification stage

The Qualification Competition for the 2010 AFC U-16 Championship

== Format ==
For all the groups with six teams, the winner and runners-up of each group qualified for the 2010 AFC U-16 Championship Finals. For the one group with three teams, only the group winner qualified. And the one best third-placed team from all the groups with six teams qualified for the 2010 AFC U-16 Championship Finals.

== Seedings ==
The draw for the 2010 AFC U-16 Championship (Qualifiers) took place at AFC House on 20 February 2009.

A total number of 45 teams are eligible for the qualifying competition. The West Zone comprised 24 teams and they drew according to their ranking to make four groups of six teams each.

The East Zone had 21 teams and they drew into three groups of six teams and one group of three teams.

=== West Asia ===
(Ranked 1st to 23rd)

1. Iran
2. United Arab Emirates
3. Syria
4. Saudi Arabia
5. Uzbekistan
6. Bahrain
7. India
8. Yemen
9. Turkmenistan
10. Lebanon
11. Qatar
12. Kuwait
13. Palestine
14. Nepal
15. Sri Lanka (W)
16. Oman
17. Jordan
18. Pakistan
19. Iraq
20. Tajikistan
21. Kyrgyzstan
22. Bhutan
23. Afghanistan
23. Maldives (W)

=== East Asia ===
(Ranked 1st to 19th)

1. South Korea
2. Japan
3. Australia
4. China
5. Malaysia
6. Indonesia
7. Singapore
8. Thailand
9. Laos
10. Guam
11. Mongolia (W)
12. Vietnam
13. Chinese Taipei
14. Hong Kong
15. North Korea
16. Bangladesh
17. Cambodia
18. Macau
19. Myanmar
19. Philippines
19. Timor-Leste

=== Notes ===
- Brunei – Did not enter
- Bangladesh – Initially withdrew and then later re-entered.
- Mongolia – Officially withdrew on 17 September
- Sri Lanka – Officially withdrew on 17 September
- Maldives – Officially withdrew on 4 October

== Group A ==
All matches will be held in Kuala Lumpur, Malaysia (UTC+8).

Team	Pld	W	D	L	GF	GA	GD	Pts
Uzbekistan	4	3	1	0	10	0	+10	10
Kuwait	4	3	0	1	8	3	+5	9
Saudi Arabia	4	2	1	1	3	1	+2	7
Pakistan	4	0	1	3	1	7	−6	1
Afghanistan	4	0	1	3	1	12	−11	1
Sri Lanka	withdrew							

19 October 2009
14:00

Saudi Arabia	1–0	Afghanistan
Al-Muwallad 16'	Report

Panasonic Stadium, Kuala Lumpur
Attendance: 300
Referee: Hla Tint (Myanmar)
19 October 2009
17:00

Uzbekistan	3–0	Pakistan
Mahstaliyev 21'; Khakimov 74'; Mirabdullaev 90+2'	Report

Panasonic Stadium, Kuala Lumpur
Attendance: 200
Referee: Mawla Hussain Al-Raeisi (Qatar)

21 October 2009
14:00

Uzbekistan	3–0	Kuwait
Mahstaliyev 18', 66'; Abdullaev 86'	Report

Panasonic Stadium, Kuala Lumpur
Attendance: 200
Referee: Mohammad Mousa (Jordan)
21 October 2009
17:00

Pakistan	0–2	Saudi Arabia
	Report	Qassem 76'; Khan 87' (o.g.)

Panasonic Stadium, Kuala Lumpur
Attendance: 150
Referee: Abdul Hannan Miron (Bangladesh)

23 October 2009
14:00

Pakistan	0–1	Kuwait
	Report	S. Al-Enezi 72'

Panasonic Stadium, Kuala Lumpur
Attendance: 150
Referee: Dmitriy Mashentsev (Kyrgyzstan)
23 October 2009
17:00

Afghanistan	0–4	Uzbekistan
	Report	Mirabdullaev 9'; Khakimov 15', 29'; Jakbarov 67'

Panasonic Stadium, Kuala Lumpur
Attendance: 60
Referee: Mohammad Mousa (Jordan)

25 October 2009
14:00

Afghanistan	1–1	Pakistan
Mohammadi 50'	Report	Faheem 89'

Panasonic Stadium, Kuala Lumpur
Attendance: 50
Referee: Abdul Hannan Miron (Bangladesh)
25 October 2009
17:00

Kuwait	1–0	Saudi Arabia
N. Al-Enezi 47'	Report

Panasonic Stadium, Kuala Lumpur
Attendance: 450
Referee: Mawla Hussain Al-Raeisi (Qatar)

27 October 2009
14:00

Saudi Arabia	0–0	Uzbekistan
	Report

Panasonic Stadium, Kuala Lumpur
Attendance: 200
Referee: Dmitriy Mashentsev (Kyrgyzstan)
27 October 2009
17:00

Afghanistan	0–6	Kuwait
	Report	Al-Fahad 8', 51', 68', 77'; Al-Sarheed 47'; S. Al-Enezi 65'

Panasonic Stadium, Kuala Lumpur
Attendance: 70
Referee: Hla Tint (Myanmar)

== Group B ==
All matches will be held in Kathmandu, Nepal (UTC+5:45).

Team	Pld	W	D	L	GF	GA	GD	Pts
Iran	4	3	1	0	9	0	+9	10
Tajikistan	4	3	1	0	9	0	+9	10
Bahrain	4	2	0	2	7	5	+2	6
Nepal (H)	4	1	0	3	3	12	−9	3
Lebanon	4	0	0	4	1	12	−11	0
Maldives	withdrew							

5 October 2009
12:30

Bahrain	0–2	Tajikistan
	Report	Muhtojzoda 28'; Rasulov 73'

Dashrath Stadium, Kathmandu
Attendance: 600
Referee: Chaiya Mahapab (Thailand)
5 October 2009
15:00

Lebanon	0–3 Awarded	Nepal
Saad 14'	Report

Dashrath Stadium, Kathmandu
Attendance: 2,300
Referee: Shaban Ali (Kuwait)

7 October 2009
12:30

Bahrain	2–1	Lebanon
Mubarak 45+2'; H. Khaled 85'	Report	Saad 32'

Dashrath Stadium, Kathmandu
Attendance: 250
Referee: Kadhum Auda (Iraq)
7 October 2009
15:00

Tajikistan	0–0	Iran
	Report

Dashrath Stadium, Kathmandu
Attendance: 200
Referee: Jaber Suleiman (Jordan)

9 October 2009
12:30

Tajikistan	3–0	Lebanon
Rasulov 4', 65'; Sultonov 47'	Report

Dashrath Stadium, Kathmandu
Attendance: 100
Referee: Mohammed Al-Labani (Yemen)
9 October 2009
15:00

Iran	3–0	Nepal
Tamang 34' (o.g.); Hassanifar 60'; Aeinehchi 89'	Report

Dashrath Stadium, Kathmandu
Attendance: 3,200
Referee: Vadim Agishev (Uzbekistan)

11 October 2009
12:30

Lebanon	0–4	Iran
	Report	Mehdipour 47'; Aeinehchi 55', 85', 86'

Dashrath Stadium, Kathmandu
Attendance: 300
Referee: Chaiya Mahapab (Thailand)
11 October 2009
15:00

Nepal	0–5	Bahrain
	Report	Salem 28' (pen.); Abdulhusain 38', 40'; Abbas 48'; Abdulameer 90+2'

Dashrath Stadium, Kathmandu
Attendance: 400
Referee: Charymurat Kurbanov (Turkmenistan)

13 October 2009
12:30

Iran	2–0	Bahrain
Fathian 44' (pen.); Aeinehchi 58'	Report

Dashrath Stadium, Kathmandu
Attendance: 100
Referee: Shaban Ali (Kuwait)
13 October 2009
15:00

Tajikistan	4–0	Nepal
Sultonov 8'; Muhtojzoda 64'; Rajabalizoda 74'; Rasulov 90'	Report

Dashrath Stadium, Kathmandu
Attendance: 400
Referee: Kadhum Auda (Iraq)

== Group C ==
All matches will be held in Sana'a, Yemen (UTC+4).

Team	Pld	W	D	L	GF	GA	GD	Pts
Syria	5	5	0	0	23	0	+23	15
Iraq	5	4	0	1	15	3	+12	12
Yemen (H)	5	3	0	2	12	3	+9	9
Qatar	5	2	0	3	6	8	−2	6
Palestine	5	1	0	4	3	17	−14	3
Bhutan	5	0	0	5	2	30	−28	0

8 October 2009
15:30

Syria	10–0	Bhutan
Aisa 7', 68', 86'; Al-Taki 11'; Hamadi 13'; Omar 34', 78', 90+1'; Al-Sebae 42'; Sabooh 71'	Report

Sha'ab Sana'a Stadium, Sana'a
Attendance: 700
Referee: Muzaffar Abdullaev (Kyrgyzstan)
8 October 2009
16:00

Qatar	1–0	Palestine
Jamal 53'	Report

Ali Mohsen Al-Muraisi Stadium, Sana'a
Attendance: 4,500
Referee: Abdulrahman Al-Qahtani (Saudi Arabia)
8 October 2009
19:00

Yemen	0–1	Iraq
	Report	Haitham 78'

Ali Mohsen Al-Muraisi Stadium, Sana'a
Attendance: 6,000
Referee: Mohamed Al Zarouni (UAE)

10 October 2009
15:30

Palestine	2–1	Bhutan
Nababta 27', 83'	Report	Gyeltshen 17'

Sha'ab Sana'a Stadium, Sana'a
Attendance: 500
Referee: Hettikankanamge Pereira (Sri Lanka)
10 October 2009
19:00

Yemen	2–1	Qatar
Hussein 23'; Al-Kawni 90+4'	Report	Jamal 60'

Ali Mohsen Al-Muraisi Stadium, Sana'a
Attendance: 7,000
Referee: Andre El Haddad (Lebanon)
12 October 2009
15:30

Iraq	0–1	Syria
	Report	Al-Housni 73'

Ali Mohsen Al-Muraisi Stadium, Sana'a
Attendance: 2,500
Referee: Abdullah Al-Harrasi (Oman)

14 October 2009
15:30

Iraq	4–0	Qatar
Abdulhassan 5'; Hussein 18' (pen.); Hasan 55', 80'	Report

Sha'ab Sana'a Stadium, Sana'a
Attendance: 1,500
Referee: Mohamed Al Zarouni (UAE)
14 October 2009
15:30

Syria	9–0	Palestine
Omar 3', 35', 54'; Shaker 16', 25', 60'; Aisa 19'; Al-Housni 78'; Al-Ali 83'	Report

Ali Mohsen Al-Muraisi Stadium, Sana'a
Attendance: 2,000
Referee: Ali Abdulnabi (Bahrain)
14 October 2009
19:00

Bhutan	0–7	Yemen
	Report	Hussein 10', 76', 90+4'; Hamood 19', 71'; Abdulwahid 47'; Abduldaim 53'

Ali Mohsen Al-Muraisi Stadium, Sana'a
Attendance: 6,000
Referee: Muzaffar Abdullaev (Kyrgyzstan)

16 October 2009
15:30

Qatar	0–2	Syria
	Report	Al-Ali 47'; Omar 76'

Sha'ab Sana'a Stadium, Sana'a
Attendance: 1,000
Referee: Ali Abdulnabi (Bahrain)
16 October 2009
15:30

Bhutan	1–7	Iraq
D. Tshering 45' (pen.)	Report	Hasan 10'; Hussein 19', 30', 38'; Fendi 35', 59'; Raheem 86'

Ali Mohsen Al-Muraisi Stadium, Sana'a
Attendance: 2,000
Referee: Abdulrahman Al-Qahtani (Saudi Arabia)
16 October 2009
19:00

Palestine	0–3	Yemen
	Report	Jalayta 9' (o.g.); Hussein 26'; Abdulwahid 72'

Ali Mohsen Al-Muraisi Stadium, Sana'a
Attendance: 6,500
Referee: Hettikankanamge Pereira (Sri Lanka)

18 October 2009
15:30

Iraq	3–1	Palestine
Hussein 17', 28'; Fendi 38'	Report	Maraaba 44'

Sha'ab Sana'a Stadium, Sana'a
Attendance: 2,300
Referee: Andre El Haddad (Lebanon)
18 October 2009
15:30

Bhutan	0–4	Qatar
	Report	Jamal 32' (pen.), 43', 65'; Al-Abdulrahman 83'

Ali Mohsen Al-Muraisi Stadium, Sana'a
Attendance: 1,500
Referee: Abdullah Al-Harrasi (Oman)
18 October 2009
19:00

Syria	1–0	Yemen
Al-Housni 40'	Report

Ali Mohsen Al-Muraisi Stadium, Sana'a
Attendance: 15,000
Referee: Mohamed Al Zarouni (UAE)

== Group D ==
All matches will be held in Al Ain, United Arab Emirates (UTC+3).

Team	Pld	W	D	L	GF	GA	GD	Pts
United Arab Emirates(H)	5	4	1	0	19	4	+15	13
Jordan	5	3	2	0	12	5	+7	11
Oman	5	3	1	1	8	3	+5	10
Kyrgyzstan	5	1	1	3	4	8	−4	4
India	5	1	1	3	6	15	−9	4
Turkmenistan	5	0	0	5	4	18	−14	0

3 October 2009
15:30

United Arab Emirates	3–0	Kyrgyzstan
Saeed Ali 2'; Moosa 12'; K. Khamis 77'	Report

Al Qatara Stadium, Al Ain
Attendance: 300
Referee: Haitham Mohammed (Iraq)
3 October 2009
17:45

India	1–6	Jordan
Dhar 88'	Report	Soubar 22', 30', 69', 82'; Al-Bashtawi 67', 74'

Al Qatara Stadium, Al Ain
Attendance: 1,000
Referee: Tayeb Hasan Shamsuzzaman (Bangladesh)
3 October 2009
20:00

Turkmenistan	0–2	Oman
	Report	S. Yousuf 26'; Juma 66'

Al Qatara Stadium, Al Ain
Attendance: 100
Referee: Alireza Faghani (Iran)

5 October 2009
15:30

India	2–1	Turkmenistan
Sampingiraj 4'; Negi 17'	Report	Sultanov 37' (pen.)

Al Qatara Stadium, Al Ain
Attendance: 200
Referee: Ravshan Ishmatov (Tajikistan)
5 October 2009
17:45

Oman	2–0	Kyrgyzstan
H. Said 77'; M. Said 89'	Report

Al Qatara Stadium, Al Ain
Attendance: 100
Referee: Mukhtar Al Yarimi (Yemen)
5 October 2009
20:00

Jordan	0–0	United Arab Emirates
	Report

Al Qatara Stadium, Al Ain
Attendance: 2,000
Referee: Rustam Kholov (Tajikistan)

8 October 2009
15:30

Jordan	3–2	Turkmenistan
Obeidat 26'; Al-Bashtawi 67' (pen.); Haddad 68'	Report	Surwat 35' (o.g.); Sultanov 50'

Al Qatara Stadium, Al Ain
Attendance: 200
Referee: Alireza Faghani (Iran)
8 October 2009
17:45

United Arab Emirates	2–1	Oman
Barman 45+2'; Mubarak 77'	Report	Sabeit 87' (pen.)

Al Qatara Stadium, Al Ain
Attendance: 300
Referee: Haitham Mohammed (Iraq)
8 October 2009
20:00

Kyrgyzstan	0–0	India
	Report

Al Qatara Stadium, Al Ain
Attendance: 100
Referee: Tayeb Hasan Shamsuzzaman (Bangladesh)

10 October 2009
15:30

Oman	2–0	India
Al-Hajri 55', 59'	Report

Al Qatara Stadium, Al Ain
Attendance: 200
Referee: Rustam Kholov (Tajikistan)
10 October 2009
17:45

Kyrgyzstan	1–2	Jordan
Kudaiberdiev 3'	Report	Soubar 30', 87'

Al Qatara Stadium, Al Ain
Attendance: 200
Referee: Ravshan Ishmatov (Tajikistan)
10 October 2009
20:00

Turkmenistan	0–8	United Arab Emirates
	Report	Moosa 1', 42'; Saeed 15', 16', 20', 28', 47'; K. Khamis 54'

Al Qatara Stadium, Al Ain
Attendance: 300
Referee: Mukhtar Al Yarimi (Yemen)

13 October 2009
15:30

United Arab Emirates	6–3	India
Banihammad 19'; Saeed Ali 21'; Shahin 26' (pen.); Saeed 44'; K. Khamis 63'; Barman 82' (pen.)	Report	Dhar 10'; Fernandes 55' (pen.); Samandram 78'

Al Qatara Stadium, Al Ain
Attendance: 100
Referee: Haitham Mohammed (Iraq)
13 October 2009
17:45

Kyrgyzstan	3–1	Turkmenistan
Umarov 17'; Musabekov 43', 71'	Report	Kurbanov 22'

Al Qatara Stadium, Al Ain
Attendance: 100
Referee: Tayeb Hasan Shamsuzzaman (Bangladesh)
13 October 2009
20:00

Jordan	1–1	Oman
Soubar 5' (pen.)	Report	H. Said 75'

Al Qatara Stadium, Al Ain
Attendance: 200
Referee: Alireza Faghani (Iran)

== Group E ==
All matches will be held in Bacolod, Philippines (UTC+8).

Team	Pld	W	D	L	GF	GA	GD	Pts
Japan	4	4	0	0	26	0	+26	12
Indonesia	4	2	1	1	10	3	+7	7
Chinese Taipei	4	2	0	2	6	8	−2	6
Bangladesh	4	1	1	2	2	8	−6	4
Philippines (H)	4	0	0	4	1	26	−25	0
Mongolia	withdrew							

3 October 2009
14:00

Japan	12–0	Philippines
Hayakawa 4', 15', 32', 48', 55'; Minamino 18', 21', 27'; Iwanami 29', 70'; Shinjo 60'; Takano 89'	Report

Panaad Stadium, Bacolod
Attendance: 2,500
Referee: Craig Zetter (Australia)

3 October 2009
16:30

Indonesia	0–0	Bangladesh
	Report

Panaad Stadium, Bacolod
Attendance: 2,000
Referee: Ng Kai Lam (Hong Kong)

5 October 2009
14:00

Chinese Taipei	4–1	Philippines
Ko Yu-ting 7', 50'; Lee Meng-che 14'; Shih Kun-huei 40'	Report	Watanabe 90+2'

Panaad Stadium, Bacolod
Attendance: 1,000
Referee: Saeid Mozaffarizadeh (Iran)
5 October 2009
16:30

Bangladesh	0–6	Japan
	Report	Minamino 12', 72', 74'; Miyamura 48'; Hayakawa 77', 82'

Panaad Stadium, Bacolod
Attendance: 500
Referee: Vo Minh Tri (Vietnam)

7 October 2009
14:00

Japan	5–0	Chinese Taipei
Minamino 20', 28'; Takano 53'; Tokunaga 89'; Kanda 90+4'	Report

Panaad Stadium, Bacolod
Attendance: 600
Referee: Saleem Ali (Maldives)
7 October 2009
16:30

Philippines	0–9	Indonesia
	Report	Wibowo 7', 57'; Masko Kiwak 17'; P. Putra 33', 49'; Alfiansyah 66'; Nugroho 70'; A. Putra 86'; Mutolib 90+1'

Panaad Stadium, Bacolod
Attendance: 600
Referee: Ng Kai Lam (Hong Kong)

9 October 2009
14:00

Chinese Taipei	0–1	Indonesia
	Report	P. Putra 67'

Panaad Stadium, Bacolod
Attendance: 600
Referee: Craig Zetter (Australia)
9 October 2009
16:30

Philippines	0–1	Bangladesh
	Report	Zaman 3' (pen.)

Panaad Stadium, Bacolod
Attendance: 1,000
Referee: Saeid Mozaffarizadeh (Iran)

11 October 2009
14:00

Japan	3–0	Indonesia
Hayakawa 55'; Takano 64', 65'	Report

Panaad Stadium, Bacolod
Attendance: 500
Referee: Vo Minh Tri (Vietnam)
11 October 2009
16:30

Bangladesh	1–2	Chinese Taipei
Rana 75'	Report	Tsai Hung-wei 20'; Lee Meng-che 84'

Panaad Stadium, Bacolod
Attendance: 500
Referee: Saleem Ali (Maldives)

== Group F ==
All matches will be held in Hebei, China (UTC+8).

Team	Pld	W	D	L	GF	GA	GD	Pts
China (H)	5	4	1	0	29	0	+29	13
Timor-Leste	5	4	1	0	22	0	+22	13
Hong Kong	5	2	1	2	16	13	+3	7
Singapore	5	2	1	2	8	12	−4	7
Guam	5	1	0	4	9	11	−2	3
Macau	5	0	0	5	1	49	−48	0

21 September 2009
13:00

Singapore	4–0	Macau
Raushyan 17'; Stephen 30'; Cher 88'; Nur Ridho 90+1'	Report

Xianghe NTFC Stadium, Hebei
Referee: Phung Dinh Dung (Vietnam)
21 September 2009
13:00

Guam	2–3	Hong Kong
Cruz 33'; Damian 35'	Report	Tsui Hoi Kin 23', 86'; Fernandes 85'

Xianghe NTFC Stadium, Hebei
Referee: Hettikankanamge Pereira (Sri Lanka)
21 September 2009
15:30

China	0–0	Timor-Leste
	Report

Xianghe NTFC Stadium, Hebei
Referee: Saleem Ali (Maldives)

23 September 2009
13:00

Singapore	3–1	Guam
Raushyan 14', 51', 90+3'	Report	Cruz 42'

Xianghe NTFC Stadium, Hebei
Referee: Dmitriy Mashentsev (Kyrgyzstan)
23 September 2009
13:00

Hong Kong	0–3	Timor-Leste
	Report	Batista 40'; Almeida 57', 86'

Xianghe NTFC Stadium, Hebei
Referee: Akbar Bakhshizadeh (Iran)
23 September 2009
15:30

Macau	0–14	China
	Report	Chen Han 1', 8', 34'; Hu Weiwei 20' (pen.), 22', 41', 44'; Zheng Dalun 31', 36', 54', 87'; Qiu Daming 52', 65'; Shen Tianfeng 81'

Xianghe NTFC Stadium, Hebei
Referee: Sachiko Yamagishi (Japan)

26 September 2009
13:00

Macau	0–6	Guam
	Report	Cruz 6', 65'; Kam Chi Hou 42' (o.g.); Topsana 62'; Naputi 64'; Perez 66'

Xianghe NTFC Stadium, Hebei
Referee: Akbar Bakhshizadeh (Iran)
26 September 2009
13:00

Timor-Leste	3–0	Singapore
Olegario 11'; Almeida 16' dos Santos 89'	Report

Xianghe NTFC Stadium, Hebei
Referee: Nitipum Kullabut (Thailand)
26 September 2009
15:30

China	6–0	Hong Kong
Chen Han 15', 32'; Hu Weiwei 27', 45+1'; Qiu Daming 31'; Zheng Dalun 71'	Report

Xianghe NTFC Stadium, Hebei
Referee: Phung Dinh Dung (Vietnam)

28 September 2009
13:00

Hong Kong	1–1	Singapore
Lau Tak Yan 74'	Report	Nur Ridho 67'

Xianghe NTFC Stadium, Hebei
Referee: Dmitriy Mashentsev (Kyrgyzstan)
28 September 2009
13:00

Timor-Leste	13–0	Macau
Zulfahmi 6', 11'; Sarmento 14', 25', 33'; Reis 19', 38', 85'; Sabas 21'; Ady 49'; Ricky 53', 68' (pen.) dos Santos 66'	Report

Xianghe NTFC Stadium, Hebei
Referee: Hettikankanamge Pereira (Sri Lanka)
28 September 2009
15:30

Guam	0–2	China
	Report	Zheng Dalun 50'; Hu Weiwei 67'

Xianghe NTFC Stadium, Hebei
Referee: Sachiko Yamagishi (Japan)

1 October 2009
13:00

Timor-Leste	3–0	Guam
Almeida 40' da Fonseca 56'; Ricky 57'	Report

Xianghe NTFC Stadium, Hebei
Referee: Nitipum Kullabut (Thailand)
1 October 2009
13:00

Macau	1–12	Hong Kong
Vilas 40'	Report	Fernandes 8'; Tsui Hoi Kin 10', 42', 45+2', 90+1'; Hui Ka Lok 30'; Chuck Yiu Kwok 35', 45+1'; Wong Chun Hin 54'; Luk Tsz Ho 61'; Tsang Tsz Hin 75', 90+3'

Xianghe NTFC Stadium, Hebei
Referee: Saleem Ali (Maldives)
1 October 2009
15:30

China	7–0	Singapore
Stephen 4' (o.g.); Qiu Daming 12'; Wu Haoran 20'; Chen Han 38', 54'; Hu Weiwei 45+1', 72'	Report

Xianghe NTFC Stadium, Hebei
Referee: Akbar Bakhshizadeh (Iran)

== Group G ==
All matches will be held in Bangkok, Thailand (UTC+7).

Team	Pld	W	D	L	GF	GA	GD	Pts
North Korea	5	4	1	0	15	4	+11	13
Vietnam	5	2	2	1	12	6	+6	8
Thailand (H)	5	2	2	1	13	4	+9	8
South Korea	5	1	3	1	17	7	+10	6
Myanmar	5	1	2	2	4	8	−4	5
Cambodia	5	0	0	5	2	34	−32	0

9 October 2009
16:30

South Korea	0–0	Myanmar
	Report

Thai Army Sports Stadium, Bangkok
Attendance: 130
Referee: Ryuji Sato (Japan)
9 October 2009
19:00

Thailand	8–0	Cambodia
Kasidech 1'; Khamkhong 26', 30', 33', 83'; Kittisak 44', 58'; Itthipol 60'	Report

Thai Army Sports Stadium, Bangkok
Attendance: 250
Referee: Dilovarshokh Orzuev (Tajikistan)
9 October 2009
19:00

Vietnam	1–2	North Korea
Võ Ngọc Đức 51'	Report	Jo Kwang 23'; Ju Jong-chol 85'

Thai-Japanese Stadium, Bangkok
Attendance: 100
Referee: Kakabay Seydov (Turkmenistan)

11 October 2009
16:30

Thailand	0–1	Vietnam
	Report	Nguyễn Xuân Nam 74'

Thai Army Sports Stadium, Bangkok
Attendance: 200
Referee: Yadollah Jahanbazi (Iran)
11 October 2009
19:00

North Korea	5–1	Myanmar
Jo Kwang 6', 84'; Ri Kwang-il 35'; Pak Myong-song 53'; Kang Nam-gwon 62'	Report	Nyi Nyi Min 41'

Thai Army Sports Stadium, Bangkok
Attendance: 200
Referee: Wan Daxue (China)
11 October 2009
19:00

Cambodia	0–11	South Korea
	Report	Hwang Sin-young 18', 45+2', 47'; Bang Chan-jun 24'; Park Jung-bin 34', 45'; Kwon Chang-hoon 43'; Kang Tae-woong 46', 83'; Rotha 57' (o.g.); Oh Joun-houk 77'

Thai-Japanese Stadium, Bangkok
Attendance: 100
Referee: Nami Sato (Japan)

14 October 2009
16:30

Cambodia	1–7	Vietnam
Vathanaka 67'	Report	Nguyễn Văn Núi 7', 21'; Nguyễn Anh Phong 24', 75'; Đặng Anh Tuấn 58'; Nguyễn Công Danh 68'; Lương Văn Hoàng 89'

Thai Army Sports Stadium, Bangkok
Attendance: 75
Referee: Kakabay Seydov (Turkmenistan)
14 October 2009
19:00

South Korea	1–2	North Korea
Park Jung-bin 13'	Report	Jo Kwang 29', 71'

Thai Army Sports Stadium, Bangkok
Attendance: 150
Referee: Ryuji Sato (Japan)
14 October 2009
19:00

Myanmar	0–2	Thailand
	Report	Kasidech 4'; Kittisak 52'

Thai-Japanese Stadium, Bangkok
Attendance: 300
Referee: Kao Tsai-Hu (Chinese Taipei)

16 October 2009
16:30

North Korea	1–1	Thailand
Jang Ok-chol 83'	Report	Khamkhong 89' (pen.)

Thai Army Sports Stadium, Bangkok
Attendance: 350
Referee: Wan Daxue (China)
16 October 2009
19:00

Myanmar	3–1	Cambodia
Htet Wai Phyo 11', 52'; Aung Myo Htwe 49'	Report	Rina 72'

Thai Army Sports Stadium, Bangkok
Attendance: 100
Referee: Nami Sato (Japan)
16 October 2009
19:00

Vietnam	3–3	South Korea
Nguyễn Hạ Long 35'; Nguyễn Xuân Nam 54', 63'	Report	Hwang Sin-young 19'; Jeong Hog-yun 78'; Kang Tae-woong 80'

Thai-Japanese Stadium, Bangkok
Attendance: 150
Referee: Yadollah Jahanbazi (Iran)

19 October 2009
16:30

South Korea	2–2	Thailand
Kim Seung-jun 6'; Kwon Chang-hoon 82'	Report	Aekkaphop 63'; Suban 72'

Thai Army Sports Stadium, Bangkok
Attendance: 1,200
Referee: Kao Tsai-Hu (Chinese Taipei)
19 October 2009
19:00

Myanmar	0–0	Vietnam
	Report

Thai Army Sports Stadium, Bangkok
Attendance: 650
Referee: Dilovarshokh Orzuev (Tajikistan)
19 October 2009
19:00

Cambodia	0–5	North Korea
	Report	Jang Ok-chol 2'; Jo Kwang 45', 49'; Ri Ji-song 61', 90+2'

Thai-Japanese Stadium, Bangkok
Attendance: 50
Referee: Yadollah Jahanbazi (Iran)

== Group H ==
All matches will be held in Canberra, Australia (UTC+10).

Team	Pld	W	D	L	GF	GA	GD	Pts
Australia (H)	4	3	1	0	17	3	+14	10
Laos	4	1	1	2	10	17	−7	4
Malaysia	4	0	2	2	7	14	−7	2

6 October 2009
19:00

Australia	7–0	Laos
Monaco 26', 44'; Paterson 42'; Morton 49'; Makarounas 73'; Da Silva 77'; Perkatis 80'	Report

McKellar Park, Canberra
Attendance: 300
Referee: Pandian Palaniyandi (Singapore)

8 October 2009
19:00

Malaysia	0–6	Laos
	Report	Khanthavong 10'; Saysana 19', 40', 73'; Chanchaleune 45+3'; Sayalath 86'

McKellar Park, Canberra
Attendance: 200
Referee: Hajime Matsuo (Japan)

10 October 2009
19:00

Australia	2–2	Malaysia
Ilic 12'; Gallifuoco 71'	Report	Syazwan 75'; Faiz 85'

McKellar Park, Canberra
Attendance: 300
Referee: Ng Chiu Kok (Hong Kong)

12 October 2009
19:00

Laos	0–6	Australia
	Report	Gallifuoco 29'; Makarounas 45'; Morton 70'; Chapman 76'; Ilic 80', 90'

McKellar Park, Canberra
Attendance: 300
Referee: Hajime Matsuo (Japan)

14 October 2009
19:00

Laos	4–4	Malaysia
Saysana 16', 66'; Abdunloh 30' (o.g.); Sihavong 70' (pen.)	Report	Tajudin 32', 50'; Bahari 40' (pen.); Ishak 63'

McKellar Park, Canberra
Attendance: 100
Referee: Ng Chiu Kok (Hong Kong)

16 October 2009
19:00

Malaysia	1–2	Australia
Ishak 44'	Report	Makarounas 9'; Degenek 33'

McKellar Park, Canberra
Attendance: 300
Referee: Pandian Palaniyandi (Singapore)

== Third-placed qualifiers ==
At the end of the first stage, a comparison was made between the third placed teams from the seven groups of six teams. The one best third-placed teams advanced to the 2010 AFC U-16 Championship.

Because three group has one team fewer than the others, following the withdrawal of Sri Lanka, Mongolia and Maldives, matches against the sixth-placed team in each group are not included in this ranking. As a result, four matches played by each team will count for the purposes of the third-placed table.

Group	Team	Pld	W	D	L	GF	GA	GD	Pts
D	Oman	4	2	1	1	6	3	+3	7
A	Saudi Arabia	4	2	1	1	3	1	+2	7
B	Bahrain	4	2	0	2	7	5	+2	6
C	Yemen	4	2	0	2	5	3	+2	6
E	Chinese Taipei	4	2	0	2	6	8	−2	6
G	Thailand	4	1	2	1	5	4	+1	5
F	Hong Kong	4	1	1	2	4	12	−8	4

== Qualifiers ==
- Australia
- China
- Indonesia
- Iran
- Iraq
- Japan
- Jordan
- North Korea
- Kuwait
- Oman
- Syria
- Tajikistan
- Timor-Leste
- United Arab Emirates
- Uzbekistan
- Vietnam

== See also ==
- 2010 AFC U-19 Championship qualification
