= 2010 AFC U-16 Championship =

2010 yilgi U-16 Osiyo chempionati

Tournament details
- Host country: Uzbekistan
- Dates: 24 October – 7 November
- Teams: 16 (from 1 confederation)
- Venues: 2 (in 1 host city)

Final positions
- Champions: North Korea (1st title)
- Runners-up: Uzbekistan

Tournament statistics
- Matches played: 31
- Goals scored: 91 (2.94 per match)
- Attendance: 218,750 (7,056 per match)
- Top scorer(s): (Japan) Takumi Minamino (Uzbekistan) Timur Khakimov (5 goals)
- Best player: (Uzbekistan) Timur Khakimov

The 2010 AFC U-16 Championship was the 14th edition of the tournament organized by the Asian Football Confederation. The top 4 teams qualified for the 2011 FIFA U-17 World Cup, hosted by Mexico.

Oman, Iran, Jordan and Australia expressed an interest in hosting the tournament, but it was once again awarded to Uzbekistan for the 2nd edition running. Qualification for the tournament started in 2009.

== Venues ==
Tashkent
Pakhtakor Stadium	JAR Stadium
Capacity: 35,000	Capacity: 8,460

== Qualification ==
=== Qualifiers ===
- Australia
- China
- Indonesia
- Iran
- Iraq
- Japan
- Jordan
- North Korea
- Kuwait
- Oman
- Syria
- Tajikistan
- Timor-Leste
- United Arab Emirates
- Uzbekistan
- Vietnam

== Draw ==
The draw for the AFC U-16 Championship 2010 was held on 20 May 2010 in Tashkent, Uzbekistan.

Pot 1 (Host & Seeds)	Pot 2	Pot 3	Pot 4
Uzbekistan; Iran; Japan; United Arab Emirates	Australia; Syria; China; Indonesia	Kuwait; Oman; Vietnam; Jordan	North Korea; Iraq; Tajikistan; Timor-Leste

== Group stage ==
All times are Uzbekistan Time (UZT)–UTC+5.

=== Group A ===
Pos	Team	Pld	W	D	L	GF	GA	GD	Pts	Qualification
1	Uzbekistan (H)	3	2	1	0	11	1	+10	7	Knockout stage
2	Jordan	3	1	2	0	2	1	+1	5	Knockout stage
3	Indonesia	3	1	0	2	4	5	−1	3	
4	Tajikistan	3	0	1	2	3	13	−10	1	

Source: AFC
Rules for classification: Group stage tiebreakers
(H) Hosts
24 October 2010
15:00

Uzbekistan	3–0	Indonesia
T. Khakimov 31', 47'; Sabirkhodjaev 60'	Report

Pakhtakor Stadium, Tashkent
Attendance: 16,500
Referee: Alireza Faghani (Iran)
24 October 2010
19:00

Tajikistan	1–1	Jordan
Sultonov 62'	Report	Al-Bashtawi 74'

Pakhtakor Stadium, Tashkent
Attendance: 300
Referee: (South Korea) Lee Min-Hu

26 October 2010
19:00

Indonesia	4–1	Tajikistan
Fakhri 11'; Nugroho 47', 59'; Angga 70'	Report	Saidov 85'

Pakhtakor Stadium, Tashkent
Attendance: 1,300
Referee: (Kuwait) Yousef Al-Marzouq
26 October 2010
15:00

Jordan	0–0	Uzbekistan
	Report

Pakhtakor Stadium, Tashkent
Attendance: 10,500
Referee: Nawaf Shukralla (Bahrain)

28 October 2010
13:00

Uzbekistan	8–1	Tajikistan
T. Khakimov 2', 25'; Mirabdullaev 19'; Makhstaliev 39'; J. Khakimov 75', 90+2'; Kamolov 80' (pen.); Murodov 88' (pen.)	Report	Muhtojzoda 59'

Pakhtakor Stadium, Tashkent
Attendance: 22,000
Referee: Alireza Faghani (Iran)
28 October 2010
13:00

Jordan	1–0	Indonesia
Al-Hasani 70'	Report

JAR Stadium, Tashkent
Attendance: 3,000
Referee: (Thailand) Apisit Aonrak

=== Group B ===
Pos	Team	Pld	W	D	L	GF	GA	GD	Pts	Qualification
1	North Korea	3	2	1	0	5	2	+3	7	Knockout stage
2	Syria	3	1	2	0	3	2	+1	5	Knockout stage
3	Iran	3	1	1	1	6	4	+2	4	
4	Oman	3	0	0	3	2	8	−6	0	

Source: AFC
Rules for classification: Group stage tiebreakers
24 October 2010
17:00

Iran	5–1	Oman
Fathian 26', 59'; Mehdipour 45+2'; Azmoun 48'; Nazari 72'	Report	Al-Habsi 84'

JAR Stadium, Tashkent
Attendance: 3,000
Referee: Kenji Ogiya (Japan)
24 October 2010
13:00

Syria	1–1	North Korea
Khribin 5'	Report	Ri Kwang-il 60'

JAR Stadium, Tashkent
Attendance: 3,700
Referee: Nawaf Shukralla (Bahrain)

26 October 2010
13:00

Syria	1–0	Oman
Omr 90'	Report

JAR Stadium, Tashkent
Attendance: 7,000
Referee: Dmitriy Mashentsev (Kyrgyzstan)
26 October 2010
17:00

North Korea	2–0	Iran
Kang Nam-gwon 22'; Jong Kwang-sok 32'	Report

JAR Stadium, Tashkent
Attendance: 2,000
Referee: Fan Qi (China)

28 October 2010
17:00

Iran	1–1	Syria
Nazari 6'	Report	Taki 79'

Pakhtakor Stadium, Tashkent
Attendance: 1,500
Referee: Nawaf Shukralla (Bahrain)
28 October 2010
17:00

Oman	1–2	North Korea
Al-Riyami 90+3'	Report	Jang Ok-chol 24', 67'

JAR Stadium, Tashkent
Attendance: 3,500
Referee: Yousef Al-Marzouq (Kuwait)

=== Group C ===
Pos	Team	Pld	W	D	L	GF	GA	GD	Pts	Qualification
1	Australia	3	2	1	0	8	1	+7	7	Knockout stage
2	Japan	3	2	1	0	7	0	+7	7	Knockout stage
3	Vietnam	3	1	0	2	4	10	−6	3	
4	Timor-Leste	3	0	0	3	1	9	−8	0	

Source: AFC
Rules for classification: Group stage tiebreakers
25 October 2010
15:00

Japan	6–0	Vietnam
Ueda 16'; Minamino 19', 66'; Kanda 35'; Hayakawa 47'; Ishige 90'	Report

Pakhtakor Stadium, Tashkent
Attendance: 7,000
Referee: (Thailand) Apisit Aonrak
25 October 2010
19:00

Australia	5–0	Timor-Leste
Makarounas 14', 20'; Remington 34', 79'; Woodcock 90+2'	Report

Pakhtakor Stadium, Tashkent
Attendance: 2,000
Referee: (Uzbekistan) Vladislav Tseytlin

27 October 2010
19:00

Vietnam	1–3	Australia
Nguyễn Xuân Nam 49'	Report	Makarounas 60' (pen.), 90+5' (pen.); Chapman 90+2'

Pakhtakor Stadium, Tashkent
Attendance: 3,700
Referee: (Qatar) Abdullah Balideh
27 October 2010
15:00

Timor-Leste	0–1	Japan
	Report	Minamino 87'

Pakhtakor Stadium, Tashkent
Attendance: 2,000
Referee: (Jordan) Mohammad Abu Loum

29 October 2010
13:00

Japan	0–0	Australia
	Report

Pakhtakor Stadium, Tashkent
Attendance: 5,500
Referee: (South Korea) Lee Min-Hu
29 October 2010
13:00

Timor-Leste	1–3	Vietnam
RIcky 62'	Report	Nguyễn Văn Núi 87'; Nguyễn Viết Thắng 50' (pen.) 65'

JAR Stadium, Tashkent
Attendance: 2,300
Referee: (China) Fan Qi

=== Group D ===
Pos	Team	Pld	W	D	L	GF	GA	GD	Pts	Qualification
1	Iraq	3	2	0	1	6	2	+4	6	Knockout stage
2	United Arab Emirates	3	1	2	0	3	2	+1	5	Knockout stage
3	Kuwait	3	1	1	1	1	3	−2	4	
4	China	3	0	1	2	1	4	−3	1	

Source: AFC
Rules for classification: Group stage tiebreakers
25 October 2010
17:00

United Arab Emirates	0–0	Kuwait
	Report

JAR Stadium, Tashkent
Attendance: 3,750
Referee: (Jordan) Mohammad Abu Loum
25 October 2010
13:00

Iraq	2–0	China
Fandi 5'; Al-Fuadi 39' (pen.)	Report

JAR Stadium, Tashkent
Attendance: 4,700
Referee: (Qatar) Abdullah Balideh

27 October 2010
13:00

Kuwait	0–3	Iraq
	Report	Ismail 15'; Hussein 32'; Al-Fuadi 64'

JAR Stadium, Tashkent
Attendance: 7,500
Referee: (South Korea) Lee Min-Hu
27 October 2010
17:00

China	1–1	United Arab Emirates
D. L. Zheng 75'	Report	Al-Hammadi 74'

JAR Stadium, Tashkent
Attendance: 2,000
Referee: (Japan) Kenji Ogiya

29 October 2010
17:00

United Arab Emirates	2–1	Iraq
Amber 55'; Saeed 74'	Report	Fandi 27'

Pakhtakor Stadium, Tashkent
Attendance: 1,500
Referee: (Kyrgyzstan) Dmitriy Mashentsev
29 October 2010
17:00

China	0–1	Kuwait
	Report	Al-Enezi 73'

JAR Stadium, Tashkent
Attendance: 1,500
Referee: (Uzbekistan) Vladislav Tseytlin

== Knockout stage ==
=== Bracket ===
Quarter-finals
1 November – Tashkent
Uzbekistan	2
Syria	1
1 November – Tashkent
Australia	3
United Arab Emirates	2
1 November – Tashkent
North Korea	4
Jordan	0
1 November – Tashkent
Iraq	1
Japan	3

Semi-finals
4 November – Tashkent
Uzbekistan	2
Australia	1
4 November – Tashkent
North Korea	2
Japan	1

Final
7 November – Tashkent
Uzbekistan	0
North Korea	2

=== Quarter-finals ===
1 November 2010
13:00

Australia	3–2 (a.e.t.)	United Arab Emirates
Brown 82'; Gallifuoco 90+4', 99'	Report	Saeed 18'; Moosa 45'

JAR Stadium, Tashkent
Attendance: 3,500
Referee: Kenji Ogiya (Japan)

1 November 2010
15:00

Uzbekistan	2–1	Syria
Makhstaliev 37'; T. Khakimov 82'	Report	Nabhan 50'

Pakhtakor Stadium, Tashkent
Attendance: 22,000
Referee: (South Korea) Lee Min-Hu

1 November 2010
17:00

Iraq	1–3	Japan
Al-Fuadi 18'	Report	Minamino 13', 75'; Akino 54'

JAR Stadium, Tashkent
Attendance: 2,000
Referee: Nawaf Shukralla (Bahrain)

1 November 2010
19:00

North Korea	4–0	Jordan
Jo Kwang 32', 64', 78'; Ju Jong-chol 71'	Report

Pakhtakor Stadium, Tashkent
Attendance: 3,500
Referee: Alireza Faghani (Iran)

=== Semi-finals ===
4 November 2010
14:00

Uzbekistan	2–1	Australia
Makhstaliev 17', 90'	Report	Woodcock 43'

Pakhtakor Stadium, Tashkent
Attendance: 30,000
Referee: Nawaf Shukralla (Bahrain)

4 November 2010
17:30

North Korea	2–1	Japan
Ju Jong-chol 4'; Pak Myong-song 12'	Report	Matsumoto 60'

Pakhtakor Stadium, Tashkent
Attendance: 5,000
Referee: Abdullah Balideh (Qatar)

=== Final ===
7 November 2010
14:00

Uzbekistan	0–2	North Korea
	Report	Ri Kwang-il 75'; Jo Kwang 85'

Pakhtakor Stadium, Tashkent
Attendance: 35,000
Referee: Alireza Faghani (Iran)

== Winners ==
2010 AFC U-16 Championship winners

North Korea
First title

== Countries to participate in 2011 FIFA U-17 World Cup ==
The four semi-finalists qualified for 2011 FIFA U-17 World Cup.

- Australia
- Japan
- North Korea
- Uzbekistan

== Goalscorers ==
There were 91 goals scored in 31 matches, for an average of 2.94 goals per match.

5 goals

- (Japan) Takumi Minamino
- (Uzbekistan) Timur Khakimov

4 goals

- (Australia) Jesse Makarounas
- (North Korea) Jo Kwang
- (Uzbekistan) Abbosbek Makhstaliev

3 goals

- (Iraq) Hussein Al-Fuadi

2 goals

- (Australia) Giancarlo Gallifuoco
- (Australia) Luke Remington
- (Australia) Riley Woodcock
- (Indonesia) Antony Nugroho
- (Iran) Ali Fathian
- (Iran) Siavash Hagh Nazari
- (Iraq) Ali Hussein Fandi
- (North Korea) Jang Ok Chol
- (North Korea) Ju Jong-chol
- (North Korea) Ri Kwang-il
- (United Arab Emirates) Yousif Saeed
- (Uzbekistan) Jasurbek Khakimov
- (Vietnam) Nguyễn Viết Thắng

1 goal

- (Australia) Corey Brown
- (Australia) Connor Chapman
- (China) Zheng Dalun
- (Indonesia) Angga Febryanto Putra
- (Indonesia) Fakhri Rasyid
- (Iran) Sardar Azmoun
- (Iran) Mehdi Mehdipour
- (Iraq) Rasool Hussein
- (Iraq) Dhurgham Ismail
- (Japan) Hiroki Akino
- (Japan) Fumiya Hayakawa
- (Japan) Hideki Ishige
- (Japan) Yumemi Kanda
- (Japan) Masaya Matsumoto
- (Japan) Naomichi Ueda
- (Jordan) Laith Al-Bashtawi
- (Jordan) Omar Khalil Al-Hasani
- (Kuwait) Nader Al-Enezi
- (North Korea) Jong Kwak Sok
- (North Korea) Kang Nam Gwon
- (North Korea) Pak Myong-song
- (Oman) Mohammed Said Al-Habsi
- (Oman) Abdul Rahman Al-Riyami
- (Syria) Adnan Al-Taki
- (Syria) Omar Khribin
- (Syria) Wasim Nabhan
- (Syria) Husamuddin Omar
- (Tajikistan) Ibrohimiy Muhtojzoda
- (Tajikistan) Abdullo Saidov
- (Tajikistan) Tolib Sultonov
- (Timor-Leste) Ricky
- (United Arab Emirates) Abdulla Al-Balooshi
- (United Arab Emirates) Salah Al-Hammadi
- (United Arab Emirates) Khaled Amber
- (Uzbekistan) Nodir Kamolov
- (Uzbekistan) Javlon Mirabdullaev
- (Uzbekistan) Aziz Murodov
- (Uzbekistan) Sardor Sobirkhodjaev
- (Vietnam) Nguyễn Văn Núi
- (Vietnam) Nguyễn Xuân Nam

== Broadcasters ==
Al Jazeera Sports Global, Abu Dhabi Sports, Dubai Sports . All channels are free-to-air at Hot Bird.
