= Laith Al-Bashtawi =

Jordanian footballer

Personal information
- Full name: Laith Subhi Drzi Al-Bashtawi
- Date of birth: 12 March 1994 (age 32)
- Place of birth: Irbid, Jordan
- Height: 1.84 m (6 ft 0 in)
- Position: Forward

Team information
- Current team: Al-Jalil
- Number: 8

Youth career
- 2006–2012: Al-Wehdat

Senior career*
Years	Team	Apps	(Gls)
2012–2017	Al-Wehdat		
2017	→ Al-Ahli (loan)		
2018–2019	Shabab Al-Ordon		
2019–2021	Al-Hussein		
2021–	Al-Jalil		

International career^{‡}
2009–2010	Jordan U16		(7)
2011–2012	Jordan U19		(6)
2013–2016	Jordan U23		(6)
- * Club domestic league appearances and goals ‡ National team caps and goals as of 23 January 2016

Laith Subhi Drzi Al-Bashtawi (Arabic: ليث صبحي درزي البشتاوي) is a Jordanian footballer who plays for Al-Jalil.

== International goals ==
=== With U-16 ===
#	Date	Venue	Opponent	Score	Result	Competition
1	15 August 2009	Amman	Palestine	1-1	Draw	2009 WAFF U-15 Championship
2	18 August 2009	Amman	Iraq	3-1	Loss	2009 WAFF U-15 Championship
3	3 October 2009	Al Ain	India	6-1	Win	2010 AFC U-16 Championship qualification
4	3 October 2009	Al Ain	India	6-1	Win	2010 AFC U-16 Championship qualification
5	8 October 2009	Al Ain	Turkmenistan	3-2	Win	2010 AFC U-16 Championship qualification
6	8 May 2010	Al Farwaniyah	Kuwait	3-0	Win	Friendly match
7	24 October 2010	Tashkent	Tajikistan	1-1	Draw	2010 AFC U-16 Championship

=== With U-19 ===
#	Date	Venue	Opponent	Score	Result	Competition
1	October 30, 2011	Doha	Bhutan	4-0	Win	2012 AFC U-19 Championship qualification
2	October 30, 2011	Doha	Bhutan	4-0	Win	2012 AFC U-19 Championship qualification
3	November 1, 2011	Doha	Tajikistan	4-1	Win	2012 AFC U-19 Championship qualification
4	November 1, 2011	Doha	Tajikistan	4-1	Win	2012 AFC U-19 Championship qualification
5	4 July 2012	Amman	Saudi Arabia	1-1	Draw	2012 Arab Cup U-20
6	8 November 2012	Fujairah	Vietnam	5-2	Win	2012 AFC U-19 Championship

=== With U-23 ===
#	Date	Venue	Opponent	Score	Result	Competition
1	14 August 2013	Sidon	Lebanon	2-0	Win	U-23 Friendly
2	30 August 2014	Amman	Uzbekistan	2-1	Win	U-23 Friendly
3	22 September 2014	Incheon	India	2-0	Win	2014 Asian Games
4	6 March 2015	Sharjah	North Korea	2-2	Draw	U-23 Friendly
5	16 May 2015	Al Ain	Pakistan	5-0	Win	2016 AFC U-23 Championship qualification
6	16 May 2015	Al Ain	Pakistan	5-0	Win	2016 AFC U-23 Championship qualification
