= Võ Ngọc Toàn =

Vietnamese footballer

Personal information
- Full name: Võ Ngọc Toàn
- Date of birth: 20 October 1994 (age 32)
- Place of birth: Quỳnh Lưu, Nghệ An, Vietnam
- Height: 1.71 m (5 ft 7 in)
- Position: Midfielder

Team information
- Current team: SHB Đà Nẵng
- Number: 8

Youth career
- 2012–2015: Sông Lam Nghệ An

Senior career*
Years	Team	Apps	(Gls)
2015–2019	Sông Lam Nghệ An	87	(2)
2020–	SHB Đà Nẵng	59	(0)
- * Club domestic league appearances and goals as of 21 July 2018

Võ Ngọc Toàn (born 20 October 1994) is a Vietnamese footballer who plays as a midfielder for V.League 1 club SHB Đà Nẵng.

Ngọc Toàn is the twin brother of Võ Ngọc Đức, who is also a professional footballer.

== Honours ==
SHB Đà Nẵng

- V.League 2: 2023–24
