= Wanda Syahputra =

Indonesian footballer

Personal information
- Full name: Wanda Syahputra
- Date of birth: 9 January 1994 (age 32)
- Place of birth: Langkat, Indonesia
- Height: 1.65 m (5 ft 5 in)
- Position: Defender

Youth career
- 2009–2010: PPLP Sumut
- 2011–2012: Deportivo Indonesia

Senior career*
Years	Team	Apps	(Gls)
2012–2013	PSMS Medan	43	(3)
2014	PS Mojokerto Putra	12	(0)
2015–2018	PSMS Medan	14	(0)
2016–2017	→ PS TNI (loan)	26	(0)
2019	Bandung United	2	(0)

International career
2009–2010	Indonesia U16	7	(0)
2011–2012	Indonesia U19	3	(0)
- * Club domestic league appearances and goals as of 2 Juni 2020

Wanda Syahputra (born 9 January 1994) is an Indonesian former footballer who last played as a defender for Liga 3 club Bandung United and Indonesia's youth teams.

== International career ==
In 2010, Wanda represented the Indonesia U-16, in the 2010 AFC U-16 Championship.

== Honours ==
=== Club ===
PSMS Medan

- Liga 2 runner-up: 2017
