= Nur Ridho =

Singaporean footballer

Personal information
- Full name: Muhammad Nur Ridho Bin Ahmad Jafri
- Date of birth: 18 August 1994 (age 32)
- Place of birth: Singapore
- Position: Midfielder

Senior career*
| Years | Team | Apps | (Gls) |
| -2013 | Young Lions FC | 17 | (0) |
| 2016 | Hougang United FC | 10 | (0) |
| 2017-2018 | Yishun Sentek Mariners FC | | |
- * Club domestic league appearances and goals

Muhammad Nur Ridho Bin Ahmad Jafri (born 18 August 1994) is a Singaporean former professional footballer.

== Career ==
As a child, Ridho's parents took away his football shoes so he would focus on school, but his grandmother gave him money to buy new ones.

After playing for Singapore's under-21 national team, Ridho played professionally for Young Lions and Hougang United in the S.League before joining Yishun Sentek Mariners in the second division.
