= Omar Khalil Al-Hasani =

Jordanian footballer

Omar Khalil
Personal information
- Full name: Omar Khalil Ismaeel Al-Hasani
- Date of birth: 4 February 1994 (age 32)
- Place of birth: Saudi Arabia
- Position: Attacking midfielder

Team information
- Current team: Al-Salt

Youth career
- 2007–2012: Al-Jazeera

Senior career*
Years	Team	Apps	(Gls)
2012–2018	Al-Jazeera		(2)
2014–2018	Al-Ta'ee		(2)
2018–2020	Al-Salt		

International career
2009–2010	Jordan U-17		(1)
2011–2012	Jordan U-19		
2013–2016	Jordan U-23		
- * Club domestic league appearances and goals

Omar Khalil Ismaeel Al-Hasani (Arabic: عمر خليل اسماعيل الحسني; born 4 February 1992) is a Jordanian former professional footballer who played as an attacking midfielder.

== Career statistics ==
U-17
#	Date	Venue	Opponent	Score	Result	Competition
1	28 October 2010	Tashkent	Indonesia	1–0	Win	2010 AFC U-16 Championship

Non-FIFA
#	Date	Venue	Opponent	Score	Result	Competition
1	25 December 2013	Manama	Bahrain Hidd SCC	3–2	Win	None-International Friendly
