= Tamer Soubar =

Jordanian footballer (born 1994)

Personal information
- Full name: Tamer Husni Omar Soubar
- Date of birth: 19 February 1994 (age 32)
- Place of birth: Amman, Jordan
- Position: Striker

Team information
- Current team: Al-Ahli
- Number: 10

Youth career
- 2008–2012: Al-Ahli
- 2012–2013: Blackburn Rovers

Senior career*
Years	Team	Apps	(Gls)
2013	Al-Ahli		
2013	→ Shabab Al-Ordon (loan)		
2015–2016	Al-Jazeera		
2016–	Al-Ahli		

International career
2009–2010	Jordan U-17		(13)
2012–2017	Jordan U-23		
- * Club domestic league appearances and goals

Tamer Husni Omar Soubar (Arabic: تامر حسني عمر صوبر; born in 1994) is a Jordanian footballer who plays as a striker for Al-Ahli.

== International goals ==
=== With U-17 ===
#	Date	Venue	Opponent	Score	Result	Competition
1	3 October 2009	Al Ain	India	6–1	Win	2010 AFC U-16 Championship qualification (4 Goals)
2	10 October 2009	Al Ain	Kyrgyzstan	2–1	Win	2010 AFC U-16 Championship qualification (2 Goals)
3	13 October 2009	Al Ain	Oman	1–1	Draw	2010 AFC U-16 Championship qualification
4	27 March 2010	Amman	Egypt	1–1	Draw	U-17 Friendly
5	8 May 2010	Kuwait City	Kuwait	3–0	Win	U-17 Friendly
6	29 May 2010	Amman	Iraq	9–1	Loss	U-17 Friendly
7	12 August 2010	Amman	Iran	2–2	Draw	U-17 Friendly (2 Goals)
8	31 August 2010	Al Ain	Egypt	5–1	Loss	U-17 Friendly
