= Nadhir Awadh =

Omani footballer (born 1994)

Nadir Awadh
Personal information
- Full name: Nadir Awadh Bashir Bait Mabrook
- Date of birth: 5 December 1994 (age 31)
- Place of birth: Salalah, Oman
- Height: 1.80 m (5 ft 11 in)
- Position: Defender

Team information
- Current team: Al-Nasr

Senior career*
Years	Team	Apps	(Gls)
2012–2019	Dhofar Club	?	(?)
2017–2019	→ Al-Shahania (loan)	?	(?)
2019–	Al-Nasr		

International career^{‡}
2016–	Oman	8	(1)
- * Club domestic league appearances and goals as of 10 September 2017 ‡ National team caps and goals as of 10 September 2017

Nadir Awadh Mabrook (Arabic: نادر عوض; born 5 December 1994), is an Omani footballer who plays for Al-Nasr and Oman national team.
