= 2016 Albirex Niigata season =

Albirex Niigata
2016 season
- Manager: Tatsuma Yoshida; Koichiro Katafuchi
- Stadium: Denka Big Swan Stadium
- J1 League: 15th

2016 Albirex Niigata season.

== J1 League ==
=== League table ===
Pos	Team	Pld	W	D	L	GF	GA	GD	Pts	Qualification or relegation
14	Ventforet Kofu	34	7	10	17	32	58	−26	31	
15	Albirex Niigata	34	8	6	20	33	49	−16	30	
16	Nagoya Grampus (R)	34	7	9	18	38	58	−20	30	Relegation to 2017 J2 League

Source: Meiji Yasuda J1 League
Rules for classification: 1) Points; 2) Goal difference; 3) Goals scored.
(R) Relegated

=== Match details ===
J1 League match details
Match	Date	Team	Score	Team	Venue	Attendance
1-1	2016.02.27	Shonan Bellmare	1-2	Albirex Niigata	Shonan BMW Stadium Hiratsuka	14,058
1-2	2016.03.05	Vissel Kobe	6-3	Albirex Niigata	Noevir Stadium Kobe	12,487
1-3	2016.03.12	Albirex Niigata	1-2	Yokohama F. Marinos	Denka Big Swan Stadium	20,771
1-4	2016.03.19	Albirex Niigata	2-2	Kashiwa Reysol	Denka Big Swan Stadium	14,627
1-5	2016.04.02	Avispa Fukuoka	0-1	Albirex Niigata	Level5 Stadium	9,479
1-6	2016.04.10	Albirex Niigata	1-2	Júbilo Iwata	Denka Big Swan Stadium	18,210
1-7	2016.04.15	Sanfrecce Hiroshima	1-0	Albirex Niigata	Edion Stadium Hiroshima	8,602
1-8	2016.04.24	Nagoya Grampus	2-1	Albirex Niigata	Paloma Mizuho Stadium	8,957
1-9	2016.04.30	Albirex Niigata	2-2	Ventforet Kofu	Denka Big Swan Stadium	17,607
1-10	2016.05.04	Kashima Antlers	2-1	Albirex Niigata	Kashima Soccer Stadium	24,805
1-11	2016.05.08	Albirex Niigata	0-0	Gamba Osaka	Denka Big Swan Stadium	27,439
1-12	2016.05.14	Urawa Reds	0-0	Albirex Niigata	Saitama Stadium 2002	33,763
1-13	2016.05.21	Albirex Niigata	0-0	Kawasaki Frontale	Denka Big Swan Stadium	18,363
1-14	2016.05.29	Vegalta Sendai	4-2	Albirex Niigata	Yurtec Stadium Sendai	15,049
1-15	2016.06.11	Albirex Niigata	1-0	Omiya Ardija	Denka Big Swan Stadium	20,381
1-16	2016.06.18	FC Tokyo	1-1	Albirex Niigata	Ajinomoto Stadium	24,793
1-17	2016.06.25	Albirex Niigata	1-0	Sagan Tosu	Denka Big Swan Stadium	19,055
2-1	2016.07.02	Kashiwa Reysol	1-0	Albirex Niigata	Hitachi Kashiwa Stadium	10,435
2-2	2016.07.09	Albirex Niigata	0-1	Shonan Bellmare	Denka Big Swan Stadium	16,410
2-3	2016.07.13	Kawasaki Frontale	3-2	Albirex Niigata	Kawasaki Todoroki Stadium	14,432
2-4	2016.07.17	Albirex Niigata	1-2	Vegalta Sendai	Denka Big Swan Stadium	19,388
2-5	2016.07.23	Omiya Ardija	1-2	Albirex Niigata	NACK5 Stadium Omiya	12,048
2-6	2016.07.30	Albirex Niigata	0-1	FC Tokyo	Denka Big Swan Stadium	23,510
2-7	2016.08.06	Albirex Niigata	1-0	Vissel Kobe	Denka Big Swan Stadium	18,467
2-8	2016.08.13	Ventforet Kofu	1-0	Albirex Niigata	Yamanashi Chuo Bank Stadium	10,135
2-9	2016.08.20	Albirex Niigata	3-0	Avispa Fukuoka	Denka Big Swan Stadium	19,805
2-10	2016.08.27	Sagan Tosu	1-0	Albirex Niigata	Best Amenity Stadium	14,208
2-11	2016.09.10	Albirex Niigata	0-1	Nagoya Grampus	Denka Big Swan Stadium	23,068
2-12	2016.09.17	Yokohama F. Marinos	3-1	Albirex Niigata	Nissan Stadium	21,107
2-13	2016.09.25	Albirex Niigata	0-2	Kashima Antlers	Denka Big Swan Stadium	26,202
2-14	2016.10.01	Júbilo Iwata	1-2	Albirex Niigata	Yamaha Stadium	10,525
2-15	2016.10.22	Albirex Niigata	1-2	Urawa Reds	Denka Big Swan Stadium	29,692
2-16	2016.10.29	Gamba Osaka	3-1	Albirex Niigata	Suita City Football Stadium	26,003
2-17	2016.11.03	Albirex Niigata	0-1	Sanfrecce Hiroshima	Denka Big Swan Stadium	27,081
