= Fumiya Hayakawa =

Japanese footballer

Fumiya Hayakawa 早川 史哉
Personal information
- Full name: Fumiya Hayakawa
- Date of birth: 12 January 1994 (age 32)
- Place of birth: Niigata, Niigata, Japan
- Height: 1.70 m (5 ft 7 in)
- Position: Defender

Team information
- Current team: Albirex Niigata
- Number: 18

Youth career
- –2005: Kobari Reo Reo SSS
- 2006–2011: Albirex Niigata

College career
Years	Team	Apps	(Gls)
2012–2015	University of Tsukuba		

Senior career*
Years	Team	Apps	(Gls)
2016	Albirex Niigata	3	(0)
2019–	Albirex Niigata	104	(3)

International career
2011	Japan U-17	5	(3)
- * Club domestic league appearances and goals as of 16 August 2026

Fumiya Hayakawa (早川 史哉, Hayakawa Fumiya; born 12 January 1994) is a Japanese footballer who plays as a defender for J2 League club Albirex Niigata.

== Club career ==
Hayakawa was born in Niigata on 12 January 1994. Already being recruited from Albirex Niigata as a youngster, he then joined University of Tsukuba for four years. After graduating from university, he joined Albirex Niigata in 2016. In February, he debuted in the opening match of the 2016 season. However, in April, he was diagnosed with leukemia. Hayakawa stopped playing and began treatment. He returned as a player in 2019.

== International career ==
In June 2011, Hayakawa was selected to play for Japan U-17 national team at the 2011 U-17 World Cup. He started in all 5 matches and scored 3 goals.

== Career statistics ==
Appearances and goals by club, season and competition
Club	Season	League			Emperor's Cup		J.League Cup		Total	
Club	Season	Division	Apps	Goals	Apps	Goals	Apps	Goals	Apps	Goals
University of Tsukuba	2012	N/A	–	–	2	0	–	–	2	0
University of Tsukuba	2013	N/A	–	–	1	0	–	–	1	0
University of Tsukuba	2014	N/A	–	–	1	0	–	–	1	0
Albirex Niigata	2016	J1 League	3	0	0	0	2	0	5	0
Albirex Niigata	2019	J2 League	8	0	0	0	0	0	8	0
Albirex Niigata	2020	J2 League	30	0	–	–	–	–	30	0
Albirex Niigata	2021	J2 League	20	1	2	0	0	0	22	1
Albirex Niigata	2022	J2 League	7	0	1	0	0	0	8	0
Albirex Niigata	2023	J1 League	1	0	0	0	2	0	3	0
Career total			69	1	7	0	4	0	80	1
