= Khaled Khamis =

Emirati footballer (born 1994)

Personal information
- Full name: Khaled Khamis Al-Meghaizwi
- Date of birth: 14 September 1994 (age 32)
- Place of birth: United Arab Emirates
- Height: 1.67 m (5 ft 5 1/2 in)
- Position: Midfielder

Youth career
- 2005–2011: Ras Al Khaima
- 2011–2013: Emirates Club

Senior career*
Years	Team	Apps	(Gls)
2013–2023	Emirates Club		
- * Club domestic league appearances and goals

Khaled Khamis (Arabic: خالد خميس; born 14 September 1994) is an Emirati footballer who plays as a midfielder.
