= Khaled Amber =

Emirati footballer (born 1994)

Personal information
- Full name: Khaled Amber Ismael Ali Al-Mazrooei
- Date of birth: 23 April 1994 (age 32)
- Place of birth: United Arab Emirates
- Height: 1.71 m (5 ft 7 1/2 in)
- Position: Midfielder

Youth career
- Emirates Club

Senior career*
Years	Team	Apps	(Gls)
2013–2022	Emirates Club	73	(2)
2022–2023	Al Urooba		
- * Club domestic league appearances and goals

Khaled Amber (Arabic:خالد عمبر) (born 23 April 1994) is an Emirati footballer who plays as a midfielder.
