= Angga Febryanto Putra =

Indonesian professional footballer (born 1995)

Angga Febryanto
Personal information
- Full name: Angga Febryanto Putra
- Date of birth: 4 February 1995 (age 31)
- Place of birth: Surabaya, Indonesia
- Height: 1.78 m (5 ft 10 in)
- Position: Forward

Youth career
- Persib Bandung
- 2011–2013: Deportivo Indonesia
- 2015–2016: Persipasi Bandung Raya
- 2016–2017: Pelita Jaya

Senior career*
Years	Team	Apps	(Gls)
2017	Persib Bandung	2	(0)
2017	PSGC Ciamis	1	(0)
2018	PS TIRA	1	(0)
2019	Madura	6	(2)
2019	Persibat Batang	4	(0)

International career^{‡}
2009–2010	Indonesia U16	7	(2)
2014	Indonesia U19	1	(0)
- * Club domestic league appearances and goals as of 17 October 2019 ‡ National team caps and goals as of 21 March 2014

Angga Febryanto Putra (born 4 February 1995) is an Indonesian former footballer who plays as a forward.

== Club career ==
=== Persib Bandung ===
He made his professional debut in the Liga 1 on 22 April 2017 against PS TNI.

== International career ==
In 2010, Angga represented the Indonesia U-16, in the 2010 AFC U-16 Championship.
