= Võ Ngọc Đức =

Vietnamese footballer

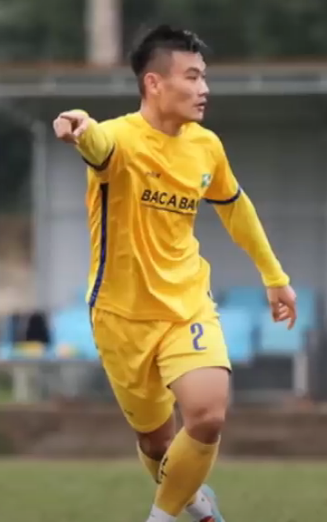
- Ngọc Đức in 2019

Personal information
- Full name: Võ Ngọc Đức
- Date of birth: 10 October 1994 (age 32)
- Place of birth: Quỳnh Lưu, Nghệ An, Vietnam
- Height: 1.70 m (5 ft 7 in)
- Position: Left-back

Team information
- Current team: Hồ Chí Minh City
- Number: 37

Youth career
- 2006–2014: Sông Lam Nghệ An

Senior career*
Years	Team	Apps	(Gls)
2015–2021	Sông Lam Nghệ An	80	(1)
2022	Bà Rịa Vũng Tàu	20	(1)
2023–	Quảng Nam	33	(0)
2025–	Hồ Chí Minh City	19	(1)
- * Club domestic league appearances and goals as of 12 September 2026

Võ Ngọc Đức (born 10 October 1994) is a Vietnamese professional footballer who plays as a left-back for V.League 2 club Hồ Chí Minh City.

Võ Ngọc Đức came through the Sông Lam Nghệ An youth system and made his first-team debut in 2014. In December 2021, he joined Bà Rịa Vũng Tàu, before joining Quảng Nam a year later.

== Personal life ==
Ngọc Đức is the twin brother of Võ Ngọc Toàn, who is also a professional footballer.

== Honours ==
Sông Lam Nghệ An

- Vietnamese Cup: 2017
- Vietnamese Super Cup runner-up: 2017

Quảng Nam

- V.League 2: 2023
