= Antoni Nugroho =

Indonesian footballer

Personal information
- Full name: Antoni Putro Nugroho
- Date of birth: 25 February 1994 (age 32)
- Place of birth: Bantul, Indonesia
- Height: 1.68 m (5 ft 6 in)
- Position: Winger

Youth career
- 2008–2010: SSB Musi Banyuasin
- 2011–2012: Deportivo Indonesia
- 2013–2014: Putra Samarinda

Senior career*
Years	Team	Apps	(Gls)
2015	Barito Putera	2	(0)
2016	Arema	7	(0)
2016–2017	Bhayangkara	30	(2)
2018	PSMS Medan	26	(1)
2019	Kalteng Putra	12	(0)
2019	PSS Sleman	4	(0)
2020–2022	Persik Kediri	32	(1)
2022–2023	Bhayangkara	20	(0)
2023–2024	RANS Nusantara	22	(0)
2024–2025	Persiku Kudus	24	(2)
2025–2026	Persiraja Banda Aceh	13	(0)
2026	PSMS Medan	8	(0)

International career
2009–2010	Indonesia U16	10	(4)
2011	Indonesia U19	4	(1)
2015	Indonesia U23	6	(0)
- * Club domestic league appearances and goals as of 19 April 2026

Antoni Putro Nugroho (born 25 February 1994) is an Indonesian professional footballer who plays as a winger.

== Club career ==
On 21 December 2015, Antoni signed a contract with Barito Putera to commence ahead of the 2015 Indonesia Super League. He made his debut on 4 April 2015 as starting line-up, which ended 2–0 victory against Persela Lamongan.

On 1 September 2016, Antoni joined Bhayangkara. On 2018, Antony joined PSMS Medan and will be the part of the team for Liga 1 2018 Season

== International career ==
In 2010, Antoni Nugroho represented the Indonesia U-16, in the 2010 AFC U-16 Championship. Antoni also scored a two goals in the group stage game as his team win 4–1 against Tajikistan U-16.

== Honours ==
=== Club ===
Bhayangkara

- Liga 1: 2017

Arema FC

- Bali Island Cup 2016
- Piala Bhayangkara 2016
