= Mohammed Said Al-Habsi =

Omani footballer (born 1994)

Mohammed Al-Habsi
Personal information
- Full name: Mohammed Said Al-Habsi
- Date of birth: 14 May 1994 (age 32)
- Place of birth: Al-Mudhaibi, Oman
- Position: Midfielder

Team information
- Current team: Muscat
- Number: 11

Youth career
- 2008–2011: Muscat

Senior career*
Years	Team	Apps	(Gls)
2011–	Muscat	?	(?)

International career
2016–	Oman	1	(0)
- * Club domestic league appearances and goals

Mohammed Said Al-Habsi (Arabic: محمد سعيد الحبسي; born 14 May 1994), commonly known as Mohammed Al-Habsi, is an Omani footballer who plays for Muscat Club in Oman Professional League.

== International career ==
Mohammed is part of the first team squad of the Oman national football team. He was selected for the national team for the first time in 2016. He made his first appearance for Oman on 24 March 2016 in a 2018 FIFA World Cup Qualification match against Guam.
