= Yousif Saeed =

Emirati footballer (born 1994)

Personal information
- Full name: Yousif Saeed Juma Mubarak Surour Al-Durs
- Date of birth: 4 September 1994 (age 32)
- Place of birth: Dubai, United Arab Emirates
- Height: 1.75 m (5 ft 9 in)
- Position: Winger

Senior career*
Years	Team	Apps	(Gls)
2010–2020	Al-Sharjah	111	(11)
2019	→ Hatta (loan)	0	(0)
2021–2022	Al Bataeh		
2022–2024	Al-Hamriyah		

International career^{‡}
2014–	United Arab Emirates	2	(0)
- * Club domestic league appearances and goals as of 12:51, 6 April 2015 (UTC) ‡ National team caps and goals as of 12:51, 6 April 2015 (UTC)

Yousif Saeed (born 4 September 1994) is an Emirati footballer who currently plays as a winger.

== Honours ==
Al Ahli

Runners-up

- UAE Division 1 Group A: 2012–13
- UAE League Cup: 2014–15
