= Lee Keng Pan =

Macanese football player (born 1990)

Keng Pan Lee
Personal information
- Date of birth: 28 February 1990 (age 36)
- Place of birth: Macau
- Height: 1.74 m (5 ft 9 in)
- Position: Forward

Team information
- Current team: Benfica de Macau
- Number: 11

Senior career*
Years	Team	Apps	(Gls)
2007–2009	MFA Development		
2010–2011	Hoi Fan	19	(11)
2012–2013	Lam Pak	27	(7)
2014	Windsor Arch Ka I	26	(7)
2016	Sporting (Macau)	15	(1)
2017–	Benfica (Macau)	54	(10)

International career^{‡}
2009–2017	Macau	12	(0)
- * Club domestic league appearances and goals as of 02:19, 13 March 2021 (UTC) ‡ National team caps and goals as of 02:19, 26 March 2017 (UTC)

Lee Keng Pan (李敬斌,born 28 February 1990) is a Macanese international footballer who plays as a forward for Benfica de Macau and the Macau national football team.

== International career ==
Lee made his international debut for Macau in 2009, a 2010 East Asian Football Championship game against the Northern Mariana Islands; playing 58 minutes before being substituted for Loi Wai Hong. After three friendly appearances in 2010, and 5 years away from the squad, Lee returned in 2015 for a friendly loss to Hong Kong.

== Career statistics ==
=== Club ===
As of 13 March 2021.

Club	Season	League			Cup		Continental		Other		Total	
Club	Season	Division	Apps	Goals	Apps	Goals	Apps	Goals	Apps	Goals	Apps	Goals
MFA Development	2009	Campeonato da 1ª Divisão do Futebol	8	3	0	0	–		0	0	8	3
Hoi Fan	2010	Campeonato da 1ª Divisão do Futebol	8	10	0	0	–		0	0	8	10
Hoi Fan	2011	Campeonato da 1ª Divisão do Futebol	11	1	0	0	–		0	0	11	1
Hoi Fan	Total		19	11	0	0	0	0	0	0	19	11
Lam Pak	2012	Campeonato da 1ª Divisão do Futebol	15	2	0	0	–		0	0	15	2
Lam Pak	2013	Campeonato da 1ª Divisão do Futebol	15	6	0	0	–		0	0	15	6
Lam Pak	Total		30	8	0	0	0	0	0	0	30	8
Windsor Arch Ka I	2014	Campeonato da 1ª Divisão do Futebol	14	4	0	0	–		0	0	14	4
Windsor Arch Ka I	2015	Campeonato da 1ª Divisão do Futebol	12	3	0	0	–		0	0	12	3
Windsor Arch Ka I	Total		26	7	0	0	0	0	0	0	26	7
Sporting (Macau)	2016	Campeonato da 1ª Divisão do Futebol	15	1	0	0	–		0	0	15	1
Benfica (Macau)]	2017	Liga de Elite	6	1	0	0	–		0	0	6	1
Benfica (Macau)]	2018	Liga de Elite	9	0	0	0	–		0	0	9	0
Benfica (Macau)]	2019	Liga de Elite	13	1	0	0	–		0	0	13	1
Benfica (Macau)]	2020	Liga de Elite	8	2	0	0	–		0	0	8	2
Benfica (Macau)]	2021	Liga de Elite	1	0	0	0	–		0	0	1	0
Benfica (Macau)]	Total		37	4	0	0	0	0	0	0	37	4
Career total			135	34	0	0	0	0	0	0	135	34

=== International ===
As of 13 March 2021.

National team	Year	Apps	Goals
Macau	2009	1	0
Macau	2010	3	0
Macau	2015	1	0
Macau	2016	5	0
Macau	2017	2	0
Total		12	0
