= 2022 Liga de Elite =

Liga de Elite
- Season: 2022
- Dates: 14 January – 4 September 2022
- Champions: Chao Pak Kei (3rd title)
- Top goalscorer: (Macau) Niki Torrão (32 goals)

The 2022 Liga de Elite was the 50th season of the Liga de Elite, the top Macanese league for association football clubs since its establishment in 1973. The competition began with the opening fixtures on 14 January 2022 and ended on 4 September 2022.

The league went ahead with just nine teams after Polícia withdrew in response to the COVID-19 pandemic in Macau. Two-time defending champions Chao Pak Kei won the title for the third time after they completed an unbeaten season, winning all 16 of their matches. As a result, Chao Pak Kei would represent Macau in the 2023–24 AFC Cup alongside runners-up Monte Carlo.

Casa de Portugal were relegated to 2ª Divisão de Macau.

== Background ==
The 2022 season would be the 50th edition of the Liga de Elite. Lam Pak were the most successful team in the league's history with nine titles but they had not won the league since 2009 and withdrew in 2014 for financial reasons.

Chao Pak Kei were two-time defending champions after winning their first two titles in the previous two seasons consecutively.

In the previous season, Hang Sai were relegated to the 2022 2ª Divisão de Macau. Sun City, champions of the 2021 2ª Divisão de Macau were not promoted. Instead, runners-up CFB Macau were promoted.

Polícia withdrew from the league to focus on the COVID-19 pandemic in Macau.

== Format ==
The competition was played as a double round robin among the nine teams. Every team would play each other twice for a total of 16 matches. Three points were awarded for a win, one for a draw and none for a loss. Teams would be ranked by the total number of points and any ties would be decided according to the head-to-head results of the teams involved. The league winners and runners-up would qualify for the 2023–24 AFC Cup group stage and qualifying play-offs respectively. The teams finishing in ninth and 10th would be relegated to 2ª Divisão de Macau.

The season began on 14 January 2022 and concluded on 4 September 2022.

== League table ==
Pos	Team	Pld	W	D	L	GF	GA	GD	Pts	Qualification or relegation
1	Chao Pak Kei	16	16	0	0	95	4	+91	48	Qualification for AFC Cup group stage
2	Monte Carlo	16	13	0	3	83	15	+68	39	Qualification for AFC Cup qualifying play–offs
3	Benfica de Macau	16	11	2	3	54	13	+41	35	
4	Cheng Fung	16	8	1	7	40	25	+15	25	
5	Ka I	16	5	3	8	25	48	−23	18	
6	Lun Lok	16	5	3	8	19	45	−26	18	
7	CFB Macau	16	3	5	8	13	63	−50	14	
8	Sporting de Macau	16	1	5	10	9	45	−36	8	
9	Casa de Portugal	16	0	1	15	6	86	−80	1	Relegation to 2ª Divisão de Macau
10	Polícia	0	0	0	0	0	0	0	0	Withdrew

Rules for classification: 1) points; 2) goal difference; 3) number of goals scored.

== Results ==
Home \ Away	BEN	CDP	CPK	CHF	CFB	KAI	LUL	MCL	SPO
Benfica de Macau		6–0	0–3	0–0	7–0	5–0	4–0	2–4	2–0
Casa de Portugal	0–9		0–13	1–6	1–2	0–6	1–3	0–6	1–2
Chao Pak Kei	2–1	9–0		1–0	11–0	4–0	4–0	3–2	3–0
Cheng Fung	1–3	4–0	1–3		5–0	6–2	3–1	0–4	3–1
CFB Macau	1–1	2–1	0–10	0–4		3–0	2–2	0–8	1–1
Ka I	0–4	6–0	0–8	1–0	0–0		5–1	0–9	1–1
Lun Lok	0–5	3–0	0–9	4–3	1–0	1–1		1–3	1–0
Monte Carlo	1–2	9–1	0–3	4–1	9–0	5–1	5–1		7–0
Sporting de Macau	1–3	0–0	0–9	0–3	2–2	1–2	0–0	0–7	

Legend: Blue = home team win; Yellow = draw; Red = away team win.
For upcoming matches, an "a" indicates there is an article about the rivalry between the two participants.

== See also ==
- 2022 Taça de Macau
