= Niki Torrão =

Macanese footballer (born 1987)

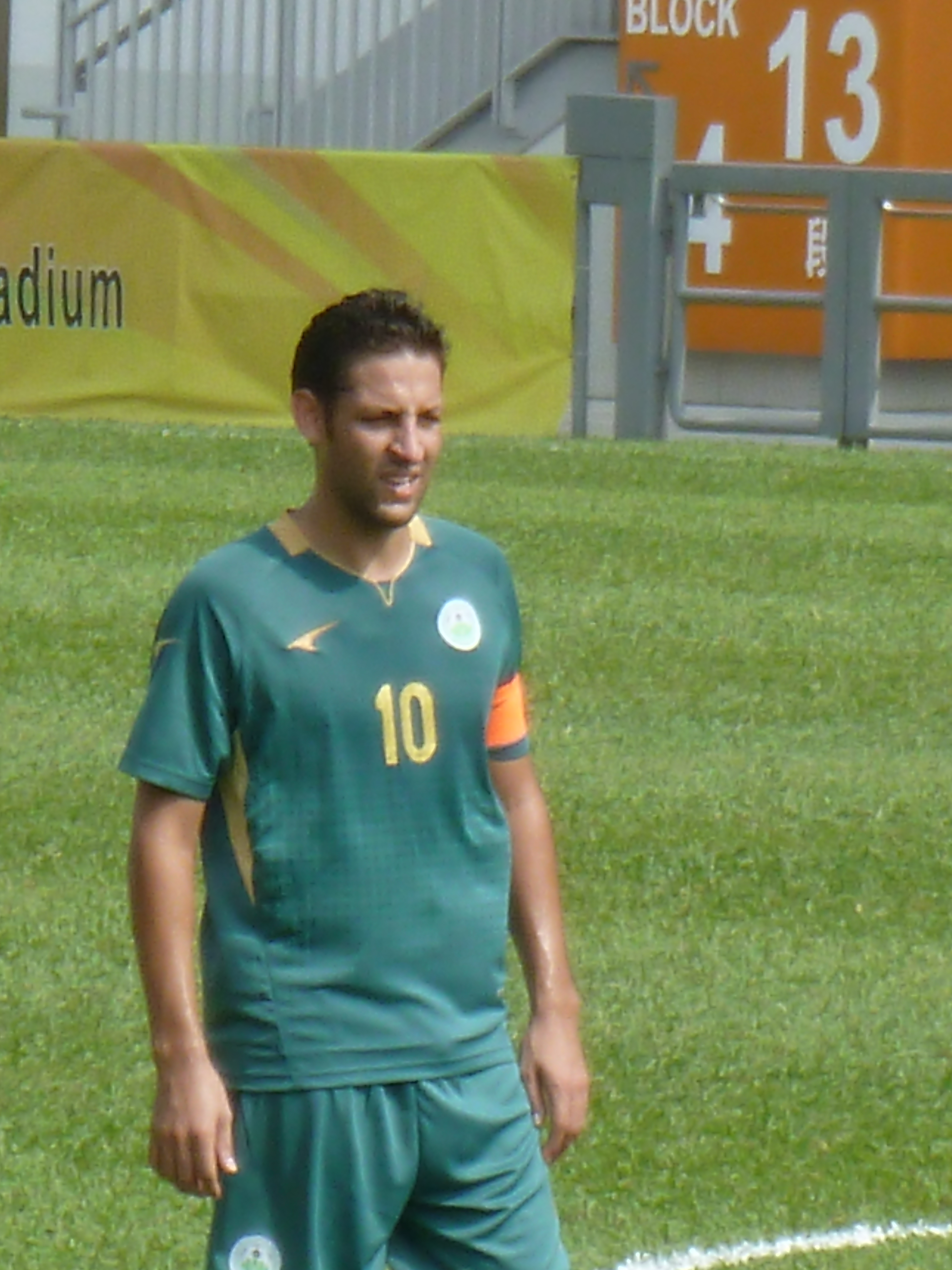
- Torrão with Macau in 2013

Personal information
- Full name: Nicholas Mário Torrão de Almeida
- Date of birth: 18 November 1987 (age 38)
- Place of birth: Johannesburg, South Africa
- Height: 1.80 m (5 ft 11 in)
- Position: Forward

Team information
- Current team: Benfica Macau
- Number: 10

Youth career
- 2003–2006: Estrela Amadora

Senior career*
Years	Team	Apps	(Gls)
2005–2007	Casa Pia		
2007–2008	Igreja Nova		
2008–2009	Atlético Cacém	12	(1)
2009–2010	Cheleirense		
2010–2011	Bocal		
2011–2013	Windsor Arch Ka I	41	(45)
2014–2019	Benfica de Macau	88	(82)
2020–2021	Sporting de Macau	8	(5)
2021–2024	MUST CPK	55	(84)
2025–	Benfica de Macau	27	(19)

International career
2011–2024	Macau	21	(9)
- * Club domestic league appearances and goals

Nicholas Mário Torrão de Almeida (Chinese: 艾美達; born 18 November 1987), simply known as Niki Torrão, is a professional footballer who plays as a forward for Liga de Elite club S.L Benfica de Macau. Born in South Africa, he represented the Macau national team.

== International career ==
In 2011, Torrão scored the winning goal for Macau in the 67th Interport Cup against Hong Kong's under-21 team.

On 11 October 2017, Torrão equalised for Macau against India at Sree Kanteerava Stadium eight minutes before half-time in a 2019 AFC Asian Cup qualification third round match. It was Macau's first ever goal in the final round of the qualifiers.

On 5 September 2024, Torrão announced the end of his international career for Macau due to nationality issues raised by the AFC and FIFA.

== Career statistics ==
=== Club ===
Club	Season	League			Cup		Continental		Total	
Club	Season	Division	Apps	Goals	Apps	Goals	Apps	Goals	Apps	Goals
Atlético Cacém	2008–09	III Divisão	12	1	0	0	0	0	12	1
Windsor Arch Ka I	2011	Liga de Elite	10	8	7	3	0	0	17	11
Windsor Arch Ka I	2012	Liga de Elite	16	14	7	3	0	0	23	17
Windsor Arch Ka I	2013	Liga de Elite	18	23	7	6	0	0	25	29
Windsor Arch Ka I	Total		44	45	21	12	0	0	65	57
Benfica de Macau	2014	Liga de Elite	13	7	9	2	0	0	22	9
Benfica de Macau	2015	Liga de Elite	15	8	7	3	0	0	22	11
Benfica de Macau	2016	Liga de Elite	15	14	6	2	2	1	23	17
Benfica de Macau	2017	Liga de Elite	14	20	4	3	2	1	20	24
Benfica de Macau	2018	Liga de Elite	15	20	7	2	5	2	27	24
Benfica de Macau	2019	Liga de Elite	15	11	0	0	0	0	15	11
Benfica de Macau	2025	Liga de Elite	14	7	5	3	0	0	19	10
Benfica de Macau	2026	Liga de Elite	16	18	1	0	0	0	17	18
Benfica de Macau	Total		117	105	39	15	9	4	165	124
Sporting Macau	2019	Liga de Elite	0	0	6	4	0	0	6	4
Sporting Macau	2020	Liga de Elite	8	5	0	0	0	0	8	5
Sporting Macau	Total		8	5	6	4	0	0	14	9
Chao Pak Kei	2021	Liga de Elite	17	24	0	0	0	0	17	24
Chao Pak Kei	2022	Liga de Elite	15	32	8	5	0	0	23	37
Chao Pak Kei	2023	Liga de Elite	10	14	0	0	5	6	15	20
Chao Pak Kei	2024	Liga de Elite	15	16	5	3	0	0	20	19
Chao Pak Kei	Total		57	86	13	8	5	6	75	100
Total career			238	242	79	39	14	10	331	291

=== International ===
National team	Years	Caps	Goals
Macau	2011	2	0
Macau	2014	1	1
Macau	2015	3	0
Macau	2016	4	4
Macau	2017	5	3
Macau	2019	1	0
Macau	2023	5	1
Total		21	9

Scores and results list Macau's goal tally first.

#	Date	Venue	Opponent	Score	Result	Competition
1.	14 October 2014	Estádio Campo Desportivo, Taipa, Macau	Singapore	2–2	2–2	Friendly
2.	3 November 2016	Sarawak Stadium, Kuching, Malaysia	Mongolia	1–0	2–1	2016 AFC Solidarity Cup
3.	3 November 2016	Sarawak Stadium, Kuching, Malaysia	Mongolia	2–1	2–1	2016 AFC Solidarity Cup
4.	6 November 2016	Sarawak Stadium, Kuching, Malaysia	Laos	3–1	4–1	2016 AFC Solidarity Cup
5.	6 November 2016	Sarawak Stadium, Kuching, Malaysia	Laos	4–1	4–1	2016 AFC Solidarity Cup
6.	2 October 2017	Estádio Campo Desportivo, Taipa, Macau	Laos	3–1	3–1	Friendly
7.	11 October 2017	Sree Kanteerava Stadium, Bengaluru, India	India	1–1	1–4	2019 AFC Asian Cup qualification
8.	14 November 2017	Estádio Campo Desportivo, Taipa, Macau	Kyrgyzstan	2–3	3–4	2019 AFC Asian Cup qualification
9.	12 October 2023	Thuwunna Stadium, Yangon, Myanmar	Myanmar	1–1	1–5	2026 FIFA World Cup qualification
