= 2014 Campeonato da 1ª Divisão do Futebol =

Campeonato da 1ª Divisão do Futebol
- Season: 2014
- Champions: Benfica de Macau (1st title)
- Relegated: Kei Lun
- Matches: 72
- Goals: 303 (4.21 per match)
- Top goalscorer: William Gomes (16 goals)

The 2014 Liga de Elite started on 8 February 2014 and ended on 22 June 2014.

== League table ==
Pos	Team	Pld	W	D	L	GF	GA	GD	Pts	Qualification or relegation
1	Benfica de Macau (C)	16	13	2	1	63	5	+58	41	2015 AFC Cup
2	Sporting Clube de Macau	16	12	2	2	41	11	+30	38	
3	Monte Carlo	16	11	3	2	56	19	+37	36	
4	Windsor Arch Ka I	16	9	4	3	47	17	+30	31	
5	Polícia	16	5	4	7	24	24	0	19	
6	Chao Pak Kei	16	4	5	7	26	30	−4	17	
7	Lai Chi	16	4	1	11	26	52	−26	13	
8	MFA Develop	16	3	0	13	10	63	−53	9	
9	Kei Lun (R)	16	0	1	15	10	82	−72	1	Relegation to Second Division

Updated to match(es) played on 4 May 2014. Source: futbol24.com
Rules for classification: 1) points; 2) goal difference; 3) number of goals scored.
(C) Champions; (R) Relegated
- Lam Pak, Lam Ieng and Kuan Tai were withdrawn due to financial reasons.

== Match results ==
8 February 2014 1	Polícia	0–1	Benfica de Macau	Taipa
14:00 UTC+8		Report	Bruno Martinho 65'	Stadium: Estádio Campo Desportivo

8 February 2014 1	Kei Lun	0–4	Lai Chi	Taipa
16:00 UTC+8		Report	Can Tin Lok 54'; Au Ip Nam 63', 88'; Pang Chi Hang 70'	Stadium: Estádio Campo Desportivo

9 February 2014 1	Sporting Clube de Macau	2–0	Monte Carlo	Taipa
14:00 UTC+8	Bruno Logo 35'; Luis Pereira 39' (pen.)	Report		Stadium: Estádio Campo Desportivo

9 February 2014 1	MFA Develop	0–4	Chao Pak Kei	Taipa
16:00 UTC+8		Report	Aureo Neto 32', 83'; Diego Silva 45' (pen.); Cheong Kin Chong 50'	Stadium: Estádio Campo Desportivo

15 February 2014 2	Sporting Clube de Macau	2–0	MFA Develop	Taipa
14:00 UTC+8	Alexandre Matos 14'; Rodrigo Veloso 80'	Report		Stadium: Estádio Campo Desportivo

15 February 2014 2	Windsor Arch Ka I	0–0	Benfica de Macau	Taipa
16:00 UTC+8		Report		Stadium: Estádio Campo Desportivo

16 February 2014 2	Kei Lun	2–7	Chao Pak Kei	Taipa
14:00 UTC+8	Zhao Jian 61'; Chang Gaohang 66'	Report	Mayckol Savinio 5', 50', 73'; Diego Silva 45'; Cheong Kin Chong 72', 90'; Chu Su Cheok 80'	Stadium: Estádio Campo Desportivo

16 February 2014 2	Polícia	1–1	Monte Carlo	Taipa
16:00 UTC+8	Hoi Wai Tong 43'	Report	Rafael Medeiros 39'	Stadium: Estádio Campo Desportivo

22 February 2014 3	Windsor Arch Ka I	5–1	Lai Chi	Taipa
14:00 UTC+8	Gustavo Oliveira 8'; Ho Man Hou 30'; Lee Keng Pan 44'; Christopher Nwaorou 50'; Brito Agues 90+2'	Report	Kong Hou Chi 3'	Stadium: Estádio Campo Desportivo

22 February 2014 3	Polícia	0–1	MFA Develop	Taipa
16:00 UTC+8		Report	Ho Ka Seng 38'	Stadium: Estádio Campo Desportivo

23 February 2014 3	Benfica de Macau	1–2	Monte Carlo	Taipa
14:00 UTC+8	Mario De Almeida 33'	Report	Francisco Rodrigo 31' (pen.); Francisco Falcao 74'	Stadium: Estádio Campo Desportivo

23 February 2014 3	Kei Lun	0–3	Sporting Clube de Macau	Taipa
16:00 UTC+8		Report	Antonio Lobo 68', 72'; Luis Pereira 75'	Stadium: Estádio Campo Desportivo

1 March 2014 4	Polícia	2–1	Kei Lun	Taipa
14:00 UTC+8	Leong Chan Pong 16'; Un Tak Ian 58'	Report	Cai Haojian 90'	Stadium: Estádio Campo Desportivo

1 March 2014 4	Lai Chi	1–4	Chao Pak Kei	Taipa
16:00 UTC+8	Au Ip Nam 81'	Report	Cheong Kin Cheong 42'; Diego Silva Patriota 66'; Mayckol Savino 69', 90'	Stadium: Estádio Campo Desportivo

2 March 2014 4	Windsor Arch Ka I	1–2	Monte Carlo	Taipa
18:30 UTC+8	Ho Man Hou 80'	Report	Cardona 5', 71'	Stadium: Estádio Campo Desportivo

2 March 2014 4	Benfica de Macau	3–0	MFA Develop	Taipa
20:30 UTC+8	Jose Luis Da Cruz 5'; Lei Kam Hong 64'; Filipe Duarde 82'	Report		Stadium: Estádio Campo Desportivo

15 March 2014 5	Windsor Arch Ka I	1–0	Chao Pak Kei	Taipa
14:00 UTC+8	Vernon Wong 90'	Report		Stadium: Estádio Campo Desportivo

15 March 2014 5	Monte Carlo	10–0	MFA Develop	Taipa
16:00 UTC+8	Rodrigo 16', 24', 43'; Rafael Medeiros 18' (pen.); Leong Ka Hang 35', 39', 85'; Júlio Tavares 69', 78'; Chao Wai Fong 87'	Report		Stadium: Estádio Campo Desportivo

16 March 2014 5	Lai Chi	1–4	Sporting Clube de Macau	Taipa
14:00 UTC+8	Pang Chi Hang 49'	Report	Bruno Brito 17', 84'; Luis Ferreira 39', 58'	Stadium: Estádio Campo Desportivo

16 March 2014 5	Benfica de Macau	11–0	Kei Lun	Taipa
16:00 UTC+8	William Carlos 10', 13', 61', 64'; Lei Kam Hong 16'; Bruno Martinho 35', 41', 46'; Fabrício 47'; Pak Chun Chan 49'; Edgar Teixeira 59'	Report		Stadium: Estádio Campo Desportivo

22 March 2014 6	Monte Carlo	6–1	Kei Lun	Taipa
14:00 UTC+8	Leong Ka Hang 2'; Chan Man 13'; Francisco Falcao 24'; Rafael Medeiros 32'; Rodrigo Carmo 65', 82'	Report	Lei Ka Wa 88'	Stadium: Estádio Campo Desportivo

22 March 2014 6	Chao Pak Kei	0–0	Sporting Clube de Macau	Taipa
16:00 UTC+8		Report		Stadium: Estádio Campo Desportivo

23 March 2014 6	Windsor Arch Ka I	10–0	MFA Develop	Taipa
14:00 UTC+8	Brito 13', 71'; Gustavo 15' (pen.), 82'; Adilson Silva 40', 51', 60'; Carlos Silva 45'; Lee Keng Pan 49'; Christopher Nwaorou 78'	Report		Stadium: Estádio Campo Desportivo

23 March 2014 6	Lai Chi	1–2	Polícia	Taipa
16:00 UTC+8	Tam Kai Hong 77'	Report	William Shek 50'; Leong Lap San 86' (pen.)	Stadium: Estádio Campo Desportivo

29 March 2014 7	Lai Chi	0–9	Benfica de Macau	Taipa
14:00 UTC+8		Report	Bruno Martinho 4'; Pak Chun Chan 8'; Fabrício 18', 29'; Filipe Duarte 33', 51'; Torrão 45'; William Carlos 58', 62'	Stadium: Estádio Campo Desportivo

29 March 2014 7	MFA Develop	4–3	Kei Lun	Taipa
16:00 UTC+8	Kuan Io Lo 40'; Lo Ka Hou 50'; Ho Ka Seng 64' (pen.); Mok Koi Hei 79'	Report	Wong Ka Wai 23', 51'; Chan Kin Seng 80'	Stadium: Estádio Campo Desportivo

30 March 2014 7	Chao Pak Kei	1–1	Polícia	Taipa
14:00 UTC+8	Mayckol Savino 25'	Report	Leong Chon Kit 15'	Stadium: Estádio Campo Desportivo

30 March 2014 7	Windsor Arch Ka I	1–1	Sporting Clube de Macau	Taipa
16:00 UTC+8	Kim Young-Bin 17'	Report	Bruno Brito 72'	Stadium: Estádio Campo Desportivo

5 April 2014 8	Sporting Clube de Macau	1–0	Polícia	Taipa
17:30 UTC+8	Veloso 42'	Report		Stadium: Estádio Campo Desportivo

5 April 2014 8	Chao Pak Kei	0–3	Benfica de Macau	Taipa
19:30 UTC+8		Report	Bruno Martinho 15'; William Carlos 40'; Torrão 72'	Stadium: Estádio Campo Desportivo

6 April 2014 8	Monte Carlo	2–0	Lai Chi	Taipa
17:30 UTC+8	Anderson 23'; Rodrigo Carmo 87'	Report		Stadium: Estádio Campo Desportivo

6 April 2014 8	Windsor Arch Ka I	4–1	Kei Lun	Taipa
19:30 UTC+8	Ho Man Hou 53'; Kim Young-Bin 68', 79'; Carlos Silva 90'	Report	Yougeng Hu 71'	Stadium: Estádio Campo Desportivo

12 April 2014 9	Chao Pak Kei	0–1	Monte Carlo	Taipa
17:30 UTC+8		Report	Leong Ka Hang 78'	Stadium: Estádio Campo Desportivo

12 April 2014 9	MFA Develop	0–2	Lai Chi	Taipa
19:30 UTC+8		Report	Cheok Ka Fai 12'; Pun Keng Lam 32'	Stadium: Estádio Campo Desportivo

13 April 2014 9	Sporting Clube de Macau	0–3	Benfica de Macau	Taipa
17:30 UTC+8		Report	Vinício 56'; William 76' (pen.); Torrão 83' (pen.)	Stadium: Estádio Campo Desportivo

13 April 2014 9	Windsor Arch Ka I	1–1	Polícia	Taipa
19:30 UTC+8	Alison Brito 85'	Report	Choi Tak Seng 61'	Stadium: Estádio Campo Desportivo

19 April 2014 10	Benfica de Macau	3–0	Polícia	Taipa
17:30 UTC+8	Vinício 31', 60'; Filipe Duarte 44'	Report		Stadium: Estádio Campo Desportivo

19 April 2014 10	Lai Chi	5–0	Kei Lun	Taipa
19:30 UTC+8	Chi Hang Pang 2', 21', 41', 65'; Tin Lok Chan 24'	Report		Stadium: Estádio Campo Desportivo

20 April 2014 10	Monte Carlo	2–5	Sporting Clube de Macau	Taipa
17:30 UTC+8	Fernandes 48'; Leong Ka Hang 90'	Report	Bruno Brito 47', 70'; Edgar 52'; Gaspard Laplaine 58'; Alexandre Matos 67'	Stadium: Estádio Campo Desportivo

20 April 2014 10	Chao Pak Kei	4–0	MFA Develop	Taipa
19:30 UTC+8	Eduardo Tong 47'; Mayckol Savino 52', 63'; Kin Chong Cheong 77'	Report		Stadium: Estádio Campo Desportivo

3 May 2014 11	Benfica de Macau	1–0	Windsor Arch Ka I	Taipa
17:30 UTC+8	Bruno Martinho 22' (pen.)	Report		Stadium: Estádio Campo Desportivo

3 May 2014 11	Chao Pak Kei	0–0	Kei Lun	Taipa
19:30 UTC+8		Report		Stadium: Estádio Campo Desportivo

4 May 2014 11	Monte Carlo	4–0	Polícia	Taipa
17:30 UTC+8	Leong Ka Hang 11'; Rafael Medeiros 63', 80', 90'	Report		Stadium: Estádio Campo Desportivo

4 May 2014 11	MFA Develop	0–1	Sporting Clube de Macau	Taipa
19:30 UTC+8		Report	Jardel 55'	Stadium: Estádio Campo Desportivo

10 May 2014 12	Lai Chi	3–4	Windsor Arch Ka I	Taipa
17:30 UTC+8	Ip Nam Au 27'; Pang Chi Hang 56'; Kai Hong Tam 79'	Report	Nwaorou 2'; Kim Young-bin 69'; Lee Keng Pan 73'; Samuel Thabo 85'	Stadium: Estádio Campo Desportivo

10 May 2014 12	Monte Carlo	1–1	Benfica de Macau	Taipa
19:30 UTC+8	Anderson 43'	Report	Filipe Duarte 16'	Stadium: Estádio Campo Desportivo

11 May 2014 12	MFA Develop	postoponed	Polícia	Taipa
17:30 UTC+8		Report	Tak Seng Choi 37'; Loi Cheong 38'	Stadium: Estádio Campo Desportivo

11 May 2014 12	Sporting Clube de Macau	postoponed	Kei Lun	Taipa
19:30 UTC+8		Report		Stadium: Estádio Campo Desportivo

17 May 2014 13	Monte Carlo	2–2	Windsor Arch Ka I	Taipa
17:30 UTC+8	Cardona 54', 70'	Report	Samuel Thabo 45'; Alison Brito 75'	Stadium: Estádio Campo Desportivo

17 May 2014 13	Chao Pak Kei	1–1	Lai Chi	Taipa
19:30 UTC+8	Kwok Siu Tin 51'	Report	Pang Chi Hang 47'	Stadium: Estádio Campo Desportivo

18 May 2014 13	MFA Develop	0–6	Benfica de Macau	Taipa
17:30 UTC+8		Report	Iuri Capelo 1', 29', 37'; Marcus Tavares 10', 15'; Zé Lopes 38'	Stadium: Estádio Campo Desportivo

18 May 2014 13	Kei Lun	0–6	Polícia	Taipa
19:30 UTC+8		Report	Leong Chan Pong 8', 84'; Wai Tong Hoi 61'; Chan Weng Son 65'; William Shek 75'; Tak Ian Un 90+3'	Stadium: Estádio Campo Desportivo

24 May 2014 14	Chao Pak Kei	1–4	Windsor Arch Ka I	Taipa
17:30 UTC+8	Pedro Pereira 52'	Report	Kim Young-bin 8', 9'; Adilson Silva 23'; Ho Man Hou 45'	Stadium: Estádio Campo Desportivo

24 May 2014 14	MFA Develop	1–3	Monte Carlo	Taipa
19:30 UTC+8	Lam Ka Seng 70'	Report	Julio Tavares 3'; Falcão 12'; Rodrigo 82'	Stadium: Estádio Campo Desportivo

25 May 2014 14	Sporting Clube de Macau	4–1	Lai Chi	Taipa
17:30 UTC+8	Jardel 14'; Bruno Brito 34', 89'; Gaspard Laplaine 62'	Report	Au Ip Man 38'	Stadium: Estádio Campo Desportivo

25 May 2014 14	Kei Lun	0–8	Benfica de Macau	Taipa
19:30 UTC+8		Report	Nicholas Torrão 8', 13', 87'; Iuri Capelo 10'; Vinício Alves 14', 50'; William Carlos 36', 89'	Stadium: Estádio Campo Desportivo

31 May 2014 15	MFA Develop	1–4	Windsor Arch Ka I	Taipa
17:30 UTC+8	Ho Ka Seng 5'	Report	Kim Young-bin 26'; Gustavo Oliveira 29'; Lee Keng Pan 60'; Samuel Thabo 78'	Stadium: Estádio Campo Desportivo

31 May 2014 15	Sporting Clube de Macau	4–0	Chao Pak Kei	Taipa
19:30 UTC+8	Jardel 20', 58'; Wamba 27'; Mesquita 51'	Report		Stadium: Estádio Campo Desportivo

1 June 2014 15	Kei Lun	1–8	Monte Carlo	Taipa
17:30 UTC+8	Mak Keng Hou 47'	Report	Rodrigo 9' (pen.), 41', 56', 61'; Rafael Medeiros 54', 84'; Chan Man 58'; Chao Wang Fong 79'	Stadium: Estádio Campo Desportivo

1 June 2014 15	Polícia	4–0	Lai Chi	Taipa
19:30 UTC+8	Ho Kin Tong 24', 64'; Loi Cheong 56', 88'	Report		Stadium: Estádio Campo Desportivo

4 June 2014 12	MFA Develop	0–5	Polícia	Taipa
19:00 UTC+8		Report	Tak Seng Choi 37', 72'; Loi Cheong 38', 63'; William Shek 85'	Stadium: Estádio Campo Desportivo

4 June 2014 12	Sporting Clube de Macau	6–0	Kei Lun	Taipa
20:00 UTC+8	Gaspard Laplaine 24'; Bruno Brito 42' (pen.); Veloso 47'; Junior Pascoal 65'; Chico Cunha 82'; Noronha 89'	Report		Stadium: Estádio Campo Desportivo

7 June 2014 16	Polícia	1–1	Chao Pak Kei	Taipa
17:30 UTC+8	Lap San Leong 13'	Report	Diego 45' (pen.)	Stadium: Estádio Campo Desportivo

7 June 2014 16	Benfica de Macau	9–0	Lai Chi	Taipa
19:30 UTC+8	William 42', 53', 63', 84', 85'; Bruno Martinho 30', 34', 45'	Report		Stadium: Estádio Campo Desportivo

8 June 2014 16	Sporting Clube de Macau	2–1	Windsor Arch Ka I	Taipa
17:30 UTC+8	Bruno Brito 10'; Jardel 25'	Report	Adilson Silva 45'	Stadium: Estádio Campo Desportivo

8 June 2014 16	Kei Lun	1–2	MFA Develop	Taipa
19:30 UTC+8	? 5'	Report	Ka Weng Kuong 30'; Koi Hei Mok 71'	Stadium: Estádio Campo Desportivo

13 June 2014 17	Kei Lun	0–6	Windsor Arch Ka I	Taipa
19:00 UTC+8		Report	Leonardo Abrantes 22'; Bruno Figueiredo 28'; Carlos Silva 29', 66'; Christopher Nwaorou 32'; Adilson Silva 42'	Stadium: Estádio Campo Desportivo

13 June 2014 17	Benfica de Macau	2–1	Chao Pak Kei	Taipa
21:00 UTC+8	Bruno Martinho 42' (pen.), 61' (pen.)	Report	Diego 11'	Stadium: Estádio Campo Desportivo

15 June 2014 17	Polícia	0–5	Sporting Clube de Macau	Taipa
17:30 UTC+8		Report	Edgar 18'; Rodrigo Veloso 24', 81'; Bruno Brito 28', 37'	Stadium: Estádio Campo Desportivo

15 June 2014 17	Lai Chi	1–3	Monte Carlo	Taipa
19:30 UTC+8	Kai Hong Tam 10'	Report	Chan Man 3'; Sio Ka Un 32', 90'	Stadium: Estádio Campo Desportivo

21 June 2014 18	Polícia	1–3	Windsor Arch Ka I	Taipa
17:30 UTC+8	Man Leong Lam 53'	Report	da Silva 42'; Carlos Silva 45'; Ho Man Hou 51'	Stadium: Estádio Campo Desportivo

21 June 2014 18	Lai Chi	5–1	MFA Develop	Taipa
19:30 UTC+8	Au Chi Kun 7'; Kai Hong Tam 47'; Ka Fai Cheok 50'; Chan In Choi 70'; Ip Nam Au 90'	Report	Kam Chi Hou 79'	Stadium: Estádio Campo Desportivo

22 June 2014 18	Benfica de Macau	2–1	Sporting Clube de Macau	Taipa
17:30 UTC+8		Report		Stadium: Estádio Campo Desportivo

22 June 2014 18	Monte Carlo	9–2	Chao Pak Kei	Taipa
19:30 UTC+8		Report		Stadium: Estádio Campo Desportivo
