= Danilo Lins =

Brazilian footballer (born 1986)

Personal information
- Full name: Danilo de Fausto Lins
- Date of birth: 23 May 1986 (age 40)
- Place of birth: Recife, Brazil
- Height: 1.79 m (5 ft 10 1/2 in)
- Position: Forward

Senior career*
Years	Team	Apps	(Gls)
2006–2008	Náutico	10	(1)
2009	Guarani-MG	7	(1)
2009	San Martín		
2010	Mogi Mirim		
2010–2011	East Riffa		
2011	Araripina	2	(0)
2012	Ypiranga	13	(4)
2012	Chã Grande	2	(0)
2013	Resende	4	(0)
2013	América		
2014	Central	19	(8)
2014	Mogi Mirim	1	(0)
2014	Remo	0	(0)
2015	CRAC	1	(0)
2015	Juventus-SC	9	(2)
2015	Icasa	4	(1)
2016	CRAC	2	(0)
2016	Madureira	1	(0)
2016	Guarani-CE	3	(0)
2016–2017	CSE	2	(0)
2017	Gloria	1	(0)
2018–2020	C.P.K.	27	(52)
2022	C.P.K.	0	(0)
2023	Monte Carlo		
- * Club domestic league appearances and goals as of 19:45, 19 January 2022 (UTC)

Danilo de Fausto Lins (born 23 May 1986) is a Brazilian footballer who currently plays for Liga de Elite side Monte Carlo.

== Career statistics ==
=== Club ===
As of 19 January 2022.

Club	Season	League			State League		Cup		Other		Total	
Club	Season	Division	Apps	Goals	Apps	Goals	Apps	Goals	Apps	Goals	Apps	Goals
Náutico	2006	Série B	9	1	0	0	3 (Note: Appearances in the Copa do Brasil)	1	0	0	12	2
Náutico	2007	Série A	1	0	0	0	0	0	0	0	1	0
Náutico	2008	Série A	0	0	0	0	1	1	0	0	1	1
Náutico	Total		10	1	0	0	4	2	0	0	14	3
Guarani-MG	2009	–			7 (Note: Appearances in the Campeonato Mineiro)	1	0	0	0	0	7	1
Araripina	2011	–			2 (Note: Appearances in the Campeonato Pernambucano)	0	0	0	0	0	2	0
Ypiranga	2012	Série D	0	0	13	4	0	0	0	0	13	4
Chã Grande	2012	–			2 (Note: Appearances in the Campeonato Pernambucano A2)	0	0	0	0	0	2	0
Resende	2013	Série D	0	0	4 (Note: Appearances in the Campeonato Carioca)	0	0	0	0	0	4	0
Central	2014	Série D	0	0	19	8	0	0	0	0	19	8
Mogi Mirim	2014	Série C	1	0	0	0	0	0	0	0	1	0
Remo	2014	Série D	0	0	0	0	0	0	0	0	0	0
CRAC	2015	Série D	0	0	1 (Note: Appearances in the Campeonato Catarinense A2)	0	0	0	0	0	1	0
Juventus-SC	2015	–			9 (Note: Appearances in the Campeonato Goiano)	2	0	0	0	0	9	2
Icasa	2015	Série C	4	1	0	0	0	0	0	0	4	1
CRAC	2016	–			2	0	0	0	0	0	2	0
Madureira	2016	Série D	0	0	1	0	0	0	0	0	1	0
Guarani-CE	2016	Série D	3	0	0	0	0	0	0	0	3	0
CSE	2017	–			2 (Note: Appearances in the Campeonato Alagoano)	0	0	0	0	0	2	0
Gloria	2017	–			1 (Note: Appearances in the Campeonato Gaúcho A2)	0	0	0	0	0	1	0
Chao Pak Kei	2018	Liga de Elite	17	37	–		0	0	0	0	17	37
Chao Pak Kei	2019	Liga de Elite	10	15	–		2 (Note: Appearances in the Taça de Macau)	4	0	0	12	19
Chao Pak Kei	2020	Liga de Elite	0	0	–		0	0	0	0	0	0
Chao Pak Kei	2022	Liga de Elite	0	0	–		0	0	0	0	0	0
Chao Pak Kei	Total		27	52	0	0	2	4	0	0	29	56
Career total			45	54	63	15	6	6	0	0	114	75
