= Diego Patriota =

Brazilian footballer (born 1986)

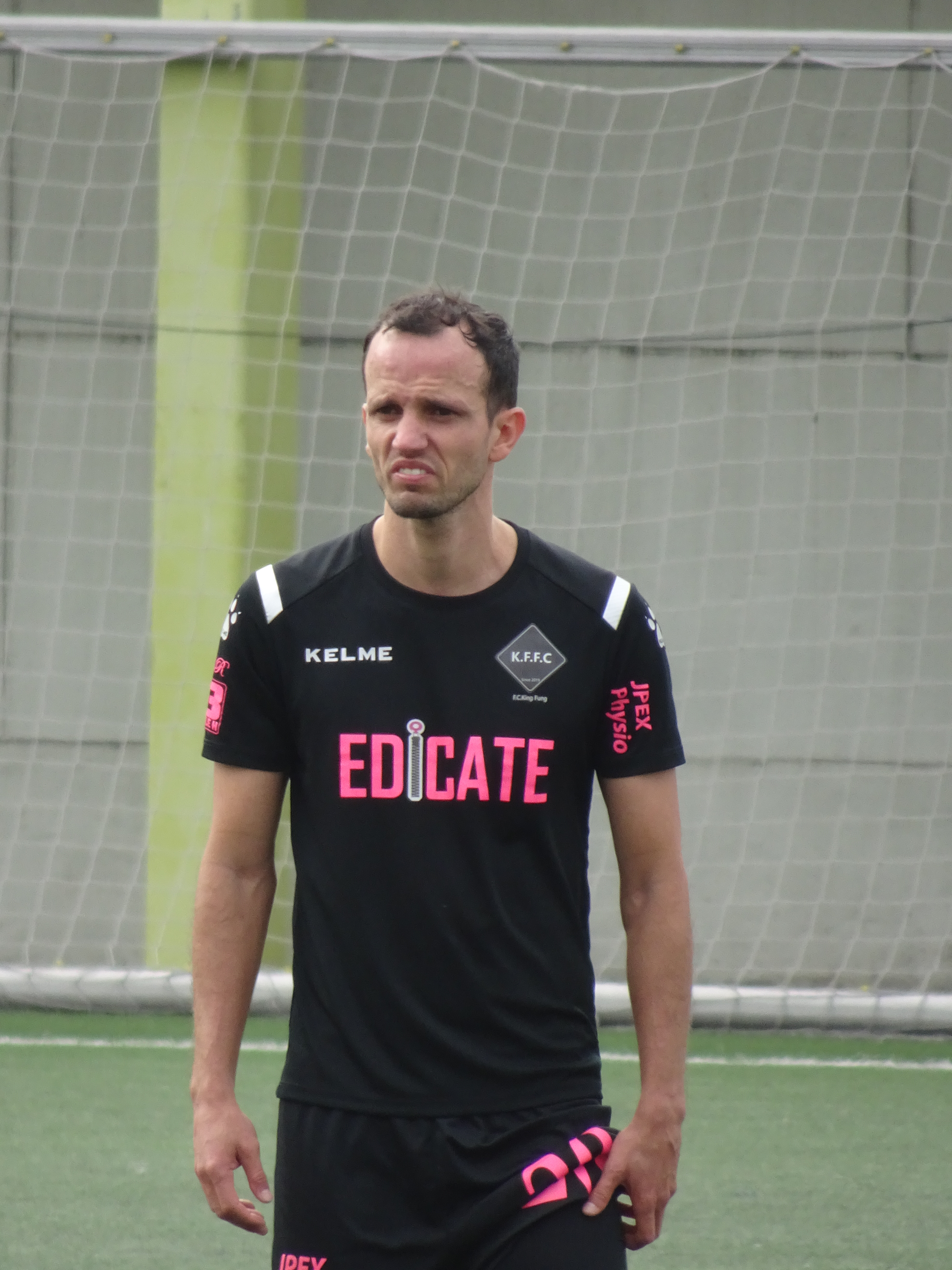
- Patriota with Hong Kong Sapling in 2020

Personal information
- Full name: Diego Silva Patriota
- Date of birth: 22 August 1986 (age 40)
- Place of birth: Recife, Brazil
- Height: 1.78 m (5 ft 10 in)
- Position: Midfielder

Team information
- Current team: Chao Pak Kei
- Number: 20

Youth career
- –2007: Sport

Senior career*
Years	Team	Apps	(Gls)
2007	Junak Sinj		
- Boavista
- Central
2008–2009	Sergipe		
2010	Mixto		
2010	Chã Grande		
2011	Sampaio Corrêa		
2011	Ypiranga	6	(0)
2012	Hermann Aichinger	1	(0)
2013	Windsor Arch Ka I	2	(0)
2014–2019	Chao Pak Kei	97	(92)
2019–2020	King Fung	10	(6)
2020–	Chao Pak Kei	66	(59)
- * Club domestic league appearances and goals

Diego Silva Patriota (Chinese: 迪亞高; born 22 August 1986), commonly known as Diego or Diego Patriota, is a Brazilian footballer who currently plays as a midfielder for Liga de Elite club Chao Pak Kei .

== Club career ==
Having started his career with Sport Club do Recife of his hometown, Patriota moved to Croatia to join third division Junak Sinj in 2007. He returned to Brazil and played for Boavista and Central before joining Mixto in 2010. He also played for Sergipe in 2009.

After a short spell with Chã Grande, he joined Sampaio Corrêa in 2011. He next played for Ypiranga, where he made 6 appearances in the Campeonato Pernambucano, before joining Hermann Aichinger and then eventually moving to Macau to join Windsor Arch Ka I.

He joined Chao Pak Kei for the 2014 season, and was one of the league's top scorers in 2015 and was voted the league's best player.

Patriota won Best Player of the Year Award again in 2018, after leading Chao Pak Kei to 2018 Macau FA Cup victory.

== Honours ==
Chao Pak Kei

- Liga de Elite: 2019, 2021, 2022
- Taça de Macau: 2018, 2021

== Career statistics ==
=== Club ===
As of 18 July 2024.

Club	Season	League			Cup		Other		Total	
Club	Season	Division	Apps	Goals	Apps	Goals	Apps	Goals	Apps	Goals
Ypiranga	2011	–			0	0	6 (Note: Appearances in the Campeonato Pernambucano)	0	6	0
Hermann Aichinger	2012	–			0	0	1 (Note: Appearances in the Campeonato Catarinense)	0	1	0
Windsor Arch Ka I	2013	1ª Divisão do Futebol	2	0	0	0	0	0	2	0
Chao Pak Kei	2014	1ª Divisão do Futebol	10	5	0	0	0	0	10	5
Chao Pak Kei	2015	1ª Divisão do Futebol	18	16	0	0	0	0	18	16
Chao Pak Kei	2016	1ª Divisão do Futebol	16	10	0	0	0	0	16	10
Chao Pak Kei	2017	Liga de Elite	18	14	0	0	0	0	18	14
Chao Pak Kei	2018	Liga de Elite	18	27	0	0	0	0	18	27
Chao Pak Kei	2019	Liga de Elite	17	20	2	1	0	0	19	21
Chao Pak Kei	Total		97	92	0	0	0	0	101	93
King Fung	2019–20	Hong Kong First Division	10	6	0	0	0	0	10	6
Chao Pak Kei	2020	Liga de Elite	5	7	0	0	0	0	5	7
Chao Pak Kei	2021	Liga de Elite	18	20	0	0	0	0	18	20
Chao Pak Kei	2022	Liga de Elite	15	9	0	0	0	0	15	9
Chao Pak Kei	2023	Liga de Elite	16	12	0	0	5	0	21	12
Chao Pak Kei	2024	Liga de Elite	12	11	0	0	0	0	12	11
Chao Pak Kei	Total		66	59	0	0	5	0	71	59
Career total			175	157	0	0	12	0	187	157
