= Lei Cheng Lam =

Macanese footballer

Lei Cheng Lam 林雷成
Personal information
- Date of birth: 24 January 2005 (age 21)
- Place of birth: Freguesia da Sé, Macau
- Height: 1.82 m (6 ft 0 in)
- Position: Midfielder

Team information
- Current team: Shao Jiang
- Number: 21

Senior career*
| Years | Team | Apps | (Gls) |
| 2020–2024 | Monte Carlo | 54 | (17) |
| 2024–2025 | MUST IPO | 17 | (7) |
| 2025–2026 | University of Macau | 15 | (4) |
| 2026– | Shao Jiang | 3 | (0) |

International career^{‡}
| 2023– | Macau | 7 | (1) |
- * Club domestic league appearances and goals ‡ National team caps and goals as of 19:59, 21 March 2026 (UTC)

Lei Cheng Lam (Chinese: 林雷成) is a Macanese international footballer who currently plays for Liga de Elite club Shao Jiang and the Macau national team.

== Club career ==
Lam began playing football at age six. He played for his school team at St. John's Secondary School and the Youth Soccer School. In 2015, he was invited to Portugal for a two-week training camp at Benfica. He then trained with Sporting CP. Lam joined the academy of Liga de Elite club C.D. Monte Carlo at age fifteen, a move the player considers critical to his development.

Lam was named the Best Under-23 player in the Liga de Elite as a member of Monte Carlo following the 2022 season, receiving 80% of the votes. He started and played the full ninety minutes of Monte Carlo's 1–2 defeat to Taichung Futuro of Taiwan in 2023–24 AFC Cup qualifying. After several highly successful seasons with Monte Carlo, Lam became a student at the Macau University of Science and Technology and joined its football team, MUST IPO, for the 2024 season. Lam was named to the League Best XI following his first season with the club.

The next year, he transferred to the University of Macau and joined its football club. The player cited the team's ability to hold more frequent training sessions on its own full-size pitch as one of the main reasons for the transfer. Lam traveled to Hong Kong with Macau national team head coach Kwok Kar Lok in January 2025. There, he had a one-week training stint with Eastern Sports Club of the Hong Kong Premier League. At that time, the player expressed a desire to play abroad, beginning in Hong Kong, following graduation from university.

== International career ==
Lam represented Macau at various youth levels. He first played for the territory as a member of the national under-16 team in the 2018 EAFF U-15 Men's Championship. He was later part of the under-20 team that competed in 2025 AFC U-20 Asian Cup qualification. He scored in a 1–1 draw with Palestine in the competition.

Lam received his first senior call-up in March 2023 for a friendly against Singapore. He went on to make his debut in the match, an eventual 0–1 defeat. Local media noted that Lam created, "many offensive opportunities in the match." He scored his first senior international goal on 14 December 2024 in a 2025 EAFF E-1 Football Championship qualification match against Guam. Despite the goal, Macau fell 1–2 and failed to qualify for the final tournament.

In February 2026, Lam scored in a Guangdong-Macao Cup match against the representative team from neighboring Guangdong province. Despite winning the match 3–2, the Guangdong XI won the cup on aggregate after winning the first match 2–0.

=== International goals ===
Scores and results list Macau's goal tally first.

| No. | Date | Venue | Opponent | Score | Result | Competition |
|---|---|---|---|---|---|---|
| 1. | 14 December 2024 | Kai Tak Sports Park, Kowloon, Hong Kong | Guam | 1–1 | 1–2 | 2025 EAFF E-1 Football Championship qualification |
Last updated 9 April 2024

=== International career statistics ===
As of match played 7 April 2024.

Macau
| Year | Apps | Goals |
|---|---|---|
| 2023 | 3 | 0 |
| 2024 | 3 | 1 |
| 2025 | 1 | 0 |
| Total | 7 | 1 |
