= 2017 Liga de Elite =

Liga de Elite
- Season: 2017
- Champions: Benfica de Macau (4th title)
- Relegated: Kei Lun; Development
- AFC Cup: Benfica de Macau
- Matches: 90
- Goals: 381 (4.23 per match)
- Top goalscorer: Carlos Leonel (21 goals)
- Highest scoring: Monte Carlo 9-2 Lai Chi (9 April 2017)
- Longest unbeaten run: 14 games Benfica de Macau

The 2017 Liga de Elite was the 45th season of the Liga de Elite, the top Macanese professional league for association football clubs, since its establishment in 1973. The season began on 13 January 2017 and ended on 2 July 2017.

== League table ==
| Pos | Team | Pld | W | D | L | GF | GA | GD | Pts | Qualification or relegation |
|---|---|---|---|---|---|---|---|---|---|---|
| 1 | Benfica de Macau (C) | 18 | 15 | 2 | 1 | 80 | 6 | +74 | 47 | Qualification for the 2018 AFC Cup group stage |
| 2 | Monte Carlo | 18 | 15 | 1 | 2 | 72 | 23 | +49 | 46 | |
| 3 | Chao Pak Kei | 18 | 14 | 1 | 3 | 55 | 16 | +39 | 43 | |
| 4 | Kei Lun (E) | 18 | 8 | 3 | 7 | 46 | 32 | +14 | 27 | Withdrew |
| 5 | Cheng Fung | 18 | 5 | 8 | 5 | 34 | 42 | −8 | 23 | |
| 6 | Tak Chun Ka I | 18 | 6 | 4 | 8 | 31 | 42 | −11 | 22 | |
| 7 | Sporting de Macau | 18 | 4 | 4 | 10 | 16 | 49 | −33 | 16 | |
| 8 | Polícia | 18 | 2 | 5 | 11 | 16 | 49 | −33 | 11 | |
| 9 | Lai Chi | 18 | 2 | 3 | 13 | 17 | 68 | −51 | 9 | |
| 10 | Development (R) | 18 | 2 | 3 | 13 | 19 | 60 | −41 | 9 | Relegation to the 2ª Divisão de Macau |

Updated to match(es) played on 2 July 2017. Source:
Rules for classification: 1) points; 2) goal difference; 3) number of goals scored.
(C) Champions; (E) Eliminated; (R) Relegated

== See also ==
- 2017 Taça de Macau
