= 2024 Liga de Elite =

Liga de Elite
- Dates: 22 February – 3 August 2024
- Champions: Benfica de Macau
- AFC Challenge League: Benfica de Macau (Failed to obtain the AFC license)
- Top goalscorer: (Brazil) William Gomes (22 goals)

The 2024 Liga de Elite was the 52nd season of the Liga de Elite, the top Macanese league for association football clubs since its establishment in 1973.

The league was won by Benfica de Macau for the sixth time. Ka I were relegated to 2ª Divisão de Macau. Sporting de Macau were due to be relegated but were granted a reprieve after Monte Carlo withdrew for the 2025 season.

Although domestic champions Benfica de Macau earned the sporting right to represent Macau on the continental stage, they failed to obtain the mandatory AFC Club License required by the Asian Football Confederation (AFC). As a result, Macau's allocated slot in the preliminary playoff stage of the AFC Challenge League was left vacant, leaving the territory unrepresented in Asian club competitions for the second consecutive year.

== Background ==
The 2024 season would be the 52nd edition of the Liga de Elite. Lam Pak were the most successful team in the league's history with nine titles but they had not won the league since 2009 and withdrew in 2014 for financial reasons.

Chao Pak Kei were four-time defending champions have won the league for the previous four seasons consecutively.

In the previous season, Toi Seng were relegated to the 2024 2ª Divisão de Macau and CFB Macau no longer competed in the league as they had withdrawn or were excluded. Gala and the University of Macau were promoted from the 2023 2ª Divisão de Macau as champions and runners-up respectively to replace them.

Benfica de Macau had won the league five times before, most recently in 2018.

== Format ==
The regular season consisted of a single round robin among the 10 teams. After every team had played every other team once, the league would split in half into a top five and a bottom five. The two sections would then play a double round robin among the teams in their section to decide the league winners and the relegation places. The teams finishing in ninth and 10th would be relegated to 2ª Divisão de Macau.

The season began on 22 February 2024 and ended on 3 August 2024.

== Regular season ==
=== League table ===
Pos	Team	Pld	W	D	L	GF	GA	GD	Pts	Qualification
1	Benfica de Macau	17	15	1	1	74	15	+59	46	Champions
2	Chao Pak Kei	17	13	3	1	84	11	+73	42	
3	Cheng Fung	17	9	4	4	38	20	+18	31	
4	Hang Sai	17	6	1	10	33	57	−24	19	
5	Lun Lok	17	4	2	11	26	78	−52	14	
6	University of Macau	17	9	1	7	31	27	+4	28	
7	Gala	17	8	3	6	46	23	+23	27	
8	Monte Carlo	17	6	4	7	27	23	+4	22	Withdrew for the 2025 season
9	Sporting de Macau	17	3	3	11	23	54	−31	12	Repreived from relegation
10	Ka I	17	1	0	16	15	89	−74	3	Relegation to 2ª Divisão de Macau

== Results ==
=== Matches 1–9 ===
Home \ Away	BEN	CPK	CHF	GAL	HAS	KAI	LUL	MCL	SPO	UMC
Benfica de Macau		0–2				8–0	9–2	1–0	10–0	2–0
Chao Pak Kei				3–0	8–1	7–0		3–0	10–0	6–0
Cheng Fung	0–1	0–0						3–1	3–0	
Gala	1–2		1–1		1–2		1–2	1–2		0–2
Hang Sai	3–4		1–3				2–1			2–2
Ka I			1–2	0–6	1–3		0–6		4–2	2–6
Lun Lok		1–10	1–3					3–1		
Monte Carlo					1–0	4–2			1–1	
Sporting de Macau				3–6	1–2		1–1			
University of Macau			0–3				1–3	1–0	2–0	

Legend: Blue = home team win; Yellow = draw; Red = away team win.
For upcoming matches, an "a" indicates there is an article about the rivalry between the two participants.

=== Matches 10–17 ===
==== Top five ====
Home \ Away	BEN	CPK	CHF	HAS	LUL
Benfica de Macau		4–3	3–0	5–2	8–0
Chao Pak Kei	0–0		1–1	4–2	9–0
Cheng Fung	1–2	0–2		8–3	2–2
Hang Sai	0–7	1–7	1–2		3–1
Lun Lok	1–8	1–9	0–6	1–5	

Legend: Blue = home team win; Yellow = draw; Red = away team win.
For upcoming matches, an "a" indicates there is an article about the rivalry between the two participants.

==== Bottom five ====
Home \ Away	GAL	KAI	MCL	SPO	UMC
Gala		10–0	1–1	1–0	1–0
Ka I	1–9		1–8	2–3	0–5
Monte Carlo	1–1	2–0		2–0	1–2
Sporting de Macau	3–4	4–1	1–1		2–0
University of Macau	0–2	4–0	2–1	4–2	

Legend: Blue = home team win; Yellow = draw; Red = away team win.
For upcoming matches, an "a" indicates there is an article about the rivalry between the two participants.

== See also ==
- 2024 Taça de Macau
