= 2019 Liga de Elite =

Liga de Elite
- Season: 2019
- Champions: Chao Pak Kei (1st title)
- Relegated: Development; Tim Iec
- Matches: 90
- Goals: 364 (4.04 per match)
- Top goalscorer: 19 goals Diego Patriota (Chao Pak Kei); William Gomes (Cheng Fung)

The 2019 Liga de Elite was the 47th season of the Liga de Elite, the top Macanese league for association football clubs since its establishment in 1973. The season began on 23 January 2019 and ended on 14 July 2019.

== League table ==
Pos	Team	Pld	W	D	L	GF	GA	GD	Pts	Qualification or relegation
1	Chao Pak Kei (C)	18	15	2	1	75	14	+61	47	Qualification for AFC Cup group stage
2	Cheng Fung	18	12	1	5	45	27	+18	37	
3	Benfica de Macau	18	11	2	5	40	16	+24	35	
4	Monte Carlo	18	10	4	4	41	22	+19	34	
5	Ka I	18	8	3	7	31	36	−5	27	
6	Hang Sai	18	8	0	10	35	40	−5	24	
7	Sporting de Macau	18	6	4	8	37	43	−6	22	
8	Polícia	18	5	1	12	18	45	−27	16	
9	Tim Iec (R)	18	4	3	11	23	52	−29	15	Relegation to 2ª Divisão de Macau
10	Development (R)	18	1	0	17	18	68	−50	3	Relegation to 2ª Divisão de Macau

Source: Macau FA
Rules for classification: 1) points; 2) goal difference; 3) number of goals scored.
(C) Champions; (R) Relegated

== Results ==
Home \ Away	CPK	CHF	BEN	MCL	KAI	HNS	SPO	POL	TIM	DEV
Chao Pak Kei		4–0	2–1	3–2	4–0	3–1	5–1	3–0	7–0	14–0
Cheng Fung	2–2		3–1	0–3	1–2	4–0	4–2	4–2		4–1
Benfica de Macau	1–1	1–0		3–0	4–0	4–0	7–0	2–0	2–0	3–1
Monte Carlo	4–1	1–2	2–0		1–3	3–2	1–1	1–1	4–0	5–1
Ka I	1–5	1–2	0–0	0–2		0–2	2–1	2–1	4–2	4–1
Hang Sai	1–2	1–3	3–0	1–3	4–1		3–5	0–1	3–2	2–1
Sporting de Macau	0–3	0–2	3–2	3–3	1–1	1–4		4–0	1–1	3–1
Polícia	0–6	0–3	0–3	0–3	0–2	1–3	1–7		2–0	2–1
Tim Iec	0–6	2–5	1–5	0–0	2–2	5–2	0–2	1–3		2–1
Development	0–4	1–4	0–1	1–3	3–6	1–3	3–2	0–4	1–2	

Updated to match(es) played on unknown. Source:
Legend: Blue = home team win; Yellow = draw; Red = away team win.

== See also ==
- 2019 Taça de Macau
