= Macau Chiba FC =

- Full name: Macau Chiba Football Club
- Founded: 2002; 24 years ago
- Ground: Lin Fong Sports Centre
- Capacity: 2,200
- League: Liga de Elite
- 2025: 6th
- Website: Website

Macau Chiba FC (Chinese: 千葉) is a professional association football club from Macau currently competing in the Liga de Elite. The club also fields futsal and seven-a-side teams.

== History ==
Macau Chiba Football Club was founded in 2002 by local player and enthusiast Su Zhenyu with his friends at age sixteen. After studying in Australia, he returned home and began playing for several clubs in Macau's top division. Zhenyu applied his experience to the management of Macau Chiba with the goal of becoming a world-class club. Since 2013, Macau Chiba has trained youth players between the ages of three and thirteen. The club has previously also been named Chiba Sport and Ivo Chiba at various points in its history.

In 2024, the club finished as runners-up in the 2ª Divisão and were promoted to the Liga de Elite for the 2025 season. Following the 2025 season, the club signed a strategic partnership with Discover Macau, a local lifestyle ecosystem platform. As part of the announcement ceremony, Chiba FC listed increasing training intensity, promoting the development of youth teams, and demonstrating the team's ambition to be the league's best as its goals for the 2026 season. Additionally, both parties hoped to create a "Macauization" of local football to increase sports tourism while growing the football culture in the territory.

Chiba FC opened the 2026 season with a defeat to Shao Jiang SA. Afterward, the club went on a three-match winning streak to climb to second place in the standings.
