= Gala FC =

Macanese association football club

- Full name: Gala Football Club
- Ground: Lin Fong Sports Centre
- Capacity: 2,200
- League: Liga de Elite
- 2025: 7th

Gala Football Club (Chinese: 嘉華足球隊) is an association football club based in Macau.

== History ==
Gala FC achieved promotion from the second tier to the top flight ahead of the 2024 season. The club won the 2024 Taça de Macau.

== Current squad ==
Squad for the 2026 Liga de Elite

Note: Flags indicate national team as defined under FIFA eligibility rules; some limited exceptions apply. Players may hold more than one non-FIFA nationality.

No.	Pos.	Nation	Player
1	GK	POR	Juan Castro
2	DF	MAC	Marcos Cheong
4	MF	MAC	Kuan-Io Lo
9	FW	MAC	Ka-Seng Ho (captain)
12	MF	MAC	Keng-Pan Lee
13	DF	MAC	Kun-Tou Leong
14	DF	MAC	Hou-Teng Leong
17	MF	MAC	Chi-Him Wu

No.	Pos.	Nation	Player
19	MF	MAC	Man-Tek Lei
20	MF	BRA	Pedro Costa
21	DF	MAC	Chin-Long Harrison Tang
33	MF	BRA	Gabriel Gonçalves
70	FW	MAC	Kuan-Hou Ng
88	MF	MAC	Wai-Hin Leong
99	MF	MAC	Chi-Hou Ng
