= 1995 Campeonato da 1ª Divisão do Futebol =

Campeonato da 1ª Divisão do Futebol
- Season: 1995
- Champions: Artilheiros

Statistics of Campeonato da 1ª Divisão do Futebol in the 1995 season.

== Overview ==
Artilheiros won the championship.
