= 2009 Campeonato da 1ª Divisão do Futebol =

1ª Divisão
- Season: 2009
- Champions: Lam Pak; 9th title
- Relegated: Vong Chiu; Hong Lok
- Matches: 56
- Goals: 216 (3.86 per match)
- Highest scoring: Hong Lok 0–10 Lam Pak

Pos	Team	Pld	W	D	L	GF	GA	GD	Pts
1	Lam Pak	14	13	0	1	57	8	+49	39
2	Ka I	14	12	1	1	41	10	+31	37
3	MFA Develop	14	7	3	4	20	18	+2	24
4	Hoi Fan	14	6	1	7	24	33	−9	19
5	Artilheiros	14	5	2	7	24	34	−10	17
6	Polícia	14	4	2	8	20	23	−3	14
7	Vong Chiu	14	3	2	9	22	36	−14	11
8	Hong Lok	14	0	1	13	8	54	−46	1

Source: rsssf.com

== Results ==
Home \ Away	ART	HOF	HOL	KAI	LPK	MFA	POL	VCH
Artilheiros		2–0	3–0	1–3	0–6	1–1	3–2	0–0
Hoi Fan	3–1		3–1	2–4	0–3	2–0	4–3	4–3
Hong Lok	1–6	3–4		0–4	0–10	0–1	1–1	0–1
Ka I	5–0	6–1	5–1		2–1	1–1	3–0	4–3
Lam Pak	7–1	2–0	8–1	1–0		3–1	1–0	3–1
MFA Develop	2–0	3–1	2–1	1–2	0–4		1–0	3–2
Polícia	2–0	4–1	1–0	0–1	1–2	1–1		1–0
Vong Chiu	2–6	0–0	6–1	0–3	1–6	0–3	5–4	

Source: rsssf.com
Legend: Blue = home team win; Yellow = draw; Red = away team win.
