= Carlos Leonel =

Macau footballer (born 1987)

Personal information
- Full name: Carlos Leonel Gois Fernandes
- Date of birth: 28 July 1987 (age 39)
- Place of birth: Ribeira Brava, Madeira, Portugal
- Height: 1.86 m (6 ft 1 in)
- Position: Forward

Youth career
- 2000–2001: Pontassolense
- 2001–2002: Marítimo
- 2002–2003: CD Barreirense
- 2003–2004: Nacional
- 2004–2005: Pontassolense
- 2005–2006: Nacional

Senior career*
Years	Team	Apps	(Gls)
2006–2007	Pontassolense	2	(0)
2007–2009	Ribeira Brava	10	(0)
2009–2010	Pampilhosa	4	(0)
2010–2011	Vigor Mocidade	26	(4)
2011–2012	Pampilhosa	-	(-)
2013–2014	Febres	15	(11)
2013–2014	Fátima	11	(6)
2014–2015	Tirsense	17	(3)
2015–2022	Benfica de Macau	97	(117)
Total		182	(141)

International career^{‡}
2016–2022	Macau	7	(4)

Managerial career
- 2022–2023: Benfica de Macau
- 2024: Jiangxi Dark Horse Junior (technical director)
- 2025: Wenzhou FC
- * Club domestic league appearances and goals as of 5:52 5 December 2023 (UTC) ‡ National team caps and goals as of 15:08 3 September 2017 (UTC)

Carlos Leonel Gois Fernandes (born 28 July 1987 in Ribeira Brava, Madeira, Portugal), commonly known as Carlos Leonel, is a former football player. He was the top scorer in the 2016 and 2017 Liga de Elite.

== Club career ==
=== Early career ===
Leonel has been a football player since he was six-years old. He was in Rio de Janeiro, Brazil, doing an exchange program when Carlos Vilar invited him to visit him in Macau and play for three months on Casa de Portugal in the 2ª Divisão de Macau.

=== Benfica de Macau ===
During the 2017 AFC Cup qualifying round held at Bishkek in Kyrgyzstan on 21 August 2016, Benfica de Macau played Rovers FC from Guam, Leonel scored twice and Benfica de Macau won the match 4–2.

On 4 March 2017, Leonel scored a hat-trick as Benfica de Macau beat C.D. Monte Carlo 6–0.

On 7 March 2018, Benfica de Macau took part in the 2018 AFC Cup group stage. After losing two goals in the first half to Hang Yuen, Leonel scored in the 61st and 63rd minutes to help the club overturn the score and won 3–2. It was Benfica de Macau's first ever win in the AFC Cup group stage. Leonel was awarded player of the match. On 16 May, Benfica de Macau beat Hwaebul Sports Club with Leonel scoring a hat-trick on the final day of the group stage. Benfica de Macau finished the second in the group.

On 14 January 2022, Benfica de Macau announced the retirement of Leonel as well as his appointment as the main coach.

In September 2024, Leonel was appointed as the head coach of China League Two club Jiangxi Dark Horse Junior, the club changed its name to Wenzhou FC in next year.

== International career ==
On 7 October 2016, Leonel was selected into the Macau national football team for the first time for the Hong Kong–Macau Interport.

On 5 September 2017, Leonel made his debut for Macau in the 2019 AFC Asian Cup qualification Third Round against India, but Macau lost 0–2.

On 2 October 2017, Macau played a friendly against Laos. At 72 minutes, Leonel scored with a header, then 2 minutes later he scored again and helped Macau overturn the score. In the end Macau won the match 3–1.

On 14 November 2017, Macau played Kyrgyzstan, at 87 minutes, Leonel scored, but Macau lost 3–4.

=== International goals ===
Macau's goals are listed first

No	Date	Venue	Opponent	Goal	Result	Competition
1.	2 October 2017	Estádio Campo Desportivo, Taipa, Macau	Laos	1–1	3–1	Friendly
2.	2 October 2017	Estádio Campo Desportivo, Taipa, Macau	Laos	2–1	3–1	Friendly
3.	14 Nov 2017	Estádio Campo Desportivo, Taipa, Macau	Kyrgyzstan	2–3	3–4	2019 AFC Asian Cup qualification
4.	2 September 2018	MFF Football Centre, Ulaanbaatar, Mongolia	Mongolia	1–2	1–4	2019 EAFF E-1 Football Championship qualification

== Honours ==
Individual

- 2016 Liga de Elite top scorer
- 2017 Liga de Elite top scorer
- 2021 Liga de Elite top scorer
