= 1991 Campeonato da 1ª Divisão do Futebol =

Campeonato da 1ª Divisão do Futebol
- Season: 1991
- Champions: Sporting de Macau

Statistics of Campeonato da 1ª Divisão do Futebol in the 1991 season.

== Overview ==
Sporting de Macau won the championship.
