= Football in Macau =

The sport of football in Macau is run by the Associação de Futebol de Macau. The association administers the national football team as well as the national league. The national team has never qualified for the AFC Asian Cup or EAFF East Asian Championship. The team qualified for the 2006 AFC Challenge Cup, where they got one draw and two losses.

Macau is a Special Administrative Region of the People's Republic of China. As a result the Sports and Olympic Committee of Macau, China is not recognized as a National Olympic Committee by the International Olympic Committee. The Macau national under-23 football team is thus unable to take part in the Olympic football tournament.

In November 2016, Macau finished second in the 2016 AFC Solidarity Cup. Due to the withdrawal of Guam and suspension of Kuwait, Macau qualified for the 2019 AFC Asian Cup qualifying third round.

There are three major FIFA standard 11-a-side football fields in Macau. They are:

- Estádio Campo Desportivo
- Macau University of Science and Technology Sports Field
- Lin Fong Stadium

== League system ==
Level	League(s)/division(s)
1	Liga de Elite; 10 clubs
	↓↑ 2 clubs
2	Segunda Divisão; 10 clubs
	↓↑ 3 clubs
3	Terceira Divisão; 12 clubs
	↓↑ 4 clubs
4	Junior Divisão; 80 clubs divided in 20 series of 4 clubs

=== Domestic tournaments ===
- Taça da Associação de Futebol de Macau (Macau FA Cup) the national open cup.

== Football stadiums in Macau ==
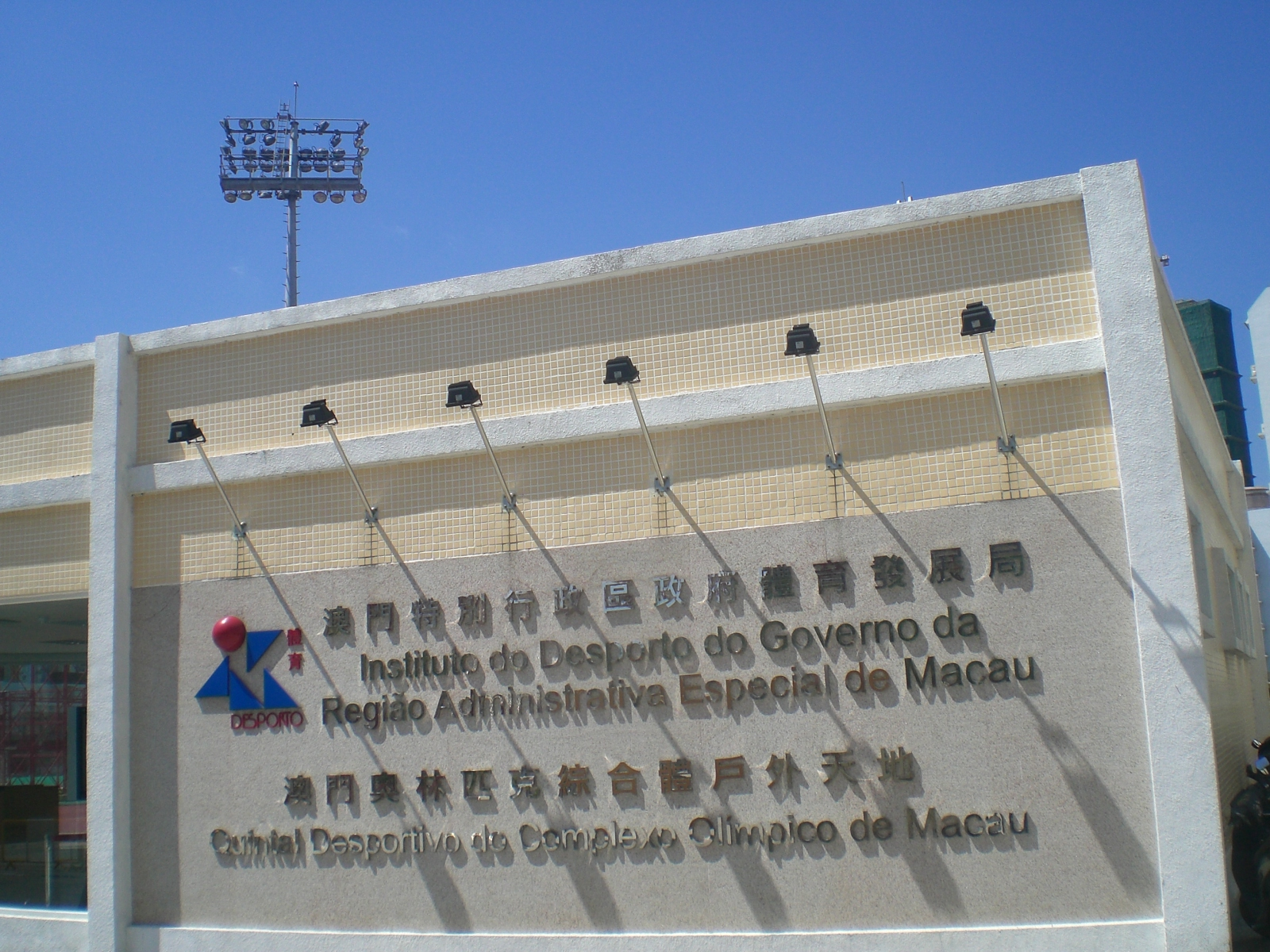
The Olympic sports complex

Stadium	City	Capacity	Tenants	Image
Centro Desportivo Olímpico - Estádio	Macau	16,272	Macau national football team	

== See also ==
- Lists of stadiums
