= 1984 Campeonato da 1ª Divisão do Futebol =

Campeonato da 1^{a} Divisão do Futebl
- Season: 1984
- Champions: Wa Seng

Statistics of Campeonato da 1ª Divisão do Futebol in the 1984 season.

== Overview ==
Wa Seng won the championship.
