= Shao Jiang SA =

- Full name: Macau Shao Jiang Sport Association
- Short name: SJADM
- Founded: 2015; 11 years ago
- Ground: Lin Fong Sports Centre
- Capacity: 2,200
- Chairman: Liang Zhongxing
- Manager: (Spain) Jesús Piñero
- League: Liga de Elite
- 2026: 1st, Champions
- Website: Website

Shao Jiang SA (Chinese: 少將體育會, Portuguese: Shao Jiang Associação Desportiva de Macau) is a professional association football club based Macau currently competing in the Liga de Elite.

== History ==
Shao Jiang SA was promoted to the Liga de Elite for the first time ahead of the 2025 season. Entering the final matchday, Shao Jiang had a chance to win the league title with a victory over MUST IPO to finish the club's first season in the top flight. Despite a victory in the match, the club ultimately finished its maiden top-flight campaign as the runner-up, one point behind the winners.

Ahead of the 2026 season, Shao Jiang made several foreign additions to the club after narrowly missing out on the title. The club opened its second campaign in the league against defending champions MUST IPO. Shao Jiang won the match, a result that would prove vital later in the season as the two clubs occupied the top two spots of the league table. The club clinched its first-ever league championship on the final matchday with a 7–0 victory over Gala FC. Shao Jiang's Colombian forward Jeim Botero scored two goals in the match to tie Niki Torrão as the league's top scorers with twenty-one goals. Despite the championship, Shao Jiang would not participate in the 2027–28 AFC Challenge League because it did not hold the necessary club license from the AFC. However, the club stated its commitment to starting the process early to become licensed for the following season.

== Recent seasons ==
Key

Champion Runners-up 3rd place

Season	League							Notes
Season	Div.	Pos.	Pl.	W	D	L	P	Notes
2022	IV	4th	6	4	0	2	12	Promoted to 3ª Divisão
2023	III	2nd	11	7	2	2	23	Promoted to 2ª Divisão de Macau
2024	II	1st	13	13	0	0	39	Promoted to Liga de Elite
2025	I	2nd	17	14	1	2	43	
2026	I	1st	18	15	2	1	47	
