= 1987 Campeonato da 1ª Divisão do Futebol =

Campeonato da 1^{a} Divisão do Futebl
- Season: 1987
- Champions: Hap Kuan

Statistics of Campeonato da 1ª Divisão do Futebol in the 1987 season.

== Overview ==
Hap Kuan won the championship.
