= 1996 Campeonato da 1ª Divisão do Futebol =

Campeonato da 1ª Divisão do Futebol
- Season: 1996
- Champions: Artilheiros

Statistics of Campeonato da 1ª Divisão do Futebol in the 1996 season.

== Overview ==
Artilheiros won the championship.
