= Cheng Fung FC =

Football club in Macau

Cheng Fung
- Full name: Cheng Fung
- Founded: 1988; 38 years ago
- Ground: Lin Fong Stadium
- Capacity: 2,000
- Chairman: Jose li
- Manager: Scumyush attavar
- League: Liga de Elite
- 2024: Liga de Elite, 3rd
Home colours	Away colours

Cheng Fong Football Club Of Macau (Chinese: 青鋒足球隊; Portuguese: Cheng Fong Futebol Clube De Macau) is a Macanese professional football club which currently competes in the Liga de Elite.

== 2019 season ==
The club won its first top tier trophy, the Taça de Macau in 2019 after beating defending champions Chao Pak Kei on penalties in the final.

== Current squad ==
Squad for the 2026 Liga de Elite

Note: Flags indicate national team as defined under FIFA eligibility rules; some limited exceptions apply. Players may hold more than one non-FIFA nationality.

No.	Pos.	Nation	Player
1	GK	MAC	Chi-Hang Fong
2	MF	MAC	Seng-Kuai Hun
3	DF	MAC	Rongrui Xiao
4	DF	MAC	Weng-Kin Lam
8	MF	COL	Brayan Gómez
9	FW	BRA	Roni Silva
10	MF	MAC	Hoi-Ka U
10	DF	MAC	Ka-Chon Cheong
11	FW	BRA	Danilo Lins
14	DF	MAC	Chon-Kit Pao
15	DF	MAC	U-Hin Cheang (captain)
16	DF	MAC	Lai-Kit Kuok
17	MF	MAC	Leonidio Costa

No.	Pos.	Nation	Player
19	DF	MAC	Hou-In Lei
20	FW	MAC	Jorge Vitorino
26	DF	MAC	Hoi-Chun Hoi
26	MF	MAC	U-Hin Wong
27	GK	MAC	Wai-Hang Alex Ao
28	MF	MAC	Chi-Kin Ao
32	DF	MAC	Man-Long Lei
44	FW	MAC	Sai-Hou Vong
46	DF	MAC	Chon-Iat Chong
61	MF	BRA	Diego Patriota
74	MF	KOR	Tae-yang Choi
85	DF	MAC	Hei-Long Wong
—	MF	GHA	Clement Adu

== Honours ==
=== Domestic ===
- Taça de Macau
  - Champions (1): 2019
  - Runners-up (3): 2018, 2021, 2025
