= 1993 Campeonato da 1ª Divisão do Futebol =

Campeonato da 1ª Divisão do Futebol
- Season: 1993
- Champions: Leng Ngan

Statistics of Campeonato da 1ª Divisão do Futebol in the 1993 season.

== Overview ==
Leng Ngan won the championship.
