= GD Artilheiros =

- Full name: Grupo Desportivo Artilheiros
- Founded: 1982; 44 years ago
- Ground: Lin Fong Sports Centre
- Capacity: 2,200
- League: Liga de Elite
- 2025: 2nd, 2ª Divisão (Promoted)
- Website: Website

GD Artilheiros (Chinese: 澳門炮兵足球會) is an association football club based in Taipa, Macau currently competing in the Liga de Elite.

== History ==
GD Artilheiros was formed in 1982 in the Taipa area of Macau. The club has won two first division titles with back-to-back championships for the 1994/95 and 1995/96 seasons.
