= Hoi Fan =

- Full name: Clube de Natação Hoi Fan
- Ground: Campo Desportivo da UCTM & Estádio Campo Desportivo; Macau
- Capacity: 1,700 & 15,490
- League: Campeonato da 1ª Divisão do Futebol
Home colours	Away colours

Clube de Natação Hoi Fan (Chinese: 海帆體育會) is a Macau football club, which plays in the town of Macau. They play in the Macau's first division, the Campeonato da 1ª Divisão do Futebol.

== History ==
Having been relegated after the 2006 season, they immediately gained promotion back to the 1ª Divisão in 2007 finishing runners-up of the 2ª Divisão. They started the 2008 season by holding defending Champions GD Lam Pak to a 1–1 draw.

== Honours ==
- Taça de Macau em Futebol

Winners (1): 2008
