= Sport in Macau =

Macau residents participate in a wide variety of sports for recreation and competition. Football, basketball, volleyball, Dragon Boat, jogging, swimming, table tennis, and badminton are among the most popular in the community. Local leagues and competitions are organized regularly every year, but owing to Macau's small population (about half a million) professional leagues are financially unfeasible and so most participants are merely local sport enthusiasts.

There are many sport associations and clubs in Macau which frequently organize local or regional sporting events and competitions. Owing to the amateur nature of local sports, all sport associations and clubs in Macau are run by organizations under government subsidies or sponsorships. The Macau Sport Development Board is the department responsible for Macau's sport development, venue operations and organization of major international sport events held in Macau (except the Macau Grand Prix, which is organized by the Macau Grand Prix Committee).

== Sport participation among the locals ==
There are over 50 sport associations in Macau. Their roles and responsibilities include organizing local and regional competitions, youth training, promoting sports to the local community, co-ordinating with the authorities to organize international sporting events and competitions. Under these associations there are hundreds of different sport clubs registered to the authority.

Non-professional leagues are organized for clubs to compete with one another. Leagues such as the football league, the basketball league, the volleyball league, dragon boating and the student leagues of various sports are those which attract the largest number of participants.

=== Football ===
In Macau, football is very popular and apart from playing the standard 11-a-side football, there is also another football league which uses smaller artificial pitches (75 × 50 metres) and smaller football (size No. 4, instead of No. 5 in standard football matches). This is mainly due to the lack of standard-size football pitches and it is easier to build and maintain smaller artificial pitches.

=== Basketball ===
Basketball is another popular sport in Macau. The game is generally played under FIBA rules and basketball courts (both outdoor and indoor) are widely available to the public. Non-professional basketball leagues are held each year and players who have decent performance in these leagues are generally selected for the Macau SAR Team.

=== Dragon Boating ===
Dragon Boating is a very popular sport in Macau due to its Chinese heritage. In 1979, the Macau Sport Bureau organised the first Macau Dragon Boat festival – an annual international dragon boating regatta held during the Dragon Boat Festival(Chinese: 端午節). Most dragon boat paddlers are between 20 – 40 years in age, with some teams incorporating junior paddlers as young as 16 years old.

=== Wushu ===
Wushu, a sport coming from China, is very popular in Macau. Macau has had a very high level wushu team for decades and it ranks seventh in the overall medal table for the World Wushu Championships as of 2019. Macau's only gold medals in the Asian Games were achieved by wushu athletes Jia Rui and Huang Junhua in 2010 and 2018 respectively.

== International sporting events held in Macau ==
=== Annual events ===
==== Macau Grand Prix ====
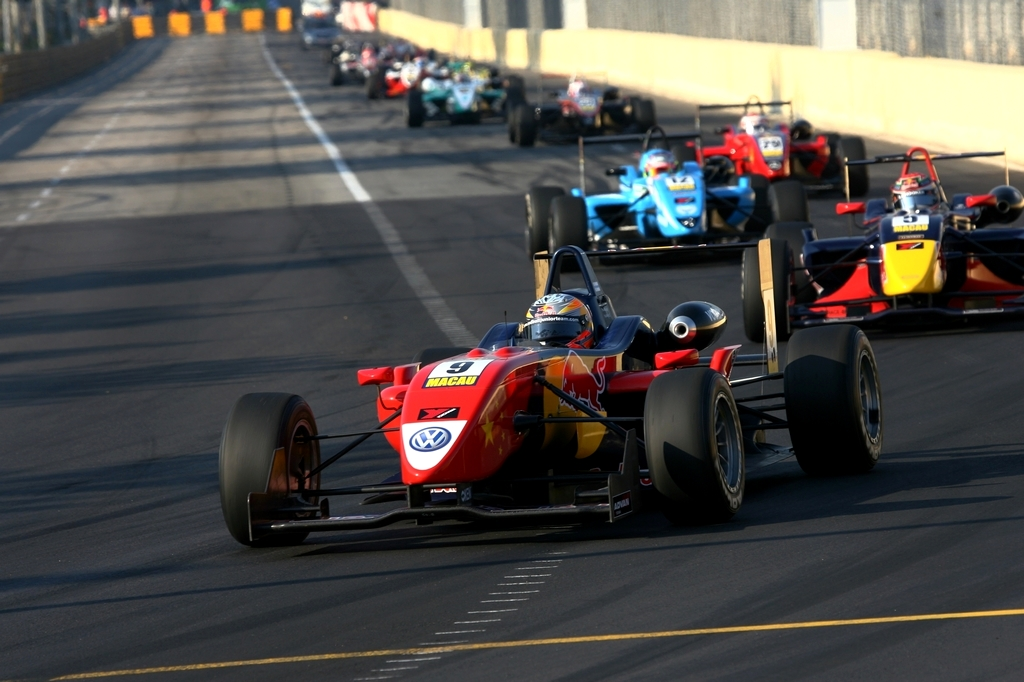
The 2008 Macau Grand Prix in progress

The Macau Grand Prix is an annual motor-racing event which takes place in November. Bearing similarities with the Monaco Grand Prix circuit in Monte Carlo, the Macau circuit, known as the Guia Circuit, is a street-circuit bounded by crash barriers with almost no run-off areas. Famous for its combination of fast long straights (a Formula Three car can reach a top speed of 260 km/h at the end of this stretch) and uphill-downhill twists, it has been known as one of the most demanding circuit in the world. Every year hundreds of racing drivers and riders from the world gather in the enclave and fight for glory in this circuit. Since the event was upgraded from Formula Atlantic to Formula Three, the Macau Grand Prix has become a stepping stone for future Formula One drivers, as it has always been a stage for competitions between newly crowned Formula 3 champions from Britain, Europe, Japan and other Formula 3 championships. Famous drivers include Ayrton Senna, Michael Schumacher, Mika Häkkinen, David Coulthard, Ralf Schumacher, Lewis Hamilton etc.

Due to the historical value of the event and its substantial contribution to Macau's tourism industry, a museum named the Grand Prix Museum has been established as a place where fans can recapture their fond memories of the event's past and present. More than 20 racing cars which have been driven by world-renowned names in the motorsport world, electric-operated motor cars, racing accessories and videos related to the Grand Prix are displayed in the museum. Visitors can capture the history of motor-racing in Macau in the past 40 years. The museum also displays many historical pictures of breathtaking races in the past, and two racing simulators are provided for visitors to have a feel of racing.

==== FIVB Volleyball Grand Prix ====
The FIVB Volleyball Women's Nations League is known as one of the major international sports events being held in Macau annually.

Macau was granted the right to host a round of the FIVB Volleyball Grand Prix series in 1994 for the first time and since then Macau has held the event annually except in 2003 and 2004 when the venue, Macau Forum, was under renovation for the 2005 East Asian Games. Macau was also the venue for the 2001 Final.

==== Macau Open (Golf) ====
The Macau Open is a professional golf tournament which is held in May each year since 1998 and is one of the rounds of the Asian Tour. It is played at the Macau Golf and Country Club situated at Coloane, Macau. Famous winners include Lee Westwood (1999 Champion) and Colin Montgomerie (2003 Champion).

==== Macau Open (Squash) ====
The Macau Open is a squash tournament held in Macau in October. It is part of the PSA World Tour and the WSA World Tour.

==== Macau Open Badminton Championships ====
The Macau Open Badminton Championships is an open international championship in badminton held in Macau since 2006. It is held at either the Tap Seac Multi-sports Pavilion, the Cotai Arena or the Macau Forum. In 2007, the tournament was categorised by the Badminton World Federation as Grand Prix Gold level event, which carried a total prize money of US$120,000.

==== Macau International Marathron ====
The Macau International Marathon is held in December every year. There are three categories in the competition: the Marathron, the Half Marathron and the Mini Marathron. The inaugural edition of the event was held in 1981 with a route that ran through Macao, Taipa and Coloane. The first race had more than 400 participants. The quote for all races is currently 12,000.

=== One-off events ===
==== 2007 Asian Indoor Games ====
The right to host the second edition of the spectacular Asian Indoor Games in 2007 was granted to Macau at the Olympic Council of Asia (OCA) General Assembly Meeting, which was held in Kuwait on 24 January 2003. At the same meeting, the locally designed emblem of the Macau 2007, second Asian Indoor Games was also unanimously approved. The Olympic Council of Asia (OCA) has established the Asian Indoor Games as a competition that will take place every two years and will introduce certain kinds of sports with TV broadcasting potential but not necessarily competed in the traditional Asian Games or Olympic Games. The competition program was composed of six to eight kinds of sports with strong television appeal, including extreme sports, aerobics, acrobatics, indoor athletics, dancesport, futsal, inline hockey, finswimming, and 25 metres short course swimming. The Games were held between 26 October and 3 November 2007.

==== 2005 East Asian Games ====
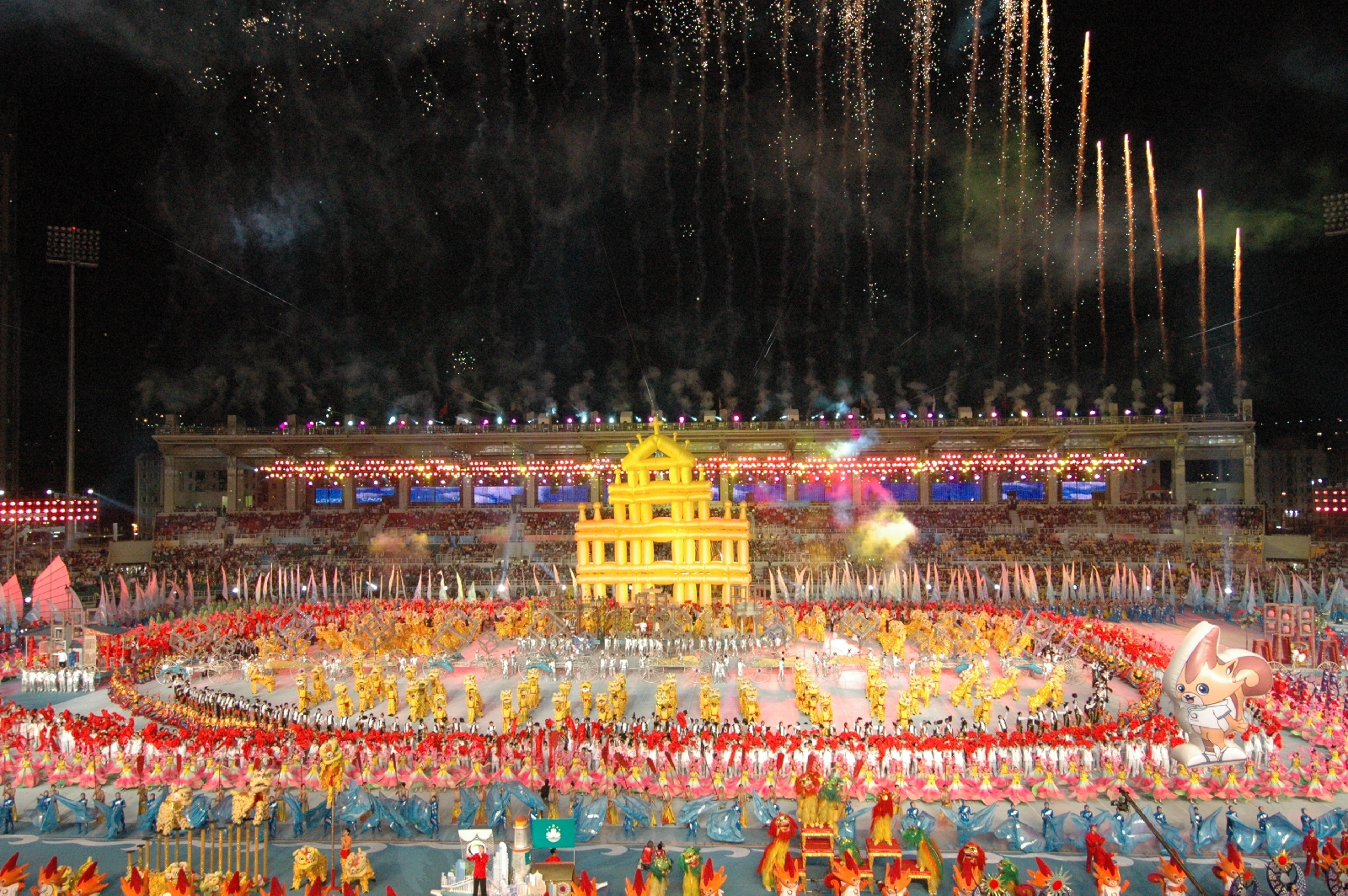
Macau Olympic Committee hosted the East Asian Games in 2005

The fourth East Asian Games Association (EAGA) Council meeting held in Guam in March 1996 awarded Macau the right to host the fourth East Asian Games. They were held between October 29, 2005, and November 6, 2005. China, Japan, South Korea, North Korea, Hong Kong, Mongolia, Chinese Taipei, Guam sent a total of more than 2,800 athletes and officials.

There were 17 sports and 235 events at the games, which included:

Aquatics, Athletics, Basketball, Bowling, Dancesport, Dragon boat, football, Gymnastics, Hockey, Rowing, Karate-do, Shooting, Soft tennis, Taekwondo, Tennis, Weightlifting, and Wushu.

By utilizing and swirling the five symbolic colors from the Olympic Rings together, the emblem of the games displayed the Olympic Spirit in a new guise. It also reflected the dynamic power of the Five Elements – metal, wood, water, fire and Earth.

The Mascot of fourth East Asian Games was a squirrel called "Pak Pak (柏柏)". "Pak Pak" comes from Macau's Guia Hill where there are many Fir trees, and is also the site of the oldest lighthouse on the Chinese coast – the Guia Lighthouse.

== Macau in International Competition ==
Macau competes separately from Mainland China in various international sporting events.

=== International football ===
Macau is a member of FIFA and participates in international competition, with men's and women's representative international sides.

=== Olympic Asian Games ===
Macau has been participating in the Olympic Asian Games since the 1990 Asian Games. They have claimed 2 golds, 11 silver and 20 bronze medals (No. 33).

=== Asian Youth Games ===
Macau won one silver medal and one bronze medal.

=== Asian Indoor Games ===
At Asian Indoor Games They have claimed 7 golds, 13 silver and 13 bronze medals (14th place).

=== East Asian Olympic Games ===
Macau has participated in every East Asian Olympic Games since 2001, being a member of the East Asian Games Association (EAGA).

=== East Asian Youth Games ===
Macau is a member of the East Asian Youth Games.

=== Portuguese-speaking olympic games ===
The first Lusophone Games (Portuguese: 1.os Jogos da Lusofonia) were held in the Macau Special Administrative Region of the People's Republic of China between 7 and 15 October 2006. Macau have claimed 16 golds, 15 silver and 33 bronze medals (4th place).

=== World Games ===
Won a bronze medal in the women's 52 kg kick boxing competition in the 2017 World Games.

=== Universiade ===
Macau won two gold medals.

=== Paralympic games ===
Macau has a National Paralympic Committee (NPC), and it is a member of the International Paralympic Committee (IPC). Macau has competed at the Paralympics since 1988.

=== Deaflympics ===
Macau has participated in the Summer Deaflympics 4 times since 2001. The country has never participated in the Winter Games.

== See also ==
- Sports and Olympic Committee of Macau
