= MUST IPO SC =

MUST IPO
- Full name: MUST IPO Sports Club
- Founded: 2008; 18 years ago (as Chao Pak Kei)
- Ground: Centro Desportivo Olímpico
- Capacity: 16,272
- Chairman: Domingos Kong
- Manager: Santiago Escudero
- League: Liga de Elite
- 2025: Liga de Elite, 1st
- Website: MUST IPO
Home colours	Away colours

MUST IPO Sports Club (Chinese: 澳科精英體育會) is a Macanese professional football club which currently competes in the Liga de Elite. The club represents the Macau University of Science and Technology (MUST).

== History ==
MUST IPO was established as Chao Pak Kei FC (Chinese: 鄒北記體育會) in 2008 by Stephen Chow, Inacio Hui and Kenneth Kwok. In 2009, MUST CPK played in the Junior Division (the current 4th Division), finishing second position and earned promotion to the 3rd Division. In 2010, MUST CPK finished third in the 3rd Division and was promoted to the 2nd Division. After finishing at 4th in 2011, MUST CPK won the title of the 2nd Division in 2012 and was promoted to the 1st Division, also known as the Liga de Elite. In their debut year, the team finished in 8th place, and in 2014, MUST CPK finished 6th place of the Liga de Elite. In 2015, MUST CPK finished in the top three for the first time, finishing 3rd in the league. In the season 2016, MUST CPK got the 5th place at the Liga de Elite and the first-runner up at the Taça de Macau. In 2017, MUST CPK again finished in 3rd place at the Liga de Elite and the fourth place at the Taça de Macau.

In 2018, MUST CPK finished first runner-up of the Liga de Elite won the Taça de Macau.

On 28 June 2019, clinched the club's first 2019 Liga de Elite title with a 4–0 victory over Ka I. As a result, MUST CPK Football Team will play in the 2020 AFC Cup. Due to the inabilities of North Korean clubs to obtain AFC club licenses, MUST CPK Football Team will enter the group stage directly. In the following 2021 and 2022 seasons, MUST CPK won the league in consecutive years, going unbeaten in both seasons. The club will also be participating in their first ever AFC Cup.

In the 2023 season, the club secured its fourth league championship, qualifying for the newly restructured continental competitions. However, despite their domestic success and significant administrative efforts, MUST CPK failed to obtain the mandatory AFC Club License required to participate in the 2024–25 AFC Challenge League. The exclusion sparked significant disappointment within the squad; veteran forward Niki Torrão publicly expressed the players' frustration, describing the administrative lockout as a major setback for the investment and progression of football in Macau.

In an official statement, the club's management acknowledged sharing a degree of responsibility for the administrative failure, but emphasized that the AFC's updated criteria presented conditions that were fundamentally beyond the structural capabilities of regions with amateur or underdeveloped football environments. Conversely, the Macau Football Association (MFA) defended the situation by stating that the newly imposed AFC regulations were excessively rigid for local club frameworks to realistically satisfy, prompting calls from CPK leadership for better future coordination between the local governing body and the AFC to protect Macau's representation on the continental stage.

In 2024, during a match between Benfica Macau U16 and Chao Pak Kei U16, Benfica Macau was winning 1–0, but the owner of Chao Pak Kei, Stephen Chow ran into the field and punched a Benfica player. CPK was then called MUST IPO. He was forced to resign as president.

In the 2024 Liga de Elite season, the club's streak of three consecutive titles came to an end, finishing as first runner-up behind champions S.L. Benfica de Macau.

The club bounced back in the 2025 season to claim another domestic league title; however, they were once again denied an AFC license for the 2026–27 AFC Challenge League cycle. This was due to ongoing administrative bottlenecks surrounding mandatory independent financial audits, requirements for AFC "A" licensed coaching staff, and youth academy structures necessary to satisfy the strict Club Licensing Administration System (CLAS) portal criteria. Local clubs officials attributed these persistent failures to a lack of local government funding and development interest in football compared to other large-scale sports in the territory. Consequently, this left eligible clubs from Macau entirely excluded from continental club competitions for the third consecutive year due to non-compliance with the shifting Asian Football Confederation standards.

The local governing bodies directly avoided public accountability regarding the systemic issue. When formal inquiries were made regarding whether any Macanese clubs had even applied for the continental licensing cycle, both the Macau Sports Bureau (MSB - ID) and the Macau Football Association (MFA - AFM) refused to provide any response.

While the governing body initially avoided public accountability regarding the systemic issue, the Macau Sports Bureau later issued a written response in June 2026 confirming that the Macau Football Association had indeed submitted applications on behalf of local clubs for level 3 licences—the lowest available tier. However, the bureau explained that because the submitted documentation did not fully comply with the continental criteria, the 2026–27 Asian licenses were officially denied, compounding the ongoing administrative friction within the local football community. Despite the anwsers from the Sports Bureau, the Macau Football Association remained silent on the matter.

== Current squad ==
Squad for 2023 Liga de Elite

Note: Flags indicate national team as defined under FIFA eligibility rules; some limited exceptions apply. Players may hold more than one non-FIFA nationality.

No.	Pos.	Nation	Player
1	GK	MAC	Ho Man Fai
2	DF	PAR	Ronaldo Cabrera
5	DF	MAC	Vítor Almeida
6	MF	BRA	Bruno Araújo
8	MF	MAC	Lei Cheng Lam
9	FW	BRA	Gregory Mendes
10	FW	MAC	Niki Torrão
13	MF	MAC	Filipe Duarte
14	MF	MAC	Leung Chi Seng
16	DF	MAC	Lei Ka Him
17	DF	MAC	Fifa Matthew McArthur

No.	Pos.	Nation	Player
20	MF	BRA	Diego Patriota
21	FW	MAC	Pang Chi Hang
23	MF	MAC	Chang Ka Chon
26	DF	MAC	Kaemon
28	MF	MAC	Martim
30	MF	MAC	Sou Leng Fong
44	MF	MAC	Alison Ian Cpuyan Cacay
47	DF	MAC	Wan Tin Iao
70	MF	MAC	Dion Carlos Choi
82	DF	MAC	Ng Ka Weng

== Honours ==
=== League ===
- Liga de Elite
  - Champions (5): 2019, 2021, 2022, 2023, 2025
- 2ª Divisão de Macau
  - Champions (1): 2012

=== Cup ===
- Taça de Macau
  - Champions (3): 2018, 2021, 2022
  - Runners-up (1): 2019

== Continental record ==
Season	Competition	Round	Club	Home	Away	Position
2023–24	AFC Cup	Group I	(Chinese Taipei) Taichung Futuro	0–1	0–1	4th
2023–24	AFC Cup	Group I	(Mongolia) FC Ulaanbaatar	0–1	0–1	4th
2023–24	AFC Cup	Group I	(Chinese Taipei) Taiwan Steel	4–1	2–4	4th
