= 2ª Divisão de Macau =

Campeonato da 2ª Divisão do Futebol
- Founded: 2005; 21 years ago
- Country: Macau
- Confederation: AFC
- Number of clubs: 10
- Level on pyramid: 2
- Promotion to: Liga de Elite
- Relegation to: 3ª Divisão de Macau
- Domestic cup: Taça de Macau
- Current champions: Gorilla of the Universe (2025)
- Website: official site
- Current: 2026 2ª Divisão de Macau

Campeonato da 2ª Divisão do Futebol (lit. '2nd Division Championship in Football'; Chinese: 澳門乙組足球聯賽) is the second division of the Macau Football Association, created in 2005. As with the Hong Kong First Division League, it is separate from the mainland Chinese football league system, including the Chinese Super League and leagues above and below it. The winner and the runner-up are promoted to the Liga de Elite and the last, the second last and the third last place team are relegated to Campeonato da 3ª Divisão do Futebol.

== 2026 Teams ==
Below are the 10 teams that will be competing in the 2026 2ª Divisão de Macau

Club	Position Last Season
Sporting Clube	Relegated (10th) from 2025 Liga de Elite
Spiny Rayed	Promoted (1st) from 2025 3ª Divisão de Macau
Cheng Loi	Promoted (2nd) from 2025 3ª Divisão de Macau
Sio Fu	Promoted (3rd) from 2025 3ª Divisão de Macau
Hong Lok	3rd
Wan Guan	4th
Toi Star	5th
Hou Seng	6th
H.C.Coloane	7th
Ka I	8th

=== Team changes ===
To Segunda Divisão/Second Division

Promoted from 2025 Terceira Divisão/Third Division

- Spiny Rayed
- Cheng Loi
- Siu Fu

Relegated from 2025 Liga de Elite/First Division

- Sporting Clube

From Segunda Divisão/Second Division

Promoted to 2026 Liga de Elite/First Division

- Gorilla of the Universe FC
- GD Artilheiros

Relegated to 2026 Terceira Divisão/Third Division

- Man Fung Hong

Resigned from league play

- Clube Atlético de Macau

== Previous Winners ==
- 2005: Hoi Fan
- 2006: League Inactive
- 2007: Cycle de Macau
- 2008: Windsor Arch Ka I
- 2009: FC Porto de Macau
- 2010: Hong Ngai
- 2011: Kuan Tai
- 2012: Chao Pak Kei
- 2013: Sporting Clube de Macau
- 2014: Casa de Portugal em Macau
- 2015: Lo Leong
- 2016: MFA Development
- 2017: Hang Sai
- 2018: Tim Iec
- 2019: Casa de Portugal em Macau
- 2020: Not held
- 2021: Sun City
- 2022: Hang Sai
- 2023: Gala FC
- 2024: Shao Jiang SA
- 2025: Gorilla of the Universe FC
