= MFA Development =

Development
- Full name: Macau Football Association Development
- Nickname(s): U-23
- Founded: 2005; 20 years ago
- Ground: Lin Fong Stadium
- Capacity: 2,000
- Chairman: Victor Cheung Lup Kwan
Home colours	Away colours

The Macau Football Association Development (Chinese: 澳門發展隊) is a Macanese football team which currently competes in the Liga de Elite. The club is run by the Macau Football Association and only fields under-23 players.

In 2018, Development participated in the 2018 Chinese Champions League though by league rules, they were not permitted to gain promotion.

== See also ==
- Sports in Macau
