= Football Association of Macau, China =

Governing body of association football in Macau

AFC
- Founded: 1939; 87 years ago
- FIFA affiliation: 1978
- AFC affiliation: 1978
- EAFF affiliation: 2002
- President: Cheung Lup Kwan
- Website: www.macaufa.com

Football Association of Macau, China
- Traditional Chinese: 中國澳門足球總會
- Simplified Chinese: 中国澳门足球总会
- Literal meaning: Football Association of Macau, China
Transcriptions
Standard Mandarin
- Hanyu Pinyin: Zhōngguó Àomén Zúqiú Zǒnghuì
- Wade–Giles: Chungkuo Aomen Tsuch'iu Tsunghui
- Tongyong Pinyin: Jhòngguó Àomén Zúcióu Zǒnghuèi
Yue: Cantonese
- Jyutping: Zung1gwok3 Ou3mun4 zeoi3kau4 jung2wui2
- IPA: [tsʊŋ˧kwɔ:k˧.ʔōumʊ̏n tsɵ̄y kɐ̏u tsʊŋwȕːi]
Southern Min
- Hokkien POJ: Tiong-kok Ò-mn̂g Chiok-kiû Chóng-hōe

The Football Association of Macau, China (Chinese: 中國澳門足球總會; Portuguese: Associação de Futebol de Macau-China) is the governing body of association football in Macau SAR of China.

== History ==
The Hong Kong–Macau Interport tournament, jointly organized by Hong Kong Football Association and Macau Football Association, has been played since 1937. Macau first entered AFC Asian Cup qualification in 1980, winning their first international match against Philippines by 2–1 at Tokyo National Stadium.

On 6 December 2018, Benfica de Macau President Duarte Alves accused the Macau Football Association of neglecting club football in favor of the Macau national football team. It is the second time in just two years that the club has been barred from participating in the AFC Cup on account of an administrative error. He said that the embarrassing situation might have been avoided if the Macau FA had been more proactive in supporting club football. Duartes further complained that he thinks that the Macau FA is simply focused on fulfilling whatever is required to get the FIFA and AFC subsidies – for example, having the various league echelons.

On 27 June 2019, the FIFA Disciplinary Committee sanctioned the Macau Football Association for failing to play the second leg of their first-round match against Sri Lanka in the AFC’s 2022 FIFA World Cup preliminary competition, due to be played on 11 June 2019. FIFA declared a 3–0 forfeit victory for Sri Lanka, with the Macau Football Association also receiving a fine of CHF 10,000.

== Association staff ==
Name	Position	Source
(Macau) Victor Cheung Lup Kwan	President	
(Macau) Chong Coc Veng	Vice-president	
(Macau) Lai Pak Leng	2nd Vice-president	
(Macau) Chan Keng Hou	General secretary	
(Macau) Benjamin Chio	Treasurer	
(Macau) Iong Cho Ieng	Technical director	
(Macau) Iong Cho Ieng	Team coach (men's)	
Zhang Hong	Team coach (women's)	
n/a	Media/communications manager	
(Macau) Lau Weng Hang	Futsal Coordinator	
(Macau) Lau Peng Wai	Referee coordinator	

== Competitions ==
=== National division ===
==== First division ====
- Liga de Elite

==== Lower divisions ====
- 2ª Divisão de Macau
- 3ª Divisão de Macau

=== National cup ===
- Taça de Macau

== See also ==
- Macau national football team
- Macau national under-17 football team
- Macau national under-20 football team
- Macau national under-23 football team
- Macau women's national football team
- Sport in Macau
