= Taça de Macau =

- Region: Macau
- Teams: 9
- Current champions: Benfica de Macau (2025)
- 2026 Taça de Macau

Taça de Macau em Futebol (Chinese: 澳門足總盃), also known as the Macau FA Cup, is the top football knockout tournament in Macau.

== List of finals ==
List of Taça de Macau winners
Year	Winners	Score	Runners-up
1951	Sporting Clube de Macau		
1952–1964	not known		
1965	Macao Post Office	2–1	Marine Club
1966–2006	not known		
2007	Polícia	0–0 (1–0 p)	Monte Carlo
2008	Hoi Fan	2–1	Monte Carlo
2009	Windsor Arch Ka I	2–0	Hoi Fan
2010	Windsor Arch Ka I	4–4 (Ka I on pen)	Lam Pak
2011	apparently not played		
2012	Lam Pak	2–1	C.D. Monte Carlo
2013	Benfica de Macau	1–0	Windsor Arch Ka I
2014	Benfica de Macau	2–0	Monte Carlo
2015	Windsor Arch Ka I	3–2	Benfica de Macau
2016	Windsor Arch Ka I	0–0 (4–3 p)	Chao Pak Kei
2017	Benfica de Macau	8–1	Monte Carlo
2018	Chao Pak Kei	5–1	Cheng Fung
2019	Cheng Fung	2–2 (3–1 p)	Chao Pak Kei
2020	not held		
2021	Chao Pak Kei	0–0 (6–5 p)	Cheng Fung
2022	Chao Pak Kei	4–1	Monte Carlo
2023	Monte Carlo	2–2 (4–1 p)	Benfica de Macau
2024	Gala	2–0	Benfica de Macau
2025	Cheng Fung	2–6	Benfica de Macau
