= G.D. Lam Pak =

Lam Pak
- Full name: Grupo Desportivo de Lam Pak
- Ground: Campo Desportivo da UCTM & Estádio Campo Desportivo; Macau
- Capacity: 1,684 & 15,490
- League: Campeonato da 1ª Divisão do Futebol
- 2012: 4th
Home colours	Away colours

Grupo Desportivo de Lam Pak (Chinese: 藍白體育會) is a Macau professional football club, which plays in the town of Macau. They play in the Macau's first division, the Campeonato da 1ª Divisão do Futebol. Lam Pak is one of the strong teams in Macau. They had been withdrawn due to financial reasons.

== Achievements ==
- Macau Championship: 9

1992, 1994, 1997, 1998, 1999, 2001, 2006, 2007, 2009

- Taça de Macau: 1

2012

== Continental record ==
Season	Competition	Round	Club	Home	Away	Aggregate
1993–94	Asian Cup Winners' Cup	First round	(China) Dalian Haichang	0–3^{1}	0–5	0–9
1997–98	Asian Club Championship	First round	(Thailand) Sinthana	0–2	1–7	1–9
2000–01	Asian Club Championship	First round	(Hong Kong) Happy Valley	0–5	0–7	0–12

^{1} Lam Pek withdrew after the first leg.

== Players ==
=== Current squad ===
Season 2012.

Note: Flags indicate national team as defined under FIFA eligibility rules; some limited exceptions apply. Players may hold more than one non-FIFA nationality.

No.	Pos.	Nation	Player
1	GK	MAC	Fong Chi Hang
4	FW	CHN	Zheng Jian
6	FW	MAC	Leong Chon In
7	DF	MAC	Chiang Ka Chon
8	MF	MAC	Che Chi Man
9	FW	MAC	Lee Keng Pan
11	FW	MAC	Ho Man Hou
12	FW	MAC	Plíneo Sousa
16	GK	MAC	Tai Chou Tek
17	DF	MAC	Pedro Da Amada Izidro
18	MF	CHN	Zeng Qixiang

No.	Pos.	Nation	Player
19	FW	MAC	Chan Man Hei
21	GK	MAC	Tai Chou Tek
27	FW	ENG	Vigan Qehaja
29	MF	MAC	Vernon
58	DF	MAC	Lam Ka Pou
60	FW	NGA	Emmanuel John
70	MF	HKG	Yiu Hok Man
71	MF	HKG	Yeung Hei Chi
77	DF	MAC	Emmanuel Noruega
—	DF	MAC	Borges
—	DF	CHN	Liang Shiming
