= Sporting Clube de Macau =

Sporting Macau
- Full name: Sporting Clube de Macau
- Nickname: Macau Lions / Macau Lionesses
- Founded: 1926; 100 years ago
- Chairman: Ernesto Santos
- Manager: José Ferreira
- League: Liga de Elite
- 2025: Liga de Elite, 10th (Relegated)
| Home colours | Away colours |

Sporting Clube de Macau (Chinese: 澳門士砵亭體育會), commonly known as Sporting Macau or just Sporting (Chinese: 士砵亭) is a Macanese professional football club that competes in the Liga de Elite. It was founded in 1926 as a branch of Sporting Clube de Portugal.

== History ==
=== Beginnings ===
The Sporting Clube de Macau (English: Macau Sporting Club) was founded on 22 September 1926 as the 25th branch of Sporting Clube de Portugal. It began under the direction of President Henrique Nolasco da Silva, Secretary Francisco Borralho, Treasurer Angelo Rosary, and alternates Dr. Horacio Carvalho, Pedro Pereira Leite, and Mário Ribeiro.

Among its past Presidents were athletes such as António Conceição, the first Macanese athlete to become Portuguese National Champion of 5x80 meters velocity relay races in 1928 and 1930.

He would return to Macau in the late 1930s and would be Macau team coach and in 1951 become President of the club. In this position, he would send Augusto Rocha and Joaquim Pacheco to Sporting, where they would be selected for the Portugal national football team.

=== Golden Era ===
The Macau Sporting Club was reactivated a second time by António Conceição, Adelino Serra, Major Acacio Cabrera Henriques, and Mario Abreu, among others in 1951 after a certain period of erasure.

In the 1960s Eduardo Atraca played for Sporting Clube de Macau and in the 1980s he would become the President of the club. Sporting became champions of Macau during this time.

In the 1990s it was the turn of Fernando Lopes to be President, leading the team to become champions of Macau once again.

The Macau Sporting Club had, in the 80s, when the club was chaired by Eduardo Atraca, a great football team. It was this club that reached the Sporting players like Rock . Club members included the two that reactivated the Club in 1951 and the two presidents of the club, and the son of António Conceição, António Conceição Júnior.

The vicissitudes of life led the club to sleep for another 20 years.

=== Reactivation ===
On 4 June 2008, António Conceição Júnior set the challenge of reviving Branch 25 of Sporting Clube de Portugal, as a way to honor his father, António Conceição Sr.

One of the first projects undertaken was the identification of Sportinguistas in the territory of the Macao Special Administrative Region. Working at full speed, on 25 November 2008, a historic Extraordinary General Meeting was held. This meeting marked an important step in the reactivation of the branch, where new members were admitted, and elections for the governing bodies were scheduled.

On 15 February 2009, elections were held, with 40 of the 54 eligible members casting their votes. In 2009, Sporting was officially reactivated and grew to include more than 100 members. António Conceição Júnior has served as president since 2009.

On 5 June 2009, nearly a year after the challenge to revive the club began, a new General Assembly was held to approve updated statutes, as the previous version dated back to 10 March 1951. Subsequently, the updated statutes were published in the Official Gazette, formalising the club’s registration with the Institute of Sport and the Macau Football Association.

The club received a significant boost with the creation of a football team that debuted on 19 August 2009 in the championship of the 2nd Division of football. The format was seven-a-side football played with a size 4 ball. This competition, which all new teams were required to enter, included 92 clubs and 18 groups. Paulo Conde and Mandinho offered their services to support the club.

In November 2010, Agostinho Caetano became the team’s coach.

In December 2011, the club achieved promotion to the 2nd Division of Macau Football after finishing as runners-up in the 3rd Division.

In 2013, the club achieved promotion to the 1st Division of Macau Football, the Liga de Elite. Although initially preparing for the 2nd Division, the withdrawal of another club allowed Sporting Clube de Macau to rise to the top flight.

== Board of directors ==
- President: TBA
- Vice-president: TBA
- Director of Football: TBA
- Treasurer: TBA

== Honours ==
- Liga de Elite
  - Champions (4): 1950, 1962, 1963, 1991
  - Runners-up (1): 2014
- 2nd Division
  - Champions (1): 2013
- Taça de Macau em Futebol
  - Champions (1): 1951

== Current squads ==
Squad for the 2025 Liga de Elite

Note: Flags indicate national team as defined under FIFA eligibility rules; some limited exceptions apply. Players may hold more than one non-FIFA nationality.

| No. | Pos. | Nation | Player |
|---|---|---|---|
| 1 | GK | MAC | Travis Cheong |
| 6 | MF | MAR | Hassan Taouchikht |
| 7 | MF | MAC | Casper Lam |
| 9 | MF | MAC | George Chao |
| 10 | MF | MAC | Jack Wu |
| 11 | DF | MAC | Marco Kuok |
| 12 | MF | MAC | Parker Wu |
| 13 | MF | MAC | Everton Cruz |
| 23 | DF | MAC | Cosmo Ho |
| 26 | MF | MAC | Fernandinho Correia |

| No. | Pos. | Nation | Player |
|---|---|---|---|
| 28 | DF | HKG | Paul Mo |
| 30 | MF | MAC | Heng Yu |
| 31 | MF | MAC | Kuma Tang |
| 35 | DF | KOR | Chanwon Hwang |
| 42 | FW | MAC | Adam Tam |
| 50 | FW | MAC | Hoi Him Ma |
| 77 | DF | MAC | Man Cheang |
| 91 | DF | RUS | Light Belov |
| 97 | DF | MAC | Alex Quartermain |
| 99 | GK | MAC | Angelo Vasco |

=== Staff ===
| Position | Name |
|---|---|
| Head coach | (Macau) José Ferreira |
| Assistant coach | (Hong Kong) Ken Chiu |
| Assistant coach | (Macau) António Cabral |
| Assistant coach | (Macau) Sam Leong |
| Assistant coach | (Macau) Kalon Kuok |
| Doctor | (Macau) Sam Hong |

Squad for the 2024 Macau Women's Futsal League

Note: Flags indicate national team as defined under FIFA eligibility rules; some limited exceptions apply. Players may hold more than one non-FIFA nationality.

| No. | Pos. | Nation | Player |
|---|---|---|---|
| 3 | Ala | MAC | Mizko Chio |
| 4 | Ala | MAC | Inês Cheung |
| 8 | Pivot | MAC | Claveria Carter |
| 10 | Ala | MAC | Inês Che |
| 12 | Ala | MAC | Chon Lao |
| 13 | Ala | MAC | Wawa Si Tou |
| 15 | Ala | MAC | Mariana Raminhos |
| 16 | Ala | MAC | Cindy Lei |
| 21 | Fixo | MAC | Ashley Chan |
| 23 | Fixo | MAC | Daniela Guerreiro |
| 24 | Guarda-Redes | MAC | Janice Leong |
| 26 | Fixo | MAC | Naomi Carter |
| 30 | Pivot | MAC | Bo Chan |

=== Staff ===
| Position | Name |
|---|---|
| Head coach | (Macau) José Ferreira |
| Assistant coach | (Macau) Mariano Luz |
| Doctor | (Macau) Sam Hong |

== Partnership ==
On 2 September 2014, Sporting Clube de Macau announced a partnership with FC Osaka, which makes the transfer of players between Macau and Japan possible.
