= Centro Desportivo Olímpico – Estádio =

Building in Taipa, Macau

Coordinates: 22°09′16″N 113°33′12″E

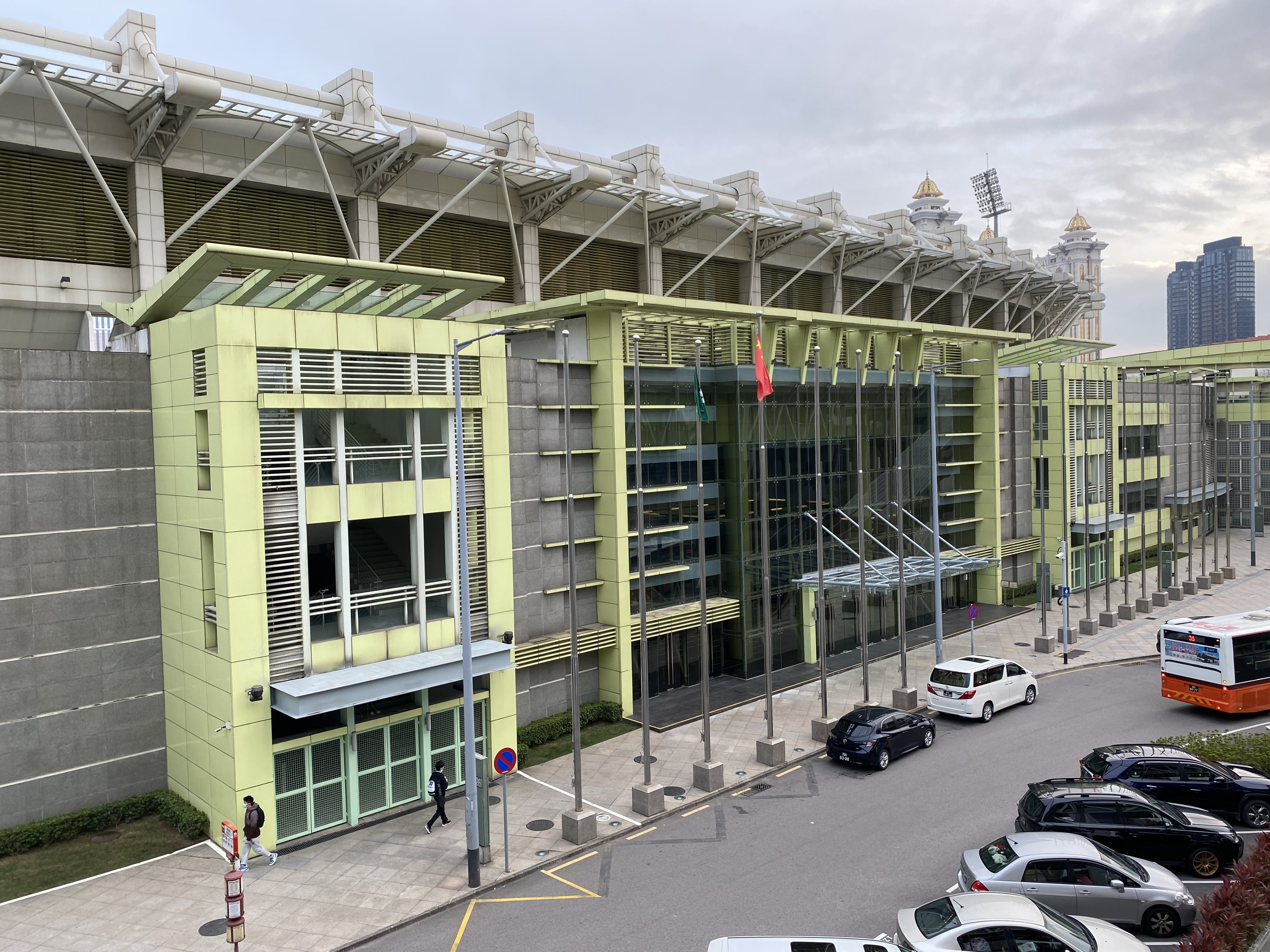
- The stadium of the Olympic Sports Centre complex in Taipa, Macau
- Interactive map of Centro Desportivo Olímpico – Estádio
- Address: Ave. Olímpica; Taipa, Macau
- Owner: Government of Macau
- Capacity: 16,270
- Surface: Grass; 105m x 68m
- Public transit: Taipa Estádio

Construction
- Opened: 1995
- Renovated: 2005

Tenants
- Macau national football team Macau national rugby union team Benfica de Macau; Liga de Elite (various clubs, selected matches)

Centro Desportivo Olímpico – Estádio
- Traditional Chinese: 奧林匹克體育中心—運動場
- Literal meaning: Olympic Sports Center – Stadium
Transcriptions
Standard Mandarin
- Hanyu Pinyin: Àolínpǐkè Tǐyù Zhōngxīn—Yùndòngchǎng
Yue: Cantonese
- Jyutping: ou3 lam4 pat1 hak1 tai2 juk6 zung1 sam1—wan6 dung6 coeng4

Estádio Campo Desportivo
- Traditional Chinese: 澳門運動場
- Literal meaning: Macau Stadium
Transcriptions
Standard Mandarin
- Hanyu Pinyin: Àomén Yùndòngchǎng
Yue: Cantonese
- Yale Romanization: ou mùhn wahn duhng chèuhng
- Jyutping: ou3 mun4 wan6 dung6 coeng4

Centro Desportivo Olímpico – Estádio (Chinese: 奧林匹克體育中心—運動場) is a multi-purpose stadium in Taipa, Macau. It was formerly named Estádio Campo Desportivo (澳門運動場) before the reconstruction of the stadium had been completed.

The stadium is part of the Olympic Sports Center in Taipa, which is the largest sporting complex in Macau. The complex comprises the stadium – a grass pitch (105 x 68 m) surrounded by an 8-lane athletic track and a long jump area, a 900-seated indoor stadium, a hockey centre, a practicing track and several tennis courts. In general, it is used mostly for football matches and athletics.

== 2005 reconstruction ==
The stadium has been under major overhaul including the reconstruction of the East and West Stand in order to increase its capacity for the 2005 East Asian Games. Prior to reconstruction the West Stand was the only part of the stadium with a roof, with the rest of them being open-air. The renewed stadium now has a capacity of around 16,272.

== Tenants ==
The stadium has become the home ground of the Macau football team since its completion and has been a major venue for local athletic and football competitions including the Liga de Elite.

== Notable football matches ==
After reconstruction it has held several high-profiled friendly matches such as China vs. Portugal in 2002, Barcelona vs. Shenzhen in 2005, Manchester United vs. Shenzhen in 2007, Chelsea F.C. vs. Guangzhou Pharmaceutical, Southampton F.C. vs. Guangzhou R&F in 2019.

On 5 September 2018, AFC announced that the stadium would host the 2018 AFC Champions League quarter final second leg between China's Tianjin Quanjian and Japan's Kashima Antlers on September 18.

=== Team ===
25 May 2002 Friendly	China	0–2	Portugal	Taipa
20:00 UTC+8			Nuno Gomes 50'; Pauleta 61'	Stadium: Estádio Campo Desportivo (Taipa); Attendance: 18,000; Referee: Kwon Jong-chul (South Korea)

17 March 2015 2018 FIFA World Cup qualification	Macau	1–1	Cambodia	Taipa
20:00 UTC+8	Leong Ka Hang 52' (pen.)	Report (FIFA); Report (AFC)	Thierry Bin 28'	Stadium: Estádio Campo Desportivo (Taipa); Attendance: 1,000; Referee: Yaqoob Abdul Baki (Oman)

29 August 2018 Friendly	Macau	1–4	Solomon Islands	Taipa
12:30 UTC+8	Lam Ka Seng 75'		Judd Molea 39'; Atkin Kaua 47'; Alvin Hou 52'; Benjamin Totori 61'	Stadium: Estádio Campo Desportivo (Taipa)

=== Club ===
7 March 2018 2018 AFC Cup Group I	Benfica de Macau	3–2	(Chinese Taipei) Hang Yuen	Estádio Campo Desportivo, Macau
20:00 UTC+8	Nguema 49'; Leonel 61', 64'	Live Report; Stats Report	Chen Ching-hsuan 19', 34'	Attendance: 1,200; Referee: Shukri Al-Hunfush (Saudi Arabia)

25 April 2018 2018 AFC Cup Group I	Benfica de Macau	0–2	(North Korea) April 25	Estádio Campo Desportivo, Macau
20:00 UTC+8			An Il-bom 24', 31' (pen.)	Attendance: 550; Referee: Omar Mohamed Al-Ali (United Arab Emirates)

16 May 2018 2018 AFC Cup Group I	Benfica de Macau	3–0	(North Korea) Hwaebul	Estádio Campo Desportivo, Macau
19:00 UTC+8	Leonel 42', 63', 82' (pen.)			Attendance: 350; Referee: Shaun Evans (Australia)

18 September 2018 2018 AFC Champions League knockout stage QF3.2	Tianjin Quanjian (China)	0–3	(Japan) Kashima Antlers	Estádio Campo Desportivo, Macau
19:30 UTC+8			Serginho 13'; Abe 27'; Doi 66'	Attendance: 8,718; Referee: Chris Beath (Australia)

23 July 2019 Torneio Internacional de Futebol de Macau por Convite em Comemoração do 20.º Aniversário do Estabelecimento da RAEM	Guangzhou R&F (China)	0–4	(England) Southampton FC	Estádio Campo Desportivo, Macau
19:30 UTC+8		Report	C Adams 1'; S Long 19'; Y Valery 19'; C Klarer 90+1'

27 July 2019 2019 International Super Cup	Inter Milan (Italy)	1–1 (6–5 p)	(France) Paris St. Germain	Estádio Campo Desportivo, Macau
19:30 UTC+8	S Longo 90+4'	Report	T Kehrer 41'	Attendance: 8,859

== See also ==
- Sport in Macau

Preceded by Nagai Stadium; Osaka	East Asian Games Football tournament Final Venue; 2005	Succeeded by Hong Kong Stadium; Hong Kong
Preceded by Nagai Stadium; Osaka	East Asian Games Athletics competitions Main Venue; 2005	Succeeded by Tseung Kwan O Sports Ground; Hong Kong
