= S.L. Benfica de Macau =

Benfica Macau
- Full name: Casa do Sport Lisboa e Benfica em Macau 澳門賓菲加體育會
- Nickname: BDM
- Founded: 17 October 1951 (75 years ago)
- Ground: Macau Olympic Complex Stadium
- Capacity: 16,272
- Chairman: Duarte Alves
- Head coach: André Calado
- League: Liga de Elite
- 2025 Liga de Elite: Liga de Elite, 4th place
- Website: www.benficamacau.com
Home colours	Away colours

The House of Sport Lisboa e Benfica in Macau (Chinese: 澳門賓菲加體育會; Portuguese: Casa do Sport Lisboa e Benfica em Macau), simply known as Benfica de Macau, is a Macanese professional football club that currently competes in the Liga de Elite. The club plays its home games at the Macau Olympic Complex Stadium.

Benfica de Macau have won six league titles and three Taça de Macau cups.

== History ==
Benfica de Macau was founded on 17 October 1951, as the House No. 232 of S.L. Benfica.

On 21 August 2016, Benfica de Macau defeated Guam club Rovers 4–2 in a 2017 AFC Cup Play-off qualifier in Bishkek. It was the first win ever for a Macanese club in any AFC competition.

In 2018, Benfica de Macau became the first Macanese club to participate in the AFC Cup group stage. On 7 March 2018, Benfica won 3–2 against Taiwan's Hang Yuen, becoming the first Macanese club to win an AFC group stage match.

After a six-year title drought, Benfica de Macau secured the 2024 season league title, positioning the club to qualify for the second edition of the newly established third-tier continental tournament, the AFC Challenge League. However, systemic infrastructure issues within local football had already complicated the territory's regional standing; during the competitive season in June 2024, club president Duarte Alves expressed major frustration over the ongoing exclusion of Macanese clubs from AFC tournaments, publicly citing the tightening, increasingly rigid criteria imposed by the Asian Football Confederation on amateur and semi-professional structures.

Alves specifically highlighted that mandatory club demands: such as operating independent financial audits, employing specialized coaching staff with an AFC "A" license, and maintaining robust multi-tier youth academies, remained largely out of reach due to a systemic lack of local government funding and developmental interest in football compared to other heavily sponsored, large-scale sporting events in Macau. This ongoing structural bottleneck ultimately meant that despite securing the 2024 championship, the club failed to obtain the mandatory AFC Club License. This left the territory's top clubs entirely excluded from the subsequent AFC Challenge League tournament cycle for the second consecutive year, mirroring the prior administrative issues that had previously hindered the association's teams in past competitive eras.

== Continental history ==
Season	Competition	Round	Club	Home	Away	Position
2016	AFC Cup	Qualifying Round	(Kyrgyzstan) Alga Bishkek	0–2		3rd
2016	AFC Cup	Qualifying Round	(Bangladesh) Sheikh Jamal Dhanmondi	1–4		3rd
2017	AFC Cup	Qualifying Round	(Guam) Rovers	4–2		2nd
2017	AFC Cup	Qualifying Round	(Kyrgyzstan) Dordoi Bishkek	1–2		2nd
2018	AFC Cup	Group I	(Chinese Taipei) Hang Yuen	3–2	4–1	2nd
2018	AFC Cup	Group I	(North Korea) Hwaebul SC	3–0	3–2	2nd
2018	AFC Cup	Group I	(North Korea) April 25	0–2	0–8	2nd

== Players ==
Current squad for the 2026 Liga de Elite

Note: Flags indicate national team as defined under FIFA eligibility rules; some limited exceptions apply. Players may hold more than one non-FIFA nationality.

No.	Pos.	Nation	Player
1	GK	MAC	Ka-Heng Ng
4	FW	MAC	Man-Hin Lo
5	DF	GAB	Gilchrist Nguema
9	FW	MAC	Hou-In Leong
10	FW	MAC	Niki Torrão
11	DF	MAC	Iuri Capelo
12	MF	MAC	Pak-Lam Wu
12	MF	MAC	Ka-Chon Cheng

No.	Pos.	Nation	Player
15	FW	MAC	Danaël Estadieu
17	MF	MAC	Chi-Hou Chao
21	FW	CPV	Alison Brito
24	MF	GAB	Nathanael Mbourou
26	DF	MAC	Amancio
43	GK	MAC	Weng-Hou Lo
88	MF	MAC	Chi-Him Chao

== Honours ==
=== League ===
- Liga de Elite
  - Champions (7): 2014, 2015, 2016, 2017, 2018, 2020, 2024

=== Cup ===
- Taça de Macau
  - Champions (4): 2013, 2014, 2017, 2025
  - Runners-up (3): 2015, 2023, 2024
