= Windsor Arch Ka I =

Ka I
- Full name: Associação Desportiva Ka I
- Founded: 1985; 41 years ago
- Ground: Lin Fong Stadium
- Capacity: 2,000
- Chairman: Eduardo Fong Tze Cheong
- Manager: Adriano Lee Pak Wai
- League: Liga de Elite
- 2024: Liga de Elite, 10th
Home colours	Away colours

Ka I Athletic Association (Chinese: 加義體育會; Portuguese: Associação Desportiva Ka I) are a Macanese professional football club that competes in the Liga de Elite.

== History ==
Founded in Taipa in 1985 under the name Associacão Desportiva Ka I, the club has seven titles to its name: three Liga de Elite titles and four Taça de Macau. They have been one of the best clubs in Macau since their debut in Liga de Elite in 2009.

Led by Japanese midfielder Dan Ito, the club made their debut in Liga de Elite in 2009 season, where they managed to finish in second place in the standings, just behind Lam Pak, while winning their first trophy, Taça de Macau. It continued in 2010 season with a Cup-Championship double and in 2011 season the club became champion for the third consecutive year. The club changes its name before the start of the 2016 season to become Tak Chun Ka I, after about a year known as Windsor Arch Ka I.

Despite its many national titles, the club have so far never taken part in an Asian competition as Macau does not field any team in competitions managed by the AFC then.

As of 2018 season the club became known again as Ka I.

In 2019, the club playing in the 2019 Taça de Macau was disqualified along with Hang Sai for protesting Macau's forfeit against Sri Lanka as a 2022 FIFA World Cup qualifier after the Macau FA's refused their national football team to travel to Sri Lanka to play their second-leg match due to terrorist reasons, which resulted by a 21-18 win for Ka I and a advance to quarter-finals. Due to this controversial match, Ka I and Hang Sai apologized for their gestures but were disqualified from the Macau FA Cup and Chao Pak Kei receive a bye and advance to semi-finals.

== Honours ==
=== League ===
- Liga de Elite
  - Champions (3): 2010, 2011, 2012.

=== Cup ===
- Taça de Macau
  - Champions (4): 2009, 2010, 2015, 2016
  - Runners-up: 2013

== Current squad ==
Squad for the 2020 Liga de Elite

Note: Flags indicate national team as defined under FIFA eligibility rules; some limited exceptions apply. Players may hold more than one non-FIFA nationality.

No.	Pos.	Nation	Player
2	DF	MAC	Leong Lap Tak
3	DF	HKG	Lin Junsheng
4	DF	MAC	Wong Kit Wai
5	DF	CHN	Tan Guohui
6	DF	MAC	Lao Pak Kin
7	FW	MAC	Lo Man Hin
8	MF	CHN	He Yihui
9	FW	MAC	Chan Kin Seng
10	MF	CHN	Chen Qian
11	FW	MAC	Mak Hou Wai
12	FW	MAC	Ho Chi Fong
13	DF	MAC	Mok Tsa Yeung
14	DF	MAC	Sio Kam Wang
15	MF	CHN	Wang Jing

No.	Pos.	Nation	Player
16	MF	MAC	Wong Weng Hei
17	MF	MAC	Kong Cheng Hou
18	MF	MAC	Choi Keng Sang
19	FW	MAC	Chan Chon Fong
20	GK	MAC	Lo Weng Hou
21	DF	MAC	Ip Ieong
22	MF	MAC	Si Tou Seng Hang
24	MF	MAC	Ku Koi Fai
26	DF	MAC	Lau Pak Meng
28	MF	MAC	Lei Ka Kei
29	MF	MAC	Vernon Wong
30	FW	CHN	Liang Zheyu
32	FW	MAC	Leong Tak Wai

== Former managers ==
- (Macau) Rui Cardoso

== See also ==
- Ka I 21–18 Hang Sai
