= Liga de Elite =

Top tier association football league in Macau

- Founded: 1973; 53 years ago
- Country: Macau
- Confederation: AFC
- Number of clubs: 10
- Level on pyramid: 1
- Relegation to: 2ª Divisão de Macau
- Domestic cup: Taça de Macau
- International cup: AFC Challenge League
- Current champions: Shao Jiang SA (1st title) (2026)
- Most championships: Lam Pak (9 titles)
- Top scorer: William Carlos Gomes (220 goals)
- Broadcaster(s): FIFA+
- Website: macaufa.com
- Current: 2026 Liga de Elite

Liga de Elite (lit. 'Elite League'; Chinese: 澳門甲組足球聯賽), previously known as Campeonato da 1ª Divisão do Futebol, is the top division of the Macau Football Association. Created in 1973, it features both local amateur players and professional foreign talent.

Due to the limited land area in Macau, matches are played almost exclusively at the Estádio Campo Desportivo and the Lin Fong Sports Centre. Similar to Hong Kong, the league operates under a separate system from the Mainland Chinese football league system. The season typically runs from January to July.

== History ==
=== Origins and early years ===
The league was founded in 1973. Historically, the competition was dominated by Lam Pak, who won a record 8 titles before withdrawing from the league. Other notable historical champions include Polícia and Hap Kuan.

=== 2014 restructuring and withdrawals ===
The league underwent significant turbulence leading into the 2014 season. Established powerhouses Lam Pak, Lam Ieng, and Kuan Tai all forfeited their places in the First Division before the start of the competition. Lam Pak and Lam Ieng withdrew due to a lack of sponsorship, while Kuan Tai cited budget issues and an inability to pay players.

To address the sudden vacancies, the Macau Football Association invited the two clubs relegated in 2013, Kei Lun and MFA Development, to remain in the top flight.

=== Modern era ===
In recent years, the league has been defined by the rise of Benfica de Macau and Chao Pak Kei/MUST IPO. Benfica de Macau achieved international recognition by becoming the first Macanese club to participate in the AFC Cup group stage in 2018, where they secured historic victories over Hang Yuen of Taiwan. Chao Pak Kei dominated the league post-2019, securing three consecutive titles (2019, 2021, 2022) often with unbeaten records.

Despite this domestic growth, the league entered a period of international isolation following the Asian Football Confederation's (AFC) club competition restructuring and the introduction of the new third-tier competition, the AFC Challenge League. Although 2023 champions MUST CPK, 2024 winners Benfica de Macau, and 2025 champions MUST IPO (previously MUST CPK) earned the sporting right to represent the territory in Asia, all subsequent domestic winners failed to obtain the mandatory AFC Club License.

Local clubs presidents publicly attributed these persistent administrative failures to the increasingly rigid criteria of the AFC's Club Licensing Administration System (CLAS), which mandates independent financial audits, specialized coaching credentials, and structured youth systems, paired with a systemic lack of local government funding for football development compared to other high-profile sports in Macau. This structural bottleneck resulted in a consecutive three-year absence from continental competitions for Liga de Elite clubs, leaving the association's allocated slots in the preliminary playoff stage completely vacant.

=== Licensing controversies and criticism ===
The three consecutive years of licensing failures sparked widespread frustration among local players, staff, and club executives, evolving into a broader controversy regarding the governance of the sport in Macau. Following MUST CPK's exclusion from the 2024–25 AFC Challenge League, veteran forward Niki Torrão publicly voiced the squad's disillusionment, emphasizing that the team's massive domestic efforts and financial investments were being actively undermined by administrative failures, ultimately leaving local football as the primary loser.

The crisis also exposed significant friction between local clubs and the Macau Football Association (MFA). While the governing body publicly defended local clubs by claiming the AFC's updated criteria were simply too rigid for Macau's unique amateur framework to satisfy, substantial criticism emerged from within the local football community. Rumors and reports circulating within local football circles alleged that the MFA had failed to proactively coordinate with the AFC or properly advocate for its member clubs during the transition to the new Club Licensing Administration System (CLAS) portal. Club officials publicly called on the association to heavily reinforce its coordination with the continental body to ensure the reality of Macau's underdeveloped football environment is factored into future competitive cycles.

The local governing bodies directly avoided public accountability regarding the systemic issue. When formal inquiries were made regarding whether any Macanese clubs had even applied for the continental licensing cycle, both the Macau Sports Bureau (MSB - ID) and the Macau Football Association (MFA - AFM) refused to provide any response.

While the governing body initially avoided public accountability regarding the systemic issue, the Macau Sports Bureau later issued a written response in June 2026 confirming that the Macau Football Association had indeed submitted applications on behalf of local clubs for level 3 licences—the lowest available tier. However, the bureau explained that because the submitted documentation did not fully comply with the continental criteria, the 2026–27 Asian licenses were officially denied, compounding the ongoing administrative friction within the local football community. Despite the anwsers from the Sports Bureau, the Macau Football Association remained silent on the matter.

== Competition format ==
The league follows a standard round-robin format where the 10 participating teams play each other twice (home and away), totaling 18 matches per team. However, due to the use of shared neutral venues, the "home" and "away" distinction is purely administrative.

- Champions: The team with the most points at the end of the season is declared the champion and qualifies for the AFC Challenge League (Teams previously qualified to AFC Cup before 2024.)
- Relegation: The bottom two teams are relegated to the 2ª Divisão de Macau.

== Clubs ==
Liga de Elite Venues
- 1 Estádio Campo Desportivo
- 2 Lin Fong Sports Centre
- 3 M.U.S.T. Stadium

=== Current clubs ===
As of the 2026 season, ten teams compete in the league.

- Benfica de Macau
- Chen Fung
- Gala
- Gorilla of the Universe
- Hang Sai
- Macau Chiba
- MUST IPO Elite
- GD Artilheiros
- Shao Jiang
- University of Macau

=== Team changes ===
To Liga de Elite/First Division

Promoted from 2025 Segunda Divisão/Second Division

- Gorilla of the Universe
- GD Artilheiros

From Liga de Elite/First Division

Relegated to 2026 Segunda Divisão/Second Division

- Sporting Clube

Resigned from league play

- Clube Desportivo Lün Lók

=== Venues ===
Unlike major professional leagues, clubs do not have their own stadiums. Matches are allocated to one of three main government-owned venues.

== Champions ==
=== List of champions ===
Season	Champions	Pos
1949	Polícia	1st
1950	Sporting de Macau	1st
1951-1953	Unknown	–
1955	Polícia	
1956	Polícia	
1962	Sporting de Macau	1st
1963	Sporting de Macau	1st
1964	Hong Lok	1st
1965	Macao Post Office	1st
1965–1972	Records not known	–
1973	Polícia	1st
1974–1984	Records not known	–
1984/85	Wa Seng	1st
1985/86	Hap Kuan	1st
1986/87	Hap Kuan	1st
1987/88	Wa Seng	1st
1988/89	Hap Kuan	1st
1989/90	Hap Kuan	1st
1990/91	Sporting de Macau	1st
1991/92	Lam Pak	1st
1992/93	Leng Ngan	1st
1993/94	GD Negro Rubro	1st
1994/95	GD Artilheiros	1st
1995/96	GD Artilheiros	1st
1996/97	Lam Pak	1st
1997/98	Lam Pak	1st
1998/99	Lam Pak	1st
1999/2000	Polícia	1st
2000/2001	Lam Pak	1st
2001/2002	Monte Carlo	1st
2002/2003	Monte Carlo	1st
2003/2004	Monte Carlo	1st
2005	Polícia	1st
2006	Lam Pak	1st
2007	Lam Pak	1st
2007/08	Monte Carlo	1st
2009	Lam Pak	1st
2010	Ka I	1st
2011	Ka I	1st
2012	Ka I	1st
2013	Monte Carlo	1st
2014	Benfica de Macau	1st
2015	Benfica de Macau	1st
2016	Benfica de Macau	1st
2017	Benfica de Macau	1st
2018	Benfica de Macau	1st
2019	Chao Pak Kei	1st
2020	Benfica de Macau	(Unofficial)
2021	Chao Pak Kei	1st
2022	Chao Pak Kei	1st
2023	Chao Pak Kei	1st
2024	Benfica de Macau	1st
2025	MUST IPO	1st
2026	Shao Jiang	1st

=== Performance by club ===
Club	Titles	Winning years
Lam Pak	8	1991/92, 1996/97, 1997/98, 1998/99, 2000/01, 2005/06, 2006/07, 2009
Benfica de Macau	6	2014, 2015, 2016, 2017, 2018, 2024
Monte Carlo	5	2001/02, 2002/03, 2003/04, 2007/08, 2013
Polícia	5	1948/49, 1954/55, 1955/56, 1972/73, 2004/05
MUST IPO	5	2019, 2021, 2022, 2023, 2025
Sporting de Macau	4	1950, 1961/62, 1962/63, 1990/91
Hap Kuan	4	1985/86, 1986/87, 1988/89, 1989/90
Ka I	3	2010, 2011, 2012
Wa Seng	2	1984/85, 1987/88
GD Artilheiros	2	1994-95, 1995/96
Hong Lok	1	1963-64
Macau Post Office	1	1964-65
Leng Ngan	1	1992-93
GD Negro Rubro	1	1993-94
Shao Jiang	1	2026

== Players ==
=== Best Player Award ===
Season	Player	Nationality	Club
2010	Geofredo Cheung	Macau	Monte Carlo
2011	Leong Ka Hang	Macau	MFA Development
2012	Cesinha Barbieri	Brazil	Ka I
2013	Leong Ka Hang	Macau	Monte Carlo
2014	Bruno Brito	Portugal	Sporting de Macau
2015	Diego Patriota	Brazil	Chao Pak Kei
2016	Chan Man	Macau	Benfica de Macau
2017	Pan Chi Hang	Macau	Benfica de Macau
2018	Diego Patriota	Brazil	Chao Pak Kei
2019	Filipe Duarte	Macau	Benfica de Macau
2020	Diego Patriota	Brazil	Chao Pak Kei
2021	Diego Patriota	Brazil	Chao Pak Kei
2022	Jackson Sousa	Brazil	Monte Carlo
2022	Niki Torrão	Macau	Chao Pak Kei
2023	Jackson Sousa	Brazil	Monte Carlo
2024	Chan Man	Macau	Benfica de Macau
2025	Sixto Lucena	VEN	Shao Jiang SA

=== Top Goalscorers ===
Season	Player	Club	Goals
2001	(Brazil) Beto	Monte Carlo	19
2005	(Macau) Cheang Chon Man	Polícia	20
2010	(Macau) Lee Keng Pan	Hoi Fan	10
2011	(Brazil) Kamilo Silva	Monte Carlo	38
2012	(Brazil) Gustavo Silveira Avelino	Ka I	17
2013	(Macau) Niki Torrão	Ka I	23
2014	(Brazil) William Carlos Gomes	Benfica de Macau	16
2015	(Brazil) William Carlos Gomes	Benfica de Macau	19
2016	(Portugal) Carlos Leonel	Benfica de Macau	24
2017	(Macau) Carlos Leonel	Benfica de Macau	21
2018	(Brazil) William Carlos Gomes	Ka I	41
2019	(Brazil) William Carlos Gomes	Cheng Fung	19
2020	(Macau) Carlos Leonel	Benfica de Macau	23
2021	(Macau) Carlos Leonel	Benfica de Macau	35
2022	(Macau) Niki Torrão	Chao Pak Kei	32
2023	(Brazil) Jackson Sousa	Monte Carlo	25
2024	(Brazil) William Carlos Gomes	Gala	22
2025	(Brazil) William Carlos Gomes	Gala	17

=== Records ===
All-time goalscorers

Rank	Player	Years	Goals	Apps	Ratio
1	(Brazil) William Carlos Gomes	2013–present	220	188	1.15
2	(Macau) Niki Torrão	2011–present	214	191	1.11
3	(Brazil) Diego Patriota	2013–present	151	165	0.92
4	(Macau) Carlos Leonel	2015–2022	117	81	1.44
