= Lei Ka Him =

Personal information
- Date of birth: 16 August 1991 (age 35)
- Place of birth: Macau
- Position: Defender

Team information
- Current team: C.P.K.

Senior career*
Years	Team	Apps	(Gls)
2007–2008	CD Os Velozes		
2010–2012	MFA Development	37	(2)
2013–2014	Monte Carlo	30	(1)
2015–2016	Lai Chi	31	(7)
2017–2018	Ka I	29	(2)
2019–	C.P.K.	17	(2)

International career^{‡}
2014–	Macau	31	(1)
- * Club domestic league appearances and goals as of 17:40, 13 March 2021 (UTC) ‡ National team caps and goals as of 17:40, 13 March 2021 (UTC)

Lei Ka Him (李家謙, born 16 August 1991) is a Macanese international footballer who plays as a defender for C.P.K. and the Macau national football team.

== Club career ==
Lei has represented numerous clubs in Macau, and has consistently played in the Liga de Elite since 2010.

== International career ==
Lei made his international debut in 2010, replacing Mok Tsa Yeung in the 60th minute of a 7-1 defeat to Chinese Taipei. He scored his first goal against the same opponent; this time a 3-2 defeat in 2016.

== Career statistics ==
=== Club ===
As of 13 March 2021.

Club	Season	League			Cup		Continental		Other		Total	
Club	Season	Division	Apps	Goals	Apps	Goals	Apps	Goals	Apps	Goals	Apps	Goals
MFA Development	2010	1ª Divisão	9	0	0	0	–		0	0	9	0
MFA Development	2011	1ª Divisão	16	0	0	0	–		0	0	16	0
MFA Development	2012	1ª Divisão	12	2	0	0	–		0	0	12	2
MFA Development	Total		37	2	0	0	0	0	0	0	37	2
Monte Carlo	2013	1ª Divisão	17	1	0	0	–		0	0	17	1
Monte Carlo	2014	1ª Divisão	13	0	0	0	–		0	0	13	0
Monte Carlo	Total		30	1	0	0	0	0	0	0	30	1
Lai Chi	2015	1ª Divisão	15	5	0	0	–		0	0	15	5
Lai Chi	2016	1ª Divisão	16	2	0	0	–		0	0	16	2
Lai Chi	Total		31	7	0	0	0	0	0	0	31	7
Ka I	2017	Liga de Elite	13	0	0	0	–		0	0	13	0
Ka I	2018	Liga de Elite	16	2	0	0	–		0	0	16	2
Ka I	Total		29	2	0	0	0	0	0	0	29	2
C.P.K.	2019	Liga de Elite	17	2	0	0	–		0	0	17	2
C.P.K.	2020	Liga de Elite	0	0	0	0	–		0	0	0	0
C.P.K.	2021	Liga de Elite	0	0	0	0	–		0	0	0	0
C.P.K.	Total		17	2	0	0	0	0	0	0	17	2
Career total			75	10	0	0	0	0	0	0	7	2

=== International ===
As of matches played 25 March 2017.

National team	Year	Apps	Goals
Macau	2010	3	0
Macau	2011	0	0
Macau	2012	2	0
Macau	2013	0	0
Macau	2014	4	0
Macau	2015	4	0
Macau	2016	9	1
Macau	2017	4	0
Macau	2018	4	0
Macau	2019	1	0
Total		31	1

No	Date	Venue	Opponent	Score	Result	Competition
1.	4 July 2016	GFA National Training Center, Dededo, Guam	Chinese Taipei	2–2	2–3	2017 East Asian Cup
