= List of football clubs in Macau =

This is a list of football clubs that play in the four levels of the Macau football league system.

== By League and Division ==
- First Division - the premier league
- Second Division
- Third Division
- preparatory Division

== Alphabetically ==
The divisions are correct for the 2025–26 season. Most teams competing in the lower division (First Division, Second Division and Third Division) do not have their own home ground. It is denoted by an "N/A" in the "Home Ground" column.

=== A ===
Club	League/Division in 2025–26	Lvl	Home Ground	Location
GD Artilheiros	First Division	N/A	N/A	N/A

=== B ===
Club	League/Division in 2025–26	Lvl	Home Ground	Location
S.L. Benfica de Macau	First Division	N/A	N/A	N/A

=== C ===
Club	League/Division in 2025–26	Lvl	Home Ground	Location
Casa de Portugal em Macau		N/A	N/A	N/A

=== H ===
Club	League/Division in 2025–26	Lvl	Home Ground	Location
Hap Kuan		N/A	N/A	N/A
Heng Tai		N/A	N/A	N/A
Hong Lok		N/A	N/A	N/A
Hong Ngai	Junior Divisão/preparatory Division	N/A	N/A	N/A

=== K ===
Club	League/Division in 2025–26	Lvl	Home Ground	Location
Kei Cheong		N/A	N/A	N/A
Kei Lun		N/A	N/A	N/A
Kuan Tai		N/A	N/A	N/A

=== L ===
Club	League/Division in 2025–26	Lvl	Home Ground	Location
Lai Chi	Third Division	N/A	N/A	N/A
Lam Ieng		N/A	N/A	N/A
G.D. Lam Pak		N/A	N/A	N/A

=== M ===
Club	League/Division in 2025–26	Lvl	Home Ground	Location
C.D. Monte Carlo		N/A	N/A	N/A
MUST IPO	First Division	N/A	N/A	N/A

=== P ===
Club	League/Division in 2025–26	Lvl	Home Ground	Location
Polícia de Segurança Pública	N/A	N/A	N/A	
F.C. Porto de Macau		N/A	N/A	N/A

=== R ===
Club	League/Division in 2025–26	Lvl	Home Ground	Location
G.D. Negro Rubro		N/A	N/A	N/A

=== S ===
Club	League/Division in 2025–26	Lvl	Home Ground	Location
Serviços de Alfândega		N/A	N/A	N/A
Sporting Clube de Macau	Second Division	N/A	N/A	N/A

=== T ===
Club	League/Division in 2025–26	Lvl	Home Ground	Location
Tim Iec	Third Division	N/A	N/A	N/A

=== V ===
Club	League/Division in 2025–26	Lvl	Home Ground	Location
Vá Luen		N/A	N/A	N/A
Vong Chiu		N/A	N/A	N/A

=== W ===
Club	League/Division in 2025–26	Lvl	Home Ground	Location
Windsor Arch Ka I	Second Division	N/A	N/A	N/A

- MFA Development (Macao U23)
