= Chan Chi Ieng =

Macanese footballer

Personal information
- Date of birth: 8 June 1993 (age 33)
- Place of birth: Macau
- Position: Midfielder

Team information
- Current team: Polícia
- Number: 24

Senior career*
Years	Team	Apps	(Gls)
2011–2012	MFA Development	22	(0)
2013–	Polícia	67	(2)

International career^{‡}
2011–2018	Macau	2	(0)
- * Club domestic league appearances and goals as of 11:44, 13 March 2021 (UTC) ‡ National team caps and goals as of 11:44, 8 June 2018 (UTC)

Chan Chi Ieng (Chinese: 陳志營; born 8 June 1993) is a Macanese footballer who currently plays as a midfielder for Polícia de Segurança Pública.

== Career statistics ==
=== Club ===
As of 13 March 2021.

Club	Season	League			Cup		Continental		Other		Total	
Club	Season	Division	Apps	Goals	Apps	Goals	Apps	Goals	Apps	Goals	Apps	Goals
MFA Development	2011	Campeonato da 1ª Divisão do Futebol	17	0	0	0	–		0	0	17	0
MFA Development	2012	Campeonato da 1ª Divisão do Futebol	5	0	0	0	–		0	0	5	0
MFA Development	Total		22	0	0	0	0	0	0	0	22	0
Polícia	2013	Campeonato da 1ª Divisão do Futebol	18	1	0	0	–		0	0	18	1
Polícia	2014	Campeonato da 1ª Divisão do Futebol	13	0	0	0	–		0	0	13	0
Polícia	2015	Campeonato da 1ª Divisão do Futebol	14	1	0	0	–		0	0	14	1
Polícia	2016	Campeonato da 1ª Divisão do Futebol	17	0	0	0	–		0	0	17	0
Polícia	2017	Liga de Elite	11	0	0	0	–		4 (Note: Appearances in the Macau Football Tournament)	0	15	0
Polícia	2018	Liga de Elite	14	0	0	0	–		0	0	14	0
Polícia	2019	Liga de Elite	10	0	0	0	–		0	0	10	0
Polícia	2020	Liga de Elite	5	0	0	0	–		0	0	5	0
Polícia	2021	Liga de Elite	1	0	0	0	–		0	0	1	0
Polícia	Total		103	2	0	0	0	0	4	0	107	2
Career total			125	2	0	0	0	0	4	0	129	2

=== International ===
As of matches played 8 June 2018.

National team	Year	Apps	Goals
Macau	2011	1	0
Macau	2018	1	0
Total		2	0
