= 2005 Campeonato da 1ª Divisão do Futebol =

1ª Divisão
- Season: 2005
- Champions: Polícia de Segurança Pública
- Matches: 56
- Goals: 216 (3.86 per match)
- Top goalscorer: Cheang Chon Man (20 goals)

Statistics of Campeonato da 1ª Divisão do Futebol in the 2005 season.

== Overview ==
Polícia de Segurança Pública won the championship.

== League standings ==
Pos	Team	Pld	W	D	L	GF	GA	GD	Pts
1	Polícia de Segurança Pública	14	10	2	2	41	12	+29	32
2	Lam Pak	14	9	2	3	37	13	+24	29
3	Monte Carlo	14	6	5	3	32	24	+8	23
4	Vá Luen	14	6	4	4	23	21	+2	22
5	Serviços de Alfândega	14	6	3	5	24	23	+1	21
6	Heng Tai	14	4	2	8	29	40	−11	14
7	Kuan Tai	14	1	5	8	17	43	−26	8
8	Kei Lun	14	2	1	11	13	40	−27	7

Source: rsssf.com
