= 2018 Taça de Macau =

Tournament details
- Country: Macau
- Teams: 10

Final positions
- Champions: Chao Pak Kei
- Runners-up: Cheng Fung

Tournament statistics
- Matches played: 10
- Goals scored: 44 (4.4 per match)

The 2018 Taça de Macau was the 2018 iteration of the Taça de Macau, the top football knockout competition in Macau.

== Bracket ==
First Round
Alfândega	1
**Hang Sai**	**3**
Polícia	0 (2)
**Monte Carlo (pen.)**	**0 (3)**

Quarter-finals
Hang Sai	0
**Chao Pak Kei**	**3**
**Benfica de Macau**	**7**
Lai Chi	0
**Cheng Fung**	**1**
Monte Carlo	0
Ka I	2
**Sporting de Macau**	**3**

Semi-finals
Benfica de Macau	3 (2)
**Chao Pak Kei (pen.)**	**3 (3)**
**Cheng Fung**	**6**
Sporting de Macau	1

Final
**Chao Pak Kei**	**5**
Cheng Fung	1

Bold = winner
* = after extra time, ( ) = penalty shootout score

== Fixtures and results ==
=== First round ===
5 July 2018	Alfândega	**1–3**	**Hang Sai**	Estádio Campo Desportivo
19:15 UTC+8		Report		Referee: Chan Jun

5 July 2018	Polícia	**1–2** (**2–3** p)	**Monte Carlo**	Estádio Campo Desportivo
21:00 UTC+8		Report		Referee: Grant

=== Quarter-finals ===
7 July 2018	**Benfica de Macau**	**7–0**	Lai Chi	Estádio Campo Desportivo
18:30 UTC+8		Report		Referee: Dias

7 July 2018	Ka I	**2–3**	**Sporting de Macau**	Estádio Campo Desportivo
20:30 UTC+8		Report		Referee: Robesh

8 July 2018	Hang Sai	**0–3 (forfeit)**	**Chao Pak Kei**	Estádio Campo Desportivo
18:30 UTC+8		Report		Referee: Chan Jun

8 July 2018	**Cheng Fung**	**1–0**	Monte Carlo	Estádio Campo Desportivo
20:30 UTC+8		Report		Referee: Ho Ka Shing

=== Semi-finals ===
12 July 2018	Benfica de Macau	**3–3** (**2–3** p)	**Chao Pak Kei**	Estádio Campo Desportivo
19:15 UTC+8		Report		Referee: Chan Jun

12 July 2018	**Cheng Fung**	**6–1**	Sporting de Macau	Estádio Campo Desportivo
21:00 UTC+8		Report		Referee: Ho Ka Shing

=== Third place match ===
15 July 2018	**Benfica de Macau**	**5–0**	Sporting de Macau	Estádio Campo Desportivo
18:30 UTC+8		Report		Referee: Ho Ka Shing

=== Final ===
15 July 2018	**Chao Pak Kei**	**5–1**	Cheng Fung	Estádio Campo Desportivo
20:30 UTC+8		Report		Referee: Chan Jun

== See also ==
- 2018 Liga de Elite
