= Alexandre Matos =

Macanese footballer

Personal information
- Full name: Alexandre Raposo de Matos
- Date of birth: 31 May 1995 (age 31)
- Place of birth: Taipa, Macau
- Height: 1.93 m (6 ft 4 in)
- Position: Striker

Team information
- Current team: Fanum Orosei

Senior career*
| Years | Team | Apps | (Gls) |
| 2012 | Ka I | 3 | (1) |
| 2013 | Lam Ieng | 11 | (1) |
| 2014 | Sporting (Macau) | 12 | (2) |
| 2015 | Ka I | 16 | (5) |
| 2015 | Greenwood Meadows | 11 | (0) |
| 2016 | Ka I | 15 | (2) |
| 2018 | C.P.K. | 15 | (5) |
| 2018–2019 | Atletico Cacém | 11 | (0) |
| 2019 | Sporting (Macau) | 7 | (4) |
| 2019–2020 | Serpa | 10 | (2) |
| 2020 | Graciosa | | |
| 2020 | Viana do Alentejo | 2 | (0) |
| 2020–2021 | Rebordelo | 9 | (5) |
| 2021 | Águias do Moradal | 0 | (0) |
| 2021 | Arganil | 11 | (11) |
| 2021–2022 | Mazara | | |
| 2023 | Canas de Senhorim | 8 | (3) |
| 2024 | Praiense | 2 | (0) |
| 2025 | Sezurense | 3 | (2) |
| 2025– | Fanum Orosei | | |

International career^{‡}
- Macau U23
| 2015–2018 | Macau | 4 | (0) |
- * Club domestic league appearances and goals as of 1 September 2026 ‡ National team caps and goals as of 30 December 2021

Alexandre Raposo de Matos (born 31 May 1995) is a Macanese international footballer who currently plays for Italian club Fanum Orosei. He also holds Portuguese citizenship.

== Club career ==
Having started his career at his father's side, Windsor Arch Ka 1, Matos spent a season with Lam Ieng before moving to Sporting Clube de Macau. In 2014, he was offered a trial with the Macanese club's parent affiliate, Sporting Clube de Portugal. He returned to Windsor Arch for the 2015 season, before heading to England to study sports psychology while also playing for lower division side Greenwood Meadows.

On 30 December 2021, he was announced as a new signing of Eccellenza Sicily amateur club Mazara. In August 2022, he returned in Portugal to join amateur club Canas de Senhorim.

== International career ==
Matos made his senior international debut for Macau in qualification for the 2018 FIFA World Cup, playing 90 minutes in a 3–0 defeat to Cambodia.

== Personal life ==
Matos is the son of Angolan-born former footballer Paulo Conde, and the two featured in the same league game for Windsor Arch Ka I in 2012; a 1–0 win over Lam Pak. However they were not on the pitch at the same time, as Conde had been substituted at half time, and Matos came on in the 87th minute.

His elder brother is footballer Gonçalo Coteriano, who last played for Atlético de Macau, while his younger sister, Zara Matos, plays for the women's team of Citizen.

== Career statistics ==
=== Club ===
As of 13 March 2021.

Appearances and goals by club, season and competition
| Club | Season | League | | | Cup (Note: Includes Taça de Macau, FA Cup and Taça de Portugal) | | Other | | Total | |
| Club | Season | Division | Apps | Goals | Apps | Goals | Apps | Goals | Apps | Goals |
|---|---|---|---|---|---|---|---|---|---|---|
| Ka I | 2012 | Campeonato da 1ª Divisão do Futebol | 3 | 1 | 0 | 0 | 0 | 0 | 3 | 1 |
| Lam Ieng | 2013 | Campeonato da 1ª Divisão do Futebol | 11 | 1 | 0 | 0 | 0 | 0 | 11 | 1 |
| Sporting (Macau) | 2014 | Campeonato da 1ª Divisão do Futebol | 12 | 2 | 0 | 0 | 0 | 0 | 12 | 2 |
| Ka I | 2015 | Campeonato da 1ª Divisão do Futebol | 17 | 5 | 0 | 0 | 0 | 0 | 17 | 5 |
| Greenwood Meadows | 2015–16 | East Midlands Counties Football League | 11 | 0 | 0 | 0 | 0 | 0 | 11 | 0 |
| Ka I | 2016 | Campeonato da 1ª Divisão do Futebol | 15 | 2 | 0 | 0 | 0 | 0 | 15 | 2 |
| C.P.K. | 2018 | Liga de Elite | 15 | 5 | 0 | 0 | 0 | 0 | 15 | 5 |
| Cacém | 2018–19 | Lisbon Division of Honour | 11 | 0 | 0 | 0 | 0 | 0 | 11 | 0 |
| Sporting (Macau) | 2019 | Liga de Elite | 7 | 4 | 0 | 0 | 0 | 0 | 7 | 4 |
| Serpa | 2019–20 | Beja First Division | 10 | 2 | 0 | 0 | 0 | 0 | 10 | 2 |
| Viana do Alentejo | 2020–21 | Évora Elite Division | 2 | 0 | 0 | 0 | 0 | 0 | 2 | 0 |
| Rebordelo | 2020–21 | Bragança Division of Honour | 7 | 3 | 1 | 0 | 1 (Note: Appearances in the AF Bragança Taça) | 0 | 9 | 5 |
| Águias do Moradal | 2021–22 | Castelo Branco 1ª Divisão | 0 | 0 | 1 | 0 | 0 | 0 | 1 | 0 |
| Arganil | 2021–22 | Coimbra Division of Honour | 11 | 11 | 0 | 0 | 1 (Note: Appearances in the AF Coimbra Taça) | 0 | 12 | 11 |
| Canas de Senhorim | 2022–23 | Viseu Division of Honour | 8 | 3 | 0 | 0 | 0 | 0 | 8 | 3 |
| Praiense | 2023–24 | Campeonato de Futebol dos Açores | 2 | 0 | 0 | 0 | 0 | 0 | 2 | 0 |
| Sezurense | 2025–26 | Viseu 1ª Divisão | 3 | 2 | 0 | 0 | 2 (Note: One appearance in the Taça Sócios de Mérito, one appearance in the Taça Viseu 1ª Divisão) | 0 | 5 | 2 |
| Career total | | | 145 | 41 | 2 | 0 | 4 | 0 | 151 | 41 |

=== International ===
As of 13 March 2021

Appearances and goals by national team and year
| National team | Year | Apps | Goals |
|---|---|---|---|
| Macau | 2015 | 2 | 0 |
| Macau | 2018 | 2 | 0 |
| Total | | 4 | 0 |
