= Ricardo Torrão =

Macanese footballer

Personal information
- Full name: Ricardo João de Almeida Torrão
- Date of birth: 18 February 1991 (age 35)
- Place of birth: Johannesburg, South Africa
- Height: 1.77 m (5 ft 10 in)
- Position: Midfielder

Youth career
- 2005–2007: Estrela da Amadora
- 2007–2008: Pêro Pinheiro
- 2008–2009: Lam Pak

Senior career*
Years	Team	Apps	(Gls)
2009	Chengdu Blades	0	(0)
2009	→ Sheffield United (HK) (loan)	2	(0)
2009–2010	Mafra	0	(0)
2010	Ka I	6	(2)
2010–2011	BSV Rehden		
2011–2015	Ka I	34	(6)
2016	Benfica (Macau)	11	(0)

International career
2012	Macau	3	(1)
- * Club domestic league appearances and goals

Ricardo João de Almeida Torrão (born 18 February 1991) is a Macanese former professional footballer who played as a midfielder. He made three appearances for the Macau national team scoring one goal.

== Career statistics ==
=== Club ===
Appearances and goals by club, season and competition
Club	Season	League			Cup		Other		Total	
Club	Season	Division	Apps	Goals	Apps	Goals	Apps	Goals	Apps	Goals
Chengdu Blades	2009	Chinese Super League	0	0	0	0	0	0	0	0
Sheffield United (HK) (loan)	2008–09	First Division	2	0	0	0	0	0	2	0
Mafra	2009–10	Segunda Divisão	0	0	0	0	0	0	0	0
Ka I	2010	Campeonato da 1ª Divisão	6	2	0	0	0	0	6	2
Ka I	2012	Campeonato da 1ª Divisão	4	1	0	0	0	0	4	1
Ka I	2013	Campeonato da 1ª Divisão	12	1	0	0	0	0	12	1
Ka I	2014	Campeonato da 1ª Divisão	8	1	0	0	0	0	8	1
Ka I	2015	Campeonato da 1ª Divisão	10	3	0	0	0	0	10	3
Ka I	Total		40	8	0	0	0	0	40	8
Benfica (Macau)	2016	Campeonato da 1ª Divisão	11	0	0	0	0	0	11	0
Career total			53	8	0	0	0	0	53	8

=== International ===
Appearances and goals by national team and year
National team	Year	Apps	Goals
Macau	2012	3	1
Total		3	1

Score and result list Macau's goal tally first, score column indicates score after Torrão goal.

International goal scored by Ricardo Torrão
No.	Date	Venue	Opponent	Score	Result	Competition
1	25 September 2012	Rizal Memorial Stadium, Manila, Philippines	Taiwan	1–0	2–2	Friendly
