= 2007 Campeonato da 1ª Divisão do Futebol =

1ª Divisão
- Season: 2007
- Champions: Lam Pak; 9th title
- Matches: 90
- Goals: 398 (4.42 per match)

Statistics of Campeonato da 1ª Divisão do Futebol in the 2007 season.

== Overview ==
Lam Pak won the championship.

== League standings ==
Pos	Team	Pld	W	D	L	GF	GA	GD	Pts
1	Lam Pak	18	15	1	2	63	10	+53	46
2	Vong Chiu	18	14	3	1	82	19	+63	45
3	Vá Luen	18	13	1	4	45	21	+24	40
4	Monte Carlo	18	11	3	4	56	24	+32	36
5	Heng Tai	18	7	2	9	29	36	−7	23
6	Polícia de Segurança Pública	18	6	4	8	25	24	+1	22
7	Macao U-19	18	7	0	11	31	35	−4	21
8	Kin Chong	18	6	1	11	39	66	−27	19
9	Kuan Tai	18	3	1	14	24	74	−50	10
10	Keong Sai	18	0	0	18	4	89	−85	0

Source: rsssf.com
