= 2009 Chinese Super League =

Chinese Super League
- Season: 2009
- Champions: Beijing Guoan
- Relegated: Chengdu Blades; Guangzhou GPC
- Champions League: Beijing Guoan; Henan Construction; Changchun Yatai; Shandong Luneng
- Matches: 240
- Goals: 536 (2.23 per match)
- Top goalscorer: Hernán Barcos; Luis Ramírez (17 goals)
- Biggest home win: Guangzhou 6–1 Shenzhen (8 Aug); Qingdao 6–1 Chongqing (8 Aug)
- Biggest away win: Chongqing 0–6 Tianjin (22 Aug)
- Highest scoring: Changchun 2–6 Beijing (10 May)
- Longest winning run: 4 games Beijing Guoan (10 May–13 Jun)
- Longest unbeaten run: 11 games (5w & 6d); Shandong Luneng (12 Apr–2 Jul)
- Longest losing run: 5 games Dalian Shide (5 Oct–31 Oct)
- Highest attendance: 60,000 (Beijing v Hangzhou)
- Lowest attendance: 4,100 (Changsha v Qingdao)
- Average attendance: 16,059

The 2009 Chinese Super League season was the sixth season since the establishment of the Chinese Super League, the sixteenth season of a professional football league and the 48th top-tier league season in China. Beijing Guoan won their first ever Chinese Super League title.

The events during the 2008 season saw Liaoning Hongyun relegated and Wuhan Optics Valley withdrawn. They were replaced by the promoted teams Jiangsu Sainty and Chongqing Lifan. Zhejiang Greentown which is located in Hangzhou, Zhejiang were renamed to Hangzhou Greentown.

Each team is allowed to register a maximum of five foreign players and field four of them in starting line-up this season, one of whom must be from an AFC country.

The league title sponsor is Italian tire manufacturer Pirelli. A three-year deal was announced on March 20, 2009. Nike have renewed sponsorship deal with Super League before season starts. CCTV, SMG and Sina became league partners and would broadcast live matches on TV and online across the country.

== Clubs ==
- P – Promoted, TH – Title Holders

Club	Chinese	City	Home stadium	Capacity	Average attendance
Beijing Guoan	北京国安	Beijing	Workers' Stadium	62,000	36,805
Changchun Yatai	长春亚泰	Changchun	Development Area Stadium	25,000	12,179
Changsha Ginde	长沙金德	Changsha	Helong Sports Center Stadium	55,000	8,498
Chengdu Blades	成都谢菲联	Chengdu	Chengdu Sports Centre	42,000	11,873
Chongqing Lifan ^{P}	重庆力帆	Chongqing	Chongqing Olympic Sports Center	58,680	11,440
Dalian Shide	大连实德	Dalian	Jinzhou Stadium	30,775	16,613
Guangzhou GPC	广州医药	Guangzhou	Yuexiushan Stadium	30,000	20,057
Hangzhou Greentown	杭州绿城	Hangzhou	Huanglong Sports Center	51,139	14,790
Henan Construction	河南建业	Zhengzhou	Hanghai Stadium	29,000	19,255
Jiangsu Sainty ^{P}	江苏舜天	Nanjing	Nanjing Olympic Sports Centre	61,443	15,976
Qingdao Jonoon	青岛中能	Qingdao	Qingdao Tiantai Stadium	20,525	8,774
Shaanxi Chan-Ba	陕西浐灞	Xi'an	Shaanxi Province Stadium	47,565	23,026
Shandong Luneng ^{TH}	山东鲁能	Jinan	Shandong Provincial Stadium	43,700	17,015
Shanghai Shenhua	上海申花	Shanghai	Hongkou Football Stadium	33,060	12,627
Shenzhen Asia Travel	深圳亚旅	Shenzhen	Shenzhen Stadium	32,500	13,460
Tianjin TEDA	天津泰达	Tianjin	TEDA Soccer Stadium	36,390	14,757
**Total**					**16,059**

=== Personnel ===
Team	Manager
Beijing Guoan	(China) Hong Yuanshuo
Changchun Yatai	(China) Li Shubin
Changsha Ginde	(China) Hao Wei
Chengdu Blades	(China) Wang Baoshan
Chongqing Lifan	(Netherlands) Arie Haan
Dalian Shide	(China) Xu Hong
Guangzhou GPC	(China) Shen Xiangfu
Hangzhou Greentown	(China) Wu Jingui
Henan Construction	(China) Tang Yaodong
Jiangsu Sainty	(China) Pei Encai
Qingdao Jonoon	(Serbia) Slobodan Santrač
Shaanxi Chan-Ba	(China) Zhu Guanghu
Shandong Luneng	(Serbia) Ljubiša Tumbaković
Shanghai Shenhua	(China) Jia Xiuquan
Shenzhen Asia Travel	(China) Xie Feng
Tianjin TEDA	(China) Zuo Shusheng

=== Managerial changes ===
Club	Outgoing	Manner	When	Incoming
Chengdu Blades	(China) Li Bing	Resigned	After Round 6	(China) Wang Baoshan
Qingdao Jonoon	(China) Guo Kanfeng	Sacked	After Round 6	(Serbia) Slobodan Santrač
Chongqing Lifan	(China) Wei Xin	Resigned	After Round 10	(Netherlands) Arie Haan
Shenzhen Asia Travel	(China) Fan Yuhong	Sacked	After Round 17	(China) Xie Feng
Shaanxi Chan-Ba	(China) Cheng Yaodong	Resigned	After Round 20	(China) Zhu Guanghu
Beijing Guoan	(South Korea) Lee Jang-soo	Sacked	After Round 23	(China) Hong Yuanshuo
Hangzhou Greentown	(China) Zhou Sui'an	Sacked	After Round 24	(China) Wu Jingui
Changsha Ginde	(China) Zhu Bo	Sacked	After Round 27	(China) Hao Wei

=== Foreign players ===
The number of foreign players is restricted to five per CSL team, including a slot for a player from AFC countries. A team can use four foreign players on the field in each game, including at least one player from the AFC country. Players from Hong Kong, Macau and Chinese Taipei are deemed to be native players in CSL.

- Players name in **bold** indicates the player is registered during the mid-season transfer window.
- Players in italics were out of the squad or left the club within the season, after the pre-season transfer window, or in the mid-season transfer window, and at least had one appearance.

Club	Player 1	Player 2	Player 3	Player 4	AFC player	Former players
Beijing Guoan	(Australia) Joel Griffiths	(Cameroon) William Modibo	(Croatia) Darko Matić	(Honduras) Emil Martínez	(Australia) Ryan Griffiths	
Changchun Yatai	(Azerbaijan) Branimir Subašić	(Colombia) **Ricardo Steer**	(Honduras) Samuel Caballero	(Nigeria) **Gabriel Melkam**	(Uzbekistan) Sadriddin Abdullaev	(Australia) Matt McKay (Honduras) Elvis Scott
Changsha Ginde	(Brazil) Jéfferson Feijão	(South Korea) Kim Eun-jung	(South Korea) Lee Sang-il	(Zambia) Billy Mwanza	(South Korea) Sim Jae-won	
Chengdu Blades	(Brazil) **Agnaldo**	(Brazil) Auricélio Neres	(Jamaica) Demar Stewart	(Switzerland) Oumar Kondé	(Australia) **Brendon Santalab**	(Jamaica) Roen Nelson (North Korea) Ryang Myong-il
Chongqing Lifan	(Brazil) **Aílton**	(Brazil) José Duarte	(Costa Rica) Johnny Woodly	(Israel) **Liron Zarko**		(Uruguay) Edgar Martínez
Dalian Shide	(Chile) Adán Vergara	(Democratic Republic of the Congo) **Alain Masudi**	(South Korea) Ahn Jung-hwan	(Zambia) James Chamanga	(South Korea) Jeon Woo-keun	
Guangzhou GPC	(Brazil) Diego Barcelos	(Brazil) Diogo Barcelos	(Honduras) Luis Ramírez	(Peru) Ismael Alvarado		
Hangzhou Greentown	(Brazil) Valdo	(Bulgaria) Yordan Varbanov	(Nigeria) **Ernest Jeremiah**			(Brazil) Andrezinho (Ghana) Moses Sakyi
Henan Construction	(Brazil) Leandro Netto	(Nigeria) Obi Moneke	(Poland) Emmanuel Olisadebe		(South Korea) Song Tae-lim	
Jiangsu Sainty	(Brazil) **Alemão**	(Brazil) Eleílson	(Brazil) **Geninho**	(Colombia) Carlos Ceballos	(Uzbekistan) Aleksandr Kletskov	(Colombia) Léiner Gómez
Qingdao Jonoon	(Burkina Faso) Abdoul-Aziz Nikiema	(Portugal) Hugo Carreira	(Serbia) **Dragan Stančić**	(Serbia) Marko Sočanac	(Iraq) **Hussein Alaa Hussein**	(Nigeria) Pascal Kondaponi (South Korea) Lee Jae-won (South Korea) Lee Tae-young
Shaanxi Chan-Ba	(Brazil) Estevão Toniato	(Brazil) Ronny	(Brazil) Vicente	(Nigeria) **Edison Joseph**	(Ivory Coast) Jonas Salley^{1}	(Guatemala) Marvin Ávila
Shandong Luneng	(Argentina) **Alfredo Cano**	(Brazil) Sandro	(Serbia) Aleksandar Živković	(Venezuela) Alejandro Cichero	(Lebanon) Roda Antar	(Serbia) Miljan Mrdaković
Shanghai Shenhua	(Belarus) Vyacheslav Hleb	(Bulgaria) Yanko Valkanov	(Estonia) **Andres Oper**	(Slovenia) Aleksandar Rodić	(Australia) Mark Milligan	(Argentina) Hernán Barcos
Shenzhen Ruby	(Argentina) **Hernán Barcos**	(Senegal) Mouchid Iyane Ly	(Serbia) **Marko Zorić**	(Togo) Massamasso Tchangai	(Uzbekistan) Aleksey Nikolaev	(Brazil) Adonis (Brazil) Renan Marques
Tianjin TEDA	(Brazil) Éber	(France) Jean-Philippe Caillet	(Italy) Damiano Tommasi	(Romania) Alin Chița	(Uzbekistan) **Zayniddin Tadjiyev**	(Australia) Mark Bridge

Hong Kong/Chinese Taipei/Macau players (doesn't count on the foreign player slot)

Club	Player 1
Chengdu Blades	(South Africa) Ricardo Torrão^{2}
Hangzhou Greentown	(Hong Kong) Ng Wai Chiu

- **^1** Jonas Salley owns Australian citizenship and was counted as an Asian player in the Chinese Super League.
- **^2** Ricardo Torrão owns Macanese citizenship and was counted as a native player in the Chinese Super League.

== H1N1 flu pandemic ==
Chongqing Lifan reported an 8-player and 3-crew infection of H1N1 flu virus on 10 September. Its matches in Round 22, 23 and 24 were postponed by Chinese FA.

== League table ==
Pos	Team	Pld	W	D	L	GF	GA	GD	Pts	Qualification or relegation
1	Beijing Guoan (C)	30	13	12	5	48	28	+20	51	AFC Champions League 2010 Group stage
2	Changchun Yatai	30	14	8	8	38	31	+7	50	AFC Champions League 2010 Group stage
3	Henan Construction	30	13	9	8	35	26	+9	48	AFC Champions League 2010 Group stage
4	Shandong Luneng	30	11	12	7	35	30	+5	45 (Note: Shandong: 9 pts, 7–4; Shanghai: 7 pts, 9–3; Tianjin: 1 pt, 1–10)	AFC Champions League 2010 Group stage
5	Shanghai Shenhua	30	12	9	9	39	29	+10	45	
6	Tianjin TEDA	30	12	9	9	36	29	+7	45	
7	Chengdu Blades (R)	30	11	6	13	32	39	−7	39 (Note: Chengdu Blades were relegated after being found guilty of match-fixing on February 23, 2010.)	Relegation to China League One
8	Dalian Shide	30	10	8	12	27	31	−4	38	
9	Guangzhou GPC (R)	30	9	10	11	38	38	0	37 (Note: Guangzhou: 10 pts, 12–10; Jiangsu: 8 pts, 6–7; Shenzhen: 8 pts, 8–10; Shaanxi: 6 pts, 9–8. Guangzhou were relegated after being found guilty of match-fixing on February 23, 2010.)	Relegation to China League One
10	Jiangsu Sainty	30	9	10	11	30	30	0	37 (Note: Guangzhou: 10 pts, 12–10; Jiangsu: 8 pts, 6–7; Shenzhen: 8 pts, 8–10; Shaanxi: 6 pts, 9–8)	
11	Shenzhen Asia Travel	30	10	10	10	36	40	−4	37 (Note: Guangzhou: 10 pts, 12–10; Jiangsu: 8 pts, 6–7; Shenzhen: 8 pts, 8–10; Shaanxi: 6 pts, 9–8. Shenzhen were docked 3 points for wearing the wrong kits for a home match against Shanghai and causing a one-hour delay of the match on 30 Aug 2009.)	
12	Shaanxi Chan-Ba	30	9	10	11	26	24	+2	37	
13	Qingdao Jonoon	30	8	12	10	36	36	0	36	
14	Changsha Ginde	30	6	15	9	23	31	−8	33	
15	Hangzhou Greentown	30	8	8	14	30	43	−13	32	
16	Chongqing Lifan	30	7	8	15	27	51	−24	29	

Source: 2009 league table on the official site of the Chinese Super League
Rules for classification: 1st points; 2nd head-to-head points; 3rd head-to-head goal difference; 4th head-to-head goals scored; 5th goal difference; 6th goals scored; 7th disciplinary points (1 point for each yellow card, 3 points for each red card). Head-to-Head: used when head-to-head record is used to rank tied teams.
(C) Champions; (R) Relegated

== Positions by round ==
Team ╲ Round	1	2	3	4	5	6	7	8	9	10	11	12	13	14	15	16	17	18	19	20	21	22	23	24	25	26	27	28	29	30
Beijing Guoan	2	2	6	3	5	8	8	5	2	1	1	1	1	1	1	1	1	2	2	3	1	1	3	3	2	3	1	1	1	1
Changchun Yatai	10	4	2	6	8	4	3	4	7	3	5	3	5	4	4	4	4	7	5	4	4	5	2	2	5	2	4	3	3	2
Henan Construction	6	7	3	2	1	1	2	3	5	7	3	5	3	3	2	3	3	3	3	1	2	3	1	1	1	1	2	2	2	3
Shandong Luneng	8	3	8	5	7	3	1	1	1	2	2	2	2	2	3	2	2	1	1	2	5	2	4	4	4	4	3	4	4	4
Shanghai Shenhua	5	11	4	4	2	5	7	7	8	5	7	4	7	5	7	8	6	9	9	7	7	8	9	7	9	6	5	6	5	5
Tianjin TEDA	1	1	1	1	3	2	5	2	3	4	8	8	4	6	9	10	9	6	7	5	3	4	5	9	6	7	6	5	6	6
Chengdu Blades	15	8	13	14	15	16	15	14	14	14	14	15	15	15	15	13	14	13	14	14	14	14	12	12	12	12	11	8	10	7
Dalian Shide	16	6	12	10	6	7	6	8	4	6	6	9	6	7	5	5	7	8	8	9	8	9	6	6	3	5	7	7	7	8
Guangzhou GPC	11	10	5	7	4	6	4	6	6	8	4	6	9	9	11	7	5	4	4	6	6	6	7	8	8	10	9	10	8	9
Jiangsu Sainty	13	16	15	12	9	10	10	9	12	9	10	10	10	10	8	9	8	5	6	8	9	7	8	5	7	8	8	9	9	10
Shenzhen Asia Travel	7	15	7	11	14	14	16	15	15	15	15	14	14	14	14	15	15	15	15	15	15	15	15	15	15	15	14	15	12	11
Shaanxi Chan-Ba	3	5	9	13	12	11	12	13	13	12	13	13	11	11	12	12	13	14	13	13	13	13	11	10	10	9	10	11	11	12
Qingdao Jonoon	12	13	14	15	13	13	11	12	10	11	12	12	13	13	13	14	12	12	12	11	10	10	10	11	11	11	12	12	13	13
Changsha Ginde	9	12	10	9	10	12	13	10	11	13	9	7	8	8	6	6	10	10	10	12	12	12	14	14	14	13	15	14	14	14
Hangzhou Greentown	4	9	11	8	11	9	9	11	9	10	11	11	12	12	10	11	11	11	11	10	11	11	13	13	13	14	13	13	15	15
Chongqing Lifan	14	14	16	16	16	15	14	16	16	16	16	16	16	16	16	16	16	16	16	16	16	16	16	16	16	16	16	16	16	16

Leader
AFC Champions League Group stage
Relegation to League One

Source: Results by round

== Results ==
Home \ Away	BJ	CC	CS	CD	CQ	DL	GZ	HZ	HN	JS	QD	SX	SD	SH	SZ	TJ
Beijing Guoan		0–2	3–0	2–2	3–1	2–1	2–0	4–0	0–0	1–1	3–1	1–0	1–1	0–0	3–1	1–0
Changchun Yatai	2–6		1–1	2–0	3–2	2–0	2–0	2–0	1–0	0–0	1–1	0–0	3–2	1–0	3–1	1–0
Changsha Ginde	0–0	0–0		0–1	2–1	1–1	0–0	1–0	0–3	2–1	1–1	0–0	1–1	1–0	0–0	2–1
Chengdu Blades	0–2	2–1	1–2		2–3	1–1	2–1	2–1	3–2	1–0	0–0	2–0	2–1	1–0	0–3	0–1
Chongqing Lifan	3–2	0–0	0–0	1–1		1–0	1–0	2–1	1–2	2–0	1–1	0–1	1–1	1–1	0–1	0–6
Dalian Shide	1–2	3–2	1–0	1–0	1–0		0–0	3–1	1–0	1–0	2–0	0–0	2–0	0–1	0–0	1–1
Guangzhou GPC	1–1	1–1	2–1	1–2	3–1	3–1		2–0	2–0	1–0	0–0	1–1	1–1	2–1	6–1	1–1
Hangzhou Greentown	2–1	1–3	1–1	2–2	1–1	2–1	3–2		0–0	4–0	2–1	1–0	0–1	2–0	1–2	0–2
Henan Construction	2–2	1–0	2–0	1–1	2–0	0–0	2–1	2–0		1–1	3–1	1–1	1–3	2–0	2–0	2–1
Jiangsu Sainty	1–0	0–1	1–1	2–0	4–0	2–1	3–1	4–1	0–0		2–0	1–0	0–2	2–2	0–3	0–1
Qingdao Jonoon	0–1	2–1	2–1	2–1	6–1	3–1	0–0	1–1	0–1	0–0		2–1	3–1	2–1	2–2	1–1
Shaanxi Chan-Ba	1–0	0–1	1–1	2–0	1–2	2–0	4–1	1–1	1–0	2–2	1–0		1–2	0–0	1–1	0–1
Shandong Luneng	2–2	3–2	1–1	0–1	0–0	0–0	1–1	1–0	1–2	0–0	1–0	1–0		1–0	1–1	4–0
Shanghai Shenhua	1–1	0–0	2–1	2–1	3–1	1–0	3–1	1–1	2–0	2–1	1–1	0–2	4–1		4–1	4–0
Shenzhen Asia Travel	2–2	4–0	2–1	1–0	1–0	0–2	1–2	0–1	3–1	0–0	1–1	2–1	0–0	1–2		1–1
Tianjin TEDA	0–0	1–0	1–1	2–1	2–0	4–1	2–1	0–0	0–0	0–2	3–2	0–1	0–1	1–1	3–0	

Source: Results on the official site of the Chinese Super League
Legend: Blue = home team win; Yellow = draw; Red = away team win.

== Top scorers ==
Updated to games played on 31 Oct 2009.

Rank	Player	Club	Goals
1	(Argentina) Hernán Barcos	Shanghai Shenhua & Shenzhen Asia Travel	17
1	(Honduras) Luis Ramírez	Guangzhou GPC	17
3	(Brazil) Valdo	Hangzhou Greentown	13
4	(China) Qu Bo	Qingdao Jonoon	12
5	(China) Han Peng	Shandong Luneng	11
6	(China) Xu Liang	Guangzhou GPC	10
6	(Costa Rica) Johnny Woodly	Chongqing Lifan	10
6	(Poland) Emmanuel Olisadebe	Henan Construction	10

=== Hattricks ===
- Xu Liang of Guangzhou GPC scored the first hat-trick of the season against Dalian Shide at Yuexiushan Stadium on 6 April 2009.
- Qu Bo of Qingdao Jonoon scored a hat-trick against Chongqing Lifan at Qingdao Tiantai Stadium on 8 August 2009.
- Hernán Barcos of Shenzhen Asia Travel scored a hat-trick against Changchun Yatai at Shenzhen Stadium on 12 September 2009.
- Emil Martínez of Beijing Guoan scored a hat-trick against Hangzhou Greentown at Workers' Stadium on 31 October 2009.

== Awards ==
- Chinese Football Association Footballer of the Year: (Honduras) Samuel Caballero (Changchun Yatai)
- Chinese Super League Golden Boot Winner: (Argentina) Hernán Barcos (Shanghai Shenhua & Shenzhen Asia Travel) & (Honduras) Luis Ramírez (Guangzhou GPC)
- Chinese Football Association Young Player of the Year: (China) Deng Zhuoxiang (Jiangsu Sainty)
- Chinese Football Association Manager of the Year: (China) Tang Yaodong (Henan Construction)
- Chinese Football Association Referee of the Year: (China) Sun Baojie

== See also ==
- 2009 in Chinese football
