= 2011 Campeonato da 1ª Divisão do Futebol =

1ª Divisão
- Season: 2011
- Champions: Ka I
- Relegated: Hoi Fan; Artilheiros
- Matches: 90
- Goals: 434 (4.82 per match)
- Top goalscorer: Kamilo Silva (38 goals)

The 2011 Campeonato da 1ª Divisão do Futebol season was the 28th edition of Campeonato da 1ª Divisão do Futebol in football in Macau and started on January 14 and ended June 26, 2011. Ka I successfully defended its 2010 title by winning the 2011 final.

== Standings ==
Pos	Team	Pld	W	D	L	GF	GA	GD	Pts
1	Ka I	18	15	0	3	88	24	+64	45
2	Monte Carlo	18	14	2	2	80	16	+64	44
3	MFA Develop	18	10	6	2	34	16	+18	36
4	Porto de Macau	18	9	5	4	45	30	+15	32
5	Lam Pak	18	9	2	7	46	30	+16	29
6	Polícia	18	7	3	8	21	33	−12	24
7	Hong Ngai	18	6	1	11	41	57	−16	19
8	Lam Ieng	18	4	2	12	29	55	−26	14
9	Hoi Fan	18	2	4	12	28	69	−41	10
10	Artilheiros	18	0	3	15	22	104	−82	3

Updated to match(es) played on 19 Jun 2011. Source: soccerway.com
Rules for classification: 1) points; 2) goal difference; 3) number of goals scored.

== Results ==
Each team plays each other team twice.

Home \ Away	ART	HOF	HNG	KAI	LIE	LPK	MFA	MOC	POL	POM
Artilheiros		2–3	2–9	0–13	3–3	0–6	1–4	0–12	1–2	2–6
Hoi Fan	3–3		2–7	1–8	2–4	1–4	3–3	1–6	3–2	3–3
Hong Ngai	6–1	2–1		2–6	3–0	1–6	2–2	0–8	1–2	1–3
Ka I	12–0	7–0	7–1		5–1	4–2	0–3	4–2	2–1	5–2
Lam Ieng	5–2	5–1	1–4	0–4		1–4	0–2	2–10	1–1	3–4
Lam Pak	6–1	2–2	2–1	1–2	5–2		0–1	0–2	3–1	1–3
MFA Develop	4–0	2–1	2–0	0–2	1–0	1–1		0–2	0–0	0–0
Monte Carlo	5–0	5–1	7–0	3–2	3–0	5–1	1–2		5–1	3–1
Polícia	2–1	1–0	2–1	0–3	1–0	1–2	1–5	0–0		0–3
Porto de Macau	3–3	3–0	3–0	5–2	0–1	1–0	2–2	1–1	2–3	

Updated to match(es) played on 19 Jun 2011. Source: soccerway.com
Legend: Blue = home team win; Yellow = draw; Red = away team win.
