= Pelé (footballer, born 1973) =

Macau footballer (born 1973)

Personal information
- Full name: José Maria da Cruz Martins
- Date of birth: 4 December 1973 (age 52)
- Place of birth: Portuguese São Tomé and Príncipe (now São Tomé and Príncipe)
- Position: Forward

Youth career
- 1991–1992: Famalicão

Senior career*
Years	Team	Apps	(Gls)
1993–1995	Rubro Negro		
1996	Lam Pak		
1997–1998	Vasco Goa		
1998–1999	Churchill Brothers		
2006	Dynasty/Vong Chiu		
2007	Vá Luen		
2008–2009	Porto Macau		
2010–2012	Casa de Portugal		

International career
1996–1997	Macau	9	(4)

Managerial career
- 2011–: Casa de Portugal
- * Club domestic league appearances and goals

José Maria da Cruz Martins (born 4 December 1973), better known as Pelé, is a football coach and former player who coaches Casa de Portugal em Macau.

== Career ==
Born in São Tomé and Príncipe prior to it becoming independent from Portugal, Pelé moved first to the metropole and then to Macau, which was Portuguese as well (now a special administrative region of China). A forward, he played for GD Rubro Negro, GD Lam Pak, Dynasty/Vong Chiu, Vá Luen, FC Porto Macau, Casa de Portugal and for the senior Macau national team. He also played in India for Goa-based clubs Vasco SC and Churchill Brothers SC.
