= 2015 Campeonato da 1ª Divisão do Futebol =

Campeonato da 1ª Divisão do Futebol
- Season: 2015
- Champions: Benfica de Macau (2nd title)
- Matches: 90
- Goals: 366 (4.07 per match)
- Best player: Diego Patriota
- Top goalscorer: William Gomes (19 goals)
- Best goalkeeper: Ladisilau Fonseca

The 2015 Liga de Elite started on 16 January 2015 and ended on 21 June 2015.

== League table ==
Pos	Team	Pld	W	D	L	GF	GA	GD	Pts	Qualification or relegation
1	Benfica de Macau (C)	18	15	2	1	76	9	+67	47	2016 AFC Cup
2	Windsor Arch Ka I	18	15	1	2	71	16	+55	46	
3	Monte Carlo	18	11	2	5	39	14	+25	35	
4	Chao Pak Kei	18	11	2	5	50	28	+22	35	
5	Sporting Clube de Macau	18	10	4	4	41	24	+17	34	
6	Lai Chi	18	5	4	9	26	42	−16	19	
7	Polícia	18	4	3	11	17	40	−23	15	
8	Chuac Lun	18	4	2	12	17	70	−53	14	
9	Casa de Portugal (R)	18	3	3	12	22	66	−44	12	Relegation to Second Division
10	MFA Development (R)	18	0	1	17	8	58	−50	1	Relegation to Second Division

Updated to match(es) played on 21 June 2015. Source: www.macaufa.com
Rules for classification: 1) points; 2) goal difference; 3) number of goals scored.
(C) Champions; (R) Relegated

== Match results ==
16 January 2015 1	Casa de Portugal	0–3	Monte Carlo	Taipa
19:10 UTC+8			Thiago Silva 68', 84'; Paulo Henrique 90+2'	Stadium: M.U.S.T. Stadium

17 January 2015 1	MFA Development	1–1	Lai Chi	Taipa
14:00 UTC+8	Cheong Ka Chon 67'		Tin Lok Chan 12'	Stadium: M.U.S.T. Stadium

17 January 2015 1	Polícia	0–0	Sporting Clube de Macau	Taipa
16:15 UTC+8				Stadium: M.U.S.T. Stadium

18 January 2015 1	Benfica de Macau	2–1	Windsor Arch Ka I	Taipa
14:00 UTC+8	William 3'; Tang Hou Fai 56'		C. Nwaorou 53'	Stadium: M.U.S.T. Stadium

18 January 2015 1	Chuac Lun	0–6	Chao Pak Kei	Taipa
16:15 UTC+8			Bruno Figueiredo 23', 47'; Leong Tak Wai 26', 32'; R. Carissimo 39'; Diego Patriota 82'	Stadium: M.U.S.T. Stadium

23 January 2015 2	Windsor Arch Ka I	6–1	Chuac Lun	Taipa
19:00 UTC+8	Roni Silva 2'; Christopher Ibe Nwaorou 7'; Alexandre Matos 35'; Milton de Oliveira Carneiro 70'; Bruno Martinho 77'; Junior Pascoal Lose Maria 85'		Chan Tsz Young 69'	Stadium: M.U.S.T. Stadium

24 January 2015 2	Chao Pak Kei	5–1	Casa de Portugal	Taipa
14:00 UTC+8	Bruno Nogueira 24'; Ho Ka Seng 32'; Diego Silva Patriota 37', 90'; Choi Weng Hou 70'		Miguel Botelho 49'	Stadium: M.U.S.T. Stadium

24 January 2015 2	Monte Carlo	2–1	MFA Development	Taipa
16:00 UTC+8				Stadium: M.U.S.T. Stadium

25 January 2015 2	Lai Chi	1–0	Polícia	Taipa
14:00 UTC+8				Stadium: M.U.S.T. Stadium

25 January 2015 2	Sporting Clube de Macau	1–1	Benfica de Macau	Taipa
16:15 UTC+8				Stadium: M.U.S.T. Stadium

30 January 2015 3	Benfica de Macau	2–0	Lai Chi	Taipa
19:00 UTC+8				Stadium: M.U.S.T. Stadium

31 January 2015 3	Chuac Lun	1–8	Sporting Clube de Macau	Taipa
14:00 UTC+8				Stadium: M.U.S.T. Stadium

31 January 2015 3	Windsor Arch Ka I	2–1	Chao Pak Kei	Taipa
16:00 UTC+8				Stadium: M.U.S.T. Stadium

1 February 2015 3	Polícia	0–1	Monte Carlo	Taipa
14:00 UTC+8				Stadium: M.U.S.T. Stadium

1 February 2015 3	MFA Development	0–1	Casa de Portugal	Taipa
16:00 UTC+8				Stadium: M.U.S.T. Stadium

6 February 2015 4	Chao Pak Kei	4-1	MFA Development	Taipa
19:00 UTC+8				Stadium: M.U.S.T. Stadium

7 February 2015 4	Casa de Portugal	2-3	Polícia	Taipa
14:00 UTC+8				Stadium: M.U.S.T. Stadium

7 February 2015 4	Monte Carlo	0-2	Benfica de Macau	Taipa
16:00 UTC+8				Stadium: M.U.S.T. Stadium

8 February 2015 4	Lai Chi	2-2	Chuac Lun	Taipa
14:00 UTC+8				Stadium: M.U.S.T. Stadium

8 February 2015 4	Sporting Clube de Macau	0-1	Windsor Arch Ka I	Taipa
16:00 UTC+8				Stadium: M.U.S.T. Stadium

13 February 2015 5	Polícia	2-0	MFA Development	Taipa
19:00 UTC+8				Stadium: M.U.S.T. Stadium

14 February 2015 5	Windsor Arch Ka I	5-0	Lai Chi	Taipa
14:00 UTC+8				Stadium: M.U.S.T. Stadium

14 February 2015 5	Sporting Clube de Macau	1-1	Chao Pak Kei	Taipa
16:00 UTC+8				Stadium: M.U.S.T. Stadium

15 February 2015 5	Benfica de Macau	8-0	Casa de Portugal	Taipa
14:00 UTC+8				Stadium: M.U.S.T. Stadium

15 February 2015 5	Chuac Lun	0-3	Monte Carlo	Taipa
16:00 UTC+8				Stadium: M.U.S.T. Stadium

27 February 2015 6	Lai Chi	3-3	Sporting Clube de Macau	Taipa
19:00 UTC+8				Stadium: M.U.S.T. Stadium

28 February 2015 6	MFA Development	0-4	Benfica de Macau	Taipa
14:00 UTC+8				Stadium: M.U.S.T. Stadium

28 February 2015 6	Casa de Portugal	3-4	Chuac Lun	Taipa
16:00 UTC+8				Stadium: M.U.S.T. Stadium

1 March 2015 6	Monte Carlo	0-0	Windsor Arch Ka I	Taipa
14:00 UTC+8				Stadium: M.U.S.T. Stadium

1 March 2015 6	Chao Pak Kei	3-3	Polícia	Taipa
16:00 UTC+8				Stadium: M.U.S.T. Stadium

20 March 2015 7	Chuac Lun	3-0	MFA Development	Taipa
20:30 UTC+8				Stadium: Estádio Campo Desportivo

21 March 2015 7	Lai Chi	3-6	Chao Pak Kei	Taipa
19:00 UTC+8				Stadium: Estádio Campo Desportivo

21 March 2015 7	Windsor Arch Ka I	11-0	Casa de Portugal	Taipa
21:00 UTC+8				Stadium: Estádio Campo Desportivo

22 March 2015 7	Sporting Clube de Macau	2-1	Monte Carlo	Taipa
19:00 UTC+8				Stadium: Estádio Campo Desportivo

22 March 2015 7	Benfica de Macau	6-1	Polícia	Taipa
21:00 UTC+8				Stadium: Estádio Campo Desportivo

3 April 2015 8	Chuac Lun	2-0	Polícia	Taipa
19:00 UTC+8				Stadium: Estádio Campo Desportivo

4 April 2015 8	Chao Pak Kei	0-4	Benfica de Macau	Taipa
19:00 UTC+8				Stadium: Estádio Campo Desportivo

4 April 2015 8	Windsor Arch Ka I	6-1	MFA Development	Taipa
21:00 UTC+8		Report		Stadium: Estádio Campo Desportivo

5 April 2015 8	Sporting Clube de Macau	4-3	Casa de Portugal	Taipa
19:00 UTC+8				Stadium: Estádio Campo Desportivo

5 April 2015 8	Lai Chi	0-6	Monte Carlo	Taipa
21:00 UTC+8				Stadium: Estádio Campo Desportivo

10 April 2015 9	Windsor Arch Ka I	4-1	Polícia	Taipa
19:00 UTC+8				Stadium: Estádio Campo Desportivo

11 April 2015 9	Monte Carlo	2-1	Chao Pak Kei	Taipa
19:00 UTC+8				Stadium: Estádio Campo Desportivo

11 April 2015 9	Chuac Lun	1-12	Benfica de Macau	Taipa
21:00 UTC+8				Stadium: Estádio Campo Desportivo

12 April 2015 9	Sporting Clube de Macau	3-1	MFA Development	Taipa
19:00 UTC+8				Stadium: Estádio Campo Desportivo

12 April 2015 9	Lai Chi	2-3	Casa de Portugal	Taipa
21:00 UTC+8				Stadium: Estádio Campo Desportivo

17 April 2015 10	Monte Carlo	1-1	Casa de Portugal	Taipa
19:00 UTC+8				Stadium: Estádio Campo Desportivo

18 April 2015 10	Lai Chi	4-0	MFA Development	Taipa
18:00 UTC+8				Stadium: Estádio Campo Desportivo

18 April 2015 10	Sporting Clube de Macau	2-0	Polícia	Taipa
20:00 UTC+8				Stadium: Estádio Campo Desportivo

19 April 2015 10	Windsor Arch Ka I	3-2	Benfica de Macau	Taipa
18:00 UTC+8				Stadium: Estádio Campo Desportivo

19 April 2015 10	Chao Pak Kei	2-0	Chuac Lun	Taipa
20:00 UTC+8				Stadium: Estádio Campo Desportivo

24 April 2015 11	Chuac Lun	0-10	Windsor Arch Ka I	Taipa
19:00 UTC+8				Stadium: Estádio Campo Desportivo

25 April 2015 11	Casa de Portugal	0-2	Chao Pak Kei	Taipa
18:00 UTC+8				Stadium: Estádio Campo Desportivo

25 April 2015 11	MFA Development	0-5	Monte Carlo	Taipa
20:00 UTC+8				Stadium: Estádio Campo Desportivo

26 April 2015 11	Polícia	1-2	Lai Chi	Taipa
18:00 UTC+8		20:00 UTC+8		Stadium: Estádio Campo Desportivo

26 April 2015 11	Benfica de Macau	1-0	Sporting Clube de Macau	Taipa
20:00 UTC+8				Stadium: Estádio Campo Desportivo

1 May 2015 12	Lai Chi	1-1	Benfica de Macau	Taipa
19:30 UTC+8				Stadium: Estádio Campo Desportivo

2 May 2015 12	Sporting Clube de Macau	3-1	Chuac Lun	Taipa
18:00 UTC+8				Stadium: Estádio Campo Desportivo

2 May 2015 12	Chao Pak Kei	2-3	Windsor Arch Ka I	Taipa
20:00 UTC+8				Stadium: Estádio Campo Desportivo

3 May 2015 12	Monte Carlo	1-0	Polícia	Taipa
18:00 UTC+8				Stadium: Estádio Campo Desportivo

3 May 2015 12	Casa de Portugal	4-2	MFA Development	Taipa
20:00 UTC+8				Stadium: Estádio Campo Desportivo

8 May 2015 13	MFA Development	0-1	Chao Pak Kei	Taipa
19:30 UTC+8				Stadium: Estádio Campo Desportivo

9 May 2015 13	Polícia	1-1	Casa de Portugal	Taipa
18:00 UTC+8				Stadium: Estádio Campo Desportivo

9 May 2015 13	Benfica de Macau	2-1	Monte Carlo	Taipa
20:00 UTC+8				Stadium: Estádio Campo Desportivo

10 May 2015 13	Chuac Lun	0-4	Lai Chi	Taipa
18:00 UTC+8				Stadium: Estádio Campo Desportivo

10 May 2015 13	Windsor Arch Ka I	1-3	Sporting Clube de Macau	Taipa
20:00 UTC+8				Stadium: Estádio Campo Desportivo

15 May 2015 14	Casa de Portugal	0-8	Benfica de Macau	Taipa
19:30 UTC+8				Stadium: Estádio Campo Desportivo

16 May 2015 14	MFA Development	1-3	Polícia	Taipa
18:00 UTC+8				Stadium: Estádio Campo Desportivo

16 May 2015 14	Chao Pak Kei	4-2	Sporting Clube de Macau	Taipa
20:00 UTC+8				Stadium: Estádio Campo Desportivo

17 May 2015 14	Monte Carlo	3-0	Chuac Lun	Taipa
18:00 UTC+8				Stadium: Estádio Campo Desportivo

17 May 2015 14	Lai Chi	0-2	Windsor Arch Ka I	Taipa
20:10 UTC+8				Stadium: Estádio Campo Desportivo

29 May 2015 15	Benfica de Macau	4-0	MFA Development	Taipa
19:30 UTC+8				Stadium: Estádio Campo Desportivo

30 May 2015 15	Sporting Clube de Macau	2-0	Lai Chi	Taipa
18:00 UTC+8				Stadium: Estádio Campo Desportivo

30 May 2015 15	Chuac Lun	0-0	Casa de Portugal	Taipa
20:00 UTC+8				Stadium: Estádio Campo Desportivo

31 May 2015 15	Windsor Arch Ka I	1-0	Monte Carlo	Taipa
18:00 UTC+8				Stadium: Estádio Campo Desportivo

31 May 2015 15	Polícia	0-6	Chao Pak Kei	Taipa
20:00 UTC+8				Stadium: Estádio Campo Desportivo

5 June 2015 16	Monte Carlo	5-1	Sporting Clube de Macau	Taipa
19:00 UTC+8				Stadium: Estádio Campo Desportivo

5 June 2015 16	Polícia	0-5	Benfica de Macau	Taipa
21:00 UTC+8				Stadium: Estádio Campo Desportivo

6 June 2015 16	Casa de Portugal	2-5	Windsor Arch Ka I	Taipa
15:30 UTC+8				Stadium: Estádio Campo Desportivo

7 June 2015 16	MFA Development	0-2	Chuac Lun	Taipa
18:00 UTC+8				Stadium: Estádio Campo Desportivo

7 June 2015 16	Chao Pak Kei	3-0	Lai Chi	Taipa
20:00 UTC+8				Stadium: Estádio Campo Desportivo

12 June 2015 17	Polícia	1-0	Chuac Lun	Taipa
19:30 UTC+8				Stadium: Estádio Campo Desportivo

13 June 2015 17	Benfica de Macau	5-0	Chao Pak Kei	Taipa
18:00 UTC+8				Stadium: Estádio Campo Desportivo

13 June 2015 17	MFA Development	0-7	Windsor Arch Ka I	Taipa
20:00 UTC+8				Stadium: Estádio Campo Desportivo

14 June 2015 17	Casa de Portugal	0-4	Sporting Clube de Macau	Taipa
18:00 UTC+8				Stadium: Estádio Campo Desportivo

14 June 2015 17	Monte Carlo	4-0	Lai Chi	Taipa
20:00 UTC+8				Stadium: Estádio Campo Desportivo

19 June 2015 18	Polícia	1-3	Windsor Arch Ka I	Taipa
19:30 UTC+8				Stadium: Estádio Campo Desportivo

20 June 2015 18	Chao Pak Kei	3-1	Monte Carlo	Taipa
18:00 UTC+8				Stadium: Estádio Campo Desportivo

20 June 2015 18	MFA Development	0-2	Sporting Clube de Macau	Taipa
20:00 UTC+8				Stadium: Estádio Campo Desportivo

21 June 2015 18	Benfica de Macau	7-0	Chuac Lun	Taipa
18:00 UTC+8				Stadium: Estádio Campo Desportivo

21 June 2015 18	Casa de Portugal	1-3	Lai Chi	Taipa
20:00 UTC+8				Stadium: Estádio Campo Desportivo
