= Paulo Conde =

Association football player

Personal information
- Full name: Paulo Alexandre Conde de Matos
- Date of birth: 1 February 1969 (age 57)
- Place of birth: Luanda, Portuguese Angola (now Angola)
- Position: Midfielder

Senior career*
Years	Team	Apps	(Gls)
1988–1989	Santacombadense		
1989–1990	Trafaria		
1991	Leng Ngan		
1994–1995	Rubro Negro		
1997	Lam Pak		
2008	Vá Luen		
2009	Hoi Fan		
2010	Porto de Macau	3	(0)
2011	Benfica de Macau		
2012	Ka I		
2013	Artilheiros		
2014	Casa de Portugal		

International career^{‡}
1996	Macau	2	(1)
- * Club domestic league appearances and goals ‡ National team caps and goals as of 4 February 1996

Paulo Alexandre Conde de Matos (born 1 December 1969), known as Paulo Conde, is a retired footballer. Born in Angola prior to its becoming independent from Portugal, he moved first to the metropole and then to Macau, which was Portuguese as well (now a special administrative region of China). Being there, he has played for the senior Macau national team.

== Personal life ==
Conde is the father of Macanese footballer Alexandre Matos and the two featured in the same league game for Windsor Arch Ka I in 2012; a 1–0 win over Lam Pak. However they were not on the pitch at the same time, as Conde had been substituted at half time, and Matos came on in the 87th minute.
