= 2016 Campeonato da 1ª Divisão do Futebol =

Campeonato da 1ª Divisão do Futebol
- Season: 2016
- Champions: Benfica de Macau (3rd title)
- Matches: 90
- Goals: 396 (4.4 per match)
- Top goalscorer: Carlos Leonel (24 goals)

The 2016 Liga de Elite began on 15 January 2016 and ended on 12 June 2016.

== Renamed Clubs ==
- Windsor Arch Ka I were renamed Tak Chun Ka I

== League table ==
Pos	Team	Pld	W	D	L	GF	GA	GD	Pts	Qualification or relegation
1	Benfica de Macau (C)	18	17	1	0	78	4	+74	52	2017 AFC Cup
2	Tak Chun Ka I	18	13	2	3	46	12	+34	41	
3	Sporting de Macau	18	11	4	3	50	15	+35	37	
4	Monte Carlo	18	11	2	5	79	19	+60	35	
5	Chao Pak Kei	18	10	3	5	42	17	+25	33	
6	Lai Chi	18	5	4	9	39	46	−7	19	
7	Polícia	18	3	3	12	17	57	−40	12	
8	Kei Lun	18	3	3	12	16	59	−43	12	
9	Casa de Portugal	18	2	4	12	19	92	−73	10	Relegation to Second Division
10	Chuac Lun	18	0	4	14	10	75	−65	4	Relegation to Second Division

Updated to match(es) played on 13 June 2016. Source: www.macaufa.com
Rules for classification: 1) points; 2) goal difference; 3) number of goals scored.
(C) Champions

== Match results ==
15 January 2016 1	Polícia	0–5	Benfica de Macau	Taipa
12:00			Carlos Leonel 12', 29', 34', 37'; Lei Kam Hong 90+2'	Stadium: M.U.S.T. Stadium; Referee: Nivon Robesh Gamini

16 January 2016 1	Chuac Lun	3–3	Casa de Portugal	Taipa
07:00	Abrantes 16', 48'; Jun Hosaka 88' (pen.)		Gene Yu Mak 54'; Milton José Carneiro 59'; Vilar 90+1'	Stadium: M.U.S.T. Stadium

16 January 2016 1	Kei Lun	0–5	Tak Chun Ka I	Taipa
09:00			Fabrício 20'; William 32', 46', 61'; Bruno Pacheco Leite 37'	Stadium: M.U.S.T. Stadium

17 January 2016 1	Monte Carlo	2–3	Chao Pak Kei	Taipa
07:00	Amarildo Ristof 43'; Jullyan 56'		Roni Silva 42', 64'; Ronald Cabrera 90+2'	Stadium: M.U.S.T. Stadium

17 January 2016 1	Lai Chi	1–4	Sporting de Macau	Taipa
09:15	Tam Kai Hong 71'		Pio Júnior 13'; Lei Ka Man 45+2'; Juninho 72', 75'	Stadium: M.U.S.T. Stadium

22 January 2016 2	Casa de Portugal	2–6	Lai Chi	Taipa
12:00	Duarte Torres 3'; Miguel Angelo Couto 71'		Kin Long Ao Ieong 9'; Ka Un Sio 11', 13', 88'; Lei Ka Kei 42'; Tam Kai Hong 48'	Stadium: M.U.S.T. Stadium

23 January 2016 2	Sporting de Macau	2–0	Polícia	Taipa
07:00	Wilson Lay 40'; Juninho 52'			Stadium: M.U.S.T. Stadium

23 January 2016 2	Benfica de Macau	1–0	Monte Carlo	Taipa
09:00	Alison Brito 80'			Stadium: M.U.S.T. Stadium

24 January 2016 2	Chao Pak Kei	5–0	Kei Lun	Taipa
07:00	Diego Patriota 1', 65'; Cheong Kin Chong 57'; Roni Silva 71'; Ronald Cabrera 86'			Stadium: M.U.S.T. Stadium

24 January 2016 2	Tak Chun Ka I	1–1	Chuac Lun	Taipa
09:00	Falcao De Oliveira 72'		Ieong Ka Hong 67'	Stadium: M.U.S.T. Stadium

29 January 2016 3	Chuac Lun	0–6	Chao Pak Kei	Taipa
13:00			Eduardo Tong 18'; Diego Patriota 35'; Roni Silva 66', 68', 75'; Chong Cheong Kim 87'	Stadium: M.U.S.T. Stadium

30 January 2016 3	Lai Chi	0–2	Tak Chun Ka I	Taipa
14:00 UTC+8				Stadium: M.U.S.T. Stadium

30 January 2016 3	Casa de Portugal	0–8	Sporting de Macau	Taipa
16:00 UTC+8				Stadium: M.U.S.T. Stadium

31 January 2016 3	Kei Lun	0–7	Benfica de Macau	Taipa
14:00 UTC+8				Stadium: M.U.S.T. Stadium

31 January 2016 3	Monte Carlo	8–0	Polícia	Taipa
16:00 UTC+8				Stadium: M.U.S.T. Stadium

3 February 2016 4	Sporting de Macau	0–0	Monte Carlo	Taipa
19:00 UTC+8				Stadium: M.U.S.T. Stadium

3 February 2016 4	Polícia	3–1	Kei Lun	Taipa
21:00 UTC+8				Stadium: M.U.S.T. Stadium

4 February 2016 4	Benfica de Macau	7–0	Chuac Lun	Taipa
19:00 UTC+8				Stadium: M.U.S.T. Stadium

4 February 2016 4	Chao Pak Kei	1–1	Lai Chi	Taipa
21:00 UTC+8				Stadium: M.U.S.T. Stadium

5 February 2016 4	Tak Chun Ka I	3–0	Casa de Portugal	Taipa
19:00 UTC+8				Stadium: M.U.S.T. Stadium

19 February 2016 5	Kei Lun	0–5	Monte Carlo	Taipa
19:00 UTC+8				Stadium: M.U.S.T. Stadium

20 February 2016 5	Casa de Portugal	0–7	Chao Pak Kei	Taipa
14:00 UTC+8				Stadium: M.U.S.T. Stadium

20 February 2016 5	Tak Chun Ka I	1–1	Sporting de Macau	Taipa
16:00 UTC+8				Stadium: M.U.S.T. Stadium

21 February 2016 5	Chuac Lun	0–0	Polícia	Taipa
14:00 UTC+8				Stadium: M.U.S.T. Stadium

21 February 2016 5	Lai Chi	0–5	Benfica de Macau	Taipa
16:00 UTC+8				Stadium: M.U.S.T. Stadium

27 February 2016 6	Monte Carlo	4–0	Chuac Lun	Taipa
14:00 UTC+8				Stadium: M.U.S.T. Stadium

27 February 2016 6	Polícia	2–4	Lai Chi	Taipa
16:00 UTC+8				Stadium: M.U.S.T. Stadium

28 February 2016 6	Benfica de Macau	14–0	Casa de Portugal	Taipa
14:00 UTC+8				Stadium: M.U.S.T. Stadium

28 February 2016 6	Sporting de Macau	7–0	Kei Lun	Taipa
16:00 UTC+8				Stadium: M.U.S.T. Stadium

2 March 2016 6	Chao Pak Kei	1–0	Tak Chun Ka I	Taipa
19:00 UTC+8				Stadium: M.U.S.T. Stadium

4 March 2016 7	Chuac Lun	0–1	Kei Lun	Taipa
19:00 UTC+8				Stadium: M.U.S.T. Stadium

5 March 2016 7	Lai Chi	0–5	Monte Carlo	Taipa
14:00 UTC+8				Stadium: M.U.S.T. Stadium

5 March 2016 7	Casa de Portugal	3–1	Polícia	Taipa
16:00 UTC+8				Stadium: M.U.S.T. Stadium

6 March 2016 7	Tak Chun Ka I	0–3	Benfica de Macau	Taipa
14:00 UTC+8				Stadium: M.U.S.T. Stadium

6 March 2016 7	Chao Pak Kei	0–1	Sporting de Macau	Taipa
16:00 UTC+8				Stadium: M.U.S.T. Stadium

11 March 2016 8	Lai Chi	1–1	Kei Lun	Taipa
19:00 UTC+8				Stadium: Estádio Campo Desportivo

12 March 2016 8	Sporting de Macau	6–0	Chuac Lun	Taipa
14:00 UTC+8				Stadium: Estádio Campo Desportivo

12 March 2016 8	Casa de Portugal	0–16	Monte Carlo	Taipa
16:00 UTC+8				Stadium: Estádio Campo Desportivo

13 March 2016 8	Tak Chun Ka I	4–0	Polícia	Taipa
14:00 UTC+8				Stadium: Estádio Campo Desportivo

13 March 2016 8	Chao Pak Kei	0–2	Benfica de Macau	Taipa
16:00 UTC+8				Stadium: Estádio Campo Desportivo

18 March 2016 9	Casa de Portugal	1–2	Kei Lun	Taipa
19:00 UTC+8				Stadium: Estádio Campo Desportivo

19 March 2016 9	Benfica de Macau	2–1	Sporting de Macau	Taipa
14:00 UTC+8				Stadium: Estádio Campo Desportivo

19 March 2016 9	Lai Chi	4–0	Chuac Lun	Taipa
16:00 UTC+8				Stadium: Estádio Campo Desportivo

20 March 2016 9	Tak Chun Ka I	2–1	Monte Carlo	Taipa
14:00 UTC+8				Stadium: Estádio Campo Desportivo

20 March 2016 9	Chao Pak Kei	3–1	Polícia	Taipa
16:00 UTC+8				Stadium: Estádio Campo Desportivo

25 March 2016 10	Chao Pak Kei	0–5	Monte Carlo	Taipa
19:00 UTC+8				Stadium: Estádio Campo Desportivo

26 March 2016 10	Benfica de Macau	1–0	Polícia	Taipa
14:00 UTC+8				Stadium: Estádio Campo Desportivo

26 March 2016 10	Sporting de Macau	4–2	Lai Chi	Taipa
16:00 UTC+8				Stadium: Estádio Campo Desportivo

27 March 2016 10	Tak Chun Ka I	4–1	Kei Lun	Taipa
14:00 UTC+8				Stadium: Estádio Campo Desportivo

27 March 2016 10	Casa de Portugal	2–2	Chuac Lun	Taipa
16:00 UTC+8				Stadium: Estádio Campo Desportivo

8 April 2016 11	Polícia	1–6	Sporting de Macau	Taipa
19:00 UTC+8				Stadium: Estádio Campo Desportivo

9 April 2016 11	Kei Lun	0–1	Chao Pak Kei	Taipa
14:00 UTC+8				Stadium: Estádio Campo Desportivo

9 April 2016 11	Monte Carlo	0–4	Benfica de Macau	Taipa
16:00 UTC+8				Stadium: Estádio Campo Desportivo

10 April 2016 11	Lai Chi	2–3	Casa de Portugal	Taipa
19:00 UTC+8				Stadium: Estádio Campo Desportivo

10 April 2016 11	Chuac Lun	1–4	Tak Chun Ka I	Taipa
21:00 UTC+8				Stadium: Estádio Campo Desportivo

15 April 2016 12	Chao Pak Kei	8–0	Chuac Lun	Taipa
19:00 UTC+8				Stadium: Estádio Campo Desportivo

16 April 2016 12	Tak Chun Ka I	2–0	Lai Chi	Taipa
14:00 UTC+8				Stadium: Estádio Campo Desportivo

16 April 2016 12	Sporting de Macau	1–0	Casa de Portugal	Taipa
16:00 UTC+8				Stadium: Estádio Campo Desportivo

17 April 2016 12	Benfica de Macau	2–0	Kei Lun	Taipa
14:00 UTC+8				Stadium: Estádio Campo Desportivo

17 April 2016 12	Polícia	0–5	Monte Carlo	Taipa
16:00 UTC+8				Stadium: Estádio Campo Desportivo

22 April 2016 13	Monte Carlo	1–1	Sporting de Macau	Taipa
19:00 UTC+8				Stadium: Estádio Campo Desportivo

23 April 2016 13	Kei Lun	0–3	Polícia	Taipa
14:00 UTC+8				Stadium: Estádio Campo Desportivo

23 April 2016 13	Chuac Lun	0–9	Benfica de Macau	Taipa
16:00 UTC+8				Stadium: Estádio Campo Desportivo

24 April 2016 13	Lai Chi	1–1	Chao Pak Kei	Taipa
14:00 UTC+8				Stadium: Estádio Campo Desportivo

24 April 2016 13	Casa de Portugal	0–4	Tak Chun Ka I	Taipa
16:00 UTC+8				Stadium: Estádio Campo Desportivo

29 April 2016 14	Polícia	3–0	Chuac Lun	Taipa
19:00 UTC+8				Stadium: Estádio Campo Desportivo

30 April 2016 14	Monte Carlo	5–0	Kei Lun	Taipa
14:00 UTC+8				Stadium: Estádio Campo Desportivo

30 April 2016 14	Sporting de Macau	0–1	Tak Chun Ka I	Taipa
16:00 UTC+8				Stadium: Estádio Campo Desportivo

1 May 2016 14	Benfica de Macau	4–0	Lai Chi	Taipa
14:00 UTC+8				Stadium: Estádio Campo Desportivo

1 May 2016 14	Chao Pak Kei	4–1	Casa de Portugal	Taipa
16:00 UTC+8				Stadium: Estádio Campo Desportivo

6 May 2016 15	Lai Chi	4–0	Polícia	Taipa
19:00 UTC+8				Stadium: Estádio Campo Desportivo

7 May 2016 15	Tak Chun Ka I	1–0	Chao Pak Kei	Taipa
18:00 UTC+8				Stadium: Estádio Campo Desportivo

7 May 2016 15	Chuac Lun	1–7	Monte Carlo	Taipa
20:00 UTC+8				Stadium: Estádio Campo Desportivo

8 May 2016 15	Casa de Portugal	0–6	Benfica de Macau	Taipa
18:00 UTC+8				Stadium: Estádio Campo Desportivo

8 May 2016 15	Kei Lun	1–3	Sporting de Macau	Taipa
20:00 UTC+8				Stadium: Estádio Campo Desportivo

19 May 2016 16	Kei Lun	3–1	Chuac Lun	Taipa
19:00 UTC+8				Stadium: Estádio Campo Desportivo

19 May 2016 16	Monte Carlo	4–3	Lai Chi	Taipa
21:00 UTC+8				Stadium: Estádio Campo Desportivo

20 May 2016 16	Sporting de Macau	0–2	Chao Pak Kei	Taipa
19:00 UTC+8				Stadium: Estádio Campo Desportivo

20 May 2016 16	Benfica de Macau	1–0	Tak Chun Ka I	Taipa
21:00 UTC+8				Stadium: Estádio Campo Desportivo

1 June 2016 16	Polícia	2–2	Casa de Portugal	Taipa
19:00 UTC+8				Stadium: M.U.S.T. Stadium

27 May 2016 17	Chuac Lun	0–2	Sporting de Macau	Taipa
19:30 UTC+8				Stadium: Estádio Campo Desportivo

28 May 2016 17	Kei Lun	5–5	Lai Chi	Taipa
18:00 UTC+8				Stadium: Estádio Campo Desportivo

28 May 2016 17	Monte Carlo	10–1	Casa de Portugal	Taipa
20:00 UTC+8				Stadium: Estádio Campo Desportivo

29 May 2016 17	Polícia	1–9	Tak Chun Ka I	Taipa
18:00 UTC+8				Stadium: Estádio Campo Desportivo

29 May 2016 17	Benfica de Macau	2–0	Chao Pak Kei	Taipa
20:00 UTC+8				Stadium: Estádio Campo Desportivo

10 June 2016 18	Chuac Lun	1–5	Lai Chi	Taipa
19:30 UTC+8				Stadium: Estádio Campo Desportivo

11 June 2016 18	Polícia	0–0	Chao Pak Kei	Taipa
18:00 UTC+8				Stadium: Estádio Campo Desportivo

11 June 2016 18	Kei Lun	1–1	Casa de Portugal	Taipa
20:00 UTC+8				Stadium: Estádio Campo Desportivo

12 June 2016 18	Monte Carlo	1–3	Tak Chun Ka I	Taipa
18:00 UTC+8				Stadium: Estádio Campo Desportivo

12 June 2016 18	Sporting de Macau	3–3	Benfica de Macau	Taipa
20:00 UTC+8				Stadium: Estádio Campo Desportivo
