= Zara Matos =

Macau footballer (born 2006)

Personal information
- Full name: Zara Maria Raposo de Matos
- Date of birth: 22 January 2006 (age 20)
- Place of birth: England
- Height: 1.60 m (5 ft 3 in)
- Position: Forward

Youth career
- 2018–2024: Sporting Clube de Macau

Senior career*
Years	Team	Apps	(Gls)
2024–2025	Hong Kong Rangers FC	11	(14)
2026–	Citizen		
- * Club domestic league appearances and goals

Zara Matos (born 22 January 2006) is a Macau footballer who plays as a forward for Citizen.

== Early life ==
Matos was born on 23 January 2006 in England. The daughter of Macau international Paulo Conde, her siblings include former footballer Gonçalo Coteriano and Macau international Alexandre Matos. Growing up, she competed in capoeira.

== Career ==
Matos started her career with Macau side Sporting Clube de Macau at the age of thirteen. Following her stint there, she signed for Hong Kong side Hong Kong Rangers FC during May 2024. Matos became a coach at the Paris Saint-Germain Academy in Hong Kong in 2025. She joined Citizen in 2026.

== Style of play ==
Matos plays as a forward. Right-footed, she is known for her speed.
