= 2012 Campeonato da 1ª Divisão do Futebol =

1ª Divisão
- Season: 2012
- Champions: Ka I
- Relegated: Hong Ngai
- Matches: 90
- Goals: 327 (3.63 per match)
- Top goalscorer: Alison Brito (17 goals)

The 2012 Campeonato da 1ª Divisão do Futebol was the 29th edition of football in Macau and started on January 6 and ended June 10, 2012. Ka I successfully defended its 2011 title defeating its opponents in the 2012 final.

== Standings ==
| Pos | Team | Pld | W | D | L | GF | GA | GD | Pts |
|---|---|---|---|---|---|---|---|---|---|
| 1 | Ka I | 18 | 14 | 3 | 1 | 59 | 12 | +47 | 45 |
| 2 | Monte Carlo | 18 | 13 | 4 | 1 | 45 | 18 | +27 | 43 |
| 3 | Benfica de Macau | 18 | 11 | 2 | 5 | 35 | 15 | +20 | 35 |
| 4 | Lam Pak | 18 | 8 | 4 | 6 | 41 | 32 | +9 | 28 |
| 5 | Porto de Macau | 18 | 8 | 3 | 7 | 35 | 24 | +11 | 27 |
| 6 | Kuan Tai | 18 | 8 | 2 | 8 | 32 | 32 | 0 | 26 |
| 7 | Polícia | 18 | 6 | 2 | 10 | 20 | 29 | −9 | 20 |
| 8 | Lam Ieng | 18 | 5 | 3 | 10 | 30 | 39 | −9 | 18 |
| 9 | MFA Develop | 18 | 4 | 3 | 11 | 25 | 40 | −15 | 15 |
| 10 | Hong Ngai | 18 | 0 | 0 | 18 | 5 | 86 | −81 | 0 |

Updated to match(es) played on 10 Jun 2012. Source: soccerway.com and Macau Football Association Match Report and Final Classification Table
Rules for classification: 1) points; 2) goal difference; 3) number of goals scored.

== Results ==
Each team plays each other team twice.
