= Lai Chi =

Lai Chi may refer to:

- Lai Chi, the western portion of Quarry Bay on Hong Kong Island
- Lai Chi (football), a Macanese football team
- Lai Ji (610–662), Lai Chi in Wade–Giles, Tang dynasty minister
