= 2020 Liga de Elite =

Liga de Elite
- Season: 2020
- Champions: Benfica de Macau
- AFC Cup: Benfica de Macau; Chao Pak Kei
- Matches: 45
- Goals: 242 (5.38 per match)
- Top goalscorer: Carlos Leonel (23 goals)

The 2020 Liga de Elite is the 48 season of the Liga de Elite, the top Macanese league for association football clubs since its establishment in 1973. The season began on 18 September 2020.

== Effects of the 2020 coronavirus pandemic ==
As a consequence of the COVID-19 pandemic in Macau, the season's start was delayed until September.

On 3 September 2020, the Macau Football Association announced that the 2020 season would begin on 18 September 2020. Teams will play a single round robin format and players are required to undergo nucleic acid testing prior to every match. If the season is delayed at any point due to an outbreak, the clubs have agreed to cancel the season so that the 2021 season can begin on time.

There will be no promotion or relegation for the season.

== Team location ==
Location football club of Liga de Elite

== League table ==
Pos	Team	Pld	W	D	L	GF	GA	GD	Pts
1	Benfica de Macau (C)	9	8	1	0	72	6	+66	25
2	Chao Pak Kei	9	8	1	0	50	2	+48	25
3	Cheng Fung	9	6	0	3	21	15	+6	18
4	Sporting de Macau	9	4	1	4	23	18	+5	13
5	Ka I	9	3	3	3	11	16	−5	12
6	Hang Sai	9	4	0	5	15	31	−16	12
7	Polícia	9	3	0	6	10	19	−9	9
8	Casa de Portugal	9	2	2	5	18	64	−46	8
9	Monte Carlo	9	1	2	6	12	29	−17	5
10	Lun Lok	9	1	0	8	10	42	−32	3

Source: Macau FA
Rules for classification: 1) points; 2) goal difference; 3) number of goals scored.
(C) Champions

== Results ==
Home \ Away	BEN	CAS	CHF	CPK	HNS	KAI	LUN	MCL	POL	SPO
Benfica de Macau		23–1				4–0	10–0	6–0		6–1
Casa de Portugal					3–2			4–4		1–8
Cheng Fung	1–7	4–1		0–4		2–1	5–0		1–0	
Chao Pak Kei	2–2	15–0			7–0	5–0		3–0		
Hang Sai	1–10		0–4			1–2			2–1	3–1
Ka I		1–1					3–1		2–0	
Lun Lok		3–4		0–7	2–3					1–6
Monte Carlo			1–4		1–3	1–1	1–2		3–1	
Polícia	0–4	4–3		0–3			3–1			1–0
Sporting de Macau			1–0	0–4		1–1		5–1		

Source: Flashscore
Legend: Blue = home team win; Yellow = draw; Red = away team win.
