= 2000 Campeonato da 1ª Divisão do Futebol =

1ª Divisão
- Season: 2000
- Champions: Polícia de Segurança Pública
- Matches: 42
- Goals: 172 (4.1 per match)

Statistics of Campeonato da 1ª Divisão do Futebol in the 2000 season.

== Overview ==
Polícia de Segurança Pública won the championship.

== League standings ==
Pos	Team	Pld	W	D	L	GF	GA	GD	Pts
1	Polícia de Segurança Pública	12	9	2	1	35	9	+26	29
2	Lam Pak	12	?	?	?	33	11	+22	28
3	Heng Tai	12	?	?	?	21	10	+11	19
4	Monte Carlo	12	?	?	?	25	25	0	17
5	P M Fiscal	12	?	?	?	25	33	−8	11
6	Bombeiros	12	?	?	?	12	30	−18	8
7	Ip U	12	?	?	?	11	44	−33	4

Source: rsssf.com
