= Lei Chi Kin =

Macau footballer (born 1990)

Personal information
- Date of birth: 24 October 1990 (age 36)
- Place of birth: Macau
- Position: Defender

Team information
- Current team: Lun Lok

Senior career*
Years	Team	Apps	(Gls)
–2013	Kuan Tai	35+	(0+)
2014–2019	Benfica de Macau	81	(3)
2020	CPK	8	(0)
2021–	Lun Lok	28+	(0+)

International career
2015–	Macau	15	(0)
- * Club domestic league appearances and goals

Lei Chi Kin (Chinese: 李子健; born 24 October 1990) is a Macau footballer who plays as a defender for Lun Lok.

== Early life ==
Lei started playing football at a young age and competed in triathlon and competitive cycling. As a youth player, Lei joined the youth academy of Macau Football School.

== Career ==
Before the 2014 season, he signed for Macau side Benfica de Macau, where he was regarded as one of the club's most important defenders. Besides playing football, he has worked as a fencing coach. He has also worked for Macau television, and was runner-up in the Macau International Marathon.

== Style of play ==
Lei mainly played as a defender and is known for his speed and work ethic.

== Personal life ==
Lei regards Wales international Gareth Bale as his football idol.
