= Toniato =

Toniato is an Italian surname. Notable people with the surname include:

- Andrea Toniato (born 1991), Italian swimmer
- Estevão Toniato (born 1979), Brazilian footballer
