= 1973 Campeonato da 1ª Divisão do Futebol =

Campeonato da 1ª Divisão do Futebol
- Season: 1973
- Champions: Polícia de Segurança Pública

Statistics of Campeonato da 1ª Divisão do Futebol in the 1973 season.

== Overview ==
Polícia de Segurança Pública won the championship.
