= 2010 Campeonato da 1ª Divisão do Futebol =

1ª Divisão
- Season: 2010
- Champions: Ka I
- Relegated: Kuan Tai; Vá Luen
- Matches: 45
- Goals: 179 (3.98 per match)
- Top goalscorer: (Macau) Lee Keng Pan (10 goals)

The 2010 Campeonato da 1ª Divisão do Futebol season was the 27th season of football in Macao and started on April 17, 2010, and ended on July 4, 2010, with Ka I becoming champions and Kuan Tai and Vá Luen being relegated. Teams played each other only once.

== Standings ==
Pos	Team	Pld	W	D	L	GF	GA	GD	Pts
1	Ka I	9	7	2	0	26	9	+17	23
2	Porto de Macau	9	6	2	1	23	13	+10	20
3	Lam Pak	9	6	1	2	21	12	+9	19
4	Monte Carlo	9	4	4	1	18	15	+3	16
5	Polícia	9	4	1	4	17	7	+10	13
6	MFA Develop	9	3	1	5	21	17	+4	10
7	Artilheiros	9	3	1	5	12	17	−5	10
8	Hoi Fan	9	2	2	5	23	30	−7	8
9	Kuan Tai	9	0	5	4	12	26	−14	5
10	Vá Luen	9	0	1	8	6	33	−27	1

== Results ==
Each team plays each other team once.

Home \ Away	ART	HOF	KAI	KUT	LPK	MFA	MOC	POL	POM	VAL
Artilheiros					1–2		2–2	0–2		2–1
Hoi Fan	6–4		1–4	3–3	3–4	2–3			2–7	
Ka I	2–0			1–1				1–0		
Kuan Tai	0–2				2–4		1–2	0–9	0–0	4–4
Lam Pak			1–2				1–1	1–0	2–3	
MFA Develop	0–1		3–5	1–1	0–1		6–1	0–1		
Monte Carlo		4–1	3–3						1–1	2–0
Polícia		1–1					0–2		0–2	
Porto de Macau	2–0		0–5			4–3				
Vá Luen		0–4	0–3		0–5	1–5		0–4	0–4	

Source: soccerway.com
Legend: Blue = home team win; Yellow = draw; Red = away team win.
