= Alison Brito =

Cape Verdean footballer (born 1984)

Personal information
- Full name: Alison Brito Agues
- Date of birth: 27 October 1984 (age 42)
- Place of birth: Praia, Cape Verde
- Height: 1.85 m (6 ft 1 in)
- Position: Forward

Senior career*
Years	Team	Apps	(Gls)
2008	CD Monte Carlo		
2009–2012	Casa do FC Porto		(17)
2013–2016	Windsor Arch Ka I		
2016–2022	Benfica de Macau		
2022–2024	Cheng Fung		
2024–	Benfica de Macau		
- * Club domestic league appearances and goals

Alison Brito Agues (born 27 October 1984) is a Cape Verdean footballer who plays as a forward.

He first appeared in the Macanese club CD Monte Carlo and was one of the first Cape Verdeans to play football with a Macanese club. A year later, he played with Casa do FC Porto for the next three years and in 2013 with Windsor Arch Ka I as of 2014.

== Honors ==
=== Individual records ===
Record type	Year	Goals
Greatest scorer	2012	17
