= Leong Chon Kit =

Macau footballer

Personal information
- Date of birth: 6 June 1980 (age 46)
- Place of birth: Macau
- Height: 1.72 m (5 ft 8 in)
- Position: Goalkeeper

Senior career*
Years	Team	Apps	(Gls)
2002–2022	PSP Macau	120+	(1)

International career
2007–2013	Macau	17	(0)
- * Club domestic league appearances and goals

Leong Chon Kit (梁俊傑; born 6 June 1980) is a Macanese former footballer who played as a goalkeeper for PSP Macau in the Liga de Elite. He made 17 appearances for the Macau national team.
