= Lexton Moy =

Filipino footballer (born 1985)

Personal information
- Full name: Lexton de la Cruz Moy
- Date of birth: 24 January 1985 (age 41)
- Place of birth: New York City, United States
- Height: 5 ft 6 in (1.68 m)
- Position: Midfielder

Youth career
- 2003–2004: Rutgers Scarlet Knights
- 2005–2007: Long Island University

Senior career*
Years	Team	Apps	(Gls)
2007	Laredo Heat	5	(0)
2008–2009	New York Athletic Club	12	(0)
2009–2010	Tai Chung	13	(1)
2011–2012	Kaya	14	(4)
2013	Lam Ieng	5	(0)

International career^{‡}
2011–2013	Philippines	10	(0)
- * Club domestic league appearances and goals as of 13:50, 26 June 2012 (UTC) ‡ National team caps and goals as of 14:20, 4 June 2013 (UTC)

Lexton de la Cruz Moy (Chinese: 梅示敦, born 24 January 1985) is a former footballer. He played as a midfielder and last played for Lam Ieng that competed in the Campeonato da 1ª Divisão do Futebol in Macau. He also stints in the Hong Kong First Division League and the United Football League (Philippines). Born in the United States, he represented the Philippines internationally.

== Football career ==
=== College and amateur ===
Moy started his college career at Rutgers University in New Brunswick, New Jersey. He broke his leg his freshmen year taking a medical red-shirt. During his recovery Moy joined the Rutgers Table Tennis Team and later rejoined the men's soccer team once he had medical clearance to resume training. In his following year, Moy saw limited action as a RU Scarlet Knight which prompted a transfer his junior year to Long Island University Brooklyn Campus. He captained the Men's NCAA Division I Long Island University Blackbird's his first year and played the remainder of his college eligibility at LIU.

During his college years, Moy played for the Laredo Heat in the USL Premier Development League capturing the National Championship in the 2007 PDL Season. He also played for the New York Athletic Club in the National Premier Soccer League in 2008 and 2009.

=== Professional ===
In the summer of 2009, Moy traveled to Hong Kong to try out for First Division team Biu Chun Rangers, formerly Fourway Athletics. Unpromising contract agreements prompted Moy to seek trials with Shatin Sports Association. After an unsuccessful try-out with the club, Moy moved on to the newly promoted second-division team Tai Chung FC. In August 2009, Moy signed a one-year contract with Tai Chung FC as a non-resident player. In the 2009–10 season, with his foreign player status, Moy started 9 matches and made 13 appearances. Moy registered his first and only goal on 19 September 2009 against Kitchee SC. Tai Chung FC's 2009–10 Hong Kong First Division League season culminated in a 1–1 draw against league champions South China AA to escape relegation for the 2010–11 season.

After his contract expired, Moy moved to Manila and signed with Kaya F.C., that competes in the United Football League (Philippines) on 16 August 2011. Moy played with Kaya FC in the 2011 United Football Cup. The team finished its 2011 Cup bout in fourth place after losing to Global FC in the Consolation match. Moy continued with the team's campaign in the 2012 United Football League (Philippines) and the 2012 United Football Cup. In 2012, Kaya FC finished second place in the UFL league, but was knocked out of Cup Tournament in the quarter-final round. From 2011 to 2012, Moy started 24 matches and made 26 appearances within 30 League and Cup competitions.

In 2013, Moy signed with Lam Ieng of the Campeonato da 1ª Divisão do Futebol, Macau's first division football league.

=== International ===
Upon moving to the Philippines in 2011, Moy joined the Philippines national football team. Moy was called up to the 20-man squad for the 2011 Long Teng Cup. Moy made his first appearance for the Azkals as a substitute to Ian Araneta in the match against Chinese Taipei in the 2011 Long Teng Cup which ended up with a scoreless draw. His second international cap was in the 2–0 win against Macau in the 2011 Long Teng Cup with the team's second-place finish behind Hong Kong. Moy later appeared in several exhibition matches against Internacional de Madrid CF, Al Ahli SC and LA Galaxy. Moy's international friendly appearances include a 1–0 loss to Australia U-23, and his first start for the Philippines national football team in a 1–1 draw against Malaysia. Moy was later called up to the 23-man roster for the 2012 AFC Challenge Cup (Squad List). In the 2012 AFC Challenge Cup, Moy made appearances in the 2–0 loss against North Korea and in the 2–1 loss against Turkmenistan, and the team finished in third place after a 4–3 win over Palestine in the cups'consultation match. Moy would later make appearances in 2012 Philippine Peace Cup, playing in the 1–0 win over Guam, 5–0 win over Macua and 3–1 win over Chinese Taipei.

Although being named to the 30 player Squad List for the 2012 AFF Suzuki Cup, Moy was not called to participate in the competition.

On 4 June 2013, Moy appeared in his last game for the Philippines in a 1–0 victory over Hong Kong in an International Friendly.

== Personal ==
Moy was born and raised in Chinatown, Manhattan. Moy grew up in a small apartment on Bayard Street overlooking Chinatown's Columbus park with his parents, Emelita Dela Cruz Moy and Way Ping Moy, his grand parents, Tsun Wan Chin and Gwong Kang Chin and his older sister Noreen Moy.
