= 2018 Liga de Elite =

Liga de Elite
- Season: 2018
- Champions: Benfica de Macau (5th title)
- Relegated: Lai Chi; Alfândega
- Matches: 90
- Goals: 463 (5.14 per match)
- Top goalscorer: (Brazil) William Gomes (41 goals)
- Biggest home win: Chao Pak Kei 15–0 Alfândega (3 June 2018)
- Biggest away win: Hang Sai 0-14 Chao Pak Kei; 26 January 2018; Lai Chi 0–14 Chao Pak Kei; 29 April 2018
- Highest scoring: Chao Pak Kei 15–0 Alfândega (3 June 2018)

The 2018 Liga de Elite was the 46th season of the Liga de Elite, the top Macanese league for association football clubs since its establishment in 1973. The season began on 19 January 2018 and ended on 1 July 2018.

== League table ==
Pos	Team	Pld	W	D	L	GF	GA	GD	Pts	Qualification or relegation
1	Benfica de Macau (C)	18	17	1	0	89	8	+81	52	
2	Chao Pak Kei	18	13	4	1	111	14	+97	43	
3	Sporting de Macau	18	12	2	4	55	17	+38	38	
4	Cheng Fung	18	11	3	4	38	21	+17	36	
5	Ka I	18	9	3	6	73	34	+39	30	
6	Monte Carlo	18	8	1	9	35	33	+2	25	
7	Hang Sai	18	4	2	12	20	89	−69	14	
8	Polícia	18	4	1	13	18	55	−37	13	
9	Lai Chi (R)	18	2	1	15	16	105	−89	7	Relegation to the 2ª Divisão de Macau
10	Alfândega (R)	18	1	0	17	8	87	−79	3	Relegation to the 2ª Divisão de Macau

Updated to match(es) played on 1 July 2018. Source: League Table
Rules for classification: 1) points; 2) goal difference; 3) number of goals scored.
(C) Champions; (R) Relegated

== Fixtures and results ==
=== Round 1 ===
19 January 2018	Monte Carlo	0–1	Hang Sai	Estádio Campo Desportivo
21:00 UTC+8		Report

20 January 2018	Chao Pak Kei	12–0	Lai Chi	Estádio Campo Desportivo
18:30 UTC+8		Report

20 January 2018	Benfica de Macau	2–1	Ka I	Estádio Campo Desportivo
20:30 UTC+8		Report

21 January 2018	Cheng Fung	1–0	Sporting de Macau	Estádio Campo Desportivo
14:00 UTC+8		Report

21 January 2018	Alfândega	0–4	Polícia	Estádio Campo Desportivo
16:00 UTC+8		Report

=== Round 2 ===
25 January 2018	Lai Chi	0–5	Benfica de Macau	Estádio Campo Desportivo
19:15 UTC+8		Report

25 January 2018	Polícia	1–2	Monte Carlo	Estádio Campo Desportivo
21:15 UTC+8		Report

26 January 2018	Hang Sai	0–14	Chao Pak Kei	Estádio Campo Desportivo
21:00 UTC+8		Report

27 January 2018	Ka I	0–0	Cheng Fung	Lin Fong Stadium
14:00 UTC+8		Report

27 January 2018	Sporting de Macau	5–0	Alfândega	Lin Fong Stadium
16:00 UTC+8		Report

=== Round 3 ===
2 February 2018	Polícia	3–2	Hang Sai	Estádio Campo Desportivo
21:00 UTC+8		Report

3 February 2018	Cheng Fung	6–1	Lai Chi	Estádio Campo Desportivo
18:30 UTC+8		Report

3 February 2018	Alfândega	0–9	Ka I	Estádio Campo Desportivo
20:30 UTC+8		Report

4 February 2018	Monte Carlo	1–1	Sporting de Macau	Estádio Campo Desportivo
14:00 UTC+8		Report

4 February 2018	Benfica de Macau	4–1	Chao Pak Kei	Estádio Campo Desportivo
16:00 UTC+8		Report

=== Round 4 ===
8 February 2018	Ka I	2–0	Monte Carlo	Estádio Campo Desportivo
19:15 UTC+8		Report

8 February 2018	Lai Chi	0–3	Alfândega	Estádio Campo Desportivo
21:15 UTC+8		Report

9 February 2018	Chao Pak Kei	1–1	Cheng Fung	Estádio Campo Desportivo
21:00 UTC+8		Report

11 February 2018	Sporting de Macau	5–0	Polícia	Estádio Campo Desportivo
14:00 UTC+8		Report

11 February 2018	Hang Sai	1–5	Benfica de Macau	Estádio Campo Desportivo
16:00 UTC+8		Report

=== Round 5 ===
23 February 2018	Polícia	0–2	Ka I	Estádio Campo Desportivo
21:00 UTC+8		Report

24 February 2018	Cheng Fung	0–7	Benfica de Macau	Estádio Campo Desportivo
18:30 UTC+8		Report

24 February 2018	Sporting de Macau	6–0	Hang Sai	Estádio Campo Desportivo
20:30 UTC+8		Report

25 February 2018	Alfândega	0–9	Chao Pak Kei	Estádio Campo Desportivo
19:00 UTC+8		Report

25 February 2018	Monte Carlo	4–0	Lai Chi	Estádio Campo Desportivo
21:00 UTC+8		Report

=== Round 6 ===
2 March 2018	Benfica de Macau	9–0	Alfândega	Estádio Campo Desportivo
21:00 UTC+8		Report		Referee: Dias

3 March 2018	Chao Pak Kei	4–2	Monte Carlo	Estádio Campo Desportivo
18:30 UTC+8		Report		Referee: Robesh

3 March 2018	Hang Sai	0–1	Cheng Fung	Estádio Campo Desportivo
20:30 UTC+8		Report		Referee: Ho Ka Shing

4 March 2018	Lai Chi	2–3	Polícia	Estádio Campo Desportivo
18:30 UTC+8		Report		Referee: Grant

4 March 2018	Ka I	2–3	Sporting de Macau	Estádio Campo Desportivo
20:30 UTC+8		Report		Referee: Dias

=== Round 7 ===
16 March 2018	Alfândega	0–3	Cheng Fung	Estádio Campo Desportivo
21:00 UTC+8		Report		Referee: Robesh

17 March 2018	Polícia	0–7	Chao Pak Kei	Estádio Campo Desportivo
18:30 UTC+8		Report		Referee: Ho Ka Shing

17 March 2018	Ka I	7–1	Hang Sai	Estádio Campo Desportivo
20:30 UTC+8		Report		Referee: Chan Jun

18 March 2018	Sporting de Macau	6–0	Lai Chi	Estádio Campo Desportivo
14:00 UTC+8		Report		Referee: Robesh

18 March 2018	Monte Carlo	0–2	Benfica de Macau	Estádio Campo Desportivo
16:00 UTC+8		Report		Referee: Grant

=== Round 8 ===
6 April 2018	Polícia	0–2	Benfica de Macau	Estádio Campo Desportivo
19:30 UTC+8		Report

7 April 2018	Hang Sai	2–1	Alfândega	Estádio Campo Desportivo
18:30 UTC+8		Report

7 April 2018	Sporting de Macau	1–2	Chao Pak Kei	Estádio Campo Desportivo
20:30 UTC+8		Report

8 April 2018	Ka I	11–1	Lai Chi	Estádio Campo Desportivo
18:30 UTC+8		Report

8 April 2018	Monte Carlo	0–1	Cheng Fung	Estádio Campo Desportivo
20:30 UTC+8		Report

=== Round 9 ===
13 April 2018	Ka I	1–1	Chao Pak Kei	Estádio Campo Desportivo
19:30 UTC+8		Report		Referee: Robesh

14 April 2018	Monte Carlo	5–0	Alfândega	Estádio Campo Desportivo
18:30 UTC+8		Report		Referee: Chan Jun

14 April 2018	Lai Chi	1–1	Hang Sai	Estádio Campo Desportivo
20:30 UTC+8		Report		Referee: Ho Ka Shing

15 April 2018	Polícia	0–3	Cheng Fung	Estádio Campo Desportivo
18:30 UTC+8		Report		Referee: Dais

15 April 2018	Sporting de Macau	1–5	Benfica de Macau	Estádio Campo Desportivo
20:30 UTC+8		Report		Referee: Robesh

=== Round 10 ===
27 April 2018	Polícia	1–0	Alfândega	Estádio Campo Desportivo
19:30 UTC+8		Report		Referee: Grant

28 April 2018	Sporting de Macau	1–0	Cheng Fung	Estádio Campo Desportivo
18:30 UTC+8		Report		Referee: Chan Jun

28 April 2018	Hang Sai	2–3	Monte Carlo	Estádio Campo Desportivo
20:30 UTC+8		Report		Referee: Ho Ka Shing

29 April 2018	Lai Chi	0–14	Chao Pak Kei	Estádio Campo Desportivo
18:30 UTC+8		Report		Referee: Dais

29 April 2018	Ka I	2–8	Benfica de Macau	Estádio Campo Desportivo
20:30 UTC+8		Report		Referee: Robesh

=== Round 11 ===
4 May 2018	Alfândega	0–2	Sporting de Macau	Estádio Campo Desportivo
19:30 UTC+8		Report		Referee: Dais

5 May 2018	Cheng Fung	2–2	Ka I	Estádio Campo Desportivo
18:30 UTC+8		Report		Referee: Robesh

5 May 2018	Chao Pak Kei	2–2	Hang Sai	Estádio Campo Desportivo
20:30 UTC+8		Report		Referee: Grant

6 May 2018	Monte Carlo	1–0	Polícia	Estádio Campo Desportivo
18:30 UTC+8		Report		Referee: Ho Ka Shing

6 May 2018	Benfica de Macau	8–0	Lai Chi	Estádio Campo Desportivo
20:30 UTC+8		Report		Referee: Robesh

=== Round 12 ===
11 May 2018	Chao Pak Kei	2–2	Benfica de Macau	Estádio Campo Desportivo
19:30 UTC+8		Report		Referee: Ho Ka Shing

12 May 2018	Lai Chi	0–9	Cheng Fung	Estádio Campo Desportivo
18:30 UTC+8		Report		Referee: Chan Jun

12 May 2018	Ka I	5–0	Alfândega	Estádio Campo Desportivo
20:30 UTC+8		Report		Referee: Ho Ka Shing

13 May 2018	Sporting de Macau	3–0	Monte Carlo	Estádio Campo Desportivo
18:30 UTC+8		Report		Referee: Grant

13 May 2018	Hang Sai	2–2	Polícia	Estádio Campo Desportivo
20:30 UTC+8		Report		Referee: Dais

=== Round 13 ===
25 May 2018	Polícia	0–6	Sporting de Macau	Estádio Campo Desportivo
19:30 UTC+8		Report		Referee: Robesh

26 May 2018	Alfândega	1–5	Lai Chi	Estádio Campo Desportivo
18:30 UTC+8		Report		Referee: Grant

26 May 2018	Monte Carlo	6–5	Ka I	Estádio Campo Desportivo
20:30 UTC+8		Report		Referee: Chan Jun

27 May 2018	Benfica de Macau	13–0	Hang Sai	Estádio Campo Desportivo
18:30 UTC+8		Report		Referee: Grant

27 May 2018	Cheng Fung	0–2	Chao Pak Kei	Estádio Campo Desportivo
20:30 UTC+8		Report		Referee: Dais

=== Round 14 ===
1 June 2018	Lai Chi	0–6	Monte Carlo	Estádio Campo Desportivo
19:30 UTC+8		Report		Referee: Grant

2 June 2018	Benfica de Macau	5–0	Cheng Fung	Estádio Campo Desportivo
18:30 UTC+8		Report		Referee: Grant

2 June 2018	Ka I	2–1	Polícia	Estádio Campo Desportivo
20:30 UTC+8		Report		Referee: Dais

3 June 2018	Chao Pak Kei	15–0	Alfândega	Estádio Campo Desportivo
18:30 UTC+8		Report		Referee: Chan Jun

3 June 2018	Hang Sai	1–6	Sporting de Macau	Estádio Campo Desportivo
20:30 UTC+8		Report		Referee: Dais

=== Round 15 ===
8 June 2018	Alfândega	0–5	Benfica de Macau	Estádio Campo Desportivo
19:30 UTC+8		Report		Referee: Chan Jun

9 June 2018	Monte Carlo	0–5	Chao Pak Kei	Estádio Campo Desportivo
18:30 UTC+8		Report		Referee: Grant

9 June 2018	Cheng Fung	4–1	Hang Sai	Estádio Campo Desportivo
20:30 UTC+8		Report		Referee: Dais

10 June 2018	Polícia	2–5	Lai Chi	Estádio Campo Desportivo
18:30 UTC+8		Report		Referee: Ho Ka Shing

10 June 2018	Sporting de Macau	3–2	Ka I	Estádio Campo Desportivo
20:30 UTC+8		Report		Referee: Chan Jun

=== Round 16 ===
15 June 2018	Cheng Fung	1–0	Alfândega	Estádio Campo Desportivo
19:30 UTC+8		Report		Referee: Chan Jun

16 June 2018	Lai Chi	0–5	Sporting de Macau	Estádio Campo Desportivo
18:30 UTC+8		Report		Referee: Ho Ka Shing

16 June 2018	Hang Sai	1–12	Ka I	Estádio Campo Desportivo
20:30 UTC+8		Report		Referee: Grant

17 June 2018	Chao Pak Kei	6–1	Polícia	Estádio Campo Desportivo
18:30 UTC+8		Report		Referee: Robesh

17 June 2018	Benfica de Macau	1–0	Monte Carlo	Estádio Campo Desportivo
20:30 UTC+8		Report		Referee: Chan Jun

=== Round 17 ===
22 June 2018	Lai Chi	0–7	Ka I	Estádio Campo Desportivo
19:30 UTC+8		Report

23 June 2018	Alfândega	0–3	Hang Sai	Estádio Campo Desportivo
18:30 UTC+8		Report

23 June 2018	Chao Pak Kei	1–1	Sporting de Macau	Estádio Campo Desportivo
20:30 UTC+8		Report

24 June 2018	Benfica de Macau	4–0	Polícia	Estádio Campo Desportivo
18:30 UTC+8		Report

24 June 2018	Cheng Fung	2–1	Monte Carlo	Estádio Campo Desportivo
20:30 UTC+8		Report

=== Round 18 ===
29 June 2018	Cheng Fung	4–0	Polícia	Estádio Campo Desportivo
19:30 UTC+8		Report		Referee: Robesh

30 June 2018	Alfândega	3–4	Monte Carlo	Estádio Campo Desportivo
18:30 UTC+8		Report		Referee: Dias

30 June 2018	Hang Sai	2–1	Lai Chi	Estádio Campo Desportivo
20:30 UTC+8		Report		Referee: Grant

1 July 2018	Chao Pak Kei	5–1	Ka I	Estádio Campo Desportivo
18:30 UTC+8		Report		Referee: Chan Jun

1 July 2018	Benfica de Macau	2–0	Sporting de Macau	Estádio Campo Desportivo
20:30 UTC+8		Report		Referee: Robesh

== Top scorers ==
Rank	Player	Team	Goals
1	(Brazil) William Gomes	Ka I	41
2	(Brazil) Danilo Lins	CPK	37
3	(Brazil) Diego Patriota	CPK	24
4	(Macau) Carlos Leonel	Benfica	20
5	(Macau) Niki Torrão	Benfica	19
5	(Nigeria) Prince Obus Aggreh	Sporting	19
7	(South Sudan) Tito Okello	Benfica	11
7	(Brazil) Denilson	CPK	11
9	(Brazil) Ronieli	Ching Fung	10
10	Noronha Guterres	Monte Carlo	9

== See also ==
- 2018 Taça de Macau
