= 2021 Liga de Elite =

Liga de Elite
- Season: 2021
- Dates: 12 March – 14 November
- Champions: Chao Pak Kei (2nd title)
- Relegated: Hang Sai
- AFC Cup: Chao Pak Kei
- Matches: 90
- Goals: 399 (4.43 per match)
- Top goalscorer: Carlos Leonel (35 goals)

The 2021 Liga de Elite was the 49th season of the Liga de Elite, the top Macanese league for association football clubs since its establishment in 1973. The season began on 12 March 2021 and ended on 14 November 2021.

== League table ==
Pos	Team	Pld	W	D	L	GF	GA	GD	Pts	Qualification or relegation
1	Chao Pak Kei (C)	18	18	0	0	115	4	+111	54	Qualification for AFC Cup group stage
2	Benfica de Macau	18	15	0	3	91	15	+76	45	
3	Ka I	18	11	2	5	29	30	−1	35	
4	Cheng Fung	18	10	0	8	40	44	−4	30	
5	Lun Lok	18	6	3	9	26	55	−29	21	
6	Sporting de Macau	18	6	2	10	33	45	−12	20	
7	Polícia	18	4	5	9	17	33	−16	17	
8	Casa de Portugal	18	4	4	10	22	68	−46	16	
9	Monte Carlo	18	2	6	10	14	46	−32	12	
10	Hang Sai (R)	18	2	2	14	12	59	−47	8	Relegation to 2ª Divisão de Macau

Source: Soccerway
Rules for classification: 1) points; 2) goal difference; 3) number of goals scored.
(C) Champions; (R) Relegated

== Results ==
Home \ Away	BEN	CDP	CPK	CHF	HNS	KAI	LUL	MCL	POL	SPO
Benfica de Macau		6–2	1–4	2–3	7–0	8–0	7–0	1–0	6–0	7–1
Casa de Portugal	0–12		0–12	5–1	1–2	0–2	1–3	3–1	0–0	2–1
Chao Pak Kei	2–0	14–0		10–0	3–0	3–0	9–0	11–1	4–0	7–0
Cheng Fung	0–6	4–2	0–5		1–0	0–1	3–4	1–0	2–1	5–1
Hang Sai	1–7	4–0	0–8	0–5		0–3	1–3	0–3	1–3	1–5
Ka I	1–3	2–1	2–7	3–2	0–0		2–0	3–1	2–0	0–3
Lun Lok	0–5	2–2	0–6	1–5	1–0	0–4		4–1	1–1	1–2
Monte Carlo	0–6	1–1	0–5	0–4	1–0	0–0	2–2		0–2	1–1
Polícia	0–3	0–0	0–3	1–0	2–2	1–2	0–3	1–1		3–0
Sporting de Macau	1–4	1–2	0–2	2–4	6–0	1–2	4–1	1–1	3–2	

Source: Soccerway
Legend: Blue = home team win; Yellow = draw; Red = away team win.
For upcoming matches, an "a" indicates there is an article about the rivalry between the two participants.

== See also ==
- 2021 Taça de Macau
