= Rodolfo Kumbrevicius =

Footballer

Personal information
- Full name: Rodolfo Kumbrevicius Adorno de Oliviera
- Date of birth: 13 July 1981 (age 45)
- Place of birth: Brazil
- Position: Forward

Senior career*
| Years | Team | Apps | (Gls) |
- Brazilian clubs
| 2004 | Raufoss IL | | |
- Brazilian clubs
| 2005 | VfL Oldenburg | | |
| 2006 | XV de Novembro | | |
| 2006–20xx | Penafiel | | |
| 2007 | FC Vilnius | | |
| 2007–2008 | Al Sahel | | |
- Brazilian clubs
| 2009 | Jiangsu Sainty | 6 | (0) |
| 2010 | Vitória | | |
| 2010 | Batatais | | |
| 2011 | Birkirkara | 10 | (3) |
| 2011–2012 | Santo André | | |
- * Club domestic league appearances and goals

Rodolfo Kumbrevicius (Chinese: 罗多福; born 13 July 1981), sometimes known as Alemão, is a Brazilian former professional footballer who played as a forward.

== Career ==
Kumbrevicius trialled with Norwegian club Molde in July 2004.

=== Germany ===
Arriving at VfL Oldenburg on 9 July 2005, Rodolfo hit three goals during his first friendly appearance between Oldenburg's senior and youth sides at the summer festival, but was out with a hip injury that October, and had to leave a month later seeing that his father was seriously ill.

=== Lithuania ===
Participating in FC Vilnius' 2007 training camp in Turkey, the Brazilian regarded the top division as very physical, but was attacked by FBK Kaunas trainer Angel Chervenkov that June, who was fined. However, the moribund Vilnius were eventually dissolved and ceased to exist by 2008.

=== Kuwait ===
Working out on a move to Al Sahel SC as August 2007 got underway, Kumbrevicius was offered the possibility of adding another year to his contract at the conclusion of the season, but decided to postpone the chance to review other offers.

=== China ===
Rewarded a deal at Jiangsu Sainty mid-season 2009, the then 28-year old replaced Qin Sheng away to Shanghai Shenhua. Listening to the fans advice to give him more game time, Pei Encai started him as Jiangsu held Qingdao Jonoon 0–0 but he was unable to register a shot the entire first half, going on to appear four more times without a goal.

=== Malta ===
Unveiled as one of Birkirkara's 2011 additions, the target man stated that Maltese football needed to improve on management and the quality of pitches. Debuting during the Stripes 1–0 victory over Vittoriosa Stars, he was shown the door alongside three other foreign imports as the summer got underway.

== Personal life ==
His grandfather from the country, he is able to speak basic phrases in Lithuanian.
