= Kei Cheong =

- Full name: Kei Cheong
- Ground: Macau
- League: Campeonato da 1ª Divisão do Futebol

Kei Cheong (Traditional Chinese: 乾忠) is a Macau football club, which plays in Macao. They play in the Macau's first division, the Campeonato da 1ª Divisão do Futebol.

== Achievements ==
- Macau Championship: 0
