= Cheang Chon Man =

Macau footballer and manager

Personal information
- Full name: Chu Hon Ming William
- Date of birth: 22 June 1971 (age 55)
- Place of birth: Macau
- Position: Forward

Senior career*
Years	Team	Apps	(Gls)
1993–1994	G.D. Negro Rubro		
2004–2005	PSP Macau		(20)
2006	G.D. Lam Pak		
2008–2012	Hong Ngai		

International career
2001–2006	Macau		

Managerial career
- 2012–: PSP Macau
- * Club domestic league appearances and goals

Cheang Chon Man (鄭俊文,born June 22, 1971) is a Macau professional football player and manager. He plays as a striker for clubs G.D. Negro Rubro, PSP Macau, G.D. Lam Pak and Hong Ngai. Since 2012 he is a coach of the PSP Macau.

== Honours ==
- Macau Championship: 2

2005, 2006
