= Alfredo Cano =

Argentine footballer (born 1982)

Personal information
- Birth name: Alfredo Virginio Cano
- Date of birth: 30 August 1982 (age 44)
- Place of birth: Posadas, Argentina
- Height: 1.80 m (5 ft 11 in)
- Position: Forward

Senior career*
Years	Team	Apps	(Gls)
2003–2004	Olimpo de Bahía Blanca	3	(0)
2004	Sportivo Eldorado de Misiones	6	(2)
2005	San Luis	13	(0)
2006	Guaraní Antonio Franco	4	(0)
2007–2008	2 de Mayo	37	(8)
2009–2010	Sol de América	38	(2)
2010	Luqueño	17	(1)
2011–2012	Atlético Colegiales		
2012–2017	Club General Díaz	123	(24)
- * Club domestic league appearances and goals

Alfredo Virginio Cano (born 30 August 1982) is an Argentine former professional footballer who played as a forward.
