= Estevão Toniato =

Brazilian footballer (born 1979)

Estevao Toniato
Personal information
- Full name: Estevao Alvarenga Toniato
- Date of birth: 6 April 1979 (age 47)
- Place of birth: Brazil
- Position: Defender

Senior career*
Years	Team	Apps	(Gls)
-2000	Clube Atlético Mineiro		
1999-2000	Uberlândia Esporte Clube→(loan)		
2000	Social Futebol Clube		
2001	S.L. Benfica	0	(0)
2001	Associação Desportiva Ferroviária Vale do Rio Doce		
2001	Entrerriense Futebol Clube		
2002-2003	Rio Branco Atlético Clube		
2004	Sport Club do Recife		
2004	Rio Branco Atlético Clube		
2005	Império Toledo de Futebol		
2005	Estrela do Norte Futebol Clube		
2005-2009	Stade Tunisien		
2009	Beijing Renhe F.C.	26	(0)
2010-2011	Rio Branco Atlético Clube		
2012	Real Noroeste Capixaba Futebol Clube		
- * Club domestic league appearances and goals

Estevão Alvarenga Toniato (born 6 April 1979 in Brazil) is a Brazilian retired footballer who last played for Real Noroeste Capixaba Futebol Clube in his home country.

== Career ==
Toniato started his senior career with Clube Atlético Mineiro. After that, he played for Uberlândia Esporte Clube, Social Futebol Clube, S.L. Benfica, Associação Desportiva Ferroviária Vale do Rio Doce, Entrerriense Futebol Clube, Rio Branco Atlético Clube, Sport Club do Recife, Império Toledo de Futebol, Estrela do Norte Futebol Clube, and Stade Tunisien. In 2009, he signed for Beijing Renhe in the Chinese Super League, where he made twenty-six league appearances and scored zero goals.
