= Chuac Lun =

- Full name: Lai Chi Football Club
- Ground: Campo de Futebol da UCTM, 1,700 capacity
- League: Liga de Elite (1st Division)

Chuac Lun Football Club, simply known as Chuac Lun is a football team based in Macau S.A.R., China. Currently, Chuac Lun plays in the Liga de Elite, previously known as Campeonato da 1ª Divisão do Futebol, organized by the Associação de Futebol de Macau.

== Current squad ==
Season 2016.

Note: Flags indicate national team as defined under FIFA eligibility rules; some limited exceptions apply. Players may hold more than one non-FIFA nationality.

No.	Pos.	Nation	Player
2	MF	MAC	Abrantes
8	MF	MAC	Chan Man Hou
10	DF	MAC	Miguel Sou
11	MF	MAC	Ieong Ka Hong
11	FW	MAC	Mak Ka Chon
21	GK	MAC	Xavier Cheang
38	DF	POR	Nuno Capela
