= Hong Ngai =

- Full name: Associação de Desportivo de Hong Ngai de Macau
- Ground: Campo Desportivo da UCTM & Estádio Campo Desportivo; Macau
- Capacity: 1,700 & 16,000
- League: Campeonato da 1ª Divisão do Futebol
| Home colours | Away colours |

Hong Ngai is a Macau football club, which plays in the town of Macau. They played in the Macau's first division, the Campeonato da 1ª Divisão do Futebol but were relegated from the 3ª Divisão de Macau after the 2022 season.

== Achievements ==
- Macau Championship:

== Current squad ==
Note: Flags indicate national team as defined under FIFA eligibility rules; some limited exceptions apply. Players may hold more than one non-FIFA nationality.

| No. | Pos. | Nation | Player |
|---|---|---|---|
| 3 | MF | (China) CHN | Guan Zhichao |
| 6 | DF | (China) CHN | Liang Jingwen |
| 7 | MF | (China) CHN | Chen Yuqiu |

| No. | Pos. | Nation | Player |
|---|---|---|---|
| 11 | FW | (China) CHN | Xie Minghua |
| 12 | FW | (Macau) MAC | Mak Ka Chon |
| 13 | DF | (Hong Kong) HKG | Poon Man Tik |
| 14 | FW | (Macau) MAC | Cheang Chon Man |
| 21 | MF | (Macau) MAC | Cheok Hou Kei |
| 23 | DF | (Macau) MAC | Chan Iok Seng |
