= Lam Ieng =

Clube Desportivo Lam Ieng
- Full name: Associação Desportiva Ka I
- Ground: Campo Desportivo da UCTM & Estádio Campo Desportivo; Macau
- Capacity: 1,700 & 16,000
- League: Campeonato da 1ª Divisão do Futebol
- 2012: 7th
Home colours	Away colours

Lam Ieng is a Macau football club, which plays in the town of Macau. They played in the Macau's first division, the Campeonato da 1ª Divisão do Futebol and had been withdrawn due to financial reasons.

== Achievements ==
- Macau Championship:

== Current squad ==
Note: Flags indicate national team as defined under FIFA eligibility rules; some limited exceptions apply. Players may hold more than one non-FIFA nationality.

No.	Pos.	Nation	Player
1	GK	(Macau) MAC	Chan Ka Kei
2	FW	(China) CHN	Pi Siwei
4	DF	(Macau) MAC	Mok Tsa Yeung
6	FW	(China) CHN	Chen Haibin
8	MF	(Macau) MAC	Leonardo Im de Abrantes
10	FW	(Macau) MAC	Mok Kin Fong
11	MF	(China) CHN	Huang Jiafu
12	DF	(Macau) MAC	Lam Ka Chon
13	DF	(Macau) MAC	Ao Ieong Tong
18	DF	(Macau) MAC	Miguel Sou

No.	Pos.	Nation	Player
19	FW	(Macau) MAC	Lei Fu Weng
21	MF	(Macau) MAC	Wong Kuok Leong
22	GK	(Macau) MAC	Ku Seng Chong
23	MF	(Macau) MAC	Chan Tsz Yeung
24	MF	(China) CHN	He Yihui
25	MF	(Philippines) PHI	Lexton Moy
66	FW	(Macau) MAC	Chiang Ka Chon
?	DF	(China) CHN	Li Zhihai
?	MF	(China) CHN	Chen Qian
?	MF	(China) CHN	Zhang Chuan
