= Hang Sai SC =

- Full name: Hang Sai Sports Club
- Founded: 2009; 17 years ago
- Ground: Lin Fong Stadium
- Capacity: 2,000
- League: Liga de Elite
- 2024: Liga de Elite, 4th
- Website: Website
Home colours	Away colours

Hang Sai SC (Chinese: 澳門恆勢體育會) is a Macanese professional football club which currently competes in the Liga de Elite.

== History ==
In 2017, Hang Sai won the 2ª Divisão de Macau title and were promoted to the top flight for the first time.

== Current squad ==
Squad for the 2026 Liga de Elite

Note: Flags indicate national team as defined under FIFA eligibility rules; some limited exceptions apply. Players may hold more than one non-FIFA nationality.

No.	Pos.	Nation	Player
1	GK	MAC	Chi-Him Travis Cheong
2	DF	JPN	Anand Usada
7	MF	HKG	Kai-Chun Cheung

No.	Pos.	Nation	Player
12	DF	MAC	Ka-Chon Lam (captain)
66	DF	MAC	Pak-Kin Lao
99	FW	POR	Hugo Almeida

== See also ==
- Ka I 21–18 Hang Sai
