= Serviços de Alfândega =

Alfândega
- Full name: Clube Desportivo dos Serviços de Alfândega
- Founded: 1998
- Ground: Estádio Campo Desportivo
- Capacity: 16,272
- League: Liga de Elite
- 2017: 2nd (promoted)
Home colours	Away colours

Clube Desportivo dos Serviços de Alfândega (Chinese: 海關) is a Macanese football club which currently competes in the Liga de Elite.

== Squad 2011 ==
Note: Flags indicate national team as defined under FIFA eligibility rules; some limited exceptions apply. Players may hold more than one non-FIFA nationality.

No. / Pos. / Nation / Player; 2 / DF / MAC / Ieong Lap Tak	No. / Pos. / Nation / Player; 9 / FW / MAC / Leong Chong In
