= Kuan Tai =

- Full name: Associação Desportiva Cultural Kuan Tai
- Ground: Macau
- League: Campeonato da 1ª Divisão do Futebol
- 2012: 6th

Kuan Tai (Chinese: 關帝文化; Portuguese: Associação Desportiva Cultural Kuan Tai) is a Macau football club, which plays in Macao. The team have been withdrawn from the Macau's first division, the Campeonato da 1ª Divisão do Futebol in 2014, due to financial reasons.
