= Vá Luen =

- Full name: Vá Luen
- Ground: Campo Desportivo da UCTM
- Capacity: 1,700
- League: Campeonato da 2ª Divisão do Futebol
- 2011: 12 th, Campeonato da 1ª Divisão do Futebol
Home colours	Away colours

Vá Luen (Chinese: 華聯體育會) is a Macanese professional football club that competes in Macau's second division, the Campeonato da 2ª Divisão do Futebol.

== History ==
They played the 2010 season in the Macau's first division, the Campeonato da 1ª Divisão do Futebol and was relegated in November 2010.
