= Macau University of Science and Technology Sports Field =

Football stadium in Macau

Coordinates: 22°09′09″N 113°34′05″E

Macau University of Science and Technology Football Field 澳門科技大學運動場
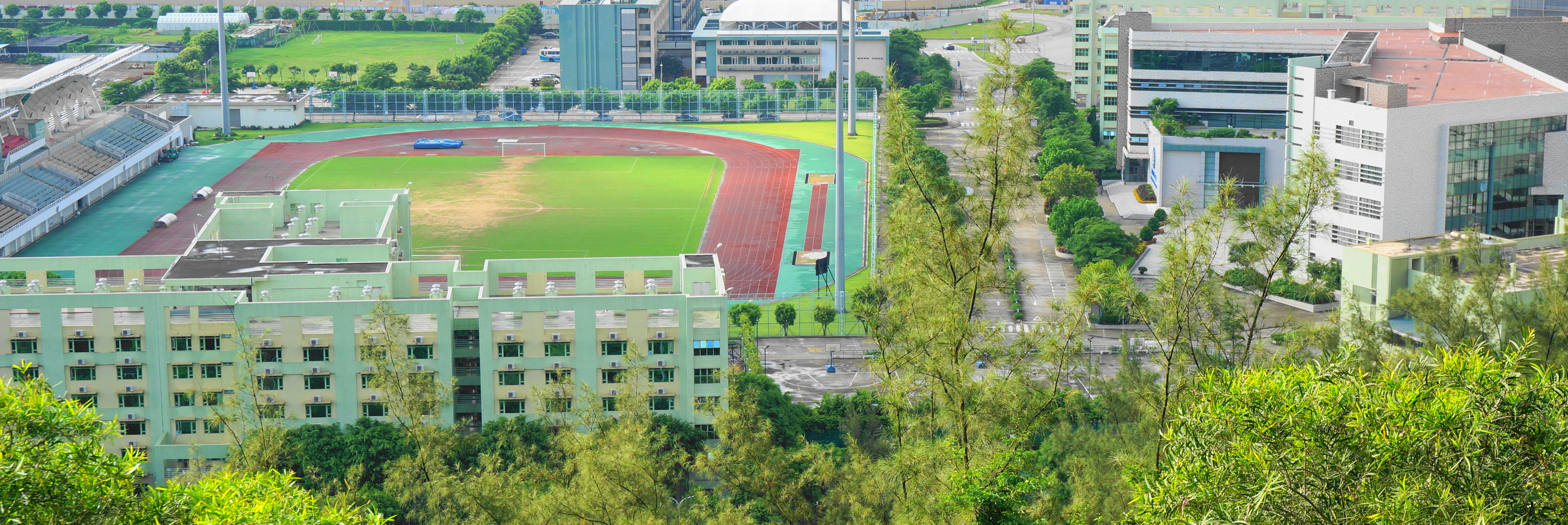
- Interactive map of Macau University of Science and Technology Football Field 澳門科技大學運動場
- Location: Av.Wai Long, University of Science and Technology Football Field, Block I, Taipa, Macau
- Owner: Macau University of Science and Technology
- Operator: Macau Sports Institute
- Capacity: 1,684
- Surface: Grass; 105m X 68m

Construction
- Opened: October 2005

Tenant
- Macau Football Association

The Macau University of Science and Technology Football Field (Chinese: 澳門科技大學運動場) is a football stadium in Taipa, Macau, China. It is used mainly for Macau First Division Football League matches and athletics.

== Notable events ==
- 2005 East Asian Games
- 2006 Hong Kong–Macau Interport

== See also ==
- Sports in Macau
