= Casa de Portugal em Macau =

Clube Desportivo da Casa de Portugal em Macau
- Full name: Clube Desportivo Casa de Portugal em Macau
- Founded: 2001
- Ground: Lin Fong Stadium
- Capacity: 2,000
- Chairman: Maria Amélia Saldanha
- Manager: Pelé
- League: 3ª Divisão de Macau
- 2024: 3rd Division, 12 of 12. relegation.
Home colours	Away colours

Clube Desportivo da Casa de Portugal em Macau is a football club based in Macau. The club most currently competed in the 3ª Divisão de Macau.

== History ==
Founded in 2001 under the name Casa de Portugal em Macau in behalf of the defense and promotion of Portuguese language and culture to all interested parties.

Since then, the club has won two 2ª Divisão de Macau titles, besides that the team has also played in Liga de Elite, however the team was never successful in its campaigns and ended up relegated in 2016 season, but the team bounced back and won the second division again, so it was promoted in 2019 season.

== Honours ==
=== League ===
- 2ª Divisão de Macau
  - Champions (2): 2014, 2019

== See also ==
- Sports in Macau
