= Lai Chi (football) =

Macanese football club

- Full name: Clube Desportivo“Os Velozes” Lai Chi Sports Association; Clube Desportivo «Os Velozes» Clube Desportivo Os Velozes; Lai Chi T’ai Iok Vui
- Founded: 1988
- Ground: Lin Fong Stadium
- Capacity: 2,000
- League: 3ª Divisão de Macau
- 2018: Liga de Elite, 9th (relegated)
Home colours	Away colours

Lai Chi Sports Association (Chinese: 勵馳體育會), often abbreviated to Lai Chi, is a Macanese football team.

== Recent history ==
Lai Chi play in the Terceira Divisão beginning in 2025 because they finished in the third place in the 2024 Junior Divisão. It competed in the Junior Divisão—the fourth level of Football in Macau and had competed in the 2ª Divisão de Macau. previously.
