= FC Porto de Macau =

Association football club in Macau

- Full name: Casa do F.C. Porto em Macau
- Founded: 2006; 20 years ago
- Ground: Estádio de Macau
- Capacity: 16,272
- Chairman: António Aguiar
- League: Terceira Divisão
Home colours	Away colours

F.C. Porto de Macau (Chinese: 澳門波爾圖足球會; Portuguese: Casa do Futebol Clube do Porto de Macao) is a football club based in Macau which plays in the Terceira Divisão, the third level of football in Macau. The team was formerly a feeder club to FC Porto.

The club had previously played in the Macau's first division, the Campeonato da 1ª Divisão do Futebol, but was relegated from the top tier in 2013. In the 2019 season, they returned to the fourth division, the Junior Divisão.
