= Polícia de Segurança Pública (football) =

Polícia
- Full name: Polícia de Segurança Pública
- Ground: Lin Fong Stadium
- Capacity: 2,000
- Manager: Cheang Chon Man
- League: Liga de Elite
- 2021: Liga de Elite, 7th of 10
Home colours	Away colours

Polícia de Segurança Pública (Traditional Chinese: 警察) is a Macanese professional football team which had competed in the Liga de Elite but withdrew from the 2022 season due to COVID-19.

== Achievements ==
- Macau Championship: 4

1949, 1973, 2000, 2005

== Current squad ==
As of 26 March 2017.

Note: Flags indicate national team as defined under FIFA eligibility rules; some limited exceptions apply. Players may hold more than one non-FIFA nationality.

No.	Pos.	Nation	Player
1	GK	MAC	Leong Chon Kit
4	MF	MAC	Cheng Lam Wai
5	MF	MAC	Lam Man Leong
6	MF	MAC	Wong Wai
7	MF	MAC	Hoi Wai Tong
8	MF	MAC	Cheong Loi
9	FW	MAC	Ng Chi Fai
10	MF	MAC	Leong Lap San
11	MF	MAC	Chan Chon Fai
13	DF	MAC	Fonh Ka Lok
16	MF	MAC	Choi Kuok Wai
17	MF	MAC	Chan Weng Son

No.	Pos.	Nation	Player
18	DF	MAC	Un Tak Ian
19	DF	MAC	Ho Kin Tong
20	MF	MAC	Chong Iat Chi
21	FW	MAC	Herculano Monteiro
22	DF	MAC	Lei Chi Wa
24	MF	MAC	Chan Chi Ieng
25	MF	MAC	Leong Chan Pong
26	DF	MAC	Lei Seng Weng
27	DF	MAC	Lam Ioi Chi
38	FW	MAC	Lai Kwok Ho
82	GK	MAC	Sou Kowk Ho
—	GK	MAC	Lei Tong

== Performance in AFC competitions ==
- Asian Club Championship: 1 appearance

2001: First Round
