= 2012 Hong Kong–Macau Interport =

68th Hong Kong–Macau Interport
- Event: Hong Kong–Macau Interport
Macau	Hong Kong
1	3
- Date: June 16, 2012
- Venue: Macau Stadium, Macau
- Referee: Tou Lap Meng
- Weather: Rainy, wet and hot

The 68th Hong Kong–Macau Interport was an association football match held in Macau on 16 June 2012. Macau were the defending champions as they captured the champion by winning 1-0 the previous year.

== Squads ==
=== Hong Kong ===
Hong Kong was represented by its under-22 national team.

- Head Coach: (Australia) Ernie Merrick
- Coaches: Poon Man Tik, Szeto Man Chun, Fan Chun Yip
- Technical Director: Steve O'Connor

No.	Pos.	Player	Date of birth (age)	Caps	Club
1	GK	Tsang Man Fai			(Hong Kong) Kam Fung
2	DF	Li Ngai Hoi			(Hong Kong) Kitchee
4	MF	Fong Pak Lun			(Hong Kong) Sham Shui Po
5	DF	Chan Cham Hei			(Hong Kong) South China
6	MF	Ngan Lok Fung			(Hong Kong) Kitchee
7	FW	James Ha			(Hong Kong) Kitchee
8	MF	Chan Pak Hang			(Hong Kong) South China
9	FW	Lam Hok Hei			(Hong Kong) Kam Fung
10	MF	Lau Cheuk Hin			(Hong Kong) Sham Shui Po
11	MF	Kot Cho Wai			(Hong Kong) South China
12	MF	Lee Ka Yiu			(Hong Kong) Sham Shui Po
13	MF	Chan Siu Kwan			(Hong Kong) Sham Shui Po
14	MF	Tam Lok Hin			(Hong Kong) Kam Fung
15	MF	Wong Wai			(Hong Kong) Sham Shui Po
16	DF	Wong Yim Kwan			Hong Kong Sapling
17	FW	Tsang Kin Fong			(Hong Kong) Kitchee
19	GK	Chiu Yu Ming			(Hong Kong) Southern District
20	DF	Lo Kong Wai			(Hong Kong) Sham Shui Po
21	DF	Lee Ka Ho			(Hong Kong) Sham Shui Po
23	MF	Choi Kwok Wai			Hong Kong Sapling
25	DF	Li Shu Yeung			Hong Kong Sapling

Note: Leung Kwun Chung was original selected in the main squad. However, he resigned due to injury. Wong Yim Kwan and Lo Kong Wai were then selected to the squad.

=== Macau ===
- Chief Manager: Victor Cheung Lup Kwan
- Manager: Chong Coc Veng, Sin Chi Yiu, Chang Chin Nam
- Head Coach: (Hong Kong) Leung Sui Wing
- Coaches: Ku Chan Kuong, Iong Cho Ieng, Chu Hon Ming
- Physio: Lao Chi Leong

No.	Pos.	Player	Date of birth (age)	Caps	Club
1	GK	Ho Man Fai			(Macau) MFA Develop
2	DF	Choi Chan In			(Macau) MFA Develop
3	DF	Leung Chon In			(Macau) G.D. Lam Pak
4	MF	Chow Wai Fung			(Macau) MFA Develop
5	DF	Lam Ka Pou			(Macau) G.D. Lam Pak
6	MF	Tang Hou Fai			(Macau) MFA Develop
7	MF	Sio Ka Un			(Macau) MFA Develop
8	FW	De Jesus Morais Alves Vinicio			
9	FW	Leong Ka Hang			(Macau) MFA Develop
10	MF	Kaewchang Capelo Iuri			(Macau) MFA Develop
11	FW	Nicholas Torrão			(Macau) Windsor Arch Ka I
12	MF	Loi Wai Hong			(Macau) MFA Develop
13	DF	Cheang Cheng Ieong Paulo			
14	DF	Lee Ka Him			(Macau) MFA Develop
15	DF	Lee Tin U			(Macau) MFA Develop
16	DF	Chan Man			(Macau) C.D. Monte Carlo
17	MF	Tung Man Wai			(Macau) MFA Develop
18	MF	Chan Kin Seng			(Macau) C.D. Monte Carlo
19	FW	Pang Zhi Hang			(Macau) Windsor Arch Ka I
20	MF	Chao Wai Hou			(Macau) C.D. Monte Carlo
21	DF	Lee Chi Wa			(Macau) G.D. Lam Pak
22	GK	Ngan Kai Iek			(Macau) MFA Develop

== Results ==
16 June 2012
15:00 GMT+8

Macau	1 – 3	Hong Kong
Torrao 51' (yellow card) 65'	Report	19' Chan Pak Hang; 74' Lee Ka Yiu; 88' Tsang Kin Fong; (yellow card) 90' Lau Cheuk Hin

Macau Stadium, Macau
Referee: Tou Lap Meng
