= 2015 Hong Kong–Macau Interport =

71st Hong Kong–Macau Interport
- Event: Hong Kong–Macau Interport
Hong Kong	Macau
2	0
- Date: 14 November 2015
- Venue: Siu Sai Wan Sports Ground, Siu Sai Wan, Hong Kong
- Referee: Lau Fong Hei
- Attendance: 1,318

The 71st Hong Kong–Macau Interport is an association football match held in Hong Kong on 14 November 2015. Hong Kong captured their 55th title by winning 2–0.

== Squads ==
=== Hong Kong ===
No.	Pos.	Player	Date of birth (age)	Caps	Goals	Club
	GK	Yuen Ho Chun	19 July 1995 (aged 20)			Hong Kong Pegasus
	GK	Chiu Yu Ming	9 November 1991 (aged 24)			(Hong Kong) Yuen Long
	DF	Tse Long Hin	6 February 1995 (aged 20)			(Hong Kong) Dreams Metro Gallery
	DF	Wong Tsz Ho	7 March 1994 (aged 21)			(Hong Kong) Dreams Metro Gallery
	DF	Tsang Kam To	21 June 1989 (aged 26)			(Hong Kong) Eastern
	DF	Leung Kwun Chung	1 April 1992 (aged 23)			Hong Kong Pegasus
	DF	Leung Nok Hang	14 November 1994 (aged 21)			Hong Kong Pegasus
	DF	Che Runqiu	23 October 1990 (aged 25)			(Hong Kong) South China
	DF	Chan Hin Kwong	27 February 1988 (aged 27)			(Hong Kong) Yuen Long
	MF	Lau Ho Lam	22 January 1993 (aged 22)			(Hong Kong) Dreams Metro Gallery
	MF	Lee Ka Yiu	10 April 1992 (aged 23)			Hong Kong Pegasus
	MF	Michael Luk	22 August 1986 (aged 29)			(Hong Kong) KC Southern
	MF	Emmet Wan	13 March 1992 (aged 23)			(Hong Kong) KC Southern
	MF	Chan Siu Kwan	1 August 1992 (aged 23)			(Hong Kong) South China
	MF	Ip Chung Long	16 November 1989 (aged 25)			(Hong Kong) Yuen Long
	MF	Tam Lok Hin	12 January 1991 (aged 24)			(Hong Kong) Yuen Long
	FW	Hui Ka Lok	5 January 1994 (aged 21)			(Hong Kong) BC Rangers
	FW	Hui Wang Fung	4 February 1994 (aged 21)			(Hong Kong) BC Rangers
	FW	Lo Kong Wai	19 June 1992 (aged 23)			Hong Kong Pegasus
	FW	Lam Hok Hei	18 September 1991 (aged 24)			(Hong Kong) South China

=== Macau ===
No.	Pos.	Player	Date of birth (age)	Caps	Goals	Club
	GK	Ho Man Fai	24 April 1993 (aged 22)			(Macau) Monte Carlo
	GK	Fong Chi Hang	26 October 1989 (aged 26)			(Macau) Monte Carlo
	DF	Cheang Cheng Ieong	18 August 1984 (aged 31)			(Macau) Monte Carlo
	DF	Lao Pak Kin	22 May 1984 (aged 31)			(Macau) Windsor Arch Ka I
	DF	Lei Ka Him	16 August 1991 (aged 24)			(Macau) Lai Chi
	DF	Chan Man	4 October 1993 (aged 22)			Benfica de Macau
	DF	Chan Pak Chun	5 December 1985 (aged 29)			Sporting Clube de Macau
	DF	Lei Chi Kin	24 October 1990 (aged 25)			Benfica de Macau
	DF	Kong Cheng Hou	2 August 1986 (aged 29)			(Macau) Windsor Arch Ka I
	MF	Kou Ut Cheong	21 May 1992 (aged 23)			(Macau) Chao Pak Kei
	MF	Leung Chon In	8 July 1987 (aged 28)			(Macau) Chao Pak Kei
	MF	Sio Ka Un	16 March 1992 (aged 23)			(Macau) Lai Chi
	MF	Lam Ka Seng	28 May 1994 (aged 21)			(Macau) MFA Develop
	MF	Leong Tak Wai	28 June 1993 (aged 22)			(Macau) Chao Pak Kei
	MF	Niki Torrão	18 November 1987 (aged 27)			Benfica de Macau
	MF	Cheong Hoi San	28 June 1998 (aged 17)			(Macau) MFA Development
	FW	Pang Chi Hang	3 November 1993 (aged 22)			(Macau) Lai Chi
	FW	Lee Keng Pan	28 February 1990 (aged 25)			(Macau) Windsor Arch Ka I

== Results ==
14 November 2015
15:00 UTC+8

Hong Kong	2–0	Macau
Hui Ka Lok 64'; Chan Siu Kwan 80'	Report

Siu Sai Wan Sports Ground, Hong Kong
Attendance: 1,318
Referee: Lau Fong Hei
