= 2011 Hong Kong–Macau Interport =

The 67th Hong Kong–Macau Interport is an association football match held in Macau on 11 June 2011. Macau captured the champion by winning 1-0.

== Squads ==
=== Hong Kong ===
Hong Kong was represented by its under-21 national team.

- Manager: Brian Leung Hung Tak, Wong Wai Shun
- Deputy Manager: Philip Lee Fai Lap
- Head coach: Szeto Man Chun
- Assistant coaches: Poon Man Tik, Yeung Ching Kwong, Chan Chi Hong
- Goalkeeper coach: Fan Chun Yip

No.	Pos.	Player	Date of birth (age)	Caps	Club
1	GK	Chiu Yu Ming			(Hong Kong) NT Realty Wofoo Tai Po
17	GK	Tin Man Ho			(Hong Kong) Wan Chai
2	DF	Lai Tze Fung			(Hong Kong) Biu Chun
3	DF	Wong Chui Shing			(Hong Kong) Yuen Long
4	DF	Ma Siu Kwan			(Hong Kong) Tuen Mun
5	DF	Yuen Tsun Tung			(Hong Kong) Yuen Long
6	DF	Chan Sze Chun			(Hong Kong) Citizen
13	DF	Cheung Chun Hei			(Hong Kong) South China
18	DF	Chan Cham Hei			(Hong Kong) Fourway Rangers
7	MF	Kot Cho Wai			(Hong Kong) South China
8	MF	Wong Wai			(Hong Kong) Sham Shui Po
10	MF	Tse Tin Yau			(Hong Kong) Fourway Rangers
11	MF	Luk Pak Hei			(Hong Kong) NT Realty Wofoo Tai Po
12	MF	Li Ka Chun			(Hong Kong) Kitchee
15	MF	Yan Wai Hong			(Hong Kong) Sun Hei
16	MF	Choi Kwok Wai			(Hong Kong) Yuen Long
20	MF	Li Shu Yeung			(Hong Kong) Yuen Long
21	MF	Yan Pak Long			(Hong Kong) Tuen Mun
9	FW	Nam Wing Hang			(Hong Kong) Tuen Mun
14	FW	Chan Ho Fung			(Hong Kong) Tai Chung

=== Macau ===
- Manager: Daniel Delgado de Sousa
- Head coach: (Hong Kong) Leung Sui Wing
- Coaches: Ku Chan Kuong, Iong Cho Ieng, Chu Hon Ming
- Physio: Lao Chi Leong
- Admin: Leong Ian Teng

No.	Pos.	Player	Date of birth (age)	Caps	Club
1	GK	Leong Chon Kit			
22	GK	Fong Chi Hang			
3	DF	Kong Cheng Hou			
5	DF	Lao Pak Kin			
6	DF	Geofredo Cheung			
14	DF	Kwok Siu Tin			
19	DF	Ho Wai Tong			
2	MF	Loi Wai Hong			
4	MF	Chan Man Hei			
7	MF	Cheang Cheng Ieong			
8	MF	Che Chi Man			
10	MF	Herculano Monteiro Soares			
12	MF	Ho Man Hou			
15	MF	Lam Ka Chon			
16	MF	Vernon Wong	19 November 1989 (age 35)	11	(Macau) G.D. Lam Pak
9	FW	Chong In Leong			
11	FW	Leong Ka Hang			
13	FW	Nicholas Torrão			

== Results ==
11 June 2011
15:00 GMT+8

Hong Kong	0 – 1	Macau
	(Report)	Nicholas Torrão 40'

Siu Sai Wan Sports Ground, Hong Kong
Attendance: 267
