= 2012 AFC Challenge Cup qualification =

Section of a football tournament

The 2012 AFC Challenge Cup qualification phase saw eight teams advance to the final tournament in Nepal. The qualification draw was held on 20 October 2010, in AFC House in Kuala Lumpur, Malaysia.

== Seeding ==
The seedings are based on the 2010 AFC Challenge Cup. Unlike previous editions with the exception of the inaugural edition, no team has been given direct entry into the 2012 AFC Challenge Cup. Defending champions Korea DPR, runners-up Turkmenistan and third-placed Tajikistan would now have to go through the qualifiers to enter the finals. The eight lowest ranked teams would take part in the playoff round while the remaining 12 teams would enter the Group Stage.

Group Stage Entrants	Playoff Entrants (8 lowest ranked)	Non entrants (Teams eligible to enter, but didn't)
Bangladesh; North Korea; India; Kyrgyzstan; Maldives; Myanmar; Nepal; Pakistan; Palestine; Sri Lanka; Tajikistan; Turkmenistan	Afghanistan; Bhutan; Cambodia; Chinese Taipei; Laos; Macau; Mongolia; Philippines	Brunei (suspended at time of the draw); Guam; Timor-Leste

== Qualifying play-off round ==
For the pre-qualifying phase, the eight lowest ranked teams played off over two legs on a home-and-away basis with the away goals rule, extra time and penalty shootouts to determine winners if necessary. The matches took place on 9 and 16 February 2011 with the four winners advancing to the group stage. However, for Afghanistan–Bhutan fixtures, they were rescheduled for 23 and 25 March and were played in at the Tau Devi Lal Stadium in Gurgaon, India.

The second leg of the Philippines–Mongolia fixture was originally due to take place on 16 February 2011. However, in early January 2011, Philippine Football Federation president Mariano Araneta said he wanted the match to take place at the same venue as the first leg on 12 February, citing the winter conditions in Mongolia. Mongolian Football Federation president Ganbold Buyannemekh insisted that the second leg be played in Mongolia but proposed a 15 March date instead as a compromise.

Team 1	Agg.	Team 2	1st leg	2nd leg
Bhutan	0–5	Afghanistan	0–3	0–2
Philippines	3–2	Mongolia	2–0	1–2
Chinese Taipei	6–3	Laos	5–2	1–1
Cambodia	5–4	Macau	3–1	2–3 (aet)

=== First leg ===
23 March 2011
15:00 UTC+5:30

Bhutan	0–3	Afghanistan
	Report	Walizada 2', 36', 80'

Tau Devi Lal Stadium, Gurgaon
Attendance: 200
Referee: Chaiya Mahapab (Thailand)

9 February 2011
19:00 UTC+8

Philippines	2–0	Mongolia
Caligdong 43'; P. Younghusband 90+4'	Report

Panaad Stadium, Bacolod
Attendance: 20,000
Referee: Yu Ming-hsun (Chinese Taipei)

10 February 2011
19:00 UTC+8

Chinese Taipei	5–2	Laos
Lin Cheng-yi 10'; Chang Han 22', 56'; Chen Po-Liang 44'; Lo Chih-An 49'	Report	Thongkhen 65'; Syvilay 73'

National Stadium, Kaohsiung
Attendance: 1,000
Referee: Ng Chiu Kok (Hong Kong)

9 February 2011
15:30 UTC+7

Cambodia	3–1	Macau
El Nasa 48', 53'; Laboravy 59'	Report	Leong Ka Hang 80'

National Olympic Stadium, Phnom Penh
Attendance: 2,000
Referee: Win Cho (Myanmar)

=== Second leg ===
25 March 2011
15:00 UTC+5:30

Afghanistan	2–0	Bhutan
Nadeem 61'; Kohistani 65'	Report

Tau Devi Lal Stadium, Gurgaon
Attendance: 2,000
Referee: Hedayat Mombini (Iran)

Afghanistan win 5–0 on aggregate

15 March 2011
13:00 UTC+8

Mongolia	2–1	Philippines
Lkhümbengarav 22'; Garidmagnai 35'	Report	J. Younghusband 4'

MFF Football Centre, Ulan Bator
Attendance: 3,000
Referee: Ko Hyung-Jin (Korea Republic)

Philippines win 3–2 on aggregate

16 February 2011
18:00 UTC+7

Laos	1–1	Chinese Taipei
Vongchiengkham 82'	Report	Chen Po-Liang 65'

National Sports Complex, Vientiane
Attendance: 15,300
Referee: Mohd Nafeez Abdul Wahab (Malaysia)

Chinese Taipei win 6–3 on aggregate

16 February 2011
19:00 UTC+8

Macau	3–2 (a.e.t.)	Cambodia
Vernon 62'; Leong Ka Hang 73'; Vinício 75'	Report	Borey 45+2'; El Nasa 107'

Estádio Campo Desportivo, Macau
Attendance: 100
Referee: Hettikamkanamge Perera (Sri Lanka)

Cambodia win 5–4 on aggregate

== Qualifying group stage ==
In the group stage, the 16 teams were divided into four groups of four teams each playing a single round-robin tournament (league system). This included the 12 highest ranked automatically qualified teams and the four qualifiers from the playoff round. The original match days were 20–31 March 2011. The top two teams in each group qualified for the final tournament. On 18 February 2011, the AFC announced that the hosts for each group were: Myanmar for Group A, Malaysia for Group B, Maldives for Group C, and Nepal for Group D; with match dates on 21, 23 and 25 March 2011.

However, for Group D, the All Nepal Football Association proposed the hosting rights since the end of December 2010, which the AFC had endorsed. The fixtures were also scheduled to take place from 21 to 25 March but on 7 February 2011 it was announced that the qualifiers had to be postponed due to the unavailability of the main stadium (Dasarath Rangasala Stadium) due to a wrestling event. The fixtures were then set to 7 to 11 April 2011.

The teams were ranked according to points (3 points for a win, 1 point for a tie, 0 points for a loss) and tie breakers are in following order:

1. Greater number of points obtained in the group matches between the teams concerned;
2. Goal difference resulting from the group matches between the teams concerned;
3. Greater number of goals scored in the group matches between the teams concerned;
4. Goal difference in all the group matches;
5. Greater number of goals scored in all the group matches;
6. Kicks from the penalty mark if only two teams are involved and they are both on the field of play;
7. Fewer score calculated according to the number of yellow and red cards received in the group matches; (1 point for each yellow card, 3 points for each red card as a consequence of two yellow cards, 3 points for each direct red card, 4 points for each yellow card followed by a direct red card)
8. Drawing of lots.

Key to colours in group tables
Group winners and runners-up qualify for the final tournament

=== Group A ===
- Times are Myanmar Time (MMT) – UTC+6:30

Team	Pld	W	D	L	GF	GA	GD	Pts
Palestine	3	2	1	0	5	1	+4	7
Philippines	3	1	2	0	4	1	+3	5
Bangladesh	3	1	0	2	2	5	−3	3
Myanmar	3	0	1	2	2	6	−4	1

Source: RSSSF
21 March 2011
15:30

Myanmar	1–1	Philippines
Khin Maung Lwin 90+3'	Report	J. Younghusband 76' (pen.)

Youth Training Centre, Yangon
Attendance: 5,000
Referee: Kim Jong-Hyeok (Korea Republic)
21 March 2011
18:00

Palestine	2–0	Bangladesh
Alyan 46', 65'	Report

Youth Training Centre, Yangon
Attendance: 1,000
Referee: Jameel Abdulhusain Mohamed (Bahrain)

23 March 2011
15:30

Philippines	0–0	Palestine
	Report

Youth Training Centre, Yangon
Attendance: 500
Referee: Ali Sabah Adday Al-Qaysi (Iraq)
23 March 2011
18:00

Bangladesh	2–0	Myanmar
Shakil 10'; Komol 88'	Report

Youth Training Centre, Yangon
Attendance: 3,000
Referee: Apisit Aonrak (Thailand)

25 March 2011
15:30

Myanmar	1–3	Palestine
Zaw Htet Aung 25' (pen.)	Report	Alyan 39', 90'; Harbi 71'

Youth Training Centre, Yangon
Attendance: 1,500
Referee: Jameel Abdulhusain Mohamed (Bahrain)
25 March 2011
15:30

Bangladesh	0–3	Philippines
	Report	Araneta 41'; Guirado 55', 80'

Aung San Stadium, Yangon
Attendance: 200
Referee: Kim Jong-Hyeok (Korea Republic)

=== Group B ===
- Times are Malaysia Standard Time (MST) – UTC+8

Team	Pld	W	D	L	GF	GA	GD	Pts
India	3	2	1	0	7	2	+5	7
Turkmenistan	3	2	1	0	6	1	+5	7
Pakistan	3	1	0	2	3	6	−3	3
Chinese Taipei	3	0	0	3	0	7	−7	0

Source: RSSSF
21 March 2011
16:00

Turkmenistan	3–0	Pakistan
Urazow 6'; Amanow 46'; Garadanow 86'	Report

MBPJ Stadium, Petaling Jaya
Attendance: 150
Referee: Akbar Bakhshi Zadeh (Iran)
21 March 2011
19:30

India	3–0	Chinese Taipei
Lalpekhlua 32'; Chhetri 76'; Jewel 88'	Report

MBPJ Stadium, Petaling Jaya
Attendance: 50
Referee: Mohd Nafeez Abdul Wahab (Malaysia)

23 March 2011
16:00

Pakistan	1–3	India
Mehmood 32'	Report	Lalpekhlua 67', 90+4'; Dias 90'

MBPJ Stadium, Petaling Jaya
Attendance: 100
Referee: Mohammad Al Rashidat (Jordan)
23 March 2011
19:30

Chinese Taipei	0–2	Turkmenistan
	Report	Şamyradow 73'; Hangeldiýew 76'

MBPJ Stadium, Petaling Jaya
Attendance: 100
Referee: Viktor Serazitdinov (Uzbekistan)

25 March 2011
16:00

Turkmenistan	1–1	India
Çoňkaýew 52' (pen.)	Report	Lalpekhlua 60'

MBPJ Stadium, Petaling Jaya
Attendance: 200
Referee: Mohd Nafeez Abdul Wahab (Malaysia)
25 March 2011
19:30

Chinese Taipei	0–2	Pakistan
	Report	Mehmood 26'; Bashir 67'

MBPJ Stadium, Petaling Jaya
Attendance: 50
Referee: Mohammad Al Rshaidat (Jordan)

=== Group C ===
- Times are Maldives Time (MVT) – UTC+5

Team	Pld	W	D	L	GF	GA	GD	Pts
Maldives	3	2	1	0	6	1	+5	7
Tajikistan	3	2	1	0	4	0	+4	7
Kyrgyzstan	3	1	0	2	5	6	−1	3
Cambodia	3	0	0	3	3	11	−8	0

Source: RSSSF
21 March 2011
16:00

Tajikistan	1–0	Kyrgyzstan
R. Sydykov 88' (o.g.)	Report

National Stadium, Malé
Attendance: 4,000
Referee: Mohammed Mohamed (UAE)
21 March 2011
21:00

Maldives	4–0	Cambodia
Naseer 2'; Ashfaq 41', 84', 88'	Report

National Stadium, Malé
Attendance: 8,000
Referee: Zhao Liang (China PR)

23 March 2011
16:00

Kyrgyzstan	1–2	Maldives
Abdul Ghani 87' (o.g.)	Report	Ali 5'; Qasim 79'

National Stadium, Malé
Attendance: 9,000
Referee: Marai Al Awaji (Saudi Arabia)
23 March 2011
21:00

Cambodia	0–3	Tajikistan
	Report	Davronov 2'; Ergashev 83'; Rabimov 89'

National Stadium, Malé
Attendance: 550
Referee: Pratap Singh (India)

25 March 2011
16:00

Tajikistan	0–0	Maldives
	Report

National Stadium, Malé
Attendance: 9,000
Referee: Mohammed Mohamed (UAE)
25 March 2011
21:00

Cambodia	3–4	Kyrgyzstan
Sokumpheak 39', 49'; Rithy 89'	Report	A. Sydykov 5'; Usanov 45+1'; Esenkul Uulu 80', 85'

National Stadium, Malé
Attendance: 1,000
Referee: Zhao Liang (China PR)

=== Group D ===
- Times are Nepal Time (NPT) – UTC+5:45

Team	Pld	W	D	L	GF	GA	GD	Pts
North Korea	3	3	0	0	7	0	+7	9
Nepal	3	1	1	1	1	1	0	4
Afghanistan	3	1	0	2	1	3	−2	3
Sri Lanka	3	0	1	2	0	5	−5	1

Source: RSSSF
7 April 2011
15:30

North Korea	4–0	Sri Lanka
Choe Kum-Chol 2', 47'; Ri Chol-Myong 5'; Pak Nam-Chol 21'	Report

Halchowk Stadium, Kathmandu
Attendance: 2,000
Referee: Yousef Al-Marzouq (Kuwait)
7 April 2011
15:30

Afghanistan	0–1	Nepal
	Report	Khawas 27'

Dasarath Stadium, Kathmandu
Attendance: 9,100
Referee: Yaqoob Abdul Baki (Oman)

9 April 2011
15:30

Nepal	0–1	North Korea
	Report	Jong Il-Gwan 31'

Dasarath Stadium, Kathmandu
Attendance: 22,000
Referee: Salah Abbas Alabbasi (Bahrain)
9 April 2011
15:30

Sri Lanka	0–1	Afghanistan
	Report	Hadid 82'

Halchowk Stadium, Kathmandu
Attendance: 1,800
Referee: Ali Sabah Adday Al-Qaysi (Iraq)

11 April 2011
15:30

Nepal	0–0	Sri Lanka
	Report

Dasarath Stadium, Kathmandu
Attendance: 13,500
Referee: Ali Sabah Adday Al-Qaysi (Iraq)
11 April 2011
15:30

North Korea	2–0	Afghanistan
Choe Kum-Chol 45+1'; Ri Chol-Myong 68'	Report

Halchowk Stadium, Kathmandu
Attendance: 1,000
Referee: Yaqoob Abdul Baki (Oman)

== Qualifiers ==
The following eight teams qualified for the 2012 AFC Challenge Cup held from 8 to 19 March 2012 in Nepal:

- Palestine – Group A winners
- Philippines – Group A runners-up
- India – Group B winners
- Turkmenistan – Group B runners-up
- Maldives – Group C winners
- Tajikistan – Group C runners-up
- North Korea – Group D winners
- Nepal – Group D runners-up

== Goalscorers ==
4 goals

- (India) Jeje Lalpekhlua
- (Palestine) Murad Alyan

3 goals

- (Afghanistan) Sidiq Walizada
- (Cambodia) Sam El Nasa
- (Maldives) Ali Ashfaq
- (North Korea) Choe Kum-Chol

2 goals

- (Cambodia) Kouch Sokumpheak
- (Chinese Taipei) Chang Han
- (Chinese Taipei) Chen Po-liang
- (Kyrgyzstan) Cholponbek Esenkul Uulu
- (Macau) Leong Ka Hang
- (North Korea) Ri Chol-Myong
- (Pakistan) Arif Mehmood
- (Philippines) Ángel Guirado
- (Philippines) James Younghusband

1 goal

- (Afghanistan) Mustafa Hadid
- (Afghanistan) Israfeel Kohistani
- (Afghanistan) Waheed Nadeem
- (Bangladesh) Shakil Ahmed
- (Bangladesh) Abdul Baten Komol
- (Cambodia) Khim Borey
- (Cambodia) Khoun Laboravy
- (Cambodia) Sok Rithy
- (Chinese Taipei) Lin Cheng-yi
- (Chinese Taipei) Lo Chih-an
- (India) Sunil Chhetri
- (India) Steven Dias
- (India) Jewel Raja Shaikh
- (Kyrgyzstan) Aziz Sydykov
- (Kyrgyzstan) Rustem Usanov
- (Laos) Phattana Syvilay
- (Laos) Kitsada Tongkhen
- (Laos) Soukaphone Vongchiengkham
- (Macau) Vernon
- (Macau) Vinício
- (Maldives) Ashad Ali
- (Maldives) Mukhthar Naseer
- (Maldives) Shamweel Qasim
- (Mongolia) Bayasgalangiin Garidmagnai
- (Mongolia) Donorovyn Lkhümbengarav
- (Myanmar) Khin Maung Lwin
- (Myanmar) Zaw Htat Aung
- (Nepal) Bharat Khawas
- (North Korea) Jong Il-Gwan
- (North Korea) Pak Nam-Chol
- (Pakistan) Atif Bashir
- (Palestine) Ahmed Harbi
- (Philippines) Ian Araneta
- (Philippines) Emelio Caligdong
- (Philippines) Phil Younghusband
- (Tajikistan) Nuriddin Davronov
- (Tajikistan) Davronjon Ergashev
- (Tajikistan) Ibrahim Rabimov
- (Turkmenistan) Arslanmyrat Amanow
- (Turkmenistan) Gahrymanberdi Çoňkaýew
- (Turkmenistan) Mämmedaly Garadanow
- (Turkmenistan) Guwanç Hangeldiýew
- (Turkmenistan) Berdi Şamyradow
- (Turkmenistan) Didargylyç Urazow

Own goal

- (Kyrgyzstan) Ruslan Sydykov (playing against Tajikistan)
- (Maldives) Assad Abdul Ghani (playing against Kyrgyzstan)
