= 2002–03 AFC Champions League =

22nd edition of premier club football tournament organized by the AFC

Tournament details
- Dates: 13 August – 27 November 2002 (qualifying rounds); 9 March – 11 October 2003 (group & final stages)
- Teams: 16 (group stage)

Final positions
- Champions: (United Arab Emirates) Al-Ain (1st title)
- Runners-up: (Thailand) BEC Tero Sasana

Tournament statistics
- Matches played: 30
- Goals scored: 104 (3.47 per match)
- Top scorer(s): Hao Haidong (9 goals)
- Best player: Therdsak Chaiman

The 2002–03 AFC Champions League was the twenty-second edition of Asia's premier football competition organised by the Asian Football Confederation, and the first edition under the AFC Champions League title.

Sixteen teams competed in this edition as they went through qualifying before going into four groups of four with only the winner of the group qualifying to the knockout-stage which went to two-legs instead of the single leg that the previous year competition had.

== Teams ==
Entry Round	Teams			
Group Stage	West Asia		East Asia	
Group Stage	(Iran) Persepolis (1st)	(Iraq) Al-Talaba (1st)	(China) Dalian Shide (1st)	(Japan) Kashima Antlers (1st)
Group Stage	(Saudi Arabia) Al Hilal (1st)	(United Arab Emirates) Al Ain (1st)	(South Korea) Seongnam Ilhwa Chunma (1st)	(Thailand) BEC Tero Sasana (1st)
Third qualifying round	(Iran) Esteghlal (2nd, CW)	(Iraq) Al-Zawraa	(China) Shanghai Shenhua (2nd)	(Japan) Shimizu S-Pulse (CW)
Third qualifying round	(Saudi Arabia) Al-Ahli (CW)	(Kuwait) Al-Arabi (1st)	(South Korea) Daejeon Citizen (CW)	(Thailand) Osotsapa (2nd)
Third qualifying round	(Qatar) Al-Ittihad (1st)	(Tajikistan) Regar-TadAZ (1st)	(Vietnam) Saigon Port (1st)	(Hong Kong) South China (CW)
Third qualifying round	(Turkmenistan) Nisa Aşgabat (1st)	(Uzbekistan) FK Neftchy Farg'ona (1st)	(Maldives) Club Valencia (1st)	(Singapore) Geylang United (1st)
Second qualifying round	(United Arab Emirates) Al Ahli (CW)	(Qatar) Al Sadd (CW)	(Brunei) DPMM (1st)	(India) Mohun Bagan (1st)
Second qualifying round	(Tajikistan) Khujand (CR)	(Uzbekistan) Pakhtakor (CW)	(India) Churchill Brothers (2nd)	(Indonesia) Petrokimia Putra (1st)
Second qualifying round	(Yemen) Al-Ahli (2nd)	(Jordan) Al-Faisaly (1st)	(Indonesia) Persita Tangerang (2nd)	(Macau) Monte Carlo (1st)
Second qualifying round	(Palestine) Al-Quds	(Syria) Al-Jaish (1st)	(Maldives) New Radiant (CW)	(Singapore) Home United (CW)
Second qualifying round			(Sri Lanka) Saunders SC (1st)	(Sri Lanka) Air Force
First qualifying round	(Bahrain) Busaiteen (2nd)	(Bahrain) Riffa (CW)		
First qualifying round	(Jordan) Al-Wehdat (2nd)	(Kyrgyzstan) Zhashtyk (2nd)		
First qualifying round	Al Kuwait (CW)	(Lebanon) Al-Nejmeh (1st)		
First qualifying round	(Lebanon) Al Ansar (CW)	(Oman) Al Nasr (CW)		
First qualifying round	(Palestine) Al Aqsa	(Syria) Al-Ittihad (2nd)		
First qualifying round	(Turkmenistan) Köpetdag Aşgabat (CW)			

== Qualification Round ==
=== First qualifying round ===
Team 1	Agg.	Team 2	1st leg	2nd leg
West Region
Al-Wehdat (Jordan)	3–2	(Lebanon) Al Nejmeh	3–2	0–0
Al Ansar (Lebanon)	w/o (Note: Al-Nasr withdrew. Al-Ansar had also announced their withdrawal "due to financial and logistic difficulties", but their opponents beat them to it.)	(Oman) Al Nasr	—	—
Al Aqsa (Palestine)	w/o (Note: Al Aqsa withdrew due to the Israel-Palestine conflict.)	(Kyrgyzstan) Zhashtyk	—	—
Busaiteen (Bahrain)	Bye	N/A	—	—
Al Kuwait	Bye	N/A	—	—
Köpetdag Aşgabat (Turkmenistan)	Bye	N/A	—	—
Riffa (Bahrain)	Bye	N/A	—	—
Al Ittihad (Syria)	Bye	N/A	—	—

=== Second qualifying round ===
Team 1	Agg.	Team 2	1st leg	2nd leg
West Region
Al-Ansar (Lebanon)	1–3	(Jordan) Al Faisaly	1–0	0–3
Pakhtakor (Uzbekistan)	4–3	(Jordan) Al-Wehdat	3–0	1–3
Al Ahli (United Arab Emirates)	3–3 (a)	Al Kuwait	2–0	1–3
Zhashtyk (Kyrgyzstan)	0–4	(Yemen) Al-Ahli (San'a')	0–2	0–2
Köpetdag Aşgabat (Turkmenistan)	w/o (Note: Köpetdag Aşgabat withdrew due to financial issues.)	(Qatar) Al Sadd	—	—
Busaiteen (Bahrain)	w/o (Note: The AFC rejected the entries of Busaiteen and Riffa as neither team met the AFC's required criteria.)	(Syria) Al-Jaish	—	—
Al-Quds (Palestine)	w/o	(Bahrain) Riffa	—	—
Al-Ittihad (Syria)	w/o (Note: Khujand was disqualified following the suspension of the Tajikistan Football Federation by FIFA and the AFC.)	(Tajikistan) Khujand	—	—
East Region
Saunders SC (Sri Lanka)	1–7	(India) Mohun Bagan	0–2	1–5
Air Force (Sri Lanka)	2–3	(Maldives) New Radiant	1–1	1–2 (a.e.t.)
Monte Carlo (Macau)	Bye	N/A	—	—
DPMM (Brunei)	Bye	N/A	—	—
Persita Tangerang (Indonesia)	Bye	N/A	—	—
Petrokimia Putra (Indonesia)	Bye	N/A	—	—
Churchill Brothers (India)	Bye	N/A	—	—
Home United (Singapore)	Bye	N/A	—	—

=== Third qualifying round ===
Team 1	Agg.	Team 2	1st leg	2nd leg
West Region
Al Ittihad (Syria)	1–5	(Kuwait) Al Arabi	1–1	0–4
Al Sadd (Qatar)	3–2	(Iraq) Al Zawraa	1–1	2–1 (a.e.t.)
Esteghlal (Iran)	3–0	(Jordan) Al Faisaly	2–0	1–0
Al Ahli (United Arab Emirates)	5–4	(Saudi Arabia) Al-Ahli	3–2	2–2
Al-Ahli (San'a') (Yemen)	1–8	(Uzbekistan) FK Neftchy Farg'ona	1–2	0–6
Al-Ittihad (Qatar)	4–6	(Uzbekistan) Pakhtakor	4–3	0–3
Al-Jaish (Syria)	w/o (Note: Regar-TadAZ was disqualified following the suspension of the Tajikistan Football Federation by FIFA and the AFC.)	(Tajikistan) Regar-TadAZ	—	—
Al-Quds (Palestine)	w/o (Note: Al-Quds withdrew due to the Israel-Palestine conflict.)	(Turkmenistan) Nisa Aşgabat	—	—
East Region
Geylang United FC (Singapore)	7–0	(Brunei) DPMM	3–0	4–0
Petrokimia Putra (Indonesia)	4–6	(China) Shanghai Shenhua	3–1	1–5
South China (Hong Kong)	3–2	(Singapore) Home United FC	2–1	1–1
Persita Tangerang (Indonesia)	0–1	(Thailand) Osotsapa FC	0–1	0–0
Monte Carlo (Macau)	1–8	(South Korea) Daejeon Citizen	1–5	0–3
Shimizu S-Pulse (Japan)	7–0	(Maldives) New Radiant	7–0	0–0
Mohun Bagan (India)	5–2	(Maldives) Club Valencia	2–2	3–0
Churchill Brothers (India)	2–1	(Vietnam) Saigon Port	2–0	0–1

=== Fourth qualifying round ===
Team 1	Agg.	Team 2	1st leg	2nd leg
West Region
Al-Jaish (Syria)	2–2 (1–4 p)	(Qatar) Al Sadd	1–1	1–1
Nisa Asgabat (Turkmenistan)	w/o (Note: Al Arabi withdrew.)	(Kuwait) Al Arabi	—	—
Pakhtakor (Uzbekistan)	4–2	(United Arab Emirates) Al Ahli	3–2	1–0
Esteghlal (Iran)	2–2 (a)	(Uzbekistan) FK Neftchy Farg'ona	1–0	1–2
East Region
Churchill Brothers (India)	4–7	(Thailand) Osotsapa FC	1–1	3–6
South China (Hong Kong)	1–8	(Japan) Shimizu S-Pulse	0–5	1–3
Shanghai Shenhua (China)	5–1	(Singapore) Geylang United FC	3–0	2–1
Daejeon Citizen (South Korea)	8–1	(India) Mohun Bagan	6–0	2–1

== Group stage ==
Location of the 2002–03 AFC Champions League group stage teams
Brown: Group A; Cyan: Group B; Orange: Group C; Yellow: Group D;

=== Group A ===
Pos	Team	Pld	W	D	L	GF	GA	GD	Pts	Qualification
1	(Thailand) BEC Tero Sasana (H)	3	2	1	0	6	3	+3	7	Advance to Knockout stage
2	(South Korea) Daejeon Citizen	3	2	0	1	3	3	0	6	
3	(China) Shanghai Shenhua	3	1	0	2	6	7	−1	3	
4	(Japan) Kashima Antlers	3	0	1	2	5	7	−2	1	

(H) Hosts
10 March 2003

Shanghai Shenhua (China)	1–2	(South Korea) Daejeon Citizen
Luo Xiao 85'	(Report)	Han Jung-kook 8'; Kim Eun-jung 44'

Suphachalasai Stadium, Bangkok
Attendance: 8,000
Referee: Masoud Moradi
10 March 2003

Kashima Antlers (Japan)	2–2	(Thailand) BEC Tero Sasana
Hirase 21'; Fernando 77'	(Report)	Yongant 76', 90'

Suphachalasai Stadium, Bangkok
Attendance: 10,000
Referee: Al Hamdan Naser

12 March 2003

Kashima Antlers (Japan)	3–4	(China) Shanghai Shenhua
Aoki 24'; Fernando 56'; Nozawa 90'	(Report)	Yang Guang 1'; Zhang Yuning 11'; Martínez 31', 87'

Suphachalasai Stadium, Bangkok
Attendance: 6,000
Referee: Balu Sundarraj
12 March 2003

Daejeon Citizen (South Korea)	0–2	(Thailand) BEC Tero Sasana
	(Report)	Kongpraphan 14'; Chaiman 73'

Suphachalasai Stadium, Bangkok
Attendance: 16,000
Referee: Anura De Silva

14 March 2003

BEC Tero Sasana (Thailand)	2–1	(China) Shanghai Shenhua
Thongsukh 27'; Chaiman 85'	(Report)	Martínez 58'

Suphachalasai Stadium, Bangkok
Attendance: 20,000
Referee: Al Hamdan Naser
14 March 2003

Daejeon Citizen (South Korea)	1–0	(Japan) Kashima Antlers
Papa Oumar 87'	(Report)

Suphachalasai Stadium, Bangkok
Attendance: 10,000
Referee: Masoud Moradi

=== Group B ===
Pos	Team	Pld	W	D	L	GF	GA	GD	Pts	Qualification
1	(China) Dalian Shide (H)	3	2	1	0	10	2	+8	7	Advance to Knockout stage
2	(South Korea) Seongnam Ilhwa Chunma	3	2	0	1	9	4	+5	6	
3	(Japan) Shimizu S-Pulse	3	1	1	1	8	2	+6	4	
4	(Thailand) Osotsapa FC	3	0	0	3	1	20	−19	0	

(H) Hosts
9 March 2003

Seongnam Ilhwa Chunma (South Korea)	6–0	(Thailand) Osotsapa FC
Park Nam-yeol 22'; Kim Dae-eui 31'; Kim Do-hoon 37', 61', 83'; Drakulić 53'	(Report)

People's Stadium, Dalian
Attendance: 20,000
Referee: Ravshan Irmatov
9 March 2003

Shimizu S-Pulse (Japan)	0–0	(China) Dalian Shide
	(Report)

People's Stadium, Dalian
Attendance: 30,000
Referee: Kim Jong-sik

12 March 2003

Shimizu S-Pulse (Japan)	1–2	(South Korea) Seongnam Ilhwa Chunma
Ahn Jung-hwan 53'	(Report)	Drakulić 74'; Kim Dae-eui 87'

People's Stadium, Dalian
Attendance: 2,000
Referee: Ahmad Khalidi Supain
12 March 2003

Osotsapa FC (Thailand)	1–7	(China) Dalian Shide
Jankam 13'	(Report)	Hao Haidong 27', 32', 49', 61'; Yan Song 60'; Zou Jie 80'; Dong Fangzhuo 82'

People's Stadium, Dalian
Attendance: 18,000
Referee: Setiyono Midi Nitrerejo

15 March 2003

Dalian Shide (China)	3–1	(South Korea) Seongnam Ilhwa Chunma
Hao Haidong 57', 64'; Yan Song 90'	(Report)	Kim Dae-eui 51'

People's Stadium, Dalian
Attendance: 30,000
Referee: Ravshan Irmatov
15 March 2003

Osotsapa FC (Thailand)	0–7	(Japan) Shimizu S-Pulse
	(Report)	Takagi 23', 40'; Sawanobori 27'; Alex 50'; Ahn Jung-hwan 60', 71'; Kitajima 75'

People's Stadium, Dalian
Attendance: 5,000
Referee: Setiyono Midi Nitrerejo

=== Group C ===
Pos	Team	Pld	W	D	L	GF	GA	GD	Pts	Qualification
1	(United Arab Emirates) Al-Ain (H)	3	3	0	0	6	1	+5	9	Advance to Knockout stage
2	(Qatar) Al Sadd	3	1	0	2	4	5	−1	3	
3	(Iran) Esteghlal	3	1	0	2	5	7	−2	3	
4	(Saudi Arabia) Al-Hilal	3	1	0	2	4	6	−2	3	

(H) Hosts
9 March 2003

Al Sadd (Qatar)	1–2	(Iran) Esteghlal
Sergio Ricardo 72'	(Report)	Samereh 6'; Khatibi 64'

Tahnoun Bin Mohamed Stadium, Al Ain
Attendance: 4,500
Referee: Toru Kamikawa
9 March 2003

Al-Ain (United Arab Emirates)	1–0	(Saudi Arabia) Al-Hilal
Harib 12' (pen.)	(Report)

Tahnoun Bin Mohamed Stadium, Al Ain
Attendance: 6,500
Referee: Shaban Qassem

12 March 2003

Al-Ain (United Arab Emirates)	2–0	(Qatar) Al Sadd
Traoré 24'; Sanogo 89'	(Report)

Tahnoun Bin Mohamed Stadium, Al Ain
Attendance: 9,000
Referee: Lu Jun
12 March 2003

Esteghlal (Iran)	2–3	(Saudi Arabia) Al-Hilal
Khatibi 18'; Samereh 42'	(Report)	Suffo 34' 74' 85'

Tahnoun Bin Mohamed Stadium, Al Ain
Attendance: 2,500
Referee: Subkhdiin Mohd Salleh

15 March 2003

Al-Hilal (Saudi Arabia)	1–3	(Qatar) Al Sadd
Jumaan 57'	(Report)	Keita 45'; Sergio Ricardo 80'; Kamil 90'

Tahnoun Bin Mohamed Stadium, Al Ain
Attendance: 1,200
Referee: Shaban Qassem
15 March 2003

Esteghlal (Iran)	1–3	(United Arab Emirates) Al-Ain
Samereh 67'	(Report)	Faisal Ali 65'; Sanogo 76'; Harib 78'

Tahnoun Bin Mohamed Stadium, Al Ain
Attendance: 15,000
Referee: Lu Jun

=== Group D ===
Pos	Team	Pld	W	D	L	GF	GA	GD	Pts	Qualification
1	(Uzbekistan) Pakhtakor (H)	3	3	0	0	7	0	+7	9	Advance to Knockout stage
2	(Iran) Persepolis	3	2	0	1	5	2	+3	6	
3	(Iraq) Al-Talaba	3	1	0	2	3	4	−1	3	
4	(Turkmenistan) Nisa Asgabat	3	0	0	3	1	10	−9	0	

(H) Hosts
9 March 2003

Nisa Asgabat (Turkmenistan)	0–3	(Uzbekistan) Pakhtakor
	(Report)	Hamidullaev 44'; Soliev 57'; Koshelev 72'

Pakhtakor Stadium, Tashkent
Attendance: 30,000
Referee: Rungklay Mongkol
9 March 2003

Al-Talaba (Iraq)	0–1	(Iran) Persepolis
	(Report)	Golmohammadi 62'

Pakhtakor Stadium, Tashkent
Attendance: 5,000
Referee: Masayoshi Okada

11 March 2003

Al-Talaba (Iraq)	3–0	(Turkmenistan) Nisa Asgabat
Abdulsada 10'; Mahmoud 24', 90'	(Report)

Pakhtakor Stadium, Tashkent
Attendance: 3,000
Referee: Bae Jae-yong
11 March 2003

Pakhtakor (Uzbekistan)	1–0	(Iran) Persepolis
Soliev 22'	(Report)

Pakhtakor Stadium, Tashkent
Attendance: 45,000
Referee: Masayoshi Okada

13 March 2003

Persepolis (Iran)	4–1	(Turkmenistan) Nisa Asgabat
Khanmohammadi 14', 76'; Golmohammadi 47'; Aslanian 90'	(Report)	Meredov 89' (pen.)

Pakhtakor Stadium, Tashkent
Attendance: 2,000
Referee: Fareed Al Marzouqi
13 March 2003

Pakhtakor (Uzbekistan)	3–0	(Iraq) Al-Talaba
Krokhmal 25', 57'; Goçgulyýew 37'	(Report)

Pakhtakor Stadium, Tashkent
Attendance: 55,000
Referee: Rungklay Mongkol

== Knockout stage ==
=== Bracket ===
Semi-finals
(United Arab Emirates) Al-Ain	4	3	7
(China) Dalian Shide	2	4	6
(Thailand) BEC Tero Sasana	3	0	3
(Uzbekistan) Pakhtakor	1	1	2

Final
(United Arab Emirates) Al-Ain	2	0	2
(Thailand) BEC Tero Sasana	0	1	1

=== Semi-finals ===
Team 1	Agg.	Team 2	1st leg	2nd leg
BEC Tero Sasana (Thailand)	3–2	(Uzbekistan) Pakhtakor	3–1	0–1
Al-Ain (United Arab Emirates)	7–6	(China) Dalian Shide	4–2	3–4

==== Matches ====
9 April 2003

BEC Tero Sasana (Thailand)	3–1	(Uzbekistan) Pakhtakor
Srimaka 41'; Fuangprakob 69'; Chaiman 84'	(Report)	Soliev 80'

Suphachalasai Stadium, Bangkok
Attendance: 15,000
Referee: Kwon Jong-chul
22 April 2003

Pakhtakor (Uzbekistan)	1–0	(Thailand) BEC Tero Sasana
Djeperov 86'	(Report)

Pakhtakor Stadium, Tashkent
Attendance: 50,000
Referee: Toru Kamikawa

BEC Tero Sasana won 3–2 on aggregate.

9 April 2003

Al-Ain (United Arab Emirates)	4–2	(China) Dalian Shide
Sanogo 62' (pen.), 83'; Omar 64'; Yaslam 75'	(Report)	Hao Haidong 17'; Li Yao 88'

Tahnoun Bin Mohamed Stadium, Al Ain
Attendance: 20,000
Referee: Abdul Rahman
30 August 2003 (Note: The Dailan Shide v Al-Ain match, originally scheduled to be played on 23 April 2003, was postponed due to SARS outbreak in China.)

Dalian Shide (China)	4–3	(United Arab Emirates) Al-Ain
Wang Peng 27'; Janković 77'; Hao Haidong 81', 84'	(Report)	Rodrigo Fabiano 46'; Omar 65'; Majidi 87'

People's Stadium, Dalian
Attendance: 46,000
Referee: Masayoshi Okada

Al-Ain won 7–6 on aggregate.

=== Final ===
Team 1	Agg.	Team 2	1st leg	2nd leg
Al-Ain (United Arab Emirates)	2–1	(Thailand) BEC Tero Sasana	2–0	0–1

==== Matches ====
3 October 2003

Al-Ain (United Arab Emirates)	2–0	(Thailand) BEC Tero Sasana
Jowhar 38'; Omar 74'

Tahnoun Bin Mohamed Stadium, Al Ain
11 October 2003

BEC Tero Sasana (Thailand)	1–0	(United Arab Emirates) Al-Ain
Chaiman 60' (pen.)

Rajamangala Stadium, Bangkok

Al-Ain won 2–1 on aggregate.

== Top scorers ==
Rank	Player	Team	Goals
1	(China) Hao Haidong	(China) Dalian Shide	9
2	(Ivory Coast) Boubacar Sanogo	(United Arab Emirates) Al Ain	4
2	(Thailand) Therdsak Chaiman	(Thailand) BEC Tero Sasana	4
4	(Cameroon) Patrick Suffo	(Saudi Arabia) Al-Hilal	3
4	(United Arab Emirates) Mohammad Omar	(United Arab Emirates) Al Ain	3
4	(Iran) Ali Samereh	(Iran) Esteghlal	3
4	(Uzbekistan) Anvarjon Soliev	(Uzbekistan) Pakhtakor	3
4	(South Korea) Kim Dae-eui	(South Korea) Seongnam Ilhwa Chunma	3
4	(South Korea) Kim Do-hoon	(South Korea) Seongnam Ilhwa Chunma	3
4	(Honduras) Saul Martínez	(China) Shanghai Shenhua	3
4	(South Korea) Ahn Jung-hwan	(Japan) Shimizu S-Pulse	3
