= 2002–03 AFC Champions League qualification =

Following is a result of results from the 2002–03 AFC Champions League qualification rounds. The league was the 22nd edition of the top-level Asian club football tournament and the 1st edition under the current AFC Champions League title.

== First qualifying round ==
Team 1	Agg.	Team 2	1st leg	2nd leg
West Region
Al-Wehdat (Jordan)	3–2	(Lebanon) Al Nejmeh	3–2	0–0
Al Ansar (Lebanon)	w/o (Note: Al-Nasr withdrew. Al-Ansar had also announced their withdrawal "due to financial and logistic difficulties", but their opponents beat them to it.)	(Oman) Al Nasr	—	—
Al Aqsa (Palestine)	w/o (Note: Al Aqsa withdrew due to the Israel-Palestine conflict.)	(Kyrgyzstan) Zhashtyk	—	—
Busaiteen (Bahrain)	Bye	N/A	—	—
Al Kuwait	Bye	N/A	—	—
Köpetdag Aşgabat (Turkmenistan)	Bye	N/A	—	—
Riffa (Bahrain)	Bye	N/A	—	—
Al Ittihad (Syria)	Bye	N/A	—	—

== Second qualifying round ==
Team 1	Agg.	Team 2	1st leg	2nd leg
West Region
Al-Ansar (Lebanon)	1–3	(Jordan) Al Faisaly	1–0	0–3
Pakhtakor (Uzbekistan)	4–3	(Jordan) Al-Wehdat	3–0	1–3
Al Ahli (United Arab Emirates)	3–3 (a)	Al Kuwait	2–0	1–3
Zhashtyk (Kyrgyzstan)	0–4	(Yemen) Al-Ahli (San'a')	0–2	0–2
Köpetdag Aşgabat (Turkmenistan)	w/o (Note: Köpetdag Aşgabat withdrew due to financial issues.)	(Qatar) Al Sadd	—	—
Busaiteen (Bahrain)	w/o (Note: The AFC rejected the entries of Busaiteen and Riffa as neither team met the AFC's required criteria.)	(Syria) Al-Jaish	—	—
Al-Quds (Palestine)	w/o	(Bahrain) Riffa	—	—
Al-Ittihad (Syria)	w/o (Note: Khujand was disqualified following the suspension of the Tajikistan Football Federation by FIFA and the AFC.)	(Tajikistan) Khujand	—	—
East Region
Saunders SC (Sri Lanka)	1–7	(India) Mohun Bagan	0–2	1–5
Air Force (Sri Lanka)	2–3	(Maldives) New Radiant	1–1	1–2 (a.e.t.)
Monte Carlo (Macau)	Bye	N/A	—	—
DPMM (Brunei)	Bye	N/A	—	—
Persita Tangerang (Indonesia)	Bye	N/A	—	—
Petrokimia Putra (Indonesia)	Bye	N/A	—	—
Churchill Brothers (India)	Bye	N/A	—	—
Home United (Singapore)	Bye	N/A	—	—

== Third qualifying round ==
Team 1	Agg.	Team 2	1st leg	2nd leg
West Region
Al Ittihad (Syria)	1–5	(Kuwait) Al Arabi	1–1	0–4
Al Sadd (Qatar)	3–2	(Iraq) Al Zawraa	1–1	2–1 (a.e.t.)
Esteghlal (Iran)	3–0	(Jordan) Al Faisaly	2–0	1–0
Al Ahli (United Arab Emirates)	5–4	(Saudi Arabia) Al-Ahli	3–2	2–2
Al-Ahli (San'a') (Yemen)	1–8	(Uzbekistan) FK Neftchy Farg'ona	1–2	0–6
Al-Ittihad (Qatar)	4–6	(Uzbekistan) Pakhtakor	4–3	0–3
Al-Jaish (Syria)	w/o (Note: Regar-TadAZ was disqualified following the suspension of the Tajikistan Football Federation by FIFA and the AFC.)	(Tajikistan) Regar-TadAZ	—	—
Al-Quds (Palestine)	w/o (Note: Al-Quds withdrew due to the Israel-Palestine conflict.)	(Turkmenistan) Nisa Aşgabat	—	—
East Region
Geylang United FC (Singapore)	7–0	(Brunei) DPMM	3–0	4–0
Petrokimia Putra (Indonesia)	4–6	(China) Shanghai Shenhua	3–1	1–5
South China (Hong Kong)	3–2	(Singapore) Home United FC	2–1	1–1
Persita Tangerang (Indonesia)	0–1	(Thailand) Osotsapa FC	0–1	0–0
Monte Carlo (Macau)	1–8	(South Korea) Daejeon Citizen	1–5	0–3
Shimizu S-Pulse (Japan)	7–0	(Maldives) New Radiant	7–0	0–0
Mohun Bagan (India)	5–2	(Maldives) Club Valencia	2–2	3–0
Churchill Brothers (India)	2–1	(Vietnam) Saigon Port	2–0	0–1

== Fourth qualifying round ==
Team 1	Agg.	Team 2	1st leg	2nd leg
West Region
Al-Jaish (Syria)	2–2 (1–4 p)	(Qatar) Al Sadd	1–1	1–1
Nisa Asgabat (Turkmenistan)	w/o (Note: Al Arabi withdrew.)	(Kuwait) Al Arabi	—	—
Pakhtakor (Uzbekistan)	4–2	(United Arab Emirates) Al Ahli	3–2	1–0
Esteghlal (Iran)	2–2 (a)	(Uzbekistan) FK Neftchy Farg'ona	1–0	1–2
East Region
Churchill Brothers (India)	4–7	(Thailand) Osotsapa FC	1–1	3–6
South China (Hong Kong)	1–8	(Japan) Shimizu S-Pulse	0–5	1–3
Shanghai Shenhua (China)	5–1	(Singapore) Geylang United FC	3–0	2–1
Daejeon Citizen (South Korea)	8–1	(India) Mohun Bagan	6–0	2–1
