= Cheong Hoi San =

Macanese footballer

Personal information
- Date of birth: 26 June 1998 (age 28)
- Position: Midfielder

Team information
- Current team: Benfica (Macau)

Senior career*
Years	Team	Apps	(Gls)
2015	MFA Development	17	(2)
2016	Windsor Arch Ka I	0	(0)
2016–2017	MFA Development		
2017–2019	Monte Carlo	35	(6)
2020	C.P.K.	8	(0)
2021–	Benfica (Macau)	2	(0)
- Monte Carlo

International career^{‡}
2014–2015	Macau U14	4	(0)
2016–2018	Macau U19	3	(0)
2017	Macau U23	5	(0)
2015–	Macau	13	(0)
- * Club domestic league appearances and goals as of 23:53, 13 March 2022 (UTC) ‡ National team caps and goals as of 19:12, 13 March 2023 (UTC)

Cheong Hoi San (張海山 born 26 June 1998) is a Macanese international footballer who plays as a midfielder for Monte Carlo and the Macau national football team.

== International career ==
Cheong was called up to the Macau senior team in February 2015 in preparation for 2018 FIFA World Cup qualification games, but would have to wait until November of the same year for his debut, which came against Hong Kong in a 2–0 defeat. He played in a 3–1 win over the Northern Mariana Islands in 2016, coming on as a 90th-minute substitute for Chan Man.

== Career statistics ==
=== Club ===
As of 13 March 2021.

Club	Season	League			Cup		Continental		Other		Total	
Club	Season	Division	Apps	Goals	Apps	Goals	Apps	Goals	Apps	Goals	Apps	Goals
MFA Development	2015	Campeonato da 1ª Divisão do Futebol	17	2	0	0	–		0	0	17	2
Windsor Arch Ka I	2016	Campeonato da 1ª Divisão do Futebol	0	0	0	0	–		0	0	0	0
MFA Development	2017	Liga de Elite	14	2	0	0	–		0	0	14	2
Monte Carlo	2018	Liga de Elite	18	4	0	0	–		0	0	18	4
Monte Carlo	2019	Liga de Elite	17	2	0	0	–		0	0	17	2
Monte Carlo	Total		35	6	0	0	0	0	0	0	35	6
C.P.K.	2020	Liga de Elite	8	0	0	0	–		0	0	8	0
Benfica (Macau)	2021	Liga de Elite	1	0	0	0	–		0	0	1	0
Career total			75	10	0	0	0	0	0	0	75	10

=== International ===
As of 13 March 2021.

National team	Year	Apps	Goals
Macau	2015	1	0
Macau	2016	5	0
Macau	2017	1	0
Macau	2018	5	0
Macau	2019	1	0
Total		13	0
