= 2004 Campeonato da 1ª Divisão do Futebol =

1ª Divisão
- Season: 2004
- Champions: Monte Carlo
- Matches: 40

Statistics of Campeonato da 1ª Divisão do Futebol in the 2004 season.

== Overview ==
Monte Carlo won the championship.

== League standings ==
Pos	Team	Pld	W	D	L	Pts
1	Monte Carlo	10	9	0	1	27
2	Polícia de Segurança Pública	10	6	2	2	20
3	Heng Tai	10	5	3	2	18
4	Lam Pak	10	3	3	4	12
5	Vá Luen	10	3	2	5	11
6	Serviços de Alfândega	10	3	1	6	10
7	Bombeiros	10	2	2	6	8
8	Autoridade Monetária	10	2	1	7	7

Source: rsssf.com
