= 2008 Campeonato da 1ª Divisão do Futebol =

1ª Divisão
- Season: 2008
- Champions: Monte Carlo
- Matches: 56
- Goals: 202 (3.61 per match)

Statistics of Campeonato da 1ª Divisão do Futebol in the 2008 season.

== Overview ==
Monte Carlo won the championship.

== League standings ==
Pos	Team	Pld	W	D	L	GF	GA	GD	Pts
1	Monte Carlo	14	12	1	1	51	12	+39	37
2	Lam Pak	14	11	2	1	50	14	+36	35
3	Hoi Fan	14	7	3	4	20	21	−1	24
4	Vong Chiu	14	7	2	5	27	28	−1	23
5	Vá Luen	14	4	3	7	14	28	−14	15
6	Polícia de Segurança Pública	14	4	1	9	13	23	−10	13
7	Macao U-21	14	4	1	9	20	35	−15	13
8	Heng Tai	14	0	1	13	7	41	−34	1

Source: rsssf.com
