= Miguel Heitor =

Macau footballer

Personal information
- Date of birth: 24 March 1975 (age 51)
- Place of birth: Portugal
- Height: 1.73 m (5 ft 8 in)
- Position: Right winger

Senior career*
Years	Team	Apps	(Gls)
- Negro Rubro
1999–2003	Monte Carlo		
2003–2008	Kuan Tai		

International career
1993–2006	Macau	10	(0)
- * Club domestic league appearances and goals

Miguel Heitor (born 24 March 1975) is a former footballer who played as a midfielder. Born in Portugal, Cova da Piedade Almada, he was a Macau international.

== Career ==
In 2007, Heitor was appointed Director of Football Development of the Qatar Stars League.
