= Waheed Nadeem =

Afghan footballer

Personal information
- Date of birth: 7 January 1987 (age 39)
- Place of birth: Herat, Afghanistan
- Position: Central midfielder

Team information
- Current team: Toofaan Harirod F.C.
- Number: 8

Senior career*
Years	Team	Apps	(Gls)
2006–	Kabul Bank F.C.	72	(20)

International career
2003–	Afghanistan U-23	?	(?)
2009–	Afghanistan	9	(1)
Medal record
Men's football
Representing Afghanistan
SAFF Championship
Winner	2013 Nepal
- * Club domestic league appearances and goals

Waheed Nadeem (Persian: وحید ندیم; born 7 January 1987) is an Afghan footballer who plays for Toofaan Harirod F.C. and the Afghanistan national team. He has previously played for the national under-23 team. He wears number 8 for the national team and his club Toofaan Harirod F.C.

== International career ==
He debuted for Afghanistan in December 2009 in a South Asian Football Federation Championship, commonly known as the SAFF Championship, against Maldives. He scored his debut international goal in March 2011, against Bhutan.

== International goals ==
Scores and results list Afghanistan's goal tally first.

No.	Date	Venue	Opponent	Score	Result	Competition
1.	25 March 2011	Tau Devi Lal Stadium, Gurgaon, India	Bhutan	1–0	2–0	2012 AFC Challenge Cup qualification

== Honours ==
Afghanistan

- SAFF Championship: 2013
