= Vernon Wong =

Hong Kong-born Macanese footballer (born 1989)

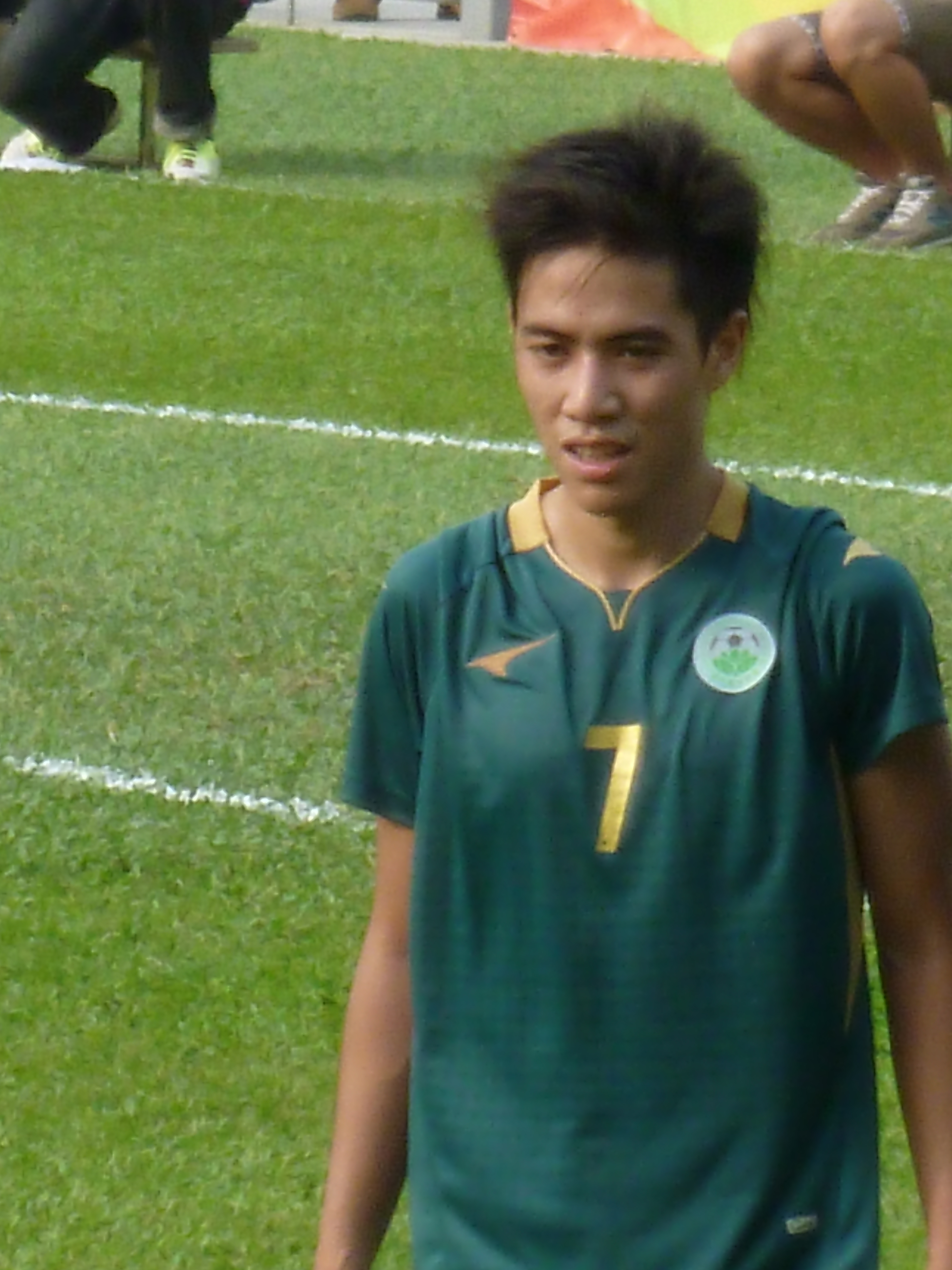
- Wong with Macau in 2013

Personal information
- Full name: Vernon Wa Lone Wong
- Date of birth: 19 November 1989 (age 36)
- Place of birth: Hong Kong
- Height: 1.74 m (5 ft 9 in)
- Position: Defender

Team information
- Current team: Kui Tan SC
- Number: 29

Senior career*
Years	Team	Apps	(Gls)
2005–2011	Macau U-23		
2011–2013	G.D. Lam Pak	36	(10)
2014	Windsor Arch Ka I	7	(1)
2015	Sporting Macau	10	(1)
2016–2018	Monte Carlo		
2019–2022	Ka I		
2023	Ornament	0	(0)
2023	Wan Guan		
2023	3 Sing		
2024	Kui Tan SC		

International career^{‡}
2009–	Macau	25	(2)
- * Club domestic league appearances and goals as of 1 September 2023 ‡ National team caps and goals as of 1 September 2023

Vernon Wa Lone Wong (黃華麟, born 19 November 1989) is a professional footballer who plays as a defender. Born in Hong Kong, he represents Macau at international level.

== International goals ==
No.	Date	Venue	Opponent	Score	Result	Competition
1.	16 February 2011	Estádio Campo Desportivo, Taipa, Macau	Cambodia	1–1	3–2 (a.e.t.)	2012 AFC Challenge Cup qualification
2.	20 July 2012	Leo Palace Resort, Yona, Guam	Northern Mariana Islands	5–1	5–1	2013 EAFF East Asian Cup
