= Tam Iao San =

Macau Football Coach

Personal information
- Date of birth: 25 October 1976 (age 50)
- Place of birth: China
- Position: Midfielder

Team information
- Current team: Monte Carlo (manager)

Senior career*
Years	Team	Apps	(Gls)
- Lam Pak
- Artilheiros
2001–2003	Monte Carlo		
2003–2005	Heng Tai		

International career
2000–2001	Macau	7	(0)

Managerial career
- 2004–2008: Monte Carlo
- 2009–2010: Macau U18
- 2013: Monte Carlo
- 2015–2017: Macau
- 2019–: Monte Carlo
Medal record
Men's football
Representing Macau (as manager)
AFC Solidarity Cup
Runner-up	2016
- * Club domestic league appearances and goals

Tam Iao San (Chinese: 譚又新; pinyin: Tán Yòuxīn; born 25 October 1976) is a football coach, currently managing Monte Carlo.

== Playing career ==
Tam moved to Macau aged seven. At club level, Tam played for Lam Pak, Artilheiros, Monte Carlo and Heng Tai.

Internationally, Tam made seven appearances for Macau.

== Managerial career ==
Following his retirement, Tam returned to former club Monte Carlo as manager. From 2015 to 2017, Tam managed Macau. Ahead of the 2019 Liga de Elite season, Tam returned as manager of Monte Carlo.
