= Choi Chan In =

Macanese footballer

Personal information
- Full name: Choi Chan In
- Date of birth: 28 August 1992 (age 34)
- Place of birth: Macau
- Height: 1.82 m (6 ft 0 in)
- Position: Defender

Team information
- Current team: Lee Man (fitness coach)

International career
Years	Team	Apps	(Gls)
2011–	Macau	16	(0)

Managerial career
- 2017–2018: Dreams FC (fitness coach)
- 2018–: Lee Man (fitness coach)

Choi Chan In (Chinese: 蔡振賢; born 28 August 1992 in Macau) is a Macanese footballer who currently works a fitness coach for Hong Kong Premier League club Lee Man. He also plays for the Macau national football team.
