= 2003 Campeonato da 1ª Divisão do Futebol =

1ª Divisão
- Season: 2003
- Champions: Monte Carlo

Statistics of Campeonato da 1ª Divisão do Futebol in the 2003 season.

== Overview ==
Monte Carlo won the championship.
