= 2002 Campeonato da 1ª Divisão do Futebol =

1ª Divisão
- Season: 2002
- Champions: Monte Carlo
- Matches: 56
- Goals: 244 (4.36 per match)

Statistics of Campeonato da 1ª Divisão do Futebol in the 2002 season.

== Overview ==
Monte Carlo won the championship.

== League standings ==
Pos	Team	Pld	W	D	L	GF	GA	GD	Pts
1	Monte Carlo	14	12	1	1	47	12	+35	37
2	Polícia de Segurança Pública	14	10	1	3	47	14	+33	31
3	Lam Pak	14	9	1	4	46	12	+34	28
4	Serviços de Alfândega	14	9	1	4	38	21	+17	28
5	Autoridade Monetária e Cambial	14	6	1	7	27	31	−4	19
6	Heng Tai	14	4	2	8	16	30	−14	14
7	Ip U	14	1	1	12	13	52	−39	4
8	Barra	14	0	2	12	10	64	−54	2

Source: rsssf.com
