= Sidiq Walizada =

Afghan footballer

Personal information
- Full name: Mohammad Sidiq Walizada
- Date of birth: 27 December 1991 (age 34)
- Place of birth: Tagab, Afghanistan
- Position: Forward

Team information
- Current team: VV Zuidland
- Number: 10

Senior career*
| Years | Team | Apps | (Gls) |
| 2009–2010 | Ordu Kabul | | |
| 2012–2013 | NBSVV | | |
| 2013–2014 | VV Nieuwenhoorn | | |
| 2014–2015 | VV Zuidland | | |
| 2015–2016 | VV SHO | | |
| 2016– | VV Zuidland | | |

International career
| 2010–2013 | Afghanistan | 10 | (3) |
Medal record
Men's football
Representing Afghanistan
SAFF Championship
| Winner | 2013 Nepal |
- * Club domestic league appearances and goals

Mohammad Sidiq Walizada (born 27 December 1991) is an Afghan footballer who currently plays as a forward for v.v. Zuidland in the Netherlands, and for the Afghanistan national football team.

== Career ==
Sidiq began his football career in 2012 in the Netherlands. Currently he is playing for Rotterdam club v.v. Zuidland.

== Afghan Football Club World Championship ==
Walizada also plays for F.C. Holland. It is a team where players from all over Holland participate. The team made it to the final of the Afghan Football Club World Championship in Dubai. They played against Brishna F.C. and won the title by a goal from Walizada. He played an outstanding match. They also won a $50,000 cheque.

== International career ==
He scored a hat-trick in the 2nd, 36th, and 80th minutes of the match, in India, where Afghanistan played against Bhutan in the 2012 AFC Challenge Cup qualification.

== International goals ==
Scores and results list Afghanistan's goal tally first.

| No. | Date | Venue | Opponent | Score | Result | Competition |
|---|---|---|---|---|---|---|
| 1. | 23 March 2011 | Tau Devi Lal Stadium, Gurgaon, India | Bhutan | 1–0 | 3–0 | 2012 AFC Challenge Cup qualification |
| 2. | 23 March 2011 | Tau Devi Lal Stadium, Gurgaon, India | Bhutan | 2–0 | 3–0 | 2012 AFC Challenge Cup qualification |
| 3. | 23 March 2011 | Tau Devi Lal Stadium, Gurgaon, India | Bhutan | 3–0 | 3–0 | 2012 AFC Challenge Cup qualification |

== Personal ==
In 2011, he and his family did go to the Netherlands because of their safety. He is now living in the Netherlands and is hoping to play again for the Afghanistan national football team.

== Honours ==
Afghanistan

- SAFF Championship: 2013
