= Tau Devi Lal Stadium =

Sports venue in Gurgaon, India

- Interactive map of Tau Devi Lal Stadium
- Location: Gurgaon, Haryana, India
- Coordinates: 28°26′32″N 77°2′11″E
- Capacity: 12,000

Construction
- Opened: 2000
- Renovated: 2008

Ground information

International information
- Only women's ODI: 12 March 2004: India v West Indies
- As of 9 December 2019

Tau Devi Lal Stadium is a multi-purpose sports complex located in Gurgaon in the state of Haryana, India.

The site consists of two sports venues in addition to several practice facilities, namely cricket and football. It is mostly used by the Haryana cricket team.

== Cricket ==
The stadium hosts first-class matches for Haryana cricket team. It has floodlight facilities. The end names of the stadium are City End, Pioneer Urban End. The stadium is located in Sohna Road, Sector 38 in Gurgaon. The stadium has hosted a Women's ODI between India and West Indies in 2004. The match was won by India by 170 runs as Aru Kirkire scored a century and then Mamatha Maben took 4 wickets. The stadium was one of three venues which hosted unauthorized Indian Cricket League in 2008. The stadium has hosted 14 T-20 games of the league. School events are often organised and training of local Haryana teams takes place here.

== Football ==
On 23 March 2011, Afghanistan played Bhutan in 2012 AFC Challenge Cup qualification, which was won by Afghanistan 3–0. Sidiq Walizada scored the goals. Total attendance was 200, including around 50 Afghans. On 25 March they played again and Afghanistan won 2–0. Waheed Nadeem and Israfeel Kohistani of Afghanistan scored one Goal each in 60' and 64th minutes of the match. Total attendance was around 2,000 including around 200 Afghans.

== See also ==
- Tau Devi Lal Athletic Stadium (Panchkula)
- Tau Devi Lal Cricket Stadium
- Amity United FC
- Dominence of Haryana in sports
