= Vítor Almeida (footballer) =

Macanese footballer (born 1991)

Vítor Almeida 維托·阿爾梅達
Personal information
- Full name: Vítor Emanuel Prazeres de Almeida
- Date of birth: 5 February 1991 (age 35)
- Place of birth: Lisbon, Portugual
- Height: 1.82 m (6 ft 0 in)
- Position: Defender

Team information
- Current team: Must IPO

Youth career
- –2007: Casa Pia
- 2008–2010: Belenenses

Senior career*
Years	Team	Apps	(Gls)
2010	Belenenses	0	(0)
2010–2011	Odivelas	0	(0)
2011–2012	Carregado	29	(0)
2012–2014	Torreense	35	(2)
2013	→ Naval 1893 (loan)	1	(0)
2014–2015	Atlético CP	13	(0)
2015–2016	Sporting Macau	15	(4)
2017	Chao Pak Kei	57	(13)
2018–2020	Benfica de Macau	13	(7)
2021–	Chao Pak Kei	41	(9)

International career^{‡}
2023–2024	Macau	4	(0)
- * Club domestic league appearances and goals ‡ National team caps and goals as of 17 October 2023

Vítor Emanuel Prazeres de Almeida (born 5 February 1991), also known as Vítor Almeida (Chinese: 維托·阿爾梅達), is a footballer professional footballer who currently plays as a defender for Liga de Elite club Chao Pak Kei. Born in Portugal, he plays for the Macau national team.

== Career ==
On 20 August 2014, Almeida made his professional debut with Atlético in a 2014–15 Taça da Liga match against Beira-Mar. Later in his career, he has been spending time in Macau, including three years at Benfica de Macau. He was critical of the Macanese league not being held during the COVID-19 pandemic in 2020.

== International career ==
On June 19, 2023, Almeida made his debut for the Macau national team in a friendly match against Myanmar, which ended in defeat.

== Honours ==
=== Club ===
Chao Pak Kei

- Liga de Elite: 2021, 2022, 2023, 2025
- Taça de Macau: 2021
