= Guwanç Hangeldiýew =

Turkmenistan footballer

Personal information
- Date of birth: August 9, 1987 (age 39)
- Place of birth: Ashgabat, Turkmenistan, Soviet Union
- Position: Midfielder

Team information
- Current team: HTTU Aşgabat

Senior career*
| Years | Team | Apps | (Gls) |
| 2008– | HTTU Aşgabat | ? | (?) |

International career
| 2008–2012 | Turkmenistan | 9 | (2) |
- * Club domestic league appearances and goals as of March 23, 2011

Guwanç Hangeldiýew (born August 9, 1987) is a Turkmen footballer (midfielder) playing currently for HTTU Aşgabat. He scored in the game against Chinese Taipei in 2012 AFC Challenge Cup qualification.

== Career statistics ==
=== International ===
Appearances and goals by national team and year
| National team | Year | Apps | Goals |
|---|---|---|---|
| Turkmenistan | 2008 | 2 | 0 |
| Turkmenistan | 2009 | 1 | 0 |
| Turkmenistan | 2010 | – | |
| Turkmenistan | 2011 | 4 | 1 |
| Turkmenistan | 2012 | 2 | 1 |
| Total | | 9 | 2 |

Scores and results list Turkmenistan's goal tally first, score column indicates score after each Hangeldiýew goal.

List of international goals scored by Guwanç Hangeldiýew
| No. | Date | Venue | Opponent | Score | Result | Competition |
|---|---|---|---|---|---|---|
| 1 | 23 March 2011 | Petaling Jaya Stadium, Petaling Jaya, Malaysia | Chinese Taipei | 2–0 | 2–0 | 2012 AFC Challenge Cup qualification |
| 2 | 12 March 2012 | Dasharath Rangasala, Kathmandu, Nepal | Nepal | 3–0 | 3–0 | 2012 AFC Challenge Cup |
