= Panai Kongpraphan =

Thai footballer (born 1983)

Personal information
- Full name: Panai Kongpraphan
- Date of birth: 16 June 1983 (age 43)
- Place of birth: Phatthalung, Thailand
- Height: 1.74 m (5 ft 8 1/2 in)
- Positions: Attacking midfielder; forward

Senior career*
Years	Team	Apps	(Gls)
2004–2007	BEC Tero Sasana	38	(7)
2008	Nakhon Pathom	15	(2)
2009–2010	BEC Tero Sasana	4	(0)
2010–2012	Songkhla	25	(4)
2012–2013	Assumption United	21	(3)
2013–2014	Chiangmai	16	(1)
- * Club domestic league appearances and goals as of 22 June 2008

Panai Kongpraphan (Thai ปณัย คงประพันธ์ ), born June 16, 1983) is a Thai retired footballer. He played for Thailand Premier League clubside BEC Tero Sasana in 2004-2007. Transferred to Nakhon Pathom in 2008 and came back to BEC Tero Sasana in 2009 but less opportunity about position. Until July 2010 Songkhla FC, Thai Division 1 League clubside offered for bought him. Finally, he transferred to Songkhla FC kept secret about him value.

He played for BEC Tero Sasana in the 2004 AFC Champions League group stage, where he scored one goal. He also played for BEC Tero Sasana in the ASEAN Club Championship 2003, scoring a goal as they lost the final to Kingfisher East Bengal FC.

== Honours ==
Thailand U-19

- AFF U-20 Youth Championship: 2002

== International goals ==
=== Under-19 ===
#	Date	Venue	Opponent	Score	Result	Competition
1.	January 23, 2002	Bangkok, Thailand	Singapore	3-1	5-1	2002 AFF U-20 Youth Championship
2.	January 23, 2002	Bangkok, Thailand	Singapore	4-1	5-1	2002 AFF U-20 Youth Championship
3.	January 28, 2002	Bangkok, Thailand	Malaysia	1-0	8-1	2002 AFF U-20 Youth Championship
4.	February 1, 2002	Bangkok, Thailand	Vietnam	1-0	3-2	2002 AFF U-20 Youth Championship
