= Chong In Leong =

Macanese footballer

Personal information
- Full name: Chong In Leong
- Date of birth: 25 May 1980 (age 46)
- Place of birth: Macau
- Height: 1.65 m (5 ft 5 in)
- Position: Striker

Senior career*
Years	Team	Apps	(Gls)
2002–2009	Serviços de Alfândega		
2010	Windsor Arch Ka I		
2011–2014	Serviços de Alfândega		

International career^{‡}
2001–	Macau	24	(3)
- * Club domestic league appearances and goals as of 18 May 2018 ‡ National team caps and goals as of 18 May 2018

Chong In Leong(梁仲然) is a Macanese footballer who plays as a striker for Windsor Arch Ka I.
