= Ho Man Fai =

Macanese footballer

Ho Man Fai 何文輝
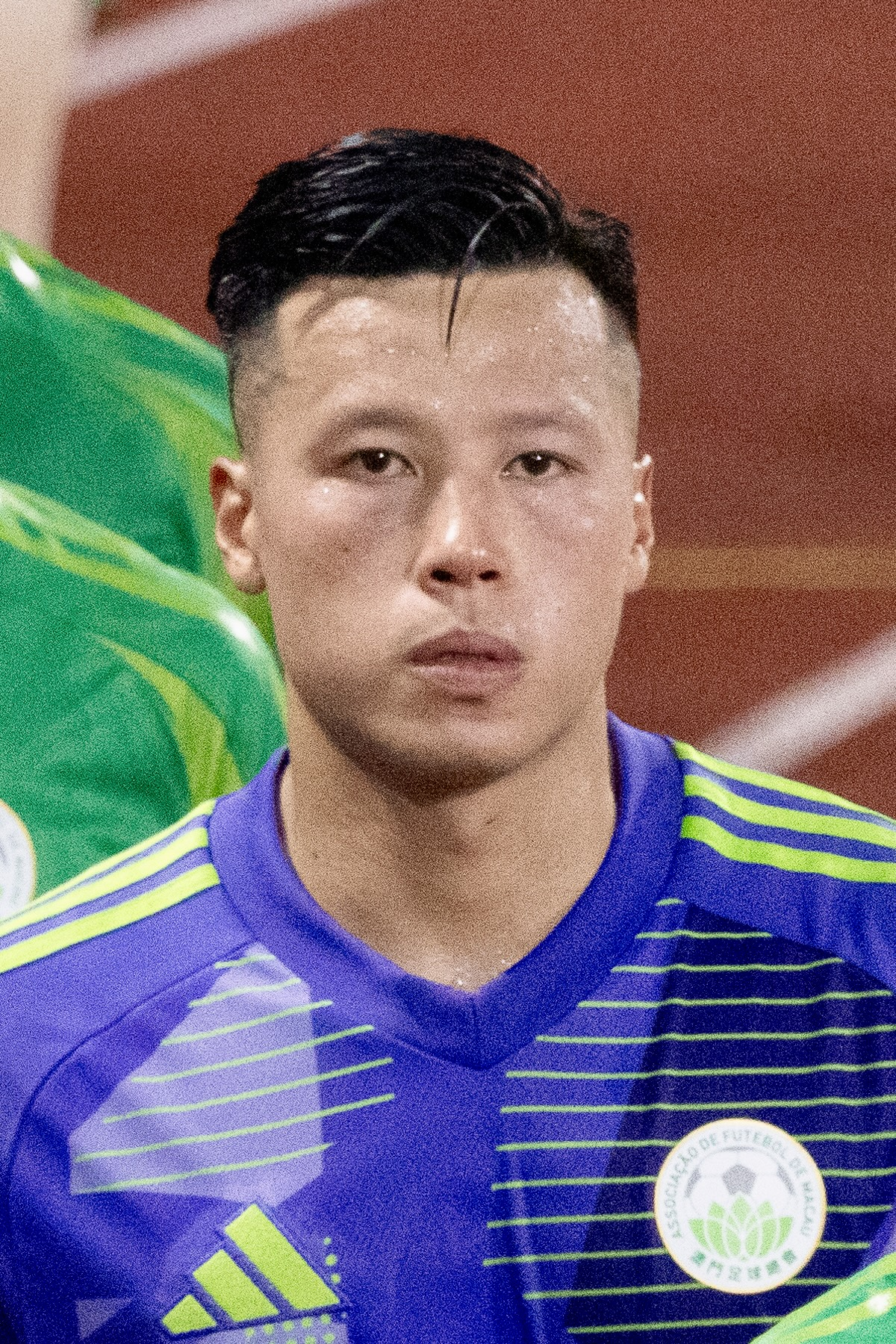
- Ho with Macau in 2024

Personal information
- Full name: Ho Man Fai
- Date of birth: 24 April 1993 (age 33)
- Place of birth: Portuguese Macau
- Height: 1.78 m (5 ft 10 in)
- Position: Goalkeeper

Team information
- Current team: Sha Tin
- Number: 93

Senior career*
Years	Team	Apps	(Gls)
2011–2013	MFA Development	31	(0)
2014–2019	Monte Carlo	82	(3)
2020–2025	Chao Pak Kei	70	(0)
2025–2026	Tai Po	0	(0)
2026–	Sha Tin	4	(0)

International career^{‡}
2011–	Macau	47	(0)
- * Club domestic league appearances and goals as of 13 September 2026 ‡ National team caps and goals as of 19 March 2025

Ho Man Fai (Chinese: 何文輝; born 24 April 1993) is a Macanese professional footballer who currently plays as a goalkeeper for Hong Kong Premier League club Sha Tin and the Macau national team.

== Club career ==
On 2 December 2019, Ho announced that he would travel to Thai League 1 club Chonburi for a trial and training from 15 December.

On 15 September 2025, Ho moved abroad and joined Hong Kong Premier League club Tai Po.

On 8 August 2026, Ho joined another HKPL club Sha Tin.

== International career ==
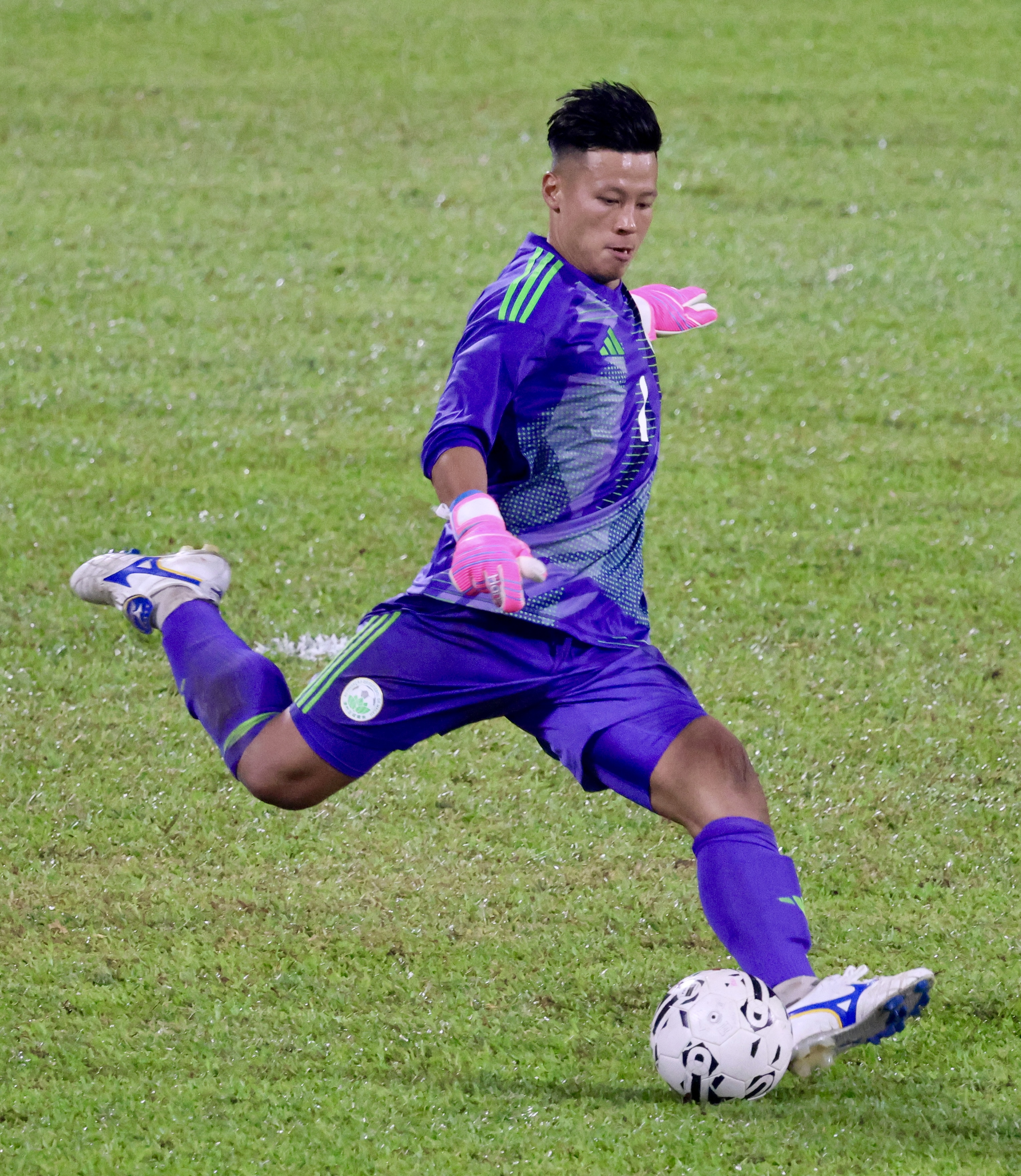
Ho taking a goal kick in a match against Brunei during the 2027 AFC Asian Cup qualification match.

On 30 March 2016, Macau drew 0–0 away to Malaysia. Ho was considered the best player on the night as he made several crucial saves to deny the Malaysians.

Ho was a member of the Macau national football team that finished second in the 2016 AFC Solidarity Cup.

== Honours ==
Tai Po

- Hong Kong FA Cup: 2025–26
- Hong Kong Senior Shield: 2025–26
