= Pang Chi Hang =

Macau footballer

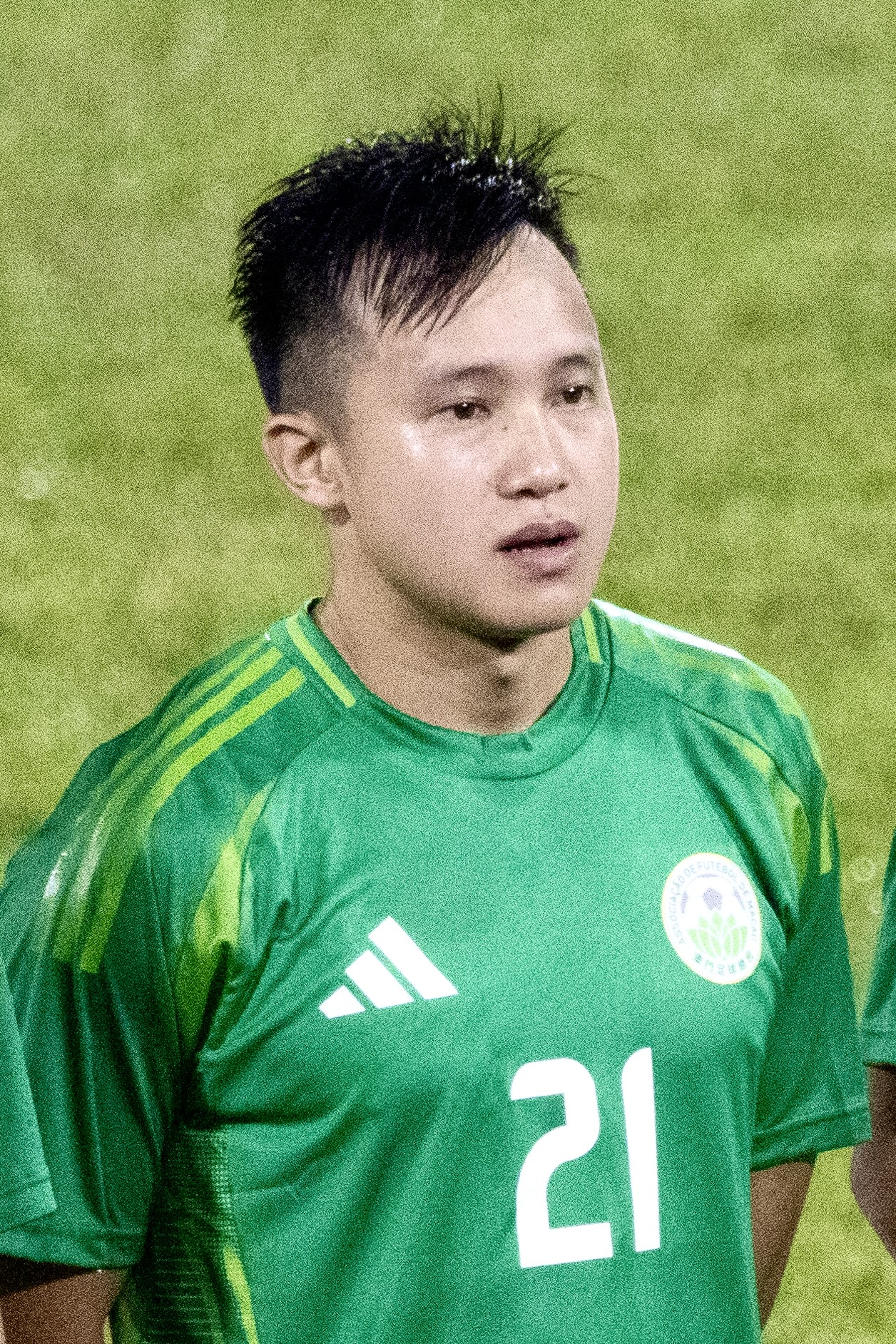
- Pang with Macau in 2024

Personal information
- Date of birth: 3 November 1993 (age 32)
- Place of birth: Macau
- Height: 1.75 m (5 ft 9 in)
- Positions: Midfielder; forward

Team information
- Current team: Chao Pak Kei

Senior career*
Years	Team	Apps	(Gls)
- Lai Chi
2012	Ka I	14	(2)
2013	Lam Pak	9	(1)
2014–2016	Lai Chi	47	(19)
2017–2018	Benfica (Macau)	30	(6)
2019–	Chao Pak Kei	25	(9)

International career
2012–	Macau	33	(1)
- * Club domestic league appearances and goals

Pang Chi Hang (Chinese: 彭梓亨; born 3 November 1993) is a Macau footballer who plays as a midfielder or forward for Chao Pak Kei.

== Career ==
Pang started his career with Macau third division side Lai Chi. After that, he played for Ka I in the Macau top flight.

In 2017, he trialed for Hong Kong club Yuen Long, before working as a sports journalist.

== International goals ==
No.	Date	Venue	Opponent	Score	Result	Competition
1.	23 July 2014	Guam Football Association National Training Center, Dededo, Guam	Northern Mariana Islands	1–0	1–2	2015 EAFF East Asian Cup
