= Iong Cho Ieng =

Macau football manager

Personal information
- Full name: Iong Cho Ieng
- Date of birth: 1 September 1973 (age 53)
- Place of birth: Macau

Managerial career
- Years: Team
- MFA Development
- Macau U18
- 2018–2019: Macau

Iong Cho Ieng (Chinese: 容楚英; pinyin: Róng Chǔyīng; born 1 September 1973) is a football coach, currently managing Macau.

== Managerial career ==
In 2005, Iong joined the coaching staff for the Macau national football team. In 2016, Iong was appointed head coach of the Macau's under-18 team. In April 2018, after serving as assistant under former managers Tam Iao San and Chan Hiu Ming, Iong was named manager of Macau.
