= Cheang Cheng Ieong =

Macau footballer

Personal information
- Full name: Paulo Cheang Cheng Ieong
- Date of birth: 15 August 1984 (age 42)
- Place of birth: Macau
- Height: 5 ft 8 in (1.73 m)
- Position: Midfielder

Team information
- Current team: C.D. Monte Carlo
- Number: 8

Youth career
- 2003–2005: Heng Tai

Senior career*
Years	Team	Apps	(Gls)
2005–2008	Monte Carlo		
2009–2010	Windsor Arch Ka I		
2010	Lam Pak	7	(0)
2010–	Monte Carlo		

International career
2005–2018	Macau	58	(0)
- * Club domestic league appearances and goals as of 17:33, 24 September 2016 (UTC)

Paulo Cheang Cheng Ieong (鄭正揚; born 18 August 1984) is a Macanese professional footballer. He plays as a midfielder and is the captain and record cap-holder of the Macau national football team.

== Career ==
Cheang's club career began playing for Macau giants C.D. Monte Carlo, where he first played in the 2004–05 season. while at the club, his team occupied respectively the third position (2004–05 season), second (season 2005–06) and fourth (season 2006–07), and in the 2007–08 season C.D. Monte Carlo won the title. After this success, Cheang moved to the club Windsor Arch Ka I, whom in the 2008–09 he guided to win the title after a late January transfer move. In 2010, he arrived for a short stint at G.D. Lam Pak, where he played 7 games before leaving for C.D. Monte Carlo, a team he still played for 6 years later.

== Career statistics ==
=== International ===
Appearances and goals by national team and year
National team	Year	Apps	Goals
Macau	2005	1	0
Macau	2006	3	0
Macau	2007	6	0
Macau	2008	2	0
Macau	2009	6	0
Macau	2010	3	0
Macau	2011	7	0
Macau	2012	2	0
Macau	2013	3	0
Macau	2014	4	0
Macau	2015	4	0
Macau	2016	9	0
Macau	2017	5	0
Macau	2018	3	0
Total		58	0
