= Chan Man =

Macau footballer

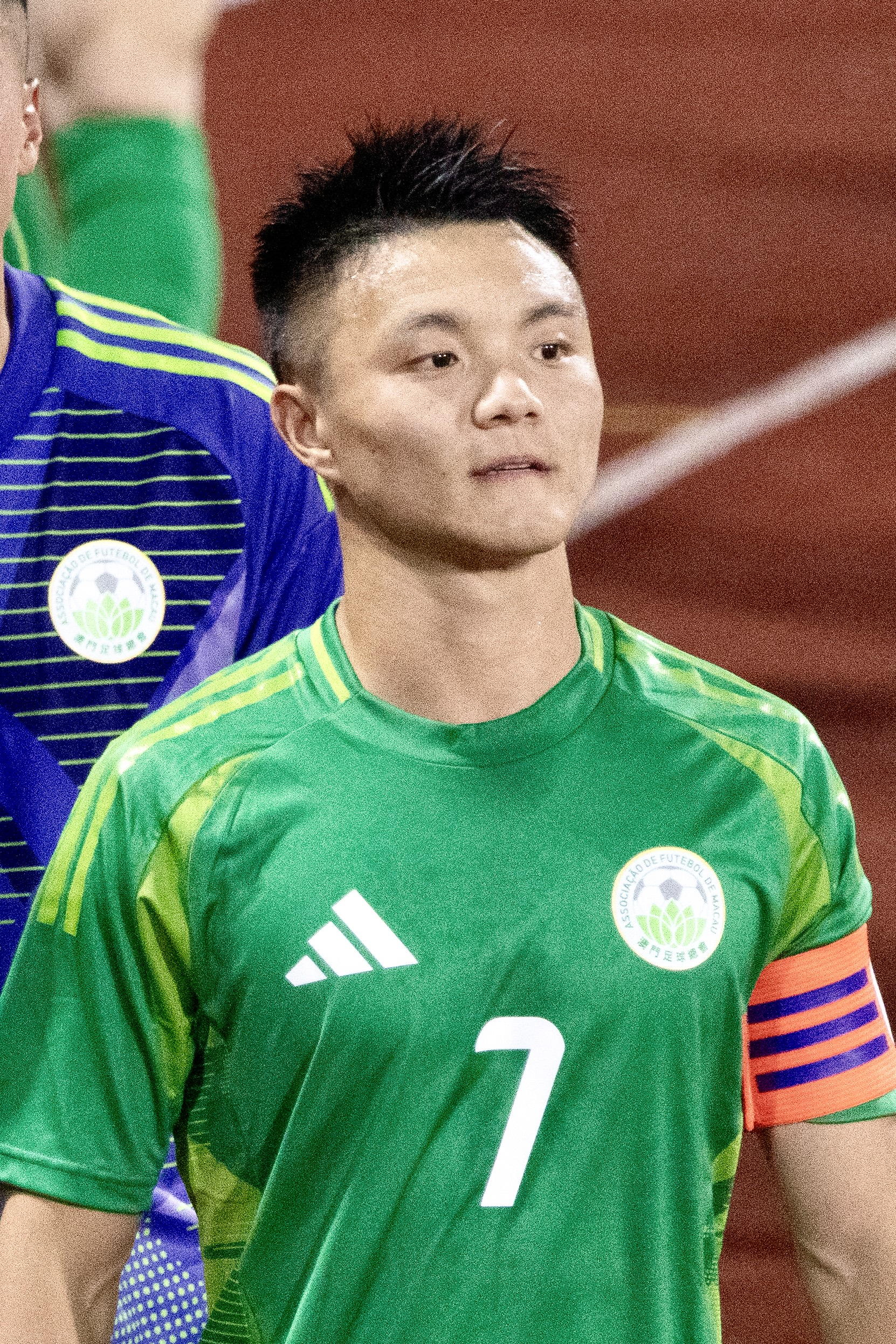
- Chan captaining Macau in 2024

Personal information
- Full name: Jerry Chan Man
- Date of birth: 4 October 1993 (age 33)
- Place of birth: Autonomous Region of Macau, Portugal
- Height: 1.71 m (5 ft 7 1/2 in)
- Position: Defender

Senior career*
Years	Team	Apps	(Gls)
2012–2014	Monte Carlo	44	(8)
2015–2016	Benfica de Macau	16	(3)
2017	Olhanense	0	(0)
2018–2026	Benfica de Macau	64	(24)

International career^{‡}
2011–	Macau	24	(2)
- * Club domestic league appearances and goals as of 18 March 2018 ‡ National team caps and goals as of 7 June 2019

Jerry Chan Man (Chinese: 陳敏; born 4 October 1993) is a Macanese footballer. He currently plays as a defender for the Macau national team, which he captains.

== Honours ==
Benfica de Macau

- Liga de Elite: 2015, 2016

Individual

- Macau Footballer of the Year: 2015–16

== Personal life ==
In addition to playing football part time, Chan is a firefighter in Macau.

== International goals ==
No.	Date	Venue	Opponent	Score	Result	Competition
1.	25 July 2014	GFA National Training Center, Dededo, Guam	Mongolia	?–?	3–2	2015 EAFF East Asian Cup
2.	4 July 2016	GFA National Training Center, Dededo, Guam	Chinese Taipei	0–1	3–2	2017 EAFF E-1 Football Championship
