= Heng Tai =

- Full name: Heng Tai
- Nickname(s): The Mercenaries
- Founded: 1986
- Ground: Campo Desportivo da UCTM & Estádio Campo Desportivo; Macau
- Capacity: 1,700 & 15,490
- Chairman: Firmino Mendonça
- League: Campeonato da 1ª Divisão do Futebol

Heng Tai (Chinese: 兄弟體育會) is a Macau football club, which plays in the city of Macau. They play in the Macau's first division, the Campeonato da 1ª Divisão do Futebol.

== Achievements ==
- Macau Championship: 0

== Squad list (2006/07) ==
No.	Player
2	Tam Yan-wing
3	Chan Yuet
4	Lam Yui-chi
5	Mui Chung-lam
6	Lee Wing-chi
7	Cheuk Ho-kei
8	So Hoi-tin
9	Ning Siu-yin
11	Ho Wing-fai
12	Mak Ka-chun
15	Ho Ka-wing
16	Mok Chi-wai
17	Ku Yi-si
18	Ching Ka-wai ("keywai")
19	Cheung Yin-yuen
21	Chow Wai-nang
30	Chan Yu
31	Ku Shing-chung
—	Yue Hing
—	Cheung Kwok-man
—	Yeung Tsz-kin
—	Lui Wai-lung
