= C.D. Monte Carlo =

Macanese football club

- Full name: Clube Desportivo Monte Carlo 蒙地卡羅體育會
- Nickname: Os Canarinhos (The Canaries)
- Short name: CDMC
- Founded: 1984; 42 years ago
- Ground: Estádio Campo Desportivo
- Capacity: 16,272
- President: Firmino Mendonça
- Head coach: (Macau) Tam Iao San
- 2024: 4th
Home colours	Away colours

Clube Desportivo Monte Carlo (Chinese: 蒙地卡羅體育會; also known as C.D. Monte Carlo or simply Monte Carlo) is a Macanese football club.

Founded in 1984, the club is one of the most successful in Macau's history, having won the Liga de Elite title five times. They are known by the nickname The Canaries (Portuguese: Os Canarinhos) due to their yellow home kit, resembling the colors of the Brazilian national team or the French club FC Nantes.

== History ==
=== Foundation and Early Years ===
C.D. Monte Carlo was established in 1984. Initially formed as a social and sports club for the local community, the team gradually professionalized as the football scene in Macau developed. They entered the lower divisions and worked their way up to the top tier, establishing themselves as a competitive force by the late 1990s.

=== The Golden Era (2000s) ===
The early 2000s marked the golden era for Monte Carlo. Under the guidance of ambitious management, the club dominated domestic football. They won three consecutive league titles in 2002, 2003, and 2004.

This success led to Monte Carlo representing Macau in the 2002–03 AFC Champions League. In the qualification round, they faced South Korean side Daejeon Citizen. Although they were eliminated, the experience of playing in the continent's premier club competition was a significant milestone for Macanese football.

Despite the team's success, it announced prior to the 2025 season that it would no longer compete it top flight football, surrendering its position in the league. The club cited a lack of support of football in the territory and a lack of financial sponsorships supporting the club.

=== Continued Competitiveness and Rivalries ===
After their initial dominance, the league became more competitive with the rise of other clubs such as S.L. Benfica de Macau and later Chao Pak Kei. Despite this, Monte Carlo remained a top contender, securing additional league titles in 2008 and 2013.

In recent years, the club has frequently finished as runners-up (in 2011, 2012, 2017, and 2022), establishing a reputation as one of the "Big Three" in Macau alongside Benfica and CPK.

=== Recent History ===
In the 2023 season, Monte Carlo achieved significant success by winning the Taça de Macau (Macau FA Cup), defeating rivals Benfica de Macau in the final. This victory secured them a spot in the 2023–24 AFC Cup play-offs, marking their return to continental competition after several years.

In the 2024 Liga de Elite season, the club underwent a transition period with a squad mixing experienced veterans and young local talents, finishing the season in 4th place.

== Stadium ==
Due to the structure of the Liga de Elite, C.D. Monte Carlo does not possess a private home stadium. Instead, the team plays its matches at centralized, neutral venues managed by the Sports Bureau of Macau.

Primary venues include:

- Estádio Campo Desportivo (Macau Olympic Complex Stadium): Located in Taipa, this is the largest sporting venue in the territory with a capacity of 16,272. It typically hosts major league fixtures and international competitions.
- Lin Fong Sports Centre (Estádio do Canídromo): Situated on the Macau Peninsula, this venue is frequently utilized for regular league matches.

== Honours ==
=== League ===
- Liga de Elite
  - Champions (5): 2002, 2003, 2004, 2008, 2013
  - Runners-up (4): 2006, 2011, 2012, 2017, 2022

=== Cup ===
- Taça de Macau
  - Champions (1): 2023
  - Runners-up: 2022

== Continental history ==
Season	Competition	Round	Club	Home	Away	Aggregate
2002–03	AFC Champions League	Qualification round 2	(South Korea) Daejeon Citizen	1–5	0–3	1–8

Season	Competition	Round	Club	Home	Away	Aggregate
2023–24	AFC Cup	Play-off round	(Chinese Taipei) Taichung Futuro	1–2		

== Club Officials ==
Position	Name
President	(Macau) Firmino Mendonça
Head coach	(Macau) Tam Iao San
Assistant Coach	(Macau) Cheang Chon Man
Team Manager	(Macau) Lei Kam Hong

== Squad ==
Squad for the 2024 Liga de Elite Note: Flags indicate national team as defined under FIFA eligibility rules; some limited exceptions apply. Players may hold more than one non-FIFA nationality.

No.	Pos.	Nation	Player
1	GK	POR	Juan Castro [C]
4	DF	MAC	Fong Chi Wa
7	MF	MAC	Huan U Hin
9	FW	MAC	Huan Cho Fong
10	DF	MAC	Si Tou Seng Hang
11	MF	MAC	Leong Ka Fat
12	MF	MAC	Lei Man Long
14	DF	MAC	Cheng Ka Chon
16	MF	MAC	Tou Cheok Lam
17	MF	MAC	Kuan Alexandre
18	FW	MAC	Choi Weng Hou
19	MF	MAC	Vong Chak Man
21	DF	MAC	Li Yu Xuan
22	DF	MAC	Tai Lok In
26	GK	MAC	Tang Chi Hou
41	DF	MAC	Pao Chon Kit
43	MF	PHI	Adrien Ebitner

No.	Pos.	Nation	Player
68	DF	MAC	Ho Pak Kei
71	MF	MAC	Lam Chou Fai
77	MF	MAC	Tam Hou Fong
81	FW	BRA	Maronesi William
83	MF	MAC	Wong Hoi Wai
86	FW	GHA	Felix Adzayi
89	MF	MAC	Matthew Li
90	MF	MAC	Ung U Hin
91	DF	MAC	Lai Kin Wa
92	MF	MAC	Salem Hussen
93	MF	MAC	U Chao Pok Hin
94	DF	MAC	Hon Kit Man
95	MF	MAC	Chan Chou Lam
96	MF	MAC	Ntambi Ibrahim
97	DF	MAC	Nao Ka Wu
98	GK	MAC	Alexandre Quartermain
99	FW	MAC	Pacheco Rafael

== Notable Former players ==
- (Macau) Miguel Heitor
- (Macau) Geofredo de Sousa
- (Macau) Chan Man
- (Macau) Vernon Wong
- (Brazil) Paulo Cheang
