= Macau national football team =

National association football team

Macau
- Nickname(s): Seleção do Lótus (The Lotus' Team); Verdes (The Greens)
- Association: Associação de Futebol de Macau-China (AFM)
- Confederation: AFC (Asia)
- Sub-confederation: EAFF (East Asia)
- Head coach: Emmanuel Noruega (caretaker)
- Captain: Chan Man
- Most caps: Cheang Cheng Ieong (58)
- Top scorer: Chan Kin Seng (17)
- Home stadium: Estádio Campo Desportivo
- FIFA code: MAC
First colours	Second colours

FIFA ranking
- Current: 193 (7 October 2026)
- Highest: 156 (September 1997)
- Lowest: 204 (July 2014)

First international
- Macau 4–2 Hong Kong (Macau; 29 March 1948)

Biggest win
- Macau 6–1 Northern Mariana Islands (Yona, Guam; 11 March 2009)

Biggest defeat
- Macau 0–10 Japan (Muscat, Oman; 25 March 1997); Japan 10–0 Macau (Tokyo, Japan; 22 June 1997)

AFC Solidarity Cup
- Appearances: 1 (first in 2016)
- Best result: Runners-up (2016)

AFC Challenge Cup
- Appearances: 1 (first in 2006)
- Best result: Group stage (2006)

Macau national football team
- Traditional Chinese: 澳門足球代表隊
Transcriptions
Yue: Cantonese
- Jyutping: Ou3 mun2 zuk1 kau4 doi6 biu2 deoi2
- IPA: ōumǔːn.tsʊ́k̚kʰɐ̏u.tɔ̀ːipǐːutɵ̌y

The Macau national football team (Chinese: 澳門足球代表隊; Portuguese: Seleção Macaense de Futebol; recognised as Macau, China by FIFA) represents the Chinese special administrative region of Macau in international association football. The team is supervised by the Football Association of Macau, China (Chinese: 中國澳門足球總會; Portuguese: Associação de Futebol de Macau-China). The Macau football team has a ranking that is one of the lowest among the FIFA members.

The national team has never qualified for the FIFA World Cup, AFC Asian Cup or EAFF East Asian Championship. The team qualified for the 2006 AFC Challenge Cup, where they got one draw and two losses.

The team had been representing Macau in international football events before 1999 when Macau was a dependent territory of Portugal. It continues to represent Macau even after Macau was handed over to the People's Republic of China by Portugal and became a special administrative region of China in 1999. This team is separate from the China national football team, as the Basic Law and the principle of "one country, two systems" allows Macau to maintain its own representative teams in international sports competitions. In Macau, the Macau football team is colloquially referred to as the "Macau team" (澳門隊), while the Chinese national team is referred to as the "national team" (國家隊).

== History ==
Macau participated in the inaugural 2006 AFC Challenge Cup held in Bangladesh being grouped with Kyrgyzstan, Tajikistan and Pakistan but lost all of their match against their opponent.

Macau then participated in the inaugural 2016 AFC Solidarity Cup held in Kuching, Malaysia being grouped with Laos, Mongolia and Sri Lanka. In the first match, Macau won Mongolia 2–1 with captain, Niki Torrão scoring a brace. The following match, Macau won Laos 4–1 before eventually drawing to Sri Lanka 1–1 which see Macau advanced to the semi-finals as group leaders. Macau faced Brunei which Leong Ka Hang rescued Macau from a one goal deficit to level the match at 1–1 seeing both sides off to extra time however the match goes on to penalties shoot out with Macau advancing to their first even international cup final. On 15 November 2016, Macau faced Nepal however in the 29' minute of the match, Nepalese Sujal Shrestha break the deadlock and Nepal ended up winning the 2016 AFC Solidarity Cup at the Sarawak Stadium. Leong Ka Hang is given the tournament 'Most Valuable Player' and Niki Torrão as the top joint goal scorer with 4 goals.

During the 2022 FIFA World Cup qualification against Sri Lanka in which they won the first tie 1–0, they forfeited the second tie which awarded Sri Lanka was awarded as a 3–0 victory to Sri Lanka after Macau did not send their team for the match due to safety reasons following the 2019 Sri Lanka Easter bombings. After a 4 years hiatus from the COVID-19 pandemic, On 26 March 2023, Macau play their first ever international matches at their own ground, Estádio Campo Desportivo against Singapore in a 1–0 defeat. On 19 June 2023, Macau travelled to Dalian, China to face Myanmar in a friendly match. Since their returned to international football, Macau mostly played against Southeast Asian country like Cambodia and Brunei.

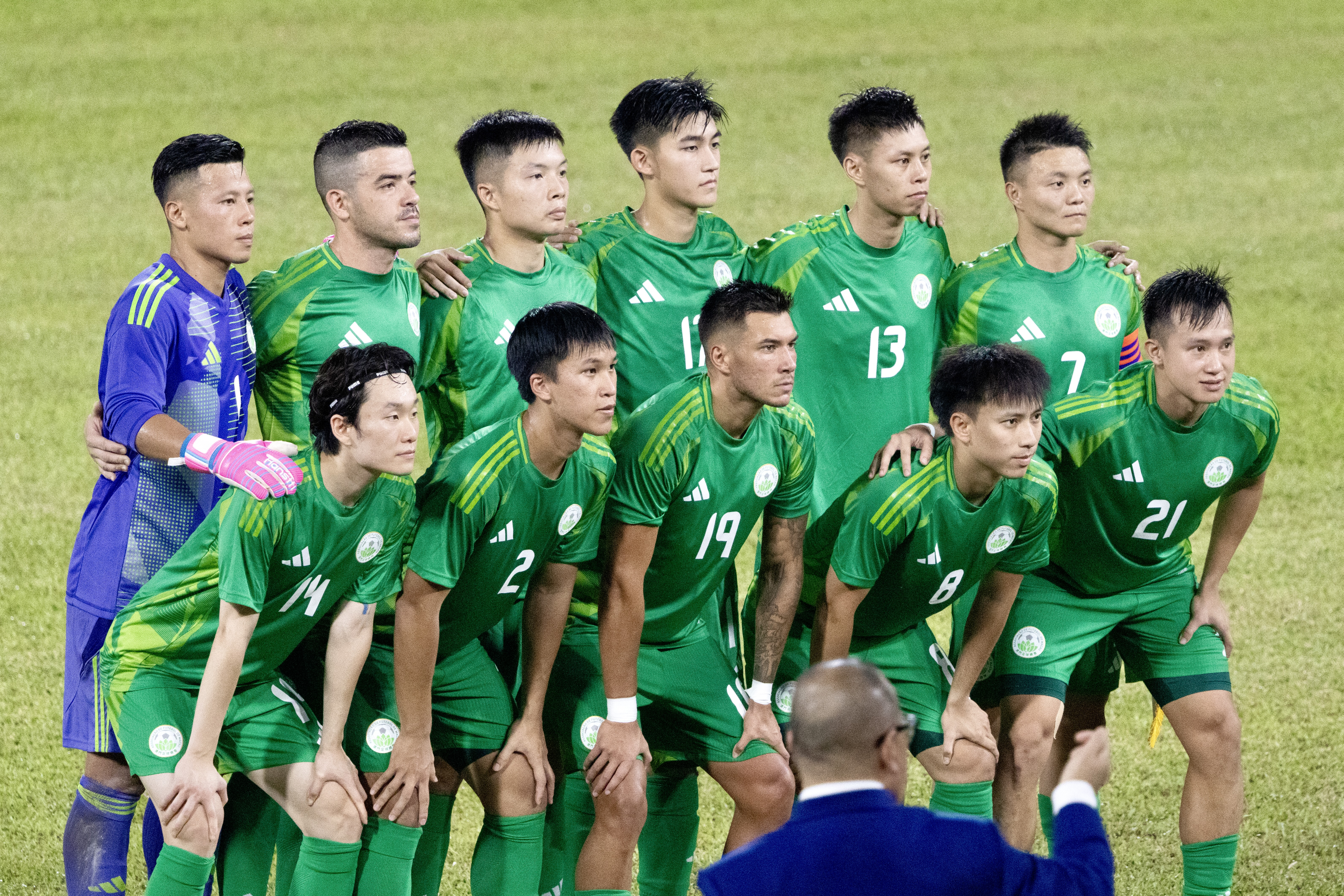
Macau starting line-up during the 2027 AFC Asian Cup qualification play off round against Brunei.

In August 2024, all non-Chinese nationals listed to play for the Macau Football Association became ineligible for the team under FIFA Congress's adoption to a rule amendment made in 18 September 2020. The players affected include Vitor Almeida, Iuri Capelo, captain Nicholas Torrão, and Filipe Duarte, as well as a fifth player who was about to join up.

In September 2024, Macau signed a deal with Adidas in preparation for the 2027 AFC Asian Cup qualification – play-off round ending their 10-years partnership with Nike. It also seen the team back in Adidas since 2004 making their debut against Brunei.

== Rivalries ==
=== Hong Kong ===
The Hong Kong–Macau rivalry has been contested by Hong Kong Football Association and Macau Football Association since 1937.

== FIFA suspension ==
In 2005, Macau was temporarily barred by FIFA from entering any international matches because of alleged undue influence of the government in forming the committee of its football association. The suspension was lifted after rectification by Macau.

== Results and fixtures ==
The following is a list of match results in the last 12 months, as well as any future matches that have been scheduled.

Win Draw Loss Fixture

=== 2026 ===
7 February Friendly	Guangdong XI (China)	2–0	Macau	Zhongshan, China
		Report		Stadium: Zhongshan Sports Center Stadium

10 February Friendly	Macau	3–2	(China) Guangdong XI	Taipa, Macau
	Leung Chi Seng 3'; Lei Cheng Lam 67'; Leong Wai Hin 89'	Report		Stadium: Estádio Campo Desportivo

26 March 2026 FIFA Series	Aruba	4–1	Macau	Kigali, Rwanda
13:30 UTC+2	Fermina 5'; Romano 13', 16'; Van Kilsdonk 66'	Report	Leong Ka Hang 88'	Stadium: Kigali Pelé Stadium; Referee: Samuel Uwikunda (Rwanda)

29 March 2026 FIFA Series	Macau	0–6	Tanzania	Kigali, Rwanda
15:00 UTC+2		Report	Amâncio 16' (o.g.); Mwamnyeto 26'; Yahya 45'; Peter 56'; Miroshi 74'; Allarakhia 87'	Stadium: Kigali Pelé Stadium; Attendance: 12,900; Referee: Lucky Kasalirwe (Uganda)

== Coaching staff ==
Position	Name
Team manager	(Macau) Zhang Liqun
Technical director	(Macau) Iong Cho Ieng
Head coach (acting)	(Macau) Emmanuel Noruega
Assistant coaches	(Portugal) Pedro Simões (Macau) Lai Yong (Macau) Luo Wei Xing (Macau) Cai Cheng Zhang (Macau) Lok Chong Keong
Team doctor	(Macau) Liu Zhiliang --->

=== Coaching history ===
- (Portugal) João dos Santos (1996–1998)
- (Japan) Eiji Ueda (2000–2002)
- (Japan) Masataka Imai (2003–2004)
- (Japan) Masanaga Kageyama (2006–2008)
- (Hong Kong) Leung Sui Wing (2008–2015)
- (Macau) Tam Iao San (2015–2017)
- (Hong Kong) Chan Hiu Ming (2017–2018)
- (Macau) Iong Cho Ieng (2018–2019)
- (Angola) Lázaro Oliveira (2020–2024)
- (Hong Kong) Kwok Kar Lok (2024–2025)

== Players ==
=== Current squad ===
The following players are selected for the match against Hong Kong on 19 March 2025.

Caps and goals correct as of 12 December 2024, after the match against Guam.

No.	Pos.	Player	Date of birth (age)	Caps	Goals	Club
1	GK	Ho Man Fai	24 April 1993 (age 33)	45	0	(Football Association of Hong Kong, China) Sha Tin
20	GK	Fong Chi Hang	26 October 1989 (age 37)	2	0	(Macau Football Association) Cheng Fung
22	GK	Lei Wa Si	21 August 2000 (age 26)	0	0	(Macau Football Association) Shao Jiang
2	DF	Marcos Cheong	25 August 2002 (age 24)	1	0	(Macau Football Association) Benfica de Macau
3	DF	Amâncio	29 March 1990 (age 36)	8	0	(Macau Football Association) Benfica de Macau
4	DF	Kam Chi Hou	4 April 1995 (age 31)	17	0	(Macau Football Association) Benfica de Macau
5	DF	Xiao Rongrui	25 February 2002 (age 24)	0	0	(Macau Football Association) Universidade de Macau
7	DF	Chan Man (Captain)	4 October 1993 (age 33)	32	2	(Macau Football Association) Benfica de Macau
13	DF	Sou Hin Nang	24 May 2005 (age 21)	0	0	(Macau Football Association) Universidade de Macau
16	DF	Lam Weng Kin	17 July 2006 (age 20)	0	0	(Macau Football Association) Shao Jiang
8	MF	Ng Wa Keng	2 August 1999 (age 27)	11	0	(Macau Football Association) Benfica de Macau
9	MF	Si Hou In	21 October 2004 (age 22)	1	0	(Macau Football Association) Cheng Fung
10	MF	Dion Carlos Choi	6 February 1999 (age 27)	6	0	(Macau Football Association) Chao Pak Kei
11	MF	Ieong Lek Hang	11 November 2003 (age 22)	1	0	(Macau Football Association) Universidade de Macau
15	MF	Cheong Hoi San	26 June 1998 (age 28)	15	0	(Macau Football Association) Shao Jiang
18	MF	Nuno Jerónimo	2 November 1997 (age 28)	6	0	(Macau Football Association) Chao Pak Kei
23	MF	Ho Chi Fong	30 September 1994 (age 32)	15	0	(Macau Football Association) Chao Pak Kei
12	FW	Gu Hoi Sou	5 January 2005 (age 21)	0	0	(Macau Football Association) Chao Pak Kei
14	FW	Leung Chi Seng	3 June 2000 (age 26)	8	0	(Macau Football Association) Chao Pak Kei
17	FW	Lei Cheng Lam	24 January 2005 (age 21)	5	1	(Macau Football Association) Universidade de Macau
19	FW	Ng Lai Teng	6 November 2004 (age 21)	1	0	(Macau Football Association) Cheng Fung
21	FW	Pang Chi Hang	3 November 1993 (age 32)	34	1	(Macau Football Association) Chao Pak Kei

=== Recent call-ups ===
The following players have also been called up to the Macau squad within the previous 12 months.

Pos.	Player	Date of birth (age)	Caps	Goals	Club	Latest call-up
^{INJ} Player withdrew from the squad due to an injury^{PRE} Preliminary squad^{WD} Player withdrew from the squad.^{RET} Player retired from international football

== Records ==
As of 19 March 2025
Players in bold are still active with Macau.

=== Most appearances ===
Rank	Player	Caps	Goals	Period
1	Cheang Cheng Ieong	58	0	2005–2018
2	**Ho Man Fai**	47	0	2011–present
3	Kong Cheng Hou	43	0	2006–2019
4	**Pang Chi Hang**	36	1	2012–present
5	Che Chi Man	34	6	1996–2013
6	**Chan Man**	33	2	2011–present
6	Geofredo Cheung	33	3	2001–2011
8	Lei Ka Him	31	1	2010–2019
9	Lam Ka Seng	30	6	2014–2023
9	Lao Pak Kin	30	1	2005–2017
9	**Leong Ka Hang**	30	12	2010–present

=== Top goalscorers ===
Rank	Player	Goals	Caps	Ratio	Period
1	Chan Kin Seng	17	29	0.59	2006–2013
2	**Leong Ka Hang**	12	30	0.4	2010–present
3	Niki Torrão	9	21	0.43	2011–2023
4	Lam Ka Seng	6	30	0.2	2014–2023
4	Che Chi Man	6	34	0.18	1996–2013
6	Ho Man Hou	5	19	0.26	2006–2015
7	Carlos Leonel	4	8	0.5	2017–2018
7	Pelé	4	9	0.44	1996–1997
9	Filipe Duarte	3	13	0.23	2016–2023
9	Chong In Leong	3	24	0.13	2001–2011
9	Geofredo Cheung	3	33	0.09	2001–2011

== Competitive record ==
=== FIFA World Cup ===
FIFA World Cup									Qualification					
Year	Result	Position	Pld	W	D*	L	F	A	Pld	W	D	L	F	A
(Uruguay) 1930	Part of Portugal								Part of Portugal					
(Italy) 1934	Part of Portugal								Part of Portugal					
(France) 1938	Part of Portugal								Part of Portugal					
(Brazil) 1950	Part of Portugal								Part of Portugal					
(Switzerland) 1954	Part of Portugal								Part of Portugal					
(Sweden) 1958	Part of Portugal								Part of Portugal					
(Chile) 1962	Part of Portugal								Part of Portugal					
(England) 1966	Part of Portugal								Part of Portugal					
(Mexico) 1970	Part of Portugal								Part of Portugal					
(West Germany) 1974	Part of Portugal								Part of Portugal					
(Argentina) 1978	Part of Portugal								Part of Portugal					
(Spain) 1982	Did not qualify								3	0	0	3	0	9
(Mexico) 1986	Did not qualify								6	2	0	4	4	15
(Italy) 1990	Did not enter								Did not enter					
(United States) 1994	Did not qualify								6	0	0	6	1	46
(France) 1998	Did not qualify								6	1	1	4	3	28
(South Korea) (Japan) 2002	Did not qualify								6	0	0	6	2	31
(Germany) 2006	Did not qualify								2	0	0	2	1	6
(South Africa) 2010	Did not qualify								2	0	0	2	2	13
(Brazil) 2014	Did not qualify								2	0	0	2	1	13
(Russia) 2018	Did not qualify								2	0	1	1	1	4
(Qatar) 2022	Did not qualify								2	1	0	1	1	3
(Canada) (Mexico) (United States) 2026	Did not qualify								2	0	1	1	1	5
(Morocco) (Portugal) (Spain) 2030	To be determined								To be determined					
(Saudi Arabia) 2034	To be determined								To be determined					
Total	–	0/11	–	–	–	–	–	–	39	4	3	32	17	173

=== AFC Asian Cup ===
AFC Asian Cup									AFC Asian Cup qualification					
Year	Result	Position	Pld	W	D*	L	GF	GA	Pld	W	D	L	GF	GA
(Hong Kong) 1956	Did not enter								Did not enter					
(South Korea) 1960	Did not enter								Did not enter					
(Israel) 1964	Did not enter								Did not enter					
(Iran) 1968	Did not enter								Did not enter					
(Thailand) 1972	Did not enter								Did not enter					
(Iran) 1976	Did not enter								Did not enter					
(Kuwait) 1980	Did not qualify								3	1	0	2	4	7
(Singapore) 1984	Did not enter								Did not enter					
(Qatar) 1988	Did not enter								Did not enter					
(Japan) 1992	Did not qualify								3	1	1	1	4	4
(United Arab Emirates) 1996	Did not qualify								3	1	0	2	7	12
(Lebanon) 2000	Did not qualify								3	1	0	2	1	4
(China) 2004	Did not qualify								2	0	0	2	0	5
(Indonesia) (Malaysia) (Thailand) (Vietnam) 2007	Did not enter								Did not enter					
(Qatar) 2011	Did not qualify								AFC Challenge Cup					
(Australia) 2015	Did not qualify								AFC Challenge Cup					
(United Arab Emirates) 2019	Did not qualify								8	0	1	7	5	20
(Qatar) 2023	Did not qualify								2	1	0	1	1	3
(Saudi Arabia) 2027	Did not qualify								4	0	1	3	1	9
Total	–	0/19	–	–	–	–	–	–	28	5	3	20	23	64

=== East Asian Cup record ===
East Asian Football Championship Finals									Preliminary competition						
Year	Result	Position	Pld	W	D*	L	GF	GA	Place	Pld	W	D	L	GF	GA
East Asian Football Championship
(Japan) 2003	Did not qualify								3rd	4	2	0	2	5	5
(South Korea) 2005	Did not enter								Did not enter						
(China) 2008	Did not qualify								4th	3	0	1	2	3	14
(Japan) 2010	Did not qualify								3rd	3	1	1	1	9	5
EAFF East Asian Cup
(South Korea) 2013	Did not qualify								2nd	2	1	0	1	5	4
(China) 2015	Did not qualify								2nd	3	1	1	1	4	4
EAFF E-1 Football Championship
(Japan) 2017	Did not qualify								3rd	3	1	1	1	7	6
(South Korea) 2019	Did not qualify								2nd	3	1	1	1	4	5
(Japan) 2022	Did not participate								Not held						
(South Korea) 2025	Did not qualify								2nd	1	0	0	1	1	2
Total	–	0/9	–	–	–	–	–	–	–	22	7	5	10	38	45

=== AFC Challenge Cup record ===
AFC Challenge Cup record									Qualification record					
Year	Result	Position	Pld	W	D*	L	GF	GA	Pld	W	D	L	GF	GA
(Bangladesh) 2006	Group stage	15th	3	0	1	2	2	8	No qualification					
(India) 2008	Did not qualify								2	0	0	2	3	6
(Sri Lanka) 2010	Did not qualify								5	1	0	4	4	12
(Nepal) 2012	Did not qualify								2	1	0	1	4	5
(Maldives) 2014	Did not qualify								3	0	0	3	0	6
Total	Group stage	1/5	3	0	1	2	2	8	12	2	0	9	11	29

=== AFC Solidarity Cup record ===
AFC Solidarity Cup
Year	Result	Position	Pld	W	D*	L	GF	GA
(Malaysia) 2016	Runners-up	2nd	5	2	2	1	8	5
2020	Cancelled							
Total	Runners-up	1/1	5	2	2	1	8	5

== Head-to-head record ==
As of 29 March 2026 after match against Tanzania

Opponents	First	Last	Pld	W	D	L	GF	GA	GD	Confederation
Aruba	2026	2026	1	0	0	1	1	4	−3	CONCACAF
Australia	1970	1970	1	0	0	1	0	9	−9	AFC
Bangladesh	2009	2009	1	0	0	1	0	3	−3	AFC
Bhutan	2023	2023	1	0	0	1	0	1	−1	AFC
Brunei	1985	2024	5	3	1	2	6	6	0	AFC
Cambodia	2008	2023	7	1	1	5	7	18	−11	AFC
China	1978	1999	6	0	0	6	3	26	−23	AFC
Chinese Taipei	1992	2025	12	1	1	10	12	38	−26	AFC
Guam	2003	2018	6	2	2	2	6	8	−2	AFC
Hong Kong	1982	2025	40	2	2	36	28	123	−95	AFC
India	2017	2017	2	0	0	2	1	6	−5	AFC
Iraq	2001	2001	2	0	0	2	0	13	−13	AFC
Japan	1980	2000	4	0	0	4	0	26	−26	AFC
Kazakhstan	2001	2001	2	0	0	2	0	8	−8	UEFA
North Korea	1980	2007	3	0	0	3	1	12	−11	AFC
South Korea	1949	1993	3	0	0	3	2	11	−9	AFC
Kuwait	1993	1993	2	0	0	2	1	18	−17	AFC
Kyrgyzstan	2013	2017	4	0	0	4	3	8	−5	AFC
Laos	2016	2017	2	2	0	0	7	2	+5	AFC
Malaysia	1993	2016	3	0	1	2	0	14	−14	AFC
Mauritius	2018	2018	1	0	0	1	0	1	−1	CAF
Mongolia	1993	2018	10	5	2	3	18	14	+4	AFC
Myanmar	2009	2023	8	0	1	7	4	26	−22	AFC
Nepal	1997	2016	6	1	1	4	7	16	−9	AFC
New Zealand	1975	1975	1	0	1	0	1	1	0	OFC
Northern Mariana Islands	2009	2018	5	3	1	1	16	6	+10	AFC
Oman	1997	1997	2	0	0	2	0	6	−6	AFC
Pakistan	2003	2013	3	0	1	2	2	7	−5	AFC
Panama	1975	1975	1	1	0	0	2	1	+1	CONCACAF
Philippines	1978	2012	5	2	0	3	7	14	−7	AFC
Saudi Arabia	1993	1993	2	0	0	2	0	14	−14	AFC
Singapore	2000	2023	4	0	1	3	2	6	−4	AFC
Solomon Islands	2018	2018	1	0	0	1	1	4	−3	OFC
Sri Lanka	2016	2019	3	1	1	1	2	4	−2	AFC
Tajikistan	2006	2013	2	0	0	2	0	7	−7	AFC
Thailand	2007	2007	3	0	0	3	2	15	−13	AFC
Tanzania	2026	2026	1	0	0	1	0	6	−6	CAF
Vietnam	2011	2011	2	0	0	2	1	13	−12	AFC

== Honours ==
=== Continental ===
- AFC Solidarity Cup
  - (silver) Runners-up (1): 2016

=== Summary ===
Competition	1st place, gold medalist(s)	2nd place, silver medalist(s)	3rd place, bronze medalist(s)	Total
AFC Solidarity Cup	0	1	0	1
Total	0	1	0	1
