= 2015 NorthEast United FC season =

2015 season of NorthEast United FC

NorthEast United
2015 season
- Chairman: John Abraham
- Head Coach: César Farías
- Stadium: Indira Gandhi Athletic Stadium
- ISL: 5th
- Top goalscorer: League: Nicolás Vélez (5); All: Nicolás Vélez (5)
- Highest home attendance: 30,319
- Lowest home attendance: 15,123
- Average home league attendance: 24,588
Home colours	Away colours	Third colours

The 2015 Season was NorthEast United's 2nd season in existence in the Indian Super League.

== Transfers ==
=== Pre-season ===
In: Note: Flags indicate national team as defined under FIFA eligibility rules; some limited exceptions apply. Players may hold more than one non-FIFA nationality.

No.	Pos.	Nation	Player
1	GK	FRA	Gennaro Bracigliano (from (India) Chennaiyin)
2	DF	IND	Aiborlang Khongjee (loan from (India) Shillong Lajong)
3	DF	IND	Marlangki Suting (loan from (India) Royal Wahingdoh)
4	DF	IND	Zohmingliana Ralte (loan from (India) Pune)
5	DF	FRA	Cédric Hengbart (from (France) Ajaccio)
6	DF	IND	Yumnam Raju (loan from (India) Pune)
7	MF	IND	Sanju Pradhan (from (India) Salgaocar)
8	MF	ESP	Bruno (from (India) Delhi Dynamos)
9	FW	IND	Holicharan Narzary (loan from (India) Dempo)
10	MF	POR	Silas (from (Portugal) Atlético)
11	MF	IND	Satiyasen Singh (loan from (India) Royal Wahingdoh)
12	DF	IND	Reagan Singh (loan from (India) Royal Wahingdoh)
13	GK	IND	Rehenesh TP (loan from (India) Shillong Lajong)
14	MF	IND	Boithang Haokip (loan from (India) Shillong Lajong)
15	DF	POR	Miguel Garcia (from (India) Sporting Goa)
17	MF	IND	Alen Deory (loan from (India) Shillong Lajong)
18	MF	ZAM	Kondwani Mtonga (loan from (Zambia) ZESCO United)
19	FW	ARG	Nicolás Vélez (from (Singapore) Warriors)
20	MF	POR	Simão
21	DF	IND	Robin Gurung (loan from (India) Shillong Lajong)
22	MF	IND	Siam Hanghal (loan from (India) Bengaluru)
23	FW	GHA	Francis Dadzie (from (Ghana) Bechem United)
27	FW	CIV	Boubacar Sanogo (from (United Arab Emirates) Al-Fujairah)
28	GK	IND	Lalthuammawia Ralte (loan from (India) Bengaluru)
38	DF	CMR	André Bikey (from (England) Charlton Athletic)
39	FW	SEN	Diomansy Kamara (from (Italy) Catanzaro)

Out: Note: Flags indicate national team as defined under FIFA eligibility rules; some limited exceptions apply. Players may hold more than one non-FIFA nationality.

No.	Pos.	Nation	Player
1	GK	GRE	Alexandros Tzorvas
3	DF	CZE	Tomáš Josl (to (Romania) Rapid București)
5	DF	SEN	Massamba Sambou (to (Cyprus) AEL Limassol)
6	MF	ZAM	Isaac Chansa (loan return to (India) Shillong Lajong)
7	MF	KOR	Do Dong-hyun
8	FW	COL	Luis Yanes
9	FW	ENG	James Keene (to (Sweden) Halmstad)
10	FW	ESP	Koke (to (Greece) Veria)
11	DF	ESP	Joan Capdevila (to (Belgium) Lierse)
14	FW	NZL	Leo Bertos (loan return to (India) East Bengal)
15	DF	POR	Miguel Garcia (to (India) Sporting Goa)
19	MF	BRA	Guilherme Batata (loan return to (Brazil) Atlético Paranaense)
20	MF	IND	Milan Singh (loan return to (India) Shillong Lajong)
21	MF	IND	Redeem Tlang (loan return to (India) Shillong Lajong)
23	FW	IND	Seminlen Doungel (loan return to (India) Shillong Lajong)
25	FW	IND	Durga Boro (loan return to (India) Shillong Lajong)
26	MF	IND	David Ngaihte (loan return to (India) Shillong Lajong)
—	FW	TTO	Cornell Glen

=== During the season ===
In: Note: Flags indicate national team as defined under FIFA eligibility rules; some limited exceptions apply. Players may hold more than one non-FIFA nationality.

No.	Pos.	Nation	Player
44	DF	ARG	Carlos Javier López (from (Venezuela) Deportivo Táchira)
77	FW	SEN	Victor Mendy

Out: Note: Flags indicate national team as defined under FIFA eligibility rules; some limited exceptions apply. Players may hold more than one non-FIFA nationality.

No.	Pos.	Nation	Player
15	DF	POR	Miguel Garcia
18	MF	ZAM	Kondwani Mtonga (loan return to (Zambia) ZESCO United)
27	FW	CIV	Boubacar Sanogo

== Squad ==
Note: Flags indicate national team as defined under FIFA eligibility rules; some limited exceptions apply. Players may hold more than one non-FIFA nationality.

No.	Pos.	Nation	Player
1	GK	FRA	Gennaro Bracigliano
2	DF	IND	Aiborlang Khongjee (on loan from Shillong Lajong)
3	MF	IND	Marlangki Suting (on loan from Royal Wahingdoh)
4	DF	IND	Zohmingliana Ralte (on loan from Pune)
5	DF	FRA	Cédric Hengbart
6	DF	IND	Yumnam Raju (on loan from Pune)
7	MF	IND	Sanju Pradhan
8	MF	ESP	Bruno
9	FW	IND	Holicharan Narzary (on loan from Dempo)
10	MF	POR	Silas
11	MF	IND	Seityasen Singh (on loan from Royal Wahingdoh)
12	DF	IND	Reagan Singh (on loan from Royal Wahingdoh)
13	GK	IND	Rehenesh TP (on loan from Shillong Lajong)

No.	Pos.	Nation	Player
14	MF	IND	Boithang Haokip (on loan from Shillong Lajong)
17	MF	IND	Alen Deory
19	FW	ARG	Nicolás Vélez
20	MF	POR	Simão Sabrosa
21	DF	IND	Robin Gurung (on loan from Shillong Lajong)
22	MF	IND	Siam Hanghal (on loan from Bengaluru FC)
23	FW	GHA	Francis Dadzie
28	GK	IND	Lalthuammawia Ralte (on loan from Bengaluru FC)
38	DF	CMR	André Bikey
39	FW	SEN	Diomansy Kamara
44	DF	ARG	Carlos Javier López
77	FW	SEN	Victor Mendy

=== Injured ===
Note: Flags indicate national team as defined under FIFA eligibility rules; some limited exceptions apply. Players may hold more than one non-FIFA nationality.

No.	Pos.	Nation	Player
15	DF	POR	Miguel Garcia
18	MF	ZAM	Kondwani Mtonga
27	FW	CIV	Boubacar Sanogo

=== Technical staff ===
Position	Name
Manager	(Venezuela) César Farías
Assistant manager	(Venezuela) Guillermo Sánchez
Assistant coach	(India) Santosh Kashyap
Goalkeeping coach	(France) Gennaro Bracigliano
Technical director	(England) Simon Festinesi (France) Bruno Satin
Head physiotherapist	(India) Tanveer Siddiqui
Physiotherapist	(India) Utsav Shah

== Indian Super League ==
=== League table ===
Pos	Team	Pld	W	D	L	GF	GA	GD	Pts	Qualification or relegation
3	Chennaiyin (C)	14	7	1	6	25	15	+10	22	Advance to ISL Play-offs
4	Delhi Dynamos	14	6	4	4	18	20	−2	22	Advance to ISL Play-offs
5	NorthEast United	14	6	2	6	18	23	−5	20	
6	Mumbai City	14	4	4	6	16	26	−10	16	
7	Pune City	14	4	3	7	17	23	−6	15	

Source: Indian Super League standings
Rules for classification: 1) points; 2) goal difference; 3) number of goals scored.
(C) Champions

=== Results summary ===
Overall								Home						Away					
Pld	W	D	L	GF	GA	GD	Pts	W	D	L	GF	GA	GD	W	D	L	GF	GA	GD
14	6	2	6	16	23	−7	20	4	0	3	9	11	−2	2	2	3	7	12	−5

Last updated: 3 December 2015.
Source: Matches

=== Results by round ===
Round	1	2	3	4	5	6	7	8	9	10	11	12	13	14
Ground	A	A	H	H	H	A	A	A	A	H	H	A	H	H
Result	L	L	L	W	W	L	D	W	W	L	W	D	L	W

Updated to match(es) played on 3 December 2015. Source: Matches
A = Away; H = Home; W = Win; D = Draw; L = Loss

=== Matches ===
6 October 2015 1	Kerala Blasters	3 – 1	NorthEast United	Kochi
19:00 IST (UTC+5:30)	Carvalho (yellow card) 37'; Josu 49'; Rafi 68'; Watt 71'; Bywater (yellow card) 90+7'	Report	Hanghal (yellow card) 21'; Pradhan (yellow card) 54'; Vélez 82'; Silas (yellow card) 83'	Stadium: Jawaharlal Nehru Stadium; Referee: Coimbatore Ramaswamy Srikrishna

9 October 2015 2	Pune City	1 – 0	NorthEast United	Pune
19:00 IST (UTC+5:30)	Maithani (yellow card) 16'; Ralte 73' (o.g.)	Report	Silas (yellow card) 14'	Stadium: Shree Shiv Chhatrapati Sports Complex; Referee: Matthew Conger

15 October 2015 3	NorthEast United	1 – 3	Goa	Guwahati
19:00 IST (UTC+5:30)	Hanghal (yellow card) 6'; Dadzie 12'; Kamara (yellow card) 33'; Gurung (yellow card) 90'	Report	Jonatan 28'; Reinaldo 30' (yellow card) 38'; Singh (yellow card) 64'; Desai 70'	Stadium: Indira Gandhi Athletic Stadium

20 October 2015 4	NorthEast United	2 – 0	Chennaiyin	Guwahati
19:00 IST (UTC+5:30)	Kamara (yellow card) 43'; Bikey (yellow card) 77'; Simão (yellow card) 83' (goal) 90+1' (pen.); Vélez (yellow card) 90+2' (goal) 90+2'	Report	Blasi (yellow card) 28'; Potenza (yellow card) 38'; Khabra (yellow card) 40' (red card) 40'; Mendy (yellow card) 45+1'; Teferra (yellow card) 45+6'; Wadoo (yellow card) 83'; Elano (yellow card) 90'	Stadium: Indira Gandhi Athletic Stadium

23 October 2015 5	NorthEast United	1 – 0	Atlético de Kolkata	Guwahati
19:00 IST (UTC+5:30)	Vélez 77'	Report	Anto (yellow card) 22'; Nato (yellow card) 68'; Mondal (yellow card) 90'	Stadium: Indira Gandhi Athletic Stadium

28 October 2015 6	Mumbai City	5 – 1	NorthEast United	Mumbai
19:00 IST (UTC+5:30)	Chhetri 25' (pen.), 40', 48' (pen.); Norde 51'; Pal (yellow card) 57'; Mehta (yellow card) 74'; Bertin 86'	Report	Haokip 29'; Bikey (yellow card) 43'	Stadium: DY Patil Stadium

3 November 2015 7	Delhi Dynamos	1 – 1	NorthEast United	Delhi
19:00 IST (UTC+5:30)	R.Singh (yellow card) 23'; Gadze 37' (yellow card) 63'; S.Singh (yellow card) 81'	Report	Raju (yellow card) 45'; López (yellow card) 50'; Simão 72'; Pradhan (yellow card) 75'; Bruno (yellow card) 84'	Stadium: Jawaharlal Nehru Stadium

7 November 2015 8	Atlético de Kolkata	0 – 1	NorthEast United	Kolkata
19:00 IST		Report	Simao 9' (pen.); Carlos (yellow card) 20'; Bruno (yellow card) 74'; Raju (yellow card) 81'; Silas (yellow card) 83'	Stadium: Salt Lake Stadium; Attendance: 38,456; Referee: D.J. Ganter

11 November 2015 9	Chennaiyin	1 – 2	NorthEast United	Chennai
19:00 IST (UTC+5:30)	Mundampara (yellow card) 23'; Elano 33'; T.Singh (yellow card) 74'; Das (yellow card) 90+1'	Report	López (yellow card) 20'; Kamara 44' (yellow card) 77'; Silas 72'	Stadium: Jawaharlal Nehru Stadium

15 November 2015 10	NorthEast United	1 – 4	Kerala Blasters	Guwahati
19:00 IST (UTC+5:30)	López (yellow card) 40'; Hanghal (yellow card) 59'; Vélez 90+1'	Report	Dagnall 1', 76' (yellow card) 59'; Lobo 21'; Bywater (yellow card) 28'; Ramage (yellow card) 31'; Dey (yellow card) 45+3'; German 75'	Stadium: Indira Gandhi Athletic Stadium

20 November 2015 11	NorthEast United	2 – 0	Mumbai City	Guwahati
19:00 IST (UTC+5:30)	Bruno 41' (pen.); Raju (yellow card) 65'; Kamara 85' (yellow card) 85'	Report	Rodrigues (yellow card) 39'; Bustos (yellow card) 71'	Stadium: Indira Gandhi Athletic Stadium

25 November 2015 12	Goa	1 – 1	NorthEast United	Goa
19:00 IST (UTC+5:30)	Arnolin (yellow card) 49'; Omagbemi (yellow card) 73'; Reinaldo 80'	Report	Mendy 55'	Stadium: Fatorda Stadium

28 November 2015 13	NorthEast United	1 – 2	Delhi Dynamos	Guwahati
19:00 IST (UTC+5:30)	Sa.Singh 37'; Re.Singh (yellow card) 39'; Kamara (yellow card) 44'	Report	Chicão (yellow card) 14'; Ro.Singh 30' (yellow card) 54'; Se.Singh (yellow card) 44'; Vinícius (yellow card) 50'; Gadze (yellow card) 52'; Marmentini 88' (yellow card) 90+2'	Stadium: Indira Gandhi Athletic Stadium

2 December 2015 14	NorthEast United	3 – 2	Pune City	Guwahati
19:00 IST (UTC+5:30)	Vélez 4'; Kamara 18' (yellow card) 90+5'; López (yellow card) 28'; Bikey 43' (yellow card) 61'; S.Singh (yellow card) 63'; Bruno (yellow card) 74'	Report	Bailey 8'; G.Singh (yellow card) 43'; Zokora (yellow card) 77'; Mutu 86'	Stadium: Indira Gandhi Athletic Stadium

== Squad statistics ==
As of Match played 2 December 2015

=== Appearances and goals ===
No.	Pos	Nat	Player	Total		Indian Super League	
No.	Pos	Nat	Player	Apps	Goals	Apps	Goals
1	GK	(France) FRA	Gennaro Bracigliano	2	0	2	0
2	DF	(India) IND	Aiborlang Khongjee	8	0	8	0
3	DF	(India) IND	Marlangki Suting	1	0	0+1	0
4	DF	(India) IND	Zohmingliana Ralte	2	0	2	0
5	DF	(France) FRA	Cédric Hengbart	12	0	11+1	0
6	DF	(India) IND	Yumnam Raju	10	0	9+1	0
7	MF	(India) IND	Sanju Pradhan	11	0	5+6	0
8	MF	(Spain) ESP	Bruno	12	1	8+4	1
9	FW	(India) IND	Holicharan Narzary	3	0	1+2	0
10	MF	(Portugal) POR	Silas	12	1	10+2	1
11	MF	(India) IND	Satiyasen Singh	6	1	6	1
12	DF	(India) IND	Reagan Singh	11	0	9+2	0
13	GK	(India) IND	Rehenesh TP	12	0	12	0
14	MF	(India) IND	Boithang Haokip	5	1	3+2	1
17	MF	(India) IND	Alen Deory	2	0	1+1	0
19	FW	(Argentina) ARG	Nicolás Vélez	14	5	7+7	5
20	MF	(Portugal) POR	Simão	10	3	6+4	3
21	DF	(India) IND	Robin Gurung	5	0	3+2	0
22	MF	(India) IND	Siam Hanghal	12	0	11+1	0
23	FW	(Ghana) GHA	Francis Dadzie	11	1	8+3	1
38	DF	(Cameroon) CMR	André Bikey	9	1	9	1
39	FW	(Senegal) SEN	Diomansy Kamara	12	3	10+2	3
44	DF	(Argentina) ARG	Carlos Javier López	9	0	9	0
77	FW	(Senegal) SEN	Victor Mendy	4	1	3+1	1
Players who left NorthEast United due to injury during the season:
15	DF	(Portugal) POR	Miguel Garcia	1	0	1	0
18	MF	(Zambia) ZAM	Kondwani Mtonga	0	0	0	0
27	FW	(Ivory Coast) CIV	Boubacar Sanogo	0	0	0	0

=== Goal scorers ===
Place	Position	Nation	Number	Name	Indian Super League	Total
1	FW	(Argentina)	19	Nicolás Vélez	5	5
2	MF	(Portugal)	20	Simão	3	3
2	FW	(Senegal)	39	Diomansy Kamara	3	3
5	FW	(Ghana)	23	Francis Dadzie	1	1
5	MF	(India)	14	Boithang Haokip	1	1
5	MF	(Portugal)	10	Silas	1	1
5	MF	(Spain)	8	Bruno	1	1
5	FW	(Senegal)	77	Victor Mendy	1	1
5	MF	(India)	11	Satiyasen Singh	1	1
5	DF	(Senegal)	38	André Bikey	1	1
				TOTALS	17	17

=== Disciplinary record ===
Number	Nation	Position	Name	Indian Super League		Total	
Number	Nation	Position	Name	Yellow card	Red card	Yellow card	Red card
6	(India)	MF	Yumnam Raju	3	0	3	0
7	(India)	MF	Sanju Pradhan	2	0	2	0
8	(Spain)	MF	Bruno	3	0	3	0
10	(Portugal)	MF	Silas	3	0	3	0
11	(India)	MF	Satiyasen Singh	1	0	1	0
12	(India)	DF	Reagan Singh	1	0	1	0
19	(Argentina)	FW	Nicolás Vélez	1	0	1	0
20	(Portugal)	MF	Simão	1	0	1	0
21	(India)	DF	Robin Gurung	1	0	1	0
22	(India)	MF	Siam Hanghal	3	0	3	0
38	(Cameroon)	DF	André Bikey	3	0	3	0
39	(Senegal)	FW	Diomansy Kamara	6	0	6	0
44	(Argentina)	DF	Carlos Javier López	5	0	5	0
			TOTALS	33	0	33	0
