= 2014 NorthEast United FC season =

2014 season of NorthEast United FC

NorthEast United
2014 season
- Manager: Ricki Herbert
- Stadium: Indira Gandhi Athletic Stadium
- ISL: 8th
- Top goalscorer: Koke (4)
- Highest home attendance: 30,870 (vs Goa, 19 October 2014)
- Lowest home attendance: 25,530 (vs Atlético Kolkata, 16 October 2014)
- Average home league attendance: 28,633
| Home colours | Away colours |

The 2014 Season was NorthEast United's 1st season in existence in the Indian Super League.

== Background ==
In early 2014 it was announced that the All India Football Federation, the national federation for football in India, and IMG-Reliance would be accepting bids for ownership of eight of nine selected cities for the upcoming Indian Super League, an eight-team franchise league modeled along the lines of the Indian Premier League cricket tournament. On 13 April 2014, it was announced that John Abraham and I-league side Shillong Lajong F.C. had won the bidding for the Guwahati-based franchise.

On 15 August 2014, during an official launch, it was announced that the name of the team would be NorthEast United FC representing the 8 north-eastern states of India. The first match for NorthEast United FC in Indian Super League was played against Kerala Blasters on 13 October 2014 at Indira Gandhi Athletic Stadium in Guwahati which was won 1–0.

== Transfer ==
=== Foreign signings ===
| # | Position: | Player | Last club | Date | Source |
|---|---|---|---|---|---|
| 1 | GK | (Greece) Alexandros Tzorvas | (Greece) Apollon Smyrnis | 1 September 2014 | |
| 4 | MF | (Zambia) Kondwani Mtonga | (Zambia) ZESCO United | 2 September 2014 | |
| 9 | FW | (England) James Keene | (Israel) Bnei Yehuda Tel Aviv | 12 September 2014 | |
| 10 | FW | (Spain) Koke | (Bolivia) Blooming | 15 September 2014 | |
| 11 | DF | (Spain) Joan Capdevila | (Spain) Espanyol | 16 July 2014 | |
| 14 | MF | (New Zealand) Leo Bertos | (India) East Bengal | 6 October 2015 | |
| 15 | DF | (Portugal) Miguel Garcia | (Spain) Mallorca | 2 September 2014 | |

=== Drafted domestic players ===
| Round | Position | Player | I-League club |
|---|---|---|---|
| 1 | GK | (India) Kunzang Bhutia | Shillong Lajong |
| 2 | DF | (India) Jibon Singh | Shillong Lajong |
| 3 | FW | (India) Durga Boro | Shillong Lajong |
| 4 | DF | (India) Aiborlang Khongjee | Shillong Lajong |
| 5 | DF | (India) Zodingliana Ralte | Shillong Lajong |
| 6 | GK | (India) Rehenesh Paramba | Shillong Lajong |
| 7 | MF | (India) Boithang Haokip | Shillong Lajong |
| 8 | DF | (India) Pritam Kumar Singh | Shillong Lajong |
| 9 | MF | (India) Milan Singh | Shillong Lajong |
| 10 | DF | (India) Robin Gurung | Shillong Lajong |
| 11 | MF | (India) Alen Deory | Shillong Lajong |
| 12 | MF | (India) Redeem Tlang | Shillong Lajong |
| 13 | FW | (India) Seminlen Doungel | Shillong Lajong |
| 14 | MF | (India) David Ngaihte | Shillong Lajong |

=== Drafted foreign players ===
| Round | Position | Player | Last Club |
|---|---|---|---|
| 1 | MF | (Zambia) Isaac Chansa | (India) Shillong Lajong |
| 2 | FW | (Trinidad and Tobago) Cornell Glen | (India) Shillong Lajong |
| 3 | DF | (Senegal) Massamba Sambou | (France) Châteauroux |
| 4 | FW | (South Korea) Do Dong-hyun | (Japan) Gifu |
| 5 | MF | (Brazil) Guilherme Batata | (Brazil) Atlético Paranaense |
| 6 | DF | (Czech Republic) Tomáš Josl | (Czech Republic) Vysočina Jihlava |
| 7 | FW | (Colombia) Luis Yanes | (Colombia) Atlético Bucaramanga |

== Players and staff ==
=== Squad ===
Note: Flags indicate national team as defined under FIFA eligibility rules; some limited exceptions apply. Players may hold more than one non-FIFA nationality.

| No. | Pos. | Nation | Player |
|---|---|---|---|
| 1 | GK | GRE | Alexandros Tzorvas |
| 2 | DF | IND | Aiborlang Khongjee |
| 3 | DF | CZE | Tomáš Josl |
| 4 | MF | ZAM | Kondwani Mtonga |
| 5 | DF | SEN | Massamba Sambou |
| 6 | MF | ZAM | Isaac Chansa |
| 7 | MF | KOR | Do Dong-hyun |
| 8 | FW | COL | Luis Yanes |
| 9 | FW | ENG | James Keene |
| 10 | FW | ESP | Koke |
| 11 | DF | ESP | Joan Capdevila |
| 13 | GK | IND | Rehnesh TP |
| 14 | FW | NZL | Leo Bertos |
| 15 | DF | POR | Miguel Garcia (Captain) |

| No. | Pos. | Nation | Player |
|---|---|---|---|
| 16 | DF | IND | Robin Gurung |
| 17 | MF | IND | Zodingliana Ralte |
| 18 | DF | IND | Jibon Singh |
| 19 | MF | BRA | Guilherme Batata |
| 20 | MF | IND | Milan Singh |
| 21 | MF | IND | Redeem Tlang |
| 22 | MF | IND | Boithang Haokip |
| 23 | FW | IND | Seminlen Doungel |
| 24 | MF | IND | Alen Deory |
| 25 | FW | IND | Durga Boro |
| 26 | MF | IND | David Ngaihte |
| 27 | GK | IND | Kunzang Bhutia |
| 30 | DF | IND | Pritam Kumar Singh |
| — | FW | TTO | Cornell Glen |

=== Technical staff ===
| Position | Name |
|---|---|
| Manager | (New Zealand) Ricki Herbert |
| Coach | (India) Thangboi Singto |
| Performance Coach | (England) Lee Taylor |

== Indian Super League ==
=== League table ===
| Pos | Team | Pld | W | D | L | GF | GA | GD | Pts |
|---|---|---|---|---|---|---|---|---|---|
| 5 | Delhi Dynamos | 14 | 4 | 6 | 4 | 16 | 14 | +2 | 18 |
| 6 | Pune City | 14 | 4 | 4 | 6 | 12 | 17 | −5 | 16 |
| 7 | Mumbai City | 14 | 4 | 4 | 6 | 12 | 21 | −9 | 16 |
| 8 | NorthEast United | 14 | 3 | 6 | 5 | 11 | 13 | −2 | 15 |

Source: Soccerway
Rules for classification: 1) points; 2) goal difference; 3) number of goals scored

=== Results summary ===
| Overall | | | | | | | | Home | | | | | | Away | | | | | |
| Pld | W | D | L | GF | GA | GD | Pts | W | D | L | GF | GA | GD | W | D | L | GF | GA | GD |
|---|---|---|---|---|---|---|---|---|---|---|---|---|---|---|---|---|---|---|---|
| 14 | 3 | 6 | 5 | 11 | 13 | −2 | 15 | 2 | 3 | 2 | 7 | 6 | +1 | 1 | 3 | 3 | 4 | 7 | −3 |

Last updated: 28 August 2015.
Source: Matches

=== Results by round ===
| Round | 1 | 2 | 3 | 4 | 5 | 6 | 7 | 8 | 9 | 10 | 11 | 12 | 13 | 14 |
|---|---|---|---|---|---|---|---|---|---|---|---|---|---|---|
| Ground | H | H | H | A | A | A | A | H | A | H | H | A | A | H |
| Result | W | L | D | W | D | L | D | D | L | L | W | L | D | D |

Source: Matches
A = Away; H = Home; W = Win; D = Draw; L = Loss

=== Matches ===
| 13 October 2014 1 | NorthEast United | 1 – 0 | Kerala Blasters | Guwahati |
| 19:00 IST (UTC+5:30) | Koke 45' | Report | McAllister (yellow card) 44' | Stadium: Indira Gandhi Athletic Stadium; Referee: Pratap Singh |

| 16 October 2014 7 | NorthEast United | 0 – 2 | Atlético de Kolkata | Guwahati |
| 19:00 IST (UTC+5:30) | | Report | Teferra 15'; Borja (yellow card) 54' (yellow-red card) 84'; Podaný 90+2' | Stadium: Indira Gandhi Athletic Stadium; Referee: Tejas Nagvenkar |

| 19 October 2014 2 | NorthEast United | 1 – 1 | Goa | Guwahati |
| 19:00 IST (UTC+5:30) | Chansa (yellow card) 16'; Koke 36' (pen.); Do (yellow card) 82' | Report | Grégory 17' | Stadium: Indira Gandhi Athletic Stadium; Referee: David Gantar |

| 24 October 2014 3 | Mumbai City | 0 – 2 | NorthEast United | Mumbai |
| 19:00 IST (UTC+5:30) | Letzelter (yellow card) 45+2'; Čmovš (yellow card) 52' (yellow-red card) 75' | Report | Mtonga 57'; Batata 90+2' | Stadium: DY Patil Stadium; Referee: David Gantar |

| 29 October 2014 4 | Delhi Dynamos | 0 – 0 | NorthEast United | Delhi |
| 19:00 IST (UTC+5:30) | | Report | Josl (yellow card) 42'; Garcia (yellow card) 64'; Batata (yellow card) 66' | Stadium: Jawaharlal Nehru Stadium; Referee: Pratap Singh |

| 3 November 2014 5 | Pune City | 1 – 0 | NorthEast United | Pune |
| 19:00 IST (UTC+5:30) | Kotal (yellow card) 47'; Goossens 88' | Report | Yanes (yellow card) 90+5' | Stadium: Shree Shiv Chhatrapati Sports Complex; Referee: Muringothumalil Bhaskaran Santosh Kumar |

| 8 November 2014 11 | Chennaiyin | 2 – 2 | NorthEast United | Chennai |
| 19:00 IST (UTC+5:30) | Elano 25', 78' (yellow card) 84' | Report | Doungel 38'; Batata (yellow card) 52'; Khongjee (yellow card) 84'; Koke 85' | Stadium: Jawaharlal Nehru Stadium; Referee: Pratap Singh |

| 15 November 2014 8 | NorthEast United | 0 – 0 | Pune City | Guwahati |
| 19:00 IST (UTC+5:30) | Gurung (yellow card) 90+3' | Report | Katsouranis (yellow card) 31' | Stadium: Indira Gandhi Athletic Stadium; Referee: Pranjal Banerji |

| 18 November 2014 9 | Atlético de Kolkata | 1 – 0 | NorthEast United | Kolkata |
| 19:00 IST (UTC+5:30) | García 51' | Report | Paramba (yellow card) 11'; Sambou (yellow card) 37'; Khongjee (yellow card) 64' | Stadium: Salt Lake Stadium; Referee: Muringothumalil Bhaskaran Santosh Kumar |

| 24 November 2014 14 | NorthEast United | 1 – 2 | Delhi Dynamos | Guwahati |
| 19:00 IST (UTC+5:30) | Gurung (yellow card) 27'; Khongjee (yellow card) 59' (yellow-red card) 83'; Keene (yellow card) 70'; Mtonga 80' | Report | Marmentini 6'; Mulder 14'; Chakraborty (yellow card) 34' (yellow-red card) 45+1' | Stadium: Indira Gandhi Athletic Stadium; Referee: Ravshan Irmatov |

| 27 November 2014 6 | NorthEast United | 3 – 0 | Chennaiyin | Guwahati |
| 19:00 IST (UTC+5:30) | Boro 10'; Sambou 21', 23'; Capdevila (yellow card) 45+1' (yellow-red card) 72'; Batata (yellow card) 67' | Report | Djemba-Djemba (yellow card) 23'; Singh (yellow card) 45+3'; Mendy (yellow card) 79' | Stadium: Indira Gandhi Athletic Stadium; Referee: Hettikankanamge Chrishantha Dilan Perera |

| 1 December 2014 12 | Goa | 3 – 0 | NorthEast United | Goa |
| 19:00 IST (UTC+5:30) | Fernandes 34'; Slepička 45+1' (yellow card) 45+1'; Santos 74'; Das (yellow card) 79'; Roy (yellow card) 90+6' | Report | Sambou (yellow card) 36' | Stadium: Fatorda Stadium; Referee: Muringothumalil Bhaskaran Santosh Kumar |

| 4 December 2014 13 | Kerala Blasters | 0 – 0 | NorthEast United | Kochi |
| 19:00 IST (UTC+5:30) | Hossain (yellow card) 29'; Hume (yellow card) 45+3'; Chopra (yellow card) 75' | Report | Doungel (yellow card) 16'; Batata (yellow card) 72'; Keene (red card) 75' | Stadium: Jawaharlal Nehru Stadium; Referee: Anthony Simoes |

| 10 December 2014 10 | NorthEast United | 1 – 1 | Mumbai City | Guwahati |
| 19:00 IST (UTC+5:30) | Koke 34' (pen.) | Report | Ribeiro (yellow card) 8'; Čmovš (yellow card) 10'; Mondal (yellow card) 33'; Štohanzl (yellow card) 76'; Singh 84' | Stadium: Indira Gandhi Athletic Stadium; Referee: Ranjit Bakshi |

== Squad statistics ==
As of Match played 10 December 2014

=== Appearances and goals ===
| No. | Pos | Nat | Player | Total | | Indian Super League | |
| No. | Pos | Nat | Player | Apps | Goals | Apps | Goals |
|---|---|---|---|---|---|---|---|
| 1 | GK | (Greece) GRE | Alexandros Tzorvas | 2 | 0 | 2 | 0 |
| 2 | DF | (India) IND | Aiborlang Khongjee | 13 | 0 | 13 | 0 |
| 3 | DF | (Czech Republic) CZE | Tomáš Josl | 6 | 0 | 2+4 | 0 |
| 4 | MF | (Zambia) ZAM | Kondwani Mtonga | 13 | 2 | 13 | 2 |
| 5 | DF | (Senegal) SEN | Massamba Sambou | 6 | 2 | 6 | 2 |
| 6 | MF | (Zambia) ZAM | Isaac Chansa | 8 | 0 | 5+3 | 0 |
| 7 | MF | (South Korea) KOR | Do Dong-hyun | 8 | 0 | 4+4 | 0 |
| 8 | FW | (Colombia) COL | Luis Yanes | 6 | 0 | 0+6 | 0 |
| 9 | FW | (England) ENG | James Keene | 10 | 0 | 6+4 | 0 |
| 10 | FW | (Spain) ESP | Koke | 12 | 4 | 12 | 4 |
| 11 | DF | (Spain) ESP | Joan Capdevila | 12 | 0 | 12 | 0 |
| 13 | GK | (India) IND | Rehenesh Paramba | 12 | 0 | 12 | 0 |
| 14 | FW | (New Zealand) NZL | Leo Bertos | 4 | 0 | 0+4 | 0 |
| 15 | DF | (Portugal) POR | Miguel Garcia | 13 | 0 | 13 | 0 |
| 16 | DF | (India) IND | Robin Gurung | 11 | 0 | 11 | 0 |
| 17 | MF | (India) IND | Zodingliana Ralte | 10 | 0 | 9+1 | 0 |
| 19 | MF | (Brazil) BRA | Guilherme Batata | 10 | 1 | 9+1 | 1 |
| 20 | MF | (India) IND | Milan Singh | 5 | 0 | 2+3 | 0 |
| 21 | MF | (India) IND | Redeem Tlang | 1 | 0 | 0+1 | 0 |
| 22 | MF | (India) IND | Boithang Haokip | 7 | 0 | 4+3 | 0 |
| 23 | FW | (India) IND | Seminlen Doungel | 9 | 1 | 5+4 | 1 |
| 24 | MF | (India) IND | Alen Deory | 5 | 0 | 2+3 | 0 |
| 25 | FW | (India) IND | Durga Boro | 11 | 1 | 11 | 1 |
| 26 | MF | (India) IND | David Ngaihte | 2 | 0 | 1+1 | 0 |

=== Goal scorers ===
| Place | Position | Nation | Number | Name | Indian Super League | Total |
|---|---|---|---|---|---|---|
| 1 | FW | (Spain) | 10 | Koke | 4 | 4 |
| 2 | MF | (Zambia) | 4 | Kondwani Mtonga | 2 | 2 |
| 2 | DF | (Senegal) | 5 | Massamba Sambou | 2 | 2 |
| 4 | MF | (Brazil) | 19 | Guilherme Batata | 1 | 1 |
| 4 | FW | (India) | 23 | Seminlen Doungel | 1 | 1 |
| 4 | FW | (India) | 25 | Durga Boro | 1 | 1 |
| | | | | TOTALS | 11 | 11 |

=== Disciplinary record ===
| Number | Nation | Position | Name | Indian Super League | | Total | |
| Number | Nation | Position | Name | Yellow card | Red card | Yellow card | Red card |
| 2 | (India) | DF | Aiborlang Khongjee | 4 | 1 | 4 | 1 |
| 3 | (Czech Republic) | DF | Tomáš Josl | 1 | 0 | 1 | 0 |
| 5 | (Senegal) | DF | Massamba Sambou | 2 | 0 | 2 | 0 |
| 6 | (Zambia) | MF | Isaac Chansa | 1 | 0 | 1 | 0 |
| 7 | (South Korea) | MF | Do Dong-hyun | 1 | 0 | 1 | 0 |
| 8 | (Colombia) | FW | Luis Yanes | 1 | 0 | 1 | 0 |
| 9 | (England) | FW | James Keene | 1 | 1 | 1 | 1 |
| 11 | (Spain) | DF | Joan Capdevila | 2 | 1 | 2 | 1 |
| 13 | (India) | GK | Rehenesh Paramba | 1 | 0 | 1 | 0 |
| 15 | (Portugal) | DF | Miguel Garcia | 1 | 0 | 1 | 0 |
| 16 | (India) | DF | Robin Gurung | 2 | 0 | 2 | 0 |
| 19 | (Brazil) | MF | Guilherme Batata | 4 | 0 | 4 | 0 |
| 23 | (India) | FW | Seminlen Doungel | 1 | 0 | 1 | 0 |
| | | | TOTALS | 22 | 3 | 22 | 3 |

== See also ==
List of NorthEast United FC seasons
