= Ka I 21–18 Hang Sai =

2019 Taça de Macau Match No. 2
- Event: 2019 Taça de Macau
Ka I	Hang Sai
21	18
- Date: 16 June 2019
- Venue: Lin Fong Stadium, Macau
- Referee: 'Grant'

Ka I 21–18 Hang Sai was a football match held on 16 June 2019 involving two teams in Macau. The fixture was part of the 2019 Taça de Macau. Players of both Ka I and Hang Sai decided to use the competitive match as a means of protest against the Macau Football Association for its role in the withdrawal of the Macau national team from the 2022 FIFA World Cup qualifiers.

== Background ==
The tie between Kai I and Hang Sai in the 2019 Taça de Macau were held on 16 June 2019 after the Macau Football Association (MFA) decided to withdraw its national team from the 2022 FIFA World Cup qualifiers. The result of the match up between the two Macanese clubs were a protest against the federation's decision. The match was a playoff in order to determined which among the two clubs would advance to the quarterfinal of the cup tournament.

Macau entered the 2022 FIFA World Cup qualifiers in the first round of the Asian qualifiers and had to best Sri Lanka in a home-and-away playoff. Macau won 1–0 over Sri Lanka in the first tie. The second match was to be held away in Sri Lanka but the MFA decided against sending a team citing security concerns following the 2019 Sri Lanka Easter bombings. Macau national team players have appealed the decision and were willing to waive the federation responsibility over their safety so they could play their second qualifier match in Sri Lanka but this request has been denied.

The MFA requested the Football Federation of Sri Lanka to have the match played in a neutral venue but the proposal was denied with the Sri Lankan federation insisting that adequate security measures were adopted for the then-scheduled match.

2022 FIFA World Cup qualification – AFC first round matches involving Macau and Sri Lanka

6 June 2019
19:30 UTC+8

Macau	1–0	Sri Lanka
Duarte 52'	Report (AFC)

Zhuhai Sports Center Stadium, Zhuhai (China) (Note: Macau played their home match against Sri Lanka in Zhuhai, China, due to ongoing maintenance of Estádio Campo Desportivo.)
Attendance: 901
Referee: Kim Dae-yong (South Korea)
11 June 2019
15:30 UTC+5:30

Sri Lanka	Cancelled (Note: Macau did not send their team for the second leg due to safety reasons following the 2019 Sri Lanka Easter bombings. The AFC referred the matter to FIFA, and FIFA announced on 27 June 2019 that the match was declared a 3–0 forfeit victory to Sri Lanka, and consequently qualifying Sri Lanka to the second round.)	Macau
	Report (AFC)

Sugathadasa Stadium, Colombo
Referee: Çarymyrat Kurbanow (Turkmenistan)

The last competitive match between Ka I and Hang Sai prior to their 2019 Taça de Macau match was in the 2019 Liga de Elite. Hang Sai won 2–0 in that match.

== Match details ==
Both Ka I and Hang Sai players scored unchallenged, with Hang Sai goalkeeper Ho Chi Hou being one of the goalscorers of the Taça de Macau match. Hang Sai player Lam Ka Chong scored the first goal in the 4th minute. By half-time the scoreline was 6–5 in favor of Ka I. and the scoreboard at the stadium stopped working when the scoreline reached 21–17. The match reportedly ended prematurely by officials who determined that players from both clubs were not playing a competitive game. The result of the match was officially recorded as a 21–18 win for Ka I over Hang Sai.

16 June 2019
14:00 UTC+8

Ka I	21–18	Hang Sai
Thiago Fernandes 7', 11'; Josecler 16', 56', 59', 63', 65', 66'; Chan Pak Chun 36'; Thiago Silva 31', 57', 82'; Mak Hou Wai 39', 48'; Choi Weng Hou 51'; Ho Chi Fong 52', 68', 69'; Felix Adzayi 54', 60'; Kong Cheng Hou 54'	Report	Lam Ka Chou 5', 50', 52', 56', 62', 64'; Ho Chi Hou 14'; Chan Seng Kin 22'; Ng Ka Ming 23'; Lam Ka Pou 33'; Ng Wa Keng 35', 47', 51', 58', 61', 65', 67'

Lin Fong Stadium, Macau
Referee: 'Grant'

Ka I	Hang Sai

== Aftermath ==
The Macau Football Association launched an investigation regarding the Taça de Macau match while both Ka I and Hang Sai conducted their own internal investigations. Players involved from both clubs clarified that the way they played was a decision they made and not reflective of their club's official stance. On 10 July, the association cancelled the result and Ka I's quarter-finals appearance, allowing their intended opponent Chao Pak Kei to advance to the semi-finals.

In the other playoff match held on the same day as the Ka I-Hang Sai tie, Monte Carlo won 2–0 against Policia, also advancing to the next round.

== See also ==
- AS Adema 149–0 SO l'Emyrne
