= 2019 Taça de Macau =

Tournament details
- Country: Macau
- Teams: 10

Final positions
- Champions: Cheng Fung
- Runners-up: Chao Pak Kei

The 2019 Taça de Macau was the 2019 iteration of the Taça de Macau, the top football knockout competition in Macau. It is organized by the Macau Football Association.

== Participating clubs ==
- Benfica de Macau
- Cheng Fung
- Chao Pak Kei
- Development
- Hang Sai
- Ka I
- Monte Carlo
- Polícia
- Sporting de Macau
- Tim Iec

== First round ==
31 May 2019

Tim Iec	2–1	Development
	Report

Lin Fong Sports Centre

16 June 2019

Ka I	21–18	Hang Sai
	Report

Lin Fong Sports Centre

== Quarter-finals ==
16 June 2019

Polícia	0–2	Monte Carlo
	Report

Lin Fong Sports Centre

Cancelled

Ka I (disqualified)	Walkover	Chao Pak Kei

Lin Fong Sports Centre

29 June 2019

Cheng Fung	6–1	Tim Iec
	Report

Lin Fong Sports Centre

29 June 2019

Benfica de Macau	6–1	Sporting de Macau
	Report

Lin Fong Sports Centre

== Semi-finals ==
17 July 2019

Benfica de Macau	1–3	Chao Pak Kei
	Report

Lin Fong Sports Centre

19 July 2019

Cheng Fung	1−1	Monte Carlo
	Report
Penalties
	7–6

Lin Fong Sports Centre

== Third place match ==
27 July 2019

Benfica de Macau	3–2	Monte Carlo
	Report

Lin Fong Sports Centre

== Final ==
28 July 2019

Chao Pak Kei	2–2	Cheng Fung
	Report
Penalties
	1–3

Lin Fong Sports Centre

== See also ==
- 2019 Liga de Elite
