= 2024 Taça de Macau =

Tournament details
- Country: Macau
- Dates: 10 July –10 August 2024
- Teams: 10

Final positions
- Champions: Gala
- Runners-up: Benfica de Macau

Tournament statistics
- Matches played: 10
- Goals scored: 45 (4.5 per match)

The 2024 Taça de Macau was the 2024 iteration of the Taça de Macau, the top football knockout competition in Macau. It was organized by the Macau Football Association.

== Schedule ==
Round	Match dates	Clubs remaining	Clubs involved	Winners from previous round	New entries this round	New Entries Notes
First round	10 July 2024	10	4	none	4	
Quarter-finals	24 July 2024; 31 July 2024	8	8	2	6	
Semi-finals	7 August 2024	4	4	4	none	
Final	10 August 2024	2	2	2	none	

== Draw ==
Round of 16
Gala	2
Monte Carlo	0
Lun Lok	4
Sporting de Macau	3

Quarterfinals
Chao Pak Kei	13
Ka I	0
Gala	3
Hang Sai	0
Benfica de Macau	3
Lun Lok	1
University of Macau	0
Cheng Fung	1

Semifinals
Chao Pak Kei	2 (4)
Gala	2 (5)
Benfica de Macau	3
Cheng Fung	1

Finals
Gala	2
Benfica de Macau	0
Third place
Chao Pak Kei	5
Cheng Fung	0

== First round ==
10 July 2024	Gala	2–0	Monte Carlo	Lin Fong Sports Centre
19:15 UTC+8		Report

10 July 2024	Lun Lok	4–3	Sporting de Macau	Lin Fong Sports Centre
21:00 UTC+8		Report

== Quarter-finals ==
24 July 2024	Chao Pak Kei	13–0	Ka I	Lin Fong Sports Centre
19:15 UTC+8		Report

24 July 2024	Gala	3–0	Hang Sai	Lin Fong Sports Centre
21:00 UTC+8		Report

31 July 2024	Benfica de Macau	3–1	Lun Lok	Lin Fong Sports Centre
19:15 UTC+8		Report

31 July 2024	University of Macau	0–1	Cheng Fung	Lin Fong Sports Centre
21:00 UTC+8		Report

== Semi-finals ==
7 August 2024	Chao Pak Kei	2–2 (4–5 p)	Gala	Lin Fong Sports Centre
19:15 UTC+8		Report

7 August 2024	Benfica de Macau	3–1	Cheng Fung	Lin Fong Sports Centre
21:00 UTC+8		Report

== Third place playoff ==
10 August 2024	Chao Pak Kei	5–0	Cheng Fung	Lin Fong Sports Centre
15:00 UTC+8		Report

== Final ==
10 August 2024	Gala	2–0	Benfica de Macau	Lin Fong Sports Centre
17:00 UTC+8		Report

== See also ==
- 2024 Liga de Elite
