= 2001 Campeonato da 1ª Divisão do Futebol =

1ª Divisão
- Season: 2001
- Champions: Lam Pak
- Top goalscorer: (Brazil) Beto (19 goals)

Statistics of Campeonato da 1ª Divisão do Futebol in the 2001 season.

== Overview ==
Lam Pak won the championship.

== League standings ==
Pos	Team	Pld	W	D	L	GF	GA	GD	Pts
1	Lam Pak	14	12	2	0	52	5	+47	38
2	Autoridade Monetária	13	8	2	3	26	17	+9	26
3	Polícia Marítima e Fiscal	14	8	2	4	29	28	+1	26
4	Polícia de Segurança Pública	14	6	5	3	24	10	+14	23
5	Monte Carlo	14	4	4	6	24	20	+4	16
6	Tim Iec	13	4	0	9	17	36	−19	12
7	Heng Tai	12	3	2	7	19	25	−6	11
8	Leng Ngan	14	0	1	13	9	59	−50	1

Source: rsssf.com
