= Canidrome, Macau =

Greyhound racing stadium in Nossa Senhora de Fátima, Macau, China

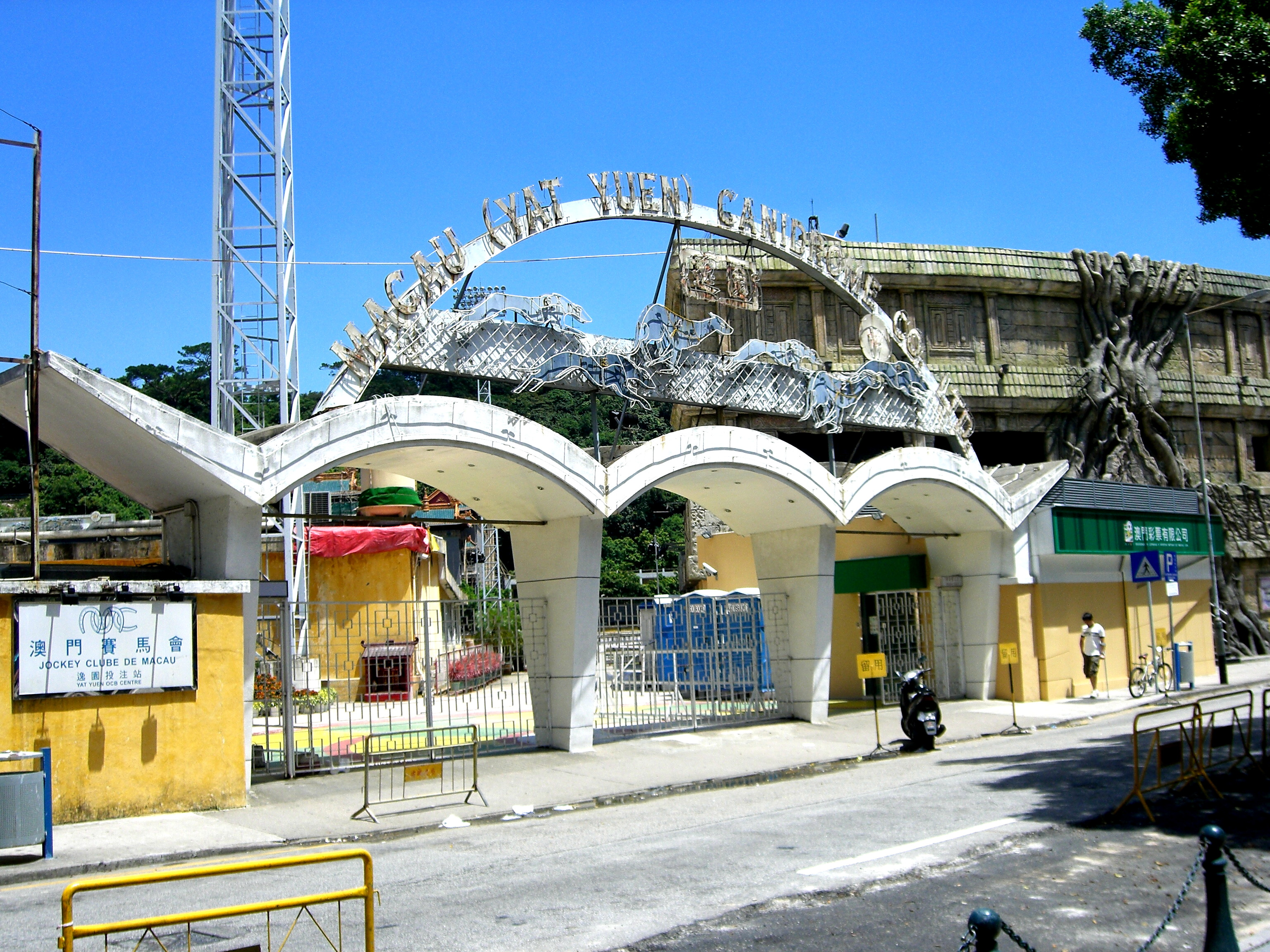
- Interactive map of Canidrome, Macau
- Location: Nossa Senhora de Fátima, Macau, China
- Coordinates: 22°12′32″N 113°32′46″E
- Date opened: 1932
- Date closed: 2018

Canidrome, Macau
- Traditional Chinese: 逸園賽狗場
- Simplified Chinese: 逸园赛狗场
Transcriptions
Standard Mandarin
- Hanyu Pinyin: Yì Yuán Sàigǒuchǎng
Yue: Cantonese
- Jyutping: jat6 jyun4 coi3 gau2 coeng4

The Macau (Yat Yuen) Canidrome Club (Chinese: 逸園賽狗場), located in Nossa Senhora de Fátima, Macau, China, was a greyhound racing stadium in Asia. Around 120 dogs took part in 16 races five days per week. It had two grandstands, several private boxes and a VIP lounge. It shared the venue with Lin Fong Sports Centre, a sport complex.

== History ==
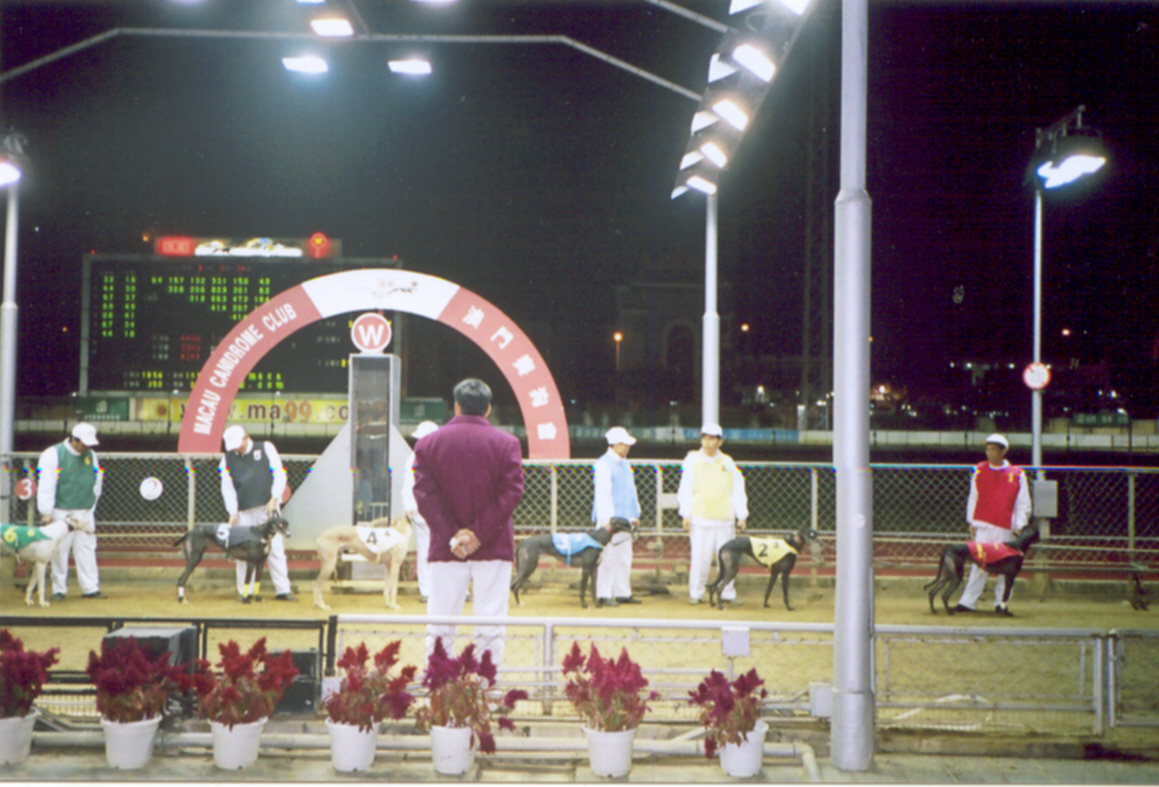
Greyhounds being paraded before the races in Macau.

The Canidrome opened in 1932 but was closed in 1938 due to the Second Sino-Japanese War. It reopened in 1963.

On 21 July 2016, the Gaming and Inspection Bureau (DICJ) of Macau, Paulo Martins Chan, met with representatives of the Canidrome. It was later announced that the government presented the greyhound racing facility with an ultimatum: close down or move to another site in two years.

The Canidrome closed on 21 July 2018. After negotiations with the track's owner and intense fundraising by an international group of volunteer-run, greyhound adoption organizations led by Anima, 517 greyhounds received veterinary medical care and were shuttled out to be adopted in Europe, North America, Australia, and, for a few, locally in Macau.

== Future use ==
In August 2018, the Land, Public Works and Transport Bureau (DSSOPT) revealed that around two-thirds of the total area would continue to be used for sports activities, including the expansion of the existing Lin Fong Sports Centre, another 20% of the space would host education facilities, it was also revealed that an underground stormwater storage tank would be built below the sports facilities. This was included in the plan so as to mitigate the risk of flooding. There will also be a parking lot with a minimum capacity of 400 parking spaces. However, in July 2019, the Macau Daily Times found the land plot in a state of neglect and decay.

== See also ==
- Lin Fong Sports Centre
