= 2018 AFC U-23 Championship qualification =

Tournament details
- Host countries: Kyrgyzstan (Group A); Saudi Arabia (Group B); Qatar (Group C); United Arab Emirates (Group D); Palestine (Group E); Myanmar (Group F); North Korea (Group G); Thailand (Group H); Vietnam (Group I); Cambodia (Group J)
- Dates: 15–23 July 2017
- Teams: 40 (from 1 confederation)
- Venue(s): 10 (in 10 host cities)

Tournament statistics
- Matches played: 57
- Goals scored: 205 (3.6 per match)
- Attendance: 277,285 (4,865 per match)
- Top scorer(s): (Iraq) Aymen Hussein (6 goals)

The 2018 AFC U-23 Championship qualification was an international men's under-23 football competition which decided the participating teams of the 2018 AFC U-23 Championship.

A total of 16 teams qualified to play in the final tournament, including China PR who qualified automatically as hosts.

== Draw ==
Of the 47 AFC member associations, a total of 40 teams entered the competition. The final tournament hosts China PR decided to participate in qualification despite having automatically qualified for the final tournament.

The draw was held on 17 March 2017, 15:00 MYT (UTC+8), at the AFC House in Kuala Lumpur, Malaysia. The 40 teams were drawn into ten groups of four teams. For the draw, teams were divided into two zones:

- West Zone: 20 teams from West Asia, Central Asia and South Asia, to be drawn into five groups of four teams (Groups A–E).
- East Zone: 20 teams from ASEAN and East Asia, to be drawn into five groups of four teams (Groups F–J).

The teams were seeded according to their performance in the 2016 AFC U-23 Championship final tournament and qualification. The following restrictions were also applied:

- The nine teams which indicated their intention to serve as qualification group hosts prior to the draw were drawn into separate groups.
- As Iran and Saudi Arabia refused to travel to each other's country, they would not be drawn into the same group.
- As Iran, Syria and Lebanon had indicated they would not travel to Palestine, they would not be drawn into the group hosted by Palestine.

	Pot 1	Pot 2	Pot 3	Pot 4
West Zone	1. **Iraq**; 2. **Qatar** **(H)**; 3. United Arab Emirates **(H)**; 4. Iran; 5. **Jordan**	6. **Uzbekistan**; 7. **Syria**; 8. **Saudi Arabia** **(H)**; 9. **Oman**; 10. Tajikistan	11. **Palestine** **(H)**; 12. Bahrain; 13. India; 14. Kyrgyzstan **(H)**; 15. Lebanon	16. Afghanistan; 17. Bangladesh; 18. Sri Lanka **(W)**; 19. Nepal; 20. Turkmenistan (unranked)
East Zone	1. **Japan**; 2. **South Korea**; 3. **North Korea** **(H)**; 4. **Australia**; 5. **Thailand** **(H)**	6. **China** **(Q)**; 7. **Vietnam** **(H)**; 8. Indonesia; 9. Myanmar **(H)**; 10. Laos	11. **Malaysia**; 12. Timor-Leste; 13. Chinese Taipei; 14. Cambodia **(H)***; 15. Singapore	16. Mongolia; 17. Hong Kong; 18. Philippines; 19. Brunei; 20. Macau

Notes

- Teams in **bold** qualified for the final tournament.
- (H): Qualification group hosts (* Cambodia chosen as qualification group hosts after the draw)
- (Q): Final tournament hosts, automatically qualified regardless of qualification results
- (W): Withdrew after draw

Did not enter
West Zone	Bhutan; Kuwait (suspended); Maldives; Pakistan; Yemen
East Zone	Guam; Northern Mariana Islands

== Player eligibility ==
Players born on or after 1 January 1995 were eligible to compete in the tournament.

== Format ==
In each group, teams played each other once at a centralised venue. The ten group winners and the five best runners-up qualified for the final tournament. If the final tournament hosts China PR won their group or were among the five best runners-up, the sixth best runner-up also qualified for the final tournament.

=== Tiebreakers ===
Teams were ranked according to points (3 points for a win, 1 point for a draw, 0 points for a loss), and if tied on points, the following tiebreaking criteria were applied, in the order given, to determine the rankings (Regulations Article 9.3):

1. Points in head-to-head matches among tied teams;
2. Goal difference in head-to-head matches among tied teams;
3. Goals scored in head-to-head matches among tied teams;
4. If more than two teams are tied, and after applying all head-to-head criteria above, a subset of teams are still tied, all head-to-head criteria above are reapplied exclusively to this subset of teams;
5. Goal difference in all group matches;
6. Goals scored in all group matches;
7. Penalty shoot-out if only two teams are tied and they met in the last round of the group;
8. Disciplinary points (yellow card = 1 point, red card as a result of two yellow cards = 3 points, direct red card = 3 points, yellow card followed by direct red card = 4 points);
9. Drawing of lots.

== Groups ==
The matches were played between 15 and 23 July 2017.

Schedule
Matchday	Dates		Matches	
Matchday	Group D	Groups A–C, E–J	Groups B–J	Group A
Matchday 1	15 July 2017	19 July 2017	1 v 4, 2 v 3	3 v 1
Matchday 2	17 July 2017	21 July 2017	4 v 2, 3 v 1	2 v 3
Matchday 3	19 July 2017	23 July 2017	1 v 2, 3 v 4	1 v 2

=== Group A ===
- All matches were held in Kyrgyzstan.
- Times listed were UTC+6.

Pos	Team	Pld	W	D	L	GF	GA	GD	Pts	Qualification
1	Oman	2	2	0	0	7	1	+6	6	Final tournament
2	Iran	2	1	0	1	2	3	−1	3	
3	Kyrgyzstan (H)	2	0	0	2	2	7	−5	0	
4	Sri Lanka	0	0	0	0	0	0	0	0	Withdrew

Source: AFC
Rules for classification: Qualification tiebreakers
(H) Hosts
19 July 2017
19:00

Kyrgyzstan	1–2	Iran
Levchenko 11'	Report	Shekari 14'; Gholizadeh 42'

Dolen Omurzakov Stadium, Bishkek
Attendance: 3,000
Referee: Ahmad Yacoub Ibrahim (Jordan)

21 July 2017
19:00

Oman	5–1	Kyrgyzstan
Al-Ghassani 61', 83', 90+1'; Al-Aghbari 81' (pen.); Al-Yahmadi 84'	Report	Abdurakhmanov 45+2'

Dolen Omurzakov Stadium, Bishkek
Attendance: 2,500
Referee: Saoud Al-Athbah (Qatar)

23 July 2017
19:00

Iran	0–2	Oman
	Report	Al-Yahmadi 48'; Al-Ghassani 71'

Dolen Omurzakov Stadium, Bishkek
Attendance: 1,000
Referee: Muhammad Nazmi Nasaruddin (Malaysia)

=== Group B ===
- All matches were held in Saudi Arabia.
- Times listed were UTC+3.

Pos	Team	Pld	W	D	L	GF	GA	GD	Pts	Qualification
1	Iraq	3	3	0	0	12	1	+11	9	Final tournament
2	Saudi Arabia (H)	3	2	0	1	11	3	+8	6	Final tournament
3	Bahrain	3	1	0	2	4	5	−1	3	
4	Afghanistan	3	0	0	3	0	18	−18	0	

Source: AFC
Rules for classification: Qualification tiebreakers
(H) Hosts
19 July 2017
17:55

Iraq	8–0	Afghanistan
Rasan 13' (pen.); Hussein 39' (pen.), 45', 65', 74', 85'; Mhawi 82'; Jaffal 86'	Report

Prince Faisal bin Fahd Stadium, Riyadh
Attendance: 500
Referee: Sultan Al-Marzooqi (United Arab Emirates)
19 July 2017
20:55

Saudi Arabia	3–1	Bahrain
Al-Aryani 7'; Al-Najei 73' (pen.); Al-Shamsan 88' (o.g.)	Report	Madan 63' (pen.)

Prince Faisal bin Fahd Stadium, Riyadh
Attendance: 500
Referee: Nagor Amir Noor Mohamed (Malaysia)

21 July 2017
17:55

Bahrain	1–2	Iraq
Madan 84'	Report	Attwan 52'; Fayyadh 70'

Prince Faisal bin Fahd Stadium, Riyadh
Attendance: 200
Referee: Yaqoob Abdul Baki (Oman)
21 July 2017
20:55

Afghanistan	0–8	Saudi Arabia
	Report	Al-Amri 12', 22'; Al-Najei 15'; Al-Aryani 18', 45+4'; Al-Tambakti 58'; Al-Rashidi 72', 81'

Prince Faisal bin Fahd Stadium, Riyadh
Attendance: 200
Referee: Dmitry Mashentsev (Kyrgyzstan)

23 July 2017
17:55

Bahrain	2–0	Afghanistan
Abdulrahman 14'; Madan 87' (pen.)	Report

Prince Faisal bin Fahd Stadium, Riyadh
Attendance: 70
Referee: Sultan Al-Marzooqi (United Arab Emirates)
23 July 2017
20:55

Iraq	2–0	Saudi Arabia
Al-Saedi 23'; Hussein 45+1'	Report

Prince Faisal bin Fahd Stadium, Riyadh
Attendance: 500
Referee: Yaqoob Abdul Baki (Oman)

=== Group C ===
- All matches were held in Qatar.
- Times listed were UTC+3.

Pos	Team	Pld	W	D	L	GF	GA	GD	Pts	Qualification
1	Qatar (H)	3	2	1	0	4	1	+3	7	Final tournament
2	Syria	3	1	2	0	3	1	+2	5	Final tournament
3	India	3	1	0	2	3	4	−1	3	
4	Turkmenistan	3	0	1	2	1	5	−4	1	

Source: AFC
Rules for classification: Qualification tiebreakers
(H) Hosts
19 July 2017
17:00

Syria	2–0	India
Srour 64'; Arnaout 88'	Report

Jassim Bin Hamad Stadium, Doha
Attendance: 853
Referee: Kim Hee-gon (South Korea)
19 July 2017
20:00

Qatar	2–0	Turkmenistan
Afif 4', 15'	Report

Jassim Bin Hamad Stadium, Doha
Attendance: 1,736
Referee: Suhaizi Shukri (Malaysia)

21 July 2017
17:00

Turkmenistan	0–0	Syria
	Report

Jassim Bin Hamad Stadium, Doha
Attendance: 780
Referee: Nivon Robesh Gamini (Sri Lanka)
21 July 2017
20:00

India	0–1	Qatar
	Report	Ali 54'

Jassim Bin Hamad Stadium, Doha
Attendance: 2,768
Referee: Chen Hsin-chuan (Chinese Taipei)

23 July 2017
17:00

India	3–1	Turkmenistan
Singh 41'; Deory 72'; Lalrinzuala 77' (pen.)	Report	Hojovov 13'

Jassim Bin Hamad Stadium, Doha
Attendance: 312
Referee: Kim Hee-gon (South Korea)
23 July 2017
20:00

Qatar	1–1	Syria
Al-Brake 38'	Report	Muhtadi 60'

Jassim Bin Hamad Stadium, Doha
Attendance: 1,760
Referee: Suhaizi Shukri (Malaysia)

=== Group D ===
- All matches were held in United Arab Emirates.
- Times listed were UTC+4.

Pos	Team	Pld	W	D	L	GF	GA	GD	Pts	Qualification
1	Uzbekistan	3	3	0	0	7	1	+6	9	Final tournament
2	United Arab Emirates (H)	3	2	0	1	6	2	+4	6	
3	Lebanon	3	1	0	2	3	4	−1	3	
4	Nepal	3	0	0	3	0	9	−9	0	

Source: AFC
Rules for classification: Qualification tiebreakers
(H) Hosts
15 July 2017
18:25

United Arab Emirates	5–0	Nepal
Al Attas 8' (pen.), 20'; Al-Akbari 22'; Ba Wazir 33' (pen.); Al-Hammadi 60'	Report

Tahnoun bin Mohammed Stadium, Al Ain
Attendance: 5,423
Referee: Jameel Abdulhusin (Bahrain)
15 July 2017
21:15

Uzbekistan	3–1	Lebanon
Khamis 20' (o.g.); Abdikholikov 30', 38'	Report	Hammoud 58'

Tahnoun bin Mohammed Stadium, Al Ain
Attendance: 50
Referee: Takuto Okabe (Japan)

17 July 2017
18:25

Nepal	0–2	Uzbekistan
	Report	Tursunov 21'; Ganiev 80'

Tahnoun bin Mohammed Stadium, Al Ain
Attendance: 1,825
Referee: Ahmed Al-Ali (Jordan)
17 July 2017
21:15

Lebanon	0–1	United Arab Emirates
	Report	Al Attas 84' (pen.)

Tahnoun bin Mohammed Stadium, Al Ain
Attendance: 570
Referee: Mohammed Al-Hoish (Saudi Arabia)

19 July 2017
18:25

United Arab Emirates	0–2	Uzbekistan
	Report	Kobilov 67'; Sidikov 90'

Tahnoun bin Mohammed Stadium, Al Ain
Attendance: 1,250
Referee: Ahmed Al-Ali (Jordan)
19 July 2017
21:15

Lebanon	2–0	Nepal
Kourani 29', 90'	Report

Tahnoun bin Mohammed Stadium, Al Ain
Attendance: 1,850
Referee: Jameel Abdulhusin (Bahrain)

=== Group E ===
- All matches were held in Palestine.
- Times listed were UTC+3.

Pos	Team	Pld	W	D	L	GF	GA	GD	Pts	Qualification
1	Palestine (H)	3	2	1	0	8	4	+4	7	Final tournament
2	Jordan	3	2	0	1	11	3	+8	6	Final tournament
3	Tajikistan	3	1	1	1	5	5	0	4	
4	Bangladesh	3	0	0	3	1	13	−12	0	

Source: AFC
Rules for classification: Qualification tiebreakers
(H) Hosts
19 July 2017
16:30

Jordan	7–0	Bangladesh
Al-Taamari 17', 50'; Al-Rawabdeh 37', 63'; Al-Reyahi 55', 78' (pen.); Faisal 58'	Report

Dora International Stadium, Hebron
Attendance: 50
Referee: Sherzod Kasimov (Uzbekistan)
19 July 2017
19:30

Tajikistan	2–2	Palestine
Chakalov 33'; Babadjanov 75' (pen.)	Report	Fannoun 18' (pen.); Juraboev 51' (o.g.)

Dora International Stadium, Hebron
Attendance: 700
Referee: Mahmood Al-Majarafi (Oman)

21 July 2017
16:30

Bangladesh	1–3	Tajikistan
Mia 33'	Report	Safarov 55'; Babadjanov 67'; Juraboev 87'

Dora International Stadium, Hebron
Attendance: 50
Referee: Çarymyrat Kurbanow (Turkmenistan)
21 July 2017
19:30

Palestine	3–2	Jordan
Abuhammad 38'; Yousef 66'; Wridat 76'	Report	Abu Arab 19'; Al-Razem 31'

Dora International Stadium, Hebron
Attendance: 700
Referee: Pranjal Banerjee (India)

23 July 2017
16:30

Jordan	2–0	Tajikistan
Al-Reyahi 55'; Faisal 68'	Report

Dora International Stadium, Hebron
Attendance: 50
Referee: Sherzod Kasimov (Uzbekistan)
23 July 2017
19:30

Palestine	3–0	Bangladesh
Abu Warda 8', 36', 90+1'	Report

Dora International Stadium, Hebron
Attendance: 500
Referee: Mahmood Al-Majarafi (Oman)

=== Group F ===
- All matches were held in Myanmar.
- Times listed were UTC+6:30.

Pos	Team	Pld	W	D	L	GF	GA	GD	Pts	Qualification
1	Australia	3	3	0	0	12	0	+12	9	Final tournament
2	Myanmar (H)	3	2	0	1	5	3	+2	6	
3	Singapore	3	1	0	2	4	10	−6	3	
4	Brunei	3	0	0	3	1	9	−8	0	

Source: AFC
Rules for classification: Qualification tiebreakers
(H) Hosts
19 July 2017
15:00

Australia	2–0	Brunei
Blackwood 53' (pen.); McGree 85'	Report

Thuwunna Stadium, Yangon
Attendance: 3,000
Referee: Yudai Yamamoto (Japan)
19 July 2017
18:00

Myanmar	2–0	Singapore
Aung Thu 60'; Hlaing Bo Bo 90+3'	Report

Thuwunna Stadium, Yangon
Attendance: 13,200
Referee: Khamis Al-Kuwari (Qatar)

21 July 2017
15:00

Singapore	0–7	Australia
	Report	Mauk 8'; Blackwood 13', 18'; Popovic 39', 60'; Clut 68' (pen.); Sotirio 73'

Thuwunna Stadium, Yangon
Attendance: 750
Referee: Ammar Mahfoodh (Bahrain)
21 July 2017
18:00

Brunei	0–3	Myanmar
	Report	Nyein Chan Aung 20', 61'; Naing Lin Tun 44'

Thuwunna Stadium, Yangon
Attendance: 10,260
Referee: Mooud Bonyadifar (Iran)

23 July 2017
15:00

Singapore	4–1	Brunei
Fandi 13', 90+1'; Akbar 39'; Suparno 86'	Report	Suhaimi 45+1'

Thuwunna Stadium, Yangon
Attendance: 9,270
Referee: Yudai Yamamoto (Japan)
23 July 2017
18:00

Australia	3–0	Myanmar
Kamau 6'; Aspropotamitis 32'; Sotirio 58'	Report

Thuwunna Stadium, Yangon
Attendance: 30,000
Referee: Ammar Mahfoodh (Bahrain)

=== Group G ===
- All matches were held in North Korea.
- Times listed were UTC+8:30.

Pos	Team	Pld	W	D	L	GF	GA	GD	Pts	Qualification
1	North Korea (H)	3	2	1	0	14	2	+12	7	Final tournament
2	Hong Kong	3	1	2	0	6	2	+4	5	
3	Laos	3	1	1	1	4	8	−4	4	
4	Chinese Taipei	3	0	0	3	2	14	−12	0	

Source: AFC
Rules for classification: Qualification tiebreakers
(H) Hosts
19 July 2017
15:00

Laos	3–1	Chinese Taipei
Sonthanalay 26', 42'; Khochalern 49'	Report	Jhou Cheng 3'

Rungrado 1st of May Stadium, Pyongyang
Attendance: 12,400
Referee: Võ Minh Trí (Vietnam)
19 July 2017
18:00

North Korea	1–1	Hong Kong
So Jong-hyok 63'	Report	Wu Chun Ming 6'

Rungrado 1st of May Stadium, Pyongyang
Attendance: 14,500
Referee: Sivakorn Pu-udom (Thailand)

21 July 2017
15:00

Hong Kong	1–1	Laos
Jordan Lam 75'	Report	Kettavong 73'

Rungrado 1st of May Stadium, Pyongyang
Attendance: 12,500
Referee: Nguyễn Hiền Triết (Vietnam)
21 July 2017
18:00

Chinese Taipei	1–7	North Korea
Lee Hsiang-wei 27'	Report	Kim Yu-song 4', 34', 90+3'; Ri Un-chol 24'; So Jong-hyok 37'; Kim Song-sun 64'; Kim Kuk-chol 72'

Rungrado 1st of May Stadium, Pyongyang
Attendance: 13,000
Referee: Võ Minh Trí (Vietnam)

23 July 2017
15:00

Chinese Taipei	0–4	Hong Kong
	Report	Tan Chun Lok 61', 70'; Lau Hok Ming 63'; Chung Wai Keung 77'

Rungrado 1st of May Stadium, Pyongyang
Attendance: 13,000
Referee: Sivakorn Pu-udom (Thailand)
23 July 2017
18:00

North Korea	6–0	Laos
Kim Kuk-bom 5'; So Jong-hyok 14', 33'; Ri Hun 21'; Kim Yu-song 56'; Jon Se-gye 87'	Report

Rungrado 1st of May Stadium, Pyongyang
Attendance: 14,000
Referee: Wang Di (China)

=== Group H ===
- All matches were held in Thailand.
- Times listed were UTC+7.

Pos	Team	Pld	W	D	L	GF	GA	GD	Pts	Qualification
1	Malaysia	3	2	0	1	5	3	+2	6	Final tournament
2	Thailand (H)	3	1	2	0	4	1	+3	5	Final tournament
3	Indonesia	3	1	1	1	7	3	+4	4	
4	Mongolia	3	0	1	2	1	10	−9	1	

Source: AFC
Rules for classification: Qualification tiebreakers
(H) Hosts
19 July 2017
16:00

Indonesia	0–3	Malaysia
	Report	Syafiq 4'; Jafri 20'; Thanabalan 30'

National Stadium, Bangkok
Attendance: 360
Referee: Jarred Gillett (Australia)
19 July 2017
20:10 (Note: The match between Thailand and Mongolia was postponed due to heavy rain from 19:00 to 20:10.)

Thailand	1–1	Mongolia
Chaiyawat 17'	Report	Munkh-Erdene 89' (pen.)

National Stadium, Bangkok
Attendance: 1,500
Referee: Rowan Arumughan (India)

21 July 2017
16:00

Mongolia	0–7	Indonesia
	Report	Saddil 17', 56'; Wanewar 31'; Gavin 34', 88'; Haay 71'; Septian 90'

National Stadium, Bangkok
Attendance: 296
Referee: Hiroyuki Kimura (Japan)
21 July 2017
19:00

Malaysia	0–3	Thailand
	Report	Chenrop 25', 45+3'; Picha 87'

National Stadium, Bangkok
Attendance: 3,019
Referee: Hasan Akrami (Iran)

23 July 2017
16:00

Malaysia	2–0	Mongolia
Thanabalan 51'; S. Andik 86'	Report

National Stadium, Bangkok
Attendance: 669
Referee: Jarred Gillett (Australia)
23 July 2017
19:00

Thailand	0–0	Indonesia
	Report

National Stadium, Bangkok
Attendance: 4,400
Referee: Rowan Arumughan (India)

=== Group I ===
- All matches were held in Vietnam.
- Times listed were UTC+7.

Pos	Team	Pld	W	D	L	GF	GA	GD	Pts	Qualification
1	South Korea	3	2	1	0	12	1	+11	7	Final tournament
2	Vietnam (H)	3	2	0	1	13	3	+10	6	Final tournament
3	Timor-Leste	3	1	1	1	7	5	+2	4	
4	Macau	3	0	0	3	2	25	−23	0	

Source: AFC
Rules for classification: Qualification tiebreakers
(H) Hosts
19 July 2017
16:00

South Korea	10–0	Macau
Cho Young-wook 10', 14', 25', 55'; Hwang In-beom 29'; Doo Hyeon-seok 48'; Park Seong-bu 53' (pen.), 78'; Jo Sung-wook 64'; Park Jae-woo 90+3'	Report

Thống Nhất Stadium, Ho Chi Minh City
Attendance: 1,000
Referee: Aziz Asimov (Uzbekistan)
19 July 2017
19:00

Vietnam	4–0	Timor-Leste
Hà Đức Chinh 17'; Nguyễn Công Phượng 67', 71' (pen.); Nguyễn Tuấn Anh 88'	Report

Thống Nhất Stadium, Ho Chi Minh City
Attendance: 6,010
Referee: Yu Ming-hsun (Chinese Taipei)

21 July 2017
16:00

Timor-Leste	0–0	South Korea
	Report

Thống Nhất Stadium, Ho Chi Minh City
Attendance: 2,500
Referee: Khurram Shahzad (Pakistan)
21 July 2017
19:00

Macau	1–8	Vietnam
Ng Wa Keng 65'	Report	Lê Thanh Bình 4', 20'; Nguyễn Văn Toàn 7', 63'; Nguyễn Công Phượng 12' (pen.); Lương Xuân Trường 24' (pen.); Hoàng Văn Khánh 26'; Nguyễn Phong Hồng Duy 49'

Thống Nhất Stadium, Ho Chi Minh City
Attendance: 7,000
Referee: Masoud Tufayelieh (Syria)

23 July 2017
16:00

Timor-Leste	7–1	Macau
Cruz 2'; Reis 24', 66' (pen.); Portela 31', 76' (pen.); Gama 52'; Sarmento 86'	Report	Lo Man Hin 64'

Thống Nhất Stadium, Ho Chi Minh City
Attendance: 5,500
Referee: Aziz Asimov (Uzbekistan)
23 July 2017
19:00

South Korea	2–1	Vietnam
Lee Sang-heon 19'; Hwang In-beom 41'	Report	Nguyễn Công Phượng 33'

Thống Nhất Stadium, Ho Chi Minh City
Attendance: 18,000
Referee: Masoud Tufayelieh (Syria)

=== Group J ===
- All matches were held in Cambodia.
- Times listed were UTC+7.

Pos	Team	Pld	W	D	L	GF	GA	GD	Pts	Qualification
1	China (Note: China PR, as final tournament hosts, are automatically qualified regardless of qualification results.)	3	2	1	0	4	1	+3	7	Final tournament
2	Japan	3	2	0	1	11	2	+9	6	Final tournament
3	Cambodia (H)	3	1	1	1	1	2	−1	4	
4	Philippines	3	0	0	3	0	11	−11	0	

Source: AFC
Rules for classification: Qualification tiebreakers
(H) Hosts
Notes:
19 July 2017
15:30

Japan	8–0	Philippines
Miyoshi 10'; Komatsu 23', 29', 42', 46'; Morishima 31'; Nakasaka 83'; Ito 89'	Report

Phnom Penh Olympic Stadium, Phnom Penh
Attendance: 321
Referee: Payam Heidari (Iran)
19 July 2017
18:30

China	0–0	Cambodia
	Report

Phnom Penh Olympic Stadium, Phnom Penh
Attendance: 7,326
Referee: Kim Dae-yong (South Korea)

21 July 2017
15:30

Philippines	0–2	China
	Report	He Chao 15'; Zhang Xiuwei 74'

Phnom Penh Olympic Stadium, Phnom Penh
Attendance: 4,328
Referee: Timur Faizullin (Kyrgyzstan)
21 July 2017
18:30

Cambodia	0–2	Japan
	Report	Endo 73'; Komatsu 84'

Phnom Penh Olympic Stadium, Phnom Penh
Attendance: 15,825
Referee: Sukhbir Singh (Singapore)

23 July 2017
15:30

Japan	1–2	China
Endo 54'	Report	Wei Shihao 40'; Deng Hanwen 45+1'

Phnom Penh Olympic Stadium, Phnom Penh
Attendance: 6,372
Referee: Payam Heidari (Iran)
23 July 2017
18:30

Cambodia	1–0	Philippines
Samnang 59'	Report

Phnom Penh Olympic Stadium, Phnom Penh
Attendance: 17,282
Referee: Kim Dae-yong (South Korea)

== Ranking of second-placed teams ==
Due to groups having different number of teams after the withdrawal of Sri Lanka from Group A, the results against the fourth-placed teams in four-team groups were not considered for this ranking.

Pos	Grp	Team	Pld	W	D	L	GF	GA	GD	Pts	Qualification
1	H	Thailand	2	1	1	0	3	0	+3	4	Final tournament
2	C	Syria	2	1	1	0	3	1	+2	4	Final tournament
3	I	Vietnam	2	1	0	1	5	2	+3	3	Final tournament
4	E	Jordan	2	1	0	1	4	3	+1	3	Final tournament
5	J	Japan	2	1	0	1	3	2	+1	3	Final tournament
6	B	Saudi Arabia	2	1	0	1	3	3	0	3	Final tournament
7	A	Iran	2	1	0	1	2	3	−1	3 (Note: Ranked by disciplinary points (Iran: 0 pts; Myanmar: 6 pts).)	
8	F	Myanmar	2	1	0	1	2	3	−1	3	
9	D	United Arab Emirates	2	1	0	1	1	2	−1	3	
10	G	Hong Kong	2	0	2	0	2	2	0	2	

Source: AFC
Rules for classification: 1) points; 2) goal difference; 3) goals scored; 4) disciplinary points; 5) drawing of lots.

== Qualified teams ==
The following 16 teams qualified for the 2018 AFC U-23 Championship.

Team	Qualified as	Qualified on	Previous appearances in AFC U-23 Championship^{1}
China	Hosts	25 November 2016	2 (2013, 2016)
Oman	Group A winners	23 July 2017	1 (2013)
Iraq	Group B winners	23 July 2017	2 (**2013**, 2016)
Qatar	Group C winners	23 July 2017	1 (2016)
Uzbekistan	Group D winners	19 July 2017	2 (2013, 2016)
Palestine	Group E winners	23 July 2017	0 (debut)
Australia	Group F winners	23 July 2017	2 (2013, 2016)
North Korea	Group G winners	23 July 2017	2 (2013, 2016)
Malaysia	Group H winners	23 July 2017	0 (debut)
South Korea	Group I winners	23 July 2017	2 (2013, 2016)
Thailand	1st best runners-up	23 July 2017	1 (2016)
Syria	2nd best runners-up	23 July 2017	2 (2013, 2016)
Vietnam	3rd best runners-up	23 July 2017	1 (2016)
Jordan	4th best runners-up	23 July 2017	2 (2013, 2016)
Japan	5th best runners-up	23 July 2017	2 (2013, **2016**)
Saudi Arabia	6th best runners-up	23 July 2017	2 (2013, 2016)

^{1} Bold indicates champions for that year. Italic indicates hosts for that year.

== Goalscorers ==
There were 205 goals scored in 57 matches, for an average of 3.6 goals per match.

6 goals

- (Iraq) Ayman Hussein

5 goals

- (Japan) Ren Komatsu

4 goals

- (North Korea) Kim Yu-song
- (North Korea) So Jong-hyok
- (Oman) Muhsen Al-Ghassani
- (South Korea) Cho Young-wook
- (Vietnam) Nguyễn Công Phượng

3 goals

- (Australia) George Blackwood
- (Bahrain) Ali Madan
- (Jordan) Ahmed Al-Reyahi
- (Palestine) Mahmoud Abu Warda
- (Saudi Arabia) Abdulaziz Al-Aryani
- (United Arab Emirates) Ahmed Al Attas

2 goals

- (Australia) Milislav Popovic
- (Australia) Jaushua Sotirio
- (Hong Kong) Tan Chun Lok
- (Indonesia) Gavin Kwan Adsit
- (Indonesia) Saddil Ramdani
- (Japan) Keita Endo
- (Jordan) Nour Al-Rawabdeh
- (Jordan) Musa Al-Taamari
- (Jordan) Baha' Faisal
- (Laos) Khamphanh Sonthanalay
- (Lebanon) Hassan Kourani
- (Malaysia) Thanabalan Nadarajah
- (Myanmar) Nyein Chan Aung
- (Oman) Jameel Al-Yahmadi
- (Qatar) Akram Afif
- (Saudi Arabia) Abdulelah Al-Amri
- (Saudi Arabia) Sami Al-Najei
- (Saudi Arabia) Fahad Al-Rashidi
- (Singapore) Ikhsan Fandi
- (South Korea) Hwang In-beom
- (South Korea) Park Seong-bu
- (Tajikistan) Nozim Babadjanov
- (Thailand) Chenrop Samphaodi
- (Timor-Leste) Kornelis Nahak Portela
- (Timor-Leste) Nataniel de Jesus Reis
- (Uzbekistan) Bobur Abdikholikov
- (Vietnam) Lê Thanh Bình
- (Vietnam) Nguyễn Văn Toàn

1 goal

- (Australia) Jonathan Aspropotamitis
- (Australia) Devante Clut
- (Australia) Bruce Kamau
- (Australia) Stefan Mauk
- (Australia) Riley McGree
- (Bahrain) Mohamed Ahmadi Abdulrahman
- (Bangladesh) Sohel Mia
- (Brunei) Azim Izamuddin Suhaimi
- (Cambodia) Sok Samnang
- (China) Deng Hanwen
- (China) He Chao
- (China) Wei Shihao
- (China) Zhang Xiuwei
- (Chinese Taipei) Jhou Cheng
- (Chinese Taipei) Lee Hsiang-wei
- (Hong Kong) Chung Wai Keung
- (Hong Kong) Jordan Lam
- (Hong Kong) Lau Hok Ming
- (Hong Kong) Wu Chun Ming
- (India) Alen Deory
- (India) Jerry Lalrinzuala
- (India) Manvir Singh
- (Indonesia) Septian David
- (Indonesia) Osvaldo Haay
- (Indonesia) Marinus Wanewar
- (Iran) Ali Gholizadeh
- (Iran) Reza Shekari
- (Iraq) Mohammed Khalid Jaffal Al-Jumaili
- (Iraq) Hussein Ali
- (Iraq) Amjad Attwan
- (Iraq) Mazin Fayyadh
- (Iraq) Alaa Ali Mhawi
- (Iraq) Bashar Rasan
- (Japan) Hiroki Ito
- (Japan) Koji Miyoshi
- (Japan) Tsukasa Morishima
- (Japan) Yuya Nakasaka
- (Jordan) Yazan Al-Arab
- (Jordan) Mohammad Al-Razem
- (Kyrgyzstan) Odiljon Abdurakhmanov
- (Kyrgyzstan) Roman Levchenko
- (Laos) Armisay Kettavong
- (Laos) Phoutthasay Khochalern
- (Lebanon) Hassan Hammoud
- (Macau) Lo Man Hin
- (Macau) Ng Wa Keng
- (Malaysia) Jafri Firdaus Chew
- (Malaysia) Muhammad Syafiq Ahmad
- (Malaysia) Syazwan Andik
- (Mongolia) Tuguldur Munkh-Erdene
- (Myanmar) Aung Thu
- (Myanmar) Hlaing Bo Bo
- (Myanmar) Naing Lin Tun
- (North Korea) Jon Se-gye
- (North Korea) Kim Kuk-bom
- (North Korea) Kim Kuk-chol
- (North Korea) Kim Song-sun
- (North Korea) Ri Hun
- (North Korea) Ri Un-chol
- (Oman) Zahir Al-Aghbari
- (Palestine) Hazem Abuhammad
- (Palestine) Mohanad Fannoun
- (Palestine) Bahaa Wridat
- (Palestine) Mahmoud Yousef
- (Qatar) Sultan Al-Brake
- (Qatar) Almoez Ali
- (Saudi Arabia) Hassan Al-Tambakti
- (Singapore) Hanafi Akbar
- (Singapore) Taufik Suparno
- (South Korea) Doo Hyeon-seok
- (South Korea) Jo Sung-wook
- (South Korea) Lee Sang-heon
- (South Korea) Park Jae-woo
- (Syria) Mohammad Fares Arnaout
- (Syria) Mohamad Rafat Muhtadi
- (Syria) Mohammad Rabie Srour
- (Tajikistan) Firdavs Chakalov
- (Tajikistan) Zoir Juraboev
- (Tajikistan) Amirdzhon Safarov
- (Thailand) Chaiyawat Buran
- (Thailand) Picha U-Tra
- (Timor-Leste) Henrique Cruz
- (Timor-Leste) Rufino Gama
- (Timor-Leste) Tomas Sarmento
- (Turkmenistan) Hoshgeldi Hojovov
- (United Arab Emirates) Mohamed Al-Akbari
- (United Arab Emirates) Mohammed Al-Hammadi
- (United Arab Emirates) Khaled Ba Wazir
- (Uzbekistan) Azizjon Ganiev
- (Uzbekistan) Islom Kobilov
- (Uzbekistan) Javokhir Sidikov
- (Uzbekistan) Dostonbek Tursunov
- (Vietnam) Hà Đức Chinh
- (Vietnam) Hoàng Văn Khánh
- (Vietnam) Lương Xuân Trường
- (Vietnam) Nguyễn Phong Hồng Duy
- (Vietnam) Nguyễn Tuấn Anh

1 own goal

- (Bahrain) Hamad Al-Shamsan (against Saudi Arabia)
- (Lebanon) Khalil Khamis (against Uzbekistan)
- (Tajikistan) Zoir Juraboev (against Palestine)
