= Carlos Javier López =

Argentine footballer

Personal information
- Date of birth: 19 March 1980 (age 46)
- Place of birth: Rosario, Argentina
- Height: 1.83 m (6 ft 0 in)
- Position: Defender

Youth career
- Newell's Old Boys

Senior career*
Years	Team	Apps	(Gls)
2000–2001	Deportes Concepción	4	(0)
2001–2002	Pachuca Juniors	30	(2)
2002–2003	Central Córdoba Rosario	26	(2)
2003–2004	Mérida	43	(4)
2004	Central Córdoba Rosario	20	(1)
2005–2006	Aldosivi	20	(2)
2006–2007	Vaduz	12	(0)
2007–2008	Paganese	31	(0)
2008	Blooming	16	(0)
2009	Estudiantes de Mérida	15	(0)
2009–2010	Deportivo Italia	30	(0)
2010–2011	Tiro Federal	30	(0)
2011–2013	Deportivo Anzoátegui	59	(4)
2013	San Martín Tucumán	9	(0)
2014	Zamora	27	(3)
2015	Deportivo Táchira	18	(0)
2015	NorthEast United	9	(0)
2016	Deportivo Anzoátegui	8	(3)
2017	Mineros de Guayana	12	(1)
Total		419	(22)
- * Club domestic league appearances and goals

Carlos Javier López (born 19 March 1980), better known as Javier López, is an Argentine former professional footballer who played as a defender.

== Career ==
López was born in Rosario, Argentina. A product of Newell's Old Boys, he started his career with Deportes Concepción in the Chilean top division.

Besides Argentina, he developed his career in Chile, Mexico, Switzerland with Liechtensteiner club FC Vaduz, Italy, Bolivia, Venezuela and India.

In October 2015, López signed for NorthEast United FC in the Indian Super League, as a replacement for the injured Kondwani Mtonga, until the end of the season.

On 1 January 2016, López returned to Deportivo Anzoátegui.

== Personal life ==
He prefers to be named by his middle name, Javier.
