= Ho Man Hou =

Macanese footballer

Personal information
- Full name: 何文浩
- Date of birth: 5 November 1988 (age 37)
- Place of birth: Macau
- Height: 1.71 m (5 ft 7 in)
- Position: Striker

Team information
- Current team: Tim Iec
- Number: 8

Senior career*
Years	Team	Apps	(Gls)
2005–2009	Macau U23		
2010–2011	Windsor Arch Ka I	7	(0)
2011–2013	G.D. Lam Pak	43	(17)
2014	Windsor Arch Ka I	14	(5)
2015–2017	Sporting de Macau	11	(2)
2017	Cheng Fung	5	(0)
2018–2019	Tim Iec		
2020–	Chao Pak Kei	17	(19)

International career^{‡}
2006–	Macau	19	(5)
- * Club domestic league appearances and goals as of 9 November 2021 ‡ National team caps and goals as of 4 June 2018

Ho Man Hou (Chinese: 何文浩) is a Macau footballer who plays as a striker for Tim Iec and the Macau national football team.

== International goals ==
No.	Date	Venue	Opponent	Score	Result	Competition
1.	11 March 2009	Leo Palace Resort, Yona, Guam	Northern Mariana Islands	3–1	6–1	2010 East Asian Football Championship
2.	11 March 2009	Leo Palace Resort, Yona, Guam	Northern Mariana Islands	6–1	6–1	2010 East Asian Football Championship
3.	13 March 2009	Leo Palace Resort, Yona, Guam	Mongolia	1–2	1–2	2010 East Asian Football Championship
4.	20 July 2012	Leo Palace Resort, Yona, Guam	Northern Mariana Islands	2–1	5–1	2013 EAFF East Asian Cup
