= Francis Dadzie =

Ghanaian professional footballer

Personal information
- Date of birth: 1994 or 1995 (age 31–32)
- Place of birth: Ghana
- Position: Forward

Team information
- Current team: Kerala United FC

Youth career
- 2012: Asante Kotoko

Senior career*
Years	Team	Apps	(Gls)
2013–2015	Bechem United		
2015	NorthEast United	11	(1)
2016	Sporting Clube de Goa	22	(9)
2018–2021	Aizawl FC	18	(7)
2021–	Kerala United FC	6	(3)
- * Club domestic league appearances and goals as of 5 February 2021

Francis Dadzie is a Ghanaian professional footballer who currently plays as a forward for Kerala United FC in the Kerala Premier League.

== Career ==
=== Early career ===
In 2012, Dadzie signed for Asante Kotoko of the Ghana Premier League. He soon went on to join fellow Premier League side Bechem United FC. In January 2014, Dadzie went on trial with the Portland Timbers of Major League Soccer but failed to make it to the team.

=== NorthEast United ===
On 6 August 2015 it was announced that Dadzie would sign for NorthEast United FC of the Indian Super League. Dadzi is the Youngest Foreign Player of NorthEast United also He is the Youngest Goalscorer in NorthEast United Jersey.

=== Sporting clube de Goa ===
On 6 October 2016 it was announced that Dadzie signed for Sporting Clube de Goa of the Goa Professional League. He has been added to the team and also made his debut in the Goa Professional League match on the same day. He had a rather memorable debut against St. Cruz Club Of Cavelossim as he scored two goals and led his team to a 2–0 victory.

== Career statistics ==
As of match played 25 November 2015

Club	Season	League			Federation Cup		Durand Cup		AFC		Total	
Club	Season	Division	Apps	Goals	Apps	Goals	Apps	Goals	Apps	Goals	Apps	Goals
NorthEast United	2015	ISL	11	1	0	0	—	—	—	—	11	1
Career total			11	1	0	0	0	0	0	0	11	1
