= Ng Wa Keng =

Macanese footballer

Ngo Wa Keng
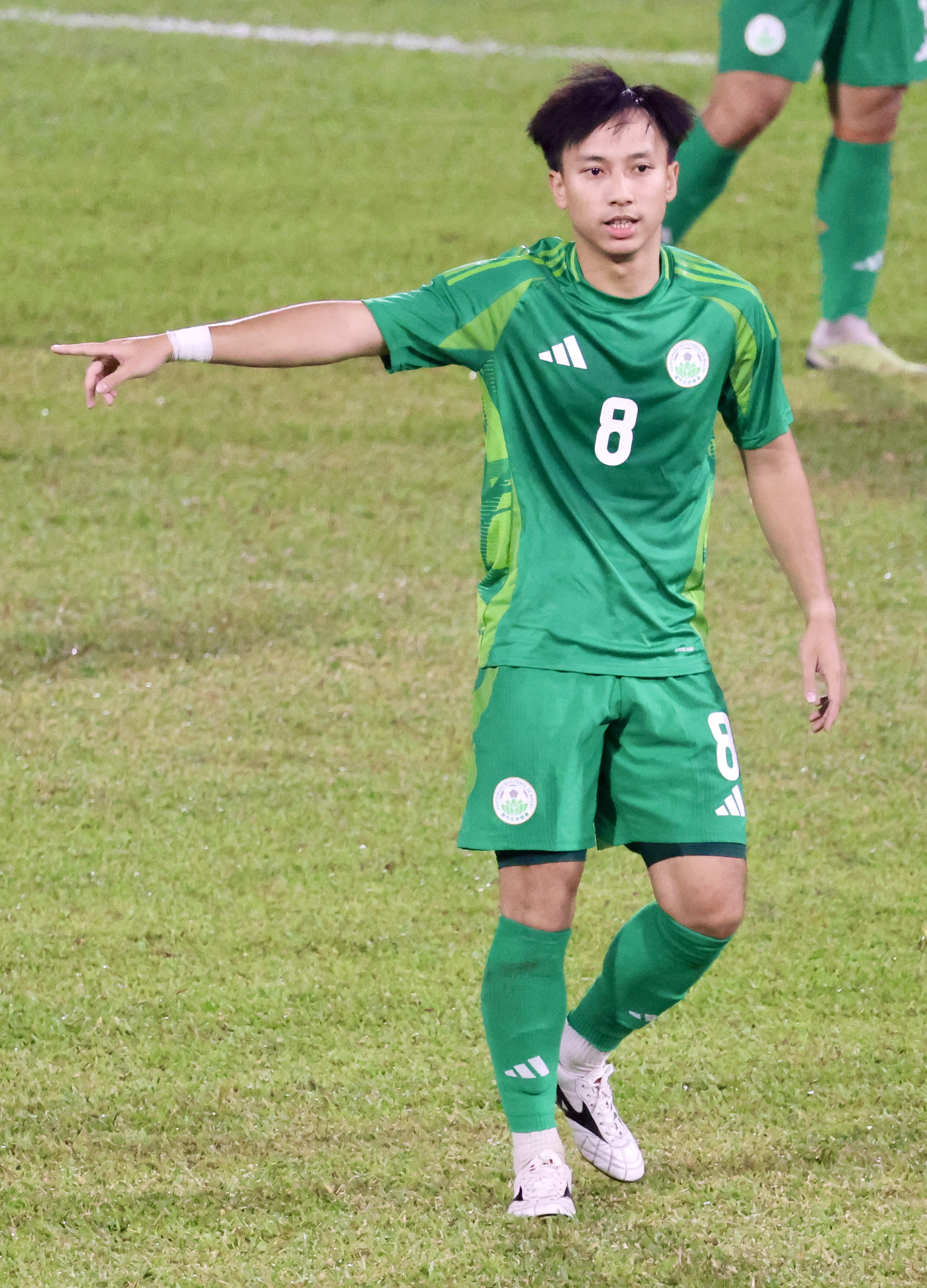
- Ngo with Macau in 2024

Personal information
- Full name: Ngo Wa Keng
- Date of birth: 2 August 1999 (age 27)
- Place of birth: Sé, Macau
- Position: Midfielder

Team information
- Current team: Chao Pak Kei
- Number: 82

Senior career*
Years	Team	Apps	(Gls)
2017	MFA Development	17	(1)
2018–2019	Hang Sai	33	(4)
2020–2023	Benfica de Macau	45	(10)
2023–	Chao Pak Kei	0	(0)

International career^{‡}
2012–2013	Macau U14	3	(0)
2014–2015	Macau U16	4	(0)
2016–2018	Macau U19	5	(0)
2017	Macau U23	11	(0)
2018–	Macau	4	(0)
- * Club domestic league appearances and goals as of 19:12, 13 March 2022 (UTC) ‡ National team caps and goals as of 19:12, 13 March 2023 (UTC)

Ngo Wa Keng (Chinese: 吳鏵景; born 2 August 1999) is a Macanese footballer who currently plays as a midfielder for Liga de Elite club Chao Pak Kei and the Macau national team.

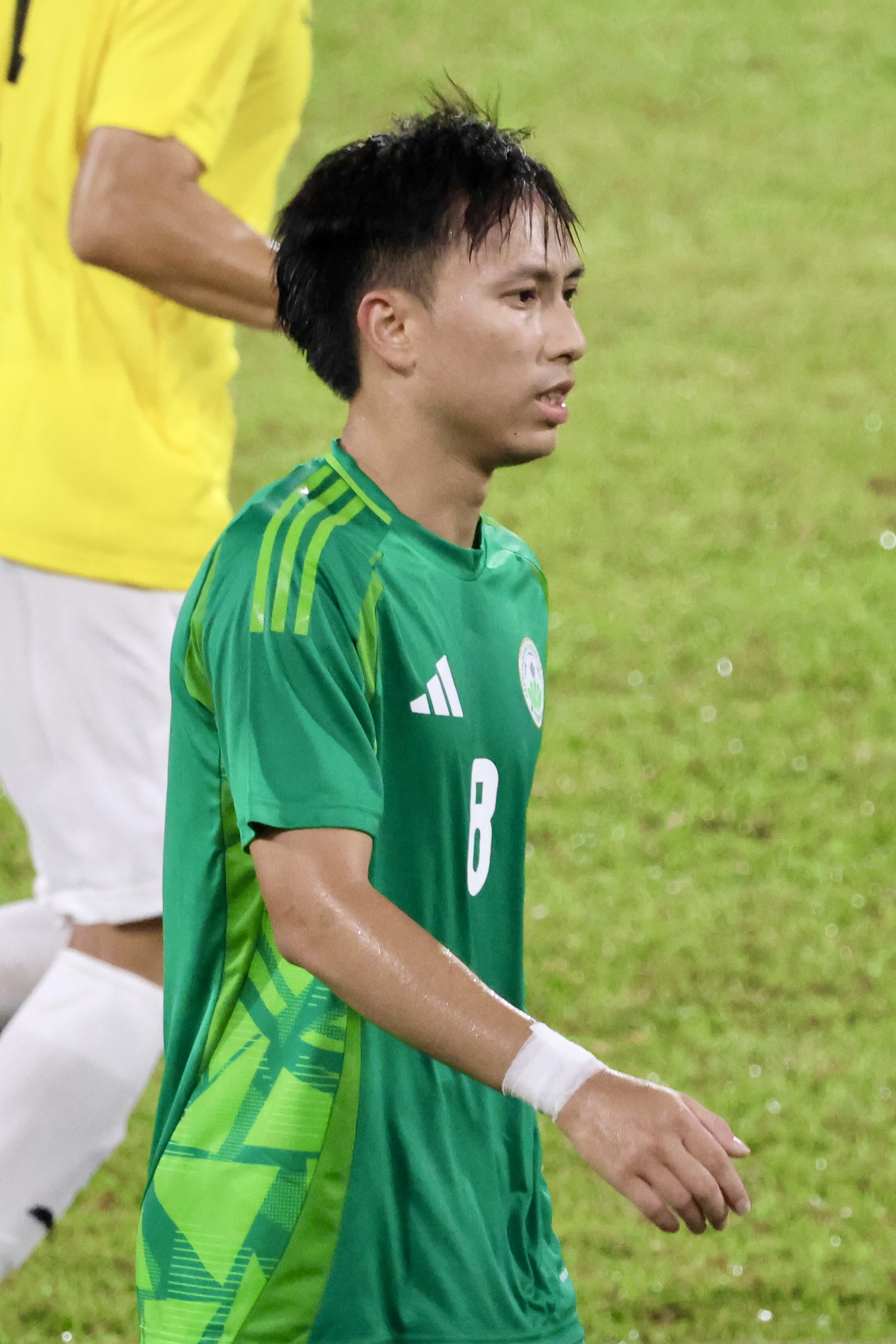
Ng playing for Macau during the 2027 AFC Asian Cup qualification against Brunei.

== Career statistics ==
=== Club ===
As of 13 March 2021.

Club	Season	League			Cup		Other		Total	
Club	Season	Division	Apps	Goals	Apps	Goals	Apps	Goals	Apps	Goals
MFA Development	2017	Liga de Elite	17	1	0	0	0	0	17	1
Hang Sai	2018	Liga de Elite	15	1	1 (Note: Appearances in the Taça de Macau)	1	0	0	15	1
Hang Sai	2019	Liga de Elite	17	3	1	7	0	0	18	10
Hang Sai	Total		29	4	2	8	0	0	31	12
Benfica (Macau)	2018	Liga de Elite	8	1	0	0	0	0	8	1
Benfica (Macau)	2019	Liga de Elite	1	0	0	0	0	0	1	0
Benfica (Macau)	Total		9	1	0	0	0	0	9	1
Career total			59	6	2	8	0	0	61	14

== International ==
As of 13 March 2021.

National team	Year	Apps	Goals
Macau	2018	4	0
Total		4	0

== International goals ==
=== Macau U23 ===
No.	Date	Venue	Opponent	Score	Result	Competition
1.	21 July 2018	Thống Nhất Stadium, Ho Chi Minh City, Vietnam	Vietnam	1–8	1–8	2018 AFC U-23 Championship qualification
