= Ng Wa Seng =

Macanese footballer

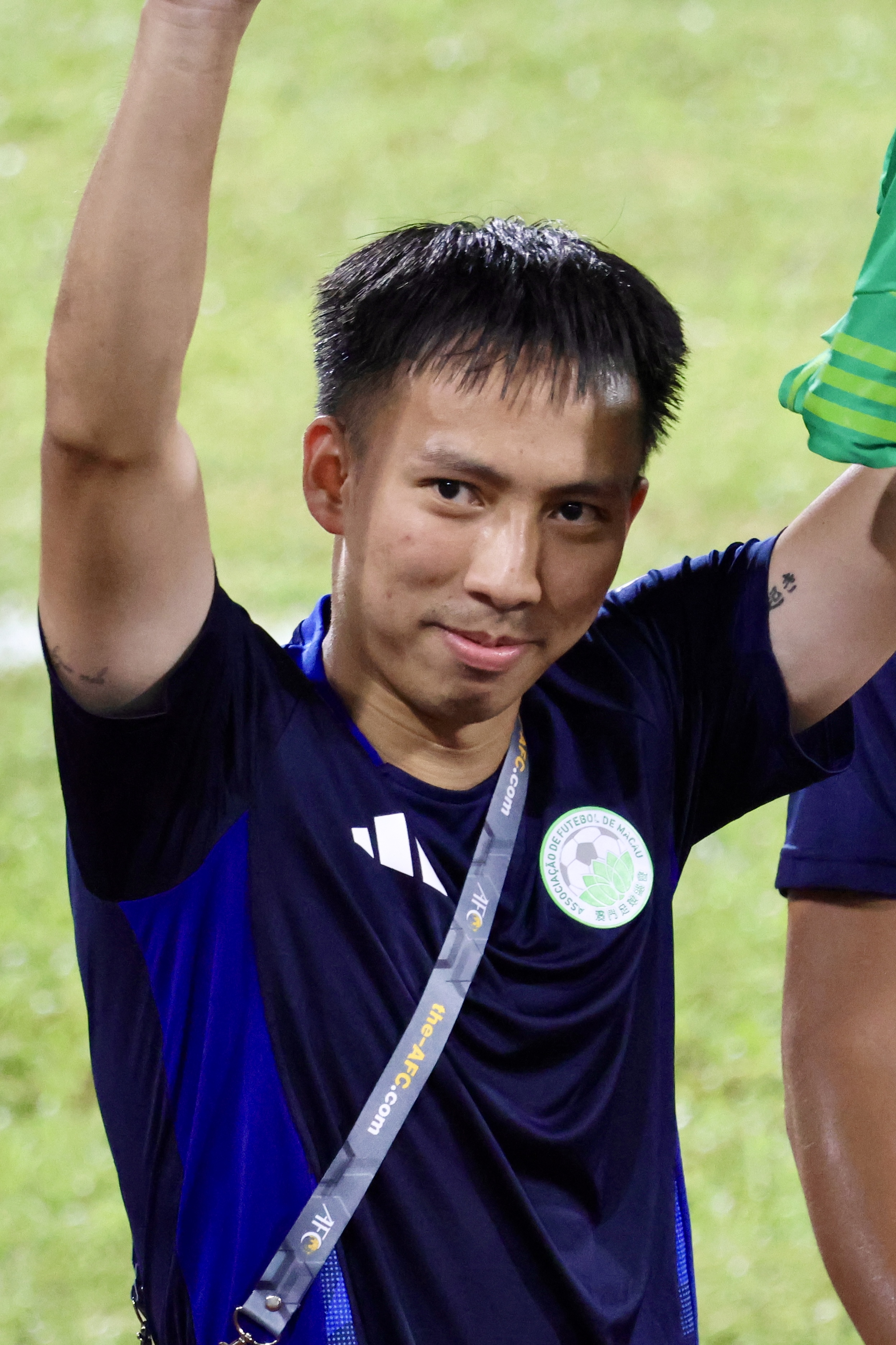
- Ng with Macau in 2024

Personal information
- Full name: Ng Wa Seng
- Date of birth: 2 August 1999 (age 27)
- Place of birth: Sé, Macau
- Height: 1.73 m (5 ft 8 in)
- Position: Defender

Senior career*
Years	Team	Apps	(Gls)
2017	Development	17	(0)
2018	Sun Hei	10	(0)
2018–2024	Central & Western	100	(4)

International career^{‡}
2018–	Macau	10	(0)
- * Club domestic league appearances and goals as of 30 June 2024 ‡ National team caps and goals as of 11:44, 7 June 2019 (UTC)

Ng Wa Seng (Chinese: 吳鏵昇; born 2 August 1999) is a Macanese footballer who plays as a defender for the Macau national football team.

== Career statistics ==
=== Club ===
As of 13 March 2021.

Club	Season	League			Cup		Continental		Other		Total	
Club	Season	Division	Apps	Goals	Apps	Goals	Apps	Goals	Apps	Goals	Apps	Goals
MFA Development	2017	Liga de Elite	17	0	0	0	–		0	0	17	0
Sun Hei	2017–18	First Division	10	0	0	0	–		0	0	10	0
Central & Western	2018–19	First Division	21	1	4 (Note: Appearances in the Hong Kong FA Cup)	0	–		0	0	25	1
Central & Western	2019–20	First Division	12	0	0	0	–		0	0	12	0
Central & Western	2020–21	First Division	2	1	0	0	–		0	0	2	1
Central & Western	Total		35	2	4	0	0	0	0	0	39	2
Career total			45	2	4	0	0	0	0	0	49	2

=== International ===
As of 13 March 2021.

National team	Year	Apps	Goals
Macau	2015	2	0
Macau	2018	2	0
Total		4	0
