= Tim Iec =

TIM IEC 添益
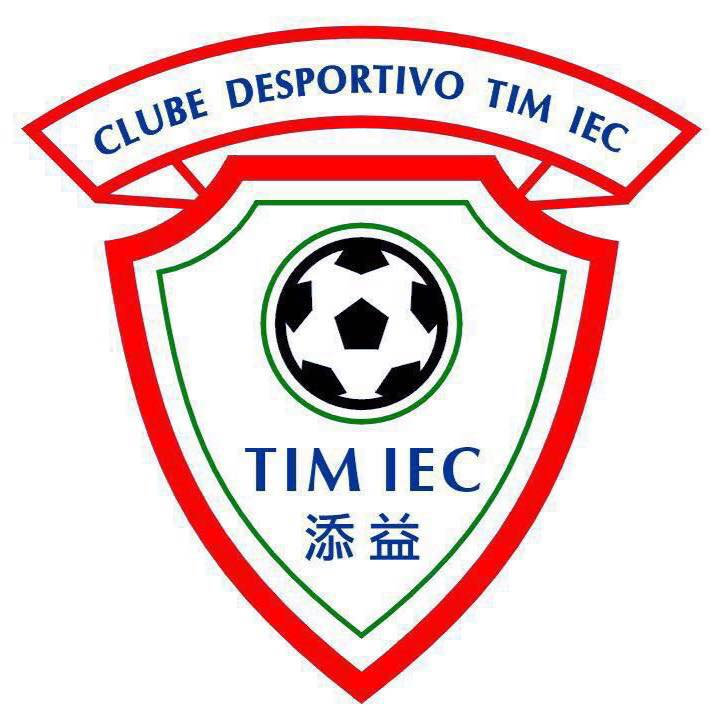
- Full name: Clube Desportivo TIM IEC 澳門添益體育會
- Founded: 1997
- Ground: Lin Fong Sports Centre; Macau
- Capacity: 2,200
- Chairman: Filipe Wong Kwan Chui
- Manager: Leonardo Ho Min Tan
- League: 2ª Divisão de Macau
- 2023: 2nd Division (Relegation Group), 1 of 5

Clube Desportivo TIM IEC (Chinese: 添益體育會) is a professional football club based in Macau. They competed in the Liga de Elite. They most recently compete in the 3ª Divisão de Macau, the third tier of Macanese football.

== Current squad ==
As of 4 September 2019

Note: Flags indicate national team as defined under FIFA eligibility rules; some limited exceptions apply. Players may hold more than one non-FIFA nationality.

No.	Pos.	Nation	Player
2	MF	MAC	Hun Seng Kuai
4	DF	MAC	Che Fu Weng
5	DF	MAC	Pang Chi Wai
7	MF	MAC	Sio Ka Un
8	FW	MAC	Ho Man Hou
9	FW	MAC	Kyle Kern
10	MF	MAC	Afonso Henrique
11	FW	MAC	Ao Ieong Kin Long
13	GK	MAC	So Ka Chon
14	MF	MAC	Tou Keng Nam
15	DF	MAC	Cheang U Hin
18	FW	MAC	Lei Chi Seng

No.	Pos.	Nation	Player
19	DF	MAC	Lei Kou Pan
20	DF	MAC	Un Tak Ian
21	DF	MAC	Lei Chi Kuan
22	MF	MAC	Leung Chon In
23	MF	MAC	Eduardo Tong
26	DF	MAC	Kuan Tin Wai
31	MF	MAC	Tang Hou Fai
32	DF	MAC	Pun Keng Lam
33	FW	MAC	Kong Wai Hou
63	DF	MAC	Un Tak Wai
67	GK	MAC	Leong Tek Kei
86	MF	MAC	Amorim Luis
91	MF	MAC	Madeira da Luz
