= Tomáš Josl =

Czech footballer (born 1984)

Personal information
- Date of birth: 12 November 1984 (age 41)
- Place of birth: Přerov, Czechoslovakia
- Height: 1.78 m (5 ft 10 in)
- Position: Left-back

Team information
- Current team: FK Chropyně
- Number: 16

Youth career
- KMK Přerov

Senior career*
Years	Team	Apps	(Gls)
- FC Tescoma Zlín
- FK Bystřice p/Hast
2004	Hranice		
2005	Olomouc	11	(0)
2005–2006	Hanácká Slávia Kroměříž	25	(5)
2006–2011	Tatran Prešov	112	(3)
2011–2012	Ruch Chorzów	0	(0)
2012–2014	Vysočina Jihlava	36	(1)
2014–2015	NorthEast United	6	(0)
2015–2016	Rapid București	21	(1)
2016–2017	Viktoria Žižkov	2	(0)
2017	Komárno	2	(0)
2017	Vyškov	4	(0)
2018–2019	Spartak Hulín	37	(5)
2019–2021	FK Chropyně	15	(8)
2024–	FK Chropyně	1	(0)
- * Club domestic league appearances and goals as of 23:35, 12 November 2024 (UTC)

Tomáš Josl (born 12 November 1984) is a Czech footballer who plays as a left-back for FK Chropyně.

== Career ==
=== 1. FC Tatran Prešov ===
In summer 2006, Josl moved to 1. FC Tatran Prešov.

=== Ruch Chorzów ===
In August 2011, he joined Polish club Ruch Chorzów on one-half year contract.

=== FK Chropyně ===
In October 2019, Josl joined FK Chropyně.
