= Alen Deory =

Indian footballer (born 1996)

Personal information
- Full name: Alen Deory Damlong
- Date of birth: 12 January 1996 (age 30)
- Place of birth: Guwahati, Assam, India
- Height: 1.77 m (5 ft 9 1/2 in)
- Position: Striker

Team information
- Current team: United

Youth career
- 2010: Sports Authority of India
- 2011: Tata FA
- 2011–2012: IMG Academy
- 2012–2014: AIFF Elite Academy
- 2014–2015: Shillong Lajong

Senior career*
Years	Team	Apps	(Gls)
2015–2018	Shillong Lajong	24	(1)
2014	→ NorthEast United (loan)	5	(0)
2015	→ NorthEast United (loan)	2	(0)
2018–2020	Mumbai City	1	(0)
2020–2021	Mohammedan	0	(0)
2021–2022	ARA	4	(0)
2022–2023	Viva Chennai		
2023–	United		

International career^{‡}
2009	India U13		
2010–2011	India U14		
2011–2012	India U16		
2013	India U19	3	(0)
2017	India U23	3	(1)
2018–	India	1	(0)
- * Club domestic league appearances and goals as of 21:10, 14 October 2021 (UTC) ‡ National team caps and goals as of 16:10, 1 June 2018 (UTC)

Alen Deory (born 12 January 1996) is an Indian professional footballer who plays as a forward for United in the I-League 2 and the India national team.

== Career ==
=== Early career ===
Born in Guwahati, Assam, Deory belongs to Tiwa community (an indigenous Assamese community). He started his career when he joined the football program of the Sports Authority of India in Assam. He then joined the Tata Football Academy in 2011 but only stayed for three-months before traveling to Florida in the United States to join the IMG Academy after receiving an IMG-Reliance Scholarship. While at the IMG Academy, Alen was a part of the India IMG Academy team that defeated the United States women's senior team in a friendly match 4–0.

After spending a couple years at the IMG Academy, Deory came back to India to join the AIFF Elite Academy Academy in Goa. While with the AIFF Academy, Deory, along with teammate Udanta Singh, took part in the Nike All Asia Camp where they were both selected to join the All-Star squad in Australia.

=== Shillong Lajong ===
On 21 July 2014, it was announced that Deory signed his first professional contract when he signed for Shillong Lajong in the I-League.

==== NorthEast United (loan) ====
After signing for Shillong Lajong, Deory sign on with their Indian Super League affiliated club, NorthEast United, on loan for the 2014 season. Deory then made his professional debut for NorthEast United on 8 November 2014 against Chennaiyin FC. He came on as a 61st-minute substitute for Seminlen Doungel as NorthEast United drew the match 2–2.

==== Mumbai City ====
After having a good season with Shillong Lajong FC, Mumbai City roped him to strengthen their attack. The 24-year-old Deory featured in only a single game for the club before leaving the side.

==== Mohammedan SC ====
Mohammedan SC signs one of India's most promising youngster Alen Deory from Indian Super League club Mumbai City FC.

==== ARA FC ====
In 2021, he signed for I-League 2nd Division side, ARA FC.

== International ==
Deory has played for India at the under-13, under-14, under-16, under-19 and India U23 levels. He made his debut for the under-13 side in 2009 before joining the under-14 side the next year. Deory was a part of the under-16 team that played in the 2012 AFC U-16 Championship and then the under-19 team for the 2014 AFC U-19 Championship qualifiers. In July 2017, he was selected in final India U23 squad which travelled to Qatar to play 2018 AFC U-23 Championship qualification and scored a goal against Turkmenistan U23.

== Career statistics ==
=== Club ===
As of 14 October 2021

Club	Season	League			Cup		AFC		Total	
Club	Season	Division	Apps	Goals	Apps	Goals	Apps	Goals	Apps	Goals
Shillong Lajong	2015–16	I-League	3	0	4	0	—		7	0
Shillong Lajong	2016–17	I-League	9	0	3 (Note: Appearance(s) in Federation Cup)	1	—		12	1
Shillong Lajong	2017–18	I-League	12	1	1 (Note: Appearance(s) in Super Cup)	0	—		13	1
Shillong Lajong	Shillong Lajong total		24	1	8	1	0	0	32	2
NorthEast United (loan)	2014	Indian Super League	5	0	0	0	—		5	0
NorthEast United (loan)	2015	Indian Super League	2	0	0	0	—		2	0
Mumbai City	2018–19	Indian Super League	1	0	1	0	—		2	0
Mumbai City	2019–20	Indian Super League	0	0	0	0	—		0	0
Mohammedan	2020–21	I-League	0	0	0	0	—		0	0
ARA	2021	I-League 2nd Division	4	0	0	0	—		4	0
Career total			36	1	9	1	0	0	45	2

=== International ===
As of matches played till 1 June 2018

National team	Year	Apps	Goals
India	2018	1	0
Total		1	0

== Honours ==
India

- Intercontinental Cup: 2018

== Personal life ==
Deory's favourite player is Cristiano Ronaldo, and he also looks up to NorthEast United teammate Koke.
