= Luis Yanes =

Colombian footballer (born 1982)

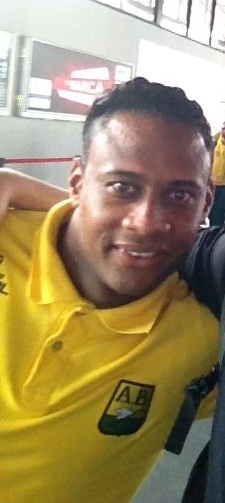

Personal information
- Full name: Luis Alfredo Yanes Padilla
- Date of birth: 29 October 1982 (age 44)
- Place of birth: Santa Marta, Colombia
- Height: 1.79 m (5 ft 10 in)
- Position: Forward

Team information
- Current team: Bucaramanga (assistant)

Senior career*
Years	Team	Apps	(Gls)
2004	Chicó	35	(12)
2005–2007	Santa Fe	88	(22)
2007–2009	Lille	2	(0)
2008–2009	→ Atlético Junior (loan)	12	(2)
2009	→ Cúcuta Deportivo (loan)	1	(0)
2010	Santa Fe	18	(5)
2010	Boyacá Chicó	12	(1)
2011	La Equidad	16	(2)
2011–2012	Zamora	33	(14)
2013–2014	Bucaramanga	9	(2)
2014	NorthEast United	6	(0)

International career
2006	Colombia	5	(0)

Managerial career
- 2019–: Bucaramanga (assistant)
- * Club domestic league appearances and goals

Luis Alfredo Yanes Padilla (born 29 October 1982) is a retired Colombian football forward.

== Career ==
Yanes was drafted by NorthEast United FC for the 2014 Indian Super League in the Inaugural International Draft.

== Coaching career ==
In September 2019, Yanes was appointed assistant manager of Sergio Novoa at Atlético Bucaramanga.

== Career statistics ==
=== International ===
Colombia
Year	Apps	Goals
2006	5	0
Total	5	0

Statistics accurate as of match played 16 August 2006
