= Kondwani Mtonga =

Zambian footballer (born 1986)

Personal information
- Date of birth: 12 February 1986 (age 40)
- Place of birth: Lusaka, Zambia
- Height: 1.88 m (6 ft 2 in)
- Position: Defensive midfielder

Team information
- Current team: ZESCO United F.C.
- Number: 18

Senior career*
Years	Team	Apps	(Gls)
2007	Zamtel Ndola		
2008–	ZESCO United F.C.		
2014	→ NorthEast United (loan)	14	(2)
2015	→ NorthEast United (loan)	0	(0)

International career^{‡}
2009–	Zambia	37	(0)
- * Club domestic league appearances and goals as of 2 August 2014 ‡ National team caps and goals as of 2 August 2014

Kondwani Mtonga (born 12 February 1986) is a Zambian professional footballer who plays for ZESCO United F.C. in the Zambian Premier League.

== Career ==
=== NorthEast United (loan) ===
In 2014 he was Loaned to NorthEast United from ZESCO United F.C. for 2014 Indian Super League. In this season scored 2 goals in 14 appearances.

He stayed another year with NorthEast United.Mtonga was ruled out for the entirety of the 2015 Indian Super League after suffering a medial meniscus injury during pre-season.

=== International ===
Mtonga started his career with Zamtel Ndola in 2007 before joining Zesco United in 2008. In 2013, Mtonga was targeted as a signing by French Ligue 1 club Sochaux. However, nothing came of the deal.

== International ==
Mtonga has played internationally for Zambia since 2009.

== Honours ==
ZESCO United

- Zambian Premier League: 2008, 2010, 2014
