= Lin Fong Sports Centre =

Sports venue in Macau

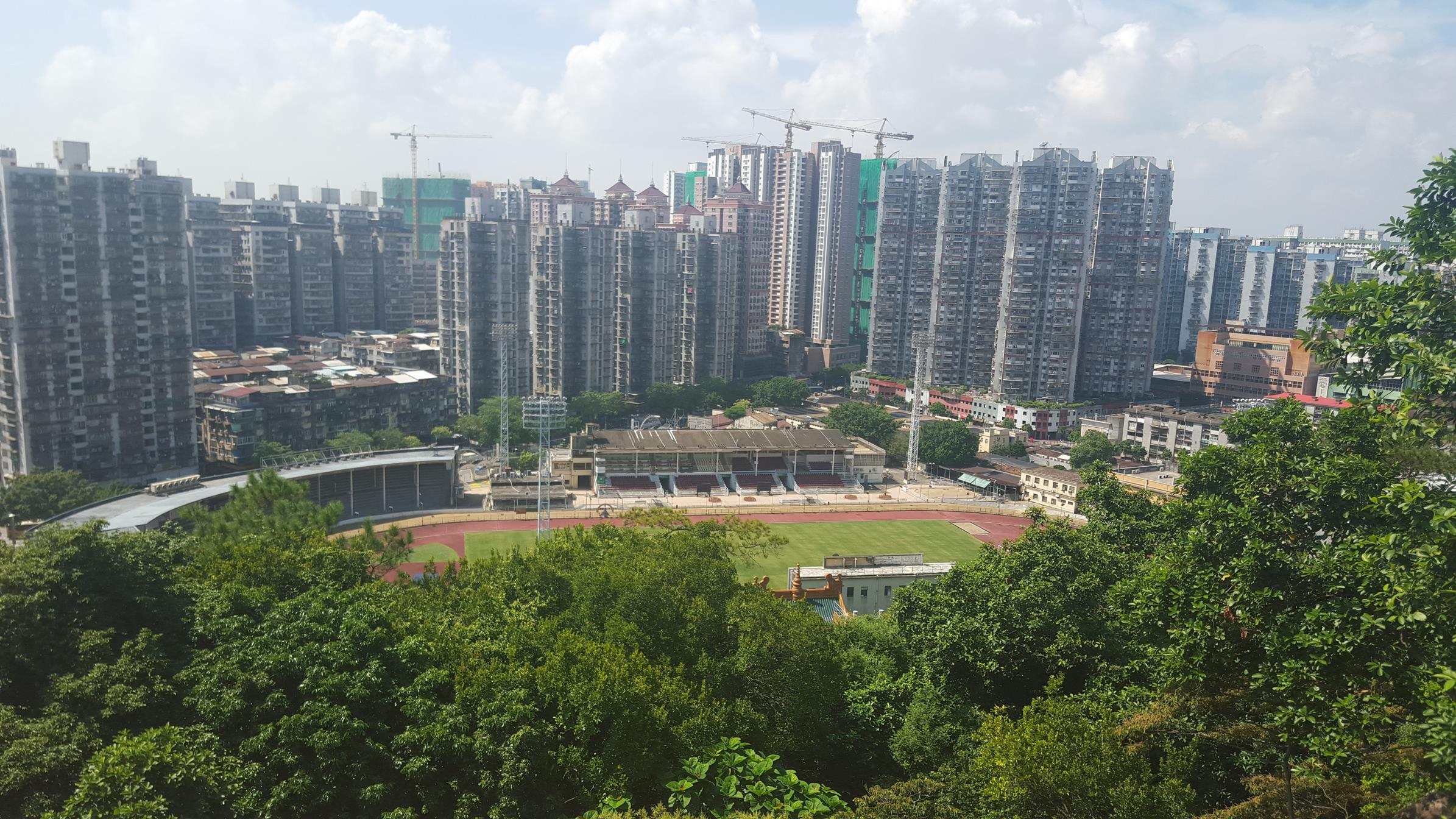
Lin Fong Sports Centre.

Lin Fong Sports Centre is a sports complex co-existing with Macau Canidrome. The sports centre incorporated a sports field, swimming pools, and a gymnasium. The natural grass turf is used mostly for football matches.

On 12 August 2017, Macau national football team played a friendly against Hong Kong Premier League club Kitchee S.C. at Lin Fong Sports Centre. Kitchee won the match 6–0.

On 17 July 2018, the Sports Bureau (ID) had announced that the Lin Fong Sports Center will extend its opening hours following the impending closure of the Macau Canidrome.

On 13 October 2018, the 74th Hong Kong Macau Interport Competition was held at Lin Fong Stadium. Hong Kong won the competition 1–6 after Macau defender Ng Wa Seng was sent off after just 7 minutes.

The majority of the matches of the 2019 Liga de Elite was played at Lin Fong Sports Centre, due to the renovation work at Macau Stadium.

On 26 July 2019, Macau national football team played a friendly with Yuen Long FC of Hong Kong at Lin Fong Stadium. The match ended 3–3.

== Facilities ==
The sports complex includes the following:

- Sports Ground which consists of a 105 m × 68 m natural grass field and athletics track. There is a grandstand with 2,200 seats.
- 5-lane running track
- Indoor Swimming Pool A
- Indoor Swimming Pool B
- Multi-function Room
- Gymnasium
- Table Tennis Zone and Room.
