= 1997 Campeonato da 1ª Divisão do Futebol =

Campeonato da 1ª Divisão do Futebol
- Season: 1997
- Champions: Lam Pak

Statistics of Campeonato da 1ª Divisão do Futebol in the 1997 season.

== Overview ==
Lam Pak won the championship.
