= 2015 Nepal National League =

Nepal National League
- Season: 2015
- Dates: 21 January - 17 October 2015
- Champions: Three Star Club; 1st National League title 4th domestic title
- AFC Cup: Three Star Club
- Matches: 72
- Goals: 211 (2.93 per match)
- Top goalscorer: 14 goals Nawayug Shrestha
- Biggest home win: 7 goals NAC 7–0 MOR (Oct 4); NAC 7–0 FWFC (Oct 9)
- Biggest away win: 6 goals FWFC 0–6 MMC (Sep 24)
- Highest scoring: 8 goals APF 3–5 FWFC (Oct 11); MMC 7–1 MOR (Oct 11)
- Longest winning run: 4 games Manang Marshyangdi; Nepal Army Club; Three Star Club
- Longest unbeaten run: 12 games Three Star Club
- Longest winless run: 16 games Morang XI
- Longest losing run: 5 games Lumbini FC (twice)

The 2015 Nepal National League, also known as the RedBull National League for sponsorship reasons, was the 2nd edition of Nepal National League. The winners Three Star Club received 1 Crore or 10 million rupees ($149,278 USD).

Red Bull energy drink was the main sponsor. San Miguel Beer was also a co-sponsor of the competition.

The league featured 9 teams from Kathmandu and the rest of Nepal.

The league was heavily affected by the April 2015 Nepal earthquake, with play being suspended from late April, resuming in September.

== Teams ==
A total of 9 teams featured in the league. The teams are Nepal Police Club, Nepal Army Club, Manang Marshyangdi Club, Nepal APF, Three Star Club, Far Western FC, Morang XI, Lumbini FC, and Jhapa XI. Machhindra Football Club, Himalayan Sherpa Club, Saraswoti Youth Club and Friends Club became unable to take part due to the ban by ANFA Makwanpur DFA were supposed to take part in the league but where disqualified for not filling out the required entries, while Sankata Boys Sports Club had earlier pulled out.

=== Stadia and locations ===
Club	Location	Stadiums
APF Club	Kathmandu	Dasarath Rangasala Stadium^{1} ANFA Complex
Far Western FC	Kailali	Dhangadhi Stadium; ANFA Complex^{2}
Jhapa XI	Jhapa	Doma Lal Rajbanshi Stadium
Lumbini FC	Rupandehi	ANFA Technical Centre; ANFA Complex^{2}
Manang Marshyangdi Club	Kathmandu	Dasarath Rangasala Stadium^{1} ANFA Complex
Morang XI	Morang	Sahid Rangsala
Nepal Army Club	Kathmandu	Dasarath Rangasala Stadium^{1} ANFA Complex
Nepal Police Club	Kathmandu	Dasarath Rangasala Stadium^{1} ANFA Complex
Three Star Club	Lalitpur	Dasarath Rangasala Stadium^{1} ANFA Complex

Remarks:
^{1} Dasarath Rangasala Stadium was heavily damaged due to the April 2015 Nepal earthquake.
^{2} Matches shifted to ANFA Complex due to violent protests in the region.

=== Personnel and sponsoring ===
Team	Coach	Captain	Shirt sponsor
Nepal Police Club	(Nepal) Birat Krishna Shrestha	(Nepal) Ju Manu Rai	Nepal Telecom
Nepal Army Club	(Nepal) Megraj KC	(Nepal) Raju Tamang	Samsung Nepal
Manang Marshyangdi Club	(Nepal) Raju Kaji Shakya	(Nepal) Anil Gurung	Laxmi Hyundai
APF Club	(Nepal) Krishna Thapa	(Nepal) Ganesh Lawati	Agni Inc. Mahindra
Three Star Club	(Nepal) Rajendra Tamang	(Nepal) Santosh Sahukhala	Ruslan Vodka
Far Western FC	(Nepal) Kiran Shrestha	(Nepal) Birendra Chand	Sudur Biscuits
Morang XI	(Nepal) Kumar Pradhan (caretaker)	(Nepal) Komal Khawas	Buddha Air
Lumbini F.C.	(Nepal) Yam Gurung	(Nepal) Dilip Chettri	Jagadamba Cement
Jhapa XI	(Nepal) Bhagirath Ale	(Nepal) Prabesh Katwal	Rum Pum

==== Managerial changes ====
Team	Outgoing manager	Manner of departure	Date of vacancy	Position in table	Incoming manager	Date of appointment
Three Star Club	(Nepal) Anjan KC	Mutual consent	13 September 2015	5th	(Nepal) Rajendra Tamang	13 September 2015
Morang XI	(Nepal) Paras Chaudhary	Banned	25 September 2015	9th	(Nepal) Kumar Pradhan (caretaker)	25 September 2015

== League table ==
Pos	Team	Pld	W	D	L	GF	GA	GD	Pts	Qualification
1	Three Star Club (C)	16	10	5	1	32	9	+23	35	2017 AFC Cup qualifying round
2	Nepal Army Club	16	9	6	1	38	6	+32	33	
3	Manang Marshyangdi Club	16	9	4	3	29	9	+20	31	
4	Jhapa XI	16	8	3	5	23	13	+10	27	
5	APF Club	16	7	2	7	29	25	+4	23	
6	Far Western FC	16	5	5	6	26	33	−7	20	
7	Nepal Police Club	16	3	4	9	14	29	−15	13	
8	Lumbini FC	16	2	2	12	10	43	−33	8	
9	Morang XI	16	0	7	9	10	44	−34	7	

Updated to match(es) played on 17 October 2015. Source: Soccerway
Rules for classification: 1) points; 2) goal difference; 3) number of goals scored.
(C) Champions

== Results ==
Home \ Away	APF	FWF	JHA	LUM	MMC	MOR	NAC	NPC	TSC
APF Club		3–5	1–2	5–1	0–1	4–1	1–1	3–0	1–3
Far Western F.C.	0–0		0–2	4–0	0–6	1–1	1–1	2–2	0–1
Jhapa XI	0–1	1–1		0–1	1–0	5–1	2–1	2–0	0–0
Lumbini F.C.	2–3	1–3	1–3		0–2	1–1	0–5	1–4	0–1
Manang Marshyangdi Club	3–0	3–0	3–2	1–0		7–1	1–1	0–0	0–2
Morang XI	1–4	1–5	0–0	1–1	0–0		0–0	0–1	1–4
Nepal Army Club	1–0	7–0	1–0	5–0	1–0	7–0		3–0	1–1
Nepal Police Club	0–2	1–4	1–3	0–1	0–1	1–1	0–3		2–2
Three Star Club	4–1	3–0	1–0	5–0	1–1	3–0	0–0	1–2	

Updated to match(es) played on 17 October 2015. Source: ANFA
Legend: Blue = home team win; Yellow = draw; Red = away team win.

== Matches ==
=== Round 1 ===
21 January 2015	Manang Marshyangdi Club	3–0	Far Western FC	Kathmandu
	Mbile 4'; Su. Shrestha (penalty missed) 34'; Sh. Shrestha 50'; Gurung 62'	Report		Stadium: Dasarath Rangasala Stadium

25 January 2015	Three Star Club	3–0	Morang XI	Kathmandu
	Sahukhala 34', 48'; Tamang 56' (o.g.)	Report		Stadium: Dasarath Rangasala Stadium

26 January 2015	Nepal Police Club	0–1	Lumbini FC	Kathmandu
		Report	Shrestha 85'	Stadium: Dasarath Rangasala Stadium

27 January 2015	Nepal Army Club	1–0	Jhapa XI	Kathmandu
	Budathoki 6'	Report		Stadium: Dasarath Rangasala Stadium

=== Round 2 ===
28 January 2015	Three Star Club	3–0	Far Western FC	Kathmandu
	Thapa (yellow card) 64'; Dongol 73', 76'; Sahukhala 90'	Report		Stadium: Dasarath Rangasala Stadium; Referee: Bikash Mahat

29 January 2015	Nepal APF	1–1	Nepal Army Club	Kathmandu
	N. Lama 72'	Report	D. Lama 36'	Stadium: Dasarath Rangasala Stadium

30 January 2015	Manang Marshyangdi Club	1–0	Lumbini FC	Kathmandu
	Su. Shrestha 56'	Report		Stadium: Dasarath Rangasala Stadium

2 February 2015	Nepal APF	4–1	Morang XI	Kathmandu
	An. Bista 41'; Rn. Bista 42', 59'; N. Lama 71'	Report	Poudel 36'	Stadium: Dasarath Rangasala Stadium; Referee: Bikash Mahat

=== Round 3 ===
3 April 2015	Nepal Police Club	1–3	Jhapa XI	Kathmandu
15:30	J. Rai 18' (pen.)	Report	K. Limbu 40'; Loktan 41'; Y. Gurung 86'	Stadium: Dasarath Rangasala Stadium; Referee: Laba Khatri; Man of the Match: Dilen Loktan (Jhapa XI)

5 April 2015	Three Star Club	0–0	Nepal Army Club	Kathmandu
15:30	Sahukhala (red card) 51'	Report		Stadium: Dasarath Rangasala Stadium; Referee: Sudis Pandey; Man of the Match: Jitendra Karki (Nepal Army Club)

6 April 2015	Far Western FC	1–1	Morang XI	Kailali District
15:30	Aba 78'	Report	Poudel 55'	Stadium: Dhangadi stadium Referee: Nabindra Maharaj; Man of the Match: Cedric Aba

6 April 2015	Lumbini FC	1–3	Jhapa XI	Butwal
15:30	Gahatraj 38' (pen.)	Report	K. Limbu 45+1', 72', 80'	Stadium: ANFA Technical Center; Referee: Shrawan Lama; Man of the Match: Karna Limbu

=== Round 4 ===
8 April 2015	Nepal Police Club	0–2	Nepal APF	Kathmandu
15:30		Report	Rn. Bista 10', 59'	Stadium: Dasarath Rangasala Stadium; Referee: Sudis Pandey; Man of the Match: Ranjan Bista

8 April 2015	Manang Marshyangdi Club	1–1	Nepal Army Club	Kathmandu
15:30	Gurung 13'	Report	Khawas 4'	Stadium: Dasarath Rangasala Stadium; Referee: Laba Khatri

9 April 2015	Far Western FC	0–2	Jhapa XI	Kailali District
15:30		Report	K. Limbu 40', 80'	Stadium: Dhangadi stadium Referee: Nabindra Maharjan

9 April 2015	Lumbini FC	1–1	Morang XI	Butwal
15:30	A. Gurung 83'	Report	Jas Rai 23'	Stadium: ANFA Technical Center; Referee: Sharwan Lama

=== Round 5 ===
10 April 2015	Three Star Club	1–2	Nepal Police Club	Kathmandu
15:30	Khadka 81'	Report	Shah 1'; Karki 24'	Stadium: Dasarath Rangasala Stadium; Referee: Sudis Pandey; Man of the Match: Bharat Shah

11 April 2015	Manang Marshyangdi Club	3–0	Nepal APF	Kathmandu
15:30	B. Rai 10'; Dodoz 40'; Sh. Shrestha 56'	Report		Stadium: Dasarath Rangasala Stadium; Referee: Bikash Mahat

12 April 2015	Far Western FC	4–0	Lumbini FC	Kailali District
15:30	A. Tamang 40'; Aba 49', 69', 90'	Report		Stadium: Dhangadi stadium Referee: Nabindra Maharjan

13 April 2015	Morang XI	0–1	Nepal Police Club	Biratnagar
15:30		Report	J. Rai 90+1'	Stadium: Sahid Rangashala

13 April 2015	Jhapa XI	0–0	Three Star Club	Birtamod
15:30		Report		Stadium: Domalal Stadium; Attendance: 7,000

=== Round 6 ===
16 April 2015	Morang XI	0–0	Manang Marshyangdi Club	Biratnagar
15:30		Report		Stadium: Sahid Rangashala; Referee: Bikash Mahat

16 April 2015	Far Western FC	0–0	Nepal APF	Kailali District
16:00		Report		Stadium: Dhangadi stadium

16 April 2015	Lumbini FC	0–5	Nepal Army Club	Butwal
15:30		Report	N. Shrestha 40', 70'; Budathoki 65'; Basnet 85', 90+2'	Stadium: ANFA Technical Center

18 April 2015	Jhapa XI	1–0	Manang Marshyangdi Club	Birtamod
15:30	Khadka 81'	Report		Stadium: Domalal Stadium

18 April 2015	Far Western FC	1–1	Nepal Army Club	Kailali District
16:00	Lawol 42'	Report	Budathoki 4'	Stadium: Dhangadi stadium Referee: Bikash Mahat

18 April 2015	Lumbini FC	2–3	Nepal APF	Butwal
15:30	Gahatraj 53' (pen.); M. Gurung 66'	Report	H. Gurung 1'; N. Lama 9'; Lawati 19'	Stadium: ANFA Technical Center; Referee: Sudis Pandey

=== Round 7 ===
22 April 2015	Lumbini FC	0–1	Three Star Club	Butwal
16:00		Report	Sahukhala 80'	Stadium: ANFA Technical Center

22 April 2015	Far Western FC	2–2	Nepal Police Club	Kailali District
16:00	Aba 30'; Lawol 75'	Report	Karki 35'; R. Shrestha 80'	Stadium: Dhangadi stadium

22 April 2015	Morang XI	0–0	Nepal Army Club	Biratnagar
16:000		Report		Stadium: Sahid Rangashala

22 April 2015	Jhapa XI	0–1	Nepal APF	Birtamod
16:00		Report	Syangtan 90+1'	Stadium: Domalal Stadium; Referee: Iaba Khatri

=== Round 8 ===
25 April 2015	Jhapa XI	5–1	Morang XI	Birtamod
16:00	K. Limbu 30'; Abbas (yellow card) 31' (yellow-red card) 44'; D. Karki 60', 74'; Y. Gurung 70', 87'	Report	T. Limbu 23'; Ghale (red card) 64'	Stadium: Domalal Stadium

==== League resumption ====
14 September 2015	Manang Marshyangdi Club	0–0	Nepal Police Club	Lalitpur
15:30		Report		Stadium: ANFA Complex; Referee: Sudis Pandey

15 September 2015	Three Star Club	4–1	Nepal APF	Lalitpur
15:30	Segun-Akinade 10'; Shrestha 37', 90+4'; B. Gurung 58'	Report	H. Gurung 58'	Stadium: ANFA Complex; Referee: Bikash Mahat

16 September 2015	Lumbini FC	1–3	Far Western FC	Lalitpur
15:00	K. Shrestha 24'; B. Shrestha (yellow card) 51' (yellow-red card) 54'	Report	H. Magar (penalty missed) 11'; B. Magar 52' (pen.); S. Thapa 84'; Rajbanshi 90'	Stadium: ANFA Complex; Referee: Kabin Byanjankar

16 September 2015	Morang XI	0–0	Jhapa XI	Morang
15:30		Report		Stadium: Laxmi Marga Stadium; Referee: Shrawan Lama

=== Round 9 ===
17 September 2015	Nepal Police Club	0–3	Nepal Army Club	Lalitpur
12:00		Report	Shrestha 15', 65', 90+4'	Stadium: ANFA Complex; Referee: Bikash Mahat

18 September 2015	Three Star Club	1–1	Manang Marshyangdi Club	Lalitpur
15:30	J. Shrestha 9'	Report	S. Shrestha 35' (pen.)	Stadium: ANFA Complex; Referee: Sudis Pandey

19 September 2015	Jhapa XI	0–1	Lumbini F.C.	Birtamod, Jhapa
16:00		Report	PB. Gurung 18'; K. Shrestha (yellow card) 57'; Dhungana (yellow card) 24'	Stadium: Domalal Stadium; Attendance: 4,000; Referee: Nabindra Maharjan

19 September 2015	Morang XI	1–5	Far Western F.C.	Morang
16:00	Khadka 45+3'	Report	Lawal 43'; Tamang 60'; Aba 85'; Ligal 90'; Magar 90+3'	Stadium: Laxmi Marga Stadium; Attendance: 3,000; Referee: Shrawan Lama

20 September 2015	Nepal Army Club	1–0	Nepal APF	Lalitpur
12:00	Budathoki 71'; Khawas (yellow card) (yellow-red card) 90+2'	Report		Stadium: ANFA Complex

=== Round 10 ===
21 September 2015	Nepal Police Club	2–2	Three Star Club	Lalitpur
15:30	Rai 40' (yellow card) 70'; Shrestha 83'	Report	Thapa 37'; Sahukhala 69' (pen.) (yellow card) 75'; Sunar (yellow card) (yellow-red card) 70'	Stadium: ANFA Complex; Referee: Bikash Mahat

21 September 2015	Jhapa XI	1–1	Far Western F.C.	Birtamod, Jhapa
16:00	Rai 80'	Report	Subedi 65'

21 September 2015	Morang XI	1–1	Lumbini F.C.	Morang
16:00	Khadka 61'	Report	Ruchal 83'	Stadium: Laxmi Marga Stadium

24 September 2015	Far Western F.C.	0–6	Manang Marshyangdi Club	Lalitpur
12:30		Report	R. KC 27'; B. Rai 37'; Dodoz 45+3'; S. KC (yellow card) 46'; Gurung 56'; D. Rai 64', 90+1'; Sh. Shrestha (yellow card) 68'	Stadium: ANFA Complex; Referee: Sharwan Lama

24 September 2015	Morang XI	1–4	Three Star Club	Morang
15:00	Limbu 34'	Report	Olawale 45+2'; Sahukhala 77', 90', 90+3'	Stadium: Laxmi Marga Stadium

24 September 2015	Lumbini F.C.	1–4	Nepal Police Club	Lalitpur
15:30	Thapa 50' (o.g.)	Report	Karki 30', 43', 54'; Shah 45'	Stadium: ANFA Complex

25 September 2015	Jhapa XI	2–1	Nepal Army Club	Birtamod, Jhapa
15:00	Limbu 1' (pen.), 14'	Report	Karki 90'	Referee: Laba Khatri

=== Round 11 ===
26 September 2015	Lumbini F.C.	0–2	Manang Marshyangdi Club	Lalitpur
15:00		Report 1 Report 2	R. KC 55'; Gurung 90+5'	Stadium: ANFA Complex; Referee: Bikash Mahat

26 September 2015	Morang XI	1–4	Nepal APF	Morang
15:00	Limbu 83'	Report	Lawati 21', 43', 47'; Bista 66'	Stadium: Laxmi Marga Stadium

27 September 2015	Far Western F.C.	0–1	Three Star Club	Lalitpur
15:00		Report	Olawale 13'	Stadium: ANFA Complex; Referee: Bikash Mahat

27 September 2015	Jhapa XI	2–0	Nepal Police Club	Birtamod
15:00	K. Limbu 41', 82'	Report		Stadium: Domalal Stadium

29 September 2015	Nepal Police Club	1–4	Far Western F.C.	Lalitpur
12:30	Rai 19'	Report	Tamang 2'; Subedi 41'; Magar 48'; Tamang 90'	Stadium: ANFA Complex; Referee: Nabindra Maharjan

29 September 2015	Nepal Army Club	1–0	Manang Marshyangdi Club	Lalitpur
15:30	Shrestha 18'	Report		Stadium: ANFA Complex; Referee: Laba Khatri

=== Round 12 ===
1 October 2015	Three Star Club	1–1	Nepal Army Club	Lalitpur
15:00	Thapa 38'	Report 1 Report 2	Budathoki 25'	Stadium: ANFA Complex; Referee: Sharwan Lama

2 October 2015	Nepal APF	3–0	Nepal Police Club	Lalitpur
15:00	Bista 10', 47'; Lawati 77'	Report 1 Report 2		Stadium: ANFA Complex

4 October 2015	Nepal Army Club	7–0	Morang XI	Lalitpur
12:30	Khawas 4', 19'; Basnet 40'; N. Shrestha 49', 54', 87'; Budathoki 56'	Report 1 Report 2		Stadium: ANFA Complex; Referee: Kabin Byanjankar

4 October 2015	Three Star Club	5–0	Lumbini F.C.	Lalitpur
15:30	Olawale 29', 62'; Dongol 37'; J. Shrestha 58', 78'	Report 1 Report 2		Stadium: ANFA Complex; Referee: Nabindra Maharjan

5 October 2015	Nepal APF	0–1	Manang Marshyangdi Club	Lalitpur
14:40		Report 1 Report 2	R. KC 90+2'	Stadium: ANFA Complex; Referee: Sudish Pandey

6 October 2015	Nepal Police Club	1–1	Morang XI	Lalitpur
14:30	Shrestha 76'	Report 1 Report 2	Basnet 90+1'	Stadium: ANFA Complex

=== Round 13 ===
7 October 2015	Manang Marshyangdi Club	3–2	Jhapa XI	Lalitpur
15:00	Rai 58', 70'; A. Gurung 90+5'	Report 1 Report 2	Limbu 19'; Y. Gurung 84'	Stadium: ANFA Complex; Referee: Sudish Pandey

8 October 2015	Nepal APF	5–1	Lumbini F.C.	Lalitpur
15:30	Lawati 3', 45+1', 55'; Nepali 8'; Shrestha 79'	Report 1 Report 2	Hamal 35'	Stadium: ANFA Complex; Referee: Nabindra Maharjan; Man of the Match: Ganesh Lawati (Nepal APF)

9 October 2015	Nepal Army Club	7–0	Morang XI	Lalitpur
15:30	Khawas 34'; Basnet 38'; Lama 49'; Budathoki 79'; Tamang 81'; Shrestha 84', 87' (pen.)	Report 1 Report 2		Stadium: ANFA Complex; Referee: Laba Khatri

10 October 2015	Three Star Club	1–0	Jhapa XI	Lalitpur
15:30	Shrestha 69'	Report 1 Report 2		Stadium: ANFA Complex; Referee: Sudish Pandey

11 October 2015	Nepal APF	3–5	Far Western F.C.	Lalitpur
12:30	Bista 55', 90+2'; Sikhrakar 72'	Report 1 Report 2	Thapa 15'; H. Magar 28'; B. Magar 37'; Ligal 83'; Bal 90'	Stadium: ANFA Complex; Referee: Shrawan Lama; Man of the Match: Janom Lal Ligal (Far Western F.C.)

11 October 2015	Manang Marshyangdi Club	7–1	Morang XI	Lalitpur
16:30	Paswan 39', 69', 82'; Gurung 44'; Lama 60', 90'; KC 62'	Report	Rai 51'	Stadium: ANFA Complex; Referee: Kabin Byanjankar

=== Round 14 ===
12 October 2015	Nepal Army Club	5–0	Lumbini F.C.	Lalitpur
14:30	Khawas 4'; Basnet 63', 83'; Shrestha 75', 78'	Report 1 Report 2		Stadium: ANFA Complex; Referee: Prajwol Chhetri

13 October 2015	Three Star Club	3–1	Nepal APF	Lalitpur
14:30	Afeez 5', 24'; Gurung 67'	Report 1 Report 2	Lawati 50'	Stadium: ANFA Complex; Referee: Sudis Pandey; Man of the Match: Olawale Afeez (Three Star Club)

14 October 2015	Nepal Police Club	0–1	Manang Marshyangdi Club	Lalitpur
14:30		Report 1 Report 2	Gurung 50'	Stadium: ANFA Complex; Referee: Laba Khatri; Man of the Match: Anil Gurung (Manang Marshyangdi)

15 October 2015	Nepal APF	1–2	Jhapa XI	Lalitpur
14:30	Gurung 13'	Report	Limbu 15'; Karki 38'	Stadium: ANFA Complex; Referee: Bikash Mahat

16 October 2015	Nepal Police Club	0–3	Nepal Army Club	Lalitpur
14:30		Report	Budathoki 29'; Shrestha 51'; Basnet 82'	Stadium: ANFA Complex; Man of the Match: Santosh Tamang (Nepal Army Club)

17 October 2015	Manang Marshyangdi Club	0–2	Three Star Club	Lalitpur
14:00	Sissoko (yellow card) 66'; A. Lama (yellow card) 89'; Moussa (yellow card) (yellow-red card) 90+4'; Sushil KC (red card) 90+5'	Report	B. Gurung (yellow card) 45'; Afeez 48', (yellow card) 16'; Victor (yellow card) 90+1'; B. Dhimal 90+1', (red card) 90+5'	Stadium: ANFA Complex

== Season statistics ==
=== Top goalscorers ===
As of matches played on 17 October 2015.

Rank	Player	Club	Goals
1	(Nepal) Nawayug Shrestha	Nepal Army Club	14
2	(Nepal) Karna Limbu	Jhapa XI	13
3	(Nepal) Ganesh Lawati	APF Club	10
4	(Nepal) Santosh Sahukhala	Three Star Club	8
4	(Nepal) Tek Bahadur Budathoki	Nepal Army Club	8
5	(Nigeria) Olawale Afeez	Three Star Club	7
6	(Nepal) Anil Gurung	Manang Marshyangdi Club	6
6	(Cameroon) Cedric Aba	Far Western FC	6
6	(Nepal) Jagjit Shrestha	Three Star Club	6
6	(Nepal) Ranjan Bista	APF Club	6
7	(Nepal) Bharat Khawas	Nepal Army Club	5
7	(Nepal) Binod Karki	Nepal Police Club	5
7	(Nepal) Tanka Basnet	Nepal Army Club	5
8	(Nepal) Bimal Gharti Magar	Far Western FC	4
8	(Nepal) Ju Manu Rai	Nepal Police Club	4
9	10 players		3
10	19 players		2
11	34 players		1

=== Hat-tricks ===
Player	Club	Against	Result	Date
(Nepal) Karna Limbu	Jhapa XI	Lumbini FC	1–3	6 April 2015
(Cameroon) Cedric Aba	Far Western FC	Lumbini FC	4–0	12 April 2015
(Nepal) Nawayug Shrestha	Nepal Army Club	Nepal Police Club	3–0	17 September 2015
(Nepal) Binod Karki	Nepal Police Club	Lumbini FC	1–4	24 September 2015
(Nepal) Santosh Sahukhala	Three Star Club	Morang XI	1–4	24 September 2015
(Nepal) Ganesh Lawati	APF Club	Morang XI	1–4	26 September 2015
(Nepal) Nawayug Shrestha	Nepal Army Club	Morang XI	7–0	4 October 2015
(Nepal) Ganesh Lawati	APF Club	Lumbini FC	5–1	8 October 2015
(Nepal) Rawi Paswan	Manang Marshyangdi Club	Morang XI	7–1	11 October 2015

=== Own Goals ===
Player	Club	Against	Date
(Nepal) Rupesh Tamang	Morang XI	Three Star Club	25 January 2015
(Nepal) Ritesh Thapa	Nepal Police Club	Lumbini FC	24 September 2015

== Awards ==
All Nepal Football Association awarded the following awards for the National League season.

- Best goalkeeper : Kiran Chemjong (Three Star Club)
- Best defender : Devendra Tamang (Jhapa XI)
- Best midfielder : Bishal Rai (Manang Marshyangdi Club)
- Best forward : Nawayug Shrestha (Nepal Army Club)
- Best coach : Rajendra Tamang (Three Star Club)

== Controversy ==
The conditions of many stadiums has been heavily criticized as many; including the national stadium, are in poor condition.

Some Jhapa XI fans were left feeling aggrieved after the venue was moved from Chandragadhi, where there was a well maintained stadium to the Domalal Stadium in Birtamod, which is smaller but in a more central location.

It was initially decided that matches would only be played on weekends so teams had adequate rest time and venues wouldn't be overused, but the ANFA decided to revert this decision and schedule matches one after the other, which vexed many team officials and supporters. Nepal Army Club coach Megraj KC publicly criticized the cramped schedules saying that they would hurt team performances.

Jhapa XI were unable to train on a proper pitch before an away match against Nepal Police Club on 3 April. Instead of being allowed to train in the Police Club's Dasarath Stadium they were instead made to train on the Tudhikhel grounds, whose surface is composed of sand and rocks not grass and is not a proper football pitch. Jhapa coach Bhagirath Ale publicly criticized the ANFA for refusing to grant them permission to train at the national stadium, although he stated that the improper practice session would not have an effect on Jhapa's performance against the police club.

== Effects of the April earthquake and subsequent May aftershock on league play ==
Following the 25 April the National League was immediately suspended by the ANFA as the Country was in a State of emergency. Many of the venues were damaged. The Dasarath Rangasala Stadium, which was already in poor shape and in need of repair before the earthquake was rendered completely unplayable as it sustained severe damaged to the stands, grounds, and many of the walls surrounding the stadium collapsed. Following the quake and subsequent aftershock the vast majority of players and staff of the respective teams took time off to help, Bikram Lama spent time delivery relief supplies in Sindhupalchowk for example, and many charitable matches and tournaments were also held to raise awareness and money.

On 8 July the ANFA announced that the National League would resume in mid September.

== Prizes ==
The winning club will receive 1 Crore while the runners up 50 Lakhs and the third place team is set to receive 25 Lakhs. The fourth placed will get 15Lakhs and 5th place will get 7 Lakhs Coaches and players who are the recipients of individual awards will each be gifted a motorbike.
