= 2024 KP Oli Cup (football) =

Football tournament in Nepal

Tournament details
- Host country: Nepal
- City: Lalitpur, Kathmandu
- Dates: 23 February – 2 March
- Teams: 10
- Venue(s): ANFA Complex, Dasharath Rangasala

Final positions
- Champions: (Nepal) Machhindra F.C. (2nd title)
- Runners-up: (Nepal) New Road Team

Tournament statistics
- Matches played: 9
- Goals scored: 23 (2.56 per match)
- Top scorer: (Nepal) Sanjeeb Bista (2 goals)
- Best player: (Nepal) Sanish Shrestha
- Best young player: (Nepal) Bibek Gurung
- Best goalkeeper: (Nepal) Bishal Shrestha
- All statistics correct as of 2 March 2024.

The 2024 KP Oli Cup was the second edition of the KP Oli Cup, the domestic football tournament in Nepal. This year, a total of 10 teams participated in the competition.

The matches before the semifinals took place at the ANFA Complex in Satdobato, while the semifinals and final were hosted at the Dasharath Stadium.

== Participating teams ==
Team	Appearance	Previous best performance
(Nepal) Church Boys United	2nd	
(India) Delhi FC	1st	Debut
(Nepal) Jawalakhel Youth Club	2nd	
(Nepal) KP Oli FC	2nd	Semifinal (2023)
(Nepal) Machhindra F.C.	2nd	Champions (2023)
~~(Nepal) Manang Marsyangdi Club~~	~~2nd~~	
(India) Manebhanjyang Club FC	1st	Debut
Nepal Police Club	2nd	
Nepal Army Club	2nd	Semi-Final (2023)
(Nepal) New Road Team	1st	Debut
(Nepal) Three Star Club	2nd	

== Fixtures ==
Pre-quarterfinals
Church Boys United (Nepal)	0
KP Oli FC (Nepal)	3
Nepal Police Club	0 (4)
Tribhuvan Army Club (Nepal)	0 (3)

Quarterfinals
Jawalakhel YC (Nepal)	2
KP Oli FC (Nepal)	1
New Road Team (Nepal)	1
Three Star Club (Nepal)	0
Manebhanjyang FC (India)	3
Delhi FC (India)	1
Nepal Police Club	0
Machhindra F.C. (Nepal)	4

Semifinals
Jawalakhel YC (Nepal)	0
New Road Team (Nepal)	3
Manebhanjyang FC (India)	0
Machhindra F.C. (Nepal)	5

Final
New Road Team (Nepal)	0 (4)
Machhindra F.C. (Nepal)	0 (5)
