= Raju Kaji Shakya =

Nepalese footballer and coach

Raju Shakya
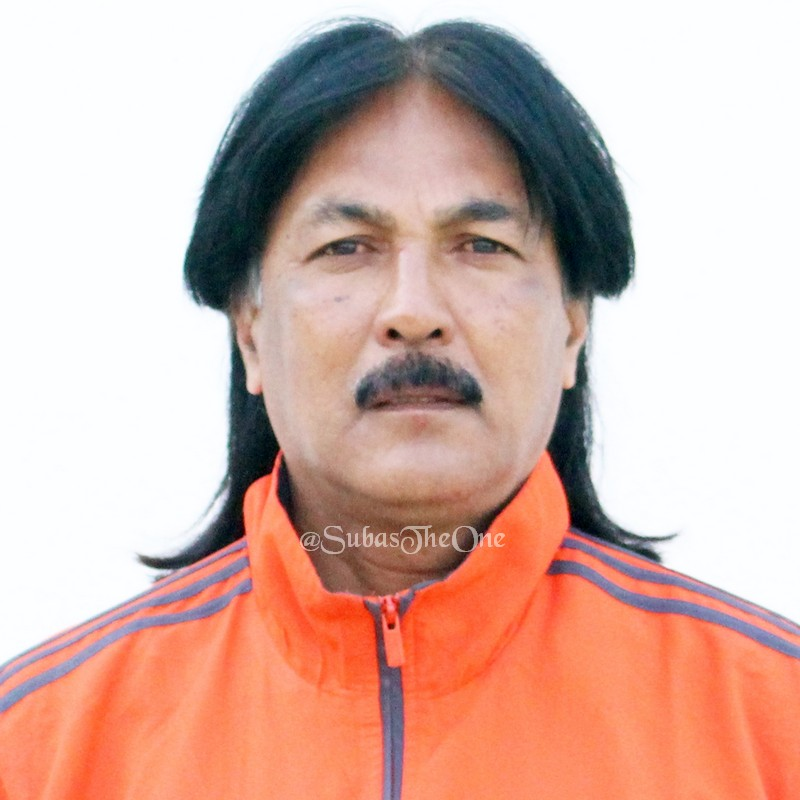

Personal information
- Full name: Raju Kaji Shakya
- Date of birth: 7 July 1960 (age 66)
- Place of birth: Dharan, Nepal
- Position: Defender

Senior career*
Years	Team	Apps	(Gls)
1975–1985	New Road Team		
1986–1988	Victoria SC		
1995–1997	East End Club		

International career
1981–97	Nepal	91	(0)

Managerial career
- 2004: Nepal u-14
- 2012–13: Machhindra
- 2012–13: Nepal u-20
- 2013–14: Nepal (Caretaker)
- 2014–2015: Three Star Club
- 2015–: Manang Marshyangdi Club
Medal record
Men's football
Representing Nepal
South Asian Games
Gold medal – first place	1984 Kathmandu	Team competition
Gold medal – first place	1993 Dhaka	Team competition
Silver medal – second place	1987 Kolkata	Team competition
Silver medal – second place	1999 Kathmandu	Team competition
Bronze medal – third place	1985 Dhaka	Team competition
- * Club domestic league appearances and goals

Raju Kaji Shakya (Nepali: राजुकाजी शाक्य) is a Nepalese football manager and former footballer who captained the Nepal national football team. He is the current manager of New Road Team. Born in July 1960 in Dharan, Nepal, he has also served as head coach of Nepal national football team .He has won Gold medals as a player, captain and a coach, Two Silver medals and one bronze medal for Nepal, in South Asian Games, (SAG Football). He is only a player to play 1st to 7th edition of South Asian Games, with many records in South Asian football.

== Career ==
Shakya started playing Professional football from 1975. His international career involved playing for the Nepal national football team from 1981 to 1997, where he served as captain from 1981 to 1997. Also, he has played professional football in Bangladesh league.

In 1987, Shakya led Nepal in three notable international friendlies, against USSR and East Germany in 1987 and West Germany in 1989.

== Coaching career ==
From 1991 to 1993, Shakya attended Futuro (a FIFA-accredited coaching course) as part of the Coca-Cola World Football Development Programme in Nepal. In 1998, he later gained an FA international coaching B-licence accredited by UEFA in England. 4 years later, Shakya gained further qualification with the AFC coaching C-licence in Nepal.

Shakya began coaching the Nepal national football team's U-14 squad for the 2004 AFC U-14 Football Festival. After this, Shakya attended a short-term course for football coaching accredited by the German NOC and German Football Association in Nepal (2004). Finally, 4 years later Shakya gained an international C-licence from the Japan Football Association in 2008.

In May 2013 Shakya extended his contract with Machhindra Football Club to continue as head coach so that he would remain in charge for the rest of the season.

In 2013, Shakya was appointed as the interim coach for Nepal national football team, until Jack Stefanowski was re-instated as head coach.

In October 2014 Shakya was appointed head coach of Three Star Club, which he took as defending champions to the 35th edition of the Governor's Gold Cup as defending champions. They however lost to Sikkim FA because of an extra time own goal.

In January 2015 Shakya was appointed head coach of Manang Marshyangdi Club replacing Nabin Neupane. Neupane wasn't sacked but rather will now act as Shakya's assistant coach for the upcoming 2014-15 Nepal Redbull national league.

He was appointed head coach of New Road Team.

== Honours ==
=== Club ===
- ANFA Cup (1): 1981
- Nara Trophy (1): Unknown
- Birthday Cup (1): Unknown
- Tribhuvan Challenge Shield (1): Unknown
- Mahendra Gold Cup (2): Unknown
- Amatay Gold Cup (1): Unknown
- Rupak Smirti Cup (1): Unknown
- Coco-Cola Cup Kathmandu (1): Unknown
- Tillotama Gold Cup (1): Unknown
- Mahatma Buddha Gold Cup (1): Unknown
- Bikash Running Cup (1): Unknown
- Karuwa Cup (1): Unknown
- Shahid Smarak A Division Football League (1): 1995
- National Games (1): Unknown
- Sikkim Governor's Gold Cup (4): 1981, 1990, 1991, 1992
- All India Brigade of Gurkha Gold Cup (1): 1982
- Sanjay Gandhi Gold Cup (1): 1983
- Jingmisingi Gold Cup (1): 1990
- Dhaka First Division Football League (1): 1995

=== National team ===
- South Asian Games Gold Medal (2): 1984, 1993
- South Asian Games Silver Medal (2): 1987, 1999
- South Asian Games Bronze Medal (1): 1985

=== Individual ===
- Most Valuable Player of the Year (1): 1992
- The Statesman Society Award (1): Unknown
- Player of the Year - Nepal Jaycees (1): 1993
- Player of the Year - Nepal Journalist Association (1): 1993
- Rupak Best Player Award - ANFA (1): 1996
- Lifetime Achievement Award - ANFA (1): 2005

== See also ==
- Hari Khadka
- All Nepal Football Association
