= 2014 ANFA Cup =

ANFA Cup 2071

Tournament details
- Country: Nepal
- Dates: 2 September – 10 September
- Teams: 8

Final positions
- Champions: Jhapa XI
- Runners-up: Sankata Boys S.C.

Tournament statistics
- Matches played: 7
- Goals scored: 14 (2 per match)

Awards
- Best player: Suman Lama
- Best goalkeeper: Dinesh Thapa Magar

2014 ANFA Cup was a knock-out tournament organized by the All Nepal Football Association. All matches were played at the Dasarath Rangasala Stadium in Kathmandu. 8 teams participated in the tournament. Jhapa XI won the title after defeating Sankata Boys SC in the finals.

== Participating teams ==
- APF Club
- Jhapa XI
- Manang Marshyangdi Club
- Morang XI
- Nepal Army Club
- Nepal Police Club
- Sankata Club
- Three Star Club

== Knock-out stage ==
Quarter-finals
2 September
Manang Marshyangdi	1
Jhapa XI	2
3 September
APF Club	1
Three Star Club	0
4 September
Nepal Army Club	2
Nepal Police Club	0
5 September
Sankata Club	1
Morang XI	0

Semi-finals
7 September
Jhapa XI	2
APF Club	0
8 September
Nepal Army Club	0
Sankata Club	1

Final
10 September
Jhapa XI	4
Sankata Club	0

== Matches ==
=== Quarter-final ===
2 September 2014	Manang Marshyangdi Club	1–2	Jhapa XI	Dasarath Rangasala Stadium, Kathmandu
13:00 NST	Deepak Rai 53'	Report	Bishal Rai 13', 68'	Attendance: 2000; Referee: Sudis Pandey

3 September 2014	APF Club	1–0	Three Star Club	Dasarath Rangasala Stadium, Kathmandu
13:00 NST	Ranjan Bista 90+3'	Report		Attendance: 2000; Referee: Bikash Mahat

4 September 2014	Nepal Army Club	2–0	Nepal Police Club	Dasarath Rangasala Stadium, Kathmandu
13:00 NST	Nawayug Shrestha 32'; Deepak Gurung 72'	Report		Attendance: 2500; Referee: Laba Khatri

5 September 2014	Sankata Club	1–0	Morang XI	Dasarath Rangasala Stadium, Kathmandu
13:00 NST	Barshat Gurung 51'	Report		Referee: Shrawan Lama

=== Semi-final ===
7 September 2014	Jhapa XI	2–0	APF Club	Dasarath Rangasala Stadium, Kathmandu
13:00 NST	Karna Limbu 22', 84' (pen.)

8 September 2014	Nepal Army Club	0–1	Sankata Club	Dasarath Rangasala Stadium, Kathmandu
13:00 NST		Report	Suman Lama 22'	Referee: Bikash Mahat

=== Final ===
10 September 2014	Jhapa XI	4–0	Sankata Club	Dasarath Rangasala Stadium, Kathmandu
13:00 NST	Naren Limbu 43'; Karna Limbu 76'; Bikash Rai 86'; Buddha Chemjong 88'	Report

== See also ==
- ANFA Cup
- ANFA League Cup
