= Anjan Bista =

Nepalese footballer (born 15 May 1998)

Anjan Bista अञ्जन विष्ट
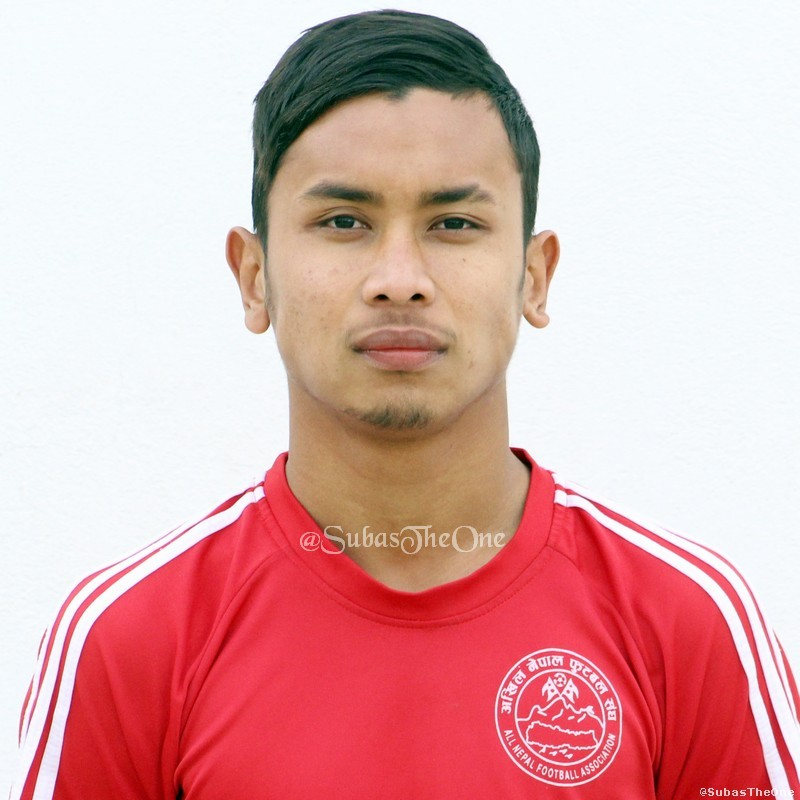
- Bista with Nepal in 2014

Personal information
- Full name: Anjan Bista
- Date of birth: 15 May 1998 (age 28)
- Place of birth: Hetauda, Nepal
- Height: 1.73 m (5 ft 8 in)
- Position: Forward

Team information
- Current team: New Road Team

Youth career
- 2011–2014: ANFA Academy
- 2016: Marbella

Senior career*
Years	Team	Apps	(Gls)
2015–2018	APF Club	14	(8)
2018–2022	Manang Marshyangdi	34	(16)
2021	→ Lalitpur City (loan)	8	(3)
2022	→ Jhapa (loan)		
2022–2023	Church Boys United	15	(7)
2023	Mumbai Kenkre	8	(1)
2023–2024	Jhapa	6	(1)
2024	Fortis FC	0	(0)
2024–2025	Church Boys United		
2025	Real Kashmir		
2025–2026	Brothers Union	5	(2)
2026	New Road Team		
2026–	Thunderbolts North United		

International career^{‡}
2013–2014	Nepal U17	5	(3)
2015–2018	Nepal U20	4	(3)
2016–2020	Nepal U23	5	(3)
2014–	Nepal	60	(13)
Medal record
Men's football
Representing Nepal
SAFF Championship
Runner-up	2021 Maldives
AFC Solidarity Cup
Winner	2016 Malaysia
South Asian Games
Gold medal – first place	2016 India
SAFF U-20 Championship
Winner	2015 Nepal
- * Club domestic league appearances and goals ‡ National team caps and goals as of 21 March 2024

Anjan Bista (Nepali: अञ्जन विष्ट; born 15 May 1998) is a Nepalese professional footballer who plays as a forward for New Road Team and the Nepal national team.

== Club career ==
During the 12th edition of the Aaha Rara Gold cup, playing for the ANFA Academy Bista scored the opening goal in the 17th minute to put his team 1–0 up against Nepal Police Club in Pokhara. However Ranjan Bista scored the equalizer in the 35th minute and the Police Club went on to win on a penalty shootout.

=== Nepal APF ===
Bista joined Nepal APF for the upcoming 2015 Nepal National League. He scored his first goal for the club in the second round in a 4–1 win over Morang XI. Anjan's brother Ranjan Bista scored two goals in the same match.

=== Marbella United FC, Spain ===
On 28 March 2016, Bista scored the only goal to defeat Nijmegen Eendracht Combinatie U-19 Academy 1–0. Anjan Bista showed brilliant performance during a match against ASC 09 Dortmund.

=== Manang Marshyangdi ===
In 2018, Anjan joined Manang Marshyangdi Club. In his first season, he scored five goals in the Pulsar Martyrs Memorial A Division League as the team won a record 8th league title. He was a member of the team that took part in the AFC Cup 2019 group stage.

In the 2019–20 Qatar Airways Memorial A Division League, Bista scored 6 goals in 8 appearances as the team finished third.

=== Church Boys United ===
On December 28, 2013, Church Boys United announced the signing of Anjan Bista in a one-year deal.

=== Mumbai Kenkre ===
On 21 January 2023, it was announced that Bista was sent on loan for remaining matches to Indian I-League club Mumbai Kenkre, as Mumbai Kenkre FC was in verge of getting relegated.

=== Jhapa FC ===
On 26 February 2023, Jhapa FC, one of the three new teams of the franchise-based Nepal Super League football tournament, recruited winger Anjan Bista as their marquee player for the second edition of Nepal Super League.

=== Fortis ===
On 8 March 2024, it was told that Bista joined Bangladesh Premier League club Fortis. However, he was sidelined for a couple of weeks when playing for Nepal in 2026 FIFA World Cup qualification – AFC second round. Eventually, the Bangladeshi club terminated his contract as he was set to miss most of the remaining matches of that season.

=== Brothers Union ===
In 2025, he joined Brothers Union for the 2025–26 Bangladesh Football League.

== International career ==
=== U-17 career ===
During the 2014 AFC U-16 Championship qualification Bista scored in a 2–0 victory over Bahrain, ending a six-year-long winning drought for the Nepali u-17 side. In the next game Bista scored the equalizing goal as Nepal came from 2–0 down to tie Iraq 2–2. Playing in the 2014 AFC U-16 Championship Bista started as Nepal scored a late equalizer to tie the match 1–1 against defending champions Uzbekistan. Bista was excellent in the next game against Kuwait, it was his early pressure that forced an own goal in the third minute, as well as it was Bista who was fouled in the box for the captain Bimal Magar to score the winning penalty.

=== U-20 career ===
In preparation for the 2015 SAFF U-19 Championship and the 2016 AFC U-19 Championship qualification campaign, Bista played in several friendlies in which he scored a hat trick against a senior Nepal Army Club earning a 4–2 victory. On the second match of the 2015 SAFF U-19 Championship, Bista converted a crucial penalty kick against Bangladesh. To which, the match was won 2:1. In the same tournament, Bista also scored a brace against Afghanistan in the semi-finals to register a 3:2 victory for Nepal sending the team into the finals. Nepal went on to win the final defeating India on penalty kicks.

=== Senior career ===
Bista made his international debut for Nepal on 31 October 2014 coming on for Sandip Rai in the 61st minute in an eventual 3–0 loss against the Philippines.

On 6 March 2015, Bista was selected for the 2018 FIFA World Cup qualification (AFC) 2-legged match against India. He was also one of the main players when Nepal won the Bangabandhu Gold Cup in Bangladesh and the gold medal in SAG Games. He scored 2 goals during the Gold winning run in the 2016 SAG Games - one against Bhutan and one against Maldives in the semi-final. Bista has since been a prominent member of the Nepal senior team.

Bista scored his first international goals on 10 September 2019 in 2–0 victory against Chinese Taipei in the 2022 FIFA World Cup qualification in Taipei. Bista performed well against Australia earning praise from the commentator Andy Harper and Simon Hill from Fox Sports.

== Personal life ==
After the 2014 AFC U-16 Championship it was announced that Bista had plans to turn to singing. Soon after a video of Bista singing popular a Dashain song was released. "This is a new taste for [me]. I really enjoy singing." said Bista afterwards thanking Kaarlrekha productions.

== Career statistics ==
=== Club ===
Season	Club	League	League		Other		Total	
Season	Club	League	Apps	Goals	Apps	Goals	Apps	Goals
2018-19	Manang Marshyangdi Club	Martyr's Memorial A-Division League	13	5	0	0	13	5
2018-19	Manang Marshyangdi Club	Total	13	5	0	0	13	5
2019-20	Manang Marshyangdi Club	Martyr's Memorial A-Division League	13	6	0	0	13	6
2019-20	Manang Marshyangdi Club	Total	13	6	0	0	13	6
2021	Manang Marshyangdi Club	Martyr's Memorial A-Division League	13	5	0	0	9	3
2021	Manang Marshyangdi Club	Total	9	3	0	0	9	3
Career total			35	14	0	0	35	14

=== International goals ===
Scores and results list Nepal's goal tally first.

#	Date	Venue	Opponent	Score	Result	Competition
1.	10 September 2019	Taipei Municipal Stadium, Taipei, Taiwan	Chinese Taipei	1–0	2–0	2022 FIFA World Cup qualification
2.	10 September 2019	Taipei Municipal Stadium, Taipei, Taiwan	Chinese Taipei	2–0	2–0	2022 FIFA World Cup qualification
3.	29 May 2021	Al Fayhaa Stadium, Basra, Iraq	Iraq	1–1	2–6	Friendly
4.	3 June 2021	Jaber Al-Ahmad International Stadium, Kuwait City, Kuwait	Chinese Taipei	1–0	2–0	2022 FIFA World Cup qualification
5.	2 September 2021	Dasharath Rangasala, Kathmandu, Nepal	India	1–0	1–1	Friendly
6.	4 October 2021	National Football Stadium, Malé, Maldives	Sri Lanka	2–0	3–2	2021 SAFF Championship
7.	13 October 2021	National Football Stadium, Malé, Maldives	Bangladesh	1–1	1–1	2021 SAFF Championship
8.	27 September 2022	Dasharath Rangasala, Kathmandu, Nepal	Bangladesh	1–0	3–1	Friendly
9.	27 September 2022	Dasharath Rangasala, Kathmandu, Nepal	Bangladesh	2–0	3–1	Friendly
10.	27 September 2022	Dasharath Rangasala, Kathmandu, Nepal	Bangladesh	3–0	3–1	Friendly
11.	16 November 2022	Dasharath Rangasala, Kathmandu, Nepal	Pakistan	1–0	1–0	Friendly
12.	21 June 2023	Sree Kanteerava Stadium, Bengaluru, India	Kuwait	1–3	1–3	2023 SAFF Championship
13.	12 October 2023	Dasharath Rangasala, Kathmandu, Nepal	Laos	1–1	1–1	2026 FIFA World Cup qualification

== Honours ==
Individual

- NSJF Sports Award 2016 Youth Player of the Year
