= 2011–12 Nepal National League =

Nepal National League
- Season: 2011–12
- Champions: Nepal Police Club (1st title)
- 2012 AFC President's Cup: Nepal Police Club
- Matches: 45
- Goals: 117 (2.6 per match)
- Top goalscorer: Nawayug Shrestha (Nepal Army Club) (7 goals)
- Biggest home win: 5 goals Sangam Club 0-5 Manang Marshyangdi Club; Three Star Club 6-1 Mitra Milan Club
- Highest scoring: 8 goals Manang Marshyangdi Club 6-2 Mitra Milan Club; Nepal Army Club 6-2 Mitra Milan Club
- Longest winning run: 6 games (Nepal Police Club)
- Longest unbeaten run: 9 games (Nepal Police Club)
- Longest winless run: 9 games (Mitra Milan Club)

A total of 10 teams competed in the 2011–12 Nepal National League. The season began on 30 December 2011 and concluded on 22 January 2012.

Nepal Police Club won the league and Nawayug Shrestha of the Nepal Army Club was the top scorer, with 7 goals.

== League table ==
Pos	Team	Pld	W	D	L	GF	GA	GD	Pts	Qualification
1	Nepal Police Club (C)	9	6	3	0	14	3	+11	21	Qualification for 2012 AFC President's Cup
2	Himalayan Sherpa Club	9	6	1	2	14	8	+6	19	
3	Manang Marshyangdi Club	9	5	2	2	17	6	+11	17	
4	Jawalakhel Youth Club	9	5	1	3	11	9	+2	16	
5	Nepal Army Club	9	4	1	4	16	9	+7	13	
6	Three Star Club	9	3	4	2	11	6	+5	13	
7	Ranipokhari Corner Team	9	4	1	4	11	8	+3	13	
8	New Road Team	9	3	2	4	7	9	−2	11	
9	Sangam Club	9	1	0	8	8	30	−22	3	
10	Mitra Milan Club	9	0	1	8	8	29	−21	1	

Updated to match(es) played on 4 May 2013. Source:
Rules for classification: 1) points; 2) goal difference; 3) number of goals scored.
(C) Champions

== Top scorers ==
Rank	Player	Club	Goals
1	(Nepal) Nawayug Shrestha	Nepal Army Club	7
2	(Nepal) Ganesh Lawati	APF Club	6
3	(Nepal) Santosh Sahukhala	Manang Marshyangdi Club	5
3	(Nepal) Jumanu Rai	Nepal Police Club	5
5	(Nepal) Subarna Limbu	Mitra Milan Club	4
