= Birat Gold Cup =

- Founded: 2012 (reinstituted as Birat Gold Cup)
- Region: Nepal
- Number of teams: Various
- Current champions: Biratnagar City (1st title)
- Most successful club(s): Himalayan Sherpa Club; Jhapa XI; Nepal Police Club; Sankata Club (1 title each)
- Television broadcasters: GoalNepal (YouTube)

Birat Gold Cup (Nepali: विराट गोल्डकप, previously called the Mahendra Gold Cup) is an annual football tournament held in Biratnagar, the second largest metropolitan city of Nepal. It has been held at the Sahid Rangasala stadium since 2012. The event witnesses participation from several national and international teams, and is among the most prestigious football tournaments of the nation.

The tournament for the year 2077 B.S. (2021 A.D.) saw a total of 10 participating teams from only 2 nations (Nepal and India). In the 2023 edition, Nepal Super League team Biratnagar City won the title, defeating the visiting Indian Kerala Premier League Luca Soccer Club 4–0.

== History ==
Birat Gold Cup football tournament began in the initial years as Mahendra Gold Cup and was named after late King Mahendra. Mahendra Gold Cup 2004 was held in Biratnagar. In 2012, Mahendra Gold Cup was renamed to Birat Gold Cup.

== 2015 Birat Gold Cup ==
2015 Birat Gold Cup was planned with an estimated budget NRs 7.7 million. Tribhuwan Army Club and Jhapa XI reached the final of the tournament. Jhapa XI defeated Tribhuwan Army Club 2–1 to clinch the title.

== 2016 Birat Gold Cup ==
2016 Birat Gold Cup was hosted on Sahid Rangsala, Biratnagar by Morang Football Club. In the final match, Nepal Police Club clinched title victory by defeating Jhapa XI 1–0 when Bharat Shah scored the only goal of the match. Shah found the post wide open when Jhapa XI goalkeeper Binay Shrestha went on to clear the ball in the 87th minute. Suman Subedi of Nepal Police Club was adjudged Player of the Tournament.

== 2018 Birat Gold Cup ==
The 2018 Birat Gold Cup was scheduled for March 31 - April 9. The 10 participating teams were:

1. Thimphu FC, Bhutan
2. Nepal Army Club, Kathmandu
3. Mohammedan Sporting Club, India
4. Sashatra Prahari Bal Team, Kathmandu
5. Bangladesh Sporting Club, Bangladesh
6. Manang Marsyangdi Club, Kathmandu
7. Nepal Police Club, Kathmandu
8. Rumpum Jhapa 11, Jhapa
9. Three Star Club, Kathmandu
10. Rijalco Morang 11, Morang

== 2021 Birat Gold Cup ==
The 2021 Birat Gold Cup 10 participating teams were:

1. African Roots Association, Kathmandu
2. Nepal A.P.F. Club, Kathmandu
3. Biratnagar Metropolitan, Biratnagar
4. Gorkha Boys Club, Rupandehi
5. Machhindra Club, Kathmandu
6. Nepal Police Club, Kathmandu
7. Punjab Police FC, India
8. Sankata Club, Kathmandu
9. Siliguri United Football Club, India
10. United Sikkim Football Club, India

== 2023 Birat Gold Cup ==
The 2023 Birat Gold Cup 8 participating teams were:

1. APF Club
2. Nepal Army
3. Nepal Police
4. Biratnagar City F.C.
5. Druk Lhyaul
6. Jawlakhel Youth Club
7. Luca Soccer Club
8. Sankata F.C.

== Results ==
Season	Year (B.S.)	Year (A.D.)	Champions	Runners-up	Final score
1	2069	2012	Himalayan Sherpa Club	African United Club	1–0
2	2070	2013	Sankata Boys Sports Club	APF Club	1–0
3	2071	2015	Jhapa XI	[Nepal Army Club	2–1
4	2072	2016	Nepal Police Club	Jhapa XI	1–0
5	2074	2018	Three Star Club	Nepal Army Club	3–0
6	2077	2021	Armed Police Force Club	(India) Punjab Police FC	1–0
7	2079	2022	Biratnagar City FC	(India) Luca Soccer Club	4–0
8	2080	2024	Machhindra F.C.	Shangri-La Football Club	2–0

== Performance ==
Club	Champions	Runners-up
Jhapa XI	1	1
Biratnagar City FC	1	0
Himalayan Sherpa Club	1	0
Nepal Police Club	1	0
Sankata BSC	1	0
APF Club	1	1
Three Star Club	1	0
African United Club	0	1
Nepal Army Club	0	1
Punjab Police FC	0	1

== See also ==
- Aaha! Gold Cup
- Simara Gold Cup
- KP Oli Cup
- Pokhara Cup
- Budha Subba Gold Cup
- Jhapa Gold Cup
- Tribhuvan Challenge Shield
- ANFA Cup
