= Bimal Gharti Magar =

Nepalese footballer

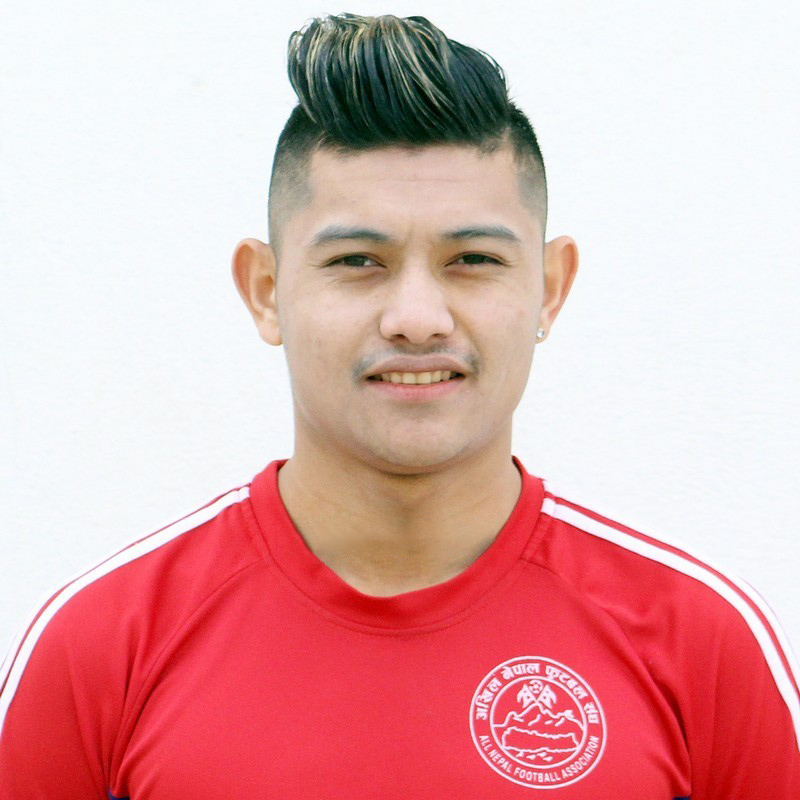
- Magar with Nepal in 2014

Personal information
- Full name: Bimal Gharti Magar
- Date of birth: 14 September 1997 (age 29)
- Place of birth: Nawalparasi, Nepal
- Height: 1.78 m (5 ft 10 in)
- Position: Forward

Team information
- Current team: Machhindra
- Number: 10

Youth career
- 2010–2013: Anfa Academy
- 2014–2015: Anderlecht
- 2015: Genk

Senior career*
Years	Team	Apps	(Gls)
2015–2016	Far Western FC	7	(4)
2016	Nepal Police Club		
2017–2018	Mohun Bagan	3	(0)
2018	Three Star Club		
2018	Chyasal Youth Club	5	(3)
2019	T.C. Sports Club	3	(3)
2020–	Machhindra F.C.		

International career
2012	Nepal U14		
2013–2014	Nepal U17	9	(13)
2015–2016	Nepal U20	5	(4)
2016–2020	Nepal U23	9	(3)
2012–2026	Nepal	44	(9)
Medal record
Representing Nepal
AFC Solidarity Cup
Winner	AFC Solidarity Cup	2016 Malaysia
South Asian Games
Gold medal – first place	South Asian Games	2016 India
SAFF U-20 Championship
Winner	SAFF U-20 Championship	2015 Nepal
- * Club domestic league appearances and goals

Bimal Gharti Magar (Nepali: विमल घर्ती मगर; born on 26 January 1997) is a Nepalese professional footballer who plays as a forward for Machhindra and the retired Nepal national team. Bimal is the product of Central ANFA Academy, which is controlled by the All Nepal Football Association (ANFA). Bimal is also the sixth youngest male scorer and international debutant in the world, making him the youngest Nepalese player to debut (at the age of 14) and score (at the age of 15) for the Nepal national team.

== Personal life ==
Magar was born in Nawalparasi, Panchanagar 1, Nepal and is from Bhutaha village in Nawalparasi. Magar's father, Hom Bahadur was also a footballer who played locally. It was his father and his childhood mentor who inspired Magar to take up football. Hom Bahadur's greatest wish was to see Magar play for the national team, but he died in a motorbike accident before Magar made it to the highest level. He broke the previous record of Bharat Khawas.

On 26 May 2016, while Magar was in Belgium, his sister was found dead in the home she shared with their mother. Her boyfriend was arrested, although the circumstances of her death remained unclear. He returned home, while in trial with a Belgian Club.

Bimal Gharti Magar married his girlfriend Leena Pradhan on 20 August 2023.

== Early career ==
Magar was selected by the All Nepal Football Association (ANFA) to join the ANFA Academy in Butwal after his performance for the Butwal Elite English School during the Subroto Cup, held in New Delhi. The Butwal Elite English School went on to win the tournament. Subsequently, that year, during the AFC U-14 Football Festival Magar was then transferred to the Central ANFA Academy, where he gained further attention by senior officials at ANFA. Which in turn, lead to Magar being included in the national team's squad during a friendly against Bangladesh at the age of 14.

== Club career ==
During November 2013, Magar was invited for a 2-week trial with the Dutch club, FC Twente where he scored 4 goals with 1 assist during a friendly match against HSC 21 U-19, which ended in a 9–0 victory for FC Twente U-16. However, due employment laws and FIFA regulations on youth transfers it was not possible to sign Magar at the age of 16, despite FC Twente being 'impressed' with his performance. It is also understood that at the time, Bimal was linked to Manchester United and Lierse SK.

In March 2014, Magar was granted a Belgian visa to go to Europe from April to May that year and run trials for Anderlecht's U-16 squad. As part of the trials, Magar also took part in three youth tournaments, AEGON Future Cup, the Ten Brinke Bouw Tournament, and the Nuenen Tournament. Both trials for FC Twente and RSC Anderlecht were carried out under the recommendation and oversight of Rene Koster, the former coach for the Bangladesh U-17 Team.

On 8 June 2014 Magar penned a new 1-year deal to join Anderlecht U-19. The ANFA confirmed that Magar's contract began from 26 July 2014, to 31 May 2015, with Anderlecht bearing all expenses. Bimal's first tournament with Anderlecht was the Copa del Agatha in St. Agatha, North Brabant, Netherlands. After scoring two goals, Bimal finished the tournament as a runner-up for RSC Anderlecht, losing 0–3 to Atletico Paranaense in the final. Bimal was absent during the 2014 Otten Cup due to a minor injury.

On 20 November 2014, Magar appeared in the 2nd Pathari Gold Cup for Church Boys FC, a youth football club in Nepal. To which, Magar scored the match winning goal in the opening match at the 23rd minute. The following month, alongside other Nepal U-17 teammates, Magar appeared in the 2014 BT Cup, a 7-a-side youth championship in Pokhara, under Lakeside FC. Magar led Lakeside FC to the title victory in the final of the 2014 BT Cup, which earned him the award of Most Valued Player in the tournament.

In December 2014, agent Louis de Vries (who was responsible for arranging Magar's youth appointment at Anderlecht) confirmed that Anderlecht could no longer keep Magar due to FIFA transfer regulations and EU work permit laws on non-European foreigners in Belgium. However de Vries also confirmed that Magar would join another elite Belgian club Racing Genk in January 2015 once his visa was approved.

On 7 January 2015, Magar participated in an international Pokhara football tournament, the Mankamana Cable Car Gold Cup under Rupandehi XI (Jagadamda Lumbini FC), a Butwal-based outfit set up by the Rupandehi District Football Association (an ANFA District FA). The first match was against Nepal Police Club, however the match ended in a penalty shootout with Nepal Police Club advancing into the second round.

On 15 January, Magar left for Belgium to commence his 2-month trial at KRC Genk's academy. The trial ended in time for Magar's international appearance for Nepal in the 2018 FIFA World Cup qualifiers.

After failing to clinch various domestic titles under Rupandehi XI, on 21 June, ANFA confirmed that Club Brugge KV will offer a trial to Magar this summer. On 3 June 2015, Magar acquired the Belgium visa and departed for the club on 5 June.

On 16 September 2015, Magar made his first full senior team debut at the Nepal National League under Far Western FC. Magar was awarded Man of the Match in his league debut.

On 26 February 2016, it was announced that Magar was offered a contract by Marbella United FC, an American soccer academy based in Spain. This was arranged by Louis de Vries. In the meantime, Bimal made an appearance for Nepal Police Club for the 2016 Birat Gold Cup. In May 2016 when he was in Belgium, he was linked to Belgian club KSC Lokeren but because of his sister's accident he returned to Nepal. In September, he joined Three Star Club and played in the Bordoloi Trophy. Three Star Club became champion. He scored a match winning goal in the final and became man-of-the-match in the final of the Bordoloi Trophy .

He joined Mohun Bagan for the second half of the 2017-18 season. He was released ahead of the Indian Super Cup. He made three appearances for the club and had one assist. After his release he joined his former club Three Star Club.

On 26 September 2018, he joined Chyasal Youth Club for the 2018–19 Martyr's Memorial A-Division League

On 19 July 2019 he joined TC Sports Club in Maldives for €75k.

Then he returned to homeland, this time representing Machhindra F.C., where he won two back to back league titles. He is currently playing his third season with the defending champions and is aiming for a hattrick of top flight title in three years.

== International career ==
In May 2012, Magar made his name for himself during the AFC U-14 Football Festival in 2012 for Nepal's under-14 football team, where he scored remarkable 8 goals including a hat-trick against Sri Lanka U14. After his performance under-14 coach, Sunil Shrestha, said "Bimal is one of the brightest prospects in Nepalese football".

On 20 September 2012, Magar made his international début for Nepal's senior team against Bangladesh in an international friendly at the Dasarath Rangasala Stadium. He became the youngest player ever to represent the country at the age of 14. Nepal national team coach, Krishna Thapa, said "He is a very young boy. He played well in the first match. I can't demand more from him in the first international match".

On 3 October 2012, the All Nepal Football Association (ANFA) selected 16 players under coach Bal Gopal Maharjan, which included Bimal, for Kizuna Project Japan's SAARC U-14 Football Exchange Program held in Shizuoka, Japan from 7–21 October. The side managed to beat the Maldives 4–0, Japan Football Academy 3–1, and registered a 4–0 victory over Pakistsan. The Nepal U-14 team maintained their winning momentum as they scored 6–0 against Sri Lanka, with Bimal scoring 4 goals including a hat-trick within 9-minutes of each other. Nepal returned home as group winners after winning all 4 matches in their group.

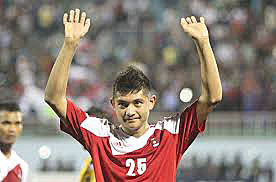
Bimal Gharti Agar in the 2013 SAFF Championship match at Pakistan

In 2013, Bimal competed at both the 2013 SAFF U-16 Championship and the 2013 SAFF Championship (national team), where he made his mark on both tournaments. In the SAFF U-17 Championship, Bimal finished the campaign as the tournament's highest scorer. Also, in the senior tournament, Bimal was the youngest player to appear and score at the SAFF Championship, having scored his first international goal against Pakistan in injury time to earn his side a 1–1 draw.

Later that year, Magar was selected as the skipper of Nepal for the 2014 AFC U-16 Championship qualification. Their campaign began with a selection match against Bahrain on 25 September 2013 at Dasarath Rangasala Stadium, Kathmandu, Nepal. The Junior Gorkhalis won the match 2–0, with one assist from Magar. He played the next match against Iraq and scored first goal for Nepal in a 2–2 draw. In the last match he scored a hat-trick in a 4–0 win against Turkmenistan. He ended the tournament with four goals as Nepal qualified for the 2014 AFC U-16 Championship in September. However, Magar accrued two yellow cards in the preliminaries, and hence was suspended for the opening match against Uzbekistan in the finals of the 2014 AFC U-16 Championship in Thailand. On top of this, Magar sustained several injuries during the South Korea friendly and Anderlecht's training sessions. Despite all this, he was still selected to start in all but 2 of Nepal's remaining games. In his first appearance in the tournament, Magar converted a penalty against Kuwait to win 2–1 in spite of enduring the ankle injury. As a result, Magar was awarded Man of the Match.

In late 2014, Magar was called up by Jack Stefanowski to play for Nepal U-23 in the 2014 Asian Games. However, due to the injury sustained at the 2014 AFC U-16 Championship, Magar was later ruled out of the final squad. Magar also participated in a friendly against the Philippines in Doha, Qatar.

On 6 March 2015, Magar was selected for the 2018 FIFA World Cup qualification (AFC) senior team (Nepal) 2-leg match against India. After failing to score, Nepal were knocked out at the first round with a 0-2 aggregate score.

On 18 March 2015, Magar was also called up into the U-23 Nepal squad for the qualifying stage of the 2016 AFC U-23 Championship and 2016 Summer Olympics.

On 27 July 2015, following Magar's trial for Club Brugge K.V., ANFA confirmed that the striker will participate in the 2015 SAFF U-19 Championship. On the opening match against Bhutan, Magar opened the scoresheet with a goal, followed by 2 more, routing Bhutan 3:1 with a hat-trick on his U19 debut. Despite picking up an injury, Magar started against India in the finals where he finished the tournament as joint-highest scorer (3 goals) along with teammate Anjan Bista as Nepal clinched title victory. On 4 October 2015, Magar scored a goal against Kuwait during the qualifying stage of the 2016 AFC U-19 championship.

During the SAFF Suzuki Cup 2015 in India, Magar scored his second goal for Nepal within 3 minutes against India, which became Nepal's only goal in the tournament, ending the 2-year goal drought. However Magar's match came to an end after he sustained an injury at half time.

Magar also featured in the 2016 Bangabandhu Cup in Bangladesh where he scored the match winning goal within 2 minutes against Sri Lanka, securing Nepal's first win in over 2 years. In this game, Magar was chosen as the Man of the Match. Magar provided an assist in the semifinal victory against Maldives, and finally Magar scored the opening and assisted one goal to win the title of 2016 Bangabandhu Cup for Nepal against Bahrain. This was the nation's first competitive title in 23 years, and Magar's 2nd title in less than 12 months. Magar was subsequently awarded Man of the Match.

=== Style of play ===
Magar is a pacey left-footed striker who is notable for his agility and acceleration. For this reason, he is often played as a forward, secondary striker, or winger. Magar is also technical in his finishing and shooting ability, as well as physical with tactical with off-the-ball intelligence and cuts. Overall, his professionality mentality has earned him a multitude of trials at various UEFA club academies and youth team place in Belgium giants Anderlecht, as well as earning the role as skipper in most of his national youth teams. Bimal has also been deployed as a central attacking midfielder, most notably in Nepal's win against Laos in the semifinals of the 2016 AFC Solidarity Cup.

=== International goals ===
Scores and results list Nepal's goal tally first.

#	Date	Venue	Opponent	Score	Result	Competition
1.	3 September 2013	Dasarath Rangasala Stadium, Kathmandu	Pakistan	1–1	1–1	2013 SAFF Championship
2.	27 December 2015	Trivandrum International Stadium, Thiruvananthapuram	India	1–0	1–4	2015 SAFF Championship
3.	13 January 2016	Bangabandhu National Stadium, Dhaka	Sri Lanka	1–0	1–0	2016 Bangabandhu Cup
4.	8 November 2016	Sarawak Stadium, Kuching	Brunei	3–0	3–0	2016 AFC Solidarity Cup
5.	12 November 2016	Sarawak State Stadium, Kuching	Laos	1–1	2–2	2016 AFC Solidarity Cup
6.	5 September 2017	ANFA Complex, Kathmandu	Tajikistan	1–2	1–2	2019 AFC Asian Cup qualification
7.	4 September 2018	Bangabandhu National Stadium, Dhaka	Pakistan	1–1	1–2	2018 SAFF Championship
8.	6 September 2018	Bangabandhu National Stadium, Dhaka	Bangladesh	1–0	2–0	2018 SAFF Championship
9.	29 January 2022	Dasarath Rangasala Stadium, Kathmandu	Mauritius	1–0	1–0	Friendly
Last updated 29 January 2022

== Career statistics ==
=== Club ===
Season	Club	League	League		Other		Total	
Season	Club	League	Apps	Goals	Apps	Goals	Apps	Goals
2015	Far Western FC	Nepal National League	7	4	0	0	7	4
2015	Far Western FC	Total	7	4	0	0	7	4
2017-18	Mohun Bagan	I-League	3	0	0	0	3	0
2017-18	Mohun Bagan	Total	3	0	0	0	3	0
2018-19	Chyasal Youth Club	Sahid Smarak league	5	3	0	0	5	3
2018-19	Chyasal Youth Club	Total	5	3	0	0	5	3
2021	Machhindra Football Club	Martyr's Memorial A-Division League	9	3	0	0	9	3
2021	Machhindra Football Club	Total	9	3	0	0	9	3
Career total			24	10	0	0	24	10

=== International ===
As of 5 September 2017

Nepal national team
Year	Apps	Goals
2012	1	0
2013	4	1
2014	4	0
2015	8	1
2016	9	3
2017	5	1
2018	5	2
2019	0	0
2022	2	1
Total	38	9

== Honours ==
=== Nepal U-16 ===
- SAFF U-17 Championship Runner-up (1): 2013

=== Nepal U-19 ===
- SAFF U-20 Championship Champions (1): 2015

=== Nepal U-23 ===
- South Asian Games Champions (1): 2016

=== Nepal National Team ===
- Bangabandhu Cup Champions (1): 2016

=== Nepal National Team ===
- AFC Solidarity Cup Champions (1): 2016

== Clubs ==
Three Star Club

- Bordoloi Trophy: 2016

Machhindra Football Club

- Martyr's Memorial A-Division League: 2019-20, 2021-22

Biratnagar City F.C.

- Birat Gold Cup: 2023

T.C. Sports Club

- Maldivian FA Charity Shield: 2019

== Trophys ==
Butwal Elite English School

- Subroto Mukherjee Cup: 2011

== Individual ==
- Sukriti Award: 2014
- Pulsar NSJF Sports Award Youth Player Of The Year: 2014

== See also ==
- Nepal national football team
- Nepal national under-17 football team
- Anjan Bista

Sporting positions
Preceded by Sulav Maskey	Nepal U-19 Captain; 2015–2016	Incumbent
Preceded by Hemant Thapa	Nepal U-16 Captain; 2013–2014	Succeeded by Manish Karki
