= Jitendra Karki =

Nepalese footballer

Personal information
- Full name: Jitendra Karki
- Date of birth: 26 August 1987 (age 39)
- Position: Defender

Team information
- Current team: Nepal Army Club

Senior career*
Years	Team	Apps	(Gls)
2010–2011	New Road Team		
2014-15	Manang Marshyangdi		
2015	Manang Marshyangdi		
2018	Nepal Army Club		
2018	Paro FC (Loan)		
2018-2021	Nepal Army Club		
2021	F.C. Chitwan (Loan)		
2021-23	Nepal Army Club		
2023-24	Sporting Ilam De Mechi FC	2	(0)
2024-	Nepal Army Club	6	(0)

International career
2012–	Nepal	3	(0)
- * Club domestic league appearances and goals as of 20 October 2024 @ 05:36(AEST)

Jitendra Karki (Nepali: जितेन्द्र कार्की) is a footballer from Nepal. He plays for Nepal Army Club in Martyr's Memorial A-Division League.

== International ==
He made his first appearance for the Nepal national football team in 2012.
