= 2005–06 Martyr's Memorial A-Division League =

Martyr's Memorial A-Division League
- Season: 2005–2006
- Champions: Manang Marsyangdi Club
- Relegated: Mahabir Club; Boudha FC
- 2006 AFC President's Cup: Manang Marsyangdi Club
- Top goalscorer: (Nepal) Rishi Rai (Nigeria) Junior Obagbemiro (27)
- Biggest win: Mahabir Club 0-8 APF Club
- Highest scoring: Ranipokhari Corner Team 8-9 Machhindra FC

The 2005–06 Martyr's Memorial A-Division League season, also known as the Martyr's Memorial San Miguel League for sponsorship reasons, was the 36th season of Nepal's top-tier A-Division League since its establishment in 1954/55. A total of 14 teams competed in the league. Manang Marsyangdi Club won the league. The season began on 26 August 2005 and concluded on 21 February 2006.

== Teams ==
APF Club made their debut in the league without being promoted before.

Team	Location	Previous Season
APF Club	Kathmandu	n/a
Nepal Police Club	Kathmandu	2nd
New Road Team	Kathmandu	7th
Tribhuvan Army Club	Kathmandu	4th
Machhindra Football Club	Kathmandu	? (promoted from Martyr's Memorial B-Division League)
Boys Union Club	Kathmandu	11th
Manang Marshyangdi Club	Kathmandu	3rd
Ranipokhari Corner Team	Kathmandu	10th
Sankata Club	Kathmandu	8th
Boudha FC	Kathmandu	? (promoted from Martyr's Memorial B-Division League)
Mahabir Club	Kathmandu	12th
Brigade Boys Club	Kathmandu	9th
Friends Club	Lalitpur	5th
Jawalakhel YC	Lalitpur	6th
Three Star Club	Lalitpur	1st

== League table ==
Pos	Team	Pld	W	D	L	GF	GA	GD	Pts	Qualification or relegation
1	Manang Marshyangdi Club (C)	28	21	5	2	84	20	+64	68	Qualification for 2006 AFC President's Cup
2	Three Star Club	28	19	6	3	65	18	+47	63	
3	Tribhuvan Army Club	28	19	4	5	67	30	+37	61	
4	Nepal Police Club	28	17	9	2	52	18	+34	60	
5	APF Club	28	13	7	8	53	31	+22	46	
6	New Road Team	28	12	8	8	51	33	+18	44	
7	Ranipokhari Corner Team	28	10	7	11	52	61	−9	37	
8	Sankata Club	28	10	4	14	46	56	−10	34	
9	Brigade Boys Club	28	10	2	16	51	68	−17	32	
10	Boys Union Club	28	7	7	14	37	67	−30	28	
11	Jawalakhel Youth Club	28	6	9	13	39	50	−11	27	
12	Friends Club	28	6	8	14	46	46	0	26	
13	Machhindra Football Club	28	7	5	16	33	59	−26	26	
14	Mahabir Club (R)	28	6	4	18	28	74	−46	22	Relegation to Martyr's Memorial B-Division League
15	Boudha FC (R)	28	2	5	21	26	80	−54	11	Relegation to Martyr's Memorial B-Division League

Updated to match(es) played on unknown. Source:
Rules for classification: 1) points; 2) goal difference; 3) number of goals scored
(C) Champions; (R) Relegated

== Match-fixing controversy ==
On matchday 27, relegation-threatened Machhindra FC faced Ranipokhari Corner Team. After the match ended 9-8 for Machhindra, allegations of match fixing rose, as Machhindra needed the win while RCT's Rishi Rai, who scored all eight goals, was on course to become the league's top goalscorer. While the analysis on the allegations never concluded, All Nepal Football Association did not award the top goalscorer award this season.
