= Sanish Shrestha =

Nepali footballer (born 2000)

Personal information
- Full name: Sanish Shrestha
- Date of birth: 9 November 2000 (age 26)
- Place of birth: Purkot, Nepal
- Height: 1.78 m (5 ft 10 in)
- Position: Right-back

Team information
- Current team: Machhindra

Senior career*
Years	Team	Apps	(Gls)
2018–2020	NIBL Friends		
2021–2023	Nepal A.P.F.	38	(3)
2023	Machhindra		
2023–2025	Lalitpur City	10	(0)
2024	Church Boys United		
2025–2026	Brothers Union	6	(1)
2026–	Machhindra	0	(0)

International career^{‡}
2023–	Nepal	24	(1)
- * Club domestic league appearances and goals ‡ National team caps and goals as of 7 November 2025

Sanish Shrestha (Nepali: सनिश श्रेष्ठ; born 9 November 2000) is a Nepalese professional footballer who plays as a right-back for Machhindra and the Nepal national team.

== Club career ==
Sanish, who joined Nepal A.P.F. in 2021 after making an impact with Friends Club in the A Division League, was named the league's best player in the 2023 season. He had also won the best defender award in the 2021 Birat Gold Cup.

At APF, he played as a right back and later shifted to a more central defensive role when the club's Ivorian center back Adama Doumbia was suspended due to a red card.

In 2025, he joined Brothers Union for the 2025–26 Bangladesh Football League.

== International career ==
On 22 March 2023, Sanish made his international debut for Nepal during a 2–0 victory over Laos in the 2023 Three Nations Cup.

Sanish scored his first international goal on 9 October 2025 against Vietnam during the 2027 AFC Asian Cup qualification at the Gò Đậu Stadium.

List of international goals scored by Sanish Sreshtha
No.	Date	Venue	Opponent	Score	Result	Competition
1.	9 October 2025	Gò Đậu Stadium, Hồ Chí Minh City, Vietnam	Nepal	1–1	1–3	2027 AFC Asian Cup qualification
