= U-18 ANFA Youth League =

- Organising body: All Nepal Football Association (ANFA)
- Country: Nepal
- Confederation: AFC
- Number of clubs: 12
- Level on pyramid: Youth (U-18)
- Current champions: Nepal Police Club (2024)
- Broadcaster(s): ANFA YouTube, ANFA Facebook
- Current: 2025 ANFA U-18 Youth League

U-18 ANFA Youth League (branded in some seasons as the Lalit Memorial ANFA U-18 Youth League) is an under-18 youth football competition in Nepal, organised by the All Nepal Football Association (ANFA) for the youth sections of clubs competing in the Martyr's Memorial 'A' Division League. Matches are played at the ANFA Complex in Satdobato, Lalitpur.

== Format ==
The league features 12 'A' Division clubs, whose youth teams play each other twice in a double round-robin format. Three points are awarded for a win and one for a draw, with the team topping the table declared champions. Eligibility is restricted to players within a specified birth-year window set by ANFA for each edition.

Prize money in the 2024 edition consisted of NPR 100,000 for the champions and NPR 50,000 for the runners-up, with individual awards of NPR 15,000 each for the tournament's Most Valuable Player, top scorer and best goalkeeper. ANFA also provided participating clubs with preparation funding.

== History ==
The 2024 edition was contested under the name "Lalit Memorial ANFA U-18 Youth League", organised in memory of Lalit Krishna Shrestha, and began on 14 July 2024 at the ANFA Complex. Twelve clubs took part: APF Football Club, Church Boys United, FC Khumaltar, Jawalakhel Youth Club, Machhindra Football Club, Manang Marsyangdi Club, Nepal Police Club, New Road Team, Sankata Club, Satdobato Youth Club, Three Star Club and Nepal Army F.C. formally known as Tribhuvan Army Football Club.

The 2024 season concluded on 31 December 2024. Nepal Police Club were confirmed as champions on 24 December after a win over Church Boys United, before finishing the 22-match season with a loss to New Road Team, who took second place. Sankata Club finished third. Nepal Police captain Subash Bam was the tournament's top scorer with 23 goals and received the golden boot, while Sankata's Krishna Bahadur Ale was named Most Valuable Player. Three Star's Ayushman Lo Tamang was named best goalkeeper, and Tribhuvan Army Football Club received the fair play award.

A further edition began in mid-2025, again featuring 12 'A' Division clubs playing a double round-robin.

== List of champions ==
Season	Champions	Runners-up	Third place
2024	Nepal Police Club	New Road Team	Sankata Club

== See also ==
- All Nepal Football Association
- Martyr's Memorial A-Division League
- Football in Nepal
