= Rupesh KC =

Nepalese footballer

Personal information
- Full name: Rupesh KC
- Date of birth: 13 May 1991 (age 35)
- Place of birth: Kathmandu, Nepal
- Height: 5 ft 7 in (1.70 m)
- Position: Midfielder

Team information
- Current team: Manang Marshyangdi)
- Number: 13

Youth career
- ANFA Academy
- Yeti Himalayan Sherpa Club

Senior career*
Years	Team	Apps	(Gls)
2005–	Manang Marshyangdi Club		
2015	→ Bhutan Clearing FC (loan)		

International career
2012	Nepal		(0)
- * Club domestic league appearances and goals

Rupesh KC (Nepali: रुपेश केसी; born 13 May 1991 in Kathmandu, Nepal) is a Nepali professional footballer. He plays for Manang Marshyangdi Club in Nepal National League as a midfielder. He also played for Nepal in the 2009 Nehru Cup.

== Club career ==
Rupesh KC started his career after spending a year at the ANFA academy before joining the Yeti Himalayan Sherpa Club for two years. He latter moved on to the Manang Marshyangdi Club.

On 2 July 2015 KC signed a month long loan deal with Bhutan Clearing FC, with the option of a second month. KC was joined by fellow MMC player Sujal Shrestha, as well as Surendra Thapa of Morang XI. The players will each be paid 64,000 rupees a month.

== International career ==
Rupesh KC played for Nepal at the U-13, U-14, U-19, and U-22 levels.

He was included for the squad for the 2009 Nehru Cup, playing in the first two games but his tournament was cut short by an eye infection.

== Personal life ==
Rupesh KC has a part-time job of an actor-model. In February 2015, he did a music video with famed Nepalese actress Priyanka Karki.
