= Cr7 Horaa =

Nepalese YouTuber (born 1998)

Sanjan Gautam
- सञ्जन गौतम
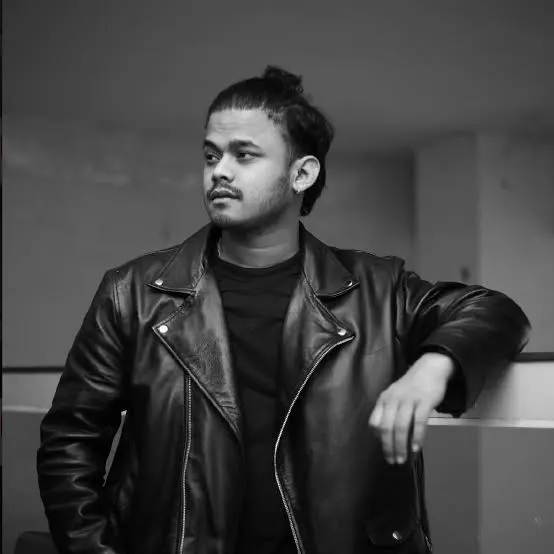
- Born: December 1, 1997 (age 28); Urlabari, Morang
- Spouse: Punam Khatri (m. 2025)

YouTube information
- Channel: cr7horaaYT
- Years active: 2019–present
- Genre: Gaming
- Subscribers: 1m subscribers
- Views: 109million
- Last updated: 28 April 2025

Sanjan Gautam (Nepali: सञ्जन गौतम) (born December 1, 1997), popularly known by his YouTube name CR7 Horaa, is a Nepali YouTuber, gamer, streamer and entrepreneur. One of the most popular streamers and Internet Personalities from Nepal with great popularity among youths, Gautam is also founder and owner of Horaa Esports.

Gautam is famous for his comedy and aggressive gameplays. He usually streams PUBG Mobile in his YouTube channel as well as in his TikTok account. He has also been featured in video of 'Badal Sari' by Swapnil Sharma's Swar & John Chamling Rai.

== Career ==
Gautam opened his YouTube channel on September 11, 2019, and set a record for the fastest Nepali YouTuber to reach 100k subscribers in 3-4 months, and now he is the fastest-growing streamers from Nepal with over 928K subscribers. He usually plays with his squad which includes his maternal uncle Ram Karki(mamaHoraa or kaloAringal), his best friend Sagar Limbu(LeembeyHoraaa), younger brothers Suraj Chettri(SekriHoraa or LeminoHoraa) and Deepak Phyual(SadeyHoraa) together known as Horaa Gang. They are famous for their bond, comedy and gameplay.

Gautam also believes in giving back to the community, and he uses the fame and fortune he has received as a result of the community to assist those in need. On his channel, he has done multiple charity broadcasts with well-known Nepalese personalities such as Balendra Shah, Vek, Yabesh Thapa, Anjan Bista and Nischal Basnet. He is owner of Horaa Esports and within a short span the team went on to become one of the leading gaming team representing Nepal in various Global Championships and participated 2024 PUBG Mobile Global Championship. However, they did not make it to the finals.

Gautam is a supporter of the English club Manchester United F.C. and a fan of the Portuguese footballer Cristiano Ronaldo. He married his longtime girlfriend, Punam Khatri on March 3, 2025.
