= Sujal Shrestha =

Nepalese footballer (born 1992)

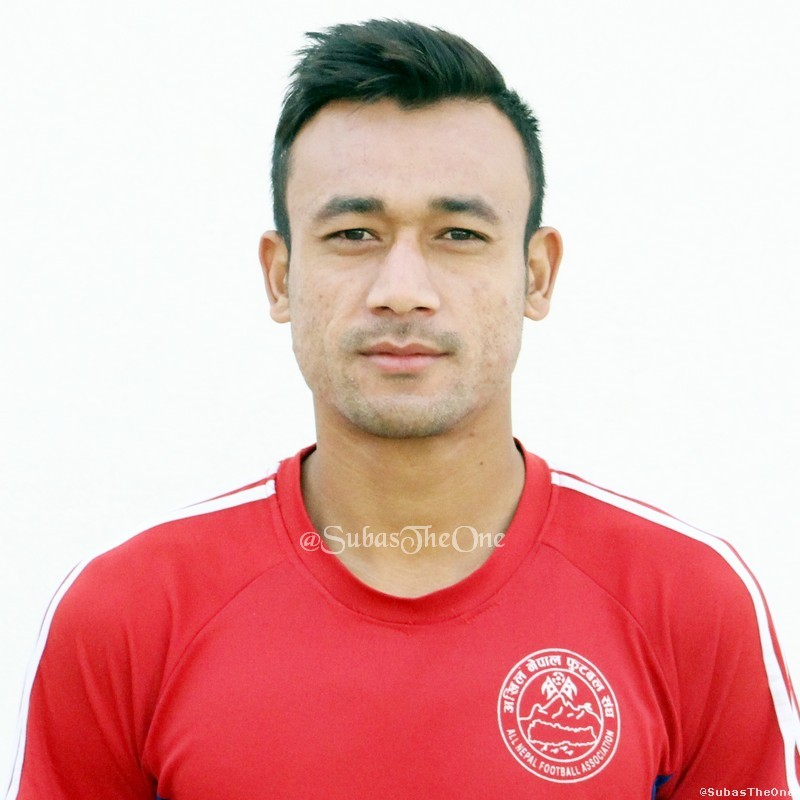
- 2014 by Subas Humagain

Personal information
- Date of birth: 5 February 1992 (age 34)
- Place of birth: Dhankuta, Nepal
- Height: 5 ft 11 in (1.80 m)
- Position: Left winger

Senior career*
| Years | Team | Apps | (Gls) |
| 2011–2023 | Manang Marshyangdi | | |
| 2015 | → Bhutan Clearing F.C. (loan) | 2 | (4) |

International career
| 2011–2023 | Nepal | 47 | (3) |
- * Club domestic league appearances and goals

Sujal Shrestha (Nepali: सुजल श्रेष्ठ) (born 5 February 1992) is a Nepali professional footballer who plays as a left winger. He represented the Nepal national team internationally and was part of Nepal's squad for the 2014 FIFA World Cup qualifiers.

== Club career ==
Shrestha was born in Dhankuta. After graduating from ANFA Academy in 2006 he joined the Sankata Boys Sports Club a year later, he then signed for the Manang Marshyangdi Club in 2008.

Shrestha scored the equalizing goal in an AFC President's Cup match against FC HTTU. Manang Marshyangdi though lost the match 3–1.

Shrestha played for Manang Marshyangdi Club at the 35 edition Governor's Gold Cup. On 19 October Shrestha scored a penalty kick in the semifinals in a 3–1 win over Sikkim FA. On 21 October in the final against ONGC F.C. Shretha scored another penalty kick after Cederic Aba was brought down in the box, and then set up Zikahi Dodoz for MMC's second goal as they came from 2–0 down to tie 2-2. MMC however would go on to lose the match on penalty kicks.

In the group stage match of the 2014 Aaha! Rara Gold Cup Shrestha scoring in the seventh twice in an eventual 7–0 win over Kanchanjunga FC of Sikkim, India.

On 2 July 2015, Shrestha signed a monthlong loan deal with CFC Bhutan, with the option of a second month. Shrestha is joined by fellow MMC player Rupesh KC as well as Surendra Thapa of Morang XI. The players will each be paid 64,000 rupees a month. On 25 July 2015, he scored his first goal with brace for CFC Bhutan as they beat Paro United FC 3–1. On 2 August 2015, he accelerated his goalscoring ability and scored twice in Bhutan national league for CFC Bhutan against FC Tertons as game remained stalemate.

== International career ==
Shrestha made his debut for the Nepal national team against Bhutan at Pokhara in 2011. He scored his first international goal in a 5–0 world qualifier match victory against Timor-Leste. He also played for Nepal at the 2012 Nehru Cup. In 2016, he scored second goal for Nepal against Macau in 2016 AFC Solidarity Cup. Shrestha's third international goal came against African nation Mauritius in 2022 international friendly.

On 23 March 2023, Shrestha announced his retirement from international football.

== Career statistics ==
Scores and results list Nepal's goal tally first.

| # | Date | Venue | Opponent | Score | Result | Competition |
|---|---|---|---|---|---|---|
| 1. | 2 July 2011 | Dasarath Rangasala Stadium, Kathmandu | Timor-Leste | 5–0 | 5–0 | 2014 FIFA World Cup qualifier |
| 2. | 15 November 2016 | Sarawak stadium, Kuching | Macau | 1–0 | 1–0 | 2016 AFC Solidarity Cup |
| 3. | 1 February 2022 | Dasharath Stadium, Kathmandu | Mauritius | 1–0 | 1–0 | Friendly |
