= ANFA Cup =

- Founded: 1980
- Region: Nepal
- Current champions: (Nepal) Jhapa XI
- Most championships: (Nepal) Jhapa XI (China) Guangdong (2 titles each)
- Website: Official website
- 2025 ANFA Cup

The ANFA Cup refers to a series of invitational knockout football tournaments organised by the All Nepal Football Association (ANFA). Both national teams as well as clubs participated in the past.

== History ==
Although Nepal had been playing football with the teams of various neighboring countries, the necessity for competitive matches was realized and the ANFA Cup was introduced. In the first edition in 1979, Kathmandu XI team was the winner in Chaitra. It was also held as the ANFA President Shield, in which Three Star Club secured the first position in 1981.

== Series ==
Year	Winner	Runner-up	Score	Comment
1980	(Nepal) Kathmandu XI	Unknown	Unknown	1st ANFA Cup
1981	(China) Shandong	(Bangladesh) Arambagh KS	5–1	2nd ANFA Cup
1982	(China) Kunming Army Unit	Nepal	3–1	ANFA Coca-Cola Invitational Tournament
1983	(China) Sichuan	India	3–0	
1984	(China) Guangdong	Nepal	1–0	
1985	(United States) Brooklyn College	Tibet	2–0	
1986	(China) Guangdong	Nepal	3–1	
1987	Nepal	(United States) East-West	2–2 (a.e.t.); 3–2 (pen.)	
1988	Not held			
1989	(Soviet Union) Uralmash Sverdlovsk	Nepal	2–0	
1998				ANFA Coca Cola Invitational Tournament
1999	(Nepal) Mahendra Police	(Nepal) Tribhuvan Army	1–0	National League Cup
2000	(South Korea) Soongsil	Nepal Red*	2–0	ANFA Coca Cola Invitational Tournament
2009	Nepal Red*	Sri Lanka	4–2 (pen.)	Prime Minister's Invitational Tournament
2010	—	—	—	Youth tournament: HISSAN Cup
2014	(Nepal) Jhapa XI	(Nepal) Sankata Boys SC	4–0	Domestic tournament

*Selection of Nepalese players, effectively a full national team.

== See also ==
- Football in Nepal
- Pokhara Cup
- Aaha! Gold Cup
- Simara Gold Cup
- Budha Subba Gold Cup
- KP Oli Cup
- Jhapa Gold Cup
- Tribhuvan Challenge Shield
