= Jhapa Gold Cup =

Nepal football tournament

- Founded: 2016
- Region: Nepal
- Teams: 10 (2026)
- Current champions: Machhindra Football Club (7th edition)
- Most championships: Nepal Army Football Club (4 titles)
- Website: www.jhapagoldcup.com
- 2026 Jhapa Gold Cup

Jhapa Gold Cup (Nepali: झापा गोल्डकप) is an annual football tournament held in Birtamod, Jhapa District, Nepal. The competition features participation from clubs in the Martyr's Memorial A-Division League as well as departmental and invited international teams. Matches are played at Domalal Rajbanshi Stadium.

The tournament has gained regional prominence for attracting large spectator attendance in eastern Nepal.

== History ==
The Jhapa Gold Cup has been organized by Jhapa XI Football Club since its establishment in 2016. The tournament features leading domestic clubs along with selected foreign teams from India, Bhutan and Malaysia. The inaugural edition was won by Tribhuvan Army Club. As of the seventh edition, Tribhuvan Army Club has won the tournament four times, while host team Jhapa XI has finished as runner-up on four occasions.

== Results ==
Title	Year (B.S)	Year (A.D)	Champions	Runners-up	Final score	Refs.
1st	2072	2016	Nepal Army Club	Jhapa XI	1–0	
2nd	2073	2017	Manang Marshyangdi Club	Jhapa XI	1–0	
3rd	2074	2018	Nepal Army Club	Jhapa XI	1–1 (8–7 on penalties)	
4th	2074	2019	Nepal Army Club	Jhapa XI	5–3	
5th	2078	2022	Nepal Army	Jhapa XI	2–1	
6th	2080	2024	Church Boys United	APF F.C.	3–0	
7th	2082	2026	Machhindra Football Club	APF F.C.	3–1	

== Editions ==
=== Third Edition (2018) ===
The third edition of the Jhapa Gold Cup was won by Tribhuvan Army Club, who defeated host team Jhapa XI in the final at Domalal Rajbanshi Stadium in Birtamod.

The final ended 1–1 in regulation time, with Karna Limbu scoring for Jhapa XI and Bharat Khawas equalizing for Army in the 86th minute. After a goalless extra-time period, the match was decided by a penalty shoot-out, which eventually went to sudden death. Tribhuvan Army Club secured victory with an 8–7 result in sudden death.

With the win, Army received NPR 1,250,000 as prize money, while Jhapa XI received NPR 600,000 as runners-up.

Army goalkeeper Bikesh Kuthu was named Best Goalkeeper, while Devendra Tamang and Santosh Tamang received Best Defender and Best Midfielder awards respectively. Jhapa XI’s Yogesh Gurung was named the Most Valuable Player of the tournament and received a motorcycle. Karna Limbu was the tournament’s highest goal scorer with three goals.

The tournament featured ten teams, including A-Division clubs and invited foreign participation.

=== Fourth Edition (2019) ===
The fourth edition of the Jhapa Gold Cup was won by Tribhuvan Army Club, who defeated host team Jhapa XI 5–3 in the final at Domalal Rajbanshi Stadium in Birtamod.

Santosh Tamang scored twice for Army, while Bharat Khawas, Nawayug Shrestha and Tek Bahadur Budhathoki added one goal each. Jhapa XI replied through Yogesh Gurung and foreign players Francis and Victor.

With the victory, Tribhuvan Army Club secured their third Jhapa Gold Cup title. The champions received NPR 1,250,000, while Jhapa XI received NPR 605,000 as runners-up.

Individual awards included:

- Best Player of the Tournament – Dilen Loktan (Jhapa XI)
- Best Goalkeeper – Bikesh Kuthu (Tribhuvan Army Club)
- Highest Goal Scorer – Nawayug Shrestha (Tribhuvan Army Club)
- Best Coach – Chun Bahadur Thapa (Tribhuvan Army Club)

A total of ten teams participated in the tournament, including departmental teams, A-Division clubs and invited foreign teams.

=== Fifth Edition (2022) ===
The fifth edition of the Jhapa Gold Cup, officially known as the First Mustang Bhadrapur-Jhapa Gold Cup, was won by Tribhuvan Army Club. In the final, Army defeated Jhapa XI 2–1 at Domalal Rajbanshi Stadium.

Tek Bahadur Budhathoki opened the scoring in the 18th minute, followed by a goal from George Prince Karki three minutes later. Jhapa XI reduced the deficit through Bimal Gharti Magar.

With the victory, Tribhuvan Army Club secured their fourth Jhapa Gold Cup title. The champions received NPR 1,255,000, while runners-up Jhapa XI received NPR 605,000.

Individual awards included:

- Most Valuable Player – Devendra Tamang (Jhapa XI)
- Highest Goal Scorer – Bimal Gharti Magar (5 goals)
- Best Goalkeeper – Bikesh Kuthu (Tribhuvan Army Club)
- Best Defender – Manoj Rai (Jhapa XI)
- Best Midfielder – Andres Nia (Jhapa XI)
- Best Coach – Nabin Neupane (Tribhuvan Army Club)

The tournament featured ten teams, including clubs from Nepal and India. The opening ceremony was attended by former Prime Minister KP Sharma Oli.

=== Sixth Edition (2024) ===
The sixth edition was won by Church Boys United after defeating APF Football Club 3–0 in the final. Nigerian forward Abayomi Oluwaseun Fakunle scored twice in the final.

Church Boys United remained unbeaten throughout the tournament and received NPR 1,300,000 as prize money, while APF FC received NPR 700,000.

Individual awards included:

- Best Goalkeeper – Deep Karki (Church Boys United)
- Best Defender – Serge Dika (Church Boys United)
- Best Forward & Highest Scorer – Abayomi Oluwaseun Fakunle
- Best Midfielder – Sharan Basnet (APF FC)
- Best Player of the Tournament – Sanjit Rai (Church Boys United)

=== Seventh Edition ===
The seventh edition of the Jhapa Gold Cup, officially titled the Binod Basnet Memorial edition, was held in Birtamod. Machhindra Football Club won their first Jhapa Gold Cup title after defeating APF Football Club 3–1 in the final.

Machhindra took the lead in the 31st minute through Pradeep Budhathoki. In first-half stoppage time, Frank Anoh doubled the advantage, giving Machhindra a 2–0 lead at the break. APF were reduced to ten players in the 76th minute after Man Bahadur Rana Magar was sent off. Dipesh Dhimal scored in the 82nd minute to reduce the deficit for APF, but Machhindra restored their two-goal advantage a minute later when Alison Alizonov headed in from a corner to secure the victory.

With the title, Machhindra received NPR 1,500,000 along with the trophy, while APF received NPR 750,000 as runners-up. The edition featured the highest prize money in the tournament’s history up to that point.

Pradeep Budhathoki was named Player of the Match in the final. Pema Tamang was awarded the tournament’s Best Player and received a motorcycle. Other individual awards included Best Goalkeeper (Bishal Shrestha), Best Coach (Pravesh Katwal), and Top Scorer (Jonathan Zorilla).

The tournament featured participation from Nepali departmental teams and A-Division clubs, along with invited teams from India, Bhutan, and Malaysia. The edition was dedicated to the memory of former Gold Cup Management Committee chairperson Binod Basnet.

== Format ==
The tournament typically features 8–10 teams, including:

- Host team Jhapa-11
- Martyr's Memorial A-Division League clubs
- Departmental teams such as Nepal Army, Nepal Police and APF
- Invited international clubs

The competition is played in a knockout format.

== Venue ==
All matches are held at Domalal Rajbanshi Stadium in Birtamod, Jhapa District.

== Prize Money ==
Prize money has increased in recent editions:

Edition	Winner	Runner-up
3rd	NPR 1,200,000	NPR 600,000
4th	NPR 1,250,000	NPR 605,000
5th	NPR 1,255,000	NPR 605,000
6th	NPR 1,300,000	NPR 700,000
7th	NPR 1,500,000	NPR 750,000

== Performance ==
Club	Champions	Runners-up
Nepal Army Club	4	0
Church Boys United	1	0
Manang Marshyangdi Club	1	0
Machhindra Football Club	1	0
Jhapa XI	0	5
APF F.C.	0	2

== See also ==
- Pokhara Cup
- Aaha! Gold Cup
- Simara Gold Cup
- Budha Subba Gold Cup
- KP Oli Cup
- Tribhuvan Challenge Shield
- ANFA Cup
