= Jagajeet Shrestha =

Nepali footballer (born 1993)

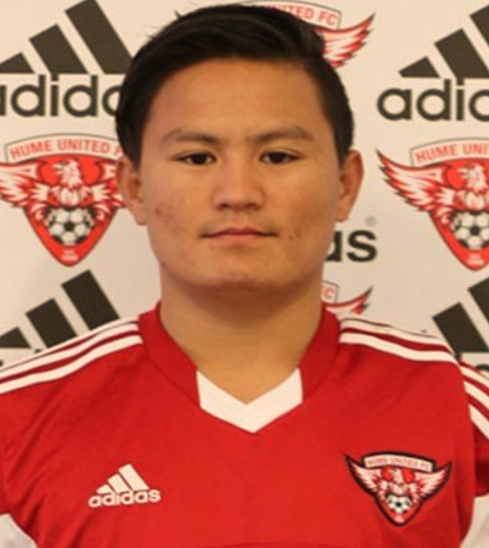
- Shrestha with Hume United in 2016

Personal information
- Full name: Jagajeet Shrestha (जगजीत श्रेष्ठ)
- Date of birth: 7 August 1993 (age 33)
- Place of birth: Bhaktapur, Nepal
- Height: 5 ft 5 in (1.65 m)
- Position: Midfielder

Team information
- Current team: Adelaide Croatia Raiders

Senior career*
Years	Team	Apps	(Gls)
2011–2012	Himalayan Sherpa Club		(25)
2012–2013	Friends Club		
2013–2016	Three Star Club		
2016	Hume United	3	(3)
2017	Sunshine George Cross	15	(4)
2017	Nunawading City	10	(1)
2018	Preston Lions	8	(2)
2020	Para Hills Knights	14	(1)
2021	South Adelaide Panthers	0	(0)
2021–	Adelaide Croatia Raiders	14	(1)

International career^{‡}
	Nepal	26	(1)
- * Club domestic league appearances and goals as of 3 November 2021 ‡ National team caps and goals as of 27 December 2015

Jagajeet Shrestha (Nepali: जगजीत श्रेष्ठ) is a Nepali footballer who last played for Preston Lions in State League 1 as a midfielder. He was called to Nepali internationals at the 2014 FIFA World Cup qualifiers and most recently for the 2019 Asian Cup Qualifiers in late 2017.

== Club career ==
Jagajeet Shrestha was born in Bhaktapur, a sub district of Kathmandu in 1993. He soon developed a reputation for his skills and fiery style of play despite his short height. He started his career at Yeti Himalayan Sherpa Club scoring 25 goals.

In 2011, VfB Stuttgart agreed to a 1-year deal to train Shrestha.

In 2012, Shrestha moved on to Friends Club, and in 2013 transferred to the Three Star Club.

In June 2014 Shrestha secured a 2-month trial with the Polish football club, Jagiellonia Białystok.

He played for Three Star Club before signing an 18-month contract with Hume United FC. He scored two goals for Hume United FC in his debut match against Sporting. After showing potential many clubs keep an eyes on him but Sunshine George Cross signed him a year deal. He was instrumental in his team's displays early in the season.

After moves to Nunawading City & Preston Lions, Jagajeet is currently a free agent.

== International career ==
Shrestha represented Nepal at the U13, U14, U16, and U19 levels. He has also represented his country at the 2011 SAFF Championship, 2012 Nehru Cup, 2014 FIFA World Cup qualifiers, and the 2013 SAFF Championship. He scored his only goal so far in a 5-0 world qualifier match victory against Timor-Leste.

=== International goals ===
Scores and results list Nepal's goal tally first.

#	Date	Venue	Opponent	Score	Result	Competition
1.	2 July 2011	Dasarath Rangasala Stadium, Kathmandu	Timor-Leste	4–0	5–0	2014 FIFA World Cup qualifier
