= Shiva Shrestha (footballer) =

Nepali football player

Personal information
- Date of birth: 18 March 1992 (age 34)
- Place of birth: Pokhara, Nepal
- Height: 5 ft 7 in (1.70 m)
- Position: Midfielder

Senior career*
Years	Team	Apps	(Gls)
2010–2014	Manang Marshyangdi		

International career
2011	Nepal U-23		
2011	Nepal	4	(0)
- * Club domestic league appearances and goals

Shiva Shrestha (Nepali: शिव श्रेष्ठ; born 18 March 1992) is a Nepali professional football midfielder. He was called for the Nepal national football team in the 2014 FIFA World Cup qualifiers.

== Club career ==
After graduating from ANFA Academy, he joined Manang Marshyangdi Club. On 20 September 2014, Shrestha scored the equalizing goal in AFC President's Cup match against Air Force SC. Manang Marshyangdi went on to win the match 2–1. On 17 October 2014, Shrestha scored in a 2–0 victory against Indian Army XI at the Governor's Gold Cup. MMC lost in the final to ONGC F.C. on penalties. In the group stage match of the 2014 Aaha! Rara Gold Cup, Shrestha opened the scoring in an eventual 7–0 win over Kanchanjunga FC of Sikkim.

== International career ==
Shrestha played the two legs against Timor-Leste, but after Nepal's 9–0 loss to Jordan, he quit playing for the senior national team.

== Personal life ==
Shrestha initially considered quitting football and pursuing a career as a Gurkha after Nepal's humiliating 9–0 loss to Jordan in the 2014 FIFA World Cup qualifiers. However, he returned to play few months later.
