= Birthday Cup =

The Birthday Cup (also referred to as the Birendra Memorial Cup in the 2002 edition) was an association football competition organised to mark the birthday of King Birendra of Nepal in 1974. After the abolition of the Nepalese monarchy, the tournament has since been axed.

== Editions ==
Accurate as of 4 March 2016.

Year	Winner	Runner-up	Score
1982	(Nepal) Mahendra Police Club	(India) Darjeeling United	1–0
1985	(India) Darjeeling United		
2001	(Nepal) Ranipokhari Corner Team		
2002	(Nepal) Mahendra Police Club		
2005	(Nepal) Mahendra Police Club	(Nepal) Three Star Club	1–1 [5–4 pen]
