= KP Oli Cup (football) =

- Region: Nepal
- Current champions: Machhindra F.C. (2nd title)
- Most championships: Machhindra F.C. (2 titles)
- Broadcaster: Kantipur TV
- 2025 KP Oli Cup

The KP Oli Cup Football Championship is a football tournament in Nepal organised by the National Youth Federation Nepal. The tournament was named after Nepal's former Prime Minsiter KP Sharma Oli.

== See also ==
- 2024 KP Oli Cup
- Birat Gold Cup
- Aaha! Gold Cup
- Simara Gold Cup
- Pokhara Cup
- Budha Subba Gold Cup
- Jhapa Gold Cup
- Tribhuvan Challenge Shield
- ANFA Cup
