= Sushil KC =

Nepalese footballer

Personal information
- Full name: Sushil KC
- Date of birth: April 23, 1990 (age 36)
- Place of birth: Pokhara, Nepal
- Height: 5 ft 5 in (1.65 m)
- Position: Midfielder

Team information
- Current team: Manang Marshyangdi

Youth career
- ANFA Academy
- Friends Club

Senior career*
| Years | Team | Apps | (Gls) |
| 2010–2015 | Friends Club | | |
| 2015– | Manang Marshyangdi Club | | |

International career
- Nepal U14
- Nepal U16
| 2011–2013 | Nepal U23 | | |
| 2015– | Nepal | 2 | (0) |
- * Club domestic league appearances and goals

Sushil KC (born 23 April 1990 in Pokhara) is a Nepali footballer. He plays for Manang Marshyangdi Club in Nepal National League as a midfielder. He also played for the Nepal national football team making his debut against India on 31 August 2015.

== Career ==
Sushil KC graduated from the ANFA Academy in 2007. A couple of years later, he began his professional career by joining Friends Club, where he played for one season. He then moved to New Road Team (NRT), followed by spells at Machhindra Club and Manang Marshyangdi Club (MMC).

While playing for Machhindra Club, Sushil KC was recognized as the Best Midfielder of the League, highlighting his impact and consistent performance on the field.

== International career ==
Shushil KC has represented Nepal at the U10, U12, U14, U16, and U23 level and has also played for the senior national team. He plays as a midfielder and is known as one of the quickest players in the squad.

== Personal life ==
Sushil KC has a tattoo of Ganesha on his right arm.
