= Tanka Basnet =

Nepalese footballer (born 1990)

Personal information
- Full name: Tanka Basnet
- Date of birth: 13 December 1990 (age 35)
- Place of birth: Kathmandu, Nepal
- Position: Midfielder

Team information
- Current team: Nepal Army Club

Senior career*
Years	Team	Apps	(Gls)
2012–2021	Nepal Army Club	10	(5)
2021-22	Dhangadhi F.C.	7	(1)
2021-	Nepal Army Club	10	(0)

International career^{‡}
2012–	Nepal	3	(0)
- * Club domestic league appearances and goals as of 20 October 2024 @ 06:55(AEST) ‡ National team caps and goals as of 10:51, 25 March 2019 (UTC)

Tanka Basnet (Nepali: टंक बस्नेत; born 12 December 1990) is a footballer from Nepal. He made his first appearance for the Nepal national football team in 2012. He plays for Nepal Army Club in Martyr's Memorial A-Division League.
