= Karna Limbu =

Nepalese footballer

Personal information
- Full name: Karna Limbu
- Place of birth: Jhapa, Nepal
- Position: Striker

Team information
- Current team: Jhapa XI
- Number: 14

Senior career*
Years	Team	Apps	(Gls)
2012–2015	Machhindra Football Club		
2015–	Jhapa XI		(13)

International career
2012	Nepal	1	(0)
- * Club domestic league appearances and goals as of 13 April 2015

Karna Limbu (Nepali: कर्ण लिम्बु) is a Nepali football player, who most recently played for National League side Jhapa XI, and has also been capped for Nepal.

== Club career ==
=== Machhindra ===
In the second to last game of the 2014 Martyr's A League second division Limbu scored a late goal over Sankata Boys Sports Club which made him top scorer of the league with 11 goals and cemented second place for Machhindra.

=== Jhapa XI ===
In January 2015 along with several other former Machhindra players Limbu signed with Jhapa XI for the upcoming 2015 Nepal National League.

== International career ==
Limbu came on as a 75-minute substitute for Anil Gurung in a match against Yemen on 25 March 2014 in an eventual 2-0 defeat.

In December 2015, it was announced that coach Patrick Aussems had cut Limbu and three other players from the squad for the 2015 SAFF Championship.

== Personal life ==
Limbu hails from Chandragadhi in Jhapa District, and is the youngest of four boys. He met his future wife Bal Kumari after the latter was impressed by the former's skill at a local tournament. Together with Kumari whom he married when he was 20 he has two daughters.
