= Sanjeeb Bista =

Nepali footballer (born 2002)

Personal information
- Full name: Sanjeeb Bista
- Date of birth: 17 February 2002 (age 24)
- Place of birth: Kirtipur, Nepal
- Height: 1.80 m (5 ft 11 in)
- Positions: Striker; attacking midfielder

Team information
- Current team: Church Boys United
- Number: 9

Senior career*
| Years | Team | Apps | (Gls) |
| 2022–2023 | Bijaychowk Youth Club | | |
| 2021–2022 | New Road Team | 22 | (6) |
| 2023–2024 | → Pokhara Thunders (loan) | 10 | (1) |
| 2024- | Church Boys United | 1 | (0) |

International career^{‡}
| 2024– | Nepal | 4 | (1) |
- * Club domestic league appearances and goals as of 19 October 2024 @ 13:17(AEST) ‡ National team caps and goals as of 11 June 2024

Sanjeeb Bista (Nepali: सञ्जीव विष्ट; born 17 February 2002) is a Nepalese professional footballer who plays as a striker for Church Boys United and the Nepal national team.

== Early career ==
Before participating in the 2021 C-Division League qualifiers, Sanjeeb had played football tournaments in school and local tournaments but had not received any formal training. During the qualifiers, he scored a notable goal against Jhapa FC to earn MUFC Bijaychowk Youth Club the victory, which eventually led to him being called up to the preliminary Nepal national under-23 team squad for the 2022 AFC U-23 Asian Cup qualifiers.

== Club career ==
On 29 November 2021, Sanjeeb made his debut for the New Road Team during goalless draw with Brigade Boys Club in the 2021–22 Martyr's Memorial A-Division League. On 28 April 2023, he scored the only goal as New Road Team defeated Three Star Club in the 2023 Martyr's Memorial A-Division League, helping the club move out from the relegation zone. Sanjeeb represented Pokhara Thunders in the 2023–24 Nepal Super League. On 7 December 2023, Sanjeeb scored the decisive goal against Sporting Ilam De Mechi to go top of the league table.

== International career ==
On 21 March 2024, Sanjeeb made his debut for the Nepal national team during a 0–5 defeat to Bahrain in the 2026 FIFA World Cup qualification – AFC second round. He scored his first international goal on 11 June 2024 against Yemen at the Prince Mohamed bin Fahd Stadium.

== Career statistics ==
=== Club ===
As of 23 December 2023.

| Club | Season | Division | League | | Other | | Total | |
| Club | Season | Division | Apps | Goals | Apps | Goals | Apps | Goals |
|---|---|---|---|---|---|---|---|---|
| New Road Team | 2021–22 | Martyr's Memorial A-Division League | 3 | 0 | 0 | 0 | 3 | 0 |
| New Road Team | 2023 | Martyr's Memorial A-Division League | 19 | 6 | 0 | 0 | 19 | 6 |
| New Road Team | New Road Team total | | 22 | 0 | 0 | 0 | 22 | 6 |
| Pokhara Thunders (loan) | 2023–24 | Nepal Super League | 10 | 1 | 0 | 0 | 10 | 1 |
| Career total | | | 32 | 7 | 0 | 0 | 32 | 7 |

=== International ===
As of 11 June 2024.

Nepal national team
| Year | Apps | Goals |
|---|---|---|
| 2024 | 4 | 1 |
| Total | 4 | 1 |

=== International goals ===
Scores and results list Nepal's goal tally first.

| No. | Date | Venue | Opponent | Score | Result | Competition |
|---|---|---|---|---|---|---|
| 1. | 11 June 2024 | Prince Mohamed bin Fahd Stadium, Dammam, Saudi Arabia | Yemen | 1–1 | 2–2 | 2026 FIFA World Cup qualification |
