= Bikram Lama =

Nepalese professional footballer

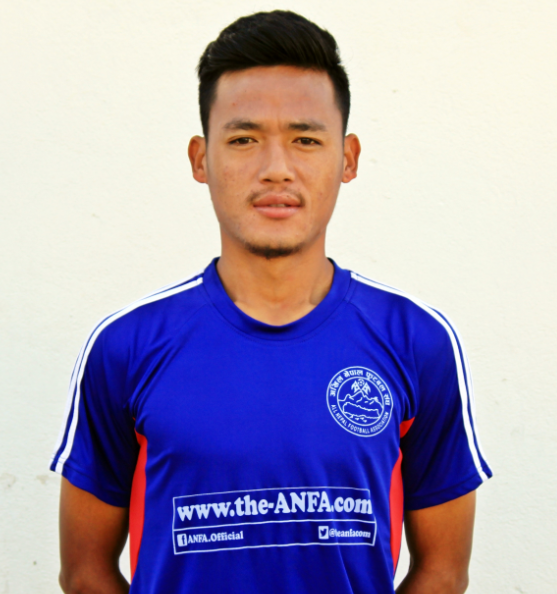

Personal information
- Full name: Bikram Lama
- Date of birth: February 23, 1989 (age 37)
- Height: 1.80 m (5 ft 11 in)
- Position: Midfielder

Team information
- Current team: Three Star Club
- Number: 12

Senior career*
Years	Team	Apps	(Gls)
2011–2023	Three Star Club	300	(15)

International career
2014	Nepal u-23	3	(0)
2012–2023	Nepal	37	(0)
- * Club domestic league appearances and goals

Bikram Lama (Nepali: बिक्रम लामा; born 23 February 1989) is a former Nepalese football player. He was the captain of Three Star Club, a four time Martyr's Memorial A-Division League champion. He took retirement from professional football on June 10, 2023. Lama currently serves as President at Nepal Football Player Association (NFPA).

== Style of play ==
Bikram is known for his passing abilities and exquisite sliding tackles, which is why people often call him as 'Tackle Lama' in Nepal. His lanky figure gives him advantage in the air and has been able to make most of it too. Nepal's famous victory over India in 2013 SAFF Championship was inspired by his header, which was tapped in by Anil Gurung after rebound off the crossbar. He has won numerous accolades with his club recent being the first ever National League title for Three Star Club in 2015. Lama played every minute of the 15 league matches he started and missed just one due to yellow card suspension.

== Playing career ==
In the aftermath of the April 2015 earthquake and subsequent May aftershock Lama spent time delivery relief supplies and raising awareness in Sindhupalchowk

Bikram was an integral part of the team that won Bangabandhu Gold Cup 2016 and Gold Medal in the 12th South Asian Games. After his contributions for national sides, he had attracted Indonesian Club Persepam Madura Utama and the club has contracted him.
