= Amar Dongol =

Nepalese footballer

Personal information
- Full name: Amar Dongol
- Place of birth: Nepal
- Position: Striker

Team information
- Current team: Ranipokhari Corner Team

International career
Years	Team	Apps	(Gls)
- Nepal

Amar Dongol (Nepali: अमर डंगोल) is a Nepali striker who currently plays for Ranipokhari Corner Team and the Nepal national team.

== International Football ==
His debut was against Pakistan in a friendly. His first major tournament was 2014 AFC Challenge Cup qualification in game against Northern Mariana Islands, in which he entered the match in the 72nd minute. He wears 33 number jersey for the national team.

=== International goals ===
#	Date	Venue	Opponent	Score	Result	Competition
