= Ganesh Lawati =

Nepalese footballer

Personal information
- Full name: Ganesh Lawati
- Date of birth: June 1, 1981 (age 45)
- Position: Forward

Team information
- Current team: APF Club

Senior career*
Years	Team	Apps	(Gls)
- APF Club

International career
2011–	Nepal	4	(0)
- * Club domestic league appearances and goals

Ganesh Lawati (Nepali: गणेश लावती) (born 1 June 1981) is a footballer from Nepal. He made his first appearance for the Nepal national football team in 2011. He plays for the departmental team APF Club.
