= Lumbini F.C. =

Lumbini
- Full name: Lumbimi Football Club
Home colours

Lumbini Football Club was a Nepali professional association football club based in Butwal, Rupandehi. It last competed in the Nepal National League in 2015.
