= Tribhuvan Challenge Shield =

- Founded: 1948
- Region: Kathmandu, Nepal
- Most championships: (Nepal) Mahendra Police Club (8 titles)

The Tribhuvan Challenge Shield was Nepal's second oldest football tournament, founded in 1948 by King Tribhuvan.

== History ==
In the first edition, King's XI led by Nar Shumsher secured first position and N. R. T. team finished second. In the year 1951 (2008 BS), Jaleshwor XI bagged the shield.

=== Dasarath Rangasala tragedy ===
On 12 March 1988, at least 93 people were killed and 100 more injured in a stadium crush at Dasarath Rangasala Stadium in Kathmandu. The Tribhuvan Challenge Shield Cup match drew 30,000 fans. However, a storm broke over the city, bringing lightning, wind and hailstones. Spectators rushed to the sheltered west stand, but police pushed them back. They turned towards the exits, and most of the deaths occurred as multiple gates were closed.

== Table ==
Year	Winner	Runner-up
1948	(Nepal) King's XI	Unknown
1949	Not held	
1950	Not held	
1951	Not held	
1952	(Nepal) Jaleshwor XI	Unknown
1953	(Nepal) Nepalese Police	Unknown
1954	(Nepal) Defence XI	Unknown
1955	(India) Indian Army	Unknown
1956	(India) Indian Army	Unknown
1957	(Nepal) Armed Police Force	Unknown
1958	Nepal Army Club	Unknown
1959	Nepal Police Club	Unknown
1960	Nepal Army Club	Unknown
1961	(Nepal) Education Exercise Association	Unknown
1962	(Nepal) Education Exercise Association	Unknown
1963	(Nepal) Education Exercise Association	Unknown
1964	Not held	
1965	Not held	
1966	(Nepal) Koshi XI	Unknown
1967	(India) Birpur	Unknown
1968	(Nepal) Thamel CI	Unknown
1969	(India) Brothers Club	Unknown
1970	(Nepal) Mahabir XI	Unknown
1971	Not held	
1972	Not held	
1973	Not held	
1974	Not held	
1975	Not held	
1976	(Nepal) Boys Union Club (Nepal) Mahendra Police Club	Unknown
1977	(Nepal) Boys Union Club	Unknown
1978	(Nepal) Mahendra Police Club	Unknown
1979	(Nepal) Sankata Boys Sports Club	Unknown
1980	(Nepal) Mahendra Police Club	Unknown
1981	(Nepal) Mahendra Police Club	Unknown
1982	(India) Bangalore XI	Unknown
1983	(Nepal) Mahendra Police Club	Unknown
1984	(India) Punjab Electricity Board	Unknown
1985	(Nepal) Friends Club	(Nepal) New Road Youth
1986	(Nepal) Friends Club	(Bhutan) Thimpu XI*

*Thimpu refused to participate in penalty shoot-out

== See also ==
- Football in Nepal
- Pokhara Cup
- Aaha! Gold Cup
- Simara Gold Cup
- Budha Subba Gold Cup
- KP Oli Cup
- Jhapa Gold Cup
- ANFA Cup
