= Jhapa XI =

- Full name: Jhapa XI Football Club
- Nickname: Purbeli Lions
- Founded: 2014; 12 years ago
- Ground: Domalal Rajbanshi Stadium, Birtamode
- President: Jal Kumar Gurung
- Head coach: Ankur Tamang
| Home colours | Away colours |

Jhapa Football Club, also known as Jhapa XI, is a professional football club which represented Jhapa district in the Nepal National Football League. Jhapa XI participated in the Nepal National League for the first time in 2015, finishing 4th. The club has also participated in the Martyr's Memorial B-Division League.

== Honours ==
=== Domestic ===
- ANFA Cup
  - Champions (1): 2014
- Birat Gold Cup
  - Champions (1): 2015
- Jhapa Gold Cup
  - Runners-up (4): 2016, 2017, 2018, 2019
- Birat Gold Cup
  - Quarter-finals (1): 2015

=== Invitational ===
- Sikkim Governor's Gold Cup
  - Runners-up (1): 2016
