= Yogesh Gurung =

Nepali footballer (born 2002)

Personal information
- Full name: Yogesh Gurung
- Date of birth: 17 March 2002 (age 24)
- Place of birth: Lekhnath, Nepal
- Height: 1.82 m (5 ft 11 1/2 in)
- Positions: Defensive midfielder; center-back

Team information
- Current team: City Club
- Number: 3

Senior career*
Years	Team	Apps	(Gls)
2021–2023	Three Star Club	5	(1)
2021	→ Dhangadhi (loan)	2	(0)
2022	Church Boys United	12	(2)
2023–2024	Jhapa FC	5	(0)
2025	Church Boys United	0	(0)
2025	→ Lalitpur City (loan)	8	(0)
2025–2026	Brothers Union	4	(0)
2026–	City Club	4	(0)

International career^{‡}
2023–	Nepal	3	(0)
- * Club domestic league appearances and goals as of 16 October 2026 ‡ National team caps and goals as of 20 January 2026

Yogesh Gurung (Nepali: योगेश गुरुङ; born 17 March 2002) is a Nepalese professional footballer who plays as a defensive midfielder for Bangladesh Football League club City Club and the Nepal national team.

== Club career ==
=== Dhangadhi FC ===
Yogesh represented Dhangadhi FC in the 2021 Nepal Super League, making only 2 appearances.

=== Church Boys United ===
In 2022, Yogesh played for Church Boys United in the 2022 Martyr's Memorial B-Division League, making 12 appearances and scoring 2 goals as his club earned promotion as league champions.

=== Three Star Club ===
In the 2023 Martyr's Memorial A-Division League, Yogesh represented Three Star Club, appearing in 4 matches and scoring 1 goal.

=== Brothers Union ===
In 2025, Yogesh was one of the four Nepali internationals to join Bangladesh Football League club Brothers Union.

== International career ==
On 16 November 2023, Yogesh made his debut for Nepal against UAE in the 2026 FIFA World Cup qualification – AFC second round.

== Career statistics ==
=== International ===
As of 10 June 2025.

Nepal national team
Year	Apps	Goals
2023	2	0
2025	1	0
Total	3	0

== Honours ==
Church Boys United

- B-Division League: 2022
