= Morang XI =

- Full name: Rijalco Morang XI
- Founded: 2013; 13 years ago
- Ground: Sahid Rangsala
- Capacity: 15,000
- League: National Football League

Morang XI is a Nepali football club which last played the National Football League. The club was formed in Biratnagar. They reached the semi-finals of the Birat Gold Cup in February 2016.

== Ground ==
The club's home ground was Sahid Rangsala.

== Honours ==
Birat Gold Cup 2015

- Semi-finals

Udayapur Gold Cup 2016

- Runners-up

Falgunanda Gold Cup 2017

- Runners-up
