= New Road Team =

Nepalese football club

- Full name: New Road Team Football Club
- Nickname: NRT
- Founded: 1934; 92 years ago
- Ground: Dasarath Rangasala Stadium, Kathmandu
- Capacity: 15,000
- Chairman: Narendraman Shrestha
- Manager: Raju Kaji Shakya
- League: Martyr's Memorial A-Division League; Nepal National League (sometimes)
- 2023: Martyr's Memorial A-Division League, 6th of 14
- Website: www.nrt.org.np
Home colours	Away colours

New Road Team Football Club (NRT FC) (Nepali: न्यु रोड टिम; better known by its abbreviation NRT FC or simply NRT) is the Football Club own by a Nepalese multi-sports club Kathmandu Khel Mandal, widely known for its football achievements. The club is based in Tripureshwor, Kathmandu. They compete in the Martyr's Memorial A-Division League.

== History ==
New Road Team, with European players.

NRT was established in 1991 BS (1934 AD). Besides sports, the club was also active in mobilizing youth against the autocratic Rana regime. NRT is one of the oldest existing club in Nepal. The club took part in the Asian Club Championship in 1996, in which they were eliminated from the first round suffering 2(2)–2(4) defeat to the Indian club JCT.

For the season of 2013–14, the club decided not to participate in league and other domestic competitions. NRT were automatically demoted 'B' Division for not registering their team at ANFA for league season.

In June 2022, in a statement issued by New Road Team's general secretary Narendraman Shrestha, the club had participate in the inaugural edition of Tuan Yang Terut Cup (TYT Cup) in Penang, Malaysia, organized by Melaka United, in the pre-season targeting the upcoming A-Division league. The club then roped in few new faces including SAARC quota player Nicholas Fernandes from India and set on the pre-season tour to Malaysia and Thailand.

The club began their journey with a defeat to Indonesian Liga 2 side Karo United by 5–1. They again suffered a heavy defeat, by 5–0, in their second match against Malaysia Super League side Penang.

== Players (2023) ==
As of 28 February 2023

Note: Flags indicate national team as defined under FIFA eligibility rules; some limited exceptions apply. Players may hold more than one non-FIFA nationality.

No.	Pos.	Nation	Player
2	DF	NEP	Sanam Sodemba Limbu
3	DF	NEP	Bikram Dhimal
4	DF	CMR	Jean-Anicet Mboumi
5	DF	NEP	Rajan Chaudhary
6	DF	NEP	Ajay Chaudhary
7	MF	NEP	Kritish Ratna Chunju
8	MF	NEP	Asish Rai
9	FW	NEP	Sanjeeb Bista
10	MF	IND	Saivish Singh
11	FW	NEP	Dipesh Ale Magar
12	DF	NEP	Saroj Tamang
13	MF	NEP	Janmejay Dhami
14	MF	CMR	Stéphane Junior Nguimbous
15	MF	NEP	Ashok Thapa

No.	Pos.	Nation	Player
16	DF	NEP	Mohit Gurung
17	FW	CMR	Nicolas-Serge Song
18	FW	NEP	Rohan Khadgi
19	MF	NEP	Kshitiz Bhandari
20	FW	NEP	Susan Shrestha
21	FW	NEP	Jenish Prajapati
23	FW	IND	Lalnunzama
24	DF	NEP	Gaurab Shrestha
26	DF	NEP	Bibek Gurung
27	FW	NEP	Maikal Garbuja
28	FW	NEP	Ronish Dheke Rajbhak
31	GK	NEP	Pujan Hona
33	GK	NEP	Santosh Mahat

=== Current Technical Squad ===
As of 28 February 2023

Position	Name
Head coach	Raju Kaji Shakya
Assistant Coach	Jeevan Sinkeman
Goalkeeper Coach	Binod Maharjan
Physiotherapist	Loknath Kunwar
Team Manager	Surendra Shrestha

== Performance in AFC competitions ==
- Asian Club Championship: 2 appearances

1986: Qualifying Stage
1997: First Round

- AFC President's Cup: 1 appearance

2010: Group Stage

== League finishes ==
Champions	Runners-up	Third place	Promoted	Relegated

Season	League	Position	AFC President's Cup
2005–06	A-Division	6th	—
2006–07	A-Division	8th	—
2010	A-Division	3rd	Group stage (Note: As there was no league held in 2009, the top team after the first half of the 2010 season was named as the Nepalese representative by the All Nepal Football Association for the 2010 AFC President's Cup.)
2011	A-Division	7th	—
2011–12	National League	8th	—
2012–13	A-Division	5th	—
2013–14	A-Division	Withdrew	—
2016	B-Division	2nd	Competition disbanded
2018–19	A-Division	14th	Competition disbanded
2019–20	A-Division	8th	Competition disbanded
2021–22	A-Division	3rd	Competition disbanded
2023	A-Division	6th	Competition disbanded

== Honours ==
=== Domestic ===
- Martyr's Memorial A-Division League
  - Champions: 1960–61, 1962–63, 1974–75, 1978–79, 1995–96
- Simara Gold Cup
  - Champions: 2078 B.S.
- Nepal National League Cup
  - Champions: 1985
- Mahendra Gold Cup
  - Champions: 1998

=== Invitational ===
- Sikkim Governor's Gold Cup
  - Champions: 2007

== Under-18 ==
=== Performance record ===
Performance of New Road Team U-18 in ANFA Youth Leagues
Year	Tournament	Final Position
2024	U-18 ANFA Youth League	Runners-up
