= Manang Marshyangdi Club =

- Full name: Manang Marshyangdi Club
- Nickname: The Mountains
- Founded: 1982; 44 years ago
- Ground: Dasharath Stadium
- Capacity: 15,000
- President: Mukhya Gurung
- Head coach: Bishnu Gurung
- League: Martyr's Memorial A-Division League; Nepal National League (sometimes)
- 2023: Martyrs Memorial A-Division, 8th of 14
- Website: https://www.facebook.com/share/1BbSK76xbQ/
Home colours	Away colours

Manang Marshyangdi Club (Nepali: मनाङ मर्स्याङ्दी क्लब) is a Nepali professional football club based in Kathmandu, that competes in the Martyr's Memorial A-Division League. The club has won the National Championship title a record 8 times. Historically, they have had a fierce rivalry in domestic Nepalese football with Three Star Club and Nepal Police Club, a departmental team. Their other rivals include New Road Team.

Manang Marshyangdi Club has played some home games in Pokhara, at Pokhara Rangasala since 2021–22 Martyr's Memorial A-Division League. However, the club is officially based in Swayambhu, Kathmandu.

== Club history ==
=== Season 2068 B.S. (2011–12) ===
Manang Marshyandi started the season featuring the names like Anil Gurung and Santosh Sahukhala. They also roped in Korean coach Lee Tae-Ho, making the long-serving Bal Gopal Maharjan his assistant. The side finished second, level on points with the champions Nepal Police Club, missing out due to goal difference. Their consolation was beating the Police in the final round. They were promoted to play the first ever Nepal National League.

=== Season 2069 B.S. (2012–13) ===
The club was reorganised and Krishna Thapa was appointed as the new coach. The season started well as they won both the Ncell Cup and the Safal Cup. They also won the Martyr's Memorial League.

=== Season 2070 B.S. (2013–14) ===
The 2013–14 season, they won the title for the record 7th time. In October 2014, they participated in the Sikkim Governor's Gold Cup and reached the final, losing to ONGC FC in the title winning match through penalty shoot-out.

== Supporters ==
Manang Marshyangdi has a dedicated fanbase. The club’s official supporters’ group is known as Manang Marsyangdi Club Forever.

== 2023 squad ==
Note: Flags indicate national team as defined under FIFA eligibility rules; some limited exceptions apply. Players may hold more than one non-FIFA nationality.

No.	Pos.	Nation	Player
1	GK	NEP	Jiyarat Shekh
3	DF	NEP	Saroj Yonjan Lama
4	DF	NEP	Ashish Gurung
5	MF	CMR	Diawandou Niang Diagne
6	DF	NEP	Randip Paudel
7	MF	NEP	Roshan Rana Magar
8	MF	UZB	Sayidjamol Davlajonev
9	FW	TOG	Koffi Timothee Koudo
10	MF	NEP	Bhishon Gurung
12	DF	NEP	Pravesh Kunwar
14	DF	NEP	Ramesh Thapa

No.	Pos.	Nation	Player
15	DF	NEP	Chetan Tharu
19	MF	NEP	Bijaya Shrestha
21	MF	NEP	Prashanna Shrestha
22	GK	NEP	Deep Karki (captain)
23	MF	NEP	Kamal Thapa
24	DF	NEP	Jeevan Gurung
25	GK	NEP	Khom Bahadur Shrestha
26	DF	NGA	Saheed Oluwshina Azeez
66	MF	NEP	Sumit Shrestha
77	FW	IND	Yash Tukaram Mahatare

== Club officials (2023) ==
- President: Mukhya Gurung
- General secretary: Tenzing Gurung
- Treasurer: Karma Gurung

== Kit manufacturers and shirt sponsors ==
Period	Kit manufacturer	Shirt sponsor
2019–2021	Kelme	
2021–	KTM CTY	

== Honours ==
=== Domestic ===
- Martyr's Memorial A-Division League
  - Champions (8): 1986, 1987, 1989, 2000, 2003, 2005–06, 2013-14, 2018–19

=== Invitational ===
- Sikkim Gold Cup
  - Champions (1): 2018
- King's Cup (Bhutan)
  - Champions (1): 2018
- Jigme Dorji Wangchuk Memorial Gold Cup
  - Champions (1): 2013

=== Others ===
- Buddha Subba Gold Cup: (3)

2004, 2016, 2020

- Khukuri Gold Cup: (1)

2003

- San Miguel Itahari Gold Cup: (1)

2007

- Aaha! Gold Cup: (6)

2004, 2005, 2012, 2016, 2017, 2020

- Aadarsha Cup: (1)

2011

- Simara Gold Cup: (1)

2012

- Ncell Cup: (1)

2012

- Pokhara Cup: (1)

2012
2013

- Jhapa Gold Cup: (1)

2017

== Performance in AFC competitions ==
- Asian Club Championship: 1 appearance

1988: Qualifying stage

- AFC President's Cup: 2 appearances

2006: Group stage
2014: Final stage

- AFC Cup: 1 appearance

2019: Group stage

=== Continental record ===
Season	Continental tournament	Round	Club	Home	Away	Aggregate
1988	Asian Club Championship	Qualifying round	(Bangladesh) Mohammedan SC	2–6		4th
1988	Asian Club Championship	Qualifying round	(India) Mohun Bagan AC	1–6		4th
1988	Asian Club Championship	Qualifying round	(Iraq) Al-Rasheed	1–6		4th
1988	Asian Club Championship	Qualifying round	(Pakistan) PAF FC	4–1		4th
2006	AFC President's Cup	Group Stage	(Sri Lanka) Ratnam Sports Club	0–2		3rd
2006	AFC President's Cup	Group Stage	(Tajikistan) Vakhsh	3–1		3rd
2006	AFC President's Cup	Group Stage	(Kyrgyzstan) Dordoi-Dynamo	0–2		3rd
2014	AFC President's Cup	Group Stage	(Cambodia) Svay Rieng	6–3		1st
2014	AFC President's Cup	Group Stage	(Mongolia) Erchim	0–0		1st
2014	AFC President's Cup	Final Stage	Sri Lanka Air Force	2–1		2nd
2014	AFC President's Cup	Final Stage	(Turkmenistan) HTTU Aşgabat	1–3		2nd
2019	AFC Cup	Group E	(Bangladesh) Abahani Limited Dhaka	0–1	0–5	4th
2019	AFC Cup	Group E	(India) Chennaiyin	2–3	0–2	4th
2019	AFC Cup	Group E	(India) Minerva Punjab	1–1	2–2	4th

== League finishes ==
The season-by-season performance of MMC since 2000:

Champions	Runners-up	Third place	Promoted	Relegated

Season	League	Position
2000	Martyr's Memorial A-Division League	1st
2001–2002	League not held	
2003	Martyr's Memorial A-Division League	1st
2004	Martyr's Memorial A-Division League	4th
2005-06	Martyr's Memorial A-Division League	1st
2006-07	Martyr's Memorial A-Division League	4th
2008–2009	League not held	
2010	Martyr's Memorial A-Division League	5th
2011	Martyr's Memorial A-Division League	2nd
2011-12	Nepal National League	3rd
2012-13	Martyr's Memorial A-Division League	2nd
2013-14	Martyr's Memorial A-Division League	1st
2015	Nepal National League	3rd
2016-18	League not held	
2018-19	Martyr's Memorial A-Division League	1st
2019–20	Martyr's Memorial A-Division League	3rd
2021–22	Martyr's Memorial A-Division League	5th
2023	Martyr's Memorial A-Division League	8th

== Under-18 ==
=== Performance record ===
Performance of Manang Marshyangdi Club U-18 in ANFA Youth Leagues
Year	Tournament	Final Position
2024	U-18 ANFA Youth League	9th
