= Nepal A.P.F. Club =

Armed police sports club in Kathmandu

- Full name: Nepal Armed Police Force Club
- Nicknames: APF
- Founded: 24 October 2001; 24 years ago
- League: PM Cup; Martyr's Memorial A-Division; ANFA Women's League
- Based in: Kathmandu
- Stadium: Halchowk Stadium
- Owner: Armed Police Force
- President: SSP Bikash Ghimire
- Website: www.apf.gov.np

Nepal A.P.F. Club (Nepali: नेपाल ऐपिएफ क्लब), commonly known as APF Club, is a professional multi-sports club based in Kathmandu, Bagmati Province, Nepal. The club is the sports wing of the Armed Police Force.

== History ==
APF Club was established on 24 October 2001, following the tradition of forming a sports club within an official group, as the police and army clubs had already done. Initially, the club was named Gyanendra APF Club, in tribute to the king at the time. When the government decided to remove all references to royalty, it changed their name to APF Club.

== See also ==
- Armed Police Force
- Nepal Army Club
- Nepal Police Club
- APF FC
- APF WFC
- APF cricket team
