= Nepal Army Club =

Army sporting club of nepal

- Sport: Cricket; Football
- Founded: 1951; 75 years ago
- League: PM Cup; Martyr's Memorial A-Division; ANFA Women's League
- Based in: Kathmandu
- Owner: Nepalese Army
- President: COAS Prabhu Ram Sharma
- Website: www.nepalarmy.mil.np

Nepal Army Club, also known as Tribhuwan Army Club, is the departmental army sporting club of Nepal, based in Kathmandu. In cricket, they played in the top domestic National League Cricket and later in the Prime Minister One Day Cup, whereas in football they play in the Martyr's Memorial A-Division League and the National Women's League.

== Army teams ==
=== Cricket ===
- Tribhuwan Army Club cricket team

=== Football ===
- Nepal Army F.C.
- Nepal Army F.C. (women)

== See also ==
- Nepalese Army
- Nepal Police Club
- APF Club
