= Three Star Club =

- Nicknames: The Patanites; The Stars
- Founded: 1974; 52 years ago
- Ground: Chyasal Stadium
- Capacity: 10,000
- Chairman: Arun Man Joshi
- Manager: Meghraj K. C.
- League: Qatar Airways Martyr's Memorial A-Division League
- 2023: A-Division League, 13th of 14 (relegated)
Home colours	Away colours

Three Star Club is a Nepali professional football club based in Lalitpur. The club was formed in 2031 BS (1974). Dinker Govinda Amatya, Lt. Krishna Charan Mishra, Lt. Kedar Lal Khosin, Rajkaji Lakhey, Motikaji Bajracharya and Lt. Mehbooh Khan are the founding members. The club has been recognizable as one of the leading football teams in the country.

== History ==
Three Star Club's football journey started in the D-Division League. The club managed to reach the Martyr's Memorial A-Division League in 2039 BS. Since then, Three Star Club has produced a steady stream of qualitative performance in national and international tournaments. Three Star Club has won Martyr's Memorial A-Division League thrice and the National League once. It is the first Nepali club to participate in the AFC President's Cup in 2005.

=== 2016–17 controversy ===
Being the champions of 2015 Nepal National League, Three Star Club was eligible to play in the 2017 AFC Cup qualifying round taking place in Ulaanbaatar. The club topped its group for which they were qualified to play in the 2017 AFC Cup. However, the All Nepal Football Association (ANFA) failed to register Three Star Club by the competition deadline, so they were not able to continue competing. In December 2016, the club therefore demanded a compensation payment of NPR 60 million. On 10 October 2017, the ANFA and Three Star Club agreed on a settlement payment of NPR 15 million in three installments. The club would then return to competitive football, in which it had not participated since the scandal began. ANFA also pledged to arrange three international competitions in which Three Star Club would be able to participate.

Season	Competition	Round	Club	Home	Away	Position
2017	AFC Cup	Qualifying Round	(Mongolia) Erchim	2–0		1st
2017	AFC Cup	Qualifying Round	(Cambodia) Nagaworld	1–1		1st

== Squad (2022) ==
Note: Flags indicate national team as defined under FIFA eligibility rules; some limited exceptions apply. Players may hold more than one non-FIFA nationality.

No.	Pos.	Nation	Player
3	DF	NEP	Ashok Khawas
5	DF	NEP	Yogesh Gurung
6	DF	NEP	Nishan Khadka
7	MF	NEP	Hemant Thapa Magar
8	FW	NEP	Susaan Shrestha
9	FW	NEP	Bijaya Bhujel
10	MF	NEP	Dona Thapa
11	FW	NEP	Sanjok Rai
12	MF	NEP	Bikram Lama (captain)
14	MF	NEP	Mikchhen Tamang

No.	Pos.	Nation	Player
16	GK	NEP	Roshan Gurung
17	MF	NEP	Ritik Khadka
18	DF	NEP	Ashwin Bhattarai
19	MF	NEP	Aayush Ghalan
20	DF	NEP	Bijay Shrestha
22	GK	NEP	Arun Blon
23	DF	NEP	Min Bahadur Dhimal
24	DF	NEP	Jeevan Gurung
27	DF	NEP	Nirajan Maharjan
25	MF	IND	Lalrammawia Rammawia
25	FW	NEP	Sushan Shrestha
29	FW	LBR	Ansumana Kromah
30	MF	NEP	Managya Nakarmi

== Honours ==
=== National ===
- Martyr's Memorial A-Division League
  - Champions (4): 1997, 1998, 2004, 2012–13
- Nepal National League
  - Champions (1): 2015
- Satashi Gold Cup
  - Winners (1): 2020

=== Invitational ===
- Bordoloi Trophy
  - Champions (1): 2016
  - Runners-up (1): 2010
- Kalinga Cup
  - Runners-up (1): 2010
- Sikkim Gold Cup
  - Champions(2): 2008, 2013
  - Runners-up (1): 2007, 2012

=== Continental ===
- AFC President's Cup: Semi-Finalist (2005)

=== Regional ===
- Dipendra Gold Cup, Kathmandu: 1 (1981)
- Mani Mukunda Gold Cup, Palpa: 1 (1984)
- Mahendra Gold Cup, Birgunj: 1 (1995)
- North Bengal Gold Cup, India: 2 (1997, 2001)
- Jana Andolan-2 Smriti Gold Cup, Heatuda: 1 (2007)
- 30th All India Governor's Gold Cup, India: 1 (2008)
- Aaha Gold Cup, Pokhara: 4 (2007, 2011, 2013, 2015)
- Budha Subba Gold Cup, Dharan: 5 (2005, 2007, 2009, 2012, 2018)
- British Gurkha Cup, Kathmandu: 2 (2010, 2011)
- Tilotama Gold Cup, Butwal: 1 (2018)
- Madan Bhandari Memorial Ithari Gold Cup: 1 (2019)
- Birat Gold Cup, Biratnagar: 1 (2018)
- His Majesty's Birthday Cup, Kathmandu: Runner-up (1984, 2005)
- Santosh Trophy, Bara: Runner-up (1984)
- Earthquake Victim Gold Cup, Ilam: Runner-up (1997)
- Bijaya Memorial Gold Cup, India: Runner-up (1997)

== League finishes ==
The season-by-season performance of TSC since the first title in 1997:

Champions	Runners-up	Third place	Promoted	Relegated

Season	League	Position
1997	Martyr's Memorial A-Division League	1st
1998	Martyr's Memorial A-Division League	1st
1999	League not held	
2000	Martyr's Memorial A-Division League	3rd
2001–2002	League not held	
2003	Martyr's Memorial A-Division League	3rd
2004	Martyr's Memorial A-Division League	1st
2005–2006	Martyr's Memorial A-Division League	2nd
2006–2007	Martyr's Memorial A-Division League	3rd
2008–2009	League not held due to conflicts between ANFA and the clubs	
2010	Martyr's Memorial A-Division League	2nd
2011	Martyr's Memorial A-Division League	4th
2011-12	Nepal National League	6th
2012-13	Martyr's Memorial A-Division League	1st
2013-14	Martyr's Memorial A-Division League	2nd
2015	Nepal National League	1st
2016-18	League not held	
2018-19	Martyr's Memorial A-Division League	3rd
2019-20	Martyr's Memorial A-Division League	4th
2021-22	Martyr's Memorial A-Division League	6th
2023	Martyr's Memorial A-Division League	13th

== Under-18 ==
=== Performance record ===
Performance of Three Star Club U-18 in ANFA Youth Leagues
Year	Tournament	Final Position
2024	U-18 ANFA Youth League	4th

== Under-16 ==
=== Performance record ===
Performance of Three Star Club U-16 in ANFA Youth Leagues
Year	Tournament	Final Position
2025	U-16 ANFA Youth League	5th
