= Nepal Police Club =

Police sporting club of nepal

- Nickname: The Cops
- Sport: Cricket; Football
- Founded: 1952; 74 years ago
- Based in: Kathmandu
- Stadium: Nepal Police Academy, Maharjgunj, Kathmandu
- Owner: Nepal Police
- Website: www.nepalpolice.gov.np

Nepal Police Club (formerly known as Mahendra Police Club) is a Nepali professional multi-sports club owned and managed by the Nepal Police. Established in 1952 and named after the king Mahendra Bir Bikram Shah Dev, Mahendra Police Club has been best known for its men's football section, Nepal Police F.C., which competes in the Martyr's Memorial A-Division League, the top flight of Nepali club football.

== Police teams ==
=== Football ===
- Nepal Police F.C.
- Nepal Police F.C. (women)

=== Cricket ===
- Nepal Police cricket team

=== Volleyball ===
- Nepal Police women's volleyball team

== See also ==
- Nepal Army Club
- Nepal A.P.F. Club
