= List of football clubs in Nepal =

== Nepal Super League 2025 (7 teams) ==
Team	City	Province	Stadium	Capacity
Kathmandu Rayzrs	Kathmandu	Bagmati	Dasarath Stadium	18,500
Lalitpur City	Lalitpur	Bagmati	Chyasal Stadium	10,000
FC Chitwan	Bharatpur	Bagmati	Krishnapur Sports Stadium	N/A
Pokhara Thunders	Pokhara	Gandaki	Pokhara Rangasala	16,500
Butwal Lumbini	Butwal	Lumbini	ANFA Technical Centre	5,000
Dhangadhi	Dhangadhi	Sudurpashchim	Dhangadi Stadium	10,000
Jhapa	Jhapa	Koshi	Domalal Rajbanshi Ground	5,000

== Nepalese Football League (2024–25 season) ==
=== Martyr's Memorial A-Division League 2025-26 (14 teams) ===
Team	City	Province	Stadium
Church Boys United	Kathmandu	Bagmati	Dasarath Stadium
Himalayan Sherpa Club	Kathmandu	Bagmati	Dasarath Stadium
Machhindra F.C.	Kathmandu	Bagmati	Dasarath Stadium
New Road Team	Kathmandu	Bagmati	Dasarath Stadium
Sankata BSC	Kathmandu	Bagmati	Dasarath Stadium
Nepal Army F.C.	Kathmandu	Bagmati	Army Headquarter, Bhadrakali
Nepal Police F.C.	Kathmandu	Bagmati	Maharajgunj Police Training Center
APF FC	Kathmandu	Bagmati	Halchowk Stadium
Planning Boyz United	Kathmandu	Bagmati	
Shree Bhagwati Club	Tokha	Bagmati	Bhootkhel Football Ground
Friends Club	Lalitpur	Bagmati	Chyasal Stadium
Jawalakhel YC	Lalitpur	Bagmati	Chyasal Stadium
Satdobato Youth Club	Lalitpur	Bagmati	ANFA Complex
Manang Marshyangdi Club	Kathmandu (Note: Manang Marshyangdi Club has its origins in Pokhara, for which it hosted selsected home matches at Pokhara Rangasala. However, officially, the club is based in Swayambhu, Kathmandu.)	Gandaki	Pokhara Stadium

=== Martyr's Memorial B-Division League 2025-26 (14 teams) ===
Team	Location	Province	Stadium
Three Star Club	Lalitpur	Bagmati	Chyasal Stadium
FC Khumaltar	Lalitpur (Khumaltar)	Bagmati	Chyasal Stadium
Bansbari Club	Kathmandu (Maharajgunj)	Bagmati	Bansbari Football Ground, Bansbari
Birgunj United	Parsa (Birgunj)	Madhesh	
Boys Union Club	Kathmandu (Tripureshwar)	Bagmati	
Brigade Boys Club	Lalitpur (Manbhawan)	Bagmati	Budhi Bikash Football Ground, Lagankhel
Chyasal Youth Club	Lalitpur (Chyasal)	Bagmati	Chyasal Stadium
Jhapa Football Club	Jhapa (Damak)	Koshi	
Madhyapur Youth Association	Bhaktapur (Madhyapur Thimi)	Bagmati	Madhyapur Youth Football Ground, Thimi
Ranipokhari Corner Team	Kathmandu (New Road)	Bagmati	Budhi Bikash Football Ground, Lagankhel
Saraswati Youth Club	Kathmandu (Koteshwor)	Bagmati	Somtirtha Football Ground, Gothatar
Shree Kumari Club	Kathmandu (Balkhu)	Bagmati	
Bagmati Youth Club	Bagmati, Sarlahi	Madhesh	
RC32 Football Academy	Surkhet (Birendranagar)	Karnali	Karnali Province Stadium

=== Martyr's Memorial C-Division League 2025 (14 teams) ===
Team	Location	Province	Stadium
Nayabasti Youth Club	Gokarneshwar (Jorpati)	Bagmati	Nayabasti Football Ground
Tusal Youth Club	Kathmandu (Boudha)	Bagmati	
Khalibari Youth Club	Lalitpur (Lagankhel)	Bagmati	
Mahabir Youth Club	Kathmandu (Dillibazaar)	Bagmati	
Manohara United Youth Club	Kathmandu (Koteshwor)	Bagmati	
Pulchowk Sports Club	Lalitpur (Pulchowk)	Bagmati	
Samaj Kalyan Khelkud Kendra	Kathmandu (Nayabazaar)	Bagmati	
Sanepa Football Club	Lalitpur (Sanepa)	Bagmati	
Sports Academy Sanga	Kavrepalanchok (Banepa)	Bagmati	
Swoyambhu Club	Kathmandu (Swoyambhu)	Bagmati	

== Province League Clubs ==
=== Koshi Province Premier League 2025 (11 teams) ===
Team	Location	District	Stadium
Gaighat Football Club	Gaighat	Udayapur	
Samrat Sporting Club		Morang	
Library Football Club		Bhojpur	
BUIPA-11		Khotang	
Pragatisheel Youth Club		Taplejung	
Dharan Football Club	Dharan	Sunsari	Dharan Stadium
Deurali Youth Club		Dhankuta	
Red Horse Club		Ilam	
Lohorung Football Club	Khandbari	Sankhuwasabha	
Panchthar United Football Club		Panchthar	
Dhaijan Charali Sporting Club		Jhapa	

=== Bagmati Province Football League 2024 (11 teams) ===
Team	Location	District	Stadium
Padampokhari Youth Club		Makawanpur	
BFC		Chitwan	
Dhunibesi Youth Society		Dhading	
Battar Youth Club		Nuwakot	
Chitlang Football Club		Kathmandu	
Thimi Youth Club		Bhaktapur	
Mount Everest FC	Banepa	Kavre	Polytechnic Institute Ground
Chautara Sporting		Sindhupalchowk	
Tiger Team		Dolakha	
Blue Alpine		Sindhuli	
Lalitpur Club		Lalitpur	

=== Lumbini Province Football League 2025 (7 teams) ===
Team	Location	District	Stadium
Rising Star F.C.		Nawalparasi	
Pharsitakar Youth Club		Rupandehi	
Dhamboji Club		Banke	
Jana Jagriti Youth Club		Bardiya	
New Star Football Academy		Dang	
Golden Star Youth Club		Kapilvastu	
New Youth Union		Palpa	

=== Karnali Province Football League 2024 (2 teams) ===
Team	Location	District	Stadium
Kakrebihar Football Club		Surkhet	Karnali Province Stadium
Binayak Football Club		Jumla	

=== Sudurpashchim Province Football League ===
Team	Location	District	Stadium
Manakamana Youth Club		Kailali	dhangadhi Province Stadium
Pasupati Far West Club		Kailali	
Prithvian Gorkha Kings Football Club		Kailali	

== Other Clubs ==
- African United Club
- Birgunj United
- Boudha FC
- Boys Sports Club
- British School FC
- Everest Club Chitwan
- Far Western Football Club
- Football Club Tikapur
- Gyanbhairab Club
- Hong Kong Nepalese Football Association
- Kanchanjunga F.C.
- Kalanki Nawajyoti Club
- karnali warriors football club
- Lumbini Football Club
- Lalbandi F.C.
- Morang Football Club
- Munal Club
- Nawa Jana Jagriti Yuwa Club
- Nepal Japan Youth Club
- Sagarmatha XI
- Sahara Club (Pokhara)
- Sahara Club (UK)
- Sahara Club (Hong Kong)
- Sangam Club
- Sanogaucharan Youth Club
- Simara FC
- Sudurpashim-11 Kailali
- United Nepal Football Club
- Prithvian Gorkha Kings Football Club
