= 2021–22 Martyr's Memorial A-Division League =

Martyr's Memorial A-Division League
- Season: 2021–22
- Dates: 19 November 2021 – 26 February 2022
- Champions: Machhindra FC
- Relegated: Chyasal Youth Club; Brigade Boys Club
- AFC Cup: Machhindra F.C.
- Matches: 91
- Goals: 190 (2.09 per match)
- Top goalscorer: Jamoul Francois (7 goals) (Note: Despite Jamoul Francois and Messouke Oloumou both scoring 7 goals each, ANFA awarded the title of top goalscorer to Jamoul Francois, as he scored the goals in less time.)
- Highest scoring: 7 goals FC 5–2 BBC
- Longest winning run: 7 games Machhindra
- Longest unbeaten run: 13 games Tribhuvan Army; Machhindra
- Longest winless run: 9 games Friends Club
- Longest losing run: 3 games Nepal APF Club; Brigade Boys; Chyasal Youth Club; Jawalakhel YC; Friends Club
- Highest attendance: 11,000
- Lowest attendance: 200
- All statistics correct as of 26 February 2022.

The 2021–22 Martyr's Memorial A-Division League (Nepali: शहीद स्मारक ए डिभिजन लिग २०७८), also known as the Qatar Airways Martyr's Memorial A-Division League for sponsorship reasons, was the 44th edition of Nepal's Martyr's Memorial A-Division League since its establishment in 1954-55. A total of 14 teams competed in the league.

Machhindra F.C. were the defending champions. Due to time constraints, as the league was to finish after the qualification cut-off, the All Nepal Football Association decided that, rather than the eventual winner, the top team after matchday 7, Machhindra F.C., would represent the league in the 2022 AFC Cup preliminary round 1.

The league was scheduled to begin on 19 September 2021 but the date was pushed back to 15 November 2021 after multiple participating clubs demanded to postpone the league start due to the ongoing COVID-19 pandemic in Nepal. It was finally scheduled to be played from 19 November and matches were to be played only on weekends as opposed to being played throughout the week as had been the case during the previous seasons.

On 16 February 2022, after matchday 11, Machhindra F.C. were crowned as league winners for the second consecutive time.

== Teams ==
A total of 14 teams, all based in the Kathmandu Valley, contested the league with a relegation system. Thirteen teams from the 2019–20 season and one team promoted from the B-Division participated in the league. Satdobato Youth Club, who debuted in the A-Division league, replaced Saraswoti Youth Club who were relegated after five seasons in the league. Prior to the season, Nepal Army Club reverted their name back to Tribhuvan Army F.C., a name that the team had used until the 2010 season.

=== Location ===
Team	Location	Previous Season
Himalayan Sherpa Club	Kathmandu	10th
Machhindra F.C.	Kathmandu	1st
Nepal APF Club	Kathmandu	12th
Tribhuvan Army F.C.	Kathmandu	2nd
Nepal Police Club	Kathmandu	5th
New Road Team	Kathmandu	8th
Sankata BSC	Kathmandu	7th
Brigade Boys Club	Lalitpur	13th
Chyasal Youth Club	Lalitpur	9th
Friends Club	Lalitpur	11th
Jawalakhel YC	Lalitpur	6th
Satdobato Youth Club	Lalitpur	1st (2020 B-Division)
Three Star Club	Lalitpur	4th
Manang Marshyangdi Club	Kathmandu (Note: Manang Marshyangdi Club has its origins in Pokhara, for which it hosted selsected home matches at Pokhara Rangasala. However, officially, the club is based in Swayambhu, Kathmandu.)	3rd

=== Personnel and kits ===
Team	Head Coach	Captain	Kit Manufacturer	Shirt Sponsor
Brigade Boys Club	(Nepal) Sanoj Shrestha	(Nepal) Anil Gurung	MFashionista	Khukri Rum
Chyasal Youth Club	(Nepal) Bal Gopal Sahukhala	(Nepal) Biraj Maharjan	Ucan	
Friends Club	(Nepal) Mrigendra Mishra	(Nepal) Prakash Budhathoki	Ucan	
Himalayan Sherpa Club	(Nepal) Yugal Kishor Rai	(Nepal) Bishwas Shrestha	KTM CTY	Nepal Ice
Jawalakhel YC	(Nepal) Kishor K.C.	(Nepal) Kuldip Karki	Li-Ning	
Machhindra F.C.	(Nepal) Prabesh Katuwal	(Nepal) Sujal Shrestha	T10 Sports	Pepe Pizza, Surf Excel
Manang Marshyangdi Club	(Nepal) Rajendra Tamang	(Nepal) Anjan Bista	KTM CTY	Nepal Oil Corporation
Nepal APF Club	(Nepal) Kumar Thapa	(Nepal) Top Bahadur Bista	Kelme	Agni Mahindra
Nepal Police Club	(Nepal) Ananta Raj Thapa	(Nepal) Ram Chandra Wajee	Kelme	
New Road Team	(Nepal) Raju Kaji Shakya	(Nepal) Bikram Dhimal	Kelme	
Sankata BSC	(Nepal) Bishnu Gurung	(Nepal) Ravi Silwal	Ucan	Himalayan Bank
Satdobato Youth Club	(Nepal) Megh Raj K.C.	(Nepal) Man Bahadur Tamang	T10 Sports	Golden Oak
Tribhuvan Army F.C.	(Nepal) Nabin Neupane	(Nepal) Bharat Khawas	Kelme	Kedia Group
Three Star Club	(Nepal) Urjan Shrestha	(Nepal) Bikram Lama	Adidas	Ruslan

=== Foreign players ===
All Nepal Football Association allowed every team a maximum of four foreign players, including one from a SAARC-affiliated country. For the first time, one of the departmental teams, APF Club, signed foreign players.

Club	Player 1	Player 2	Player 3	SAARC Player	Former Player
Brigade Boys Club	(Cameroon) Bertrand Ebode	(Cameroon) Ruddy Mbakop	(Cameroon) Dady Wamba Jr	(India) Gurpreet Singh Chhabal	
Chyasal Youth Club	(Italy) Bikash Meraglia	(Cameroon) Moussa Abagana	(Cameroon) Ketcha Wannick	(India) Vijay Ponnurangam	(India) Shem Marton
Friends Club	(Trinidad and Tobago) Nathaniel García	(Trinidad and Tobago) Jomoul Francois	(Trinidad and Tobago) Ronnell Paul	(India) Rahul Yadav	
Himalayan Sherpa Club	(Cameroon) Ulrich Siewe	(Kenya) Pistone Mutamba	(Japan) Reo Nakamura	(India) Moinuddin Khan	
Jawalakhel YC	(Cameroon) Njimi Loic	(Ivory Coast) Florent Koara	(Cameroon) Onguna Nkengue Junior	(India) Nicholas Fernandes	
Machhindra Football Club	(Azerbaijan) Nurlan Novruzov	(Azerbaijan) Sadig Guliyev	(Cameroon) Andres Nia	(India) Sonam Bhutia	(Nigeria) Kareem Omolaja
Manang Marshyangdi Club	(Cameroon) Franklin Kuete	(Nigeria) Oluwaunmi Somide	(Nigeria) Afeez Olawale Oladipo	(India) Dayananda Singh Elangbam	
Nepal APF Club	(Japan) Kuriyama Yuya	(Mali) Adama Doumbiya	(Chad) Armand Beadum		
Nepal Police Club					
New Road Team	(Cameroon) Messouke Oloumou	(Cameroon) Stephane Samir	(Cameroon) Andre Thierry Biyik Biyik		
Sankata BSC	(Nigeria) Oluwasogo Glory Odeh	(Guinea) Fode Fofana	(Cameroon) Jordan Junior Owana	(India) Uttam Rai	
Satdobato Youth Club	(Nigeria) Peter Segun	(Nigeria) Ajayi Martins Kayode	(Cameroon) Martin Adelphe Silo Nanga		
Tribhuvan Army F.C.					
Three Star Club	(Cameroon) Raphael Bidias Rim	(Cameroon) Yves Priso	(Liberia) Ansumana Kromah	(India) Shem Marton	(India) Lalrammawia Rammawia

== Venues ==
The league was scheduled to be played centrally in two venues in two cities in the Kathmandu Valley. Initially, ANFA Complex was chosen to be the third venue in the Valley. Selected matches of Manang Marsyangdi Club were held in Pokhara to honour the club's origins, making it the first season with matches outside of the Kathmandu Valley. From matchday 13 onwards, ANFA Complex was reintroduced as a venue.

Nepal

Kathmandu	Lalitpur		Pokhara
Dasarath Rangasala	Chyasal Stadium (Note: Chyasal Stadium was named one of the three central venues, however, no matches were played at the stadium.)	ANFA Complex	Pokhara Rangasala
Capacity: 20,000	Capacity: 10,000	Capacity: 6,000	Capacity: 18,500

== League table ==
Pos	Team	Pld	W	D	L	GF	GA	GD	Pts	Qualification
1	Machhindra FC (C, Q)	13	11	2	0	20	2	+18	35	Qualification for 2022 AFC Cup preliminary round 1 (Note: Top team after round 7 qualified for AFC Cup)
2	Tribhuvan Army F.C.	13	5	8	0	16	8	+8	23	
3	New Road Team	13	6	5	2	16	10	+6	23	
4	Satdobato Youth Club	13	6	3	4	14	11	+3	21	
5	Manang Marshyangdi Club	13	6	3	4	19	12	+7	21	
6	Three Star Club	13	4	7	2	12	7	+5	19	
7	Sankata BSC	13	3	7	3	12	11	+1	16	
8	Nepal APF Club	13	3	6	4	16	17	−1	15	
9	Jawalakhel YC	13	3	5	5	11	14	−3	14	
10	Himalayan Sherpa Club	13	3	5	5	12	15	−3	14	
11	Nepal Police Club	13	2	6	5	10	15	−5	12	
12	Friends Club	13	2	5	6	17	22	−5	11	
13	Brigade Boys Club (R)	13	1	5	7	10	24	−14	8	Relegation to 2025 Martyr's Memorial B-Division League
14	Chyasal Youth Club (R)	13	1	3	9	5	22	−17	6	Relegation to 2025 Martyr's Memorial B-Division League

Source: HamroKhelkud
Rules for classification: 1) Points; 2) Goal difference; 3) Goals scored; 4) head-to-head.
(C) Champions; (Q) Qualified for the phase indicated; (R) Relegated

== Results ==
Home \ Away	APF	BBC	CYC	FRI	HSC	JYC	MFC	MMC	NPC	NRT	SAN	SYC	TAC	TSC
Nepal A.P.F. Club	—	2–3	0–1	3–1	1–0	0–0	1–2	3–1	1–1	3–3	0–0	1–4	1–1	0–0
Brigade Boys Club	3–2	—	0–0	2–5	1–3	0–0	0–4	0–1	1–1	0–0	0–3	2–3	0–1	1–1
Chyasal Youth Club	1–0	0–0	—	1–2	1–3	0–1	0–2	0–5	1–2	1–1	0–0	0–1	0–2	0–3
Friends Club	1–3	5–2	2–1	—	1–1	3–3	0–1	0–2	0–0	2–3	1–2	0–0	1–3	1–1
Himalayan Sherpa Club	0–1	3–1	3–1	1–1	—	1–2	0–3	0–1	1–1	0–0	1–1	1–0	1–1	0–2
Jawalakhel Youth Club	0–0	0–0	1–0	3–3	2–1	—	0–2	0–1	0–1	0–2	1–1	2–0	1–1	1–2
Machhindra F.C.	2–1	4–0	2–0	1–0	3–0	2–0	—	1–0	1–0	2–1	0–0	1–0	0–0	1–0
Manang Marshyangdi Club	1–3	1–0	5–0	2–0	1–0	1–0	0–1	—	3–1	0–1	2–2	1–2	1–1	1–1
Nepal Police Club	1–1	1–1	2–1	0–0	1–1	1–0	0–1	1–3	—	1–3	0–1	0–1	1–1	1–1
New Road Team	3–3	0–0	1–1	3–2	0–0	2–0	1–2	1–0	3–1	—	1–0	1–0	0–1	0–0
Sankata BSC	0–0	3–0	0–0	2–1	1–1	1–1	0–0	2–2	1–0	0–1	—	1–1		0–1
Satdobato Youth Club	4–1	3–2	1–0	0–0	0–1	0–2	0–1	2–1	1–0	0–1	1–1	—	1–1	1–0
Tribhuvan Army F.C.	1–1	1–0	2–0	3–1	1–1	1–1	0–0	1–1	1–1	1–0	3–1	1–1	—	0–0
Three Star Club	0–0	1–1	3–0	1–1	2–0	2–1	0–1	1–1	1–1	0–0	1–0	0–1	0–0	—

Source: ANFA
Legend: Blue = home team win; Yellow = draw; Red = away team win.

=== Positions by round ===
Team ╲ Round	1	2	3	4	5	6	7	8	9	10	11	12	13
Machhindra F.C.	3	4	2	1	2	1	1	1	1	1	1	1	1
Nepal Army F.C.	6	9	6	3	3	4	4	4	3	3	3	2	2
New Road Team	12	12	11	9	7	8	8	7	6	7	5	3	3
Satdobato Youth Club	10	6	1	5	5	5	7	8	7	6	7	5	4
Manang Marshyangdi Club	4	1	3	2	1	2	2	2	2	2	2	4	5
Three Star Club	1	7	7	6	6	7	6	5	4	4	4	6	6
Sankata BSC	8	3	4	4	4	3	3	3	5	5	6	7	7
Nepal APF Club	11	13	14	14	11	11	10	10	9	9	8	8	8
Jawalakhel YC	13	14	13	13	12	9	9	9	11	11	11	9	9
Himalayan Sherpa Club	5	11	12	12	8	6	5	6	8	8	9	10	10
Nepal Police Club	7	5	5	8	10	10	11	11	10	10	10	11	11
Friends Club	9	10	10	11	14	14	14	14	14	12	12	12	12
Brigade Boys Club	2	2	8	7	9	12	12	12	12	13	13	13	13
Chyasal Youth Club	14	8	9	10	13	13	13	13	13	14	14	14	14

Leader
Relegation to B-Division

Source: ANFA

== Season statistics ==
=== Scoring ===
==== Top goalscorers ====
As of 26 February 2022

Rank	Player	Team	Goals
1	(Trinidad and Tobago) Jomoul Francois (Note: Despite Jamoul Francois and Messouke Oloumou both scoring 7 goals each, ANFA awarded the title of top goalscorer to Jamoul Francois, as he scored the goals in less time.)	Friends Club	7
1	(Cameroon) Messouke Oloumou	New Road Team	7
2	(Nepal) Sunil Bal	Machhindra	6
2	(Nigeria) Ajayi Martins Kayode	Satdobato Youth Club	6
2	(Nigeria) Olawale Afeez Oladipo	Manang Marshyangdi Club	6
3	(Nepal) Aashish Lama	Nepal APF Club	5
3	(Nepal) Anjan Bista	Manang Marshyangdi Club	5
3	(India) Uttam Rai	Sankata BSC	5
4	(Nepal) Bikki Tamang	Nepal APF Club	4
4	(Nepal) Bimal Gharti Magar	Machhindra FC	4
4	(Nepal) Darshan Gurung	New Road Team	4
4	(Nepal) George Prince Karki	Tribhuvan Army	4
4	(Trinidad and Tobago) Nathaniel García	Friends Club	4
4	(Kenya) Pistone Mutamba	Himalayan Sherpa Club	4
4	(Nepal) Suman Lama	Nepal Police Club	4

==== Hat-tricks ====
Player	For	Against	Result	Date
(Nigeria) Ajayi Martins Kayode	Satdobato Youth Club	Nepal APF Club	4–1	3 December 2021
(Nigeria) Afeez Olawale Oladipo	Manang Marshyangdi Club	Chyasal Youth Club	5–0	8 January 2022
(Cameroon) Messouke Oloumou	New Road Team	Nepal Police Club	3–1	26 February 2022

=== Clean sheets ===
Rank	Player	Team	Clean sheets
1	(Nepal) Bishal Shrestha	Machhindra	11
2	(Cameroon) Yves Priso	Three Star Club	6
3	(Nepal) Ajit Prajapati	New Road Team	5
3	(Nepal) Bikesh Kuthu	Tribhuvan Army	5
3	(Nepal) Raja Babu Thapa	Sankata BSC	5
4	(Nepal) Abhishek Baral	Satdobato Youth Club	4
4	(Nepal) Tikendra Singh Thapa	Jawalakhel Youth Club	4
5	(Nepal) Bishal Sunar	Manang Marshyangdi Club	3
5	(Japan) Kuriyama Yuya	Nepal APF Club	3

== Awards ==
=== End-of-season awards ===
Award	Winner	Club
Player of the Season	(Nepal) Sunil Bal	Machhindra F.C.
Emerging Player	(Nepal) Dinesh Henjan	Tribhuvan Army
Top Scorer	(Trinidad and Tobago) Jomoul Francois	Friends Club
Best Goalkeeper	(Nepal) Bishal Shrestha	Machhindra F.C.
Fair Play	Satdobato Youth Club	

== Broadcast rights ==
Selected matches were broadcast live on Kantipur Television.

All matches were also streamed live on Eleven Sports.
