= Prashant Awasthi (footballer) =

Nepalese footballer

Personal information
- Date of birth: 4 November 1998 (age 27)
- Place of birth: Nepal
- Position: Midfielder

Team information
- Current team: Satdobato Youth Club
- Number: 7

Senior career*
Years	Team	Apps	(Gls)
2020	Khumaltar Youth Club	6	(1)
2021–	Satdobato Youth Club	10	(0)

International career^{‡}
2022–	Nepal	1	(0)
- * Club domestic league appearances and goals as of 10:11, 5 June 2022 (UTC) ‡ National team caps and goals as of 10:11, 5 June 2022 (UTC)

Prashant Awasthi (born 4 November 1998) is a Nepalese professional footballer who plays as a midfielder for Martyr's Memorial A-Division League club Satdobato Youth Club and the Nepal national team. He made his international national debut against Thailand on 24 March 2022 in Chonburi.

== Club career ==
In 2020, Awasthi made out of the Khumaltar Youth Club his professional debut in the 2020–21 Martyr's Memorial B-Division League (Second-tier league of Nepal).

In 2021, Awasthi was signed by newly promoted Satdobato Youth Club. He made his first-tier debut in Satdobato Youth Club against Friends Club on November 19.

== International career ==
In 2022, Awasthi was called-up in the Nepal national football team for a Thailand tour. On 24 March 2022, he made his debut official international against Thailand in the 72nd minute.

== Career statistics ==
=== Club ===
Season	Club	League	League		Continental		Total			
Season	Club	League	Apps	Goals	Apps	Goals	Apps	Goals		
2020–2021	Khumaltar Youth Club	Martyr's Memorial B-Division League	6	1	-	-	6	1		
2020–2021	Khumaltar Youth Club	Total	6	1	-	-	6	1		
2021–2022	Satdobato Youth Club	Martyr's Memorial A-Division League	10	0	-	-	10	0		
2021–2022	Satdobato Youth Club	Career total			16	1	0	0	16	1
