= 2023 Martyr's Memorial A-Division League =

Martyr's Memorial A-Division League
- Season: 2023
- Dates: 3 March – 10 June
- Champions: Church Boys United
- Relegated: APF Club; FC Khumaltar
- AFC Challenge League: Church Boys United
- AFC Cup: Machhindra F.C.
- Matches: 182
- Goals: 437 (2.4 per match)
- Top goalscorer: (Nigeria) Afeez Olawale Oladipo (23 goals)
- Biggest win: Friends Club 6–0 Himalayan Sherpa Club (17 April 2023)
- Highest scoring: 10 Goals Machhindra F.C. 7–3 FC Khumaltar (11 April 2023)
- Longest winning run: 5 matches Nepal Police F.C.
- Longest unbeaten run: 11 matches Manang Marshyangdi Club
- Longest winless run: 14 matches Three Star Club
- Longest losing run: 6 matches Manang Marshyangdi Club

The 2023 Martyr's Memorial A-Division League (Nepali: शहीद स्मारक ए डिभिजन लिग २०७९) was the 45th edition of Nepal's Martyr's Memorial A-Division League since its establishment in 1954–55. A total of 14 teams competed in the league.

Machhindra F.C. were the defending champions.

The league was scheduled to begin on 10 January 2023 but was pushed back to begin on 3 March 2023 due to a conflict between the All Nepal Football Association and the clubs regarding up-front payments.

On 6 June 2023, Church Boys United were crowned as league winners for the first time in club history, in what the Kathmandu Post called a "fairytale run," resulting in the team winning the title for three consecutive seasons after being promoted in the two years prior respectively. However, as the champions could not secure AFC club licensing, the second-placed team Machhindra F.C. qualified for the 2023–24 AFC Cup preliminary round 1.

The season would also be the first time that one of Nepal's three departmental clubs consisting of outfits of the Army, the Police and the Armed Police Force would be relegated, with the last team coming second to last and being relegated to the Martyr's Memorial B-Division League.

== Participating teams ==
The following 14 teams competed in the Martyr's Memorial A-Division League in the 2022–23 season, with 12 teams from the previous season and Church Boys United and FC Khumaltar promoted from the 2022 B-Division League.

=== Location ===
Team	Location	Previous Season
Church Boys United	Kathmandu	1st (2022 B-Division)
Himalayan Sherpa Club	Kathmandu	10th
Machhindra F.C.	Kathmandu	1st
New Road Team	Kathmandu	3rd
Sankata BSC	Kathmandu	7th
Nepal Army F.C.	Kathmandu	2nd
Nepal APF FC	Kathmandu	8th
Nepal Police F.C.	Kathmandu	11th
Friends Club	Lalitpur	12th
Jawalakhel YC	Lalitpur	9th
FC Khumaltar	Lalitpur	2nd (2022 B-Division)
Satdobato Youth Club	Lalitpur	4th
Three Star Club	Lalitpur	6th
Manang Marshyangdi Club	Kathmandu (Note: Manang Marshyangdi Club has its origins in Pokhara, for which it hosted selsected home matches at Pokhara Rangasala. However, officially, the club is based in Swayambhu, Kathmandu.)	5th

=== Personnel and kits ===
Team	Coach	Captain	Kit manufacturer	Shirt sponsor
Church Boys United	(Nepal) Bal Gopal Maharjan	(Nepal) Ananta Tamang	Anee Sports	API Power Company Limited
Friends Club	(Nepal) Urjan Shrestha	(Nepal) Prakash Budhathoki	Ucan	
Himalayan Sherpa Club	(Nepal) Suman Shrestha	(Nepal) Bishwas Shrestha	KTM CTY	
Jawalakhel YC	(Nepal) Sunil Kumar Shrestha	(Nepal) Simanta Thapa	Jersey Pasal Nepal	
FC Khumaltar	(Nepal) Yam Gurung	(Nepal) Rejin Subba	Standard Fashion	Vianet Communication
Machhindra F.C.	(Nepal) Kishor Kumar KC	(Nepal) Sujal Shrestha	Kelme	Pepe Pizza
Manang Marshyangdi Club	(Nepal) Bishnu Gurung	(Nepal) Deep Karki	KTM CTY	
APF F.C.	(Nepal) Ratna Kaji Maharjan	(Nepal) Top Bahadur Bista	Kelme	
Nepal Police F.C.	(Nepal) Chetan Ghimire	(Nepal) Ram Chandra Waji	Kelme	
New Road Team	(Nepal) Raju Kaji Shakya	(Nepal) Bikram Dhimal	Kelme	Shikhar Insurance
Sankata BSC	(Nepal) Salyan Khadgi	(Nepal) Sunil Bal	Ucan	
Satdobato Youth Club	(Nepal) Sanoj Shrestha	(Nepal) Sudip Gurung	Li-Ning	Royal Blue
Tribhuvan Army F.C.	(Nepal) Nabin Neupane	(Nepal) Bharat Khawas	Kelme	
Three Star Club	(Nepal) Meghraj K.C.	(Nepal) Bikram Lama	Euro Passion USA	

=== Foreign players ===
All Nepal Football Association has allowed a maximum of four foreign players including two from Asian country per team.

Club	Player 1	Player 2	Player 3	AFC Player	SAFF Player	Former Player
Church Boys United	(Cameroon) Franklin Kuete Talla	(Ghana) Joseph Bempah	(Cameroon) Yves Priso	(India) Ranjeet Pandre	(India) Gagandeep Singh	
Friends Club	(Ghana) Rafiq Aminu	(Ghana) Ben Quansah	(Ghana) Torric Jebrin	(Uzbekistan) Akhrorbek Uktamov	(India) Uttam Rai	
Himalayan Sherpa Club	(Ghana) Manuel Nana Agyemang	(Kenya) Pistone Mutamba	(Nigeria) Abayomi Oluwaseun Fakunle	(Lebanon) Mohamad Kdouh	(India) Satyam Sharma	
Jawalakhel YC	(Lesotho) Masoabi Nkoto	(Guinea) Fode Fofana	(Ghana) Abdul Majid Samate	(Uzbekistan) Abdulaziz Nishonboev	(India) Rahul Khokhar	
FC Khumaltar	(Cameroon) Messouke Oloumou	(Cameroon) Stephane Binong	(Ghana) Theophilus Owutey Apoh	(India) Sanwil D'Costa	(India) Abhishek Verma	
Machhindra F.C.	(Cameroon) Andrés Nia	(Nigeria) Kareem Omolaja	(Nigeria) Afeez Olawale Oladipo	(Japan) Yuta Suzuki	(Bhutan) Chencho Gyeltshen	(India) Dayananda Singh Elangbam
Manang Marshyangdi Club	(Senegal) Diawandou Diagne	(Nigeria) Oluwashina Azeez	(Togo) Koffi Timothée Koudo	(Uzbekistan) Saidzhamol Davlatzhonov	(India) Yash Mhatre	
APF F.C.	(Mali) Adama Doumbiya	(Chad) Armand Beadum	(Cameroon) Abdou Ramani Poutougnigni	(Japan) Yuya Kuriyama		
Nepal Police F.C.	(Ghana) Joe Aidoo	(Ghana) Moses Twum	(Cameroon) Serge Dicka	(Lebanon) Ahmad Hijazi	(India) Mohammed Ashiq	
New Road Team	(Cameroon) Nicolas Serge Song	(Cameroon) Jean Anicet Mboumi	(Cameroon) Stephane Junior Nguimbous	(India) Lalnunzama	(India) Saivish Singh	
Sankata BSC	(Cameroon) Andre Thiery Biyik	(Cameroon) Nelson Yunwa	(Cameroon) Junior Nkengue	(Lebanon) Youssef Atriss	(India) Sandip Alay	
Satdobato Youth Club	(Ghana) Abdul Latif Abubakari	(Ghana) William Opoku	(Serbia) Ivan Marić	(Uzbekistan) Sardorbek Matmuratov		
Tribhuvan Army Club						
Three Star Club	(Nigeria) Peter Segun	(Nigeria) Ajayi Martins Kayode	(South Africa) Siphamandla Mathenjwa	(Lebanon) Mohammad Taha		

=== Head coaching changes ===
Team	Outgoing coach	Manner of departure	Date of vacancy	Position in table	Incoming coach	Date of appointment
Manang Marshyangdi Club	(Nepal) Kiran Shrestha	Personal Issues	1 May 2023		(Nepal) Bishnu Gurung	6 May 2023
Church Boys United	(United States) Pradip Humagain	Work permit issues	6 April 2023	3rd	(Nepal) Bal Gopal Maharjan	13 April 2023
Machhindra Football Club	(Nepal) Prabesh Katuwal	Appointed National Coach Assistant	9 April 2023		(Nepal) Kishor Kumar KC	9 April 2023

== Venues ==
The league was played in two cities in the Kathmandu Valley.

Nepal

Kathmandu	Lalitpur	
Dasarath Rangasala	Chyasal Stadium	ANFA Complex
Capacity: 15,000	Capacity: 10,000	Capacity: 6,000

== Regular season ==
=== League table ===
Pos	Team	Pld	W	D	L	GF	GA	GD	Pts	Qualification
1	Church Boys United (C)	26	13	9	4	34	15	+19	48	Qualification for 2024–25 AFC Challenge League playoff round
2	Machhindra FC	26	12	9	5	41	26	+15	45	Qualification for 2023–24 AFC Cup preliminary round 1 (Note: Church Boys United failed to obtain an AFC club license and were replaced by the next highest placed team with a license.)
3	Nepal Police F.C.	26	12	5	9	29	30	−1	41	
4	Jawalakhel YC	26	11	7	8	40	32	+8	40	
5	Satdobato Youth Club	26	10	5	11	28	28	0	35	
6	New Road Team F.C.	26	8	10	8	33	37	−4	34 (Note: Head-to-head: New Road 3–3 Tribhuvan Army, New Road 1–0 Tribhuvan Army)	
7	Tribhuvan Army F.C.	26	8	10	8	30	29	+1	34	
8	Manang Marshyangdi Club	26	7	11	8	25	29	−4	32 (Note: Head-to-head points: Manang Marshyangdi 8, Three Star 5, Sankata 2)	
9	Sankata BSC	26	7	11	8	27	30	−3	32	
10	Himalayan Sherpa Club	26	7	10	9	28	35	−7	31	
11	Friends Club	26	7	9	10	42	37	+5	30 (Note: Head-to-head: Friends 1–1 Nepal APF, Friends 4–0 Nepal APF)	
12	APF F.C.	26	8	6	12	29	36	−7	30	
13	Three Star Club (R)	26	6	11	9	17	19	−2	29	Relegation to 2025-26 Martyr's Memorial B-Division League
14	FC Khumaltar (R)	26	8	3	15	34	54	−20	27	Relegation to 2025-26 Martyr's Memorial B-Division League

Source: HamroKhelkud
Rules for classification: 1) Points; 2) head-to-head; 3) Goal difference; 4) Goals scored.
(C) Champions; (R) Relegated

=== Results ===
==== 1st Round ====
Home \ Away	APF	CBU	FRI	HSC	JYC	KHU	MFC	MMC	NPC	NRT	SAN	SYC	TAC	TSC
APF F.C.	—	0–0	1–1	3–5	0–0	2–0	1–0	1–2	2–0	0–1	0–1	0–1	1–0	2–0
Church Boys United	0–0	—	1–1	1–0	0–1	3–1	0–0	3–0	2–1	2–2	0–0	2–1	0–1	0–0
Friends Club	1–1	1–1	—	6–0	2–1	0–1	1–2	0–2	1–3	3–1	3–1	0–1	1–2	3–3
Himalayan Sherpa Club	5–3	0–1	0–6	—	2–1	1–2	1–1	1–1	1–0	1–2	0–0	2–2	1–1	0–1
Jawalakhel Youth Club	0–0	1–0	1–2	1–2	—	2–2	3–1	3–0	6–1	2–1	1–1	2–1	1–3	1–0
FC Khumaltar	0–2	1–3	1–0	2–1	2–2	—	3–7	2–1	1–3	1–3	0–1	1–2	3–1	0–2
Machhindra F.C.	0–1	0–0	2–1	1–1	1–3	7–3	—	0–0	2–1	1–1	2–1	0–0	0–2	0–0
Manang Marshyangdi Club	2–1	0–3	2–0	1–1	0–3	1–2	0–0	—	0–1	3–1	1–0	0–1	0–1	1–1
Nepal Police F.C.	0–2	1–2	3–1	0–1	1–6	3–1	1–2	1–0	—	1–1	0–3	0–0	0–0	0–1
New Road Team F.C.	1–0	2–2	1–3	2–1	1–2	3–1	1–1	1–3	1–1	—	1–2	1–2	3–3	1–0
Sankata BSC	1–0	0–0	1–3	0–0	1–1	1–0	1–2	0–1	3–0	2–1	—	0–4	0–0	0–3
Satdobato Youth Club	1–0	1–2	1–0	2–2	1–2	2–1	0–0	1–0	0–0	2–1	4–0	—	3–3	0–1
Tribhuvan Army F.C.	0–1	1–0	2–1	1–1	3–1	1–3	2–0	1–0	0–0	3–3	0–0	3–3	—	0–1
Three Star Club	0–2	0–0	3–3	1–0	0–1	2–0	0–0	1–1	1–0	0–1	3–0	1–0	1–0	—

Updated to match(es) played on 30 April 2023. Source: ANFA
Legend: Blue = home team win; Yellow = draw; Red = away team win.

==== 2nd Round ====
Home \ Away	APF	CBU	FRI	HSC	JYC	KHU	MFC	MMC	NPC	NRT	SAN	SYC	TAC	TSC
APF F.C.	—	1–4	0–4	2–3	2–0	1–3	1–2	2–2	0–1	1–1	2–1	0–3	3–0	1–1
Church Boys United	4–1	—	2–1	1–1	3–0	2–0	2–1	0–0	1–0	4–1	0–1	1–0	0–1	0–0
Friends Club	4–0	1–2	—	0–0	1–4	3–1	2–2	1–1	1–2	2–2	1–1	4–0	0–3	0–0
Himalayan Sherpa Club	3–2	1–1	0–0	—	0–1	1–2	1–3	1–1	2–1	1–1	1–1	1–0	0–1	1–0
Jawalakhel Youth Club	0–2	0–3	4–1	1–0	—	2–4	0–0	2–2	1–2	1–1	2–2	0–1	2–0	0–1
FC Khumaltar	3–1	0–2	1–3	2–1	4–2	—	0–3	0–1	0–2	2–3	3–0	1–0	2–2	2–2
Machhindra F.C.	2–1	1–2	2–2	3–1	0–0	3–0	—	3–1	1–2	2–0	3–1	3–1	1–1	1–0
Manang Marshyangdi Club	2–2	0–0	1–1	1–1	2–2	1–0	1–3	—	2–2	0–1	2–2	0–0	1–0	1–0
Nepal Police F.C.	1–0	0–1	2–1	1–2	2–1	2–0	2–1	2–2	—	1–0	2–1	1–0	1–1	1–0
New Road Team F.C.	1–1	1–4	2–2	1–1	1–1	3–2	0–2	1–0	0–1	—	1–1	2–1	1–0	0–0
Sankata BSC	1–2	1–0	1–1	1–1	2–2	3–0	1–3	2–2	1–2	1–1	—	2–0	1–1	0–0
Satdobato Youth Club	3–0	0–1	0–4	0–1	1–0	0–1	1–3	0–0	0–1	1–2	0–2	—	2–1	2–0
Tribhuvan Army F.C.	0–3	1–0	3–0	1–0	0–2	2–2	1–1	0–1	1–1	0–1	1–1	1–2	—	1–1
Three Star Club	1–1	0–0	0–0	0–1	1–0	2–2	0–1	0–1	0–1	0–0	0–0	0–2	1–1	—

Updated to match(es) played on 10 June 2023. Source: ANFA
Legend: Blue = home team win; Yellow = draw; Red = away team win.

==== Positions by round ====
Team ╲ Round	1	2	3	4	5	6	7	8	9	10	11	12	13	14	15	16	17	18	19	20	21	22	23	24	25	26
Church Boys United	4	1	1	1	3	3	3	3	4	2	3	5	4	2	1	1	2	1	1	1	1	1	1	1	1	1
Machhindra F.C.	13	14	13	12	11	11	9	8	7	9	6	7	7	5	4	4	3	3	3	2	2	2	2	2	2	2
Nepal Police F.C.	11	13	14	14	14	14	13	14	14	14	14	14	14	12	14	14	12	10	12	8	7	4	4	4	3	3
Jawalakhel YC	1	2	3	4	4	2	2	4	1	1	1	1	1	1	2	2	1	2	2	3	3	3	3	3	4	4
Satdobato Youth Club	3	3	2	2	1	4	4	1	2	4	4	3	3	4	5	5	4	5	4	4	6	7	9	5	5	5
New Road Team F.C.	12	12	11	13	13	13	12	12	13	11	10	11	9	9	11	12	9	9	9	11	8	8	10	10	6	6
Tribhuwan Army F.C.	8	4	4	9	5	8	8	6	8	5	5	4	5	6	6	7	6	6	6	5	5	5	6	11	9	7
Manang Marshyangdi Club	6	5	5	3	2	1	1	2	3	6	7	8	10	8	8	8	8	8	8	9	11	10	5	6	7	8
Three Star Club	14	11	8	6	7	6	6	5	5	3	2	2	2	3	3	3	5	4	5	6	10	11	11	12	12	13
Sankata BSC	9	10	6	8	8	7	7	7	6	7	8	9	8	11	10	10	11	12	11	10	13	12	12	9	8	9
Himalayan Sherpa Club	7	6	9	11	10	10	11	10	11	13	13	13	12	10	7	9	10	7	7	7	4	9	7	7	10	10
Friends Club	10	9	12	10	12	12	14	13	12	10	12	10	11	13	13	11	13	13	13	13	12	13	13	13	13	11
APF F.C.	2	7	7	5	6	5	5	9	9	8	9	6	6	7	9	6	7	11	10	12	9	6	8	8	11	12
FC Khumaltar	5	8	10	7	9	9	10	11	10	12	11	12	13	14	12	13	14	14	14	14	14	14	14	14	14	14

Leader
Relegation to B-Division

Updated to match(es) played on 10 June 2023. Source: ANFA

==== Results by games ====
Team ╲ Round	1	2	3	4	5	6	7	8	9	10	11	12	13	14	15	16	17	18	19	20	21	22	23	24	25	26
Church Boys United	W	W	W	D	D	D	D	D	D	W	L	L	W	W	W	W	L	W	W	D	D	L	W	W	D	W
Friends Club	L	D	L	W	L	L	L	D	W	W	L	W	D	L	D	W	L	D	D	L	W	L	D	D	D	W
Himalayan Sherpa Club	D	W	L	L	D	D	L	W	L	L	D	W	D	W	W	L	D	D	W	D	W	L	D	D	L	L
Jawalakhel YC	W	W	D	L	W	W	D	L	W	W	W	L	D	L	L	W	W	D	D	D	D	L	W	L	L	L
FC Khumaltar	W	L	L	W	L	L	D	L	W	L	W	L	L	D	W	L	L	L	D	W	L	W	L	L	W	L
Machhindra F.C.	L	L	D	W	D	D	W	W	D	L	W	D	D	W	W	L	W	W	D	W	D	D	W	L	W	W
Manang Marshyangdi Club	D	W	D	W	W	W	D	L	L	L	L	L	L	W	D	D	D	D	D	D	D	W	W	D	L	L
APF F.C.	W	L	D	W	L	W	D	L	L	W	L	W	D	D	L	W	L	L	L	D	W	W	L	D	L	L
Tribhuwan Army F.C.	D	W	D	L	W	L	D	W	L	W	D	W	D	L	D	L	W	D	D	W	L	D	L	L	D	W
Nepal Police F.C.	L	L	L	L	D	L	W	L	D	L	D	W	W	W	L	D	W	W	L	W	W	W	W	W	D	W
New Road Team F.C.	L	L	D	L	D	D	W	L	D	W	W	L	W	D	L	D	W	D	D	L	W	W	L	D	W	D
Sankata BSC	D	L	W	D	D	W	L	W	W	L	L	L	D	L	D	W	L	D	D	D	L	W	D	W	D	D
Satdobato Youth Club	W	W	W	L	W	L	D	W	D	L	D	W	D	L	D	L	W	L	W	L	L	L	L	W	W	L
Three Star Club	L	D	W	W	L	W	D	W	D	W	W	D	L	D	D	D	L	D	L	L	L	L	D	D	D	W

Updated to match(es) played on 10 June 2023. Source: ANFA
W = Win; D = Draw; L = Lose

== Season statistics ==
=== Scoring ===
==== Top Goal Scorers ====
As of 10 June 2023

Rank	Player	Team	Goals
1	(Nigeria) Afeez Olawale Oladipo	Machhindra FC	23
2	(Cameroon) Messouke Oloumou	Khumaltar FC	18
3	(Lesotho) Masoabi Nkoto	Jawalakhel YC	16
4	(Ghana) Rafiq Aminu	Friends	14
5	(Nepal) Dipak Raj Thakuri	Satdobato YC	12
6	(Cameroon) Stephane Binong	Khumaltar FC	10
7	(Togo) Koffi Timothée Koudo	Manang Marshyangdi Club	9

===== Hat-tricks =====
Player	For	Against	Result	Date
(Nigeria) Afeez Olawale Oladipo^{5}	Machhindra FC	Khumaltar FC	7–3	11 April 2023
(Cameroon) Stephane Binong	Khumaltar FC	Jawalakhel YC	4–2	5 May 2023
(Nepal) Anjan Bista	Church Boys	New Road Team	4–1	6 May 2023
(Nigeria) Afeez Olawale Oladipo	Machhindra FC	Satdobato YC	3–1	31 May 2023

- ^{5} Player scored 5 goals

=== Clean Sheets ===
As of 10 June 2023

Rank	Player	Team	Clean sheets
1	(Cameroon) Yves Priso	Church Boys	11
2	(Nepal) Bishal Shrestha	Machhindra FC	9
3	(Nepal) Deep Karki	Manang Marshyangdi Club	8
3	(Lebanon) Mohammad Taha	Three Star Club	8
3	(Nepal) Satrughan Chaudhary	Nepal Police Club	8
6	(Nepal) Abhishek Baral	Satdobato YC	7
6	(Nepal) Bikesh Kuthu	Tribhuvan Army Club	7
8	(Nepal) Tikendra Singh Thapa	Sankata BSC	6

== Awards ==
=== End-of-Season Awards ===
Award	Winner	Club
Player of the Season	(Nepal) Ananta Tamang	Church Boys United
Emerging Player	(Nepal) Laken Limbu	Three Star Club
Top Scorer	(Nigeria) Olawale Afeez Oladipo	Machhindra F.C.
Best Goalkeeper	(Cameroon) Yves Priso	Church Boys United
Fair Play	Nepal Police F.C.	

== Controversy ==
The All Nepal Football Association (ANFA) sanctioned Sankata BSC for delaying the kick-off of their match against Nepal APF FC and the latter club for delaying the kick-off of the second half of the game.

FC Khumaltar was also sanctioned for breaking locker-room chairs after a 7–3 loss to Machhindra FC at Chyasal Stadium.

After attempting to "attack" a referee following a 1–1 draw against New Road Team, players of Machhindra FC were sanctioned by ANFA.
