= Nicholas Fernandes =

Indian footballer

Personal information
- Full name: Nicholas Fernandes
- Date of birth: 29 May 1992 (age 34)
- Place of birth: Goa, India
- Position: Central midfielder

Team information
- Current team: New Road Team

Senior career*
Years	Team	Apps	(Gls)
2014–2015	Churchill Brothers	30	(1)
2015–2016	Sporting Goa		
2016–2019	Churchill Brothers	13	(0)
2020	Gokulam Kerala	1	(0)
2020–2021	Bengaluru United	8	(0)
2021	Three Star Club	0	(0)
2021–2022	Jawalakhel YC	7	(2)
2022–	New Road Team	0	(0)
- * Club domestic league appearances and goals as of 24 June 2022

Nicholas Fernandes (born 29 May 1992) is an Indian professional footballer who plays as an attacking midfielder for Martyr's Memorial A-Division League side New Road Team.

== Club career ==
=== In India ===
Born in Goa, Fernandes started his career with Churchill Brothers in the Goa Professional League. Before the 2015–16 I-League, Fernandes was loaned to Sporting Goa. He made his professional debut for the club in their opening match of the season against East Bengal. He played 65 minutes as Sporting Goa lost 3–1.

In 2020, he moved to Gokulam Kerala FC. He debuted for the Malabarians on 9 January in a 3–2 defeat to Chennai City. He played his last match on 21 February against NEROCA in their 3–2 loss.

In March 2021, Fernandes signed with FC Bengaluru United for season-long deal. He was part of the team's 2020–21 season of the BDFA Super Division League win.

=== In Nepal ===
In October 2021, Fernandes moved to Nepal and signed with Martyr's Memorial A-Division League side Three Star Club for their 2021 season as a SAARC-quota player.

Few days later, he moved to another Martyr's Memorial A-Division League side Jawalakhel Youth Club for season-long deal. He debuted for the club on 21 November in a 1–0 defeat to Manang Marshyangdi Club. He scored his first goal on 18 December against Chyasal Youth Club in their 1–0 win. He scored his second goal on 27 December in their 2–0 win against Satdobato Youth Club.

On June 23, 2022, another Nepali outfit New Road Team announced the signing of nine new faces including Fernandes as SAARC quota player from India, and set on the pre-season tour to Malaysia and Thailand. In a statement issued by the club's general secretary Narendraman Shrestha, NRT will participate in the inaugural tournament Tuan Yang Terut Cup (TYT Cup) in Penang, Malaysia, organized by Melaka United, in the pre-season targeting the upcoming A-Division league. On 30 June, he was selected in the starting eleven and appeared in the tournament opener against Indonesian Liga 2 side Karo United in their 5–1 defeat. They again suffered a heavy defeat, by 5–0, in their second match against Malaysia Super League side Penang.

== Career statistics ==
As of 10 February 2018

Club	Season	League			League Cup		Domestic Cup		Continental		Total	
Club	Season	Division	Apps	Goals	Apps	Goals	Apps	Goals	Apps	Goals	Apps	Goals
Sporting Goa	2015–16	I-League	14	2	0	0	0	0	—	—	14	2
Churchill Brothers	2016–17	I-League	1	0	0	0	0	0	—	—	1	0
Churchill Brothers	2017–18	I-League	11	1	0	0	0	0	—	—	11	1
Churchill Brothers	2018–19	I-League	13	0	0	0	0	0	—	—	13	0
Career total			39	3	0	0	0	0	0	0	39	3

== Honours ==
Sporting clube de Goa

- Goa Professional League: 2015–16

Bengaluru United

- Bangalore Super Division: 2020–21

== See also ==
- List of Indian football players in foreign leagues
