= Sonam Bhutia =

Indian footballer (born 1994)

Personal information
- Full name: Sonam Zangpo Bhutia
- Date of birth: 26 January 1994 (age 32)
- Place of birth: Shotak, Sikkim, India
- Position: Defender

Team information
- Current team: Machhindra

Youth career
- Sports Authority of India

Senior career*
Years	Team	Apps	(Gls)
2012–2014	United Sikkim	8	(0)
2014–2016	Mohun Bagan	0	(0)
2016	Mohammedan	3	(0)
2017–2019	Langsning	4	(0)
2021	Southern Samity	7	(0)
2021–	Machhindra	1	(0)
- * Club domestic league appearances and goals

Sonam Bhutia (born 26 January 1994) is an Indian professional footballer who plays as a midfielder for Machhindra FC in the Martyr's Memorial A-Division League.

== Club career ==
=== Early career ===
Born and brought up in Shotak, Sikkim, Sonam Bhutia is a product of the Sports Authority of India, Namchi. He was part of the SAI squad that participated in the Subroto Cup in 2008. Though his team lost in the semi-final stage, Sonam who played in central defense got a scholarship for good performance.

Bhutia had a brief stint at the Mohun Bagan SAIL Football Academy. When Mohun Bagan SAIL Football Academy went to participate in a tournament at Namchi, Shyam Thapa spotted Sonam and selected him for the Durgapur based Mohun Bagan Academy. However, after 4 months, Sonam went back to Namchi because of his schooling. Though Sonam got offer from United Sikkim around 4–5 years back, he joined the club in 2012 after completing his studies and played there for a couple of seasons.

He represented Sikkim in the Santosh Trophy for 3 consecutive seasons from 2009 onwards. He also appeared in the 2018–19 National Football Championship (73rd edition of Santosh Trophy), in which Sikkim qualified for the final round for the first time since 2004. He was selected in the U-23 Indian Camp held at Bangalore last year, but due to passport issues, he was not kept in the final squad.

He also appeared with Ulkha Football Club of Siliguri, at the Siliguri Super Division League.

=== United Sikkim ===
Bhutia made his debut for United Sikkim FC on 24 January 2013 during an I-League match against Mohun Bagan at the Salt Lake Stadium in Kolkata, West Bengal in which he came on as a 69th-minute substitute for Sandesh Jhingan; United Sikkim drew the match 0–0.

In March 2013, Nathan Hall managed United Sikkim went to Bhutan for training. With the team, Bhutia played three friendly matches against local sides Drukpol FC, Yeedzin and Zimdra, at the Changlimithang Stadium in Thimpu. From July to August 2013, he went to Bhutan again and participated in 2013 King's Cup, in which they moved to the knockout stages. In the first semi-final, United Sikkim lost 2–4 to Manang Marshyangdi of Nepal.

=== Mohun Bagan ===
In August 2014, Sonam joined Mohun Bagan, and appeared in the Calcutta Football League.

=== Mohammedan ===
On 2 August 2016, it was announced that Bhutia had signed with Mohammedan. He was part of the team, that clinched 36th Sikkim Governor's Gold Cup, defeating Jhapa XI of Nepal 1–0 at the Paljor Stadium.

=== Langsning ===
On 1 July 2017, Bhutia moved to Shillong Premier League side Langsning SC.

=== Southern Samity ===
In July 2021, he moved to another Calcutta Football League side Southern Samity.

=== Machhindra ===
In December 2021, Bhutia moved to Nepal and signed with Martyr's Memorial A-Division League side Machhindra F.C. on a season-long deal. He debuted on 2 January 2022, in their 1–0 win against Nepal Police Club. Later Machhindra lifted the league trophy and earned a spot in the 2022 AFC Cup qualifying play-offs.

On 5 April, Machhindra appeared in the match against Blue Star of Sri Lanka at the Dasharath Rangasala Stadium but bowed out of the tournament losing 2–1.

== Career statistics ==
=== Club ===
Statistics accurate as of 12 May 2013

Club	Season	League		Federation Cup		AFC		Total	
Club	Season	Apps	Goals	Apps	Goals	Apps	Goals	Apps	Goals
United Sikkim	2012–13	8	0	0	0	—	—	8	0
Career total		8	0	0	0	0	0	8	0

== Honours ==
United Sikkim

- I-League 2nd Division: 2012
- Sikkim Premier Division League: 2013; runner-up 2014

Mohun Bagan

- Federation Cup: 2015–16

Mohamedan Sporting

- Sikkim Governor's Gold Cup: 2016

Macchindra

- Martyr's Memorial A-Division League: 2021–22

== See also ==
- List of Indian football players in foreign leagues
- Indian Nepalis
