= 2019 Martyr's Memorial B-Division League =

Martyr's Memorial B-Division League
- Season: 2019
- Champions: Ranipokhari Corner Team
- Matches: 36
- Goals: 113 (3.14 per match)
- Top goalscorer: Darshan Gurung (9 goals)

The 2019 Martyr's Memorial B-Division League was the 2019 season of the Martyr's Memorial B-Division League. A total of 12 teams competed in the league. The season started on 8 February and concluded on 5 March. The league did not have promotion to the Martyr's Memorial A-Division League and teams were not relegated to the Martyr's Memorial C-Division League, the bottom teams of each group however will have a one point deduction in the next edition of the league.

== Teams ==
A total of 12 teams compete in the league, including 10 sides from the 2016 season and two sides promoted from the 2016 Martyr's Memorial C-Division League.

=== Team changes ===
| Promoted from 2016 C-Division League | Promoted to 2018-19 A-Division League | Relegated from 2016 B-Division League |
|---|---|---|
| Shree Bhagwati Club; Jhamsikhel Youth Club | Chyasal Youth Club; New Road Team | Samajik Youth Club; Mahabir Youth Club |

=== Location ===
| Team | Location | Previous Season |
|---|---|---|
| Nayabasti Youth Club | Gokarneshwar, Kathmandu | 12th |
| Bansbari Club | Kathmandu, Kathmandu | 9th |
| Ranipokhari Corner Team | Kathmandu, Kathmandu | 3rd |
| Shree Kumari Club | Kathmandu, Kathmandu | 5th |
| Madhyapur Youth Association | Madhyapur Thimi, Bhaktapur | 11th |
| Boys Union Club | Lalitpur, Lalitpur | 8th |
| Jhamsikhel Youth Club | Lalitpur, Lalitpur | 2nd (2016 C-Division) |
| Khumaltar Youth Club | Lalitpur, Lalitpur | 7th |
| Pulchowk Sports Club | Lalitpur, Lalitpur | 6th |
| Satdobato Youth Club | Lalitpur, Lalitpur | 4th |
| Tushal Youth Club | Lalitpur, Lalitpur | 10th |
| Shree Bhagwati Club | Tokha, Kathmandu | 1st (2016 C-Division) |

=== Personnel and kits ===
| Team | Head Coach | Captain | Kit sponsor |
|---|---|---|---|
| Nayabasti Youth Club | | | |
| Bansbari Club | | | Spark Health Home Hospital |
| Ranipokhari Corner Team | Baiju Kapali | | |
| Shree Kumari Club | | | Mega Bank Nepal Limited |
| Madhyapur Youth Association | | | |
| Boys Union Club | | | Divine Wines |
| Jhamsikhel Youth Club | | | |
| Khumaltar Youth Club | | | Ruslan |
| Pulchowk Sports Club | | | |
| Satdobato Youth Club | | | Ruslan |
| Tushal Youth Club | | | |
| Shree Bhagwati Club | | | |

== First round ==
=== Group A ===
| Pos | Team | Pld | W | D | L | GF | GA | GD | Pts | Qualification |
|---|---|---|---|---|---|---|---|---|---|---|
| 1 | Satdobato Youth Club | 5 | 3 | 2 | 0 | 8 | 4 | +4 | 11 | Advance to Final Round |
| 2 | Ranipokhari Corner Team | 5 | 2 | 2 | 1 | 8 | 6 | +2 | 8 | Advance to Final Round |
| 3 | Jhamsikhel Youth Club | 5 | 2 | 1 | 2 | 4 | 5 | −1 | 7 | |
| 4 | Shree Kumari Club | 5 | 2 | 0 | 3 | 8 | 7 | +1 | 6 | |
| 5 | Boys Union Club | 5 | 1 | 2 | 2 | 3 | 5 | −2 | 5 | |
| 6 | Nayabasti Youth Club | 5 | 1 | 1 | 3 | 4 | 8 | −4 | 4 | |

Source: GoalNepal
Rules for classification: 1) points; 2) goal difference; 3) head-to-head.

=== Group B ===
| Pos | Team | Pld | W | D | L | GF | GA | GD | Pts | Qualification |
|---|---|---|---|---|---|---|---|---|---|---|
| 1 | Tushal Youth Club | 5 | 3 | 2 | 0 | 13 | 7 | +6 | 11 | Advance to Final Round |
| 2 | Shree Bhagwati Club | 5 | 3 | 1 | 1 | 16 | 4 | +12 | 10 | Advance to Final Round |
| 3 | Pulchowk Sports Club | 5 | 2 | 1 | 2 | 8 | 13 | −5 | 7 | |
| 4 | Madhyapur Youth Association | 5 | 2 | 0 | 3 | 6 | 8 | −2 | 6 | |
| 5 | Khumaltar Youth Club | 5 | 2 | 0 | 3 | 10 | 17 | −7 | 6 | |
| 6 | Bansbari Club | 5 | 0 | 2 | 3 | 6 | 10 | −4 | 2 | |

Source: GoalNepal
Rules for classification: 1) points; 2) goal difference; 3) head-to-head.

== Final Round ==
| Pos | Team | Pld | W | D | L | GF | GA | GD | Pts |
|---|---|---|---|---|---|---|---|---|---|
| 1 | Ranipokhari Corner Team (C) | 3 | 3 | 0 | 0 | 5 | 1 | +4 | 9 |
| 2 | Shree Bhagwati Club | 3 | 2 | 0 | 1 | 7 | 5 | +2 | 6 |
| 3 | Tushal Youth Club | 3 | 1 | 0 | 2 | 4 | 6 | −2 | 3 |
| 4 | Satdobato Youth Club | 3 | 0 | 0 | 3 | 4 | 8 | −4 | 0 |

Source: GoalNepal
Rules for classification: 1) points; 2) goal difference; 3) head-to-head.
(C) Champions

== Season statistics ==
As of 3 March 2019

=== Top scorers ===
| Rank | Player | Team | Goals |
|---|---|---|---|
| 1 | Darshan Gurung | Shree Bhagwati Club | 9 |
| 2 | Alon Rai | Tushal Youth Club | 5 |
| 2 | Tika Raj Gurung | Pulchowk Sports Club | 5 |
| 3 | Mohan Thapa Magar | Shree Bhagwati Club | 4 |
| 3 | Sansar Nanda Palanchoke | Ranipokhari Corner Team | 4 |
| 4 | Sabin KC | Khumaltar Youth Club | 3 |
| 4 | Unam Budhathoki | Ranipokhari Corner Team | 3 |
| 4 | Karlos Bakhariya | Shree Bhagwati Club | 3 |
| 4 | Karan Rawat | Tushal Youth Club | 3 |
| 4 | Manish Sedai | Tushal Youth Club | 3 |

=== Hat-tricks ===
| Player | For | Against | Result | Date | Ref |
|---|---|---|---|---|---|
| Alon Rai | Tushal Youth Club | Khumaltar Youth Club | 7–2 | 15 February 2019 | |
| Darshan Gurung^{4} | Shree Bhagwati Club | Pulchowk Sports Club | 6–0 | 18 February 2019 | |
| Mohan Thapa Magar | Shree Bhagwati Club | Satdobato Youth Club | 4–3 | 1 March 2019 | |

== Awards ==
| Award | Winner | Club |
|---|---|---|
| Best Coach | Baiju Kapali | Ranipokhari Corner Team |
| Best Goalkeeper | Binod Sodari | Tushal Youth Club |
| Best Defender | Lokendra Bahadur Karki | Ranipokhari Corner Team |
| Best Midfielder | Darshan Gurung | Shree Bhagwati Club |
| Best Forward | Birendra Limbu | Satdobato Youth Club |
