= Darshan Gurung =

Former Nepalese footballer

Personal information
- Date of birth: 20 August 2002 (age 24)
- Place of birth: Ilam, Nepal
- Height: 1.73 m (5 ft 8 in)
- Position: Midfielder

Team information
- Current team: New Road Team
- Number: 14

Senior career*
Years	Team	Apps	(Gls)
2019	Shree Bhagwati Club	8	(9)
2019–2022	New Road Team	25	(7)
2021 (draft)	Dhangadhi F.C.	7	(1)

International career^{‡}
2017	Nepal U16	3	(0)
2019	Nepal U19	1	(0)
2021	Nepal U23	3	(0)
2020–2022	Nepal	8	(2)
- * Club domestic league appearances and goals as of 17:11, 3 June 2022 (UTC) ‡ National team caps and goals as of 11:15, 23 June 2022 (UTC)

Darshan Gurung (born 20 August 2002) is a Nepalese former professional footballer who last played as a midfielder for New Road Team (NRT) and the Nepal national team. In July 2022, Gurung decided to leave professional football and move to Australia. He made his international debut against Bangladesh on 13 November 2020 in Dhaka.

== Early life ==
Darshan Gurung was born & raised in Ilam, Nepal.

== Club career ==
In 2019, Gurung made his professional debut from Bhagwati Youth Club in 2019 Martyr's Memorial B-Division League(2nd tier league of Nepal), where he scored nine goals and became top goal scorer of the league.

In the same year, Martyr's Memorial A-Division League team NRT signed him as free agent. Gurung scored three goals and won Emerging Player award in the league.

In 2021, Gurung was bought by Dhangadhi F.C. for Rs.100,00 in auction for Nepal Super League.

== International career ==
In 2017, Gurung was named in Nepal U-16 for AFC U-16 Championship qualification tournament. He made his U16 debut against Iraq U-16.

On November 13, 2020, Gurung made his debut for Nepal national team against Bangladesh in Dhaka as substitute replacing Ravi Paswan in 69th minute.

== Career statistics ==
=== Club ===
Season	Club	League	League		Continental		Total	
Season	Club	League	Apps	Goals	Apps	Goals	Apps	Goals
2019	Shree Bhagwati Club	Martyr's Memorial B-Division League	8	9	-	-	8	9
2019	Shree Bhagwati Club	Total	8	9	-	-	8	9
2019-20	New Road Team	Martyr's Memorial A-Division League	13	3	-	-	13	3
2019-20	New Road Team	Total	13	3	-	-	13	3
2021	Dhangadhi FC	Nepal Super League	7	1	-	-	7	1
2021	Dhangadhi FC	Total	7	1	-	-	7	1
2021	New Road Team	Martyr's Memorial A-Division League	12	4	-	-	12	4
2021	New Road Team	Total	12	4	-	-	12	4
Career total			40	17	0	0	40	17

=== International ===
No.	Date	Venue	Opponent	Score	Result	Competition
1.	28 May 2022	Grand Hamad Stadium, Doha, Qatar	Timor-Leste	1–2	2–2	Friendly
2.	11 June 2022	Jaber Al-Ahmad International Stadium, Kuwait City, Kuwait	Kuwait	1–4	1–4	2023 AFC Asian Cup qualification
