= 2014 Martyr's Memorial B-Division League =

Martyr's Memorial B-Division League
- Season: 2014
- Champions: Brigade Boys Club
- Promoted: Brigade Boys Club
- Relegated: Birgunj Youth Academy Club; Boudha F.C.
- Matches: 78
- Goals: 183 (2.35 per match)
- Top goalscorer: 10 goals Som Thapa

The 2013 Martyr's Memorial B-Division League season, also known as the RedBull Martyr's Memorial B-Division League for sponsorship reasons, was the 2013 season of the Martyr's Memorial B-Division League. A total of 13 teams competed in the league. The season began on 4 March 2014 and concluded on 24 April 2014.

== Teams ==
Of the 13 participating teams, eight remain following the 2013 Martyr's Memorial B-Division League. They are joined by two teams promoted from the Martyr's Memorial C-Division League and three relegated from the 2012–13 Martyr's Memorial A-Division League.

Naya Basti Youth Club was promoted from the 2012 Martyr's Memorial C-Division League. Whereas, Madhyapur Youth Association, Bansbari Football Club and Boudha Football Club were relegated from the 2012-13 Martyr's Memorial A-Division League.

Boys Union Club were promoted to the 2013–14 Martyr's Memorial A-Division League from the previous season. Swoyambhu Club and United Club had to withdraw from the competition due to financial reasons and were relegated to the Martyr's Memorial C-Division League.

Team	Location	Previous Season
Madhyapur Youth Association	Bhaktapur, Bhaktapur	14th (2012–13 A-Division League)
Birgunj Youth Academy Club	Birgunj, Parsa	3rd
Bansbari Football Club	Kathmandu, Kathmandu	15th (2012–13 A-Division League)
Boudha Football Club	Kathmandu, Kathmandu	16th (2012–13 A-Division League)
Mahabir Club	Kathmandu, Kathmandu	10th
Naya Basti Youth Club	Kathmandu, Kathmandu	1st (2012 C-Division League)
Samajik Youth Club	Kathmandu, Kathmandu	4th
Shree Kumari Club	Kathmandu, Kathmandu	7th
Tushal Youth Club	Kathmandu, Kathmandu	2nd
Brigade Boys Club	Lalitpur, Lalitpur	5th
Chyasal Youth Club	Lalitpur, Lalitpur	12th
Pulchowk Sports Club	Lalitpur, Lalitpur	11th
Satdobato Youth Club	Lalitpur, Lalitpur	8th

== Venues ==
The league was played centrally in one venues in Kathmandu.

Nepal

Kathmandu
Dasarath Rangasala
Capacity: 15,000
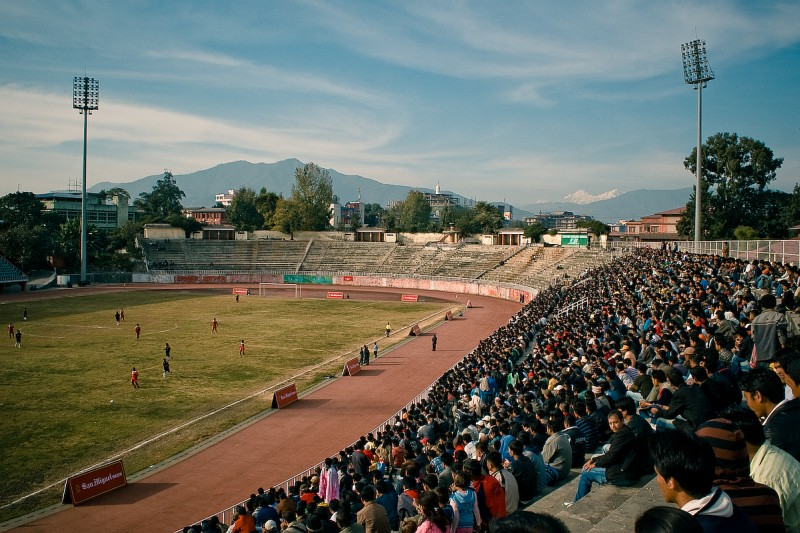

== League table ==
Pos	Team	Pld	W	D	L	GF	GA	GD	Pts	Promotion or relegation
1	Brigade Boys Club (C, P)	12	8	3	1	18	6	+12	27	Promotion to 2018–19 Martyr's Memorial A-Division League
2	Madhyapur Youth Association	12	7	4	1	17	10	+7	25	
3	Samajik Youth Club	12	6	2	4	14	15	−1	20	
4	Naya Basti Youth Club	12	5	3	4	17	14	+3	18	
5	Satdobato Youth Club	12	4	5	3	14	14	0	17	
6	Mahabir Club	12	5	1	6	17	16	+1	16 (Note: MAH 2-1 TUS)	
7	Tushal Youth Club	12	4	4	4	14	10	+4	16	
8	Chyasal Youth Club	12	3	5	4	16	14	+2	14 (Note: CYC: 4 pts; SKC: 2 pts; PUL: 1 pt)	
9	Shree Kumari Club	12	2	8	2	10	10	0	14	
10	Pulchowk Sports Club	12	3	5	4	13	15	−2	14	
11	Bansbari Football Club	12	4	1	7	15	16	−1	13	
12	Boudha Football Club (R)	12	3	1	8	11	19	−8	10	Relegation to 2016 Martyr's Memorial C-Division League
13	Birgunj Youth Academy Club (R)	12	0	6	6	7	24	−17	6	Relegation to 2016 Martyr's Memorial C-Division League

Updated to match(es) played on 18 April 2014. Source:
Rules for classification: 1) points, 2) head-to-head points, 3) head-to-head goal difference, 4) goal difference
(C) Champions; (P) Promoted; (R) Relegated

== Awards ==
	Player	Club
Best Coach	(Nepal) Sanoj Shrestha	Brigade Boys Club
Best Goalkeeper	(Nepal) Raj Bahadur Thapa	Chyasal Youth Club
Best Defender	(Nepal) Naresh Limbu	Madhyapur Youth Association
Best Midfielder	(Nepal) Tanka Gurung	Pulchowk Sports Club
Best Striker	(Nepal) Dipen Rai	Brigade Boys Club
