= Prashant Awasthi =

Prashant Awasthi may refer to:

- Prashant Awasthi (cricketer) (born 1990), Indian cricketer
- Prashant Awasthi (footballer) (born 1998), Nepalese footballer
