= Bishal Basnet =

Nepalese footballer (born 2002)

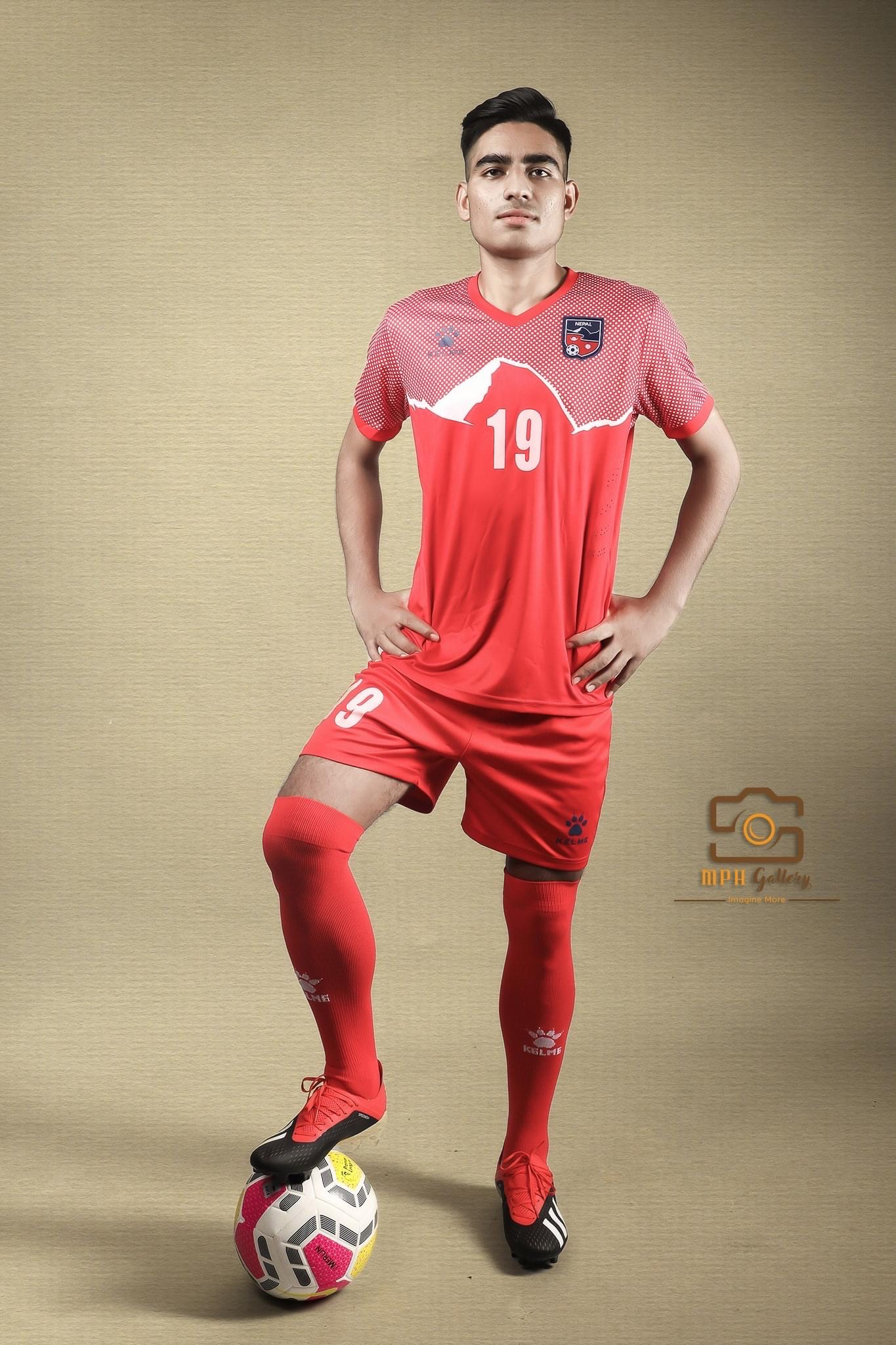

Personal information
- Full name: Bishal Basnet
- Date of birth: 29 April 2002 (age 24)
- Place of birth: Jhapa, Nepal
- Height: 1.75 m (5 ft 9 in)
- Position: Left-back

Team information
- Current team: Jhapa
- Number: 6

Senior career*
Years	Team	Apps	(Gls)
2018–19	Manang Marshyangdi		
2019–20	Nepal Police		
2021–22	Brigade Boys	5	(0)
2022	FC Chitwan	0	(0)
2022–23	FC Khumaltar	24	(0)
2023–	Jhapa	6	(0)

International career^{‡}
2019	Nepal U19		
2024–	Nepal	2	(0)
- * Club domestic league appearances and goals as of 22 December 2024 ‡ National team caps and goals as of 26 March 2024

Bishal Basnet (Nepali: बिशाल बस्नेत; born 29 April 2002) is a Nepalese professional footballer who played as a defender for Martyr's Memorial A-Division League club Jhapa FC and the Nepal national team.

== International career ==
On 26 March 2024, Bishal made his senior national team debut against Bahrain as an 84th minute substitute in the 2026 FIFA World Cup qualification – AFC second round.
