= Planning Boyz United =

Nepalese football club

- Founded: 2012; 14 years ago
- Ground: Dasarath Rangasala Stadium, Kathmandu
- Capacity: 15,000
- Manager: Sasendra Dhimal
- League: Martyr's Memorial A-Division League; Nepal National League (sometimes)
- 2025: B-Division, 1st
| Home colours | Away colours |

Planning Boyz United is a Nepali professional football club from the Kapan neighborhood of Budhanilkantha. They play in the Nepalese first division, the Martyr's Memorial A-Division League after being promoted in the 2025 Martyr's Memorial B-Division League.

== History ==
The club was founded in 2012. From 2012 to 2021 they played in the third-tier Martyr's Memorial C-Division League from which they were promoted in 2022.

== League finishes ==
| Champions | Runners-up | Third place | Promoted | Relegated |

The season-by-season performance of Planning Boyz United since establishment in 2012:

| Season | League | Position |
|---|---|---|
| 2012 | Martyr's Memorial C-Division League | 4th |
| 2014 | Martyr's Memorial C-Division League | 4th (Group B) |
| 2015 | League not held due to aftermath of the 2015 Nepal earthquake | |
| 2016 | Martyr's Memorial C-Division League | ? |
| 2017–2018 | No league held | |
| 2019 | Martyr's Memorial C-Division League | ? |
| 2020-21 | Martyr's Memorial C-Division League | 2nd |
| 2022 | Martyr's Memorial C-Division League | 2nd |
| 2025 | 2025 Martyr's Memorial B-Division League | 1st |
| 2026 | Martyr's Memorial A-Division League | TBD |
