= 2024 Martyr's Memorial C-Division League =

Martyr's Memorial C-Division League
- Season: 2024
- Dates: 4 April – 12 June 2024
- Top goalscorer: Roshan Chhetri (12 goals)
- All statistics correct as of 4 May 2025.

The 2024 Martyr's Memorial C-Division League, marking the 2024 (2080/81 BS) edition, kicked off on 4 April 2024, bringing competitive football back after a two-year break. In the previous season held in 2022, Jhapa Football Club claimed victory, securing their promotion to the 2025 B Division, while Planning Boyz United followed closely as runners-up, earning their place alongside them.

== Team changes ==
Entering league		Exiting league	
Promoted from C-Division League Qualifier ▲	Relegated from 2022 B-Division League ▼	Promoted to 2026 B-Division League▲	Relegated to C-Division League Qualifier▼
Bagmati Youth Club; Golbazar Sports Club	Jhamsikhel Youth Club; Samajik Youth Club	Bagmati Youth Club; RC32 Football Academy	Raniban Sports Club; Golbazar Sports Club

== Clubs ==
A total of 14 teams in the regular season will contest the league with a relegation system. Ten teams from the 2022 season, two teams relegated from the 2022 B Division leagues, and two teams promoted from the 2022 C-Division League Qualifier will participate in the league.

Team	Stadium	Province	Location	Previous Season
Bagmati Youth Club		Madhesh	Sarlahi	1st (C-Division Qualifier ) 2022
Golbazar Sports Club		Madhesh	Siraha	2nd (C-Division Qualifier ) 2022
Jhamshikhel Youth Club		Bagmati	Lalitpur (Jhamsikhel)	14th (B-Division) 2022
Khalibari Yuba Football Club		Bagmati	Lalitpur (Lagankhel)	8th
Mahabir Club		Bagmati	Kathmandu (Dillibazar)	6th
Manohara United Youth Club	Townplanning Football Ground	Bagmati	Kathmandu (Pepsicola)	11th
Pulchowk Sports Club		Bagmati	Lalitpur (Pulchowk)	5th
Raniban Sports Club		Sudurpashchim	Bajura	7th
RC32 Football Academy	Karnali Province Stadium	Karnali	Surkhet (Birendranagar)	3rd
Samajik Youth Club		Bagmati	Kathmandu (Koteshwor)	13th (B-Division) 2022
Sanepa Club		Bagmati	Lalitpur (Sanepa)	4th
Social Welfare Sports Center		Bagmati	Kavre (Banepa)	9th
Sports Academy Sanga		Bagmati	Kavre (Banepa)	10th
Swoyambhu Club		Bagmati	Kathmandu (Swyambhu)	12th

== Venues ==
The league was played centrally in one venue in Lalitpur. For the final matchday, selected matches were played at Dasharath Rangasala.

Nepal

Kathmandu	Lalitpur
Dasharath Rangasala	ANFA Complex
Capacity: 15,000	Capacity: 6,000

== League table ==
Pos	Team	Pld	W	D	L	GF	GA	GD	Pts	Qualification
1	Bagmati Youth Club (C)	13	9	3	1	0	0	0	30	Promotion to 2026 Martyr's Memorial B-Division League
2	RC32 Football Academy	13	8	2	3	0	0	0	26	Promotion to 2026 Martyr's Memorial B-Division League
3	Pulchowk Sports Club	13	6	4	3	0	0	0	22	
4	Samajik Youth Club	13	6	4	3	0	0	0	22	
5	Khalibari Yuba Football Club	13	5	5	3	0	0	0	20	
6	Social Welfare Sports Center	13	5	4	4	0	0	0	19	
7	Sanepa Club	13	5	3	5	0	0	0	18	
8	Jhamshikhel Youth Club	13	5	1	7	0	0	0	16	
9	Sports Academy Sanga	13	5	1	7	0	0	0	16	
10	Mahabir Club	13	4	4	5	0	0	0	16	
11	Manohara United Youth Club	13	4	3	6	0	0	0	15	
12	Swoyambhu Club	13	3	5	5	0	0	0	14	
13	Raniban Sports Club	13	1	5	7	0	0	0	8	Relegation to 2025 Martyr's Memorial C-Division League Qualifiers
14	Golbalbazar Sports Club	13	1	4	8	0	0	0	7	Relegation to 2025 Martyr's Memorial C-Division League Qualifiers

Updated to match(es) played on 4 May 2025. Source: Martyr's Memorial B-Division League
Rules for classification: 1) Points; 2) head-to-head; 3) Goal difference; 4) Goals scored.
(C) Champions

== Awards ==
=== End-of-Season Awards ===
Award	Winner	Club
Most Valuable Player	(Nepal) Rohan Karki	RC32 Football Academy
Top Scorer	(Nepal) Roshan Chhetri	Social Welfare Sports Center
Best Goalkeeper	(Nepal) Anish Mahato	Bagmati Youth Club
Fair Play	Samajik Youth Club	

== Broadcast rights ==
All the matches are streams on ANFA's Social Media Platforms.
