= Sunil Bal =

Nepalese footballer

Personal information
- Full name: Sunil Bal
- Date of birth: 1 January 1998 (age 28)
- Place of birth: Churiyamai, Nepal
- Height: 1.63 m (5 ft 4 in)
- Position: Midfielder

Team information
- Current team: Machhindra F.C.
- Number: 9

Senior career*
Years	Team	Apps	(Gls)
2016–2019	Three Star Club		
2019–2020	Chyasal Youth Club		
2020	Biratnagar City FC	6	(0)
2021–	Machhindra F.C.	8	(5)

International career^{‡}
2018–	Nepal	30	(1)
Medal record
Winner	Three Nations Cup	2021
- * Club domestic league appearances and goals ‡ National team caps and goals as of 2 September 2021

Sunil Bal (Nepali: सुनिल बलl; born 1 January 1998) is a Nepalese footballer who plays as a midfielder for Martyr's Memorial A-Division League club Machhindra F.C. and the Nepal national team.

== International career ==
Sunil's first international match was against Pakistan, as a substitute in 2018 at Bangabandhu National Stadium, Dhaka. His first match as a starter was against Bhutan the same year where he scored his first international goal while also assisting in two others in Nepal's 4-0 win.

== Career statistics ==
=== International ===
As of match played 29 March 2021

National team	Year	Caps	Goals
Nepal	2018	4	1
Nepal	2019	3	0
Nepal	2020	2	0
Nepal	2021	2	0
Total		11	1

Scores and results list Nepal's goal tally first.

No.	Date	Venue	Opponent	Score	Result	Competition
1	6 September 2018	Bangabandhu National Stadium, Dhaka	Bhutan	2–0	4–0	2018 SAFF Championship

== Honours ==
Nepal

- 2021 Three Nations Cup: 2021
