= Bishnu Gurung =

Nepali footballer (born 1986)

Personal information
- Date of birth: 24 October 1986 (age 40)
- Place of birth: Nepal
- Position: Midfielder

Youth career
- Sahara Club

Senior career*
Years	Team	Apps	(Gls)
2006–2016	Three Star Club		

Managerial career
- 2019: Nepal (futsal)
- 2021–2022: Sankata Boys SC
- 2022: Nepal (assistant)
- 2022: Biratnagar City FC
- 2023: FC Khumaltar
- 2023: Nepal U17 (women)
- 2023: Manang Marshyangdi Club
- 2023–: Fewa FC
- * Club domestic league appearances and goals

Bishnu Gurung (Nepali: विष्णु गुरुङ; born 24 October 1986) is a Nepali former professional footballer and current head coach.

== Playing career ==
As a youth player, Gurung joined the youth academy of Nepali side Sahara Club. In 2006, he started his senior career with Nepali side Three Star Club, helping the club win three league titles. From 2007 to 2009, he worked in Iraq.

== Managerial career ==
Gurung started his managerial career with the Nepal national futsal team in 2019 and managed the team for 2020 AFC Futsal Championship qualification. Two years later, he was appointed manager of Nepali side Sankata Boys SC, before being appointed as an assistant manager of the Nepal national football team in 2022. The same year, he was appointed manager of Nepali side Biratnagar City FC. While managing the club, Nepali news website GoalNepal wrote that he was "touted to be one of the best up-and-coming coaches in Nepal".

Ahead of the 2023 season, he was appointed manager of Nepali side FC Khumaltar. Shortly afterwards, he was appointed manager of the Nepal women's national under-17 football team in 2023. During the summer of 2023, he was appointed manager of Nepali side Manang Marshyangdi Club. Following his stint there, he was appointed manager of Australian side Fewa FC the same year.
