= Nepalese football league system =

- Country: Nepal
- Sport: Association football
- Promotion and relegation: Partial (for men); No (for women)

National system
- Federation: All Nepal Football Association
- Confederation: AFC
- Top division: A-Division League (men); ANFA Women's League (women)
- Second division: Martyr's Memorial B-Division League

The Nepalese football league hierarchy features a comprehensive system encompassing two professional leagues, two semi-professional leagues, and various amateur leagues catering to football clubs across the nation.

At the top tier stands the Martyr's Memorial A-Division League, inaugurated in 1954. Below it are the semi-professional leagues, including the Martyr's Memorial B-Division League, established in 2003, serving as the second division, and the Martyr's Memorial C-Division League and Martyr's Memorial C-Division League Qualifier, also known as the D-Division, was founded in 2003 and represents the third and fourth divisions, respectively.

Since 2021, a private sector-owned and ANFA-supported professional franchise football league called the Nepal Super League has been organized. Though the league is professional, it is still not included in the league tier system.

For women's football, the premier competition is the ANFA Women's League, previously referred to as the National Women's League of Nepal, which began in 1998.

This structure ensures a pathway for clubs to progress and develop within the Nepalese football ecosystem.

== Criticism ==
Due to poor planning, influence of Political Parties and Corruption after 2015 there is not happening the league and Matches in Nepal.

== Men's ==
A-Divisioin League, B-Divisioin League, C-Divisioin League and C-Divisioin League Qualifiers are the top 3 tier Football leagues organized by ANFA and other province leagues organized by the respective province football Association.

=== Pyramid ===
Level	Franchise/Division leagues
Franchise League	Nepal Super League; 7 clubs – ↓ No relegation
Tier 1	Martyr's Memorial A-Division League; 14 clubs – ↓ 2 relegation
Tier 2	Martyr's Memorial B-Division League; 14 clubs – 2 promotions ↑↓ 2 relegations
Tier 3	Martyr's Memorial C-Division League; 14 clubs – 2 promotions ↑↓ 2 relegations
Tier 4	Martyr's Memorial C-Division League Qualifiers all clubs can participate in the qualification process – 2 promotions ↑

=== National League ===
Level	National leagues						
Tier 1	Nepal National League Top 6 Clubs from A- Division League & Top 4 Clubs From ANFA President League						
Tier 2	ANFA President League Top (4 Clubs) ↑						
	Province leagues						
	Koshi	Madhesh	Bagmati	Gandaki	Lumbini	Karnali	Sudurpashchim
Tier 3	Koshi Province Premier League Winner & Runner-up (2 Clubs) ↑	Madhesh Province Football League Winner (1 Club) ↑	Bagmati Province Football League Winner & Runner-up (2 Clubs) ↑	Gandaki Province Football League Winner (1 Club) ↑	Lumbini Province Football League Winner (1 Club) ↑	Karnali Province Football League Winner (1 Club) ↑	Sudurpashchim Province Football League Winner (1 Club) ↑
Tier 3	National Playoff winner (1 Club)↑						
Tier 4	District Leagues						

== League system ==
=== Status evolution ===
Professional leagues
Semi-professional leagues
Amateur leagues

Year	Franchise top tier	Tier 1	Tier 2	Tier 3	Tier 4	Tier 5 and below
1954 – 2003		Martyr's Memorial A-Division League	Different state cups (without top divisions)			
2003–2021		Martyr's Memorial A-Division League	Martyr's Memorial B-Division League	Martyr's Memorial C-Division League	C Division Qualifiers	Different state cups (without top divisions)
2021 –	Nepal Super League	Martyr's Memorial A-Division League	Martyr's Memorial B-Division League	Martyr's Memorial C-Division League	C Division Qualifiers	Different province leagues (without top divisions)

== Women's ==
Level	Leagues
1	ANFA Women's League
2	ANFA Women's League Qualifiers

== Youth ==
Level	Competition	Age category
Men's National	ANFA U-18 Youth League	Under-18
Men's National	ANFA U-16 Youth League	Under-16
Women's National	ANFA Junior Girl's National Football Championship	Under-17

== Cup competitions ==
=== Major cups ===
The following tournaments were sanctioned by the All Nepal Football Association for 2019.

Tournament	City	District	Province
Shahid Bhim Narayan Gold Cup	Dhankuta	Dhankuta	Koshi Province
Mai Valley Gold Cup	Ilam	Ilam	Koshi Province
Jhapa Gold Cup	Birtamod	Jhapa	Koshi Province
Damak Gold Cup	Damak	Jhapa	Koshi Province
Dhailadubba Gold Cup	Kankai	Jhapa	Koshi Province
Mechinagar Gold Cup	Mechinagar	Jhapa	Koshi Province
Birat Gold Cup	Biratnagar	Morang	Koshi Province
Falgunanda Gold Cup	Phidim	Panchthar	Koshi Province
Budha Subba Gold Cup	Dharan	Sunsari	Koshi Province
Manmohan Duhabi Gold Cup	Duhabi	Sunsari	Koshi Province
Madan Bhandari Invitational Itahari Gold Cup	Itahari	Sunsari	Koshi Province
Udayapur Gold Cup	Gaighat	Udayapur	Koshi Province
Taplejung Gold Cup	Phungling	Taplejung	Koshi Province
Simara Gold Cup	Jitpur Simara	Bara	Madhesh Province
Bishal Memorial Gold Cup	Birgunj	Parsa	Madhesh Province
Rajashree Janak Gold Cup	Lalbandi	Sarlahi	Madhesh Province
Bikash Shield Football Tournament	Bharatpur	Chitwan	Bagmati Province
Hetauda Gold Cup	Hetauda	Makawanpur	Bagmati Province
Kavre Gold Cup	Dhulikhel	Kavrepalanchok	Bagmati Province
Nuwakot Gold Cup	Bidur	Nuwakot	Bagmati Province
Sindhu Cup	Lamosangu	Sindhupalchowk	Bagmati Province
Aaha Rara Gold Cup	Pokhara	Kaski	Gandaki Province
Pokhara Cup	Pokhara	Kaski	Gandaki Province
Pokhara International Football Tournament	Pokhara	Kaski	Gandaki Province
Nepalgunj Gold Cup	Nepalgunj	Banke	Karnali Province
Tilottama Gold Cup	Butwal	Rupandehi	Karnali Province
Suduspaschim Khaptad Gold Cup	Dhangadhi	Kailali	Sudurpashchim Province

=== Other cups ===
- ANFA Cup (1980–2009)
- San Miguel Itahari Gold Cup (2007)
- Mahendra Gold Cup (1982–2004)
- Khukuri Gold Cup (1998–2004)
- Birendra Memorial Cup (2002)
- Birthday Cup* (1982–2005)
- Devi Maya Memorial Shield (1953)
- Tribhuvan Challenge Shield** (1948–1986)
- National League Cup (1985–1999)
- Ram Janaki Football Tournament
- KP Oli Cup
- Pokhara Cup

*Founded in 1974 to commemorate the 29th birthday of King Birendra Bir Bikram Shah.
**Founded in 1948 by King Tribhuvan.
