= Shree Bhagwati Club =

Nepalese football club

- Founded: 2000; 26 years ago
- Ground: Bhutkhel Football Ground, Tokha
- Capacity: 1,000
- Chairman: Indra Raj Joshi
- Manager: Sanoj Shrestha
- League: Martyr's Memorial A-Division League; Nepal National League (sometimes)
- 2025: B-Division, 2nd

Shree Bhagwati Club (SBC) is a Nepali professional football club based in Tokha, Kathmandu. Established as a community-driven initiative, the club has grown into a competitive force in Nepal's domestic football pyramid, representing the cultural and sporting spirit of the Tokha municipality.

== History ==
The club spent many years in the lower divisions, building its foundation through grassroots efforts and community support. A significant turning point occurred in June 2016, when Shree Bhagwati Club won the Martyr's Memorial C-Division League title. Under the guidance of coach Bikash Gauchan, they secured promotion to the 'B' Division, ending a six-year struggle in the third tier. Since then, the club has established itself as a powerhouse in the second tier, consistently finishing near the top of the table. In the 2024–25 (2081 BS) season, they remained unbeaten for much of the campaign, ultimately securing a place in the Martyr's Memorial A-Division League for the 2026 season.

== League finishes ==
| Champions | Runners-up | Third place | Promoted | Relegated |

The season-by-season performance of Planning Boyz United since establishment in 2012:

| Season | League | Position |
|---|---|---|
| 2008 | C-Division | 5th (Group A) |
| 2011 | C-Division | 4th (Group B) |
| 2012 | C-Division | 5th (Group A) |
| 2014 | C-Division | 3rd (Group B) |
| 2015 | League not held due to aftermath of the 2015 Nepal earthquake | |
| 2016 | C-Division | 1st |
| 2017–2018 | No league held | |
| 2019 | B-Division | 2nd |
| 2020-21 | B-Division | 6th |
| 2022 | B-Division | 5th |
| 2025 | B-Division | 2nd |
| 2026 | National | TBD |
