= Nitin Thapa =

Nepali footballer

Personal information
- Date of birth: 7 February 2002 (age 24)
- Place of birth: Nepal
- Height: 1.68 m (5 ft 6 in)
- Position: Midfielder

Team information
- Current team: Pokhara Thunders
- Number: 8

Senior career*
Years	Team	Apps	(Gls)
–2019	Sankata Kathmandu Mall		
2019	Star Sports		
2019–2021	Chyasal Youth		
2021	Pokhara Thunders		

International career^{‡}
2021–	Nepal	1	(0)
- * Club domestic league appearances and goals as of 13:28, 15 September 2021 (UTC) ‡ National team caps and goals as of 13:28, 15 September 2021 (UTC)

Nitin Thapa (born 7 February 2002) is a Nepali footballer who plays as a midfielder for Nepali club Pokhara Thunders and the Nepal national team.
