= 2013 Martyr's Memorial B-Division League =

Martyr's Memorial B-Division League
- Season: 2013
- Champions: Boys Union Club
- Promoted: Boys Union Club
- Relegated: Kathmandu Club
- Goals scored: 228
- Biggest home win: Swayambhu Club 7-1 Satdobato Youth Club
- Highest scoring: 12 goals Kathmandu Club 5-7 Satdobato Youth Club
- Highest attendance: 78

The 2013 Martyr's Memorial B-Division League was the 2013 season of the Martyr's Memorial B-Division League. A total of 13 teams competed in the league. The season started on 28 January 2013 and concluded on 5 March 2013. Boys Union Club won the league on the final matchday and were promoted to 2013–14 Martyr's Memorial A-Division League.

== Teams ==
Star Club, who participated in the 2011 Martyr's Memorial B-Division League did not participate in the league.

Team	Location	Previous season
Birgunj Youth Academy Club	Birgunj, Parsa	3rd
Boys Union Club	Kathmandu, Kathmandu	10th
Kathmandu Club	Kathmandu, Kathmandu	9th
Mahabir Club	Kathmandu, Kathmandu	11th
Swayambhu Club	Kathmandu, Kathmandu	15th (2011 A-Division League)
Samajik Youth Club	Kathmandu, Kathmandu	8th
Shree Kumari Club	Kathmandu, Kathmandu	2nd (2011C-Division League)
Tushal Youth Club	Kathmandu, Kathmandu	6th
United Club	Kathmandu, Kathmandu	17th (2011 A-Division League)
Brigade Boys Club	Lalitpur, Lalitpur	16th (2011 A-Division League)
Chyasal Youth Club	Lalitpur, Lalitpur	5th
Pulchowk Sports Club	Lalitpur, Lalitpur	4th
Satdobato Youth Club	Lalitpur, Lalitpur	1st (2011C-Division League)

== Venues ==
The league was played centrally in one venues in Kathmandu.

Nepal

Kathmandu
Halchowk Stadium
Capacity: 3,500
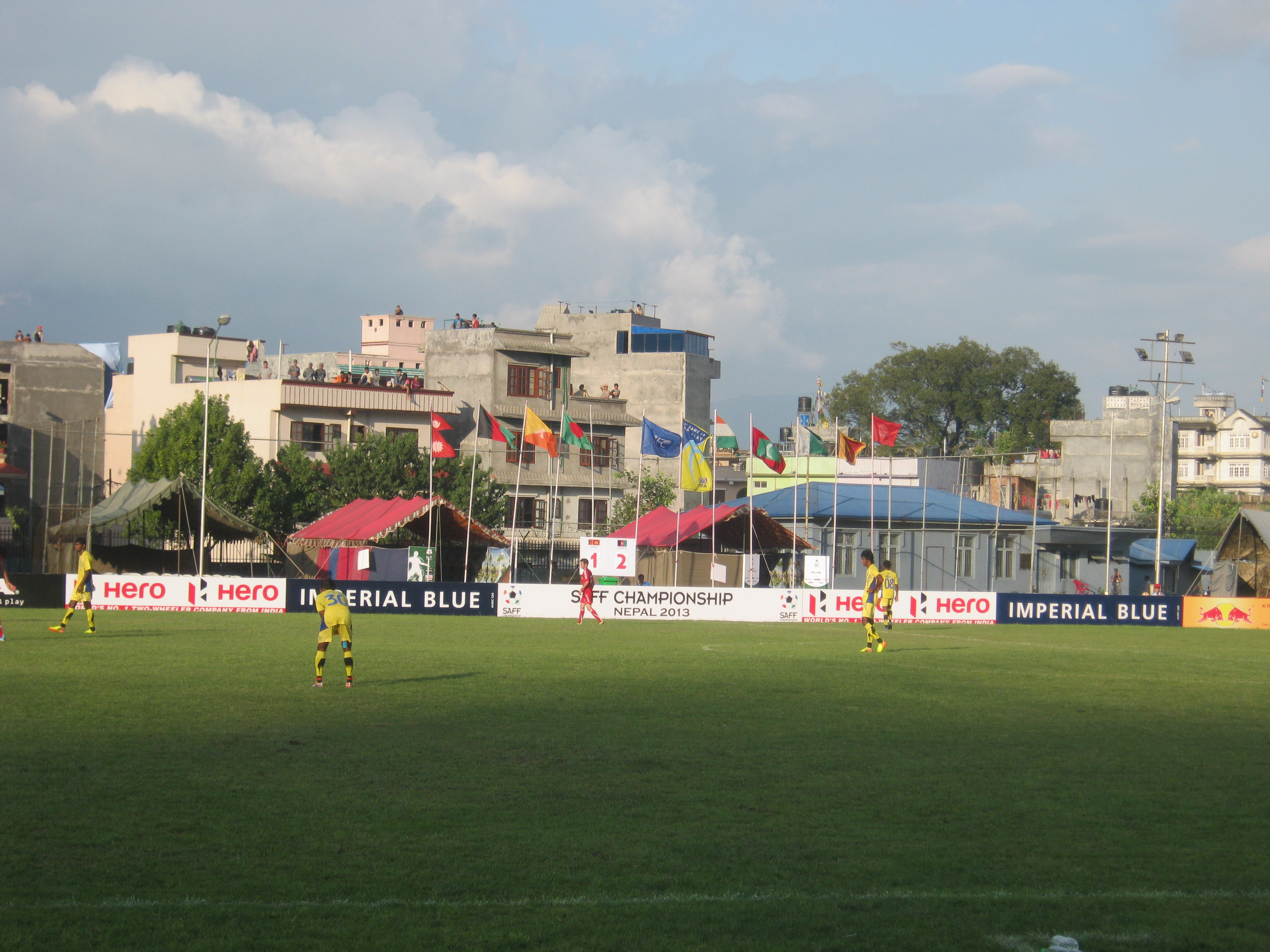

== League table ==
Pos	Team	Pld	W	D	L	GF	GA	GD	Pts	Promotion or relegation
1	Boys Union Club (C, P)	12	7	5	0	25	16	+9	26	Promotion to 2013–14 Martyr's Memorial A-Division League
2	Tushal Youth Club	12	7	4	1	23	7	+16	25	
3	Birgunj Youth Academy Club	12	6	4	2	14	8	+6	22	
4	Samajik Youth Club	12	7	1	4	17	15	+2	22	
5	Brigade Boys Club	12	6	2	4	17	10	+7	20	
6	Swayambhu Club	12	5	3	4	18	13	+5	18	
7	Shree Kumari Club	12	4	5	3	17	13	+4	17	
8	Satdobato Youth Club	12	5	2	5	18	22	−4	17	
9	United Club	12	5	1	6	18	23	−5	16	
10	Mahabir Club	12	3	4	5	17	22	−5	13	
11	Pulchowk Sports Club	12	3	1	8	18	23	−5	10	
12	Chyasal Youth Club	12	2	3	7	14	23	−9	9	
13	Kathmandu Club (R)	12	0	1	11	12	33	−21	1	Relegation to 2014 Martyr's Memorial C-Division League

Updated to match(es) played on 04 April 2014. Source:
Rules for classification: 1) points; 2) goal difference; 3) number of goals scored.
(C) Champions; (P) Promoted; (R) Relegated

== Awards ==
	Player	Club
Best Coach	(Nepal) Prem Ghimire	Boys Union Club
Best Goalkeeper	(Nepal) Raman Rasaili	Tushal Youth Club
Best Defender	(Nepal) Babu Prasad	Birgunj Youth Academy
Best Midfielder	(Nepal) Kiran Rai	Boys Union Club
Best Striker	(Nepal) Dhiraj Shrestha	Tushal Youth Club
