= FC Khumaltar =

Nepalese football club

- Full name: Football Club Khumaltar
- Founded: 2004; 21 years ago
- Ground: Dasarath Rangasala Stadium, Kathmandu
- Capacity: 15,000
- Chairman: Martin Raj
- Manager: Yam Gurung
- League: Martyr's Memorial B-Division League
- 2023: 14th of 14 (Relegated)

Football Club Khumaltar, known until 2023 as Khumaltar Youth Club, is a Nepali professional football club from the Khumaltar neighborhood of Lalitpur, Nepal. They play in the Nepalese first division, the Martyr's Memorial A-Division League. The club placed last in the 2023 edition of the League, and was relegated.

== History ==
The club was founded as Khumaltar Youth Club in 2004. They were first promoted to the Martyr's Memorial C-Division League in 2007 and to Martyr's Memorial B-Division League in 2014. Upon promotion to the top division Martyr's Memorial A-Division League, the club renamed itself FC Khumaltar and introduced a new logo. Dasarath Rangasala stadium is the club's home venue.

== Current squad ==
Note: Flags indicate national team as defined under FIFA eligibility rules; some limited exceptions apply. Players may hold more than one non-FIFA nationality.

No.	Pos.	Nation	Player
—	GK	NEP	Dev Limbu
—	GK	NEP	Chang Thebe
—	DF	NEP	Abhishek Chamlagain
—	DF	NEP	Anzal Gurung
—	DF	NEP	Padam Bhattarai
—	DF	IND	Abhishek Verma
—	MF	NEP	Shishir Lekhi
—	MF	NEP	Bishal Basnet
—	MF	NEP	Rohit Subba

No.	Pos.	Nation	Player
—	MF	GHA	Theophilus Apoh
—	MF	NEP	Jaya Gurung
—	MF	NEP	Nitin Thapa
—	FW	CMR	Stephan Binong
—	FW	NEP	Rajiv Lopchan
—	FW	NEP	Manish Thapa
—	FW	NEP	Shyam Murmur
—	FW	CMR	Messouke Oloumou
—	FW	NEP	Rejin Subba

== League finishes ==
Champions	Runners-up	Third place	Promoted	Relegated

The season-by-season performance of FC Khumaltar since 2000:

Season	League	Position
2007-2008	Martyr's Memorial C-Division League Qualifier	2nd
2011	Martyr's Memorial C-Division League	3rd
2012	Martyr's Memorial C-Division League	2nd
2014	Martyr's Memorial C-Division League	1st
2015	League not held due to aftermath of the 2015 Nepal earthquake	
2016	Martyr's Memorial B-Division League	7th
2017–18	No league held	
2019	Martyr's Memorial B-Division League	5th (Group B)
2020-21	Martyr's Memorial B-Division League	2nd
2022	Martyr's Memorial B-Division League	2nd
2023	Martyr's Memorial A-Division League	14th
2026	Martyr's Memorial B-Division League	TBD

== Under-18 ==
=== Performance record ===
Performance of FC Khumaltar U-18 in ANFA Youth Leagues
Year	Tournament	Final Position
2024	U-18 ANFA Youth League	11th

== Under-16 ==
=== Performance record ===
Performance of FC Khumaltar U-16 in ANFA Youth Leagues
Year	Tournament	Final Position
2025	U-16 ANFA Youth League	10th
