= Chyasal Stadium =

Stadium in Lalitpur, Nepal

- Interactive map of Chyasal Stadium
- Former names: Chyasal ANFA Technical Football Center
- Location: Lalitpur, Nepal
- Coordinates: 27°40′40″N 85°20′03″E
- Owner: Government of Nepal
- Capacity: 10,000
- Surface: Grass

Construction
- Built: 2002
- Renovated: 2017–2021

Tenants
- Chyasal Youth Club; Lalitpur City F.C. Three Star Club; Church Boys United; Satdobato Youth Club

Chyasal Stadium (previously known as Chyasal ANFA Technical Football Center) is a multi-purpose stadium in the Chyasal neighborhood of Lalitpur city in Nepal's Bagmati Province. It is mainly used for football matches and has a grass playing surface.

== History ==
The stadium was built in 2002 with the support of FIFA's football development project in South Asia. In 2017, the National Sports Council decided to upgrade the training grounds into a functional football stadium, with construction finishing in 2021.

The stadium was supposed to host regular matches of the Martyr's Memorial A-Division League for the 2021–22 season, but only saw its first league game after renovation during the 2023 season, where it hosted regular matches after its re-inauguration by the Prime Minister of Nepal in February 2023.
