= Johan Kalin =

Swedish football manager (born 1978)

Personal information
- Full name: Rolf Johan Kalin
- Date of birth: 1978 (age 47–48)
- Place of birth: Sweden

Managerial career
- Years: Team
- 2008–2011: Bergnäsets AIK
- 2011–2013: Notvikens IK
- 2013–2014: Machhindra F.C.
- 2019–2020: Nepal

Johan Kalin (born 1978) is a Swedish football manager who coached the Nepal national football team, after working with several teams in Sweden. Kalin is a certified coach with UEFA.

== Coaching career ==
For the 2013–14 Martyr's Memorial A-Division League, Kalin signed as the new head coach for Machhindra F.C. He led the team to finish second in the league, for which he was praised for his tactics. In 2019, All Nepal Football Association signed Kalin to be the new head coach of Nepal’s national football team for two years. His first match was a friendly against Kuwait, which ended in a 0–0 draw.

== Managerial statistics ==
As of 17 November 2020

Team	From	To	Record				
Team	From	To	G	W	D	L	Win %
Nepal	17 January 2019	1 November 2020	12	1	3	8	8.33
Total			12	1	3	8	8.33
