= 2016 Martyr's Memorial B-Division League =

Martyr's Memorial B-Division League
- Season: 2016
- Champions: Chyasal Youth Club
- Promoted: Chyasal Youth Club; New Road Team
- Relegated: Mahabir Youth Club; Samajik Y.C.
- Matches: 91
- Goals: 249 (2.74 per match)
- Top goalscorer: Suraj Raut (Khumaltar Y.C.); Bhuwan Basnet (Samajik Y.C.); 10 goals

The 2016 Martyr's Memorial B-Division League season, also known as the RedBull Martyr's Memorial B-Division League for sponsorship reasons, was the 2016 edition of the second-tier club football competition in Nepal. The season began on 21 August 2016 and concluded on 5 October 2016. It was the first B division league held since 2014 due to the April 2015 Nepal earthquake. All matches were played at Halchowk Stadium and the ANFA Complex.

== Teams ==
A total of 14 teams competed in the league, including 10 sides from the 2014 season, three relegated from the 2013-14 Martyr's Memorial A-Division League and one promoted from the 2014 Martyr's Memorial C-Division League.

=== Team changes ===
==== To B-Division ====
Promoted from 2014 Martyr's Memorial C-Division League

- Khumaltar Youth Club

Relegated from 2013–14 Martyr's Memorial A-Division League

- Boys Union Club
- Ranipokhari Corner Team

==== From B-Division ====
Relegated to 2016 Martyr's Memorial C-Division League

- Birgunj Youth Association Football Club
- Boudha Football Club
- Swoyambhu Club
- United Youth Club

Promoted to 2018–19 Martyr's Memorial A-Division League

- Brigade Boys Club

=== Overview of teams ===
Team	Location	Previous season
Bansbari Football Club	Bansbari, Kathmandu	11th
Boys Union Club	Tripureshwor, Kathmandu	13th (A-Division)
Chyasal Youth Club	Chyasal, Lalitpur	8th
Khumaltar Youth Club	Khumaltar, Lalitpur	1st (C-Division)
Madhyapur Youth Association	Thimi, Bhaktapur	2nd
Mahabir Youth Club	Kalikasthan, Kathmandu	6th
Nayabasti Youth Club	Nayabasti, Kathmandu	4th
New Road Team	New Road, Kathmandu	Relegated from 2012–13 Martyr's Memorial A-Division League due to financial reasons and did not participate in the 2014 league.
Pulchowk Sports Club	Pulchowk, Lalitpur	10th
Ranipokhari Corner Team	Ranipokhari, Kathmandu	12th (A-Division)
Samajik Youth Club	Narayantar, Kathmandu	3rd
Satdobato Youth Club	Satdobato, Lalitpur	5th
Shree Kumari Club	Balkhu, Kathmandu	9th
Tushal Youth Club	Tushal, Kathmandu	7th

== Venues ==
The league was played centrally in two venues in two cities in the Kathmandu Valley. Nepal's main football stadium, Dasharath Rangasala was unavailable, as it was not yet reconstructed following the 2015 Nepal earthquake.

Nepal

Lalitpur	Kathmandu
ANFA Complex	Halchowk Stadium
Capacity: 4,000	Capacity: 3,500

== League table ==
Pos	Team	Pld	W	D	L	GF	GA	GD	Pts	Qualification
1	Chyasal Youth Club (C, P)	13	9	1	3	22	6	+16	28	Promotion to 2018–19 Martyr's Memorial A-Division League
2	New Road Team (P)	13	8	4	1	24	9	+15	28	Promotion to 2018–19 Martyr's Memorial A-Division League
3	Ranipokhari Corner Team	13	6	6	1	16	7	+9	24	
4	Satdobato Youth Club	13	7	1	5	14	17	−3	22	
5	Shree Kumari Club	13	6	3	4	17	14	+3	21	
6	Pulchowk Sports Club	13	6	2	5	23	17	+6	20	
7	Khumaltar Youth Club	13	5	3	5	19	17	+2	18	
8	Boys Union Club	13	4	5	4	17	18	−1	17	
9	Bansbari Club	13	4	5	4	17	21	−4	17	
10	Tusal Youth Club	13	5	1	7	18	21	−3	16	
11	Madhyapur Youth Association	13	3	4	6	17	22	−5	13	
12	Nayabasti Youth Club	13	3	4	6	13	20	−7	13	
13	Samajik Youth Club (R)	13	3	2	8	21	36	−15	11	Relegation to 2019 Martyr's Memorial C-Division League
14	Mahabir Youth Club (R)	13	1	1	11	11	24	−13	4	Relegation to 2019 Martyr's Memorial C-Division League

Source: [][]
Rules for classification: 1) points; 2) goal difference; 3) head-to-head.
(C) Champions; (P) Promoted; (R) Relegated

== Awards ==
	Player	Club
Best Coach	(Nepal) Chet Narayan Shrestha	Chyasal Youth Club
Best Goalkeeper	(Nepal) Raja Babu Thapa	Chyasal Youth Club
Best Defender	(Nepal) Chetan Tharu	Chyasal Youth Club
Best Midfielder	(Nepal) Sushil Lama	New Road Team
Best Striker	(Nepal) Suraj Raut	Khumaltar Youth Club

== Controversy ==
On 27 September 2016, after losing against New Road Team, officials of Shree Kumari Club attacked and beat referee Sudesh Pandey. All Nepal Football Association sanctioned multiple of Shree Kumari Club's official, suspending the president of the club for two years.

Goal Nepal found out that the match commissioner of this game was not at the venue but in Goa, India, with a commentator calling this "disgusting". Citing security concerns, referees threatened to suspend operations after the incident.
