= APF FC =

APF football club of nepal

APF
- Full name: Nepal Armed Police Force Football Club
- Founded: 24 October 2001; 24 years ago
- Ground: Halchowk Stadium
- Capacity: 5,000
- Owner: Armed Police Force
- League: Martyr's Memorial B-Division; Nepal National League (sometimes)
- 2023: Martyrs Memorial A-Division, 12th of 14
- Website: http://www.apf.gov.np/
Home colours	Away colours

APF Football Club is a Nepali professional football club based in Kathmandu. It is the section of the Nepal A.P.F. Club.

== History ==
At its first appearance in the Martyr's Memorial A-Division League in 2005–06, the club finished in fifth position, behind MMC, Three Star, Tribhuvan Army Club and the Nepal Police Club. The club remained in fifth position in the 2006–07 season. At the end of the 2009–10 season, the APF Club barely escaped relegation, staying in the league only by defeating Machchindra FC by 8–0 in the last match.

== Record by season ==
Champions	Runners-up	Third place	Promoted	Relegated

Season	Division	Teams	Position
2005–06	A-Division	15	5th
2006–07	A-Division	14	5th
2010	A-Division	12	10th
2011	A-Division	18	12th
2012–13	A-Division	16	12th
2013–14	A-Division	13	6th
2015	National	9	5th
2018–19	A-Division	14	5th
2019–20	A-Division	14	12th
2021–22	A-Division	14	8th
2023	A-Division	14	12th

== Under-18 ==
=== Performance record ===
Year	Tournament	Final position
2024	U-18 ANFA Youth League	6th

== Under-16 ==
=== Performance record ===
Year	Tournament	Final position
2025	U-16 ANFA Youth League	Runners-up

== See also ==
- Nepal Police F.C.
- Nepal Army F.C.
