= Bikash Meraglia =

Footballer (born 2002)

Bikash Meraglia (Nepali: विकास मेराग्लिया; born 21 November 2002) is a footballer who plays as a winger or attacker for Chyasal. Born in Nepal, he was an Italy youth international.

== Early life ==
Meraglia grew up in Italy.

== Career ==
Besides Italy, Meraglia has played in Nepal.
