= Prabesh Katuwal =

Nepali soccer manager

Personal information
- Full name: Prabesh Katuwal
- Date of birth: 20 April 1986 (age 40)
- Place of birth: Nepal

Team information
- Current team: Jhapa FC (head coach)

Managerial career
- Years: Team
- 2019–2022: Machhindra F.C.
- 2022: Lalitpur City F.C.
- 2022: Nepal (caretaker)
- 2023: Machhindra F.C.
- 2023–2024: Nepal (assistant)

Prabesh Katuwal is a Nepali football coach who served as the assistant of the Nepal national football team. In November 2022, he was briefly appointed as the country's head coach.

== Coaching and managerial career ==
Katuwal was appointed head coach of Machhindra F.C. ahead of the 2019–20 season. The team won this edition of the league, and Katuwal was awarded the 'Best Coach' award. He continued to train the team for the next season winning a second title.

In 2023, during the 2023 Martyr's Memorial A-Division League, he left the team mid-season to be appointed National Coach Assistant
