= Jomoul Francois =

Trinidadian footballer

Personal information
- Full name: Jomoul Anthony Francois
- Date of birth: 4 September 1995 (age 31)
- Place of birth: Trinidad and Tobago
- Position: Midfielder

Senior career*
Years	Team	Apps	(Gls)
–2016	North East Stars		
2016	Rangers (La Horquetta)		(4)
2017	North East Stars		(3)
2018	Jabloteh		(8)
2019	Rangers (La Horquetta)		
2020	Independiente (El Salvador)	7	(0)
2021–2022	Friends Club		
2022	Druk Lhayul FC		

International career
2017–	Trinidad and Tobago	3	(0)
- * Club domestic league appearances and goals

Jomoul Anthony Francois (born 4 September 1995) is a Trinidadian professional footballer who plays as a midfielder.

== Career ==
In 2019, Francois signed for Trinidadian side Rangers (La Horquetta). Before the second half of 2019–20, he signed for Independiente (El Salvador) in El Salvador. In 2021, he signed for Nepalese club Friends Club. Francois was top scorer of the 2021–22 Martyr's Memorial A-Division League with 7 goals. In 2022, he signed for Druk Lhayul FC in Bhutan.
