= 2020–21 Martyr's Memorial B-Division League =

Martyr's Memorial B-Division League
- Season: 2020–2021
- Dates: 23 February 2020 - 11 March 2021
- Champions: Satdobato Youth Club
- Promoted: Satdobato Youth Club
- Relegated: Pulchowk Sports Club
- Matches played: 66
- Goals scored: 193 (2.92 per match)
- Top goalscorer: Sabin KC (12 Goals)
- All statistics correct as of 11 March 2021.

The 2020–21 Martyr's Memorial B-Division League was the 2020-21 season of the Martyr's Memorial B-Division League. A total of 12 teams competed in the league. The season started on 23 February and concluded on 5 March.

On 18 March 2020, the All Nepal Football Association suspended the League due to the coronavirus pandemic after matchday 5. On 23 December 2020, it was decided that the league would resume on 23 February 2021. On 7 March 2021, Satdobato Youth Club were crowned champions and were promoted to the Martyr's Memorial A-Division League.

== Teams ==
Team	Location	Previous Season
Nayabasti Youth Club	Gokarneshwar, Kathmandu	6th (Group A)
Bansbari Club	Kathmandu, Kathmandu	6th (Group B)
Ranipokhari Corner Team	Kathmandu, Kathmandu	1st
Shree Kumari Club	Kathmandu, Kathmandu	4th (Group A)
Madhyapur Youth Association	Madhyapur Thimi, Bhaktapur	4th (Group B)
Boys Union Club	Lalitpur, Lalitpur	5th (Group A)
Jhamsikhel Youth Club	Lalitpur, Lalitpur	3rd (Group A)
Khumaltar Youth Club	Lalitpur, Lalitpur	5th (Group B)
Pulchowk Sports Club	Lalitpur, Lalitpur	3rd (Group B)
Satdobato Youth Club	Lalitpur, Lalitpur	4th
Tushal Youth Club	Lalitpur, Lalitpur	3rd
Shree Bhagwati Club	Tokha, Kathmandu	2nd

=== Personnel and kits ===
Team	Head Coach	Captain	Kit Sponsor
Nayabasti Youth Club	Chet Narayan Shrestha		Gokarneshwar Municipality
Bansbari Club	Yugal Kishor Rai		Around the Himalayas
Ranipokhari Corner Team	Sulav Jung Rana		
Shree Kumari Club	Sandesh Kumar Shrestha		P. M. Construction and Engineers
Madhyapur Youth Association	Jeevan Sinkeman		
Boys Union Club			Divine Wines
Jhamsikhel Youth Club	Krishna Kumar Thapa		
Khumaltar Youth Club	Rajesh Shahi		Ruslan
Pulchowk Sports Club	Mangal Maharjan		
Satdobato Youth Club	Sanoj Shrestha		Ruslan
Tushal Youth Club	Naresh Shrestha		Boudhanath Area Development Committee
Shree Bhagwati Club	Sailesh Karmacharya		

== League table ==
Pos	Team	Pld	W	D	L	GF	GA	GD	Pts	Promotion or relegation
1	Satdobato Youth Club (C, P)	11	9	1	1	17	6	+11	28	Promotion to 2021 Martyr's Memorial A-Division League
2	Khumaltar Youth Club	11	8	1	2	27	11	+16	25	
3	Bansbari Club	11	7	1	3	21	15	+6	21 (Note: Bansbari deducted 1 point for finishing bottom of Group B in the previous season)	
4	Boys Union Club	11	5	2	4	18	13	+5	17	
5	Madhyapur Youth Association	11	5	1	5	14	18	−4	16	
6	Shree Bhagwati Club	11	4	3	4	12	13	−1	15	
7	Nayabasti Youth Club	11	5	1	5	19	20	−1	15 (Note: Nayabasti deducted 1 point for finishing bottom of Group A in the previous season)	
8	Shree Kumari Club	11	4	2	5	18	17	+1	14	
9	Ranipokhari Corner Team	11	3	4	4	14	14	0	13	
10	Tushal Youth Club	11	2	3	6	12	16	−4	9	
11	Jhamsikhel Youth Club	11	1	3	7	9	27	−18	6	
12	Pulchowk Sports Club (R)	11	1	2	8	12	23	−11	5	Relegation to Martyr's Memorial C-Division League

Source: ANFA
Rules for classification: 1) points; 2) head-to-head; 3) goal difference.
(C) Champions; (P) Promoted; (R) Relegated

== Awards ==
Award	Winner	Club
Best Goalkeeper	(Nepal) Anjal Shrestha	Khumaltar Youth Club
Best Defender	(Nepal) Shiva Gurung	Bansbari Club
Best Midfielder	(Nepal) Dinesh Rai	Satdobato Youth Club
Best Forward	(Nepal) Sabin K.C.	Khumaltar Youth Club
Best Coach	(Nepal) Sanoj Shrestha	Satdobato Youth Club

== Broadcast rights ==
All matches were streamed live on MyCujoo.
