= KTM CTY =

Nepalese sportswear company

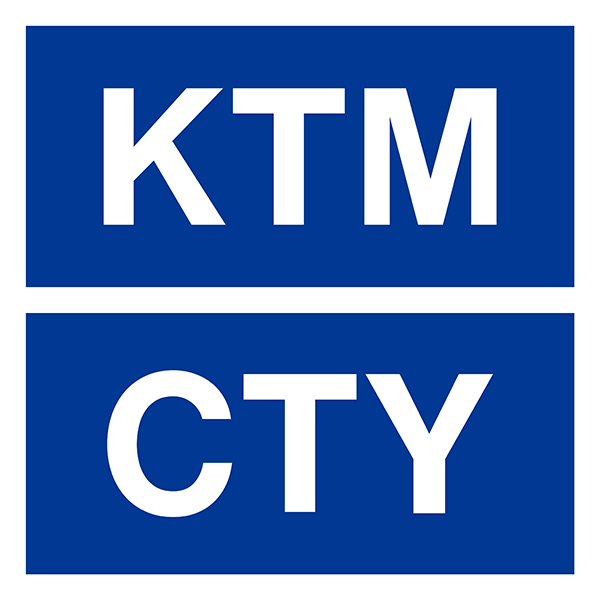
- Industry: Textile
- Founded: 2013
- Headquarters: Kathmandu, Nepal
- Area served: Nepal, India & Canada
- Key people: Mr. Nima Norbu Sherpa (CEO), Sabin Mahat (COO)
- Products: Sportswear
- Owner: Mr. Kaji Sherpa (Director)
- Website: www.ktmcty.com

KTM CTY is a Nepalese sportswear company that creates and produces apparel. It is best known for supplying the kit for the Nepalese national football team as well as supplying the official uniform for the Nepal Scouts.

== Sponsorships ==
KTM CTY provided kits to the following teams and athletes:

=== Football ===
==== National teams ====
- Nepal (Until 2024)

==== Club teams ====
- (Nepal) Butwal Lumbini F.C.
- (Nepal) Himalayan Sherpa Club
- (Nepal) Manang Marshyangdi Club

=== Cricket ===
- (Nepal) Pokhara Rhinos
