= Aashish Lama =

Nepali footballer

Personal information
- Date of birth: 1 December 1996 (age 29)
- Place of birth: Nepal
- Height: 1.67 m (5 ft 6 in)
- Position: Forward

Team information
- Current team: Butwal Lumbini
- Number: 10

Senior career*
Years	Team	Apps	(Gls)
2018–2019	Nepal A.P.F.		
2019	Manang Marshyangdi		
2019–2021	Nepal A.P.F.		
2021–	Butwal Lumbini		

International career^{‡}
2019–	Nepal	3	(0)
- * Club domestic league appearances and goals as of 14:28, 15 September 2021 (UTC) ‡ National team caps and goals as of 14:28, 15 September 2021 (UTC)

Aashish Lama (born 1 December 1996) is a Nepali footballer who plays as a forward for Nepali club Butwal Lumbini and the Nepal national team.
