= Satdobato Youth Club =

Football club

- Full name: Satdobato Youth Club
- Nickname: The White Tigers
- Founded: 1998; 28 years ago
- Ground: Chyasal Stadium
- Capacity: 10,000
- Chairman: Kapil Rana Magar
- Manager: Sanoj Shrestha
- League: Martyr's Memorial A-Division League; Nepal National League (sometimes)
- 2023: Martyrs Memorial A-Division, 5th of 14
Home colours	Away colours

Satdobato Youth Club (formally known as Satdobato FC) is a Nepalese professional football club from Satdobato, Lalitpur. In 2021, the club was first promoted to play in Nepali top flight, the Martyr's Memorial A-Division League.

== History ==
The club was founded in 1998. They were champions of the Martyr's Memorial B-Division League in 2020–21 and of Martyr's Memorial C-Division League in 2011. They play their home games at Dasarath Rangasala Stadium.

== League finishes ==
The season-by-season performance of SYC:

Champions	Runners-up	Third place	Promoted	Relegated

Season	League	Position
2007-2008	Martyr's Memorial C-Division League	3rd (Group 2)
2008-2009	Martyr's Memorial C-Division League	4th (Group B)
2010	League not held	
2011	Martyr's Memorial C-Division League	1st (promoted)
2012	League not held	
2013	Martyr's Memorial B-Division League	8th
2014	Martyr's Memorial B-Division League	5th
2016	Martyr's Memorial B-Division League	4th
2017-2018	League not held	
2019	Martyr's Memorial B-Division League	8th
2020–21	Martyr's Memorial B-Division League	1st (Promoted)
2021-22	Martyr's Memorial A-Division League	4th
2023	Martyr's Memorial A-Division League	5th

== Honours ==
=== National ===
- Martyr's Memorial B-Division League:
  - Champions: 2020–21
- Martyr's Memorial C-Division League:
  - Champions: 2011

== Under-18 ==
Performance record
Year	Tournament	Final position
2024	U-18 ANFA Youth League	12th

== Under-16 ==
Performance record
Year	Tournament	Final position
2025	U-16 ANFA Youth League	8th
