= Pistone Mutamba =

Kenyan footballer (born 1997)

Personal information
- Full name: Pistone Vunyoli Mutamba
- Date of birth: 12 November 1997 (age 28)
- Place of birth: Kenya
- Position: Forward

Senior career*
Years	Team	Apps	(Gls)
2016–2017	Wazito	27	(23)
2017–2018	Wazito	22	(15)
2018–2019	Sofapaka	20	(13)
2019–2020	Wazito	14	(8)
2021–2022	Himalayan Sherpa Club	12	(4)

International career
2018–	Kenya	7	(1)
- * Club domestic league appearances and goals

Pistone Vunyoli Mutamba (born 12 November 1997) is a Kenyan professional footballer who plays as a forward for the Kenya national team.

== International career ==
Mutamba made his debut for Kenya on 25 May 2018 against Eswatini.

== Career statistics ==
=== International ===
Statistics accurate as of match played 11 September 2018

Kenya national team
Year	Apps	Goals
2018	7	1
Total	7	1

==== International goals ====
Scores and results list Kenya's goal tally first.

No	Date	Venue	Opponent	Score	Result	Competition
1.	28 May 2018	Kenyatta Stadium, Machakos, Kenya	Equatorial Guinea	1–0	1–0	friendly
