= Mahabir Club =

- Ground: Dasarath Rangasala Stadium, Kathmandu
- Capacity: 15,000
- League: Martyr's Memorial C-Division League

Mahabir Club is a Nepalese professional football club from Kathmandu. They play at the 25,000-spectator capacity Dasarath Rangasala Stadium. The club is a three-time Martyr's Memorial A-Division League champion, having won the title of the premier season in 1955, as well as in 1967 and 1970.

In June 1970, the All Nepal Football Association organized a tournament to celebrate the 50th birth anniversary of King Mahendra, with the club participating as domestic champions. They failed to secure a single victory, losing the opening game 0–3 to eventual champions, East Pakistan football team, before tying the second-place decider with India's Border Security Force to finish joint runners-up.

== League finishes ==
The season-by-season performance of Mahabir Club since 2004:

Season	League	Position
2003/04	Martyr's Memorial B-Division League	2nd
2004	Martyr's Memorial A-Division League	12th
2005-06	Martyr's Memorial A-Division League	14th (relegated)
2007-2010	Martyr's Memorial B-Division League	League not held
2011	Martyr's Memorial B-Division League	11th
2013	Martyr's Memorial B-Division League	10th
2014	Martyr's Memorial B-Division League	6th
2016	Martyr's Memorial B-Division League	14th (relegated)
2019	Martyr's Memorial C-Division League	5th (Group B)
2021	Martyr's Memorial C-Division League	5th (Group A)
2022	Martyr's Memorial C-Division League	

== Honours ==
=== National ===
- Martyr's Memorial A-Division League:
  - Champions: 1954–55, 1966–67, 1969–70
