= Machhindra FC =

Machhindra
- Full name: Machhindra Football Club
- Nickname: The White Lions
- Short name: MFC
- Founded: 1973; 53 years ago
- Ground: Dasarath Rangasala Stadium
- Capacity: 15,000
- Chairman: Anil Shrestha
- Head coach: Prabesh Katuwal
- League: Martyr's Memorial A-Division League; Nepal National League (sometimes)
- 2023: Martyr's Memorial A-Division League, 2nd of 14
Home colours	Away colours

Machhindra Football Club (formerly known as Machhindra Bahal Club) is a Nepali professional football club based in the central Kathmandu neighborhood of Keltole, playing in the Martyr's Memorial A-Division League.

== History ==
Machhindra FC was established in 1973. For sponsorship reasons, it was named Machhindra Bahal Club in 2004, and Machhindra Energizer FC in 2006. The club was promoted to Nepal's top football division in 2004. They appointed Swede Johan Kalin in 2013, claiming to be the highest qualified coach in Nepalese football history. He led the team to a second-place finish in the league, and was praised for his tactics.

The beginning of the 2020s represented the club's most successful time with two consecutive league championships. On 5 April Machhindra appeared in the 2022 AFC Cup qualifying play-off match against Blue Star of Sri Lanka, at the Dasharath Rangasala Stadium but bowed out of the tournament by losing 2–1.

== Record by season ==
Champions	Runners-up	Third place	Promoted	Relegated

Season	League	Position	AFC Cup
2003–04	B-Division	3rd	—
2004	B-Division	2nd	—
2005–06	A-Division	13th	—
2006–07	A-Division	6th	—
2010	A-Division	6th	—
2011–12	National League	DNP	—
2012–13	A-Division	6th	—
2013–14	A-Division	2nd	—
2015	National League	Banned	—
2018–19	A-Division	13th	—
2019–20	A-Division	1st	—
2021–22	A-Division	1st	Round 1
2023	A-Division	2nd	—

== Honours ==
=== National ===
- Martyr's Memorial A-Division League
  - Champions (2): 2019–20, 2021–22
- KP Oli Cup
  - Champions (3): 2023, 2024, 2025
- Itahari Gold Cup
  - Champions (1): 2025
- Bagmati Gold Cup
  - Champions (1): 2024
- Birat Gold Cup
  - Champions (1): 2024
- Kapilvastu Tilaurakot Gold Cup
  - Champions (1): 2025

== Under-18 ==
=== Performance record ===
Performance in ANFA Youth League
Year	Tournament	Final Position
2024	U-18 ANFA Youth League	5th

== Under-16 ==
=== Performance record ===
Performance in ANFA Youth League
Year	Tournament	Final Position
2024	U-16 ANFA Youth League	Champions
2025	U-16 ANFA Youth League	6th
