= Chyasal Youth Club =

Nepalese professional football club

- Full name: Chyasal Youth Club
- Nickname(s): CYC
- Founded: 1981; 44 years ago
- Ground: Chyasal Stadium, Lalitpur
- Capacity: 10,000
- Chairman: Ramesh Byanjankar
- Manager: Bal Ghopal Sahukhala
- League: Martyr's Memorial B-Division League
- 2025: 7th of 14

Chyasal Youth Club is a Nepalese professional football club from Chyasal, Lalitpur. They play in the Martyr's Memorial B-Division League.

== History ==
The club was founded in 1981 and plays its home games at Chaysal Stadium. In 2020, the team's captain Santosh Sahukhala became the first player to score more than 100 goals in the Martyr's Memorial A-Division League.

== Squads ==
=== Current squad ===
As of 28 October 2023

Note: Flags indicate national team as defined under FIFA eligibility rules; some limited exceptions apply. Players may hold more than one non-FIFA nationality.

No.	Pos.	Nation	Player
—	GK	NEP	Arpan Karki
—	DF	NEP	Kamal Shrestha
—	DF	NEP	Biraj Maharjan (captain)
—	MF	CMR	Ketcha Wannick
—	MF	NEP	Rumesh Bartaula
—	MF	IND	Shem Marton
—	MF	NEP	Susan Lama
—	FW	CMR	Moussa Abagana
—	FW	ITA	Bikash Meraglia
—	FW	NEP	Rajeev Lopchan
—	FW	NEP	Maldina Angthumpo

=== Current Technical Squad ===
Position	Name
Technical Director	Leigh Manson

== League finishes ==
The season-by-season performance of CYC:

Champions	Runners-up	Third place	Promoted	Relegated

Season	League	Position
2007-2008	Martyr's Memorial C-Division League	3rd
2008-2009	Martyr's Memorial C-Division League	3rd
2010	League not held	
2011	Martyr's Memorial B-Division League	5th
2012	B-Division National League	6th
2013	Martyr's Memorial B-Division League	12th
2014	Martyr's Memorial B-Division League	8th
2015	League not held	
2016	Martyr's Memorial B-Division League	1st
2016-18	League not held	
2018-19	Martyr's Memorial A-Division League	8th
2019-20	Martyr's Memorial A-Division League	9th
2021-22	Martyr's Memorial A-Division League	14th
2025	Martyr's Memorial B-Division League	7th

== Honours ==
=== National ===
- Martyr's Memorial B-Division League:
  - Champions (1): 2016
