= Martyr's Memorial C-Division League =

- Organising body: ANFA
- Founded: 2003; 23 years ago
- Country: Nepal
- Confederation: AFC
- Number of clubs: 14
- Level on pyramid: 3
- Promotion to: Martyr's Memorial B-Division League
- Relegation to: C-Division Qualifiers
- Domestic cup: Local gold cups
- Current champions: Bagmati Youth Club (2024)
- Website: ANFA
- Current: 2025-26 C-Division League

Martyr's Memorial C-Division League (Nepali: शहीद स्मारक सि डिभिजन लीग) is the third tier association football league of Nepali football league system after the Martyr's Memorial A-Division League and the Martyr's Memorial B-Division League. It is run by the All Nepal Football Association.

== Structure ==
The league is the third-highest tier in domestic league football and is the lowest centrally organized league in Nepal. The winners of qualification tournaments among smaller clubs throughout the country qualify to participate in the league, while relegation results in a non-league status for the teams.

== Clubs ==
Current clubs
Club	City	Province	Previous Season
Jhamsikhel Youth Club	Lalitpur (Jhamsikhel)	Bagmati	8th
Khalibari Youth Club	Lalitpur (Thasikhel)	Bagmati	5th
Mahabir Youth Club	Kathmandu (Dillibazaar)	Bagmati	10th
Manohara United Youth Club	Kathmandu (Koteshwor)	Bagmati	11th
Nayabasti Youth Club	Gokarneshwar (Jorpati)	Bagmati	14th (B-Division) 2025
Pulchowk Sports Club	Lalitpur (Pulchowk)	Bagmati	3rd
Samajik Youth Club	Kathmandu (Koteshwor)	Bagmati	4th
Samaj Kalyan Khelkud Kendra	Kathmandu (Nayabazaar)	Bagmati	6th
Sanepa Football Club	Lalitpur (Sanepa)	Bagmati	7th
Sindhupalchok Football Club	Chautara	Bagmati	Promoted as Qualifier Runner-up
Sports Academy Sanga	Kavrepalanchok (Banepa)	Bagmati	9th
Swoyambhu Club	Kathmandu (Swoyambhu)	Bagmati	12th
Tusal Youth Club	Kathmandu (Boudha)	Bagmati	13th (B-Division) 2025
Nepalgunj 11 Sports Club	Nepalgunj	Lumbini	Promoted as Qualifier Champion

== Seasons ==
Season	Champions	Promoted	Relegated
2003	Boudha Football Club	Boudha Football Club; Tusal Youth Club; Saraswoti Youth Club; Kalika Mahabir Club	Bishnu Devi Club; Dhakre Youth Club; Shanti Youth Club; Three Star Club Young
2004	Star Club	Star Club; Pulchowk Sports Club; Bansbari Club	Sankata Club B Youth Society Club; Pako Youth Club; Bhimsen Boys Club; Yellow Star Club; King Kong Sports Club
2005	Swoyambhu Youth Club	Swayambhu Youth Club; Koilapani Polestar Club	No relegations
2006	Gyan Bhairav Club	Gyan Bhairav Club; Bansbari Club; Birgunj Youth Academy	No data
2007–08	Himalayan Sherpa Club	Himalayan Sherpa Club; Kumari Youth Club	No relegations
2008–09	Samajik Youth Club	Samajik Youth Club; Madhyapur Youth Association; Chyasal Youth Club	Varsity Sports Club; Cannon Club
2011	Satdobato Youth Club	Satdobato Youth Club; Shree Kumari Club	Garuda Sports Club; Naxal Youth Association
2012	Nayabasti Youth Club	Nayabasti Youth Club	Charumati Yuwa Pariwar
2014	Khumaltar Football Club	Khumaltar Football Club	Kathmandu Club; Boys Sports Club
2016	Shree Bhagwati Club	Shree Bhagwati Club; Jhamsikhel Youth Club	Boudha Football Club; Nava Jyoti Youth Family
2017–2018	No League held		
2019	Khalibari Youth Club	No promotions	No relegations
2020	No League held due to COVID-19 pandemic		
2021	Church Boys United	Church Boys United; Birgunj United Club; Samajik Youth Club	Sanogaucharan Youth Club
2022	Jhapa Football Club	Jhapa Football Club; Planning Boys United	Oasis Club; Birgunj Youth Academy
2024	Bagmati Youth Club	Bagmati Youth Club; RC32 Football Academy	Raniban Sports Club; Golbazar Sports Club
2025	TBD	TBD	TBD

== See also ==
- Martyr's Memorial A-Division League
- Martyr's Memorial B-Division League
