= Martyr's Memorial A-Division League =

Top division men's association football league in Nepal

- Organising body: ANFA
- Founded: 1954; 72 years ago
- Country: Nepal
- Confederation: AFC
- Number of clubs: 14
- Level on pyramid: 1
- Relegation to: Martyr's Memorial B-Division League
- International cup(s): AFC Challenge League; SAFF Club Championship
- Current champions: Church Boys United (1st title) (2023)
- Most championships: Manang Marsyangdi (8 titles)
- Top scorer: Santosh Sahukhala (104 goals)
- Broadcaster(s): Space 4K Television (YouTube)
- Website: www.the-anfa.com
- Current: 2026–27 A Division League

Martyr's Memorial A-Division League, (Nepali: शहीद स्मारक ए- डिभिजन लिग; formerly known as the Kathmandu League Championship), also known as the Qatar Airways Martyr's Memorial A-Division League for sponsorship reasons, is a professional football league in Nepal and the highest level of football in Nepal.

Administered and organized by All Nepal Football Association, it is contested by 14 teams. It operates on a system of promotion and relegation with the Martyr's Memorial B-Division League. The season usually runs from November to March with each team playing every other team twice.

A new Nepal National League was created in 2011 to give a chance to the clubs outside Kathmandu valley to compete at A level tournaments. Out of the 9 clubs competing in the National League, five are teams of Martyr's Memorial A-Division League.

The league champion for the season is granted qualification into the Asian continental club competition, the AFC Challenge League.

== Clubs ==
The following 14 teams with two teams promoted from the B-Division, will compete in the next iteration of Martyr's Memorial A-Division League.

Current clubs
Team	City	Province	Founded	Previous Season
APF FC	Kathmandu (Halchowk)	Bagmati	2001	12th
Church Boys United	Lalitpur (Balkumari)	Bagmati	2009	1st
Friends Club	Lalitpur (Kupondole)	Bagmati	1972	11th
Himalayan Sherpa Club	Kathmandu (Hattigauda)	Bagmati	2006	10th
Jawalakhel YC	Lalitpur (Jawalakhel)	Bagmati	1972	4th
Machhindra FC	Kathmandu (Jana Bahal)	Bagmati	1973	2nd
Manang Marshyangdi Club	Pokhara	Gandaki	1982	8th
Nepal Army F.C.	Kathmandu (Bhadrakali)	Bagmati	1951	7th
Nepal Police F.C.	Kathmandu (Maharajgunj)	Bagmati	1952	3rd
New Road Team	Kathmandu (New Road)	Bagmati	1934	6th
Planning Boyz United	Budhanilkantha (Kapan)	Bagmati	2012	1st (B-Division)
Sankata FC	Kathmandu (Te Bahal)	Bagmati	1950	9th
Satdobato Youth Club	Lalitpur (Satdobato)	Bagmati	1998	5th
Shree Bhagwati Club	Tokha	Bagmati	1990	2nd (B-Division)

== Champions ==
Since the start of the league, 17 clubs have won the title in 45 tournaments. Manang Marshyangdi Club have the most (8 titles) under their belt. Church Boys United are the current champions.

S.N.	Season	B.S.	Winner	Top scorer
1	1954–55	2011	Mahabir Club	
2	1955–56	2012	Police Force	
3	1956–57	2013	Police Force (2)	
4	1957–58	2014	Army XI	
1958–60		2015–16	League not held	
5	1960–61	2017	New Road Team	
6	1962–63	2019	New Road Team (2)	
7	1963–64	2020	Bidya Byama	
1964–66		2021–22	League not held	
8	1966–67	2023	Mahabir Club (2)	
9	1967–68	2024	Friends Union	
10	1968–69	2025	Deurali Club	
11	1969–70	2026	Mahabir Club (3)	
12	1970–71	2027	Deurali Club (2)	
13	1971–72	2028	Ranipokhari Corner Team	
14	1972–73	2029	Ranipokhari Corner Team (2)	
15	1973–74	2030	Ranipokhari Corner Team (3)	
16	1975	2032	Boys Union Club	
17	1976	2033	Sunakhari Athletic Club	
18	1977	2034	Annapurna Club	
19	1978	2035	New Road Team (3)	
20	1979	2036	Ranipokhari Corner Team (4)	
21	1980	2037	Sankata Boys Club	
22	1981–82	2038	Ranipokhari Corner Team (5)	
23	1982	2039	Annapurna Club (2)	
24	1983	2040	Sankata Boys Club (2)	
25	1984	2041	Ranipokhari Corner Team (6)	
26	1985	2042	Sankata Boys Club (3)	
27	1986	2042–43	Manang Marsyangdi Club	
28	1987	2043–44	Manang Marsyangdi Club (2)	
1988		2045	League not held	
29	1989	2046	Manang Marsyangdi Club (3)	
1990–1994		2047–51	League not held	
30	1995	2052	New Road Team (4)	
1996		2053	League not held	
31	1997	2054	Three Star Club	
32	1998	2055	Three Star Club (2)	
1999		2056	League not held	
33	2000	2057	Manang Marsyangdi Club (4)	(Nepal) Nirajan Rayamajhi (15 goals)
2001–02		2058–59	League not held	
34	2003–04	2060	Manang Marsyangdi Club (5)	(Nepal) Surendra Tamang (15 goals)
35	2004	2061	Three Star Club (3)	(Nepal) Basanta Thapa (20 goals)
36	2005–06	2062	Manang Marsyangdi Club (6)	(Nigeria) Junior Obagbemiro (Nepal) Rishi Rai (27 goals)
37	2006–07	2063	Mahendra Police Club (3)	(Nepal) Anil Gurung (31 goals)
2007–09		2064–66	League not held due to conflicts between ANFA and the clubs	
38	2010	2066–67	Nepal Police F.C. (4)	(Nepal) Santosh Sahukhala (19 goals)
39	2011	2068	Nepal Police F.C. (5)	(Nepal) Ju Manu Rai (21 goals)
2011–12		2068	Nepal National League was held instead	
40	2012–13	2069	Three Star Club (4)	(Nepal) Santosh Sahukhala (17 goals)
41	2013–14	2070	Manang Marsyangdi Club (7)	(Nepal) Karna Limbu (11 goals)
2014–15		2071	Nepal National League was held instead	
2015–18		2072–74	League not held due to aftermath of the 2015 Nepal earthquake	
42	2018–19	2075	Manang Marsyangdi Club (8)	(Nigeria) Afeez Olawale Oladipo (Nepal) Bharat Khawas (Nepal) Ranjit Dhimal (7 goals)
43	2019–20	2076	Machhindra Football Club	(Nepal) Aashish Lama (9 goals)
2020–21		2077	League not held due to COVID-19 pandemic	
44	2021–22	2078	Machhindra Football Club (2)	(Trinidad and Tobago) Jomoul Francois (Note: Despite Jomoul Francois and Messouke Oloumou both scoring 7 goals each, ANFA awarded the title of top goalscorer to Jamoul Francois, as he scored the goals in less time.) (Cameroon) Messouke Oloumou (7 goals)
45	2023	2079	Church Boys United	(Nigeria) Afeez Olawale Oladipo (23 goals)
2023–24		2080	League not held	
2024–25		2081	League not held	
2025–26		2082	League not held	
46	2026–27	2083	TBD	TBD

=== Championships by team ===
Club	Winners	Winning seasons
Manang Marshyangdi Club	8	1986, 1987, 1989, 2000, 2003, 2005–06, 2013–14, 2018–19
Ranipokhari Corner Team	6	1971–72, 1972–73, 1973–74, 1979, 1981–82, 1984
Nepal Police F.C. (Note: Formerly known as Mahendra Police Club. Championships for Police Force in 1955–56 and 1956–57 also included)	5	1955–56, 1956–57, 2006–07, 2010, 2011
New Road Team	4	1960–61, 1962–63, 1978, 1995
Three Star Club	4	1997, 1998, 2004, 2012–13
Mahabir Club	3	1954–55, 1966–67, 1969–70
Sankata Boys Club	3	1980, 1983, 1985
Annapurna Club	2	1977, 1982
Deurali Club	2	1968–69, 1970–71
Machhindra Football Club	2	2019–20, 2020–21
Nepal Army F.C. (Note: Championship for Army XI in 1957–58 also included)	1	1957–58
Bidya Byama	1	1963–64
Boys Union Club	1	1975
Friends Union	1	1967–68
Sunakhari Athletic Club	1	1976
Church Boys United	1	2023

== A-Division teams in Asia ==
Martyr's Memorial A-Division teams participated in the AFC President's Cup from its foundation in 2005 till its dissolution in 2014. Since 2015, the winners of the Martyr's Memorial A-Division League qualify for the AFC Cup. A-Division teams could also qualify for the Asian Club Championship before 2004.

=== AFC Challenge League ===
Season	AFC Cup	Position
2024–25	Church Boys United	Preliminary Round
2025–26	—N/a	—N/a

=== AFC Cup ===
Season	AFC Cup	Position
2015	Manang Marshyangdi Club	DNP
2019	Manang Marshyangdi Club	4th in Group Stage
2021	Nepal Army F.C.	Preliminary round 2
2022	Machhindra F.C.	Preliminary round 1
2023–24	Machhindra F.C.	Preliminary round 2

=== AFC President's Cup ===
Season	Team	Position
2005	Three Star Club	Semi-Final
2006	Manang Marshyangdi Club	3rd in Group Stage
2007	Mahendra Police Club	Runner-up
2008	Nepal Police F.C.	Semi-Final
2009	Nepal Police F.C.	4th in Group Stage
2010	New Road Team	3rd in Group Stage
2011	Nepal Police F.C.	4th in Group Stage
2013	Three Star Club	3rd in Final Stage
2014	Manang Marshyangdi Club	2nd in Final Stage

=== Asian Club Championship ===
Season	AFC Cup	Position
1985–86	New Road Team	5th in Qualifiers
1987	Manang Marshyangdi Club	4th in Qualifiers
1990–91	Ranipokhari Corner Team	3rd in Qualifiers
1996–97	New Road Team	First Round
1997–98	Mahendra Police Club	First Round
1998–99	Three Star Club	First Round

== See also ==
- Nepal Super League
- Nepal National League
- ANFA League Cup
