= ANFA National League =

- Organising body: ANFA
- Founded: 2011–12
- Country: Nepal
- Confederation: AFC
- Number of clubs: 17
- Level on pyramid: 1
- International cup: AFC Challenge League
- Current champions: Three Star Club (1st title) (2015)
- Most championships: Nepal Police Club; Three Star Club (1 title)
- Broadcaster(s): MSM
- Website: the-anfa.com
- Current: 2026 ANFA National League

The ANFA National League (formally known as Xtreme National League for sponsorship reasons), also formerly known as Nepal National League, is a club-level football competition in Nepal. The champions used to secure qualification to the AFC Challenge League (previously the AFC President's Cup and the AFC Cup). The franchise-based Nepal Super League took place for two seasons, in 2011–12 and 2015. The Martyr's Memorial A-Division League is still the highest level league in Nepal.

Due to the April 2015 Nepal earthquake, the 2015 season was halted for several months, as professional level football was paused in Nepal due to the earthquake's aftermath, until the next season of the 2018–19 Martyr's Memorial A-Division League.

== History ==
The first season of National League was played in a single round-robin format in the first season in a single venue. The top eight teams from the 2011 A-Division League were joined by two invitational teams from outside the Kathmandu Valley. A-Division champions Nepal Police Club won the league undefeated and became the inaugural National League champions.

The second season was played after a hiatus of three years in a double round-robin format with teams playing home and away. The top 10 teams from the 2013-14 A-Division League were joined by four teams from outside the Kathmandu Valley. Sankata BSC pulled out of the tournament and Machhindra, Himalayan Sherpa Club, Saraswati Youth Club and Friends Club were banned by ANFA and the league was played by nine teams. The 2015 season of the League was heavily affected by the April 2015 Nepal earthquake, with play being suspended for several months. Three Star Club won the league winning their first National League title.

The third season of the National League was scheduled to be played in April 2020 but was postponed due to the COVID-19 pandemic. The top six teams from the 2019-20 A-Division League will be joined by the top four teams from the ANFA President's League in the ten team league.

== Current clubs ==
Club	City	Province	Qualification
APF FC	Kathmandu (Hallchowk)	Bagmati	Current A Division Clubs
Church Boys United	Lalitpur (Balkumari)	Bagmati	Current A Division Clubs
Friends Club	Lalitpur (Kupondole)	Bagmati	Current A Division Clubs
Jawalakhel Youth Club	Lalitpur (Jawalakhel)	Bagmati	Current A Division Clubs
Machhindra FC	Kathmandu (Jana bahal)	Bagmati	Current A Division Clubs
Manang Marshyangdi Club	Kathmandu (Swyambhu)	Bagmati	Current A Division Clubs
Nepal Police Club	Kathmandu (Maharajgunj)	Bagmati	Current A Division Clubs
New Road Team	Kathmandu (New Road)	Bagmati	Current A Division Clubs
Planning Boyz United	Budhanilkantha (Kapan)	Bagmati	Current A Division Clubs
Sankata FC	Kathmandu (Te Bahal)	Bagmati	Current A Division Clubs
Satdobato YC	Lalitpur (Satdobato)	Bagmati	Current A Division Clubs
Shree Bhagwati Club	Tokha	Bagmati	Current A Division Clubs
Tribhuwan Army F.C.	Kathmandu (Bhadrakali)	Bagmati	Current A Division Clubs
Chitlang FC	Kathmandu	Bagmati	2nd in 2025 ANFA President League
Kakrebihar YC	Birendranagar	Karnali	4th in 2025 ANFA President League
Laligurans AFC	Pokhara	Gandaki	1st in 2025 ANFA President League
Nawa Janajagriti YC	Simara	Madhesh	3rd in 2025 ANFA President League

== Former clubs ==
Club	Location	Season(s)
Himalayan Sherpa Club	Kathmandu	2011–12
Ranipokhari Corner Team	Kathmandu	2011–12
Mitra Milan Club	Dharan, Sunsari	2011–12
Sangam Club	Pokhara, Kaski	2011–12
Far Western FC	Dhangadhi, Kailali	2015
Jhapa XI	Birtamod, Jhapa	2015
Lumbini F.C.	Butwal, Rupandehi	2015
Morang XI	Biratnagar, Morang	2015
Three Star Club	Kathmandu	2015

=== Champions ===
Season	Champions	Ref.
2011–12	Nepal Police Club	
2015	Three Star Club	
2026	Abandoned due to the ANFA-NSC crisis and FIFA suspension	

=== National League clubs in Asia ===
Season	AFC President's Cup	Position	AFC Cup	Position
2012	Nepal Police Club	3rd in Group Stage	Did not qualify	
2017	Competition disbanded		Three Star Club	1st in Qualifying Round^{[a]}

^{1} The All Nepal Football Association failed to register Three Star Club by the competition deadline for the qualifying play-offs.

== Lower levels ==
In its initial season, the Nepal National League also hosted a second division, 2012 B-Division National League made up with the 2011 Martyr's Memorial B-Division League top six, and two clubs qualified through a separate tournament.

=== Third tier ===
The 2012 C-Division National League made up with the 2011 Martyr's Memorial C-Division League top four, and two clubs qualified through a separate tournament.

== See also ==
- Martyr's Memorial A-Division League
- Nepal Super League
