= Nepal Army F.C. =

Army football club of nepal

Nepal Army
- Full name: Nepal Army Football Club
- Founded: 1951; 75 years ago
- Ground: Dasharath Rangasala Stadium
- Capacity: 15,000
- Owner: Nepalese Army
- League: Martyr's Memorial A-Division; Nepal National League (sometimes)
- 2023: Martyr's Memorial A-Division, 7th of 14
- Website: www.nepalarmy.mil.np
Home colours	Away colours

Nepal Army Football Club (formally known as Tribhuvan Army Club) is a Nepali professional football club from Kathmandu, that competes in the Martyr's Memorial A-Division League. It is the section of the Nepal Army Club. The departmental army team under the name of Army XI won four national league titles until 1958.

The club start to participat regularly in Durand Cup, India since in 2023 as a guest/invitee club.

== Records by seasons ==
Season	Division	Teams	Position	AFC Cup
2004	A-Division	13	4th	—
2005–06	A-Division	15	3rd	—
2006–07	A-Division	14	2nd	—
2010	A-Division	12	4th	—
2011	A-Division	18	8th	—
2011–12	National League	10	5th	—
2012–13	A-Division	16	3rd	—
2013–14	A-Division	13	10th	—
2015	National League	9	2nd	—
2018–19	A-Division	14	4th	—
2019–20	A-Division	14	2nd	—
2021–22	A-Division	14	2nd	Round 2
2023	A-Division	14	7th	—N/a

== Continental record ==
Season	Competition	Round	Opponent	Home	Away	Aggregate
2021	AFC Cup	Preliminary round 1	Sri Lanka Police	5–1		
2021	AFC Cup	Preliminary round 2	(India) Bengaluru	5–0		
2023	Durand Cup	Group Stage	(India) Chennaiyin	3–0		
2023	Durand Cup	Group Stage	(India) Hyderabad	3–0		
2023	Durand Cup	Group Stage	(India) Delhi FC	1–1		
2024	Durand Cup	Group Stage	(India) Shillong Lajong	1–0		
2024	Durand Cup	Group Stage	(India) Goa	2–1		
2024	Durand Cup	Group Stage	(India) Rangdajied United	2–0		
2025	Durand Cup	Group Stage	(India) Jamshedpur	3–2		
2025	Durand Cup	Group Stage	(India) 1 Ladakh	1–1		
2025	Durand Cup	Group Stage	(India) Indian Army	1–0		

== Under-18 ==
=== Performance record ===
Performance of Nepal Army FC U-18 in ANFA Youth Leagues
Year	Tournament	Final Position
2024	U-18 ANFA Youth League	10th

== Under-16 ==
=== Performance record ===
Performance of Nepal Army FC U-16 in ANFA Youth Leagues
Year	Tournament	Final Position
2025	U-16 ANFA Youth League	11th

== See also ==
- APF F.C.
- Nepal Police F.C.
