= 2018–19 Martyr's Memorial A-Division League =

Martyr's Memorial A-Division League
- Season: 2018–19
- Dates: 29 September 2018 – 8 January 2019
- Champions: Manang Marshyangdi Club
- 2019 AFC Cup: Manang Marshyangdi Club
- Matches: 91
- Goals: 226 (2.48 per match)
- Top goalscorer: Afeez Oladipo; Bharat Khawas; Ranjit Dhimal (7 goals)
- Biggest home win: Nepal Police Club 5–0 Friends Club (14 December 2018)
- Highest scoring: New Road Team 5–5 Machhindra FC (31 December 2018)
- Longest winning run: 12 matches Manang Marshyangdi Club
- Longest unbeaten run: 12 matches Manang Marshyangdi Club
- Longest winless run: 9 matches Machhindra Football Club; New Road Team
- Longest losing run: 8 matches New Road Team
- All statistics correct as of 8 January 2019.

The 2018–19 Martyr's Memorial A-Division League (Nepali: शहीद स्मारक ए डिभिजन लीग २०७५) season, also known as Pulsar Martyr's Memorial A-Division League for sponsorship reasons, was the 42nd edition of Nepal's Martyr's Memorial A-Division League since its establishment in 1954-55. A total of 16 teams competed in the league. The season began on 29 September 2018 and concluded on 8 January 2019. It was the first edition of the top-division league held in the country since the 2015 National League due to the aftermath of the April 2015 Nepal earthquake. On 16 September 2018, it was decided that there will be no relegation during this edition, though the two bottom-placed teams would have two and one points deducted, respectively, in the following season.

Manang Marshyangdi Club, the defending champions, successfully defended their title on 28 December with two games to spare.

== Teams ==
A total of 14 teams, all based in the Kathmandu Valley, contested the league. Four teams from other parts of Nepal -- Jhapa XI, Morang XI, Lumbini F.C. and Far Western F.C. -- were initially supposed to participate in the league announced for 2017. The teams had previously participated in the 2015 National League.

Six teams, that did not participate in the 2015 league, made their comebacks in the league after participating in the 2013-14 season. They were Friends Club, Himalayan Sherpa Club, Jawalakhel Youth Club, Machhindra Football Club, Sankata BSC and Saraswoti Youth Club.

As there was no season in the previous year, teams from two editions of the Martyr's Memorial B-Division League were promoted into this season.

=== Team changes ===
Promoted from 2014 B-Division League	Promoted from 2016 B-Division League	Relegated to 2016 B-Division League
Brigade Boys Club	Chyasal Youth Club; New Road Team	Ranipokhari Corner Team; Boys Union Club

=== Location ===
Team	Location	Previous Season (Note: unless denoted otherwise, this refers to the 2013-14 season)
Himalayan Sherpa Club	Kathmandu	7th
Machhindra Football Club	Kathmandu	2nd
Manang Marshyangdi Club	Kathmandu	1st
Nepal APF Club	Kathmandu	6th
Nepal Army Club	Kathmandu	10th
Nepal Police Club	Kathmandu	4th
New Road Team	Kathmandu	2nd (2016 B-Division)
Sankata BSC	Kathmandu	5th
Saraswati Youth Club	Kathmandu	9th
Brigade Boys Club	Lalitpur	1st (2014 B-Division)
Chyasal Youth Club	Lalitpur	1st (2016 B-Division)
Friends Club	Lalitpur	8th
Jawalakhel Youth Club	Lalitpur	11th
Three Star Club	Lalitpur	3rd

=== Personnel and kits ===
Team	Head Coach	Captain	Kit Sponsor
Brigade Boys Club	(Nepal) Ujjen Shrestha	(Nepal) Dilen Loktam	
Chyasal Youth Club	(Nepal) Raju Kaji Shakya	(Nepal) Devendra Tamang	Valley Construction
Friends Club	(Nepal) Ramesh Maharjan	(Nepal) Dhiraj Shrestha	Nepal Investment Bank Limited, Panchakanya Group
Himalayan Sherpa Club	(Nepal) Subas Limbu	(Nepal) Man Bahadur Tamang	Harvest Moon
Jawalakhel Youth Club	(Nepal) Raj Kumar KC	(Nepal) Ajay Thapa	Grand Master XXX Rum
Machhindra Football Club	(Nepal) Nishan Shrestha (caretaker)	(Nepal) Uttam Gurung	
Manang Marshyangdi Club	(Nigeria) Fuja Tope and (Nepal) Suman Shrestha	(Nepal) Biraj Maharjan	Signature
Nepal APF Club	(Nepal) Rajendra Tamang	(Nepal) Nabin Lama	Agni Mahindra
Nepal Army Club	(Nepal) Nabin Neupane	(Nepal) Bharat Khawas	Bajaj Pulsar
Nepal Police Club	(Nepal) Ananta Raj Thapa	(Nepal) Bhola Nath Silwal	
New Road Team	(Nepal) Maheshwor Mulmi	(Nepal) Prabin Kumar Sainju	
Sankata BSC	(Nepal) Salyan Khadgi	(Nepal) Ravi Silwal	CMG Club
Saraswati Youth Club	Pradip Nepal	(Nepal) Raj Kumar Ghising	
Three Star Club	(Nepal) Meghraj KC	(Nepal) Bikram Lama	Ruslan Vodka

=== Head coaching changes ===
Team	Outgoing coach	Manner of departure	Date of vacancy	Position in table	Incoming coach	Date of appointment
Machhindra Football Club	(Nepal) Dhaneshwor Prajapati	Mutual consent	1 December 2018	11th	(Nepal) Nishan Shrestha (caretaker)	1 December 2018

=== Foreign players ===
On 16 May 2018, the All Nepal Football Association announced that the number of foreigners for each club would be four. One of those had to be from one of the countries of the SAARC Region.

Club	Player 1	Player 2	Player 3	SAARC Player
Brigade Boys Club	(Nigeria) Kazeem Adegoke Busari	(Nigeria) Tajudeen Adukune Busari	(Nigeria) Abdu Kareem Nsiah	
Chyasal Youth Club	(Cameroon) Sergio Fils Chico	(Ivory Coast) Florent Koara		
Friends Club	(Ivory Coast) Fofana Brahiman	(Kenya) Bobby Ogolla Odongo		(Bangladesh) Mohammed Nurul Karim
Himalayan Sherpa Club	(Cameroon) Dady Junior Wamba	(Ivory Coast) Patrick Private Goha	(Cameroon) Ulrich Siewe	
Jawalakhel Youth Club	(Nigeria) Olalaken Afeez Lawal	(Guinea) Fofana Fode	(Mali) Adama Doumbia	
Machhindra Football Club	(Ivory Coast) Vassodia Diamande	(Nigeria) Alaba Ademolo Aderibigbe	(Nigeria) Saheed Obenga Anifowose	
Manang Marshyangdi Club	(Nigeria) Afeez Oladipo	(Nigeria) Oluwaunmi Somide Adelaja	(Zimbabwe) Victor Kamhuka	(India) Muhammed Asif
Nepal APF Club				
Nepal Army Club				
Nepal Police Club				
New Road Team	(Cameroon) Christian Basile Kameni	(Nigeria) Moshood Opeyemi Agboola	(Ivory Coast) Kouassi Jean Didier	
Sankata BSC	(Cameroon) Norbert Cedric Aba	(Cameroon) Maxwell Ellon	(Cameroon) Ernest Tampi	
Saraswati Youth Club	(Nigeria) Olusola Khederi Ibrahim	(Nigeria) Victor Amobi	(Nigeria) Francis Okechukwu	
Three Star Club	(Nigeria) Ajayi Martins Kayode	(Nigeria) Peter Segun	(Nigeria) Messoumbe Abang Albert	

== Venues ==
The league was played centrally in three venues in two cities in the Kathmandu Valley. Nepal's main football stadium, Dasharath Rangasala was unavailable, as it was not yet reconstructed following the April 2015 Nepal earthquake.

Nepal

Lalitpur	Kathmandu
ANFA Complex	Halchowk Stadium
Capacity: 4,000	Capacity: 3,500

== League table ==
Pos	Team	Pld	W	D	L	GF	GA	GD	Pts	Qualification
1	Manang Marshyangdi Club (C)	13	12	0	1	23	7	+16	36	Qualification for 2019 AFC Cup group stage
2	Sankata BSC	13	9	1	3	21	15	+6	28	
3	Three Star Club	13	8	2	3	22	11	+11	26	
4	Nepal Army Club	13	7	4	2	21	8	+13	25	
5	APF Club	13	7	2	4	20	14	+6	23	
6	Nepal Police Club	13	5	4	4	19	12	+7	19	
7	Himalayan Sherpa Club	13	5	2	6	15	15	0	17	
8	Chyasal Youth Club	13	4	4	5	17	15	+2	16	
9	Saraswoti Youth Club	13	4	2	7	12	20	−8	14	
10	Jawalakhel Youth Club	13	3	4	6	10	15	−5	13	
11	Friends Club	13	3	3	7	13	25	−12	12	
12	Brigade Boys Club	13	2	4	7	12	21	−9	10	
13	Machhindra FC	13	1	4	8	11	24	−13	7	
14	New Road Team	13	1	4	8	12	26	−14	7	

Source: ANFA
Rules for classification: 1) Points; 2) Goal difference; 3) Goals scored.
(C) Champions

== Positions by round ==
Team ╲ Round	1	2	3	4	5	6	7	8	9	10	11	12	13
Manang Marshyangdi Club	1	2	1	1	1	1	1	1	1	1	1	1	1
Sankata BSC	4	3	2	5	4	3	3	3	2	2	2	2	2
Three Star Club	2	1	5	4	3	2	2	2	3	3	3	3	3
Nepal Army Club	5	4	3	2	2	4	4	4	4	4	4	4	4
APF Club	7	5	8	9	11	8	8	8	8	5	7	5	5
Nepal Police Club	3	7	7	6	5	5	5	5	5	6	5	6	6
Himalayan Sherpa Club	9	6	4	3	6	6	6	7	6	8	6	7	7
Chyasal Youth Club	8	9	6	8	8	7	7	6	7	7	8	8	8
Saraswoti Youth Club	13	12	9	7	7	9	9	9	9	9	10	9	9
Jawalakhel Youth Club	12	13	13	12	10	11	11	10	10	10	9	10	10
Friends Club	11	11	14	13	9	10	10	11	12	11	11	12	11
Brigade Boys Club	14	14	10	10	12	12	12	12	11	12	13	11	12
Machhindra FC	10	8	11	11	13	13	13	13	13	13	12	13	13
New Road Team	6	10	12	14	14	14	14	14	14	14	14	14	14

Leader and qualification to AFC Cup

Source: ANFA

== Season statistics ==
As of 8 January 2019

=== Top scorers ===
Rank	Player	Club	Goals
1	(Nigeria) Afeez Oladipo	Manang Marshyangdi Club	7
1	(Nepal) Bharat Khawas	Nepal Army Club	7
1	(Nepal) Ranjit Dhimal	Three Star Club	7
2	(Nepal) Yubraj Khadka	APF Club	6
2	(Nepal) Biswash Shrestha	Himalayan Sherpa Club	6
2	(Nepal) Ranjan Bista	Three Star Club	6
3	(Nepal) Anjan Bista	Manang Marshyangdi Club	5
3	(Nepal) Amit Tamang	Sankata BSC	5

=== Clean sheets ===
Rank	Player	Club	Clean sheets
1	(Nepal) Bikesh Kuthu	Nepal Army Club	7
2	(Nepal) Bishal Shrestha	Manang Marshyangdi Club	6
2	(Nepal) Alan Neupane	Three Star Club	6
3	(Nepal) Raja Babu Thapa	Sankata BSC	5
4	(Nepal) Kishor Giri	Himalayan Sherpa Club	4
4	(Nepal) Shatrughan Chaudhary	Nepal Police Club	4
5	(Nepal) Sagar Raya	Brigade Boys Club	3
5	(Nepal) Dinesh Thapa Magar	Chyasal Youth Club	3
5	(Nepal) Dev Limbu	Friends Club	3
5	(Nepal) Takendra Thapa	Jawalakhel Youth Club	3
5	(Nepal) Deep Karki	Machhindra FC	3
5	(Nepal) Pradeep Bhandari	Saraswoti Youth Club	3
6	(Nepal) Raju Yogi	APF Club	2
7	(Nepal) Amrit Kumar Chaudhary	APF Club	1
7	(Nepal) Arpan Karki	Nepal Police Club	1
7	(Nepal) Sojit Gurung	New Road Team	1

=== Discipline ===
==== Player ====
- Most yellow cards: 5
  - (Ivory Coast) Adama Doumbia (Jawalakhel Youth Club)
  - (Nigeria) Afeez Oladipo (Manang Marshyangdi Club)
- Most red cards: 1
  - (Nepal) Ashish Gurung (Himalayan Sherpa Club)
  - (Nepal) Bishwash Shrestha (Himalayan Sherpa Club)
  - (Nepal) Bishwash Udas (APF Club)
  - (Nigeria) Francis Okechukwu (Saraswoti Youth Club)
  - (Nepal) Gaurab Budhathoki (Chyasal Youth Club)
  - (Nepal) Kuldip Karki (Jawalakhel Youth Club)
  - (Cameroon) Maxwell Ellon (Sankata BSC)
  - (India) Muhammed Asif (Manang Marshyangdi Club)
  - (Nepal) Santosh Sahukhala (Chyasal Youth Club)
  - (Nepal) Susan Lama (Saraswoti Youth Club)

==== Team ====
- Most yellow cards: 21
  - Jawalakhel Youth Club
  - Sankata BSC
- Most red cards: 2
  - Chyasal Youth Club
  - Himalayan Sherpa Club
  - Saraswati Youth Club

== Awards ==
Award	Winner	Club
Best Coach	(Nepal) Suman Shrestha	Manang Marshyangdi Club
Best Goalkeeper	(Nepal) Bishal Shrestha	Manang Marshyangdi Club
Best Defender	(Nepal) Ranjit Dhimal	Three Star Club
Best Midfielder	(Nepal) Heman Gurung	Manang Marshyangdi Club
Best Forward	(Nepal) Bharat Khawas	Nepal Army Club
Emerging Player	(Nepal) Bikash Khawas	Nepal Army Club

== Broadcast rights ==
All matches were streamed live on MyCujoo.
