= 2019–20 Martyr's Memorial A-Division League =

Martyr's Memorial A-Division League
- Season: 2019–20
- Dates: 14 December 2019 – 15 February 2020
- Champions: Machhindra FC
- Relegated: Saraswati Youth Club
- Matches: 91
- Goals: 210 (2.31 per match)
- Top goalscorer: Aashish Lama (9 goals)
- Biggest home win: Machhindra 6–1 Saraswati (6 February 2020)
- Highest scoring: Sankata 6–2 Saraswati (13 February 2020)
- Longest winning run: Machhindra (5 matches)
- Longest unbeaten run: Nepal Army Club (10 matches)
- Longest winless run: Brigade Boys Club (9 matches)
- Longest losing run: Brigade Boys Club; Nepal APF Club; Saraswati Youth Club (5 matches)
- Highest attendance: 12,451; Machhindra 1–0 Army (15 February 2020)
- Lowest attendance: 201; Army 2–1 Friends (15 December 2019)
- Total attendance: 71,921
- Average attendance: 790
- All statistics correct as of 15 February 2020.

The 2019–20 Martyr's Memorial A-Division League (Nepali: शहीद स्मारक ए डिभिजन लिग २०७६) season, also known as the Qatar Airways Martyr's Memorial A-Division League for sponsorship reasons, was the 43rd edition of Nepal's Martyr's Memorial A-Division League since its establishment in 1954-55. A total of 18 teams competed in this edition of the league, which began on 14 December 2019 and concluded on 15 February 2020.

Manang Marshyangdi Club were the defending champions.

Machhindra Football Club were crowned league winners for the first time in the club's history on the last day of the league, after defeating Nepal Army Club 1–0. However, as only one club, Tribhuvan Army Club, could secure AFC club licensing, the second-placed team qualified for the 2021 AFC Cup preliminary round 1.

== Teams ==
A total of 14 teams, all based in the Kathmandu Valley, contested the league with a relegation system. As there was no relegation in the previous season, all teams from the 2018–19 Martyr's Memorial A-Division League participated in the league.

=== Location ===
Team	Location	Previous Season
Himalayan Sherpa Club	Kathmandu	7th
Machhindra Football Club	Kathmandu	13th
Manang Marshyangdi Club	Kathmandu	1st
Nepal APF Club	Kathmandu	5th
Nepal Army Club	Kathmandu	4th
Nepal Police Club	Kathmandu	6th
New Road Team	Kathmandu	14th
Sankata BSC	Kathmandu	2nd
Saraswati Youth Club	Kathmandu	9th
Brigade Boys Club	Lalitpur	12th
Chyasal Youth Club	Lalitpur	8th
Friends Club	Lalitpur	11th
Jawalakhel YC	Lalitpur	10th
Three Star Club	Lalitpur	3rd

=== Personnel and kits ===
Team	Head Coach	Captain	Kit sponsor
Brigade Boys Club	(Nepal) Sanoj Shrestha	(Nepal) Anil Gurung	Nepal Investment Bank
Chyasal Youth Club	(Nepal) Bal Gopal Sahukhala	(Nepal) Santosh Sahukhala	Himalaya College of Engineering,^{1} Grace International^{1}
Friends Club	(Brazil) Marcus Filipe Sampaio Dantas	(Nepal) Saroj Yonjan	Nepal Investment Bank
Himalayan Sherpa Club	(Nepal) Sanjeev Budhathoki	(Nepal) Man Bahadur Tamang	Yeti Airlines
Jawalakhel YC	(Nepal) Naresh Thapa	(Nepal) Kuldeep Karki	Prabhu Bank
Machhindra Football Club	(Nepal) Prabesh Katuwal	(Nepal) Biraj Maharjan	San Miguel, Pepe Pizza
Manang Marshyangdi Club	(Nigeria) Fuja Tope	(Nepal) Kamal Shrestha	Nepal Oil Corporation
Nepal APF Club	(Nepal) Rajendra Tamang	(Nepal) Top Bahadur Bista	Agni Mahindra
Nepal Army Club	(Nepal) Nabin Neupane	(Nepal) Bharat Khawas	Bajaj Pulsar
Nepal Police Club	(Nepal) Ananta Raj Thapa	(Nepal) Bhola Nath Silwal	Nepal Telecom
New Road Team	(Nepal) Raju Kaji Shakya	(Nepal) Prakash Budhathoki	
Sankata BSC	(Nepal) Salyan Khadgi	(Nepal) Saroj Dahal	
Saraswati Youth Club	Pradeep Nepal	(Nepal) Dipesh Shrestha	
Three Star Club	(Nepal) Megh Raj KC	(Nepal) Bikram Lama	Ruslan Vodka

1. On the back of shirt.

=== Foreign players ===
The ANFA allowed a maximum of four foreign players including one from SAARC-affiliated country per team.

Club	Player 1	Player 2	Player 3	SAARC Player
Brigade Boys Club	(Nigeria) Tajudeen Busari	(Cameroon) George Vincent	(Nigeria) Isaac Olakaji	(India) Mohammad Saukat
Chyasal Youth Club	(Japan) Junichi Ozawa	(Japan) Tiaga Nakamura	(Japan) Hayato Wakino	(India) Muhammad Asif
Friends Club	(Brazil) Felipe de Almeida Souza	(Brazil) Saulo De Aquino	(Brazil) Wagner De Carmo	(India) Uttam Rai
Himalayan Sherpa Club	(Cameroon) Ulrich Siewe	(Cameroon) Stephane Samir	(Egypt) Mohamed Khairy	
Jawalakhel YC	(Cameroon) Dady Junior Wamba	(Guinea) Fode Fofana	(Mali) Adama Doumbiya	(India) Kuber Bisht
Machhindra Football Club	(Nigeria) Peter Segun	(Nigeria) Oluwaunmi Somide Adelaja	(Cameroon) Andres Nia	
Manang Marshyangdi Club	(Nigeria) Femi Adewumi	(Ivory Coast) Florent Koara	(Mozambique) Vidal Luis Chissano	(India) Dayanand Singh
Nepal APF Club				
Nepal Army Club				
Nepal Police Club				
New Road Team	(Cameroon) Andre Thierry Biyikbiyik	(Cameroon) Junior Onguene	(Cameroon) Yanick Owona	
Sankata BSC	(Cameroon) Ernest Tampi	(Nigeria) Ajayi Martins	(Cameroon) Messouke Oloumou	(India) Prahlad Roy
Saraswati Youth Club	(Cameroon) Mbei Andre Ekwem	(Tanzania) Meshack Mwankia	(Nigeria) Kazeem Busari	
Three Star Club	(Nigeria) Hamzat Wasiu	(Cameroon) Yves Priso	(Nigeria) Aliu Olas	(India) Lal Rammarva

== Venues ==
The league was played centrally in three venues in two cities in the Kathmandu Valley.

Nepal

Kathmandu		Lalitpur
Dasarath Rangasala	Halchowk Stadium^{1}	ANFA Complex
Capacity: 15,000	Capacity: 3,500	Capacity: 6,000

1. Matches were scheduled to be played at Halchowk Stadium, however, due to the bad condition of the pitch, no matches were played here.

== League table ==
Pos	Team	Pld	W	D	L	GF	GA	GD	Pts	Qualification
1	Machhindra FC (C)	13	10	2	1	25	8	+17	31 (Note: Machhindra FC was deducted 1 point for finishing 13th (second-to-last) in the previous season.)	
2	Nepal Army Club	13	9	2	2	21	7	+14	29	Qualification for 2021 AFC Cup preliminary round 1 (Note: As the Champion Machhindra FC did not meet the qualification criteria for the 2021 AFC Cup, second placed Nepal Army Club was granted the spot.)
3	Manang Marshyangdi Club	13	8	4	1	20	8	+12	28	
4	Three Star Club	13	8	2	3	18	9	+9	26	
5	Nepal Police Club	13	6	2	5	15	12	+3	20	
6	Jawalakhel YC	13	5	4	4	10	9	+1	19	
7	Sankata BSC	13	5	3	5	17	17	0	18	
8	New Road Team	13	5	2	6	14	14	0	15 (Note: New Road Team was deducted 2 points for finishing 14th (last) in the previous season)	
9	Chyasal Youth Club	13	4	3	6	13	17	−4	15	
10	Himalayan Sherpa Club	13	3	5	5	15	18	−3	14	
11	Friends Club	13	4	2	7	12	19	−7	14	
12	Nepal APF Club	13	2	3	8	15	21	−6	9	
13	Brigade Boys Club	13	2	3	8	5	15	−10	9	
14	Saraswoti Youth Club (R)	13	1	1	11	10	36	−26	4	Relegation to 2022 Martyr's Memorial B-Division League

Source: ANFA, GoalNepal
Rules for classification: 1) Points; 2) Goal difference; 3) Goals scored.
(C) Champions; (R) Relegated

== Positions by round ==
Team ╲ Round	1	2	3	4	5	6	7	8	9	10	11	12	13
Machhindra F.C.	4	5	3	2	3	1	2	2	2	2	2	2	1
Nepal Army Club	3	7	4	3	1	2	1	1	1	1	1	1	2
Manang Marshyangdi Club	2	1	1	1	2	3	3	3	3	3	3	3	3
Three Star Club	9	4	2	6	4	4	5	4	6	4	4	4	4
Nepal Police Club	7	11	8	5	6	7	6	8	5	8	6	6	5
Jawalakhel YC	8	3	5	4	5	5	8	7	7	6	5	5	6
Sankata BSC	11	8	9	11	7	8	7	6	8	7	8	9	7
New Road Team	5	10	6	8	9	6	4	5	4	5	7	7	8
Chyasal Youth Club	1	2	7	9	10	10	12	9	10	10	10	8	9
Himalayan Sherpa Club	6	9	11	12	12	13	11	12	12	12	11	11	10
Friends Club	10	13	13	13	13	12	10	10	9	9	9	10	11
Nepal APF Club	13	12	12	10	11	11	13	13	13	13	13	12	12
Brigade Boys Club	12	6	10	7	8	9	9	11	11	11	12	13	13
Saraswoti Youth Club	14	14	14	14	14	14	14	14	14	14	14	14	14

Leader
Relegation to B-Division

== Season statistics ==
As of 15 February 2020

=== Scoring ===
==== Top Scorers ====
Rank	Player	Club	Goals
1	(Nepal) Aashish Lama	Nepal APF Club	9
2	(Nepal) Santosh Sahukhala	Chyasal Youth Club	7
3	(Nepal) Anjan Bista	Manang Marshyangdi Club	6
3	(Nepal) Bimal Rana	Manang Marshyangdi Club	6
3	(Nepal) Nawayug Shrestha	Nepal Army Club	6
3	(Nigeria) Kazeem Adegoke Busari	Saraswati Youth Club	6
6	(Nepal) Bijay Shrestha	Himalayan Sherpa Club	5

==== Hat-tricks ====
Player	For	Against	Result	Date
(Nepal) Sanjog Rai	Three Star Club	Saraswati Youth Club	4–0	1 February 2020
(Nepal) Ju Manu Rai	Nepal Police Club	Friends Club	3–0	13 February 2020

=== Clean sheets ===
Rank	Player	Club	Clean sheets
1	(Nepal) Deep Karki	Manang Marshyangdi Club	8
2	(Nepal) Bikesh Kuthu	Nepal Army Club	7
2	(Nepal) Bishal Shrestha	Machhindra FC	7
2	(Cameroon) Yves Priso	Three Star Club	7
5	(Nepal) Tekendra Thapa	Jawalakhel YC	5
5	(Nepal) Ajit Prajapati	New Road Team	5
7	(Nepal) Alan Neupane	Chyasal Youth Club	4
7	(Nepal) Arun Blon	Jawalakhel YC	4
7	(Nepal) Binaya Shrestha	Sankata BSC	4
7	(Nepal) Bishal Sunar	Brigade Boys Club	4
7	(Nepal) Dev Limbu	Friends Club	4
7	(Nepal) Kishor Giri	Himalayan Sherpa Club	4
13	(Nepal) Roshan Khadka	Nepal Police Club	3
13	(Nepal) Shatrudhan Chaudhary	Nepal Police Club	
15	(Nepal) Amrit Kumar Chaudhary	Nepal APF Club	1
15	(Nepal) Pradeep Bhandari	Saraswati Youth Club	1

=== Discipline ===
==== Player ====
- Most yellow cards: 4
  - (Mali) Adama Doumbia (Jawalakhel Youth Club)
  - Hem Tamang (Nepal Police Club)
  - Prabesh Kunwar (Nepal Police Club)
  - (Cameroon) Stepahne Samir (Himalayan Sherpa Club)
- Most red cards: 2
  - (Nepal) Niraj Basnet (Himalayan Sherpa Club)

==== Team ====
- Most yellow cards: 27
  - Chyasal Youth Club
- Most red cards: 3
  - Manang Marshyangdi Club

== Awards ==
=== End-of-season awards ===
Award	Winner	Club
Goalkeeper	Deep Karki	Manang Marshyangdi Club
Defender	Ananta Tamang	Three Star Club
Midfielder	Bishal Rai	Machhindra FC
Forward	Bharat Khawas	Nepal Army Club
Head Coach	Prabesh Katuwal	Machhindra FC
Mani Bikram Shah Youth Player	Darshan Gurung	New Road Team
Fair Play	Three Star Club	
