= 2013–14 Martyr's Memorial A-Division League =

Martyr's Memorial A-Division League
- Season: 2013–14
- Champions: Manang Marshyangdi Club (7th title)
- Relegated: RCT; Boys Union Club
- AFC President's Cup: Manang Marshyangdi Club
- Matches: 87
- Goals: 224 (2.57 per match)
- Top goalscorer: Karna Limbu (11 goals)
- Biggest home win: Nepal Police Club 9-0 Boys Union Club
- Highest scoring: 9 goals Nepal Police Club 9-0 Boys Union Club

The 2013–14 Martyr's Memorial A-Division League season (Nepali: 2013-14 शहीद स्मारक ए डिभिजन लीग), also known as the Martyrs' Memorial Red Bull 'A' Division League Football Tournament 2013–14 for sponsorship reasons, was the 41st edition of Nepal's Martyr's Memorial A-Division League since its establishment in 1954/55. A total of 13 teams competed in the league. The season began on 30 December 2013 and concluded on 1 March 2014.

Three Star Club were the defending champions. Manang Marshyangdi Club won the title for a record seventh time.

== Teams ==
Of the 13 participating teams, twelve remained following the 2012–13 Martyr's Memorial A-Division League. They were joined by one team, Boys Union Club, promoted from the 2013 Martyr's Memorial B-Division League. Madhyapur Youth Association, Bansbari Football Club and Boudha Football Club were relegated to the 2014 Martyr's Memorial B-Division League.

New Road Team had to withdraw from the competition due to financial reasons and was relegated to the Martyr's Memorial B-Division League.

Team	Location	Previous Season
APF Club	Kathmandu	12th
Boys Union Club	Kathmandu	1st (2013 B-Division)
Himalayan Sherpa Club	Kathmandu	10th
Machhindra Football Club	Kathmandu	6th
Manang Marshyangdi Club	Kathmandu	2nd
Nepal Army Club	Kathmandu	3rd
Nepal Police Club	Kathmandu	7th
Ranipokhari Corner Team	Kathmandu	8th
Sankata Club	Kathmandu	11th
Saraswoti Youth Club	Kathmandu	9th
Friends Club	Lalitpur	4th
Jawalakhel Youth Club	Lalitpur	13th
Three Star Club	Lalitpur	1st

== League table ==
Pos	Team	Pld	W	D	L	GF	GA	GD	Pts	Qualification or relegation
1	Manang Marshyangdi Club	12	8	2	2	23	5	+18	26	Qualification for Super League
2	Three Star Club	12	7	3	2	19	11	+8	24	Qualification for Super League
3	Nepal Police Club	12	6	4	2	22	8	+14	22	Qualification for Super League
4	Sankata Club	12	6	4	2	15	6	+9	22	Qualification for Super League
5	Machhindra Football Club	12	5	4	3	16	10	+6	19	Qualification for Super League
6	APF Club	12	5	3	4	17	19	−2	18	Qualification for Super League
7	Himalayan Sherpa Club	12	4	4	4	16	16	0	16	
8	Friends Club	12	4	3	5	13	14	−1	15	
9	Saraswoti Youth Club	12	4	3	5	9	13	−4	15	
10	Nepal Army Club	12	2	7	3	12	11	+1	13	
11	Jawalakhel Youth Club	12	4	1	7	9	20	−11	13	
12	Ranipokhari Corner Team (R)	12	2	1	9	10	24	−14	4 (Note: Ranipokhari Corner Team were deducted 3 points for not participating in the 2013 Ncell Cup.)	Relegation to 2016 Martyr's Memorial B-Division League
13	Boys Union Club (R)	12	1	1	10	8	32	−24	4	Relegation to 2016 Martyr's Memorial B-Division League

Updated to match(es) played on 1 March 2013. Source:
Rules for classification: 1) points; 2) goal difference; 3) number of goals scored.
(R) Relegated

== Super League ==
The points from the first round were added to the table for the Super League.

Pos	Team	Pld	W	D	L	GF	GA	GD	Pts	Qualification
1	Manang Marshyangdi Club (C)	17	11	2	4	31	13	+18	35	2014 AFC President's Cup
2	Machhindra Football Club	17	10	4	3	26	12	+14	34	
3	Three Star Club	17	9	5	3	24	15	+9	32	
4	Nepal Police Club	17	7	5	5	25	14	+11	26	
5	Sankata Club	17	6	6	5	17	13	+4	24	
6	APF Club	17	6	4	7	24	27	−3	22	

Updated to match(es) played on 1 March 2013. Source:
Rules for classification: 1) points; 2) goal difference; 3) number of goals scored.
(C) Champions

== Top scorers ==
Accurate as of July 2014.

Rank	Player	Club	Goals	Penalties
1	(Nepal) Karna Limbu	Machhindra Football Club	11	1
2	(Nepal) Santosh Sahukhala	Three Star Club	9	2
3	(Tanzania) Yona Elias	Manang Marshyangdi Club	9	0
4	(Nepal) Anil Gurung	Manang Marshyangdi Club	7	2
5	(Nepal) Bhola Silwal	Nepal Police Club	7	1
6	(Nepal) Dipak Rai	Manang Marshyangdi Club	7	0
7	(Nigeria) Afeez Oladipo	Sankata Club	6	0
7	(Nepal) Bharat Shah	Nepal Police Club	6	0
7	(Tanzania) Pius Henry	Saraswoti Youth Club	6	0
7	(Nigeria) Segun Akinade	Himalayan Sherpa Club	6	0
8	(Nepal) Jumanu Rai	Nepal Police Club	5	1
9	(Nepal) Ganesh Lawati	Nepal Armed Police Force	5	0
9	(Ivory Coast) Leonce Dodoz	Three Star Club	5	0
9	(Nigeria) Martins Kayode	Friends Club	5	0
9	(Nepal) Rajendra Rawal	Nepal Armed Police Force	5	0

== Awards ==
	Player	Club
Best Coach	(Nepal) Hari Om Shrestha	Manang Marshyangdi Club
Best Goalkeeper	(Nepal) Bishal Shrestha	Manang Marshyangdi Club
Best Defender	(Nepal) Hem Gurung	Machhindra Football Club
Best Midfielder	(Nepal) Sushil KC	Machhindra Football Club
Best Striker	(Nepal) Karna Limbu	Machhindra Football Club
