= 2025 Martyr's Memorial B-Division League =

Martyr's Memorial B-Division League
- Season: 2025–26
- Dates: 9 March – 23 May 2025
- Champions: Planning Boyz United
- Promoted: Planning Boyz United; Shree Bhagwati Club
- Relegated: Tushal Youth Club; Nayabasti Youth Club
- Matches: 91
- Goals: 241 (2.65 per match)
- Top goalscorer: (Nepal) Fagu Ram Tharu (14 goals)
- Highest scoring: Planning Boyz United 8–3 Tusal Youth Club (23 May 2025)
- All statistics correct as of 23 May 2025.

The 2025 Martyr's Memorial B-Division League season is the 2025 (2081 BS) edition of the Martyr's Memorial B-Division League. The tournament started on 9 March 2025. After a three-year hiatus, in the last edition held in 2022, Church Boys United emerged victorious, earning a promotion to the 2023 A Division.

== Team changes ==
Entering league		Exiting league	
Promoted from 2022 C-Division ▲	Relegated from 2021–22 A-Division ▼	Promoted to 2025-26 A-Division▲	Relegated to 2025 C-Division▼
Jhapa Football Club; Planning Boyz United	Brigade Boys; Chyasal Youth Club	Planning Boyz United; Shree Bhagwati Club	Tushal Youth Club; Nayabasti Youth Club

== Clubs ==
A total of 14 teams in the regular season will contest the league with a relegation system. Ten teams from the 2022 season, two teams relegated from the 2021–22 A Division leagues, and two teams promoted from the 2022 C-Division Leagues will participate in the league.

Team	Location	Province	Previous Season
Annapurna Club RCT	Kathmandu (New Road)	Bagmati	3rd
Bansbari Club	Kathmandu (Maharajgunj)	Bagmati	4th
Birgunj United	Parsa (Birgunj)	Madhesh	9th
Boys Union	Kathmandu (Tripureshwar)	Bagmati	8th
Brigade Boys	Lalitpur (Manbhawan)	Bagmati	13th (A-Division) 2021–22
Chyasal Youth Club	Lalitpur (Chyasal)	Bagmati	14th (A-Division) 2021–22
Jhapa Football Club	Jhapa (Damak)	Koshi	1st (C-Division) 2022
Madhyapur Youth Association	Bhaktapur (Madhyapur Thimi)	Bagmati	7th
Nayabasti Youth Club	Gokarneshwar (Jorpati)	Bagmati	12th
Planning Boyz United	Budhanilkantha (Kapan)	Bagmati	2nd (C-Division) 2022
Saraswati Youth Club	Kathmandu (Koteshwor)	Bagmati	6th
Shree Bhagwati	Kathmandu (Tokha)	Bagmati	5th
Shree Kumari	Kathmandu (Balkhu)	Bagmati	10th
Tusal Youth Club	Kathmandu (Boudha)	Bagmati	11th

=== Personnel and sponsorship ===
Team	Head Coach	Captain	Kit manufacturer	Shirt sponsor	Team manager
Annapurna RCT	(Nepal) Sanoj Shrestha	(Nepal) Akash Ranabhat	(Germany) Adidas		
Bansbari Club	(Nepal) Niran Bista	(Nepal) Kamal Khawas	(Spain) Kelme	IGI Prudential Insurance	
Birgunj United	(Nepal) Sulav Jung Rana	(Nepal) Bibek Chaudhary		WINgel	
Boys Union	(Nepal) Chandra Bhandari	(Nepal) Man Kumar Tamang		Kuber Trust	(Nepal) Sujak Regmi
Brigade Boys	(Nepal) Dhaneshwor Prajapati	(Nepal) Subit Karki		Matrika Eye Center	
Chyasal Youth Club	(Nepal) Dipesh Yonjan	(Nepal) Kushal Deuba	(India) Nivia		
Jhapa Football Club		(Nepal) Pema Tamang	(Nepal) Anee		
Madhyapur Youth Association	(Nepal) Shree Prakash Baidhya	(Nepal) Yaman Rajbahak	(China) Li-Ning	BIZZ Education	
Nayabasti Youth Club	(Nepal) Chet Narayan Shrestha	(Nepal) Pasang Lama	(Spain) Kelme	Gokarneshwor Municipality	
Planning Boyz United	(Nepal) Sashindra Dhimal	(Nepal) Bishal Darji	(Spain) Kelme	Kathmandu World School	
Saraswati Youth Club	(Nepal) Bal Gopal Sahukhala	(Nepal) Shakti Rai		BBR Construction	
Shree Bhagwati Club	(Nepal) Mahesh Shrestha	(Nepal) Urken Jangbu Sherpa		Tokha Municipality	
Shree Kumari Club		(Nepal) Yagya Pradhan			
Tushal Youth Club		(Nepal) Abhishek Shrestha		KMC Ward No. 6	

== Venues ==
The league was played centrally in one venue in Lalitpur. For the final matchday, selected matches were played at Dasharath Rangasala.

Nepal

Kathmandu	Lalitpur
Dasharath Rangasala	ANFA Complex
Capacity: 15,000	Capacity: 6,000

== League table ==
Pos	Team	Pld	W	D	L	GF	GA	GD	Pts	Qualification
1	Planning Boyz United (C, P)	13	10	3	0	32	7	+25	33	Promotion to Martyr's Memorial A-Division League
2	Shree Bhagwati Club (P)	13	7	5	1	22	10	+12	26	Promotion to Martyr's Memorial A-Division League
3	Boys Union Club	13	6	4	3	24	19	+5	22	
4	Birgunj United	13	5	5	3	17	13	+4	20	
5	Jhapa Football Club	13	5	3	5	15	13	+2	18	
6	Annapurna Club RCT	13	5	3	5	21	21	0	18	
7	Chyasal Youth Club	13	5	3	5	18	18	0	18	
8	Madhyapur Youth Association	13	5	3	5	13	14	−1	18	
9	Saraswoti Youth Club	13	6	0	7	17	19	−2	18	
10	Shree Kumari Club	13	5	1	7	16	22	−6	16	
11	Brigade Boys Club	13	4	3	6	15	18	−3	15	
12	Bansbari Club	13	5	0	8	14	17	−3	15	
13	Tushal Youth Club (R)	13	2	5	6	13	24	−11	11	Relegation to 2025 Martyr's Memorial C-Division League
14	Nayabasti Youth Club (R)	13	1	2	10	7	29	−22	5	Relegation to 2025 Martyr's Memorial C-Division League

Updated to match(es) played on 23 May 2025. Source: Martyr's Memorial B-Division League
Rules for classification: 1) Points; 2) head-to-head; 3) Goal difference; 4) Goals scored.
(C) Champions; (P) Promoted; (R) Relegated

== Results ==
Home \ Away	PBU	SBC	BUC	BIU	JFC	RCT	CYC	MYA	SYC	SKC	BBC	BAC	TYC	NYC
Planning Boyz United		1–1	2–1	1–0	2–1	1–0	4–0	2–0	3–0	1–1	0–0	2–0	8–3	5–0
Shree Bhagwati Club	1–1		2–1	1–1	2–0	3–1	0–0	1–1	2–3	2–0	2–0	1–0	2–2	3–0
Boys Union Club	1–2	1–2		3–3	1–1	1–0	1–2	2–0	2–1	5–3	3–2	4–3	0–0	0–0
Birgunj United	0–1	1–1	3–3		0–0	1–1	0–0	1–0	0–3	2–0	3–1	2–1	4–1	0–1
Jhapa Football Club	1–2	0–2	1–1	0–0		2–1	0–2	1–2	2–0	0–1	1–1	2–0	2–0	3–1
Annapurna Club RCT	0–1	1–3	0–1	1–1	1–2		3–2	0–0	4–3	4–1	2–1	2–4	1–1	2–1
Chyasal Youth Club	0–4	0–0	2–1	0–0	2–0	2–3		4–0	0–1	2–1	1–4	0–1	1–1	4–2
Madhyapur Youth Association	0–2	1–1	0–2	0–1	2–1	0–0	0–4		1–0	3–1	0–1	1–0	1–1	4–0
Saraswoti Youth Club	0–3	3–2	1–2	3–0	0–2	3–4	1–0	0–1		0–2	3–1	2–1	0–1	1–0
Shree Kumari Club	1–1	0–2	3–5	0–2	1–0	1–4	1–2	1–3	2–0		1–2	1–0	2–1	2–0
Brigade Boys Club	0–0	0–2	2–3	1–3	1–1	1–2	4–1	1–0	1–3	2–1		0–1	1–0	1–1
Bansbari Club	0–2	0–1	3–4	1–2	0–2	4–2	1–0	0–1	1–2	0–1	1–0		1–0	2–0
Tushal Youth Club	3–8	2–2	0–0	1–4	0–2	1–1	1–1	1–1	1–0	1–2	0–1	0–1		2–1
Nayabasti Youth Club	0–5	0–3	0–0	1–0	1–3	1–2	0–2	0–4	0–1	0–2	1–1	2–4	1–2	

Source: Martyr's Memorial B-Division League
Legend: Blue = home team win; Yellow = draw; Red = away team win.

=== Results by games ===
Team ╲ Round	1	2	3	4	5	6	7	8	9	10	11	12	13
Bansbari Club	L	W	W	L	L	L	W	W	W	L	L	L	L
Brigade Boys Club	W	L	L	D	W	D	D	W	L	L	L	W	L
Birgunj United	D	W	D	W	L	W	D	L	W	D	L	D	W
Boys Union Club	D	D	D	L	W	L	W	W	W	D	W	L	W
Chyasal Youth Club	D	L	W	W	D	W	L	L	W	L	D	L	W
Jhapa Football Club	L	L	D	W	W	D	D	L	L	W	W	W	L
Madhyapur Youth Association	D	W	L	L	L	W	D	L	L	W	D	W	W
Nayabasti Youth Club	D	L	L	D	W	L	L	L	L	L	L	L	L
Planning Boyz United	W	W	W	W	W	W	D	W	D	D	W	W	W
Annapurna RCT Club	L	L	W	D	L	L	D	L	W	W	W	D	W
Shree Bhagwati Club	W	W	D	W	D	W	W	D	W	D	D	W	L
Shree Kumari Club	L	L	L	L	W	W	W	W	D	L	L	W	L
Saraswoti Youth Club	W	W	L	L	L	L	L	W	L	W	W	L	W
Tushal Youth Club	D	D	W	D	L	L	L	D	L	W	D	L	L

Updated to match(es) played on 23 May 2025. Source: Martyr's Memorial B-Division League
W = Win; D = Draw; L = Lose

=== Positions by round ===
Team ╲ Round	1	2	3	4	5	6	7	8	9	10	11	12	13
Bansbari Club	11	6	3	5	8	9	7	4	4	5	7	8	11
Birgunj United	5	4	5	3	3	3	3	3	3	3	4	5	4
Boys Union Club	6	9	9	12	7	8	5	5	5	4	3	3	3
Brigade Boys Club	2	7	10	9	6	6	8	6	8	9	11	7	12
Chyasal Youth Club	7	11	8	4	4	4	4	8	6	6	6	9	8
Jhapa Football Club	12	12	12	8	5	5	6	9	9	8	5	4	5
Madhyapur Youth Association	9	5	7	11	13	7	10	11	12	11	12	12	9
Nayabasti Youth Club	8	10	13	13	11	13	14	10	11	14	14	14	14
Planning Boyz United	3	1	1	1	1	1	1	1	1	1	1	1	1
Annapurna RCT Club	14	14	11	10	12	14	13	14	10	10	9	11	7
Shree Bhagwati Club	1	2	2	2	2	2	2	2	2	2	2	2	2
Shree Kumari Club	13	13	14	14	14	10	9	7	7	7	10	6	10
Saraswoti Youth Club	4	3	4	7	10	12	12	13	14	13	8	10	6
Tushal Youth Club	10	8	6	6	9	11	11	12	13	12	13	13	13

Champion
Promoted
Relegation to C-Division

Updated to match(es) played on 23 April 2025. Source: Martyr's Memorial B-Division League

== Season statistics ==
As of 2025 May 23

=== Scorers ===
There have been 241 goals scored in 91 matches, for an average of 2.65 goals per match (as of 23 May 2025).

Rank	Player	Club	Goals
1	(Nepal) Fagu Ram Tharu	Planning Boyz United	14
2	(Nepal) Sandip Limbu	Bansbari Club	7
2	(Nepal) Bikrant Narsingh Rana	Shree Bhagwati Club	7
3	(Nepal) Yaman Maharjan	Shree Kumari Club	6
4	(Nepal) Divyaram Chaudhary	Boys Union Club	5
4	(Nepal) Prajwal Gurung	Annapurna Club RCT	5
4	(Nepal) Aashish Tharu	Chyasal Youth Club	5
4	(Nepal) Ajit Gurung	Annapurna Club RCT	5
5	(Nepal) Bikey Rai	Bansbari Club	4
5	(Nepal) Ashish Gurung	Brigade Boys Club	4
5	(Nepal) Bisheh Lama	Saraswoti Youth Club	4
5	(Nepal) Pradip Budathoki	Jhapa Football Club	4
5	(Nepal) Mukunda Kumar Niure	Brigade Boys Club	4
5	(Nepal) Sanjeev Lama	Boys Union Club	4
5	(Nepal) Pratap Sing Rai	Planning Boyz United	4
6	(Nepal) Sujan Dangol	Planning Boyz United	3
6	(Nepal) Pujan Rai	Jhapa Football Club	3
6	(Nepal) Niraj Karki	Chayasal Youth Club	3
6	(Nepal) Dorje Tamang	Boys Union Club	3
6	(Nepal) Ujwal Rai	Shree Bagawati Club	3
6	(Nepal) Nikhil Tamang	Annapurna Club RCT	3
6	(Nepal) Rajesh Dahal	Jhapa Football Club	3
6	(Nepal) Dhirendra Bahadur Shah	Saraswoti Youth Club	3
6	(Nepal) Sujit Budathoki	Boys Union Club	3
6	(Nepal) Bigyan Khadka	Madhyapur Youth Association	3
6	(Nepal) Sahil KC	Madhyapur Youth Association	3
6	(Nepal) Roman Shrestha	Brigade Boys Club	3
6	(Nepal) Kripakanta Mahato Tharu	Birgunj United	3
6	(Nepal) Amar Dangol	Birgunj United	3
6	(Nepal) Sujan Majhi	Tusal Youth Club	3
6	(Nepal) Binod Nembang	Tusal Youth Club	3
6	(Nepal) Naresh Kumar Khatri	Saraswoti Youth Club	3
7	(Nepal) Sudip Lama	Annapurna Club RCT	2
7	(Nepal) Bijay Uranaw	Brigade Boys Club	2
7	(Nepal) Suleman Thapa Magar	Shree Bhagwati Club	2
7	(Nepal) Bikash Das Tharu	Birgunj United	2
7	(Nepal) Bibek Chaudhary	Birgunj United	2
7	(Nepal) Saroj Darlami	Bansbari Club	2
7	(Nepal) Amit Lama	Shree Bhagwati Club	2
7	(Nepal) Binod Dhamala	Shree Kumari Club	2
7	(Nepal) Kushal Deuba	Chayasal Youth Club	2
7	(Nepal) Purna Bahadur Gurung	Nayabasti Youth Club	2
7	(Nepal) Milan Limbu	Boys Union Club	2
7	(Nepal) Ashwin Ghorasainee	Chayasal Youth Club	2
7	(Nepal) Shree Krishna Tamang	Nayabasti Youth Club	2
7	(Nepal) Dipesh Limbu	Tusal Youth Club	2
7	(Nepal) Amit Bachhar	Birgunj United	2
7	(Nepal) Santosh Gongba	Madhyapur Youth Association	2
7	(Nepal) Nishant Pradan	Shree Kumari Club	2
7	(Nepal) Anil Bomjan	Chayasal Youth Club	2
7	(Nepal) Abhishek Rana Magar	Brigade Boys Club	2
7	(Nepal) Binod Rai	Boys Union Club	2
7	(Nepal) Ajit Lama	Shree Bhagwati Club	2
7	(Nepal) Bibek Rai	Annapurna Club RCT	2
7	(Nepal) Om Prakash Chaudahry	Planning Boyz United	2
7	(Nepal) Pradip Sunar	Tusal Youth Club	2
7	(Nepal) Sabin Lungeli Magar	Saraswoti Youth Club	2
8	(Nepal) Abinash Thapa	Planning Boyz United	1
8	(Nepal) Saroj Karki Doli	Planning Boyz United	1
8	(Nepal) Bishal Darji	Planning Boyz United	1
8	(Nepal) Sangamkhanda Thakuri	Bansbari Club	1
8	(Nepal) Pranaya Gurung	Shree Kumari Club	1
8	(Nepal) Bishal Bikram Silwal	Shree Bhagwati Club	1
8	(Nepal) Bipin Tumsing Magar	Birgunj United	1
8	(Nepal) Dipesh Shrestha	Shree Bhagwati Club	1
8	(Nepal) Sajin Thapa Magar	Madhyapur Youth Association	1
8	(Nepal) Manjil Khadka	Annapurna Club RCT	1
8	(Nepal) Nikesh Shrestha	Jhapa Football Club	1
8	(Nepal) Kamal Biswokarma	Tusal Youth Club	1
8	(Nepal) Sujan Biswokarma	Chayasal Youth Club	1
8	(Nepal) Rujan Neupane	Planning Boyz United	1
8	(Nepal) Devraj Tamang	Tusal Youth Club	1
8	(Nepal) Manish Limbu	Jhapa Football Club	1
8	(Nepal) Aayush Timsina	Shree Bhagwati Club	1
8	(Nepal) Man Kumar Tamang	Boys Union Club	1
8	(Nepal) Sujan Rana	Shree Kumari Club	1
8	(Nepal) Rit Bahadur Gurung	Madhyapur Youth Association	1
8	(Nepal) Bikram Thokar	Birgunj United	1
8	(Nepal) Dewas Chhantyal	Shree Bhagwati Club	1
8	(Nepal) Nischaya Thapa	Tusal Youth Club	1
8	(Nepal) Subash Bam	Chayasal Youth Club	1
8	(Nepal) Jamin Laksam	Nayabasti Youth Club	1
8	(Nepal) Sajan Pakhrin	Annapurna Club RCT	1
8	(Nepal) Sandesh Khatri	Saraswoti Youth Club	1
8	(Nepal) Abhishek Bholan	Annapurna Club RCT	1
8	(Nepal) Sanjay Limbu	Annapurna Club RCT	1
8	(Nepal) Phatteman Ghale	Saraswoti Youth Club	1
8	(Nepal) Bikarna Shrestha	Madhyapur Youth Association	1
8	(Nepal) Prajwal Thapa Magar	Madhyapur Youth Association	1
8	(Nepal) Babin Bohara	Jhapa Football Club	1
8	(Nepal) Suman Yongya	Nayabasti Youth Club	1
8	(Nepal) Gyanendra Joshi	Saraswoti Youth Club	1
8	(Nepal) Pujan Thapa	Planning Boyz United	1
8	(Nepal) Mausam Rai	Shree Kumari Club	1
8	(Nepal) Kamal Thing	Chayasal Youth Club	1
8	(Nepal) Sanjay Chaudhary	Birgunj United	1
8	(Nepal) Shishir Lekhi	Boys Union Club	1
8	(Nepal) Rahul Khadka	Madhyapur Youth Association	1
8	(Nepal) Rajkumar Syangtan	Shree Kumari Club	1
8	(Nepal) Sujan Syangtan	Boys Union Club	1
8	(Nepal) Susan Lama	Boys Union Club	1
8	(Nepal) Sujan Shrestha	Boys Union Club	1
8	(Nepal) Sagar bantha Tharu	Birgunj United	1
8	(Nepal) Rambabu K. Shah	Planning Boyz United	1
8	(Nepal) Narbu Tamang	Saraswoti Youth Club	1

=== Own Goal ===
Rank	Player	Club	Goals
1	(Nepal) Amar Shrestha	Annapurna RCT Club	1
1	(Nepal) Pema Tamang	Jhapa Football Club	1
1	(Nepal) Manish Gurung	Brigade Boys Club	1
1	(Nepal) Nyima Wangdel Tamang	Nayabasti Youth Club	1
1	(Nepal) Man Kumar Tamang	Boys Union Club	1
1	(Nepal) Sandip Raut	Bansbari Club	1
1	(Nepal) Susan Lama	Boys Union Club	1
1	(Nepal) Palden Tamang	Shree Kumari Club	1
1	(Nepal) Arun Shah	Shree Kumari Club	1
1	(Nepal) Nabin Khabas	Nayabasti Youth Club	1

=== Hat-tricks ===
Player	For	Against	Goal Scored	Result	Date	Venue
(Nepal) Mukunda Kumar Niure	Brigade Boys Club	Chyasal Youth Club	4	4-1	19 May 2025	Dasarath Stadium
(Nepal) Sandip Limbu	Bansbari Club	Boys Union Club	3	3-4	22 May 2025	Dasarath Stadium
(Nepal) Fagu Ram Tharu	Planning Boyz United	Tushal Youth Club	5	8-3	23 May 2025	Dasarath Stadium

=== Clean sheets ===
Rank	Player	Club	Clean sheets
1	(Nepal) Sandip Raut	Bansbari Club	4
1	(Nepal) Pramijay Gachhadar	Birgunj United	4
1	(Nepal) Roshan Khadka	Shree Kumari Club	4
2	(Nepal) Yubraj Puri	Planning Boyz United	3
2	(Nepal) Ashok Regmi	Brigade Boys Club	3
2	(Nepal) Nabin Pariyar	Planning Boyz United	3
2	(Nepal) Tek Raj Limbu	Jhapa Football Club	3
2	(Nepal) Bishal Gurung	Chayasal Youth Club	3
3	(Nepal) Yanjan Shrestha	Boys Union Club	2
3	(Nepal) Bhim Pun	Tusal Youth Club	2
3	(Nepal) Saroj Tamang	Shree Bhagwati Club	2
3	(Nepal) Yogesh Dhimal	Nayabasti Youth Club	2
3	(Nepal) Jeevan Bhattarai	Shree Bhagwati Club	2
3	(Nepal) Amar Bahadur Newar	Madhyapur Youth Association	2
3	(Nepal) Saphal Timalsina	Saraswoti Youth Club	2
3	(Nepal) Biplop Gurung	Boys Union Club	2
4	Roshan Nepal	Chayasal Youth Club	1
4	(Nepal) Akash Ranabhat	Annapurna Club RCT	1
4	(Nepal) Sher Bahadur Dhimal	Jhapa Football Club	1
4	(Nepal) Ashim Jung Karki	Jhapa Football Club	1
4	(Nepal) Rojan Thing	Saraswoti Youth Club	1
4	(Nepal) Rajkumar Ghising	Madhyapur Youth Association	1
4	(Nepal) Pema Tamang	Jhapa Football Club	1
4	(Nepal) Sandip Ojha	Madhyapur Youth Association	1

== Awards ==
=== End-of-Season Awards ===
Award	Winner	Club
Player of the Season	(Nepal) Pratap Sing Rai	Planning Boyz United
Top Scorer	(Nepal) Faguram Tharu	Planning Boyz United
Best Goalkeeper	(Nepal) Pramijay Gachhadar	Birgunj United
Best Coach	(Nepal) Chandra Bhandari	Boys Union Club
Fair Play	Planning Boyz United	

== Broadcast rights ==
Prime Television HD will broadcast the league live on both its TV channel and YouTube.
