= 2010 Martyr's Memorial A-Division League =

Martyr's Memorial A-Division League
- Season: 2010
- Champions: Nepal Police Club
- Relegated: Boys Union Club; Sankata Club
- 2010 AFC President's Cup: New Road Team (Note: As there was no league held in 2009, the top team after the first half of the 2010 season was named as the Nepalese representative by the All Nepal Football Association for the 2010 AFC President's Cup.)
- 2011 AFC President's Cup: Nepal Police Club
- Matches: 156
- Goals: 357 (2.29 per match)
- Top goalscorer: (Nepal) Santosh Sahukhala (19)
- Biggest win: 8 goals APF Club 8-0 Machhindra Football Club

The 2010 Martyr's Memorial A-Division League (known as the Martyrs' Memorial San Miguel 'A' Division League Football Tournament 2010 for sponsorship reasons) was the 38th season of Nepal's Martyr's Memorial A-Division League since its establishment in 1954/55. A total of 12 teams competed in the league. The season began on 12 February 2010 and concluded on 14 June 2010.

It was the first time the league was held since 2006–07, as the seasons in the meantime had been cancelled due to conflicts between ANFA and the clubs.

Defending champion Nepal Police Club won the league with two matches remaining.

The 1971 League Champion Boys Union Club was relegated to B Division after 58 years in league history by virtue of goal difference with APF Club, having the equal 22 points whereas losing the 15 matches among 22 three times league champion Sankata Club also relegated to B Division after 37 years.

== Teams ==
Team	Location	Previous Season
APF Club	Kathmandu	5th
Nepal Police Club	Kathmandu	1st (Note: Mahendra Police Club was renamed as Nepal Police Club for the 2010 season.)
New Road Team	Kathmandu	8th
Nepal Army Club	Kathmandu	2nd
Machhindra Football Club	Kathmandu	6th
Boys Union Club	Kathmandu	12th
Manang Marshyangdi Club	Kathmandu	4th
Ranipokhari Corner Team	Kathmandu	10th
Sankata Club	Kathmandu	9th
Friends Club	Lalitpur	7th
Jawalakhel Youth Club	Lalitpur	11th
Three Star Club	Lalitpur	3rd

== League table ==
Pos	Team	Pld	W	D	L	GF	GA	GD	Pts	Qualification or relegation
1	Nepal Police Club (C)	22	14	8	0	35	8	+27	50	Qualification for 2011 AFC President's Cup
2	Three Star Club	22	12	7	3	41	15	+26	43	
3	New Road Team	22	12	4	6	39	29	+10	40	Qualification for 2010 AFC President's Cup
4	Nepal Army Club	22	11	6	5	38	21	+17	39	
5	Manang Marshyangdi Club	22	8	6	8	30	32	−2	30	
6	Machhindra Football Club	22	7	6	9	20	27	−7	27	
7	Jawalakhel Youth Club	22	7	6	9	27	43	−16	27	
8	Friends Club	22	7	4	11	27	41	−14	25	
9	Ranipokhari Corner Team	22	6	5	11	24	31	−7	23	
10	APF Club	22	6	4	12	28	36	−8	22	
11	Boys Union Club (R)	22	6	4	12	28	39	−11	22	Relegation to 2011 Martyr's Memorial B-Division League
12	Sankata Club (R)	22	5	2	15	20	35	−15	17	Relegation to 2011 Martyr's Memorial B-Division League

Updated to match(es) played on 4 May 2013. Source:
Rules for classification: 1) points; 2) goal difference; 3) number of goals scored.
(C) Champions; (R) Relegated

== Awards ==
	Player	Club
Best Coach	(Nepal) Birat Krishna Shrestha	Nepal Police Club
Best Goalkeeper	(Nepal) Kiran Chemjong	Three Star Club
Best Defender	(Nepal) Rohit Chand	Machhindra Football Club
Best Midfielder	(Nepal) Parbat Pandey	Nepal Police Club
Best Striker	(Nepal) Santosh Sahukhala	Nepal Police Club
