= 2011 Martyr's Memorial B-Division League =

Martyr's Memorial B-Division League
- Season: 2011
- Champions: Sankata Club
- Promoted: Sankata Club; Madhyapur Youth Association
- Relegated: Gyan Bhairab Club; Sanogaucharan Youth Club; Boys Sports Club; Kumari Youth Club
- Goals: 261

The 2011 Martyr's Memorial B-Division League season, also known as Martyrs Memorial RedBull 'B' Division League Football Tournament 2068 for sponsorship reasons, was the 2011 edition of the second-tier club football competition in Nepal. The season started on 24 August and ended on 27 September 2011. All matches were played at Nepal Police Foundation Ground.

== Teams ==
| Team | Location | Previous season |
|---|---|---|
| Madhyapur Youth Association | Bhaktapur, Bhaktapur | 2nd (2008 C-Division League) |
| Birgunj Youth Academy Club | Birgunj, Parsa | 6th |
| Boys Sports Club | Kathmandu, Kathmandu | ? (2008–2009 B-Division League) (Note: In the 2008–2009, two parallel B Division leagues were organize, one by the All Nepal Football Association, won by Swoyambhu Youth Club and one by the Nepal Football Association (NFA) won by Saraswoti Youth Club. After reconciliation, the four top teams from both leagues were promoted to 2011 Martyr's Memorial A-Division League.) |
| Boys Union Club | Kathmandu, Kathmandu | 11th (2010 Martyr's Memorial A-Division League) |
| Gyan Bhairb Club | Kathmandu, Kathmandu | ? (2008–2009 B-Division League) |
| Kathmandu Club | Kathmandu, Kathmandu | 5th |
| Mahabir Youth Club | Kathmandu, Kathmandu | ? (2008–2009 B-Division League) |
| Sankata BSC | Kathmandu, Kathmandu | 12th (2010 Martyr's Memorial A-Division League) |
| Sanogaucharan Youth Club | Kathmandu, Kathmandu | 9th |
| Samajik Youth Club | Kathmandu, Kathmandu | 1st (2008 C-Division League) |
| Tushal Youth Club | Kathmandu, Kathmandu | 8th |
| Chyasal Youth Club | Lalitpur, Lalitpur | 3rd (2008 C-Division League) |
| Pulchowk Sports Club | Lalitpur, Lalitpur | ? (2008–2009 B-Division League) |
| Kumari Youth Club | | 7th |
| Star Club | | ? (2008–2009 B-Division League) |

== Venues ==
The league was played centrally at one venue in Kathmandu. However, commentators complained that the ground was not ready to host the league, with no line markings on the first match day. Goal Nepal claimed that the dust the ground was covered in caused chest infections among players.

Nepal

Kathmandu
Nepal Police Foundation Ground
Capacity:

== League table ==
| Pos | Team | Pld | W | D | L | GF | GA | GD | Pts | Promotion or relegation |
|---|---|---|---|---|---|---|---|---|---|---|
| 1 | Sankata Club (C, P) | 14 | 9 | 3 | 2 | 36 | 18 | +18 | 30 | Promotion to 2012–13 Martyr's Memorial A-Division League and Qualification to 2012 B-Division National League |
| 2 | Madhyapur Youth Association (P) | 14 | 8 | 5 | 1 | 22 | 11 | +11 | 29 | Promotion to 2012–13 Martyr's Memorial A-Division League and Qualification to 2012 B-Division National League |
| 3 | Birgunj Youth Academy Club | 14 | 7 | 7 | 0 | 22 | 7 | +15 | 28 | Qualification to 2012 B-Division National League |
| 4 | Pulchowk Sports Club | 14 | 7 | 5 | 2 | 13 | 8 | +5 | 26 | Qualification to 2012 B-Division National League |
| 5 | Chyasal Youth Club | 14 | 7 | 3 | 4 | 21 | 15 | +6 | 24 | Qualification to 2012 B-Division National League |
| 6 | Tushal Youth Club | 14 | 7 | 3 | 4 | 20 | 19 | +1 | 24 | Qualification to 2012 B-Division National League |
| 7 | Star Club | 14 | 7 | 2 | 5 | 21 | 19 | +2 | 23 | |
| 8 | Samajik Youth Club | 14 | 5 | 5 | 4 | 18 | 18 | 0 | 20 | |
| 9 | Kathmandu Club | 14 | 5 | 2 | 7 | 18 | 20 | −2 | 17 | |
| 10 | Boys Union Club | 14 | 4 | 4 | 6 | 14 | 16 | −2 | 16 | |
| 11 | Mahabir Club | 14 | 5 | 1 | 8 | 22 | 28 | −6 | 16 | |
| 12 | Gyan Bhairb Club (R) | 14 | 3 | 3 | 8 | 3 | 11 | −8 | 12 | Relegation to 2012 Martyr's Memorial C-Division League |
| 13 | Sanogaucharan Youth Club (R) | 14 | 2 | 5 | 7 | 14 | 23 | −9 | 11 | Relegation to 2012 Martyr's Memorial C-Division League |
| 14 | Boys Sports Club (R) | 14 | 2 | 1 | 11 | 12 | 25 | −13 | 7 | Relegation to 2012 Martyr's Memorial C-Division League |
| 15 | Kumari Youth Club (R) | 14 | 1 | 3 | 10 | 5 | 23 | −18 | 6 | Relegation to 2012 Martyr's Memorial C-Division League |

Updated to match(es) played on 4 April 2014. Source:
Rules for classification: 1) points; 2) goal difference; 3) number of goals scored.
(C) Champions; (P) Promoted; (R) Relegated
