= Sankata Football Club =

Nepali Football Team

Sankata
- Full name: Sankata Football Club
- Nickname: Sankata Boys
- Short name: SFC
- Founded: 1950; 76 years ago
- Ground: Dasarath Rangasala Stadium, Kathmandu
- Capacity: 15,000
- Owner: Sankata Boys Sports Club
- Chairman: Indraman Tuladhar
- Head coach: Rabindra Shilakar
- League: Martyr's Memorial A-Division League; Nepal National League (sometimes)
- 2023: Martyr's Memorial A-Division League, 9th of 14
Home colours	Away colours

Sankata Football Club, commonly known as Sankata FC, is a Nepalese professional football club based in Kathmandu, that competes in the Martyr's Memorial A-Division League. Named after Sankata Temple at Te Bahal, the club has won the national championship three times, most recently in 1985.

== History ==
Sankata was a successful club in the 1980s, winning the national championship in 1980, 1983 and 1985. After a string of poor performances and winning just five games out of 22 in the A-Division League 2010, the club was relegated to the Martyr's Memorial B-Division League after 37 years. However, they won the 2011 Martyr's Memorial B-Division League and has since been playing in Nepal's highest league. The club was runner-up in the 2018–19 Martyr's Memorial A-Division League, making it the best season since the 1980s, in what The Kathmandu Post called a "stunning" performance.

== Honours ==
- Martyr's Memorial A-Division League
  - Winners: 1980, 1983, 1985
- Martyr's Memorial B-Division League
  - Winners: 1958, 2011
- Tribhuvan Challenge Shield
  - Winners: 1979
- Simara Gold Cup
  - Winners: 2073, 2078
- Rhino Gold Cup
  - Winners: 2074
- Budha Subba Gold Cup
  - Runners-up: 2017
- Aaha! Gold Cup
  - Winners: 2077, 2079
- Birat Gold Cup
  - Winners: 2021
- ANFA Cup
  - Runners-up: 2014
- CEM Gold Cup
  - Runners-up (1): 2014

== League finishes ==
Champions	Runners-up	Third place	Promoted	Relegated

Season	League	Position
2000	A-Division	9th
2003-04	A-Division	6th
2004	A-Division	8th
2005–2006	A-Division	8th
2006–2007	A-Division	9th
2010	A-Division	12th
2011	B-Division	1st
2012	National League B-Division	3rd
2012–13	A-Division	11th
2013–14	A-Division	5th
2015	National League	DNP
2018–19	A-Division	2nd
2019–20	A-Division	7th
2021–22	A-Division	7th
2023	A-Division	9th

== Under-18 ==
=== Performance record ===
Performance of Sankata BSC U-18 in ANFA Youth Leagues
Year	Tournament	Final Position
2024	U-18 ANFA Youth League	3rd

== Under-16 ==
=== Performance record ===
Performance of Sankata BSC U-16 in ANFA Youth Leagues
Year	Tournament	Final Position
2023	U-16 ANFA Youth League	3rd
2025	U-16 ANFA Youth League	4th
