= 2012–13 Martyr's Memorial A-Division League =

Martyr's Memorial A-Division League
- Season: 2012-13
- Champions: Three Star Club
- Relegated: Madhyapur Youth Association; Bansbari Football Club; Boudha Football Club
- AFC President's Cup: Three Star Club
- Matches: 148
- Goals: 366 (2.47 per match)
- Top goalscorer: Santosh Sahukhala (17 goals)
- Biggest home win: 6 goals Three Star Club 6-0 Bansbari Football Club; Saraswoti Youth Club 8-2 Bansbari Football Club
- Highest scoring: 10 goals Saraswoti Youth Club 8-2 Bansbari Football Club
- Longest winning run: 6 matches Three Star Club
- Longest unbeaten run: 12 matches Three Star Club
- Longest losing run: 6 matches Boudha Football Club

The 2012 Martyr's Memorial A-Division League season, also known as the Martyrs' Memorial Red Bull 'A' Division League Football Tournament 2012 for sponsorship reasons, was the 40th season of Nepal's Martyr's Memorial A-Division League since its establishment in 1954/55. A total of 16 teams competed in the league. The season began on 20 November 2012 and concluded on 1 April 2013. Nepal Police Club were the defending champions, having won their fourth A- Division League title the previous season.

After the season, New Road Team would be relegated to 2016 Martyr's Memorial B-Division League for financial difficulties.

== Teams ==
Team	Location	Previous Season
Madhyapur Youth Association	Bhaktapur	2nd (2011 B-Division)
APF Club	Kathmandu	12th
Bansbari Football Club	Kathmandu	10th
Boudha Football Club	Kathmandu	11th
Himalayan Sherpa Club	Kathmandu	5th
Machhindra Football Club	Kathmandu	14th
Manang Marshyangdi Club	Kathmandu	2nd
Nepal Army Club	Kathmandu	8th
Nepal Police Club	Kathmandu	1st
New Road Team	Kathmandu	7th
Ranipokhari Corner Team	Kathmandu	6th
Sankata Club	Kathmandu	1st (2011 B-Division)
Saraswoti Youth Club	Kathmandu	13th
Jawalakhel Youth Club	Lalitpur	3rd
Friends Club	Lalitpur	9th
Three Star Club	Lalitpur	4th

== League table ==
The top eight teams qualified for the Super League.

Pos	Team	Pld	W	D	L	GF	GA	GD	Pts	Qualification or relegation
1	Three Star Club	15	11	2	2	31	7	+24	35	Qualification for Super League
2	Nepal Army Club	15	8	4	3	19	6	+13	28	Qualification for Super League
3	Machhindra Football Club	15	8	3	4	22	16	+6	27	Qualification for Super League
4	Ranipokhari Corner Team	15	8	2	5	24	17	+7	26 (Note: RCT: 4 pts; MMC: 3 pts; NRT: 1 pt)	Qualification for Super League
5	Manang Marshyangdi Club	15	7	5	3	25	13	+12	26	Qualification for Super League
6	New Road Team	15	7	5	3	26	14	+12	26	Qualification for Super League
7	Friends Club	15	6	7	2	20	8	+12	25	Qualification for Super League
8	Nepal Police Club	15	6	5	4	14	12	+2	23 (Note: NPC 3-0 SYC)	Qualification for Super League
9	Saraswoti Youth Club	15	7	2	6	27	25	+2	23	
10	Himalayan Sherpa Club	15	7	1	7	19	17	+2	22	
11	Sankata Club	15	5	5	5	12	15	−3	20	
12	APF Club	15	5	1	9	18	32	−14	16	
13	Jawalakhel Youth Club	15	4	2	9	16	26	−10	14	
14	Madhyapur Youth Association (R)	15	3	4	8	12	21	−9	13	Relegation to 2014 Martyr's Memorial B-Division League
15	Bansbari Football Club (R)	15	1	3	11	13	42	−29	6	Relegation to 2014 Martyr's Memorial B-Division League
16	Boudha Football Club (R)	15	1	1	13	11	38	−27	4	Relegation to 2014 Martyr's Memorial B-Division League

Updated to match(es) played on 4 May 2013. Source:
Rules for classification: 1) points, 2) head-to-head points, 3) head-to-head goal difference
(R) Relegated

== Super League ==
Pos	Team	Pld	W	D	L	GF	GA	GD	Pts	Qualification
1	Three Star Club (C)	22	13	4	5	38	14	+24	43	2013 AFC President's Cup
2	Manang Marshyangdi Club	22	11	8	3	36	16	+20	41	
3	Nepal Army Club	22	11	6	5	27	13	+14	39	
4	Friends Club	22	9	10	3	30	15	+15	37	
5	New Road Team	22	10	5	7	33	23	+10	35	
6	Machhindra Football Club	22	9	7	6	26	23	+3	34	
7	Nepal Police Club	22	8	8	6	21	19	+2	32	
8	Ranipokhari Corner Team	22	9	3	10	27	27	0	30	

Updated to match(es) played on 4 May 2013. Source:
Rules for classification: 1) points; 2) goal difference; 3) number of goals scored.
(C) Champions

== Top scorers ==
Rank	Player	Club	Goals
1	(Nepal) Santosh Sahukhala	Three Star Club	17
2	(Tanzania) Yona Elias	Manang Marshyangdi Club	16
3	(Nepal) Bharat Khawas	Nepal Army Club	11
3	(Nepal) Amar Dangol	Ranipokhari Corner Team	11
5	(Nepal) Anil Gurung	Manang Marshyangdi Club	10
