= Jawalakhel YC =

Nepali association football club

- Full name: Jawalakhel Youth Club
- Nickname: Zoo Keepers
- Founded: 1972; 54 years ago
- Ground: Jawalakhel Ground, Lalitpur
- Capacity: 15,000
- Manager: Sunil Khumar Shretsha
- League: Martyr's Memorial A-Division League; Nepal National League (sometimes)
- 2023: Martyr's Memorial A-Division League, 4th of 14
Home colours	Away colours

Jawalakhel Youth Club, also known as Jawalakhel YC, is a Nepali professional football club from Jawalakhel, Lalitpur, Nepal. They play in the Nepalese first division, the Martyr's Memorial A-Division League. Their home venue is Jawalakhel Ground in Lalitpur.

== Squad ==
As of 19 March 2023

Note: Flags indicate national team as defined under FIFA eligibility rules; some limited exceptions apply. Players may hold more than one non-FIFA nationality.

No.	Pos.	Nation	Player
1	GK	NEP	Anish Deula
2	DF	NEP	Simanta Thapa (Captain)
4	DF	NEP	Chhiring Lama
5	DF	NEP	Puskar Khadka
6	DF	NEP	Aditya Chaudhary
7	FW	GUI	Fode Fofana
8	MF	NEP	Bishal Tamang
9	FW	NEP	Hishub Thapaliya
11	FW	NEP	Sunil Khadka
12	MF	NEP	Binod KC
13	DF	NEP	Santosh Dahal
14	MF	NEP	Bipin Kandel

No.	Pos.	Nation	Player
15	MF	NEP	Sunil Ghalan
16	MF	NEP	Harish Raj Bhatta
17	FW	LES	Masoabi Nkoto
18	GK	NEP	Ishwor Gurung
19	DF	NEP	Raj Kandangarwa
20	MF	UZB	Abdulaziz Nishonbaev
21	FW	NEP	Samiraj Thokar
22	GK	NEP	Unesh Chaudhary
25	DF	IND	Rahul Khokhar
26	MF	GHA	Abdul Majid Shamatey
28	MF	NEP	Sanjiv Karki

== League finishes ==
The season-by-season performance of JYC since 2000:

Season	League	Position
2000	A-Division	5th
2001–2002	League not held	
2003–2004	A-Division	7th
2004	A-Division	6th
2005–06	A-Division	11th
2006–07	A-Division	11th
2007–2009	League not held due to conflicts between ANFA and the clubs	
2010	A-Division	7th
2011	A-Division	3rd
2011–12	National	4th
2012–13	A-Division	13th
2013–14	A-Division	11th
2015	National	Did not participate
2016-18	League not held	
2018–19	A-Division	10th
2019–20	A-Division	6th
2021–22	A-Division	9th
2023	A-Division	4th

== Under-18 ==
=== Performance record ===
Performance of Jawalakhel YC U-18 in ANFA Youth Leagues
Year	Tournament	Final Position
2024	U-18 ANFA Youth League	7th
