= Madhyapur Youth Association =

Nepalese football club

- Full name: Madhyapur Youth Association
- Nickname: MYA
- Founded: 2008; 18 years ago
- Ground: Madhyapur Youth Association Ground
- Capacity: 3000+
- Chairman: Upendra Man Singh
- Manager: Upendra Man Singh
- League: Martyr's Memorial B-Division League
- 2025: 8th
Home colours

Madhyapur Youth Association is a Nepali association football club based in Thimi, Bhaktapur. The club plays in the Martyr's Memorial B-Division League. It was founded in 2008 by former national goalkeeper Upendra Man Singh. In 2012, the team became the first club from Bhaktapur to reach the Martyr's Memorial A-Division League but got relegated in the same season.

== History ==
In 2008, former national team captain Upendra Man Singh with a few other people having football background established a social club. It did social work and also gave football training to local youths to keep them from bad habits. Football For Education is the club's motto. The team gained promotion from the 2010 Martyr's Memorial C-Division League and again from the 2011 Martyr's Memorial B-Division League. They reached the semi-finals of the inaugural Ncell Cup knockout tournament, losing 2–0 to Ranipokhari Corner Team. They failed to maintain that form in the 2012-13 Martyr's Memorial A-Division League and got relegated by just one point.

== Fans ==
MYA has a large fan-base particularly in the Bhaktapur district and possibly the biggest fan following in Nepal. They had the highest numbers of fans attending the games in the 2012-13 Martyr's Memorial A-Division League.

MYA had got into trouble with the ANFA after the fans started throwing the seats off the Dasarath Rangasala Stadium after they got relegated, accusing the referee of bias.

== Colours ==
The colours of the jersey (red and black) is designed to match the Haku Patasi, a traditional dress worn by the Newari women in the Bhaktapur area.

== Team ==
Note: Flags indicate national team as defined under FIFA eligibility rules; some limited exceptions apply. Players may hold more than one non-FIFA nationality.

No.	Pos.	Nation	Player
-	GK	NEP	Bikesh Kuthu
-		NEP	Bal Gopal Shakhala
-		NEP	Dorje Tamang
-		NEP	Saroj Gharti Magar
-		NEP	Shikayuchi Sensei
-		NEP	Kishor Duwa
-		NEP	Ranjit Lama
-		NEP	Thakur Shrestha
-		NEP	Naresh Pokhrel
-	FW	NEP	Niranjan Raimajhi

No.	Pos.	Nation	Player
-		NEP	Rajesh Shrestha
-		NEP	Binod Bista
-		NEP	Rajendra Raha Magarb
-		NEP	Rupendra Bhagya
-		NEP	Khadka
-	RFW	NEP	Dilip Khadka
-		NEP	Jeevan Sinkemana
-		NEP	Subarna Bikram Karki
-	FW	NEP	Milan Adhikari

== League finishes ==
The season-by-season performance of Madhyapur Youth Association:

Champions	Runners-up	Third place	Promoted	Relegated

Season	League	Position
2008	Martyr's Memorial C-Division League	2nd
2009-2010	League not held	
2011	Martyr's Memorial B-Division League	2nd
2012–13	Martyr's Memorial A-Division League	14th
2014	Martyr's Memorial B-Division League	2nd
2016	Martyr's Memorial B-Division League	11th
2019	Martyr's Memorial B-Division League	4th (Group stage)
2020	Martyr's Memorial B-Division League	5th
2022	Martyr's Memorial B-Division League	7th
2025	Martyr's Memorial B-Division League	8th

== Honours ==
=== National ===
- B-Division National League
  - Champions: 2012
- Martyr's Memorial C-Division League
  - Runners-up: 2008–09
