= 2008 Martyr's Memorial B-Division League =

Martyr's Memorial B-Division League
- Season: 2008
- Champions: Swayambhu Club
- Promoted: Himalayan Sherpa Club; Bansbari Club; Koilapani Polestar Club
- Matches played: 36
- Goals scored: 126 (3.5 per match)

The 2008 Martyr's Memorial B-Division League was the 2008 season of the Martyr's Memorial B-Division League. A total of 9 teams competed in the league. The season began on 9 September 2008 and concluded on 29 September February 2006. Swayambhu Club won the league and was promoted along with Himalayan Sherpa Club, Bansbari Club, and Koilapani Polestar Club. Being based in Nawalparasi, Koilapani would therefore become the first ever team from outside the Kathmandu Valley to be promoted to the A-Division League.

== Teams ==
Team	Location
Birgunj Youth Academy Club	Birgunj, Parsa
Bansbari Club	Kathmandu, Kathmandu
Himalayan Sherpa Club	Kathmandu, Kathmandu
Kathmandu Club	Kathmandu, Kathmandu
Sanogaucharan Youth Club	Kathmandu, Kathmandu
Swayambhu Club	Kathmandu, Kathmandu
Tushal Youth Club	Kathmandu, Kathmandu
Koilapani Polestar Club	Nawalparasi
Kumari Youth Club	

== League table ==
Pos	Team	Pld	W	D	L	GF	GA	GD	Pts	Promotion
1	Swayambhu Club (C, P)	8	7	1	0	18	9	+9	22	Promotion to 2011 Martyr's Memorial A-Division League
2	Himalayan Sherpa Club (P)	8	4	3	1	19	7	+12	15	Promotion to 2011 Martyr's Memorial A-Division League
3	Bansbari Club (P)	8	3	4	1	14	4	+10	13	Promotion to 2011 Martyr's Memorial A-Division League
4	Koilapani Polestar Club (P)	8	3	3	2	23	12	+11	12	Promotion to 2011 Martyr's Memorial A-Division League
5	Kathmandu Club	8	3	3	2	14	10	+4	12	
6	Birgunj Youth Academy Club	8	3	2	3	12	7	+5	11	
7	Kumari Youth Club	8	3	2	3	11	16	−5	11	
8	Tushal Youth Club	8	1	0	7	6	22	−16	3	
9	Sanogaucharan Youth Club	8	0	0	8	9	39	−30	0	

Updated to match(es) played on 04 April 2014. Source:
Rules for classification: 1) points; 2) goal difference; 3) number of goals scored.
(C) Champions; (P) Promoted

== Controversy ==
On 18 September 2008, in a match against Kathmandu Club, players and officials of Kumari Youth Club attacked and beat referee Sachin Amatya, for which the match was abandoned in the 34th minute. All Nepal Football Association sanctioned multiple of Kumari Youth Club's players and officials, including suspension of the team's captain Bikash Gurung for two years.
