= Church Boys United =

Nepali football club

- Full name: Church Boys United Football Club
- Nickname: The White Lions
- Founded: 2009; 17 years ago
- Ground: Chyasal Stadium
- Capacity: 10,000
- Chairman: Tanka Lal Rai
- Head coach: Bal Gopal Maharjan
- League: Martyr's Memorial A-Division League; Nepal National League (sometimes)
- 2023: Champions
- Website: churchboys.org/index.php
Home colours	Away colours

Church Boys United (formerly known as Church Boys FC) is a Nepali professional football club from Balkumri, neighborhood of Lalitpur, that competes in the Martyr's Memorial A-Division League. The club was first promoted to Martyr's Memorial A-Division League in 2022, having won the 2022 Martyr's Memorial B-Division League.

== History ==
The club was founded in 2009, but only participated in local tournaments. In 2019, they qualified for the Martyr's Memorial C-Division League, which was their fifth attempt in C-Division League Qualifier (previously known as Martyr's Memorial 'D' Division League) and were promoted to the top-level Martyr's Memorial A-Division League within two seasons, in what The Kathmandu Post highlighted as "a remarkable journey".

In 2023, the club clinched Simara Gold Cup title, defeating Himalayan Sherpa Club in the final.

The club was featured in the 40th edition of the Sikkim Gold Cup in November 2024.

== Record by seasons ==
The season-by-season performance of Church Boys United. Until 2019, the team only participated in local tournaments, while attempting to qualify for the third-tier Martyr's Memorial C-Division League. The earliest qualification was in 2012.

Champions	Runners-up	Third place	Promoted	Relegated

Season	League	Position
2019	C-Division Qualifiers	Promoted
2021	C-Division	1st
2022	B-Division	1st
2023	A-Division	1st

== Honours ==
=== League ===
- Martyr's Memorial A-Division League
  - champions (1): 2023
- Martyr's Memorial B-Division League
  - Champions (1): 2022
- Martyr's Memorial C-Division League
  - Champions (1): 2021

=== Cup ===
- Simara Gold Cup
  - Champions (1): 2023
- All India Governor's Gold Cup
  - Quarter-finals: 2024
