= Saraswoti Youth Club =

Nepalese football club

- Full name: Saraswoti Youth Club
- Nickname(s): SYC
- Founded: 1977; 48 years ago
- Stadium: Dasarath Rangasala Stadium
- Capacity: 15,000
- Chairman: Uttam Raj Bhandari
- League: Martyr's Memorial B-Division League
- 2025: 9th

Saraswoti Youth Club is a Nepali football club from the Koteshwor neighborhood of Kathmandu that currently competes in the Martyr's Memorial B-Division League. They have also played in the Martyr's Memorial A-Division League in several seasons. They play at the Dasarath Rangasala Stadium, which has a capacity of 15,000 spectators.

== League finishes ==
The recent performance of Saraswoti Youth Club by seasons is as follows:

Champions	Runners-up	Third place	Promoted	Relegated

Season	League	Position
2006–07	Martyr's Memorial A-Division League	13th
2007	NFA B-Division	1st
2011	Martyr's Memorial A-Division League	13th
2011–12	Nepal National League	not qualified
2012–13	Martyr's Memorial A-Division League	9th
2013–14	Martyr's Memorial A-Division League	9th
2015	Nepal National League	banned by ANFA
2016–18	League not held	
2018–19	Martyr's Memorial A-Division League	9th
2019–20	Martyr's Memorial A-Division League	14th (Relegated)
2022	Martyr's Memorial B-Division League	7th
2025	Martyr's Memorial B-Division League	9th

== Honours ==
=== National ===
- Martyr's Memorial B-Division League
  - Champions (2): 2006, 2008–09 (Note: In the 2008-2009, two parallel B Division leagues were organize, one by the All Nepal Football Association, won by Swoyambhu Youth Club and one by the Nepal Football Association (NFA) won by Saraswoti Youth Club. After reconciliation, the four top teams from both leagues were promoted to 2011 Martyr's Memorial A-Division League.)
