= 2022 Martyr's Memorial B-Division League =

Martyr's Memorial B-Division League
- Season: 2022
- Dates: 2 March 2022 - 10 April 2022
- Champions: Church Boys United
- Promoted: Church Boys United; Khumaltar Youth Club
- Relegated: Jhamsikhel Youth Club; Samajik Youth Club
- Matches: 91
- Goals: 258 (2.84 per match)
- Top goalscorer: 11 goals Aashish Chapagain
- Highest scoring: Church Boys 5–2 Tushal; Madhyapur 5–2 Samajik
- All statistics correct as of complete.

The 2022 Martyr's Memorial B-Division League season was the 2022 edition of the Martyr's Memorial B-Division League. The tournament started on 2 March 2022.

== Team changes ==
Entering league		Exiting league	
Promoted from C-Division ▲	Relegated from 2019–20 A-Division ▼	Promoted to 2023 A-Division▲	Relegated to 2024 C-Division▼
Birgunj United; Church Boys United; Samajik Youth Club	Saraswoti Youth Club	Church Boys United; FC Khumaltar	Jhamsikhel Youth Club; Samajik Youth Club

== Teams ==
A total of 14 teams contested the league with a relegation system. Ten teams from the 2020 season, one team relegated from A-Division and three teams promoted from C-Division participated in the league. Saraswati Youth Club was relegated from 2019–20 season, while Church Boys, Birgunj United Club and Samajik Yuwa Club were promoted from the 2021 season.

Team	Location	Previous Season
Tushal Youth Club	Kathmandu, Bagmati Province	10th
Bansbari Club	Kathmandu, Bagmati Province	3rd
Ranipokhari Corner Team	Kathmandu, Bagmati Province	9th
Shree Kumari Club	Kathmandu, Bagmati Province	8th
Saraswati Youth Club	Kathmandu, Bagmati Province	14 (A-Division)
Church Boys United	Kathmandu, Bagmati Province	1st (C-Division)
Khumaltar Youth Club	Lalitpur, Bagmati Province	2nd
Boys Union Club	Lalitpur, Bagmati Province	4th
Jhamsikhel Youth Club	Lalitpur, Bagmati Province	11th
Madhyapur Youth Association	Madhyapur Thimi, Bagmati Province	5th
Shree Bhagwati Club	Tokha, Bagmati Province	6th
Nayabasti Youth Club	Gokarneshwar, Bagmati Province	7th
Samajik Youth Club	Gokarneshwar, Bagmati Province	3rd (C-Division)
Birgunj United	Birgunj, Madhesh Province	2nd (C-Division)

=== Personnel and kits ===
Team	Head Coach	Captain	Kit sponsor
Bansbari Club			Around the Himalayas; Siddharta Bank
Ranipokhari Corner Team			McDowell's No.1
Shree Kumari Club		Nir Bahadur Ale	Agricultural Development Bank of Nepal
Saraswati Youth Club			
Khumaltar Youth Club		Sabin K.C.	Season Family Restaurant
Boys Union Club		Bishnu Bahadur Sunar	Motul
Jhamsikhel Youth Club			Prabhu Bank
Tushal Youth Club			
Madhyapur Youth Association			BIZZ Education Conultancy
Shree Bhagwati Club	Sailesh Karmacharya		Tokha Municipality
Nayabasti Youth Club			Gokarneshwar Municipality
Samajik Youth Club			
Church Boys United		Sanam Rai	
Birgunj United		Dilmani Chaudhary	WINgel

== Venues ==
The league was played centrally in one venue in Lalitpur. For the final matchday, selected matches were played at Dasarath Rangasala.

Nepal

Kathmandu	Lalitpur
Dasarath Rangasala	ANFA Complex
Capacity: 15,000	Capacity: 6,000

== League table ==
Pos	Team	Pld	W	D	L	GF	GA	GD	Pts	Qualification
1	Church Boys United (C, P)	13	9	2	2	31	12	+19	29	Promotion to Martyr's Memorial A-Division League
2	Khumaltar Youth Club (P)	13	7	1	5	20	15	+5	22 (Note: Khumaltar ahead of Ranipokhari on head-to-head. KHU 3–1 RCT)	Promotion to Martyr's Memorial A-Division League
3	Ranipokhari Corner Team	13	6	4	3	20	12	+8	22	
4	Bansbari Club	13	5	4	4	20	17	+3	19	
5	Shree Bhagwati Club	13	5	3	5	19	21	−2	18	
6	Saraswoti Youth Club	13	4	5	4	18	21	−3	17 (Note: Saraswati ahead of Madhyapur on head-to-head. SAR 2–1 MYA)	
7	Madhyapur Youth Association	13	5	2	6	15	19	−4	17	
8	Boys Union Club	13	4	4	5	18	24	−6	16 (Note: Boys Union ahead of Birgunj United and Shree Kumari on head-to-head points. Boys Union 6, Birgunj United 3, Shree Kumari 0.)	
9	Birgunj United	13	4	4	5	18	18	0	16	
10	Shree Kumari Club	13	3	7	3	19	20	−1	16	
11	Tushal Youth Club	13	2	9	2	15	13	+2	15 (Note: TUS 1–1 NYB. Tushal ahead of Nayabasti on goal difference. Tuhsal +2, Nayabasti -6)	
12	Nayabasti Youth Club	13	3	6	4	17	23	−6	15	
13	Samajik Youth Club (R)	13	4	2	7	17	22	−5	14	Relegation to 2024 Martyr's Memorial C-Division League
14	Jhamsikhel Youth Club (R)	13	2	3	8	11	21	−10	9	Relegation to 2024 Martyr's Memorial C-Division League

Source: ANFA
Rules for classification: 1) Points; 2) head-to-head; 3) Goal difference; 4) Goals scored.
(C) Champions; (P) Promoted; (R) Relegated

== Results ==
Home \ Away	BC	BU	BUC	CBU	JYC	KYC	MYA	NYC	RCT	SYC	SAYC	SBC	SKC	TYC
Bansbari Club	—	1–1				0–1	6–0				1–3	2–1	1–1	0–0
Birgunj United	1–1	—	0–1	1–1				2–2	2–2	1–0	5–0			
Boys Union Club		1–0	—	1–6	1–3			2–3	1–1	1–3		1–2		
Church Boys United		1–1	6–1	—		2–0	2–0					1–2	1–1	5–2
Jhamsikhel Youth Club			3–1		—	0–2	1–3	1–1		0–1	1–1	1–3		0–0
Khumaltar Youth Club	1–0			0–2	2–0	—	0–1	4–0	3–1		1–2			0–3
Madhyapur Youth Association	0–6			0–2	3–1	1–0	—		0–2	5–2	1–2			0–0
Nayabasti Youth Club		2–2	3–2		1–1	0–4		—	1–0	2–1		1–1	2–2	
Ranipokhari Corner Team		2–2	1–1			1–3	2–0	0–1	—		2–0	2–0	1–1	
Samajik Youth Club		0–1	3–1		1–0		2–5	1–2		—		2–3	3–3	2–0
Saraswoti Youth Club	3–1	0–5			1–1	2–1	2–1		0–2		—		1–1	2–2
Shree Bhagwati Club	1–2		2–1	2–1	3–1			1–1	0–2	3–2		—		
Shree Kumari Club	1–1			1–1				2–2	1–1	3–3	1–1		—	1–1
Tushal Youth Club	0–0			2–5	0–0	3–0	0–0			0–2	2–2		1–1	—

Source: ANFA
Legend: Blue = home team win; Yellow = draw; Red = away team win.

=== Positions by round ===
Team ╲ Round	1	2	3	4	5	6	7	8	9	10	11	12	13
Church Boys United	2	1	1	1	1	3	1	1	1	1	1	1	1
Khumaltar Youth Club	5	5	3	5	9	5	8	11	9	4	4	3	2
Ranipokhari Corner Team	10	6	6	7	4	6	7	5	2	5	2	2	3
Bansbari Club	12	12	13	9	10	10	6	8	5	3	5	7	4
Shree Bhagwati Club	4	2	2	2	3	1	3	4	4	7	7	9	5
Saraswoti Youth Club	3	3	4	3	2	2	4	2	3	2	3	4	6
Madhyapur Youth Association	1	4	10	13	14	14	12	10	11	10	9	11	7
Boys Union Club	6	7	11	11	13	13	14	14	13	14	13	13	8
Birgunj United	9	10	7	8	8	8	5	7	10	11	10	5	9
Shree Kumari Club	8	9	8	10	11	11	10	9	6	9	11	6	10
Tushal Youth Club	14	14	12	12	6	7	9	6	8	8	8	10	11
Nayabasti Youth Club	7	8	9	4	5	4	2	3	7	6	6	8	12
Samajik Youth Club	13	13	14	14	12	12	11	12	12	12	12	12	13
Jhamsikhel Youth Club	11	11	5	6	7	9	13	13	14	13	14	14	14

Champion
Promoted
Relegation to C-Division

Updated to match(es) played on 20 March 2022. Source: ANFA

== Broadcast rights ==
All matches are streamed live on Eleven Sports.

== Controversy ==
On 23 March 2022, after losing against Bansbari Club, officials of Shree Bhagawati attacked referee Suman Shrestha. The following day, All Nepal Football Association sanctioned Shree Bhagawati Club coach Sailesh Karmacharya by banning him for three games. The club was also fined NPR 50,000.
