= Boys Union Club =

Nepalese football club

Boy's Union Club
- Nickname: Boy's Union Club
- Founded: 1952; 74 years ago
- Ground: Dasarath Rangasala Stadium, Kathmandu, Nepal
- Capacity: 25,000
- Chairman: Niraj Bahadur Raut
- Manager: Sujak Regmi
- Coach: Ravi Silwal
- League: Martyr's Memorial B-Division League
- 2025: 2nd Runner up of 2025 Martyr's Memorial B-Division League
- Website: https://www.facebook.com/profile.php?id=100063464675726
Home colours	Away colours

Boys Union Club is an association football club from Nepal. They play at 25,000 capacity Dasarath Rangasala Stadium. The club is a one-time Martyr's Memorial A-Division League champion, having won the title in 1975. More recently, they won the 2013 edition of the Martyr's Memorial B-Division League.

== League finishes ==
The season-by-season performance of Boys Union Club since 2000:

Champions	Runners-up	Third place	Promoted	Relegated

Season	League	Position
2000	Martyr's Memorial A-Division League	7th
2001-2002	League not held	
2003-04	Martyr's Memorial A-Division League	10th
2004	Martyr's Memorial A-Division League	11th
2005-06	Martyr's Memorial A-Division League	10th
2006-07	Martyr's Memorial A-Division League	12th
2007-2010	League not held	
2010	Martyr's Memorial A-Division League	11th
2011	Martyr's Memorial B-Division League	10th
2013	Martyr's Memorial B-Division League	1st
2013–14	Martyr's Memorial A-Division League	13th
2016	Martyr's Memorial B-Division League	8th
2019	Martyr's Memorial B-Division League	5th (Group B)
2020	Martyr's Memorial B-Division League	4th
2022	Martyr's Memorial B-Division League	8th
2025	Martyr's Memorial B-Division League	3rd

== Honours ==
=== National ===
- Martyr's Memorial A-Division League:
  - Champions: 1975
- Martyr's Memorial B-Division League:
  - Champions: 2013
