= Himalayan Sherpa Club =

- Full name: Himalayan Sherpa Club
- Nickname(s): The Sherpa
- Founded: 25 September 2006; 18 years ago
- Ground: Dasarath Rangasala Stadium
- Capacity: 15,000
- Manager: Suman Stretha
- League: Martyr's Memorial A-Division League
- 2023: 10th of 14
Home colours	Away colours

Himalayan Sherpa Club is a Nepali professional football club based in Kathmandu (originally from Hattigauda), that competes in the Martyr's Memorial A-Division League, the top flight of Nepali football. They play their home games at the Dasarath Rangasala Stadium.

== History ==
The club was founded on 25 September 2006 and played their first tournament at the 2007 edition of the Aaha! Gold Cup. According to RSSSF, the club was "promoted from 4th to 2nd level within 2 months". The club were promoted to the ANFA 'A' Division League one year later.

Due to financial disagreements between the League Association ANFA and the Nepal Football Association, the 2007/08 season was canceled before the start of the season. In the following three years, the league paused, the game operations only started again with the 2011 season. Himalayan Sherpa was fifth in its first season in the top Nepalese league of 18 clubs. The club managed to sign the Ugandan international Samuel Mubiru on loan from Uganda Revenue Authority SC in 2011/12, Tanzania's Castory Mumbala and two former Nigerian youth players Hope Rally and Segun Akinade. Mubiru became the top assist-giver of the league and was therefore ordered back to Uganda Revenue Authority SC after the expiry of his loan agreement. The club celebrated the greatest success in club history in its second season in the top division, when it took second place and thus won the runner-up title of the National League.

== Sponsorship ==
Since 2011, Yeti Airlines is sponsoring Himalayan Sherpa Club with Nrs 20 lakh per year for which the club's official name is Yeti Himalayan Sherpa Club.

== Record by seasons ==
Champions	Runners-up	Third place	Promoted	Relegated

Season	League	Position
2007	C-Division Qualifiers	1st (Group A)
2007–2008	C-Division	1st
2008	B-Division	2nd
2011	A-Division	5th
2011–12	National League	2nd
2012–13	A-Division	10th
2013–14	A-Division	7th
2015	National League	Banned
2018–19	A-Division	7th
2019–20	A-Division	10th
2021–22	A-Division	10th
2023	A-Division	10th

== Honours ==
=== National ===
- Martyr's Memorial B-Division League
  - Champions (1): 2007–08
- Simara Gold Cup
  - Champions (1): 2011
  - Runners-up (1): 2023

== Under-16 ==
=== Performance record ===
Performance of Himalayan Sherpa Club U-16 in ANFA Youth Leagues
Year	Tournament	Final Position
2025	U-16 ANFA Youth League	9th
