= 2011 Martyr's Memorial A-Division League =

Martyr's Memorial A-Division League
- Season: 2011
- Champions: Nepal Police Club
- Relegated: Swoyambhu Club; Brigade Boys Club; United Youth Club; Koilapani Polestar Club
- Matches: 153
- Goals: 490 (3.2 per match)
- Top goalscorer: Jumanu Rai (20 goals)
- Biggest home win: 7 goals Himalayan Sherpa Club 9-2 Koilapani Polestar Club; RCT 7-0 Koilapani Polestar Club; APF Club 7-0 Brigade Boys Club; Three Star Club 7-0 Machhindra Football Club
- Highest scoring: 11 goals Himalayan Sherpa Club 9-2 Koilapani Polestar Club

The 2011 Martyr's Memorial A-Division League (known as the Martyrs' Memorial Red Bull 'A' Division League Football Tournament 2011 for sponsorship reasons) was the 39th season of the A-Division League since its establishment in 1954/55. A total of 18 teams competed in the league. The season began on 28 April 2011 and concluded on 16 July 2011.

Defending champions Nepal Police Club won the league.

A record 18 teams participated in the league, playing a total of 153 matches. The duration of the season had to be reduced to final constraints and the timing of World Cup qualifiers. The major was due the inception of National League as the top-tier league of country. Therefore, the league returned to single leg round robin formation.

== Teams ==
In the 2008-2009 season, two parallel B Division leagues were organized, one by the All Nepal Football Association, won by Swoyambhu Youth Club and one by the Nepal Football Association (NFA) won by Saraswoti Youth Club. After reconciliation, the four top teams from both leagues were promoted to 2011 Martyr's Memorial A-Division League. Prior to the season, Tribhuvan Army Club changed their name back to Nepal Army Club. Being based in Nawalparasi, Koilapani was the first ever team from outside the Kathmandu Valley to be promoted to the A-Division League.

Team	Location	Previous Season
APF Club	Kathmandu	10th
Bansbari Football Club	Kathmandu	3rd 2008 ANFA B-Division
Boudha Football Club	Kathmandu	4th 2009 NFA B-Division
Himalayan Sherpa Club	Kathmandu	2nd 2008 ANFA B-Division
Machhindra Football Club	Kathmandu	6th
Manang Marshyangdi Club	Kathmandu	5th
Nepal Army Club	Kathmandu	4th
Nepal Police Club	Kathmandu	1st
New Road Team	Kathmandu	3rd
Ranipokhari Corner Team	Kathmandu	9th
Saraswoti Youth Club	Kathmandu	1st 2009 NFA B-Division
Swoyambhu Club	Kathmandu	1st 2008 ANFA B-Division
United Club	Kathmandu	2nd 2009 NFA B-Division
Brigade Boys Club	Lalitpur	3rd 2009 NFA B-Division
Friends Club	Lalitpur	8th
Jawalakhel Youth Club	Lalitpur	7th
Three Star Club	Lalitpur	2nd
Koilapani Polestar Club	Nawalparasi	4th 2008 ANFA B-Division

=== Personnel and kits ===
Team	Head Coach	Captain	Shirt Sponsor
APF Club			
Bansbari Football Club	(Nepal) Hari Om Shrestha		Mahindra
Boudha Football Club	(Nepal) Kiran Shrestha		
Himalayan Sherpa Club	(Nepal) Upendraman Singh		Yeti Airlines
Machhindra Football Club	(Nepal) Chhiring Lopsang		G'Five
Manang Marshyangdi Club	(South Korea) Lee Tae-ho		Laxmi Hyundai
Nepal Army Club	(Nepal) Dambar Singh Gurung		
Nepal Police Club	(Nepal) Birat Krishna Shrestha		
New Road Team	(Nepal) Raju Kaji Shakya		
Ranipokhari Corner Team	(Nepal) Madhu Karki		LG
Saraswoti Youth Club	Pradip Nepal		
Swoyambhu Club	(Nepal) Bikram Lama		
United Club	(Nepal) Roshan Dangol		
Brigade Boys Club	(Nepal) Sanoj Shrestha		
Friends Club	(Nepal) Paras Chaudhary		
Jawalakhel Youth Club	(Nepal) Kishor KC		Samsung
Three Star Club	(Nepal) Megh Raj KC		Mega Bank
Koilapani Polestar Club			

== Venues ==
The league was played centrally in two venues in Kathmandu.

Nepal

Kathmandu
Dasarath Rangasala	Halchowk Stadium
Capacity: 15,000	Capacity: 3,500

== League table ==
Pos	Team	Pld	W	D	L	GF	GA	GD	Pts	Qualification or relegation
1	Nepal Police Club (C)	17	14	2	1	54	7	+47	44	Qualification for 2011–12 Nepal National League
2	Manang Marshyangdi Club	17	14	2	1	42	7	+35	44	Qualification for 2011–12 Nepal National League
3	Jawalakhel Youth Club	17	11	3	3	35	15	+20	36	Qualification for 2011–12 Nepal National League
4	Three Star Club	17	11	1	5	31	12	+19	34	Qualification for 2011–12 Nepal National League
5	Himalayan Sherpa Club	17	9	6	2	45	16	+29	33	Qualification for 2011–12 Nepal National League
6	Ranipokhari Corner Team	17	10	3	4	40	23	+17	33	Qualification for 2011–12 Nepal National League
7	New Road Team	17	9	5	3	27	15	+12	32	Qualification for 2011–12 Nepal National League
8	Nepal Army Club	17	8	5	4	35	17	+18	29	Qualification for 2011–12 Nepal National League
9	Friends Club	17	7	3	7	27	22	+5	24	
10	Bansbari Football Club	17	6	3	8	20	28	−8	21	
11	Boudha Football Club	17	5	5	7	18	27	−9	20	
12	APF Club	17	5	3	9	30	26	+4	18	
13	Saraswati Youth Club	17	4	3	10	26	40	−14	15	
14	Machhindra Football Club	17	3	5	9	20	28	−8	14	
15	Swoyambhu Club (R)	17	2	5	10	9	27	−18	11	Relegation to 2013 Martyr's Memorial B-Division League
16	Brigade Boys Club (R)	17	2	4	11	9	41	−32	10	Relegation to 2013 Martyr's Memorial B-Division League
17	United Club (R)	17	1	3	13	10	61	−51	6	Relegation to 2013 Martyr's Memorial B-Division League
18	Koilapani Polestar Club (R)	17	0	3	14	12	78	−66	3	Relegation to 2013 Martyr's Memorial B-Division League

Updated to match(es) played on 4 May 2013. Source:
Rules for classification: 1) points; 2) goal difference; 3) number of goals scored.
(C) Champions; (R) Relegated
