= Martyr's Memorial B-Division League =

- Organising body: ANFA
- Founded: 2003; 23 years ago
- Country: Nepal
- Confederation: AFC
- Number of clubs: 14
- Level on pyramid: 2
- Promotion to: Martyr's Memorial A-Division League
- Relegation to: Martyr's Memorial C-Division League
- Current champions: Planning Boyz United (2025)
- Most championships: Brigade Boys Club; Saraswati Youth Club (2 titles)
- Broadcaster(s): Prime Television
- Website: ANFA
- Current: 2025-26 B-Division League

Martyr's Memorial B-Division League (Nepali: शहीद स्मारक बी डिभिजन लीग) is the second tier of the Nepal association football league system after the Martyr's Memorial A-Division League. It was established in 2003 and is run by the All Nepal Football Association. It is currently being held at the ANFA Complex.

== Structure ==
The league is formatted as a single round-robin tournament with the top two team getting promoted to the Martyr's Memorial A-Division League and the bottom two teams relegated to the Martyr's Memorial C-Division League. This structure has not remained constant however as the league structure is changed every year by the All Nepal Football Association.

== Clubs ==
2025-26 Season clubs
Club	City	Province	Previous Season
Annapurna Club RCT	Kathmandu (New Road)	Bagmati	7th
Bagmati Youth Club	Bagmati, Sarlahi	Madhesh	1st (C-Division) 2024
Bansbari Club	Kathmandu (Maharajgunj)	Bagmati	11th
Birgunj United	Birgunj, Parsa	Madhesh	4th
Boys Union Club	Kathmandu (Tripureshwar)	Bagmati	3rd
Brigade Boys Club	Lalitpur (Manbhawan)	Bagmati	12th
Chyasal Youth Club	Lalitpur (Chyasal)	Bagmati	8th
Jhapa Football Club	Damak, Jhapa	Koshi	6th
FC Khumaltar	Lalitpur (Khumaltar)	Bagmati	14th (A-Division) 2023
Madhyapur Youth Association	Madhyapur Thimi, Bhaktapur	Bagmati	9th
RC32 Football Academy	Birendranagar, Surkhet	Karnali	2nd (C-Division) 2024
Saraswati Youth Club	Kathmandu (Tinkune)	Bagmati	5th
Shree Kumari Club	Kathmandu (Balkhu)	Bagmati	10th
Three Star Club	Lalitpur (Patan)	Bagmati	13th (A-Division) 2023

== All time clubs ==
A total of 41 clubs have participated so far in the B-Division League since its inception from 2003/4 season, up to the 2025 season. The following is a list of clubs that have played in the B- Division League at any time since its formation in 2003 to the current season. Teams playing in the next season are indicated in bold and table contains only available points (Multiple League Matches and points missing)

B-Division League
A-Division League
C-Division League
C-Division Qualifiers & Local Leagues
Defunct/Merged clubs
Operational academies
Reserve team

As of 2025

Pos.	Team	S	P	W	D	L	GF	GA	GD	Pts	1st	2nd	3rd	1st App	Last / Recent app	Highest finish
1	Tusal Youth Club	**9**	**94**	32	**28**	34	**129**	**133**	−4	**124**	0	1	0	2004	2025	2nd
2	**Bansbari Club**	8	82	30	17	**35**	114	114	0	106	0	**2**	1	2003-04	2025	3rd
3	**Madhyapur Youth Association**	7	81	**35**	19	27	104	102	2	**124**	0	**2**	0	2011	2025	2nd
4	**Boys Union Club**	7	81	31	26	24	119	111	8	119	1	0	0	2011	2025	1st
5	Pulchowk Sports Club	6	79	23	17	29	92	103	-11	86	0	0	0	2006	2020-21	4th
6	**Shree Kumari Club**	7	79	26	26	27	105	103	2	104	0	0	0	2013	2025	5th
7	Nayabasti Youth Club	6	67	18	17	32	77	114	-37	70	0	0	0	2014	2025	4th
8	Samajik Youth Club	5	64	25	12	27	87	106	-19	87	0	0	1	2011	2022	3rd
9	**Chyasal Youth Club**	5	64	26	15	23	91	76	15	93	1	0	0	2011	2025	1st
10	Mahabir Youth Club	5	58	19	8	31	82	94	-12	65	0	1	0	2003-04	2016	2st
11	**Annapurna Club RCT**	5	58	25	19	14	84	61	23	94	1	0	**2**	2016	2025	1st
12	Satdobato Youth Club	5	56	28	11	17	75	71	4	95	1	0	0	2013	2020–21	1st
13	Birgunj Youth Academy	4	46	16	19	11	55	46	9	66	0	0	**2**	2008	2014	3rd
14	**Brigade Boys Club**	5	45	25	8	12	66	41	**25**	83	**2**	0	1	2003-04	2025	1st
15	Shree Bhagwati Club	4	45	21	12	12	66	53	23	75	0	**2**	0	2019	2025	2nd
16	**Khumaltar Youth Club**	4	42	22	5	15	76	60	16	71	0	**2**	0	2016	2022	2nd
17	Kathmandu Club	3	34	8	6	20	44	63	-19	30	0	0	0	2008	2013	5th
18	Sano Gaucharan	5	31	6	7	18	38	74	-36	26	0	0	0	2003-04	2011	4th
19	Jhamsikhel Youth Club	3	29	5	7	17	24	53	−29	22	0	0	0	2019	2022	11th
20	**Saraswoti Youth Club**	5	28	10	6	12	37	44	-7	36	**2**	0	0	2004	2025	1st
21	**Birgunj United**	2	26	9	9	8	35	31	4	36	0	0	0	2022	2025	4th
22	Boudha	4	23	5	4	14	23	35	-12	19	0	1	0	2004	2020-21	2nd
23	Kumari Youth Club	2	22	4	5	13	16	39	−33	17	0	0	0	2008	2011	7th
24	Swayambhu Club	2	20	12	4	4	36	22	14	40	1	0	0	2008	2013	1st
25	United Youth	4	19	6	4	9	20	30	-10	22	0	1	0	2003-04	2013	6th
26	Star Club	2	15	8	2	5	22	19	3	26	0	0	0	2006	2011	7th
27	Boys Sports Club	2	15	2	1	12	13	30	-17	7	0	0	0	2006	2011	14th
28	Gyan Bhairab Club	1	14	3	3	8	3	11	−8	12	0	0	0	2011	2011	12th
29	Sankata BSC	1	14	9	3	2	36	18	18	30	1	0	0	2011	2011	1st
30	Planning Boyz United	1	13	10	3	0	32	7	25	33	1	0	0	2025	2025	1st
31	Church Boys United	1	13	9	2	2	31	12	19	29	1	0	0	2022	2022	1st
32	New Road Team	1	13	8	4	1	24	9	15	28	0	1	0	2016	2016	2nd
33	**Jhapa Football Club**	1	13	5	3	5	15	13	2	18	0	0	0	2025	2025	
34	Himalayan Sherpa Club	1	8	4	3	1	19	7	12	15	0	1	0	2008	2008	2nd
35	Koilapani Polestar Club	1	8	3	3	2	23	12	11	12	0	0	0	2008	2008	4th
36	Machhindra Bahal	2	7	5	0	2	12	1	11	15	1	0	1	2003-04	2004	1st
37	Friends 'B'	2	7	2	1	4	7	10	-3	7	0	0	0	2003-04	2004	5th
38	Sankata 'B'	1	7	0	1	6	1	13	-12	1	0	0	0	2003-04	2003-04	8th
39	Naxal Youth Alliance	1	—N/a	—N/a	—N/a	—N/a	—N/a	—N/a	—N/a	—N/a	—N/a	—N/a	—N/a	2004	2004	11th
40	Annapurna Club	1	—N/a	—N/a	—N/a	—N/a	—N/a	—N/a	—N/a	—N/a	—N/a	—N/a	—N/a	2004	2004	
41	Galaxy Club	1	—N/a	—N/a	—N/a	—N/a	—N/a	—N/a	—N/a	—N/a	—N/a	—N/a	—N/a	2004	2004	
42	**Three Star Club**	-	-	-	-	-	-	-	-	-	-	-	-	2025-26	-	-
43	**Bagmati Youth Club**	-	-	-	-	-	-	-	-	-	-	-	-	2025-26	-	-
44	**RC32 Football Academy**	-	-	-	-	-	-	-	-	-	-	-	-	2025-26	-	-

== Champions ==
Season	Champions	Promoted	Relegated	Top Scorer
2003–04	Brigade Boys Club	Brigade Boys Club; Mahabir Youth Club	Bansbari Club; Sankata Club 'B'	
2004	Machhindra Bahal Club	Machhindra Bahal Club; Boudha Football Club	Naxal Youth Alliance	
2005	No league held			
2006	Saraswati Youth Club	Saraswati Youth Club	No relegations	
2007	No league held			
2008 (Note: In the 2008-2009, two parallel B Division leagues were organize, one by the All Nepal Football Association, won by Swoyambhu Youth Club and one by the Nepal Football Association (NFA) won by Saraswoti Youth Club. After reconciliation, the four top teams from both leagues were promoted to 2011 Martyr's Memorial A-Division League.)	Swoyambhu Youth Club	Swoyambhu Youth Club; Himalayan Sherpa Club; Bansbari Club; Koilapani Polestar Club	No Relegations	
2008–09	Saraswoti Youth Club	Saraswoti Youth Club; United Club; Brigade Boys Club; Boudha Football Club	No Relegations	
2010	No league held			
2011	Sankata BSC	Sankata BSC; Madhyapur Youth Association	Gyanbhairab Club; Sanogaucharan Youth Club; Boys Sports Club; Kumari Youth Club	
2012	No league held			
2013	Boys Union Club	Boys Union Club	Kathmandu Club	
2014	Brigade Boys Club	Brigade Boys Club	Birgunj Youth Academy Club; Boudha Football Club	Som Thapa (10 goals)
2015	League not held due to aftermath of the 2015 Nepal earthquake			
2016	Chyasal Youth Club	Chyasal Youth Club; New Road Team	Samajik Youth Club; Mahabir Youth Club	Suraj Raut; Bhuwan Basnet (10 goals)
2017–18	No league held			
2019	Ranipokhari Corner Team	No Promotions (Note: The league did not have promotion to the Martyr's Memorial A-Division League and teams were not relegated to the Martyr's Memorial C-Division League, the bottom teams of each group (Nayabasti Youth Club and Bansbari Club) had a one point deduction in the next edition of the league.)	No Relegations	Darshan Gurung (9 goals)
2020–21	Satdobato Youth Club	Satdobato Youth Club	Pulchowk Sports Club	Sabin KC (12 goals)
2022	Church Boys United	Church Boys United; Khumaltar Youth Club	Jhamsikhel Youth Club; Samajik Youth Club	Aashish Chapagain (11 goals)
2023	No league held			
2024	No league held			
2025	Planning Boyz United	Planning Boyz United; Shree Bhagwati Club	Nayabasti Youth Club; Tushal Youth Club	Fagu Ram Tharu (14 goals)
2025–26	TBD	TBD	TBD	TBD

== See also ==
- Martyr's Memorial A-Division League
- All Nepal Football Association
