= Santosh Sahukhala =

Nepali footballer (born 1988)

Santosh Shahukhala
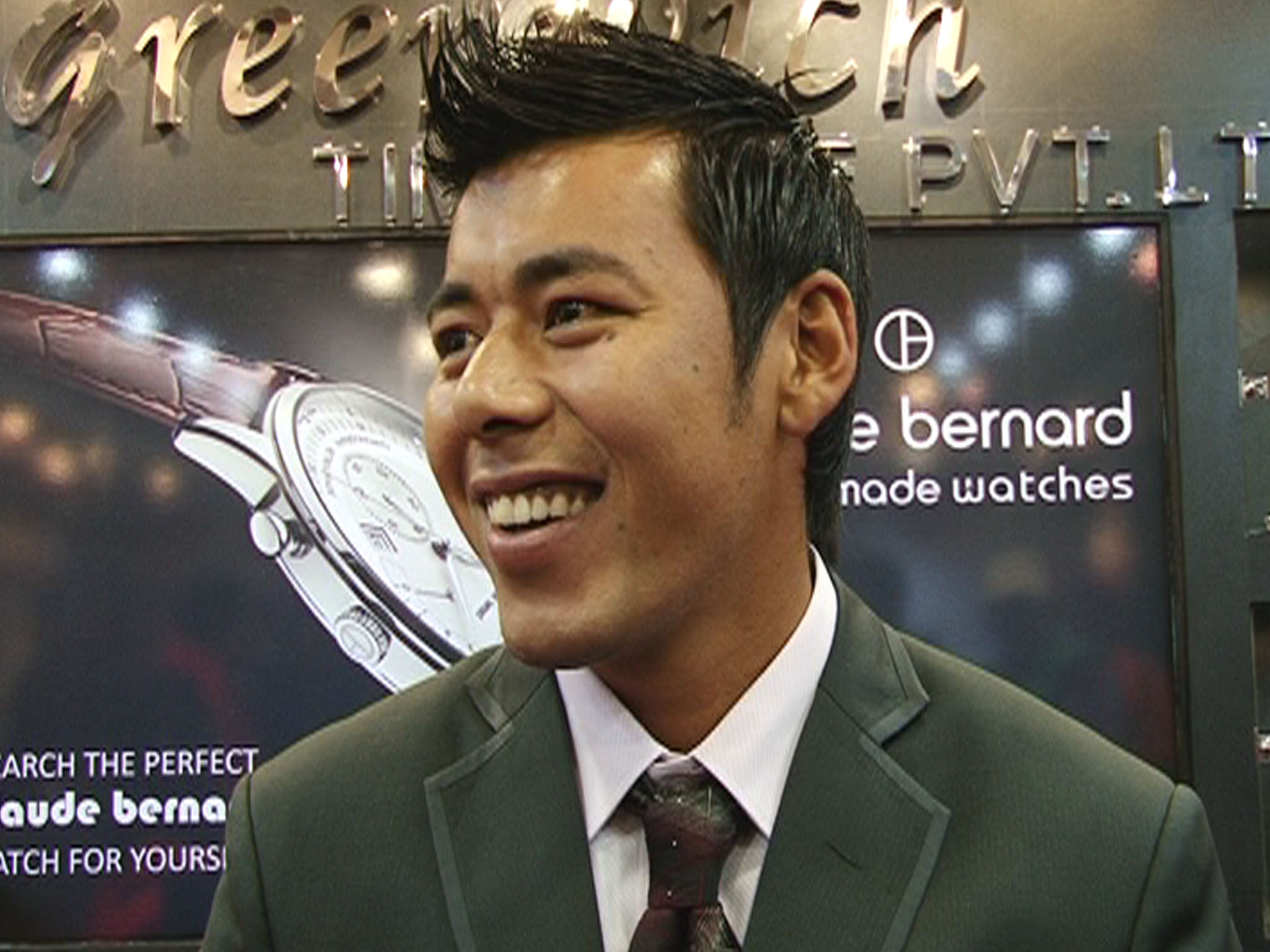
- Santosh Sahukhala in his own shop in KL Tower

Personal information
- Full name: Santosh Shahukhala
- Date of birth: 10 January 1988 (age 38)
- Place of birth: Kathmandu, Nepal
- Height: 1.69 m (5 ft 6 1/2 in)
- Position: Striker

Team information
- Current team: Three Star Club

Youth career
- 1997–2003: Madhyapur Youth Association

Senior career*
Years	Team	Apps	(Gls)
2003–2007	Three Star Club		
- APF Club
2007–2010	Abahani Chittagong		
2010–2011	Three Star Club	22	(17)
2011–2012	Manang Marshyangdi Club	17	(16)
2012	Three Star Club	11	(8)
2018	Chyasal Youth Club	5	(3)
2023	Three Star Club	1	(1)

International career
2007–	Nepal	35	(3)
- * Club domestic league appearances and goals

Santosh Sahukhala (Nepali: सन्तोष साहुखल; born 10 January 1988) is a Nepali international football forward.

== Early life ==
As a child he played at the Madhyapur Football Club. His elder brother Bal Gopal Sahukhala is also a professional footballer. He started playing football as an eight-year old and represented his school in several school-level tournaments. He had started out as a defender before his coach at Madhyapur football club changed his position to striker.

== Club career ==
=== Three Star Club ===
In 2003, he signed for Three Star Club, spending four years there.

=== Manang Marsyangdi Club ===
He signed for Manang Marsyangdi Club, becoming the highest-paid Nepali footballer at the time of his signing.

=== Trials in Indonesia ===
In 2011, Sahukhala went on trial for Sriwijaya FC, in Indonesia.

=== Trials in Japan ===
In 2014, Sahukhala went on trial for Gainare Tottori, in the Japanese third division.

=== Chyasal Youth Club ===
He returned to Nepal in the 2018–19 Martyr's Memorial A-Division League and joined A Division club Chyasal Youth Club. He played 5 matches of Martyr's Memorial A-Division League, scoring three goals. After Round 10 of the League he returned to Japan. He was given 2 yellow cards and one red card in the league. He won the "league man of the match" award in the game against the Himalayan Sherpa Club.

== International career ==
=== Disciplinary action ===
Coach Graham Roberts dropped him from the national team for the qualifiers against Timor Leste on disciplinary grounds. He was not present for practice despite calls, and had previously "violated the team norms" during the AFC Challenge Cup.

=== Reconciliation in national team ===
Santosh was picked for the next round of qualifications against Jordan and provided an assist for the home leg equalizer.

== Style of play ==
He is the main striker for Nepal's national team.

== Career statistics ==
=== Club ===
Club	Season	League			Cup			Cup (Fifa Recognized)			Total		
Club	Season	Apps	Goals	Assists	Apps	Goals	Assists	Apps	Goals	Assists	Apps	Goals	Assists
Three Star Club		?	?	?	?	?	?	?	?	?	?	?	?
APF Club		?	?	?	?	?	?	?	?	?	?	?	?
Three Star Club	2067 B.S.(2010–11)	22	17	?	?	?	?	?	?	?	?	?	?
Manang Marshyangdi Club	2068 B.S.(2011–12)	17	16	?	?	?	?	?	?	?	?	?	?
Chyasal youth club	2075 B.S. (2018)	5	4	?	?	?	?	?	?	?	?	?	?
Career Total		?	?	?	?	?	?	?	?	?	?	?	?

=== International ===
National team	Season	Apps	Goals	Assists
Nepal
Nepal	2067 B.S.(2010–11)	?	?	?
Nepal	2068 B.S.(2011–12)	?	?	?
Total		?	2	?

==== International goals ====
#	Date	Venue	Opponent	Score	Result	Competition
1.	04 August 2008	G. M. C. Balayogi Athletic Stadium, Hyderabad, India	Sri Lanka	1–0	3-0	2008 AFC Challenge Cup
2.	18 March 2011	Pokhara Rangasala, Pokhara, Nepal	Bhutan	1–0,	1–0	Friendly
3.	2 March 2013	Dasarath Rangasala Stadium, Kathmandu, Nepal	Northern Mariana Islands	2–0,	6–0	2014 AFC Challenge Cup qualification
