= Anil Gurung =

Nepali footballer (born 1986)

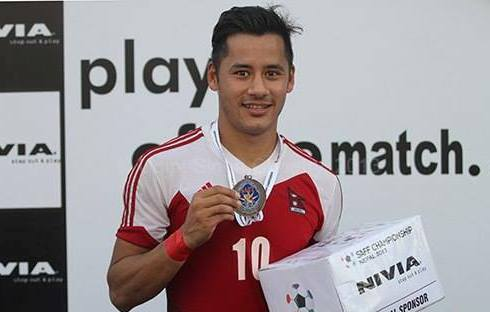
- Gurung with Nepal in 2013

Personal information
- Full name: Anil Gurung
- Date of birth: 17 September 1986 (age 40)
- Place of birth: Pokhara, Nepal
- Height: 1.68 m (5 ft 6 in)
- Position: Striker

Senior career*
Years	Team	Apps	(Gls)
2003-2004	Sahara Club	25	(12)
2004-2005	Brigade Boys Club	27	(8)
2005-2007	Three Star Club	24	(13)
2007-2008	Manang Marshyangdi	?	(32)
2008-2009	New Road Team	12	(8)
2009–2010	Shillong Lajong FC	4	(0)
2011–2018	Manang Marshyangdi		(32)
2018–2019	Three Star Club	22	(5)
2019	Brigade Boys Club	22	(1)

International career
2007–2017	Nepal	51	(10)
Medal record
Men's football
Representing Nepal
AFC Solidarity Cup
Winner	2016 Malaysia
- * Club domestic league appearances and goals

Anil Gurung (Nepali: अनिल गुरुङ; born 17 September 1986) is a Nepali professional footballer who last played as a striker for Brigade Boys Club in the Martyr's Memorial A-Division League.

He retired from the national team after the 2019 AFC Asian Cup qualification – third round match against the Philippines on 14 November 2017, which was his 50th cap for the national team.

== Early life ==
Anil Gurung was born to late Bil Bahadur Gurung and Laxmi Kumari Gurung in Malepatan, Pokhara. He completed his school education from Barahi Secondary School, and started playing football from the age of 13. He started his career from Sahara Club, Pokhara in 2001. Anil's parents believed that sports could not earn him a living and urged him to join the army. Although his family opposed him, he kept playing.

He made headlines when he was selected for a trial for Chelsea reserve team and Woking F.C in England. Sahara Club, Nepal and Sahara Football Club, UK jointly initiated the trial-selection process. Sahara Club (Pokhara), a local football Club in Pokhara, which has branches in the UK, had applied for Anil's trial. In England, Gurung went through a four-month trial, where he put his footballing skills to the test. Chelsea F.C. took care of all his footballing expenses during the trial period.

== Domestic career and achievements ==
In his domestic league, Anil previously played for Brigade Club, Three Star Club, New Road Team (NRT) and Manang Marshyangdi Club. Anil proved himself in Nepali football by scoring 32 goals and becoming the highest scorer in the 2009 edition of Martyrs Memorial A Division Football League for this achievement he won a Yamaha motorcycle . He won a cash prize of Rupees fifty thousand in one of the matches of the 10th edition of SAFF games for having an outstanding performance. In one of the matches in Itahari Gold Cup 2063 BS he was tagged as man of the match. In the 10th Buddha Subba Gold Cup, he was the highest scorer and was duly selected as the best player of the tournament. He was also chosen as best player during a match in the 2064 BS edition of Governor Gold Cup. He was selected as the best player in the yearly match organized by the Nepal Khel Khud Patrakar Manch. Likewise, in the yearly match held in Kaski district, he received a cash prize of Rs. 30,000. Thus, his career was bombarded with trophy and prizes. Due to his success, he is also regarded as one of the most successful and highly paid player of Nepal. Anil Scored first Head goal against Bangladesh on SAFF Championship held in Kathmandu August, 2013.

== Chelsea trials ==
Anil Gurung is the player from Nepal UK jointly were engaged in lobbying for his selection for the trial phase. Anil, during a farewell Programme hosted by Sahara club, Pokhara said, "Opportunities don't come very often and I am going to the make the best of it." During the event, he expressed his love for football and a dream to popularise the name of the country by football. Before leaving, Anil Gurung said, "I am very happy to represent Nepal. I don't mind if I am not selected there. It is my honor that I am called by them. I will try my best to show Nepalis' talents abroad. I also want to prove that Nepali players are capable of performing well if they are provided with opportunities". Although he didn't find success in Chelsea and Woking, he was welcomed home as a hero.

== I-League and Shillong Lajong ==
Previously, Anil was called by Shillong Lajong FC but as he had to go UK for the trial, he refused to play for that club. On October 30, 2009, Anil signed a three-year contract with Indian I-League club Shillong Lajong FC for an amount of Nrs.6.3 million. Anil made his debut for Lajong in a scoreless draw against Salgoacar SC on 2 November 2009. His contract with Lajong made him the highest paid Nepali footballer. Anil Gurung helped Lajong FC to garner a point when he scored the equalizer in the 90th minute of the match against Viva Kerala in their latest I-League encounter. In the 3rd E.K. Nayanar Memorial Gold Cup he scored the only goal to send Shillong Lajong FC into the semifinal at the expense of Pune FC. He was also in the squad of Shillong Lajong, that finished runners-up in the 2009–10 Indian Federation Cup.

== Return to Manang Marshyandi Club ==
The relegation of Shillong Lajong FC led the need for Anil Gurung to find top-tier football. He terminated the contract with the Indian outfit. It was revealed that he had joined the former club Manang Marshyandi Club for an undisclosed fee assumed to make him the highest paid player in Nepal. The club cited the need for such contract as the player is highly rated and can gain interest of several foreign league clubs. He endured a sweet return assisting and scoring in the first match against Friends Club. He scored on his second match against Machindra F.C. and another in fourth start against Koilapani Polestar. He then scored only at the end games of the season, a hat-trick against his former club Brigade Boys and the final match against Nepal Police Club. It was just an average performance by his standard to get runners-up medal.

=== 2012-13 (2069 B.S.) Season ===
The Season started brightly for Anil Gurung after being named captain for Manang Marshyandi. He led them to glory in Ncell Cup and Safal Cup.

=== 2014-15 ===
In the opening match of the 2014–15 Martyr's Memorial A-Division League Gurung captained his side and scored the third goal in MMC's 3–0 victory over Far Western FC.

== International career ==
Gurung made his international debut against Oman in a world cup qualifier that Nepal lost 2–0 on 8 October 2007 at Muscat. He has won 50 caps and has 9 goals to his name. Anil became the first Nepalese player to score goal in home ground in world-cup qualifying match. Gurung took retirement from the national team duty after the clash against the Philippines on 14 November 2017.

== Style of play ==
He is generally deployed as supporting striker with another player in the 4-4-2 formation but can act as play maker (He wears the No-10 Shirt in national team) in 3-4-3 or 4-5-1 formation just behind the lone striker. He is the preferred penalty taker. In one of his recent interview, he said Neymar was his favourite player and aims to endorse Neymar's playing style in the pitch. Despite his short height, he is well built-in player and uses low centre of gravity to the cut pass or hold players in the opposition box.

== Career statistics ==
=== Club ===
Club	Season	League			Cup			Cup (Fifa Recognized)			Total		
Club	Season	Apps	Goals	Assists	Apps	Goals	Assists	Apps	Goals	Assists	Apps	Goals	Assists
Brigade Boys Club	2003	12	8	6	8	5	4	?	?	?	?	?	?
Three Star Club	2004	?	13	?	?	?	?	?	?	?	?	?	?
Manang Marshyangdi Club	2005	?	32	?	?	?	?	?	?	?	?	?	?
New Road Team	2007	?	?	?	?	?	?	?	?	?	?	?	?
Shillong Lajong FC	2010	?	?	?	?	?	?	?	?	?	?	?	?
Manang Marshyangdi Club	2011	12	7	4	?	?	?	?	?	?	?	?	?
Three Star Club	2018	22	5										
Brigade Boys Club	2019	14											
Career Total		?	?	?	?	?	?	?	?	?	?	?	?

=== International ===
National team	Season	Apps	Goals
Nepal
Nepal	2064 B.S.(2007–08)	4	1
Nepal	2065 B.S.(2008–09)	4	1
Nepal	2066 B.S.(2009–10)	3	3
Nepal	2067 B.S.(2010–11)	4	1
Nepal	2068 B.S.(2011–12)	12	2
Nepal	2069 B.S.(2012–13)	7	0
Nepal	2070 B.S.(2013–14)	7	2
Nepal	2071 B.S.(2014–15)	3	0
Nepal	2072 B.S.(2015–16)	3	0
Nepal	2073 B.S.(2016–17)	3	0
Nepal	2074 B.S.(2017–18)	2	0
Total		51	10

==== International goals ====
Scores and results list Nepal's goal tally first.

#	Date	Venue	Opponent	Score	Result	Competition
1.	25 March 2008	Pokhara Rangasala, Pokhara	Pakistan	2–1	2–1	Friendly
2.	15 October 2008	MBPJ Stadium, Petaling Jaya	Afghanistan	1–1	2–2	2008 Merdeka Tournament
3.	29 November 2009	Mohammedan Sporting Club, Kolkata	Bhutan	1–1	2-1	Friendly
4.	10 December 2009	Bangabandhu National Stadium, Dhaka	Afghanistan	1–0	3–0	2009 SAFF Championship
5.	10 December 2009	Bangabandhu National Stadium, Dhaka	Afghanistan	3–0	3–0	2009 SAFF Championship
6.	19 March 2011	Pokhara Rangasala, Pokhara	Bhutan	2–0	2–1	Friendly
7.	29 June 2011	Dasarath Rangasala Stadium, Kathmandu	Timor-Leste	1–0	2–1	2014 FIFA World Cup qualifier
8.	2 July 2011	Dasarath Rangasala Stadium, Kathmandu	Timor-Leste	1–0	5–0	2014 FIFA World Cup qualifier
9.	31 August 2013	Dasarath Rangasala Stadium, Kathmandu	Bangladesh	1–0	2–0	2013 SAFF Championship
10.	5 September 2013	Dasarath Rangasala Stadium, Kathmandu	India	1–0	2–1	2013 SAFF Championship

==== Prominent Tournaments Played ====
Tournament	Team	Played Year
Asian Youth U-19 Champions Qualifying Competition	Nepal National Team	2004
AFC President's Cup, Nepal	Three Star Club	2005
28th All India Governor's Gold Cup, India	Three Star Club	2005
10th SAF Games, Sri Lanka	Nepal National Team	2006
SAFF Championship, Bangladesh	Nepal National Team	2006
AFC President's Cup, Malaysia	Manang Marshyangdi Club	2006
World Cup Qualification Round, Oman	Nepal National Team	2007
World Cup Qualification Round, Nepal	Nepal National Team	2007
Friendly Match (Nepal vs Pakistan), Nepal	Nepal National Team	2007
30th All India Governor's Gold Cup, India	New Road Team	2007
Murdega Cup Football, Malaysia		2008
1st Prime Minister Cup, Nepal		2009
AFC Challenge Cup Qualification, Nepal	Nepal National Team	2009
Trial Match in Woking FC, UK	Woking FC	2009
Trial Match in Chelsea FC	Chelsea FC	2009
11th SAG, Bangladesh	Nepal National Team	2010
AFC Challenge Cup, Bangladesh	Nepal National Team	2010
Trial Match in Farnborough FC	Farnborough FC	2010
FIFA Friendly Match (Nepal vs Bhutan), Nepal	Nepal National Team	2011
FIFA Friendly Match (Nepal vs Bhutan), Nepal	Nepal National Team	2011
AFC Challenge Cup, Nepal	Nepal National Team	2011
FIFA World Cup Asian Qualifiers, Jordan & Nepal	Nepal National Team	2011
FIFA Friendly Match (Nepal vs Philippines), Philippines	Nepal National Team	2011
SAFF Championship, India	Nepal National Team	2011
Neheru Cup, India	Nepal National Team	2012
AFC Challenge Cup Final, Nepal	Nepal National Team	2012
FIFA Friendly Match (Nepal vs Bangladesh), Nepal	Nepal National Team	2013
FIFA Friendly Match (Nepal vs Pakistan), Nepal	Nepal National Team	2013
SAFF Championship, India	Nepal National Team	2013
AFC Challenge Cup, Nepal	Nepal National Team	2013
FIFA Friendly Match (Nepal vs East Riffa FC), Bahrain	Nepal National Team	2013
FIFA Friendly Match (Nepal vs Al-Arabi SC), Qatar	Nepal National Team	2013
FIFA Friendly Match (Nepal vs Al-Fahaheel FC), Kuwait	Nepal National Team	2013
SAFF Championship, Nepal	Nepal National Team	2013
FIFA Friendly Match (Nepal vs India), India	Nepal National Team	2014
FIFA Friendly Match (Nepal vs Yemen), Qatar	Nepal National Team	2014
FIFA Friendly Match (Nepal vs Philippians), Qatar	Nepal National Team	2014
FIFA Friendly Match (Nepal vs Indonesia), Indonesia	Nepal National Team	2014
FIFA Friendly Match (Nepal vs Philippines), Qatar	Nepal National Team	2014
2018 FIFA World Cup Qualification (Nepal vs India), India	Nepal National Team	2015
2018 FIFA World Cup Qualification (Nepal vs India), Nepal	Nepal National Team	2015
FIFA Friendly Match (Nepal vs India), India	Nepal National Team	2015
FIFA Friendly Match (Nepal vs Bangladesh), Bangladesh	Nepal National Team	2015
2015 SAFF Championship (Nepal vs Sri Lanka), India	Nepal National Team	2015
2015 SAFF Championship (Nepal vs India), India	Nepal National Team	2015
FIFA Friendly Match (Nepal vs Laos), Laos	Nepal National Team	2016
2016 Solidarity Cup (Nepal vs Timor-Leste), Malaysia	Nepal National Team	2016
2016 Solidarity Cup (Nepal vs Brunei), Malaysia	Nepal National Team	2016
2016 Solidarity Cup (Nepal vs Laos), Malaysia	Nepal National Team	2016
2016 Solidarity Cup (Nepal vs Macau), Malaysia	Nepal National Team	2016
Friendly Match (Nepal vs Friends of Japan), Nepal	Nepal National Team	2016
Friendly Match (Nepal vs India), India	Nepal National Team	2017
2019 AFC Asian Cup qualification – third round (Nepal vs Yemen)	Nepal National Team	2017
2019 AFC Asian Cup qualification – third round (Nepal vs Philippines), Nepal	Nepal National Team	2017

==== Achievements ====
- In the year 2003, he participated in the competition Sahid Smarak League from Manang Marshayandi Club and was able to bag a grand prize of Rs 1,00,000 for the highest goal scorer of the tournament.
- In the year 2006, he scored 32 goals in Martyrs' Memorial 'A' Division League where he bagged Yamaha Motorcycle as a highest goal scorer of the tournament award.
- In the year 2013, he won NCELL Player of the year award where he bagged Hyundai EON.
- In the year 2014, he was adjudged Most Valuable Player of First Khaptad Gold Cup Football Tournament where he bagged Yamaha Motorcycle.
- In the year 2016, he was adjudged Most Valuable Player of Manakama Cable Car Gold Cup Football Tournament where he bagged Yamaha Motorcycle.

=== International ===
- First Prime Minister Cup
  - Winner: 2009
- AFC Solidarity Cup
  - Winner: 2016
