= Brigade Boys Club =

Brigade Boys
- Full name: Brigade Boys Club
- Nickname: The Brigade
- Founded: 1987; 39 years ago
- Ground: Dasarath Rangasala Stadium, Kathmandu
- Capacity: 15,000
- Manager: Sanoj Shrestha
- League: Martyr's Memorial B-Division League
- 2025: 11th of 14

Brigade Boys Club is a Nepalese professional football club from Lalitpur, which plays in Kathmandu. Founded in 1987, the club competes in the Martyr's Memorial B-Division League, the second division of Nepalese football.

== Squad (2021) ==
Note: Flags indicate national team as defined under FIFA eligibility rules; some limited exceptions apply. Players may hold more than one non-FIFA nationality.

No.	Pos.	Nation	Player
—	GK	NEP	Purna Chemjong
—	GK	NEP	Anjal Shrestha
—	DF	NEP	Bishal Basnet
—	DF	NEP	Diwakar Chaudhary
—	DF	NEP	Ramesh Rajbanshi
—	DF	CMR	Ebode Ottou Bertrand
—	DF	NEP	Randip Paudel
—	DF	NEP	Suraj Gurung
—	DF	NEP	Anjal Maharjan
—	DF	NEP	Dipenk Raj Singh

No.	Pos.	Nation	Player
—	DF	NEP	Dipesh Gurung
—	DF	NEP	Manoj Rai
—	MF	CMR	Ruddy Mbakop
—	MF	CMR	Daddy Wamba Jr.
—	MF	NEP	Sishir Lekhi
—	MF	NEP	Dorje Tamang
—	MF	NEP	Roshan Rana Magar
—	MF	NEP	Mohan Limbu
—	FW	NEP	Brijesh Chaudhary
—	FW	NEP	Anil Gurung (captain)
