= Ranipokhari Corner Team =

- Full name: Ranipokhari Corner Team
- Nickname: R.C.T.
- Founded: B.S. 1989 A.D. 1932
- Ground: Dasarath Rangasala Stadium, Kathmandu, Nepal
- Capacity: 25,000
- League: Martyr's Memorial B-Division League
- 2025: 6th
- Website: www.annapurnarct.com

Ranipokhari Corner Team, also known as Annapurna Club R.C.T. (after merge with Annapurna Club), is a Nepalese football club based in Kathmandu. It is the first-most successful team in the history of the Martyr's Memorial A-Division League, having won the title six times. In 2013–14, facing serious financial problems, the team was relegated from the Nepalese top division, the Nepal A- Division League.

Founded in 1932, the club is the oldest football club in Nepal.

The club was named after its location at the corner of Ranipokhari of Kathmandu.

== Honours ==
=== National ===
- Martyr's Memorial A-Division League:
  - Champions: 1971–72, 1972–73, 1973–74, 1979, 1981–82, 1984
- Martyr's Memorial B-Division League :
  - Champions: 2019
- Water Boy Memorial Cup
  - Champion: Yamba Subba 2009

=== Invitational ===
- Budha Subba Gold Cup:
  - Champions: 2010
- Khukuri Gold Cup:
  - Champions: 1998

== League finishes ==
The season-by-season performance of RCT since 2000:

Champions	Runners-up	Third place	Promoted	Relegated

Season	League	Position
2000	Martyr's Memorial A-Division League	2nd
2001–2002	League not held	
2003	Martyr's Memorial A-Division League	8th
2004	Martyr's Memorial A-Division League	10th
2005–2006	Martyr's Memorial A-Division League	7th
2006–2007	Martyr's Memorial A-Division League	10th
2008–2009	League not held due to conflicts between ANFA and the clubs	
2010	Martyr's Memorial A-Division League	9th
2011	Martyr's Memorial A-Division League	6th
2011–12	Nepal National League	7th
2012-13	Martyr's Memorial A-Division League	8th
2013-14	Martyr's Memorial A-Division League	12th
2016	Martyr's Memorial B-Division League	3rd
2017-18	No league held	
2019	Martyr's Memorial B-Division League	1st (no promotion this season)
2020–21	Martyr's Memorial B-Division League	9th
2022	Martyr's Memorial B-Division League	3rd
2025	Martyr's Memorial B-Division League	6th

== Performance in AFC competitions ==
- Asian Club Championship: 1 appearance

1991: Qualifying stage
