= Football in Nepal =

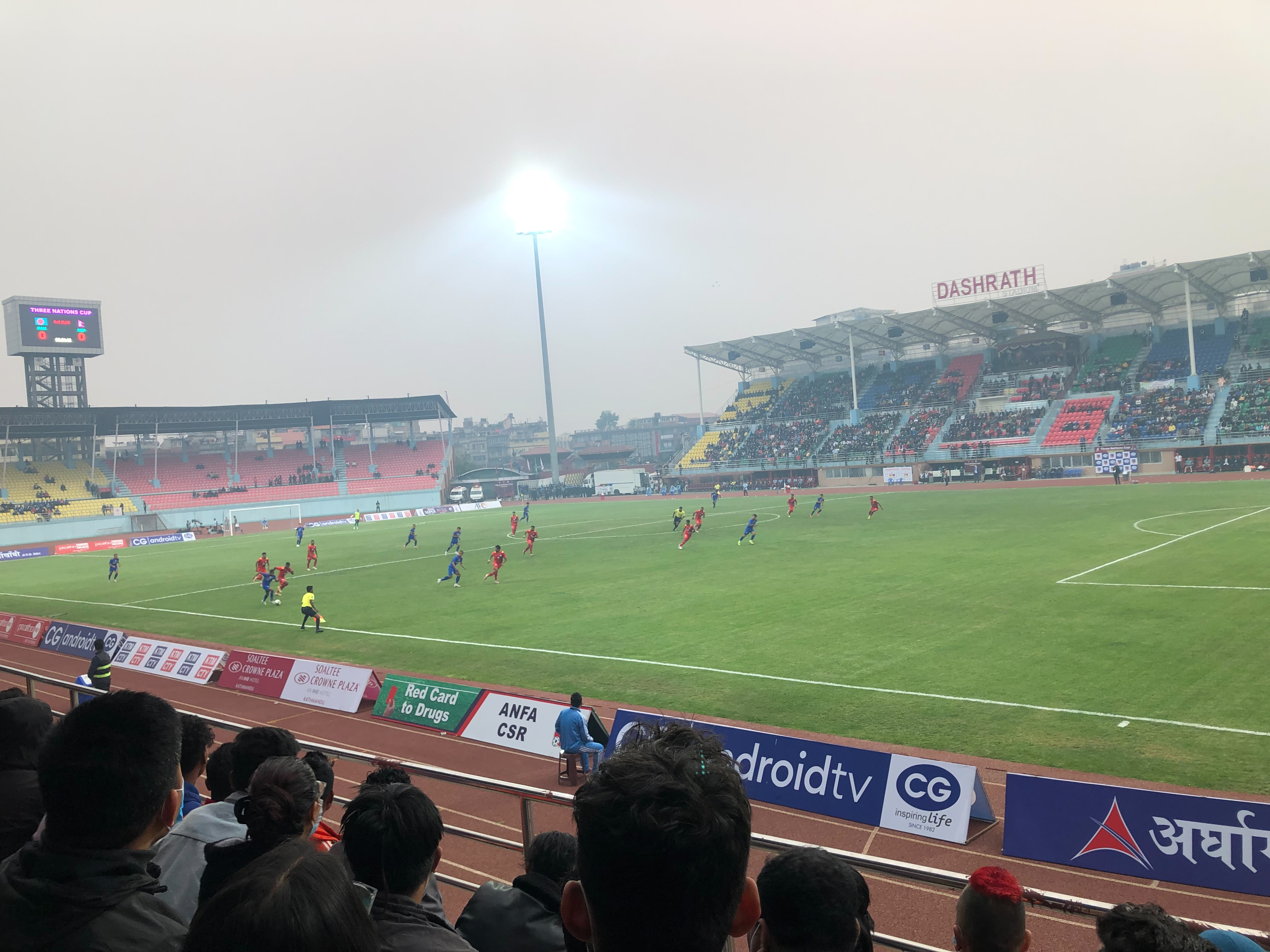
- Country: Nepal
- Governing body: All Nepal Football Association
- National teams: Men's; Women's
- Nickname: The Gorkhalis
- First played: 1972

Club competitions
- List: Leagues: Men's; Martyr's Memorial A Division league (1st Division); Nepal National League (sometimes); Martyr's Memorial B-Division League (2nd Division); Martyr's Memorial C-Division League (3rd Division); ANFA League Cup (formerly); ANFA Cup; Nepal Super League (franchise league); National Futsal League; Women's; ANFA Women's League

International competitions
- List: Clubs; AFC Challenge League; SAFF Club Championship; AFC Women's Champions League; SAFF Club Women's Championship; National team; Asian Games: Group Stage (1982, 1986); SAFF Championship: Semi-Finals (1993, 2011, 2013, 2018); South Asian Games: Runners–up (2004, 2016); Defunct; AFC Challenge Cup: Semi-finals (2006); AFC Solidarity Cup: Champions (2016); National U-23 team; Asian Games: Group Stage (2014, 2018); South Asian Games: Champions (2016, 2019); National U-20 team; AFC U-20 Asian Cup: Group Stage (2000, 2006, 2014); SAFF U-20 Championship: Champions (2019, 2017); National U-17 team; AFC U-17 Asian Cup: Group Stage (1971, 1972, 1974, 2004); SAFF U-17 Championship: Runners-up (2013, 2017, 2019, 2022); Women's national team; SAFF Women's Championship: Runners-up (2010, 2012, 2014, 2016, 2019); South Asian Games: Runners-up (2010, 2016, 2019); WAFF Women's Championship: Runners-up (2024); Women's U-20 national team; AFC U-20 Women's Asian Cup: Group Stage (2004); SAFF U-20 Women's Championship: Runners-up (2018); Women's U-17 national team; SAFF U-17 Women's Championship: Champions (2022)

Football is the most popular sport in Nepal. Approximately a quarter of the population is considered as football fans. It is governed by the All Nepal Football Association (ANFA), which oversees the men's and women's national teams as well as domestic club competitions. The present president of ANFA is Pankaj Bikram Nembang. The current top domestic league is the Martyr's Memorial A Division league. The Nepal national football team represents Nepal in all international competitions.

The 49 district-level FAs, various corporations and local government bodies provide most of the assistance that comes ANFA's way, helping Nepalese football's governing body to organise nationwide tournaments all year round for senior clubs and different age groups, thereby maintaining football's position as the number one sport. ANFA introduced an annual football calendar, with tournaments for the first division clubs, as well as for the U-19, U-17 and U-14 youth teams. The number of football tournaments in Nepal has always surpassed the number of events for other sports. For the 2003–2004 season, ANFA organised 24 tournaments across the country and prepared the national and youth teams that took part in the World Cup qualifying matches and the Asian Youth Championship. In this season's final tournament, 425 clubs, mostly amateur, participated in the Khukuri Cup at district, regional and senior level. Almost 8,000 players, half of whom were registered, played in the nationwide tournament in the space of two.

Nepal has been a major participant in South Asian competitions. However, at the Asian football level, Nepal has been a much weaker and less successful national team, having never qualified for the AFC Asian Cup or the FIFA World Cup.

== History ==
Football in Nepal had been a national sport as early as 1921 during the Rana dynasty. Several clubs were formed and several domestic tournaments such as the Ram Janaki Cup (1934) were organized.

The entry and initial start up of football in Nepal was during the Rana dynasty in 1921. The game was introduced in Nepal by young players who had learnt it from other countries. This game was watched by a huge audience and became very famous at that time. However, it is believed that the pioneer of this game in Nepal was Narayan Narshingh Rana of Thamel and Chandrajung Thapa of Naxal. There were some places, which were used as football ground for palace teams, such as Sujan Khanal and Mrigendra Shamsher Niwas Babar Mahal, Mahabir Niwas Tangal Durbar, Nar Shumsher Niwas Singha Durbar, Rudra Shamsher Niwas Bahadur Bhawan, and Thamel Narsingh camp. Whereas in the decade of 30s, both local and palace teams commonly used the grounds of Singh Darbar, Chhauni, Gaucharan, Jawalakhel and Lainchaur for playing football. Despite political instability at that time football was played enthusiastically during 1921 to 1990 by various teams often without a goal post, but the criterion was that the opponent team could follow the ball to the goal line. Sometimes, they used to play football on the bet of 100/200-castrated goat.

The teams like Mahabir-11, N R T-11, Jawalakhel-11, Public Institute-11 etc. were established in 1934. The football tournament was organized for the first time in an institutional way in 1934, in which 12 teams participated. In that tournament, the team of Jawalakhel club led by Nar Shumsher had secured first position. At that time, the chief of Public team Najarman Singh told that his team had got support and encouragement from Trichandra campus and audience.

Although that tournament was a grand success, due to various reasons the government decreed to ban the game but yet it was played inside and outside the palace in secret way. The game was played enthusiastically due to which the number of participants increased drastically and hence complaints about banning the game were sent to the palace. The advisor Rishikesh Shaha had advised that the organization should solve the problem of game themselves, which was very popular western democratic tradition. Shri 3 Padma Shumsher decreed to follow it and accordingly a football committee was formed under the president of Madan Shumsher JBR at first time in 1947 and members were Basant Shamsher and Mrigendra Shumsher.

In 1947, Tribhuvan Challenge Shield was introduced by late King Tribhuvan for the development of this football game which was organized at Tudikhel in front of Haribhavan. In that tournament Naresh-11 team led by Nar Shumsher secured first position and N. R. T. team secured second position. In the same year Maharaja Prime Minister Padma Shumsher Jang Bahadur Rana introduced "Ramjanaki cup" which was continuously won thrice by Police Force team. The same cup was again introduced but was renamed as Marty's Memorial League football and hence League matches were introduced in Nepal.

In the year 1947, nationwide rebellion for Democracy started which led to a break in football for quite a time but after the success of the tournament the interest of public in football was again the same. Thus for establishing football in an organized way in Nepal, football association was established in the year 1951 The first chairman of the association was General Nar Shumsher J. B. R. Similarly, the secretary Dr. Trailokya Nath Upreti and Janaki Prasad were elected as treasurer. This football association used to organize football in a regular way in front of Billiard Hall of Singh Durbar in ground making Parafeet.

In the year 1951, Tribhuvan Challenge Shield knock-out football tournament was organized in which the team of Jaleshwor-11 won the shield. Police force team secured 1st position and N. R. T. second in the Marty's Memorial League tournament organized in the same year. Balsakha Dal introduced a new shield called Devi Maya Memorial Shield in the year 1952 and in 1953 Sankata Boys Sports team won the shield. Other tournaments of football were played in Singh Durbar itself up to the year 1953 Although the construction of Dasarath Stadium had started just before the coronation of King Mahendra but a football match was played there, too, on the occasion of coronation of King Mahendra.

After the construction of Dasarath Stadium football matches were played there regularly since 1959. In the year 1959 a memorable event of a football match between the teams King-11 and Prime Minister-11 which was charity match held at Dasarath Stadium. In that match Late King Mahendra had played in the team King-11 and the then first elected Prime Minister B. P. Koirala played for the Prime minister-11 team. Similarly from the year 1961, Mahendra Goldcup football tournament has been being organized in Biratnagar.

After that, from the year 1968 Nar Trophy Football tournament was introduced on the name of the president of Nepal Football Association Mr. Mar Shumsher Rana with the view of respecting him who had contributed a lot in the development of football game. In order to respect the player who contributed to develop the standard of football the title of Best player was introduced in 1968 by football association and the Best Player was awarded with a gold medal. The title of Best Player and the gold medal were won by Baburam Pun whereas in 1978 Ganesh Thapa got the same. Similarly in the year 1981 and 1982 Rupak Raj Sharma and Suresh Panthi got the title and the medal respectively. Hence, total four players got the title of Best Player and the gold medal.

Due to various reasons, football game was not organized in a regular manner at that time and hence the Football association was re-established by National Games association in 1973 and Federation of Nepal football association was established. First of all, the Federation of Nepal Football Association had been continuing the League-cum Knockout Birthday Anniversary Football Tournament on the occasion of birthday of H. M. King since 1973 and other tournaments also in regular and organized way.

Although Nepal had been playing football with the teams of various neighboring countries and friendly countries but the necessity to invite countries for competitive matches in Nepal was realized only in 1979 and hence ANFA cup football match was introduced. In the first match of ANFA cup Kathmandu-11 team was the winner which was held in Chaitra. In order to encourage young players Federation of Nepal Football Association started ANFA President shield in the year 1981 in which Three Star club secured the first position.

The year 1982 was even more important for the development of football. In that year 23rd Asian youth football tournament (group 1) was organized for the first time in Nepal in which the teams of Nepal, India, Iran, Iraq, Saudi Arab, Oman, Bahrain, Yemen A. R., Pakistan, Kuwait, United Arab Emirates, Yemen P. D. R. and Syria had participated. Hence, there were altogether 13 different participating countries.

With the view of promoting football throughout the country, A.N.F. Association started organizing football matches from 1982 in four development regions in next year. With the view of developing the standard of football it was realized that training about football game was needed and hence a training program was organized in 1982 from 17th Bhadra to 29th Bhadra named International Olympic Sole Directive football training. In this training 25 students were trained by the trainers of FIFA. In the year 2003, for the first time Women's football tournament was organized from 5th Bhadra to 11th Bhadra.

In 1970, Nepal became a member of FIFA. And hence football in Nepal can be divided into three stages. The first stage was from 1977 to 1983 when football was first introduced to Nepal and was played for entertainment. The second stage was from 1947 to 1973, which was regarded as a revolutionary stage in the history of football in Nepal. And the third stage is regarded from the year 1973 till now when the sport has been improved, modernized, commercialized and even Nepali players have been able to occupy a place in International football standards.

== National teams ==
National teams of Nepal
Football (Men's)	Football (Women's)	Football U-23 (men's) (Olympic team)	Football U-20 (men's)
Football U-17 (men's)	Football U-20 (women's)	Football U-17 (women's)	Futsal (men's)
Futsal (women's)	Beach soccer (men's)	Esports

The Nepal national football team is governed by the All Nepal Football Association (ANFA) and is a member of the Asian Football Confederation (AFC). Since 1972, the ANFA has been affiliated with FIFA, the international governing body for world football. In 1954, the ANFA became one of the founding members of the AFC. ANFA also became member of SAFF in 1997. There are other Nepalese national teams, such as the under-23 team, under-20 team and the under-17 team.

== Province associations and leagues ==
There are currently 7 province football associations, 3 affiliated with the ANFA.

No.	Association	Province	President
1	Bagmati Province Football Association	Bagmati	Rajendra Kumar Shrestha
2	Gandaki Province Football Association	Gandaki	Dipendra Shrestha
3	Karnali Province Football Association	Karnali	Pramod Hamal
4	Koshi Province Football Association	Koshi	Kishor Rai
5	Lumbini Province Football Association	Lumbini	Bhupendra Bikram Thapa
6	Madhesh Province Football Association	Madhesh	Nepal Karki
7	Sudurpashchim Province Football Association	Sudurpashchim	Dinesh Kumar Shrestha

=== Affiliate members ===
No.	Association	Department	President
1	APF Club	Armed Police Force	SSP Bikash Ghimire
2	Tribhuvan Army Club	Nepal Army	COAS Prabhu Ram Sharma
3	Nepal Police Club	Nepal Police	—N/a

== Domestic competitions ==
=== Men's champions overview ===
State competition
Tournament	Current champions	Edition
National Games (Men)	APF	2022

Club competition
Tournament	Current champions	Edition
Nepal National League	TBD	2026
Nepal Super League	Lalitpur City	2025
A Division League	Church Boys United	2023
B Division League	Planning Boyz United	2025
C Division League	Bagmati Youth Club	2024
ANFA U-18 League (Lalit Memorial)	Nepal Police U18	2024
ANFA U-16 League	Church Boys United U16	2024-25
A-Division Football League	Sports Castle Pokhara	2021

=== Women's champions overview ===
State competition
Tournament	Current champions	Edition
National Games (Women)	APF	2022

Club competition
Tournament	Current champions	Edition
ANFA Women's League	APF	2025

=== Qualification for Asian competitions ===
Competition	Qualifying team	Notes
AFC Challenge League	Winners of A-Division League	Qualification to the Qualifying play-off
AFC Women's Champions League	Champions of ANFA Women's League	Qualification to the Preliminary stage

== Major football stadiums ==
#	Image	Stadium	Location	Current Capacity	Tenants	Year built	Ref.
1		Pokhara Rangasala	Pokhara, Gandaki	16,500	Nepal national football team and Pokhara Thunders	2004	
2		Dasharath Rangasala	Kathmandu, Bagmati	15,000	Boys Union Club, Brigade Boys Club, Himalayan Sherpa Club, Kathmandu Rayzrs FC, Machhindra FC and NRT	1956	
3		Narayani Stadium	Birgunj, Madhesh	15,000	FC Chitwan	1981	
4		Sahid Rangasala	Biratnagar, Koshi	15,000	Biratnagar City FC and Morang XI	1969	
5		Karnali Province Stadium	Surkhet, Karnali	12,500		2021	
6		Nepalgunj Stadium	Nepalgunj, Lumbini	10,000			
7		Dhangadhi Stadium	Dhangadhi, Sudurpashchim	10,000	Dhangadhi FC		

== Attendances ==
The average attendance per top-flight football league season and the club with the highest average attendance:

Season	League average	Best club	Best club average
2023	2,648	Dhangadhi FC	4,803

== See also ==
- Nepal women's national football team
- Nepal National League
