= 2026 SAFF U-20 Championship squads =

Squads for football competition in Maldives

The following squads were announced for the 2026 SAFF U-20 Championship, organized by the South Asian Football Federation (SAFF). The tournament is scheduled to be held in Maldives.

Each team is permitted to register a maximum of 23 players for the tournament.

== Squads ==
=== Bangladesh ===
The Bangladesh U20 Men's National Team named their final squad on 20 March 2026.

Head coach: (England) Mark Edward Cox

Note: Flags indicate national team as defined under FIFA eligibility rules; some limited exceptions apply. Players may hold more than one non-FIFA nationality.

No.	Pos.	Nation	Player
1	GK	BAN	Md Ismail Hossain
2	DF	BAN	Md Mithu Chowdhury (Captain)
3	DF	BAN	Ihsan Habib Riduan
4	DF	BAN	Md Kamal Merdha
5	MF	BAN	Chandon Roy
6	MF	BAN	Md Manik
7	MF	BAN	Nazmul Huda Faysal
8	FW	BAN	Md Mursed Ali
9	FW	BAN	Ronan Sullivan
10	DF	BAN	Sheikh Sangram
11	MF	BAN	Md Yusuf Ali
12	DF	BAN	Sani Das

No.	Pos.	Nation	Player
13	DF	BAN	Ashikur Rahman
14	MF	BAN	Sree Sumon
15	GK	BAN	SP Rafiz
16	MF	BAN	Md Abdul Riyad
17	FW	BAN	Md Joy Ahamed
18	FW	BAN	Samuel Raksam
19	DF	BAN	Moltagim Alam
20	MF	BAN	Md Rifat Kazi
21	MF	BAN	Ibrahim Hasib
22	FW	BAN	Declan Sullivan
23	GK	BAN	Md Nahidul Islam

=== Pakistan ===
Pakistan's squad was announced on 20 March 2026.

Head coach: (Pakistan) Shahzad Anwar

Note: Flags indicate national team as defined under FIFA eligibility rules; some limited exceptions apply. Players may hold more than one non-FIFA nationality.

No.	Pos.	Nation	Player
1	GK	PAK	Kashif
2	DF	PAK	Ali Zafar (Captain)
3	DF	PAK	Zarib Haider
4	DF	PAK	Zain Imran
5	MF	PAK	Muhammad Junaid
6	FW	PAK	Abdul Samad
7	MF	PAK	Mansoor Ahmad
8	FW	PAK	Najeeb Ullah
9	DF	PAK	Khobaib Khan
10	MF	PAK	Sheraz Khalid
11	MF	PAK	Abdul Rehman
12	GK	PAK	Zulqurnain

No.	Pos.	Nation	Player
13	DF	PAK	Abdul Khaliq
14	DF	PAK	Ubaid Ullah Khan
15	MF	PAK	Muhammad Shahab
16	MF	PAK	SMA Raza Kazmi
17	FW	PAK	Owais Ilyas
18	DF	PAK	Umar Javed
19	FW	PAK	Sajjad Hussain
20	DF	PAK	Majid Ali
21	MF	PAK	Faham Ahmad
22	GK	PAK	Aadil Ali Khan
23	FW	PAK	Muhammad Abdullah

=== Maldives ===
Maldives named their final squad on 22 March 2026.

Head coach: (Hungary) István Urbányi

Note: Flags indicate national team as defined under FIFA eligibility rules; some limited exceptions apply. Players may hold more than one non-FIFA nationality.

No.	Pos.	Nation	Player
1	GK	MDV	Xahran Hassan Ziyad
2	DF	MDV	Mohamed Laamih Imthiyaz
3	DF	MDV	Mohamed Joodh Ismail
4	DF	MDV	Alhaan Faisal Ameen
5	DF	MDV	Mohamed Naisam Nadheem
6	MF	MDV	Ahmed Akmal Nizam
7	MF	MDV	Nashiu Ahmed Shiham
8	MF	MDV	Ahzam Rasheed
9	FW	MDV	Mohamed Ilan Imran
10	FW	MDV	Ethan Ibrahim Zaki
11	FW	MDV	Nassah Ibrahim Nasir
12	GK	MDV	Anoof Abdulla

No.	Pos.	Nation	Player
13	MF	MDV	Ahmed Mikyal Mueen
14	MF	MDV	Eydhan Ahmed Moosa
15	DF	MDV	Ali Haizoom Hassaan
16	DF	MDV	Ahmed Afnan Ali
17	FW	MDV	Mohamed Shamhaan
18	FW	MDV	Shaiman Rashaad Rashaad
19	MF	MDV	Aidh Mohamed Jaweez
20	FW	MDV	Hassan Gais Mohamed
21	MF	MDV	Ahmed Hamees Areef
22	GK	MDV	Mohamed Maail Moosa
23	FW	MDV	Yoosuf Ayaan Amir

=== Nepal ===
Nepal's squad was announced on 3 March 2026.

Head coach: (Nepal) Urjan Shrestha

Note: Flags indicate national team as defined under FIFA eligibility rules; some limited exceptions apply. Players may hold more than one non-FIFA nationality.

No.	Pos.	Nation	Player
1	GK	NEP	Sujan Basnet
2	DF	NEP	Rohan Moktan
3	DF	NEP	Siddhant Khadka
4	DF	NEP	Binayak Tharu
5	DF	NEP	Rohsan Tamang
6	MF	NEP	Prashant Moktan
7	MF	NEP	Sabin Kumar Lungeli Magar
8	FW	NEP	John Bista
9	FW	NEP	Sujan Dangol
10	FW	NEP	Subash Bam
11	FW	NEP	Bigyan Khadka
12	MF	NEP	Ganesh Pulami Magar

No.	Pos.	Nation	Player
13	MF	NEP	Pawan Pakhrin
14	DF	NEP	Dharbendra Kunwar (Captain)
15	MF	NEP	Bijaya Uranw
16	FW	NEP	Bhakta Bahadur Pariyar
17	GK	NEP	Anubhab Puri
18	MF	NEP	Prasun Tamang
19	MF	NEP	Ranjit Lama
20	GK	NEP	Pemba Nurbu Bhote
21	MF	NEP	Alik Shrestha
22	FW	NEP	Sabin Rai
23	GK	NEP	Nishan Raj Lawat

=== Sri Lanka ===
Sri Lanka's squad was announced on 22 March 2026.

Head coach: (Qatar) Ahmed Al-Mannai

Note: Flags indicate national team as defined under FIFA eligibility rules; some limited exceptions apply. Players may hold more than one non-FIFA nationality.

No.	Pos.	Nation	Player
1	GK	SRI	M. K. Shaathin Shaheed
2	DF	SRI	M. F. Mohamed Fariq
3	DF	SRI	M. F. Halik Ahamed
4	DF	SRI	Omith Edirisinghe
5	DF	SRI	K. Savindu P. K
6	MF	SRI	М. М. Ahamed Hijaazy
7	MF	SRI	L. Rashad Shihab
8	MF	SRI	M. I. Mohamed Zaid
9	FW	SRI	Sevin L. Pathirana
10	FW	SRI	K. Mohamed Katheem
11	FW	SRI	M. Hussain Abdullah
12	GK	SRI	T. S. Muhammad Yasir

No.	Pos.	Nation	Player
13	MF	SRI	M. F. Nazmi Ahamed
14	MF	SRI	M. S. Mohamed Maziyad
15	DF	SRI	M.A. Haadhim Ahamed
16	MF	SRI	K. Anupa Pabasara
17	FW	SRI	M. A. Haathim Ahamed
18	FW	SRI	M. I. Mohamed Rishad
19	MF	SRI	W. Ahmed Aamish
20	DF	SRI	Aidan F. Perera
21	FW	SRI	Zakariyya Zafarullah
22	GK	SRI	Soono A. Malik
23	FW	SRI	Nadal A. Senapala

=== Bhutan ===
Bhutan named their final squad on 21 March 2026.

Head coach: (Bhutan) Karama Dema

Note: Flags indicate national team as defined under FIFA eligibility rules; some limited exceptions apply. Players may hold more than one non-FIFA nationality.

No.	Pos.	Nation	Player
1	GK	BHU	Sherab Dorji
2	DF	BHU	Kinga Wangchuk
3	DF	BHU	Chogyek S. Sherab
4	DF	BHU	Ugyen Dorji
5	DF	BHU	Ngawang Yonten
6	MF	BHU	Kuenzang Dupthop
7	MF	BHU	Rinzin Dorji (Captain)
8	MF	BHU	Tashi Gyeltshen
9	FW	BHU	Arpan Gurung
10	FW	BHU	Sonam Dorji
11	FW	BHU	Tandin Phuntsho
12	GK	BHU	Tandin Tshewang

No.	Pos.	Nation	Player
13	MF	BHU	Namdak Yudruk
14	MF	BHU	Deychog Drakar
15	DF	BHU	Dhendup Gyeltshen
16	MF	BHU	Sidhanth Basnet
17	FW	BHU	Kuenzang Rigzin
18	FW	BHU	Kelden Dorjee
19	MF	BHU	Thinley Yezer
20	DF	BHU	Tshendu Jatsho
21	GK	BHU	Tandin Penjor
22	FW	BHU	Kiney Penjor
23	FW	BHU	Tenzin Wangchuk

=== India ===
India's final 23-member squad was announced on 23 March 2026.

Head coach: (India) Mahesh Gawli

Note: Flags indicate national team as defined under FIFA eligibility rules; some limited exceptions apply. Players may hold more than one non-FIFA nationality.

No.	Pos.	Nation	Player
1	GK	IND	Suraj Singh (Captain)
2	DF	IND	Jodric Abranches
3	DF	IND	Bungson Singh
4	MF	IND	Gurnaj Singh Grewal
5	FW	IND	Omang Dodum
6	MF	IND	MD Arbash
7	FW	IND	Rohen Singh
8	FW	IND	Vishal Yadav
9	MF	IND	Rishikanta Meitei
10	DF	IND	Roshan Singh
11	DF	IND	Yaipharemba
12	GK	IND	Alsabith Sulaiman

No.	Pos.	Nation	Player
13	DF	IND	M.S. Thokchom
14	DF	IND	Mohamed Kaif
15	MF	IND	Aniket Yadav
16	MF	IND	Ningthoukhongjam
17	DF	IND	Thoungamba Singh
18	MF	IND	Danny Meitei
19	DF	IND	Karish Soram
20	FW	IND	Ahongshangbam
21	FW	IND	Tanbir Dey
22	FW	IND	Prashan Jajo
23	GK	IND	Pranav Sundarraman
