= 1999 ANFA League Cup =

1999 ANFA Coca-Cola National League Cup
- Organiser(s): All Nepal Football Association
- Region: Nepal
- Teams: 135+
- Current champions: Mahendra Police

The 1999 ANFA National League Cup was a domestic cup association football competition organised by the All Nepal Football Association. It was held from 20 to 30 November 1999, and was called the 1999 ANFA Coca-Cola National League Cup for sponsorship reasons.

The winners of the ANFA League Cup qualified for the 1998–99 Asian Cup Winners' Cup.

== First round proper ==
Champion of each district advanced to second round. Unlike other districts, Kathmandu Valley teams participated in a qualifying group stage tournament.

=== Kanchanpur District ===
Club
Tripura Youth Club
Kanchan Youth Club
Byapari Boys Club
Sankata Boys Club (Kanch.)
Young Star Club
Hotle Football Club (HFC?)
Youth Club
Ninglasainee Club
Ram Youth Club
Deep Jyoti
Bhanu Club
Aadarsha Club

=== Chitwan District ===
Club
Amar Youth Club
Shardangar Youth Club
Youth Gold Star Club
Shihar Club
Unknown
Unknown

=== Dang District ===
The champion of the Dang District is unknown.

Club
Tulsipur Youth Club
Aikta Tiger Club
Amar Madhamik Club
Jyotipunj Club
Junchetna Youth Club
Nepal Magar Youth Club
Super Yog Club
Kisan Jagreet Club
Dipendra Prahari Club
Nepal Youth Club

=== Morang District ===
Club
Chandra Surya Sports Club
Sthaniya Munal Sporting Club
Haraicha Sports Club
Mills Town
Saino Sporting Club
Chartare Sports Club
Belbari XI
Chutansheel Youth Samaj
Manalpath Sports Club
Unknown
Unknown

=== Jhapa District ===
Club
Munal Club
Khel United Boys Sports Club
Kakrabhutta Sports Club
Chandai Youth Club
Samajsewa Kendra
Rolling Club
Mechi Unesco Club
Unknown
Unknown
Unknown
Unknown
Unknown

=== Sindhupalchok District ===
Club
Youth Sports Club (Sind.)
Agrasari Youth Pariwar [Family]
Chautari Youth Club
Sindhu Junior Team
Unknown
Unknown
Unknown

=== Parsa District ===
Club
Youth Sports Club (Parsa)
Galaxy Club
Narayani Sports Club
Punchum Club
Trisiktha Club
Laliguras
Other participating teams not known

=== Saptari District ===
Club
Triyuga Club (Phutepoor)
Himalaya Club
Other participating teams not known

=== Dhanusa District ===
Club
Mithila Football Club
Laliguras Youth Club
Mandimandhup
Unknown
Unknown
Unknown
Unknown
Unknown
Unknown
Unknown
Unknown

=== Sunsari District ===
Club
Mitheri Club
Temke XI
Eleven Arrows
Samyukta Youth Club
The Boys Group
Green Colors Club
Mitra Milan Club
Other participating teams not known

=== Mahottari District ===
The champion of the Mahottari District is unknown.

Club
Jaleswor Blue
Suktakholi Sanskrita Samudayik Club
Bharatpur*
Other participating teams not known

*Not to be confused with Bharatpur Chitwan

=== Ilam District ===
Club
My Valley Sporting Club
Helibod Team
Pubamai Football Team
Aikthaja XI
Pashupatinagar XI
Suyapatri XI
Chulachuli XI
Jeetpur XI*

*Unclear if Jeetpur participated or not.

=== Makawanpur District ===
The champion of the Makawanpur District is unknown.

Club
My Valley Sporting Club
Hetauda Youth Club
Sagar Club
Phalaingal Club
Headamba
Shobha Sports Club
Morning Football Club
Unknown
Unknown
Unknown
Unknown

=== Kailali District ===
Club
Boradadi Youth Club
Hetauda Youth Club
Manakamana Club
Unknown
Unknown
Unknown
Unknown
Unknown
Unknown
Unknown

=== Kaski District ===
Club
Bhimkali Youth Club
Amar Singh Youth Club (ABC Club)
Valley Sport
Sital Jyoti Youth Club
Sugum Youth Club
Sahara Youth Club
Pokhara Brothers' Club
Bagbazar Youth Club
United Youth Club
Unknown

=== Rupandehi District ===
Club
Participating teams not known

=== Palpa District ===
Club
Participating teams not known

=== Kavre District ===
Club
Dhulikhel XI
Other participating teams not known

=== Banke District ===
Club
Jaya Kisan Sports Club
Other participating teams not known

=== Kathmandu Valley ===
==== Group A ====
Team	Pld	W	D	L	GF	GA	GD	Pts
Rani Pokhari	1	1	0	0	1	0	+1	3
New Road Team	1	0	0	1	0	1	−1	0
Kathmandu Club (Note: Withdrew)	0	0	0	0	0	0	0	0

Notes:

Rani Pokhari	1–0	New Road Team

==== Group B ====
Team	Pld	W	D	L	GF	GA	GD	Pts
Manang Marsyangdi Club	2	1	1	0	7	2	+5	4
Sankata BSC	2	1	1	0	5	1	+4	4
Naxal YM	2	0	0	2	1	10	−9	0

Manang Marsyangdi Club	1–1	Sankata Boys SC

Manang Marsyangdi Club	6–1	Naxal Yuwa Mandal

Sankata Boys SC	4–0 (Note: Match postponed after Manang Marsyangdi fans stormed the pitch accusing Sankata and Naxal of match fixing. Sankata was later awarded a 4-0 win by the ANFA, but that was not enough for them to advance to the next round.)	Naxal Yuwa Mandal

==== Group C ====
Team	Pld	W	D	L	GF	GA	GD	Pts
Three Star	2	2	0	0	4	0	+4	6
Jawalakhel Youth Club	2	1	0	1	3	1	+2	3
Bansbari	2	0	0	2	0	6	−6	0

Three Star Club	1–0	Jawalakhel Youth Club

Three Star Club	3–0	Bansbari FC

Jawalakhel Youth Club	3–0	Bansbari FC

==== Group D ====
Team	Pld	W	D	L	GF	GA	GD	Pts
Friends Club	2	1	1	0	3	1	+2	4
Boys Union Club	2	1	0	1	4	5	−1	3
Boys Sports	2	0	1	1	4	5	−1	1

Friends Club	2–0	Boys Union Club

Friends Club	1–1	Boys Sports Club

Boys Union Club	4–3	Boys Sports Club

== Second round proper ==
23 teams qualified from the first round compete to secure a berth into the third round. Clubs are separated based on their districts, and grouped further (apart from the Kathmandu district. All teams qualified into the second round from Kathmandu Valley were given an automatic bye into the fourth round, however a sub knockout tournament was played to determine third round fixtures (the winner being placed on fourth round group A, runner up placed on fourth round group B.

=== Kathmandu Valley ===
==== Semi-finals ====
1 April 1999	Rani Pokhari	w/o*	Manang Marsyangdi Club

1 April 1999	Three Star Club	0–1	Friends Club

*Walkover awarded to Manang Marsyangdi Club

==== Finals ====
2 April 1999	Manang Marsyangdi Club	2–1	Friends Club

=== Western districts ===
==== Group A ====
Club	District
Unknown	Rupandehi
Boradadi Club	Kailali

25 May 1999	Rupandehi District Champion	2–0	Boradadi Club

==== Group B ====
Club	District
Bhimkali Youth Club	Kaski
Tripura Youth Club	Kanchanpur
Unknown	Dang

24 May 1999	Bhimkali Youth Club	Bhimkali win	Tripura Youth Club

25 May 1999	Dang District Champion	1–1	Tripura Youth Club

26 May 1999	Bhimkali Youth Club	Bhimkali draw/win	Dang District Champion

==== Group C ====
Club	District
Amar Youth Club	Chitwan
Youth Sports Club	Sindhupalchok

24 May 1999	Amar Youth Club	8–1	Youth Sports Club

==== Group D ====
Club	District
Dulikhel XI	Kavre
Jaya Kisan Sports Club	Banke
Unknown	Palpa

24 May 1999	Dulikhel XI	4–0	Jaya Kisan Sports Club

25 May 1999	Palpa District Champion	6–0	Jaya Kisan Sports Club

26 May 1999	Dulikhel XI	Dulikhel XI win	Palpa District Champion

=== Eastern districts ===
==== Group A ====
Club	District
Mathila Football Club	Dhanusa
Rolling Club	Jhapa
Unknown	Makawanpur

24 May 1999	Rolling Club	4–0	Makawanpur District Champion

25 May 1999	Makawanpur District Champion	Unknown	Mathila Football Club

26 May 1999	Rolling Club	Unknown	Mathila Football Club

==== Group B ====
Club	District
Triyuga Club	Saptari
Mills Town	Morang
Youth Sports Club	Parsa

24 May 1999	Mills Town	0–0	Youth Sports Club

25 May 1999	Triyuga Club	Unknown	Youth Sports Club

26 May 1999	Mills Town	Unknown	Triyuga Club

==== Group C ====
Club	District
The Boys Group	Sunsari
Helibod	Ilam
Unknown	Mahottari

24 May 1999	The Boys Group	1–1	Mahottari District Champion

25 May 1999	Mahottari District Champion	Unknown	Helibod

26 May 1999	The Boys Group	Unknown	Helibod

== Third round proper ==
=== Western districts ===
Team	Pld	W	D	L	GF	GA	GD	Pts
Rupandehi District Champions	3	2	1	0	7	2	+5	7
Dulikhel XI	3	2	1	0	4	1	+3	7
Amar Youth Club	3	1	0	2	4	5	−1	3
Bhimkali Youth Club	1	0	0	1	1	8	−7	0

27 May 1999	Rupandehi District Champion	3–2	Amar Youth Club

27 May 1999	Dulikhel XI	2–1	Bhimkali Youth Club

29 May 1999	Dulikhel XI	0–0	Rupandehi District Champion

29 May 1999	Amar Youth Club	2–0	Bhimkali Youth Club

31 May 1999	Rupandehi District Champion	4–0	Bhimkali Youth Club

31 May 1999	Dulikhel XI	2–0	Amar Youth Club

=== Eastern districts ===
Team	Pld	W	D	L	GF	GA	GD	Pts
The Boys Group	0	0	0	0	0	0	0	0
Mithila Football Club	0	0	0	0	0	0	0	0
Triyuga Club	0	0	0	0	0	0	0	0

May 1999	The Boys Group	TBG win	Mithila Football Club

May 1999	The Boys Group	TBG win	Triyuga Club

May 1999	Triyuga Club	Unknown	Mithila Football Club

== Fourth round proper ==
Mahendra Police and Tribhuvan Army were granted automatic byes into the fourth round as 1998 ANFA League Cup finalists.

=== Group A ===
Team	Pld	W	D	L	GF	GA	GD	Pts
Manang Marsyangdi Club	3	3	0	0	9	2	+7	9
Tribhuvan Army	3	2	0	1	4	3	+1	6
Three Star Club	3	1	0	2	2	4	−2	3
The Boys Group	3	0	0	3	2	8	−6	0

20 November 1999	Manang Marsyangdi Club	4–1	The Boys Group

20 November 1999	Three Star Club	0–1	Tribhuvan Army

22 November 1999	Three Star Club	1–0	The Boys Group

22 November 1999	Tribhuvan Army	0–2	Manang Marsyangdi Club

24 November 1999	Tribhuvan Army	3–1	The Boys Group

24 November 1999	Three Star Club	1–3	Manang Marsyangdi Club

=== Group B ===
Team	Pld	W	D	L	GF	GA	GD	Pts
Rani Pokhari	3	2	1	0	2	1	+1	7 (Note: match against Rupandehi not included in the GD due to incomplete data)
Mahendra Police	3	2	0	1	10	1	+9	6 (Note: match against Friends Club not included in the GD due to incomplete data)
Friends Club	3	1	1	1	3	3	0	4 (Note: match against Mahendra Police not included in the GD due to incomplete data)
Rupandehi District Champions	3	0	0	3	1	12	−11	0 (Note: match against Rani Pokhari not included in the GD due to incomplete data)

Notes:

21 November 1999	Rani Pokhari	1–0	Mahendra Police

21 November 1999	Friends Club	1–0	Rupandehi District Champions

23 November 1999	Friends Club	1–1	Rani Pokhari

23 November 1999	Rupandehi District Champions	0–10	Mahendra Police

25 November 1999	Mahendra Police	Mahendra win	Friends Club

25 November 1999	Rani Pokhari	Rani Pokhari win	Rupandehi District Champions

== Knockout stage ==
Semi-finals
27 Nov – Dasarath Rangasala
Mahendra Police	1 (4)
Manang Marshyangdi	1 (2)
28 Nov – Dasarath Rangasala
Tribhuvan Army	2
Rani Pokhari	0

Final
30 Nov – Dasarath Rangasala
Mahendra Police	1
Tribhuvan Army	0
Third place
30 Nov – Dasarath Rangasala
Manang Marshyangdi	5
Rani Pokhari	0

=== Semi-finals ===
27 November 1999

Mahendra Police	1–1	Manang Marsyangdi Club
Penalties
	4–2

28 November 1999

Tribhuvan Army	2–0	Rani Pokhari

=== Third-place match ===
30 November 1999

Manang Marsyangdi Club	5–0	Rani Pokhari

=== Final ===
The finals of the 1999 ANFA National League Cup saw a Departmental Derby between long-term rivals Mahendra Police Club and Tribhuvan Army Club.

30 November 1999

Mahendra Police	1–0	Tribhuvan Army

== See also ==
- ANFA National League Cup
- Nepal National League
- Martyr's Memorial League
- ANFA Cup
- All Nepal Football Association
- Football in Nepal
