= Vila Real Quelimane =

- Full name: Vila Real Quelimane
- Ground: Vila de Stadium; Quelimane, Mozambique
- Capacity: 10.000
- League: Moçambola2
- 2006: 10

Vila Real Quelimane, usually known simply as Vila Real Quelimane, is a traditional football (soccer) club based in Quelimane, Mozambique.

== Stadium ==
The club plays their home matches at Vila de Stadium, which has a maximum capacity of 10,000 people.

== Current squad ==
Note: Flags indicate national team as defined under FIFA eligibility rules; some limited exceptions apply. Players may hold more than one non-FIFA nationality.

No.	Pos.	Nation	Player
—	GK	(Mozambique) MOZ	Sunches Fereira
—	GK	(Mozambique) MOZ	Leviksa
—	MF	(Mozambique) MOZ	Augusto Morkato
—	MF	(Mozambique) MOZ	Hupo Lotuso
—	DF	(Nepal) NEP	Osario Fanush
—	MF	(Mozambique) MOZ	Adriano Penta
—	DF	(Mozambique) MOZ	Umfaso Kartez
—	MF	(Mozambique) MOZ	Lo Manto De Sunches
—	MF	(Mozambique) MOZ	Jose Peikano
—	DF	(Mozambique) MOZ	Alehandro De Remis
—	DF	(Mozambique) MOZ	Alberto Karvonna
—	FW	(Mozambique) MOZ	Henriqe Pelabe
—	FW	(Mozambique) MOZ	Oskar Tamito
—	DF	(Mozambique) MOZ	Adriano

No.	Pos.	Nation	Player
—	MF	(Mozambique) MOZ	Kord Antos
—	DF	(Mozambique) MOZ	Elver Chanto
—	FW	(Mozambique) MOZ	Drumeiru
—	FW	(Mozambique) MOZ	Albert Daniel
—	DF	(Togo) TOG	Philippe Draman
—	FW	(Mozambique) MOZ	Piter Vondo
—	DF	(Mozambique) MOZ	Edgar Mendes
—	DF	(Mozambique) MOZ	Franche Auto
—	DF	(Mozambique) MOZ	Alehandro Wo
—	GK	(Mozambique) MOZ	Lukash Marwan
—	DF	(Mozambique) MOZ	Ed Vaso
