= All Nepal Football Association =

Governing body of association football in Nepal

AFC
- Short name: ANFA
- Founded: 1951; 75 years ago
- Headquarters: Satdobato, Lalitpur, Nepal
- Membership: Suspended by FIFA since June 2026
- FIFA affiliation: 1972
- AFC affiliation: 1970
- SAFF affiliation: 1997
- President: Pankaj Bikram Nembang
- Website: the-anfa.com

The All Nepal Football Association (ANFA) (Nepali: अखिल नेपाल फुटबल संघ (एन्फा)) is the governing body of football in Nepal. It is responsible for the men's and women's national teams as well as club competitions. The organisation was founded in 1951 as the All Nepal Football Association and became affiliated with FIFA in 1972. The current President of ANFA is Pankaj Bikram Nembang. Its current headquarters is located in the ANFA House in ANFA Complex, Satdobato.

== History ==
=== Pre-ANFA (1921–1950) ===
The entry and initial start-up of football came in Nepal during the Rana regime in 1921. The game was introduced in Nepal by the young players who had learnt this game from other countries. Games was watched by a huge mass of audience and became very famous at that time. However, it is believed that the pioneer of this game in Nepal was Narayan Narsingh Rana of Thamel and Chandrajung Thapa of Naxal.

There were some places, which were used as football ground for palace teams, such as Sujan Khanal, Mrigendra Shamsher Niwas Babarmahal, Mahabir Niwas Tangal Palace, Narshamsher Niwas Singha Durbar, Rudra Shamsher Niwas Bhahadur Bhavan, and Thamel Narsingh camp. Whereas in the 1930s, both local and palace teams commonly used the grounds of Singhdarbar, Chhauni, Gaucharan, Jawalakhel and Lainchaur for playing football. Despite political instability at that time football was played enthusiastically during 1921 to 1990 by various teams without goal posts, but the criterion was that the opponent team could follow the ball to the goal line.

=== FIFA suspension ===
FIFA suspended ANFA from 24 June 2026 until further notice. Therefore, all teams and clubs affiliated with ANFA are no longer entitled to take part in international competitions.

== Development ==
Football development in Nepal had only been possible when ANFA started working from root level. Keeping this in mind, ANFA has given its work priority for building fundamental material for the association. Firstly, ANFA has built a hostel in Satdobato, Lalitpur which has shown their dedication toward the development of football in Nepal by opening an ANFA office with a playground. This work of ANFA has been appreciated everywhere. Before starting a major project, the Federation of International Football Association (FIFA) provided ANFA an opportunity to represent as a model in FIFA congress. ANFA has built technical centers (or football academies) in Chyasal of Lalitpur, Butwal, Rupandehi, Sunsari and Dharan under the roof of the FIFA Goal project. Similarly, ANFA has planned to open technical centers in the Mid-Western and Far-Western development regions of Nepal in the future.

== National teams ==
=== Men ===
- Nepal national football team
- Nepal national football B team
- Nepal national under-23 football team
- Nepal national under-20 football team
- Nepal national under-17 football team
- Nepal national futsal team

=== Women ===
- Nepal women's national football team
- Nepal women's national under-23 football team
- Nepal women's national under-20 football team
- Nepal women's national under-17 football team
- Nepal women's national futsal team

== Affiliated province football associations ==
There are currently 7 province FAs and 48 district FAs affiliated with the All Nepal Football Association.

No.	Association	Province	Teams	President
1	Koshi Province Football Association	Koshi Province	Koshi Province (M, W)	Kishor Rai
2	Madhesh Province Football Association	Madhesh Province	Madhesh Province (M, W)	Nepal Karki
3	Bagmati Province Football Association	Bagmati Province	Bagmati Province (M, W)	Rajendra Kumar Shrestha
4	Gandaki Province Football Association	Gandaki Province	Gandaki Province (M, W)	Dipendra Shrestha
5	Lumbini Province Football Association	Lumbini Province	Lumbini Province (M, W)	Bhupendra Bikram Thapa
6	Karnali Province Football Association	Karnali Province	Karnali Province (M, W)	Pramod Hamal
7	Sudurpashchim Province Football Association	Sudurpashchim Province	Sudurpashchim Province (M, W)	Dinesh Kumar Shrestha

== Competitions ==
- Martyr's Memorial A-Division League
- Martyr's Memorial B-Division League
- Martyr's Memorial C-Division League
- Nepal Super League
- National League
- 'A' Division National Futsal League
- ANFA President's League
- Province League
- District League
- ANFA U-18 Youth League
- ANFA U-16 Youth League
- ANFA Women's League
- Inter-School National Tournament
- ANFA Cup
- ANFA League Cup (formerly)

== Current title holders ==
Competition	Year	Champions	Title	Next edition
Senior (men's)
National Games	2022	APF F.C.	National Games Champion	2024
A-Division League	2023	Church Boys United	A-Division Champion	2025
B-Division League	2025	Planning Boyz United	B-Division Champion	2026
C-Division League	2024	Bagmati Youth Club	C-Division Champion	2025-26
A-Division Futsal League	2021	Sports Castle Pokhara	A-Division Futsal Champion	2024-25
Nepal Super League (NSL)	2025	Lalitpur City F.C.	NSL champion	
Senior (women's)
ANFA Women's League	2024	APF FC	National Women's Champion	2025–26
National Games	2022	APF FC	National Games Champion	2024
Youth (men's)
ANFA U-18 League (Lalit Memorial)	2024	Nepal Police U18	ANFA U18 Champion	2025
ANFA U-16 League	2024–25	Church Boys United U16	ANFA U16 Champion	2025
ANFA U-14 Boy's Interschool Championship	2025			
Youth (women's)
ANFA Junior Girl's National Football Championship	2025			
ANFA U-14 Girl's Interschool Championship	2025			

== Executive committee ==
Member	Office
Pankaj Bikram Nebmang	President
Bir Bahadur Khadka	Senior vice president
Dawa Lama	Vice president
Birat Jung Shahi	Vice president
Dipak Khatiwada	Vice president
Dirgha Bahadur K.C.	Vice president
Kiran Rai	General secretary
Rabindra Joshi	Treasurer
Basanta Aryal	Assistant general secretary
Arun Man Joshi	Assistant general secretary
Damodar Badri Bhattarai	Assistant general secretary
Sarala Shrestha	Member
Pema Dolma Lama	Member
Manish Joshi	Member
Anil Malla	Member
Rabindra Chand	Member
Bikas Narayan Shrestha	Member
Bhojraj Shahi	Member
Mahendra Kshetri	Member
Purushottam Thapa	Member
Ramesh Byanjankar	Member
Maniraj Bista	Member
Tika Ram Lama	Member
Rupesh Adhikari	Member
Dipendra Dhimal
Bharat Budha Thapa

== Suspension by FIFA ==
On 24 June 2026, the Bureau of the FIFA Council suspended the All Nepal Football Association with immediate effect due to flagrant violations of the FIFA Statutes linked to third-party interference, in accordance with Article 14 paragraphs 1(i) and 3 of the FIFA Statutes. The suspension followed a governance dispute involving Nepal's National Sports Council and remains in effect until FIFA determines that the conditions for lifting it have been met.

== See also ==
- Football in Nepal
- Nepal national football team
