= ANFA League Cup =

ANFA National League Cup
- Founded: 1985
- Region: Nepal

The ANFA National League Cup or Nepal National League Cup was a knockout football competition in men's domestic Nepalese football. It was organised by the All Nepal Football Association and served as a qualification tournament for the Asian Cup Winners' Cup. After the 1999 edition, the National League Cup was postponed indefinitely. Since then, the Khukuri Gold Cup attempted to revive the format, with the 2004 season seeing 425 clubs participating in the cup tournament.

== Winners ==
Edition	Year	Winner	Runner-up	Score	No. of teams	Comment
1st	1985	New Road Team				
2nd	1986	Unknown				
3rd	1987	Unknown				
4th	1988	Unknown				
5th	1989	Unknown				
6th	1987	Tribhuvan Army Club				
7th	1988	Mahendra Police Club				
8th	1999	Mahendra Police Club	Tribhuvan Army Club	1–0	135+	
