= Koshi Province women's football team =

Koshi Province
- Full name: Koshi Province women's football team
- Founded: 2019; 7 years ago
- Owner: Koshi Province Football Association
- League: National Women's League
- Website: https://the-anfa.com/state-football/1
Home colours

Koshi Province women's football team, (formerly known as Province No. 1 women's football team) and also known as Team Koshi is a Nepali provincial women's football team, based in the Koshi Province of Nepal. The team plays association football in the National Women's League Nepal, which is the top tier professional women's football competition in Nepal.

== Records by seasons ==
Season	Teams	Position	AFC Women's Champions League
2024	10	5th	

== Current squad ==
As of 9 September 2024

Note: Flags indicate national team as defined under FIFA eligibility rules; some limited exceptions apply. Players may hold more than one non-FIFA nationality.

No.	Pos.	Nation	Player
1	GK	IND	Buli Sarkar
4	DF	NEP	Anisha Rai
6	DF	NEP	Jhuma Bishwokarma
13	DF	NEP	Neha Kumari Chaudhary
7	FW	NEP	Manita Tumrok
21	FW	NEP	Purnima Rai
10	MF	NEP	Sanju Maya Tamang
19	MF	NEP	Keren Limbu

No.	Pos.	Nation	Player
17	MF	NEP	Simran Rai
2	DF	NEP	Susmita Chaudhari
15	MF	NEP	Pratiksha Rai
3	MF	IND	Sunita Sarkar
9	MF	IND	Tamalika Sarkar
12	MF	NEP	Mamata Raut
11	FW	NEP	Samiksha Magar
22	GK	NEP	Ranju Rajbanshi

== Technical staff ==
Role	Name
Head coach	(Nepal) Shyam Manandhar
Assistant coach	(Nepal) Pasang Tamang
Goalkeeper coach	(Nepal) Sunita Rai
Team Manager	(Nepal) Keshav Kumar Karki
Team Official	(Nepal) Singha Bahadur Maden
Physio	(Nepal) Sharda Limbu
Team Medic	(Nepal) Arpana Bohora
