= Karnali Province women's football team =

Karnali Province
- Full name: Karnali Province women's football team
- Founded: 2019; 7 years ago
- Owner: Karnali Province Football Association
- League: National Women's League
- Website: koshiprovincefootball.org.np
Away colours

Karnali Province women's football team, (formerly known as Province No. 6 women's football team) and also known as Team Karnali is a Nepali provincial women's football team, based in the Karnali Province of Nepal. The team plays association football in the National Women's League Nepal, which is the top tier professional women's football competition in Nepal.

== Records by seasons ==
Season	Teams	Position	AFC Women's Champions League
2024	10	9th	

== Current squad ==
As of 9 September 2024

Note: Flags indicate national team as defined under FIFA eligibility rules; some limited exceptions apply. Players may hold more than one non-FIFA nationality.

No.	Pos.	Nation	Player
32	GK	NEP	Lila Joshi
18	DF	NEP	Tulasa Bohara
22	DF	NEP	Anjana Pun
4	DF	NEP	Bipana Snehi
2	DF	NEP	Rita Kumari Khatri
6	DF	NEP	Sangita Adhikari
3	DF	NEP	Sita Rokaya
5	DF	NEP	Srijana Batala
23	DF	NEP	Sudiksha Rokaya
26	DF	NEP	Binita Rai
25	DF	NEP	Puja Thebe
11	MF	NEP	Sibangi Snehi
17	MF	NEP	Asmita Gurung
12	MF	NEP	Lalita Kumari Bhat
14	MF	NEP	Bhumika Budhathoki

No.	Pos.	Nation	Player
21	MF	NEP	Garima Rai
19	MF	NEP	Imetna Suhang
9	MF	NEP	Nirmala Acharya
16	MF	NEP	Rebika Nepali
7	MF	NEP	Sunkala Rai
28	MF	NEP	Kritisha Tamang
27	MF	NEP	Sangita BK
24	MF	NEP	Aashika Upadhyay
29	MF	NEP	Pratima Sherpa
10	FW	NEP	Barsha Oli
13	FW	NEP	Barsha Hamal
15	FW	NEP	Sabina Raji
20	FW	NEP	Sanjita Bhomjan
8	FW	NEP	Sangita Kumari Malla
44	GK	NEP	Triza Shahi

== Technical staff ==
Role	Name
Head coach
Assistant coach	(Nepal) Ganesh Khadka, (Nepal) Binod Majhi
Team Manager	(Nepal) Janaki Tamang
Team Official	(Nepal) Bikram Maharjan
Physio	(Nepal) Luna Baduwal
