= Subash Bam =

Nepalese footballer (born 2008)

Personal information
- Full name: Subash Bikram Thakuri
- Date of birth: 5 September 2008 (age 18)
- Place of birth: Kalikot District, Nepal
- Height: 1.69 m (5 ft 7 in)
- Positions: Midfielder; winger; forward

Team information
- Current team: Shree Bhagawati Youth Club

Senior career*
Years	Team	Apps	(Gls)
–2024	Nepal Police FC		
2025–	Siniloan Blues		

International career^{‡}
2025–	Nepal	5	(0)
- * Club domestic league appearances and goals ‡ National team caps and goals as of 18 November 2025

Subash Bikram Thakuri (Nepali: सुवास बम; born 5 September 2008) is a Nepalese footballer who plays as a midfielder, winger, or forward for Shree Bhagawati Youth Club.

== Early life ==
Bam was born on 5 September 2008 in Kalikot District, Nepal. Born to Hem Raj Bam and Himsoba Kam, he has two elder brothers and moved with his family to Birendranagar, Nepal at a young age before moving to Kathmandu, Nepal at the age of five. Growing up, he regarded Brazil international Neymar as his football idol.

== Club career ==
Bam started his career with Nepali side Nepal Police FC. In 2025, he signed for Filipino side Siniloan Blues. And currently he is playing for Shree Bhagawati Youth Club for ANFA National League

== International career ==
Bam is a Nepal international. Nepalese newspaper The Kathmandu Post wrote in 2025 that he was "making names in the under-age categories... leading as the captain as well". During the summer of 2022 and 2024, he played for the Nepal national under-17 football team at the 2022 SAFF U-17 Championship and the 2024 SAFF U-17 Championship.

== Style of play ==
Bam plays as a midfielder, winger, or forward. Right-footed, he is known for his dribbling ability and shooting ability.
