= 2026 ANFA National League =

Nepal National League
- Season: 2026
- Dates: 14 January – 12 April
- Matches: 94
- Goals: 253 (2.69 per match)
- Top goalscorer: Jonathan Cantillana; 10 goals
- Longest winning run: 5 games Church Boys United
- Longest unbeaten run: 12 games Laligurans
- Longest winless run: 10 games Nawa Jana Jagriti; Kankre Bihar
- Longest losing run: 9 games Nawa Jana Jagriti
- All statistics correct as of 16 March 2026.

The 2026 ANFA National League (officially National League 2082) is the 3rd edition of the Nepal National League. The competition features 17 teams competing in a single round-robin format. The champions or the highest ranked team with a national license will qualify for the 2026–27 AFC Challenge League preliminary stage. The league was postponed on 20 March, after foreign players were found to be participating without work permits.

== Teams ==
The following 17 teams compete in the 2026 National League, 11 from the 2023 Martyr's Memorial A-Division League, 2 promoted from the 2025 Martyr's Memorial B-Division League and 4 that qualified from the 2025 ANFA President League. Himalayan Sherpa Club is the only A-division club not participating in this league.

Team	Location	Head Coach	Captain	Previous season
APF FC	Kathmandu (Halchowk), Bagmati	(Nepal) Rajendra Tamang	Top Bista	12th (A-Division)
Chitlang FC	Makwanpur, Bagmati	(Nepal) Prajwal Pratip Chhetri	Fagu Ram Tharu	Runner-Up (President)
Church Boys United	Lalitpur (Balkumari), Bagmati	(Nepal) Ashok Thapa	Ananta Tamang	1st (A-Division)
Friends Club	Lalitpur (Kupondole), Bagmati	(Nepal) Ramesh Maharjan	Rupesh KC	11th (A-Division)
Jawalakhel YC	Lalitpur (Jawalakhel), Bagmati	(Nepal) Sunil Shrestha	Yunesh Chaudhary	4th (A-Division)
Kankre Bihar YC	Birendranagar, Karnali	(Nepal)		Semi-Final (President)
Laligurans Association Club	Pokhara, Gandaki	(Nepal) Kiran Shrestha	Raj Bhusal	Champion (President)
Machhindra FC	Kathmandu (Jana Bahal), Bagmati	(Nepal) Prabesh Katuwal	Bishal Shrestha	2nd (A-Division)
Manang Marshyangdi Club	Pokhara, Gandaki	(Nepal) Sailesh Karmacharya	Nava Raj Gurung	8th (A-Division)
Nawa Jana Jagriti YC	Jitpursimara, Madhesh	(Nepal)	Umesh Sanjel	Semi-Final (President)
Nepal Police FC	Kathmandu (Maharajgunj), Bagmati	(Nepal) Chetan Ghimire	Ram Wajee	3rd (A-Division)
New Road Team	Kathmandu (New Road), Bagmati	(Nepal) Jeevan Sinkeman	Jagajeet Shrestha	6th (A-Division)
Planning Boyz United	Budhanilkantha (Kapan), Bagmati	(Nepal) Ganesh Khadka	Shankar Tharu	1st (B-Division)
Sankata FC	Kathmandu (Te Bahal), Bagmati	(Nepal) Rabindra Silakar	Sunil Bal	9th (A-Division)
Satdobato Youth Club	Lalitpur (Satdobato), Bagmati	(Nepal) Balgopal Sakhukhala		5th (A-Division)
Shree Bhagwati Club	Tokha, Bagmati	(Nepal) Sanoj Shrestha	Ashok Khawas	2nd (B-Division)
Tribhuvan Army FC	Kathmandu (Bhadrakali), Bagmati	(Nepal) Jitendra Karki	George Prince Karki	7th (A-Division)

== Foreign players ==
For the 2026 season, ANFA adopted a registration system based on three distinct "Routes," allowing clubs to specialize their recruitment. The SAFF slot is reserved for players from South Asian nations (India, Pakistan, Bangladesh, Sri Lanka, Maldives, and Bhutan). Departmental clubs (Army, Police, APF) and Friends Club traditionally do not field foreign players.

=== Club Foreign Player List ===
Club	Route	Player 1	Player 2	Player 3	Player 4-10	SAFF Player	Former Players
APF FC	None	None					
Chitlang FC	Route 2	(Nigeria) Mathew Babatunde	(Nigeria) Solomon Ilesanmi				
Church Boys United	Route 2	(Nigeria) Abayomi Fakunle	(Cameroon) Serge Dicka	(Nigeria) Neymar			
Friends Club	None	None					
Jawalakhel YC	Route 2	(Ghana) Nicholas Hamilton	(The Gambia) Abdul Majid Shamatey	(Uzbekistan) Abdulaziz Nishonboev		(India) Nicholas Fernandes	
Kankrebihar Youth Club	Route 3						
Laligurans AC	Route 2	(Ivory Coast) Yves Priso					
Machhindra FC	Route 1	(Palestine) Jonathan Cantillana	(Uzbekistan) Sardor Rashidov	(Japan) Daisuke Nomura			
Manang Marshyangdi Club	Route 2	(Ghana) Andrew Ebo Yamoah	(Nigeria) Olawale Oladipo				
Nawa Janajagriti Youth Club	Route 3						
Nepal Police FC	None	None					
New Road Team	Route 2	(Japan) Shota Atsumi	(Japan) H. Morimoto	(Ghana) Stephen Adams			
Planning Boyz United	Route 2						
Sankata FC	Route 2	(Burkina Faso) Wendpanga Gilbert Bilgo					
Satdobato Youth Club	Route 2	(Uzbekistan) Farrukh Musabekov					
Shree Bhagwati Club	Route 2	(Nigeria) Peter Segun	(Nigeria) Martins Kayode Ajayi				
Tribhuvan Army FC	None	None					

== League table ==
Pos	Team	Pld	W	D	L	GF	GA	GD	Pts	Qualification
1	APF FC	11	7	4	0	19	7	+12	25	Qualification for AFC Challenge League
2	Church Boys United	11	8	1	2	25	12	+13	25	
3	Machhindra FC	11	8	1	2	18	5	+13	25	
4	Laligurans AFC	12	6	6	0	18	7	+11	24	
5	Tribhuvan Army	11	7	2	2	25	7	+18	23	
6	Planning Boyz United	12	6	4	2	23	11	+12	22	
7	New Road Team	11	5	5	1	14	7	+7	20	
8	Jawalakhel YC	11	4	2	5	18	13	+5	14	
9	Manang Marshyangdi	12	3	4	5	10	13	−3	13	
10	Sankata FC	11	3	4	4	13	14	−1	13	
11	Friends Club	11	3	4	4	10	9	+1	13	
12	Shree Bhagwati	12	3	3	6	15	16	−1	12	
13	Nepal Police	11	2	3	6	14	18	−4	9	
14	Satdobato YC	11	1	6	4	9	15	−6	9	
15	Chitlang FC	12	1	5	6	10	25	−15	8	
16	Nawajana Jagriti YC	11	1	1	9	8	41	−33	4	
17	Kakre Bihar YC	11	0	1	10	8	37	−29	1	

Updated to match(es) played on 18 March 2026. Source: HamroKhelkud
Rules for classification: 1) Points; 2) Head-to-head; 3) Goal difference; 4) Goals scored.

== Season statistics ==
=== Top scorers ===
As of 15 March 2026

Rank	Player	Club	Goals
1	(Palestine) Jonathan Cantillana	Machhindra	10
2	(Nigeria) Abayomi Fakunle	Church Boys United	7
3	(Nepal) Milan Rai	Church Boys United	6
4	(France) Papa Kebe	Planning Boyz	5
4	(Nepal) Nawayug Shrestha	Tribhuvan Army	5
4	(Nigeria) Timothy Chiemerie Okereke	NRT	5
7	(Nepal) Fagu Ram Tharu	Planning Boyz	4
7	(Nepal) Nirajan Dhami	Tribhuvan Army	4
7	(Nepal) Yubaraj Khadka	APF	4
7	(Nepal) Dharbendra Kunwar	Jawalakhel	4
7	(Nepal) Aashish Gurung	Laligurans	4
7	(Jamaica) Nicholas Odane Hamilton	Jawalakhel	4

=== Clean sheets ===
As of 13 March 2026

Rank	Player	Club	Clean sheets
1	(Nepal) Yogesh Dhimal	Planning Boyz	5
2	(Nepal) Bishal Shrestha	Machhindra	4
2	(Nepal) Anjal Shrestha	APF	4
2	(Nepal) Bikesh Kuthu	Tribhuvan Army	4
2	(Nepal) Tikendra Thapa	Jawalakhel	4
3	(Nepal) Bishal Sunar	NRT	3

== Results ==
The 2026 season is played as a single round-robin format across 17 rounds. Matches are held at the Dasharath Stadium, ANFA Complex and Chyasal Stadium.

=== Results table ===
Home \ Away	APF	CHI	CBU	FRI	JYC	KBY	LAC	MAC	MMC	NJJ	NPC	NRT	PBU	SFC	SYC	SBC	TAC
APF FC			4–1	1–0	2–1									2–1			
Chitlang FC						5–1		1–3		2–1	1–1				0–0	4–0	1–5
Church Boys United	1–4				3–0					6–1						1–1	
Friends Club	0–1					3–1			1–2			0–1		0–0			
Jawalakhel YC	1–2		0–3				0–1									4–0	
Kankrebihar YC		1–5		1–3								0–2		0–4			
Laligurans AFC					1–0			0–0		4–1	1–0						0–0
Machhindra FC		3–1					0–0		2–1			1–0	2–0				
Manang Marshyangdi				2–1				1–2							0–1		0–5
Nawa Janajagriti YC		1–2	1–6				1–4									1–5	
Nepal Police		1–1					0–1						0–1			1–0	
New Road Team				1–0		2–0		0–1						3–1	3–1		
Planning Boyz United								0–2			1–0				4–2		0–0
Sankata FC	1–2			0–0		4–0						1–3			0–0		0–0
Satdobato YC		0–0							1–0			1–3	2–4	0–0			
Shree Bhagwati Club		0–4	1–1		0–4					5–1	0–1						1–3
Tribhuvan Army		5–1					0–0		5–0				0–0	0–0		3–1	

Updated to match(es) played on 4 February 2026. Source: Hamro Khelkud
Legend: Blue = home team win; Yellow = draw; Red = away team win.

== Prize money ==
The following prize structure was established for the 2026 season:

- Champions: रु 5,000,000
- Runners-up: रु 2,500,000
- Third place: रु 1,500,000
- Fair play: रु 100,000
