= 2021 'A' Division National Futsal League =

First season of NFL

'A' Division National Futsal League
- Season: 2021
- Dates: 18 September – 8 October 2021
- Champions: Sports Castle Pokhara
- Runner up: Sankhamul Futsal
- Matches: 49
- Goals: 402 (8.2 per match)
- Biggest home win: SCP 12-1 Lumbini
- Highest scoring: Prabhatpheri 6-11 Rising
- Longest unbeaten run: Sports Castle Pokhara (8 matches)
- Longest winless run: Jharana Sports Club (9 matches)
- Longest losing run: Jharana Sports Club (9 matches)
- All statistics correct as of 8 October 2021.

The 2021 'A' Division National Futsal League was the first season of the 'A' Division National Futsal League, the top flight based club futsal league of Nepal. A total of ten teams qualified in the tournament from 18 September to 8 October 2021. Sports Castle Pokhara were crowned as the league winners after defeating Sankhamul Futsal in the final by 4-2.

== Background ==
All Nepal Football Association ANFA announced the creation of 'A' Division Futsal League on 25 January 2021. A total of 10 teams, two teams from Province 1 and Gandaki Province, one from Province 2, for from Bagmati Province and one team representing Lumbini, Karnali and Sudurpashim provinces, takes part in the competition organized by ANFA Futsal Committee.

Qualification round was completed in Province 1 on 16 March. Eight teams participated for two slots in 'A' Division Futsal League. In the final, Futsal 5 Dharan defeated The Rising Club Dharan 5–4 in penalty shootout, after the match ended on 4–4 in regular time. Both team qualified for the 'A' division Futsal League.

Qualification round was completed for Lumbini, Karnali and Sudurpaschim Province on 3 April. Eight teams participated for one slot in 'A' Division Futsal League. In the final, Lumbini Futsal defeated Jharna Sports Club 7–2. Lumbini Futsal qualified for the 'A' division Futsal League.

Qualification round was completed in Bagmati Province on 11 April. Thirty-two teams participated for four slots in 'A' Division Futsal League. In the final, Dhuku Futsal Hub defeated Sankhamul Futsal 8–2 to win the qualifier. Four teams; both the finalist and Prabhatpheri Youth Club and Machhindra Sky Goals were qualified for the 'A' division Futsal League.

Qualification round was completed for Gandaki Province on 18 April. Eight teams participated for two slots in 'A' Division Futsal League. In the final, Sports Castle Pokhara defeated Sabin Memorial FC 3–2 in penalty shootout as game ended 2–2 in regular time. Both Finalist qualified for the 'A' division Futsal League.

Although the plan was to conduct a Province 2 qualifier, due to the technical reasons, the qualifier was cancelled and the remaining slot was given to Jharna Sports Club

== Venue ==
All matches were held at the Pokhara Multipurpose Covered Hall in Pokhara, Nepal.

Pokhara	Pokhara is located in Nepal
Pokhara Multipurpose Covered Hall	Pokhara is located in Nepal
Capacity: —	Pokhara is located in Nepal

== Teams ==
=== Personnels ===
Team	Coach	Manager	Captain
The Rising Club Dharan	(Nepal) Yubendra Gurung	(Nepal) Ravi Rai	(Nepal) Sachin Shrestha
Machhindra Sky Goals	(Nepal) Ramesh Sinkemana	(Nepal) Shiva Ghale	(Nepal) Nirmal Gurung
Sports Castle Pokhara	(Nepal) Bishnu Gurung	(Nepal) Om Gurung	(Nepal) Chhitiz Gurung
Prabhatpheri Youth Club	(Nepal) Saroj Thapa	(Nepal) Krishna Shrestha	(Nepal) Bishal Saru Magar
Lumbini Futsal	(Nepal) Prajwol Shrestha	(Nepal) Sworup Man Sainju	(Nepal) Anjan Thapa
Jharana Sports Club	(Nepal) Nirmal Thapa	(Nepal) Cjan Thapa	(Nepal) Om Prakash Thapa
Futsal 5 Dharan	(Nepal) Biswash Lama	(Nepal) Jivan Ale Magar	(Nepal) Sandip Karki
Sankhamul Futsal	(Nepal) Prakash Pariyar	(Nepal) Pramod Singh	(Nepal) -
Dhuku Futsal Hub	(Nepal) Raj Maharjan	(Nepal) Sanam Kumar Basyal	(Nepal) Sumit Kumar Ale
Sabin Memorial FC	(Nepal) Rajendra Tamang	(Nepal) Sanjay Ligal	(Nepal) Anup Rana Magar

== League stage ==
=== League table ===
Pos	Team	Pld	W	D	L	GF	GA	GD	Pts	Qualification
1	Sports Castle Pokhara	9	7	1	1	48	18	+30	22	Advance to Playoffs
2	The Rising Club Dharan	9	6	1	2	50	42	+8	19	Advance to Playoffs
3	Sankhamul Futsal	9	5	3	1	36	20	+16	18	Advance to Playoffs
4	Sabin Memorial FC	9	5	1	3	39	30	+9	16	Advance to Playoffs
5	Futsal 5 Dharan	9	4	2	3	36	36	0	14	
6	Machhindra Sky Goals	9	4	1	4	40	35	+5	13	
7	Dhuku Futsal Hub	9	4	1	4	40	41	−1	13	
8	Prabhatpheri Youth Club	9	3	1	5	40	47	−7	10	
9	Lumbini Futsal	9	1	1	7	23	42	−19	4	Relegated
10	Jharana Sports Club	9	0	0	9	18	59	−41	0	Relegated

Updated to match(es) played on 5 October 2021. Source: ANFA
Rules for classification: 1) points; 2) goal difference; 3) head-to-head goal difference; 4) number of goals scored; 5) superior goal-difference; 6) higher number of goals scored; 7) penalty kicks if both teams are on the field of play

=== Results ===
Home \ Away	DFH	F5D	LF	JSC	MSG	PYC	SMFC	SF	SCP	TRC
Dhuku Futsal Hub	—	—	5–2	5–3	7–5	—	8–6	—	—	3–5
Futsal 5 Dharan	5–3	—	—	—	—	2–6	—	3–3	2–3	—
Lumbini Futsal	—	0–0	—	6–2	4–5	—	2–3	—	—	5–6
Jharana Sports Club	—	5–9	—	—	—	3–7	1–7	—	—	—
Machhindra Sky Goals	—	7–3	—	8–0	—	—	2–3	—	3–8	—
Prabhatpheri Youth Club	4–4	—	6–1	—	3–4	—	—	4–7	—	6–11
Sabin Memorial FC	—	4–5	—	—	—	8–4	—	3–1	0–2	—
Sankhamul Futsal	6–2	—	3–2	7–0	2–2	—	—	—	—	5–2
Sports Castle Pokhara	5–3	—	12–1	1–5	—	—	—	2–2	—	—
The Rising Club Dharan	—	5–7	—	5–3	5–4	—	5–5	—	6–4	—

Updated to match(es) played on completed. Source: ANFA
Legend: Blue = home team win; Yellow = draw; Red = away team win.

=== Round robin ===
18 September 2021 1	The Rising Club Dharan	5-4	Machhindra Sky Goals	Pokhara
14:35 NST	Dorje Tamang 21'; Milan Limbu 22'; Sudip Gurung 22'; Rewosh Maskey 25,32'	Report	Sri Krishna Shrestha 13,30,35'; Aashish Sunam 26'	Stadium: Pokhara Multipurpose Covered Hall; Attendance: 500; Man of the Match: Rewosh Maskey (The Rising Club Dharan)

18 September 2021 2	Sports Castle Pokhara	7-0	Prabhapheri Youth Club	Pokhara
16:40 NST	Sumit Shrestha 3,24'; Khim Raj Gurung 6,21'; Bijay Gurung 7'; Anjan Devkota (yellow card) 22'; Sumit Shrestha (yellow card) 25'; Dipesh Ghale 25'; Kishor Gurung 34'	Report	Bibek Saru Magar (yellow card) 25'; Bishal Saru Magar (yellow card) 25'; Sunil Magar (yellow card) 25'	Stadium: Pokhara Multipurpose Covered Hall; Attendance: 800; Man of the Match: Biswash Poudel (Sports Castle Pokhara)

19 September 2021 3	Lumbini Futsal	6-2	Jharana Sports Club	Pokhara
12:40 NST	Geli Sherpa (yellow card) 4' (goal) 31'; Anjan Thapa 5'; Nischal Shahi Thakuri (yellow card) 6'; Raefi Maharjan 6'; Gyanendra Bidari (yellow card) 8'; Rupen Baraili 21,38'; Rozal Dahal 34'	Report	Mohan Bahadur Thapa Magar 27'; Amit Gurung 36'	Stadium: Pokhara Multipurpose Covered Hall; Attendance: 200; Man of the Match: Raefi Maharjan (Lumbini Futsal)

19 September 2021 4	Futsal 5 Dharan	3-3	Sankhamul Futsal	Pokhara
14:40 NST	Saroj Tamang (yellow card) 3' (goal) 34'; Probesh Joshi 20'; Dhiraj Tamang (yellow card) 28' (yellow-red card) 32'; Bijay Shrestha 30'; Kiran Chaudhary (yellow card) 30'	Report	Susaan Shrestha 3'; Krijal Khadka 11' (yellow card) 28'; Jenish Prajapati (yellow card) 26'; Laxman Thapa Magar 32'	Stadium: Pokhara Multipurpose Covered Hall; Attendance: 400; Man of the Match: Krijal Khadka (Sankhamul Futsal)

19 September 2021 5	Dhuku Futsal Hub	8-6	Sabin Memorial FC	Pokhara
16:40 NST	Urken Sherpa 18,18'; Abhay Rana 23,28' (yellow card) 32'; Pemba Nurbu Lama 27'; Bikrant Narsingh Rana 31,38'; Amit Lama 36'	Report	Sunil BK 8' (yellow card) 23'; Manish Sedai (yellow card) 14'; Abhinash Tamang 22,40'; Manish Chhetri 28,36'; Saroj Gurung (yellow card) 29' (goal) 30'	Stadium: Pokhara Multipurpose Covered Hall; Attendance: 800; Man of the Match: Urken Sherpa (Dhuku Futsal Hub)

20 September 2021 6	PrabhatPheri Youth Club	6-11	The Rising Club Dharan	Pokhara
12:40 NST	Srijesh Puri (yellow card) 8' (goal) 33'; Santa Lal Gurung (yellow card) 13'; Sijan Gurung 15'; Aashish Dangal (yellow card) 20'; Dhiraj Shrestha 29,34'; Dhiraj Joshi 35'; Raj Poudel 40'	Report	Rewosh Maskey 3,3,36' (yellow card) 5'; Biku Tamang 16,17,26' (yellow card) 14'; Dorje Tamang 20'; Sudip Gurung 25'; Milan Limbu 30'; Milan Rai 38,39' (yellow card) 38'	Stadium: Pokhara Multipurpose Covered Hall; Attendance: 200; Man of the Match: Biku Tamang (The Rising Club Dharan)

20 September 2021 7	Machhindra Sky Goals	8-0	Jharana Sports Club	Pokhara
14:40 NST	Anil Khadka 3'; Nirmal Gurung 4,11'; Sri Krishna Shrestha (yellow card) 6'; Prakash Mahatara 8,37'; Aashish Sunam 15' (yellow card) 36'; Sanjog Chamling 18'; Roshan Adhikari 36'	Report	Shankar Rai (yellow card) 10'; Om Prakash Thapa (yellow card) 14'	Stadium: Pokhara Multipurpose Covered Hall; Attendance: 200; Man of the Match: Nirmal Gurung (Machhindra Sky Goals)

21 September 2021 8	Sports Castle Pokhara	2-2	Sankhamul Futsal	Pokhara
12:40 NST	Kishor Gurung 6' (o.g.); Bhison Gurung 13'; Dipesh Ghale (yellow card) 18'; Khim Raj Gurung (yellow card) 20'; Anjan Devkota 34'	Report	Aruj Singh (yellow card) 3'; Mani Lama (yellow card) 5'; Susaan Shrestha (yellow card) 17'; Krijal Khadka (yellow card) 20'; Anish Shrestha (yellow card) 20'; Sabin Khadka (yellow card) 33'; Bibek Pandit 34' (yellow card) 34'	Stadium: Pokhara Multipurpose Covered Hall; Attendance: 700; Man of the Match: Bhison Gurung (Sports Castle Pokhara)

21 September 2021 9	Lumbini Futsal	2-3	Sabin Memorial FC	Pokhara
14:40 NST	Hemanta Gurung 15,29'; Dhiraj Pun Magar (yellow card) 26'	Report	Abhinash Tamang 6'; Manish Chhetri 8'; Saroj Gurung 35'	Stadium: Pokhara Multipurpose Covered Hall; Attendance: 700; Man of the Match: Saroj Gurung (Sabin Memorial FC)

21 September 2021 10	Futsal 5 Dharan	5-3	Dhuku Futsal Hub	Pokhara
16:40 NST	Kiran Chaudhary (yellow card) 3'; Saroj Tamang 7' (yellow card) 22'; Prabesh Joshi (yellow card) 23' (goal) 26,37'; Bijay Shrestha (yellow card) 28'; Ranjit Gurung 34'; Sandip Karki 37'	Report	Amit Lama 2'; Abhay Rana (yellow card) 5' (goal) 40'; Bikrant Narsingh Rana 32'	Stadium: Pokhara Multipurpose Covered Hall; Attendance: 400; Man of the Match: Sanjeeb Tamang (Futsal 5 Dharan)

22 September 2021 11	The Rising Club Dharan	5-3	Jharana Sports Club	Pokhara
14:40 NST	Dorje Tamang (yellow card) 5'; Biku Tamang (yellow card) 7' (goal) 26'; Milan Rai 9,29' (yellow card) 12'; Rewosh Maskey 22'; Milan Limbu 28'	Report	Mohan Bahadur Thapa Magar 11'; Prabesh Khanal Chhetri (yellow card) 19'; Om Prakash Thapa 27'; Bibek Thapa 35'	Stadium: Pokhara Multipurpose Covered Hall; Attendance: 200; Man of the Match: Rewosh Maskey (The Rising Club Dharan)

22 September 2021 12	PrabhatPheri Youth Club	4-7	Sankhamul Futsal	Pokhara
16:40 NST	Srijesh Puri 8,24'; Dhiraj Joshi 9,23'; Bibek Saru Magar (yellow card) 9' (yellow-red card) 33'	Report	Mani Lama 5,18'; Jenish Prajapati 7,29,34' (yellow card) 21'; Anish Shrestha 16'; Susaan Shrestha 23'	Stadium: Pokhara Multipurpose Covered Hall; Attendance: 300; Man of the Match: Mani Lama (Sankhamul Futsal)

23 September 2021 13	Machhindra Sky Goals	2-3	Sabin Memorial FC	Pokhara
12:40 NST	Aashish Sunam 2,30' (yellow card) 36' (yellow-red card) 38'; Manoj Rai (yellow card) 26'	Report	Abhinash Tamang 2,22'; Vardan Tangbe Lama 13'; Sanjay Jalari (yellow card) 28'; Manoj Gurung (yellow card) 37'	Stadium: Pokhara Multipurpose Covered Hall; Attendance: 400; Man of the Match: Abhinash Tamang (Sabin Memorial FC)

23 September 2021 14	Sports Castle Pokhara	5-3	Dhuku Futsal Hub	Pokhara
14:40 NST	Suraj Gurung (yellow card) 16'; Yogesh Gurung 22' (yellow card) 22'; Khim Raj Gurung 27,32'; Sumit Shrestha 29'; Dipesh Ghale 36'	Report	Bikrant Narsingh Rana 10,20' (yellow card) 21'; Urken Sherpa 12' (yellow card) 20'	Stadium: Pokhara Multipurpose Covered Hall; Attendance: 700; Man of the Match: Khim Raj Gurung (Sports Castle Pokhara)

23 September 2021 15	Lumbini Futsal	0-0	Futsal 5 Dharan	Pokhara
16:40 NST		Report		Stadium: Pokhara Multipurpose Covered Hall; Attendance: 300; Man of the Match: Bijay Shrestha(Futsal 5 Dharan)

24 September 2021 16	Sankhamul Futsal	5-2	The Rising Club Dharan	Pokhara
12:40 NST	Krijal Khadka 11,26'; Mani Lama 25'; Susaan Shrestha 28'; Aruj Singh 30'	Report	Biku Tamang (yellow card) 20'; Sachin Shrestha (yellow card) 20'; Nagen Rai 29'; Sudip Gurung 34'	Stadium: Pokhara Multipurpose Covered Hall; Attendance: 700; Man of the Match: Mani Lama (Sankhamul Futsal)

24 September 2021 17	Jharana Sports Club	1-7	Sabin Memorial FC	Pokhara
14:40 NST	Jitesh Gurung 6'	Report	Abhinash Tamang 4,7,8'; Sunil BK 22'; Manish Sedai 26,28'; Manoj Gurung 32'	Stadium: Pokhara Multipurpose Covered Hall; Attendance: 500; Man of the Match: Abhinash Tamang (Sabin Memorial FC)

24 September 2021 18	Prabhatpheri Youth Club	4-4	Dhuku Futsal Hub	Pokhara
16:40 NST	Dhiraj Joshi 18'; Santa Lal Gurung 25'; Srijesh Puri 32'; Dhiraj Shrestha 35'	Report	Bikrant Narsingh Rana 1,20'; Suman Tamang 37'; Abhay Rana 39'	Stadium: Pokhara Multipurpose Covered Hall; Attendance: 300; Man of the Match: Dhiraj Joshi (Prabhatpheri Youth Club)

25 September 2021 19	Machhindra Sky Goals	7-3	Futsal 5 Dharan	Pokhara
14:40 NST	Mision Lama 9,15'; Nirmal Gurung 11,12'; Sri Krishna Shrestha 31'; Amit Tamang 32'; Roshan Adhikari 38'	Report	Sandip Karki 13,39'; Ranjit Gurung 14'; Saroj Tamang (yellow card) 24'	Stadium: Pokhara Multipurpose Covered Hall; Attendance: 200; Man of the Match: Mision Lama (Machhindra Sky Goals)

25 September 2021 20	Sports Castle Pokhara	12-1	Lumbini Futsal	Pokhara
16:40 NST	Sumit Shrestha 5,23,25'; Bijay Gurung 6,7,37'; Kishor Gurung 10,28'; Bhison Gurung 13'; Suren Budha Magar 29'; Chhitiz Gurung 39'	Report	Rupen Baraili 27'; Sujan Thapa- 29' (o.g.); Bijay Pun Magar 37'	Stadium: Pokhara Multipurpose Covered Hall; Attendance: 500; Man of the Match: Sumit Shrestha (Sports Castle Pokhara)

26 September 2021 21	The Rising Club Dharan	5-5	Sabin Memorial FC	Pokhara
14:40 NST	Sudip Gurung 10,25,39'; Hemanta Thapa Magar 12,26' (yellow card) 37'; Sachin Shrestha (yellow card) 34'	Report	Abhinash Tamang 5,9'; Manish Chhetri 9,22'; Sunil BK 32'	Stadium: Pokhara Multipurpose Covered Hall; Attendance: 400; Man of the Match: Sachin Shrestha (The Rising Club Dharan)

26 September 2021 22	Sankhamul Futsal	6-2	Dhuku Futsal Hub	Pokhara
16:40 NST	Susaan Shrestha 4,11'; Jenish Prajapati 14'; Aruj Singh 25'; Mani Lama 28'; Krijal Khadka 28'	Report	Subrat Narsingh KC 21'; Amit Lama 31'	Stadium: Pokhara Multipurpose Covered Hall; Attendance: 200; Man of the Match: Krijal Khadka (Sankhamul Futsal)

27 September 2021 23	Jharana Sports Club	5-9	Futsal 5 Dharan	Pokhara
12:40 NST	Ganga Gurung 3,6'; Narayan Thapa Magar 20,31,37'	Report	Ranjit Gurung 4,9'; Kiran Chaudhary (yellow card) 5'; Sandip Karki 5,28,33,36'; Sujan Khadka 9'; Nirav Khadka 36'; Bishwojeet Rai 37'	Stadium: Pokhara Multipurpose Covered Hall; Attendance: 150; Man of the Match: Sandip Karki (Futsal 5 Dharan)

27 September 2021 24	Prabhatpheri Youth Club	6-1	Lumbini Futsal	Pokhara
14:40 NST	Dhiraj Joshi 7'; Santa Lal Gurung 9'; Bishal Saru Magar 9'; Srijesh Puri 18' (yellow card) 32'; Aashish Dangal 23'; Subil Shrestha 27'	Report	Hemanta Gurung 32'; Rupen Baraili 40'	Stadium: Pokhara Multipurpose Covered Hall; Attendance: 200; Man of the Match: Bishal Saru Magar (Prabhatpheri Youth Club)

27 September 2021 25	Machhindra Sky Goals	3-8	Sports Castle Pokhara	Pokhara
16:40 NST	Roshan Adhikari (yellow card) 10' (goal) 36'; Suvet Lama (yellow card) 33'; Manoj Lama 34'	Report	Sumit Shrestha 11,36' (yellow card) 36'; Bishon Gurung 21'; Khim Raj Gurung 25,38'; Yogesh Gurung OG 27' (yellow card) 20'; Dipesh Ghale 30'; Bijay Gurung 35'; Kishor Gurung 36'	Stadium: Pokhara Multipurpose Covered Hall; Attendance: 400; Man of the Match: Suraj Gurung (Sports Castle Pokhara)

28 September 2021 26	Dhuku Futsal Hub	3-5	The Rising Club Dharan	Pokhara
14:40 NST	Amit Lama 8'; Prasiddha Magar 28'; Raunak Lal Shrestha (yellow card) 32'; Nishan Ramjhali (yellow card) 34'; Abhay Rana 35'; Suman Tamang (yellow card) 36'	Report	Milan Rai (yellow card) 18' (goal) 35,36'; Hemanta Thapa Magar 25'; Kesar Limbu (yellow card) 31'; Sudip Gurung 34'; Bibek Rai 35'; Rewosh Maskey (yellow card) 38'	Stadium: Pokhara Multipurpose Covered Hall; Attendance: 150; Man of the Match: Biku Tamang (The Rising Club Dharan)

28 September 2021 27	Sabin Memorial FC	4-5	Futsal 5 Dharan	Pokhara
16:40 NST	Manoj Gurung 1'; Abhinash Tamang 2,12'; Anup Rana Magar 4'	Report	Ranjit Gurung 4'; Prabesh Joshi 17,32'; Bijay Shrestha 32,36'	Stadium: Pokhara Multipurpose Covered Hall; Attendance: 300; Man of the Match: Bijay Shrestha (Futsal 5 Dharan)

29 September 2021 28	Sankhamul Futsal	3-2	Lumbini Futsal	Pokhara
12:40 NST	Bibek Pandit 8'; Krijal Khadka 13'; Sagar Theeng 30'	Report	Rupen Baraili 9'; Raefi Maharjan 40'	Stadium: Pokhara Multipurpose Covered Hall; Attendance: 100; Man of the Match: Susaan Shrestha (Sankhamul Futsal)

29 September 2021 29	Jharana Sports Club	1-5	Sports Castle Pokhara	Pokhara
14:40 NST	Ganga Gurung (yellow card) 28'; Narayan Thapa Magar 29'	Report	Bijay Gurung 5'; Khim Raj Gurung 14,18'; Bhison Gurung 15'; Kishor Gurung 16'	Stadium: Pokhara Multipurpose Covered Hall; Attendance: 300; Man of the Match: Bijay Gurung (Sports Castle Pokhara)

29 September 2021 30	Prabhatpheri Youth Club	3-4	Machhindra Sky Goals	Pokhara
16:40 NST	Santa Lal Gurung 1' (o.g.); Bishal Saru Magar 7,9' (yellow card) 38'; Akhilesh Karki 32'	Report	Nirmal Gurung 8' (yellow card) 21'; Sri Krishna Shrestha 23'; Aashish Sunam 24'	Stadium: Pokhara Multipurpose Covered Hall; Attendance: 100; Man of the Match: Laxman Thapa (Machhindra Sky Goals)

30 September 2021 31	The Rising Club Dharan	5-7	Futsal 5 Dharan	Pokhara
14:40 NST	Sudip Gurung 4,8'; Sachin Shrestha (red card) 19'; Dorje Tamang 20'; Milan Rai 24'; Hemanta Thapa Magar 29'	Report	Sandip Karki (yellow card) 10' (yellow-red card) 18'; Bijay Shrestha 17,20'; Saroj Tamang 35,36,36'; Ranjit Gurung 37'; Prabesh Joshi 38'	Stadium: Pokhara Multipurpose Covered Hall; Attendance: 100; Man of the Match: Saroj Tamang (Futsal 5 Dharan)

30 September 2021 32	Dhuku Futsal Hub	5-2	Lumbini Futsal	Pokhara
16:40 NST	Prasiddha Magar 31,35'; Bikrant Narsingh Rana 36,37'; Abhay Rana 37'	Report	Anoj Gaire 24,29'	Stadium: Pokhara Multipurpose Covered Hall; Attendance: 100; Man of the Match: Bikrant Narsingh Rana (Dhuku Futsal Hub)

1 October 2021 33	Sabin Memorial FC	0-2	Sports Castle Pokhara	Pokhara
12:40 NST	Sanjay Jalari (yellow card) 17' (yellow-red card) 37'; Samir Pradhan (yellow card) 36'	Report	Suraj Gurung 17'; Kishor Gurung 34'	Stadium: Pokhara Multipurpose Covered Hall; Attendance: 800; Man of the Match: Biswas Poudel (Sports Castle Pokhara)

1 October 2021 34	Sankhamul Futsal	2-2	Machhindra Sky Goals	Pokhara
14:40 NST	Krijal Khadka 8' (yellow card) 26'; Sabin Khadka (yellow card) 14'; Aruj Singh 27'	Report	Aashish Sunam 22'; Mision Lama 30'; Sri Krishna Shrestha (yellow card) 31'	Stadium: Pokhara Multipurpose Covered Hall; Attendance: 200; Man of the Match: Aruj Singh (Sankhamul Futsal)

1 October 2021 35	Jharana Sports Club	3-7	Prabhatpheri Youth Club	Pokhara
16:40 NST	Prem Chhantyal 4'; Jitesh Gurung 9'	Report	Srijesh Puri 1' (o.g.), 20'; Sijan Gurung 14,29'; Akhilesh Karki 18'; Santa Lal Gurung 23'; Nabin Lama 25'; Dhiraj Joshi 31'	Stadium: Pokhara Multipurpose Covered Hall; Attendance: 100; Man of the Match: Nabin Lama (Prabhatpheri Youth Club)

2 October 2021 36	Lumbini Futsal	5-6	The Rising Club Dharan	Pokhara
14:40 NST	Hemanta Gurung 4'; Raefi Maharjan 14' (yellow card) 28'; Sujan Thapa 15'; Rupen Baraili 22' (yellow card) 40'; Devashish Sharma 34'; Nischal Shahi Thakuri (red card) 39'	Report	Biku Tamang 10'; Sudip Gurung 16'; Milan Rai 16'; Dorje Tamang 20'; Rewosh Maskey 27'; Hemanta Thapa Magar 30'	Stadium: Pokhara Multipurpose Covered Hall; Attendance: 100; Man of the Match: Rewosh Maskey (The Rising Club Dharan)

2 October 2021 37	Futsal 5 Dharan	2-3	Sports Castle Pokhara	Pokhara
16:40 NST	Kiran Chaudhary 1' (24); Ranjit Gurung (yellow card) 6'; Dhiraj Tamang (yellow card) 11' (yellow-red card) 40'; Saroj Tamang (yellow card) 19'; Bijay Shrestha (yellow card) 26'; Prabesh Joshi (yellow card) 32'; Sujan Khadka (red card) 40'	Report	Suren Budha Magar 10'; Sumit Shrestha 37'; Anjan Devkota 40'	Stadium: Pokhara Multipurpose Covered Hall; Attendance: 200; Man of the Match: Biswas Poudel (Sports Castle Pokhara)

3 October 2021 38	Dhuku Futsal Hub	7-5	Machhindra Sky Goals	Pokhara
12:40 NST	Bikrant Narsingh Rana 2,14,18,22'\; Urken Sherpa 4'; Prasiddha Magar 27'; Amit Lama 33'	Report	Sanjog Chamling 2'; Ashish Sunam 15'; Manoj Rai 26'; Amit Tamang 29,40'; Sri Krishna Shrestha (yellow card) 37'	Stadium: Pokhara Multipurpose Covered Hall; Attendance: 50; Man of the Match: Bikrant Narsingh Rana (Dhuku Futsal Hub)

3 October 2021 39	Sabin Memorial FC	8-4	Prabhatpheri Youth Club	Pokhara
14:40 NST	Abhinash Tamang 5,12,12,22,23,30'; Manoj Gurung (yellow card) 16' (goal) 31,40'	Report	Akhilesh Karki 6'; Dona Thapa 11,39'; Bibek Saru Magar (yellow card) 13'; Nabin Lama 18'	Stadium: Pokhara Multipurpose Covered Hall; Attendance: 150; Man of the Match: Abhinash Tamang (Sabin Memorial FC)

3 October 2021 40	Sankhamul Futsal	7-0	Jharana Sports Club	Pokhara
16:40 NST	Krijal Khadka 7'; Jenish Prajapati 12,15,35'; Aruj Singh 25'; Sabin Khadka 33'; Yugesh Shrestha 39'		Bibek Thapa (yellow card) 25'	Stadium: Pokhara Multipurpose Covered Hall; Attendance: 50; Man of the Match: Jenish Prajapati (Sankhamul Futsal)

4 October 2021 41	The Rising Club Dharan	6-4	Sports Castle Pokhara	Pokhara
12:40 NST	Sudip Gurung 4'; Rewosh Maskey 5'; Bishan Shrestha 11'; Milan Rai 19,36'; Biku Tamang 31'	Report	Sumit Shrestha 8'; Suren Budha Magar 19'; Kishor Gurung 28'; Dipesh Ghale 40'-	Stadium: Pokhara Multipurpose Covered Hall; Attendance: 100; Man of the Match: Dorje Tamang (The Rising Club Dharan)

4 October 2021 42	Lumbini Futsal	4-5	Machhindra Sky Goals	Pokhara
14:40 NST	Samir Magar 19' (o.g.); Devashish Sharma 20'; Rupen Baraili 23'; Sujan Thapa 32,39'	Report	Manoj Rai 13'; Sabin KC 14'; Suvet Lama 27'; Dipsen Thakuri 30'	Stadium: Pokhara Multipurpose Covered Hall; Attendance: 50; Man of the Match: Suvet Lama (Machhindra Sky Goals)

5 October 2021 43	Futsal 5 Dharan	2-6	Prabhatpheri Youth Club	Pokhara
12:40 NST	Sandip Karki 20'; Nayal Shrestha 30'	Report	Dhiraj Joshi 5,5' (yellow card) 23'; Santa Lal Gurung 17'; Dona Thapa 25,40'; Bibek Saru Magar 26'	Stadium: Pokhara Multipurpose Covered Hall; Attendance: 100; Man of the Match: Aashish Dangal (Prabhatpheri Youth Club)

5 October 2021 44	Dhuku Futsal Hub	5-3	Jharana Sports Club	Pokhara
14:40 NST	Dawa Dukpa Sherpa 2'; Suman Tamang 20'; Urken Sherpa 21'; Prasiddha Magar 27'; Amit Lama 38'	Report	Ganga Gurung 8'; Prabesh Khanal Chhetri 32'; Amit Gurung 37'	Stadium: Pokhara Multipurpose Covered Hall; Attendance: 100; Man of the Match: Amit Lama (Dhuku Futsal Hub)

5 October 2021 45	Sabin Memorial FC	3-1	Sankhamul Futsal	Pokhara
16:40 NST	Samir Pradhan 20'; Manish Chhetri 24'; Sunil BK 34'	Report	Anish Shrestha (yellow card) 20'; Mani Lama (yellow card) 23'; Susaan Shrestha 25'	Stadium: Pokhara Multipurpose Covered Hall; Attendance: 800; Man of the Match: Manish Chhetri (Sabin Memorial FC)

== Playoffs ==
=== Bracket ===
Preliminary
1	Sports Castle Pokhara	8
2	The Rising Club Dharan	6
3	Sankhamul Futsal	3
4	Sabin Memorial FC	2

Preliminary
Q1L	The Rising Club Dharan	3
EW	Sankhamul Futsal	4

Final
Q1W	Sports Castle Pokhara	4
Q2W	Sankhamul Futsal	2

=== Preliminary ===
6 October 2021 Qualifier 1	Sports Castle Pokhara	8-6	The Rising Club Dharan	Pokhara
12:40 NST	Kishor Gurung 4,28,40'; Bijay Gurung 6'; Sumit Shrestha 28,34,40' (yellow card) 40'; Suraj Gurung (yellow card) 38' (goal) 39'	Report	Hemanta Thapa Magar 9,23' (yellow card) 36'; Milan Rai 12,31'; Sudip Gurung 13,32'; Kesar Limbu (yellow card) 18'; Rewosh Maskey (yellow card) 36'	Stadium: Pokhara Multipurpose Covered Hall; Attendance: 600; Referee: Kishor Gurung (Sports Castle Pokhara)

6 October 2021 Eliminator	Sankhamul Futsal	3-2	Sports Castle Pokhara	Pokhara
14:40NST	Jenish Prajapati 11'; Krijal Khadka 24,30'; Mani Lama (yellow card) 34'	Report	Sanjay Jalari (yellow card) 21' (yellow-red card) 25'; Saroj Gurung 27'; Manoj Gurung 35'	Stadium: Pokhara Multipurpose Covered Hall; Attendance: 400; Man of the Match: AnisH Shrestha (Sankhamul Futsal)

7 October 2021 Qualifier 2	The Rising Club Dharan	3-4 (a.e.t.)	Sankhamul Futsal	Pokhara
12:40 NST	Bishan Shrestha 11,28'; Rewosh Maskey (yellow card) 20' (yellow-red card) 47'; Hemanta Thapa Magar 24' (yellow card) 48'; Nagen Rai (red card) 48'	Report	Mani Lama 1,15,40,3(e.t.)'; Bibek Pandit (yellow card) 20'; Susaan Shrestha (yellow card) 25'; Aruj Singh (yellow card) 28'	Stadium: Pokhara Multipurpose Covered Hall; Attendance: 300; Man of the Match: Mani Lama (Sankhamul Futsal)

=== Final ===
8 October 2021 Final	Sports Castle Pokhara	4-2	Sankhamul Futsal	Pokhara
12:40 NST	Bijay Gurung 5'; Kishor Gurung 20,21,39'		Laxman Thapa Magar 10'; Mani Lama 22'	Stadium: Pokhara Multipurpose Covered Hall; Man of the Match: Kishor Gurung (Sports Castle Pokhara)

== Season Statistics ==
=== Top Scorer ===
==== Hattrick ====
As of 8 October 2021

Player	For	Against	Result	Date
Sri Krishna Shrestha	Machhindra Sky Goals	The Rising Club Dharan	4-5	18 September 2021
Rewosh Maskey	The Rising Club Dharan	Prabhatpheri Youth Club	11-6	20 September 2021
Biku Tamang	The Rising Club Dharan	Prabhatpheri Youth Club	11-6	20 September 2021
Jenish Prajapati	Sankhamul Futsal	Prabhatpheri Youth Club	7-4	22 September 2021
Abhinash Tamang	Sabin Memorial FC	Jharana Sports Club	7-1	24 September 2021
Sumit Shrestha	Sports Castle Pokhara	Lumbini Futsal	12-1	25 September 2021
Bijay Gurung	Sports Castle Pokhara	Lumbini Futsal	12-1	25 September 2021
Sudip Gurung	The Rising Club Dharan	Sabin Memorial FC	5-5	26 September 2021
Narayan Thapa Magar	Jharana Sports Club	Futsal 5 Dharan	5-9	27 September 2021
Sandip Karki	Futsal 5 Dharan	Jharana Sports Club	9-5	27 September 2021
Saroj Tamang	Futsal 5 Dharan	The Rising Club Dharan	7-5	30 September 2021
Bikrant Narsingh Rana	Dhuku Futsal Hub	Machhindra Sky Goals	7-5	3 October 2021
Abhinash Tamang	Sabin Memorial FC	Prabhatpheri Youth Club	8-4	3 October 2021
Jenish Prajapati	Sankhamul Futsal	Jharana Sports Club	7-0	3 October 2021
Kishor Gurung	Sports Castle Pokhara	The Rising Club Dharan	8-6	6 October 2021
Sumit Shrestha	Sports Castle Pokhara	The Rising Club Dharan	8-6	6 October 2021
Kishor Gurung	Sports Castle Pokhara	Sankhamul Futsal	4-2	8 October 2021

=== Discipline ===
==== Player ====
As of 5 October 2021

- Most yellow cards: 4
  - Saroj Tamang (Futsal 5 Dharan)
- Most red cards: 2
  - Dhiraj Tamang (Futsal 5 Dharan)

==== Club ====
As of 7 October 2021

- Most yellow cards: 18
  - Sankhamul Futsal
- Most red cards: 4
  - Futsal 5 Dharan

== Awards ==
=== End-of-season awards ===
Award	Winner	Club
Goalkeeper	Anish Shrestha	Sankhamul Futsal
Ala (Winger)	Mani Lama	Sankhamul Futsal
Fixo (Defender)	Bijay Shrestha	Futsal 5 Dharan
Emerging Player	Sumit Shrestha	Sports Castle Pokhara
Best Coach	Bishnu Gurung	Sports Castle Pokhara
