= 'A' Division National Futsal League =

- Organising body: ANFA
- Founded: 2021
- Country: Nepal
- Divisions: 1
- Number of clubs: 10
- Current champions: Sports Castle Pokhara (1st title) (2021)
- Broadcaster(s): Kantipur TV
- Website: www.the-anfa.com
- Current: 2021 'A' Division National Futsal League

The 'A' Division National Futsal League is the professional futsal league in Nepal league organised by Turnpike Event Pvt Ltd in technical support with ANFA. It was founded in 2021 and consists of 10 teams.

== History ==
=== Background ===
All Nepal Football Association ANFA announced the creation of 'A' Division Futsal League on 25 January 2021. A total of 10 teams, two teams from Province 1 and Gandaki Province, one from Province 2, for from Bagmati Province and one team representing Lumbini, Karnali and Sudurpashim provinces, takes part in the competition organized by ANFA Futsal Committee.

== Organisation ==
=== Tournament format ===
The season consists of two stages, the league stage and the knockout stage. The league stage follows a double round-robin format, with each club playing the others twice. At the conclusion of the league stage, the top four teams will qualify for the playoffs. The top two teams from the league phase will play against each other in the first Qualifying match, with the winner going straight to the final and the loser getting another chance to qualify for the final by playing the second Qualifying match. Meanwhile, the third and fourth place teams from league phase play against each other in an eliminator match and the winner from that match will play the loser from the first Qualifying match. The winner of the second Qualifying match will move onto the final to play the winner of the first Qualifying match in the Final match, where the winner will be crowned the 'A' Division National Futsal League champions.

=== Futsal League rules ===
If two or more teams are tied in the league stage, the following rules are applied according to the AFC futsal competition regulations:

1. Higher number of points obtained in the group matches between the participating clubs in question
2. Superior goal-difference from the group matches between the participating clubs in question
3. Higher number of goals scored in the group matches between the participating clubs in question
4. Superior goal-difference from all group matches played
5. Higher number of goals scored from all group matches played
6. Kicks from the penalty mark only if two participating clubs are involved and they are both on the field of play

=== Prize money ===
For the inaugural season, ANFA has offered a total prize of Rs. 1.5 million, where the winner will take the cash prize of Rs 1 million and first runner-up will take the prize of Rs 500,000.

== Teams ==
=== Current teams ===
| Team | City | Province |
|---|---|---|
| Dhuku Futsal Hub | Kathmandu | Bagmati |
| Futsal 5 Dharan | Dharan | Koshi |
| Jharana Sports Club | Butwal | Lumbini |
| Lumbini Futsal | Butwal | Lumbini |
| Machhindra Sky Goals | Kathmandu | Bagmati |
| Prabhatpheri Youth Club | Kathmandu | Bagmati |
| Sabin Memorial FC | Pokhara | Gandaki |
| Sankhamul Futsal | Kathmandu | Bagmati |
| Sports Castle Pokhara | Pokhara | Gandaki |
| The Rising Club Dharan | Dharan | Koshi |

=== Champions ===
| S.N. | Season | Winner | Top Scorer |
|---|---|---|---|
| 1 | 2021 | Sports Castle Pokhara | Abhinash Tamang |

== Broadcasting ==
Kantipur TV held the broadcasting right for the inaugural season of 'A' Division National Futsal League. As per the agreement, the matches will be shown live via Kantipur Television and its digital platforms Ekantipur.com and their YouTube channels.
