= Rinzin Dorji (athlete) =

Bhutanese runner

Personal information
- Full name: Rinzin Dorji
- Nationality: Bhutanese
- Born: Bhutan

Sport
- Sport: Track and field
- Event: long-distance running

Rinzin Dorji (born 1976) also known as Rinzin Rinzin, is a runner from Pam village in Trashigang, Bhutan. He is the first Bhutanese runner to participate in the New York Marathon.

He is not related to Rinzin Dorji who is a member of the National Council of Bhutan which is the upper house of Bhutan bicameral Parliament. Rinzin worked for Amankora resort as a guide in Paro and would sometimes accompany his guests in the short run. He worked at Amankora from 2004 to May 2010 and quit to pursue a marathon because he felt running provided an opportunity for him. His passion to run was identified by a tourist named Ynaar who is an active member of New York Road Runners, the organizers of the New York City Marathon. Ynaar and Rinzin Dorji used to run together in Bhutan distances up to 20 km. In May 2010, Rinzin Dorji went to New York on invitation from Ynaar to qualify for the New York City Marathon, which he succeeded. Ynaar trained him every day using various routines, which even included cycling and swimming. A coach from Bhutan came to help them before the marathon. Rinzin finished the run in four hours and received a medal and certificate for his participation. He dedicated his run to the coronation of the new king of Bhutan and tsa-wa-sum. After the race he went back to Bhutan to train for next year's marathon. Bhutan Olympic Committee has not officially recognized him. Bhutan has been in the Olympics seven times since the Olympic Committee formation. Bhutan has not yet sent a runner to compete in track in the field as Bhutan only sends archers and has never won a medal in any games. Mary Wittenberg the President of the New York City Road Runners who organize the race sent her congratulations to Rinzin for representing Bhutan and finishing.
