= Gandaki Province Football Association =

Local football governing body in Nepal

- गण्डकी प्रदेश फुटबल संघ
- Official Logo of the GPFA
- Sport: Football
- Jurisdiction: Province
- Membership: 10 district association
- Abbreviation: GPFA
- Founded: 2019; 7 years ago
- Affiliation: All Nepal Football Association (ANFA)
- Headquarters: Pokhara
- President: Dipendra Shrestha

Official website
- the-anfa.com/state-football/4
- (Nepal)

Gandaki Province Football Association, (formerly known as Province No. 4 Football Association) and also known as Gandaki Province FA is a Nepali provincial football Association, based in the Gandaki Province of Nepal. It sends men's state team for National Games and women's team for National Women's League.

== Affiliated District Football Boards ==
There are currently 10 district football associations affiliated with Gandaki Province Football Association.

District Football Associations

- Baglung District Football Association
- Gorkha District Football Association
- Kaski District Football Association
- Lamjung District Football Association
- Manang District Football Association
- Nawalparasi District Football Association
- Nawalpur District Football Association
- Palpa District Football Association
- Syangja District Football Association
- Tanahu District Football Association

== Teams ==
=== Gandaki Province FA teams ===
Club	League
Gandaki Province men's football team	National Games
Gandaki Province women's football team	National Women's League
