= Pankaj Bikram Nembang =

- पंकज विक्रम नेम्वाङ
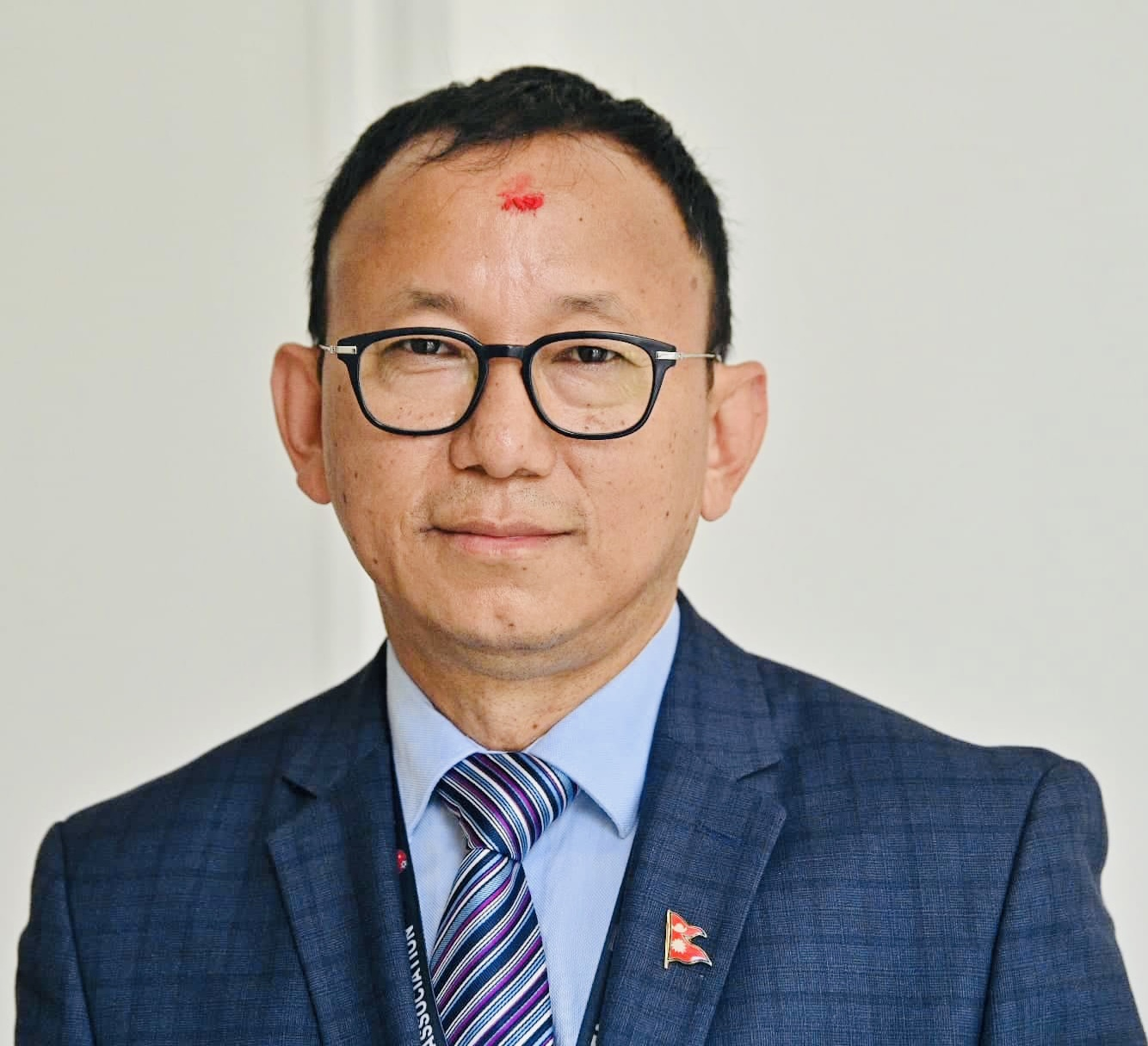

Deputy Chairperson of AFC Development Committee
- Incumbent
- Assumed office 15 February 2023
- Preceded by: Mariano V. Araneta Jr.

President of ANFA
- Incumbent
- Assumed office 21 June 2022
- Preceded by: Karma Tsering Sherpa

Personal details
- Born: 3 January 1972 (age 54) Jhapa
- Spouse: Deepkala Lingden Nembang
- Parents: Narendra Bikram Nembang (father); Ratna Kumari Nembang (mother)

Pankaj Bikram Nembang (Nepali: पंकज विक्रम नेम्वाङ, born 3 January 1972) is the current president of the All Nepal Football Association (ANFA).
