= Koshi Province football team =

Koshi Province
- Full name: Koshi Province football team
- Founded: 2019; 6 years ago
- Owner: Koshi Province Football Association
- League: National Games
- Website: koshiprovincefootball.org.np
Away colours

Koshi Province football team, (formerly known as Province No. 1 football team) and also known as Team Koshi is a Nepali provincial football team, based in the Koshi Province of Nepal. The team plays association football in the National Games Nepal, which is the top tier professional men's football competition in Nepal.
