= Bagmati Province football team =

Bagmati Province
- Nickname(s): BP
- League: National Women's League

Personnel
- Chairman: Rajendra Kumar Shrestha
- Owner: Bagmati Province Football Association

Team information
- City: Hetauda
- Established: 2019

History
- wins: 0
- wins: 0
- Official website: koshiprovincefootball.org.np

Bagmati Province football team, (formerly known as Province No. 3 football team) and also known as Team Bagmati is a Nepali provincial football team, based in the Bagmati Province of Nepal. The team plays association football in the National Games.
