= Karnali Province Football Association =

Nepalese province football association

- कर्णाली प्रदेश फुटबल संघ
- Official Logo of the KFA
- Sport: Football
- Jurisdiction: Province
- Membership: 2 district association
- Abbreviation: KFA
- Founded: 2019; 7 years ago
- Affiliation: All Nepal Football Association (ANFA)
- Headquarters: Birendranagar
- President: Pramod Hamal

Official website
- the-anfa.com/state-football/6
- (Nepal)

Karnali Province Football Association, (formerly known as Province No. 6 Football Association) and also known as Karnali Province FA is a Nepali provincial football Association, based in the Karnali Province of Nepal. It sends men's state team for National Games and women's team for National Women's League.

Recently KFA organized National Women's League qualifier with Surkhet FA in Surkhet.

== Affiliated District Football Boards ==
There are currently 2 district football associations affiliated with Karnali Province Football Association.

District Football Associations

- Jumla District Football Association
- Surkhet District Football Association

== Teams ==
=== Karnali Province FA teams ===
Club	League
Karnali Province men's football team	National Games
Karnali Province women's football team	National Women's League
