= Madhesh Province Football Association =

Nepalese province football association

- मधेश प्रदेश फुटबल संघ
- Official Logo of the MPFA
- Sport: Football
- Jurisdiction: Province
- Membership: 8 district association
- Abbreviation: MPFA
- Founded: 2019; 7 years ago
- Affiliation: All Nepal Football Association (ANFA)
- Headquarters: Janakpurdham
- President: Nepal Karki

Official website
- the-anfa.com/state-football/2
- (Nepal)

Madhesh Province Football Association, (formerly known as Province No. 2 Football Association) and also known as Madhesh Football is a Nepali provincial football Association under the All Nepal Football Association (ANFA), based in the Madhesh Province of Nepal. It sends men's state team for National Games and women's team for National Women's League.

== Affiliated District Football Boards ==
There are currently 8 district football associations affiliated with Madhesh Province Football Association.

District Football Associations

- Bara District Football Association
- Dhanusha District Football Association
- Mahottari District Football Association
- Parsa District Football Association
- Rautahat District Football Association
- Saptari District Football Association
- Sarlahi District Football Association
- Siraha District Football Association

== Teams ==
=== Madhesh Province FA teams ===
| Club | League |
|---|---|
| Madhesh Province men's football team | National Games |
| Madhesh Province women's football team | National Women's League |
