= Madhesh Province football team =

Madhesh Province
- Nickname(s): MP
- League: National Women's League

Personnel
- Chairman: Nepal Karki
- Owner: Madhesh Province Football Association

Team information
- City: Janakpur
- Established: 2019

History
- wins: 0
- wins: 0
- Official website: madheshprovincefootball.org.np

Madhesh Province football team, (formerly known as Province No. 2 football team) and also known as Team Madhesh is a Nepali provincial football team, based in the Madhesh Province of Nepal. The team plays association football in the National Games.
