= Bagmati Province Football Association =

Nepalese province football association

- बागमती प्रदेश फुटबल संघ
- Official Logo of the BPFA
- Sport: Football
- Jurisdiction: Province
- Membership: 11 district association
- Abbreviation: BPFA
- Founded: 2019; 7 years ago
- Affiliation: All Nepal Football Association (ANFA)
- Headquarters: Hetauda
- President: Rajendra Kumar Shrestha

Official website
- the-anfa.com/state-football/3
- (Nepal)

Bagmati Province Football Association, (formerly known as Province No. 3 Football Association) and also known as Bagmati Province FA is a Nepali provincial football Association, based in the Bagmati Province of Nepal. It sends men's state team for National Games and women's team for National Women's League.

It organized Referee Course on regular interval of time to broaden the capacity and quality of football in the province. Also, Bagmati Province organized Bagmati Province League Football championship annually.

== Affiliated district football associations ==
There are currently 11 district football associations affiliated with Bagmati Province Football Association.

No.	Association	District	President
1	Bhaktapur District Football Association	Bhaktapur	Rupesh Dhaubyanjar
2	Chitwan District Football Association	Chitwan	Shree Krishna Karki
3	Dhading District Football Association	Dhading	Dipak Khatiwoda
4	Dolakha District Football Association	Dolakha	Kaurab Pandey
5	Kathmandu District Football Association	Kathmandu	Birat Jung Shahi
6	Kavre District Football Association	Kavre	Rojan Yogal
7	Lalitpur District Football Association	Lalitpur	Purusottam Thapa
8	Makwanpur District Football Association	Makwanpur	Tikaram Lama`
9	Nuwakot District Football Association	Nuwakot	Dev Narayan Chitrakar
10	Sindhuli District Football Association	Sindhuli	Suresh Thapa
11	Sindhupalchowk District Football Association	Sindhupalchowk	Amrit Shrestha

== Teams ==
=== Gandaki Province FA teams ===
Club	League
Bagmati Province men's football team	National Games
Bagmati Province women's football team	National Women's League

== Bagmati Province League Championship ==
SN	Club	District	Year	Ref
1	Chitlang Football Club	Kathmandu	2024 (2081 BS)	
2	Makwanpur District FA	Makwanpur	2023(2080 BS)	
