= Lumbini Province Football Association =

Nepalese province football association

- लुम्बिनी प्रदेश फुटबल संघ
- Official Logo of the LPFA
- Sport: Football
- Jurisdiction: Province
- Membership: 4 district association
- Abbreviation: LPFA
- Founded: 2019; 7 years ago
- Affiliation: All Nepal Football Association (ANFA)
- Headquarters: Butwal
- President: Bhupendra Bikram Thapa

Official website
- the-anfa.com/state-football/5
- (Nepal)

Lumbini Province Football Association, (formerly known as Province No. 5 Football Association) and also known as Lumbini Province FA is a Nepali provincial football Association, based in the Lumbini Province of Nepal. It sends men's state team for National Games and women's team for National Women's League.

Lumbini Province FA also conduct different grassroot programs and section tournament for the various level of national team i.e. Junior as well as Senior national team.

== Affiliated District Football Boards ==
There are currently 4 district football associations affiliated with Lumbini Province Football Association.

District Football Associations

- Banke District Football Association
- Bardiya District Football Association
- Dang District Football Association
- Rupandehi District Football Association

== Teams ==
=== Lumbini Province FA teams ===
Club	League
Lumbini Province men's football team	National Games
Lumbini Province women's football team	National Women's League
