= Koshi Province Football Association =

Nepalese province football association

- काेशी प्रदेश फुटबल संघ
- Sport: Football
- Jurisdiction: Province
- Membership: 11 district association
- Abbreviation: KPFA
- Founded: 2019; 7 years ago
- Affiliation: All Nepal Football Association (ANFA)
- Headquarters: Dharan
- President: Kishor Rai

Official website
- the-anfa.com/state-football/1
- (Nepal)

Koshi Province Football Association, (formerly known as Province No. 1 Football Association) and also known as Koshi Province FA is a Nepali provincial football association, based in the Koshi Province of Nepal. It sends men's state team for National Games and women's team for National Women's League.

== Affiliated District Football Boards ==
There are currently 11 district football associations affiliated with Koshi Province Football Association.

District Football Associations

- Bhojpur District Football Association
- Dhankuta District Football Association
- Ilam District Football Association
- Jhapa District Football Association
- Khotang District Football Association
- Morang District Football Association
- Panchthar District Football Association
- Sankhuwasabha District Football Association
- Taplejung District Football Association
- Udayapur District Football Association
- Sunsari District Football Association

== Teams ==
=== Koshi Province FA teams ===
Club	League
Koshi Province men's football team	National Games
Koshi Province women's football team	National Women's League
