= Nepal Police F.C. =

Police sporting club of nepal

Nepal Police
- Nickname: The Cops
- Founded: 1952; 74 years ago
- Stadium: Nepal Police Academy, Maharjgunj, Kathmandu
- Owner: Nepal Police
- League: Martyr's Memorial A-Division; Nepal National League (sometimes)
- 2023: Martyr's Memorial A-Division League, 3rd of 14
- Website: www.nepalpolice.gov.np
Home colours	Away colours

Nepal Police Football Club (previously known as Mahendra Police Club) is a professional football section of the Nepal Police Club. It currently plays in the Martyr's Memorial A-Division League. The team has won three A-Division titles and one National League title.

== History ==
Established in 1952 and named after King Mahendra Bir Bikram Shah Dev, Mahendra Police Club has been part of the new national league since its inception in 2003. The club finished runners-up in the 2004–05 season and were third in the following year.

=== 2007 ===
The year 2007 was a successful year for Mahendra Police Club. They started well in the 2006–07 season with a blend of experienced and amateur players and clinched the Martyr's Memorial A-Division League title. MPC has been the runners-up in the 2007 AFC President's Cup after creating an upset in the semi-finals by beating Regar Tursunzoda.

== Record by seasons ==
Champions	Runners-up	Third place	Promoted	Relegated

Season	Division	Teams	Position	AFC President's Cup
2003	A-Division	12	2nd	—
2004	A-Division	13	2nd	—
2005–06	A-Division	15	4th	—
2006–07	A-Division	14	1st	—
2007	No league held			Runners-up
2008	No league held			Semi-finals
2009	No league held			Group stage
2010	A-Division	12	1st	—
2011	A-Division	18	1st	Group stage
2011–12	National League	10	1st	Group stage
2012–13	A-Division	16	7th	Group stage
2013–14	A-Division	13	4th	—
2015	National League	9	7th	Competition disbanded
2018–19	A-Division	14	6th	Competition disbanded
2019–20	A-Division	14	5th	Competition disbanded
2021-22	A-Division	14	11th	Competition disbanded
2023	A-Division	14	3rd	

== Performance in domestic competitions ==
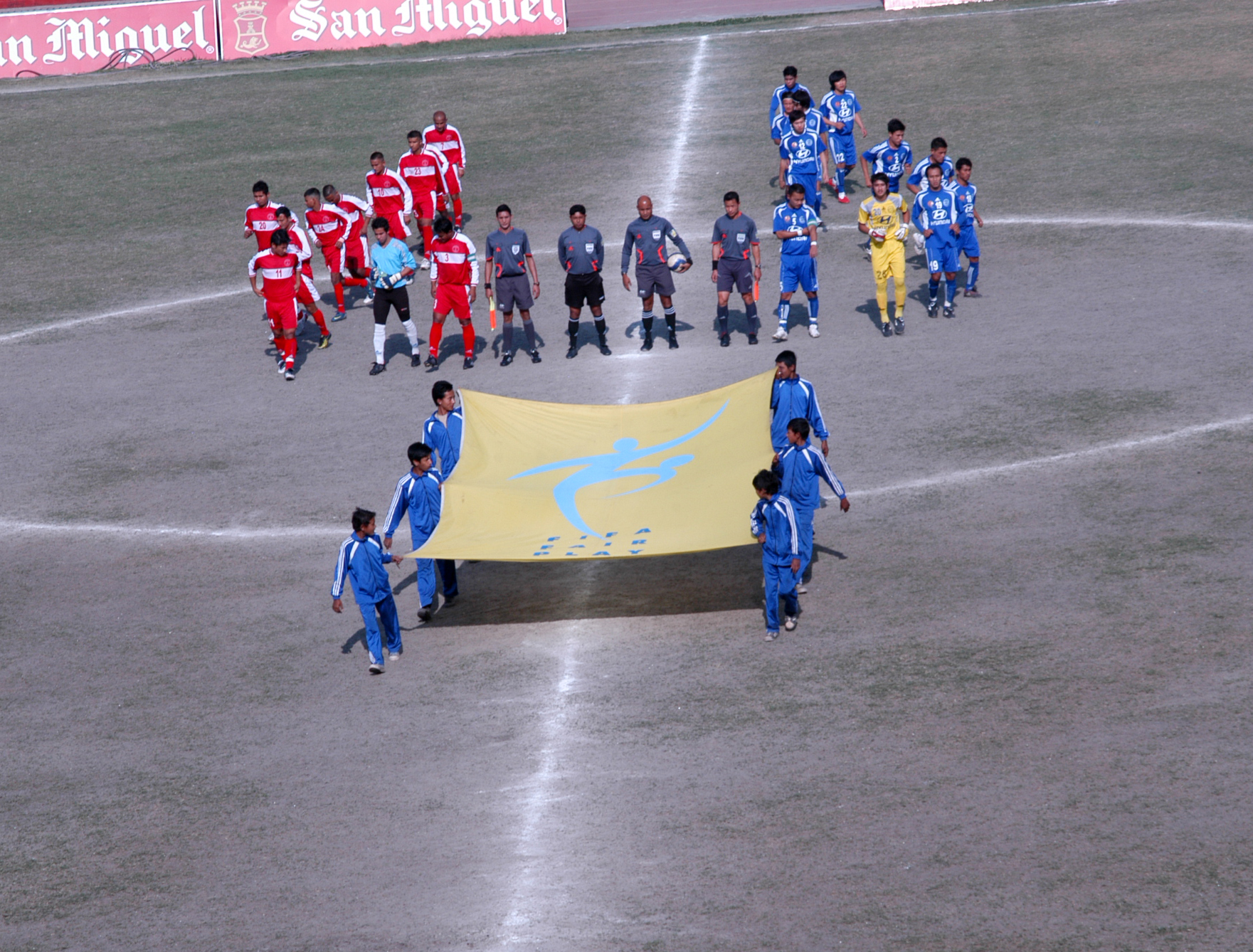
Players of Nepal Police Club (in red jersey) lining up for a match against Three Star Club

- Martyr's Memorial A-Division League: 4
  - Winner: 2006–07, 2010, 2011, 2011–12
  - Runners-up: 2004–05
- ANFA National League Cup: 2
  - Winner: 1998, 1999
- Tribhuvan Challenge Shield: 4
  - Winner: 1978, 1979, 1981, 1983
- Aaha Gold Cup: 5
  - Winner: 2002 (Caravan Gold Cup), 2003, 2008, 2009, 2010, 2018
- Budha Subba Gold Cup: 3
  - Winner: 2000, 2001, 2003
- Khukuri Gold Cup: 1
  - Winner: 2001
- सताक्षी Gold Cup: 1
  - Winner: 2016
- Birat Gold Cup: 2
  - Winner: 2004, 2016

== Performance in AFC competitions ==
=== Asian Club Championship ===
Season	Participated as	Position
1997–98	Mahendra Police Club	First Round

=== AFC President's Cup ===
Season	Participated as	Position
2007	Mahendra Police Club	Runner-up
2008	Nepal Police F.C.	Semi-Final
2009	Nepal Police F.C.	4th in Group Stage
2011	Nepal Police F.C.	4th in Group Stage

=== Asian Cup Winners Cup ===
Season	Participated as	Position
1998–99	Mahendra Police Club	First Round

== Under-18 ==
=== Performance record ===
Performance of Nepal Police FC U-18 in ANFA Youth Leagues
Year	Tournament	Final position
2024	U-18 ANFA Youth League	Champions

== Under-16 ==
=== Performance record ===
Performance of Nepal Police FC U-16 in ANFA Youth Leagues
Year	Tournament	Final position
2025	U-16 ANFA Youth League	7th

== See also ==
- APF F.C.
- Nepal Army F.C.
