= 2021 Lalitpur City F.C. season =

Lalitpur City
2021 season
- Owner: Bhat-Bhateni Super Market
- Chairman: Kamana Gurung
- Head coach: (Nepal) Pradip Humagain (until 2 May) (Nepal) Raju Tamang (interim, from 2 May)
- Stadium: Dasharath Rangasala
- Super League: 3rd of 7 (qualified for playoffs)
- Top goalscorer: League: (Nepal) Anjan Bista (3 goals); All: (Nepal) Anjan Bista (3 goals)
| Home colours | Away colours |

The 2021 season is Lalitpur City's 1st Nepal Super League season.

== Season overview ==
On 15 March, Lalitpur City announced the signing of Nepal national football team striker Anjan Bista as its marquee player.

On the auction of Nepal Super League, Lalitpur City acquired various players such as midfielder Arik Bista, Kamal Shrestha, Prabesh Danawar, etc.

On 11 April, Lalitpur City signed contract with Vilim Posinković.

On 16 April, Lalitpur City signed contract with Nurlan Novruzov.

== Competition ==
=== Nepal Super League ===
==== Results ====
| 24 April 2021 1 | Kathmandu Rayzrs FC | 1–0 | Lalitpur City FC | Kathmandu |
| 17:30 NST | Olaoumu 66' | Report | | Stadium: Dasharath Rangasala Stadium |

| 26 April 2021 4 | Lalitpur City FC | 1–1 | FC Chitwan | Kathmandu |
| 17:30 NST | K. Shrestha 49' | Report | A. Tamang 91' (o.g.) | Stadium: Dasharath Rangasala Stadium |

| 29 April 2021 8 | Lalitpur City FC | 1–1 | Dhangadhi FC | Kathmandu |
| 17:30 NST | R. Bista 78' | Report | Afeez Oladipo 72' | Stadium: Dasharath Rangasala Stadium |

| 2 May 2021 12 | Pokhara Thunders | 0–0 | Lalitpur City FC | Kathmandu |
| 17:30 NST | | Report | | Stadium: Dasharath Rangasala Stadium |

| 6 May 2021 16 | Lalitpur City FC | 1–0 | Butwal Lumbini FC | Kathmandu |
| 14:30 NST | N. Novruzov 5' | Report | | Stadium: Dasharath Rangasala Stadium |

| 8 May 2021 19 | Biratnagar City FC | 0–4 | Lalitpur City FC | Kathmandu |
| 14:30 NST | | Report | A. Bista 36', 81'; B.Rana 64'; N. Novruzov 90+6' | Stadium: Dasharath Rangasala Stadium |

==== League table ====
| Pos | Team | Pld | W | D | L | GF | GA | GD | Pts | Qualification |
|---|---|---|---|---|---|---|---|---|---|---|
| 1 | Kathmandu Rayzrs (C) | 6 | 4 | 1 | 1 | 9 | 8 | +1 | 13 | Advance to Playoffs |
| 2 | Dhangadhi | 6 | 3 | 1 | 2 | 8 | 5 | +3 | 10 | Advance to Playoffs |
| 3 | Lalitpur City | 6 | 2 | 3 | 1 | 7 | 3 | +4 | 9 | Advance to Playoffs |
| 4 | Butwal Lumbini | 6 | 2 | 2 | 2 | 7 | 6 | +1 | 8 | Advance to Playoffs |
| 5 | Pokhara Thunders | 6 | 2 | 2 | 2 | 3 | 4 | −1 | 8 | |

Source: Goal Nepal
Rules for classification: 1) points; 2) head-to-head points; 3) head-to-head goal difference; 4) goal difference; 5) number of goals scored; 6) play-off match
(C) Champions

=== Bracket ===
Preliminary
1 | Kathmandu Rayzrs | 1
2 | Dhangadhi (a.e.t.) | 2
3 | Lalitpur City | 1
4 | Butwal Lumbini | 0

Preliminary
Q1L | Kathmandu Rayzrs | 3
EW | Lalitpur City | 0

Final
Q1W | Dhangadhi | 0
Q2W | Kathmandu Rayzers | 1

=== Preliminary ===
| 12 May 2021 Eliminator | Lalitpur City FC | 1–0 | Butwal Lumbini F.C. | Kathmandu |
| 17:30 NST | Vilim Posinkovic (yellow card) 23'; Kamal Shrestha (yellow card) 31'; Anjan Bista (yellow card) 50', (goal) 61'; Ranjan Bista (yellow card) 90+2' | | William Opoku Asiedu (yellow card) 24'; Abhishek Rijal (yellow card) 40'; Sesehang Angdembe Limbu (yellow card) 56'; Man Bahadur Pariyar (yellow card) 68'; Jaya Gurung (yellow card) 74' | Stadium: Dasharath Rangasala; Referee: Prajwol Chhetri; Man of the Match: Arpan Karki (Lalitpur City FC) |

| 13 May 2021 Qualifier 2 | Kathmandu Rayzrs FC | 3–0 | Lalitpur City FC | Kathmandu |
| 17:30 NST | M. Olaoumu 14' (pen.), 22'; Stephen Binong 60'; Bishwash Shrestha (yellow card) 65'; Bikesh Kuthu (yellow card) 77' | | Gaurab Budathoki (yellow card) 56' | Stadium: Dasharath Rangasala; Referee: Prajwol Chhetri; Man of the Match: M. Olaoumu (Kathmandu Rayzrs FC) |

== Statistics ==
As of 18 May 2021

| No. | Player | Pos. | Nepal Super League | | | |
| No. | Player | Pos. | Apps | Goal | Booked | Sent off (straight red) |
|---|---|---|---|---|---|---|
| 1 | (Nepal) Rohit Karki | GK | 0(1) | | | |
| 2 | (Nepal) Palsang Lama | DF | 3(2) | | | |
| 3 | (Nepal) Saroj Yongan | DF | 1(1) | | 1 | |
| 4 | (Nepal) Niraj Basnet | DF | 7 | | 3 | |
| 7 | (Azerbaijan) Nurlan Novruzov | FW | 8 | 2 | 1 | |
| 8 | (Nepal) Arik Bista | MF | 8 | | 1 | |
| 9 | (Nepal) Ranjan Bista | MF | 0(5) | 1 | 3 | |
| 10 | (Nepal) Bimal Rana | FW | 5(3) | 1 | 1 | |
| 11 | (Nepal) Nabin Lama | MF | 3(2) | | | |
| 12 | (Nepal) Pravesh Kunwar | DF | 7(1) | | 1 | |
| 13 | (Nepal) Kamal Shrestha | DF | 8 | 1 | 2 | |
| 14 | (Nepal) Anjan Bista | FW | 8 | 3 | 2 | |
| 15 | (Nepal) Gaurab Budhathoki | MF | 2(3) | | 1 | |
| 19 | (Nepal) Dinesh Rai | MF | | | | |
| 23 | (Nepal) Mikchhen Tamang | MF | 5 | | | |
| 24 | (Nigeria) Peter Segun | DF | 5 | | | |
| 44/91 | (Croatia) Vilim Posinković | FW | 6(1) | | 2 | |
| 47 | (Nepal) Arpan Karki | GK | 8 | | 1 | |
| 77 | (Nepal) Binod Gurung | MF | 1(4) | | | |
| 80 | (Nepal) Dona Thapa | MF | 2(3) | | | |

=== Goalscorers ===
Includes all competitive matches. The list is sorted alphabetically by surname when total goals are equal.

| Rank | No. | Pos. | Player | Nepal Super League |
|---|---|---|---|---|
| 1 | 14 | FW | (Nepal) Anjan Bista | 3 |
| 2 | 7 | FW | (Azerbaijan) Nurlan Novruzov | 2 |
| 3 | 10 | FW | (Nepal) Bimal Rana | 1 |
| 3 | 13 | DF | (Nepal) Kamal Shrestha | 1 |
| 3 | 9 | MF | (Nepal) Ranjan Bista | 1 |

== Awards ==
=== NSL Super Forward of the League ===
| Season | Player | Goals | Ref. |
|---|---|---|---|
| 2020–21 | (Nepal) Anjan Bista | 3 | |
