= 2022 Nepal Super League =

Second season of Nepal Super League

Nepal Super League
- Season: 2022
- Dates: 31 August–11 October

The 2022 Nepal Super League will be the second season of the Nepal Super League, the top flight franchise based club football league of Nepal. A total of ten franchises will participate in the tournament to be played at the Dasharath Rangasala from 8 April to 21 May 2022. Kathmandu Rayzrs won the inaugural season after beating Dhangadhi FC in the final on 15 May 2021. In addition to the seven founding members, three new franchises were added. Jhapa FC will represent Jhapa, Province No. 1, Sporting Ilam De Mechi FC the Ilam, Province No. 1 and Birgunj United FC the Birgunj, Province No. 2.

== Teams ==
Team	Location
Kathmandu Rayzrs F.C.	Kathmandu, Bagmati Province
Lalitpur City F.C.	Lalitpur, Bagmati Province
F.C. Chitwan	Bharatpur, Bagmati Province
Pokhara Thunders	Pokhara, Gandaki Province
Butwal Lumbini F.C.	Butwal, Lumbini Province
Dhangadhi F.C.	Dhangadhi, Sudurpashchim Province
Jhapa FC	Jhapa, Province No. 1
Sporting Ilam De Mechi FC	Ilam, Province No. 1
Birgunj United FC	Birgunj, Madhesh Province

=== Personnel and sponsorship ===
Team	Head Coach	Captain	Marquee Player	Kit manufacturer	Shirt sponsor
Kathmandu Rayzrs FC			(Nepal) Hishub Thapaliya		
Lalitpur City FC	(Scotland) Ian Andrew Gillian		(Nepal) Ananta Tamang		
FC Chitwan	(India) Khalid Jamil		(Nepal) Bishal Shrestha		
Pokhara Thunders	(Nepal) Nabin Neaupane		(Nepal) Ayush Ghalan		
Butwal Lumbini F.C.	(Nepal) Bijay Maharjan		(Nepal) Arik Bista		
Dhangadhi FC	(Nepal) Yugal Kishor Rai		(Nepal) Ashish Chaudhary		
Sporting Ilam De Mechi FC	(Nepal) Meghraj KC		(Nepal) Bikesh Kuthu		
Jhapa FC			(Nepal) Anjan Bista		
Birgunj United FC	(Nepal) Sanoj Shrestha		(Nepal) Deep Karki		
