= 2023–24 Nepal Super League =

Second season of Nepal Super League

Nepal Super League
- Season: 2023
- Dates: 24 November – 30 December
- Champions: Lalitpur City FC
- Runner up: Dhangadhi FC
- Matches: 40
- Goals: 80 (2 per match)
- Best Player: (Nepal) Ananta Tamang
- Top goalscorer: (Nigeria) Imoh Ezekiel (6 goals)
- Best goalkeeper: (France) Jeffery Baltus
- Biggest win: Birgunj 4–1 Kathmandu (21 December)
- Highest scoring: Birgunj 4–1 Kathmandu
- Longest winning run: Lalitpur City FC (3 wins)
- Longest unbeaten run: 3 teams (6 matches)
- Longest winless run: Sporting Ilam De Mechi FC (5 matches)
- Longest losing run: 5 teams (2 matches)
- Highest attendance: 15,000
- Lowest attendance: 300

The 2023 Nepal Super League was the second season of the Nepal Super League, the top flight franchise based club football league of Nepal. A total of nine franchises participated in the tournament played at the Dasharath Rangasala from 24 November to 30 December 2023. Kathmandu Rayzrs had won the inaugural season after beating Dhangadhi FC in the final on 15 May 2021. In addition to the seven founding members, three new franchises were added. Jhapa FC represented Jhapa, Sporting Ilam De Mechi FC Ilam, and Birgunj United FC Birgunj. One of the founding members, Biratnagar City, decided to withdraw from the tournament, resulting in only nine teams participating in this edition. Lalitpur City FC became the champions of the second edition of the Nepal Super League. The losing finalists once again were Dhangadhi FC.

== Teams ==
Locations of the NSL clubs

| Team | Location |
|---|---|
| Kathmandu Rayzrs F.C. | Kathmandu, Bagmati Province |
| Lalitpur City F.C. | Lalitpur, Bagmati Province |
| F.C. Chitwan | Bharatpur, Bagmati Province |
| Pokhara Thunders | Pokhara, Gandaki Province |
| Butwal Lumbini F.C. | Butwal, Lumbini Province |
| Dhangadhi F.C. | Dhangadhi, Sudurpashchim Province |
| Jhapa FC | Jhapa, Koshi Province |
| Sporting Ilam De Mechi FC | Ilam, Koshi Province |
| Birgunj United FC | Birgunj, Madhesh Province |

=== Personnel and sponsorship ===
| Team | Head Coach | Captain | Marquee Player | Iconic Player | Kit manufacturer | Shirt sponsor |
|---|---|---|---|---|---|---|
| Kathmandu Rayzrs FC | (Nepal) Bal Gopal Maharjan | (Nepal) Hishub Thapaliya | (Nepal) Hishub Thapaliya | | Li-Ning | Yamaha RayZR 125FI Hybrid |
| Lalitpur City FC | (Australia) Ian Andrew Gillian | (Nepal) Ananta Tamang | (Nepal) Ananta Tamang | | T10 Sports | Prabhu Bank |
| FC Chitwan | (India) Mehrajuddin Wadoo | (Nepal) Bishal Shrestha | (Nepal) Bishal Shrestha | (Nepal) Bimal Gharti Magar | SIX5SIX | IME |
| Pokhara Thunders | (Nepal) Nabin Neaupane | (Nepal) Dinesh Rajbanshi | (Nepal) Ayush Ghalan | (Nepal) Dinesh Rajbanshi | Kelme | Shikhar Insurance |
| Butwal Lumbini F.C. | (Nepal) Bijay Maharjan | (Nepal) Arik Bista | (Nepal) Arik Bista | (Nepal) Aashish Lama | MODE23 | CURRENT |
| Dhangadhi FC | (Nepal) Yugal Kishor Rai | (Nepal) Devendra Tamang | (Nepal) Ashish Chaudhary | | T10 Sports | Higer |
| Sporting Ilam De Mechi FC | (Nepal) Meghraj KC | (Nepal) Bikesh Kuthu | (Nepal) Bikesh Kuthu | | SIX5SIX | Premier Intl. School |
| Jhapa FC | (Spain) Oriol Mohedano | (Nepal) Anjan Bista | (Nepal) Anjan Bista | (Nepal) Awas Lamichhane | Nivia Sports | Sahara Nepal |
| Birgunj United FC | (Nepal) Sanoj Shrestha | (Nepal) Deep Karki | (Nepal) Deep Karki | (Nepal) Tej Tamang | Li-Ning | WINgel |

== Foreign players ==
One team can recruit six overseas players and field five at a time.

| Team | Player 1 | Player 2 | Player 3 | Player 4 | Player 5 | Player 6 |
|---|---|---|---|---|---|---|
| Kathmandu Rayzrs FC | (Cameroon) Olivier Kingue | (Uzbekistan) Komilzhon Tozhidinov | (Cameroon) Andrés Nia | (Uzbekistan) Shokhrukh Makhmudkhozhiev | (Cameroon) Junior Nkengue | |
| Lalitpur City FC | (Nigeria) Kareem Omolaja | (France) Papa Ibou Kébé | (Martinique) Jeffrey Baltus | (Nigeria) Imoh Ezekiel | (Azerbaijan) Nurlan Novruzov | (India) Nikhil Kadam |
| FC Chitwan | (Ghana) Rafiq Aminu | (Ghana) Torric Jebrin | (Montenegro) Marko Ivanovic | (Ghana) Afriyie Acquah | (Ghana) Yussif Mubarik | |
| Pokhara Thunders | (Cameroon) Yves Priso | (Cameroon) Franklin Kuete | (Ghana) Joe Aidoo | (Ghana) Moses Gyabaah | (Cameroon) Stephan Kojo | |
| Butwal Lumbini F.C. | (Ivory Coast) Koussi Christian | (Cameroon) Stéphane Binong | (Cameroon) Nicolas Serge Song | (Cameroon) Andre Thierry Biyik Biyik | (Cameroon) Ernest Tampi | |
| Dhangadhi FC | (Nigeria) Olawale Afeez | (Senegal) Fallou Diagne | (Guinea) Fode Fofana | (Lebanon) Mohamad Taha | (Ghana) Richard Osei Agyemang | (Lebanon) Ahmad Hijazi |
| Jhapa FC | (Serbia) Stefan Čupić | (Uzbekistan) Samandar Ochilov | (United States) Dhiraj Thajali | (Spain) Nando Cózar | (Spain) Jorge Canillas | |
| Sporting Ilam De Mechi FC | (Senegal) Ibrahima Djite | (Senegal) Abdoulaye Ba | (Guinea) Fodé Camara | (Senegal) Badou Ndiaye | (Senegal) Amath Ndaw | |
| Birgunj United FC | (Ghana) William Opoku | (Ghana) Obed Yeboah | (Ghana) Hans Kwofie | (Ghana) Aikins Kyei Baffour | (Democratic Republic of the Congo) Tshamala Djadje | |

== Regular season ==
=== League table ===
| Pos | Team | Pld | W | D | L | GF | GA | GD | Pts | Qualification |
|---|---|---|---|---|---|---|---|---|---|---|
| 1 | Pokhara Thunders | 8 | 4 | 3 | 1 | 8 | 5 | +3 | 15 | Advance to Playoffs |
| 2 | Dhangadhi F.C. | 8 | 3 | 4 | 1 | 8 | 7 | +1 | 13 | Advance to Playoffs |
| 3 | Kathmandu Rayzrs F.C. | 8 | 3 | 3 | 2 | 8 | 9 | −1 | 12 | Advance to Playoffs |
| 4 | Lalitpur City F.C. | 8 | 2 | 4 | 2 | 7 | 5 | +2 | 10 | Advance to Playoffs |
| 5 | Jhapa FC | 8 | 2 | 4 | 2 | 4 | 4 | 0 | 10 | |
| 6 | Butwal Lumbini FC | 8 | 3 | 1 | 4 | 6 | 8 | −2 | 10 | |
| 7 | F.C. Chitwan | 8 | 2 | 3 | 3 | 7 | 8 | −1 | 9 | |
| 8 | Birgunj United FC | 8 | 2 | 2 | 4 | 11 | 11 | 0 | 8 | |
| 9 | Sporting Ilam De Mechi FC | 8 | 2 | 2 | 4 | 6 | 8 | −2 | 8 | |

Source: Hamrokhelkud
Rules for classification: 1) points; 2) head-to-head goal difference; 3) head-to-head points; 4) goal difference; 5) number of goals scored; 6) play-off match

== Results by games ==
| Team ╲ Round | 1 | 2 | 3 | 4 | 5 | 6 | 7 | 8 |
|---|---|---|---|---|---|---|---|---|
| Birgunj United FC | L | L | D | D | W | L | W | L |
| Butwal Lumbini FC | L | L | W | D | W | L | L | W |
| FC Chitwan | L | D | W | D | L | L | D | W |
| Dhangadhi FC | W | W | D | D | W | D | L | D |
| Sporting Ilam De Mechi FC | L | W | L | L | D | L | D | W |
| Jhapa FC | L | D | D | D | W | D | W | L |
| Kathmandu Rayzrs FC | W | D | D | L | W | D | L | W |
| Lalitpur City FC | W | D | D | D | W | D | L | L |
| Pokhara Thunders | W | D | D | W | L | W | W | D |

Source: ANFA
W = Win; D = Draw; L = Lose

== Head-to-head scores ==
| Home \ Away | BUFC | BLFC | DFC | FCC | KRFC | LCFC | PTFC | JFC | SIDM |
|---|---|---|---|---|---|---|---|---|---|
| Birgunj United | — | 0–1 | 1–2 | 1–2 | 4–1 | 2–2 | 1–2 | 0–0 | 2–1 |
| Butwal Lumbini | 1–0 | — | 0–1 | 1–1 | 2–1 | 0–2 | 0–1 | 0–1 | 2–1 |
| Dhangadhi | 2–1 | 1–0 | — | 1–0 | 1–1 | 0–0 | 1–1 | 0–2 | 2–2 |
| Chitwan | 2–1 | 1–1 | 0–1 | — | 1–1 | 1–3 | 0–1 | 2–0 | 0–0 |
| Kathmandu Rayzrs | 1–4 | 1–2 | 1–1 | 1–1 | — | 1–0 | 2–1 | 0–0 | 1–0 |
| Lalitpur City | 2–2 | 2–0 | 0–0 | 3–1 | 0–1 | — | 0–0 | 0–0 | 0–1 |
| Pokhara Thunders | 2–1 | 1–0 | 1–1 | 1–0 | 1–2 | 0–0 | — | 1–1 | 1–0 |
| Jhapa FC | 0–0 | 1–0 | 2–0 | 0–2 | 0–0 | 0–0 | 1–1 | — | 0–1 |
| Ilam De Mechi | 1–2 | 1–2 | 2–2 | 0–0 | 0–1 | 1–0 | 0–1 | 1–0 | — |

Source: HamroKhelkud
Legend: Blue = home team win; Yellow = draw; Red = away team win.

== Playoffs ==
=== Bracket ===
Preliminary
Dhangadhi FC | 2 (4)
Pokhara Thunders | 2 (3)
Lalitpur City FC | 3
Kathmandu Rayzrs FC | 0

Preliminary
Q1L | Pokhara Thunders | 1
EW | Lalitpur City FC | 2

Final
Q1W | Dhangadhi FC | 2
Q2W | Lalitpur City FC | 3

=== Preliminary ===
| 25 December 2023 Qualifier 1 | Dhangadhi FC | 2 (4) – 2 (3) (a.e.t.) | Pokhara Thunders | Kathmandu |
| 17:30 NST | Devendra Tamang 53'; Ahmad Hijazi 120' | | Ayush Ghalan 5'; Stephan Kojo 103' | Stadium: Dasharath Rangasala; Referee: Surojit Das; Man of the Match: Mohamad Taha (Dhangadhi FC) |

| 26 December 2023 Eliminator | Lalitpur City FC | 3 – 0 | Kathmandu Rayzrs FC | Kathmandu |
| 17:30 NST | Imoh Ezekiel 36', 52'; Papa Ibou Kébé 44' | | | Stadium: Dasharath Rangasala; Referee: Ram Dasan; Man of the Match: Imoh Ezekiel (Lalitpur City FC) |

| 28 December 2023 Qualifier 2 | Pokhara Thunders | 1 – 2 (a.e.t.) | Lalitpur City FC | Kathmandu |
| 17:30 NST | Stephan Kojo 71' | | Imoh Ezekiel 36'; Kushal Deuba 98' | Stadium: Dasharath Rangasala; Referee: Nabindra Maharjan; Man of the Match: Ananta Tamang (Lalitpur City FC) |

== Final ==
| 30 December 2023 Final | Dhangadhi FC | 2 – 3 | Lalitpur City FC | Kathmandu |
| 17:30 NST | Olawale Afeez 37'; Ahmad Hijazi 90+8' | | Imoh Ezekiel 45+6', 57'; Dinesh Henjan 49' | Stadium: Dasharath Rangasala; Attendance: 15,000; Referee: Ram Dasan; Man of the Match: Aditya Shakya (Lalitpur City FC) |

== Season statistics ==
=== Scorers ===
There have been 80 goals scored in 40 matches, for an average of 2 goals per match (as of 30 December 2023).

| Rank | Player | Club | Goals |
|---|---|---|---|
| 1 | (Nigeria) Imoh Ezekiel | Lalitpur City FC | 6 |
| 2 | (Ghana) William Opoku | Birgunj United FC | 5 |
| 2 | (Ghana) Moses Gyabaah Twum | Pokhara Thunders | 5 |
| 3 | (Nigeria) Olawale Afeez | Dhangadhi FC | 4 |
| 3 | (Lebanon) Ahmad Hijazi | Dhangadhi FC | 4 |
| 4 | (Cameroon) Stephane Binong Samir | Butwal Lumbini FC | 3 |
| 4 | (Cameroon) Junior Nkengue | Kathmandu Rayzrs FC | 3 |
| 4 | (Ghana) Rafiq Aminu | FC Chitwan | 3 |
| 4 | (France) Papa Ibou Kébé | Lalitpur City FC | 3 |
| 5 | (Ghana) Aikins Kyei Baffour | Birgunj United FC | 2 |
| 5 | (Nepal) Rajiv Lopchan | Kathmandu Rayzrs FC | 2 |
| 5 | (Nepal) Arik Bista | Butwal Lumbini FC | 2 |
| 5 | (Guinea) Fodé Camara | Sporting Ilam De Mechi FC | 2 |
| 5 | (Nepal) Ayush Ghalan | Pokhara Thunders | 2 |
| 5 | (Ghana) Stephan Kojo Papa | Pokhara Thunders | 2 |
| 5 | (Nepal) Dinesh Henjan | Lalitpur City FC | 2 |
| 6 | (Uzbekistan) Samandar Ochilov | Jhapa FC | 1 |
| 6 | (Nepal) Ananta Tamang | Lalitpur City FC | 1 |
| 6 | (Guinea) Fode Fofana | Dhangadhi FC | 1 |
| 6 | (Ghana) Hans Kwofie | Birgunj United FC | 1 |
| 6 | (Senegal) Amath Ndaw | Sporting Ilam De Mechi FC | 1 |
| 6 | (Uzbekistan) Shokhrukh Makhmudkhozhiev | Kathmandu Rayzrs FC | 1 |
| 6 | (Ghana) Torric Jebrin | FC Chitwan | 1 |
| 6 | (Nepal) Bimal Gharti Magar | FC Chitwan | 1 |
| 6 | (Senegal) Abdoulaye Ba | Sporting Ilam De Mechi FC | 1 |
| 6 | (Nepal) Utsab Rai | FC Chitwan | 1 |
| 6 | (India) Nikhil Kadam | Lalitpur City FC | 1 |
| 6 | (Nepal) Kripa Kanta Tharu | Birgunj United FC | 1 |
| 6 | (Nepal) Sanjeeb Bista | Pokhara Thunders | 1 |
| 6 | (Ghana) Richard Osei Agyemang | Dhangadhi FC | 1 |
| 6 | (Senegal) Omar Thiom | Sporting Ilam De Mechi FC | 1 |
| 6 | (Nepal) Bibek Poudel | Lalitpur City FC | 1 |
| 6 | (Spain) Jorge Canillas | Jhapa FC | 1 |
| 6 | (Nepal) Bhison Gurung | Birgunj United FC | 1 |
| 6 | (Nepal) Ashish Chapagain | Sporting Ilam De Mechi FC | 1 |
| 6 | (Ghana) Joe Aidoo | Pokhara Thunders | 1 |
| 6 | (Cameroon) Olivier Kingue | Kathmandu Rayzrs FC | 1 |
| 6 | (Nepal) Anjan Bista | Jhapa FC | 1 |
| 6 | (Nepal) Samiraj Thokar | Jhapa FC | 1 |
| 6 | (Nepal) Sunil Khadka | Birgunj United FC | 1 |
| 6 | (Nepal) Milan Rai | Dhangadhi FC | 1 |
| 6 | (Nepal) Chandan Das | Butwal Lumbini FC | 1 |
| 6 | (Cameroon) Andres Nia | Kathmandu Rayzrs FC | 1 |
| 6 | (Nepal) Devendra Tamang | Dhangadhi FC | 1 |
| 6 | (Nepal) Kushal Deuba | Lalitpur City FC | 1 |

=== Hat-tricks ===
| Player | For | Against | Result | Date |
|---|---|---|---|---|
| (Ghana) William Opoku | Birgunj United FC | Kathmandu Rayzrs FC | 4-1 | 21 December 2023 |

=== Clean sheets ===
| Rank | Player | Club | Clean sheets |
|---|---|---|---|
| 1 | (Serbia) Stefan Čupić | Jhapa FC | 5 |
| 1 | (France) Jeffrey Baltus | Lalitpur City FC | 5 |
| 2 | (Cameroon) Yves Priso Nganja | Pokhara Thunders | 4 |
| 3 | (Lebanon) Mohamad Taha | Dhangadhi FC | 2 |
| 3 | (Nepal) Bishal Shrestha | FC Chitwan | 2 |
| 3 | (Nepal) Abishek Baral | Kathmandu Rayzrs FC | 2 |
| 3 | (Nepal) Bikesh Kuthu | Sporting Ilam De Mechi FC | 2 |
| 4 | (Nepal) Deep Karki | Birgunj United FC | 1 |
| 4 | (Nepal) Tikendra Thapa | Dhangadhi FC | 1 |
| 4 | (Nepal) Samit Shrestha | Sporting Ilam De Mechi FC | 1 |
| 4 | (Cameroon) Moussi Mohamodou | Butwal Lumbini FC | 1 |
| 4 | (Nepal) Anjal Shrestha | Kathmandu Rayzrs FC | 1 |

== Attendances ==
| # | Football club | Average attendance |
|---|---|---|
| 1 | Dhangadhi FC | 4,803 |
| 2 | Kathmandu RayZRs | 3,536 |
| 3 | Lalitpur City | 3,126 |
| 4 | Pokhara Thunders | 2,502 |
| 5 | Jhapa FC | 2,403 |
| 6 | FC Chitwan | 2,151 |
| 7 | Birgunj United | 2,052 |
| 8 | Butwal Lumbini | 1,753 |
| 9 | Sporting Ilam | 1,501 |
