= 2021 Kathmandu Rayzrs F.C. season =

Kathmandu Rayzrs
2021 season
- Owner: MAW Group-Yamaha
- Chairman: Vishnu Agarwal
- Manager: Bal Gopal Maharjan
- Stadium: Dasharath Rangasala
- Super League: Champions
- Top goalscorer: Messouke Oloumou (8 goals)
Home colours	Away colours

The Kathmandu Rayzrs 2021 season is Kathmandu Rayzrs's 1st Nepal Super League season.

== Season overview ==
On 18 March, Kathmandu Rayzrs F.C. announced the signing of Nepal national football team Goalkeeper Bikesh Kuthu as its marquee player.

On the Nepal Super League (NSL) auction, Kathmandu Rayzrs FC bought several players such as midfielder Tej Tamang, Bishwash Shrestha, etc.

On 23 April, Kathmandu Rayzrs signed contracts with Messouke Oloumou, Stephane Samir and Florent Koara.

== Competitions ==
=== Nepal Super League ===
==== Results ====
24 April 2021 1	Kathmandu Rayzrs FC	1–0	Lalitpur City FC	Kathmandu
17:30 NST	Olaoumu 66'	Report		Stadium: Dasharath Rangasala Stadium

27 April 2021 5	Dhangadhi FC	3–0	Kathmandu Rayzrs FC	Kathmandu
17:30 NST	T. Basnet 19'; Afeez Oladipo 23', 45+5'; R. Dangal (yellow card) 62' (yellow-red card) 68'	Report		Stadium: Dasharath Rangasala Stadium

30 April 2021 9	Kathmandu Rayzrs FC	0–0	Pokhara Thunders	Kathmandu
17:30 NST		Report		Stadium: Dasharath Rangasala Stadium

4 May 2021 14	Butwal Lumbini FC	0-1	Kathmandu Rayzrs FC	Kathmandu
17:30 NST		Report	S. Sameer 5'	Stadium: Dasharath Rangasala Stadium

6 May 2021 17	Kathmandu Rayzrs FC	5–4	Biratnagar City FC	Kathmandu
17:30 NST	Olaoumu 35', 36', 68'; S. Sameer 41'; T. Gurung 82'	Report	Oluwawunmi 5'; P. Manzi 33', 90+4'; R. Dhimal 79'	Stadium: Dasharath Rangasala; Man of the Match: Olaoumu (Kathmandu Rayzrs FC)

9 May 2021 21	FC Chitwan	1–2	Kathmandu Rayzrs FC	Kathmandu
17:30 NST	R. Lopchan 40'	Report	M. Olaoumu 19'; S. Rai 34'	Stadium: Dasharath Rangasala; Man of the Match: Tej Tamang (Kathmandu Rayzrs FC)

==== League table ====
Pos	Team	Pld	W	D	L	GF	GA	GD	Pts	Qualification
1	Kathmandu Rayzrs (C)	6	4	1	1	9	8	+1	13	Advance to Playoffs
2	Dhangadhi	6	3	1	2	8	5	+3	10	Advance to Playoffs
3	Lalitpur City	6	2	3	1	7	3	+4	9	Advance to Playoffs
4	Butwal Lumbini	6	2	2	2	7	6	+1	8	Advance to Playoffs

Source: Goal Nepal
Rules for classification: 1) points; 2) head-to-head points; 3) head-to-head goal difference; 4) goal difference; 5) number of goals scored; 6) play-off match
(C) Champions

=== Bracket ===
Preliminary
1	Kathmandu Rayzrs	1
2	Dhangadhi (a.e.t.)	2
3	Lalitpur City	1
4	Butwal Lumbini	0

Preliminary
Q1L	Kathmandu Rayzrs	3
EW	Lalitpur City	0

Final
Q1W	Dhangadhi	0
Q2W	Kathmandu Rayzers	1

=== Preliminary ===
11 May 2021 Qualifier 1	Kathmandu Rayzrs FC	1–2 (a.e.t.)	Dhangadhi FC	Kathmandu
17:30 NST	Tej Tamang 75'		Afeez Olawale Oladipo (yellow card) 33'; Darshan Gurung (yellow card) 44'; Pujan Uparkoti 78'; Bishal Rai 108'	Stadium: Dasharath Rangasala

13 May 2021 Qualifier 2	Kathmandu Rayzrs FC	3–0	Lalitpur City FC	Kathmandu
17:30 NST	M. Olaoumu 14' (pen.), 22'; Stephen Binong 60'; Bishwash Shrestha (yellow card) 65'; Bikesh Kuthu (yellow card) 77'		Gaurab Budathoki (yellow card) 56'	Stadium: Dasharath Rangasala; Referee: Prajwol Chhetri; Man of the Match: M. Olaoumu (Kathmandu Rayzrs FC)

=== Final ===
15 May 2021 Final	Dhangadhi FC	0-1	Kathmandu Rayzrs FC	Kathmandu
17:30 NST	Bishal Rai (yellow card) 71'		M. Olaoumu 21'	Stadium: Dasharath Rangasala; Referee: Nabin Maharjan; Man of the Match: Florent Koara (Kathmandu Rayzrs FC)

== Statistics ==
As of 18 May 2021

No.	Player	Pos.	Nepal Super League			
No.	Player	Pos.	Apps	Goal	Booked	Sent off (straight red)
1	(Nepal) Bikesh Kuthu	GK	8		1	
3	(Nepal) Ashish Gurung	DF	8(1)		1	
4	(Nepal) Sudip Shikhrakar	DF	3(1)			
5	(Nepal) Tshring Gurung	MF	9	1		
6	(Nepal) Bishwas Udas	DF	4		1	
7	(Nepal) Rumesh Bartaula	MF	0(7)			
8	(Nepal) Ashish Rai	MF	5(3)			
9	(Nepal) Bishwash Shrestha	MF	8(1)		1	
10	(Nepal) Prezen Tamang	FW	2(6)		1	
11	(Nepal) Sanjok Rai	FW	6	1	1	
12	(Nepal) Anjan Rai	DF	0(7)			
13	(Nepal) Tej Tamang	MF	8	1		
14	(Nepal) Amrit Shrestha	DF	0(1)			
16	(Nepal) Rajan Gurung	DF	3(3)			
17	(Cameroon) Messouke E. Oloumou	MF	9	8	1	
19	(Cameroon) Stephane Samir	FW	8	3	2	
20	(Nepal) Binaya Shrestha	GK	1			
28	(Nepal) Sudil Rai	FW	7(1)			
30	(Nepal) Bimal Pandey	DF	0(1)			
33	(Ivory Coast) Florent Koara	DF	9		1	
	(Nepal) Prithivi Chaudhary	DF				
	(Nepal) Tridev Gurung	MF				
	(Nepal) Sanjog Maharjan	MF				

=== Goalscorers ===
Rank	No.	Pos.	Player	Nepal Super League Goals
1	17	MF	(Cameroon) Messouke E. Oloumou	8
2	19	FW	(Cameroon) Stephane Samir	3
3	5	MF	(Nepal) Tshring Gurung	1
3	11	FW	(Nepal) Sanjok Rai	1
3	13	MF	(Nepal) Tej Tamang	1

==== Hat-tricks ====
Player	For	Against	Result	Date
(Cameroon) M. Olaoumu	Kathmandu Rayzrs	Biratnagar City	5–4	6 May 2021

== Awards ==
=== NSL Super Midfielder of the League ===
Season	Player	Goals	Assists	Ref.
2020–21	(Cameroon) Messouke Oloumou	8		

=== NSL Nivia Emerging Player of the League ===
Season	Player	Ref.
2020–21	(Nepal) Bishwash Shrestha	

=== NSL Super Coach of the League ===
Season	Coach	Ref.
2020–21	(Nepal) Bal Gopal Maharjan	
