= 2021 Nepal Super League =

First season of NSL

Nepal Super League
- Season: 2021
- Dates: 24 April – 15 May 2021
- Champions: Kathmandu Rayzrs
- Runner up: Dhangadhi FC
- Matches: 25
- Goals: 58 (2.32 per match)
- Best Player: Goalkeeper: Kiran Chemjong (Dhangadhi FC); Defender: Dinesh Rajbanshi (Dhangadhi FC); Midfielder: Messouke Oloumou (Kathmandu Rayzrs); Forward: Anjan Bista (Lalitpur City)
- Top goalscorer: Messouke Oloumou(8 goals)
- Highest scoring: Kathmandu Rayzrs 5–4 Biratnagar City (6 May 2021)
- Longest winning run: 4 games Kathmandu Rayzrs
- Longest unbeaten run: 6 games Lalitpur City
- Longest winless run: 6 games FC Chitwan
- Longest losing run: 4 games FC Chitwan

The 2021 Nepal Super League was the first season of the Nepal Super League, the first professional franchise based club football league of Nepal. Seven franchises participated in the tournament played at the Dasharath Rangasala from 24 April to 15 May 2021. Kathmandu Rayzrs won the title after beating Dhangadhi FC in the final on 15 May 2021.

== Venue ==
All matches were played at the Dasarath Rangasala in Kathmandu.

Kathmandu	2021 Nepal Super League is located in Nepal
Dasarath Rangasala	2021 Nepal Super League is located in Nepal
Capacity: 15,000	2021 Nepal Super League is located in Nepal

== Teams ==
Locations of the NSL clubs

=== Personnel and sponsorship ===
Team	Head Coach	Captain	Marquee Player	Kit manufacturer	Shirt sponsor
Biratnagar City FC	(India) Yan Law	(Nepal) Ranjit Dhimal	(Nepal) Ranjit Dhimal	SIX5SIX	Janaki Water Tank
Kathmandu Rayzrs FC	(Nepal) Bal Gopal Maharjan	(Nepal) Bikesh Kuthu	(Nepal) Bikesh Kuthu	Adidas	Yamaha RayZR 125FI
Lalitpur City FC	(Nepal) Raju Tamang	(Nepal) Anjan Bista	(Nepal) Anjan Bista	Umbro	Chivas Regal
FC Chitwan	(Nepal) Meghraj K.C.	(Nepal) Bharat Khawas	(Nepal) Bharat Khawas	Li-Ning	IME Group
Pokhara Thunders	(Nepal) Nabin Neupane	(Nepal) Anil Gurung	(Nepal) Nawayug Shrestha	Attsh	Hyundai
Butwal Lumbini F.C.	(Nepal) Sanoj Shrestha	(Nepal) Bishal Shrestha	(Nepal) Bishal Shrestha	KTM CTY	eHub
Dhangadhi FC	(Nepal) Yugal Kishor Rai	(Nepal) Kiran Chemjong	(Nepal) Bishal Rai	T10 Sports	Kia Nepal

=== Personnel changes ===
Team	Outgoing coach	Manner of departure	Date of vacancy	Position in table	Incoming coach	Date of appointment
Lalitpur City FC	(United States) Pradip Humagain	Mutual consent	2 May 2021	6th	(Nepal) Raju Tamang (interim)	2 May 2021

== Foreign players ==
Each team can recruit three overseas players and field up to two in a match at a time.

Team	Player 1	Player 2	Player 3
Biratnagar City FC	(Spain) Pedro Manzi	(Nigeria) Oluwaunmi Somide	(Cameroon) Ulrich Siewe
Kathmandu Rayzrs FC	(Cameroon) Messouke Oloumou	(Cameroon) Stephane Samir	(Ivory Coast) Koara Larba Florent
Lalitpur City FC	(Croatia) Vilim Posinković	(Azerbaijan) Nurlan Novruzov	(Nigeria) Peter Segun
FC Chitwan	(Egypt) El Sayed Shaaban	(Cameroon) Ruddy Mbakop	(Egypt) Ahmed Bogy
Pokhara Thunders	(Cameroon) Moussa Abagana	(Cameroon) Ketcha Yannick	(Cameroon) Bidias Rim Raphael
Butwal Lumbini F.C.	(Ghana) William Opoku	(Chad) Armand Beadum	
Dhangadhi FC	(Nigeria) Afeez Oladipo	(Cameroon) Ernest Tampi	(Cameroon) Franklin Kuete Talla

== Regular season ==
=== League Table ===
Pos	Team	Pld	W	D	L	GF	GA	GD	Pts	Qualification
1	Kathmandu Rayzrs (C)	6	4	1	1	9	8	+1	13	Advance to Playoffs
2	Dhangadhi	6	3	1	2	8	5	+3	10	Advance to Playoffs
3	Lalitpur City	6	2	3	1	7	3	+4	9	Advance to Playoffs
4	Butwal Lumbini	6	2	2	2	7	6	+1	8	Advance to Playoffs
5	Pokhara Thunders	6	2	2	2	3	4	−1	8	
6	Biratnagar City	6	2	1	3	11	12	−1	7	
7	Chitwan	6	0	2	4	5	12	−7	2	

Source: Goal Nepal
Rules for classification: 1) points; 2) head-to-head points; 3) head-to-head goal difference; 4) goal difference; 5) number of goals scored; 6) play-off match
(C) Champions

== Results ==
Home \ Away	BCFC	BLFC	DFC	FCC	KRFC	LCFC	PTFC
Biratnagar City	—	—	3–0	—	—	0–4	0–1
Butwal Lumbini	2–2	—	1–0	—	0–1	—	—
Dhangadhi	—	—	—	3–0	3–0	—	1–0
Chitwan	0–2	2–2	—	—	1–2	—	—
Kathmandu Rayzrs	5–4	—	—	—	—	1–0	0–0
Lalitpur City	—	1–0	1–1	1–1	—	—	—
Pokhara Thunders	—	0–2	—	2–1	—	0–0	—

Updated to match(es) played on 9 May 2021. Source: Goal Nepal
Legend: Blue = home team win; Yellow = draw; Red = away team win.

== Round robin ==
24 April 2021 1	Kathmandu Rayzrs FC	1–0	Lalitpur City FC	Kathmandu
17:30 NST	Stéphane Binong (yellow card) 30' Koara Larba Florest (yellow card) 49': M. Olaoumu 66'	Report	Saroj Lama (yellow card) 18' Niroj Basnet (yellow card) 22' Ranjan Bista (yellow card) 81'	Stadium: Dasharath Rangasala; Man of the Match: Sanjog Rai (footballer) (Kathmandu Rayzrs FC)

25 April 2021 2	Biratnagar City FC	3–0	Dhangadhi FC	Kathmandu
14:30 NST	B. Dhimal 15'; Oluwawunmi 57'; S. Tamang 69'	Report		Stadium: Dasharath Rangasala; Man of the Match: S. Tamang (Biratnagar City FC)

25 April 2021 3	Pokhara Thunders	0–2	Butwal Lumbini F.C.	Kathmandu
17:30 NST		Report	Beadum 42'; A. Bhandari 77' (o.g.)	Stadium: Dasharath Rangasala; Man of the Match: Beadum (Butwal Lumbini F.C.)

26 April 2021 4	Lalitpur City FC	1–1	FC Chitwan	Kathmandu
17:30 NST	Bikash Khawas (yellow card) 42'; K. Shrestha 49'; Rup Bahadur Lama (yellow card) 80'	Report	Arpan Karki (yellow card) 60'; N. Novruzov (yellow card) 88'; A. Tamang 91' (o.g.)	Stadium: Dasharath Rangasala; Man of the Match: Bishal Sunar (FC Chitwan)

27 April 2021 5	Dhangadhi FC	3–0	Kathmandu Rayzrs FC	Kathmandu
17:30 NST	T. Basnet 19'; Afeez Oladipo 23', 45+5'; R. Dangal (yellow card) 62' (yellow-red card) 68'	Report		Stadium: Dasharath Rangasala; Man of the Match: Afeez Oladipo (Dhangadhi FC)

28 April 2021 6	FC Chitwan	2–2	Butwal Lumbini F.C.	Kathmandu
14:30 NST	G.P. Karki 15'; T. B. Budhathoki 19'	Report	A. Lama 32'; L. Ruchal 65'	Stadium: Dasharath Rangasala; Man of the Match: G.P. Karki (FC Chitwan)

28 April 2021 7	Biratnagar City FC	0–1	Pokhara Thunders	Kathmandu
17:30 NST		Report	N. Shrestha 83'	Stadium: Dasharath Rangasala; Man of the Match: N. Shrestha (Pokhara Thunders)

29 April 2021 8	Lalitpur City FC	1–1	Dhangadhi FC	Kathmandu
17:30 NST	B. Rana (yellow card) 4'; Prabesh Kunwar Danuwar (yellow card) 60'; Niroj Basnet (yellow card) 69'; R. Bista 78'	Report	Pujan Uparkoti (yellow card) 28'; Rupesh KC (yellow card) 36'; Kiran Chemjong (yellow card) 43'; Afeez Oladipo 72'	Stadium: Dasharath Rangasala; Man of the Match: Dinesh Rajbanshi (Dhangadhi FC)

30 April 2021 9	Kathmandu Rayzrs FC	0–0	Pokhara Thunders	Kathmandu
17:30 NST		Report		Stadium: Dasharath Rangasala; Man of the Match: Padam Moktan (Pokhara Thunders)

1 May 2021 10	Dhangadhi FC	3–0	FC Chitwan	Kathmandu
14:30 NST	N. Limbu 64'; Afeez Oladipo 69'; B. Tamang 80'	Report		Stadium: Dasharath Rangasala; Man of the Match: N. Limbu (Dhangadhi FC)

1 May 2021 11	Butwal Lumbini F.C.	2–2	Biratnagar City FC	Kathmandu
17:30 NST	K. Omolaja 6'; L. Ruchal 68'	Report	P. Manzi 42'; S. Tamang 90+2'	Stadium: Dasharath Rangasala; Man of the Match: P. Manzi (Biratnagar City FC)

2 May 2021 12	Pokhara Thunders	0–0	Lalitpur City FC	Kathmandu
17:30 NST	Ketcha Wannick (yellow card) 87'	Report		Stadium: Dasharath Rangasala; Man of the Match: Prabesh Kunwar Danuwar (Lalitpur City FC)

3 May 2021 13	FC Chitwan	0–2	Biratnagar City FC	Kathmandu
17:30 NST		Report	P. Manzi 73'; S. Tamang 89'	Stadium: Dasharath Rangasala; Man of the Match: Rajeen Dhimal (Biratnagar City FC)

4 May 2021 14	Butwal Lumbini F.C.	0–1	Kathmandu Rayzrs FC	Kathmandu
17:30 NST		Report	Stéphane Binong 5'	Stadium: Dasharath Rangasala; Man of the Match: Bikesh Kuthu (Kathmandu Rayzrs FC)

5 May 2021 15	Dhangadhi FC	1–0	Pokhara Thunders	Kathmandu
17:30 NST	D. Gurung 68'	Report		Stadium: Dasharath Rangasala; Man of the Match: Kiran Chemjong (Dhangadhi FC)

6 May 2021 16	Lalitpur City FC	1–0	Butwal Lumbini F.C.	Kathmandu
14:30 NST	N. Novruzov 5'; Vilim Posinkovic (yellow card) 23'; Kamal Shrestha (yellow card) 31'; Anjan Bista (yellow card) 50'; Ranjan Bista (yellow card) 90+2'	Report	William Opoku Asiedu (yellow card) 24'; Abhishek Rijal (yellow card) 40'; Sesehang Angdembe Limbu (yellow card) 43'; Man Bahadur Pariyar (yellow card) 68'; Jaya Gurung (yellow card) 74'	Stadium: Dasharath Rangasala; Man of the Match: Anjan Bista (Lalitpur City FC)

6 May 2021 17	Kathmandu Rayzrs FC	5–4	Biratnagar City FC	Kathmandu
17:30 NST	Olaoumu 35', 36', 68'; S. Sameer 41'; T. Gurung 82'	Report	Oluwawunmi 5'; P. Manzi 33', 90+4'; R. Dhimal 79'	Stadium: Dasharath Rangasala; Man of the Match: Olaoumu (Kathmandu Rayzrs FC)

7 May 2021 18	Pokhara Thunders	2–1	FC Chitwan	Kathmandu
17 :30 NST	N. Shrestha 86'; B. Raphael 90+5'	Report	S. Lekhi 72'	Stadium: Dasharath Rangasala; Man of the Match: Ravi Paswan (Pokhara Thunders)

8 May 2021 19	Biratnagar City FC	0–4	Lalitpur City FC	Kathmandu
14:30 NST	Suraj Jeu Thakuri (yellow card) 34'; Sunil Bal (yellow card) 48'; Bikram Dhimal (yellow card) 80'; Bijay Dhimal (yellow card) 84' (yellow-red card) 85'	Report	Niroj Basnet (yellow card) 34'; A. Bista 36', 81'; Arik Bista (yellow card) 52'; B. Rana 64'; N. Novruzov 90+6'	Stadium: Dasharath Rangasala; Man of the Match: Anjan Bista (Lalitpur City FC)

8 May 2021 20	Butwal Lumbini F.C.	1–0	Dhangadhi FC	Kathmandu
17:30 NST	S. Lama 80'	Report		Stadium: Dasharath Rangasala; Man of the Match: William Opoku (Butwal Lumbini F.C.)

9 May 2021 21	FC Chitwan	1–2	Kathmandu Rayzrs FC	Kathmandu
17:30 NST	R. Lopchan 40'	Report	M. Olaoumu 19'; S. Rai 34'	Stadium: Dasharath Rangasala; Man of the Match: Tej Tamang (Kathmandu Rayzrs FC)

== Playoffs ==
=== Bracket ===
Preliminary
1	Kathmandu Rayzrs	1
2	Dhangadhi (a.e.t.)	2
3	Lalitpur City	1
4	Butwal Lumbini	0

Preliminary
Q1L	Kathmandu Rayzrs	3
EW	Lalitpur City	0

Final
Q1W	Dhangadhi	0
Q2W	Kathmandu Rayzers	1

=== Preliminary ===
11 May 2021 Qualifier 1	Kathmandu Rayzrs FC	1–2 (a.e.t.)	Dhangadhi FC	Kathmandu
17:30 NST	Tej Tamang 75'		Afeez Olawale Oladipo (yellow card) 33'; Darshan Gurung (yellow card) 44'; Pujan Uparkoti 78'; Bishal Rai 108'	Stadium: Dasharath Rangasala

12 May 2021 Eliminator	Lalitpur City FC	1–0	Butwal Lumbini F.C.	Kathmandu
17:30 NST	Vilim Posinkovic (yellow card) 23'; Kamal Shrestha (yellow card) 31'; Anjan Bista (yellow card) 50', (goal) 61'; Ranjan Bista (yellow card) 90+2'		William Opoku Asiedu (yellow card) 24'; Abhishek Rijal (yellow card) 40'; Sesehang Angdembe Limbu (yellow card) 56'; Man Bahadur Pariyar (yellow card) 68'; Jaya Gurung (yellow card) 74'	Stadium: Dasharath Rangasala; Referee: Prajwol Chhetri; Man of the Match: Arpan Karki (Lalitpur City FC)

13 May 2021 Qualifier 2	Kathmandu Rayzrs FC	3–0	Lalitpur City FC	Kathmandu
17:30 NST	M. Olaoumu 14' (pen.), 22'; Stephen Binong 60'; Bishwash Shrestha (yellow card) 65'; Bikesh Kuthu (yellow card) 77'		Gaurab Budathoki (yellow card) 56'	Stadium: Dasharath Rangasala; Referee: Prajwol Chhetri; Man of the Match: M. Olaoumu (Kathmandu Rayzrs FC)

=== Final ===
15 May 2021 Final	Dhangadhi FC	0–1	Kathmandu Rayzrs FC	Kathmandu
17:30 NST	Bishal Rai (yellow card) 71'		M. Olaoumu 21'	Stadium: Dasharath Rangasala; Referee: Nabin Maharjan; Man of the Match: Florent Koara (Kathmandu Rayzrs FC)

== Season statistics ==
=== Scoring ===
==== Top scorers ====
There have been 58 goals scored in 25 matches, for an average of 2.32 goals per match (as of 15 May 2021).

Rank	Player	Club	Goals
1	(Cameroon) Messouke Oloumou	Kathmandu Rayzrs	8
2	(Spain) Pedro Manzi	Biratnagar City	4
2	(Nigeria) Afeez Oladipo	Dhangadhi	4
3	(Cameroon) Stéphane Binong	Kathmandu Rayzrs	3
3	(Nepal) Santosh Tamang	Biratnagar City	3
3	(Nepal) Anjan Bista	Lalitpur City	3
4	(Nigeria) Oluwaunmi Somide	Biratnagar City	2
4	(Nepal) Laxman Ruchal	Butwal Lumbini F.C.	2
4	(Nepal) Nawayug Shrestha	Pokhara Thunders	2
4	(Azerbaijan) Nurlan Novruzov	Lalitpur City	2

==== Hat-tricks ====
Player	For	Against	Result	Date
(Cameroon) Messouke Oloumou	Kathmandu Rayzrs	Biratnagar City	5–4	6 May 2021

=== Clean sheets ===
Rank	Player	Club	Clean sheets
1	(Nepal) Bikesh Kuthu	Kathmandu Rayzrs	5
2	(Nepal) Arpan Karki	Lalitpur City	4
3	(Nepal) Deep Karki	Pokhara Thunders	3
3	(Nepal) Kiran Chemjong	Dhangadhi	3
4	(Nepal) Kishor Giri	Biratnagar City	2
4	(Nepal) Bishal Shrestha	Butwal Lumbini F.C.	2

== Awards ==
=== End-of-season awards ===
Award	Winner	Club
Goalkeeper	(Nepal) Kiran Chemjong	Dhangadhi F.C.
Defender	(Nepal) Dinesh Rajbanshi	Dhangadhi F.C.
Midfielder	(Cameroon) Messouke Oloumou	Kathmandu Rayzrs
Forward	(Nepal) Anjan Bista	Lalitpur City
Head coach	(Nepal) Bal Gopal Maharjan	Kathmandu Rayzrs
Emerging Player	(Nepal) Biswash Shrestha	Kathmandu Rayzrs
Fair Play	Butwal Lumbini F.C.	
