= 2023 SAFF Championship squads =

Squads for football competition in India

The 2023 SAFF Championship was the 14th edition of the SAFF Championship, the international men's football championship of South Asia organized by South Asian Football Federation (SAFF). The tournament was held in Bengaluru, India from 21 June to 4 July 2023.

The age listed for each player is on 21 June 2023. The club listed is the club for which the player last played a competitive match prior to the tournament. A flag is included for coaches who are of a different nationality than their own national team.

The following squads were announced by the respective national federations. Each team was permitted to register a maximum of 23 players for the tournament.

== Group A ==
=== India ===
Coach: (Croatia) Igor Štimac

India named their squad for the tournament.

Note: Flags indicate national team as defined under FIFA eligibility rules; some limited exceptions apply. Players may hold more than one non-FIFA nationality.

| No. | Pos. | Nation | Player |
|---|---|---|---|
| 1 | GK | IND | Gurpreet Singh Sandhu |
| 2 | DF | IND | Subhasish Bose |
| 3 | DF | IND | Pritam Kotal |
| 4 | DF | IND | Sandesh Jhingan |
| 5 | DF | IND | Anwar Ali |
| 6 | MF | IND | Liston Colaco |
| 7 | MF | IND | Ashique Kuruniyan |
| 8 | MF | IND | Suresh Singh Wangjam |
| 9 | FW | IND | Sunil Chhetri (Captain) |
| 10 | MF | IND | Rohit Kumar |
| 11 | MF | IND | Udanta Singh |
| 12 | DF | IND | Akash Mishra |

| No. | Pos. | Nation | Player |
|---|---|---|---|
| 13 | GK | IND | Amrinder Singh |
| 14 | MF | IND | Anirudh Thapa |
| 15 | MF | IND | Naorem Mahesh Singh |
| 16 | MF | IND | Nikhil Poojary |
| 17 | MF | IND | Jeakson Singh |
| 18 | MF | IND | Sahal Abdul Samad |
| 19 | FW | IND | Rahim Ali |
| 20 | MF | IND | Lalengmawia Ralte |
| 21 | MF | IND | Lallianzuala Chhangte |
| 22 | MF | IND | Rowllin Borges |
| 23 | GK | IND | Gurmeet Singh |
| — | DF | IND | Mehtab Singh |
| — | DF | IND | Rahul Bheke |
| — | MF | IND | Nandha Kumar Sekar |

=== Kuwait ===
Coach: (Portugal) Rui Bento

Kuwait named their squad for the tournament.

Note: Flags indicate national team as defined under FIFA eligibility rules; some limited exceptions apply. Players may hold more than one non-FIFA nationality.

| No. | Pos. | Nation | Player |
|---|---|---|---|
| 1 | GK | KUW | Sulaiman Abdulghafour |
| 2 | DF | KUW | Hassan Al-Enezi |
| 3 | DF | KUW | Khalid El Ebrahim |
| 4 | DF | KUW | Abdullah Ammar |
| 5 | DF | KUW | Hamad Al-Qallaf |
| 6 | MF | KUW | Sultan Al-Enezi |
| 7 | MF | KUW | Hamad Al-Harbi |
| 8 | MF | KUW | Redha Hani |
| 9 | FW | KUW | Shabaib Al-Khaldi |
| 10 | MF | KUW | Fawaz Ayedh |
| 11 | MF | KUW | Ahmed Al-Dhefiri |
| 12 | DF | KUW | Mahdi Dashti |

| No. | Pos. | Nation | Player |
|---|---|---|---|
| 13 | GK | KUW | Bader Al-Saanoun |
| 14 | MF | KUW | Abdullah Ghanim |
| 15 | MF | KUW | Mobarak Al-Faneeni |
| 16 | MF | KUW | Athbi Saleh |
| 17 | MF | KUW | Mohammad Daham |
| 18 | MF | KUW | Eid Al-Rashidi |
| 19 | MF | KUW | Ali Khalaf |
| 23 | GK | KUW | Abdulrahman Kameel |

=== Nepal ===
Coach: (Italy) Vincenzo Alberto Annese

Nepal named their squad for the tournament.

Note: Flags indicate national team as defined under FIFA eligibility rules; some limited exceptions apply. Players may hold more than one non-FIFA nationality.

| No. | Pos. | Nation | Player |
|---|---|---|---|
| 1 | GK | NEP | Kiran Chemjong (Captain) |
| 2 | DF | NEP | Bimal Panday |
| 3 | DF | NEP | Sanish Shrestha |
| 4 | DF | NEP | Ananta Tamang |
| 5 | DF | NEP | Devendra Tamang |
| 6 | MF | NEP | Pujan Uperkoti |
| 7 | MF | NEP | Arik Bista |
| 8 | MF | NEP | Nabin Lama |
| 9 | FW | NEP | Ayush Ghalan |
| 10 | FW | NEP | Nawayug Shrestha |
| 11 | FW | NEP | Dipak Raj Singh Thakuri |
| 12 | DF | NEP | Nishant Khadka |

| No. | Pos. | Nation | Player |
|---|---|---|---|
| 13 | GK | NEP | Deep Karki |
| 14 | MF | NEP | Mani Kumar Lama |
| 15 | MF | NEP | Laken Limbu |
| 16 | MF | NEP | Avas Lamichhane |
| 17 | FW | NEP | Anjan Bista |
| 18 | FW | NEP | Manish Dangi |
| 19 | FW | NEP | Aashish Chaudhary |
| 20 | FW | NEP | Bimal Gharti Magar |
| 21 | DF | NEP | Rohit Chand |
| 22 | DF | NEP | Simanta Thapa |
| 23 | GK | NEP | Bishal Shrestha |

=== Pakistan ===
Coach: Shahzad Anwar

Pakistan named their squad for the tournament.

Note: Flags indicate national team as defined under FIFA eligibility rules; some limited exceptions apply. Players may hold more than one non-FIFA nationality.

| No. | Pos. | Nation | Player |
|---|---|---|---|
| 1 | GK | PAK | Saqib Hanif |
| 2 | DF | PAK | Muhammad Umar Hayat |
| 3 | DF | PAK | Ali Khan Niazi |
| 4 | DF | PAK | Muhammad Sufyan |
| 5 | DF | PAK | Muhammad Umer Saeed |
| 6 | MF | PAK | Alamgir Ali Khan Ghazi |
| 7 | MF | PAK | Ali Uzair Mahmood |
| 8 | MF | PAK | Moin Ahmed |
| 9 | FW | PAK | Abdul Samad Shahzad |
| 10 | FW | PAK | Otis Jan Mohammad Khan |
| 11 | FW | PAK | Hassan Naweed Bashir |
| 12 | DF | PAK | Mamoon Moosa Khan |

| No. | Pos. | Nation | Player |
|---|---|---|---|
| 13 | GK | PAK | Salman ul Haq |
| 14 | MF | PAK | Shayak Dost |
| 15 | MF | PAK | Muhammad Waleed Khan |
| 16 | MF | PAK | Rahis Nabi |
| 17 | MF | PAK | Harun Arrashid Faheem Hamid |
| 18 | FW | PAK | Muhammad Waheed |
| 19 | DF | PAK | Syed Abdullah Shah |
| 20 | DF | PAK | Haseeb Ahmed Khan |
| 21 | DF | PAK | Sardar Wali |
| 22 | DF | PAK | Sohail |
| 23 | GK | PAK | Abdul Basit |
| — | GK | PAK | Yousaf Ijaz Butt |
| — | DF | PAK | Easah Suliman |
| — | DF | PAK | Abdullah Iqbal |
| — | MF | PAK | Umair Ali |
| — | MF | PAK | Muhammad Adnan Yaqoob |

== Group B ==
=== Bangladesh ===
Coach: (Spain) Javier Cabrera

Bangladesh announced their final squad on 9 June 2023.

Note: Flags indicate national team as defined under FIFA eligibility rules; some limited exceptions apply. Players may hold more than one non-FIFA nationality.

| No. | Pos. | Nation | Player |
|---|---|---|---|
| 1 | GK | BAN | Anisur Rahman Zico |
| 2 | DF | BAN | Topu Barman |
| 3 | DF | BAN | Rahmat Mia |
| 4 | DF | BAN | Tariq Raihan Kazi |
| 5 | DF | BAN | Mehedi Hasan Mithu |
| 6 | MF | BAN | Jamal Bhuiyan (Captain) |
| 7 | MF | BAN | Sohel Rana |
| 8 | MF | BAN | Rabiul Hasan |
| 9 | FW | BAN | Sumon Reza |
| 10 | FW | BAN | Aminur Rahman Sajib |
| 11 | FW | BAN | Foysal Ahmed Fahim |
| 12 | DF | BAN | Bishwanath Ghosh |

| No. | Pos. | Nation | Player |
|---|---|---|---|
| 13 | GK | BAN | Shahidul Alam Sohel |
| 14 | MF | BAN | Mohammad Ridoy |
| 15 | DF | BAN | Alomgir Molla |
| 16 | DF | BAN | Isa Faysal |
| 17 | MF | BAN | Sohel Rana Jr. |
| 18 | FW | BAN | Rafiqul Islam |
| 19 | FW | BAN | Mohammad Ibrahim |
| 20 | FW | BAN | Rakib Hossain |
| 21 | MF | BAN | Mojibur Rahman Jony |
| 22 | MF | BAN | Shekh Morsalin |
| 23 | GK | BAN | Mitul Marma |

=== Lebanon ===
Coach: (Serbia) Aleksandar Ilić

Lebanon announced their final squad on 6 June 2023.

| No. | Pos. | Player | Date of birth (age) | Caps | Goals | Club |
|---|---|---|---|---|---|---|
| 1 | GK | Mehdi Khalil | 19 September 1991 (aged 31) | 50 | 0 | (Jordan Football Association) Al-Faisaly |
| 2 | DF | Abdul Razzak Dakramanji | 22 February 2001 (aged 22) | 0 | 0 | (Lebanese Football Association) Tripoli |
| 3 | DF | Maxime Aoun | 4 March 2001 (aged 22) | 1 | 0 | (Lebanese Football Association) Ansar |
| 4 | DF | Mohammad El Hayek | 19 February 2000 (aged 23) | 5 | 0 | (Lebanese Football Association) Tadamon Sour |
| 5 | MF | Mahdi Zein | 23 May 2000 (aged 23) | 9 | 0 | (Lebanese Football Association) Nejmeh |
| 6 | DF | Hussein Zein | 27 January 1995 (aged 28) | 22 | 0 | (Lebanese Football Association) Ahed |
| 7 | FW | Hassan Maatouk (captain) | 10 August 1987 (aged 35) | 105 | 21 | (Lebanese Football Association) Ansar |
| 8 | FW | Mohamad Omar Sadek | 25 October 2003 (aged 19) | 1 | 0 | (Lebanese Football Association) Nejmeh |
| 9 | FW | Karim Darwich | 2 November 1998 (aged 24) | 12 | 1 | (Lebanese Football Association) Ahed |
| 10 | FW | Ali Al Haj | 2 February 2001 (aged 22) | 5 | 0 | (Lebanese Football Association) Ahed |
| 11 | FW | Ali Markabawi | 19 December 2000 (aged 22) | 3 | 0 | (Lebanese Football Association) Bourj |
| 12 | MF | Hasan Srour | 18 December 2001 (aged 21) | 2 | 0 | (Lebanese Football Association) Ahed |
| 13 | MF | George Felix Melki | 23 July 1994 (aged 28) | 27 | 1 | (Lebanese Football Association) Ahed |
| 14 | MF | Nader Matar | 12 May 1992 (aged 31) | 60 | 3 | (Lebanese Football Association) Ansar |
| 15 | MF | Mouhammed-Ali Dhaini | 1 March 1994 (aged 29) | 21 | 0 | (Swedish Football Association) Trelleborg |
| 16 | MF | Walid Shour | 10 June 1996 (aged 27) | 10 | 0 | (Lebanese Football Association) Ahed |
| 17 | FW | Khalil Bader | 27 July 1999 (aged 23) | 6 | 0 | (Lebanese Football Association) Nejmeh |
| 18 | MF | Ali Shaitou | 5 October 2002 (aged 20) | 0 | 0 | (Lebanese Football Association) Bourj |
| 19 | FW | Zein Farran | 21 July 1999 (aged 23) | 7 | 0 | (Lebanese Football Association) Ahed |
| 20 | MF | Hassan Kourani | 22 January 1995 (aged 28) | 5 | 1 | (Lebanese Football Association) Nejmeh |
| 21 | GK | Ali Sabeh | 24 June 1994 (aged 28) | 6 | 0 | (Lebanese Football Association) Nejmeh |
| 22 | MF | Ali Tneich | 16 July 1992 (aged 30) | 6 | 0 | (Lebanese Football Association) Ansar |
| 23 | GK | Antoine Al Douaihy | 18 March 1999 (aged 24) | 0 | 0 | (Lebanese Football Association) Salam Zgharta |

=== Maldives ===
Coach: (Italy) Francesco Moriero

Maldives named their squad for the tournament.

Note: Flags indicate national team as defined under FIFA eligibility rules; some limited exceptions apply. Players may hold more than one non-FIFA nationality.

| No. | Pos. | Nation | Player |
|---|---|---|---|
| 1 | GK | MDV | Mohamed Faisal |
| 2 | DF | MDV | Ahmed Nooman |
| 3 | DF | MDV | Hussain Sifau Yoosuf |
| 4 | DF | MDV | Haisham Hassan |
| 5 | DF | MDV | Akram Abdul Ghanee |
| 6 | MF | MDV | Ashad Ali |
| 7 | MF | MDV | Ibrahim Aisam |
| 8 | MF | MDV | Mohamed Umair |
| 9 | FW | MDV | Hassan Raaif Ahmed |
| 10 | FW | MDV | Mohamed Naaim |
| 11 | FW | MDV | Ibrahim Mahdhy Hussain |
| 12 | DF | MDV | Samooh Ali |

| No. | Pos. | Nation | Player |
|---|---|---|---|
| 13 | GK | MDV | Mohamed Shafeeu |
| 14 | MF | MDV | Hussain Nihan |
| 15 | MF | MDV | Hamza Mohamed |
| 16 | MF | MDV | Ismail Eesa |
| 17 | MF | MDV | Ibrahim Waheed Hassan |
| 18 | FW | MDV | Assadhulla Abdulla |
| 19 | FW | MDV | Ali Fasir |
| 20 | FW | MDV | Ali Ashfaq |
| 21 | FW | MDV | Naaiz Hassan |
| 22 | FW | MDV | Ali Haisham |
| 23 | GK | MDV | Ali Najih |
| — | DF | MDV | Gasim Sammaam |

=== Bhutan ===
Coach: Cheki Wangmo

Bhutan named their squad for the tournament.

Note: Flags indicate national team as defined under FIFA eligibility rules; some limited exceptions apply. Players may hold more than one non-FIFA nationality.

| No. | Pos. | Nation | Player |
|---|---|---|---|
| 1 | GK | BHU | Gyeltshen Zangpo |
| 2 | DF | BHU | Chimi Tshewang |
| 3 | DF | BHU | Tenzin Norbu |
| 4 | DF | BHU | Tenzin Dorji |
| 5 | DF | BHU | Nima Tshering |
| 6 | MF | BHU | Karma Sonam |
| 7 | MF | BHU | Dorji |
| 8 | MF | BHU | Lobzang Chogyal |
| 9 | FW | BHU | Sherub Dorji |
| 10 | FW | BHU | Tsenda Dorji |
| 11 | FW | BHU | Santa Kumar |
| 12 | DF | BHU | Phuntsho Jingme |

| No. | Pos. | Nation | Player |
|---|---|---|---|
| 13 | GK | BHU | Tshering Dendup |
| 14 | MF | BHU | Karma Shedrup |
| 15 | MF | BHU | Tshelthrim Namgyel |
| 16 | MF | BHU | Tandin Dorji |
| 17 | MF | BHU | Kinga Wangchuk |
| 18 | MF | BHU | Phub Thinley |
| 19 | MF | BHU | Chencho Gyeltshen |
| 20 | MF | BHU | Nima Wangdi |
| 21 | FW | BHU | Yeshi Dorji |
| 23 | GK | BHU | Tobgay |
| — | DF | BHU | Dawa Tshering Jr. |
