= List of football stadiums in Nepal =

The following is a list of football stadiums in Nepal.

== Current stadiums ==
bold	Denotes that the stadium is, or was once, the largest association football stadium in World.
♦	Denotes that the stadium is, or was once, the largest association football stadium in the country or area.

#	Image	Stadium	Capacity	City	Province	Home team(s)	Opened	Ref.
1		Dasharath Rangasala♦	20,000	Tripureshwor, Kathmandu	Bagmati	Nepal national football team, Martyr's Memorial A-Division League, Nepal Super League, National Women's League	1956	
2		Pokhara Rangasala♦	18,500	Pokhara	Gandaki	Nepal national football team, Pokhara Thunders	2004	
3		Karnali Province Stadium	12,000	Birendranagar, Surkhet	Karnali		2025	
4		Sahid Rangasala	12,000	Biratnagar, Morang	Koshi	Biratnagar City FC	1969	
5		Dharan Stadium	10,000	Dharan, Sunsari	Koshi	Dharan F.C.		
6		Chyasal Stadium	6,000	Chyasal, Lalitpur	Bagmati	Lalitpur City FC	2002	
7		Narayani Stadium	10,000	Birgunj, Parsa	Madhesh	Birgunj United FC	1981	
8		Tharuhat Stadium	10,000	Triyuga, Udayapur	Koshi			
9		Nepalgunj Stadium	10,000	Nepalgunj	Lumbini		2024	
10		Dhangadhi Stadium	10,000	Dhangadhi, Kailali	Sudurpashchim	Dhangadhi FC		
11		Itahari Football Stadium	10,000	Itahari, Sunsari	Koshi			
12		Chandragadhi Stadium	5,000	Bhadrapur Jhapa	Koshi			
13		Mai Valley Ground	5,000	Illam	Koshi	Sporting Ilam De Mechi FC		
14		Domalal Rajbanshi Stadium	5,000	Birtamod, Jhapa	Koshi	Jhapa FC		
15		Raj Rangasala	5,000	Rajbiraj, Saptari	Madhesh			
16		ANFA Complex	5,000	Satdobato, Lalitpur	Bagmati	Nepal national football team	1999	
17		Halchowk Stadium	5,000	Kathmandu	Bagmati	APF Club		
18		ANFA Technical Centre	5,000	Butwal	Lumbini	Butwal Lumbini FC		
19		Beljhundi Stadium	5,000	Beljhundi, Dang	Lumbini			
20		Camp Danda Football Stadium	5,000	Hetauda, Makwanpur	Bagmati	FC Chitwan		
21		Dhankuta Stadium	5,000	Tundikhel, Dhankuta	Koshi			

== Proposed stadiums ==
Stadium	Capacity	City	Province	Home team	Opened	Ref.
Kathmandu Valley International Football Stadium	50,000	Suryabinayak	Bagmati	Nepal national football team		
Jabai Multipurpose Stadium	12,000	Jabai, Butwal	Lumbini			
Ghorahi Stadium	8,000	Dang	Lumbini			
Shree Ram Janaki International Stadium	N/A	Janakpur	Madhesh			
Rapti International Stadium	N/A	Rapti Rural Municipality	Lumbini			
Purandhara Rangasala	N/A	Rapti Rural Municipality	Lumbini			

== See also ==
- Football in Nepal
- List of Asian stadiums by capacity
- List of association football stadiums by capacity
- Lists of stadiums
