= List of foreign Nepal Super League players =

This is a list of foreign players in the Nepal Super League. The following players:

1. Are considered foreign, i.e., outside Nepal:

A player is considered foreign if he is not eligible to play for the national team of Nepal.

More specifically,

- If a player has been capped on international level, the national team is used; if he has been capped by more than one country, the highest level (or the most recent) team is used.
- If a player has not been capped on international level, his country of birth is used.

== Current foreign players ==
Club	Player 1	Player 2	Player 3	Former
Biratnagar kings	(Australia) DAVID WARNER	(Bangladesh) SHAKIB AL HASAN	(Oman) Aqib Illyas	
Butwal Lumbini	(Chad) Armand Beadum	(Ghana) William Opoku		(Nigeria) Kareem Omolaja
Dhangadhi FC	(Nigeria) Afeez Oladipo	(Cameroon) Ernest Tampi	(Cameroon) Franklin Kuete Talla	
FC Chitwan	(Egypt) Ahmed Mohamed "Bogy" Gaballa	(Egypt) El Sayed Shaaban	(Cameroon) Ruddy Mbakop	(France) Goran Jerković
Kathmandu Rayzrs	(Ivory Coast) Florent Koara	(Cameroon) Messouke Olomou	(Cameroon) Stephane Samir	
Lalitpur City	(Azerbaijan) Nurlan Novruzov	(Nigeria) Peter Segun	(Croatia) Vilim Posinković	
Pokhara Thunders	(Cameroon) Bidias Raphael	(Cameroon) Ketcha Wannick	(Cameroon) Moussa Abagana	

== Past foreign players ==
- (Italy) Bikash Meraglia
