= Olivier Kingue =

Cameroonian footballer (born 1996)

Personal information
- Full name: Juan Olivier Simo Kingue
- Date of birth: 20 February 1996 (age 30)
- Place of birth: Yaoundé, Cameroon
- Height: 1.88 m (6 ft 2 in)
- Position: Centre back

Youth career
- Nkufo Academy
- 2016: → Standard Liège (loan)

Senior career*
Years	Team	Apps	(Gls)
–2017	Nkufo Academy		
2016–2017	→ Olhanense (loan)	4	(0)
2017–2019	Slavia Prague II		
2018	→ Ústí nad Labem (loan)	16	(2)
2019	→ Příbram (loan)	10	(1)
2019	Příbram	17	(0)
- * Club domestic league appearances and goals

Juan Olivier Simo Kingue (born 20 February 1996), known as Olivier Kingue, is a Cameroonian professional football player who plays for Nepal Super League club Kathmandu Rayzrs F.C.

== Club career ==
He made his professional debut in the Segunda Liga for Olhanense on 28 January 2017 in a game against Sporting Covilhã.
