= Hans Kwofie =

Ghanaian footballer (born 1989)

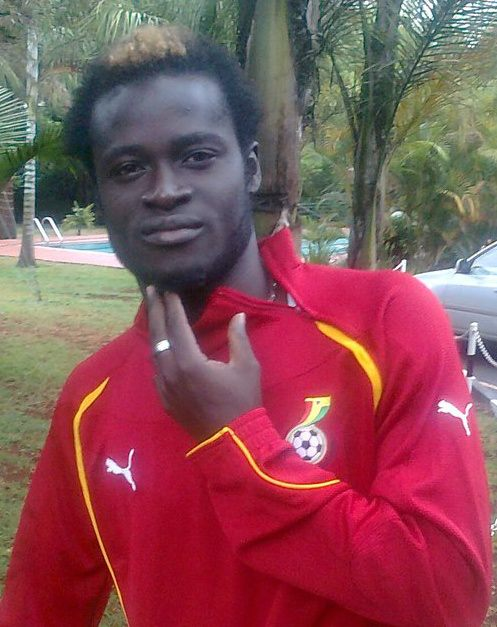
- Kwofie in 2019

Personal information
- Date of birth: 10 June 1989
- Place of birth: Tarkwa, Ghana
- Date of death: 21 June 2024 (aged 35)
- Place of death: Dadwen, Ghana
- Height: 1.78 m (5 ft 10 in)
- Positions: Attacking midfielder; winger

Youth career
- 2000–2003: Zongo JS

Senior career*
Years	Team	Apps	(Gls)
2003–2004	Nsoatre Manchester United	11	(1)
2005–2006	King Solomon	20	(2)
2006–2007	Tuba Metro Stars	27	(5)
2007–2009	Heart of Lions	37	(6)
2009–2015	Medeama	51	(8)
2015–2016	Al-Oruba	22	(11)
2016	Bechem Utd	11	(1)
2016–2017	Ashanti Gold	26	(17)
2018	Smouha SC	3	(0)
2018	Singida United	33	(28)
2019	Puchong Fuerza	13	(12)
2020–2021	Ashanti Gold	9	(5)
2021–2022	Legon Cities FC	36	(13)
2022–2023	Medeama SC	8	(0)
2023	Aduana Stars F.C.	5	(0)
2023–2024	Birgunj United FC	2	(1)

International career
2009–2010	Ghana U-20	3	(1)
2015	Ghana	2	(0)
- * Club domestic league appearances and goals

Hans Kwofie (10 June 1989 – 21 June 2024) was a Ghanaian professional footballer who played as a forward for Birgunj United FC in the Nepal Super League. He was the top goal scorer in the 2017 Ghanaian Premier League.

== Club career ==
=== Early career ===
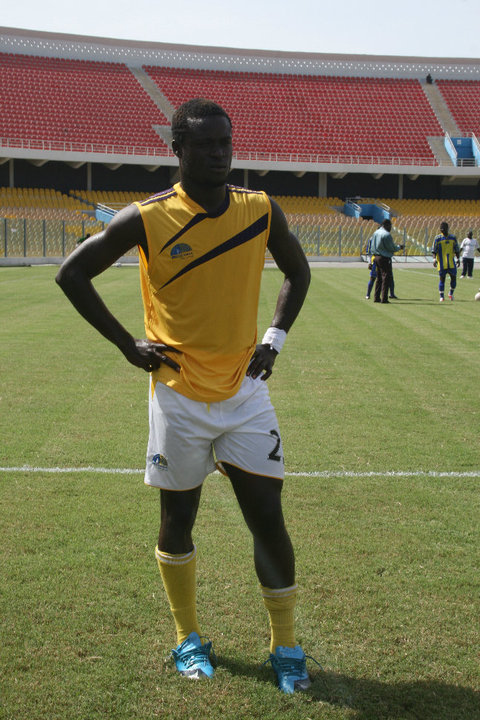
Hans Kwofie - Medeama SC

Born and raised in Tarkwa, Ghana, Hans began his professional footballing career in 2003 with Nsoatre-based, Ghana Division Two League club, Nsoatre Manchester United F.C. In 2005, he moved to Nkawkaw where he signed a one-year contract with Ghana Division One League club, King Solomon F.C. In 2006, he moved to Kasoa where he signed a one-year contract with another Ghana Division One League club, Tuba Metro Stars F.C.

=== Heart of Lions ===
In 2007, he moved to Kpandu where he signed a two-year contract with Ghana Premier League and one of Ghana's most renown clubs, Heart of Lions F.C.

=== Medeama SC ===
In 2009, he moved back to his hometown, Tarkwa where he signed a long-term contract with another Ghana Premier League club, Medeama SC. He helped his side secure the 4th position in the 2010–11 Ghanaian Premier League and also finished as the club top scorer in the 2010–11 season. During the 2015 Ghanaian Premier League, news speculated that hard-tackling midfielder was alleged to have been linked with a possible move to one of the two most glamorous clubs in the country, Asante Kotoko SC and Accra Hearts of Oak SC following reports indicating a bid had been made to Medeama seeking for the player's services. But the Tarkwa-born midfielder denied all the rumors hinting that he had not been approached by either side. Also during the 2015–16 season, Hans threatened to summon the Ghana Premier League club before the Ghana Football Association if the club failed to pay his signing fee.

=== Al-Oruba SC ===
After failing to extend his contract with Ghana Premier League club, Medeama SC for the fifth consecutive season he decided to make his first move out of Ghana in 2015 to the Middle East and more accurately to Oman where on 9 September 2015, he signed a one-year contract with Sur-based, Oman Professional League club, Al-Oruba SC. He made his Oman Professional League debut on 13 September 2015 in a 3–1 win over newly promoted side, Salalah SC and scored his first goal on 18 October 2015 in a 3–1 win over another Salalah-based club, Al-Nasr S.C.S.C.

=== Bechem United ===
In May 2016, Kwofie returned to Ghana and signed a short-term contract with Bechem United.

=== Ashanti Gold ===
In 2017, ahead of the 2017 Ghanaian Premier League, Kwofie signed for Obuasi-based side Ashanti Gold. At the end of the season he emerged as the top goalscorer of the league with 17 goals ahead of Heart of Oak midfielder and skipper, Thomas Abbey and Berekum Chelsea striker, Stephen Sarfo who scored 13 and 15 goals respectively. Within the season he scored 4 goals in a match against Berekum Chelsea and Aduana Stars and a hat trick against Great Olympics to help him win top scorer of the premiership that campaign.

=== Smouha SC ===
In January 2018, after emerging top goal scorer of the Ghana Premier League, Kwofie along with 2013–14 Ghana Premier league top scorer Augustine Okrah signed for Smouha SC on a 3-year contract. After a few months of joining the club he mutually terminated his contract and parted ways with the club following a string of unimpressive performances.

=== Singida United ===
After parting ways with the Egyptian-side Smouha SC, he joined Tanzanian top flight side Singida United. In August 2018, whilst playing for the club, the club reported on their official Twitter page that Kwofie had been kidnapped after his name was on their 2018–19 season squad. He later came out to debunk the kidnapping allegations. The club subsequently came out also to retract and take down their report whilst stating that he had joined the club for training.

=== Puchong Fuerza ===
In 2019, Kwofie moved to the Malaysia and joined Malaysia M3 League side Puchong Fuerza. He played there for one season and scored 12 league goals, scoring a hat trick in one match. Overall, he scored 13 goals in all competitions. He left the club in the after the season ended in late 2019.

=== Return to Ashanti Gold ===
In February 2020, it was reported that Kwofie would be joining his former club Ashanti Gold. In July 2020, he confirmed in an interview with Wontumi TV that he had joined Ashanti Gold on a 1.5 year contract as the Miners sought to boost their squad ahead of their CAF Confederations Cup campaign. After scoring 5 goals in 8 matches in the first round of the season, he moved to Legon Cities in 2021 bringing an end to his 1.5 year contract deal.

=== Legon Cities ===
On 17 February 2021, it was announced that Kwofie had signed for Accra-based club Legon Cities after his contract with Ashanti Gold had ended, joining his previous coach Bashir Hayford, who coached him whilst at Ashanti Gold in 2017 and under whose guidance he netted 17 goals to win the top goal scorer during the 2017 Ghana Premier League. He scored on his league debut and was named man of the match in a 1–1 draw against his old club Bechem United on 21 February 2021.

== International career ==
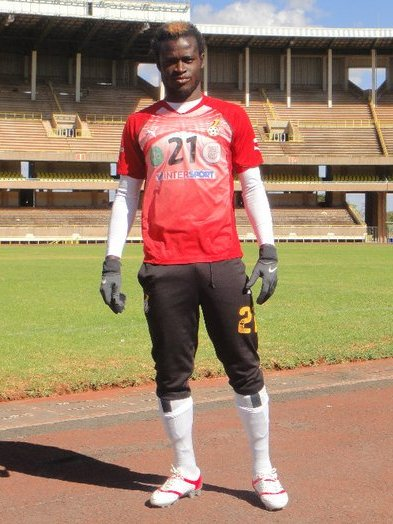
Hans Kwofie - Ghana

Hans was selected for the national team for the first time in 2015 as he was named first in the provisional squad and later in the 20-man squad for the 2015 COSAFA Cup which was to be held in North West Province of South Africa. He made his debut for the Ghana national football team on 25 May 2015 in a 2–1 loss against Madagascar in the Quarter-Finals stage of the 2015 COSAFA Cup. He made another appearance in the tournament in a 3–0 loss against Zambia.

== Style of play ==
Hans primarily played as a midfielder and right winger, noted for his role in initiating counterattacks. He utilized a passing-oriented style of play supported by his vision and technical abilities.

== Death ==
Kwofie died on 21 June 2024 in a car accident in Dadwen.

== Club career statistics ==
Club	Season	Division	League		Cup		Continental		Other		Total	
Club	Season	Division	Apps	Goals	Apps	Goals	Apps	Goals	Apps	Goals	Apps	Goals
Al-Oruba	2015-16	Oman Professional League	6	4	1	0	0	0	0	0	7	4
Al-Oruba	Total		6	4	1	0	0	0	0	0	7	4
Career total			6	4	1	0	0	0	0	0	7	4
