= Kiran Chemjong =

Nepalese footballer (born 1990)

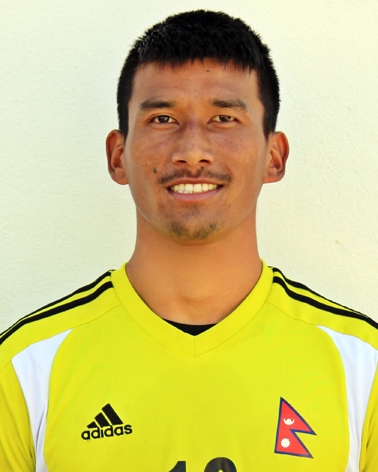
- Chemjong with Nepal in 2015

Personal information
- Full name: Kiran Kumar Chemjong Limbu
- Date of birth: 24 March 1990 (age 36)
- Place of birth: Dhankuta, Nepal
- Height: 6 ft 1 in (1.85 m)
- Position: Goalkeeper

Team information
- Current team: Nagaland United
- Number: 16

Youth career
- –2008: ANFA Academy

Senior career*
Years	Team	Apps	(Gls)
2008–2009	Machhindra		
2009–2016	Three Star		
2016–2017	Manang Marshyangdi		
2017–2018	TC		
2018	Minerva Punjab	8	(0)
2018–2019	TC Sports Club		
2019–2020	Minerva Punjab	29	(0)
2021	Dhangadhi	8	(0)
2021–2022	Maziya		
2022–2024	Punjab	27	(0)
2025	Bangladesh Police	2	(0)
2025–2026	Victory		
2026–	Nagaland United		

International career^{‡}
2008–	Nepal	107	(0)
Medal record
Men's football
Representing Nepal
SAFF Championship
Runner-up	2021 Maldives
AFC Solidarity Cup
Winner	2016 Malaysia
- * Club domestic league appearances and goals ‡ National team caps and goals as of 6 September 2025

Kiran Kumar Limbu (Nepali: किरण चेम्जोङ लिम्बु ; born 20 March 1990), also known as Kiran Chemjong, is a Nepalese professional footballer who plays as a goalkeeper for Nagaland United and the Nepal national team.

== Club career ==
Born in Dhankuta, Chemjong graduated from the ANFA Academy and joined the Machhindra. After spending one year at the club, his impressive performances at Chemjong earned him a move to the Three Star Club in 2007. He has won British Gurkha Cup and Aaha Gold Cup Football Tournament. After being the best goalkeeper of south Asia of the time, Kiran was offered by TC Sports Club in January 2017. He played his first game for TC Sports Club in February 2017 and showed impressive performance, helping the club to win the match by 1–0.

=== Minerva Punjab ===
On January 23, 2018, he signed a deal with Hero I League club, Minerva Punjab for an undisclosed amount. He made his debut for the club in an away fixture against NEROCA. He saved a penalty in the 50th minute against East Bengal, which was taken by Katsumi Yusa. He was adjudged as the hero-of-the-match for that fine save. Kiran made total of 8 appearances for the club. He eventually won the 2017–18 I-League with Minerva.

=== RoundGlass Punjab ===
In September 2022, he signed for I-League club RoundGlass Punjab. He was part of the team that clinched their second I-League trophy in 2022–23 season, and gained promotion to 2023–24 Indian Super League.

Chemjong made his Indian Super League debut on 23 September, in their 3–1 away defeat to Mohun Bagan in Kolkata.

=== Bangladesh Police ===
In 2025, joined Bangladesh Police for the 2025–26 Bangladesh Football League.

=== Victory ===
On 13 December 2025 he made his debut for Victory in the 2–0 victory against Club Eagles.

== International career ==
He is currently considered as the first-choice goalkeeper in Nepal. He has a height advantage over more senior keepers like Bikash Malla and Ritesh Thapa. He has produced brilliant displays against oppositions bringing wide acclaims. Chemjong played debut match for Nepal in a 3–2 victory against Macau in 2008 AFC Challenge Cup qualifiers held in Phnom Penh, Cambodia, although he broke his jaw in the match. He debuted at the home ground in a 1–0 win against Afghanistan during the 2012 AFC Challenge Cup qualification.

In the 2012 Nehru Cup, Chemjong won the man of the match award in Nepal's game with India. His performance in the match earned praise from the Indian newspaper The Hindu and from the Maldives head coach István Urbányi.

On 26 March 2024, he earned his 100th international cap in a 3–0 away defeat against Bahrain during the 2026 World Cup qualification, becoming the first Nepalese to achieve this feat. However, according to the All Nepal Football Association (ANFA), he played his centurion match on 11 June later that year, which ended in a 2–2 away draw against Yemen in the same qualifiers.

== Personal life ==
In 2015, along with Three Star teammate Bishnu Gurung, Chemjong paid a visit to malnourished children in an orphanage in Pokhara, saying afterwards that it was a "day to remember". On 31 August 2022, He married his long time girlfriend Kanchan Niraula.

== Career statistics ==
=== International ===
Appearances and goals by national team and year
National team	Year	Apps	Goals
Nepal	2008	1	0
Nepal	2011	14	0
Nepal	2012	5	0
Nepal	2013	10	0
Nepal	2014	4	0
Nepal	2015	6	0
Nepal	2016	5	0
Nepal	2017	6	0
Nepal	2018	5	0
Nepal	2019	9	0
Nepal	2020	2	0
Nepal	2021	14	0
Nepal	2022	4	0
Nepal	2023	13	0
Nepal	2024	6	0
Total		104	0

== Honours ==
Minerva Punjab/RoundGlass Punjab

- I-League: 2017–18, 2022–23

TC Sports

- Dhivehi Premier League: 2018

Maziya S&RC

- Dhivehi Premier League: 2022

Individual

- Dhivehi Premier League Best Goalkeeper: 2018, 2022
- I-League Best Goalkeeper: 2019–20, 2022–23
- Nepal Super League Best Goalkeeper: 2021
