= Bishal Sunar =

Nepali footballer (born 2002)

Personal information
- Full name: Bishal Sunar
- Date of birth: 9 February 2002 (age 24)
- Place of birth: Siyari, Nepal
- Height: 1.78 m (5 ft 10 in)
- Position: Goalkeeper

Team information
- Current team: NIBL Friends
- Number: 16

Senior career*
Years	Team	Apps	(Gls)
2018–2019	Tribhuwan Army		
2019–2021	Brigade Boys	13	(0)
2021	→ Chitwan (loan)	5	(0)
2021–2023	Manang Marshyangdi	8	(0)
2022–2023	→ Lalitpur City (loan)	1	(0)
2023–	NIBL Friends	12	(0)

International career^{‡}
2018	Nepal U17		(0)
2020	Nepal U20	3	(0)
2022–	Nepal	1	(0)
- * Club domestic league appearances and goals as of 23 December 2023 ‡ National team caps and goals as of 3 June 2022

Bishal Sunar (Nepali: बिशाल सुनार; born 9 February 2002) is a Nepalese professional footballer who plays as a goalkeeper for Martyr's Memorial A-Division League club NIBL Friends and the Nepal national team.

== Club career ==
Bishal was included in the preliminary squad for the 2023 Prime Minister's Three Nations Cup, however, failed to make the final squad. Eventually, he was listed in the A-category for the 2023 Nepal Super League and thus was contracted by FC Chitwan for Rs 200,000. He played five games for the club. In his debut match, he saved a penalty from Lalitpur City's captain Anjan Bista. But, he was sent off in the fifth match, against Pokhara Thunders.

He previously represented Siddhartha FC in the 1st Mukti, Rajendra, Rajesh & Om Prakash memorial cup Football Tournament in Rupandehi.

== International career ==
Bishal represented Nepal at youth level from 2018 to 2020, before making his Nepal national team debut on 3 June 2022, during a 0–2 defeat to Oman in a Friendly match.

== Honours ==
Lalitpur City

- Nepal Super League: 2023
