= Narayani Stadium =

Multi-purpose stadium in Birgunj, Nepali

- Birgunj Stadium
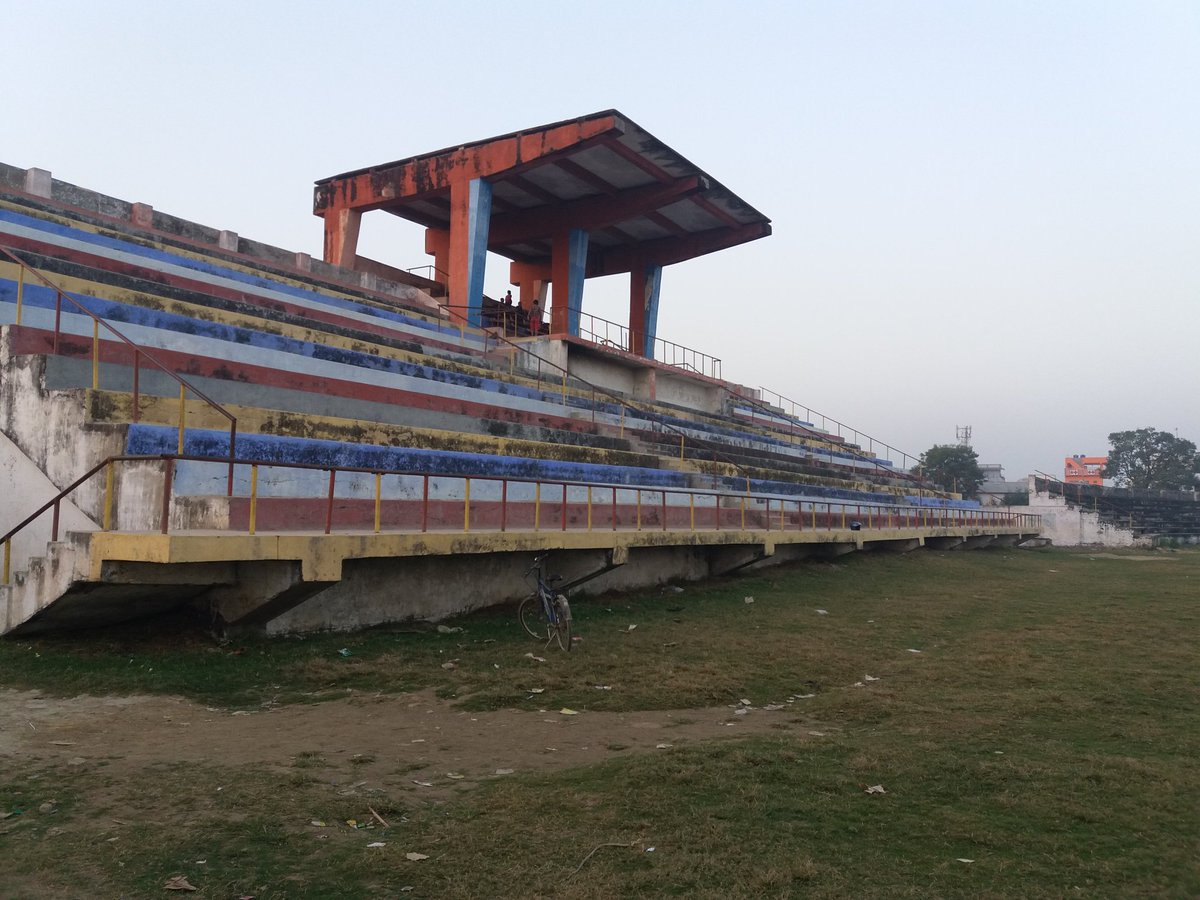
- Narayani Stadium
- Interactive map of Narayani Stadium
- Full name: Narayani Stadium Birgunj
- Location: Birgunj, Parsa, Madhesh Province, Nepal
- Coordinates: 27°01′54″N 84°53′38″E
- Elevation: 87 m (285 ft)
- Capacity: 18,000
- Scoreboard: Yes

Construction
- Opened: 1981
- Renovated: December 2015

Tenant
- Birgunj United FC

Narayani Stadium is a multi-purpose stadium located in Birgunj, in Nepal's Madhesh Province. It is among the largest stadiums of Nepal with 18,000 capacity, together with Dasarath Rangasala Stadium. In terms of area, it is the largest in Nepal. It was built in 2038 (1981). It has conducted national games and sports of Nepal, and some international friendly games. The stadium underwent renovation starting in December 2015.

The 1986 National Games of Nepal were held at the stadium.

== 2026 National Games of Nepal ==
It will be 2nd time to host the National Games of Nepal by this stadium.

== See also ==
- List of football stadiums in Nepal
