= Bharat Khawas =

Nepalese footballer & Army Officer

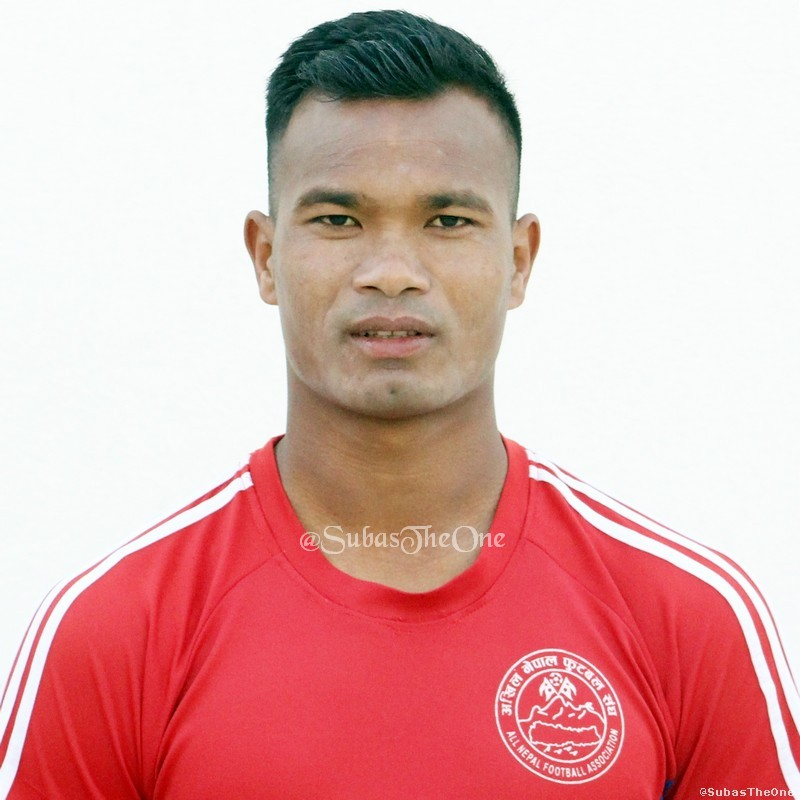
- Born: Bharat Khawas; 29 October 1991 (age 34); Haraincha, Morang
- Military career
- Allegiance: Nepal
- Branch: Nepali Army
- Service years: 2012–present
- Rank: Captain
Association football career
- Position: Striker
Team information
- Current team: Nepal Army
- Number: 21
Youth career
- 2006–2007: Sankata Boys
Senior career*
Years	Team	Apps	(Gls)
2007–2011	Friends		
2011–2012	Nepal Police		
2012–2023	Nepal Army	1	(0)
2023–24	Sporting Ilam De Mechi	7	(0)
2024–	Nepal Army	3	(0)
International career^{‡}
2008–	Nepal	63	(10)
- * Club domestic league appearances and goals ‡ National team caps and goals as of 21 June 2024

Captain Bharat Khawas (Nepali: भरत खवास) (born 22 July 1991) is a Nepalese army officer and international footballer. He plays for Tribhuvan Army in Martyr's Memorial A-Division League as a striker. In 2023, He was on loan with Sporting Ilum De Mechi. He is currently a captain in the Nepal Army.

== Club career ==
Bharat Khawas is an ANFA academy product who has represented Nepal in different age limit competitions and the national team. He rejected a European club chance for the sake of playing in AFC Challenge Cup 2012. Later it was found that the club was none other than Valletta FC from Maltese Premier League. The club had offered him a salary of 150,000 Nepali Rupees per month. He signed for Tribhuwan Army from Nepal Police club having offered second lieutenant post at Nepal Army.

On 7 June 2014 in the Khawas scored a last minute winner in Nepal Army Club's 3–1 win over arch rivals (and Khawas's former team) Nepal Police Club in the 2014 Bir Ganesh Man Singh Gold Cup Final. As the winning team the Nepali Army Club will receive 5 Lakhs (500,000 rupees) prize. Afterwards Khawas thanked the Army for allowing him to play on the team while completing his cadet course.

== International ==
He wears the number 21 jersey for the international team.

=== International goals ===
Scores and results list Nepal's goal tally first.

#	Date	Venue	Opponent	Score	Result	Competition
1.	25 March 2008	Pokhara Rangasala, Pokhara	Pakistan	1–1	2–1	Friendly
2.	7 April 2011	Dasarath Rangasala Stadium, Kathmandu	Afghanistan	1–0	1–0	2012 AFC Challenge Cup qualification
3.	28 July 2011	Dasarath Rangasala Stadium, Kathmandu	Jordan	1–1	1–1	2014 FIFA World Cup qualification
4.	6 December 2011	Jawaharlal Nehru Stadium, New Delhi	Pakistan	1–0	1–1	2011 SAFF Championship
5.	2 March 2013	Dasarath Rangasala Stadium, Kathmandu	Northern Mariana Islands	1–0	6–0	2014 AFC Challenge Cup qualification
6.	2 March 2013	Dasarath Rangasala Stadium, Kathmandu	Northern Mariana Islands	3–0	6–0	2014 AFC Challenge Cup qualification
7.	2 March 2013	Dasarath Rangasala Stadium, Kathmandu	Northern Mariana Islands	6–0	6–0	2014 AFC Challenge Cup qualification
8.	31 August 2013	Dasarath Rangasala Stadium, Kathmandu	Bangladesh	2–0	2–0	2013 SAFF Championship
9.	8 November 2016	Sarawak Stadium, Kuching	Brunei	2–0	3–0	2016 AFC Solidarity Cup
10.	6 September 2018	Bangabandhu National Stadium, Dhaka, Bangladesh	Bhutan	3–0	4–0	2018 SAFF Championship

== Award ==
- 2013–14 Martyr's Memorial A-Division League: Best Forward
- 2018–19 Martyr's Memorial A-Division League: Best Forward
- 2019–20 Martyr's Memorial A-Division League: Best Forward
