= Tej Tamang =

Nepali footballer

Personal information
- Date of birth: 14 February 1998 (age 28)
- Place of birth: Nepal
- Height: 1.68 m (5 ft 6 in)
- Position: Midfielder

Senior career*
Years	Team	Apps	(Gls)
2018–2021	Nepal Police		
2021	Kathmandu Rayzrs		

International career
2018	Nepal U23	3	(0)
2018–	Nepal	17	(1)
- * Club domestic league appearances and goals

Tej Tamang (born 14 February 1998) is a Nepali professional footballer who plays for Birgunj United FC and the retired Nepal national team. He has previously also played for the Nepal U-23 team.

== Honours ==
- Nepal Super League Champions (1) 2021
