= Ayush Ghalan =

Nepalese footballer

Personal information
- Date of birth: 21 February 2004 (age 22)
- Place of birth: Nepal
- Height: 1.68 m (5 ft 6 in)
- Position: Forward

Senior career*
Years	Team	Apps	(Gls)
2021	Pokhara Thunders	6	(0)
2021–2022	Three Star Club	12	(1)
2023	Sankata Boys		
2023	Machhindra		
2024	Pokhara Thunders	10	(2)
2024	Church Boys United		
2024	Gangtok Himalayan		
2025–2026	Bangladesh Police		

International career^{‡}
2021–2024	Nepal U20		
2022–	Nepal	32	(2)
- * Club domestic league appearances and goals ‡ National team caps and goals as of 10 June 2025

Ayush Ghalan (born 21 February 2004) is a Nepali professional footballer who plays as a forward for Nepal national team.

== Club career ==
Ghalan played several local tournaments from various teams. He made his official first team domestic debut in the Nepal Super League with Pokhara Thunders.

=== Pokhara Thunders ===
Ghalan was bought in the inaugural season of the Nepal Super League. He made his debut against Butwal Lumbini FC. Ghalan played a total of six matches.

=== Three Star Club ===
Ghalan was signed by Three Star Club for Nepalese first tier league Martyr's Memorial A-Division League.

=== Sankata Boys SC ===
Ghalan joined Sankata Boys SC for the 2023 Martyr's Memorial A-Division League where he would go on to make 22 appearances and score 3 goals. Outside the A-Division, he would also win the 2023 Aaha! Gold Cup.

=== Macchindra F.C ===
He later joined Machhindra F.C. for their 2023–24 AFC Cup qualifying play-offs campaign which lasted only two matches. Ghalan would score his first and only goal in a 3-2 win against Paro FC in the 15th minute.

=== Pokhara Thunders ===
Ghalan would later re-sign for his first club, Pokhara Thunders, for the 2023–24 Nepal Super League. He got 3 man of the match awards, with 2 goals and an assist to his name.

=== Sankata FC ===
Ghalan would appear in the 2024 Aaha! Gold Cup for Sankata FC. However, they would lose in their first match 3–0 to Tribhuwan Army Club.

=== Bangladesh Police FC ===
In August 2025, Ghalan joined Bangladesh Police for the 2025–26 Bangladesh Premier League.

== Honours ==
Sankata Boys

- Aaha! Gold Cup: 2023

== International career ==
He made his international debut against Australia for the 2022 FIFA World Cup qualification, in June 2021. Ghalan scored his first international goal on 4 October 2021 against Sri Lanka in the 2021 SAFF Championship at the National Football Stadium.

== International goals ==
Scores and results list Nepal's goal tally first.

No.	Date	Venue	Opponent	Score	Result	Competition
1.	4 October 2021	National Football Stadium, Malé, Maldives	Sri Lanka	3–1	3–2	2021 SAFF Championship
2.	31 March 2023	Dasharath Rangasala, Kathmandu, Nepal	Laos	1–1	2–1	Friendly
