= 1986 National Games of Nepal =

Sports event

3rd National Games of Nepal
- Host city: Birgunj
- Country: Kingdom of Nepal
- Teams: 14
- Athletes: 2,775
- Sport: 21
- Opened by: King Birendra Bir Bikram Shah
- Main venue: Narayani Stadium, Birgunj

The 1986 National Games of Nepal, also known as the 3rd National Games of Nepal was a national multi-sport event, held in Birgunj, Narayani Zone.

== Venues ==
Birgunj
Narayani Stadium
Capacity: 20,000+

== Participating teams ==
Teams from all 14 Zones participated in this edition of National Games of Nepal.

- Mechi Zone
- Kosi Zone
- Sagarmatha Zone
- Janakpur Zone
- Narayani Zone
- Bagmati Zone
- Gandaki Zone
- Dhaulagiri Zone
- Lumbini Zone
- Rapti Zone
- Bheri Zone
- Karnali Zone
- Seti Zone
- Mahakali Zone

== Medal table ==
1986 National Games medal table
Rank	Zone	Gold	Silver	Bronze	Total
1	Bagmati Zone	66	35	37	138
2	Kosi Zone	18	28	27	73
3	Narayani Zone*	13	22	29	64
4	Bheri Zone	10	5	10	25
5	Sagarmatha Zone	8	0	7	15
6	Gandaki Zone	7	24	26	57
7	Lumbini Zone	6	8	10	24
8	Seti Zone	5	10	6	21
9	Mechi Zone	4	9	11	24
10	Rapti Zone	3	2	3	8
10	Dhaulagiri Zone	3	2	3	8
12	Janakpur Zone	2	5	6	13
13	Mahakali Zone	1	0	2	3
14	Karnali Zone	0	0	1	1
Total (14 zones)		146	150	178	474
