= Patrick De Wilde =

Association football player

Personal information
- Date of birth: 19 April 1964 (age 62)
- Place of birth: Belgium

Managerial career
- Years: Team
- 2006–2007: Eendracht Aalst
- 2007–2008: Metalurh Donetsk (assistant)
- 2008: Aspire Academy
- 2010: Beveren (assistant)
- 2010–2011: Tianjin Tianhai
- 2011–2012: Red Bull Salzburg (youth)
- 2012: Liefering
- Red Bull Salzburg (scout)
- 2016: Kortrijk
- 2016: Khaleej
- 2016–2017: Algeria (assistant)
- 2017: Hunan Billows
- 2018: Hungary (assistant)
- 2018: Étoile du Sahel
- 2019: Tractor (assistant)
- 2019–2021: Lithuania (technical director)
- 2021–2023: Raja Casablanca (technical director)
- 2023: China U-23 (assistant)
- 2023: Rwanda MNT
- 2023–2024: Somalia MNT
- 2025: Nepal WNT
- 2025-2026: Völsungur
- 2026: Chinese Taipei

Patrick De Wilde (born 19 April 1964) is a Belgian football coach.

== Career ==
In 2007, De Wilde was appointed assistant manager of Ukrainian side Metalurh (Donetsk) after managing Eendracht Aalst in the Belgian lower leagues.

In 2008, he was appointed technical director of a Belgian field hockey club after working as youth coach of the Aspire Academy in Qatar.

In 2010, De Wilde was appointed manager of Chinese third division outfit Tianjin Tianhai after working as assistant manager at Beveren in the Belgian top flight, where he underwent brain tumor removal surgery and helped them achieve promotion to the Chinese second division.

In 2011, he was appointed youth coach of Red Bull Salzburg, one of Austria's most successful clubs.

In 2012, De Wilde was appointed manager of Liefering in the Austrian lower leagues, before working as a scout of Red Bull Salzburg.

In 2016, he was appointed manager Saudi Arabian side Khaleej after managing KV Kortrijk in Belgium.

In 2017, he was appointed manager of Chinese third division club Hunan Billows after working as assistant manager of Algeria.

In 2018, De Wilde was appointed manager of ESS in Tunisia after working as assistant manager of Hungary.

In 2019, he was appointed technical director of Lithuania after working as assistant manager of Iranian team Tractor.

In 2025, Belgian tactician De Wilde was appointed as the Head Coach of the Nepal Women’s National Football Team, a landmark decision by the ANFA aimed at ushering in a new chapter of growth and ambition for women’s football in the country.

De Wilde’s early tenure focused on identifying emerging talent, fostering a competitive culture, and introducing a possession-based style of play that emphasized strategic build-up and resilience.

In December 2025, he was appointed manager of Völsungur. He left the club in April 2026, before the start of the regular season.
