= Tobgay =

Tobgay (Tibetan: སྟོབས་རྒྱས, Wylie: stobs rgyas, ZYPY: Dobgyai), also spelled Tobgye, Topgye, or Topgay, is a Tibetan name. People who have this name as one of their given names include:

- Polhané Sönam Topgyé (1689–1747), Tibetan prince
- Kencho Tobgay (born 1991), Bhutanese footballer
- Sonam Tobgay (born 1990), Bhutanese cricketer and footballer
- Sonam Tobgye (born 1949), Bhutanese jurist
- Tshering Tobgay (born 1965), Bhutanese prime minister
- Sonam Topgay Dorji (1896–1953), Bhutanese politician
