= King Solomon F.C. =

- Full name: King Solomon F.C.
- Ground: Nkawkaw, Ghana
- League: Division One League Zone 3B

King Solomon F.C. is a Ghanaian professional football team based in Nkawkaw that plays in the 3B Zone of the Ghana Division One League. Zone 3B has seven competing teams from the part of the Greater Accra Region and the Volta Region of Ghana.
