= Dinesh Rajbanshi =

Nepalese footballer

Personal information
- Date of birth: 5 April 1998 (age 28)
- Height: 1.76 m (5 ft 9 in)
- Position: Defender

Team information
- Current team: Dhangadhi
- Number: 2

Senior career*
Years	Team	Apps	(Gls)
2018	Nepal Police Club		
2019–2020	Chyasal Youth Club		
2021–	Dhangadh	8	(0)

International career^{‡}
2019	Nepal U23	0	(0)
2018–	Nepal	15	(0)
- * Club domestic league appearances and goals as of 18:04, 29 May 2021 (UTC) ‡ National team caps and goals as of 18:04, 2 September 2021 (UTC)

Dinesh Rajbanshi (born April 8, 1998) is a Nepalese professional footballer who plays as a defender for Dhangadhi FC and the Nepal national team. He has also played for the Nepal U-23 team.
