= Ranjan Bista =

Nepalese footballer and coach

Ranjan Bista is a highly decorated former member of the Nepal national football team, and an NHA coach.

== History ==
A former Boys Union Club (BUC) custodian, Bista is also the founder of the two-time ‘A' Division League champions Sunakhari Club. Bista also helped BUC claim the ‘A' Division League in 1975 under the All Nepal Football Association (ANFA). Bista represented Nepal in the DCM Cup (New Delhi) in 1975, Agatha Gold Cup (Dhaka) in 1979, Presidents Cup (Bangladesh) in 1979, Asian Youth Football (Bangladesh) 1980, King's Cup (Bangkok) in 1982, the ninth Asiad (Delhi) in 1982 and the Darjeeling Gold Cup in 1982.
