= Pradip Humagain =

American soccer coach

Personal information
- Full name: Pradip Humagain
- Date of birth: September 28, 1980 (age 46)
- Place of birth: Nepal

Managerial career
- Years: Team
- 2012–2013: Three Star Club
- 2014–2020: Keystone Athletic
- 2021: Lalitpur City F.C.
- 2021–2022: Philadelphia Union (youth)
- 2022: Nepal
- 2023: Church Boys United

Pradip Humagain is an American soccer coach. He most recently served as coach of Church Boys United & Nepal national team. In 2020, Humagain gave up Nepalese citizenship to became American Citizen and switched his nationality.
