= Kamal Shrestha =

Nepalese footballer

Personal information
- Date of birth: 10 July 1997 (age 29)
- Place of birth: Nepal
- Position: Defender

Team information
- Current team: Kathmandu Rayzrs F.C.
- Number: 13

Senior career*
Years	Team	Apps	(Gls)
- Manang Marshyangdi Club

International career
2016–	Nepal	7	(0)
- * Club domestic league appearances and goals

Kamal Shrestha (Nepali: कमल श्रेष्ठ; born 10 July 1997) is a Nepalese professional footballer who plays as a defender for Kathmandu Rayzrs F.C. and the Nepal national team.

== Career ==
=== Manang Marshyangdi Club ===
Suffering an injury, one of the tribulations of being a footballer, in the 2018 2nd Far West Gold Cup quarter-final against Rupandehi XI, Shrestha was forced to miss the semifinal versus Nepal Army Club as a result and had to undergo dental surgery. Kamal is also the present captain of Manang Marsyangdi Club.
