= Birgunj United FC =

Birgunj United
- Full name: Birgunj United FC
- Founded: 4 March 2022; 4 years ago
- Ground: Narayani Stadium
- Capacity: 18,000
- Owner: Arbindra Amatya; Arbind Baral
- Head coach: Sanoj Shrestha
- League: Nepal Super League
- 2023–24: Nepal Super League, 8th of 9
Home colours	Away colours

Birgunj United Football Club is a Nepali professional franchise football club based in Parsa District. The club last competed in the Nepal Super League, the top flight of football in Nepal.

== History ==
They were announced as one of the new franchises in the second edition in 2022, coming from the Madhesh region in Nepal. Birgunj selected Deep Karki as their Marquee Player for their maiden NSL campaign. Narayani Stadium is the club's home venue.

== Players ==
=== 2023 squad ===
Note: Flags indicate national team as defined under FIFA eligibility rules; some limited exceptions apply. Players may hold more than one non-FIFA nationality.

No.	Pos.	Nation	Player
—	GK	NEP	Deep Karki
—	GK	NEP	Shatrugan Chaudary
—	DF	NEP	Simanta Thapa
—	DF	NEP	Suraj Gurung
—	DF	GHA	Aikins Kyei Baffour
—	DF	NEP	Dipenk Raj Singh
—	DF	NEP	Diwakar Chaudhary
—	MF	NEP	Suvash Gurung
—	MF	GHA	William Opoku

No.	Pos.	Nation	Player
—	CF	NEP	Sagar khadka
—	MF	NEP	Tej Tamang
—	MF	NEP	Sunil Khadka
—	DF	COD	Gustavo Tshamala Djadje
—	MF	NEP	Bhison Gurung
—	MF	NEP	Sudip Gurung
—	MF	NEP	Jaya Gurung
—	FW	GHA	Obed Yeboah
—	FW	NEP	Yubraj Khadka
—	FW	GHA	Hans Kwofie
