= Bikesh Kuthu =

Nepalese footballer (born 1993)

Personal information
- Full name: Bikesh Kuthu
- Date of birth: 24 June 1993 (age 33)
- Place of birth: Bahrabise
- Height: 1.75 m (5 ft 9 in)
- Position: Goalkeeper

Senior career*
Years	Team	Apps	(Gls)
2010	Saraswoti Youth Club		
2010–2011	Himalayan Sherpa Club		
2012	Madhyapur Youth Association		
2013–2015	Jawalakhel YC		
2015–2021	Nepal Army Club		
2021	Kathmandu Rayzrs F.C.	8	(0)
2023-24	Sporting Ilam De Mechi FC	6	(0)
2024-	Nepal Army Club	6	(0)

International career
2013	Nepal U23		
2012–	Nepal	9	(0)
Medal record
Men's football
Representing Nepal
AFC Solidarity Cup
Winner	2016 Malaysia
South Asian Games
Gold medal – first place	2016 India
Gold medal – first place	2019 Nepal
- * Club domestic league appearances and goals

Bikesh Kuthu (Nepali :बिकेश कुथु; born 24 June 1993) is a Nepalese professional footballer who plays as a goalkeeper for the Nepal national team. Kuthu made his international debut against Cameroon on August 26, 2012 in New Delhi.

== Early life ==
Bikesh Kuthu was born and raised in Sindhupalchowk District in a family of athletes. His brother Biam Kuthu is a graduate of Anfa Academy football program.

== Club career ==
Kuthu made his professional debut with Saraswoti Youth Club . He was signed later on by Himalayan Sherpa Club and then by the newly promoted Madhyapur Youth Association. He showed excellent individual performance in Ncell Cup. After relegation of Madhyapur Youth Association from A division league, Kuthu signed for Jawalakhel YC.

In 2015, Kuthu was signed by Nepal Army Club.

In 2021, Kuthu was chosen as marquee and captain of Kathmandu Rayzrs F.C., in the inaugural season of the Nepalese Franchise league Nepal Super League. He was also retained as Marquee player for 2022 season.

== International career ==
Kuthu made his international debut against Cameroon on August 26, 2012 in New Delhi.

== Career statistics ==
=== International ===
As of matches played 11 June 2022.

Appearances and goals by national team and year
National team	Year	Apps	Goals
Nepal	2012	1	0
Nepal	2015	1	0
Nepal	2016	3	0
Nepal	2017	1	0
Nepal	2018	2	0
Nepal	2019	1	0
Total		9	0

== Club honours ==
(Nepal) Kathmandu Rayzers FC

- Nepal Super League
  - Champions (1): 2021

== Individual honours ==
- Best Goalkeeper:

(Nepal) Ncell Cup : 2012

- Best Goalkeeper:

(Nepal) Bangabandhu Cup : 2016
