= Abhishek Rijal =

Nepalese footballer

Personal information
- Full name: Abhishek Rijal
- Date of birth: 29 January 2000 (age 26)
- Place of birth: Kathmandu, Nepal
- Height: 1.71 m (5 ft 7 in)
- Position: Striker

Team information
- Current team: Aizawl

Senior career*
Years	Team	Apps	(Gls)
2018–2019	Nepal Police Club		
2019	Manang Marshyangdi		
2019–2020	Machhindra	4	
2020	JJ Sports Club	3	(5)
2020	Mohammedan	4	(2)
2021–	Aizawl	3	(0)

International career^{‡}
2019–	Nepal	11	(1)
- * Club domestic league appearances and goals ‡ National team caps and goals as of 04:02, 11 June 2021 (UTC)

Abhishek Rijal (Nepali: अभिषेख रिजाल; born 29 January 2000) is a Nepali professional footballer who plays as a forward for Aizawl in the I-League and the Nepal national team.

== Club career ==
Rijal played for the Nepal Police football club. He was one of the young prospects there then he was loaned to Manang Marsyangdi and went on to scoring in AFC Cup and become the first Nepali Footballer to score in AFC Cup. With Kolkata based Mohammedan Sporting, he won the 2019–20 I-League 2nd Division tournament and helped the team qualifying for the 2020–21 I-League season. He currently plays in the I-League for Aizawl FC in India.

== International career ==
Rijal played his first match in international level against Malaysia as a substitute then he played his first match as a starter against Chinese taipei and went on to score in that match.

== Career statistics ==
=== International ===
As of 6 June 2019

Nepal national team
Year	Caps	Goals
2019	4	1
Total	4	1

=== International goals ===
Scores and results list Nepal's goal tally first.

No.	Date	Venue	Opponent	Score	Result	Competition
1.	7 June 2019	National Stadium, Kaohsiung, Taiwan	Chinese Taipei	1–1	1–1	Friendly

== Honours ==
Nepal U23

- South Asian Games: 2019

Mohammedan

- I-League 2nd Division: 2019–20

== Awards ==
- ANFA Award 2075 : Emerging player of the year
