= Deep Karki =

Nepalese footballer

Personal information
- Date of birth: 9 January 1998 (age 28)
- Place of birth: Boch, Dolakha, Nepal
- Height: 1.80 m (5 ft 11 in)
- Position: Goalkeeper

Team information
- Current team: Church Boys United
- Number: 22

Senior career*
Years	Team	Apps	(Gls)
2018–2019	Machhindra		
2019	Manang Marshyangdi	13	(0)
2021	Pokhara Thunders	6	(0)
2021–2022	Himalayan Sherpa	10	(0)
2022	Biratnagar City F.C.		
2023	Manang Marshyangdi Club		
2023–2024	Birgunj United FC	8	(0)
2024	Church Boys United	6	(0)
2025	Butwal Lumbini		
2025–	Church Boys United		

International career
2019	Nepal U23		
2022–	Nepal	4	(0)
Medal record
Representing Nepal
SAFF Championship
Runner-up	2021 Maldives
South Asian Games
Gold medal – first place	2019 Kathmandu
- * Club domestic league appearances and goals

Deep Karki (born 9 January 1998) is a Nepalese professional footballer who plays as a goalkeeper for Church Boys United and the Nepal national team.

== International career ==
Karki made his international debut against Jordan on 9 June 2022 in 2023 AFC Asian Cup qualifier, even though he had been a regular national team member since 2019.
