= Sporting Ilam De Mechi FC =

Sporting Ilam De Mechi
- Full name: Sporting Ilam De Mechi Football Club
- Founded: 4 March 2022; 3 years ago
- Ground: Mai Valley Ground
- Capacity: 10,000
- Owner: Suhang Nembang; Piyush Neupane
- Head coach: Meghraj KC
- League: Nepal Super League
- 2023–24: Nepal Super League, 9th of 9
Home colours	Away colours

Sporting Ilam De Mechi Football Club is a Nepali professional franchise football club based in Ilam Municipality. The club last competed in the Nepal Super League (NSL), the top flight of football in Nepal.

== History ==
They were announced as one of the new franchises in the NSL second edition in 2022. Sporting Ilam De Mechi FC has been one of the popular football clubs coming from the eastern Nepal. Ilam selected Bikesh Kuthu as their Marquee Player for their maiden NSL campaign. The team plays its home matches at Mai Valley Ground.

== Players ==
=== 2023 squad ===
Note: Flags indicate national team as defined under FIFA eligibility rules; some limited exceptions apply. Players may hold more than one non-FIFA nationality.

No.	Pos.	Nation	Player
—	GK	NEP	Bikesh Kuthu
—	GK	NEP	Santosh Mahat
—	GK	NEP	Samit Shrestha
—	DF	NEP	Bimal Pandey
—	DF	SEN	Abdoulaye Ba
—	DF	NEP	Ashish Gurung
—	DF	SEN	Ibrahima Djite
—	DF	NEP	Jitendra Karki
—	DF	GUI	Fode Camara
—	DF	NEP	Biraj Maharjan

No.	Pos.	Nation	Player
—	MF	NEP	Dipesh Ghale
—	MF	NEP	Aashish Rai
—	MF	NEP	Saurav Limbu
—	MF	NEP	Suroj Basnet
—	MF	NEP	Santosh Karki
—	MF	NEP	Nabin Lama
—	FW	SEN	Badou Ndiaye
—	FW	NEP	Aashish Chapagain
—	FW	NEP	Bharat Khawas
—	FW	SEN	Amath Ndaw
