= Devendra Tamang =

Nepalese footballer

Personal information
- Full name: Devendra Tamang
- Date of birth: 1 November 1993 (age 32)
- Height: 1.70 m (5 ft 7 in)
- Position: Defender

Team information
- Current team: Three Star Club

Senior career*
Years	Team	Apps	(Gls)
2014–2015	Jhapa XI		
2015–	Three Star Club		

International career
2017–	Nepal	3	(0)
- * Club domestic league appearances and goals as of 16 July 2017

Devendra Tamang (born 1 November 1993) is a Nepalese professional footballer who plays for Three Star Club and the national team.

In October 2015 at the final of 2015 Nepal National League, Tamang was awarded best defender of the season.
