= Arik Bista =

Nepalese footballer (born 2000)

Personal information
- Date of birth: 17 March 2000 (age 26)
- Place of birth: Nepal
- Height: 1.71 m (5 ft 7 in)
- Position: Midfielder

Team information
- Current team: Fortis
- Number: 31

Senior career*
Years	Team	Apps	(Gls)
2023–2024	Tribhuvan Army Club		
2019–2022	New Road Team		
2021	Lalitpur City		
2022–2023	Church Boys United		
2023–2025	Butwal Lumbini	8	(0)
2024	Shillong Lajong	9	(0)
2024	Church Boys United	0	(0)
2025–2026	Brothers Union	9	(1)
2026	Church Boys United	6	(2)
2026–	Fortis	3	(0)

International career
2016	Nepal U16		
2017	Nepal U19	6	(0)
2019–2023	Nepal U23	3	(0)
2020–	Nepal	23	(0)
- * Club domestic league appearances and goals as of 9 October 2026

Arik Bista (born 17 March 2000) is a Nepalese professional footballer who plays as a midfielder for Bangladesh Football League club Fortis and the Nepal national team.

== Club career ==
In 2022, Bista joined Nepal Super League club Pokhara Thunders.

In January 2024, he moved to India, signing with I-League side Shillong Lajong.

In 2025, he joined Brothers Union for the 2025–26 Bangladesh Football League.

== International career ==
He made his debut for the national team against Bangladesh on 13 November 2020 in Dhaka. Arik won the Martyrs Memorial A-Division League 2023 season with Church Boys
