= Kathmandu Rayzrs FC =

Kathmandu Rayzrs
- Full name: Kathmandu Rayzrs Football Club
- Nickname: The Yoddhas
- Founded: 2021; 5 years ago
- Ground: Dasarath Rangasala Stadium
- Capacity: 15,000
- Owners: Vishnu Agarwal (MAW Group Yamaha); Cabinet Shrestha; Rahul Agrawal
- Head coach: Patrick De Wilde
- League: Nepal Super League
Home colours	Away colours

Kathmandu Rayzrs Football Club is a Nepali professional franchise football club based in Kathmandu that currently competes in the Nepal Super League (NSL), the top flight of football in Nepal.

== History ==
The club was formed in March 2021 after the establishment of the Nepal Super League under the supervision of All Nepal Football Association (ANFA). The club played their first match on 24 April against Lalitpur City. They reached the final of the NSL, winning 1–0 against Dhangadhi, to claim the inaugural league title.

In the second season, the club finished in the top four and qualified for the playoffs. They were beaten in the Eliminator round of the playoffs and finished fourth.

== Identity ==
The club's primary colors are blue and white. Its badge features an eagle that embodies the club's aggressive spirit, while the hill and stupa pay homage to Kathmandu’s heritage. The color scheme mirrors Nepal's flag. The fan group is known as Yoddhas. The club represents the capital city of Nepal, hence the tagline is #Rajdhanikosaan.

== Personnel ==
Role	Name
Owners	Vishnu Agarwal; Cabinet Shrestha; Rahul Agrawal
CEO	Piyush Neupane
Team manager	Utsav Shakya
Head coach	Patrick De Wilde
Assistant coach	Meghraj KC
Analyst	Nicky Lelievre
Physiotherapist	Sajan Upadhayay
Kit manager	Bibek Timalsina
Operations coordinator	Pujan Thapa

== Players ==
As of 3 April 2025

Note: Flags indicate national team as defined under FIFA eligibility rules; some limited exceptions apply. Players may hold more than one non-FIFA nationality.

No.	Pos.	Nation	Player
3	MF	SEN	Bakary Mane
4	DF	UZB	Alizhon Alizhonov
5	DF	NEP	Kuldip Karki (Captain)
6	DF	NEP	Puskar Khadka
7	FW	NEP	Gillespye Jung Karki
8	MF	NEP	Dipesh Gurung
9	FW	NEP	Ashish Chapagain
10	FW	NEP	Previous Sunuwar
11	FW	SEN	Amadou Macky Diop
12	MF	NEP	Pemba Dorje Lama
13	DF	NEP	Kamal Shrestha

No.	Pos.	Nation	Player
14	DF	NEP	Sandesh Khatri
15	MF	NEP	Dinesh Henjan
16	GK	SEN	Cheikh Gueye
20	MF	FRA	Vincent Koziello
21	GK	NEP	Mausam Lungeli Magar
23	DF	NEP	Diwakar Chaudhary
26	DF	NEP	Anjal Maharjan
27	GK	NEP	Abhishek Baral
32	MF	NEP	Rohan Karki (Marquee)
33	DF	NEP	Bharat Chaudhary
77	FW	SLE	Mohamed Buya Turay

== Coaching history ==
Head coach	Year
(Nepal) Bal Gopal Maharjan	2021, 2023
(Belgium) Patrick De Wilde	2025

== Sponsors ==
Year	Title sponsor	Co-sponsor	Associate sponsors	Insurance sponsor	Footwear sponsor	Transportation sponsor	Kits partner	Hospitality partner	Media partner
2025	MAW Group Yamaha	Mahindra & Mahindra	Arghakhachi Cement; HP Lubricants	Salico Insurance	Fitrite Shoes	Eicher Motors	Hummel International	Dusit International	Trexmin Studios

== Honours ==
- Nepal Super League
  - Champions (1): 2021
