= Dhangadhi FC =

Association football club

Dhangadhi
- Full name: Dhangadhi Football Club
- Founded: 2021; 4 years ago
- Ground: Dhangadhi Stadium
- Capacity: 10,000
- Owner: Go Dreamers Pvt. Ltd.
- President: Subash Shahi
- Head coach: Juan Manuel Saez
- League: Nepal Super League
Home colours	Away colours

Dhangadhi Football Club is a Nepali professional franchise football club based in Dhangadhi, Sudurpashchim Province, that plays in the Nepal Super League (NSL), the top flight league in Nepal.

In the first season, the club ended the tournament as runners-up, after losing to Kathmandu Rayzers in the final. The club reached another final in the second NSL edition, which they lost as well, this time to Lalitpur City F.C.

== History ==
The club was one of the seven teams to participate in the inaugural NSL season. The name, logo and owner of the club were introduced on 14 March 2021.
