= Dasharath Rangasala =

Multi-purpose stadium in Kathmandu, Nepal

Dashrath Rangasala
- दशरथ रंगशाला
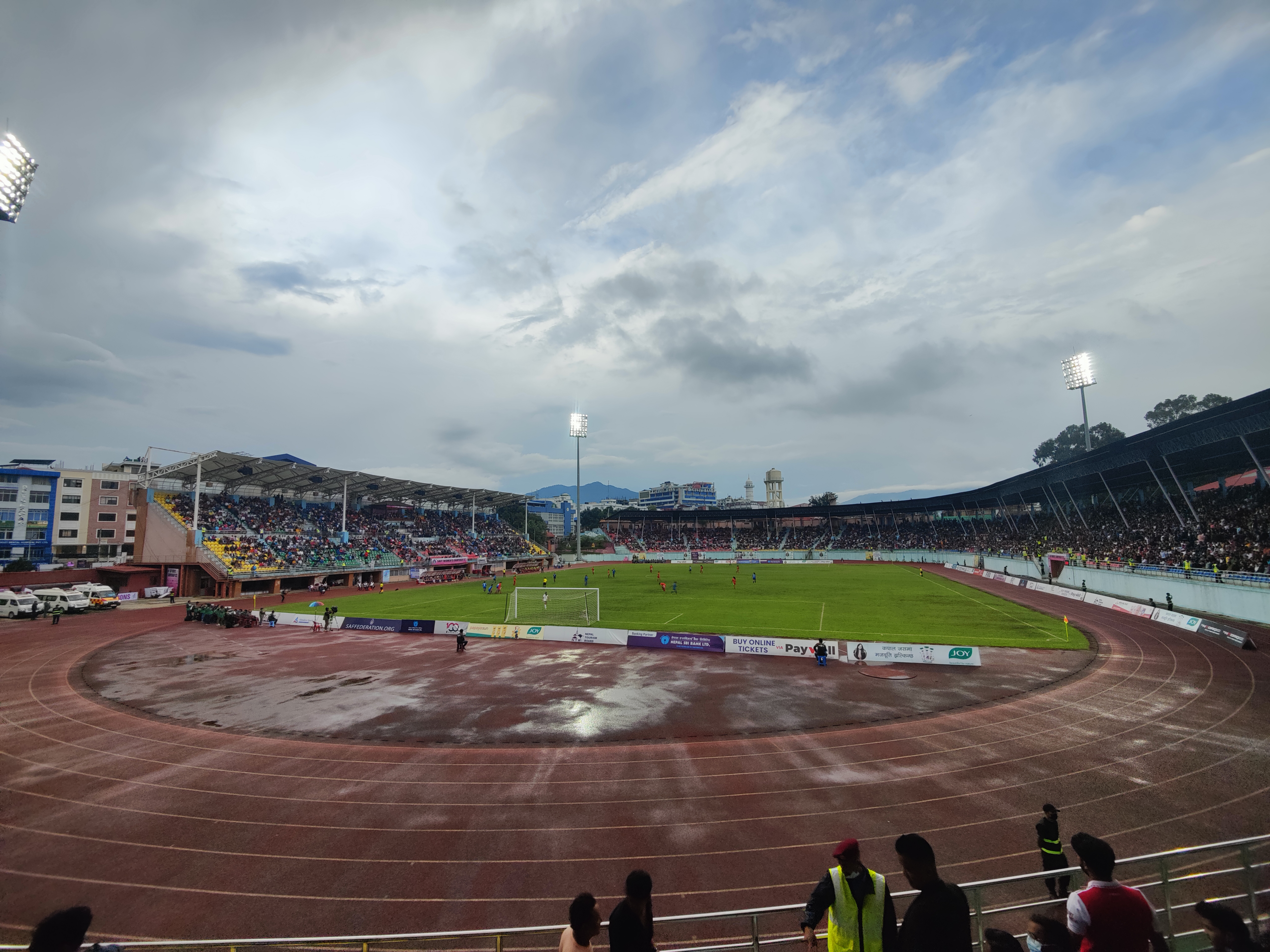
- The stadium during the 2022 SAFF Women's Championship Final
- Interactive map of Dashrath Rangasala
- Location: Tripureshwor, Kathmandu, Nepal
- Coordinates: 27°41′42″N 85°18′53″E
- Elevation: 1,299 m (4,262 ft)
- Owner: Government of Nepal
- Operator: National Sports Council Nepal
- Capacity: 13,000
- Surface: Grass
- Record attendance: 15,000

Construction
- Built: 1956
- Opened: 1958
- Renovated: 2019

Tenants
- Nepal national football team Martyrs Memorial A-Division League (Kathmandu clubs); National Women's League (Kathmandu clubs); Nepal Super League

Dasharath Rangasala (Nepali: दशरथ रङ्गशाला ; transl. Dasharath Stadium) is a multi-purpose stadium in Tripureshwar, Kathmandu. It is named after Dasharath Chand, one of the four great martyrs of Nepal.

The stadium is used mostly for football matches and cultural programmes. The stadium has also been the only host of the inaugural 2021 Nepal Super League season.

== History ==
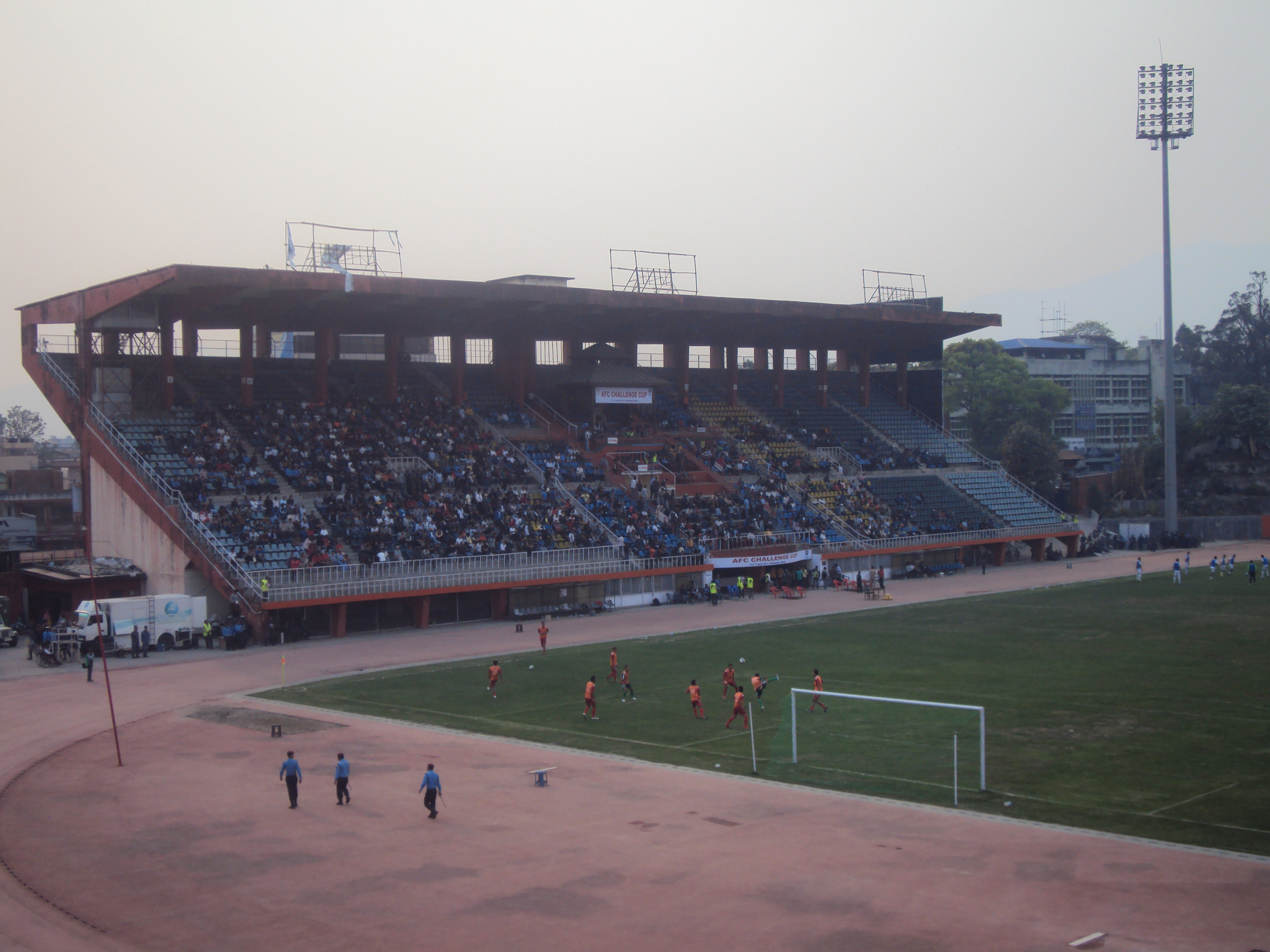
The main stand of the stadium in 2011

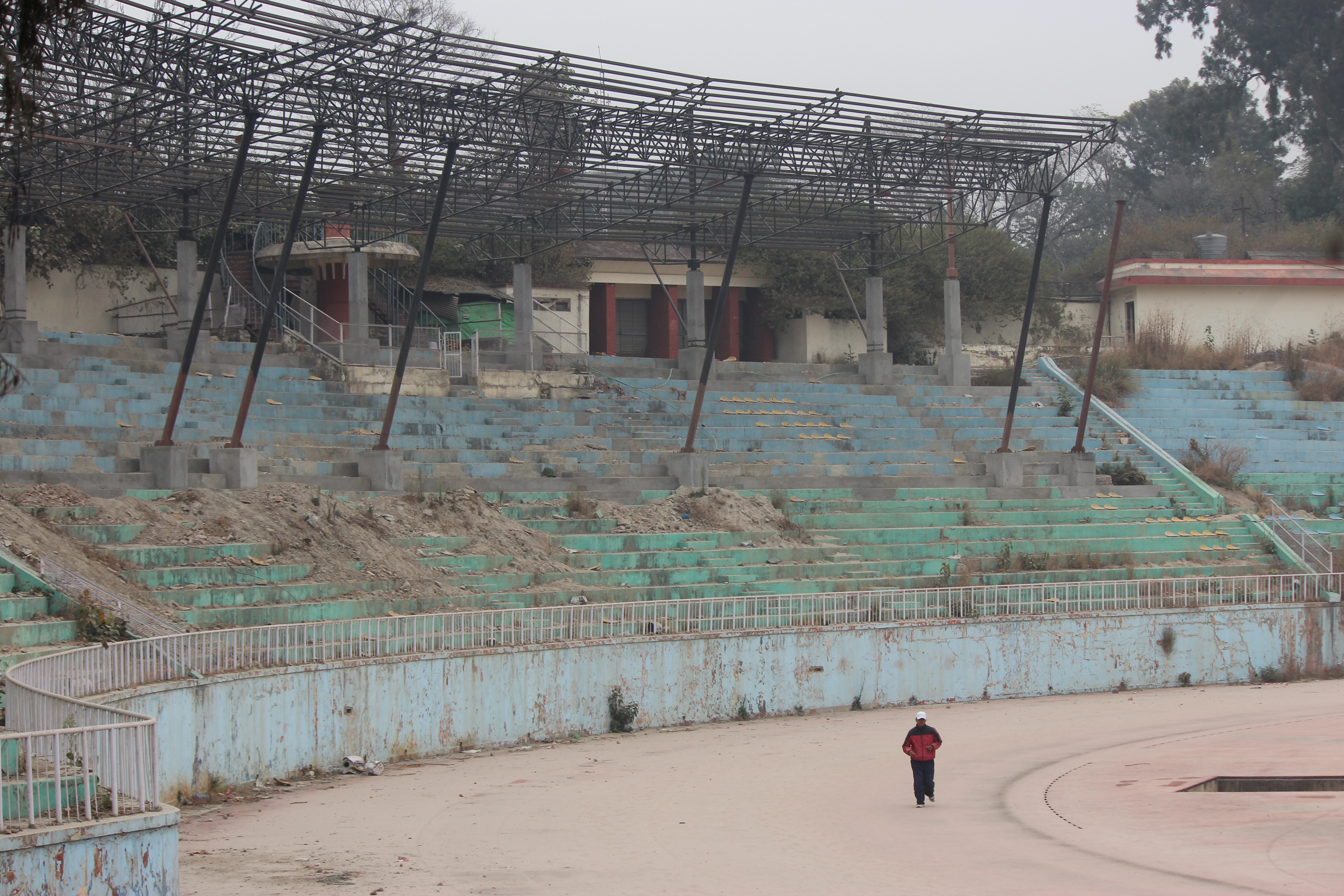
The earthquake-damaged stadium in 2018

The stadium was built in 1956, at a site which previously was a large lotus pond.

On 13 March 1988, the 1988 Kathmandu stadium disaster occurred. About 30,000 people were present in the stadium to watch a match between two clubs from Nepal and Bangladesh when a hailstorm broke out, causing a stampede as the spectators rushed to locked exits to escape the hailstorm. According to reports, at least 93 people died in the stampede, including two police officers and a 12-year-old child. More than 100 people were hospitalized with injuries. It was considered one of the most catastrophic events in the history of sports.

The stadium was renovated in 1998 to host the 1999 South Asian Games. In 2011, it was renovated again to host the 2012 AFC Challenge Cup.

As Nepal's biggest stadium, it has hosted many important events. The 2012 AFC Challenge Cup and the 2013 SAFF Championship were held here, with the Halchowk Stadium hosting some of the matches as well. Numerous cultural festivals and musical events have also taken place here. The 2011 concert of Bryan Adams, the first held in Nepal by an international singer, was held in this stadium.

The stadium suffered damage in the April 2015 Nepal earthquake.

After the earthquake, the stadium was renovated for the third time and the opening was done again on 1 December 2019 for the 2019 South Asian Games. In March 2024, the Nepalese national team were forced to move their upcoming home games to the Middle East as the stadium had failed to meet FIFA standards.

In February 2024, the Asian Football Confederation (AFC) declared that the stadium no longer met the standards required to host matches in AFC or FIFA competitions. As a result, Nepal's "home" fixtures against Bahrain and the United Arab Emirates in the 2026 World Cup qualification second round were played in the opponents' countries in March and June 2024. The team's last international match at the stadium was against Yemen on 21 November 2023.

The AFC's concerns reportedly included the floodlights, pitch drainage, entrances and exits, and seat markings, as well as the stadium's safety report. The stadium had previously been ruled unfit to host an international match in 2019, when Nepal was unable to host Kuwait in a joint qualifier for the 2022 World Cup and 2023 Asian Cup. According to the Post, the AFC did not lift the suspension after a further inspection in August 2025, and the general secretary of the All Nepal Football Association, Kiran Rai, said a major renovation would be needed for the stadium to host AFC and FIFA tournaments again. The stadium continued to host other events, including the SAFF Women's Championship in October 2024.

== Major sports events ==
- 1997 SAFF Football Championship (4 – 13 September 1997)
- 1999 South Asian Games
- 2012 AFC Challenge Cup (8 – 19 March 2012)
- 2013 SAFF U-16 Championship (20 – 30 July 2013)
- 2013 SAFF Championship (31 August – 11 September 2013)
- 2019 South Asian Games (1 – 10 December 2019)
- 2022 SAFF Women's Championship (6 – 19 September 2022)
- 2024 SAFF Women's Championship (17 – 30 October 2024)
- 2025 SAFF Women's Club Championship (5 – 20 December 2025)

== Major music and cultural events ==
- Godiego - live in concert (1980)
- Bryan Adams – live in concert by JPR events (19 February 2011)
- Atif Aslam – live in concert (2013)

== See also ==
- All Nepal Football Association
- Nepal national football team
- Nepal women's national football team
- Nepal national under-17 football team
- Nepal national under-20 football team
- Nepal Super League
- List of football stadiums in Nepal
