= Butwal Lumbini F.C. =

Association football club

Butwal Lumbini
- Full name: Butwal Lumbini Football Club
- Nickname: The Monks
- Founded: 2021; 4 years ago
- Ground: ANFA Technical Centre
- Capacity: 5,000
- League: Nepal Super League
- Website: fcbutwallumbini.com
Home colours	Away colours

Butwal Lumbini Football Club is a Nepali professional franchise football club based in Butwal, Lumbini Province, that plays in the Nepal Super League (NSL), the top flight football league in Nepal.

In the NSL's first season, the team finished fourth in the league table, and were eliminated by Lalitpur City in the eliminator. The club finished 6th in second NSL season.

== History ==
The club was formed in March 2021 after the establishment of Nepal Super League, the first-ever franchise football league in Nepal, under the supervision of All Nepal Football Association (ANFA). The club played its first match on 25 April 2021 against Pokhara Thunders.

== Team position by season ==
- NSL, 2021: 4th
