= Nepal Super League =

Professional football league in Nepal

- Organising bodies: Nepal Sports and Events Management; ANFA
- Founded: February 21, 2021; 5 years ago
- Country: Nepal
- Confederation: AFC
- Number of clubs: 7
- Level on pyramid: 1
- Current champions: Lalitpur City (2nd title) (2025)
- Most championships: Lalitpur City (2 title)
- Most appearances: Ayush Ghalan (24)
- Broadcaster(s): Himalaya TV
- Website: nepalsuperleague.com

The Nepal Super League (Nepali: नेपाल सुपर लिग), simply known as the NSL, is Nepal's first professional franchise club football league organised by the Nepal Sports and Events Management (NSEM) with technical support of the ANFA.

Seven franchises participated in the first edition of the tournament, which was held at Dasharath Rangasala Stadium from 24 April to 15 May 2021.

== Teams ==
=== Current ===
Team	Location
Kathmandu Rayzrs	Kathmandu, Bagmati Province
Lalitpur City FC	Lalitpur, Bagmati Province
FC Chitwan	Bharatpur, Bagmati Province
Pokhara Thunders	Pokhara, Gandaki Province
Butwal Lumbini	Butwal, Lumbini Province
Dhangadhi FC	Dhangadhi, Sudurpashchim Province
Jhapa FC	Jhapa, Koshi Province

=== Former ===
Team	Location
Birgunj United FC	Birgunj, Madhesh Province
Sporting Ilam De Mechi FC	Ilam, Koshi Province
Biratnagar City FC	Biratnagar, Koshi Province

Earlier editions of the league were played at a single venue. In May 2026, the organiser, Nepal Sports and Event Management, announced that the fourth season would instead be played in a home-and-away format, with a scheduled start date of 5 September 2026. The league was also expected to expand from seven to 10–12 teams and to run over about four months, compared with about a month in the first three seasons. The Kathmandu Post reported that there had been little disclosure about whether international-standard grounds would be available in the cities the teams represent.

== Stadium ==
All matches were played at the Dasarath Rangasala stadium in Kathmandu.

Dhangadhi	Butwal	Pokhara	Kathmandu	Biratnagar
Dhangadi Stadium	ANFA Technical Centre	Pokhara Rangasala	Dasarath Rangasala	Sahid Rangsala
Capacity: 10,000	Capacity: 5,000	Capacity: 16,500	Capacity: 15,000	Capacity: 15,000
Team: Dhangadhi	Team: Butwal Lumbini	Team: Pokhara Thunders	Team: Kathmandu Rayzrs	Team:Biratnagar City

Birgunj	Lalitpur	Ilam	Jhapa	Chitwan
Narayani Stadium	Chyasal Stadium	Mai Valley Ground	Domalal Rajbanshi Ground	Krishnapur Sports Stadium
Capacity: 15,000	Capacity: 10,000	Capacity: 5,000	Capacity: 2,000	Capacity: -
Team: Birgunj United	Team: Lalitpur City	Team: Sporting Ilam De Mechi	Team: Jhapa	Team: FC Chitwan
				-

== Winners ==
Edition	Season	Winner	Runners–up	Third place	Top scorer
1st	2021	Kathmandu Rayzrs	Dhangadhi FC	Lalitpur City	
2nd	2023	Lalitpur City	Dhangadhi FC	Pokhara Thunders	
3rd	2025	Lalitpur City	Pokhara Thunders	Dhangadhi FC	

== Performance by teams ==
Team	Titles	Runners–up	Winning seasons	Runners–up seasons
Lalitpur City	2	—N/a	2023, 2025	—N/a
Kathmandu Rayzrs	1	—N/a	2021	—N/a
Dhangadhi FC	—N/a	2	—N/a	2021, 2023
Pokhara Thunders	—N/a	1	—N/a	2025

== See also ==
- Nepal National League
- Martyr's Memorial A-Division League
- Football in Nepal
