= 2025 Nepal Super League =

Second season of Nepal Super League

Nepal Super League
- Season: 2025
- Dates: 29 March – 26 April 2025
- Champions: Lalitpur City (2nd title)
- Runners-up: Pokhara Thunders
- Matches: 25
- Goals: 54 (2.16 per match)
- Best Player: (Nepal) Ayush Ghalan
- Top goalscorer: (Lebanon) Ahmad Hijazi (5 goals)
- Best goalkeeper: (Cameroon) Yves Priso (5 Clean sheets)
- Biggest win: Butwal 1–4 Dhangadhi (1 April 2025)
- Highest scoring: Butwal 1–4 Dhangadhi (1 April 2025); Lalitpur 1–4 Pokhara (2 April 2025)
- Longest winning run: Lalitpur City (8 matches)
- Longest unbeaten run: Lalitpur City (8 matches)
- Longest winless run: Jhapa; Butwal (6 matches)
- Longest losing run: Jhapa; Butwal (6 matches)

The 2025 Nepal Super League (also known as Ncell Nepal Super League 2025 for sponsorship reasons) is the third season of the Nepal Super League, the top flight franchise club football league of Nepal.

Sporting Ilam and Birgunj United, both entering the NSL last season, have opted out of participation.

== Venue ==
All matches were played at the Dasharath Stadium in Kathmandu.

Kathmandu	2025 Nepal Super League is located in Nepal
Dasharath Stadium	2025 Nepal Super League is located in Nepal
Capacity: 15,000	2025 Nepal Super League is located in Nepal

== Teams ==
Locations of the NSL teams

Team	City	Province	Stadium	Capacity
Kathmandu Rayzrs	Kathmandu	Bagmati	Dasharath Stadium	18,500
Lalitpur City	Lalitpur	Bagmati	Chyasal Stadium	10,000
FC Chitwan	Bharatpur	Bagmati	Krishnapur Sports Stadium	3,500
Pokhara Thunders	Pokhara	Gandaki	Pokhara Stadium	16,500
Butwal Lumbini	Butwal	Lumbini	ANFA Technical Centre	5,000
Dhangadhi FC	Dhangadhi	Sudurpashchim	Dhangadi Stadium	10,000
Jhapa FC	Jhapa	Koshi	Domalal Rajbanshi Ground	5,000

== Personnel and sponsorship ==
Team	Head coach	Captain	Marquee player	Kit manufacturer	Shirt sponsor
Kathmandu Rayzrs	(Belgium) Patrick De Wilde	(Nepal) Kuldip Karki	(Nepal) Rohan Karki	(Germany) Hummel	Yamaha
Lalitpur City	(England) Simon Grayson	(Nepal) Ananta Tamang	(Nepal) Ananta Tamang	(India) T10 Sports	Prabhu Bank
FC Chitwan	(Nepal) Nabin Neaupane	(Nepal) Anjan Bista	(Nepal) Anjan Bista	Ather	IME Group
Pokhara Thunders	(Nepal) Suman Shrestha	(Nepal) Nawayug Shrestha	(Nepal) Samir Tamang	(Nepal) G-Sports	Shikhar Insurance
Butwal Lumbini	(Bhutan) Puspalal Sharma	(Nepal) Arik Bista	(Nepal) Manish Dangi	In-house	CURRENT
Dhangadhi FC	(Spain) Juan Manuel Saez	(Nepal) Devendra Tamang	(Nepal) Kritish Ratna Chhunju	(India) T10 Sports	My Second Teacher
Jhapa FC	(Nepal) Prabesh Katuwal	(Nepal) Laken Limbu	(Nepal) Laken Limbu	(Nepal) G-Sports	Himalayan Bank

== Foreign players ==
Each team can recruit six foreign players and field five at a time.

Team	Player 1	Player 2	Player 3	Player 4	Player 5	Player 6
Butwal Lumbini	(Nigeria) Ezekiel Tamara	(England) Nathan Mavila	(Scotland) Frank Ross	(Japan) Kenta Hara	(England) Adam Mitter	(Ghana) Philip Adjah
FC Chitwan	(Uzbekistan) Nodirbek Mavlonov	(United States) Jonathan Campbell	(Jamaica) Amal Knight	(United States) Victor Mansaray	(Nigeria) Malik Yusif	(Ghana) Torric Jebrin
Dhangadhi FC	(Nigeria) Afeez Olawale Oladipo	(Morocco) Mohamed El Jaaouani	(Spain) Walid Birrou	(Brazil) Sérgio Barboza	(Colombia) Jorge Caceido	(Lebanon) Ahmad Hijazi
Jhapa FC	(Serbia) Lazar Arsić	(Uzbekistan) Muhammad Isaev	(Uzbekistan) Azamat Abdullaev	(Montenegro) Nemanja Lemajić	(Nigeria) Alhaji Gero	—N/a
Kathmandu Rayzrs	(Sierra Leone) Mohamed Buya Turay	(France) Vincent Koziello	(Senegal) Bakary Mané	(Uzbekistan) Alijon Alijonov	(Senegal) Cheikh Gueye	(Senegal) Amadou Macky Diop
Lalitpur City	(France) Jeffrey Baltus	(Haiti) Kervens Belfort	(Nigeria) Imoh Ezekiel	(Palestine) Jonathan Cantillana	(Senegal) Papé Diakité	(France) Papa Ibou Kébé
Pokhara Thunders	(Cameroon) Stephane Binong	(Nigeria) Michael Ijezie	(Cameroon) Biassi Nyakwe	(Uzbekistan) Saiddoston Djafarov	(Cameroon) Yves Priso	(Ghana) Joe Aidoo

== Regular season ==
=== League table ===
Pos	Team	Pld	W	D	L	GF	GA	GD	Pts	Qualification
1	Lalitpur City (C)	6	3	3	0	10	8	+2	12	Advance to Playoffs
2	Dhangadhi FC (3rd)	6	3	2	1	9	5	+4	11	Advance to Playoffs
3	FC Chitwan (4th)	6	3	1	2	8	6	+2	10	Advance to Playoffs
4	Pokhara Thunders (Ru)	6	2	2	2	7	6	+1	8	Advance to Playoffs
5	Kathmandu Rayzrs	6	2	2	2	6	7	−1	8	
6	Jhapa FC	6	0	5	1	3	4	−1	5	
7	Butwal Lumbini	6	0	1	5	1	10	−9	1	

NSL
HamroKhelkud
Sofa Score
Rules for classification: 1) points; 2) head-to-head goal difference; 3) head-to-head points; 4) goal difference; 5) number of goals scored; 6) play-off match

=== Results by games ===
Team ╲ Round	1	2	3	4	5	6
Butwal Lumbini	D	L	L	L	L	L
FC Chitwan	W	W	D	L	L	W
Dhangadhi FC	W	D	D	W	W	L
Jhapa FC	D	D	D	D	L	D
Kathmandu Rayzrs	D	D	L	W	L	W
Lalitpur City	D	W	D	W	W	D
Pokhara Thunders	L	L	W	D	D	W

NSL
HamroKhelkud
Sofa Score
W = Win; D = Draw; L = Lose

=== Head-to-head scores ===
Home \ Away	Lalitpur	Dhangadhi	Chitwan	Jhapa	Kathmandu	Butwal	Pokhara
Lalitpur City		0–0	2–1	1–1	2–2	2–0	3–2
Dhangadhi FC	0–0		1–3	1–0	3–1	4–1	0–0
FC Chitwan	1–2	3–1		1–1	0–2	1–0	2–0
Jhapa FC	1–1	0–1	1–1		0–0	0–0	1–1
Kathmandu Rayzrs	2–2	1–3	2–0	0–0		1–0	0–2
Butwal Lumbini	0–2	1–4	0–1	0–0	0–1		0–2
Pokhara Thunders	2–3	0–0	0–2	1–1	2–0	2–0	

NSL
HamroKhelkud
Sofa Score
Legend: Blue = home team win; Yellow = draw; Red = away team win.

== League stage matches ==
=== Results summary ===
Matchday 1
Team 1	Score	Team 2
Lalitpur City	2–2	Kathmandu Rayzrs
Butwal Lumbini	0–0	Jhapa FC
FC Chitwan	2–0	Pokhara Thunders

Matchday 2
Team 1	Score	Team 2
Butwal Lumbini	1–4	Dhangadhi FC
Lalitpur City	3–2	Pokhara Thunders
Jhapa FC	0–0	Kathmandu Rayzrs

Matchday 3
Team 1	Score	Team 2
FC Chitwan	1–0	Butwal Lumbini
Pokhara Thunders	2–0	Kathmandu Rayzrs
Dhangadhi FC	0–0	Lalitpur City

Matchday 4
Team 1	Score	Team 2
Jhapa FC	1–1	FC Chitwan
Kathmandu Rayzrs	1–0	Butwal Lumbini
Pokhara Thunders	0–0	Dhangadhi FC

Matchday 5
Team 1	Score	Team 2
FC Chitwan	1–2	Lalitpur City
Kathmandu Rayzrs	1–3	Dhangadhi FC
Jhapa FC	1–1	Pokhara Thunders

Matchday 6
Team 1	Score	Team 2
Butwal Lumbini	0–2	Lalitpur City
Kathmandu Rayzrs	2–0	FC Chitwan
Dhangadhi FC	1–0	Jhapa FC

Matchday 7
Team 1	Score	Team 2
Pokhara Thunders	2–0	Butwal Lumbini
Lalitpur City	1–1	Jhapa FC
Dhangadhi FC	1–3	FC Chitwan

=== Matches ===
League stage matches
- Times listed are UTC+5:45.

==== Matchday 1 ====
29 March 2025 Match 1	Lalitpur City	2–2	Kathmandu Rayzrs	Kathmandu
18:15 NST	Kamal 5' (o.g.); Aditya Shakya 15'	Hamro Khelkud; NSL	Amadou 75'; Koziello 90+5' (pen.)	Stadium: Dasharath Stadium; Referee: Umesh Bidari; Man of the Match: Vincent Koziello (Kathmandu Rayzrs)

30 March 2025 Match 2	Butwal Lumbini	0–0	Jhapa	Kathmandu
18:15 NST		Hamro Khelkud; NSL		Stadium: Dasharath Stadium; Attendance: 1,400; Referee: Nabindra Maharjan; Man of the Match: Deep Karki (Butwal Lumbini)

31 March 2025 Match 3	Chitwan	2–0	Pokhara Thunders	Kathmandu
18:15 NST	Nodirbek 15'; Niraj Chaudhary 90+5'	Hamro Khelkud; NSL		Stadium: Dasharath Stadium; Attendance: 2,710; Referee: Shyam Danuwar; Man of the Match: Nodirbek Mavlonov (Chitwan)

==== Matchday 2 ====
1 April 2025 Match 4	Butwal Lumbini	1–4	Dhangadhi	Kathmandu
18:15 NST	Kenta Hara 32'	Hamro Khelkud; NSL	Hijazi 6', 90+5'; Krittish Chhunju 75'; Barboza 90+9'	Stadium: Dasharath Stadium; Attendance: 2,800; Referee: Prajwol Chhetri; Man of the Match: Ahmad Hijazi (Dhangadhi)

2 April 2025 Match 5	Lalitpur City	3–2	Pokhara Thunders	Kathmandu
18:15 NST	Cantillana 11', 75'; Ezekiel 45+2'	Hamro Khelkud; NSL	Samir 42'; Aidoo 90+11'	Stadium: Dasharath Stadium; Referee: Nabindra Maharjan; Man of the Match: Jonathan Cantillana (Lalitpur City)

3 April 2025 Match 6	Jhapa	0–0	Kathmandu Rayzrs	Kathmandu
18:15 NST		Hamro Khelkud; NSL		Stadium: Dasharath Stadium; Referee: Prajwol Chhetri; Man of the Match: Abishek Baral (Kathmandu Rayzrs)

==== Matchday 3 ====
4 April 2025 Match 7	Chitwan	1–0	Butwal Lumbini	Kathmandu
18:15 NST	Jebrin 90+2'	Hamro Khelkud; NSL		Stadium: Dasharath Stadium; Referee: Umesh Bidari; Man of the Match: Torric Jebrin (Chitwan)

5 April 2025 Match 8	Pokhara Thunders	2–0	Kathmandu Rayzrs	Kathmandu
14:45 NST	Binong 25'; Sudil Rai 58'	Hamro Khelkud; NSL		Stadium: Dasharath Stadium; Attendance: 3,850; Referee: Shyam Danuwar; Man of the Match: Stephane Binong (Pokhara Thunders)

5 April 2025 Match 9	Dhangadhi	0–0	Lalitpur City	Kathmandu
18:15 NST		Hamro Khelkud; NSL		Stadium: Dasharath Stadium; Referee: Prajwol Chhetri; Man of the Match: Sanish Shrestha (Lalitpur City)

==== Matchday 4 ====
6 April 2025 Match 10	Jhapa	1–1	Chitwan	Kathmandu
18:15 NST	Gero 90+4' (pen.)	Hamro Khelkud; NSL	Jebrin 28'	Stadium: Dasharath Stadium; Attendance: 3,787; Referee: Kabin Byanjankar; Man of the Match: Torric Jebrin (Chitwan)

8 April 2025 Match 11	Kathmandu Rayzrs	1–0	Butwal Lumbini	Kathmandu
18:15 NST	Amadou 88'	Hamro Khelkud; NSL		Stadium: Dasharath Stadium; Attendance: 3,174; Referee: Prajwol Chhetri; Man of the Match: Amadou Macky Diop (Kathmandu Rayzrs)

9 April 2025 Match 12	Pokhara Thunders	0–0	Dhangadhi	Kathmandu
18:15 NST		Hamro Khelkud; NSL		Stadium: Dasharath Stadium; Attendance: 3,730; Referee: Umesh Bidari; Man of the Match: Sérgio Barboza (Dhangadhi)

==== Matchday 5 ====
10 April 2025 Match 13	Chitwan	1–2	Lalitpur City	Kathmandu
18:15 NST	Mansaray 75'	Hamro Khelkud; NSL	Ezekiel 3'; Mani 80'	Stadium: Dasharath Stadium; Attendance: 4,200; Referee: Shyam Danuwar; Man of the Match: Mani Kumar Lama (Lalitpur City)

11 April 2025 Match 14	Kathmandu Rayzrs	1–3	Dhangadhi	Kathmandu
16:15 NST	Amadou 21'	Hamro Khelkud; NSL	Hijazi 35', 41', 45+2'	Stadium: Dasharath Stadium; Attendance: 2,975; Referee: Prajwol Chhetri; Man of the Match: Ahmad Hijazi (Dhangadhi)

12 April 2025 Match 15	Jhapa	1–1	Pokhara Thunders	Kathmandu
14:45 NST	Arsić 65'	Hamro Khelkud; NSL	Binong 52'	Stadium: Dasharath Stadium; Attendance: 4,299; Referee: Umesh Bidari; Man of the Match: Stephane Binong (Pokhara Thunders)

==== Matchday 6 ====
12 April 2025 Match 16	Butwal Lumbini	0–2	Lalitpur City	Kathmandu
18:15 NST		Hamro Khelkud; NSL	Ananta 23'; Santosh Khatri 88'	Stadium: Dasharath Stadium; Attendance: 4,378; Referee: Shyam Danuwar; Man of the Match: Ananta Tamang (Lalitpur City)

14 April 2025 Match 17	Kathmandu Rayzrs	2–0	Chitwan	Kathmandu
14:45 NST	Bakary 31'; Amadou 71'	Hamro Khelkud; NSL		Stadium: Dasharath Stadium; Attendance: 4,100; Referee: Prajwol Chhetri; Man of the Match: Bakary Mané (Kathmandu Rayzrs)

14 April 2025 Match 18	Dhangadhi	1–0	Jhapa	Kathmandu
18:15 NST	Dipesh Dhimal 61' (o.g.)	Hamro Khelkud; NSL		Stadium: Dasharath Stadium; Attendance: 6,545; Referee: Nabindra Maharjan; Man of the Match: Walid Birrou (Dhangadhi)

==== Matchday 7 ====
15 April 2025 Match 19	Pokhara Thunders	2–0	Butwal Lumbini	Kathmandu
18:15 NST	Ayush 10'; Biassi 59'	Hamro Khelkud; NSL		Stadium: Dasharath Stadium; Attendance: 2,350; Referee: Shyam Danuwar; Man of the Match: Ayush Ghalan; Pokhara Thunders

16 April 2025 Match 20	Lalitpur City	1–1	Jhapa	Kathmandu
18:15 NST	Nabin Lama 54'	Hamro Khelkud; NSL	Limbu 65'	Stadium: Dasharath Stadium; Referee: Umesh Bidari; Man of the Match: Laken Limbu (Jhapa)

17 April 2025 Match 21	Dhangadhi	1–3	Chitwan	Kathmandu
18:15 NST	G.P. Karki 6'	Hamro Khelkud; NSL	Nodirbek 14' (pen.); Jaya Gurung 45+2'; Amrit Shrestha 50' (o.g.)	Stadium: Dasharath Stadium; Attendance: 5,725; Referee: Prajwol Chhetri; Man of the Match: Nodirbek Mavlonov (Chitwan)

== Playoffs ==
- Times listed are UTC+5:45.

=== Bracket ===
Qualifier 1
19 April 2025 – Kathmandu
1	Lalitpur City	2
2	Dhangadhi	1
Eliminator
20 April 2025 – Kathmandu
3	Chitwan	0
4	Pokhara Thunders	3

Qualifier 2
23 April 2025 – Kathmandu
2	Dhangadhi	0
4	Pokhara Thunders	1

Final
26 April 2025 – Kathmandu
1	Lalitpur City	2
4	Pokhara Thunders	1

=== Preliminary ===
19 April 2025 Qualifier 1 (Match 22)	Lalitpur City	2–1	Dhangadhi	Kathmandu
18:15 NST	Belfort 56'; Ibou 79'	Hamro Khelkud; NSL	G.P. Karki 61'	Stadium: Dasharath Stadium; Attendance: 6,850; Referee: Umesh Bidari; Man of the Match: Kervens Belfort (Lalitpur City)

20 April 2025 Eliminator (Match 23)	Chitwan	0–3	Pokhara Thunders	Kathmandu
18:15 NST		Hamro Khelkud; NSL	Abhishek Limbu 63' (o.g.); Aidoo 72', 75'	Stadium: Dasharath Stadium; Referee: Prajwol Chhetri; Man of the Match: Joe Aidoo; Pokhara Thunders

23 April 2025 Qualifier 2 (Match 24)	Dhangadhi	0–1	Pokhara Thunders	Kathmandu
18:15 NST		Hamro Khelkud; NSL	Binong 90+3'	Stadium: Dasharath Stadium; Referee: Prajwol Chhetri; Man of the Match: Stephane Binong; Pokhara Thunders

=== Final ===
26 April 2025 Final (Match 25)	Lalitpur City	2–1	Pokhara Thunders	Kathmandu
18:15 NST	Ezekiel 41'; Ibou 73'	Hamro Khelkud; NSL	Sudil Rai 62'	Stadium: Dasharath Stadium; Referee: K Ramdasan; Man of the Match: Imoh Ezekiel (Lalitpur City)

== Awards ==
Award	Winner	Team	Prize
Emerging Player	(Nepal) Santosh Khatri	Lalitpur City	रु 1,00,000 + Trophy
Energetic Player	(Nepal) Mani Kumar Lama	Lalitpur City	रु 1,00,000
Best goalkeeper	(Cameroon) Yves Priso	Pokhara Thunders	रु 1,50,000 + Trophy
Top scorer	(Lebanon) Ahmad Hijazi	Dhangadhi	रु 1,50,000 + Trophy
Player of the tournament	(Nepal) Ayush Ghalan	Pokhara Thunder	रु 2,50,000 + Trophy
Fairplay Award	Jhapa FC		Trophy
Runners-up	Pokhara Thunders		रु 30,00,000
Champions	Lalitpur City		रु 80,00,000 + Trophy

== Season statistics ==
=== Goalscorers ===
There have been 54 goals scored in 25 matches, for an average of 2.16 goals per match.

5 goals

- (Lebanon) Ahmad Hijazi (Dhangadhi)

4 goals

- (Senegal) Amadou Macky Diop (Kathmandu Rayzrs)

3 goals

- (Cameroon) Stephane Binong (Pokhara Thunders)
- (Nigeria) Imoh Ezekiel (Lalitpur City)

2 goals

- (Palestine) Jonathan Cantillana (Lalitpur City)
- (France) Papa Ibou Kébé (Lalitpur City)
- (Nepal) George Prince Karki (Dhangadhi)
- (Ghana) Torric Jebrin (Chitwan)
- (Uzbekistan) Nodirbek Mavlonov (Chitwan)
- (Ghana) Joe Aidoo (Pokhara Thunders)
- (Nepal) Sudil Rai (Pokhara Thunders)

1 goal

- (Japan) Kenta Hara (Butwal Lumbini)
- (Nigeria) Alhaji Gero (Jhapa)
- (Serbia) Lazar Arsić (Jhapa)
- (Nepal) Laken Limbu (Jhapa)
- (France) Vincent Koziello (Kathmandu Rayzrs)
- (Senegal) Bakary Mané (Kathmandu Rayzrs)
- (Nepal) Aditya Shakya (Lalitpur City)
- (Nepal) Mani Kumar Lama (Lalitpur City)
- (Nepal) Ananta Tamang (Lalitpur City)
- (Nepal) Santosh Khatri (Lalitpur City)
- (Nepal) Nabin Lama (Lalitpur City)
- (Haiti) Kervens Belfort (Lalitpur City)
- (United States) Victor Mansaray (Chitwan)
- (Nepal) Niraj Chaudhary (Chitwan)
- (Nepal) Jaya Gurung (Chitwan)
- (Brazil) Sérgio Barboza (Dhangadhi)
- (Nepal) Krittish Chhunju (Dhangadhi)
- (Cameroon) Biassi Nyakwe (Pokhara Thunders)
- (Nepal) Ayush Ghalan (Pokhara Thunders)
- (Nepal) Samir Tamang (Pokhara Thunders)

1 own goal

- (Nepal) Kamal Shrestha (Lalitpur City, against Kathmandu Rayzrs)
- (Nepal) Dipesh Dhimal (Jhapa, against Dhangadhi)
- (Nepal) Amrit Shrestha (Dhangadhi, against Chitwan)
- (Nepal) Abhishek Limbu (Chitwan, against Pokhara Thunders)

Source: Hamro Khelkud

=== Hat-tricks ===
Player	Club	Against	Result	Date
(Lebanon) Ahmad Hijazi	Dhangadhi	Kathmandu Rayzrs	1–3	11 April 2025

=== Clean sheets ===
Rank	Player	Club	Clean sheets
1	(Cameroon) Yves Priso	Pokhara Thunders	5
2	(Spain) Walid Birrou	Dhangadhi	3
3	(Nepal) Abishek Baral	Kathmandu Rayzrs	2
4	(Montenegro) Nemanja Lemajić	Jhapa	2
5	(Jamaica) Amal Knight	Chitwan	2
6	(Nepal) Deep Karki	Butwal Lumbini	1
7	(Nepal) Samit Shrestha	Lalitpur City	1
8	(France) Jeffrey Baltus	Lalitpur City	1
