= 2021 Pokhara Thunders F.C. season =

Pokhara Thunders
2021 season
- Owner: Laxmi Motors
- Chairman: Nirakar Shrestha
- Head coach: (Nepal) Nabin Neupane
- Stadium: Dasharath Rangasala
- Super League: 5th of 7
- Top goalscorer: League: (Nepal) Nawayug Shrestha (2 Goals); All: (Nepal) Nawayug Shrestha (2 Goals)
Home colours	Away colours

The 2021 season is Pokhara Thunders's 1st Nepal Super League season.

== Season overview ==
On 19 March, Pokhara Thunders announced the signing of Nepal national football team striker Nawayug Shrestha as its marquee player.

On the auction of Nepal Super League, Pokhara Thunders acquired various players such as Nepal national football team captain Sujal Shrestha, Goalkeeper Arpan Karki, Nitin Thapa, etc.

Pokhara Thunders announced the signing of three overseas player, Ketcha Yannick, Bidias Rim Raphael and Moussa Abagana. All of these players are Cameroonian citizen.

== Competition ==
=== Nepal Super League ===
==== Results ====
25 April 2021 3	Pokhara Thunders	0–2	Butwal Lumbini F.C.	Kathmandu
17:30 NST		Report	Beadum 42'; A. Bhandari 77' (o.g.)	Stadium: Dasharath Rangasala; Man of the Match: Beadum (Butwal Lumbini F.C.)

28 April 2021 7	Biratnagar City FC	0–1	Pokhara Thunders	Kathmandu
17:30 NST		Report	N. Shrestha 83'	Stadium: Dasharath Rangasala; Man of the Match: N. Shrestha (Pokhara Thunders)

30 April 2021 9	Kathmandu Rayzrs FC	0–0	Pokhara Thunders	Kathmandu
17:30 NST		Report		Stadium: Dasharath Rangasala; Man of the Match: Padam Moktan (Pokhara Thunders)

2 May 2021 12	Pokhara Thunders	0–0	Lalitpur City FC	Kathmandu
17:30 NST	Ketcha Wannick (yellow card) 87'	Report		Stadium: Dasharath Rangasala; Man of the Match: Prabesh Kunwar Danuwar (Lalitpur City FC)

5 May 2021 15	Dhangadhi FC	1–0	Pokhara Thunders	Kathmandu
17:30 NST	D. Gurung 68'	Report		Stadium: Dasharath Rangasala; Man of the Match: Kiran Chemjong (Dhangadhi FC)

7 May 2021 18	Pokhara Thunders	2–1	FC Chitwan	Kathmandu
17 :30 NST	N. Shrestha 86'; B. Raphael 90+5'	Report	S. Lekhi 72'	Stadium: Dasharath Rangasala; Man of the Match: Ravi Paswan (Pokhara Thunders)

==== League table ====
Pos	Team	Pld	W	D	L	GF	GA	GD	Pts	Qualification
3	Lalitpur City	6	2	3	1	7	3	+4	9	Advance to Playoffs
4	Butwal Lumbini	6	2	2	2	7	6	+1	8	Advance to Playoffs
5	Pokhara Thunders	6	2	2	2	3	4	−1	8	
6	Biratnagar City	6	2	1	3	11	12	−1	7	
7	Chitwan	6	0	2	4	5	12	−7	2	

Source: Goal Nepal
Rules for classification: 1) points; 2) head-to-head points; 3) head-to-head goal difference; 4) goal difference; 5) number of goals scored; 6) play-off match

== Statistics ==
As of 18 May 2021

No.	Player	Pos.	Nepal Super League			
No.	Player	Pos.	Apps(Sub)	Goal	Booked	Sent off (straight red)
1	(Nepal) Ajit Prajapati	GK				
2	(Nepal) Gautam Shrestha	DF	4		1	
3	(Nepal) Ajit Bhandari	DF	4(2)		1	
4	(Nepal) Kamal Thapa	MF	0(2)			
5	(Nepal) Suraj Gurung	DF	0(1)			
6	(Cameroon) Bidias Rim Raphael	MF	6	1		
7	(Nepal) Sujit Budhathoki	MF	0(3)			
8	(Nepal) Nitin Thapa	MF				
9	(Nepal) Rajesh Pariyar	FW	1(3)			
10	(Nepal) Anil Gurung	FW	0(4)			
11	(Nepal) Sujal Shrestha	MF	6			
12	(Nepal) Ravi Paswan	FW	6			
13	(Nepal) Padam Kumar Tamang	MF	5(1)			
15	(Nepal) Prabin Kumar Syangten	FW	0(2)			
17	(Cameroon) Ketcha Yannick	DF	5		3	
18	(Nepal) Nawayug Shrestha	FW	6	2	1	
19	(Nepal) Ayush Ghalan	MF	5(1)			
22	(Nepal) Deep Karki	MF	6			
23	(Nepal) Man Bahadur Tamang	DF	4			
27	(Cameroon) Moussa Abagana	FW	6		1	
32	(Nepal) Dipak Gurung	DF	2			
	(Nepal) Sujal Shrestha	MF				
	(Nepal) Sushil Rai	MF				

=== Goalscorers ===
Rank	No.	Pos.	Player	Nepal Super League
1	18	FW	(Nepal) Nawayug Shrestha	2
2	6	MF	(Cameroon) Bidias Rim Raphael	1
