= 2021 F.C. Chitwan season =

FC Chitwan
2021 season
- Owner: Game On Pvt. Ltd.
- Chairman: Sachin Dhakal
- Head coach: Meghraj K.C.
- Stadium: Dasharath Rangasala
- Super League: 7th of 7
Home colours	Away colours

The 2021 season is FC Chitwan's 1st Nepal Super League season.

== Season overview ==
On 15 March, FC Chitwan announced the signing of Nepal national football team striker Bharat Khawas as its marquee player.

On the auction of Nepal Super League, FC Chitwan acquired various players such as goalkeeper Bishal Sunuwar, Bikash Khawas, Tej Budhathoki, etc.

On 1 April, FC Chitwan called Syansu Bhusal to join the team.

FC Chitwan announced the signing of three overseas player, El Sayed Shaaban and Ahmed Bogy from Egypt, and Goran Jerković from France.

== Competition ==
=== Nepal Super League ===
==== Results ====
26 April 2021 4	Lalitpur City FC	1–1	FC Chitwan	Kathmandu
17:30 NST	Bikash Khawas (yellow card) 42'; K. Shrestha 49'; Rup Bahadur Lama (yellow card) 80'	Report	Arpan Karki (yellow card) 60'; N. Novruzov (yellow card) 88'; A. Tamang 91' (o.g.)	Stadium: Dasharath Rangasala; Man of the Match: Bishal Sunar (FC Chitwan)

28 April 2021 6	FC Chitwan	2–2	Butwal Lumbini F.C.	Kathmandu
14:30 NST	G.P. Karki 15'; T. B. Budhathoki 19'	Report	A. Lama 32'; L. Ruchal 65'	Stadium: Dasharath Rangasala; Man of the Match: G.P. Karki (FC Chitwan)

1 May 2021 10	Dhangadhi FC	3–0	FC Chitwan	Kathmandu
14:30 NST	N. Limbu 64'; Afeez Oladipo 69'; B. Tamang 80'	Report		Stadium: Dasharath Rangasala; Man of the Match: N. Limbu (Dhangadhi FC)

3 May 2021 13	FC Chitwan	0–2	Biratnagar City FC	Kathmandu
17:30 NST		Report	P. Manzi 73'; S. Tamang 89'	Stadium: Dasharath Rangasala; Man of the Match: Rajeen Dhimal (Biratnagar City FC)

7 May 2021 18	Pokhara Thunders	2–1	FC Chitwan	Kathmandu
17 :30 NST	N. Shrestha 86'; B. Raphael 90+5'	Report	S. Lekhi 72'	Stadium: Dasharath Rangasala; Man of the Match: Ravi Paswan (Pokhara Thunders)

9 May 2021 21	FC Chitwan	1–2	Kathmandu Rayzrs FC	Kathmandu
17:30 NST	R. Lopchan 40'	Report	M. Olaoumu 19'; S. Rai 34'	Stadium: Dasharath Rangasala; Man of the Match: Tej Tamang (Kathmandu Rayzrs FC)

==== League table ====
Pos	Team	Pld	W	D	L	GF	GA	GD	Pts	Qualification
4	Butwal Lumbini	6	2	2	2	7	6	+1	8	Advance to Playoffs
5	Pokhara Thunders	6	2	2	2	3	4	−1	8	
6	Biratnagar City	6	2	1	3	11	12	−1	7	
7	Chitwan	6	0	2	4	5	12	−7	2	

Source: Goal Nepal
Rules for classification: 1) points; 2) head-to-head points; 3) head-to-head goal difference; 4) goal difference; 5) number of goals scored; 6) play-off match

== Statistics ==
As of 18 May 2021

No.	Player	Pos.	Nepal Super League			
No.	Player	Pos.	Apps(Sub)	Goal	Booked	Sent off (straight red)
2	(Nepal) Simanta Thapa	DF	6			
4	(Nepal) Jitendra Karki	DF	1			
5	(Nepal) Kuldip Karki	DF	6		1	
6	(Nepal) Amit Tamang	DF	6	1	1	
7	(Egypt) Mohammed Almed Bogy	MF	1			
8	(Nepal) Syanshu Bhusal	MF	0(1)			
9	(Nepal) Rajiv Lopchan	FW	1(3)	1		
10	(France) Goran Jerkovic	FW	5(1)			
11	(Nepal) George Prince Karki	FW	5	1		
13	(Nepal) Roman Rasaili	GK	1			
14	(Egypt) El Sayed Shaaban	MF	5			
16	(Nepal) Bishal Sunar	GK	5			1
17	(Nepal) Rup Bahadur Lama	MF	1(5)		1	
19	(Nepal) Sunil Shrestha	MF	2(2)			
20	(Nepal) Bishwo Adhikari	MF	2(2)			
21	(Nepal) Bharat Khawas	FW	2			
22	(Nepal) Tek Bahadur Budhathoki	MF	3(3)	1		
23	(Nepal) Shishir Lekhi	MF	6	1		
25	(Nepal) Manish Thapa	MF	2(2)			
27	(Cameroon) Ruddy Mabakop	MF	4			
33	(Nepal) Bikash Khawas	DF	1		1	
41	(Nepal) Biwash Chaudhury	GK	0(1)			

=== Goalscorers ===
Rank	No.	Pos.	Player	Nepal Super League Goals
1	6	DF	(Nepal) Amit Tamang	1
1	9	FW	(Nepal) Rajiv Lopchan	1
1	11	FW	(Nepal) George Prince Karki	1
1	22	MF	(Nepal) Tek Bahadur Budathoki	1
1	23	MF	(Nepal) Shishir Lekhi	1
