= 2021 Butwal Lumbini F.C. season =

Butwal Lumbini
2023 season
- Chairman: Rajkumar Timilsina/Bhim Prasad Timalsina
- Head coach: Anant Thapa
- Stadium: Dasharath Rangasala
- Super League: 4th of 7 (qualified for playoffs)
- Top goalscorer: League: Laxman Ruchal (3 goals); All: Laxman Ruchal (3 goals)

The 2021 season is Butwal Lumbini F.C.'s 1st Nepal Super League season.

== Season overview ==
On the Auction of the Nepal Super League(NSL), Butwal Lumbini F.C. bought several players including Seshang Angdangbe, Rabin Shrestha, Amir Shrestha, etc.

On 3 April, Butwal Lumbini F.C. announced the signing of three overseas player. The players are Kareen Omoloja, William Opoku, and Armad Beadum.

On 20 April, Biraj Maharjan, former captain of Nepal national football team announced that he was joining Butwal Lumbini F.C.

== Competition ==
=== Nepal Super League ===
==== Results ====
25 April 2021 3	Pokhara Thunders	0–2	Butwal Lumbini F.C.	Kathmandu
17:30 NST		Report	Beadum 42'; A. Bhandari 77' (o.g.)	Stadium: Dasharath Rangasala; Man of the Match: Beadum (Butwal Lumbini F.C.)

28 April 2021 6	FC Chitwan	2–2	Butwal Lumbini F.C.	Kathmandu
14:30 NST	G.P. Karki 15'; T. B. Budhathoki 19'	Report	A. Lama 32'; L. Ruchal 65'	Stadium: Dasharath Rangasala; Man of the Match: G.P. Karki (FC Chitwan)

1 May 2021 11	Butwal Lumbini F.C.	2–2	Biratnagar City FC	Kathmandu
17:30 NST	K. Omolaja 6'; L. Ruchal 68'	Report	P. Manzi 42'; S. Tamang 90+2'	Stadium: Dasharath Rangasala; Man of the Match: P. Manzi (Biratnagar City FC)

4 May 2021 14	Butwal Lumbini F.C.	0–1	Kathmandu Rayzrs FC	Kathmandu
17:30 NST		Report	Stéphane Binong 5'	Stadium: Dasharath Rangasala; Man of the Match: Bikesh Kuthu (Kathmandu Rayzrs FC)

6 May 2021 16	Lalitpur City FC	1–0	Butwal Lumbini F.C.	Kathmandu
14:30 NST	N. Novruzov 5'; Vilim Posinkovic (yellow card) 23'; Kamal Shrestha (yellow card) 31'; Anjan Bista (yellow card) 50'; Ranjan Bista (yellow card) 90+2'	Report	William Opoku Asiedu (yellow card) 24'; Abhishek Rijal (yellow card) 40'; Sesehang Angdembe Limbu (yellow card) 43'; Man Bahadur Pariyar (yellow card) 68'; Jaya Gurung (yellow card) 74'	Stadium: Dasharath Rangasala; Man of the Match: Anjan Bista (Lalitpur City FC)

8 May 2021 20	Butwal Lumbini F.C.	1–0	Dhangadhi FC	Kathmandu
17:30 NST	S. Lama 80'	Report		Stadium: Dasharath Rangasala; Man of the Match: William Opoku (Butwal Lumbini F.C.)

==== League table ====
Pos	Team	Pld	W	D	L	GF	GA	GD	Pts	Qualification
2	Dhangadhi	6	3	1	2	8	5	+3	10	Advance to Playoffs
3	Lalitpur City	6	2	3	1	7	3	+4	9	Advance to Playoffs
4	Butwal Lumbini	6	2	2	2	7	6	+1	8	Advance to Playoffs
5	Pokhara Thunders	6	2	2	2	3	4	−1	8	
6	Biratnagar City	6	2	1	3	11	12	−1	7	

Source: Goal Nepal
Rules for classification: 1) points; 2) head-to-head points; 3) head-to-head goal difference; 4) goal difference; 5) number of goals scored; 6) play-off match

=== Bracket ===
Preliminary
1	Kathmandu Rayzrs	1
2	Dhangadhi (a.e.t.)	2
3	Lalitpur City	1
4	Butwal Lumbini	0

Preliminary
Q1L	Kathmandu Rayzrs	3
EW	Lalitpur City	0

Final
Q1W	Dhangadhi	0
Q2W	Kathmandu Rayzers	1

=== Preliminary ===
12 May 2021 Eliminator	Lalitpur City FC	1–0	Butwal Lumbini F.C.	Kathmandu
17:30 NST	Vilim Posinkovic (yellow card) 23'; Kamal Shrestha (yellow card) 31'; Anjan Bista (yellow card) 50', (goal) 61'; Ranjan Bista (yellow card) 90+2'		William Opoku Asiedu (yellow card) 24'; Abhishek Rijal (yellow card) 40'; Sesehang Angdembe Limbu (yellow card) 56'; Man Bahadur Pariyar (yellow card) 68'; Jaya Gurung (yellow card) 74'	Stadium: Dasharath Rangasala; Referee: Prajwol Chhetri; Man of the Match: Arpan Karki (Lalitpur City FC)

== Statistics ==
As of 18 May 2021

No.	Player	Pos.	Nepal Super League			
No.	Player	Pos.	Apps	Goal	Booked	Sent off (straight red)
1	(Nepal) Satrudhan Chaudhary	GK				
2	(Nepal) Rabin Shrestha	DF	4			
3	(Nepal) Biraj Maharjan	DF	7		1	
4	(Nigeria) Kareem Omolaja	DF	7	1	2	
5	(Nepal) Man Bahadur	DF	5(2)		2	
6	(Nepal) Randip Poudel	DF	1(1)			
7	(Nepal) Amir Shrestha	MF	3			
8	(Nepal) Jaya Gurung	MF	1(6)		2	
9	(Nepal) Suman Lama	FW	5(2)	1		
10	(Nepal) Aashish Lama	MF	7	1		
11	(Chad) Armand Beaudim	MF	4	1		
12	(Nepal) Anil Maharjan	MF				
13	(Nepal) Ravi Thapa Magar	DF	3(3)			
15	(Nepal) Chetan Tharu	DF	1(2)		1	
16	(Nepal) Shiva Gurung	MF				
17	(Nepal) Pasang Lama	MF	0(1)			
19	(Nepal) Laxman Ruchal	MF	7	2	2	
20	(Nepal) Bishal Shrestha	MF	7		1	
23	(Nepal) Sesehang Angdembe	MF	4		2	
27	(Nepal) Abhishek Rijal	FW	3		2	
30	(Nepal) Dipesh Ale	FW	1(2)			
42	(Ghana) William Opoku	FW	7		2	

=== Goalscorers ===
Includes all competitive matches. The list is sorted alphabetically by surname when total goals are equal.

Rank	No.	Pos.	Player	Goals
1	19	MF	(Nepal) Laxman Ruchal	2
2	10	MF	(Nepal) Aashish Lama	1
2	11	MF	(Chad) Armand Beaudim	1
2	4	DF	(Nigeria) Kareem Omolaja	1
2	9	FW	(Nepal) Suman Lama	1

== Awards ==
NSL Fair Play Award
Season	Team	Ref
2020–21	Butwal Lumbini F.C.	
