= 2021 Dhangadhi F.C. season =

Dhangadhi FC
2021 season
- Owner: Go Dreamers Pvt. LTd.
- Chairman: Subash Shahi
- Manager: Fuja Tope
- Stadium: Dasharath Rangasala
- Super League: Runner Up
- Top goalscorer: League: (Nigeria) Oladipo Olawale Afeez (4 goals); All: (Nigeria) Oladipo Olawale Afeez (4 goals)

The 2021 season is Dhangadhi F.C.'s 1st Nepal Super League season.

== Season overview ==
On 15 March, Dhangadhi FC has announced the signing of Nepal national football team midfielder Bishal Rai as a marquee player for Nepal Super League (NSL).

On the auction of Nepal Super League, Dhangadhi FC bought several national level players such as Dinesh Rajbanshi, Rupesh KC, Pujan Uperkoti, etc.

On 15 April, Dhangadhi FC signed a contract with Nepal national football team Goalkeeper Kiran Chemjong and has introduced him as a player.

On 16 April, Dhangadhi FC signed contract with Afeez Oladipo.

== Competitions ==
=== Nepal Super League ===
==== Results ====
25 April 2021 1	Biratnagar City FC	3–0	Dhangadhi FC	Kathmandu
14:30 NST	B. Dhimal 15'; Oluwawunmi 57'; S. Tamang 69'	Report		Stadium: Dasharath Rangasala Stadium; Man of the Match: S. Tamang (Biratnagar City FC)

27 April 2021 2	Dhangadhi FC	3–0	Kathmandu Rayzrs FC	Kathmandu
17:30 NST	T. Basnet 19'; Afeez Oladipo 23', 45+5'; R. Dangal (yellow card) 62' (yellow-red card) 68'	Report		Stadium: Dasharath Rangasala Stadium; Man of the Match: Afeez Oladipo (Dhangadhi FC)

29 April 2021 3	Lalitpur City FC	1–1	Dhangadhi FC	Kathmandu
17:30 NST	B. Rana (yellow card) 4'; Prabesh Kunwar Danuwar (yellow card) 60'; Niroj Basnet (yellow card) 69'; R. Bista 78'	Report	Pujan Uparkoti (yellow card) 28'; Rupesh KC (yellow card) 36'; Kiran Chemjong (yellow card) 43'; Afeez Oladipo 72'	Stadium: Dasharath Rangasala Stadium; Man of the Match: Dinesh Rajbanshi (Dhangadhi FC)

1 May 2021 4	Dhangadhi FC	3–0	FC Chitwan	Kathmandu
14:30 NST	N. Limbu 64'; Afeez Oladipo 69'; B. Tamang 80'	Report		Stadium: Dasharath Rangasala Stadium; Man of the Match: N. Limbu (Dhangadhi FC)

5 May 2021 5	Dhangadhi FC	1–0	Pokhara Thunders	Kathmandu
17:30 NST	D. Gurung 68'	Report		Stadium: Dasharath Rangasala Stadium; Man of the Match: Kiran Chemjong (Dhangadhi FC)

8 May 2021 6	Butwal Lumbini FC	1–0	Dhangadhi FC	Kathmandu
17:30 NST	S. Lama 80'	Report		Stadium: Dasharath Rangasala Stadium; Man of the Match: William Opoku (Butwal Lumbini FC)

==== League table ====
Pos	Team	Pld	W	D	L	GF	GA	GD	Pts	Qualification
1	Kathmandu Rayzrs (C)	6	4	1	1	9	8	+1	13	Advance to Playoffs
2	Dhangadhi	6	3	1	2	8	5	+3	10	Advance to Playoffs
3	Lalitpur City	6	2	3	1	7	3	+4	9	Advance to Playoffs
4	Butwal Lumbini	6	2	2	2	7	6	+1	8	Advance to Playoffs

Source: Goal Nepal
Rules for classification: 1) points; 2) head-to-head points; 3) head-to-head goal difference; 4) goal difference; 5) number of goals scored; 6) play-off match
(C) Champions

== Playoffs ==
=== Bracket ===
Preliminary
1	Kathmandu Rayzrs	1
2	Dhangadhi (a.e.t.)	2
3	Lalitpur City	1
4	Butwal Lumbini	0

Preliminary
Q1L	Kathmandu Rayzrs	3
EW	Lalitpur City	0

Final
Q1W	Dhangadhi	0
Q2W	Kathmandu Rayzers	1

=== Preliminary ===
11 May 2021 Qualifier 1	Kathmandu Rayzrs FC	1–2 (a.e.t.)	Dhangadhi FC	Kathmandu
17:30 NST	Tej Tamang 75'		Afeez Olawale Oladipo (yellow card) 33'; Darshan Gurung (yellow card) 44'; Pujan Uparkoti 78'; Bishal Rai 108'	Stadium: Dasharath Rangasala

=== Final ===
15 May 2021 Final	Dhangadhi FC	0-1	Kathmandu Rayzrs FC	Kathmandu
17:30 NST	Bishal Rai (yellow card) 71'		M. Olaoumu 21'	Stadium: Dasharath Rangasala; Referee: Nabin Maharjan; Man of the Match: Florent Koara (Kathmandu Rayzrs FC)

== Statistics ==
As of 18 May 2021

No.	Player	Pos.	Nepal Super League			
No.	Player	Pos.	Apps(Subs)	Goal	Booked	Sent off (straight red)
1	(Nepal) Tekendra Thapa	GK				
2	(Nepal) Dinesh Rajbanshi	DF	8			
3	(Cameroon) Ernest Tampi	MF	1			
4	(Nepal) Ashok Khawas	DF	8			
5	(Nepal) Yuddha Shahi	DF	1(3)			
6	(Nepal) Nishan Khadka	MF	8	1		
8	(Nepal) Bishal Rai	MF	8	1	1	
9	(Nigeria) Afeez Oladipo	FW	7	4	1	
10	(Nepal) Yogesh Gurung	MF	1			
11	(Nepal) Soujan Rai	MF	4(3)		1	
12	(Nepal) Karlosh Bakhariya	MF				
13	(Nepal) Rupesh KC	MF	4(2)		3	
14	(Nepal) Darshan Gurung	MF	5(2)	1	2	
15	(Nepal) Pujan Uparkoti	MF	7(1)	1	1	
16	(Nepal) Kiran Chemjong	GK	8		1	
17	(Nepal) Nishan Sunar	MF	0(2)			
20	(Nepal) Ramesh Dangal	DF	1(2)			1
21	(Nepal) Buddha Bal Tamang	MF	4(3)	1		
23	(Nepal) Nirajan Maharjan	DF	0(1)			
25	(Nepal) Nishan Limbu	FW	4(2)			
26	(Cameroon) Franklin Kuete Talla	DF	5			
39	(Nepal) Tanka Bahadur Basnet	MF	4(3)	1		

=== Goalscorers ===
Includes all competitive matches. The list is sorted alphabetically by surname when total goals are equal.

Rank	No.	Pos.	Player	Nepal Super League Goals
1	9	FW	(Nigeria) Afeez Oladipo	4
2	8	MF	(Nepal) Bishal Rai	1
2	21	MF	(Nepal) Buddha Bal Tamang	1
2	14	MF	(Nepal) Darshan Gurung	1
2	25	FW	(Nepal) Nishan Khadka	1
2	15	MF	(Nepal) Pujan Uparkoti	1
2	39	MF	(Nepal) Tanka Bahadur Basnet	1

== Awards ==
=== NSL Super Defender of the League ===
Season	Player	Ref.
2020–21	(Nepal) Dinesh Rajbanshi	

=== NSL Super Goalkeeper of the League ===
Season	Player	Ref.
2021	(Nepal) Kiran Chemjong	
