= 2019 AMF Futsal Men's World Cup =

2019 XII AMF Futsal Men's World Cup
Campeonato mundial de fútsal de la AMF 2019

Tournament details
- Host country: Argentina
- Dates: 31 March – 7 April
- Teams: 16 (from 5 confederations)
- Venue: 4 (in 4 host cities)

Final positions
- Champions: Argentina (2nd title)
- Runners-up: Brazil
- Third place: Paraguay
- Fourth place: South Africa

Tournament statistics
- Matches played: 32

The 2019 AMF Futsal Men's World Cup was the 12th edition of the AMF Futsal World Cup. The tournament was held in Argentina from 31 March to 7 April in the cities of Montecarlo, Posadas, Eldorado and Oberá. Sixteen national teams from all confederations participated in the tournament.

== Rankings ==
Pos	Team
1	Argentina
2	Brazil
3	Paraguay
4	South Africa
5	Colombia
6	Catalonia
7	Morocco
8	France
9	Italy
10	Uruguay
11	Curaçao
12	United States
13	Australia
14	Nepal
15	Bolivia
16	Pakistan
