= Samir Tamang =

Nepalese footballer

Personal information
- Place of birth: Nijgadh, Nepal
- Position: Centre-forward

Team information
- Current team: Pokhara Thunders
- Number: 7

Youth career
- –2024: Salesh Youth Club

Senior career*
| Years | Team | Apps | (Gls) |
| 2024–2025 | Church Boys United | | |
| 2025 | Pokhara Thunders | 6 | (1) |
| 2025– | Satdobato Youth | | |

International career
| 2023– | Nepal U20 | 11 | (9) |
| 2024– | Nepal | 1 | (0) |
- * Club domestic league appearances and goals

Samir Tamang is a Nepalese professional footballer who currently plays for Nepal Super League club Satdobato Youth and the Nepal national team.

== Club career ==
Born in Nijgadh, Tamang was originally a cricket player before shifting his focus to football. He initially played as a goalkeeper before a hand injury forced him to become a forward. He had not competed in any domestic league prior to his international debuts because of a lack of competitions in his region. Therefore, he competed in only district, provincial and central level selections. In 2023, Tamang competed in the Aaha! Gold Cup with Salesh Youth Club. He scored two goals against Gaighat FC to advance to the semi-finals and was named Man of the Match for his performance. He scored and was named the Man of the Match again as Salesh Youth Club defeated Birgunj United FC to advance to the final.

In January 2024, Tamang made his Martyr's Memorial A-Division League debut after joining Church Boys United. He scored his club's only goal in an Aaha! Gold Cup victory over Nepal Police which saw Church Boys United advance to the semi-final. Tamang was named Man of the Match for his performance. In the next match, he again scored his team's lone tally as the club defeated Nepal Army to advance to the final. Tamang was again named Man of the Match.

In February 2025, it was announced that Tamang had been signed by Pokhara Thunders of the Nepal Super League for the 2025 season. He scored his first goal for the club on 3 April 2025 in a 2–3 loss to Lalitpur City.

== International career ==
As a youth, Tamang represented Nepal at the 2023 SAFF U-19 Championship and the 2024 SAFF U-20 Championship. He scored three goals and was the competition's joint top scorer in 2023. He scored two more goals in the 2024 tournament, including Nepal's only goal in a defeat to Bangladesh in the final.

In February 2024, Tamang scored two goals for the Nepal national under-23 team in a 5–1 victory over a representative team from China's Yushu Prefecture. Later in 2024, he was the second-highest scorer in 2025 AFC U-20 Asian Cup qualification with four goals, including a hat-trick against Chinese Taipei.

Tamang received his first senior international call up in March 2024 for a pair of 2026 FIFA World Cup qualification matches against Bahrain. In preparation for qualification, Nepal played an unofficial friendly against Malaysia. Tamang scored Nepal's only goal in the eventual 1–5 defeat. He made his official debut on 21 March 2024 in the first match against Bahrain, coming on as a second-half substitute. The following month, he was called up again for a friendly against the England C team.

=== International statistics ===
As of match played 21 March 2024

Nepal
| Year | Apps | Goals |
|---|---|---|
| 2024 | 1 | 0 |
| Total | 1 | 0 |

=== International goals ===
==== Youth ====
| # | Date | Venue | Opponent | Score | Result | Competition |
|---|---|---|---|---|---|---|
| 1 | 25 September 2023 | Dasharath Rangasala, Kathmandu, Nepal | Maldives U20 | 2–0 | 4-1 | 2023 SAFF U-19 Championship |
| 2 | 25 September 2023 | Dasharath Rangasala, Kathmandu, Nepal | Maldives U20 | 4–1 | 4-1 | 2023 SAFF U-19 Championship |
| 3 | 27 September 2023 | Dasharath Rangasala, Kathmandu, Nepal | India U20 | 1–1 | 1-1 | 2023 SAFF U-19 Championship |
| 4 | 22 August 2024 | ANFA Complex, Lalitpur, Nepal | Bangladesh U20 | 1–0 | 2-1 | 2024 SAFF U-20 Championship |
| 5 | 28 August 2024 | ANFA Complex, Lalitpur, Nepal | India U20 | 1–3 | 1-4 | 2024 SAFF U-20 Championship |
| 6 | 21 September 2024 | Fu Jen Catholic University Stadium, New Taipei City, Taiwan | Cambodia U20 | 1–2 | 1-4 | 2025 AFC U-20 Asian Cup qualification |
| 7 | 23 September 2024 | Fu Jen Catholic University Stadium, New Taipei City, Taiwan | Chinese Taipei U20 | 1–0 | 3-1 | 2025 AFC U-20 Asian Cup qualification |
| 8 | 23 September 2024 | Fu Jen Catholic University Stadium, New Taipei City, Taiwan | Chinese Taipei U20 | 2–0 | 3-1 | 2025 AFC U-20 Asian Cup qualification |
| 9 | 23 September 2024 | Fu Jen Catholic University Stadium, New Taipei City, Taiwan | Chinese Taipei U20 | 3–1 | 3-1 | 2025 AFC U-20 Asian Cup qualification |
Last updated 7 October 2024
