= Laken Limbu =

Nepalese international footballer

Personal information
- Full name: Laken Limbu
- Date of birth: 24 July 2002 (age 24)
- Place of birth: Singapore
- Height: 1.77 m (5 ft 10 in)
- Position: Midfielder

Team information
- Current team: Kirivong Sok Sen Chey
- Number: 8

Youth career
- 2019–2021: Jhapa

Senior career*
| Years | Team | Apps | (Gls) |
| 2021 | Jhapa | 0 | (0) |
| 2021–2023 | Three Star Club | 34 | (3) |
| 2023 | → Machhindra (loan) | | |
| 2024 | Church Boys United | | |
| 2024–2025 | Delhi FC | 12 | (0) |
| 2025 | Jhapa | 6 | (1) |
| 2025– | Kirivong Sok Sen Chey | 25 | (1) |

International career
| 2023– | Nepal | 16 | (0) |
- * Club domestic league appearances and goals as of 17 May 2026

Laken Limbu (born 24 July 2002) is a Nepalese professional footballer who is currently playing as a midfielder for Cambodian Premier League club Kirivong Sok Sen Chey and the Nepal national team.

== Early life ==
Born in Singapore, Laken joined in the F17 Football Academy at the age of 12. After three years, he started training with the ANZA Soccer Academy. During his time in Singapore, Laken participated in football tournaments in Sweden, Malaysia, and Spain, and also played in the Aaha Rara Gold Cup 2078 in Nepal.

== Club career ==
In early 2021, Laken moved to Nepal permanently, joining third division club Jhapa in the C-Division League qualifiers.

=== Three Star Club ===
In September 2021, Laken signed with Nepal top-tier club Three Star Club and in his first A-Division League season, he featured in eight matches and started. With a total playing time of 405 minutes, Laken made one assist. He played the full 90 minutes twice, against Sankata Boys and Nepal Police Club. He played 26 games in his second season, registering 3 goals and 4 assists. His performances earned him a callup to the Nepal national team.

==== Loan to Machhindra ====
In August 2023, Laken signed with Machhindra on a month loan deal. He make his debut in the 2023–24 AFC Cup qualifying play-offs against Bhutanese club Paro.

=== Church Boys United ===
On 1 February 2024, Laken signed with Church Boys United.

=== Delhi ===
On 15 September 2024, Limbu signed his first overseas professional contract with Indian club Delhi and will be playing for the club in the I-League. His moved was a success after a Singapore-based agency, Rookbook Sports help to smoothen the transfer for him to Delhi.

=== Return to Jhapa ===
In late March 2025, Limbu returned to his former club Jhapa. He scored a goal on 16 April in a 1–1 draw to Lalitpur City.

=== Kirivong Sok Sen Chey ===
On 15 July 2025, Limbu signed a contract with Cambodian Premier League club Kirivong Sok Sen Chey where he will play under Singaporean head coach, Satyasagara.

== International career ==
On 15 June 2023, Laken made his international debut for Nepal in a friendly loss to the Philippines. He was also part of the main squad for the 2023 SAFF Championship.

On 21 March 2025, Laken played in a friendly match against his birth country, Singapore at the Singapore National Stadium where he was applause by the Singaporean fans after the final whistle.

== Personal life ==
Laken was born in Singapore where his father was serving as the Gurkha Contingent in the Singapore Police Force at the point of time where he resides inside Mount Vernon Camp. He attended several local school like Cedar Primary School and Serangoon Garden Secondary School. After his father's service in Singapore ended, he returned to Nepal.

== Style of play ==
Limbu has been known for his strength.

== Career statistics ==
=== Club ===
As of 23 June 2023.

| Club | Season | Division | League | | Other | | Total | |
| Club | Season | Division | Apps | Goals | Apps | Goals | Apps | Goals |
|---|---|---|---|---|---|---|---|---|
| Three Star Club | 2021-22 | Martyr's Memorial A-Division League | 8 | 0 | 0 | 0 | 8 | 0 |
| Three Star Club | 2022-23 | Martyr's Memorial A-Division League | 26 | 3 | 0 | 0 | 26 | 3 |
| Three Star Club | Three Star Club Total | | 34 | 3 | 0 | 0 | 34 | 3 |
| Career total | | | 34 | 3 | 0 | 0 | 34 | 3 |

=== International ===
As of 21 June 2023.

Nepal national team
| Year | Apps | Goals |
|---|---|---|
| 2023 | 2 | 0 |
| Total | 2 | 0 |
