= Jonny Campbell (soccer) =

American soccer player (born 1991)

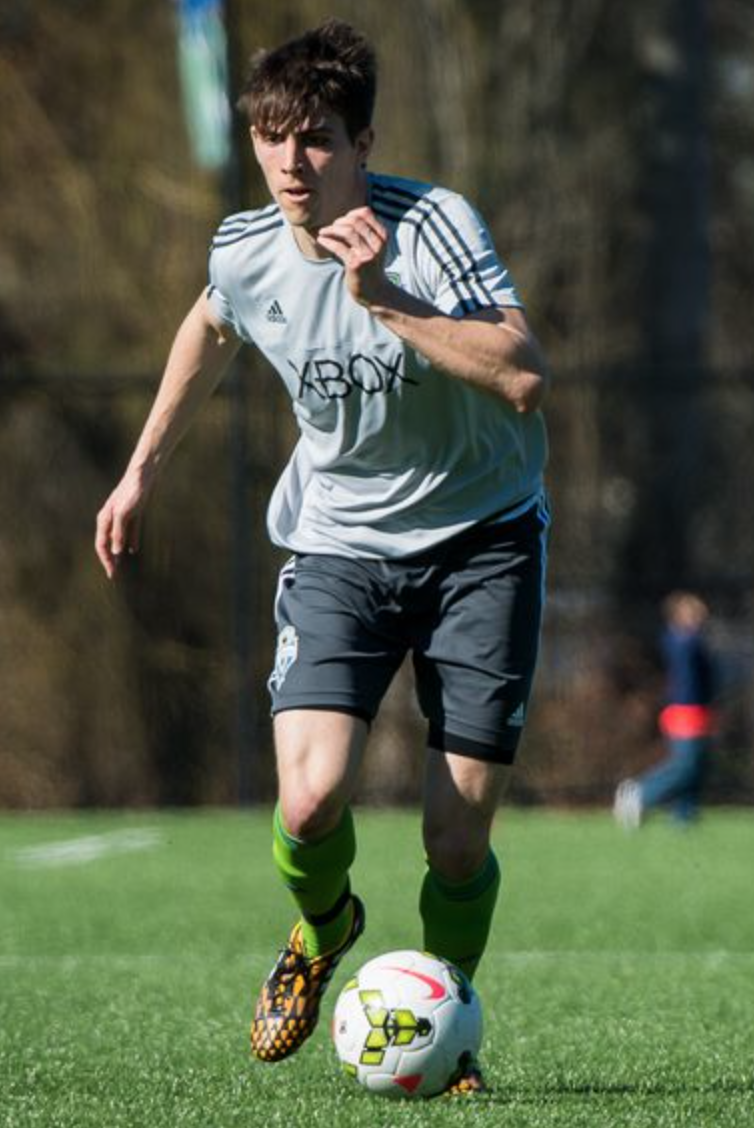
- Campbell in pre-season with Seattle Sounders FC in 2015

Personal information
- Full name: Jonathan David Ward Campbell
- Date of birth: September 24, 1991 (age 35)
- Place of birth: Johnson City, Tennessee, United States
- Height: 6 ft 1 in (1.85 m)
- Position: Center-back

Team information
- Current team: Kirivong Sok Sen Chey
- Number: 99

Youth career
- 1999–2006: East Tennessee Soccer Federation
- 2006–2009: FC Alliance

College career
Years	Team	Apps	(Gls)
2009–2013	East Tennessee State University	40	(5)

Senior career*
Years	Team	Apps	(Gls)
2012–2013	IMG Academy Bradenton	20	(2)
2014	Philadelphia Fury	10	(0)
2015	Charlotte Independence		
2016	FC Miami City	9	(0)
2017–2018	Chachoengsao	26	(2)
2018	Phnom Penh Crown	18	(1)
2019–2020	Preah Khan Reach	40	(3)
2021	United City		
2022	Syracuse Pulse	6	(0)
2022	Tiffy Army	13	(0)
2022–2023	Ho Chi Minh City	9	(0)
2023–2024	Persela Lamongan	13	(2)
2024–2025	Persipura Jayapura	0	(0)
2025	Chitwan	6	(0)
2025–2026	Adhyaksa	5	(1)
2026–	Kirivong Sok Sen Chey	7	(0)
- * Club domestic league appearances and goals as of 9 November 2026

Jonathan David Ward Campbell (born September 24, 1991) is an American professional soccer player who plays as a center-back for Kirivong Sok Sen Chey.

== Early life and education ==
Campbell grew up in Johnson City, Tennessee. His grandmother and father are major influences in his life. His father owns a well-known music store in Johnson City, Campbell's Morrell Music.

While playing a variety of sports throughout his childhood, Campbell developed a love and passion for soccer.

== Playing career ==
=== College and amateur soccer ===
Campbell attended Science Hill High School. His youth career was spent with the East Tennessee Soccer Federation (ETSF) and FC Alliance between 1999 and 2009 before going on to play four years of college soccer at East Tennessee State University (ETSU), where he won three state titles with his Tennessee club team FC Alliance in 2006, 2007 and 2008.

At the age of 19, Campbell won his first Atlantic Sun Conference Championship in 2010 with ETSU. In his final season, ETSU won the Atlantic Sun Conference championship again, but were eliminated in the first round of the NCAA Tournament in 2013. Campbell finished the season with one goal and five assists as a defender.

While trying to fit into the professional world and pursue his dream of playing soccer for a living, during his college years Campbell had the opportunity to play in the Premier Development League (PDL) for IMG Academy Bradenton from 2012 to 2013.

=== Professional career ===
==== USA: Philadelphia Fury, Seattle Sounders 2, Charlotte Independence and FC Miami City ====
After his senior season with ETSU in 2013, Campbell played for Philadelphia Fury in the American Soccer League (ASL). He signed his first professional contract with the club and making his debut in September 2014.

After a great half-season with Philadelphia Fury, in 2015, Campbell pursued a move to the United Soccer League (USL). He started the year in pre-season training with Seattle Sounders FC 2 (S2), but later on that year signed a contract with Charlotte Independence.

Following his spell with Charlotte Independence, Campbell returned to the Premier Development League in 2016 to sign for FC Miami City.

==== South-East Asia: Thailand, Cambodia, Vietnam, the Philippines, and Indonesia ====
In 2017, Campbell joined Chachoengsao FC in Thai League 3. Initially signing as a striker, he eventually returned to center-back and went on to make 26 appearances, scoring two goals.

Campbell signed for Cambodian Premier League side Phnom Penh Crown in 2018. He scored his first goal in an international friendly against Malaysia Super League side Terengganu on 9 January 2018.

In 2019, Campbell moved to Preah Khan Reach Svay Rieng, where he won the 2019 Cambodian Premier League, following a record 25-game unbeaten run - a league record. The club competed in the 2020 AFC Cup, and off the back of a stand-out performance against United City (then known as Ceres-Negros), the Philippines Football League side secured his signature in early 2021.

However, COVID-19 restrictions in the Philippines cut short his time at United City.

Following a brief spell in the United States with Syracuse Pulse in the National Independent Soccer Association, Campbell returned to the Cambodian Premier League, signing for Tiffy Army in June 2022.

He moved to V.League 1 club Ho Chi Minh City FC in December 2022.

In August 2022, Campbell signed for Persela Lamongan in Indonesia's Liga 2. He scored on his debut on 10 September in a season-opening 2–0 victory over Persijap at Surajaya Stadium.

Campbell was nominated for the 2023/24 Liga 2 Best XI. He scored two goals and recorded nine clean sheets in 13 appearances for Persela.

==== FC Chitwan, Nepal Super League ====
Campbell joined F.C. Chitwan in March 2025 for the 2025 Nepal Super League.

Adhyaksa, Indonesia Championship

Campbell returned to the Championship (Indonesia) to sign for Adhyaksa F.C. Banten ahead of the 2025/26 season. He scored on his second appearance for the club in a 2-0 home win against F.C. Bekasi City.

== Honors ==
Preah Khan Reach Svay Rieng

- Cambodian Premier League: 2019
