= Puspalal Sharma =

Bhutanese former footballer

Personal information
- Full name: Puspalal Sharma
- Date of birth: November 8, 1983 (age 42)
- Place of birth: Thimphu, Bhutan
- Height: 1.80 m (5 ft 11 in)
- Position: Goalkeeper

Team information
- Current team: Paro FC (technical director)

Senior career*
Years	Team	Apps	(Gls)
–2008	Transport United		
2009–2017	Druk Star		

International career
–2015	Bhutan		
- * Club domestic league appearances and goals

Puspalal Sharma (born 8 November 1983) is a Bhutanese former professional footballer and later head coach. He coached Paro FC before joining Butwal Lumbini.

== Career ==
He made his first appearance for the Bhutan national football team in 2009. Sharma began his career as a school teacher, later transitioning to a university lecturer. He holds bachelor's degree from the Paro College of Education, and physical education degree from Lovely Professional University in Jalandhar, Punjab, India. He was awarded the Bhutan Premier League President's Coach of the Year for three consecutive years. He has been appointed the head coach of Butwal Lumbini for the 2025 Nepal Super League.
