= Ali Imani =

Iranian futsal player and coach

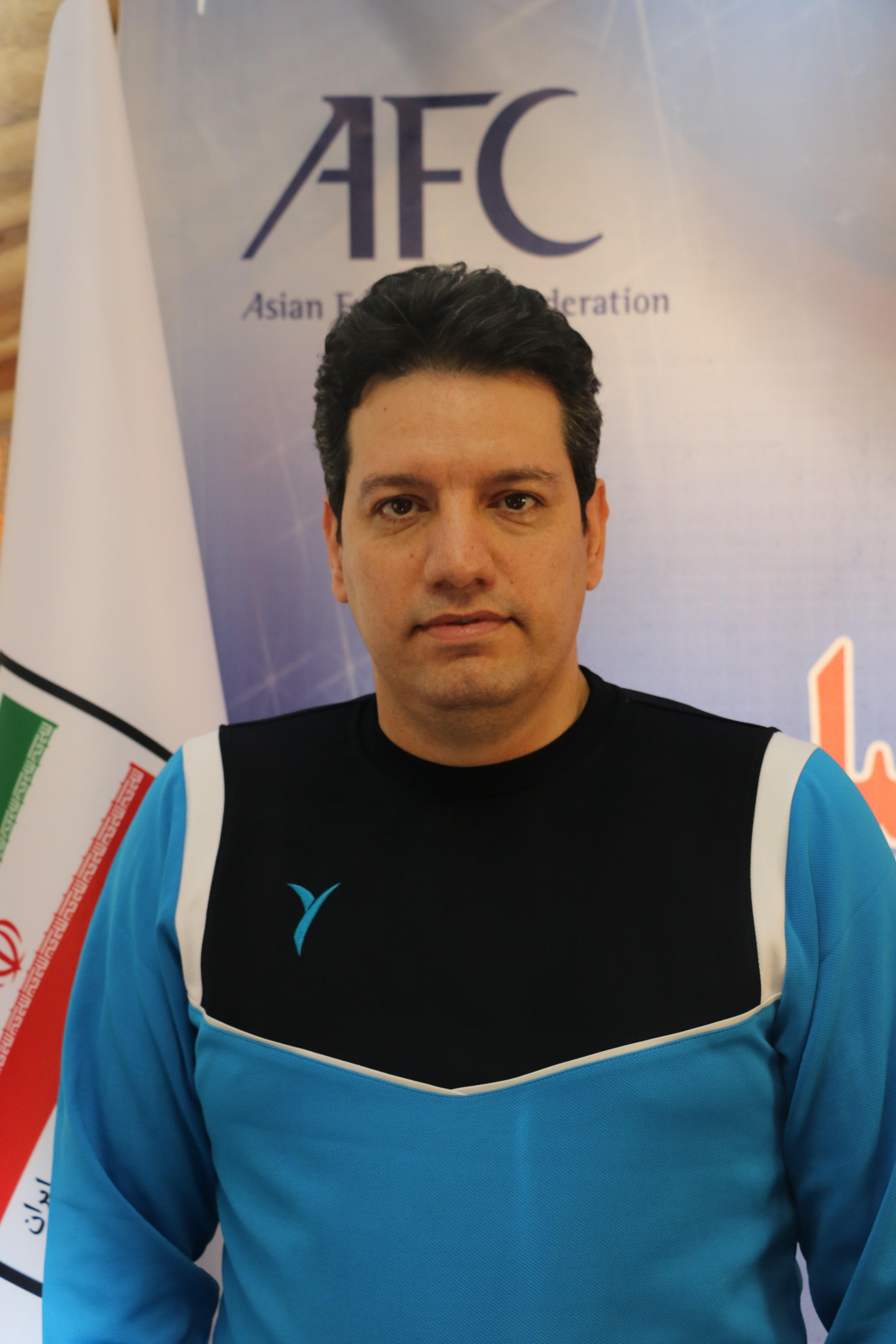

Personal information
- Full name: Ali Imani
- Date of birth: 30 November 1976 (age 49)
- Place of birth: Tehran، Iran
- Position: Goalkeeper

Senior career*
Years	Team	Apps	(Gls)
1998-1999	Pourya Vali		
1999	Koma Shiraz		
2000	Pas		
2000	Koma Shiraz		
2001	Pas		

International career
1998-2001	Iran		

Managerial career
- 2025-: Pakistan (Head Coach)
- * Club domestic league appearances and goals

Ali Imani (Persian: علی ایمانی; born November 30, 1976, in Tehran) is an Iranian futsal coach and former player, who is currently the Head Coach of Pakistan men's national futsal team.

Imani has AFC Futsal Coaching Certificate – Level 3
