= Imoh Ezekiel =

Nigerian footballer (born 1993)

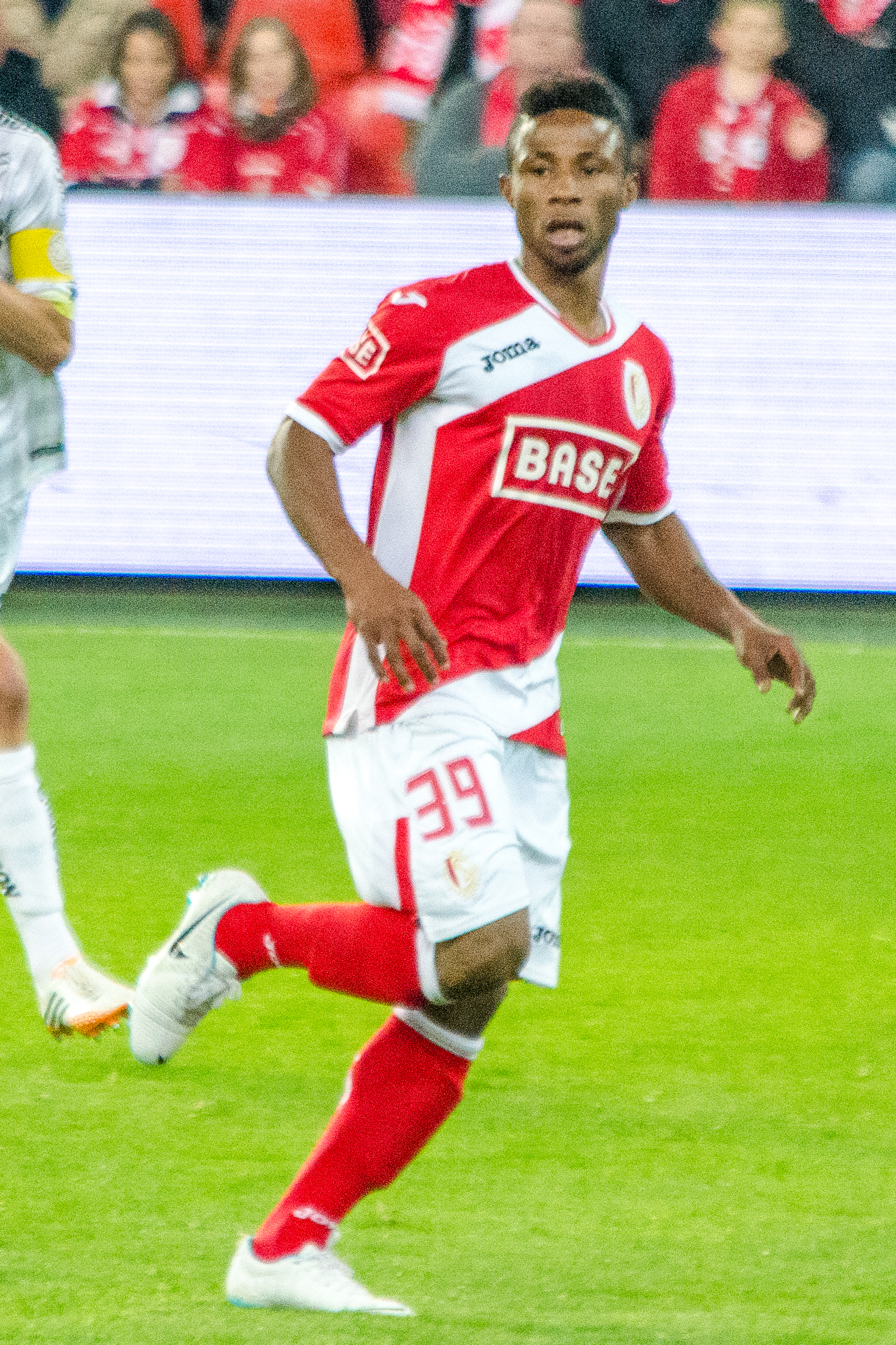
- Ezekiel with Standard Liege in 2014

Personal information
- Date of birth: 24 October 1993 (age 33)
- Place of birth: Lagos, Nigeria
- Height: 1.78 m (5 ft 10 in)
- Position: Striker

Team information
- Current team: Kaisar
- Number: 70

Youth career
- –2011: 36 Lions

Senior career*
Years	Team	Apps	(Gls)
2011–2012	36 Lions		
2012	→ Standard Liège (loan)	7	(1)
2012–2014	Standard Liège	73	(28)
2014–2017	Al-Arabi	38	(14)
2015	→ Standard Liège (loan)	13	(6)
2015–2016	→ Anderlecht (loan)	20	(1)
2017	Konyaspor	9	(0)
2018	Las Palmas	10	(0)
2018–2020	Kortrijk	31	(3)
2020–2021	Al Jazira	17	(4)
2021–2022	Al Dhafra	4	(1)
2023–2024	Lalitpur City	11	(6)
2024	UTA Arad	16	(2)
2025	Lalitpur City	8	(3)
2025–2026	Pogradeci	12	(5)
2026–	Kaisar	22	(2)

International career
2016	Nigeria Olympic	6	(0)
2014	Nigeria	1	(0)
Medal record
Representing Nigeria
Men's Football
Olympic Games
Bronze medal – third place	2016 Rio de Janeiro	Team
- * Club domestic league appearances and goals as of 19:12, 3 November 2026 (UTC)

Imoh Ezekiel (born 24 October 1993) is a Nigerian professional footballer who plays as a striker for Kazakhstan Premier League club Kaisar. He made one appearance for the Nigeria national team in 2014.

== Club career ==
Ezekiel joined Standard Liège in January 2012, making his debut on 19 February 2012, coming on as an 85th-minute substitute in a 4–2 loss to Zulte Waregem. On 2 July 2013, he was awarded with an improved contract which will keep him at the club until 2017. On 31 July 2014, Ezekiel was transferred to Qatar Stars League club Al-Arabi for around €8 million. On 11 August 2018, Ezekiel joined Belgian First Division A side Kortrijk on a three-year deal.

In March 2024, Ezekiel joined Liga I club UTA Arad.

== International career ==
Ezekiel received his first call-up to the Nigeria national team in February 2014. Ezekiel earned his first senior cap on 6 March, in the 0–0 draw with Mexico in a friendly match after coming on as a second-half substitute for Victor Moses.

He was selected by Nigeria for their 35-man provisional squad for the 2016 Summer Olympics.

== Career statistics ==
=== Club ===
As of 16 September 2024

Appearances and goals by club, season and competition
Club	Season	League			Cup		Other		Total	
Club	Season	Division	Apps	Goals	Apps	Goals	Apps	Goals	Apps	Goals
Standard Liège (loan)	2011–12	Belgian Pro League	7	1	—		0	0	7	1
Standard Liège	2012–13	Belgian Pro League	33	16	1	0	—		34	16
Standard Liège	2013–14	Belgian Pro League	39	12	2	1	7 (Note: Appearances in UEFA Europa League)	2	48	15
Standard Liège	2014–15	Belgian Pro League	1	0	—		1 (Note: Appearances in UEFA Champions League)	0	2	0
Standard Liège	Total		80	29	3	1	8	2	91	32
Al Arabi	2014–15	Qatar Stars League	14	6	0	0	—		14	6
Al Arabi	2016–17	Qatar Stars League	24	8	0	0	—		24	8
Al Arabi	Total		38	14	0	0	—		38	14
Standard Liège (loan)	2014–15	Belgian Pro League	13	6	—		—		13	6
Anderlecht (loan)	2015–16	Belgian Pro League	20	1	2	1	7	1	29	3
Konyaspor	2017–18	Süper Lig	9	0	0	0	4 (Note: One appearance in Turkish Super Cup, three appearances in UEFA Europa League)	0	13	0
Las Palmas	2017–18	La Liga	10	0	—		—		10	0
Kortrijk	2018–19	Belgian First Division A	19	1	1	0	5 (Note: Appearances in Belgian First Division A European play-offs)	3	25	4
Kortrijk	2019–20	Belgian First Division A	12	2	2	0	—		14	2
Kortrijk	Total		31	3	3	0	5	3	39	6
Al Jazira	2020–21	UAE Pro League	17	4	1	0	—		18	4
Al Dhafra	2021–22	UAE Pro League	4	1	4	0	—		8	1
Lalitpur City	2023	Nepal Super League	11	6	—		—		11	6
UTA Arad	2023–24	Liga I	8	1	—		—		8	1
UTA Arad	2024–25	Liga I	8	1	0	0	—		8	1
UTA Arad	Total		16	2	0	0	—		16	2
Career total			249	66	13	2	24	6	286	74

=== International ===
As of match played 5 March 2014

Appearances and goals by national team and year
National team	Year	Apps	Goals
Nigeria	2014	1	0
Total		1	0

== Honours ==
Konyaspor

- Turkish Super Cup: 2017

Al Jazira

- UAE Pro League: 2020–21

Lalitpur City

- Nepal Super League: 2023, 2025

Nigeria Olympic

- Summer Olympics bronze medalist: 2016

Individual

- Nepal Super League top scorer: 2023
