= Bikash Khawas =

Nepalese footballer

Personal information
- Date of birth: 29 July 2001 (age 25)
- Place of birth: Sundar Haraicha, Morang, Nepal
- Height: 1.77 m (5 ft 9 1/2 in)
- Position: Right-back

Team information
- Current team: Tribhuvan Army Club

Senior career*
Years	Team	Apps	(Gls)
2015-	Tribhuvan Army Club		
2021 (Draft)	F.C. Chitwan		

International career^{‡}
2015	Nepal U16		
2017	Nepal-U19		
2018-	Nepal-U23		
2020–	Nepal	11	(0)
- * Club domestic league appearances and goals as of 18:04, 05 Jun 2022 (UTC) ‡ National team caps and goals as of 18:04, 29 July 2026 (UTC)

Bikash Khawas (born July 21, 2001) is a Nepalese professional footballer who plays as a right-back for the Nepal national team. He has also played for Nepal's U-16, U-19 and U-23 teams.

== Career statistics ==
=== International ===
As of match played 31 March 2023

Appearances and goals by national team and year
National team	Year	Apps	Goals
Nepal	2020	2	0
Nepal	2021	2	0
Nepal	2022	4	0
Nepal	2023	3	0
Total		11	0
