= Lazar Arsić =

Serbian footballer (born 1991)

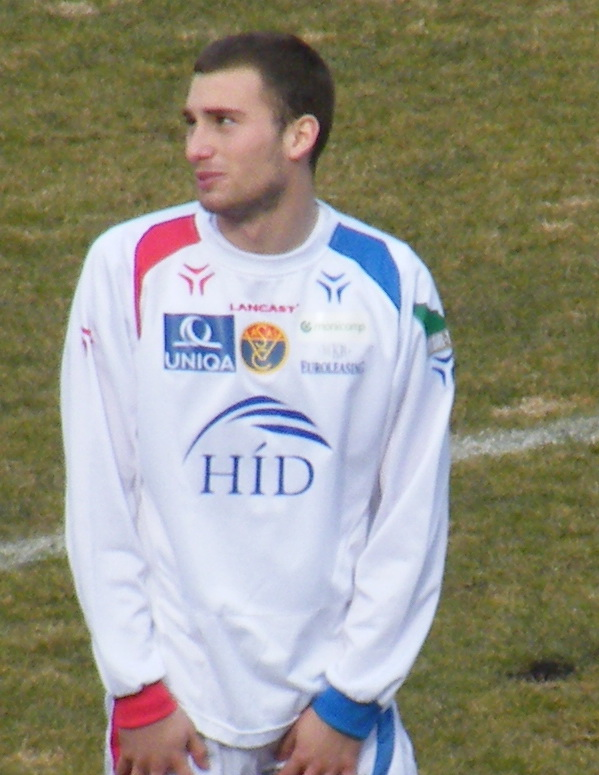

Personal information
- Date of birth: 24 September 1991 (age 35)
- Place of birth: Belgrade, SFR Yugoslavia
- Height: 1.73 m (5 ft 8 in)
- Position: Midfielder

Team information
- Current team: Jhapa FC

Youth career
- 2005–2009: Obilić

Senior career*
Years	Team	Apps	(Gls)
2009–2010	Obilić		
2010–2012	Vasas	28	(0)
2012–2014	Pápa	57	(6)
2014–2015	Radnički Kragujevac	13	(1)
2015	Apollon Smyrnis	13	(1)
2015–2016	Radnik Surdulica	29	(5)
2016–2018	Radnički Niš	56	(18)
2018–2019	Vojvodina	33	(7)
2019	Voždovac	14	(3)
2019	Meizhou Hakka	15	(1)
2020	Seoul E-Land	9	(0)
2021	Voždovac	12	(2)
2021–2022	Radnički Niš	25	(2)
2022–2023	Mladost GAT	20	(0)
2023–2024	Racing Beirut	13	(1)
2025	Jhapa FC	6	(1)
- * Club domestic league appearances and goals as of 19 April 2025

Lazar Arsić (Serbian Cyrillic: Лазар Арсић; born 24 September 1991) is a Serbian professional footballer who plays as a midfielder.

== Career ==
Born in Belgrade, Arsić began his career in FK Obilić. On 13 August 2010, he signed for Hungarian club Vasas SC. After a year and a half, he moved to another Hungarian club, Lombard-Pápa TFC.

In summer 2014, he returned to Serbia and joined top-level side FK Radnički 1923. After stints with Greek club Apollon Smyrnis, and Serbian Radnik Surdulica, Arsić settled in Radnički Niš, where he established himself as one of the top players in the club.

On 9 February 2018, Arsić signed one-and-a-half-year deal with Vojvodina. On 3 February 2019, Arsić signed one-and-a-half-year deal with Voždovac. On 9 February 2020, Arsić joined Seoul E-Land FC. On 20 August 2021, he returned to Radnički Niš.

In July 2023, joined Lebanese Premier League club Racing Beirut.

== Career statistics ==
As of 9 May 2023

Club	Season	League			Cup		Continental		Other		Total	
Club	Season	Division	Apps	Goals	Apps	Goals	Apps	Goals	Apps	Goals	Apps	Goals
Vasas	2010–11	NB I	22	0	2	0	—		—		24	0
Vasas	2011–12	NB I	6	0	1	0	—		—		7	0
Vasas	Total		28	0	3	0	0	0	0	0	31	0
Pápa	2011–12	NB I	13	0	—		—		—		13	2
Pápa	2012–13	NB I	26	1	1	0	—		—		27	1
Pápa	2013–14	NB I	18	5	3	1	—		—		21	6
Pápa	Total		57	6	4	1	0	0	0	0	61	8
Radnički Kragujevac	2014–15	Serbian SuperLiga	13	1	2	1	—		—		15	2
Apollon Smyrnis	2014–15	Football League	13	1	5	1	—		—		18	2
Radnik Surdulica	2015–16	Serbian SuperLiga	29	5	1	0	—		—		30	5
Radnički Niš	2016–17	Serbian SuperLiga	35	11	1	0	—		—		36	11
Radnički Niš	2017–18	Serbian SuperLiga	21	7	1	0	—		—		22	7
Radnički Niš	Total		56	18	2	0	0	0	0	0	58	18
Vojvodina	2017–18	Serbian SuperLiga	13	5	1	0	—		—		14	5
Vojvodina	2018–19	Serbian SuperLiga	20	2	1	1	—		—		21	3
Vojvodina	Total		33	7	2	1	0	0	0	0	35	8
Voždovac	2018–19	Serbian SuperLiga	15	3	—		—		—		15	3
Meizhou Hakka	2019	China League One	15	1	0	0	—		—		15	1
Seoul E-Land	2020	K League 2	9	0	2	1	—		—		11	1
Voždovac	2020–21	Serbian SuperLiga	12	2	1	0	—		—		13	2
Radnički Niš	2021–22	Serbian SuperLiga	24	2	2	0	—		—		26	2
Radnički Niš	2022–23	Serbian SuperLiga	1	0	—		2	0	—		3	0
Radnički Niš	Total		25	2	2	0	2	0	0	0	29	2
Mladost GAT	2022–23	Serbian SuperLiga	20	0	2	2	—		—		22	2
Career total			325	46	26	7	2	0	0	0	353	53
