= Gautam Shrestha =

Nepali footballer

Personal information
- Date of birth: 21 February 2000 (age 26)
- Place of birth: Nepal
- Height: 1.70 m (5 ft 7 in)
- Position: Defender

Team information
- Current team: Pokhara Thunders
- Number: 2

Youth career
- –2021: Jawalakhel

Senior career*
| Years | Team | Apps | (Gls) |
| 2021– | Pokhara Thunders | | |
| 2021 | → Tribhuvan Army (loan) | | |

International career^{‡}
| 2021– | Nepal | 5 | (0) |
- * Club domestic league appearances and goals as of 08:03, 15 September 2021 (UTC) ‡ National team caps and goals as of 08:03, 15 September 2021 (UTC)

Gautam Shrestha (born 21 February 2000) is a Nepali footballer who plays as a defender for Nepali club Pokhara Thunders and the Nepal national team.For part of his first season with Pokhara Thunders, he was on loan with Tribhuvan Army.
