= Futsal in Pakistan =

- Country: Pakistan
- Governing body: Pakistan Football Federation
- National teams: Men's national team Women's national team

International competitions
- FIFA Futsal World Cup AFC Futsal Asian Cup SAFF Futsal Championship

Futsal, a variant of association football, is a developing sport in Pakistan governed by the Pakistan Football Federation (PFF). Its growth is largely attributed to the availability of smaller playing spaces, such as school basketball courts, that makes the game more accessible in urban and affluent areas where standard football grounds are limited. The sport was initially overseen by the Pakistan Soccer Futsal Association, an independent body established in 2014.

== History ==
The Pakistan Football Federation initially planned to hold the first-ever National Futsal Championship in December 2010, though the event was then postponed to July 2011 and eventually cancelled altogether.

Several Pakistani teams participated in Neymar's 5 tournament in Brazil, including Peshawar's Ghosts FC in 2016 and the Chitral futsal club Highlanders FC in 2017.

In 2016, the Pakistan Soccer Futsal Federation sent an under-17 team to a tournament in Scotland. In February 2018, the Pakistan Soccer Futsal Federation organised the International Futsal Cup at the Liaquat Gymnasium in Islamabad with a field composed of foreign teams from Brazil, Turkey, Nepal, Afghanistan, in addition to two local teams, the Pakistan Greens and Pakistan Whites. The Brazilian team won the final defeating Pakistan by 12 goals to 1. The same year, the Pakistan Soccer Futsal Federation also intended to host the Asian Futsal Championship.

By the early 2020s, the Pakistan Football Federation had yet to succeed in organising futsal at the national level, despite the efforts of local clubs and departments to create separate five-a-side teams.

In 2023, the Pakistan Football Federation launched the National Futsal Cup, the first nationwide futsal competition organised under its authority. The event was structured as a five-phase regional circuit, with separate tournaments for men and women held in Lahore, Quetta, Islamabad, Peshawar, and Karachi. Each regional phase crowned its own champions: SA Gardens (men) and MRF (women) in Lahore, Hazara Quetta FC (men) and Hazara Quetta FA (women) in Quetta, Team Eighteen (men) and Smurfs (women) in Islamabad, and Forza FC (men) and Karachi City (women) in Karachi. The PFF had announced that top teams from each phase would later compete in a National Futsal Championship to determine the overall champions. However, that final stage was never held, and the competition effectively ended after the Karachi phase in April 2024.

In January 2025, the Pakistan Football Federation intended to send the first-ever women's national futsal team to the 2025 AFC Women's Futsal Asian Cup qualification but later withdrew due to financial constraints. The same year, however, the men's Pakistan national futsal team debuted at the 2026 AFC Futsal Asian Cup qualification in October 2025.

== National teams ==
- Pakistan national futsal team
- Pakistan women's national futsal team
