= Torric Jebrin =

Ghanaian footballer (born 1991)

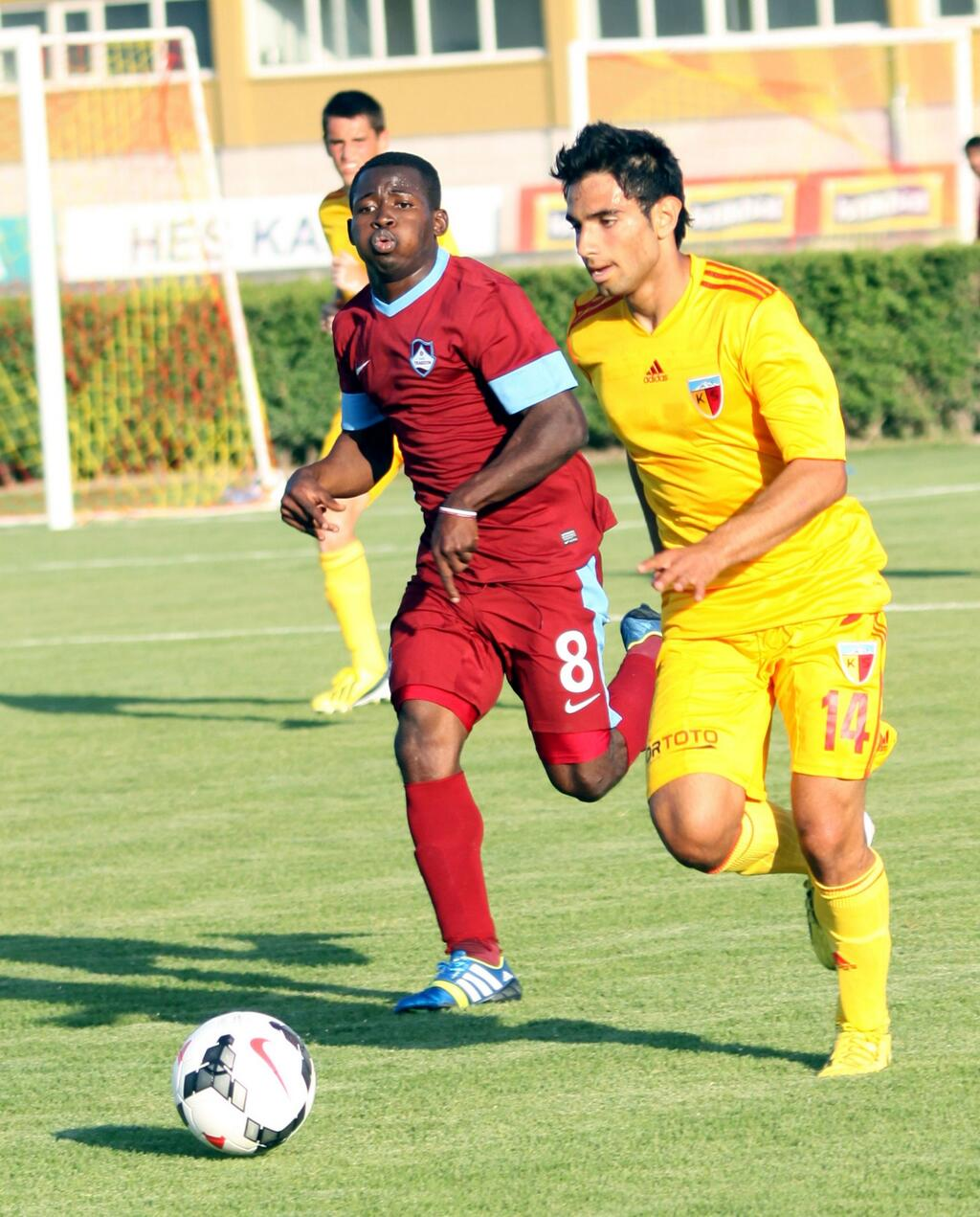

Personal information
- Full name: Torric Jebrin
- Date of birth: 14 January 1991 (age 35)
- Place of birth: Kumasi, Ashanti, Ghana
- Position: Attacking midfielder

Youth career
- Hearts of Oak

Senior career*
Years	Team	Apps	(Gls)
2008	Hearts of Oak		
2009–2011	Portsmouth	0	(0)
2009–2010	→ Zulte Waregem (loan)	0	(0)
2010–2011	→ Hearts of Oak (loan)	0	(0)
2011	Bucaspor	26	(3)
2012–2014	Trabzonspor	2	(0)
2012–2014	→ 1461 Trabzon (loan)	43	(1)
2014–2015	Bucaspor	8	(0)
2015–2017	Ismaily	65	(3)
2017	→ Al-Wehda (loan)	10	(0)
2017–2018	Arab Contractors	34	(1)
2018–2019	Al-Masry	8	(0)
2019	→ Al-Kawkab (loan)	14	(3)
2019–2020	TP Mazembe	19	(1)
2020–2021	Al-Arabi	13	(2)
2022	New Radiant S.C.	7	(5)
2022–2023	Friends Club	18	(6)
2024–2025	AS GNN		
2025	Chitwan	1	(0)

International career
	Ghana U20	1	(0)
2008	Ghana A'	1	(0)
- * Club domestic league appearances and goals

Torric Jebrin (born 14 January 1991) is a Ghanaian professional footballer who plays as an attacking midfielder; he last played for Nepal Super League club Chitwan.

== Club career ==
=== Portsmouth ===
He began his career at Hearts of Oak. On 3 November 2008 it was announced, that Jebrin had signed a three-year contract with English club Portsmouth FC, collaboration club of Hearts of Oak. Jebrin had been on several trials at the club, and during that, he was watched by Arsenal during a match. Also Chelsea, Atlético Madrid, Lyon and Inter Milan were all keen to have the player on trials, but his management did not want to masquerade the player at various club trials.

Hearts and Portsmouth FC agreed and signed papers in the matter of Jebrin transferring to Portsmouth FC via a club in Belgium from the 1st January 2009. Jebrin was entered in an educational program in Belgium and also in England, fully paid for by Portsmouth. The plan was to loan him out to a Belgian club and was later loaned out to S.V. Zulte Waregem.

=== Turkey ===
In January 2011, Jebrin signed a two and half year deal with Turkish side Bucaspor. He played for the club 26 times, scoring three goals.

In December 2011, Jebrin completed a controversial move to Trabzonspor on a free transfer after terminating his contract with Bucaspor a month earlier without justification. Bucaspor released a statement that Trabzonspor enticed the footballer in violation of transfer regulations and Bucaspor's legal board had filed a complaint with the Turkish Football Federation demanding Trabzonspor receive a transfer ban for their actions.

=== Ismaily SC ===
In 31 July Ismaily SC in Egypt announcement on sign a contract with Jebrin for 3 years on free transfer. Jebrin said that he is very happy to sign a contract with a very big club in Africa and in Arab region and Egypt.

=== TP Mazembe ===
In July 2019, Jebrin signed for Congolese team TP Mazembe on a 2-year contract. Despite a successful first match against OC Bukavu Dawa, in which he scored a goal and made two assists, his contract was cut short due to poor performance and he left the club in August 2020.

=== New Radiant S.C. ===
In July 2022, Maldivian club New Radiant S.C. announced that Jebrin would be part of their squad as the team made their comeback in the 2nd Division of the Maldivian League after 4 years of suspension sanctioned by FIFA was lifted. On the 16th of July, New Radiant S.C. unveiled Jebrin as one of their vice-captains. Jebrin scored against Club Teenage in his first match as a New Radiant S.C. Player. He bettered his performance in the next match by scoring a hat-trick within the first half against Lorenzo SC.

== International career ==
Jebrin has played for the local national team for home based players and débuted at the age of just 15 against Niger in April 2008, attempting to qualify for the first edition of the African Nations Championship, the new competition for home based African players. He also played one match for Ghana U20.

He was called up to the senior Ghana national team for the 2021 Africa Cup of Nations qualification and he was an unused substitute during the 1–0 victory against São Tomé and Príncipe on 19 November 2019.

== Personal life ==
His father Razak played for Cornerstone Kumasi.
