= Ahmad Hijazi =

Lebanese footballer (born 1994)

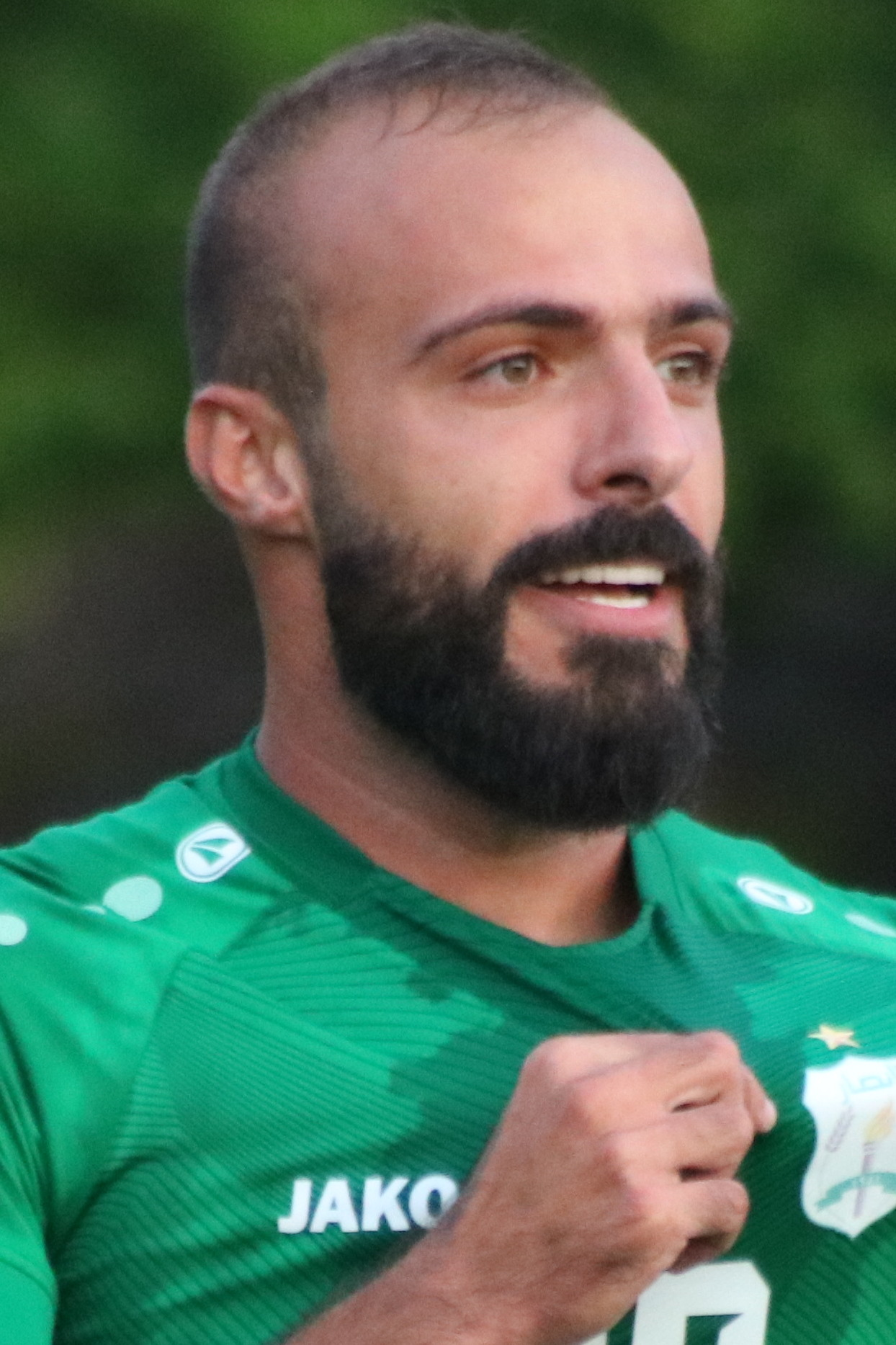
- Hijazi with Ansar in 2020

Personal information
- Full name: Ahmad Mostafa Hijazi
- Date of birth: 22 August 1994 (age 32)
- Place of birth: Sidon, Lebanon
- Height: 1.70 m (5 ft 7 in)
- Position: Forward

Team information
- Current team: Sagesse
- Number: 99

Youth career
- Ahed

Senior career*
Years	Team	Apps	(Gls)
2014–2019	Ahed	0	(0)
2014–2015	→ Racing Beirut (loan)	17	(3)
2015–2016	→ Nabi Chit (loan)	11	(2)
2016–2019	→ Akhaa Ahli Aley (loan)	61	(29)
2019–2020	Akhaa Ahli Aley	3	(2)
2020	→ Ansar (loan)	0	(0)
2020–2023	Ansar	43	(13)
2023–2024	Safa	20	(1)
2023	→ Nepal Police Club (loan)	14	(8)
2023	→ Dhangadhi (loan)	9	(2)
2024–2025	Bourj	28	(3)
2025	→ Dhangadhi (loan)	7	(5)
2026–	Sagesse	6	(2)
2026	→ Thunderbolt North United (loan)		

International career^{‡}
2019–2021	Lebanon	2	(0)
- * Club domestic league appearances and goals as of 16 June 2026 ‡ National team caps and goals as of 19:07, 23 June 2021 (UTC)

Ahmad Mostafa Hijazi (Arabic: أحمد مصطفى حجازي, Lebanese Arabic pronunciation: [ˈʕaħmad ˈħʒeːze, -zi]; born 22 August 1994) is a Lebanese professional footballer who plays as a forward for Lebanese Premier League club Sagesse.

== Club career ==
After spending three seasons on loan from Ahed—at Racing Beirut, Nabi Chit, and Akhaa Ahli Aley, respectively—Hijazi signed a permanent deal with Akhaa Ahli Aley in summer 2019. He was sent on loan to Ansar on 23 January 2020, to compete in the 2020 AFC Cup.

On 9 July 2020, Hijazi joined Ansar permanently on a five-year deal. On 24 April 2021, he helped his team win the 2020–21 Lebanese Premier League, their first league title since 2007—and 14th overall—scoring in a 2–1 win against rivals Nejmeh in the Beirut derby in the last matchday of the season. Hijazi also helped Ansar win the double, beating Nejmeh in the 2020–21 Lebanese FA Cup final on penalty shoot-outs.

On 31 March 2023, Hijazi moved to Safa. He was sent on a two-month loan to Nepal Police Club for the remainder of the 2023 Martyr's Memorial A-Division League season. Hijazi was then loaned to Dhangadhi in the 2023–24 Nepal Super League, played between November and December 2023, where he scored four goals and helped the team reach the final. Hijazi and Safa mutually agreed to terminate the contract at the end of the season.

On 29 August 2024, Hijazi moved to Bourj. He returned to Nepalese club Dhangadhi on 23 February 2025 ahead of the 2025 season, and scored a brace on 1 April 2025 against Butwal Lumbini in the opening game. He helped Dhangadhi finish third, and was crowned topscorer of the season with five goals in seven matches.

On 6 April 2025, Hijazi joined Sikkim Premier League club Thunderbolt North United.

== International career ==
Hijazi made his international debut for Lebanon on 5 August 2019, in a 0–0 draw against Palestine at the 2019 WAFF Championship.

== Style of play ==
Hijazi is a forward known for his speed.

== Career statistics ==
=== International ===
As of match played 23 June 2021

Appearances and goals by national team and year
National team	Year	Apps	Goals
Lebanon	2019	1	0
Lebanon	2020	0	0
Lebanon	2021	1	0
Total		2	0

== Honours ==
Ansar

- Lebanese Premier League: 2020–21
- Lebanese FA Cup: 2020–21; runner-up: 2021–22
- Lebanese Super Cup: 2021
- Lebanese Elite Cup runner-up: 2022

Individual

- Nepal Super League top scorer: 2025
