= Nepal national futsal team =

Nepal
- Nickname(s): The Gorkhalis
- Association: All Nepal Football Association (ANFA)
- Confederation: AFC (Asia)
- Head coach: Anil Bahadur Gurung
- Captain: Bijay Shrestha
- Top scorer: Bikrant Narsingh Rana (5 goals)
- FIFA code: NEP
- FIFA ranking: 111 ▼1 (24 September 2026)
Home colours	Away colours

First international
- Uzbekistan 14–1 Nepal (Tabriz, Iran; 15 October 2017)

Biggest win
- Turkey 0–9 Nepal (Islamabad, Pakistan; 18 February 2018)

Biggest defeat
- Uzbekistan 14–1 Nepal (Tabriz, Iran; 15 October 2017)

AMF World Cup
- Appearances: 1 (First in [[2019 AMF Futsal Men's World Cup AMF Futsal World Cup|2019 AMF Futsal Men's World Cup]])

SAFF Futsal Championship
- Appearances: 1 (First in 2026)

Confederations Cup
- Appearances: 1 (First in 2018 AFC Futsal Championship qualification)

The Nepal national futsal team represents Nepal in international futsal competitions and is controlled by the All Nepal Football Association. The current head coach for the national men's team is Anil Bahadur Gurung.

== History ==
As futsal began to gain popularity in Nepal, the ANFA formed its first-ever national team in 2017 to enter 2018 AFC Futsal Championship qualification. Former Nepal international footballer Rakesh Shrestha was selected to lead the team in qualification as its first-ever head coach. The team lost its maiden international fixture 1–14 to Uzbekistan to open their qualifying campaign. Captain Suraj Raut scored the team's only goal and the team's first-ever tally.

Nepal was invited to Pakistan in February 2018 to compete in the International Soccer Futsal Cup 2018. The tournament marked the first time that international futsal had been played in the country. In preparation for the tournament, Nep defeated the hosts 7–5 in a friendly on 13 February. In 2019, Nepal was invited to participate in the 2019 AMF Futsal Men's World Cup. The team were defeated in all three of its Group Stage matches. It was drawn into Group D along with the United States, France, and Catalonia.

When the inaugural FIFA World Futsal Rankings were released in May 2024, Nepal had an initial ranking of 121st out of 139 ranked nations.

In January 2026, Nepal participated in the inaugural SAFF Futsal Championship in Thailand.

== Coaching staff ==
=== Current coaching staff ===
As of 20 January 2026

Position	Name
Team Manager	(Nepal) Milan Adhikari
Head Coach	(Nepal) Anil Bahadur Gurung
Assistant Coach	(Nepal) Saroj Kumar Chhetri Thapa
Physio	(Nepal) Dewan Thapa
Interpreter	(Nepal) Karan Chitrakar

== Players (2026) ==
The following players were selected for 2026 SAFF Futsal Championship.

Men’s Squad: Amit Lama, Ashok Darlami, Bijay Shrestha, Bikrant Narsing Rana, Bishal Saru Magar, Dipesh Shrestha (GK), Jenish Prajapati, Lakpa Tamang, Padam Tamang (GK), Pemba Dorje Lama, Sanje Syangtan, Saroj Tamang, Subet Lama, Suraj Gurung

No.	Pos.	Player	Date of birth (age)	Caps	Goals	Club
1	GK	Padam Tamang				(All Nepal Football Association)
2		Lakpa Tamang				(All Nepal Football Association)
3		Bishal Saru Magar				(All Nepal Football Association)
4		Sanje Syangtan				(All Nepal Football Association)
5		Pemba Dorje Lama				(All Nepal Football Association)
6		Ashok Darlami				(All Nepal Football Association)
7		Amit Lama				(All Nepal Football Association)
8		Bijay Shrestha				(All Nepal Football Association)
9		Bikrant Narsingh Rana				(All Nepal Football Association)
10		Suraj Gurung				(All Nepal Football Association)
11		Jenish Prajapati				(All Nepal Football Association)
12		Subet Lama				(All Nepal Football Association)
12		Dipesh Shrestha				(All Nepal Football Association)

== All-time fixtures and results ==
=== 2017 ===
15 October 2017 2018 AFC Futsal Championship qualification	Uzbekistan	14–1	Nepal	Tabriz, Iran
		Report	Suraj Raut 22'	Stadium: Shahid Poursharifi Arena

16 October 2017 2018 AFC Futsal Championship qualification	Kyrgyzstan	5–0	Nepal	Tabriz, Iran
		Report		Stadium: Shahid Poursharifi Arena

17 October 2017 2018 AFC Futsal Championship qualification	Turkmenistan	9–3	Nepal	Tabriz, Iran
		Report	Nabin Lama 3'; Nirmal Gurung 8'; Suraj Raut 14'	Stadium: Shahid Poursharifi Arena

=== 2018 ===
13 February 2018 Friendly	Pakistan	5–7	Nepal	Islamabad, Pakistan
		Report		Stadium: Pakistan Sports Complex

16 February 2018 International Soccer Futsal Cup 2018	Pakistan	8–5	Nepal	Islamabad, Pakistan
			Subash Ghalan, Sameer Karki, Bikki Silakar	Stadium: Pakistan Sports Complex

18 February 2018 International Soccer Futsal Cup 2018	Turkey	0–9	Nepal	Islamabad, Pakistan
			Sameer Karki,, Subash Ghalan, Deependra Rasaili; Ritesh Paudel; Bikki Silakar; Bidek KC	Stadium: Pakistan Sports Complex

13 December 2018 2018 Triagular Futsal Series	Afghanistan	5–4	Nepal	Islamabad, Pakistan
				Stadium: Pakistan Sports Complex

14 December 2018 2018 Triagular Futsal Series	Pakistan	1–2	Nepal	Islamabad, Pakistan
				Stadium: Pakistan Sports Complex

=== 2019 ===
1 April 2019 2019 AMF Futsal Men's World Cup	United States	2–1	Nepal	Oberá, Argentina
		Report		Stadium: Polideportivo del Complejo Ian Barney

2 April 2019 2019 AMF Futsal Men's World Cup	France	3–2	Nepal	Oberá, Argentina
		Report		Stadium: Polideportivo del Complejo Ian Barney

3 April 2019 2019 AMF Futsal Men's World Cup	Catalonia	11–1	Nepal	Oberá, Argentina
		Report	Sujan Balami	Stadium: Polideportivo del Complejo Ian Barney

23 October 2019 2020 AFC Futsal Championship qualification	Tajikistan	6–0	Nepal	Urmia, Iran
		Report		Stadium: Ghadir Arena

24 October 2019 2020 AFC Futsal Championship qualification	Uzbekistan	4–1	Nepal	Urmia, Iran
		Report	Mani Kumar Lama 39'	Stadium: Ghadir Arena

25 October 2019 2020 AFC Futsal Championship qualification	Afghanistan	6–2	Nepal	Urmia, Iran
		Report	Aadil Hamid 6'; Mani Kumar Lama 16'	Stadium: Ghadir Arena

=== 2022 ===
10 April 2022 2022 AFC Futsal Asian Cup qualification	Uzbekistan	5–1	Nepal	Bishkek, Kyrgyzstan
		Report	Mani Kumar Lama 28'	Stadium: Gazprom Sports Complex

11 April 2022 2022 AFC Futsal Asian Cup qualification	Tajikistan	11–1	Nepal	Bishkek, Kyrgyzstan
		Report	Aadil Hamid 3'	Stadium: Gazprom Sports Complex

12 April 2022 2022 AFC Futsal Asian Cup qualification	Afghanistan	8–1	Nepal	Bishkek, Kyrgyzstan
		Report	Sumit Shrestha 39'	Stadium: Gazprom Sports Complex

=== 2023 ===
7 October 2023 2024 AFC Futsal Asian Cup qualification	South Korea	5–1	Nepal	Ulaanbaatar, Mongolia
		Report	Sumit Shrestha 21'	Stadium: Buyant Ukhaa Sport Palace

9 October 2023 2024 AFC Futsal Asian Cup qualification	Vietnam	5–0	Nepal	Ulaanbaatar, Mongolia
		Report		Stadium: Buyant Ukhaa Sport Palace

11 October 2023 2024 AFC Futsal Asian Cup qualification	Mongolia	1–1	Nepal	Ulaanbaatar, Mongolia
17:00		Report	Sumit Shrestha 11'	Stadium: Buyant Ukhaa Sport Palace

=== 2026 ===
16 January 2026 2026 SAFF Futsal Championship	Sri Lanka	1-2	Nepal	Bangkok, Thailand
	MOHAMED KURSHEETH MOHAMED SHAJAAN 10'	Report	SAROJ TAMANG 15', 21'	Stadium: Nonthaburi Province Stadium; Referee: Chonlakan Luangsa-Ard (Thailand); Fourth official: Vaja Vishal Mahendrabhai (India); Man of the Match: Saroj Tamang

18 January 2026 2026 SAFF Futsal Championship	India	3-3	Nepal	Bangkok, Thailand
	Laltluangzela 6' Anmol Adhikari 29' Nikhil Rajendra Mali 40'	Report	Bikrant Narsingh Rana 2' Amit Lama 25' Bijay Shrestha 40'	Stadium: Nonthaburi Province Stadium; Referee: Ali Ahmadi (Iran); Fourth official: Nattakit Hintua (Thailand); Man of the Match: Bikrant Narsingh Rana

20 January 2026 2026 SAFF Futsal Championship	Pakistan	4-4	Nepal	Bangkok, Thailand
	Muhammad Ellham 25'; Nisar Hussain 33'; Asif Ahmad Chaudhry 34'; Muhammad Hassaan Zafar Khan 37'	Report	Bikrant Narsingh Rana 1', 19'; Jenish Prajapti 24'; Suraj Gurung 32'	Stadium: Nonthaburi Province Stadium; Referee: Benjapol Mucharoennsap (Thailand); Fourth official: Chris Sinclair (New Zealand); Man of the Match: Nisar Husain

22 January 2026 2026 SAFF Futsal Championship	Maldives	2-1	Nepal	Bangkok, Thailand
	Abdulla Shafiu 23'; Mohamed Imran 33'	Report	Bikrant Narsingh Rana 24'	Stadium: Nonthaburi Province Stadium; Referee: Ali Hafizi (Iran); Fourth official: Nicholas Backo (Australia); Man of the Match: Ahmed Hameed

24 January 2026 2026 SAFF Futsal Championship	Bangladesh	1-4	Nepal	Bangkok, Thailand
	Rahbar Khan 34'	Report	Lakpa Tamang 14'; Saroj Tamang 29'; Sanje Syangtan 35'; Bikrant Narsingh Rana 37'	Stadium: Nonthaburi Province Stadium; Referee: Khampasong Xayavongsy (Loas); Fourth official: Mohammad Javed Ehtesham (Iran); Man of the Match: Lakpa Tamang

26 January 2026 2026 SAFF Futsal Championship	Bhutan	1–4	Nepal	Bangkok, Thailand
12:45 NST	Jetsuen Dorji 16'	Report	Bijay Shrestha 21'; Pemba Dorje Lama 25', 31'; Saroj Tamang 38'	Stadium: Nonthaburi Stadium; Attendance: 58; Referee: Ali Hafizi (Iran)

As of 24 January 2026

=== Results By Years ===
Year	M	W	D	L	GF	GA	GD	Ref
2017	3	0	0	3	4	28	-24	
2018	Did Not Compete							
2019	3	0	0	3	3	16	-13	
2020	Did Not Compete							
2021	Did Not Compete							
2022	3	0	0	3	3	24	-21	
2023	3	0	1	2	2	11	-9	
2024	Did Not Compete							
2025	0	0	0	0	0	0	0	
Total	12	0	1	11	12	79	-67	

- All of 2018 and 2019 AMF Futsal Men's World Cup results is unofficial.

== Players 2024 ==
The following players were called up for 2024 AFC Futsal Asian Cup qualification.

- Goalkeeper: Padam Tamang, Aashish Dangal, Sagar Gurung
- Fixo: Bijay Shrestha, Saroj Tamang, Sanje Syangtan
- Ala: Aadil Hamid, Amit Tamang, Aruj Singh, Sumit Shrestha, Ujwol Shahi, Rajat Tiwari, Dipesh Ghale
- Pivot: Sujit Budathoki, Mani Kumar Lama

== Competitive record ==
=== FIFA Futsal World Cup ===
FIFA Futsal World Cup Record
Year	Round	Position	Pld	W	D	L	GS	GA
(Netherlands) 1989	Did not enter							
(Hong Kong) 1992	Did not enter							
(Spain) 1996	Did not enter							
(Guatemala) 2000	Did not enter							
(Chinese Taipei) 2004	Did not enter							
(Brazil) 2008	Did not enter							
(Thailand) 2012	Did not enter							
(Colombia) 2016	Did not enter							
2021	did not qualify							
(Uzbekistan) 2024	did not qualify							
Total	0/10	N/A	0	0	0	0	0	0

=== AFC Futsal Asian Cup ===
AFC Futsal Asian Cup Record
Year	Round	Position	Pld	W	D	L	GS	GA
1999	did not enter							
2000	did not enter							
2001	did not enter							
2002	did not enter							
2003	did not enter							
2004	did not enter							
2005	did not enter							
2006	did not enter							
2007	did not enter							
2008	did not enter							
2010	did not enter							
2012	did not enter							
2014	did not enter							
2016	did not enter							
2018	did not qualify							
2022	did not qualify							
2024	did not qualify							
Total	N/A	0/16	0	0	0	0	0	0

=== AMF Futsal World Cup ===
Year	Round	Position	Pld	W	D*	L	GF	GA
(Brazil) 1982	did not Enter							
(Spain) 1985	did not Enter							
(Australia) 1988	did not Enter							
(Italy) 1991	did not Enter							
(Argentina) 1994	did not Enter							
(Mexico) 1997	did not Enter							
(Bolivia) 2000	did not Enter							
(Paraguay) 2003	did not Enter							
(Argentina) 2007	did not Enter							
(Colombia) 2011	did not Enter							
(Belarus) 2015	did not Enter							
(Argentina) 2019	Group Stage	14th	3	0	0	3	4	16
(Mexico) 2023	did not Enter							
Total	Group Stage	1/13	3	0	0	3	4	16

=== SAFF Futsal Championship ===
SAFF Futsal Championship records
Host/Year	Round	Position	GP	W	D	L	GF	GA
(Thailand) 2026	Group stage	3rd	6	3	2	1	18	12
Total	1/1	0 Title	6	3	2	1	18	12

== Head-to-head record ==
Key
More wins
Equal wins/losses ratio
More losses

Nepal national futsal team head-to-head records
Opponent	From	To	Pld	W	D	L	GF	GA	GD	Confederation
Afghanistan	2018	2022	3	0	0	3	7	19	—12	AFC
Bangladesh	2026	2026	1	1	0	0	4	1	+3	AFC
Bhutan	2026	2026	1	1	0	0	4	1	+3	AFC
Catalonia	2019	2019	1	0	0	1	1	11	—10	UEFA
France	2019	2019	1	0	0	1	2	3	—1	UEFA
India	2026	2026	1	0	1	0	3	3	0	AFC
Kyrgyzstan	2017	2017	1	0	0	1	0	5	—5	AFC
Maldives	2026	2026	1	0	0	1	1	2	—1	AFC
Mongolia	2023	2023	1	0	1	0	1	1	0	AFC
Pakistan	2018	2026	4	2	1	1	18	19	0	AFC
South Korea	2023	2023	1	0	0	1	1	5	—4	AFC
Sri Lanka	2026	2026	1	1	0	0	2	1	+1	AFC
Tajikistan	2019	2022	2	0	0	2	1	17	—16	AFC
Turkmenistan	2017	2017	1	0	0	1	3	9	—6	AFC
Turkey	2018	2018	1	1	0	0	9	0	+9	UEFA
United States	2019	2019	1	0	0	1	1	2	—1	CONCACAF(North America)
Uzbekistan	2017	2022	3	0	0	3	3	23	—20	AFC
Vietnam	2023	2023	1	0	0	1	0	5	—5	AFC
Total	2017	2026	26	6	3	17	61	127	—66	FIFA
Last match updated was against Bhutan on 26 January 2026.
