= Pakistan national futsal team =

Pakistan
- Shirt badge/Association crest
- Nickname(s): Shaheens (شاہین) (The Falcons)
- Association: Pakistan Football Federation (PFF)
- Confederation: AFC (Asia); SAFF (South Asia)
- Head coach: Ali Imani
- FIFA code: PAK
- FIFA ranking: 138 (24 September 2026)
Home colours	Away colours

First international
- Pakistan 1–8 Iraq (Dammam, Saudi Arabia; 18 October 2025)

Biggest win
- Bangladesh 1–5 Pakistan (Bangkok, Thailand; 22 January 2026)

Biggest defeat
- Saudi Arabia 13–0 Pakistan (Dammam, Saudi Arabia; 20 October 2025)

FIFA World Cup
- Appearances: 0

AFC Asia Cup
- Appearances: 0

SAFF Futsal Championship
- Appearances: 1 (First in 2026)

The Pakistan national futsal team represents Pakistan in international futsal competitions. The team is controlled by the Pakistan Football Federation (PFF) as member of the Asian Football Confederation (AFC).

== History ==
The Pakistan national futsal team was formed in 2025 when Pakistan participated in the 2026 AFC Futsal Asian Cup qualifiers for the first time. Their opponents included Iraq, Saudi Arabia and Chinese Taipei. The first ever team was formed through trials and with Sakhawat Ali as head coach.

== Players ==
=== Current squad ===
The following players were named for 2026 AFC Futsal Asian Cup qualification.

== Results and fixtures ==
The following is a list of match results in the last 12 months, as well as any future matches that have been scheduled.

Legend

Win Draw Lose Fixture

=== 2026 ===
14 January 2026 2026 SAFF Men's Futsal Championship	Maldives	7–1	Pakistan	Nonthaburi, Thailand
				Stadium: Nonthaburi Stadium

16 January 2026 2026 SAFF Men's Futsal Championship	Pakistan	4–2	Bhutan	Nonthaburi, Thailand
				Stadium: Nonthaburi Stadium

18 January 2026 2026 SAFF Men's Futsal Championship	Pakistan	5–2	Sri Lanka	Nonthaburi, Thailand
				Stadium: Nonthaburi Stadium

20 January 2026 2026 SAFF Men's Futsal Championship	Pakistan	4–4	Nepal	Nonthaburi, Thailand
				Stadium: Nonthaburi Stadium

22 January 2026 2026 SAFF Men's Futsal Championship	Bangladesh	1–5	Pakistan	Nonthaburi, Thailand
				Stadium: Nonthaburi Stadium

24 January 2026 2026 SAFF Men's Futsal Championship	India	4–1	Pakistan	Nonthaburi, Thailand
				Stadium: Nonthaburi Stadium

== Tournament history ==
=== FIFA Futsal World Cup ===
FIFA Futsal World Cup records
Year	Round	Position	GP	W	D	L	GF	GA
(Netherlands) 1989	Did not participate							
(Hong Kong) 1992	Did not participate							
(Spain) 1996	Did not participate							
(Guatemala) 2000	Did not participate							
(Taiwan) 2004	Did not participate							
(Brazil) 2008	Did not participate							
(Thailand) 2012	Did not participate							
(Colombia) 2016	Did not participate							
(Lithuania) 2021	Did not participate							
(Uzbekistan) 2024	Did not participate							
Total	0/10	0	0	0	0	0	0	0

=== AFC Futsal Asian Cup ===
AFC Futsal Asian Cup records
Year	Round	Position	GP	W	D	L	GF	GA
(Malaysia) 1999	Did not participate							
(Thailand) 2000	Did not participate							
(Iran) 2001	Did not participate							
(Indonesia) 2002	Did not participate							
(Iran) 2003	Did not participate							
(Macau) 2004	Did not participate							
(Vietnam) 2005	Did not participate							
(Uzbekistan) 2006	Did not participate							
(Japan) 2007	Did not participate							
(Thailand) 2008	Did not participate							
(Uzbekistan) 2010	Did not participate							
(United Arab Emirates) 2012	Did not participate							
(Vietnam) 2014	Did not participate							
(Uzbekistan) 2016	Did not participate							
(Taiwan) 2018	Did not participate							
(Turkmenistan) 2020	Did not participate							
(Kuwait) 2022	Did not participate							
(Thailand) 2024	Did not participate							
(Indonesia) 2026	Did not qualify							
Total	0/18	0	0	0	0	0	0	0

=== AFC Futsal Asian Cup qualification ===
AFC Futsal Asian Cup qualification records
Year	Round	Position	GP	W	D	L	GF	GA
2014	Did not participate							
2016	Did not participate							
2018	Did not participate							
2020	Did not participate							
2022	Did not participate							
2024	Did not participate							
(Malaysia) 2026	Group Stage	4th	3	0	0	3	1	25
Total	N/A	N/A	3	0	0	3	1	25

=== SAFF Futsal Championship ===
SAFF Futsal Championship records
Host/Year	Round	Position	GP	W	D	L	GF	GA
(Thailand) 2026	Round-robin	4th	6	3	1	2	21	28
Total	—	4th	6	3	1	2	21	28

== Head-to-head records ==
The following table shows Pakistan's head-to-head records against all opponents.

As of 24 January 2026

Opponent	GP	W	D	L	GF	GA	GD	Win %
Iraq	1	0	0	1	1	8	−7	0.00
Saudi Arabia	1	0	0	1	0	6	−6	0.00
Chinese Taipei	1	0	0	1	1	4	−3	0.00
Maldives	1	0	0	1	1	7	−6	0.00
Bhutan	1	1	0	0	4	2	+2	100.00
Sri Lanka	1	1	0	0	5	2	+3	100.00
Nepal	1	0	1	0	4	4	+0	0.00
Bangladesh	1	1	0	0	5	1	+4	100.00
India	1	0	0	1	1	4	−3	0.00
Total	9	3	1	5	22	38	−16	33.33

== Coaching history ==
As of 24 January 2026

Head coach	Country	Period	P	W	D	L	Win %
Sakhawat Ali	Pakistan	2025	3	0	0	3	0.00
Ali Imani	Iran	2026–present	6	3	1	2	50.00

== See also ==
- Futsal in Pakistan
