= Jeffrey Baltus =

French footballer (born 1991)

Personal information
- Date of birth: 20 December 1991 (age 34)
- Place of birth: Melun, France
- Height: 1.86 m (6 ft 1 in)
- Position: Goalkeeper

Team information
- Current team: Völsungur
- Number: 22

Senior career*
Years	Team	Apps	(Gls)
2011–2014	AJ Auxerre	0	(0)
2011–2014	→ AJ Auxerre 2 (loan)	39	(0)
2014–2015	US Ivry	15	(0)
2015–2017	CA Bastia	34	(0)
2018	RFC Liège		
2018–2019	RCO Agde	21	(0)
2019–2020	US Granville	1	(0)
2020–2023	FC Rouen	25	(0)
2023	Lalitpur City	8	(0)
2024–2025	RSSG S/M	8	(0)
2025	Lalitpur City	4	(0)
2025	Paro	4	(0)
2026	Völsungur	2	(0)
- * Club domestic league appearances and goals as of 1 July 2026

Jeffrey Baltus (born 20 December 1991) is a French professional footballer who plays as a goalkeeper.

== Early life ==
Baltus was born in 1991 in France. He joined the youth academy of French side AJ Auxerre at under-15 level.

== Career ==
Baltus started his career with French Ligue 1 side AJ Auxerre. He was described as "undefeated in five CFA2 matches" during the 2013–14 season while playing for the club'. In 2014, he signed for French side US Ivry. In 2015, he signed for French side CA Bastia. In 2018, he signed for Belgian side RFC Liège. After that, he signed for French side RCO Agde. In 2019, he signed for French side US Granville. In 2020, he signed for French side FC Rouen. He was regarded to have performed well for the club. In 2023, he signed for Nepali side Lalitpur City FC. He helped the club win the league. In October 2024, he joined Belgian National Division 1 club Royal Stockay Saint-Georges-sur-Meuse.

== Personal life ==
Baltus is of Martiniquais descent. He is a native of Melun, France.
