= Mani Kumar Lama =

Nepali footballer (born 1996)

Mani Lama
Personal information
- Full name: Mani Kumar Lama
- Date of birth: 24 March 1996 (age 30)
- Place of birth: Kathmandu, Nepal
- Height: 1.75 m (5 ft 9 in)
- Position: Midfielder

Team information
- Current team: Paro

Senior career*
Years	Team	Apps	(Gls)
2019–2023	Nepal A.P.F.		
2023–2024	→ Butwal Lumbini (loan)	7	(0)
2025	→ Lalitpur City (loan)	7	(1)
2025	→ Paro (loan)	0	(0)

International career^{‡}
2019–2022	Nepal (futsal)	9	(3)
2024–	Nepal	15	(0)
- * Club domestic league appearances and goals as of 1 February 2026 ‡ National team caps and goals as of 1 February 2026

Mani Kumar Lama (Nepali: मणिकुमार लामा; born 24 March 1996) is a Nepalese professional footballer who plays as a midfielder. He is also a member of the Nepal national team.

== Early career ==
He began training with Purshottam Bajracharya, a former Nepali national table tennis player. At 14, he made the junior national table tennis team in 2010. In 2012, he won two silver medals for Nepal in the South Asian Championship. The following year, he competed in the World Cup Junior Cadet and Youth Asian Games. In 2016, he won bronze in men's singles at the 8th National Games for Tribhuvan Army Club.

Lama represented the Nepal's national futsal team during the qualifiers for the AFC Futsal Asian Cup in both 2019 and 2022, scoring three goals in nine games over four years. In 2018, he joined the departmental table tennis team of Nepal A.P.F. Club. However, in 2019, after being selected for the national futsal team, he fully focused on futsal. Eventually, at the age of 22 he officially began training with the football team of Nepal A.P.F. Club.

== Club career ==
In 2019, he made his debut in the Martyr's Memorial A-Division League, representing Nepal A.P.F. Club. In 2021, he played an integral role in the club's Aaha! Gold Cup and Birat Gold Cup triumphs. In the first five matches of the 2023 Martyr's Memorial A-Division League, he scored two goals and was announced player of the match in one of the games, after which he was called to the Nepal national football team.

== International career ==
On 22 March 2023, Lama made his Nepal national team debut as a 73rd-minute substitute during a 2–1 victory over Laos in the Prime Minister's Three Nations Cup.

== Honours ==
Nepal A.P.F. Club

- Aaha! Gold Cup: 2021
- Birat Gold Cup: 2021

Nepal

- Prime Minister's Three Nations Cup: 2003
