= Papa Ibou Kébé =

French footballer (born 1989)

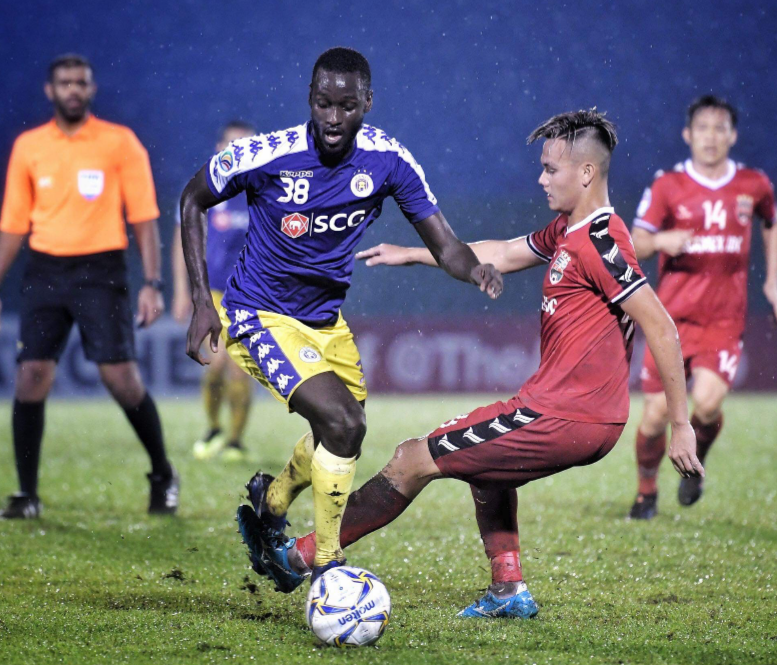
- Ibou Kebe (in blue) with Hanoi in 2019

Personal information
- Date of birth: 10 December 1989 (age 36)
- Place of birth: Strasbourg, France
- Height: 1.85 m (6 ft 1 in)
- Position: Forward

Team information
- Current team: Planning Boyz United
- Number: 20

Senior career*
Years	Team	Apps	(Gls)
2010–2013	ASPV Strasbourg		
2013–2015	Colmar	29	(5)
2013–2015	→ Colmar II	25	(7)
2015–2016	Mulhouse	20	(9)
2016–2017	Le Mans	18	(4)
2017–2018	Anagennisi Deryneia	26	(14)
2018–2019	Tabor Sežana	25	(24)
2019–2020	Hanoi	14	(5)
2020	→ Quang Nam (loan)	14	(6)
2021	SHB Da Nang	8	(1)
2021	Saigon		
2022–2023	Colmar	18	(10)
2023	Lalitpur City F.C.	10	(3)
2023–2024	Haguenau	9	(2)
2024–2025	FCOSK 06	9	(4)
2025	Lalitpur City F.C.	6	(2)
2025–2026	Südstern Singen	10	(4)
- * Club domestic league appearances and goals

Papa Ibou Kébé (born 10 December 1989) is a French professional footballer who plays as a forward.

== Career ==
Papa Ibou Kébé started his senior career with ASPV Strasbourg in 2010. In 2019, he signed for Hanoi in the Vietnamese V.League 1, where he has made thirteen appearances and scored two goals in the 2019 season. Before that, he played for French clubs Colmar, Mulhouse and Le Mans, Cypriot club Anagennisi Deryneia, and Slovenian club Tabor Sežana.

In Season 2018-2019 Papa Ibou Kébé got Slovenian Second League Top Scorer with 24 goals for Tabor Sežana.

In July 2019, Vietnamese giant club Hanoi FC signed Kébé as an injury replacement of Ganiyu Oseni and played remaining half season of V.League and AFC Cup. It was an impressive season for Kebe as Hanoi won the League, Vietnamese National Football Cup and reached semi final of AFC Cup. On 30 October 2019, Ibou Kebe scored 1 goal and gave an assist in the Final of Vietnamese Cup against Quảng Nam. Hanoi won Vietnamese cup and Kebe was awarded with man of the match for his splendid performance. In 2020, Hanoi played Vietnamese National Football Super Cup against Ho Chi Minh City and won 2–1. In 2020, Kebe signed with another Vietnamese club Quảng Nam for one season, on loan from Hanoi.

== Honours ==
=== Club ===
Anagennisi Deryneia

- Cypriot Second Division:

(silver) Runners-up : 2017–18

Tabor Sežana

- Slovenian Second League:

(silver) Runners-up : 2018–19

Hanoi FC

- V.League 1:

(gold) Winners : 2019

- Vietnamese National Cup:

(gold) Winners : 2019

- Vietnamese Super Cup:

(gold) Winners : 2019
