= Nawayug Shrestha =

Nepalese footballer

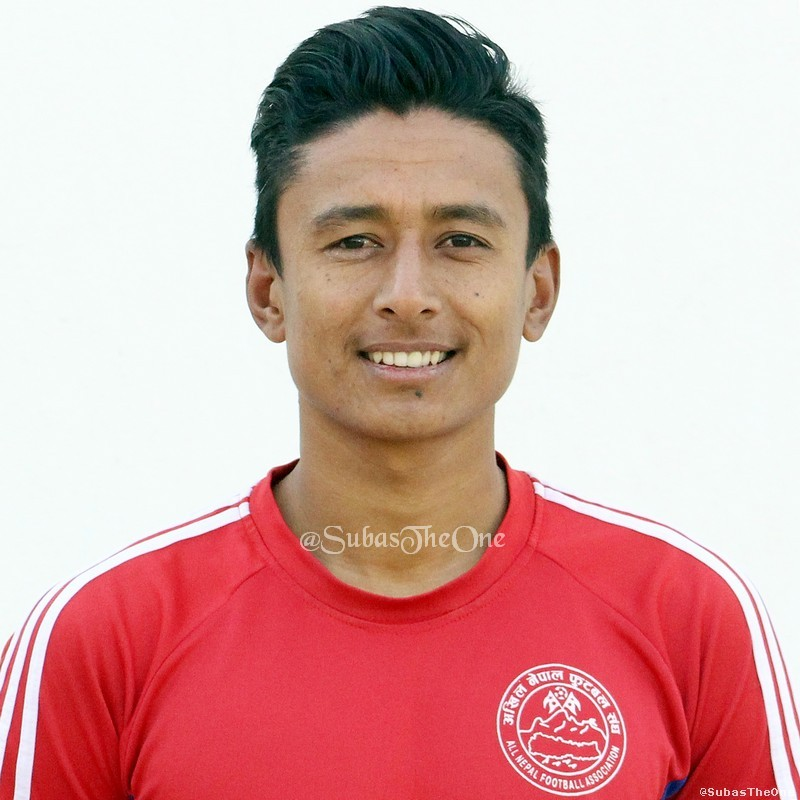

Personal information
- Full name: Nawayug Shrestha
- Date of birth: 8 June 1990 (age 36)
- Place of birth: Ilam, Nepal
- Height: 1.67 m (5 ft 6 in)
- Position: Midfielder

Team information
- Current team: Pokhara Thunders
- Number: 18

Senior career*
Years	Team	Apps	(Gls)
2015–2018	Nepal Army	79	(28)
2018	Paro		
2018–2021	Nepal Army		
2021	→ Pokhara Thunders (loan)		
2021–2022	Nepal Army		
2022	Dhangadhi		
2023–2024	Chitwan	7	(0)
2024	Nepal Army		
2024-25	Pokhara Thunders		

International career^{‡}
2014–	Nepal	54	(10)
Medal record
Men's football
Representing Nepal
SAFF Championship
Runner-up	2021 Maldives
AFC Solidarity Cup
Winner	2016
South Asian Games
Gold medal – first place	2016 India
- * Club domestic league appearances and goals ‡ National team caps and goals as of 21 June 2024

Nawayug Shrestha (born 8 June 1990) is a Nepalese international footballer who plays as a midfielder for Pokhara Thunders and the Nepal national football team.

== Personal life ==
He has been married to his wife Puja since January 31, 2024.

== International career ==
Shrestha made his international debut against India in the 2016 SAFF Championship. He scored his first international hat-trick against Maldives during the semi-final of the Bangabandhu Cup which was held in Bangladesh. He got his second hat-trick against Maldives during the South Asian Games in 2016. He increased his hat-trick tally to 3 against Bhutan in the same tournament. He also scored the winning goal against India in the finals.

== International goals ==
Scores and results list Nepal's goal tally first.

No	Date	Venue	Opponent	Score	Result	Competition
1.	19 January 2016	Bangabandhu National Stadium, Dhaka, Bangladesh	Maldives	1–0	4–1	2016 Bangabandhu Cup
2.	19 January 2016	Bangabandhu National Stadium, Dhaka, Bangladesh	Maldives	2–0	4–1	2016 Bangabandhu Cup
3.	19 January 2016	Bangabandhu National Stadium, Dhaka, Bangladesh	Maldives	4–1	4–1	2016 Bangabandhu Cup
4.	8 November 2016	Sarawak Stadium, Kuching, Malaysia	Brunei	1–0	3–0	2016 AFC Solidarity Cup
5.	27 March 2018	Suheim bin Hamad Stadium, Doha, Qatar	Yemen	1–1	1–2	2019 AFC Asian Cup qualification
6.	6 September 2018	Bangabandhu National Stadium, Dhaka, Bangladesh	Bangladesh	2–0	2–0	2018 SAFF Championship
7.	3 June 2021	Jaber Al-Ahmad International Stadium, Kuwait City, Kuwait	Chinese Taipei	2–0	2–0	2022 FIFA World Cup qualification
8.	22 March 2023	Dasarath Stadium, Kathmandu, Nepal	Laos	2–0	2–0	2023 Prime Minister's Three Nations Cup
