= Pujan Uparkoti =

Nepali footballer

Personal information
- Date of birth: 9 May 1996 (age 30)
- Place of birth: Nepal
- Height: 1.75 m (5 ft 9 in)
- Position: Midfielder

Team information
- Current team: Dhangadhi
- Number: 15

Senior career*
Years	Team	Apps	(Gls)
2019–2021	Manang Marshyangdi		
2021–	Dhangadhi		

International career^{‡}
2020–	Nepal	16	(0)
- * Club domestic league appearances and goals as of 12:52, 14 August 2022 (UTC) ‡ National team caps and goals as of 12:52, 14 August 2021 (UTC)

Pujan Uparkoti (born 9 May 1996) is a Nepalese footballer who plays as a midfielder for Nepali club Dhangadhi and the Nepal national team. In his senior career, he has also played for Manang Marshyangdi.
