= Ajit Bhandari =

Nepalese footballer

Personal information
- Date of birth: 7 February 1994 (age 32)
- Place of birth: Pokhara, Nepal
- Height: 1.70 m (5 ft 7 in)
- Position: Defender

Team information
- Current team: Nepal Police Club
- Number: 32

Youth career
- Sahara Club

Senior career*
Years	Team	Apps	(Gls)
- Nepal Police Club

International career^{‡}
- Nepal U23
2019–	Nepal	6	(0)
- * Club domestic league appearances and goals ‡ National team caps and goals as of 22:03, 30 March 2021 (UTC)

Ajit Bhandari (Nepali: अजित भण्डारी; born 7 February 1994) is a Nepalese footballer who plays as a defender for Nepal Police Club and the Nepal national team.

== International career ==
Bhandari made his international debut in a goalless friendly draw against Kuwait on 21 March 2019. He earned a yellow card in the match.

== International statistics ==
As of match played 5 September 2021.

National team	Year	Apps	Goals
Nepal	2019	5	0
Nepal	2020	1	0
Total		6	0

== Honours ==
=== Club ===
Nepal Police Club

- Aaha! Gold Cup: 2018

=== Individual ===
- Aaha! Gold Cup Best Defender: 2018
