= George Prince Karki =

Nepalese footballer and army officer

Captain George Prince Karki
- Born: George Prince Karki; 26 October 1993 (age 33); Dhulikhel, Kavrepalanchok District, Nepal
- Military career
- Allegiance: Nepal
- Branch: Nepali Army
- Service years: 2014-present
- Rank: Captain
Association football career
- Height: 1.79 m (5 ft 10 in)
- Position: Forward
Team information
- Current team: Nepal Army Club
- Number: 10
Senior career*
Years	Team	Apps	(Gls)
2015-	Nepal Army Club	90	(25)
2021	F.C. Chitwan (draft)	5	(1)
International career^{‡}
2017-	Nepal	7	(0)
- * Club domestic league appearances and goals as of 12:14, 7 January 2021 (UTC) ‡ National team caps and goals as of 12:14, 7 January 2021 (UTC)

George Prince Karki (born 26 October 1993) is a Nepalese international footballer who plays as a forward for the Nepal national football team. He is a captain in the Nepali Army and also plays for the Nepal Army Club team. In September 2017, Karki was called up to the national team for the first time, replacing Anil Gurung.
