= Jhapa FC =

Nepali football club

Jhapa
- Full name: Jhapa Football Club
- Nickname: The Elephants
- Founded: 2 January 2011; 15 years ago
- Ground: Domalal Rajbanshi Ground
- Capacity: 10,000
- President: Arpan Bikram Khadka
- Head coach: Prabesh Katuwal
- League: Nepal Super League
- Website: jhapafc.com
Home colours	Away colours	Third colours

Jhapa Football Club is a Nepali professional franchise football club based in Jhapa District. The club currently competes in the Nepal Super League, the top flight of football in Nepal.

== History ==
They were announced as one of the new franchises in the second edition in 2022. Jhapa FC have been a popular football club from eastern Nepal. Jhapa selected Anjan Bista as their Marquee Player for their maiden NSL campaign. They play their home matches in Domalal Rajbanshi Ground, in Jhapa district.

== Logo ==
Club logo used until the 2025 season
