= Pokhara Thunders =

- Full name: Pokhara Thunders
- Nickname: The Thunders
- Founded: 2021; 5 years ago
- Ground: Pokhara Rangasala Stadium
- Capacity: 18,500
- Owner: Laxmi Motors
- President: Nirakar Shrestha
- Head coach: Suman Shrestha
- League: Nepal Super League
Home colours	Away colours

Pokhara Thunders is a Nepali professional franchise football club based in Pokhara. The club competes in the Nepal Super League.

== History ==
The club was formed in March 2021 after the establishment of Nepal Super League, the first franchise football league in Nepal, under the supervision of All Nepal Football Association (ANFA). The club played their first match on 25 April 2021 against Butwal Lumbini F.C.

== Players ==
As of 7 December 2025

Note: Flags indicate national team as defined under FIFA eligibility rules; some limited exceptions apply. Players may hold more than one non-FIFA nationality.

No.	Pos.	Nation	Player
8	MF	NEP	Samyog gurung
3	DF	NEP	Padam Bhattarai
4	DF	NEP	Narendra Chaudhary
6	DF	NEP	Sakal Regmi
7	FW	NEP	Samir Tamang
9	FW	NEP	Chandan Kumar Das
10	FW	NEP	Nishan Limbu
12	DF	NEP	Prabin Sunar
13	MF	NEP	Janmejay Dhami
14	MF	NEP	Roshan Bujel
15	DF	UZB	Saiddoston Djafarov

No.	Pos.	Nation	Player
16	GK	NEP	Krishal Moktan
17	FW	NEP	Sudil Rai
23	MF	NEP	Suraj Jeu Thakuri
24	DF	NEP	Gaurab Shrestha
25	MF	NEP	Bishal Tamang
42	DF	NEP	Ekraj Budhathoki
50	FW	NGA	Michael Ijezie
77	FW	NEP	Samir Tandukar
84	DF	CMR	William
91	GK	CMR	Yves Priso

== Technical staff ==
Role	Name
Head coach	(Nepal) Suman Shrestha
Assistant coach	(Nepal) Rajendra Tamang
Goalkeeping coach	(Nepal) Binod Dangol
