= Lalitpur City FC =

Lalitpur City
- Full name: Lalitpur City Football Club
- Nickname: Lakhey
- Founded: 2021; 5 years ago
- Ground: Chyasal Stadium
- Capacity: 10,000
- Owner: Bhat-Bhateni Super Market
- President: Kamana Gurung
- Head coach: Vacant
- League: Nepal Super League
- 2025: Nepal Super League, Champions
Home colours	Away colours	Third colours

Lalitpur City Football Club is a Nepali professional franchise football club based in Lalitpur, Bagmati Province. The club competes in the Nepal Super League, the top flight football league in Nepal.

== History ==
Lalitpur City was formed in March 2021 after the establishment of the first ever franchise football league in Nepal, under the supervision of the All Nepal Football Association (ANFA). The club played their first match on 24 April 2021 against Kathmandu Rayzrs.

In November 2023, the club roped in Indian winger Nikhil Kadam. The club won its first Nepal Super League title during the second edition of the tournament, defeating Dhangadhi 3–2 in the final at the Dasarath Stadium on 30 December 2023.

On 2 February 2025, Lalitpur City hired former Leeds United legend Simon Grayson as head coach.

== Players ==
As of 3 February 2025

Note: Flags indicate national team as defined under FIFA eligibility rules; some limited exceptions apply. Players may hold more than one non-FIFA nationality.

No.	Pos.	Nation	Player
4	DF	NEP	Ananta Tamang (Captain)
5	DF	NEP	Abishek Waiba
8	MF	PLE	Jonathan Cantillana
9	FW	HAI	Kervens Belfort
10	FW	NGA	Imoh Ezekiel
11	MF	NEP	Nabin Lama
14	MF	NEP	Sudip Gurung
15	DF	NEP	Yogesh Gurung
18	MF	NEP	Santosh Khatri

No.	Pos.	Nation	Player
20	DF	NEP	Sanish Shrestha
21	MF	NEP	Aditya Shakya
22	GK	FRA	Jeffrey Baltus
23	MF	NEP	Mani Kumar Lama
31	GK	NEP	Samit Shrestha
38	FW	FRA	Papa Ibou Kébé
44	DF	SEN	Papé Diakité
77	FW	BHU	Chencho Gyeltshen

== Coaching history ==
As of January 2025

Head coach	From	To	P	W	D	L	GS	GA	%W
(United States) Pradip Humagain	23 March 2021	2 May 2021	4	0	3	1	2	3	0.00
(Nepal) Raju Tamang	2 May 2021	5 April 2022	4	3	0	1	6	3	75.00
(Australia) Ian Gillan	29 Sep 2023	30 Dec 2023	11	5	4	2	15	8	45.45
(England) Simon Grayson	2 Feb 2025	12 June 2025	8	5	3	0	15	8	62.50

P – Total of played matches W – Won matches D – Drawn matches L – Lost matches GS – Goals scored GA – Goals against
%W – Percentage of matches won

== Logo ==
Club logo dedicated to the first NSL title

== Honours ==
- Nepal Super League
  - Champions (2): 2023, 2025
