= FC Chitwan =

Chitwan
- Full name: Football Club Chitwan
- Nickname: The Panthers
- Founded: 2021; 4 years ago
- Ground: Krishnapur Sports Stadium
- Capacity: 1,000
- Owner: IME Sports and Entertainment
- President: Sachin Dhakal
- Head coach: Nabin Neupane
- League: Nepal Super League
Home colours	Away colours

Football Club Chitwan is a Nepali professional franchise football club based in Bharatpur. The club competes in the Nepal Super League, the top flight football league in Nepal.

== History ==
=== 2021 ===
The club was founded in March 2021 before the commencement of Nepal Super League, the first ever franchise football league in Nepal under the control of All Nepal Football Association (ANFA). The club played their first match on 26 April 2021 against Lalitpur City FC.

=== 2023 ===
On 29 September 2023, the club roped in former Indian midfielder Khalid Jamil as their head coach.

== Coaching record ==
As of 3 May 2021

Coach	From	To	P	W	D	L	GS	GA	%W
(Nepal) Meghraj K.C.	18 March 2021	2023	6	0	2	4	5	12	0.00

P – Total of played matches W – Won matches D – Drawn matches L – Lost matches GS – Goals scored GA – Goals against
%W – Percentage of matches won

== Team position by years ==
- NSL, 2021: 7th
