= 2021 SAFF Championship squads =

This article lists the confirmed national football squads for the 2021 SAFF Championship tournament held in the Maldives, in between 1 and 16 October 2021. The position listed for each player is per the squad list in the official match reports by the SAFF. The age listed for each player is on 1 October 2021, the first day of the tournament. Players may hold more than one non-FIFA nationality. A flag is included for coaches that are of a different nationality than their own national team.

== Bangladesh ==
Bangladesh announced their squad on 27 September 2021.

Coach: (Spain) Óscar Bruzón

No.	Pos.	Player	Date of birth (age)	Caps	Goals	Club
1	GK	Ashraful Islam Rana	1 May 1988 (aged 33)	24	0	(Bangladesh) Sheikh Russel KC
2	DF	Yeasin Arafat	5 January 2003 (aged 18)	6	0	(Bangladesh) Saif Sporting Club
3	DF	Rahmat Mia	8 December 1999 (aged 21)	21	0	(Bangladesh) Saif Sporting Club
4	DF	Topu Barman	20 December 1994 (aged 26)	38	4	(Bangladesh) Bashundhara Kings
5	DF	Rezaul Karim Reza	1 July 1987 (aged 34)	19	1	(Bangladesh) Sheikh Jamal Dhanmondi Club
6	MF	Jamal Bhuyan (Captain)	10 April 1990 (aged 31)	53	0	(Bangladesh) Saif Sporting Club
7	FW	Sumon Reza	15 June 1995 (aged 26)	9	0	(Bangladesh) Uttar Baridhara Club
8	MF	Biplu Ahmed	5 May 1999 (aged 22)	24	3	(Bangladesh) Bashundhara Kings
9	FW	Motin Mia	20 December 1998 (aged 22)	13	2	(Bangladesh) Bashundhara Kings
10	FW	Mahbubur Rahman Sufil	10 September 1999 (aged 22)	23	5	(Bangladesh) Bashundhara Kings
11	MF	Sohel Rana	27 March 1995 (aged 26)	43	0	(Bangladesh) Dhaka Abahani
12	DF	Bishwanath Ghosh	30 May 1999 (aged 22)	18	0	(Bangladesh) Bashundhara Kings
13	GK	Anisur Rahman Zico	10 August 1997 (aged 24)	7	0	(Bangladesh) Bashundhara Kings
14	DF	Tariq Kazi	6 October 2000 (aged 20)	5	0	(Bangladesh) Bashundhara Kings
15	FW	Jewel Rana	25 December 1995 (aged 25)	21	0	(Bangladesh) Dhaka Abahani
16	FW	Mohammad Ibrahim	7 August 1997 (aged 24)	20	1	(Bangladesh) Bashundhara Kings
17	DF	Riyadul Hasan Rafi	29 December 1999 (aged 21)	16	0	(Bangladesh) Saif Sporting Club
18	DF	Tutul Hossain Badsha	12 August 1999 (aged 22)	13	0	(Bangladesh) Dhaka Abahani
19	MF	Atiqur Rahman Fahad	15 September 1995 (aged 26)	5	0	(Bangladesh) Bashundhara Kings
20	MF	Mohammad Ridoy	1 January 2002 (aged 19)	0	0	(Bangladesh) Dhaka Abahani
21	MF	Rakib Hossain	18 November 1998 (aged 22)	10	0	(Bangladesh) Chittagong Abahani
22	FW	Saad Uddin	1 September 1998 (aged 23)	17	1	(Bangladesh) Dhaka Abahani
23	GK	Shahidul Alam Sohel	1 May 1992 (aged 29)	24	0	(Bangladesh) Dhaka Abahani

== India ==
India announced their squad on 26 September 2021.

Coach: (Croatia) Igor Štimac

No.	Pos.	Player	Date of birth (age)	Caps	Goals	Club
1	GK	Gurpreet Singh Sandhu (Vice Captain)	3 February 1992 (aged 29)	43	0	(India) Bengaluru
2	DF	Rahul Bheke	6 December 1990 (aged 30)	13	0	(India) Mumbai City
3	DF	Subhasish Bose	18 August 1995 (aged 26)	23	0	(India) ATK Mohun Bagan
4	DF	Chinglensana Singh	27 November 1996 (aged 24)	5	0	(India) Hyderabad
5	DF	Seriton Fernandes	26 October 1992 (aged 28)	2	0	(India) Goa
6	MF	Lalengmawia Ralte	17 October 2000 (aged 20)	6	0	(India) Mumbai City
7	MF	Anirudh Thapa	15 January 1998 (aged 23)	27	3	(India) Chennaiyin
8	MF	Glan Martins	1 July 1994 (aged 27)	5	0	(India) Goa
9	FW	Manvir Singh	7 November 1995 (aged 25)	22	4	(India) ATK Mohun Bagan
10	MF	Brandon Fernandes	20 September 1994 (aged 27)	10	0	(India) Goa
11	FW	Sunil Chhetri (Captain)	3 August 1984 (aged 37)	120	75	(India) Bengaluru
12	FW	Farukh Choudhary	8 November 1996 (aged 24)	5	1	(India) Jamshedpur
13	GK	Dheeraj Singh Moirangthem	4 July 2000 (aged 21)	0	0	(India) Goa
14	MF	Udanta Singh	14 June 1996 (aged 25)	29	1	(India) Bengaluru
15	MF	Jeakson Singh	21 June 2001 (aged 20)	1	0	(India) Kerala Blasters
16	MF	Mohammad Yasir	14 April 1998 (aged 23)	3	0	(India) Hyderabad
17	DF	Mandar Rao Dessai	18 March 1992 (aged 29)	6	0	(India) Mumbai City
18	MF	Sahal Abdul Samad	1 April 1997 (aged 24)	11	1	(India) Kerala Blasters
19	FW	Liston Colaco	12 November 1998 (aged 22)	5	0	(India) ATK Mohun Bagan
20	DF	Pritam Kotal	8 September 1993 (aged 28)	39	0	(India) ATK Mohun Bagan
21	MF	Suresh Singh Wangjam	7 August 2000 (aged 21)	6	0	(India) Bengaluru
22	FW	Rahim Ali	21 April 2000 (aged 21)	2	0	(India) Chennaiyin
23	GK	Vishal Kaith	22 July 1996 (aged 25)	4	0	(India) Chennaiyin

== Maldives ==
Maldives announced their squad on 27 September 2021.

Coach: Ali Suzain

No.	Pos.	Player	Date of birth (age)	Caps	Goals	Club
1	GK	Mohamed Shafeeu	22 July 1988 (aged 33)	0	0	(Maldives) Valencia
2	DF	Ali Samooh	5 July 1996 (aged 25)	23	1	(Maldives) Maziya
3	DF	Ahmed Numaan	10 November 1992 (aged 28)	14	0	(Maldives) Eagles
4	DF	Hussain Sifaau	4 February 1996 (aged 25)	16	1	(Maldives) Eagles
5	MF	Ismail Easa	19 December 1989 (aged 31)	28	3	(Maldives) Eagles
6	MF	Mohamed Umair	3 July 1988 (aged 33)	64	8	(Maldives) Maziya
7	FW	Ali Ashfaq	6 September 1985 (aged 36)	82	53	(Maldives) Valencia
8	MF	Aisam Ibrahim	7 May 1997 (aged 24)	8	0	(Maldives) Maziya
9	FW	Asadhulla Abdulla	19 October 1990 (aged 30)	40	9	(Maldives) Maziya
10	MF	Hamza Mohamed	17 February 1995 (aged 26)	44	2	(Maldives) Maziya
11	FW	Ali Fasir	4 September 1988 (aged 33)	60	12	(Maldives) Valencia
12	MF	Ashad Ali	14 September 1986 (aged 35)	58	3	(Maldives) Eagles
13	DF	Akram Abdul Ghanee (Captain)	19 March 1987 (aged 34)	70	2	(Maldives) TC Sports Club
14	DF	Haisham Hassan	21 July 1999 (aged 22)	8	0	(Maldives) Eagles
15	DF	Gasim Samaam	5 February 1993 (aged 28)	1	0	(Maldives) Unattached
16	FW	Hassan Raif Ahmed	30 January 1998 (aged 23)	0	0	(Maldives) Eagles
17	FW	Ibrahim Mahudhee	22 August 1993 (aged 28)	17	2	(Maldives) Maziya
18	GK	Ali Naajih	8 December 1999 (aged 21)	0	0	(Maldives) United Victory
19	FW	Naiz Hassan	10 May 1996 (aged 25)	30	9	(Maldives) Maziya
20	FW	Moosa Yaamin	29 December 1992 (aged 28)	6	0	(Maldives) Maziya
21	MF	Ibrahim Waheed Hassan	15 November 1995 (aged 25)	11	4	(Maldives) Maziya
22	GK	Mohamed Faisal	4 August 1988 (aged 33)	27	0	(Maldives) Valencia
23	MF	Hussain Nihan	7 June 1992 (aged 29)	14	0	(Maldives) Maziya

== Nepal ==
Nepal announced their squad on 26 September 2021.

Coach: (Kuwait) Abdullah Al Mutairi

No.	Pos.	Player	Date of birth (age)	Caps	Goals	Club
1	GK	Deep Karki	9 January 1998 (aged 23)	0	0	(Nepal) Pokhara Thunders
2	DF	Dinesh Rajbanshi	4 April 1998 (aged 23)	15	0	(Nepal) Dhangadhi
3	MF	Surajju Thakuri	19 December 2000 (aged 20)	1	0	(Nepal) Biratnagar City
4	DF	Ananta Tamang	17 January 1998 (aged 23)	37	2	(Nepal) Three Star Club
5	DF	Gautam Shrestha	21 February 2000 (aged 21)	4	0	(Nepal) Pokhara Thunders
6	DF	Suman Aryal	9 March 1996 (aged 25)	17	0	(Nepal) Tribhuwan Army
7	MF	Nitin Thapa	7 February 2002 (aged 19)	1	0	(Nepal) Pokhara Thunders
8	MF	Bishal Rai	6 June 1993 (aged 28)	28	3	(Nepal) Dhangadhi
9	MF	Sunil Bal	1 January 1998 (aged 23)	17	1	(Nepal) Biratnagar City
10	FW	Aashish Lama	1 December 1996 (aged 24)	2	0	(Nepal) Butwal Lumbini
11	MF	Pujan Uparkoti	9 May 1996 (aged 25)	6	0	(Nepal) Dhangadhi
12	FW	Suman Lama	9 March 1996 (aged 25)	13	0	(Nepal) Butwal Lumbini
13	MF	Tej Tamang	14 February 1998 (aged 23)	11	0	(Nepal) Kathmandu Rayzrs
14	FW	Anjan Bista	15 May 1998 (aged 23)	41	5	(Nepal) Lalitpur City
15	MF	Sujal Shrestha	5 February 1993 (aged 28)	38	3	(Nepal) Pokhara Thunders
16	GK	Kiran Chemjong (captain)	20 March 1990 (aged 31)	72	0	(Nepal) Dhangadhi
17	MF	Santosh Tamang	6 August 1994 (aged 27)	11	0	(Nepal) Biratnagar City
18	FW	Nawayug Shrestha	8 June 1990 (aged 31)	34	7	(Nepal) Pokhara Thunders
19	MF	Ayush Ghalan	21 February 2004 (aged 17)	2	0	(Nepal) Pokhara Thunders
20	GK	Bishal Shrestha	9 August 1992 (aged 29)	0	0	(Nepal) Butwal Lumbini
21	FW	Manish Dangi	17 September 2001 (aged 20)	5	1	(Nepal) Biratnagar City
22	MF	Kamal Thapa	20 September 1998 (aged 23)	2	0	(Nepal) Pokhara Thunders
23	MF	Rohit Chand	1 March 1992 (aged 29)	68	0	(Indonesia) Persija Jakarta

== Sri Lanka ==
Sri Lanka announced their squad on 26 September 2021.

Coach: (Bosnia and Herzegovina) (Australia) Amir Alagić

No.	Pos.	Player	Date of birth (age)	Caps	Goals	Club
1	GK	Sujan Perera (Captain)	18 July 1992 (aged 29)	32	0	(Sri Lanka) Up Country Lions
2	MF	Edison Figurado	25 July 1990 (aged 31)	9	1	Unattached
3	DF	Harsha Fernando	21 November 1992 (aged 28)	16	0	(Sri Lanka) Blue Eagles
4	DF	Duckson Puslas	4 April 1990 (aged 31)	14	0	(Maldives) T.C. Sports
5	DF	Chamod Dilshan	11 March 1997 (aged 24)	1	0	(Sri Lanka) Colombo FC
6	DF	Charitha Rathnayake	26 December 1992 (aged 28)	17	1	(Sri Lanka) Colombo FC
7	MF	Kavindu Ishan	17 October 1992 (aged 28)	30	1	(Sri Lanka) Up Country Lions
8	DF	Asikur Rahuman	31 December 1993 (aged 27)	17	1	(Sri Lanka) Defenders
9	FW	Mohamed Shifan		0	0	(Sri Lanka) Up Country Lions
10	MF	Dillon De Silva	18 April 2002 (aged 19)	2	0	(England) Queens Park Rangers
11	FW	Mohamed Aakib	26 June 2000 (aged 21)	10	2	(Sri Lanka) Colombo FC
12	MF	Chalana Chameera	10 January 1993 (aged 28)	16	0	(Sri Lanka) Colombo FC
13	MF	Waseem Razeek	13 September 1994 (aged 27)	4	2	(Sri Lanka) Up Country Lions
14	MF	Mohammadu Fasal	30 April 1990 (aged 31)	17	1	(Sri Lanka) Blue Star
15	MF	Marvin Hamilton	8 October 1988 (aged 32)	1	0	(England) Burgess Hill Town
16	FW	Mohamed Musthaq	16 December 1998 (aged 22)	1	1	(Sri Lanka) Up Country Lions
17	MF	Jude Supan	30 July 1998 (aged 23)	0	0	(Sri Lanka) Renown
18	FW	Supun Dananjaya	21 May 1998 (aged 23)	0	0	(Sri Lanka) Red Stars
19	FW	Rifkhan Mohamed	25 October 1999 (aged 21)	1	0	(Sri Lanka) Defenders
20	GK	Ruwan Arunasiri	19 June 1993 (aged 28)	4	0	(Sri Lanka) Blue Eagles
21	MF	Aman Faizer	12 March 1999 (aged 22)	7	0	(Sri Lanka) Renown
22	GK	Kaveesh Lakpriya	25 May 1995 (aged 26)	0	0	(Sri Lanka) Blue Star
23	DF	Roshan Appuhamy	6 July 1993 (aged 28)	3	0	(Sri Lanka) Defenders
