= 2015 SAFF Championship squads =

Below are the squads for the 2015 South Asian Football Federation Cup, hosted by India, which will take place between 23 December 2015 and 3 January 2016. The player's total caps, their club teams and age are as of 23 December 2015 – the tournament's opening day.

== Group A ==
=== India ===
Coach: (England) Stephen Constantine

No.	Pos.	Player	Date of birth (age)	Caps	Goals	Club
1	GK	Subrata Pal	24 November 1986 (aged 29)	63	0	(All India Football Federation) Mumbai City
2	DF	Aiborlang Khongjee	9 December 1987 (aged 28)	5	0	(All India Football Federation) Shillong Lajong
3	DF	Augustin Fernandes	13 October 1988 (aged 27)	1	0	(All India Football Federation) Salgaocar
5	DF	Arnab Mondal	25 September 1989 (aged 26)	18	1	(All India Football Federation) East Bengal
7	MF	Eugeneson Lyngdoh	10 September 1986 (aged 29)	8	0	(All India Football Federation) Bengaluru FC
9	FW	Robin Singh	9 May 1990 (aged 25)	23	2	(All India Football Federation) Delhi Dynamos
10	MF	Bikash Jairu	12 April 1982 (aged 33)	2	0	(All India Football Federation) East Bengal
11	FW	Sunil Chhetri (Captain)	3 August 1984 (aged 31)	84	47	(All India Football Federation) Bengaluru FC
12	FW	Jeje Lalpekhlua	7 January 1991 (aged 24)	28	9	(All India Football Federation) Chennaiyin
14	MF	Pronay Halder	25 February 1993 (aged 22)	2	0	(All India Football Federation) Dempo
16	GK	Karanjit Singh	8 January 1986 (aged 29)	17	0	(All India Football Federation) Chennaiyin
19	FW	Holicharan Narzary	10 May 1994 (aged 21)	1	0	(All India Football Federation) Dempo
20	DF	Pritam Kotal	9 August 1993 (aged 22)	6	0	(All India Football Federation) Mohun Bagan
21	DF	Narayan Das	25 September 1993 (aged 22)	7	0	(All India Football Federation) Dempo
23	GK	Gurpreet Singh Sandhu	3 February 1992 (aged 23)	5	0	(Norwegian Football Federation) Stabæk
24	DF	Lalchhuan Mawia	14 April 1989 (aged 26)	3	0	(All India Football Federation) Bengaluru FC
26	DF	Koushik Sarkar	8 February 1994 (aged 21)	0	0	(All India Football Federation) East Bengal
22	MF	Rowllin Borges	5 June 1992 (aged 23)	4	0	(All India Football Federation) Sporting Goa
43	MF	Lallianzuala Chhangte	6 August 1997 (aged 18)	0	0	(All India Football Federation) DSK Shivajians
46	MF	Sanju Pradhan	15 August 1989 (aged 26)	3	0	(All India Football Federation) East Bengal

=== Nepal ===
Coach: (Belgium) Patrick Aussems

No.	Pos.	Player	Date of birth (age)	Caps	Goals	Club
1	GK	Bikesh Kuthu	24 June 1993 (aged 22)	1	0	(All Nepal Football Association) Nepal Army Club
2	DF	Rabin Shrestha	17 May 1991 (aged 24)	21	0	(All Nepal Football Association) Nepal Police Club
3	DF	Biraj Maharjan	15 November 1990 (aged 25)	50	1	(All Nepal Football Association) Manang Marshyangdi Club
4	DF	Ananta Tamang	14 January 1998 (aged 17)	0	0	(All Nepal Football Association) Far Western FC
6	DF	Aditya Chaudhary	19 April 1996 (aged 19)	0	0	(All Nepal Football Association) APF Club
7	MF	Jagajeet Shrestha	7 August 1993 (aged 22)	16	1	(All Nepal Football Association) Three Star Club
8	MF	Bishal Rai	6 June 1993 (aged 22)	1	0	(All Nepal Football Association) Manang Marshyangdi Club
9	FW	Anjan Bista	15 May 1998 (aged 17)	1	0	(All Nepal Football Association) Nepal APF
10	FW	Anil Gurung (c)	23 September 1988 (aged 27)	42	10	(All Nepal Football Association) Manang Marshyangdi Club
11	MF	Heman Gurung	27 February 1996 (aged 19)	0	0	(All Nepal Football Association) Himalayan Sherpa
12	MF	Bikram Lama	29 August 1989 (aged 26)	7	0	(All Nepal Football Association) Three Star Club
16	GK	Kiran Chemjong	20 March 1990 (aged 25)	25	0	(All Nepal Football Association) Three Star Club
17	MF	Yogesh Gurung	4 August 1990 (aged 25)	0	0	(All Nepal Football Association) Jhapa XI
18	FW	Nawayug Shrestha	8 June 1990 (aged 25)			(All Nepal Football Association) Nepal Army Club
19	DF	Jitendra Karki	26 August 1987 (aged 28)	0	0	(All Nepal Football Association) Nepal Army Club
20	GK	Amrit Chaudhary	23 March 1994 (aged 21)			(All Nepal Football Association)
23	DF	Ranjit Dhimal	14 April 1991 (aged 24)	0	0	(All Nepal Football Association) Three Star Club
25	FW	Bimal Magar	26 January 1998 (aged 17)	7	1	(All Nepal Football Association) Far Western FC
27	FW	Nabin Lama	25 March 1992 (aged 23)			(All Nepal Football Association) Nepal Army Club
30	DF	Rohit Chand	1 March 1992 (aged 23)	27	0	(All Nepal Football Association) Manang Marshyangdi Club

=== Sri Lanka ===
Coach: Sampath Perera

No.	Pos.	Player	Date of birth (age)	Caps	Goals	Club
1	GK	Prabath Ruwan	19 June 1993 (aged 22)	0	0	(Football Federation of Sri Lanka) Air Force
4	MF	Chalana Chameera	10 January 1993 (aged 22)	0	0	(Football Federation of Sri Lanka) Army
5	DF	Dumidu Hettiarachchi	9 May 1983 (aged 32)	0	0	(Football Federation of Sri Lanka) Saunders
6	FW	Mohamed Izzadeen	17 January 1981 (aged 34)	17	4	(Football Federation of Sri Lanka) Army
7	FW	Zohar Zarwan	15 February 1996 (aged 19)	6	1	(Football Federation of Sri Lanka) Colombo FC
8	DF	Asikur Rahuman	31 December 1993 (aged 21)	4	0	(Football Federation of Sri Lanka) Army
10	FW	Kavindu Ishan	17 October 1992 (aged 23)	8	3	(Football Federation of Sri Lanka) Air Force
11	FW	Nipuna Bandara	17 June 1991 (aged 24)	11	2	(Football Federation of Sri Lanka) Air Force
13	MF	Chathuranga Sanjeewa	6 July 1991 (aged 24)	12	0	(Football Federation of Sri Lanka) Navy
14	MF	Mohamed Rifnas	9 January 1995 (aged 20)	6	1	(Football Federation of Sri Lanka) Renown
15	DF	Subash Madushan	31 May 1990 (aged 25)	5	1	(Football Federation of Sri Lanka) Navy
19	MF	Nalaka Roshan	31 March 1989 (aged 26)	6	1	(Football Federation of Sri Lanka) Navy
20	MF	Sajith Kumara	29 January 1993 (aged 22)	9	0	(Football Federation of Sri Lanka) Renown
21	GK	Kaveesh Fernando	25 May 1995 (aged 20)	0	0	(Football Federation of Sri Lanka) Colombo FC
23	DF	Mohamed Hakeem	15 September 1992 (aged 23)	2	0	(Football Federation of Sri Lanka) Renown
24	MF	Gnaruban Vinoth	30 November 1988 (aged 27)	0	0	(Football Federation of Sri Lanka) Solid SC
25	GK	Sujan Perera	18 July 1992 (aged 23)	10	0	(Football Federation of Sri Lanka) Air Force SC
28	FW	Madushan de Silva	16 November 1993 (aged 22)	9	0	(Football Federation of Sri Lanka) Army
33	MF	Edison Figurado	25 July 1990 (aged 25)	0	0	(Football Federation of Sri Lanka) Solid SC
35	MF	Sanka Danushka	28 December 1984 (aged 30)	0	0	(Football Federation of Sri Lanka) Army

== Group B ==
=== Maldives ===
Coach: (New Zealand) Ricki Herbert

No.	Pos.	Player	Date of birth (age)	Caps	Goals	Club
1	GK	Mohamed Imran (born 1985)	17 July 1985 (aged 30)			(Football Association of Maldives) T.C.
	GK	Mohamed Faisal			0	(Football Association of Maldives) Club Eagles
1	GK	Imran Mohamed (born 1980)	18 December 1980 (aged 35)	56	0	(Football Association of Maldives) Maziya
4	DF	Ahmed Abdulla	11 March 1987 (aged 28)	1	0	(Football Association of Maldives) New Radiant
8	DF	Samdhooh Mohamed		0	0	(Football Association of Maldives) Maziya
15	DF	Amdhan Ali	3 September 1993 (aged 22)	0	0	(Football Association of Maldives) Maziya
17	DF	Shafiu Ahmed	13 November 1988 (aged 27)	14	1	(Football Association of Maldives) New Radiant
21	DF	Ibrahim Abdulla				(Football Association of Maldives) Valencia
2	MF	Ali Samooh				(Football Association of Maldives) Mahibadhoo
	MF	Ali Fasir				(Football Association of Maldives) New Radiant
	MF	Mohamed Arif	11 August 1985 (aged 30)	24	3	(Myanmar Football Federation) Kanbawza
7	FW	Ali Ashfaq (captain)	5 September 1985 (aged 30)	102	44	(Football Association of Malaysia) PDRM
9	FW	Asadhulla Abdulla	19 September 1990 (aged 25)	6	2	(Football Association of Maldives) Maziya
10	FW	Ismail Easa			1	(Football Association of Maldives) Eagles
14	FW	Ahmed Nashid	9 April 1989 (aged 26)	2	0	(Football Association of Maldives) Maziya
16	FW	Hamza Mohamed				(Football Association of Maldives) New Radiant
	FW	Ansar Ibrahim				(Football Association of Maldives) Eagles
	FW	Naaiz Hassan				(Football Association of Maldives) T.C.
	FW	Ashad Ali	14 September 1985 (aged 30)	28	2	(Football Association of Maldives) New Radiant
	FW	Ahmed Imaz	12 April 1992 (aged 23)	3	0	(Football Association of Maldives) Maziya

=== Afghanistan ===
Coach: (Croatia) Petar Segrt

No.	Pos.	Player	Date of birth (age)	Caps	Goals	Club
1	GK	Ovays Azizi	29 January 1992 (aged 23)	4	0	(Danish Football Association) IF Skjold Birkerød
16	GK	Hamidullah Wakili	30 June 1994 (aged 21)	0	0	(Afghanistan Football Federation) Toofan Harirod FC
22	GK	Fardeen Kohistani	15 June 1994 (aged 21)	3	0	(Afghanistan Football Federation) Shaheen Asmayee F.C.
23	GK	Mahboobullah Kakar	1994	0	0	(Afghanistan Football Federation) Mawjhai Amu F.C.
3	DF	Hassan Amin	12 October 1991 (aged 24)	7	0	(German Football Association) 1.FC Saarbrücken
4	DF	Roholla Iqbalzadeh	2 November 1994 (aged 21)	1	0	(Norwegian Football Federation) Byåsen Toppfotball
5	DF	Masih Saighani	22 September 1986 (aged 29)	1	0	(German Football Association) TSV Steinbach
6	DF	Anoush Dastgir	27 November 1989 (aged 26)	2	0	(Royal Dutch Football Association) FC Lienden
13	DF	Sayed Mohammad Hashemi	2 March 1994 (aged 21)	1	0	(Afghanistan Football Federation) Shaheen Asmayee F.C.
20	DF	Mustafa Hadid	25 August 1988 (aged 27)	20	2	(German Football Association) Altona 93
29	DF	Abdullah Abdalli	5 June 1996 (aged 19)	0	0	(Afghanistan Football Federation) De Spin Ghar Bazan F.C.
2	MF	Abassin Alikhil	19 April 1991 (aged 24)	15	0	(German Football Association) Viktoria Aschaffenburg
8	MF	Faysal Shayesteh (Captain)	21 June 1991 (aged 24)	12	3	(Football Association of Thailand) Songkhla United F.C.
10	MF	Shabir Isoufi	9 March 1992 (aged 23)	3	1	(Royal Dutch Football Association) ASWH
11	MF	Norlla Amiri	23 August 1991 (aged 24)	5	2	(Swedish Football Association) Trelleborgs FF
17	MF	Mustafa Zazai	9 May 1993 (aged 22)	11	2	(German Football Association) FC St. Pauli II
18	MF	Ahmad Hatifi	13 March 1986 (aged 29)	17	1	unattached
19	MF	Omid Popalzay	25 January 1996 (aged 19)	3	0	(Royal Dutch Football Association) Achilles '29
21	MF	Kanischka Taher	4 April 1991 (aged 24)	3	0	(German Football Association) SC Kapellen-Erft
26	MF	Omid Homauoni	1994	0	0	(Afghanistan Football Federation) Oqaban Hindukush F.C.
44	MF	Rohid Samandary	1995	0	0	(Afghanistan Football Federation) De Spin Ghar Bazan F.C.
7	FW	Zubayr Amiri	2 May 1990 (aged 25)	4	0	(German Football Association) SC Hessen Dreieich
9	FW	Khaibar Amani	6 February 1987 (aged 28)	4	1	(German Football Association) SC Hessen Dreieich
12	FW	Anwar Akbari	2 August 1993 (aged 22)	4	0	(Afghanistan Football Federation) Oqaban Hindukush F.C.
28	FW	Josef Shirdel	3 April 1993 (aged 22)	0	0	(German Football Association) ETSV Weiche
37	FW	Mustafa Afshar	2 August 1986 (aged 29)	0	0	(Afghanistan Football Federation) Shaheen Asmayee F.C.
42	FW	Fardin Hakimi	16 November 1994 (aged 21)	1	0	(Afghanistan Football Federation) Oqaban Hindukush F.C.

=== Bangladesh ===
Coach: Maruful Haque

No.	Pos.	Player	Date of birth (age)	Caps	Goals	Club
1	GK	Shahidul Alam Sohel	1 May 1992 (aged 23)	14	0	(Bangladesh Football Federation) Sheikh Jamal Dhanmondi Club
22	GK	Russel Mahmud Liton	30 November 1994 (aged 21)	6	0	(Bangladesh Football Federation) Sheikh Russel KC
23	GK	Ashraful Islam Rana	1 May 1988 (aged 27)	1	0	(Bangladesh Football Federation) Mohammedan SC
	DF	Nasiruddin Chowdhury	9 October 1979 (aged 36)	16	1	(Bangladesh Football Federation) Sheikh Jamal Dhanmondi Club
15	DF	Waly Faisal	1 March 1985 (aged 30)	32	0	(Bangladesh Football Federation) Sheikh Russel KC
	DF	Atiqur Rahman Meshu	26 August 1988 (aged 27)	31	2	(Bangladesh Football Federation) Sheikh Russel KC
12	DF	Nasirul Islam Nasir	5 October 1988 (aged 27)	28	0	(Bangladesh Football Federation) Dhaka Abahani
2	DF	Raihan Hasan	10 September 1994 (aged 21)	15	0	(Bangladesh Football Federation) Sheikh Jamal Dhanmondi Club
5	DF	Yeamin Ahmed Chowdhury Munna	2 August 1991 (aged 24)	12	0	(Bangladesh Football Federation) Sheikh Jamal Dhanmondi Club
4	DF	Yeasin Khan	16 September 1994 (aged 21)	13	0	(Bangladesh Football Federation) Sheikh Jamal Dhanmondi Club
3	DF	Topu Barman	20 December 1994 (aged 21)	11	0	(Bangladesh Football Federation) Sheikh Russel KC
7	MF	Zahid Hossain	15 June 1988 (aged 27)	33	5	(Bangladesh Football Federation) Sheikh Russel KC
8	MF	Mamunul Islam Mamun (c)	12 December 1988 (aged 27)	41	2	(Bangladesh Football Federation) Sheikh Jamal Dhanmondi Club
6	MF	Jamal Bhuyan	10 April 1990 (aged 25)	17	0	(Bangladesh Football Federation) Sheikh Jamal Dhanmondi Club
13	MF	Monaem Khan Raju	7 July 1990 (aged 25)	15	0	(Bangladesh Football Federation) Sheikh Jamal Dhanmondi Club
18	MF	Sohel Rana	27 March 1995 (aged 20)	14	0	(Bangladesh Football Federation) Sheikh Jamal Dhanmondi Club
10	MF	Hemanta Vincent Biswas	13 December 1995 (aged 20)	13	1	(Bangladesh Football Federation) Sheikh Jamal Dhanmondi Club
20	FW	Shakhawat Hossain Rony	18 April 1993 (aged 22)	7	3	(Bangladesh Football Federation) Sheikh Jamal Dhanmondi Club
	FW	Jewel Rana	25 December 1995 (aged 19)	8	0	(Bangladesh Football Federation) Dhaka Mohammedan
9	FW	Nabib Newaj Jibon	17 August 1990 (aged 25)	4	0	(Bangladesh Football Federation) Team BJMC

=== Bhutan ===
Coach: Pema Dorji

No.	Pos.	Player	Date of birth (age)	Caps	Goals	Club
1	GK	Tshering Dendup	4 April 1994 (age 32)	3	0	(Bhutan Football Federation) Yeedzin
21	GK	Hari Gurung	18 February 1992 (age 34)	16	0	(Bhutan Football Federation) Yeedzin
3	DF	Dhan Bahadur Biswa	6 July 1994 (age 32)	0	0	(Bhutan Football Federation) Druk Star
4	DF	Jigme Dorji	26 February 1995 (age 31)	15	0	(Bhutan Football Federation) Thimphu City
5	DF	Man Bahadur Gurung	15 March 1993 (age 33)	12	0	(Bhutan Football Federation) Thimphu City
11	DF	Karma Nidup	31 December 1993 (age 32)	9	0	(Bhutan Football Federation) Thimphu City
20	DF	Dawa Gyeltshen	17 July 1992 (age 34)	19	0	(Bhutan Football Federation) Thimphu City
23	DF	Karun Gurung	9 June 1986 (age 40)	16	0	(Bhutan Football Federation) Terton
12	MF	Lungtop Dawa	18 December 1998 (age 27)	9	0	(Bhutan Football Federation) Druk Star
8	MF	Karma Shedrup Tshering	9 April 1990 (age 36)	18	0	(Bhutan Football Federation) Thimphu City
9	MF	Ugyen Dorji	23 December 1993 (age 32)	4	0	(Bhutan Football Federation) Terton
6	MF	Chimi Dorji	22 December 1993 (age 32)	19	0	(Bhutan Football Federation) Druk Star
14	MF	Sonam Phuntsho	13 October 1995 (age 31)	0	0	(Bhutan Football Federation)
15	MF	Kuenga Gyeltshen	5 May 1992 (age 34)	4	0	(Bhutan Football Federation) Druk United
17	MF	Biren Basnet	20 October 1994 (age 32)	14	1	(Bhutan Football Federation) Thimphu City
18	MF	Thinley Dorji	5 May 1990 (age 36)	6	0	(Bhutan Football Federation) Yeedzin
18	MF	Kezang Wangdi		4	0	(Bhutan Football Federation) Druk Star
22	MF	Lhendup Dorji	5 December 1994 (age 31)	12	0	(Bhutan Football Federation) Druk Star
13	MF	Tshering Wangdi		6	0	(Bhutan Football Federation) Druk United
19	MF	Kinzang Gyeltshen		0	0	(Bhutan Football Federation)
7	FW	Chencho Gyeltshen	10 May 1996 (age 30)	20	6	(Football Association of Thailand) Satun United
10	FW	Diwash Subba	9 March 1989 (age 37)	9	0	(Bhutan Football Federation) Yeedzin
16	FW	Tshering Dorji	10 September 1993 (age 33)	15	3	(Bhutan Football Federation) Thimphu City
