= 2021 Sri Lanka Super League =

Sri Lanka Super League
- Season: 2021
- Dates: 19 April 2021 – 11 January 2022
- Champions: Blue Star (1st title)
- AFC Cup: Blue Star
- Matches: 45
- Goals: 137 (3.04 per match)
- Top goalscorer: Senal Sandesh Pingho (10 goals)

The 2021 Sri Lanka Super League was the first season of Sri Lanka Super League, after a 3-year delay. It is the top division of Sri Lankan football.

== Summary ==
The start of the season was impacted by COVID-19. After the 2018–19 season, the inaugural Sri Lanka Super League was scheduled to kick-off in April 2020, but was rescheduled to November, 29 January 2021 and finally started on 19 April 2021, due to concerns of the pandemic.

The season was forced to play on a single round-robin system. After the International Break at the end of matchday 3, the tournament recommencement was scheduled to 2 July 2021. But, the Football Sri Lanka announced the postponement on 16 June 2021, due to travel restrictions.

=== Pre-season tournament ===
A pre season was launched with much glamour and delight, but the tournament was delayed further. Since the Sri Lanka national football team were set to play their 2022 FIFA World Cup qualifying second round games against Lebanon and South Korea in March, Football Sri Lanka conducted Sri Lanka Super League pre-season tournament without spectators.

Super League pre-season tournament was conducted with 10 clubs, divided in two groups, from 17 February to 24 March.

== Teams ==
The league is made up of 10 clubs that were selected from the Sri Lanka Champions League at the end of the 2018–19 season, after meeting the Football Federation of Sri Lanka's Club Licensing Criteria in association with the Asian Football Confederation.

=== Teams and their divisions ===
Note: Table lists clubs in alphabetical order.

Team	Division
Blue Eagles	Kelaniya
Blue Star Sports Club	Kalutara
Colombo Football Club	Colombo
Defenders Football Club	Homagama
Navy Sea Hawks FC	Welisara
New Young's Sports Club	Wennappuwa
Ratnam Sports Club	Kotahena
Red Stars Sports Club	Aluthgama
Renown Sports Club	Kotahena
Up Country Lions Sports Club	Nawalapitiya

== Foreign players ==
Team	Player 1	Player 2	Player 3	Player 4	Player 5
Blue Eagles					
Blue Star SC	(Nigeria) Jerry Arepade Ombenbe	(Guinea) Mohamed Traoré			
Colombo FC	(Ivory Coast) Jean Yapo Seka	(Cameroon) Bodric Tagne	(Nigeria) Olumide Akofe		
Defenders FC	(Pakistan) Muhammad Adil	(Cameroon) Stephane Dang			
Sea Hawks FC	(Japan) Motohiro Kaneshiro	(Japan) Chikara Tashiro	(Ghana) Samuel Kingston		
New Young's SC					
Ratnam SC	(Ghana) Enoch Danso	(Nigeria) Jide Jimoh			
Red Star SC	(Nigeria) Ismaila Abumere Ogudugu	(Nigeria) Muritala Oladeni	(Qatar) Mohammed Mubarak	(Nigeria) Emmanuel Godwin	
Renown SC	(Nigeria) Michael Job	(Nigeria) Olumide Agbeti			
Up Country Lions SC	(Uganda) George Abege	(Kyrgyzstan) Elijah Ari	(Liberia) Martin Karndu	(Liberia) Eugene Swen	

== League table ==
Pos	Team	Pld	W	D	L	GF	GA	GD	Pts	Qualification or relegation
1	Blue Star (C, Q)	9	7	1	1	21	9	+12	22	Qualification for AFC Cup preliminary round 1
2	Sea Hawks	9	6	1	2	16	11	+5	19 (Note: Head-to-head points: Sea Hawks 3, Colombo 0.)	
3	Colombo	9	6	1	2	22	11	+11	19	
4	Renown	9	5	2	2	10	7	+3	17	
5	Up Country Lions	9	5	1	3	17	8	+9	16	
6	Red Stars	9	2	4	3	18	16	+2	10	
7	Defenders	9	2	4	3	12	12	0	10	
8	New Young's	9	2	1	6	13	31	−18	7	
9	Ratnam	9	0	3	6	5	16	−11	3	
10	Blue Eagles	9	0	2	7	3	16	−13	2	

Source: RSSSF
(C) Champions; (Q) Qualified for the phase indicated

== Results ==
=== Fixture ===
Teams	BEG	BST	CFC	DFC	SHW	NYS	RAT	RST	REN	UCL
Blue Eagles		3–2	0–2	0–0	0–1	1–2	0–0	0–6	0–1	0–1
Blue Star			1–0	3–1	3–0	4–1	3–0	2–4	0–0	2–1
Colombo				3–1	2–3	4–0	4–1	2–2	2–1	3–2
Defenders					2–2	6–1	2–1	0–0	0–0	0–2
Sea Hawks						5–0	1–0	2–1	2–0	1–0
New Young's							3–1	4–4	1–2	1–4
Ratnam								0–0	1–2	1–1
Red Stars									1–3	0–3
Renown										1–0
Up Country Lions										

Source: RSSSF
Legend: Blue = left column team win; Yellow = draw; Red = top row team win.

=== Round 1 ===
19 April 2021	Colombo	4–0	New Young's
14:00	Dilshan 15', 85'; Zarwan 57' (pen.); Seka 79'

19 April 2021	Blue Star	2–4	Red Stars
16:00	Arepade 40'; Shifan 55'		Rahman 3', 35', 74'; Ogudugu 9'

20 April 2021	Renown	0–0	Defenders
13:00

21 April 2021	Ratnam	1–1	Up Country Lions
16:00	Jimoh 59'		Akhil 77'

21 April 2021	Blue Eagles	0–1	Sea Hawks
16:00			Hasmeer 11'

=== Round 2 ===
23 April 2021	Blue Star	1–0	Colombo
16:00	Sandesh Pingo 6'

24 April 2021	Defenders	0–0	Blue Eagles
13:00

24 April 2021	Renown	0–2	Sea Hawks
16:00			Hasmeer 27'; Shaeel 81'

25 April 2021	Red Stars	0–0	Ratnam
13:00

25 April 2021	New Young's	1–4	Up Country Lions
16:00	Nithushan 23'		W.Razeek 19', 65', 83'; Sujan Perera 90+3'

=== Round 3 ===
30 April 2021	Sea Hawks	5–0	New Young's
16:00	Hasmeer 28', 55'; Kaneshiro 31', 44', 74'

1 May 2021	Blue Star	3–0	Ratnam
13:00	Irshan 12'; Arshad 13'; Sandesh Pingho 36'

1 May 2021	Blue Eagles	0–6	Red Stars
16:00			Farhan 9'; Rislan 19'; Dilakshan 22'; Ogudugu 59', 67', 76'

2 May 2021	Colombo	2–1	Renown
16:00	Zarwan 34'; Seka 50'		Aman 42'

29 November 2021	Up Country Lions	2–0	Defenders
11:00	Abege 28'; Asmil 89'

=== Round 4 ===
5 December 2021	Colombo	2–2	Red Stars
11:00	Zarwan 69'; Shazny 90+5'		Rahman 59', 67'

6 December 2021	Renown	0–0	Blue Star
11:00

6 December 2021	Sea Hawks	1–0	Up Country Lions
15:00	Musthaq 90+3'

7 December 2021	Ratnam	1–2	Defenders
11:00	Hakeem 76' (pen.)		Jayathunga 41'; Mohamed 47' (pen.)

7 December 2021	Blue Eagles	1–2	New Young's
15:00	L.Fernando 86'		Sanjeewa 39'; Rumesh 53'

=== Round 5 ===
10 December 2021	Blue Eagles	0–1	Renown
11:00			Kurukulasuriyage 74'

11 December 2021	Sea Hawks	2–2	Defenders
11:00	D.Madushan 26'; S.Madushan 30'		Chameera 68'; Mohamed 73'

11 December 2021	Ratnam	1–4	Colombo
15:00	Hakeem 84' (pen.)		Dilshan 27', 39', 55'; Aakib 65'

12 December 2021	New Young's	4–4	Red Stars
11:00	Sanjeewa 19', 47', 53'; Nitharshan 68'		Dananjaya 6'; Ogudugu 24'; Rihad 28'; Rahman 45+4'

12 December 2021	Up Country Lions	1–2	Blue Star
15:00	Sujan Perera 71' (pen.)		Arepade 43'; Sandesh Pingho 53'

=== Round 6 ===
15 December 2021	Defenders	1–3	Colombo
11:00	Mohamed 58' (pen.)		Aakib 8', 46', 79'

16 December 2021	New Young's	3–1	Ratnam
11:00	Danushka 35'; Dananjaya 79'; Nikila 81'		Enoch 41'

16 December 2021	Blue Star	3–0	Sea Hawks
15:00	Arepade 14' (pen.); Sandesh Pingho 71', 88' (pen.)

17 December 2021	Red Stars	1–3	Renown
11:00	Rahman 35' (pen.)		Kurukulasuriyage 16'; Aman 54'; Iqbal 90+2'

17 December 2021	Up Country Lions	1–0	Blue Eagles
15:00	Shifan 90+5'

=== Round 7 ===
28 December 2021	Sea Hawks	2–1	Red Stars
11:00	Kaneshiro 45+4'; D.Madushan 90+5'		Rahman 15'

29 December 2021	Up Country Lions	2–3	Colombo
11:00	Nitharshan 20', 63'		Aakib 30', 90+6'; Tagne 90+5'

29 December 2021	New Young's	1–2	Renown
15:00	Agbeti 78' (o.g.)		Supan 53'; D.Madushan 57'

30 December 2021	Defenders	1–3	Blue Star
11:00	Jayasekara 43'		Arepade 37'; Sandesh Pingho 73', 84'

30 December 2021	Blue Eagles	0–0	Ratnam
15:00

=== Round 8 ===
7 January 2022	Red Stars	0–0	Defenders
15:00

7 January 2022	Ratnam	0–1	Sea Hawks
11:00			S.Madushan 58'

7 January 2022	Renown	1–0	Up Country Lions
11:00	Job 45+2'

7 January 2022	Blue Star	4–1	New Young's
15:00	Sandesh Pingho 52', 56', 83'; Arshad 90'		Mushikhan 21'

7 January 2022	Colombo	2–0	Blue Eagles
15:00	Seka 24'; Aakib 78'

=== Round 9 ===
10 January 2022	Renown	2–1	Ratnam
11:00	Priyadarshana 31'; Job 74'		Enoch 52'

10 January 2022	Defenders	6–1	New Young's
11:00	Izzadeen 27', 64', 85'; M.Fernando 45+2' (o.g.); Mohamed 84', 89'		Mushikhan 22'

10 January 2022	Red Stars	0–3	Up Country Lions
15:00			W.Razeek 1', 51', 59' (pen.)

11 January 2022	Colombo	2–3	Sea Hawks
15:30	Aakib 14'; Seka 87'		S.Madushan 36'; Hasmeer 65'; K.Ishan 75'

11 January 2022	Blue Star	3–2	Blue Eagles
15:30	Fazal 11'; Arshad 14'; M.Ishan 83'		L.Fernando 15'; Malshan 36'

== Top goalscorers ==
Player	Club	Goals
(Sri Lanka) Senal Sandesh Pingho	Blue Star SC	10
(Sri Lanka) Mohamed Rahman	Red Star SC	8
(Sri Lanka) Mohamed Aakib	Colombo FC	8
(Sri Lanka) Ahmed Waseem Razeek	Up Country Lions SC	6
(Sri Lanka) Chamod Dilshan	Colombo FC	5
(Nigeria) Ismaila Abumere Ogudugu	Red Star SC	5
(Sri Lanka) Rifkhan Mohamed	Defenders FC	5
(Sri Lanka) Mohamed Hasmeer	Sea Hawks FC	5
(Sri Lanka) Zohar Mohamed Zarwan	Colombo FC	4
(Sri Lanka) Chathuranga Sanjeewa	New Young's SC	4
(Japan) Motohiro Kaneshiro	Sea Hawks FC	4
(Nigeria) Jerry Arepade Ombenbe	Blue Star SC	4
(Ivory Coast) Jean Yapo Seka	Colombo FC	4

== Own goals ==
Player	Club	Own goals	Against
(Nigeria) Olumide Agbeti	Renown SC	1	New Young's SC
(Sri Lanka) Madushanka Fernando	New Young's SC	1	Defenders FC

== Clean sheets ==
Player	Club	Clean sheet
(Sri Lanka) Udayanga Perera	Sea Hawks FC	4
(Sri Lanka) Supun Kaveesh	Blue Star SC	4
(Sri Lanka) Rasik Rishad	Renown SC	4
(Qatar) Mohammed Mubarak	Red Star SC	3
(Sri Lanka) Weerasinghe Sujan Perera	Up Country Lions SC	3
(Sri Lanka) Nuwan Gimhana	Colombo FC	2

== Champions ==
Team	Location	Stadium	Capacity
Blue Star SC	Kalutara	Kalutara Stadium	15,000
