= Sri Lanka national football team results (2010–present) =

- Win Draw Loss

Sri Lanka national football team results from 2010 to the present date are as follows:

== Results ==
=== 2010 ===
16 February 2010 2010 AFC Challenge Cup	Myanmar	4–0	Sri Lanka	Colombo, Sri Lanka
	Kyaw Thi Ha 39'; Yan Paing 71'; Pai Soe 81'; Myo Min Tun 87'	Report		Stadium: Sugathadasa Stadium; Attendance: 3,000; Referee: Alireza Faghani (Iran)

18 February 2010 2010 AFC Challenge Cup	Sri Lanka	1–3	Tajikistan	Colombo, Sri Lanka
	Dalpethado 78'	Report	Rabimov 13'; Fatkhuloev 32', 90+2'	Stadium: Sugathadasa Stadium; Attendance: 1,000; Referee: Tan Hai (China PR)

20 February 2010 2010 AFC Challenge Cup	Sri Lanka	3–0	Bangladesh	Colombo, Sri Lanka
	Kaiz 7'; Gunarathna 43'; Sanjeev 79'	Report; Report		Stadium: Sugathadasa Stadium; Attendance: 600; Referee: Chaiya Mahapab (Thailand)

=== 2011 ===
27 March 2011 Friendly	Sri Lanka	2–2	Tajikistan	Colombo, Sri Lanka
	Shafraz 12' (pen.); Zain 80'	Report	Rabimov 56'; Vasiev 73'	Stadium: Sugathadasa Stadium

29 March 2011 Friendly	Sri Lanka	0–2	Tajikistan	Colombo, Sri Lanka
		Report	D.Ergashev 56'; Vasiev	Stadium: Sugathadasa Stadium

7 April 2011 2012 AFC Challenge Cup qualification	North Korea	4–0	Sri Lanka	Kathmandu, Nepal
	Choe Kum-Chol 2', 47'; Ri Chol-Myong 5'; Pak Nam-Chol 21'	Report		Stadium: Halchowk Stadium; Attendance: 2,000; Referee: Yousef Al-Marzouq (Kuwait)

9 April 2011 2012 AFC Challenge Cup qualification	Sri Lanka	0–1	Afghanistan	Kathmandu, Nepal
		Report	Hadid 82'	Stadium: Halchowk Stadium; Attendance: 1,800; Referee: Ali Sabah Adday Al-Qaysi (Iraq)

11 April 2011 2012 AFC Challenge Cup qualification	Nepal	0–0	Sri Lanka	Kathmandu, Nepal
		Report		Stadium: Dasarath Stadium; Attendance: 13,500; Referee: Ali Sabah Adday Al-Qaysi (Iraq)

29 June 2011 2014 FIFA World Cup qualification	Sri Lanka	1–1	Philippines	Colombo, Sri Lanka
16:00 (UTC+05:30)	Wellala 43'	Report	Burkey 50'	Stadium: Sugathadasa Stadium; Attendance: 4,000; Referee: Tayeb Shamsuzzaman (Bangladesh)

3 July 2011 2014 FIFA World Cup qualification	Philippines	4–0	Sri Lanka	Manila, Philippines
15:30 (UTC+8)	Caligdong 20'; P. Younghusband 43', 57' (pen.); Guirado 50'	Report		Stadium: Rizal Memorial Stadium; Referee: Kim Sang Woo (Korea Republic)

3 December 2011 2011 SAFF Championship	Sri Lanka	3–0	Bhutan	New Delhi, India
	Zain 29'; Nipuna 35', 65'	Report		Stadium: Jawaharlal Nehru Stadium; Referee: Masoud Tufayelieh (Syria)

5 December 2011 2011 SAFF Championship	Afghanistan	3–1	Sri Lanka	New Delhi, India
	Ahmadi 22', 36'; Yamrali 79'	Report	Zain 17'	Stadium: Jawaharlal Nehru Stadium; Referee: Timur Faizullin (Kyrgyzstan)

7 December 2011 2011 SAFF Championship	India	3–0	Sri Lanka	New Delhi, India
	Jeje 50'; Chhetri 70'; Warakagoda 90+3' (o.g.)	Report		Stadium: Jawaharlal Nehru Stadium; Referee: Timur Faizullin (Kyrgyzstan)

=== 2012 ===
28 April 2012 Friendly	Malaysia	6–0	Sri Lanka	Shah Alam, Selangor, Malaysia
	Wan Zack Haikal 25', 26'; Hazwan 73', 83', 90'; Azamuddin 86'	Report		Stadium: Shah Alam Stadium; Attendance: 10,000

=== 2013 ===
2 March 2013 2014 AFC Challenge Cup qualification	Afghanistan	1–0	Sri Lanka	Vientiane, Laos
	Arezou 45'	Report		Stadium: New Laos National Stadium; Attendance: 200; Referee: Muhammad Taqi Aljaafari Bin Jahari (Singapore)

4 March 2013 2014 AFC Challenge Cup qualification	Sri Lanka	2–4	Laos	Vientiane, Laos
	Ratnayake 74'; Gunaratne 81'	Report	Vongchiengkham 31' (pen.); Sayyabounsou 47'; Sayyaboun 71'; Phimmasen 77'	Stadium: New Laos National Stadium; Attendance: 1,000; Referee: Mukhtar Al Yarimi (Yemen)

6 March 2013 2014 AFC Challenge Cup qualification	Sri Lanka	3–0	Mongolia	Vientiane, Laos
	Gunaratne 55'; Migara 58', 88'	Report		Stadium: New Laos National Stadium; Attendance: 200; Referee: Muhammad Taqi Aljaafari Bin Jahari (Singapore)

2 September 2013 2013 SAFF Championship	Maldives	10–0	Sri Lanka	Kathmandu, Nepal
	Abdulla 5'; Ashfaq 21' (pen.), 45+1' (pen.), 51', 53', 58', 87'; Adhuham 76'; Fasir 83'; Umar 86'			Stadium: Dasarath Rangasala Stadium; Referee: Pratap Singh (India)

4 September 2013 2013 SAFF Championship	Sri Lanka	1–3	Afghanistan	Kathmandu, Nepal
	Mohamed Fazaluzzaman 36'	Report	Rafi 62'; Amiri 76'; Barakzai 87'	Stadium: Halchowk Stadium; Referee: Sudish Pandey (Nepal)

6 September 2013 2013 SAFF Championship	Sri Lanka	5–2	Bhutan	Kathmandu, Nepal
	Izzadeen 19', 26', 50', 90+3'; P. Dorji 32' (o.g.)	Report	P. Tshering 45'; Tenzin 58'	Stadium: Halchowk Stadium; Referee: Pratap Singh (India)

=== 2014 ===
26 August 2014 Friendly	Seychelles	1–2	Sri Lanka	Victoria, Seychelles
	Gervais Waye-Hive 30'	Report	Zarwan Johar 56'; Mohamed Rifnas 76'	Stadium: Stade Linité

28 August 2014 Friendly	Seychelles	3–0	Sri Lanka	Victoria, Seychelles
	Gervais Waye-Hive 29', 78'; Achille Henriette 64'	Report		Stadium: Stade Linité

24 October 2014 Friendly	Bangladesh	1–1	Sri Lanka	Jessore, Bangladesh
	Ameli 15'	Report	Roshan 28'	Stadium: Shamsul Huda Stadium; Attendance: 30,000

27 October 2014 Friendly	Bangladesh	1–0	Sri Lanka	Rajshahi, Bangladesh
	Ameli 3' (pen.)	Report		Stadium: Muktijuddho Sriti Stadium; Attendance: 30,000; Referee: Mizanur Rahman (Bangladesh)

=== 2015 ===
2 February 2015 Bangabandhu Cup	Bangladesh	1–0	Sri Lanka	Bangabandhu Stadium, Dhaka
17:00 UTC+6	Hemanta 41'			Referee: Khamis Mohammed SA Al-Marri

12 March 2015 2018 WC Q. R.1	Sri Lanka	0–1	Bhutan	Colombo, Sri Lanka
15:00 UTC+5:30		Report	Dorji 84'	Stadium: Sugathadasa Stadium, Colombo; Attendance: 3,500; Referee: Fu Ming(CHN)

17 March 2015 2018 WC Q. R.1	Bhutan	2–1	Sri Lanka	Thimphu, Bhutan
16:00 UTC+6:00	Chencho Gyeltshen 5', 90'	Report	Zarwan 34'	Stadium: Changlimithang Stadium, Thimphu; Attendance: 15000; Referee: Marai Al Awaji(KSA)

23 December 2015 SAFF Championship	Nepal	0–1	Sri Lanka	Kerala, India
18:30 UTC+5:30		Report	Rifnas 90+5'	Stadium: Trivandrum International Stadium, Thiruvananthapuram; Referee: Jameel Juma Abdulhusain (Bahrain)

25 December 2015 SAFF Championship	Sri Lanka	0–2	India	Kerala, India
18:30 UTC+5:30		Report	Singh 51', 73'	Stadium: Trivandrum International Stadium, Thiruvananthapuram

31 December 2015 SAFF Championship	Afghanistan	5–0	Sri Lanka	Kerala, India
18:30 UTC+5:30	Hashemi 45+1'; Taher 50'; Amani 56' (pen.); Hatifi 78'; Shayesteh 89'	Report		Stadium: Trivandrum International Stadium, Thiruvananthapuram; Attendance: 7,885; Referee: Sudhish Pandey

=== 2016 ===
8 January 2016 Bangabandhu Cup	Bangladesh	4–2	Sri Lanka	Jessore
14:45 UTC+6	Rony 17' 86'; Zahid 22'; Jibon 42'		Figurado 21' (pen.); Chaturanga 52'	Stadium: Shamsul Huda Stadium; Attendance: 12,000

13 January 2016 Bangabandhu Cup	Nepal	1–0	Sri Lanka	Dhaka
14:45 UTC+6	Magar 2'			Stadium: Bangabandhu Stadium; Attendance: 400

9 October 2016 Friendly	Cambodia	4–0	Sri Lanka	Phnom Penh, Cambodia
UTC+7	Visal 2'; Vathanaka 41'; Sokpheng 69', 89'	Report		Stadium: Olympic Stadium

3 November 2016 Solidarity Cup	Sri Lanka	1–2	Laos	Kuching Malaysia
UTC+8	Rahuman 90+3'	Report	Souksavath 58'; Sonthanala 83'	Stadium: Sarawak Stadium; Referee: Mohammed Al-Hoish (Saudi Arabia)

6 November 2016 Solidarity Cup	Mongolia	2–0	Sri Lanka	Kuching, Malaysia
UTC+8	Nyam-Osor 50' (pen.), 66' (pen.)			Stadium: Sarawak Stadium; Referee: Muhammad Nazmi Nasaruddin (Malaysia)

9 November 2016 Solidarity Cup	Sri Lanka	1–1	Macau	Kuching, Malaysia
UTC+8	Ishan 5'	Report	Choi 86'	Attendance: 93; Referee: Payam Heidari (Iran)

=== 2018 ===
29 August 2018 Friendly	Bangladesh	0–1	Sri Lanka	Nilphamari, Bangladesh
16:00 UTC+6		Report	Fazal 10'	Stadium: Nilphamari Stadium; Referee: Mizanur Rahman (Bangladesh)

5 September 2018 2018 SAFF G.S	India	2–0	Sri Lanka	Dhaka, Bangladesh
19:00 UTC+6	Kuruniyan 35'; Chhangte 47'	Report		Stadium: Bangabandhu National Stadium; Referee: Hanna Hattab (Syria)

7 September 2018 2018 SAFF G.S	Maldives	0–0	Sri Lanka	Dhaka, Bangladesh
19:00 UTC+6		Report		Stadium: Bangabandhu National Stadium; Referee: Mohammad Arafah (Jordan)

12 October 2018 Friendly	Sri Lanka	1–4	Malaysia	Colombo, Sri Lanka
21:00 UTC+8	Madushan 29'	Report	Norshahrul 65'; Nor Azlin 76'; Puslas 85' (o.g.); Sumareh 90+1'	Stadium: Sugathadasa Stadium; Referee: Hettikamkanamge Perera (Sri Lanka)

=== 2019 ===
28 May 2019 Friendly	Laos	2–1	Sri Lanka	Vientiane, Laos
18:30 UTC+7	11'; Douangmaity 87'			Stadium: New Laos National Stadium

31 May 2019 Friendly	Laos	2–2	Sri Lanka	Vientiane, Laos
18:30 UTC+7				Stadium: New Laos National Stadium

6 June 2019 FIFA World Cup qualification	Macau	1–0	Sri Lanka	Zhuhai, China
19:30 UTC+8	Duarte 52'	Report		Stadium: Zhuhai Sports Center Stadium; Attendance: 901; Referee: Kim Dae-yong (South Korea)

11 June 2019 FIFA World Cup qualification	Sri Lanka	3–0^{(Note: Macau did not send their team for the second leg due to safety reasons following the 2019 Sri Lanka Easter bombings. The AFC referred the matter to FIFA, and FIFA announced on 27 June 2019 that the match was declared a 3–0 forfeit victory to Sri Lanka, and consequently qualifying Sri Lanka to the second round.)}	Macau	Colombo, Sri Lanka
15:30 UTC+5:30				Stadium: Sugathadasa Stadium

31 August 2019 Friendly	United Arab Emirates	5–1	Sri Lanka	Riffa, Bahrain
20:00 UTC+3	Mabkhout 18' (pen.), 42', 52'; Barman 66'; Saleh 85'	Report	Musthaq 63'	Stadium: Bahrain National Stadium

5 September 2019 FIFA World Cup qualification	Sri Lanka	0–2	Turkmenistan	Colombo, Sri Lanka
19:30 UTC+5:30		Report (FIFA); Report (AFC)	Orazsähedow 8'; Amanow 53'	Stadium: Colombo Racecourse; Referee: Mohammed Al-Hoish (Saudi Arabia)

10 September 2019 FIFA World Cup qualification	Sri Lanka	0–1	North Korea	Colombo, Sri Lanka
19:30 UTC+5:30		Report (FIFA); Report (AFC)	Jang Kuk-chol 67'	Stadium: Colombo Racecourse; Referee: Timur Faizullin (Kyrgyzstan)

5 October 2019 Friendly	Malaysia	6–0	Sri Lanka	Kuala Lumpur, Malaysia
20:45 UTC+8	Syafiq 9', 76', 89'; Shahrul 14'; Norshahrul 17'; Akhyar 51'	Report		Stadium: Bukit Jalil National Stadium

10 October 2019 FIFA World Cup qualification	South Korea	8–0	Sri Lanka	Hwaseong, South Korea
20:00 UTC+9	Son Heung-min 10', 45+5' (pen.); Kim Shin-wook 17', 30', 54', 64'; Hwang Hee-chan 20'; Kwon Chang-hoon 76'	Report (FIFA); Report (AFC)		Stadium: Hwaseong Stadium; Referee: Hasan Akrami (Iran)

15 October 2019 FIFA World Cup qualification	Sri Lanka	0–3	Lebanon	Colombo, Sri Lanka
19:30 UTC+5:30		Report (FIFA); Report (AFC)	Maatouk 15' (pen.); El-Helwe 38' (pen.), 81'	Stadium: Colombo Racecourse; Attendance: 1,052; Referee: Ammar Mahfoodh (Bahrain)

19 November 2019 FIFA World Cup qualification	Turkmenistan	2–0	Sri Lanka	Ashgabat, Turkmenistan
16:00 UTC+5	Bäşimow 44'; Annadurdyýew 59'	Report (FIFA); Report (AFC)		Stadium: Köpetdag Stadium; Attendance: 26,300; Referee: Saoud Al-Athbah (Qatar)

=== 2020 ===
17 January 2020 2020 Bangabandhu Gold Cup GS	Palestine	2–0	Sri Lanka	Dhaka, Bangladesh
16:30 SLST	Abu Warda 90+3'; Salem 90+6'	Report		Stadium: Bangabandhu National Stadium; Referee: Yaasin Hanifiah (Malaysia)

19 January 2020 2020 Bangabandhu Gold Cup GS	Bangladesh	3–0	Sri Lanka	Dhaka, Bangladesh
17:30 SLST	M. Mia 17', 64'; Ibrahim 83'	Report		Stadium: Bangabandhu National Stadium; Referee: Virendha Rai (Bhutan)

=== 2021 ===
3 June 2021 FIFA World Cup Qualification	North Korea	Cancelled	Sri Lanka	Pyongyang, North Korea
				Stadium: Kim Il-sung Stadium

5 June 2021 FIFA World Cup Qualification	Lebanon	3–2	Sri Lanka	Goyang, South Korea
11:30 SLST	J. Oumari 11', 44'; M. Kdouh 17'	Report	A. Razeek 10', 61' (pen.)	Stadium: Goyang Stadium; Attendance: 73; Referee: Ahmad Yacoub Ibrahim (Jordan)

9 June 2021 2022 World Cup qualification	Sri Lanka	0–5	South Korea	Goyang, South Korea
20:00 UTC+9		Report	Kim Shin-wook 14', 42' (pen.); Lee Dong-gyeong 22'; Hwang Hee-chan 53'; Jung Sang-bin 77'	Stadium: Goyang Stadium; Attendance: 4,008; Referee: Shen Yinhao (China)

1 October 2021 2021 SAFF G.S.	Sri Lanka	0–1	Bangladesh	Malé, Maldives
21:00 MVT		Report	Topu 56' (pen.)	Stadium: National Football Stadium; Referee: Feras Taweel (Syria)

4 October 2021 2021 SAFF G.S.	Sri Lanka	2–3	Nepal	Malé, Maldives
21:00 MVT	Hamilton 57'; De Silva 90+4' (pen.)	Report	S. Lama 33'; Bista 51'; Ghalan 86'	Stadium: National Football Stadium (Maldives); Referee: Ammar Ashkanani (Kuwait)

7 October 2021 2021 SAFF G.S.	India	0–0	Sri Lanka	Malé, Maldives
16:00 MVT		Report		Stadium: National Football Stadium; Referee: Sajëçon Zajniddinov (Tajikistan)

10 October 2021 2021 SAFF G.S.	Maldives	1–0	Sri Lanka	Malé, Maldives
16:00 MVT	Ashfaq 6'	Report		Stadium: National Football Stadium (Maldives); Referee: Majed Al-Shamrani (Saudi Arabia)

8 November 2021 2021 Four Nations Tournament	Maldives	4–4	Sri Lanka	Colombo, Sri Lanka
21:00 SLST	A. Ghanee 8'; A. Fasir 9'; I. Mahudhee 34'; Ali Ashfaq 58'	Report	W. Razeek 64', 68', 72', 90+2'	Stadium: Racecourse Ground; Attendance: 2998; Referee: Mohammed Ahmed Al-Shammari (Qatar)

13 November 2021 2021 Four Nations Tournament	Sri Lanka	0–1	Seychelles	Colombo, Sri Lanka
21:00 SLST		Report	W. Mellie 68'	Stadium: Racecourse Ground; Attendance: 2775; Referee: Abdulhadi Al Asmar Al Ruaile (Qatar)

16 November 2021 2021 Four Nations Tournament	Sri Lanka	2–1	Bangladesh	Colombo, Sri Lanka
21:00 SLST	W. Razeek 25', 90+1' (pen.)	Report	J. Rana 71'	Stadium: Racecourse Ground; Attendance: 1250

19 November 2021 Four Nations' Tournament in Sri Lanka final	Sri Lanka	3–3 (a.e.t.) (1–3 p)	Seychelles	Colombo
19:00 SLST	Hamilton 4'; Aakib 57'; Razeek 75' (pen.)		Jean 45+1'; Asikur Rahuman 85' (o.g.); Tamboo 90'	Stadium: Racecourse Ground; Attendance: 4550
	Penalties
	Hamilton (penalty missed); Rahuman (penalty missed); Perera (penalty scored); Rathnayake (penalty missed)		(penalty missed) Fanchette; (penalty scored) Tamboo; (penalty scored) Jean; (penalty scored) Ernesta

=== 2022 ===
8 June 2022 2023 AFC Asian Cup qualification – third round	Uzbekistan	3–0	Sri Lanka	Namangan, Uzbekistan
20:30 UTC+5	Masharipov 36'; Khamdamov 48'; Sayfiev 61'	Report		Stadium: Markaziy Stadium; Attendance: 12,400; Referee: Thoriq Alkatiri (Indonesia)

11 June 2022 2023 AFC Asian Cup qualification – third round	Sri Lanka	0–2	Thailand	Namangan, Uzbekistan
17:00 UTC+5		Report	Thitiphan 34'; Worachit 90+5'	Stadium: Markaziy Stadium; Attendance: 570; Referee: Khaled Al-Shaqsi (Oman)

14 June 2022 2023 AFC Asian Cup qualification – third round	Maldives	1–0	Sri Lanka	Namangan, Uzbekistan
17:00 UTC+5	Mohamed 63'	Report		Stadium: Markaziy Stadium; Attendance: 920; Referee: Ali Reda (Lebanon)

=== 2023 ===
12 October 2023 2026 FIFA World Cup qualification – AFC first round	Yemen	3–0	Sri Lanka	Abha, Saudi Arabia
20:00 UTC+3	Maher 33'; Al-Gahwashi 67'; Al-Matari 90+3'	Report		Stadium: Prince Sultan bin Abdul Aziz Stadium; Attendance: 1,526; Referee: Nasrullo Kabirov (Tajikistan)

17 October 2023 2026 FIFA World Cup qualification – AFC first round	Sri Lanka	1–1 (1–4 agg.)	Yemen	Colombo, Sri Lanka
15:00 UTC+5:30	Rathnayake 89'	Report	Al-Matari 4'	Stadium: Colombo Racecourse; Attendance: 3,000; Referee: Clifford Daypuyat (Philippines)

=== 2024 ===
22 March 2024 2024 FIFA World Series	Sri Lanka	0–0	Papua New Guinea	Colombo, Sri Lanka
20:45 UTC+5:30		Report		Stadium: Colombo Racecourse; Attendance: 5,089; Referee: Meshari Ali Al Shammari (Qatar)

25 March 2024 2024 FIFA World Series	Sri Lanka	2–0	Bhutan	Colombo, Sri Lanka
20:45 UTC+5:30	De Silva 46'; Kelaart 54'	Report		Stadium: Colombo Racecourse; Attendance: 6,320; Referee: Meshari Ali Al Shammari (Qatar)

8 June 2024 Friendly	Brunei	1–0	Sri Lanka	Bandar Seri Begawan, Brunei
20:15 UTC+8	Azwan A. 61'	Report (FIFA) Report		Stadium: Hassanal Bolkiah National Stadium; Referee: Thorpong Somsing (Thailand)

11 June 2024 Friendly	Sri Lanka	0–1	Brunei	Bandar Seri Begawan, Brunei
20:15 UTC+8		Report	Azwan A. 37'	Stadium: Hassanal Bolkiah National Stadium; Attendance: 800; Referee: Usaid Jamal (Malaysia)

5 September 2024 2027 AFC Asian Cup qualification – play-off round	Sri Lanka	0–0	Cambodia	Colombo, Sri Lanka
20:45 UTC+5:30		Report		Stadium: Colombo Racecourse; Attendance: 2,955; Referee: Sultan Mohamed Al-Hammadi (United Arab Emirates)

10 September 2024 2027 AFC Asian Cup qualification – play-off round	Cambodia	2–2 (a.e.t.) (2–2 agg.) (2–4 p)	Sri Lanka	Phnom Penh, Cambodia
19:00 UTC+7	Nhean 58'; Sos 98'	Report	Kelaart 37'; Kammerknecht 120+2'	Stadium: Phnom Penh Olympic Stadium; Attendance: 14,178; Referee: Asker Nadjafaliyev (Uzbekistan)
	Penalties
	Taylor (penalty missed); Orn (penalty missed); Lim (penalty scored); Soeuy (penalty scored)		(penalty scored) Hingert; (penalty scored) Durrant; (penalty scored) Kelaart; (penalty scored) Perera

10 October 2024 Friendly	Myanmar	2–0	Sri Lanka	Yangon, Myanmar
16:00 UTC+6:30	L. M. Aung 16'; M. Mg Lwin 53'	Report		Stadium: Thuwunna Stadium; Referee: Souei Vongkham (Laos)

13 October 2024 Friendly	Myanmar	0–0	Sri Lanka	Yangon, Myanmar
16:00 UTC+6:30		Report		Stadium: Thuwunna Stadium

16 November 2024 Friendly	Yemen	0–1	Sri Lanka	Doha, Qatar
19:15 UTC+3		Report	Hingert 89'	Stadium: Al-Khor SC Stadium

19 November 2024 Friendly	Yemen	2–0	Sri Lanka	Doha, Qatar
19:15 UTC+3	Mahrous 21'; Hasan 95'	Report		Stadium: Al-Khor SC Stadium

=== 2025 ===
20 March 2025 Friendly	Laos	1–2	Sri Lanka	Vientiane, Laos
19:00 UTC+7	Souvanny 89'	Report	Dekker 18'; Rajamohan 55'	Stadium: New Laos National Stadium; Referee: Songkran Bunmeekiart (Thailand)

25 March 2025 2027 AFC Asian Cup Q	Thailand	1–0	Sri Lanka	Bangkok, Thailand
19:30 UTC+7	Patrik 43'	Report (AFC)		Stadium: Rajamangala Stadium; Attendance: 17,207; Referee: Zhang Lei (China)

5 June 2025 Friendly	Sri Lanka	1–0	Brunei	Bangkok, Thailand
17:00 UTC+7	Perera 57'	Report		Stadium: Alpine Football Camp; Referee: Torpong Somsing (Thailand)

10 June 2025 2027 AFC Asian Cup Q	Sri Lanka	3–1	Chinese Taipei	Colombo, Sri Lanka
15:45 UTC+5:30	Rajamohan 49'; De Silva 53'; Ahmed 58'	Report Report (AFC)	Huang 70'	Stadium: Colombo Racecourse; Attendance: 3,710; Referee: Daniel Elder (Australia)

6 September 2025 Friendly	Sri Lanka	0–3	Maldives	Colombo, Sri Lanka
17:30 UTC+5:30		Report	H. Naiz 27'; Hussain 34'; Fasir 90+2'	Stadium: Colombo Racecourse; Referee: Mahmood Salim Said (Oman)

9 September 2025 Friendly	Sri Lanka	1–1	Maldives	Colombo, Sri Lanka
17:30 UTC+5:30	Kelaart 90+2'	Report	H. Naiz 67'	Stadium: Colombo Racecourse; Referee: Mahmood Salim Said (Oman)

9 October 2025 2027 AFC Asian Cup Q	Sri Lanka	1–0	Turkmenistan	Colombo, Sri Lanka
15:45 UTC+5:30	Perera 67'	Report; Report (AFC)		Stadium: Colombo Racecourse; Attendance: 2,440; Referee: Tam Ping Wun (Hong Kong)

14 October 2025 2027 AFC Asian Cup Q	Turkmenistan	2–1	Sri Lanka	Arkadag, Turkmenistan
18:45 UTC+5	Tagaýew 52'; Saparow 57'	Report; Report (AFC)	Annagulyýew 65' (o.g.)	Stadium: Arkadag Stadium; Attendance: 10,000; Referee: Asker Nadjafaliyev (Uzbekistan)

18 November 2025 2027 AFC Asian Cup Q	Sri Lanka	0–4	Thailand	Colombo, Sri Lanka
15:45 UTC+5:30		Report; Report (AFC)	Thanawat 7'; Soonsup-Bell 65', 90'; Pansa 77'	Stadium: Colombo Racecourse; Attendance: 2,910; Referee: Sultan Mohamed Al Hammadi (United Arab Emirates)

=== 2026 ===
31 March 2027 AFC Asian Cup Q	Chinese Taipei	1–3	Sri Lanka	Taipei, Taiwan
18:30 UTC+7	Yu Yao-hsing 55'	Report; Report (AFC)	Suresh 18'; Senthurvasan 26'; Tiao 53' (o.g.)	Stadium: Taipei Municipal Stadium; Attendance: 1,556; Referee: Jansen Foo (Singapore)

8 June Friendly	Bhutan	1–4	Sri Lanka	Bangkok, Thailand
	Rinzin 80'		Dekker 16'; Bharath 63'; Razeek 78'; Rahul 92'	Stadium: NT Stadium; Referee: Wiwat Jumpaoon (Thailand)

27 September Friendly	Seychelles	0–3	Sri Lanka	Victoria, Seychelles
17:30 UTC+5:30		Report	Rajamohan 45+2' (pen.), 52'; De Silva 76'	Stadium: Stade Linité; Referee: Hery Tiana Andriananivoarison (Madagascar)

30 September Friendly	Seychelles	0–2	Sri Lanka	Victoria, Seychelles
18:30 UTC+5:30		Report	De Silva 32'; Razeek 84'	Stadium: Stade Linité; Referee: Hery Tiana Andriananivoarison (Madagascar)

2 October Friendly	Mauritius	3–0	Sri Lanka	Saint Pierre, Mauritius
19:00 UTC+4	De Robillard 28' (pen.); W. François 33'; A. François 59'	Report		Stadium: Côte d'Or National Sports Complex

5 October Friendly	Sri Lanka	3–2	Mauritius	Saint Pierre, Mauritius
17:30 UTC+5:30	Bharath 20'; Senthurvasan 40'; Durrant 70'	Report	de Robillard 7'; Francois 80'	Stadium: Côte d'Or National Sports Complex

8 November 2026 SAFF Championship	Sri Lanka	2–2	Bhutan	Dhaka, Bangladesh
20:00 UTC+6	Kelaart 35'; Razeek 43'	SAFF; FIFA	Tshering 34'; Gyeltshen 76'	Stadium: National Stadium; Attendance: 1,012; Referee: Mohammed Khalfan Al Manai (Oman)

11 November 2026 SAFF Championship	Sri Lanka	0–4	Bangladesh	Dhaka, Bangladesh
20:00 UTC+6		SAFF; FIFA	Shome 8'; Choudhury 44'; Wahid 53'; Rakib 87'	Stadium: National Stadium; Attendance: 18,631; Referee: Lê Vũ Linh (Vietnam)
