= 2021 Biratnagar City F.C. season =

Biratnagar City
2021 season
- Owner: Biratnagar City Company Pvt. Ltd.
- Chairman: Subhashish Koirala
- Manager: Yan Law
- Stadium: Sahid Rangashala
- Nepal Super League: 6 of 7
- Top goalscorer: League: (Spain) Pedro Manzi (Goals 4); All: (Spain) Pedro Manzi (Goals 4)

The 2021 season was Biratnagar City's 1st Nepal Super League season in 2021.

== Season overview ==
On 18 March, Biratnagar City announced the signing of Nepal national football team defender Ranjit Dhimal as its marquee player.

On the auction of Nepal Super League, Biratnagar City acquired various players such as midfielder Sunil Bal, Bijal Dhimal, Hem Tamang, etc.

On 14 April, Biratnagar City signed contract with three foreign players, Spanish forward Pedro Manzi, Nigerian forward Adelaja Somide and Cameroonian defender Ulrich Siewe.

== Competition ==
=== Nepal Super League ===
==== Results ====
| 25 April 2021 2 | Biratnagar City FC | 3–0 | Dhangadhi FC | Kathmandu |
| 14:30 NST | Dhimal 15'; Oluwawunmi 57'; Tamang 69' | Report | | Stadium: Dasharath Rangasala Stadium |

| 28 April 2021 2 | Biratnagar City | 1–0 | Pokhara Thunders | Kathmandu |
| 17:30 NST | N. Shrestha 83' | Report | | Stadium: Dasharath Rangasala Stadium |

| 1 May 2021 11 | Butwal Lumbini FC | 2–2 | Biratnagar City FC | Kathmandu |
| 17:30 NST | K. Omolaja 6'; L. Ruchal 68' | Report | P. Manzi 42'; S. Tamang 90+2' | Stadium: Dasharath Rangasala Stadium |

| 3 May 2021 13 | FC Chitwan | 0–2 | Biratnagar City FC | Kathmandu |
| 17:30 NST | | Report | P. Manzi 73'; S. Tamang 89' | Stadium: Dasharath Rangasala Stadium |

| 6 May 2021 17 | Kathmandu Rayzrs FC | 5–4 | Biratnagar City FC | Kathmandu |
| 17:30 NST | M. Olaoumu 35', 36', 68'; S. Sameer 41'; T. Gurung 82' | Report | O. Somide 5'; P. Manzi 33', 90+4'; R. Dhimal 79' | Stadium: Dasharath Rangasala Stadium |

| 8 May 2021 19 | Biratnagar City FC | 0–4 | Lalitpur City FC | Kathmandu |
| 14:30 NST | | Report | A. Bista 36', 81'; B. Rana 64'; N. Novruzov 90+6' | Stadium: Dasharath Rangasala Stadium |

==== League table ====
| Pos | Team | Pld | W | D | L | GF | GA | GD | Pts | Qualification |
|---|---|---|---|---|---|---|---|---|---|---|
| 4 | Butwal Lumbini | 6 | 2 | 2 | 2 | 7 | 6 | +1 | 8 | Advance to Playoffs |
| 5 | Pokhara Thunders | 6 | 2 | 2 | 2 | 3 | 4 | −1 | 8 | |
| 6 | Biratnagar City | 6 | 2 | 1 | 3 | 11 | 12 | −1 | 7 | |
| 7 | Chitwan | 6 | 0 | 2 | 4 | 5 | 12 | −7 | 2 | |

Source: Goal Nepal
Rules for classification: 1) points; 2) head-to-head points; 3) head-to-head goal difference; 4) goal difference; 5) number of goals scored; 6) play-off match

== Statistics ==
As of 21 May 2021

| No. | Player | Pos. | Nepal Super League | | | |
| No. | Player | Pos. | Apps(Sub) | Goal | Booked | Sent off (straight red) |
|---|---|---|---|---|---|---|
| 3 | (Nepal) Diwakar Chaudhary | DF | 1(1) | | | |
| 5 | (Nepal) Manoj Rai | DF | | | | |
| 6 | (Nepal) Bikram Dhimal | DF | 6 | 1 | | |
| 7 | (Nepal) Manish Dangi | FW | 0(5) | | 2 | |
| 8 | (Nepal) Sushil Lama | MF | 0(2) | | | |
| 9 | (Nepal) Sunil Bal | MF | 6 | | 1 | |
| 10 | (Nepal) Nir Kumar Rai | FW | 5 | | | |
| 11 | (Nepal) Saroj Dahal | DF | 5 | | 1 | |
| 13 | (Nepal) Hem Tamang | MF | 4 | | | |
| 14 | (Nepal) Santosh Tamang | MF | 6 | 3 | 1 | |
| 15 | (Cameroon) Ulrich Siewe | DF | 6 | | | |
| 18 | (Nepal) Bijay Dhimal | DF | 0(3) | | | 1 |
| 19 | (Spain) Pedro Manzi | FW | 6 | 4 | 1 | |
| 20 | (Nepal) Suraj Jeu Thakuri | MF | 2(2) | | 2 | |
| 21 | (Nepal) Sunil Khadka | FW | 1(3) | | | |
| 22 | (Nepal) Surya Adhikari | GK | 0(1) | | | |
| 23 | (Nepal) Ranjit Dhimal | DF | 6 | 1 | 1 | |
| 25 | (Nepal) Ashok Thapa | MF | 0(2) | | | |
| 29 | (Nigeria) Adelaja Somide | FW | 6 | 2 | | |
| 33 | (Nepal) Kishor Giri | GK | 6 | | | |

=== Goalscorers ===
Includes all competitive matches. The list is sorted alphabetically by surname when total goals are equal.

| Rank | No. | Pos. | Player | Nepal Super League Goals |
|---|---|---|---|---|
| 1 | | FW | (Spain) Pedro Manzi | 4 |
| 2 | | MF | (Nepal) Santosh Tamang | 3 |
| 3 | | FW | (Nigeria) Adelaja Somide | 2 |
| 4 | | DF | (Nepal) Bikram Dhimal | 1 |
| 4 | | DF | (Nepal) Ranjit Dhimal | 1 |
