= Kezang =

Kezang is a Tibetan name that may refer to:

- Kezang Dorji (born 1989), Bhutanese rapper and social worker
- Kezang Wangdi (born 1997), Bhutanese footballer
- Kezang Wangmo, Bhutanese actress, poet, singer and dancer
- Zheng Kezang (1662–1681), prince and regency of Kingdom of Tungning
