= Mohammed Mubarek =

Mohammed Mubarek or Mohammed bin Mubarek or Muhammad Mubarek is an Arabic patronymic name, means Mohammed, Son of Mubarek:

- Mohammed Mubarek Al Hinai (born 1984), Omani footballer
- Mohammed Mubarek Salah Al Qurbi (born 1975), Saudi citizen who suspected as terrorist
- Mohammed Mubarak, Qatari footballer
