= Pedro Manzi =

Uruguayan footballer (born 1988)

Personal information
- Full name: Pedro Javier Manzi Cruz
- Date of birth: 13 October 1988 (age 38)
- Place of birth: Montevideo, Uruguay
- Height: 1.72 m (5 ft 8 in)
- Position: Forward

Youth career
- Espanyol

Senior career*
Years	Team	Apps	(Gls)
2009–2010	Universidad de Las Palmas	20	(9)
2010–2011	UD Tijarafe	24	(12)
2011–2013	Atlético Granadilla	14	(14)
2013–2014	Marbella	13	(3)
2014–2015	Tenisca	44	(27)
2015–2017	Ibarra	66	(45)
2017–2018	Hospitalet	16	(17)
2018–2019	Chennai City	20	(22)
2020	Albirex Niigata	8	(0)
2021	Mohammedan	8	(6)
2021	Biratnagar City	6	(4)
2021	Bengaluru United		
2022	Rajasthan United	12	(3)
2022–2024	Panadería Pulido	46	(16)
2024	Malappuram		
2025	Fleet		
- * Club domestic league appearances and goals

Pedro Javier Manzi Cruz (born 13 October 1988) is a Spanish professional footballer who plays as a forward.

== Career ==
=== Chennai City FC ===
In May 2018, he joined I-League club Chennai City. On 26 October 2018, he made his debut for the club against Indian Arrows. He scored a hat-trick and led his side to a 4–1 home win. He has scored four hat-tricks in the 2018–19 I-League season for Chennai City. He also helped the team winning their first I-League title, and won the golden boot with 21 goals (jointly with Trinidadian Willis Plaza).

=== Albirex Niigata ===
In 2019, Manzi signed for Japanese J2 League side Albirex Niigata, where he played 8 league games and scored 2 goals.

=== Mohammedan Sporting ===
Manzi returned to India in 2021, signing with I-League side Mohammedan Sporting. He debuted for the Black Panthers on 18 February against Aizawl FC.

=== Biratnagar City ===
On 14 April 2021, Manzi was announced as the first foreign signing of Biratnagar City FC who play in the newly created Nepal Super League. He scored 4 goals in 6 games. The Spaniard was an instant fan favourite. He also won Super Player Of The Match against Butwal Lumbini F.C.

=== Bengaluru United ===
In August 2021, Manzi moved back to India and joined I-League 2nd Division side FC Bengaluru United and scored his first goal in a 1–0 win against Central Reserve Police Force at the 2021 Durand Cup in Kalyani. He scored four goals in the tournament, as their journey ended with a 4–2 defeat to Mohammedan Sporting in semi-finals.

=== Rajasthan United F.C ===
In January 2022, Manzi signed for I-League club Rajasthan United FC as free agent.

== Career statistics ==
=== Club ===
As of 2 May 2022

Appearances and goals by club, season and competition
Club	Season	League			Cup		Continental		Total	
Club	Season	Division	Apps	Goals	Apps	Goals	Apps	Goals	Apps	Goals
Chennai City	2018–19	I-League	18	21	3 (Note: Appearance(s) in Super Cup)	4	—		21	25
Chennai City	2019–20	I-League	2	1	0	0	—		2	1
Albirex Niigata	2020	J2 League	8	0	0	0	—		8	0
Mohammedan	2020–21	I-League	8	6	0	0	—		8	6
Biratnagar City	2021	Nepal Super League	6	4	0	0	—		6	4
Bengaluru United	2021	I-League 2nd Division	2	1	3 (Note: Appearance(s) in Durand Cup)	4	—		5	5
Rajasthan United	2021–22	I-League	12	3	0	0	—		12	3
Malappuram	2024–25	Super League Kerala	2	1	0	0	—		12	2
Career total			56	36	6	8	0	0	62	46

== Honours ==
Chennai City

- I-League: 2018–19

Individual

- 2018–19 I-League Golden Boot (21 goals)
