= Oxford City F.C. =

English football club

Oxford City
- Full name: Oxford City Football Club
- Nickname: The Hoops
- Founded: 1882; 144 years ago
- Ground: The MGroup Stadium, Court Place Farm, Marsh Lane, Marston
- Capacity: 3,100
- Chairman: Andy Sinnott
- Manager: Ross Jenkins
- League: National League North
- 2025–26: National League North, 17th of 24
- Website: oxfordcityfc.co.uk
Home colours	Away colours

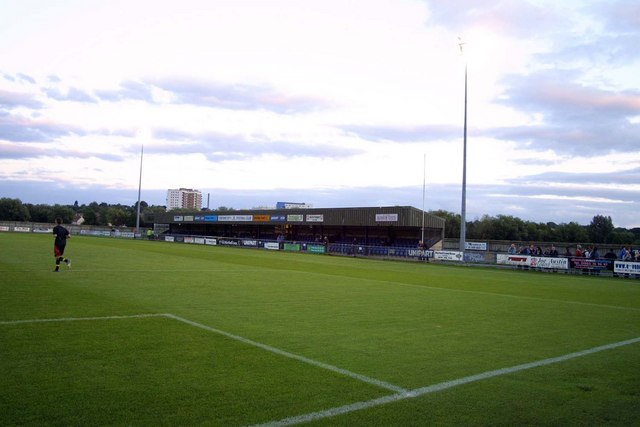
Marsh Lane, home of Oxford City F.C.

Oxford City Football Club is a semi-professional association football club based in Marston, Oxford, England. They compete in the National League North, the sixth tier of the English football league system. They play their home matches at Marsh Lane.

== History ==
The club played their first recorded match on 15 March 1884 at Thame Grammar School, losing 4–2. Fixtures were irregular for over a decade, with none at all played between 1886 and 1893, but the club was reorganized and reconstituted in 1897 and soon became the leading club in Oxfordshire, winning the FA Amateur Cup in 1906, before joining the Isthmian League the following year.

In the latter half of the 20th century, the club went into decline and soon fell behind Headington United after that club turned professional in 1949. An attempt was made to return the club to success in 1979 when it became a limited company and later when England World Cup winning captain Bobby Moore was appointed manager with his former West Ham United team-mate Harry Redknapp as his assistant.

The club reached its lowest point in 1988 when they were evicted from their White House Ground by their landlords Brasenose College, who sold it off for housing. Forced to resign from the Isthmian League, the club did not reform and return to senior football until 1990 when based at Cutteslowe Park, they entered the South Midlands League Division One, winning promotion in their first season. They returned to the Isthmian League in 1993 when they also moved to their current ground. The club continued to climb through the divisions of that League during the 1990s and reached the final of the FA Vase in 1995.

Highlights of the next decade included two years in the Isthmian League Premier Division and an epic FA Cup run in 1999–2000 which culminated in a three-game battle against Wycombe Wanderers in the First Round proper. City were eventually edged out 1–0 at Oxford United's Manor Ground. The first replay had been abandoned because of a fire alarm just as the penalty shootout was about to start; this remains the only FA Cup tie to go to a second replay since the FA ruled that all ties should be settled after a maximum of two games. This rule change also means that City's other FA Cup record – the six games needed before losing to Alvechurch in 1971–72 – will probably never be beaten.

In 2005, the club were relegated back to the Spartan South Midlands League but were promoted at the first time of asking under manager Andy Lyne, winning both the Championship and the Premier Cup.

In November 2006, Lyne resigned as manager to become the club's Director of Football. Justin Merritt succeeded him as Player Manager with former Oxford United player Mike Ford as his assistant. Merritt subsequently stepped down in August 2009 and Ford took over as manager.

On 3 May 2008, Oxford City were promoted from the Southern League Division One South and West with a 1–0 win over Uxbridge. In their first season in the Premier Division, they finished in 6th place, narrowly missing out on the play-offs.

In season 2011–12, Oxford City finished as runners-up, narrowly missing out on the title. They won the play-off final against AFC Totton to gain promotion to Conference North for the first time in their history. The club enjoyed a successful first season in the Conference North, finishing in 10th place, 11 points clear of the relegation zone. The following season proved more of a struggle, with the club initially finishing in the relegation zone after a three-point deduction for fielding an ineligible player, only to be reprieved from relegation after Vauxhall Motors resigned from the Football Conference. Mike Ford left the club shortly after the season ended.

On 18 May 2014, Oxford City appointed Justin Merritt as Manager; his Assistant Danny Nicholls joined him with coaching roles for former players Mark Jones Alan Foster and Enrique Guillen continuing his coaching role at the club. For 2015–16, they moved from Conference North to Conference South – the division was renamed National League South. Merritt resigned in December 2016, becoming the club's general manager, and Mark Jones took over as first-team coach, initially on a caretaker basis.

In season 2017–18, the Hoops enjoyed a historic run in the FA Cup. Under the guidance of Mark Jones, City knocked out football league opposition for the first time in their history with a 1–0 victory away at Colchester. Then, on their first appearance in the second round for 47 years, they were narrowly defeated with an injury-time goal by Notts County, in a game broadcast live on BT Sport. Good form in the cup competitions followed with victory in the Oxfordshire Senior Cup final for the first time in 15 years at the close of the season.

City's cup success continued in 2018–19 when they reached the first round proper of the FA Cup for the second consecutive season. After a 3–3 draw away to League Two Tranmere Rovers, the club were knocked out in the replay in front of the BT Sport TV cameras at Marsh Lane. The Hoops also retained the Oxfordshire Senior Cup, coming from 3–1 down to defeat Banbury United 4–3 in a thrilling final. The 2020–21 season saw them knock out another League team from the FA Cup, Northampton Town.

In October 2019, Mark Jones left his role as manager by 'mutual consent', just 48 hours after guiding the team into the FA Cup first round for the third year in succession. Former players Justin Merritt and Andy Ballard took over as the interim management team. City are an FA Charter Standard Community Club and field more than 37 teams, with sides for men, women, boys and girls.

On 14 May 2023, Oxford City were promoted to the National League for the 2023–24 season after beating Worthing 2–0 in the play-off semi-final and St. Albans City 4–0 at home in the National League South promotion play-off final to play in the fifth tier of English football for the first time in their history. In their first season at this level, however, they were relegated back to the sixth tier with five games to play.

== Grounds ==
Since 1993, Oxford City have played their home games at Marsh Lane, Marston, Oxford, Oxfordshire, OX3 0NQ. The original ground was the Whitehouse Ground, on the northern side of White House Road in southern Oxford (51.7438°N 1.2578°W), which was used from 1900 to 1988; and Cutteslowe Park (51.7911°N 1.2631°W), from 1990 to 1993.

== Players ==
=== Current squad ===
As of 27 October 2026

Note: Flags indicate national team as defined under FIFA eligibility rules; some limited exceptions apply. Players may hold more than one non-FIFA nationality.

No.	Pos.	Nation	Player
1	GK	ENG	Jonny Maxted
2	DF	ENG	Keegan Bloom
3	DF	ENG	Evan Humphries
4	MF	ENG	Josh Ashby
5	DF	GLP	Ludwig Francillette
6	DF	ENG	Darnell Johnson
7	MF	ENG	Scott Pollock
8	MF	SRB	Dejan Tetek
9	FW	ENG	Tyrone Marsh
10	MF	ENG	Zac McEachran
11	FW	ENG	Ellis Brown
12	MF	ENG	Max Smith (on loan from Watford)
13	GK	ENG	Max Treml

No.	Pos.	Nation	Player
14	FW	ENG	Matty Taylor
15	FW	ARG	Fernando Forestieri
16	MF	ENG	Alfie Potter
17	FW	ENG	Ewan Clark
18	MF	ENG	Tyrae Njogu
19	DF	ENG	Canice Carroll
21	FW	SRI	Dillon De Silva
22	DF	ENG	Deago Nelson
23	MF	ENG	Brayden Daniel
24	FW	ENG	Kauan
25	DF	ENG	Caleb Moir
26	DF	ENG	Aydin Ulas

=== Out on loan ===
Note: Flags indicate national team as defined under FIFA eligibility rules; some limited exceptions apply. Players may hold more than one non-FIFA nationality.

No.	Pos.	Nation	Player

== Club staff ==
Position	Name
Manager	Ross Jenkins
Assistant manager	Paul Robinson
Goalkeeper Coach	Ryan Clarke
First Team Coach	Jordan Piper
First Team S&C Coach	Rob Cooper
First-team analyst	Matt Wilson
Head of Medical	Jazmine Simpkin

== Honours ==
League

- National League South (level 6)
  - Play-off winners: 2023
- Southern Football League (level 7)
  - Play-off winners: 2012
- Southern Football League Division One South & West (level 8)
  - Play-off winners: 2008
- Spartan South Midlands Football League Premier Division (level 9)
  - Champions: 2005–06
- Spartan South Midlands Football League Premier Division
  - Champions: 1992–93
- Isthmian Football League Division One
  - Champions: 1995–96

Cup

- FA Amateur Cup
  - Winners: 1905–06
- Tournoi de Pâques du Stade Français
  - Winners: 1921
- Oxfordshire Senior Cup
  - Winners (36)

== Club records ==
- Highest league finish: 24th in National League, 2023–24
- Best FA Cup performance: Second round, 1969–70, 2017–18, 2020–21
- Best FA Trophy performance: Quarter-finals, 2020–21, 2024–25
- Best FA Vase performance: Finalists, 1994–95
- Best FA Amateur Cup performance: Winners, 1905–06
- Record attendance: 3,462 vs. Leicester City, 6 November 2026, FA Cup 1st Round

== Average attendances ==
Season	Attendance
2012–13	311
2013–14	277
2014–15	320
2015–16	244
2016–17	302
2017–18	319
2018–19	353
2019–20	368*
2020–21	N/A
2021–22	616
2022–23	406

- 17/21 home games were played in 2019–20
