= Mohamed Shifan (footballer, born 1998) =

Sri Lankan footballer

Personal information
- Place of birth: Sri Lanka
- Position: Forward

Team information
- Current team: Up Country Lions

Senior career*
Years	Team	Apps	(Gls)
2018–2019	Mawanella United SC		
2020–	Up Country Lions		

International career^{‡}
2021–	Sri Lanka	3	(0)
- * Club domestic league appearances and goals as of 10:40, 8 October 2021 (UTC) ‡ National team caps and goals as of 10:40, 8 October 2021 (UTC)

Mohamed Shifan is a Sri Lankan professional footballer who plays as a forward for Sri Lanka Champions League club Up Country Lions and the Sri Lanka national team.
