= Manish Dangi =

Nepalese footballer

Personal information
- Date of birth: 17 September 2001 (age 25)
- Place of birth: Kathmandu, Nepal
- Height: 1.69 m (5 ft 7 in)
- Position: Winger

Team information
- Current team: Bashundhara Kings

Youth career
- 2017: Sinheung Middle School
- 2019: Dongducheon Sinheung FC
- 2020–2021: Pocheon Citizen

Senior career*
Years	Team	Apps	(Gls)
2021	Biratnagar City	5	(0)
2021	Machhindra	9	(0)
2022–2023	Etehad Al-Reef Club		
2023	Sankata Boys	24	(4)
2023–2024	Rayong	7	(0)
2025–2026	Butwal Lumbini	6	(0)
2026–	Bashundhara Kings	0	(0)

International career^{‡}
2019	Nepal U19	5	(1)
2021–	Nepal U23	4	(0)
2021–	Nepal	39	(5)
Medal record
Representing Nepal
SAFF Championship
Runner-up	2021 Maldives
- * Club domestic league appearances and goals as of 29 August 2026 ‡ National team caps and goals as of 10 June 2025

Manish Dangi (Nepali: मनिष डाँगी; born 17 September 2001) is a Nepalese professional footballer who plays as a winger for Bashundhara Kings and the Nepal football team.

== Early life ==
Born in Kathmandu, Dangi's family moved to South Korea for better job opportunity. That is where Dangi started playing his football in 2014.

== Youth career ==
Dangi first started playing football as an elite academy player from Sinheung middle school U15 when he first moved to South Korea. He began to learn football in earnest in the fall of 2015, but due to regulations for registration as a foreign player it took almost a year for him to play in the league. He officially started to play from summer of 2016.

== Club career ==
In 2021, Dangi signed for Biratnagar City for the inaugural season of the Nepal Super League (NSL). He played five games as substitute for Biratnagar.

== International career ==
Dangi had an opportunity to take South Korean citizenship and to play in South Korea, but he rejected it and decided to play for Nepal.

Dangi played for Nepal U-19 in the 2019 SAFF U-18 Championship. He scored against Maldives in the competition. The goal was only the goal scored by Nepal in the tournament. He also appeared for Nepal in 2020 AFC U-19 Championship qualification.

In 2021, Dangi was called to a senior national team camp for the first time. He made his international debut against Iraq on 29 May 2021, and scored his first international goal. Dangi was selected in Nepal's squad for the 2021 SAFF Championship. On 1 October, Dangi scored the only goal for Nepal in a 1–0 victory over the hosts Maldives.

Dangi was called to a Nepal U-23 for 2022 AFC U-23 Asian Cup qualification. He made his U-23 debut against Indonesia U-23 in friendly game on 22 October 2021.

On 17 October 2023, in the second leg of the first round of the 2026 FIFA World Cup qualifiers, Dangi scored the only goal against Laos, securing Nepal's 2–1 aggregate victory and a place in the second round.

== Personal life ==
He was featured, alongside his brother, in a KBS Human documentary in 2021, telling about Manish's life in South Korea. Having lived in South Korea, he is fluent in Korean.

== Career statistics ==
=== International ===
As of matches played 10 June 2025.

Appearances and goals by national team and year
National team	Year	Apps	Goals
Nepal	2021	11	2
Nepal	2022	7	0
Nepal	2023	12	2
Nepal	2024	5	0
Nepal	2025	4	1
Total		39	5

=== International goals ===
No	Date	Venue	Opponent	Score	Result	Competition
1	29 May 2021	Al Fayhaa Stadium, Basra, Iraq	Iraq	2–1	2–6	Friendly
2	1 October 2021	National Football Stadium, Malé, Maldives	Maldives	1–0	1–0	2021 SAFF Championship
3	31 March 2023	Dasharath Rangasala, Kathmandu, Nepal	Laos	2–1	2–1	Friendly
4	17 October 2023	New Laos National Stadium, Vientiane, Laos	Laos	1–0	1–0	2026 FIFA World Cup qualification
5	10 June 2025	New Laos National Stadium, Vientiane, Laos	Laos	1–2	1–2	2027 AFC Asian Cup qualification
