= Aditya Chaudhary =

Nepalese footballer

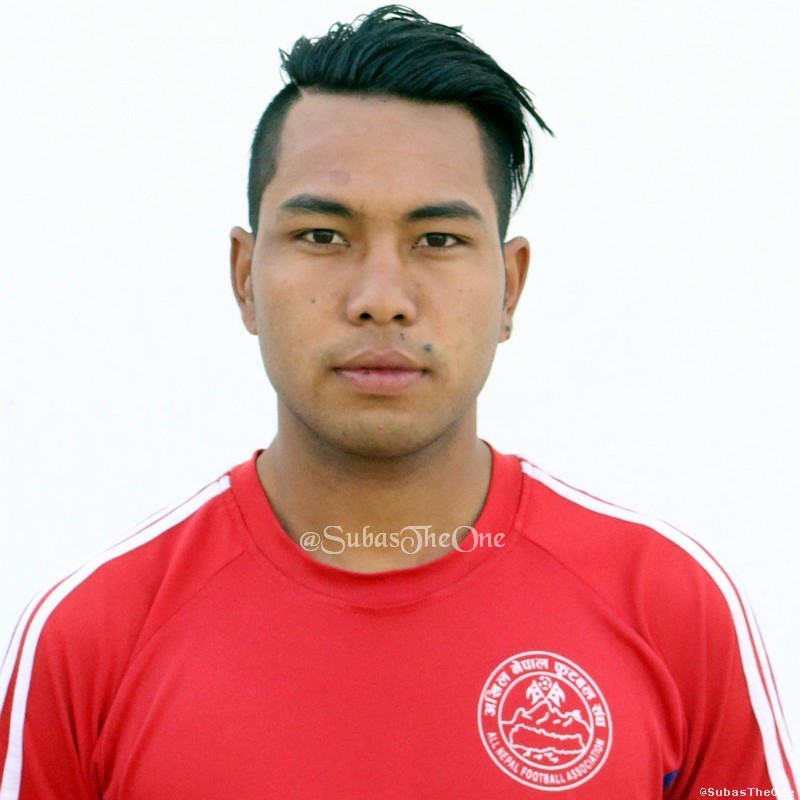

Personal information
- Full name: Aditya Chaudhary
- Date of birth: 19 April 1996 (age 30)
- Place of birth: Nepal
- Height: 1.73 m (5 ft 8 in)
- Position: Defender

Team information
- Current team: Three Star Club

Youth career
- ANFA Academy

Senior career*
Years	Team	Apps	(Gls)
2012–	Three Star Club		

International career^{‡}
2012	Nepal U17		
2013	Nepal U19	4	(0)
2014–	Nepal U23	2	(0)
2014–	Nepal	23	(0)
- * Club domestic league appearances and goals as of 11 April 2015 ‡ National team caps and goals as of 25 March 2019

Aditya Chaudhary (Nepali: आदित्य चौधरी) (born 19 April 1996) is a footballer from Nepal. He made his first appearance for the Nepal national football team on 31 October 2014.

== Club career ==
=== Three Star Club ===
After his impressive performances for the Nepalese under-17 team, Chaudhary was signed by Nepalese heavyweights Three Star Club. Three Star manager Ram Shrestha confirmed that the young defender had signed a one-year deal with the club. "Aditya Choudhary is a very good player and we feel happy to snap him for new season." Shretha told reporters "He impressed us with his defensive skills during SAFF U-16 Championship last year, we are sure he can excel his career in Mega Three Star Club." Chaudhary too was highly pleased with his new team, saying "I am happy to sign a contract with Mega Three Star, my first target is to be in the first eleven and perform my best for the team." Choudhary was set to earn a salary of 18,000 rupees per month.

=== Nepal APF ===
In 2015 Choudhary signed with Nepal APF. In February 2015 in a Rara Gold Cup match Choudhary was sent off and nine other players were yellow carded as APF surprisingly lost 1-0 to Far Western FC. Choudhary had a poor game; earlier in the same match he had a penalty kick saved by Birendra Bahadur Chand in the 18th minute.

== International career ==
=== U-19 Career ===
In October 2013 Chaudhary was called up for the 2014 AFC U-19 Championship qualification in Doha. Nepal failed to register a point as they lost all four matches.

=== U-23 Career ===
In August 2014 Chaudhary was selected for a two-part friendly matches against Bangladesh. His performance in the next match was strongly applauded.

=== Senior career ===
Chaudhary made his international debut for Nepal on 31 October 2014 coming on for Bhola Silwal in the 83rd minute. Chaudhary had a great chance to equalize at 1-0 down but shot straight at the goalkeeper, and latter conceded the Penalty kick which led to the second goal in an eventual 3-0 loss against the Philippines.
