= Sunil Roshan Appuhamy =

Sri Lankan footballer

Sunil Roshan
Personal information
- Full name: Amarasinghe Arachchilage Sunil Roshan Appuhamy
- Date of birth: 3 July 1993 (age 33)
- Place of birth: Sri Lanka
- Position: Defender

Team information
- Current team: Defenders

Senior career*
Years	Team	Apps	(Gls)
2012–2018	Colombo		
2018–	Defenders		

International career^{‡}
2016–	Sri Lanka	4	(0)
- * Club domestic league appearances and goals as of 18:11, 10 September 2021 (UTC) ‡ National team caps and goals as of 18:11, 10 September 2021 (UTC)

Amarasinghe Arachchilage Sunil Roshan Appuhamy is a Sri Lankan international footballer who plays as a defender for Defenders in the Sri Lanka Football Premier League.
