= Chameera Sajith Kumara =

Sri Lankan footballer

Personal information
- Date of birth: 31 March 1989 (age 37)
- Place of birth: Sri Lanka
- Position: Midfielder

Senior career*
Years	Team	Apps	(Gls)
2015–2019	Navy		

International career^{‡}
2014–	Sri Lanka	10	(1)
- * Club domestic league appearances and goals ‡ National team caps and goals as of 15 November 2016

Chameera Sajith Kumara (born 31 March 1989) is a Sri Lankan international footballer who plays as a midfielder.
