= Mohamed Aman (footballer) =

Yemeni footballer

Mohammed Aman
Personal information
- Date of birth: 14 April 1997 (age 29)
- Place of birth: Hadramawt Governorate, Yemen
- Position: Goalkeeper

Team information
- Current team: Al-Shaab Hadramaut

International career
Years	Team	Apps	(Gls)
2015	Yemen U-23		
2021	Yemen		

Mohammed Aman Fateh Khairalah (Arabic: محمد أمان فتح خير الله;born 14 April 1997) is a Yemeni professional footballer who plays as a goalkeeper for Yemeni club Al-Shaab Hadramaut and Yemen national team.
