= Dimitri Tagne =

Cameroonian footballer

Personal information
- Full name: Bodric Dimitri Tagne Fogueing
- Date of birth: 21 April 1997 (age 29)
- Place of birth: Cameroon
- Height: 1.78 m (5 ft 10 in)
- Position: Forward

Senior career*
| Years | Team | Apps | (Gls) |
| 2015-2016 | Petaling Jaya City | | |
| 2016–2017 | Al-Ahli Club | | |
| 2018–2022 | Colombo | | |
| 2023 | Young Elephants | | |
- * Club domestic league appearances and goals

Bodric Dimitri Tagne Fogueing, also known as Dimitri Tagne, is a Cameroonian professional footballer.

== Early years ==
Dimitri was in Malaysia when he was 13 years old and played for a youth team in Mount Kiara for three years.

== Sources ==
- http://www.colombofc.com/player/bodric-jimmy/
