= Rifkhan Mohamed =

Sri Lankan footballer

Personal information
- Full name: Mohamed Jahufar Rifkhan Mohamed
- Date of birth: 25 October 1999 (age 27)
- Place of birth: Trincomalee, Sri Lanka
- Position: Striker

Team information
- Current team: Defenders

Senior career*
Years	Team	Apps	(Gls)
2018–2020	Sri Lanka Police		
2020–	Defenders		

International career^{‡}
2018–	Sri Lanka	1	(0)
- * Club domestic league appearances and goals as of 15:17, 22 September 2021 (UTC) ‡ National team caps and goals as of 15:17, 22 September 2021 (UTC)

Rifkhan Mohamed (born 25 October 1999) is a Sri Lankan footballer who plays as a striker for Defenders Football Club of the Sri Lanka Champions League, and the Sri Lanka national football team.

== Club career ==
Mohamed began playing for Sri Lanka Police SC of the Sri Lanka Champions League in 2018. In late 2020 he moved to league rivals Defenders Football Club with the official announcement coming in February 2021.

== International career ==
Mohamed represented Sri Lanka at the youth level in 2018 AFC U-19 Championship qualification and 2020 AFC U-23 Championship qualification. He made his senior debut on 12 October 2018 in a 1–4 friendly defeat to Malaysia. In 2021 he was called up to the senior squad again for 2022 FIFA World Cup qualification and the SAFF Championship.

=== International career statistics ===
As of match played 12 October 2018.

Sri Lanka national team
Year	Apps	Goals
2018	1	0
2019	0	0
2020	0	0
2021	0	0
Total	1	0
