= Kuenga Gyeltshen =

Bhutanese footballer

Personal information
- Full name: Kuenga Gyeltshen
- Date of birth: 5 May 1992 (age 34)
- Place of birth: Bhutan
- Position: Defender

Senior career*
Years	Team	Apps	(Gls)
2015–	Druk United F.C.		

International career
2015–	Bhutan	4	(0)
- * Club domestic league appearances and goals

Kuenga Gyeltshen is a Bhutanese professional footballer who currently plays for Druk United F.C. He made his first appearance in their second qualifying round matches and also featured in the 2015 SAFF Championship.
