= Mohamed Musthaq =

Sri Lankan footballer

Personal information
- Full name: Mohamed Mohidden Mohamed Musthaq
- Date of birth: 16 December 1998 (age 27)
- Place of birth: Eravur, Sri Lanka
- Position: Midfielder

Team information
- Current team: Up Country Lions

Senior career*
Years	Team	Apps	(Gls)
2018–2020	Young Star		
2020–	Up Country Lions		

International career^{‡}
2019	Sri Lanka U23	3	(0)
2019–	Sri Lanka	1	(1)
- * Club domestic league appearances and goals as of 17:33, 21 September 2021 (UTC) ‡ National team caps and goals as of 17:33, 21 September 2021 (UTC)

Mohamed Musthaq (born 16 December 1998) is a Sri-Lankan footballer who plays as a midfielder for Up Country Lions SC of the Sri Lanka Champions League, and the Sri Lanka national football team.

== Club career ==
Mustaq played for Young Star SC from 2018 to 2020. He then joined Up Country Lions SC of the Sri Lanka Champions League.

== International career ==
Musthaq represented Sri Lanka at the youth level, making three appearances for his nation during 2020 AFC U-23 Championship qualification. He was called up to the senior national team for the first time in July 2018 for a pair of friendlies against Lithuania. He eventually made his senior debut on 31 August 2019 in a 1–5 friendly defeat to the United Arab Emirates. He scored his team's only goal in the match, his first for Sri Lanka. In 2021 he was called up to the senior squad again for 2022 FIFA World Cup qualification and the SAFF Championship.

=== International goals ===
Scores and results list Sri Lanka's goal tally first.

No.	Date	Venue	Opponent	Score	Result	Competition
1.	31 August 2019	Bahrain National Stadium, Riffa, Bahrain	United Arab Emirates	1–3	1–5	Friendly
Last updated 21 September 2021

=== International career statistics ===
As of match played 31 August 2019.

Sri Lanka national team
Year	Apps	Goals
2019	1	1
Total	1	1
