= Dhan Bahadur Biswa =

Bhutanese international footballer

Personal information
- Full name: Dhan Bahadur Biswa
- Date of birth: 6 July 1994 (age 32)
- Place of birth: Bhutan
- Position: Defender

International career
| Years | Team | Apps | (Gls) |
| 2016– | Bhutan | 1 | (0) |

Dhan Bahadur Biswa is a Bhutanese professional footballer. He made his first appearance in their final 2018 World Cup qualifying match against the Maldives, coming on as a substitute in the 87th minute.
