= Santosh Tamang =

Nepali footballer

Personal information
- Date of birth: 6 August 1994 (age 32)
- Place of birth: Lalitpur, Nepal
- Height: 1.65 m (5 ft 5 in)
- Position: Midfielder

Team information
- Current team: United FC Melbourne

Senior career*
Years	Team	Apps	(Gls)
–2015	Friends Club		
2015–2021	Nepal Army		
2021	Biratnagar City	6	(3)
2021–2022	Nepal Army	11	(1)
2022	Jhapa		
2022–	United FC Melbourne		

International career^{‡}
2021–	Nepal	19	(0)
- * Club domestic league appearances and goals as of 08:03, 15 September 2021 (UTC) ‡ National team caps and goals as of 08:03, 15 September 2021 (UTC)

Santosh Tamang (born 6 August 1994) is a Nepali footballer who plays as a midfielder for Australian club United FC Melbourne and the Nepal national team.
