= Dillon De Silva =

Association football player (born 2002)

Personal information
- Full name: Dillon Senan De Silva
- Date of birth: 18 April 2002 (age 24)
- Place of birth: Camden Town, England
- Height: 1.76 m (5 ft 9 in)
- Position: Winger

Team information
- Current team: Tamworth

Youth career
- 2013–2016: Tottenham Hotspur
- 2016–2017: Barking
- 2017–2022: Queens Park Rangers

Senior career*
| Years | Team | Apps | (Gls) |
| 2022–2023 | Queens Park Rangers | 0 | (0) |
| 2022–2023 | → Torquay United (loan) | 19 | (3) |
| 2023–2024 | Torquay United | 20 | (2) |
| 2024 | Wealdstone | 8 | (2) |
| 2024–2026 | Sutton United | 28 | (1) |
| 2025 | → Tamworth (loan) | 1 | (1) |
| 2025–2026 | → Dagenham & Redbridge (loan) | 5 | (0) |
| 2026 | → Maidenhead United (loan) | 16 | (1) |
| 2026– | Oxford City | 0 | (0) |

International career^{‡}
| 2021– | Sri Lanka | 31 | (5) |
- * Club domestic league appearances and goals as of 04:46, 2 May 2026 (UTC) ‡ National team caps and goals as of 5 October 2026 (UTC)

Dillon Senan De Silva (Sinhala: ඩිලෝන් සේනාන් ද සිල්වා) (born 18 April 2002) is a professional footballer who plays as a winger for Oxford City. Born in England, he plays for the Sri Lanka national team.

== Club career ==
De Silva started his youth career at Tottenham Hotspur, where he spent three years. Prior to joining Tottenham, he also had unsuccessful trials at Arsenal. He joined the youth academy of Queens Park Rangers in 2017. In July 2022, he signed a contract extension with the club until June 2023.

On 8 October 2022, De Silva joined National League side Torquay United on a loan deal. On 1 March 2023, he was recalled by his parent club. He departed Queens Park Rangers at the end of the 2022–23 season.

On 3 August 2023, De Silva returned to now National League South club Torquay United on a permanent basis. He was released by the club on 29 February 2024.

On 1 March 2024, De Silva joined National League club Wealdstone on a short term deal.

On 24 May 2024, he joined fellow National League club Sutton United. In October 2025, he joined Tamworth on a one-month loan. On 4 December, he joined Dagenham & Redbridge on loan until the end of January 2026. He then joined Maidenhead United on loan for the rest of the season, before being released by Sutton.

De Silva joined Oxford City ahead of the 2026–27 season.

== International career ==
Born in England, De Silva represents Sri Lanka in international football. In May 2021, he received his first call-up for the 2022 FIFA World Cup qualifiers against Lebanon and South Korea. He made his debut on 5 June 2021, coming on as a substitute in a 3–2 defeat against Lebanon.

== Career statistics ==
=== International ===
As of match played 5 October 2026

Appearances and goals by national team and year
| National team | Year | Apps | Goals |
|---|---|---|---|
| Sri Lanka | 2021 | 9 | 1 |
| Sri Lanka | 2022 | 3 | 0 |
| Sri Lanka | 2024 | 6 | 1 |
| Sri Lanka | 2025 | 7 | 1 |
| Sri Lanka | 2026 | 6 | 2 |
| Total | | 31 | 5 |

Scores and results list Sri Lanka's goal tally first, score column indicates score after each De Silva goal.

List of international goals scored by Dillon De Silva
| No. | Date | Venue | Opponent | Score | Result | Competition |
|---|---|---|---|---|---|---|
| 1 | 4 October 2021 | National Football Stadium, Malé, Maldives | Nepal | 2–3 | 2–3 | 2021 SAFF Championship |
| 2 | 25 March 2024 | Colombo Racecourse, Colombo, Sri Lanka | Bhutan | 1–0 | 2–0 | 2024 FIFA Series |
| 3 | 10 June 2025 | Colombo Racecourse, Colombo, Sri Lanka | Chinese Taipei | 2–0 | 3–1 | 2027 AFC Asian Cup qualification |
| 4 | 27 September 2026 | Stade Linité, Victoria, Seychelles | Seychelles | 3–0 | 3–0 | Friendly |
| 5 | 30 September 2026 | Stade Linité, Victoria, Seychelles | Seychelles | 1–0 | 2–0 | Friendly |
