= Suman Lama =

Nepali footballer

Personal information
- Date of birth: 9 March 1996 (age 30)
- Place of birth: Nepal
- Height: 1.65 m (5 ft 5 in)
- Position: Forward

Team information
- Current team: Butwal Lumbini
- Number: 9

Senior career*
Years	Team	Apps	(Gls)
2013–2018	Sankata Boys		
2018–2021	Nepal Police		
2021–	Butwal Lumbini		

International career^{‡}
2018	Nepal U23	3	(0)
2019–	Nepal	21	(1)
- * Club domestic league appearances and goals as of 08:03, 15 September 2021 (UTC) ‡ National team caps and goals as of 08:03, 15 September 2021 (UTC)

Suman Lama (born 9 March 1996) is a Nepali footballer who plays as a forward for Nepali club Butwal Lumbini and the Nepal national team. He has also played for his country with the Nepal U23 team.

== International goals ==
No.	Date	Venue	Opponent	Score	Result	Competition
1.	4 October 2021	National Stadium, Malé, Maldives	Sri Lanka	1–0	3–2	2021 SAFF Championship
