= Rajin Dhimal =

Nepali footballer

Ranjit Dhimal
Personal information
- Full name: Ranjit Dhimal
- Date of birth: 4 April 1991 (age 35)
- Place of birth: Nepal
- Positions: Defender; midfielder

Team information
- Current team: Biratnagar City FC

Senior career*
Years	Team	Apps	(Gls)
2014–2015	Three Star Club	4	
2015–2018	Armed Police Force		
2018	Three Star Club	2	(1)
2021	Biratnagar City FC	6	(1)

International career^{‡}
2013–	Nepal u-23	?	(0)
2014–	Nepal	10	(0)
- * Club domestic league appearances and goals ‡ National team caps and goals as of 17 December 2015

Ranjit Dhimal (Nepali: रञ्जित धिमाल; born 4 April 1991), also known as Rajin Dhimal, is a Nepali professional footballer. He made his first appearance for the Nepal national football team on 31 October 2014. He plays for TSC.

== Club career ==
Dhimal started his career with Radhika Secondary School in Morang District. In 2009 Radhika won the Coca-Cola Cup Inter-school National Football Tournament with Dhimal scoring in the penalty shootout win over Janak Memorial Boarding School also of Morang. As the victors Radhika were awarded the 200,000 rupees cash prize.

In 2009/10 Dhimal played for Three Star Club
In 2011 Dhimal joined APF
In 2013 Dhimal Joined NRT
In 2014 Dhimal joined Machhindra FC
In 2015 Dhimal joined Three Star Club.

=== Biratnagar City ===
Ranjit Dhimal joined Biratnagar City as their marquee player for the inaugural season of Nepal Super League 2021. He scored 1 goal in 6 matches. He also won the Super Player of the Match against F.C. Chitwan.

== International career ==
Dhmal had previously been selected for the Nepal national under-23 football team. Dhimal played at the 2014 Asian Games Men's Tournament as Nepal crashed out with three defeats.

In 2014, Dhimal was selected to play in a Friendly Match against the Philippines. He came on for Bimal Magar in the 72nd minute.

== Trophy ==
Nepal

- 2016 AFC Solidarity Cup
