= Kezang Wangdi =

Bhutanese footballer

Personal information
- Full name: Kezang Wangdi
- Date of birth: 1 January 1997 (age 29)
- Place of birth: Phimsong, Bhutan
- Height: 1.75 m (5 ft 9 in)
- Position: Defender

Senior career*
Years	Team	Apps	(Gls)
2015–	Druk Star		

International career
2015–	Bhutan	4	(0)
- * Club domestic league appearances and goals

Kezang Wangdi is a Bhutanese professional footballer who currently plays for Druk Star. He made his first appearance in their friendly match against Cambodia and also featured in the 2015 SAFF Championship and their second qualifying round matches.
