= Mohammed Mubarak =

Qatari footballer (born 1984)

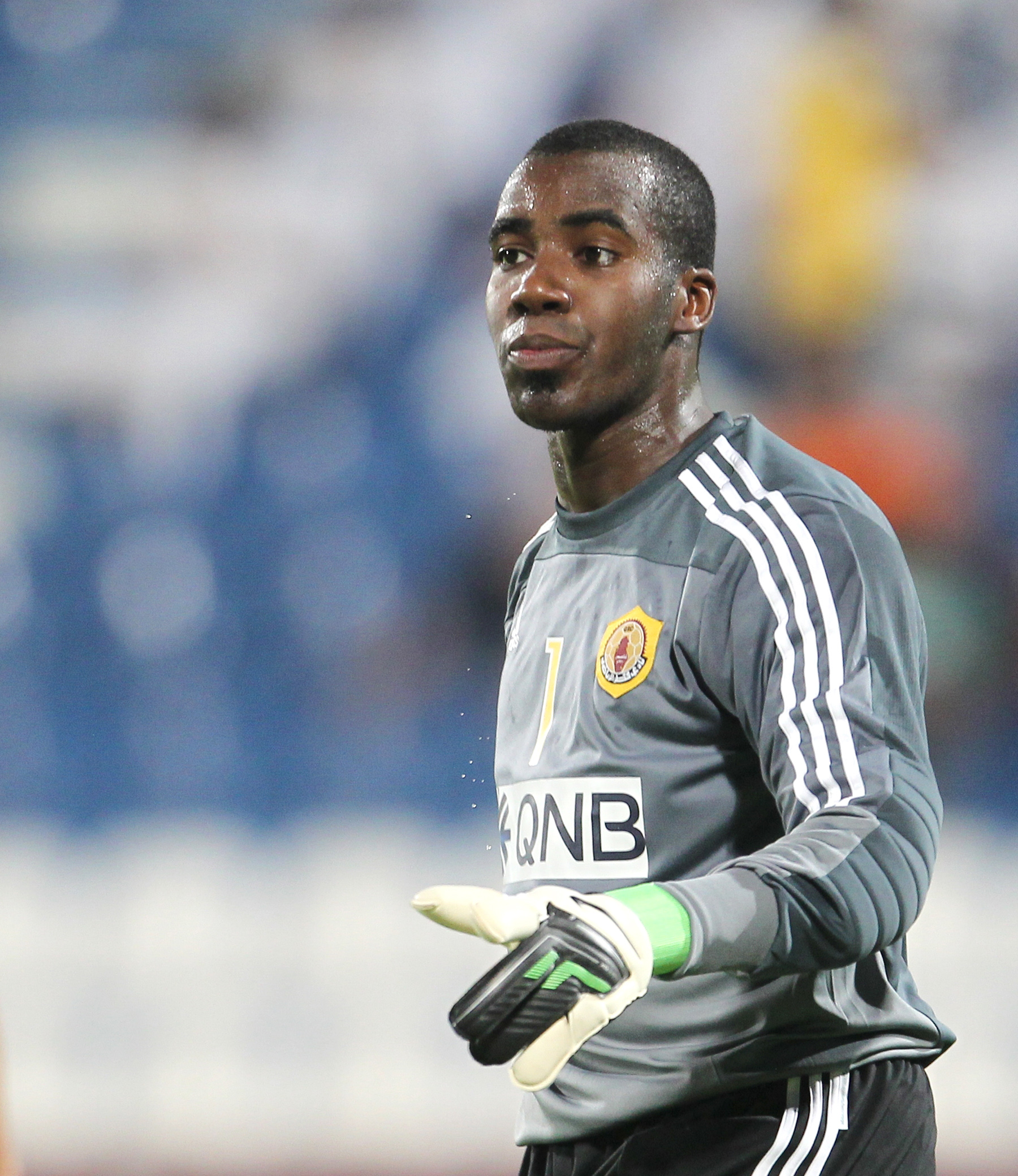

Personal information
- Full name: Mohammed Mubarak Bu Dawood
- Date of birth: 11 August 1984 (age 42)
- Place of birth: Qatar
- Height: 1.81 m (5 ft 11 1/2 in)
- Position: Goalkeeper

Senior career*
| Years | Team | Apps | (Gls) |
| 2005–2017 | Qatar SC | 171 | (0) |
| 2016–2017 | → Al Arabi (loan) | 3 | (0) |
| 2017–2018 | Al Ahli | | |
| 2018–2019 | Al-Shamal | | |
| 2019–2020 | Al-Waab | | |

International career
| 2009–2011 | Qatar | 3 | (0) |
- * Club domestic league appearances and goals

Mohammed Mubarak (born 11 August 1984) is a Qatari professional footballer who is a goalkeeper. His brother, Meshal Mubarak, is also a footballer and has represented the national team.

== Club career statistics ==
Statistics accurate as of 21 August 2011

| Club | Season | League | League | | Cup^{1} | | League Cup^{2} | | Continental^{3} | | Total | |
| Club | Season | League | Apps | Goals | Apps | Goals | Apps | Goals | Apps | Goals | Apps | Goals |
|---|---|---|---|---|---|---|---|---|---|---|---|---|
| Qatar SC | 2004–05 | QSL | 1 | 0 | | | | | | | | |
| Qatar SC | 2005–06 | QSL | 0 | 0 | | | | | | | | |
| Qatar SC | 2006–07 | QSL | 0 | 0 | | | | | | | | |
| Qatar SC | 2007–08 | QSL | 0 | 0 | | | | | | | | |
| Qatar SC | 2008–09 | QSL | 24 | 0 | | | | | | | | |
| Qatar SC | 2009–10 | QSL | 21 | 0 | | | | | | | | |
| Qatar SC | 2010–11 | QSL | 19 | 0 | | | | | | | | |
| Qatar SC | 2011-12 | QSL | 14 | 0 | | | | | | | | |
| Qatar SC | Total | | 79 | 0 | | | | | | | | |
| Career total | | | 79 | 0 | | | | | | | | |

^{1}Includes Emir of Qatar Cup.

^{2}Includes Sheikh Jassem Cup.

^{3}Includes AFC Champions League.
