= Marvin Hamilton =

Sri Lankan former footballer (born 1988)

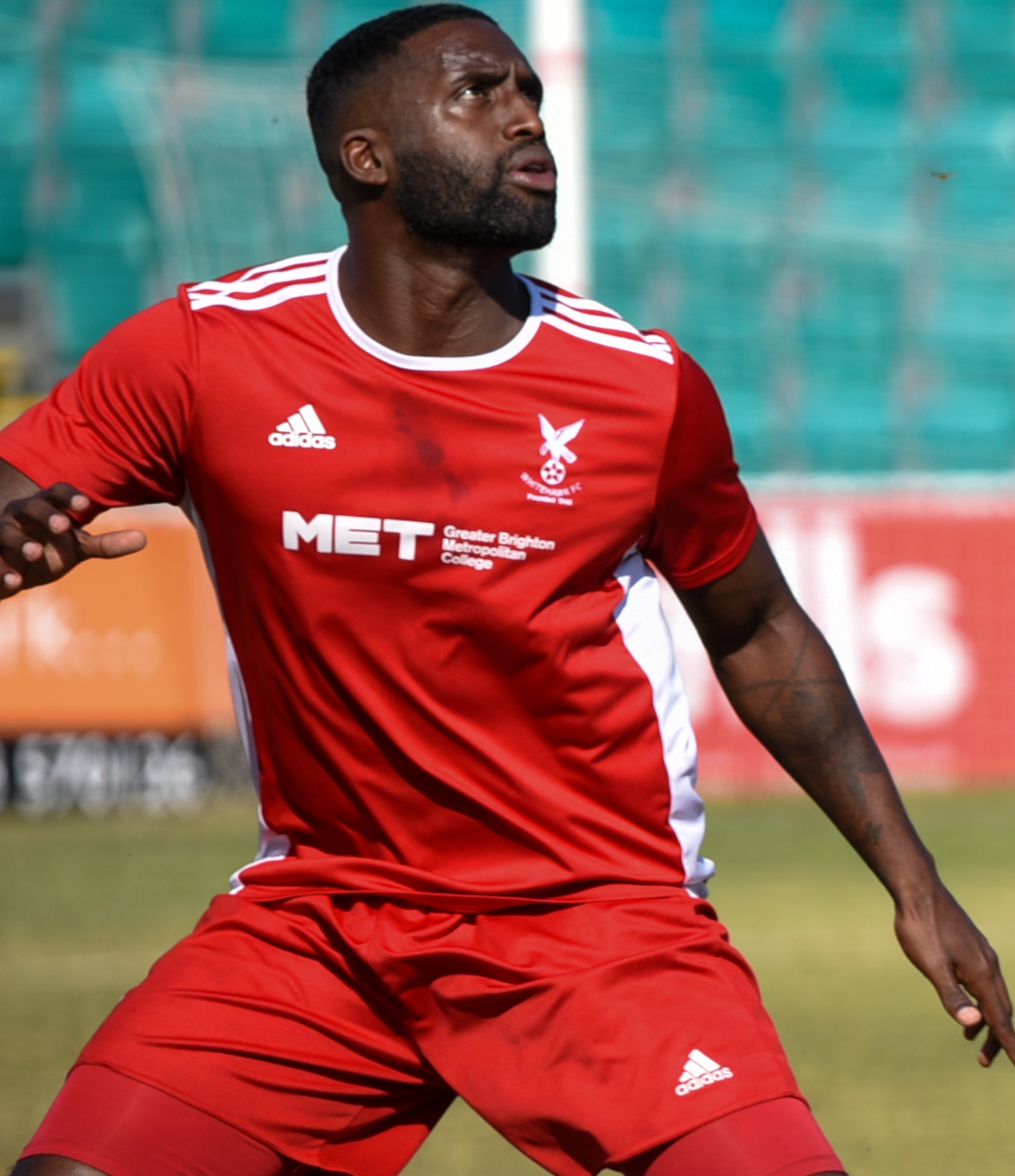
- Hamilton playing for Whitehawk in 2019

Personal information
- Full name: Marvin Hamilton-Omole
- Date of birth: 8 October 1988 (age 38)
- Place of birth: Leytonstone, England
- Height: 6 ft 0 in (1.83 m)
- Position: Midfielder

Youth career
- 2005–2007: Gillingham

Senior career*
Years	Team	Apps	(Gls)
2007–2008	Gillingham	15	(0)
2008	→ Folkestone Invicta (loan)	4	(2)
2008	Dover Athletic	4	(0)
2010	APEP	26	(5)
2011–2012	Hemel Hempstead Town	4	(0)
2012–2013	Eastbourne Borough	33	(0)
2013	Southern Stars	5	(4)
2013	Albany Creek	8	(5)
2014	Ware	6	(1)
2014–2015	Eastbourne Borough	35	(2)
2015	Whitehawk	8	(1)
2015	Dartford	1	(0)
2015	VCD Athletic	8	(0)
2015–2016	Eastbourne Borough	12	(0)
2016–2017	Whitehawk	19	(2)
2017	→ Margate (loan)	10	(0)
2017–2018	Ware	11	(1)
2018	Haringey Borough	1	(0)
2018–2019	Eastbourne Borough	16	(0)
2019–2021	Whitehawk	33	(3)
2021	Burgess Hill Town	3	(0)
2021–2022	Sittingbourne	8	(0)
2022–2023	Hythe Town	32	(1)
2023	FC Baresi	29	(10)
2023–	Hythe Town	1	(0)

International career^{‡}
2021–2022	Sri Lanka	10	(2)
- * Club domestic league appearances and goals as of 10 December 2023 ‡ National team caps and goals as of 07:28, 9 June 2025 (UTC)

Marvin Hamilton-Omole (born 8 October 1988) is a professional footballer who plays for Hythe Town. Born in England, he represented the Sri Lanka national team.

Born in England to a Nigerian father and a Sri Lankan mother, Hamilton began his career with Gillingham and has subsequently gone on to play for a number of non-League clubs in the south of England, as well as spending brief spells playing in Cyprus, Australia and the USA.

== Career ==
=== Club career ===
After junior trials with Arsenal, Hamilton also played for Waltham Forest and Ridgeway Rovers before joining Gillingham as a youth player in July 2005. He signed as a professional on a one-year contract on the eve of the 2007–08 season and made his first-team debut as a substitute in an away defeat to Luton Town on 25 August 2007. After a change of manager and a loan spell at Folkestone Invicta, he was released by Gillingham on 31 March 2008 and joined Dover Athletic. Hamilton started the 2008–09 season as a trialist at AFC Wimbledon and Lincoln City before signing for Cypriot side APEP in January 2010. Hamilton played for Hemel Hempstead Town and then joined Conference South club Eastbourne Borough on 24 February 2012.

Hamilton then had a brief spell playing in Australia, first in the Victoria Premier for Southern Stars (now known as Dingley Stars) before moving in the July 2013 transfer window to Albany Creek in the Brisbane Premier League. After a trial at Chelmsford City, Hamilton joined Isthmian League club Ware, where he scored the league goal of the month in April 2014.

Hamilton returned to The Sports for the 2014–15 season before being released in February 2015 and signing for Whitehawk until the end of the season. After a spell playing in the US, Hamilton signed briefly for Dartford on 6 August 2015 and then Isthmian League side VCD Athletic before re-joining Eastbourne Borough for the third time on 30 October.

Hamilton then re-signed for Whitehawk for the start of the 2016–17 season.

He re-signed for Whitehawk for the start of the 2019–20 season but announced he was leaving at the end of the curtailed 2020–21 season, to pursue opportunities in Sri Lanka.

In September 2022, Hamilton signed for Hythe Town, but missed the Isthmian League South East Division play-off final defeat against his former club Whitehawk through injury. He then left Reachfields to sign for FC Baresi in the Essex Alliance Football League Senior Division (step 7), returning to Hythe Town in November 2023.

=== International career ===
Hamilton was eligible to represent England, Nigeria and Sri Lanka. He was first called up to the Sri Lankan national team, for which he qualifies through his mother, on 7 May 2019. This was for the upcoming FIFA World Cup Qatar 2022 & AFC Asian Cup 2023 Preliminary Joint Qualification Round 1. However, he could not make it to the Sri Lankan squad at that time due to certain formalities and procedures being uncompleted. He played in a friendly warmup match against Qatar in 2018.

In May 2021, he received a call-up from the Football Federation of Sri Lanka to play in the 2022 FIFA World Cup qualifiers against Lebanon and South Korea. He made his senior international debut on 5 June 2021, in a 3–2 defeat against Lebanon. Then on 4 October, Hamilton scored his first goal against Nepal in a 3–2 defeat at the 2021 SAFF Championship.

=== Coaching career ===
Hamilton began his coaching journey after completing his UEFA B Licence in 2015. The following year, he joined the Leyton Orient Academy, where he spent a season working with youth players and developing his coaching methodology. In subsequent years, Hamilton broadened his experience through a placement scheme with The Football Association, where he had a stint at the Queens Park Rangers Academy, further sharpening his skills in youth development and elite training environments. In late 2024, Hamilton took his coaching credentials abroad and managed Scottland, a first-division side in Zimbabwe. During his tenure from October to December 2024, he led the team to an unbeaten record of 12 wins from 12 matches, securing the league championship.

As of 2025, Hamilton was enrolled on the UEFA A Licence course, part of the Seniors Pro pathway. He joined Grays Athletic's coaching staff in September.

== Career statistics ==
=== International ===
Appearances and goals by national team and year
National team	Year	Apps	Goals
Sri Lanka	2021	10	2
Total		10	2

Scores and results list Sri Lanka's goal tally first, score column indicates score after each Hamilton goal.

List of international goals scored by Marvin Hamilton
No.	Date	Venue	Opponent	Score	Result	Competition	Ref.
1	4 October 2021	National Football Stadium, Malé, Maldives	Nepal	1–2	2–3	2021 SAFF Championship	
2	19 November 2021	Colombo Racecourse, Colombo, Sri Lanka	Seychelles	1–0	3–3	Friendly	
