= Zohar Mohamed Zarwan =

Sri Lankan footballer

Johar Mohamed Zarwan
Personal information
- Full name: Johar Mohamed Zarwan
- Date of birth: 23 April 1996 (age 30)
- Place of birth: Colombo, Sri Lanka
- Position: Midfielder

Team information
- Current team: Colombo
- Number: 10

Senior career*
Years	Team	Apps	(Gls)
2016–17	Colombo		

International career^{‡}
2015–	Sri Lanka	16	(1)
- * Club domestic league appearances and goals ‡ National team caps and goals as of 16:24, 6 April 2015 (UTC)

Johar Mohamed Zarwan (born 23 April 1996) is a Sri Lankan professional footballer who plays as a midfielder for Colombo.

== International career ==
=== International goals ===
Scores and results list Sri Lanka's goal tally first.

Goal	Date	Venue	Opponent	Score	Result	Competition
1.	26 August 2014	Stade Linité, Victoria, Seychelles	Seychelles	1–1	2–1	Friendly
