= Subash Madushan =

Sri Lankan footballer

Personal information
- Full name: Subash Madushan
- Date of birth: 31 May 1990 (age 36)
- Place of birth: Sri Lanka
- Position: Defender

Team information
- Current team: Navy SC

Senior career*
Years	Team	Apps	(Gls)
2014–	Navy SC		

International career^{‡}
2014–	Sri Lanka	15	(1)
- * Club domestic league appearances and goals ‡ National team caps and goals as of 13 September 2018

Subash Madushan is a Sri Lankan international footballer who plays as a defender for Navy SC in the Sri Lanka Football Premier League.

== International career ==
=== International goals ===
Scores and results list Sri Lanka's goal tally first.

Goal	Date	Venue	Opponent	Score	Result	Competition
1.	17 March 2015	Changlimithang Stadium, Thimphu, Bhutan	Bhutan	1–1	1–2	2018 FIFA World Cup qualification
