= Kavindu Ishan =

Sri Lankan footballer (born 1992)

Personal information
- Date of birth: 17 October 1992 (age 34)
- Place of birth: Sri Lanka
- Height: 1.67 m (5 ft 6 in)
- Position: Midfielder

Team information
- Current team: Up Country Lions

Senior career*
Years	Team	Apps	(Gls)
2010–11	Don Bosco		
2012–20	Air Force		
2020–	Up Country Lions		

International career
2010–	Sri Lanka	39	(1)
- * Club domestic league appearances and goals

Kavindu Ishan is a Sri Lankan professional footballer who plays as a midfielder for Air Force in the Sri Lanka Football Premier League.

== International career ==
=== International goals ===
Scores and results list Sri Lanka's goal tally first.

Goal	Date	Venue	Opponent	Score	Result	Competition
1.	9 November 2016	Sarawak State Stadium, Kuching, Malaysia	Macau	1–0	1–1	2016 AFC Solidarity Cup
