= 2021 SAFF Championship =

Tournament details
- Host country: Maldives
- Dates: 1–16 October
- Teams: 5 (from 1 sub-confederation)
- Venue: 1 (in 1 host city)

Final positions
- Champions: India (8th title)
- Runners-up: Nepal

Tournament statistics
- Matches played: 11
- Goals scored: 22 (2 per match)
- Top scorer(s): (India) Sunil Chhetri (5 goals)
- Best player: (India) Sunil Chhetri
- Fair play award: Maldives

The 2021 SAFF Championship, known as Ooredoo SAFF Championship 2021 for sponsorship reasons, was the thirteenth edition of the SAFF Championship, the biennial international men's football championship of South Asia organised by South Asian Football Federation (SAFF). Initially, it was decided to be hosted by Pakistan in 2020, but was postponed to September 2021 in Bangladesh. However, the tournament was postponed again to October due to the COVID-19 pandemic, with Maldives as host.

== Host selection ==
On 11 April 2018, SAFF decided to allow Pakistan to host the tournament after the restoration of Pakistan Football Federation's membership by FIFA and since then it would be country's first international football tournaments. However, on 15 September 2019, SAFF president Kazi Salahuddin and general secretary Anwarul Haque Helal along with representatives of seven member countries decided to host the regional tournament in Bangladesh. This was to be the last edition to be held in even years, as it was decided that the subsequent editions would be held in odd years.

However, due to the COVID-19 pandemic, the tournament was postponed from its original date of 2020 to 2021, and it was supposed to be held in September 2021. Later, Bangladesh withdrew from hosting due to the COVID-19 pandemic and lack of sponsors, after which Nepalese Prime Minister KP Sharma Oli asked All Nepal Football Association (ANFA) to "initiate the process" of hosting the tournament in Nepal. In July, the ANFA received an offer to host the tournament. Meanwhile, the Football Association of Maldives submitted their bid to host the tournament. On 9 August 2021, Maldives was declared as the hosts after an online meeting of the executive committee.

== Participating nations ==
The Pakistan Football Federation was sanctioned by FIFA in April 2021, hence they were ineligible to participate in the competition. Bhutan initially abstained from participation as their government refused to permit the national football team to travel abroad. However, Bhutan's withdrawal was only confirmed when the fixtures were released on 18 August 2021.

Country	Appearance	Previous best performance	FIFA ranking September 2021
Bangladesh	12th	Champions (2003)	189
India	13th	Champions (Seven times) (Note: India has won in 1993, 1997, 1999, 2005, 2009, 2011 and 2015.)	107
Maldives	11th	Champions (2008, 2018)	158
Nepal	13th	Third-Place (1993)	168
Sri Lanka	13th	Champions (1995)	205

=== Squads ===
For the list of squads that appeared in the tournament, see 2021 SAFF Championship squads.

== Venue ==
The National Football Stadium in capital Malé hosted all the matches.

Malé	2021 SAFF Championship is located in Maldives
National Football Stadium	2021 SAFF Championship is located in Maldives
Capacity: 11,850	2021 SAFF Championship is located in Maldives

== Officials ==
Referees

- (Iraq) Yousif Saeed Hassan
- (Kuwait) Ammar Ashkanani
- (Saudi Arabia) Majed Al-Shamrani
- (Syria) Feras Taweel
- (Tajikistan) Sajëçon Zayniddinov
- (Uzbekistan) Akhrol Riskullaev

Assistant Referees

- (Bangladesh) Ahmed Sabah
- (Iraq) Ahmed Sabah Qasim Al-Baghadi
- (Kuwait) Yaquob Al-Mutairi
- (Saudi Arabia) Omar Ali Al-Jamal
- (Syria) Mohamad Kazzaz
- (Tajikistan) Farhod Kuralov
- (Uzbekistan) Husniddin Shodmonov

== Group stage ==
After the suspension of Pakistan and the withdrawal of Bhutan, the format was changed to a single group round robin format where the top two teams advance to the final.

=== Table ===
Pos	Team	Pld	W	D	L	GF	GA	GD	Pts	Qualification
1	India	4	2	2	0	5	2	+3	8	Advance to the final
2	Nepal	4	2	1	1	5	4	+1	7	Advance to the final
3	Maldives (H)	4	2	0	2	4	4	0	6	
4	Bangladesh	4	1	2	1	3	4	−1	5	
5	Sri Lanka	4	0	1	3	2	5	−3	1	

Source: Soccerway
Rules for classification: 1) Points; 2) Head to Head; 3) Goal difference; 4) Goals scored
(H) Hosts

=== Matches ===
1 October 2021
16:00

Sri Lanka	0–1	Bangladesh
	Report	Barman 56' (pen.)

National Football Stadium, Malé
Attendance: 2,500
Referee: Feras Taweel (Syria)
1 October 2021
21:00

Nepal	1–0	Maldives
Dangi 86'	Report

National Football Stadium, Malé
Attendance: 5,000
Referee: Akhrol Riskullayev (Uzbekistan)

4 October 2021
16:00

Bangladesh	1–1	India
Arafat 74'	Report	Chhetri 26'

National Football Stadium, Malé
Referee: Majed Al-Shamrani (Saudi Arabia)
4 October 2021
21:00

Sri Lanka	2–3	Nepal
Hamilton 57'; De Silva 90+4' (pen.)	Report	S. Lama 33'; Bista 51'; Ghalan 86'

National Football Stadium, Malé
Referee: Ammar Ashkanani (Kuwait)

7 October 2021
16:00

India	0–0	Sri Lanka
	Report

National Football Stadium, Malé
Referee: Sajëçon Zajniddinov (Tajikistan)
7 October 2021
21:00

Maldives	2–0	Bangladesh
Mohamed 55'; Ashfaq 74' (pen.)	Report

National Football Stadium, Malé
Referee: Yousif Saeed Hassan (Iraq)

10 October 2021
16:00

Maldives	1–0	Sri Lanka
Ashfaq 6'	Report

National Football Stadium, Malé
Attendance: 5,000
Referee: Majed Al-Shamrani (Saudi Arabia)
10 October 2021
21:00

Nepal	0–1	India
	Report	Chhetri 82'

National Football Stadium, Malé
Referee: Yousif Saeed Hassan (Iraq)

13 October 2021
16:00

Bangladesh	1–1	Nepal
Reza 9'	Report	Bista 88' (pen.)

National Football Stadium, Malé
Referee: Akhrol Riskullaev (Uzbekistan)
13 October 2021
21:00

India	3–1	Maldives
M. Singh 33'; Chhetri 62', 71'	Report	Ashfaq 45' (pen.)

National Football Stadium, Malé
Attendance: 5,000
Referee: Ammar Ashkanani (Kuwait)

== Final ==
16 October 2021
20:00

India	3–0	Nepal
Chhetri 49'; Wangjam 50'; Samad 90+1'	Report

National Football Stadium, Malé
Referee: Majed Al-Shamrani (Saudi Arabia)

== Champion ==
SAFF Championship 2021

India
Eighth title

== Awards ==
Most Valuable Player	Top Scorer	Fair Play
(India) Sunil Chhetri	(India) Sunil Chhetri	Maldives

=== Goalscorers ===
There were 22 goals scored in 11 matches, for an average of 2 goals per match.

5 goals

- (India) Sunil Chhetri

3 goals

- (Maldives) Ali Ashfaq

2 goals

- (Nepal) Anjan Bista

1 goal

- (Bangladesh) Yeasin Arafat
- (Bangladesh) Topu Barman
- (Bangladesh) Sumon Reza
- (India) Manvir Singh
- (India) Sahal Abdul Samad
- (India) Suresh Singh Wangjam
- (Maldives) Hamza Mohamed
- (Nepal) Manish Dangi
- (Nepal) Ayush Ghalan
- (Nepal) Suman Lama
- (Sri Lanka) Dillon De Silva
- (Sri Lanka) Marvin Hamilton

Source: Soccerway

== Prize money ==
Prize money amounts were announced in 2021.

Position	Amount (USD)
Champions	50,000
Runner-up	25,000
Total	75,000

== Broadcasting rights ==
Country	Broadcaster
Bangladesh	T Sports
India	Eurosport
Maldives	Yes TV
Nepal	Action Sports
Sri Lanka	Supreme TV and Football SriLanka TV
