= Biratnagar City FC =

Nepali association football club

Biratnagar City
- Full name: Biratnagar City Football Club
- Short name: BFC
- Founded: 2021; 5 years ago
- Ground: Sahid Rangsala
- Capacity: 15,000
- Owner: Biratnagar City FC Pvt. Ltd
- CEO: Subhashish Koirala
- League: Nepal Super League
- 2021: Nepal Super League, 6th of 7
- Website: http://www.biratnagarcityfc.com/
Home colours	Away colours

Biratnagar City Football Club is a Nepali professional franchise football club based in Biratnagar. The club has competed in the Nepal Super League, the top flight football league in Nepal.

== History ==
The club was formed in March 2021 after the establishment of Nepal Super League, the first ever franchise football league in Nepal, under the supervision of All Nepal Football Association (ANFA). The club played their first match on 25 April 2021 against Dhangadhi. Following a promising start, they failed to show consistency and finished in the 6th place, failing to reach the second part of the tournament. In the second edition of the tournament, Biratnagar City chose not to play in the tournament.

== Honours ==
- Birat Gold Cup
  - Champions (1): 2023

== Squad (2022) ==
Note: Flags indicate national team as defined under FIFA eligibility rules; some limited exceptions apply. Players may hold more than one non-FIFA nationality.

No.	Pos.	Nation	Player
—	GK	NEP	Deep Karki
—	GK	NEP	Rohit Karki
—	DF	NEP	Ashok Khawas
—	DF	NEP	Nir Kumar Rai
—	DF	NEP	Anjan Rai
—	DF	NEP	Saroj Tamang
—	DF	ROU	Cătălin Sîrbu

No.	Pos.	Nation	Player
—	DF	NEP	Bijay Dhimal
23	DF	NEP	Ranjit Dhimal
—	MF	NEP	Pradip Lama
—	MF	NEP	Prakash Budhathoki
—	MF	NEP	Awas Lamichhane
7	FW	NEP	Manish Dangi
10	FW	NEP	Milan Rai

== Technical staff (2021) ==
As of 16 April 2021

Role	Name
Head coach	(Nepal) Bishnu Gurung
Assistant coach	(Nepal) Nishan Shrestha
Team manager	(Nepal) Mukund Agarwal
Director of football	(Nepal) Sonam Ghale
Performance analyst	(India) Aalok Yadav
Physio	(Nepal) Anish Budhathoki
Kit manager	(Nepal) Bibek Rai

== Head coaching record ==
As of 8 May 2021

Coach	From	To	P	W	D	L	GS	GA	%W
(India) Yan Law	20 March 2021	31 May 2021	6	2	1	3	11	12	33.33

P – Total of played matches W – Won matches D – Drawn matches L – Lost matches GS – Goals scored GA – Goals against
%W – Percentage of matches won

== Sponsors ==
Period	Kit Manufacturer	Shirt Sponsor	Sponsor	Hospitality partner	Fitness Partner
2021	SIX5SIX	Janaki Water Tank	Kantipur Valley College; Zenith International College; Shree Medical and Technical College	Royal Singi Hotel	TC1 EMS Nepal
