= Up Country Lions SC =

Sri Lankan football club

Up Country Lions
- Full name: Up Country Lions Sports Club
- Nickname: The Lions
- Founded: 2011; 15 years ago
- Ground: Jayathilake Stadium, Nawalapitiya
- Capacity: 5,000
- Chairman: M.S.M Rishard(Owner of Dinemore)
- League: Sri Lanka Super League
- 2021–22: 5th

Up Country Lions Sports Club is a Sri Lankan professional football club based in Nawalapitiya. They play in the top tier of Sri Lankan football, the Sri Lanka Super League.
