= Nepal national football B team =

Nepal B
- Nickname(s): Nepal Blue; Nepal XI; ANFA XI
- Association: All Nepal Football Association
- Confederation: AFC
- Sub-confederation: SAFF (South Asia)
- Head coach: Baiju Kapali
- Captain: Basanta Gauchan
- Home stadium: N/A

First international
- Bangladesh Army 0–2 Nepal B (Kathmandu, Nepal; January, 2000)

The Nepal national football B team (sometimes referred to as Nepal Blue) is a secondary football team run occasionally as support for the Nepal national football team, who are also known as Nepal Red when the two teams play simultaneously. At times Nepal B have played other nations' full teams; they have also played matches against 'B' teams from other football associations.

== History ==
During the 1987 Quaid-E-Azam International Cup, Nepal entered a second string team under the title 'Nepal XI', as the full national team was playing Olympic qualifying matches during this period.

Nepal Blue first made their debut at the 2000 ANFA Coca-Cola Invitational Tournament (along with the A-team, Nepal Red, who were coached by Stephen Constantine). Nepal Blue were drawn into Group A, while Nepal Red ended up in Group B. The tournament began well for Nepal Blue, who won their first match against the Bangladesh Army XI by 2–0. However, they were defeated in the semifinals by Soongsil (a South Korean university team), which went on to win the tournament.

The side made several returns, most notably at the 2009 Nepal Prime Minister Cup Invitational Tournament, organised by the Republican Sports Federation of Nepal (RSFN). However, the team did not perform as well as in 2000, but finished instead at the bottom of their group after losing to Sri Lanka in their opener. However, Nepal Red managed to scoop the title by winning the finals on penalties.
