= Ratomir Dujković =

Serbian footballer and manager

Ratomir Dujković Ратомир Дујковић
Personal information
- Full name: Ratomir Dujković
- Date of birth: 24 February 1946 (age 80)
- Place of birth: Borovo, FPR Yugoslavia
- Position: Goalkeeper

Youth career
- Borovo
- –1962: Osijek
- 1962–1964: Red Star Belgrade

Senior career*
Years	Team	Apps	(Gls)
1964–1974	Red Star Belgrade	201	(0)
1974–1977	Real Oviedo	100	(0)
1977–1980	Osijek	84	(0)
1980–1983	Galenika Zemun	62	(0)

International career
1971	SFR Yugoslavia	4	(0)

Managerial career
- 1984–1985: Galenika Zemun
- 1987–1992: Red Star Belgrade (goalkeeping coach)
- 1992–1995: Venezuela
- 1996–1997: Myanmar
- 1997–1998: Atlético Zulia
- 1998–1999: Universidad de Los Andes
- 2001: Estudiantes de Mérida
- 2001–2004: Rwanda
- 2004–2006: Ghana
- 2006–2008: China U23
- 2009–2010: Serbia U21
- 2010: Syria
Medal record
Men's Football
Representing Yugoslavia
European Championship
Silver medal – second place	1968 Italy	Team
- * Club domestic league appearances and goals

Ratomir Dujković (Serbian Cyrillic: Ратомир Дујковић; born 24 February 1946) is a Serbian football manager and a former player.

== Playing career ==
Born and raised in Borovo Naselje to an ethnic Serb family, Dujković attended Ivan Goran Kovačić primary school, where he was initially active as a handball goalkeeper. He was spotted there by Josip Kezdi, at that point an ex-goalkeeper for NK Borovo, who suggested he try football. He took his advice and soon became a goalkeeper in NK Borovo, before earning a move to NK Osijek. On 29 November 1962, NK Osijek juniors took part in the Yugoslav Republic Day tournament in Belgrade where 16-year-old Dujković impressed so much that powerhouse Red Star Belgrade immediately offered a move to their youth system. He accepted right away and only went home to pick up personal belongings.

At Red Star he became part of a new batch of up-and-coming players along with Jovan Aćimović, Stanislav Karasi, Dragan Džajić, Trifke Mihajlović under coach Miljan Miljanić. Dujković made his first team debut on 4 June 1964 in a last week tie of the 1963/64 season versus OFK Beograd. While at Red Star he played in the 1971 European Champions Cup semi-final and earned four appearances in Yugoslavia national football team. In 1974, Dujković moved to Real Oviedo, spending three seasons with the Spanish outfit. He returned to Yugoslav First League in 1977, joining newly promoted NK Osijek and staying with the club for three seasons. Following the conclusion to 1979/80 campaign, at the end of which NK Osijek got relegated, Dujković made the switch to Galenika Zemun, another second league side, and helped it gain promotion in 1981/82 season. He would not play top flight football again, though, as he promptly retired in the summer of 1982.

== Managing career ==
Dujković's foray into coaching started with the same club he ended his playing days in: Galenika. He was part of their coaching staff during 1982/83 season, which the team finished dead last and got relegated again.

=== Galenika ===
Dujković's first head coaching job came in 1983 at Galenika Zemun. He led the team to some respectable results in Yugoslav Second League for a couple of seasons, but never gained promotion. In 1987, he accepted an offer from Red Star Belgrade to become the goalkeepers' coach on their staff. For the next 5 years Dujković worked under various head coaches, with the exception of one season that he spent assisting Gojko Zec in United Arab Emirates. Dujković was on the Red Star coaching staff when the team won the European Cup in 1991.

=== Venezuela ===
Dujković would wait until 1992 for his next head coaching job. He was recommended to the Venezuelan Football Federation by Vladica Popović and Dušan Marović both of whom had playing stints in the country. That, coupled with his knowledge of Spanish made Dujković the head coach of Venezuela national football team where he spent three years. Taking over the team of modest expectations, his biggest claims to success might be that under his guidance Venezuela avoided last place in Copa América for the first time in a very long period or that they jumped 29 places on the FIFA list.

=== Myanmar and a return to Venezuela ===
Next came the head coaching role at Myanmar's national football team. Dujković qualified them for Asian Games, but eventually quit due to Myanmar's turbulent relationship with FIFA. He returned to Venezuela to recently established Atlético Zulia club side from Maracaibo and got the coach of the year honours.

Afterwards, Dujković coached Universidad de Los Andes from Mérida and later their cross-town rivals Estudiantes. In 2000, he was included on the FR Yugoslavia's coaching staff for Euro 2000 under head coach Vujadin Boškov.

=== Rwanda ===
Dujković became the coach of the Rwandan football team in late 2001. Rwandan Football Federation sought assistance in their search for a coach from Serbia-Montenegro FA, which in turn recommended Dujković. Emerging from the horrors of genocide, football provided a welcome distraction for the people of Rwanda. The team won 7 of its first 18 matches under Dujković's guidance. He soon gained international acclaim when he led Rwanda into the African Cup of Nations for the first time. Ironically, Rwanda qualified at the expense of Ghana – a nation whose national team he would soon take over and lead to 2006 World Cup – in a memorable qualifier in Kigali on 6 July 2003.

At the final tournament in Tunisia in January 2004, Rwanda, among the smallest ever to qualify, came within minutes of progressing from the group and entering quarterfinals. Dujković's contract with Rwanda expired in mid-2004 and he left after failing to agree to a new contract with the Rwandan FA.

=== Ghana ===
In September 2004, the Portuguese-born Mariano Barreto quit the Ghana national football team to manage CS Marítimo in his native country. A long 3-month search for his replacement followed and it included various candidates (Philippe Troussier among many others). Finally by late November, the job was offered to Dujković who accepted it in mid-December. He thus took over the helm of the squad featuring a much greater depth of talent than Rwanda – not to mention the few established stars playing in top European clubs like Sammy Kuffour, Stephen Appiah and Michael Essien. Naturally, the expectations were also sizable and he was entrusted with the task of qualifying for the 2006 World Cup in Germany. He successfully achieved it, leading the side to their first ever FIFA World Cup appearance. The same qualifying tournament was also the qualification for the 2006 African Cup of Nations in Egypt.

Dujković faced a lot of opposition throughout his tenure in Ghana. Many wanted to see a domestic coach lead the national team. Calls for his sacking particularly intensified in January 2006 after an indifferent display at the 2006 African Cup of Nations where Ghana got drawn in a fairly difficult group with Nigeria, Senegal and Zimbabwe.

After losing to Nigeria and defeating Senegal, Ghana faced a deciding match against the seeming minnows of the group Zimbabwe who up to that point failed to collect a single point from first two matches. A win would assure progression for Ghana, but they lost 1-2 and failed to move to the second round. On 12 June 2006 at AWD-Arena in Hanover, Dujković led Ghana in its first ever World Cup match. Unfortunately, it ended unhappily for his team as Italy beat them easily 2-0.

The Black Stars went into their next match versus Czech Republic knowing a loss would probably mean elimination. In a very entertaining match, Ghana managed a famous 2-0 win despite missing several clear-cut scoring chances as well as failing to convert a penalty shot. Third game pitted Dujković's team against the United States and they delivered once more, beating the Americans 2-1 and qualifying for the Round of 16 where Brazil awaited.

Although powerhouse Brazil seemingly dispatched of them easily (3-0), Ghana put in a feisty display. The match contained some controversy too, as crucial second Brazilian goal right before halftime came from an offside that was not given. Dujković took his protest to the referee Ľuboš Micheľ and reportedly told him sarcastically that he should put on a Brazilian jersey. Micheľ responded by issuing a red card, meaning that Dujković was not on the sideline for the remainder of the game. Though his contract with Ghana had him committed until December 2006, Dujković resigned his post on 16 July 2006 citing health problems. Dujković was heavily criticised by the Ghanaian media, who believed that he had ulterior motives for resigning before the expiration of his contract. Dujković in turn, blamed the media for putting unmerited stress and pressure on him, a move that did not go down well with the Ghanaian public. Not long after he left the Ghanaian team, it was reported that he had signed up with China to coach the Chinese Olympic Soccer Team.

=== China Olympic team ===
On October 10, 2006, Dujković was appointed coach of China national under-23 football team also known as China's Olympic team. His main task was preparing the team for the 2008 Olympic Games on home soil for which the Chinese FA set the ambitious goal of reaching the semifinals. In late 2006, Dujković led the team in 2006 Asian Games where they progressed out of the group on top before losing a quarterfinal thriller to Iran u-23 on penalties.

In June 2007, following a string of bad results for China's senior national team led by Zhu Guanghu, Chinese media started calling for Dujković to take over the coaching duties of the top national side. For his part, Dujković expressed interest, but not before 2008 Olympics. He also ruled out coaching two sides at the same time. Still, he did get involved with the senior team in lesser capacity as the 'general coach' after his countryman Vladimir Petrović took over as head coach in September 2007.

After reiterating that Olympic medal is the goal in early July 2008, Dujković got sacked a week later (and only three weeks before the start of the Olympics) by the Chinese FA. The shocking development came as the culmination of the behind the scenes clashes between two parties. Dujković's assistant Yin Tiesheng took over on short notice and led the team in the Olympics. The team drew its first group match of the competition, and lost the remaining two, failing to progress out of the group.

=== Serbia under-21 team ===
On 15 July 2009, Dujković was named as the head coach of Serbia national under-21 football team. He took over the team that has had plenty of success in the years prior to his arrival and was now looking to continue down the same path. His immediate goal was qualifying for the 2011 European Under-21 Championship in Denmark.

His competitive debut took place on September 5, 2009 at home versus Slovakia, and it ended with Serbia losing 1-2 on a goal in injury time. Though two wins followed (away at Norway and home versus minnows Cyprus), many criticized the overall play of Dujković's team. After the away 3-1 loss to traditional rivals Croatia many criticized his player selection as well. As the long qualifying break commenced in November 2009, Dujković's team was in third spot with 9 points, behind Croatia (12) and Slovakia (10).

In early February 2010, Nigeria Football Association reportedly made preliminary contact with Dujković about taking over the head coaching duties at their national team. According to what Dujković told Serbian press, the potential deal included coaching Nigeria for four months conclusive with the 2010 World Cup. Furthermore, he publicly expressed interest in the job despite being under contract with Serbian FA (FSS), hoping to be allowed to perform two jobs simultaneously since Serbia u-21 did not resume playing competitive matches again until August 2010. FSS president Tomislav Karadžić said Dujković would be released from his contract without penalties should he request so, but ruled out allowing him to perform two jobs at the same time. The Nigerian job eventually went to Lars Lagerbäck.

On 11 August 2010, qualifying resumed for Serbia with a match away at Slovakia, the first of three must-wins if qualification was to be secured. Playing without Ivan Obradović and Raća Petrović who were made available to Radomir Antić's full squad that played a friendly match versus Greece the same day, and without Adem Ljajić and Danijel Aleksić, neither of whom Dujković called up, reasoning he needed players who "had more playing time in the recent period and had more experience". His team had a very poor outing, losing 1-2 and thus relinquishing any chance of qualifying for the 2011 European u-21 Championship.

One day after losing to Slovakia, Dujković handed in his resignation and did not lead the team in the remaining two matches of the qualifying. The job went to Tomislav Sivić who finished out the two meaningless qualifiers.

=== Syria ===
In mid-October 2010, Dujković was named the new head coach of the Syrian national team, thus becoming the fourth Serb, after Dragoslav Popović, Dragoslav Srijović and Miloslav Radivojević, to lead the Syrian football squad.

On 19 December 2010, two months after getting hired, Dujković was fired by the Syrian FA for "not returning from vacation on the agreed upon date". Dujković claimed to the Serbian press that he was not fired, but rather that he quit over Syrian FA's decision not to allow him to bring his own assistant coaches.

In April 2014 it was announced that Dujković was part of an 8-man shortlist to replace Eric Nshimiyimana as Rwanda manager.
