= Rudasingwa =

Rudasingwa is a Rwandan surname. Notable people with the surname include:

- Nelson Rudasingwa, Rwandan Biotechnologist and patriot - The Catholic University of America, Washington D.C
- Longin Rudasingwa, Rwandan professional football manager
- Theogene Rudasingwa (born 1960), Rwanda National Congress leading figure
- Jean-Marie Rudasingwa (1960–1994), Rwandan Olympic middle-distance runner
