= Lee Johnson (football coach) =

English football manager (born 1980)

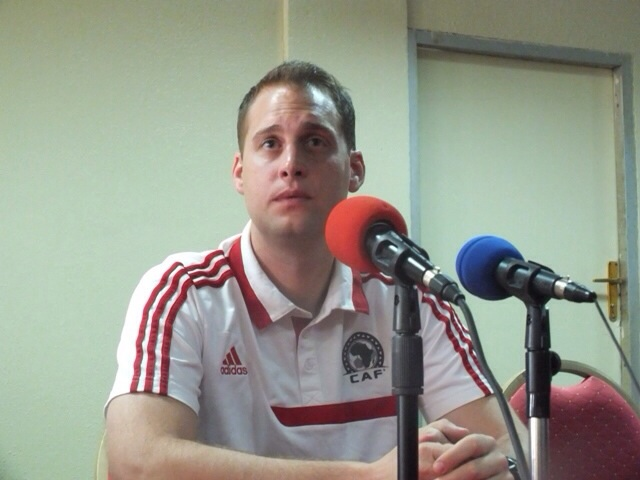
- Johnson as Rwanda manager in 2015

Personal information
- Full name: Lee Johnson
- Date of birth: 27 November 1980 (age 45)
- Place of birth: Dartford, England
- Position: Central defender

Youth career
- 1990–1996: Millwall F.C.

Senior career*
Years	Team	Apps	(Gls)
1997–1999	Ebbsfleet Utd		
1999–2001	Chatham Town		
2001–2003	Dartford		

Managerial career
- 2000–2005: Crystal Palace (Academy)
- 2006–2012: Chelsea (Academy)
- 2014–2015: Rwanda (Technical Director)
- 2014–2015: Rwanda U17
- 2015: Rwanda
- 2015–2017: India U19
- 2015–2017: India (Assistant)
- 2017–2020: Barnet (Head of Coaching)
- 2021–2023: Leyton Orient (Academy Manager)
- * Club domestic league appearances and goals

Lee Alan Johnson (born 27 November 1980) is an English football coach who was most recently Academy Manager for Leyton Orient. He was the head coach of India U19 and the assistant coach of India.

== Coaching career ==
=== Crystal Palace Football Club ===
In July 2000, Johnson joined Crystal Palace and spent five years working as a football development officer before sharing his role and working as a coach within the club's youth academy.

In 2003, while still working for Crystal Palace, he became an FA Learning Tutor for The Football Association and instructed courses for professional football clubs, county football associations, colleges and universities.

=== Chelsea Football Club ===
In July 2006, Johnson joined Chelsea and coached within the academy for six years, coaching players from 8 to 14 years old.

=== Fédération Rwandaise de Football Association ===
In July 2014, Johnson signed a two-year contract to become the National Technical Director of Rwanda, making him at the time one of the youngest technical directors in world football. He was responsible for development, management and implementation of the federation's national programmes which include grassroots, coach education, women's and girls' football and elite player development. Since his appointment the federation has introduced youth leagues across the country for both boys and girls. To help support this programme, Johnson worked to restructure the coach education programme and developed strong partnerships with The Football Association and the German Football Federation to introduce grassroots and leadership programmes to promote standards and increase the level of coaching across the country. In addition, Johnson coached the U17s and U23s National teams to compete in the AFCON qualifiers and international friendlies. In January 2015, he was appointed the interim National Team Coach following the resignation of the much admired Stephen Constantine who left to become the National Team Coach of India.

In July 2014, the national team were ranked 134th in the world. After a run of successful results Rwanda moved up to 64th in the FIFA world rankings, the highest position for the country as of 2015.

=== All India Football Federation ===
On 14 April 2015, it was announced that Johnson would be taking charge of the India U19 and would join Stephen Constantine's coaching staff as his assistant.

=== Barnet & Leyton Orient Football Clubs ===
In July 2017, Johnson was appointed Head of Coaching at Barnet, a role he remained in until the end of the 2019-20 season. He joined Leyton Orient in July 2021 as Academy Manager, leaving in February 2023.

== Coaching conventions ==
Johnson has worked as a consultant and has delivered coach education programmes, workshops and seminars for a number of professional organisations and associations, one of which was Inside Soccer. In August 2012, he was featured as a guest clinician at the Inside Soccer International Coaches Convention in New York. He also filmed a number of coaching sessions on youth development.

Since 2012, Johnson has been featured at a number of coaching conventions around the world. In 2014, he delivered a session at the NSCAA Convention "Philly 2014".
