= Tucak =

Tucak is a surname. Notable people with the surname include:

- Branko Tucak (born 1952), Croatian footballer
- Ivica Tucak (born 1970), Croatian water polo player
