= Raoul Shungu =

Congolese football manager (born 1958)

Personal information
- Full name: Raoul Jean-Pierre Shungu
- Date of birth: 3 January 1958 (age 68)
- Place of birth: Bukavu, Belgian Congo

Senior career*
Years	Team	Apps	(Gls)
- Kivu FC
- US Bilombe
- Bande Rouge FC

Managerial career
- Rayon Sport
- 2006–2008: Seychelles
- 2008: Rayon Sport
- 2008: Rwanda
- 2012: St. Eloi Lupopo
- * Club domestic league appearances and goals

Raoul Jean-Pierre Shungu (born 3 January 1958) is a Congolese professional football manager.

== Career ==
Born in Bukavu, Shungu played club football for local sides Kivu FC, US Bilombe and Bande Rouge FC.

Shungu was manager of the Seychelles national team between 2006 and 2008.

Shungu led Rwandan club side Rayon Sport to four league titles and one cup title, before he was appointed caretaker manager of the Rwandan national team in April 2008. He was replaced by Croatian Branko Tucak two weeks later.

Shungu managed Congolese side St. Eloi Lupopo during 2012.
