= Yoo Kee-heung =

South Korean footballer (born 1947)

- Hangul: 유기흥
- Hanja: 劉基興
- RR: Yu Giheung
- MR: Yu Kihŭng

Yoo Kee-heung (Korean: 유기흥; born 1947) is a Korean football manager and former player.

A full-back, Yoo represented South Korea as a player during the 1974 World Cup qualifiers.

Yoo subsequently turned to football coaching. He started in the schools with stints at the Geoje High School (1981–87) and with the Incheon University (1989–97) teams.

Yoo later went on to the national level, as Korea's national team assistant manager in 1993, during the 1994 World Cup qualifiers. However, the position went to Huh Jung-moo during the 1994 finals, though apparently he remained part of the coaching setup in some capacity.

After the 1994 World Cup, he was in charge of the South Korea women's national team (1999–2001), Bhutan national teams at various levels in 2002, the Nepal national team (2003), as well as various Nepalese youth teams. On 21 December 2007, it was announced that Yoo had been hired as the Cambodia national team coach. This appointment was reported to be part of a sponsorship deal with a Korean technology company worth $205 thousand a year, half of which will be Yoo's salary.

== Honours ==
=== Managerial ===
South Korean national B team

- Merlion Cup: 1992
