= 2009 ANFA Cup =

2009 Prime Minister's Invitational Tournament
2009 ANFA Cup

Tournament details
- Country: Nepal
- Dates: 5–14 March 2009
- Teams: 6

Final positions
- Champions: Nepal Red (Note: Nepal Red was effectively a full national team)
- Runners-up: Sri Lanka

Tournament statistics
- Matches played: 9
- Goals scored: 24 (2.67 per match)

2009 ANFA Cup, marketed as Prime Minister's Invitational Tournament, was the thirteenth version of the ANFA Cup, a knock-out football tournament organized by the All Nepal Football Association. All matches were played at the Dasarath Rangasala Stadium in Kathmandu. Six teams participated in the tournament.

== Teams ==
- Nepal Red
- Nepal Blue (Note: Nepal Blue was effectively a national B team)
- Sri Lanka
- Pakistan
- (Bangladesh) Arambagh KS
- (Thailand) JW GROUP

== Group stage ==
=== Group A ===
Pos	Team	Pld	W	D	L	GF	GA	GD	Pts	Qualification
1	Sri Lanka	2	1	1	0	3	2	+1	4	Knockout stage
2	(Thailand) JW GROUP	2	0	2	0	1	1	0	2	Knockout stage
3	Nepal Blue (H)	2	0	1	1	3	4	−1	1	

Source: RSSSF
(H) Hosts
5 March 2009

Nepal Blue	2–3	Sri Lanka
Santosh Sahukhala 7'; Santosh Nepali 73'	Report	E.B Channa 25'; Chathura Gunaratne 28'; Chatura Madhuranga 65'

7 March 2009

Nepal Blue	1–1	(Thailand) JW GROUP
Yougal Kishor Rai 41'	Report	Rachanath 83'

9 March 2009

Sri Lanka	0–0	(Thailand) JW GROUP

=== Group B ===
Pos	Team	Pld	W	D	L	GF	GA	GD	Pts	Qualification
1	Nepal Red (H)	2	1	1	0	2	1	+1	4	Knockout stage
2	(Bangladesh) Arambagh KS	2	0	2	0	2	2	0	2	Knockout stage
3	Pakistan	2	0	1	1	1	2	−1	1	

Source: RSSSF
(H) Hosts
6 March 2009

Nepal Red	1–1	(Bangladesh) Arambagh KS
Anajan KC 8'	Report	Khalid Saifulla 52'

8 March 2009

Arambagh KS (Bangladesh)	1–1	Pakistan
Moloy Barman 76'	Report	Essa (?)

11 March 2009

Nepal Red	1–0	Pakistan
Imran 67' (o.g.)	Report

== Bracket ==
Semi-finals
12 March
Sri Lanka	4
(Bangladesh) Arambagh KS	0
13 March
Nepal Red	2
(Thailand) JW GROUP	0

Final
14 March
Nepal Red (p)	0 (4)
Sri Lanka	0 (2)

== Matches ==
=== Semi-finals ===
12 March 2009

Sri Lanka	4–0	(Bangladesh) Arambagh KS

13 March 2009

Nepal Red	2–0	(Thailand) JW GROUP

=== Final ===
14 March 2009

Nepal Red	0–0	Sri Lanka
	Report
Penalties
Anil Gurung (penalty scored); Sandip Rai (penalty scored); Raju Tamang (penalty scored); Biraj Maharjan (penalty scored)	4–2	Maduranaga (penalty scored); Kasun (penalty scored); Sanjay (penalty missed); E.B. Chanua (penalty missed)

== See also ==
- ANFA Cup
