= Nepal national football team =

Men's association football team

Nepal
- Nickname: The Gorkhalis
- Association: All Nepal Football Association (ANFA)
- Confederation: AFC (Asia)
- Sub-confederation: SAFF (South Asia)
- Head coach: Vacant
- Captain: Kiran Chemjong
- Most caps: Kiran Chemjong (111)
- Top scorer: Ganesh Thapa (14)
- Home stadium: Dasharath Stadium
- FIFA code: NEP
First colours	Second colours

FIFA ranking
- Current: 178 ▼1 (7 October 2026)
- Highest: 124 (December 1993 – February 1994)
- Lowest: 196 (January 2016)

First international
- China 6–2 Nepal (Beijing, China; 13 October 1972)

Biggest win
- Nepal 7–0 Bhutan (Kathmandu, Nepal; 26 September 1999)

Biggest defeat
- South Korea 16–0 Nepal (Incheon, South Korea; 29 September 2003)

SAFF Championship
- Appearances: 13 (first in 1993)
- Best result: Runners-up (2021)

AFC Solidarity Cup
- Appearances: 1 (first in 2016)
- Best result: Champions (2016)

AFC Challenge Cup
- Appearances: 3 (first in 2006)
- Best result: Semi-finals (2006)
- Website: the-anfa.com

The Nepal national football team (Nepali: नेपाल राष्ट्रिय फुटबल टिम) represents Nepal in International men's football, and is governed by the All Nepal Football Association (ANFA). A member of the Asian Football Confederation (AFC), the Nepali football team plays their home games at Dasharath Stadium in Kathmandu.

== History ==
=== Emergence (1960s–2026) ===
In 1951, the All Nepal Football Association (ANFA) was founded, and this saw the formation of the Nepal national football team.

In 1963, Nepal appeared in their first international away game in the Aga Khan Gold Cup; the predecessor of the President's Gold Cup, Asia Champion Club Tournament, and Asian Club Championship (now rebranded as the AFC Champions League) after various associations (including ANFA) insisted on entering national teams instead of clubs. After Nepal entered an 18-man squad under head coach Padam Krishna Shrestha, ANFA flew the players to Dacca, East Pakistan (now Bangladesh) to play their first match. Nepal faced Pakistan Western Railway in the Bangabandhu National Stadium. However, Nepal lost the match 0–8. Two days later, Nepal played the Dhaka Wanderers, a local East Pakistani team. This match was also lost 0–7. After two disastrous games, Nepal was sure to be knocked out of the preliminary round. The final game was against Dhaka Police Club, though, despite the previous heavy losses, Nepal managed to win the game with a single goal, Prakash Bikram Shah becoming the first Nepali to score on foreign soil. The goal was scored in the 51st minute.

=== Modernization & golden generation (1970–1999) ===
In 1970, Nepal became a member of FIFA. Two years later, Nepal joined the Asian Football Confederation (AFC). In October 1972, under head coach Padam Krishna Shrestha, Nepal embarked on a month-long tour of China, playing the Chinese national team as well as several provincial and regional selections. Nepal played its first recognised international match on 13 October at the Workers' Stadium in Beijing, losing 6–2 to the People's Republic of China. The tour continued with defeats against Tianjin (5–2), Hebei (5–2), Sichuan (3–1), Hubei (6–2) and Hunan (4–2), before Nepal recorded consecutive victories in Guangzhou, defeating Guangdong Youth 3–2 on 4 November and Tibet 4–0 on 6 November. Nepal therefore completed the eight-match tour with two wins and six defeats.

The first Nepali footballer to score the first international goal for Nepal in a FIFA-recognized tournament was Y.B Ghale. Ghale scored against Kuwait in the 1982 Asian Games. Despite the popularity of the game, the lack of appropriate footballing infrastructure and the dearth of trainers, technicians, and other facilities have always been obstacles in the way of the Nepali FA's endeavors to raise the standard of football among the players of a nation that has an official per capita income of just 1,196 US dollars. The woes of Nepali football, however, have been immensely relieved by FIFA's determination to promote football in Nepal through youth programs.

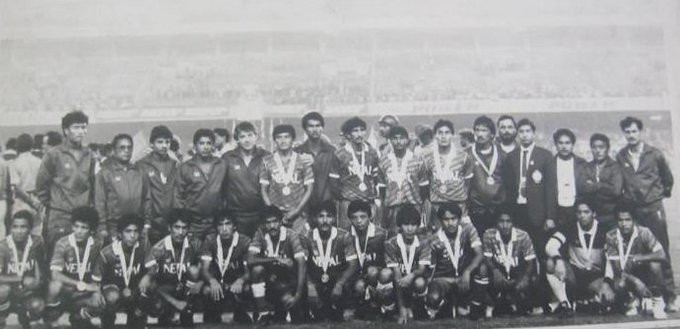
1984 South Asian Games gold medal winning Nepal national team

In the mid-1980s, FIFA provided financial assistance and sent a number of coaches to help Nepal's federation to launch its first youth program, which was geared towards spotting talent at the grassroots level (such as in schools, for example) and providing young players with the necessary know-how, both on and off the pitch. The initial five-year plan helped half the players groomed under the first youth program to find a place in the national side, and the team that won the 2 gold medals in the first and sixth South Asian Federation (SAF) Games mostly consisted of the players from that youth program. Despite Nepal being considered among the lower-ranked nations, Nepal has been largely successful in the South Asian Games where they won two gold, two silver, and two bronze medals.

Nepal hosted several notable friendlies from teams outside the Asian Confederation during the mid to late 80s, against Denmark in 1986; USSR and East Germany in 1987; and West Germany in 1989. While at the same time, Nepal still entered tournaments against club sides such as FC Ural Sverdlovsk Oblast in the 1989 ANFA Cup.

Nepal continued on with their winning ways through several minor tournaments which saw the nation showered with titles including the 1997 and 1998 Governor's Gold Cup, winning gold at the 1993 South Asian Games, and reaching 3rd place in the 1993 South Asian Association of Regional Co-operation Gold Cup (the first edition of the SAFF Championship).

=== Decline (2000–2009) ===
The Nepali football came across a forgettable two years from 2001 to 2003 when the row between two factions (government-backed and FIFA-backed) led Nepali football into deep trouble. Nepal faced a ban and therefore could not participate in any events and the rankings slipped heavily. The dispute was settled, but not before it contributed to pushing Nepali football backward. Nepal celebrated their 100th international football match in January 2003 when they played Bangladesh in the South Asian Football Federation (SAFF) Championship. Nepal failed to make any real impact at the tournament. During its 22 years of international participation, the Nepali team has only played 26 nations outside of South Asia, but it has defeated all of the country's South Asian neighbors during various regional tournaments. Nepal also faced non-AFC teams in competitive tournaments such as Ghana U23 in the 1999 Bangabandhu Cup, and Kazakhstan in the 2002 FIFA World Cup qualifying campaign (although Kazakhstan was a member of the AFC during this match).

In 2002, Nepal also faced a 7 match football series against Afghanistan and Afghanistan defeated Nepal 7-0 in that series.

Despite many attempts to raise the standard of football, the players of the resource-strapped nation have not been able to make their mark in international football beyond South Asia. In 2003 during the AFC Asian Cup qualifiers, Nepal's A national team suffered a number of heavy defeats in international matches outside of South Asia. In a match during the Asian Cup qualifying round in South Korea, the hosts scored 16 goals to no reply. In their six matches, Nepal conceded 45 goals and failed to hit the back of the net even once. However, the qualifying competition for the 2002 FIFA World Cup witnessed one of Nepal's best performances in international football, with the Gorkhalis securing two wins in four matches and scoring 13 goals in two matches against Macao and Iraq. But with the Nepali national and youth teams failing to achieve any noticeable success at the international level and FIFA introducing new age restriction systems in several international tournaments, Nepal recently decided to compete only in the FIFA World Cup and AFC Asian Cup qualifiers as well as the SAFF Championship until 2006.

=== Resurgence (2010–present) ===
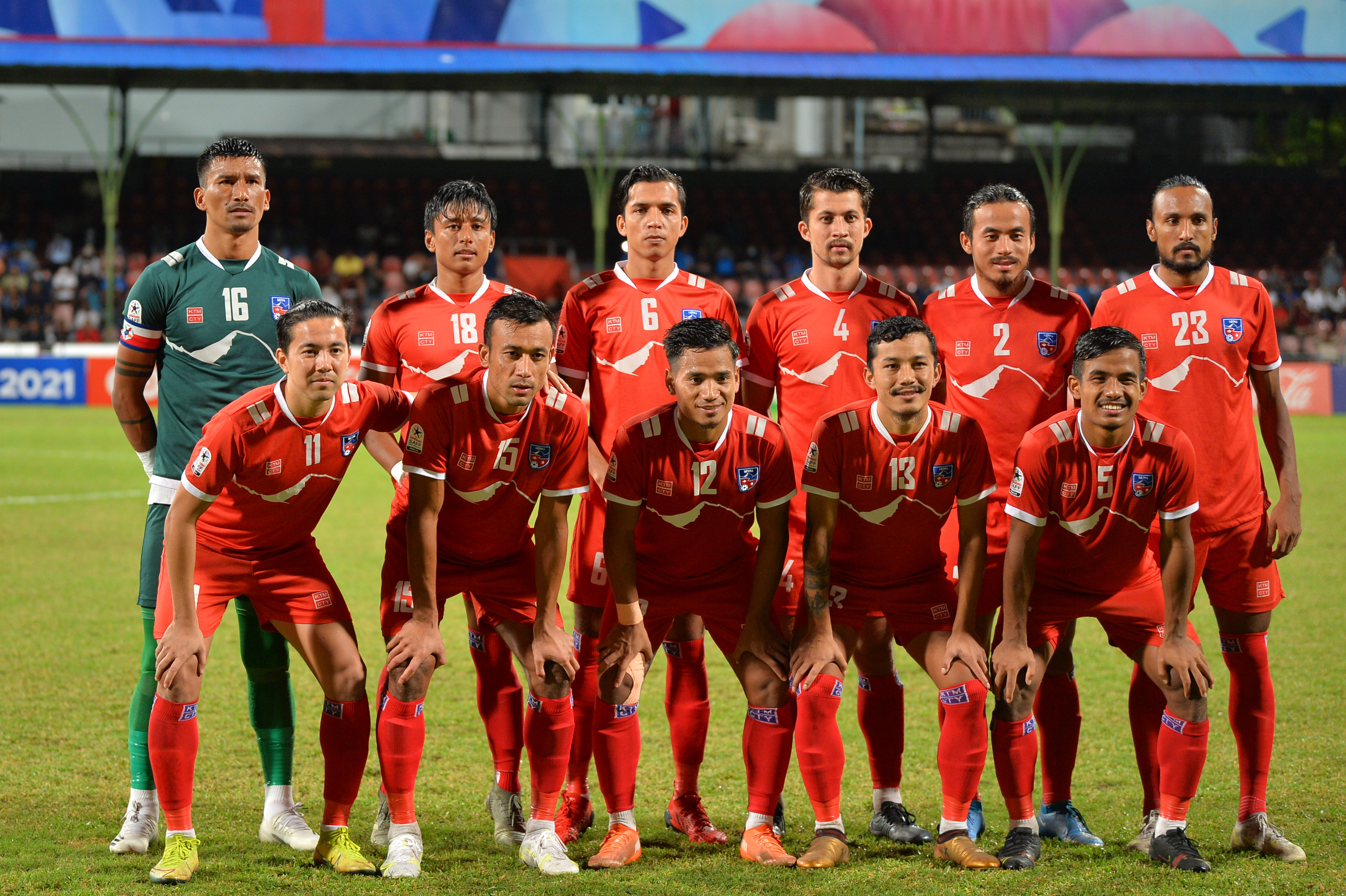
Nepal playing XI against India at the 2021 SAFF Championship final

After the marquee appointments of Graham Roberts, Nepal had experienced a fair amount of success following the decade of decline. Nepal won Saff U-19 championship in 2015 and 3 major tournaments in 2016, the Bangabandhu Cup and the AFC Solidarity Cup and won a gold medal in 2016 South Asian Games. Nepal lost no match in 2016.

Nepal managed a good performance in the 2019 AFC Asian Cup qualification, even though the team was chosen as a replacement for the Guam national football team as Guam chose not to participate. Nepal had two successful draws against much stronger Philippines and Yemen at home, both ended 0–0. However, as the team lost to Tajikistan twice and away loss to the Philippines and Yemen, the Nepalis failed to qualify to the 2019 AFC Asian Cup.

Nepal participated in the second round of the 2022 FIFA World Cup qualification where they have to face Australia, Kuwait, Jordan and Chinese Taipei. The Nepalis only managed one single win over Chinese Taipei away 2–0 and lost to the other opponents without scoring a goal after five matches.

Nepal participated in the 2021 SAFF Championship and managed to reach the tournament final where they were defeated 0–3 by India.

In October 2023, Nepal participated in the first round of the 2026 FIFA World Cup qualification against Laos. The first leg contested in a goalless draw between both team where else on 17 October 2023, Manish Dangi scored the only goal in the match to secure the victory for Nepal seeing them advanced to the second round.

In March 2024, Nepal lost to Bahrain 0–3 in a 2026 FIFA World Cup qualification match which eliminated the team from advancing to the next round.

== Team image ==
=== Home stadium ===
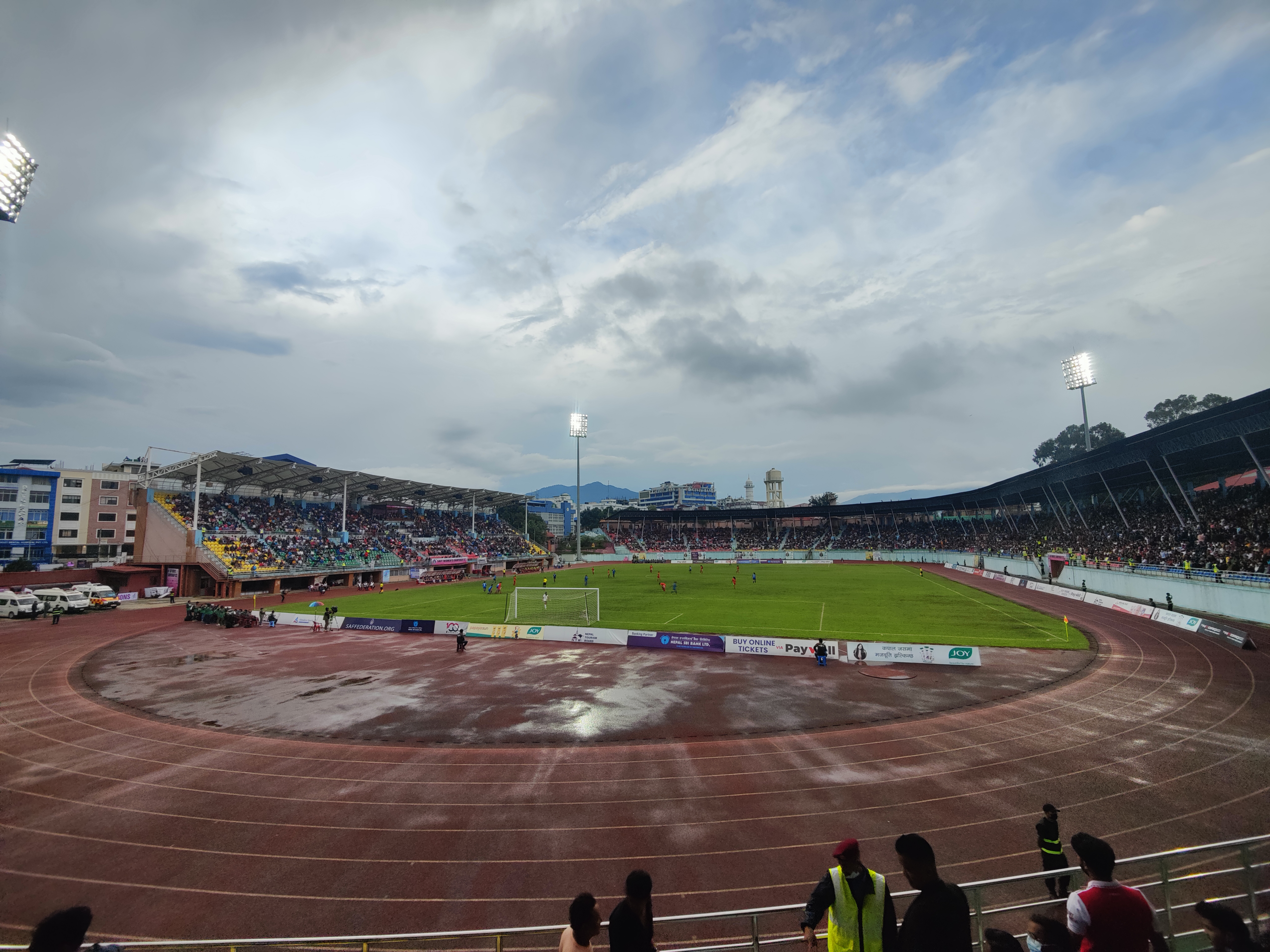
Dasarath Rangasala Stadium

The team's home ground is various around the nation one of the ground being Dasarath Rangasala Stadium, a multi-purpose stadium in Kathmandu, Nepal. Holding 15,000 spectators all of which are beautifully seated. It is the biggest stadium in Nepal. It is named after Dashrath Chand, one of the martyrs of Nepal.

Most recently, the stadium was used as a primary venue for the 2012 AFC Challenge Cup and the 2013 SAFF Championship, with the Halchowk Stadium hosting some of the matches as well.

Apart from sporting events, the stadium is also used as a music venue for cultural events with Bryan Adams being the most notable act that performed at the site.

Before the 2013 SAFF Championship in Nepal, the stadium underwent a heavy renovation that saw several improvements such as the expansion of seats from 20,000 to 28,000.

The country also has some recently added stadiums that include Pokhara football stadium located at Pokhara Rangasala which constructed in 2021.

=== Kit evolution ===
The national team's kit employs a tricolor of red, blue, and white to reflect the colors of the national flag of Nepal. With red being used for home matches, and blue for away. The pattern in some kits reflects the triangular shaping of the flag, namely the 2013 kit. Nepal's kits are mostly template kits, as opposed to a custom team-specific kit. This is because the Nepal national team isn't lucrative enough to afford kit partnership deals with manufacturers.

Very little is known about the history prior to 1998. However, during the 1998 Asian Games in Bangkok, the Nepali national team hired Bijay Shah to provide technical assistance to the squad, while also acting as the assistant coach. At the time, the team didn't have printed sportswear for the tournament. After printing makeshift kits, Bijay was inspired to start a T-shirt printing company, where through the partnership with a US printing company, and colleagues in South Korea, they produced their first batch of kits for the national team prior to the 1999 South Asian Games.

On 4 March 2019, ANFA has revealed two new jerseys for members of the national football team along with new national football anthem. The new jerseys have ANFA logo on the left where used to be national flag in the old jerseys. There is also national flag and picture of Mount Everest above the ANFA logo. This new sign is designed by Sandeep Tiwari. ANFA also made provision of white jerseys for friendly matches.

In 2021, ANFA ended the contract with Kelme, the previous kit sponsor, and signed with KTM CTY.

==== Kit suppliers ====
Kit provider	Period
(Thailand) Grand Sport	1987–1993
(England) Admiral	1993–1997
(Thailand) FBT	1997–1998
(Argentina) Topper	1998–2000
(Germany) Adidas	2000–2001
(Nepal) In-House	2001–2004
(China) Mesuca	2004–2005
(Germany) Adidas	2005–2018
(Spain) Kelme	2018–2021
(Nepal) KTM CTY	2021–2024
(Spain) Kelme	2024–present

=== Nepal Red & Blue ===
During the ANFA Cup, the All Nepal Football Association occasionally entered two teams for Nepal; Nepal Red & Nepal Blue. This is very much akin to other South Asian teams such as Pakistan B and Bangladesh B. Nepal Red was a selection of Nepali players that played as the full Nepal national football team. Whereas, Nepal Blue was effectively the B-team.

Most of the Nepali top players play in the Nepal Red team, and it is also described as "the Nepal senior team", and is captained by the regular national team captain. While Nepal Blue is described as the "second string team".

== Results and fixtures ==
The following is a list of match results in the last 12 months, as well as any future matches that have been scheduled. Win Draw Loss Fixture

=== 2025 ===
14 October 2027 ACQ R3	Nepal	0–1	Vietnam	Ho Chi Minh City, Vietnam (Note: Stadiums in Nepal do not meet AFC requirements, thus Nepal are required to play their home matches at a neutral venue.)
20:00 UTC+7 (Note: Match time was previously 19:30, but due to rain in Ho Chi Minh City, it was delayed for 30 minutes)		Report (AFC)	Suman 5' (o.g.)	Stadium: Thống Nhất Stadium; Attendance: 6,870; Referee: Mohamed Khaled (Bahrain)

13 November Friendly	Bangladesh	2–2	Nepal	Dhaka, Bangladesh
20:00 UTC+6	Hamza 46', 50' (pen.)	Report	R. Chand 29'; A. Tamang 90+3'	Stadium: National Stadium; Referee: Kasun Lakmal Weerakkody (Sri Lanka)

18 November 2027 ACQ R3	Nepal	0–1	Malaysia	Kuala Lumpur, Malaysia
21:00 UTC+8		Report (AFC)	Faisal 56'	Stadium: Bukit Jalil National Stadium; Attendance: 14,243; Referee: Kim Dae-yong (South Korea)

=== 2026 ===
31 March 2027 ACQ R3	Nepal	0–1	Laos	Vientiane, Laos
19:00 UTC+7		Report; Report (AFC)	Bounphachan 48'	Stadium: New Laos National Stadium; Attendance: 2,327; Referee: Ahmad A'Qashah (Singapore)

== Coaching staff ==
As of 20 March 2025

Position	Name
Team manager	(Nepal) Nakul Hamal Thakuri
Team manager	(Nepal) Ramesh Kumar Karki
Head coach	Vacant
Assistant coach	(Nepal) Salyan Khadgi
Technical Analyst	Vacant
Goalkeeping coach	(Nepal) Binod Maharjan
Physiotherapist	(Nepal) Avishkar Pudasaini
Team Doctor	(Nepal) Raju Dangol Maharjan
Team Official	(Nepal) Bijay Kumar Gupta
Media Manager	(Nepal) Krishna Singh Lothyal

=== Coaching History ===
List of Head Coaches
Name	Period	P	W	D	L	Win %	Achievements	Comment	Ref.
(Nepal) Padam Krishna Shrestha	1972								
(China) Zeng Shi Chui	1981–82	—	−	−	−	—	1982 Asian Games		
(China) Wang Lu	1983	—	−	−	−	—			
(West Germany) Jochen Figge	1984–85	—	−	−	−	—	1984 South Asian Games: Gold medalist		
(West Germany) Rudi Gutendorf	1986	—	−	−	−	—			
(Republic of Ireland) Joe Kinnear	1987	—	−	−	−	—	1987 South Asian Games: Silver medalist		
(West Germany) Reinhard Fabisch	1989	—	−	−	−	—			
(Nepal) Dhan Bahadur Basnet	1989–91	—	−	−	−	—			
(Nepal) Maheshwor Mulmi (Germany) Holger Obermann	1991–93	—	−	−	−	—	1991 South Asian Games; 1993 SAARC Gold Cup: Third place	Although both Obermann and Mulmi were heavily involved in the national team during these years, Obermann was hired by the All Nepal Football Association as a 'Technical Director'	
(Nepal) Dhan Bahadur Basnet	1993–94	—	−	−	−	—	1993 South Asian Games: Gold medalist 1994 Asian Games		
(Nepal) Maheshwor Mulmi	1995	—	−	−	−	—	1995 Bristol SAFF Gold Cup		
(Nepal) Yogambar Suwal	1995	—	−	−	−	—	1995 South Asian Games		
(Nepal) Bhim Thapa	1996	—	−	−	−	—	1996 AFC Asian Cup: Failed to qualify		
(Nepal) Yogambar Suwal	1997	—	−	−	−	—	1998 FIFA World Cup: Failed to qualify		
(Nepal) Dhan Bahadur Basnet	1997	—	−	−	−	—	1997 SAFF Gold Cup		
(South Korea) Yoo Kee-heung	1998	—	−	−	−	—	1998 Asian Games		
(Germany) Torsten Spittler	1999	—	−	−	−	—	1999 SAFF Gold Cup: Fourth place		
(England) Stephen Constantine	1999–01	—	−	−	−	—	1999 South Asian Games: Silver medalist 2000 ANFA Coca Cola Invitational Tournament: Finalist		
(Nepal) Maheshwor Mulmi	2001	—	−	−	−	—	2002 FIFA World Cup: Failed to qualify		
(South Korea) Yoo Kee-heung	2003	—	−	−	−	—	2003 SAFF Gold Cup: Group stage		
(Japan) Toshihiko Shiozawa	2005–06	—	−	−	−	—	2005 SAFF Gold Cup: Group stage		
(India) Shyam Thapa	2006–07	—	−	−	−	—	2006 AFC Challenge Cup: Semi-final; 2010 FIFA World Cup: Failed to qualify		
(Germany) Thomas Flath	2008	—	−	−	−	—	2008 SAFF Championship: Group stage		
(Nepal) Birat Krishna Shrestha	2008	—	−	−	−	—	2008 AFC Challenge Cup: Group stage		
(Nepal) Krishna Thapa	2008–09	—	−	−	−	—	2008 Merdeka Tournament: Group stage		
(Nepal) Yogamber Suwal	2009	—	−	−	−	—	2009 Prime Minister's Invitational Tournament: Champions; 2010 AFC Challenge Cup: Failed to qualify		
(Nepal) Krishna Thapa	2009–11	—	−	−	−	—	2009 SAFF Championship: Group stage		
(England) Graham Roberts	2011–12	—	−	−	−	—	2011 SAFF Championship: Semi-final; 2014 FIFA World Cup: Failed to qualify 2012 AFC Challenge Cup: Group stage	Reached Round 2 in the World Cup qualifiers for the first time	
(Nepal) Krishna Thapa	2012	—	−	−	−	—	2012 Nehru Cup		
(United States) Jack Stefanowski	2013	—	−	−	−	—	2013 SAFF Championship: Semi-final; 2014 AFC Challenge Cup: Failed to qualify		
(Nepal) Raju Kaji Shakya	2014	—	−	−	−	—			
(United States) Jack Stefanowski	2014–15	—	−	−	−	—	2018 FIFA World Cup: Failed to qualify		
(Nepal) Dhruba KC	2015	—	−	−	−	—			
(Belgium) Patrick Aussems	2015–16	3	0	0	3	0	2015 SAFF Championship: Group stage		
(Nepal) Bal Gopal Maharjan	2016	5	3	2	0	60	2016 Bangabandhu Cup: Champions	Earned Nepal's first major title in 23 years	
(Japan) Koji Gyotoku	2016–18	13	4	5	4	31	2016 AFC Solidarity Cup: Champions	Earned Nepal's first AFC title	
(Nepal) Bal Gopal Maharjan	2018	6	2	0	4	33	2018 SAFF Championship: Semi-final; 2018 Bangabandhu Cup: Group stage	Interim Coach	
(Sweden) Johan Kalin	2019–20	6	1	2	3	17			
(Nepal) Bal Gopal Maharjan	2020–21	5	1	3	1	20			
(Kuwait) Abdullah Al Mutairi	2021–22	18	5	2	11	28	2021 SAFF Championship runner up		
(United States) Pradip Humagain	2022	1	1	0	0	100			
	2022	1	1	0	0	100			
(Italy) Vincenzo Alberto Annese	2023–24	10	3	3	4	33	2023 SAFF Championship: Group stage		
(Australia) Matt Ross	2025	3	1	1	1	33.33			
(Nepal) Hari Khadka	2025–2026	0	0	1	3	0			
(Italy) (Switzerland) Guglielmo Arena	2026–	0	0	0	0	0			

== Players ==
=== Current squad ===
The following 23 players were called up to the final squad for matches against Laos.

Caps and goals are correct as of 25 March 2025 after the game against Malaysia.

No.	Pos.	Player	Date of birth (age)	Caps	Goals	Club
1	GK	Bishal Sunar	9 February 2002 (age 24)	1	0	(All Nepal Football Association) Friends
16	GK	Kiran Chemjong (captain)	20 March 1990 (age 36)	107	0	(Bangladesh Football Federation) Bangladesh Police
22	GK	Deep Karki	9 January 1998 (age 28)	5	0	(All Nepal Football Association) Sankata
2	DF	Sanish Shrestha	9 November 2000 (age 26)	22	0	(Bangladesh Football Federation) Brothers Union
3	DF	Suman Shrestha	5 September 1999 (age 27)	3	0	(Football Association of Maldives) ODI Sports
4	DF	Ananta Tamang	17 January 1998 (age 28)	67	4	(Bangladesh Football Federation) Fortis FC
5	DF	Bimal Panday	21 January 1990 (age 36)	7	0	(All Nepal Football Association) Nepal Army
12	DF	Sumit Shrestha	30 January 2004 (age 22)	5	0	(All Nepal Football Association) New Road Team
13	DF	Abhishek Limbu	21 August 1999 (age 27)	3	0	(Bangladesh Football Federation) Rahmatganj MFS
23	DF	Rohit Chand	1 March 1992 (age 34)	97	1	(Football Association of Indonesia) Persik Kediri
6	MF	Samyog Gurung	27 January 2007 (age 19)	1	1	(Bangladesh Football Federation) Brothers Union
8	MF	Arik Bista	17 March 2000 (age 26)	29	0	(Bangladesh Football Federation) Brothers Union
9	MF	Rohan Karki	21 September 2002 (age 24)	4	0	(All Nepal Football Association) Church Boys United
10	MF	Laken Limbu	24 July 2002 (age 24)	16	0	(Football Federation of Cambodia) Kirivong Sok Sen Chey
15	MF	Kritish Ratna Chhunju	11 April 2003 (age 23)	0	0	(All Nepal Football Association) New Road Team
17	MF	Kushal Deuba	10 November 2006 (age 20)	0	0	(All Nepal Football Association) Lalitpur City
19	MF	Ayush Ghalan	21 February 2004 (age 22)	31	2	(Bangladesh Football Federation) Bangladesh Police
20	MF	Mani Kumar Lama	24 March 1996 (age 30)	9	0	(All Nepal Football Association) APF FC
21	MF	Manish Dangi	17 September 2001 (age 25)	38	4	(All Nepal Football Association) Machhindra
7	FW	Gillespye Jung Karki	19 November 1998 (age 27)	15	3	(Football Association of Malaysia) PDRM
11	FW	Subash Bam Thakuri	5 September 2008 (age 18)	1	0	(Philippine Football Federation) Siniloan Lions
14	FW	Anjan Bista	15 May 1998 (age 28)	70	13	(Bangladesh Football Federation) Brothers Union
27	FW	Srijan Raj Gautam	17 July 2002 (age 24)	1	0	(All Nepal Football Association) Chitwan

=== Recent call-ups ===
The following players have been called up to a Nepal squad in the last 12 months.

Pos.	Player	Date of birth (age)	Caps	Goals	Club	Latest call-up^{PRE}
Notes: ^{INJ} = Withdrew due to injury.; ^{PRE} = Preliminary squad / standby.; ^{RET} = Retired from the national team.; ^{SUS} = Serving suspension.; ^{WD} = Player withdrew from the squad due to non-injury issue.

== Player records ==
As of 18 November 2025
Players in bold are still active with Nepal.

=== Most appearances ===
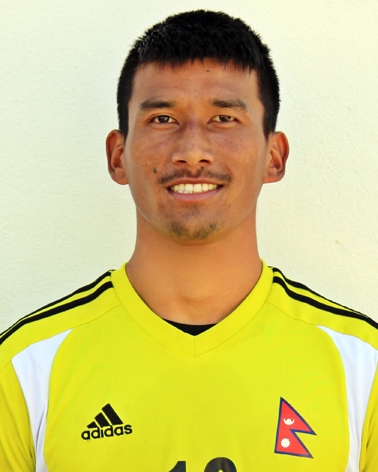
Kiran Chemjong is Nepal's highest capped player with 107 appearances.

Rank	Player	Caps	Goals	Career
1	**Kiran Chemjong**	113	0	2008–present
2	**Rohit Chand**	103	2	2009–present
3	Raju Kaji Shakya	91	0	1982–1997
4	Biraj Maharjan	78	1	2008–2021
5	**Anjan Bista**	75	13	2014–present
6	**Ananta Tamang**	73	5	2015–present
7	Sagar Thapa	66	1	2003–2015
8	**Bharat Khawas**	64	10	2008–present
9	Sandip Rai	55	4	2008–2015
10	Anil Gurung	54	10	2007–2017
10	Ju Manu Rai	54	11	2006–2015
10	Nawayug Shrestha	54	10	2015–2023

=== Top goalscorers ===
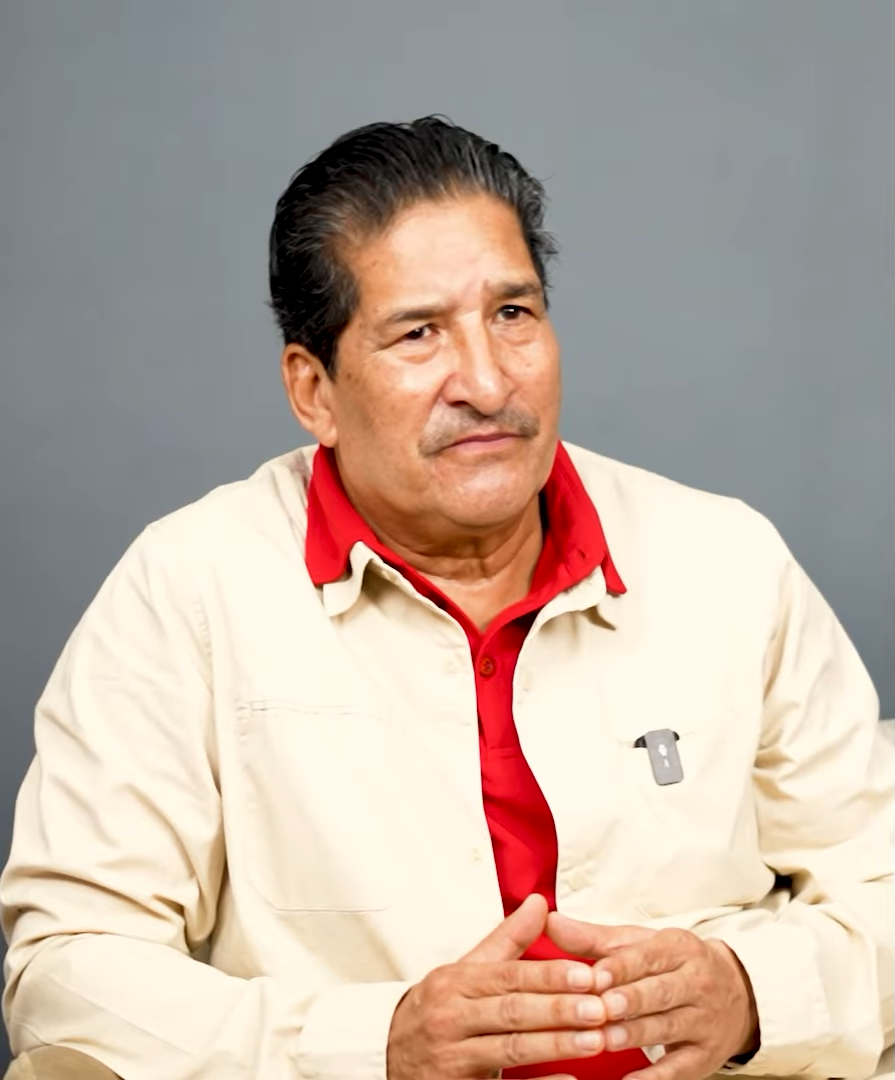
Ganesh Thapa is Nepal's highest goalscorer with 14 goals.

Rank	Player	Goals	Caps	Ratio	Career
1	Ganesh Thapa	14	40	0.35	1981–1989
2	Nirajan Rayamajhi	13	22	0.59	2000–2008
2	Hari Khadka	13	40	0.33	1995–2006
2	**Anjan Bista**	13	75	0.17	2014–present
5	Ju Manu Rai	11	54	0.2	2006–2015
6	Anil Gurung	10	54	0.19	2007–2017
6	Nawayug Shrestha	10	54	0.19	2015–2023
6	**Bharat Khawas**	10	64	0.16	2008–present
9	Bimal Gharti Magar	9	44	0.2	2012–2023
10	Basanta Thapa	8	35	0.23	1998–2006

== Competitive record ==
Champion Runners-up Third place Fourth place

=== FIFA World Cup ===
FIFA World Cup record										Qualification record								
Year	Position	Pld	W	D	L	GF	GA	GD	Pts	Position	Pld	W	D	L	GF	GA	GD	Pts
1930 to 1970	Not a FIFA member									Not a FIFA member								
1974 to 1982	Did not enter									Did not enter								
(Mexico); 1986	Did not qualify									3rd	4	0	1	3	0	11	−11	1
(Italy); 1990	Did not qualify									4th	6	0	0	6	0	28	−28	0
(United States); 1994	Did not enter									Did not enter								
(France); 1998	Did not qualify									4th	6	0	1	5	2	19	−17	1
(South Korea) (Japan); 2002	Did not qualify									3rd	6	2	0	4	13	25	−12	6
(Germany); 2006	Withdrew									Withdrew								
(South Africa) 2010	Did not qualify									Round 1	2	0	0	2	0	4	−4	0
(Brazil); 2014	Did not qualify									Round 2	4	2	1	1	8	11	−3	7
(Russia); 2018	Did not qualify									Round 1	2	0	1	1	0	2	−2	1
(Qatar); 2022	Did not qualify									Round 2	8	2	0	6	4	22	−18	6
(Canada) (Mexico) (United States); 2026	Did not qualify									Round 2	8	1	2	5	4	21	–17	5
(Morocco) (Portugal) (Spain); 2030	To be determined									To be determined								
(Saudi Arabia); 2034	To be determined									To be determined								
Total	0/14	–	–	–	–	–	–	–	–	8/22	46	7	6	33	31	143	−112	27

=== Olympic Games ===
Year	Position	Q	Pld	W	D*	L	GF	GA	GD	Pts
(Greece) 1896	No football tournament held									
(France) 1900 – (Netherlands) 1928	Not an IOC Member									
(United States) 1932	No football tournament held									
(Nazi Germany) 1936 – (Italy) 1960	Not an IOC Member									
(Japan) 1964 – (South Korea) 1988	Did not enter									
(Spain) 1992 – present	See Nepal under-23 football team ^{1} (Age bar restriction after 1996, U23s only)									
Total	—	0/28	0	0	0	0	0	0	0	0

=== AFC Asian Cup ===
AFC Asian Cup record										Qualification record								
Year	Position	Pld	W	D	L	GF	GA	GD	Pts	Result	Pld	W	D	L	GF	GA	GD	Pts
(Hong Kong) 1956	Not an AFC member										Not an AFC member							
(South Korea) 1960	Not an AFC member										Not an AFC member							
(Israel) 1964	Not an AFC member										Not an AFC member							
(Iran) 1968	Not an AFC member										Not an AFC member							
(Thailand) 1972	Withdrew										Withdrew							
(Iran) 1976	Withdrew										Withdrew							
(Kuwait) 1980	Withdrew										Withdrew							
(Singapore) 1984	Did not qualify									5th (Group 2)	4	0	0	4	0	30	−30	0
(Qatar) 1988	Did not qualify									5th (Group 3)	4	0	1	3	0	7	−7	1
(Japan) 1992	Withdrew										Withdrew							
(United Arab Emirates) 1996	Did not qualify									4th (Group 5)	6	0	0	6	2	26	−24	0
(Lebanon) 2000	Did not qualify									4th (Group 5)	4	1	0	3	3	13	−10	3
(China) 2004	Did not qualify									4th (Group E)	8	1	0	7	4	45	-41	3
(Indonesia) (Malaysia) (Thailand) (Vietnam) 2007	Withdrew										Withdrew							
(Qatar) 2011	Did not qualify									Withdrew and berth unsecured (Note: Withdrew from qualification and failed to qualify for 2010 AFC Challenge Cup)								
(Australia) 2015	Did not qualify									2014 AFC Challenge Cup								
(United Arab Emirates) 2019	Did not qualify									Round 1 (Note: Also part of the 2018 FIFA World Cup qualification)	2	0	1	1	0	2	−2	1
(Qatar) 2023	Did not qualify									Round 3	11	2	0	9	5	35	−30	6
(Saudi Arabia) 2027	Did not qualify																	
Total	0	0	0	0	0	0	0	0	0	0/0	39	4	2	33	14	158	−144	14

=== AFC Challenge Cup ===
AFC Challenge Cup record											Qualification record								
Year	Position	Pts	Pld	W	D*	L	GF	GA	GD	Pts	Position	Pld	W	D	L	GF	GA	GD	Pts
(Bangladesh) 2006	Semi-finals	7	3	1	1	1	4	3	+1	7	No qualification tournament								
(India) 2008	Round 1	3	1	0	2	3	4	1	+3	3	1st (Group D)	2	2	0	0	4	2	+2	6
(Sri Lanka) 2010	Did not qualify										2nd (Group C)	2	0	2	0	1	1	+0	2
(Nepal) 2012	Round 1	0	3	0	0	3	0	6	−6	0	2nd (Group D)	3	1	1	1	1	1	+0	4
(Maldives) 2014	Did not qualify										3rd (Group D)	3	1	1	1	6	2	+4	4
Total	3/5	10	7	1	3	7	8	10	−2	10	4/4	10	4	4	2	12	6	+6	16

=== AFC Solidarity Cup ===
Year	Position	Pld	W	D*	L	GF	GA	GD	Pts
(Malaysia) 2016	Champions	4	3	1	0	6	2	+4	10
2020	Cancelled								
Total	1/1	4	3	1	0	6	2	+4	10

=== SAFF Championship ===
Year	Position	Pld	W	D*	L	GF	GA	GD	Pts
(Pakistan) 1993	Third place	3	0	2	1	1	2	−1	2
(Sri Lanka) 1995	Fourth place	3	1	0	2	2	2	0	3
(Nepal) 1997	Round 1	2	0	0	2	1	5	−4	0
(India) 1999	Fourth place	4	1	0	3	6	9	−3	3
(Bangladesh) 2003	Round 1	3	1	0	2	4	5	−1	3
(Pakistan) 2005	Round 1	3	1	0	2	4	5	−1	3
(Maldives) (Sri Lanka) 2008	Round 1	3	1	0	2	5	9	−4	3
(Bangladesh) 2009	Round 1	3	1	1	1	4	2	+2	4
(India) 2011	Semi-finals	4	1	2	1	3	3	0	5
(Nepal) 2013	Semi-finals	4	2	1	1	5	3	+2	7
(India) 2015	Round 1	2	0	0	2	1	5	−4	0
(Bangladesh) 2018	Semi-finals	4	2	0	2	7	5	+2	6
(Maldives) 2021	Runners-up	5	2	1	2	5	7	–2	7
(India) 2023	Group stage	3	1	0	2	2	5	–3	3
(Bangladesh) 2026	Suspended by FIFA								
Total	12/12	46	14	7	25	50	67	–17	49

=== Asian Games ===
Year	Position	Pld	W	D*	L	GF	GA	GD	Pts
(India) 1951	Not an IOC Member								
(Philippines) 1954	Not an IOC Member								
(Japan) 1958	Not an IOC Member								
(Indonesia) 1962	Not an IOC Member								
(Thailand) 1966	Withdrew								
(Thailand) 1970	Withdrew								
(Iran) 1974	Withdrew								
(Thailand) 1978	Withdrew								
(India) 1982	Round 1	3	0	0	3	1	9	−8	0
(South Korea) 1986	Round 1	4	0	0	4	0	17	−17	0
(China) 1990	Withdrew								
(Japan) 1994	Round 1	3	0	0	3	0	20	−20	0
(Thailand) 1998	Round 1	2	0	0	2	0	6	−6	0
Since 2002	See Nepal under-23 team								
Total	4/13	12	0	0	12	1	52	−51	0

=== South Asian Games ===
Year	Position	Pld	W	D*	L	GF	GA	GD	Pts
(Nepal) 1984	Gold	4	3	0	1	13	7	+6	6 (Note: prior to the Three points for a win rule)
(Bangladesh) 1985	Bronze	3	2	0	1	3	4	–1	4
(India) 1987	Silver	3	2	0	1	7	3	+4	4
(Pakistan) 1989	4th	3	0	2	1	1	2	–1	2
(Sri Lanka) 1991	4th	3	0	1	2	2	5	–3	1
(Bangladesh) 1993	Gold	3	1	1	1	3	2	+1	7
(India) 1995	4th	3	1	0	2	2	2	0	3
(Nepal) 1999	Silver	5	3	0	2	12	7	+5	9
Since 2001	See Nepal under-23 team								
Total	2 titles	27	12	4	11	43	32	+11	36

=== Other tournaments ===
In these tournaments, Nepal was sometimes fielded as 'ANFA XI', 'Nepal XI', or 'Nepal Sports Development Authority' despite being the de facto national football team endorsed by the ANFA.

Year	Result	Pld	W	D*	L	GF	GA	GD	Pts	Team Name (Note: unless otherwise noted, the team played as the Nepal National Football Team)
(India) 1975 DCM Cup	Unknown	-	-	-	-	-	-	-	-	
(Bangladesh) 1979 President's Gold Cup	Unknown	-	-	-	-	-	-	-	-	
(Bangladesh) 1979 Agatha Gold Cup	Unknown	-	-	-	-	-	-	-	-	
(Bangladesh) 1979 Aga Khan Gold Cup	Round 1	4	0	1	3	2	14	1		
(Bangladesh) 1981 President's Gold Cup	Unknown	-	-	-	-	-	-	-	-	
(India) 1982 Darjeeling Gold Cup	Unknown	-	-	-	-	-	-	-	-	
(Pakistan) 1982 Quaid-e-Azam Tournament	6th	6	1	2	3	3	9	−6	4	
(Thailand) 1982 King's Cup	Round 1	4	1	0	3	2	9	−7	2	
(Nepal) 1982 ANFA Coca Cola Tournament	Runners-up	4	2	0	2	5	5	0	4	
(Malaysia) 1983 Merdeka Tournament	Round 1	5	0	0	5	0	14	–14	0	
(Thailand) 1983 President's Gold Cup	Round 1	2	0	0	2	2	7	−5	0	
(Nepal) 1984 ANFA Cup	Runners-up	-	-	-	-	-	-	-	-	
(Pakistan) 1985 Quaid-e-Azam Tournament	Round 1	0	0	0	2	0	9	−9	1	
(Nepal) 1986 Panchayat Silver Jubilee Cup	4th	5	1	1	3	2	6	−4	3	
(Pakistan) 1986 Quaid-e-Azam Tournament	5th	3	1	1	3	4	17	−13	5	
(Nepal) 1986 ANFA Cup	Runners-up	4	2	1	1	unknown			3	
(Pakistan) 1987 Quaid-e-Azam Tournament	Round 1	3	0	0	3	0	0	5	−5	Nepal XI
(Nepal) 1987 ANFA Cup	Champions	unknown								
(Bangladesh) 1989 Aga Khan Gold Cup	-	-	-	-	-	-	-	-	-	
(Nepal) 1989 ANFA Cup	Runners-up	4	2	0	2	3	6	–2	4	
(India) 1995 Airlines Gold Cup	Unknown	-	-	-	-	-	-	-	-	
(India) 1997 Governor's Gold Cup	Champions	-	-	-	-	-	-	–	-	
(India) 1998 Governor's Gold Cup	Champions	3	3	0	0	8	2	+6	9	ANFA XI
(India) 1998 Durand Cup	Round 1	2	1	0	1	1	1	0	3	Nepal XI
(Bangladesh) 1999 Bangabandhu Cup	Round 1	2	0	0	2	1	3	−2	0	
(Nepal) 2000 ANFA Coca Cola Tournament	Runners-up	2	2	1	1	4	2	+2	7	Nepal Red
(Malaysia) 2008 Merdeka Tournament	Round 1	3	0	1	2	3	9	−6	1	
(Nepal) 2009 ANFA Cup	Champions	4	3	1	0	4	1	+3	10	Nepal Red
(India) 2012 Nehru Cup	Round 1	4	0	1	3	1	9	−8	1	
(Bangladesh) 2016 Bangabandhu Cup	Champions	5	3	2	0	8	1	+7	11	
(Bangladesh) 2018 Bangabandhu Cup	Group Stage	2	0	0	2	0	3	-3	11	
(Nepal) 2021 Three Nations Cup	Champions	3	1	2	0	1	1	+1	11	
(Nepal) 2023 Three Nations Cup	Champions	3	2	1	0	5	2	+3	7	
Total	7 titles	75	25	15	41	60	135	-75	73	

**Former rules, win = 2pts.

== Head-to-head record ==
Updated 31 March 2026 after match against Laos

Key
More wins
Equal wins/losses ratio
More losses

Nepal national football team head-to-head records
Opponent	From	To	Pld	W	D	L	GF	GA	GD	Confederation
Afghanistan	2003	2024	7	4	1	2	12	4	+8	AFC
Australia	2019	2021	2	0	0	2	0	8	-8	AFC
Bahrain	2024	2024	2	0	0	2	0	8	−8	AFC
Bangladesh	1982	2025	30	9	7	14	25	36	−11	AFC
Bhutan	1982	2023	15	13	2	0	45	7	+38	AFC
Brunei		2016	2	1	0	1	4	2	+2	AFC
Cambodia	2008	2008	1	1	0	0	1	0	+1	AFC
China	1972	1986	4	0	0	4	2	31	−29	AFC
Chinese Taipei	2019	2021	3	2	1	0	5	1	+4	AFC
Hong Kong	1988	2025	2	0	2	0	0	0	0	AFC
India	1985	2023	24	2	4	18	9	42	−33	AFC
Indonesia	2014	2022	2	0	0	2	0	9	−9	AFC
Iran	1982	1988	5	0	0	5	0	25	−25	AFC
Iraq	1982	2021	4	0	0	4	5	22	−17	AFC
Japan	1986	1998	5	0	0	5	0	28	−28	AFC
Jordan	2011	2022	5	0	1	4	1	18	-17	AFC
Kazakhstan	2001	2001	2	0	0	2	0	10	−10	UEFA
Kuwait	1982	2023	10	0	1	9	3	37	−34	AFC
Kyrgyzstan	2003	2009	2	0	1	1	1	3	−2	AFC
Laos	2016	2026	8	4	2	2	10	9	+1	AFC
Malaysia	1985	2025	9	1	1	7	3	21	−18	AFC
Macau	1997	2016	6	4	1	1	16	7	+9	AFC
Maldives	1984	2021	17	5	4	8	20	23	−3	AFC
Mauritius	2022	2022	2	2	0	0	2	0	+2	CAF
Myanmar	2008	2023	5	0	1	4	0	10	−10	AFC
North Korea	1985	2011	4	0	0	4	1	11	−10	AFC
Northern Mariana Islands	2013	2013	1	1	0	0	6	0	+6	AFC
Oman	1982	2022	13	0	0	13	3	52	−49	AFC
Pakistan	1982	2023	22	9	5	8	23	25	−2	AFC
Palestine	2009	2018	4	0	2	2	0	3	−3	AFC
Philippines	1982	2017	7	1	1	5	2	15	−13	AFC
Saudi Arabia	1984	1984	1	0	0	1	0	7	−7	AFC
Sri Lanka	1984	2021	17	4	7	6	20	25	−5	AFC
Singapore	1982	2025	5	2	0	3	2	12	−10	AFC
South Korea	1983	2003	8	0	0	8	1	55	−54	AFC
Syria	1988	2012	2	0	0	2	0	5	−5	AFC
Tajikistan	2017	2024	4	0	0	4	1	11	−10	AFC
Thailand	1982	2022	8	0	1	7	3	21	-18	AFC
Tibet	1972	1979	3	3	0	0	9	3	+6	CONIFA
Timor-Leste	2011	2022	4	2	2	0	9	3	+6	AFC
Turkmenistan	2002	2012	2	0	0	2	0	8	−8	AFC
United Arab Emirates	1984	2024	3	0	0	3	0	19	−19	AFC
Vietnam	2003	2025	3	0	0	3	1	10	−9	AFC
Yemen	2000	2024	6	0	2	4	3	11	−8	AFC
44 Countries	1972	2026	282	71	47	167	246	648	−402	FIFA
Last match updated was against Malaysia on 18 November 2025.

=== Regional record ===
Last meet up against South Asia countries
Opponents	Score	Year	Outcome	Match type
Afghanistan	16 November 2024	0−2	Won	Friendly
Bangladesh	27 September 2022	3−1	Won	Int'l Friendly
Bhutan	28 March 2023	1−1	Draw	2023 Three Nations Cup
India	24 June 2023	2−0	Lost	2023 SAFF Championship
Maldives	1 October 2021	0−1	Won	2021 SAFF Championship
Pakistan	8 December 2024	0−1	Won	2023 SAFF Championship
Sri Lanka	4 October 2021	2−3	Won	2021 SAFF Championship

== Honours ==
=== Continental ===
- AFC Solidarity Cup
  - (gold) Champions (1): 2016

=== Regional ===
- South Asian Games
  - (gold) Gold medal (2): 1984, 1993
  - (silver) Silver medal (2): 1987, 1999
  - (bronze) Bronze medal (1): 1985
- SAFF Championship
  - (silver) Runners-up (1): 2021
  - (bronze) Third place (1): 1993

=== Friendly ===
- ANFA Cup (2): 1987, 2009
- Governor's Gold Cup (2): 1997, 1998
- Bangabandhu Cup (1): 2016
- Three Nations Cup (1): 2021
- Prime Minister's Three Nations Cup (1): 2023

=== Awards ===
- SAFF Championship Fair Play Award (2): 2013, 2023

=== Summary ===
Only official honours are included, according to FIFA statutes (competitions organized/recognized by FIFA or an affiliated confederation).

Competition	1st place, gold medalist(s)	2nd place, silver medalist(s)	3rd place, bronze medalist(s)	Total
AFC Solidarity Cup	1	0	0	1
Total	1	0	0	1

== See also ==
- All Nepal Football Association
- Nepal national under-23 football team
- Nepal women's national football team
