= Torsten Spittler =

German football manager (born 1962)

Personal information
- Full name: Torsten Frank Spittler
- Date of birth: 7 November 1961 (age 64)
- Place of birth: Germany

Managerial career
- Years: Team
- 1993–1998: 1860 Munich (youth)
- 1998: Germany U16 (assistant)
- 1999: Nepal
- 2000: Perak FA
- 2003–2005: Yemen (technical director)
- 2005: Sierra Leone (technical director)
- 2006–2007: Okanagan Challenge
- 2009–2011: Mozambique (technical director)
- 2016–2017: Bhutan
- 2019: Myanmar U15
- 2020–2021: TuS Holzkirchen
- 2022–2023: Paro (technical director)
- 2023–2025: Rwanda

Torsten Frank Spittler (born 7 November 1961) is a German football manager.

== Coaching career ==
He started his career as a youth coach before becoming an assistant coach for the Germany Under-16 national team.

Spittler has been the football technical director in Mozambique. He was named Talent Development and Performance Expert for the Oman Football Association in October 2015.

He was the Perak FA manager for the 2000 season. He has also worked as coach and technical director for football in various countries such as Nepal, Yemen, Sierra Leone, India and Canada in conjunction with German Foreign Office, German Football Association (DFB) and Bavarian Football Association (BFV). From 2006 to 2007, he was head coach of Canadian side Okanagan Challenge of the Pacific Coast Soccer League after previously working in Canada as a touring-coach for the Alberta Soccer Association in 1999.

On 1 October 2016, Spittler became the head coach of Bhutan.

He was appointed as head coach of the Rwanda national team in November 2023, a role which he held until January 2025.

=== Managerial record ===
As of match played 28 December 2024

Managerial record by team and tenure
Team	Nat	From	To	Record					Ref.
Team	Nat	From	To	G	W	D	L	Win %	Ref.
Rwanda		2023	present	15	7	3	5	46.67	
Career Total				15	7	3	5	46.67	—
