= Eric Nshimiyimana =

Rwandan football coach and former player (born 1972)

Personal information
- Date of birth: 8 May 1972 (age 54)
- Place of birth: Bujumbura, Burundi
- Height: 1.95 m (6 ft 5 in)
- Position: Midfielder

Team information
- Current team: A.S. Kigali (head coach)

Senior career*
Years	Team	Apps	(Gls)
1994	Prince Louis		
1995–1998	APR		
1999	Kiyovu Sports		
2000–2005	APR		

International career
1996–2004	Rwanda		

Managerial career
- 2008: A.S. Kigali
- 2009–2010: Rwanda
- 2013–2014: Rwanda
- 2014: Kiyovu Sports
- 2014–2018: A.S. Kigali
- 2019–: A.S. Kigali
- * Club domestic league appearances and goals

Eric Nshimiyimana (born 8 May 1972) is a Rwandan football coach and former player. He currently coaches Rwanda National Football League side A.S. Kigali.

== Career ==
=== Playing career ===
Born in Bujumbura in Burundi, Nshimiyimana played as a midfielder for Prince Louis, APR and Kiyovu Sports.

He played for the Rwandan national team between 1996 and 2004, appearing in four FIFA World Cup qualifying matches for them. He was a squad member at the 2004 African Cup of Nations.

=== Coaching career ===
Nshimiyimana managed A.S. Kigali in 2008.

Nshimiyimana became an assistant coach for the Rwandan national team in April 2008, working with Raoul Shungu to assist manager Branko Tucak. When Tucak was sacked in November 2009, Nshimiyimana became interim manager of the national team. He was re-appointed manager in 2013; in April 2014 the Rwandan Football Association announced an 8-man shortlist to replace him after his contract expired on 30 June.

In June 2014 he was linked with the role of Kiyovu Sports manager, and he was appointed to the job in July 2014 ahead of the 2014–15 season.

He moved to coach A.S. Kigali later that month, being sacked by the club in October 2018. He returned to the club for a third time in July 2019. In December 2019 he was said to be close to being sacked, but in July 2020 he was offered a new contract by the club.
