= 2000 ANFA Cup =

2000 ANFA Coca Cola Invitational Tournament
ANFA Cup

Tournament details
- Country: Nepal
- Dates: January 2000
- Teams: 6

Final positions
- Champions: (South Korea) Soongsil
- Runners-up: Nepal Red (Note: Nepal Red was effectively a full national team)

Tournament statistics
- Matches played: 9
- Goals scored: 17 (1.89 per match)

The 2000 ANFA Cup, marketed as ANFA Coca Cola Invitational Tournament, was the twelfth edition of the ANFA Cup, a knock-out football tournament organized by the All Nepal Football Association. All matches were played at the Dasarath Rangasala Stadium in Kathmandu. Six teams participated in the tournament.

== Participating teams ==
- Nepal Red
- Nepal Blue (Note: Nepal Blue was a selection of Nepalese youth players)
- Bhutan
- (South Korea) Soongsil
- (Thailand) Air Force Central
- Bangladesh Army

== Group stage ==
=== Group A ===
Pos	Team	Pld	W	D	L	GF	GA	GD	Pts	Qualification
1	(South Korea) Soongsil	2	1	1	0	6	6	0	4	Knockout stage
2	Nepal Red (H)	2	1	1	0	1	0	+1	4	Knockout stage
3	Bhutan	2	0	0	2	0	7	−7	0	

Source: RSSSF
(H) Hosts

Bhutan	0–6	(South Korea) Soongsil

24 January 2000

Nepal Red	0–0	(South Korea) Soongsil

26 January 2000

Nepal Red	1–0	Bhutan

=== Group B ===
Pos	Team	Pld	W	D	L	GF	GA	GD	Pts	Qualification
1	(Thailand) Air Force Central	2	2	0	0	1	0	+1	6	Knockout stage
2	Nepal Blue (H)	2	1	0	1	2	1	+1	3	Knockout stage
3	Bangladesh Army	2	0	0	2	0	1	−1	0	

Source: RSSSF
(H) Hosts
25 January 2000

Nepal Blue	1–0	Bangladesh Army

27 January 2000

Nepal Blue	0–1	(Thailand) Air Force Central

Bangladesh Army	unknown	(Thailand) Air Force Central

== Bracket ==
Semi-finals
28 January
Nepal Blue	0
(South Korea) Soongsil	3
29 January
Nepal Red	3
(Thailand) Air Force Central	0

Final
31 January
(South Korea) Soongsil	2
Nepal Red	0

== Matches ==
=== Semi-finals ===
28 January 2000

Nepal Blue	0–3	(South Korea) Soongsil

29 January 2000

Nepal Red	3–0	(Thailand) Air Force Central

=== Final ===
31 January 2000

Soongsil (South Korea)	2–0	Nepal Red

== See also ==
- ANFA Cup
