= Rwanda national football team =

Men's national association football team

Rwanda
- Nickname: Amavubi (The Wasps)
- Association: Fédération Rwandaise de Football Association (FERWAFA)
- Confederation: CAF (Africa)
- Sub-confederation: CECAFA (East Africa)
- Head coach: Stephen Constantine
- Captain: Djihad Bizimana
- Most caps: Haruna Niyonzima (112)
- Top scorer: Olivier Karekezi (24)
- Home stadium: Amahoro Stadium
- FIFA code: RWA
First colours	Second colours

FIFA ranking
- Current: 119 ▲9 (7 October 2026)
- Highest: 64 (March 2015)
- Lowest: 178 (July 1999)

First international
- Burundi 6–2 Rwanda (Libreville, Gabon; 29 June 1976)

Biggest win
- Rwanda 9–0 Djibouti (Dar es Salaam, Tanzania; 13 December 2007)

Biggest defeat
- Cameroon 5–0 Rwanda (Libreville, Gabon; 7 July 1976); Zaire 6–1 Rwanda (Gabon; 12 July 1976); Tunisia 5–0 Rwanda (Tunis, Tunisia; 10 April 1983); Uganda 5–0 Rwanda (Kampala, Uganda; 1 August 1998)

Africa Cup of Nations
- Appearances: 1 (first in 2004)
- Best result: Group stage (2004)

African Nations Championship
- Appearances: 4 (first in 2011)
- Best result: Quarter-finals (2016, 2020)

The Rwanda national football team represents Rwanda in international football and is controlled by the Rwandan Football Federation, the governing body of football in Rwanda, and competes as a member of the Confederation of African Football (CAF), as well as the Council for East and Central Africa Football Associations (CECAFA), a CAF sub-confederation that governs football in East and Central Africa. The team bears the nickname Amavubi (Kinyarwanda for The Wasps), and primarily plays its home games at the Stade Amahoro in Kigali, the nation's capital. They have never qualified for a World Cup finals, and reached their only Africa Cup of Nations in 2004.

== History ==
Rwanda qualified for its first ever Africa Cup of Nations in the 2004 edition. At the tournament, they lost their opening match 2–1 to Tunisia before winning their first ever point in the competition after a 1–1 draw against Guinea. Rwanda went on to beat DR Congo in their final group match by a 1–0 scoreline, but it wasn't enough, as elsewhere in the group, Guinea and Tunisia drew, meaning both teams progressed to the quarter-finals, and Rwanda were eliminated.

On 3 November 2007, Josip Kuže was appointed as head coach of Rwanda on a three-year deal, but left just two months later to manage Japanese club JEF United Chiba, having managed just six matches. Raoul Shungu was appointed as interim manager on 11 April 2008, with Branko Tucak appointed on a permanent basis just over two months later. After Rwanda finished bottom of their group in the third round of 2010 FIFA World Cup qualifying, Tucak was sacked in November 2009, with Eric Nshimiyimana appointed as his replacement on an interim basis. In February 2010, Ghanaian Sellas Tetteh was appointed as the new national team manager. Under Tetteh, Rwanda qualified for the 2011 African Nations Championship, but finished bottom of their group after losing all three group stage matches. Tetteh resigned in September 2011.

Milutin Sredojević was appointed as Rwanda manager in November 2011, though he was sacked in April 2013. Nshimiyimana was reappointed to succeed Sredojević, though he was replaced by Stephen Constantine in May 2014. Under Constantine, Rwanda appeared to qualify for the group stage of qualifying for the 2015 Africa Cup of Nations, but were disqualified after fielding an ineligible player in a match against Congo. Constantine resigned from his role in January 2015 however, in order to manage the India national team.

Rwanda Football Federation technical director Lee Johnson became interim manager before Johnathan McKinstry was appointed as Constantine's replacement in March 2015, with Johnson leaving his role as technical director to become Constantine's assistant manager in India shortly after. In his first competitive game in charge, McKinstry guided Rwanda to their first away win in four years with a 1–0 victory over Mozambique in the opening round of 2017 African Nations Cup qualifying. In December 2015, Rwanda finished as runners-up in the CECAFA Senior Challenge Cup 2015, having lost 1–0 to Uganda in the final. In January 2016, Rwanda reached the knock-out stages of a major competition for the first time in their history after topping their group at the 2016 African Nations Championship. Rwanda did however lose to eventual champions, DR Congo, 2–1 after extra time in the quarter-final. In March 2016 McKinstry agreed a new two-year contract, though he was sacked just five months later, with Jimmy Mulisa appointed on an interim basis. The Rwanda Football Federation were later ordered by FIFA to compensate McKinstry $200,000 for unlawful dismissal, and though the Rwandan FA initially appealed this ruling, they later complied.

In November 2023, Torsten Spittler was appointed as head coach, though he was relieved of his duties in January 2025. Adel Amrouche was appointed in his place in March 2025.

== Team image ==
=== Kit ===
In 2001, after adopting the new flag of Rwanda, The Federation (FERWAFA) changed the color of the team kit. The new team kit consists of a yellow jersey, blue shorts and green socks for home matches, while their away kit is either all white or all blue. Adidas has generally been the manufacturer for the Rwandan team since 2001. However, between 2004 and 2009, Rwanda used L-sport as their outfitter, and in 2015 the side started wearing kit provided by AMS, an emerging Australian supplier.

=== Names ===
Under the official FIFA Trigramme the team's name is abbreviated as RWA; this acronym is used by FIFA, the CAF and the CECAFA to identify the team in official competitions. However the team was more commonly known as the RR, the acronym for the country's official name, Repubulika y'u Rwanda or République du Rwanda, which the local press used when they referred to the team as the RR XI. The national team is often referred to as Amavubi (The Wasps).

== Results and fixtures ==
The following is a list of match results in the last 12 months, as well as any future matches that have been scheduled.

Win Draw Loss Fixture

=== 2026 ===
27 March 2026 FIFA Series	Rwanda	4–0	Grenada	Kigali, Rwanda
21:00 UTC+2	L. Mickels 45+2'; J. Kwizera 45+6'; Bizimana 69'; Sahabo 83'	Report		Stadium: Amahoro Stadium; Referee: Haimanot Adane (Ethiopia)

30 March 2026 FIFA Series	Rwanda	2–0	Estonia	Kigali, Rwanda
19:30 UTC+2	Biramahire 30'; L. Mickels 51'	Report		Stadium: Amahoro Stadium; Referee: Ahmed Hassan Hussein (Somalia)

6 June Friendly	Rwanda	Cancelled	Comoros	Marrakesh, Morocco

8 June Friendly	Tanzania	Cancelled	Rwanda
21:00 UTC+1

25 September 2027 AFCON qualification	Rwanda	3–1	Liberia	Kigali, Rwanda
18:00 UTC+0	Biramahire 2'; Mugisha 33'; Mickels 44' (pen.)	Report		Stadium: Amahoro Stadium; Attendance: 45,508 (Full house); Referee: Hillary Hambaba (Zambia); Assistant referees: Trywell Nyirenda (Zambia); Francis Swaba (Zambia); Fourth official: Chanshi Kasongo (Zambia)

29 September 2027 AFCON qualification	Cape Verde	1-2	Rwanda	TBD, Cape Verde
18:00 UTC+0	Benchimol 40		Niyomugabo 45+2' Iradukunda 52'	Stadium: TBD

11 November 2027 AFCON qualification	Mali	v	Rwanda	TBD, Mali
TBD				Stadium: TBD

15 November 2027 AFCON qualification	Rwanda	v	Mali	TBD, Rwanda
TBD				Stadium: TBD

=== 2027 ===
24 March 2027 AFCON qualification	Liberia	v	Rwanda	TBD, Liberia
TBD				Stadium: TBD

28 March 2027 AFCON qualification	Rwanda	v	Cape Verde	TBD, Rwanda
TBD				Stadium: TBD

== Coaching history ==
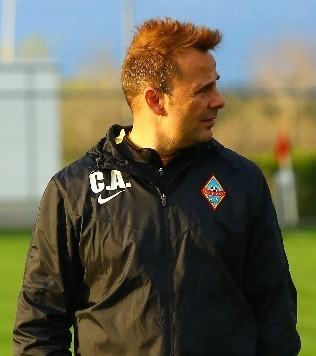
Carlos Alós was the manager of Rwanda between 2022 and 2023

Caretaker managers are listed in italics.

- (West Germany) Otto Pfister (1972–76)
- (Turkey) Metin Türel (1991)
- (Rwanda) Longin Rudasingwa (1998-1999)
- (Germany) Rudi Gutendorf (1999–00)
- (Rwanda) Longin Rudasingwa (2000–01)
- (Serbia and Montenegro) Ratomir Dujković (2001–04)
- (Sweden) Roger Palmgren (2004–05)
- (Germany) Michael Nees (2006–07)
- (Croatia) Josip Kuže (2007–08)
- (Democratic Republic of the Congo) Raoul Shungu (2008)
- (Croatia) Branko Tucak (2008–09)
- (Rwanda) Eric Nshimiyimana (2009–10)
- (Ghana) Sellas Tetteh (2010–11)
- (Serbia) Milutin Sredojević (2011–13)
- (Rwanda) Eric Nshimiyimana (2013–14)
- (England) Stephen Constantine (2014–2015)
- (England) Lee Johnson (2015)
- (Northern Ireland) Johnny McKinstry (2015–16)
- (Rwanda) Gilbert Kanyankore (2016)
- (Rwanda) Jimmy Mulisa (2016)
- (Germany) Antoine Hey (2017–2018)
- (Rwanda) Vincent Mashami (2018–2022)
- (Spain) Carlos Alós (2022–2023)
- (France) Gerard Buscher (2023)
- (Germany) Torsten Spittler (2023–2025)
- (Algeria) Adel Amrouche (2025–2026)
- (England) Stephen Constantine (2026–)

== Players ==
=== Current squad ===
The following players were named in the provisional squad for the 2027 Africa Cup of Nations qualification matches against Liberia and Cape Verde on 25 and 29 September 2026; respectively.

Caps and goals correct as of 5 June 2025, after the match against Algeria.

No.	Pos.	Player	Date of birth (age)	Caps	Goals	Club
	GK	Fiacre Ntwari	25 September 1999 (age 27)	21	0	(South African Football Association) Kruger United
	GK	Adolphe Hakizimana	5 February 2002 (age 24)	1	0	(Rwanda Football Federation) APR
	GK	Patience Niyongira	9 May 2000 (age 26)	0	0	(Rwanda Football Federation) Police
	GK	Yves Mugisha		0	0	(Rwanda Football Federation) Rayon Sports
	DF	Emmanuel Imanishimwe	2 February 1995 (age 31)	46	0	(All India Football Federation) Chennaiyin
	DF	Ange Mutsinzi	15 November 1997 (age 28)	30	1	(Association of Football Federations of Azerbaijan) Zira
	DF	Gilbert Mugisha	18 July 1996 (age 30)	19	3	(Botswana Football Association) Jwaneng Galaxy
	DF	Claude Niyomugabo	2 August 1998 (age 28)	12	0	Free agent
	DF	Jojea Kwizera	1 January 1999 (age 27)	11	2	(United States Soccer Federation) Rhode Island FC
	DF	Clement Niyigena	17 February 2001 (age 25)	5	0	(Egyptian Football Association) Smouha
	DF	Phanuel Kavita	9 March 1993 (age 33)	1	0	(United States Soccer Federation) Birmingham Legion FC
	DF	Leroy-Jacques Mickels	25 June 1995 (age 31)	0	0	(German Football Association) Waldhof Mannheim
	DF	Gilbert Byiringiro	1 July 2000 (age 26)	0	0	(Rwanda Football Federation) APR
	DF	Noam Emeran	24 September 2002 (age 24)	0	0	(Swiss Football Association) Lausanne Ouchy
	DF	Darryl Nkulikiyimana	24 May 2005 (age 21)	0	0	(Royal Belgian Football Association) Standard Liège
	DF	Obed Uwumukiza	1 January 1998 (age 28)	0	0	(Rwanda Football Federation) Rayon Sports
	MF	Djihad Bizimana (captain)	12 December 1996 (age 29)	47	3	(Algerian Football Federation) CS Constantine
	MF	Kevin Muhire	17 October 1998 (age 28)	38	0	(Sudan Football Association) Jamus
	MF	Bonheur Mugisha	1 January 2000 (age 26)	16	0	(Saudi Arabian Football Federation) Al-Hazem
	MF	Samuel Gueulette	19 May 2000 (age 26)	11	0	(Romanian Football Federation) UTA Arad
	MF	Hakim Hamis		0	0	(Rwanda Football Federation) Kiyovu Sports
	MF	Keddy Nsanzimfura	1 August 2003 (age 23)	0	0	(Rwanda Football Federation) Kiyovu Sports
	FW	Innocent Nshuti	31 January 1998 (age 28)	19	4	(Libyan Football Federation) Al-Wefaq Ajdabiya
	FW	Abeddy Biramahire	4 October 1998 (age 28)	12	2	(Saudi Arabian Football Federation) Al-Batin
	FW	Joy-Lance Mickels	29 March 1994 (age 32)	0	0	(Association of Football Federations of Azerbaijan) Sabah
	FW	Joy-Slayd Mickels	29 March 1994 (age 32)	0	0	(Malta Football Association) Hibernians
	FW	Taiba Mbonyumwami	6 May 1995 (age 31)	0	0	(Ethiopian Football Federation) Ethiopian Coffee
	FW	Fidal Uwiyaremye		0	0	(Rwanda Football Federation) APR

=== Recent call-ups ===
The following players have been called up for Rwanda in the last 12 months.

Pos.	Player	Date of birth (age)	Caps	Goals	Club	Latest call-up
GK	Olivier Kwizera	30 July 1995 (age 31)	3	0	(Rwanda) APR	v. Comoros, 6 June 2026
GK	Hugo Bigirimana	4 March 2005 (age 21)	0	0	(Switzerland) La Chaux-de-Fonds	2026 FIFA Series
DF	Yunus Nshimiyimana	31 December 2001 (age 24)	0	0	(Rwanda) APR	v. Comoros, 6 June 2026
DF	Thierry Manzi	12 July 1996 (age 30)	40	4	(Libya) Al Ahli	2026 FIFA Series
MF	Jean Bosco Ruboneka	1 January 1999 (age 27)	12	0	(Rwanda) APR	v. Comoros, 6 June 2026
MF	Johan Kury	7 October 2001 (age 25)	0	0	(Switzerland) Bellinzona	v. Comoros, 6 June 2026
MF	Hakim Sahabo	16 June 2005 (age 21)	9	0	(Greece) AEK Athens	2026 FIFA Series
MF	Sven Kalisa	14 March 1997 (age 29)	0	0	(Luxembourg) Etzella Ettelbruck	2026 FIFA Series
FW	René Uwineza		0	0	(Rwanda) Kiyovu Sports	v. Comoros, 6 June 2026
FW	Lague Byiringiro	25 October 2000 (age 26)	13	1	(Rwanda) Police	2026 FIFA Series
FW	David Niyo	23 June 2007 (age 19)	0	0	(Ukraine) Veres Rivne	2026 FIFA Series
FW	Karl Matteo Ndayishimiye		0	0	(Belgium) Wilrijk	2026 FIFA Series
^{DEC} Player refused to join the team after the call-up.; ^{INJ} Player withdrew from the squad due to an injury.; ^{PRE} Preliminary squad.; ^{RET} Player has retired from international football.; ^{SUS} Serving suspension.

== Player records ==
As of 14 October 2025
Players in bold are still active with Rwanda.

=== Most appearances ===
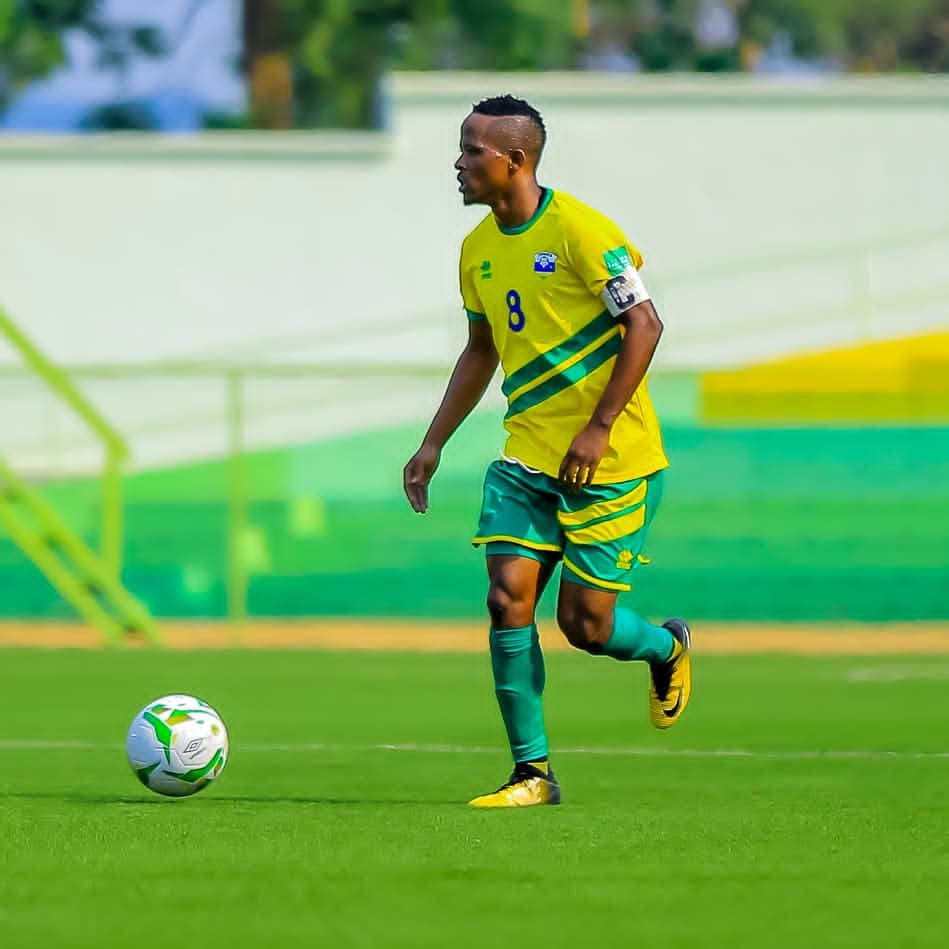
Haruna Niyonzima is Rwanda's most capped player with 112 appearances.

Rank	Name	Caps	Goals	Career
1	Haruna Niyonzima	112	6	2006–2022
2	Jean-Baptiste Mugiraneza	89	6	2006–2018
3	**Fitina Omborenga**	79	1	2013–present
4	Jean-Claude Iranzi	76	3	2008–2019
5	**Djihad Bizimana**	70	3	2015–present
5	Olivier Karekezi	70	24	2000–2013
7	Jean-Luc Ndayishimiye	64	0	2007–2019
8	**Meddie Kagere**	60	15	2011–present
9	Jacques Tuyisenge	59	16	2011–2022
10	**Thierry Manzi**	57	4	2016–present

=== Top goalscorers ===
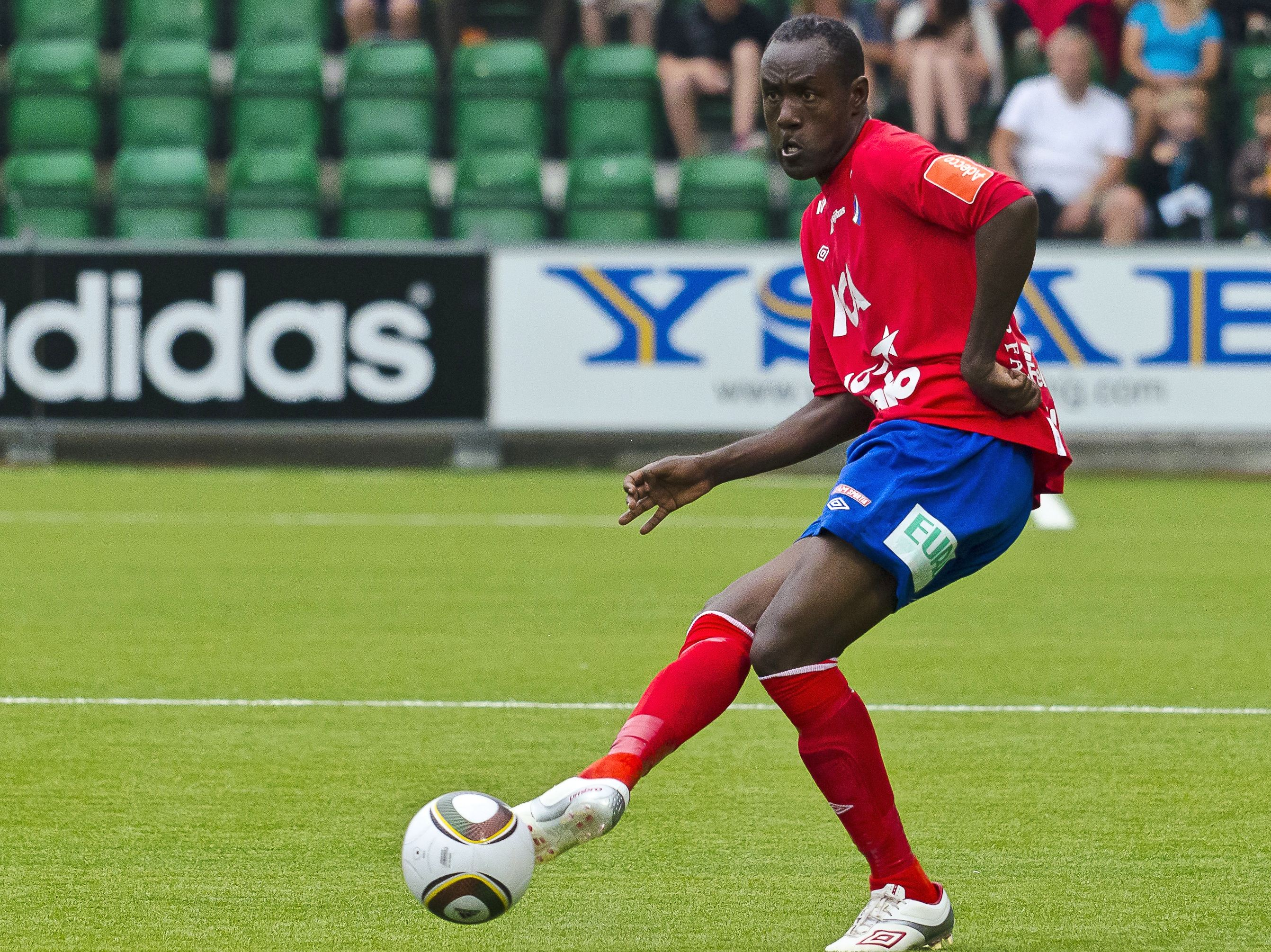
Olivier Karekezi is Rwanda's top scorer with 24 goals.

Rank	Name	Goals	Caps	Ratio	Career
1	Olivier Karekezi	24	70	0.34	2000–2013
2	Jacques Tuyisenge	16	59	0.27	2011–2022
3	**Meddie Kagere**	15	60	0.25	2011–present
4	Jean Lomami	14	25	0.56	2003–2009
5	Labama Bokota	13	33	0.39	2007–2012
6	Ernest Sugira	12	36	0.33	2015–2022
7	Saïd Makasi	9	26	0.35	2003–2009
8	Jimmy Gatété	8	41	0.2	1996–2009
9	Daddy Birori	7	25	0.28	2009–2014
9	**Muhadjiri Hakizimana**	7	35	0.2	2016–present

== Competition records ==
=== FIFA World Cup ===
FIFA World Cup record									Qualification record					
Year	Round	Position	Pld	W	D*	L	GF	GA	Pld	W	D	L	GF	GA
(Argentina) 1978	Not a FIFA member								Not a FIFA member					
(Spain) 1982	Did not enter								Declined participation					
(Mexico) 1986	Did not enter								Declined participation					
(Italy) 1990	Withdrew								Withdrew					
(United States) 1994	Did not enter								Declined participation					
(France) 1998	Did not qualify								2	0	0	2	1	5
(South Korea) (Japan) 2002	Did not qualify								2	0	1	1	2	4
(Germany) 2006	Did not qualify								12	2	3	7	10	17
(South Africa) 2010	Did not qualify								10	3	2	5	8	11
(Brazil) 2014	Did not qualify								8	1	3	4	7	13
(Russia) 2018	Did not qualify								2	0	0	2	1	4
(Qatar) 2022	Did not qualify								8	2	1	5	12	9
(Canada) (Mexico) (United States) 2026	Did not qualify								10	3	2	5	5	9
(Morocco) (Portugal) (Spain) 2030	To be determined													
(Saudi Arabia) 2034	To be determined													
Total		0/11							54	11	12	31	46	72

=== Africa Cup of Nations ===
Africa Cup of Nations record
Appearances: 1
Year	Round	Position	Pld	W	D	L	GF	GA
(Sudan) 1957	Part of Belgium							
(United Arab Republic) 1959	Part of Belgium							
(Ethiopia) 1962	Part of Belgium							
(Ghana) 1963	Not affiliated to CAF							
(Tunisia) 1965	Not affiliated to CAF							
(Ethiopia) 1968	Not affiliated to CAF							
(Sudan) 1970	Not affiliated to CAF							
(Cameroon) 1972	Not affiliated to CAF							
(Egypt) 1974	Not affiliated to CAF							
(Ethiopia) 1976	Not affiliated to CAF							
(Ghana) 1978	Did not enter							
(Nigeria) 1980	Did not enter							
(Libya) 1982	Did not qualify							
(Ivory Coast) 1984	Did not qualify							
(Egypt) 1986	Did not enter							
(Morocco) 1988	Withdrew							
(Algeria) 1990	Did not enter							
(Senegal) 1992	Did not enter							
(Tunisia) 1994	Did not enter							
(South Africa) 1996	Did not enter							
(Burkina Faso) 1998	Did not enter							
(Ghana) (Nigeria) 2000	Did not qualify							
(Mali) 2002	Did not qualify							
(Tunisia) 2004	Group stage	9th	3	1	1	1	3	3
(Egypt) 2006	Did not qualify							
(Ghana) 2008	Did not qualify							
(Angola) 2010	Did not qualify							
(Equatorial Guinea) (Gabon) 2012	Did not qualify							
(South Africa) 2013	Did not qualify							
(Equatorial Guinea) 2015	Disqualified							
(Gabon) 2017	Did not qualify							
(Egypt) 2019	Did not qualify							
(Cameroon) 2021	Did not qualify							
(Ivory Coast) 2023	Did not qualify							
(Morocco) 2025	Did not qualify							
(Kenya) (Tanzania) (Uganda) 2027	To be determined							
2029	To be determined							
Total	Group stage	1/35	3	1	1	1	3	3

=== African Nations Championship ===
African Nations Championship record
Appearances: 4
Year	Round	Position	Pld	W	D	L	GF	GA
(Ivory Coast) 2009	Did not qualify							
(Sudan) 2011	Group stage	16th	3	0	0	3	2	7
(South Africa) 2014	Did not qualify							
(Rwanda) 2016	Quarter-finals	5th	4	2	0	2	5	7
(Morocco) 2018	Group stage	13th	3	1	1	1	1	1
(Cameroon) 2020	Quarter-finals	7th	4	1	2	1	3	3
(Algeria) 2022	Did not qualify							
(Kenya) (Tanzania) (Uganda) 2024	Did not qualify							
Total	Quarter-finals	4/8	14	4	3	7	11	18

== Honours ==
=== Regional ===
- CECAFA Cup
  - (gold) Champions (1): 1999
  - (silver) Runners-up (6): 2003, 2005, 2007, 2009, 2011, 2015
  - (bronze) Third place (4): 1999, 2001, 2002, 2006

Friendly

- FIFA Series
  - (gold) Champions (1): 2026 Rwanda

== See also ==
- Rwanda national under-17 football team
