= Longin Rudasingwa =

Rwandan professional football manager

Personal information
- Date of birth: ?
- Place of birth: Rwanda

Managerial career
- Years: Team
- 1995–2000: Rayon Sports F.C.
- 1998–199x: Rwanda
- 2000–2001: Rwanda

Longin Rudasingwa is a Rwandan professional football manager.

== Career ==
From 1995 until 2000 he coached the Rayon Sports F.C. In 1998, he became a head coach of the Rwanda national football team. After resignation Rudi Gutendorf in October 2000 he again worked as manager of the Rwanda team.

== Honours ==
- Rwandan Premier League: 2

1997, 1998

- Rwandan Cup: 2

1995, 1998

- CECAFA Clubs Cup: 1

1998
