= Branko Tucak =

Croatian footballer (born 1952)

Personal information
- Date of birth: 19 June 1952 (age 74)
- Place of birth: Runović, PR Croatia, FPR Yugoslavia
- Height: 1.85 m (6 ft 1 in)
- Position: Defender

Senior career*
Years	Team	Apps	(Gls)
–1977	NK Zagreb		
1977–1981	Dinamo Zagreb		
1981–1983	Metz	66	(4)
1983–1984	Nancy	22	(0)
1984–1985	Angers	24	(0)
1985–1986	Kortrijk		
1986–1987	Thionville	11	(0)

Managerial career
- 1993–1994: Šibenik
- 1995–1996: Hrvatski Dragovoljac
- 1997–1998: NK Zagreb
- 1998–1999: Hrvatski Dragovoljac
- 2004: Al-Hilal Omdurman
- 2005: Al-Merrikh
- 2006: Pula 1856
- 2008–2009: Rwanda
- * Club domestic league appearances and goals

Branko Tucak (born 19 June 1952) is a Croatian football coach and former player who most recently coached the Rwanda national team.

== Playing career ==
Tucak played for NK Zagreb, Dinamo Zagreb, Metz, AS Nancy, Angers, Kortrijk and Thionville.

== Coaching career ==
Tucak was appointed manager of the Rwanda national team in April 2008, and was sacked in November 2009. He has also coached in Croatia, France, Kuwait and Sudan.

In April 2014 it was announced that he was part of an eight-man shortlist to replace Eric Nshimiyimana as Rwanda manager.
