= Stephen Constantine =

English football manager (born 1962)

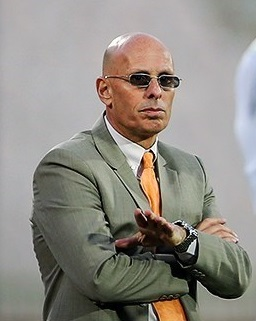
- Constantine as India manager in 2018

Personal information
- Date of birth: 16 October 1962 (age 64)
- Place of birth: London, England

Team information
- Current team: Rwanda (manager)

Senior career*
Years	Team	Apps	(Gls)
- Pennsylvania Stoners
- New York Pancyprian-Freedoms

Managerial career
- 1999–2001: Nepal
- 2002–2005: India
- 2007–2008: Malawi
- 2009–2010: Sudan
- 2010: APEP
- 2010–2012: Nea Salamis
- 2012–2013: Ethnikos Achna
- 2014–2015: Rwanda
- 2015–2019: India
- 2021: Pafos
- 2022–2023: East Bengal
- 2023–2024: Pakistan
- 2025: Pakistan
- 2025–2026: APEA Akrotiri
- 2026–: Rwanda
- * Club domestic league appearances and goals

Stephen Constantine (born 16 October 1962) is an English professional football coach and former player who is the manager of Rwanda.

== Early and personal life ==
Constantine was born on 16 October 1962 in London. He is of Greek-Cypriot descent. He is a fan of English club Arsenal. Constantine is married and has three daughters; his family were living in Cyprus while he was coaching in Sudan.

== Playing career ==
Constantine played in the United States for the Pennsylvania Stoners and the New York Pancyprian-Freedoms. He retired from playing at the age of 26, following a serious knee injury.

== Coaching career ==
After retiring from playing, Constantine spent his early coaching career in the United States and Cyprus.

=== Nepal ===
Constantine coached the Nepal national team between 1999 and 2001. He led the national side to the runners-up position at the 1999 South Asian Games. The next year, he was awarded the Order of Gorkha Dakshina Bahu award by the country's King.

=== India ===
Constantine was then manager of the India national team from 2002 to 2005. He also guided the Indian team winning silver medal at the 2003 Afro-Asian Games. After leaving India he was a first-team coach for English club Millwall during the 2005–06 season. He has also worked in England for AFC Bournemouth.

=== Malawi ===
In January 2007, he was on a two-man shortlist, alongside Carlos Alberto da Luz, for the manager's job of the Malawi national team. He was named as Malawi manager in February 2007, with the role beginning on 1 March 2007. He resigned in April 2008.

=== Sudan ===
He became manager of the Sudan national team in February 2009.

=== Clubs in Cyprus and Greece ===
After leaving Sudan he managed in the Cypriot domestic leagues with APEP and Nea Salamis Famagusta, the latter of which he guided to promotion in the Cypriot First Division. He was also manager of Ethnikos Achna from December 2012 to February 2013.

In July 2013, he was linked with the Jamaica national team vacancy. He became the assistant manager of Greek club Apollon Smyrnis in November 2013. He set up the British Coaches Abroad Association in November 2013.

=== Rwanda ===
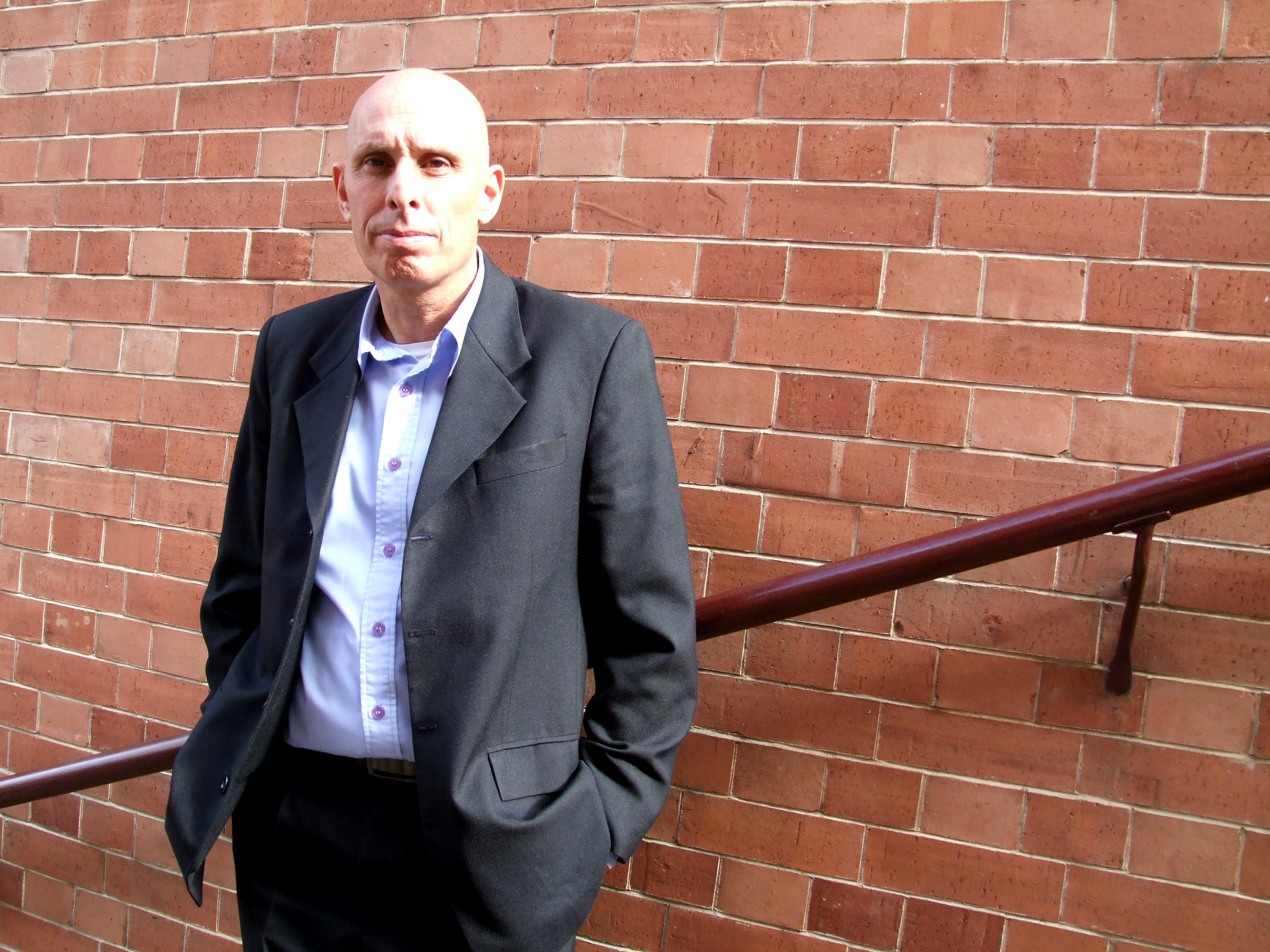
Constantine in 2014

He became manager of the Rwanda national team in May 2014, taking charge of his first match in June. He stated his aim was to build a team strong enough to challenge for the 2016 African Nations Championship, which Rwanda were due to host. In December 2014 Rwanda attained their highest ever ranking, of 68th position. Later that month he was linked with a return to India as their new national manager, and in early January 2015 he was offered the position.

=== Return to India ===
In December 2014, it was reported that Constantine would become the next head coach of India again, after Wim Koevermans' contract ran out. He would beat the favourite for the position, Ricki Herbert. On 16 January 2015, it was confirmed that Constantine had returned to take over India for a second stint.

His first match as India head coach came on 12 March 2015 in the qualifier against Nepal at the Indira Gandhi Athletic Stadium. Two goals from Sunil Chhetri lead India to a 2–0 victory and lead going into the second leg in Kathmandu. A 0–0 draw at the Dasarath Rangasala Stadium saw India progress to the next round of World Cup/Asian Cup qualifying. As a result of India's top results against Nepal, the country saw a rise by 26 in the April FIFA World Rankings to 147.

In April 2015, it was announced that India would be placed in Group D for the World Cup/Asian Cup qualifiers with Asia's top side, Iran, as well as Oman, Turkmenistan, and Guam. India came bottom of the group, winning only one game.

In January 2016, Constantine led India to the SAFF Championship title, beating Afghanistan 2–1 in the final. He led India to 100th in the FIFA rankings as of June 2017. The win against Kyrgyzstan in June was India's eighth in a row. The unbeaten streak ran to 13 games, including 11 wins, but ended with a 2–1 defeat to Kyrgyzstan in March 2018. In 2016 he rejected the opportunity to manage English League One club Port Vale.

During the unbeaten run, India qualified for the 2019 AFC Asian Cup. In June 2018, India won the Intercontinental Cup, beating Kenya in the final. Afterwards, Constantine was named Sports Illustrated Coach of the Year in India.

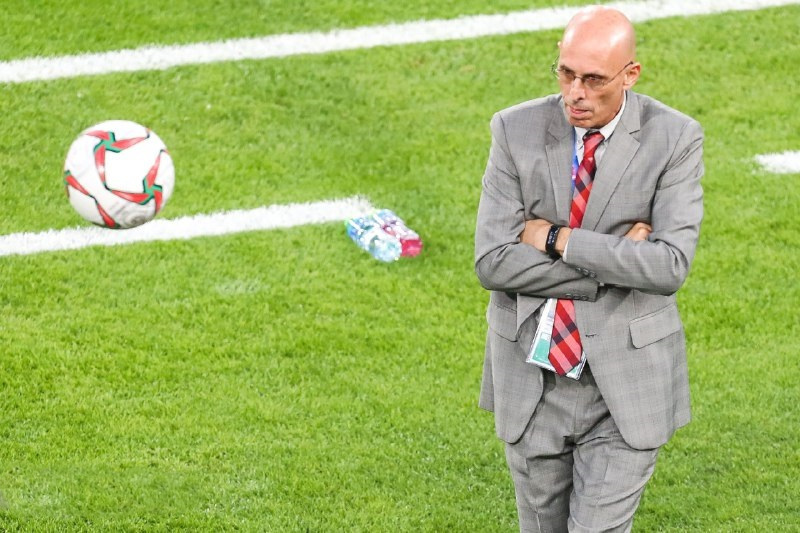
Constantine as manager of India at the 2019 AFC Asian Cup.

At the 2019 Asian Cup, Constantine said he was aiming for progression from the group stages. The team won their opening game against Thailand, but finished fourth in their group after conceding a last-minute penalty in their final group game against Bahrain, and Constantine resigned from his position as manager. After his resignation, the All India Football Federation president Praful Patel said: "It's been a wonderful journey. We have travelled a long distance together, and the world has seen it all." Constantine took India from 173 in the FIFA World Rankings in March 2015 to 97 in December 2018.

=== Pafos ===
In January 2021 he became chief football operations officer at Cypriot club Pafos. In February 2021 he was appointed head coach. His contract expired on 30 June 2021.

=== East Bengal ===
In January 2022 he was linked with the vacant role as the Singapore national team manager. In July 2022 he became head coach of Indian Super League club East Bengal. He left the position in April 2023.

=== Pakistan ===
On 30 September 2023, Constantine was announced as the head coach of the Pakistan national football team.

Constantine led Pakistan to their first-ever victory in World Cup qualifiers in their first fixture at home in 8 years by beating Cambodia, and qualifying for the second round for the first time. He left the role in November 2024.

On 3 March 2025, Constantine was appointed again solely for the match against Syria at the 2027 AFC Asian Cup qualification third round, with a decision on a long-term role to be made later. Constantine was retained until June, for the Myanmar game.

=== Return to Rwanda ===
After a spell with Cypriot club APEA Akrotiri, Constantine signed a two-year deal to return as the manager of Rwanda in March 2026.

== FIFA ==
Constantine has worked as a FIFA Instructor, and is a member of FIFA's elite coaching panel.

== Other ==
In March 2018, Constantine's autobiography, From Delhi to the Den, was nominated for the Football Writers' Association book of the year, part of the British Sports Book Awards.

As of January 2025, no other Englishman had managed as many foreign national teams as Constantine.
