= 2014–15 Sri Lanka Football Premier League =

Sri Lanka Football Premier League
- Season: 2014–15
- Champions: Solid
- AFC Cup: Solid
- Matches: 203
- Goals: 593 (2.92 per match)
- Top goalscorer: Mohamed Isadeen
- Biggest home win: Army 8-0 Pelicans (10 August 2014); Army 8-0 Don Bosco (23 August 2014); Army 8-0 Crystal Palace (23 August 2014)
- Biggest away win: Nandimithra 1-8 Army (6 September 2014)
- Highest scoring: Saunders 3-8 Crystal Palace (11 September 2014)
- Longest winning run: Army; Negambo Youth; SL Navy (5)
- Longest unbeaten run: Negambo Youth (14)
- Longest winless run: Kalutara Park (11)
- Longest losing run: Thihariya Youth (7)

2014 saw the 30th edition of the Sri Lanka Football Premier League. The season featured 22 teams, an expansion of two clubs. Air Force SC were the defending champions. In this season, Solid SC won the champions title after joining the league 2 years earlier. The teams played round-robin matches.

== Clubs ==
Club Name	Location	Stadium	Capacity
Air Force Sports Club	Ekala	Ekala Football Ground	1,000
Blue Star SC	Kalutara	Kalutara Stadium	15,000
Colombo FC	Colombo	Sugathadasa Stadium	28,000
Crystal Palace SC	Gampola	Jayathilake Stadium	5,000
Don Bosco SC	Negombo	Don Bosco Ground	1,000
Java Lane SC	Colombo	City Football Complex	1,000
Kalutara Park SC	Kalutara	Kalutara Stadium	15,000
Matara City SC	Matara	Matara Football Complex	2,000
Nandimithra SC	Colombo	Kelaniya Football Complex	1,000
Negambo Youth	Negombo	Maristella Ground	1,000
New Young's SC	Wennappuwa	Sir Albert F. Peiries Stadium	5,000
Pelicans SC	Kurunegala	Maliga Pitiya Ground	3,000
Renown Sports Club	Colombo	CR & FC Grounds	2,500
Saunders SC	Colombo	Kelaniya Football Complex	1,000
SL Navy SC	Welisara	Navy Ground	1,000
Solid SC	Anuradhapura	Prison Ground	2,000
Sri Lanka Army SC	Homagama	Homagama Ground	5,000
Sri Lanka Police SC	Colombo	Police Ground	1,000
Super Sun SC	Dharga Town	Zahira College Ground	1,000
Thihariya Youth SC	Gampaha	Sugathadasa Stadium	28,000
Up Country Lions SC	Nawalapitiya	Jayathilake Stadium	5,000

== Table ==
Pos	Team	Pld	W	D	L	GF	GA	GD	Pts
1	Solid SC (C)	20	15	3	2	44	14	+30	48
2	Colombo FC	20	14	3	3	48	24	+24	45
3	Army SC	20	13	3	4	75	16	+59	42
4	Negambo Youth	20	12	5	3	33	16	+17	41
5	Navy SC	20	12	4	4	30	15	+15	40
6	Country Lions	20	10	3	7	28	20	+8	33
7	Blue Star SC	20	8	8	4	25	23	+2	32
8	Air Force	20	8	8	4	24	16	+8	32
9	Super Sun	20	7	7	6	30	29	+1	28
10	Renown	20	7	6	7	34	37	−3	27
11	New Young's	20	8	2	10	26	32	−6	26
12	Nandimithra	20	7	3	10	30	38	−8	24
13	Saunders	20	6	5	9	21	25	−4	23
14	Java Lane	20	6	5	9	22	29	−7	23
15	Pelicans	20	5	7	8	22	42	−20	22
16	Don Bosco	20	5	5	10	21	39	−18	20
17	Crystal Palace	20	5	5	10	33	46	−13	20
18	Matara	20	3	7	10	16	33	−17	16
19	Police	20	2	7	11	22	35	−13	13
20	Kalutara Park	20	1	8	11	12	35	−23	11
21	Thihariya Youth	20	3	2	15	16	48	−32	11

Source: Soccerway
(C) Champions

== Champions ==
Solid SC from Anuradhapura are the Champions of Sri Lanka Football Premier League 2014-15 season.
