= List of football clubs in Sri Lanka =

Football is one of the most famous games in Sri Lanka just behind cricket. Most football clubs are based in main cities like Colombo, Kandy, Negambo and Kalutara. There are five football competitions in Sri Lanka. They are Sri Lanka Football Premier League, Division I, Division II, Division III, Sri Lanka FA Cup and Dialog champions league

== A ==
- Air Force SC - Kelaniya

== B ==
- Blue Star SC - Kalutara
- Berberyn SC - Beruwala
- al aqsha SC - Bandarawela

== C ==
- Colombo FC - Colombo

== D ==
- Don Bosco SC - Negombo
- Defenders FC - Homagama

== F ==
- Fortuna FC - Kelaniya

== J ==
- Java Lane SC - Colombo

== K ==
- Kalutara Park SC - Kalutara
- KB Football Club - Dharga Town

== N ==
- Navy Sea Hawks FC - Football team of Sri Lanka Navy
- Negombo Youth SC - Negombo
- New Rome SC - Negombo
- New Young's SC - Wennappuwa

== P ==
- Pelicans SC - Kurunegala
- Police SC - Colombo

== R ==
- Ratnam SC - Colombo
- Real SC - Ratmalana
- Renown SC - Colombo
- Retros FC - Colombo

== S ==
- Saunders SC - Colombo
- Sunrise FC - Kandy
- Solid SC - Anuradhapura
- Super Sun SC - Beruwala
- Serendib FC - Mawenalla

== U ==
- Up Country Lions SC - Nawalapitiya
- United Sports Club - Vidattaltivu
- United FC - Puttalam

== V ==
- Victory SC - Trincomalee

== Z ==
- Zavia SC - Dharga Town
