= 2013 Sri Lanka Football Premier League =

Sri Lanka Football Premier League
- Season: 2013

2013 saw the 29th edition of the Sri Lanka Football Premier League. This season featured 20 teams, an expansion of eight clubs, split into two groups of 10. The top four sides at the end of a round robin entered the final phase.

Air Force SC defeated Renown SC 1–0 in the final to win the tournament. Ratnam Sports Club were the defending champions, but were knocked out in the quarterfinals.

== Group A ==
Pos	Team	Pld	W	D	L	GF	GA	GD	Pts
1	Colombo FC	18	11	4	3	48	14	+34	37
2	Ratnam SC	18	11	4	3	37	20	+17	37
3	Blue Star	18	10	5	3	25	11	+14	35
4	Air Force SC	18	8	4	6	25	17	+8	28
5	Navy SC	18	7	5	6	24	20	+4	26
6	Saunders SC	16	6	6	4	15	10	+5	24
7	Matara SC	17	3	6	8	18	33	−15	15
8	Java Lane SC	17	3	6	8	16	38	−22	15
9	Negambo Youth	17	1	7	9	14	32	−18	10
10	Super Sun SC	17	1	5	11	10	37	−27	8

Source: soccerway.com

== Group B ==
Pos	Team	Pld	W	D	L	GF	GA	GD	Pts
1	Army SC	18	11	4	3	45	16	+29	37
2	Don Bosco SC	18	10	3	5	32	17	+15	33
3	Renown SC	18	9	5	4	32	24	+8	32
4	Solid SC	18	8	6	4	30	19	+11	30
5	Nandimithra SC	18	7	5	6	24	32	−8	26
6	Up Country Lions SC	18	6	5	7	27	33	−6	23
7	Kalutara Park SC	18	5	5	8	20	29	−9	20
8	New Young SC	18	4	4	10	23	32	−9	16
9	Police SC	18	4	4	10	20	36	−16	16
10	Pelicans SC	18	3	5	10	20	35	−15	14

Source: soccerway.com

== Final stage ==
=== Bracket ===
Quarter-finals
A2	Ratnam SC	1 (3)
B3	Solid SC	1 (4)
A4	Air Force SC	2
B1	Army SC	1
A3	Blue Star SC	0
B2	Renown SC	1
A1	Colombo FC	2
B4	Don Bosco SC	3

Semi-finals
B3	Solid SC	1
A4	Air Force SC	2
B2	Renown SC	2
B4	Don Bosco SC	0

Final
A4	Air Force SC	1
B2	Renown SC	0

=== Quarter-finals ===
30 November 2013

Ratnam SC	1–1 (a.e.t.)	Solid SC
Penalties
	3–4

Kalutara Stadium, Kalutara

1 December 2013

Air Force SC	2–1	Army SC

Kalutara Stadium, Kalutara

7 December 2013

Blue Star SC	0–1	Renown SC

Sugathadasa Stadium, Colombo

8 December 2013

Colombo FC	2–3	Don Bosco SC

Kalutara Stadium, Kalutara

=== Semi-finals ===
14 December 2013

Solid SC	1–2	Air Force SC

Bogambara Stadium, Kandy

15 December 2013

Renown SC	2–0	Don Bosco SC

Bogambara Stadium, Kandy

=== Final ===
22 December 2013

Air Force SC	1–0	Renown SC

Kalutara Stadium, Kalutara
