= 2009 SAFF Championship squads =

Football tournament squads

The 2009 SAFF Championship was an international football tournament held in Bangladesh from 4 to 13 December 2009. The 8 national teams involved in the tournament were required to register a squad of 20 players. The position listed for each player is per the squad list in the official match reports by the SAFF.

== Group A ==
=== Maldives ===
Coach: (Hungary) István Urbányi

No.	Pos.	Player	Date of birth (age)	Caps	Goals	Club
	GK	Mohamed Imran	25 May 1988 (aged 21)	41	0	(Football Association of Maldives) Club Valencia
	DF	Mohamed Jameel	4 October 1975 (aged 34)	41	1	(Football Association of Maldives) Club Valencia
	DF	Akram Abdul Ghanee	19 March 1987 (aged 22)	8	0	(Football Association of Maldives) New Radiant
	DF	Sabah Mohamed	18 April 1980 (aged 29)	27	0	(Football Association of Maldives) Victory
	DF	Ahmed Ashfan	18 June 1984 (aged 25)	4	0	(Football Association of Maldives) VB Addu
	MF	Ibrahim Fazeel	9 October 1980 (aged 29)	42	15	(Football Association of Maldives) Victory
	MF	Mohamed Umair	3 July 1988 (aged 21)	4	1	(Football Association of Maldives) Victory
	MF	Shamveel Qasim	20 June 1982 (aged 27)	15	2	(Football Association of Maldives) New Radiant
	MF	Mohamed Shifan	8 March 1983 (aged 26)	11	1	(Football Association of Maldives) Victory
	MF	Mohamed "Bakka" Arif	11 August 1985 (aged 24)	6	0	(Football Association of Maldives) New Radiant
	MF	Mohamed Hussain	12 October 1979 (aged 30)	17	0	(Football Association of Maldives) VB Addu
	MF	Ashad "Adey" Ali	14 September 1986 (aged 23)	6	0	(Football Association of Maldives) Victory
	FW	Ahmed Thoriq	4 October 1980 (aged 29)	21	7	(Football Association of Maldives) New Radiant
	FW	Ali Ashfaq	6 September 1985 (aged 24)	24	14	(Football Association of Maldives) VB Addu
	FW	Ahmed Rasheed	8 July 1988 (aged 21)	1	0	(Football Association of Maldives) Maziya
	FW	Mukhuthar Naseer	7 May 1979 (aged 30)	10	2	(Football Association of Maldives) Victory

=== India U23 ===
Coach: (India) Sukhwinder Singh

No.	Pos.	Player	Date of birth (age)	Caps	Goals	Club
	GK	Arindam Bhattacharya	11 December 1989 (aged 19)			(All India Football Federation) Churchill Brothers
	GK	Laxmikant Kattimani	3 May 1989 (aged 20)			(All India Football Federation) Dempo
	DF	Denzil Franco	30 June 1985 (aged 24)			(All India Football Federation) Mahindra United
	DF	Dharmaraj Ravanan	29 July 1987 (aged 22)			(All India Football Federation) Mahindra United
	DF	Nirmal Chettri	21 October 1990 (aged 19)			(All India Football Federation) East Bengal
	DF	Naoba Singh	1 March 1988 (aged 21)			(All India Football Federation) Churchill Brothers
	DF	Rowilson Rodrigues	26 March 1987 (aged 22)			(All India Football Federation) Churchill Brothers
	DF	Robert Lalthlamuana	4 September 1988 (aged 21)			(All India Football Federation) Churchill Brothers
	DF	Ravinder Singh	17 December 1991 (aged 17)			(All India Football Federation) Air India
	MF	Jagpreet Singh	6 September 1988 (aged 21)			(All India Football Federation) JCT
	MF	Baldip Singh	6 February 1987 (aged 22)			(All India Football Federation) JCT
	MF	Manish Maithani	1 April 1989 (aged 20)			(All India Football Federation) Mohun Bagan
	MF	Jibon Singh	6 February 1990 (aged 19)			(All India Football Federation) East Bengal
	MF	Jewel Raja	19 January 1990 (aged 19)			(All India Football Federation) Dempo
	FW	Joaquim Abranches	28 October 1985 (aged 24)			(All India Football Federation) Dempo
	FW	Balwant Singh	15 December 1986 (aged 22)			(All India Football Federation) JCT
	FW	Sushil Kumar Singh	1 April 1981 (aged 28)			(All India Football Federation) Mahindra United
	FW	Jagtar Singh	15 March 1990 (aged 19)			(All India Football Federation) Tata Football Academy
	FW	Jeje Lalpekhlua	7 January 1991 (aged 18)			(All India Football Federation) Pune

=== Nepal ===
Coach: (Nepal) Krishna Thapa

No.	Pos.	Player	Date of birth (age)	Caps	Goals	Club
	GK	Bikash Malla	15 August 1986 (aged 23)	17	0	(All Nepal Football Association) Tribhuvan Army
	GK	Rupak Shrestha	1 January 1988 (aged 21)	0	0	(All Nepal Football Association) Friends Club
	DF	Sagar Thapa	21 November 1985 (aged 24)	23	0	(All Nepal Football Association) New Road Team
	DF	Anjan KC	14 December 1986 (aged 22)	18	1	(All Nepal Football Association) Three Star Club
	DF	Biraj Maharjan	18 September 1990 (aged 19)	13	1	(All Nepal Football Association) New Road Team
	DF	Sandeep Rai	14 April 1989 (aged 20)	14	2	(All Nepal Football Association) Manang Marshyangdi
	DF	Rohit Chand	1 March 1992 (aged 17)	3	0	(All Nepal Football Association) Machhindra
	DF	Rabin Shrestha	17 May 1991 (aged 18)	1	0	(All Nepal Football Association) Mahendra Police
	DF	Rakesh Shrestha	14 January 1977 (aged 32)	47	0	(All Nepal Football Association) Mahendra Police
	MF	Bijay Gurung	11 October 1985 (aged 24)	23	3	(All Nepal Football Association) Three Star Club
	MF	Raju Tamang	27 October 1985 (aged 24)	17	1	(All Nepal Football Association) Tribhuvan Army
	MF	Chetan Ghimire	27 December 1990 (aged 18)	3	0	(All Nepal Football Association) Mahendra Police
	MF	Yogesh Shrestha	10 October 1989 (aged 20)	2	0	(All Nepal Football Association) Mahendra Police
	MF	Nirajan Khadka	6 October 1988 (aged 21)	12	0	(All Nepal Football Association) Manang Marshyangdi
	FW	Ju Manu Rai	1 March 1983 (aged 26)	19	6	(Football Association of Maldives) AYL
	FW	Anil Gurung	23 September 1988 (aged 21)	10	3	(All India Football Federation) Shillong Lajong
	FW	Santosh Sahukhala	10 January 1988 (aged 21)	9	1	(Bangladesh Football Federation) Chittagong Abahani Limited

=== Afghanistan ===
Coach: (Afghanistan) Mohammad Yousef Kargar

No.	Pos.	Player	Date of birth (age)	Caps	Goals	Club
	GK	Hamidullah Yousufzai	9 October 1981 (aged 28)	0	0	(Afghanistan Football Federation) Kabul Bank
	DF	Zohib Islam Amiri	2 May 1987 (aged 22)	11	0	(Afghanistan Football Federation) Kabul Bank
	DF	Ali Ahmad Yarzada	15 October 1985 (aged 24)	11	0	(Afghanistan Football Federation) Kabul Bank
	DF	Zakria Rezai	29 July 1989 (aged 20)	0	0	(Afghanistan Football Federation) Ordu Kabul
	DF	Ali Azara		0	0	(Afghanistan Football Federation) Kabul Bank
	DF	Faisal Sakhizada	15 July 1990 (aged 19)	3	0	(Afghanistan Football Federation) Ordu Kabul
	DF	Muqadar Qazizadah	11 September 1988 (aged 21)	1	0	(Afghanistan Football Federation) Kabul Bank
	MF	Sayed Maqsood Hashimi	5 March 1986 (aged 23)	11	2	(Afghanistan Football Federation) Ordu Kabul
	MF	Sayed Bashir Azimi	27 May 1984 (aged 25)	8	1	(Afghanistan Football Federation) Kam Air
	MF	Israfeel Kohistani	5 June 1987 (aged 22)	9	0	(Afghanistan Football Federation) Kabul Bank
	MF	Saboor Khalili	5 September 1985 (aged 24)	0	0	(German Football Association) SV Curslack-Neuengamme
	MF	Ahmad Khesraw	6 February 1982 (aged 27)	2	0	(Afghanistan Football Federation) Kabul Bank
	MF	Waheed Nadeem	1 January 1980 (aged 29)	1	0	(Afghanistan Football Federation) Kabul Bank
	MF	Mustafa Hadid	25 August 1988 (aged 21)	2	1	(German Football Association) FC Altona 93
	MF	Zomhan Habibi	1 July 1990 (aged 19)	0	0	(German Football Association) Hammer SpVg
	FW	Hashmatullah Barakzai	4 June 1987 (aged 22)	6	1	(Afghanistan Football Federation) Kabul Bank
	FW	Hafizullah Qadami	20 February 1985 (aged 24)	11	3	(Afghanistan Football Federation) Kabul Bank

== Group B ==
=== Bangladesh ===
Coach: (Bangladesh) Shahidur Rahman Shantoo

No.	Pos.	Player	Date of birth (age)	Caps	Goals	Club
	GK	Aminul Haque	10 October 1980 (aged 29)	48	0	(Bangladesh Football Federation) Mohammedan
	GK	Biplob Bhattacharjee	7 January 1981 (aged 28)	23	0	(Bangladesh Football Federation) Abahani Limited Dhaka
	GK	Mazharul Islam Himel	16 September 1988 (aged 21)	1	0	(Bangladesh Football Federation) Sheikh Russel
	DF	Rajani Kanta Barman	12 May 1976 (aged 33)	63	0	(Bangladesh Football Federation) Muktijoddha Sangsad
	DF	Waly Faisal	1 March 1985 (aged 24)	21	0	(Bangladesh Football Federation) Mohammedan
	DF	Mohammed Ariful Islam	20 December 1987 (aged 21)	13	0	(Bangladesh Football Federation) Mohammedan
	DF	Nasirul Islam Nasir	5 October 1988 (aged 21)	2	0	(Bangladesh Football Federation) Mohammedan
	DF	Atiqur Rahman Meshu	26 August 1988 (aged 21)	5	0	(Bangladesh Football Federation) Abahani Limited Dhaka
	DF	Mamun Miah	11 September 1987 (aged 22)	3	0	(Bangladesh Football Federation) Mohammedan
	DF	Mohiuddin Ibnul Siraji	25 July 1985 (aged 24)	4	0	(Bangladesh Football Federation) Abahani Limited Dhaka
	MF	Mehedi Hasan Ujjal	26 April 1985 (aged 24)	24	0	(Bangladesh Football Federation) Abahani Limited Dhaka
	MF	Mamunul Islam	12 December 1988 (aged 20)	10	2	(Bangladesh Football Federation) Mohammedan
	MF	Pranotosh Kumar Das	1 July 1982 (aged 27)	0	0	(Bangladesh Football Federation) Abahani Limited Dhaka
	MF	Arman Aziz	10 May 1984 (aged 25)	29	0	(Bangladesh Football Federation) Mohammedan
	MF	Shahedul Alam Shahed	12 February 1991 (aged 18)	1	0	(Bangladesh Football Federation) Abahani Limited Dhaka
	FW	Enamul Haque	1 November 1985 (aged 24)	3	2	(Bangladesh Football Federation) Abahani Limited Dhaka
	FW	Zahid Hasan Ameli	25 December 1987 (aged 21)	32	6	(Bangladesh Football Federation) Mohammedan
	FW	Zahid Parvez Chowdhury	29 December 1987 (aged 21)	12	0	(Bangladesh Football Federation) Abahani Limited Dhaka
	FW	Mithun Chowdhury	10 February 1989 (aged 20)	1	0	(Bangladesh Football Federation) Chittagong Abahani Limited
	FW	Abdul Baten Komol	2 August 1987 (aged 22)	4	0	(Bangladesh Football Federation) Mohammedan
	FW	Mohamed Zahid Hossain	15 June 1988 (aged 21)	17	2	(Bangladesh Football Federation) Mohammedan

=== Pakistan ===
Coach: (Austria) György Kottán

No.	Pos.	Player	Date of birth (age)	Caps	Goals	Club
	GK	Jaffar Khan	10 March 1981 (aged 28)	34	0	(Pakistan Football Federation) Pakistan Army
	GK	Amir Gul Chhutto	15 November 1986 (aged 23)	4	0	(Pakistan Football Federation) NBP
	DF	Muhammad Shahid	10 October 1985 (aged 24)	16	0	(Pakistan Football Federation) WAPDA
	DF	Amjad Iqbal	2 May 1981 (aged 28)	2	0	(The Football Association) Bradford Park Avenue
	DF	Atif Bashir	3 April 1985 (aged 24)	6	1	(Football Association of Wales) Bridgend Town
	DF	Shabir Khan	10 November 1985 (aged 24)	1	0	(The Football Association) Worcester City
	DF	Samar Ishaq	1 January 1986 (aged 23)	24	1	(Pakistan Football Federation) KRL
	DF	Zesh Rehman	14 October 1983 (aged 26)	6	0	(The Football Association) Bradford City
	DF	Haji Muhammad	16 October 1989 (aged 20)	1	0	(Pakistan Football Federation) PIA
	MF	Abdul Aziz	11 January 1986 (aged 23)	23	0	(Pakistan Football Federation) NBP
	MF	Adnan Ahmed	7 June 1984 (aged 25)	11	4	(Hungarian Football Federation) Ferencváros
	MF	Mehmood Ali		0	0	(Pakistan Football Federation) WAPDA
	MF	Jadid Khan Pathan	1 June 1989 (aged 20)	10	1	(Pakistan Football Federation) Afghan
	MF	Nasrullah Khan	1 March 1985 (aged 24)	8	0	(Pakistan Football Federation) PIA
	MF	Aurangzeb Baloch	23 February 1991 (aged 18)	0	0	(Pakistan Football Federation) K-Electric
	FW	Muhammad Essa	20 November 1983 (aged 26)	37	9	(Pakistan Football Federation) KRL
	FW	Arif Mehmood	21 June 1983 (aged 26)	13	2	(Pakistan Football Federation) WAPDA
	FW	Safiullah Khan	13 March 1979 (aged 30)	10	5	(Pakistan Football Federation) KRL
	FW	Reis Ashraf	18 September 1989 (aged 20)	0	0	(The Football Association) Leamington
	FW	Khuda Bakhsh	15 June 1980 (aged 29)	4	0	(Pakistan Football Federation) WAPDA
	FW	Mudassar Saeed	3 July 1981 (aged 28)	3	0	(Pakistan Football Federation) KRL

=== Bhutan ===
Coach: (Japan) Koji Gyotoku

No.	Pos.	Player	Date of birth (age)	Caps	Goals	Club
	GK	Leki Dukpa	9 December 1989 (aged 19)	0	0	(Bhutan Football Federation)
	GK	Tenzin	20 August 1990 (aged 19)	0	0	(Bhutan Football Federation)
	GK	Tshering Dendup	4 April 1994 (aged 15)	0	0	(Bhutan Football Federation)
	DF	Pema Dorji	5 July 1985 (aged 24)	27	0	(Bhutan Football Federation) Yeedzin
	DF	Kinley Wangchuk	1 March 1984 (aged 25)	2	0	(Bhutan Football Federation) Yeedzin
	DF	Sangay Khandu	8 February 1985 (aged 24)	19	0	(Bhutan Football Federation) Transport United
	DF	Dawa Gyeltshen	17 July 1992 (aged 17)	0	0	(Bhutan Football Federation) Yeedzin
	DF	Tandin Tshering	1 January 1983 (aged 26)	7	0	(Bhutan Football Federation) Drukpol
	DF	Karun Gurung	9 June 1986 (aged 23)	3	0	(Bhutan Football Federation) Druk Stars
	DF	Chencho Nio	3 March 1986 (aged 23)	19	0	(Bhutan Football Federation) Yeedzin
	DF	Kelzang Dorji	7 July 1990 (aged 19)	1	0	(Bhutan Football Federation) Tensung
	MF	Passang Tshering	16 July 1983 (aged 26)	27	3	(Bhutan Football Federation) Druk Stars
	MF	Sonam Tenzin	20 October 1986 (aged 23)	7	0	(All India Football Federation) Buddhist Blue Stars
	MF	Nawang Dhendup	20 October 1984 (aged 25)	20	1	(Bhutan Football Federation) Druk Stars
	MF	Chimi Dorji	22 December 1993 (aged 15)	4	0	(Bhutan Football Federation) Druk Stars
	MF	Kinley Dorji	30 August 1986 (aged 23)	26	1	(Bhutan Football Federation) Druk Stars
	MF	Gyeltshen Gyeltshen	7 June 1986 (aged 23)	11	2	(Bhutan Football Federation) Transport United
	MF	Pema Chophel	6 August 1981 (aged 28)	12	1	(Bhutan Football Federation) Yeedzin
	FW	Kinga Thinley	2 February 1990 (aged 19)	0	0	(Bhutan Football Federation) Ugyen Academy

=== Sri Lanka ===
Coach: (Sri Lanka) Sampath Perera

No.	Pos.	Player	Date of birth (age)	Caps	Goals	Club
	GK	Yelandran Sadhishkumar		0	0	(Football Federation of Sri Lanka)
	GK	Ajith Kumara Herath	1 July 1985 (aged 24)	8	0	(Football Federation of Sri Lanka) Sri Lanka Navy
	DF	Dudley Lincoln Steinwall	9 November 1974 (aged 35)	44	4	(Football Federation of Sri Lanka) Negombo Youth
	DF	Rajitha Jayawilal Acharige	22 July 1979 (aged 30)	12	0	(Football Federation of Sri Lanka) Sri Lanka Police
	DF	Arachchige Pradeep Kumara	8 August 1982 (aged 27)	16	2	(Football Federation of Sri Lanka) Sri Lanka Police
	DF	Duminda Wasantha Hettiarachichi	9 May 1983 (aged 26)	12	0	(Football Federation of Sri Lanka) Saunders
	DF	Bandara Warakagoda	13 October 1986 (aged 23)	4	0	(Football Federation of Sri Lanka) Renown
	DF	Well Ruwanthilaka	27 September 1984 (aged 25)	21	3	(Football Federation of Sri Lanka) Saunders
	DF	Thilina Suranda	16 August 1985 (aged 24)	10	0	(Football Federation of Sri Lanka) Don Bosco
	DF	Asanka Rangana Arachchige	22 November 1980 (aged 29)	7	0	(Football Federation of Sri Lanka) Ratnam
	MF	Chathura Maduranga Weerasinghe	28 January 1981 (aged 28)	47	7	(Football Federation of Sri Lanka) Ratnam
	MF	Asmeer Lathif Mohamed	3 May 1983 (aged 26)	30	1	(Football Federation of Sri Lanka) Blue Star
	MF	Chathura Gunaratne	8 September 1982 (aged 27)	22	2	(Football Federation of Sri Lanka) Don Bosco
	MF	Shanmugarajah Sanjeev	8 September 1982 (aged 27)	3	1	(Football Federation of Sri Lanka) Sri Lanka Air Force
	MF	Mohamed Izzadeen	17 January 1981 (aged 28)	19	5	(Football Federation of Sri Lanka) Renown
	MF	Kumara Lankesara	11 October 1986 (aged 23)	0	0	(Football Federation of Sri Lanka) Sri Lanka Air Force
	MF	Sanoj Sameera	3 September 1989 (aged 20)	2	0	(Football Federation of Sri Lanka) Saunders
	MF	Sembukutti Silva		0	0	(Football Federation of Sri Lanka)
	FW	Channa Ediri Bandanage	22 September 1978 (aged 31)	63	13	(Football Association of Maldives) Maziya
	FW	Kasun Jayasuriya	25 March 1980 (aged 29)	54	22	(Football Federation of Sri Lanka) Ratnam
	FW	Nipuna Bandara	17 June 1991 (aged 18)	0	0	(Football Federation of Sri Lanka) Don Bosco

- Wellala Hettige Gunaratne
- Kolitha Chathuranga Kumara
