= 2015 Sri Lanka Football Premier League =

Sri Lanka Football Premier League
- Season: 2015
- Champions: Colombo
- Matches: 85
- Goals: 192 (2.26 per match)
- Top goalscorer: M.C.M. Rifnaz (9 Goals)

2015 Sri Lanka Football Premier League (also known as 2015 Dialog Champions League for sponsorship reasons) was the 31st season of Sri Lanka Football Premier League. Solid SC of Anuradhapura were the defending champions.

The 2015 season was different from the previous season. In this season, 22 teams competed in two groups of 11 teams. Top 4 teams from each groups qualified for the Super 8 round. The teams competed with one another in round-robin format. The team with the best record at the end of the Super 8 was to become the champion.

The defending champions in the previous tournament Solid SC was eliminated in the first round. Colombo FC emerged champions of the Dialog Champions League 2015 by a solitary goal difference with Renown SC.

The champions qualified for the preliminary round of AFC Cup.

== League table ==
=== Group A ===
| Pos | Team | Pld | W | D | L | GF | GA | GD | Pts | Qualification or relegation |
|---|---|---|---|---|---|---|---|---|---|---|
| 1 | Army SC (Q) | 10 | 8 | 1 | 1 | 26 | 5 | +21 | 25 | Championship Round |
| 2 | Air Force SC (Q) | 10 | 6 | 3 | 1 | 14 | 7 | +7 | 21 | Championship Round |
| 3 | Crystal Palace SC (Q) | 10 | 5 | 4 | 1 | 26 | 14 | +12 | 19 | Championship Round |
| 4 | Renown SC (Q) | 10 | 5 | 3 | 2 | 17 | 12 | +5 | 18 | Championship Round |
| 5 | Solid SC | 10 | 4 | 3 | 3 | 21 | 15 | +6 | 15 | |
| 6 | Saunders SC | 10 | 4 | 3 | 3 | 16 | 10 | +6 | 15 | |
| 7 | Nandimithra SC | 10 | 4 | 1 | 5 | 8 | 16 | −8 | 13 | |
| 8 | Police SC | 10 | 3 | 2 | 5 | 16 | 18 | −2 | 11 | |
| 9 | Up Country Lions SC | 10 | 1 | 4 | 5 | 6 | 12 | −6 | 7 | |
| 10 | Pelicans SC (R) | 10 | 2 | 1 | 7 | 13 | 28 | −15 | 7 | Relegated |
| 11 | Highlanders SC (R) | 10 | 0 | 1 | 9 | 3 | 29 | −26 | 1 | Relegated |

Source: Soccerway
(Q) Qualified for the phase indicated; (R) Relegated

=== Group B ===
| Pos | Team | Pld | W | D | L | GF | GA | GD | Pts | Qualification or relegation |
|---|---|---|---|---|---|---|---|---|---|---|
| 1 | Colombo FC (Q) | 9 | 7 | 2 | 0 | 27 | 5 | +22 | 23 | Championship Round |
| 2 | Blue Star SC (Q) | 9 | 5 | 2 | 2 | 18 | 3 | +15 | 17 | Championship Round |
| 3 | Java Lane SC (Q) | 9 | 5 | 2 | 2 | 10 | 6 | +4 | 17 | Championship Round |
| 4 | Navy SC (Q) | 9 | 5 | 1 | 3 | 15 | 10 | +5 | 16 | Championship Round |
| 5 | New Young SC | 9 | 4 | 3 | 2 | 13 | 11 | +2 | 15 | |
| 6 | Negombo Youth SC | 9 | 4 | 1 | 4 | 16 | 20 | −4 | 13 | |
| 7 | Super Son SC | 9 | 3 | 2 | 4 | 13 | 12 | +1 | 11 | |
| 8 | Matara City SC | 9 | 3 | 0 | 6 | 11 | 17 | −6 | 9 | |
| 9 | Thihariya Youth SC | 9 | 1 | 2 | 6 | 7 | 22 | −15 | 5 | |
| 10 | Kalutara Park SC (R) | 9 | 0 | 1 | 8 | 2 | 26 | −24 | 1 | Relegated |
| 11 | Don Bosco SC (Note: Disqualified for using ineligible players.) (D) | 4 | 2 | 0 | 2 | 3 | 4 | −1 | 6 | Disqualified |

Source: Soccerway
(D) Disqualified; (Q) Qualified for the phase indicated; (R) Relegated

=== Fixtures and Results ===
==== Stage 1 ====
31 October 2015
15:00

| Air Force SC | 1-4 | Colombo FC |

Sugathadasa Stadium, Colombo
31 October 2015
17:30

| Renown SC | 4-0 | Java Lane SC |

Sugathadasa Stadium, Colombo
1 November 2015
15:00

| Crystal Palace SC | 2-2 | Navy SC |

Sugathadasa Stadium, Colombo
1 November 2015
17:30

| Army SC | 3-2 | Blue Star SC |

Sugathadasa Stadium, Colombo

== Championship Round ==
| Pos | Team | Pld | W | D | L | GF | GA | GD | Pts | Qualification |
|---|---|---|---|---|---|---|---|---|---|---|
| 1 | Colombo (Note: Colombo: 3 bonus points given based on final position in first stage (Group B)) (C) | 7 | 4 | 2 | 1 | 17 | 7 | +10 | 17 | 2016 AFC Cup qualifying round (Note: Sri Lanka were allocated one qualifying round slot, but did not enter a team.) |
| 2 | Renown | 7 | 5 | 2 | 0 | 17 | 8 | +9 | 17 | |
| 3 | Army (Note: Army: 3 bonus points given based on final position in first stage (Group A)) | 7 | 3 | 3 | 1 | 15 | 10 | +5 | 15 | |
| 4 | Air Force (Note: Air Force: 2 bonus points given based on final position in first stage (Group A)) | 7 | 2 | 2 | 3 | 8 | 10 | −2 | 10 | |
| 5 | Crystal Palace (Note: Crystal Palace: 1 bonus points given based on final position in first stage (Group A)) | 7 | 2 | 3 | 2 | 12 | 15 | −3 | 10 | |
| 6 | Navy | 7 | 2 | 3 | 2 | 14 | 16 | −2 | 9 | |
| 7 | Blue Star (Note: Blue Star: 2 bonus points given based on final position in first stage (Group B)) | 7 | 0 | 4 | 3 | 7 | 11 | −4 | 6 | |
| 8 | Java Lane (Note: Java Lane: 1 bonus points given based on final position in first stage (Group B)) | 7 | 0 | 1 | 6 | 4 | 17 | −13 | 2 | |

Source: Soccerway
(C) Champions

== Awards ==
The winners of the competition were given a cash award of Rs. 750000 while the runners-up received Rs. 500000.
Individual awards:

| Award | Player | Club |
|---|---|---|
| Golden Boot | Dhanushka Wijesiri | Army SC |
| Top goal scorer | M.C.M. Rifnaz | Renown SC |
| Best Goalkeeper | M.N.M. Imran | Colombo FC |
