= 2016–17 Sri Lanka Football Premier League =

Sri Lanka Football Premier League
- Season: 2016–17
- Champions: Colombo
- Relegated: Division I
- Matches played: 100
- Goals scored: 331 (3.31 per match)
- Top goalscorer: Job Michael and M.N.M. Izzadeen
- Biggest home win: Negombo 8-0 Country Lions (6 August 2016)
- Biggest away win: Thihariya 1-9 Renown (23 July 2016)

2016–17 was the 32nd season of Sri Lanka Football Premier League.

The defending champions Colombo Football Club regained the title for the second time by defeating Renown SC 3–1 in the championship round.

== Teams Allocation ==
If this season is playing according to the previous season. The competition was played with 18 teams. The teams were divided into two groups of nine. The teams played round robin matches and the four group best teams of each group qualified for the Final Stage. In that stage all the eight teams will play round robin matches and the team that take first place in the group will be the Champions.Pelicans SC, Highlanders SC, Kalutara Park SC and Don Bosco were relegated in the previous tournament.

== Clubs ==
Locations of major football grounds in Sri Lanka

| Club Name | Location | Stadium | Capacity |
|---|---|---|---|
| Air Force Sports Club | Ekala | Ekala Football Ground | 1,000 |
| Blue Star SC | Kalutara | Kalutara Stadium | 15,000 |
| Civil Security Force SC | Colombo | City Football Complex | 1,000 |
| Colombo FC | Colombo | Sugathadasa Stadium | 28,000 |
| Crystal Palace SC | Gampola | Jayathilake Stadium | 5,000 |
| Java Lane SC | Colombo | City Football Complex | 1,000 |
| Matara City SC | Matara | Matara Football Complex | 2,000 |
| Negambo Youth | Negombo | Maristella Ground | 1,000 |
| New Young's SC | Wennappuwa | Sir Albert F. Peiries Stadium | 5,000 |
| Renown Sports Club | Colombo | CR & FC Grounds | 2,500 |
| Saunders SC | Colombo | Kelaniya Football Complex | 1,000 |
| SL Navy SC | Welisara | Navy Ground | 1,000 |
| Solid SC | Anuradhapura | Prison Ground | 2,000 |
| Sri Lanka Army SC | Homagama | Homagama Ground | 5,000 |
| Sri Lanka Police SC | Colombo | Police Ground | 1,000 |
| Super Sun SC | Dharga Town | Zahira College Ground | 1,000 |
| Thihariya Youth SC | Gampaha | Sugathadasa Stadium | 28,000 |
| Up Country Lions SC | Nawalapitiya | Jayathilake Stadium | 5,000 |

== League table ==
=== Group A ===
| Pos | Team | Pld | W | D | L | GF | GA | GD | Pts | Qualification or relegation |
|---|---|---|---|---|---|---|---|---|---|---|
| 1 | Army S.C. | 8 | 7 | 1 | 0 | 24 | 4 | +20 | 22 | Championship Round |
| 2 | Solid S.C. | 8 | 4 | 3 | 1 | 17 | 6 | +11 | 15 | Championship Round |
| 3 | Colombo F.C. | 8 | 5 | 0 | 3 | 17 | 9 | +8 | 15 | Championship Round |
| 4 | Blue Star | 8 | 4 | 1 | 3 | 11 | 13 | −2 | 13 | Championship Round |
| 5 | Negombo Youth | 8 | 4 | 0 | 4 | 26 | 13 | +13 | 12 | |
| 6 | Crystal Palace SC | 8 | 3 | 1 | 4 | 17 | 19 | −2 | 10 | |
| 7 | Country Lions | 8 | 2 | 3 | 3 | 8 | 16 | −8 | 9 | |
| 8 | Matara City | 8 | 2 | 1 | 5 | 8 | 17 | −9 | 7 | Division I |
| 9 | Civil Security Force | 8 | 0 | 0 | 8 | 2 | 33 | −31 | 0 | Division I |

Source: The Papare

=== Group B ===
| Pos | Team | Pld | W | D | L | GF | GA | GD | Pts | Qualification or relegation |
|---|---|---|---|---|---|---|---|---|---|---|
| 1 | Renown S.C. | 8 | 7 | 0 | 1 | 26 | 7 | +19 | 21 | Championship Round |
| 2 | New Young | 8 | 5 | 1 | 2 | 15 | 11 | +4 | 16 | Championship Round |
| 3 | Navy S.C. | 8 | 4 | 2 | 2 | 12 | 10 | +2 | 14 | Championship Round |
| 4 | Air Force | 8 | 4 | 1 | 3 | 12 | 7 | +5 | 13 | Championship Round |
| 5 | Super Sun | 8 | 4 | 0 | 4 | 12 | 11 | +1 | 12 | |
| 6 | Saunders SC | 8 | 3 | 1 | 4 | 12 | 12 | 0 | 10 | |
| 7 | Police S.C. | 8 | 2 | 2 | 4 | 10 | 17 | −7 | 8 | |
| 8 | Java Lane | 8 | 1 | 3 | 4 | 10 | 13 | −3 | 6 | Division I |
| 9 | Thihariya Youth | 8 | 0 | 2 | 6 | 4 | 25 | −21 | 2 | Division I |

Source: The Papare

== Result table ==
=== Group A ===
| Home \ Away | ARM | SOL | CFC | NEG | BST | LSC | CRY | MAN | CSS |
|---|---|---|---|---|---|---|---|---|---|
| Army | | | | 2–1 | 6–0 | | 3–2 | | 6–0 |
| Solid | 0–0 | | 4–2 | | | | 3–0 | | 6–0 |
| Colombo | 0–2 | | | 4–0 | | 1–0 | 3–2 | | |
| Negombo | | 0–2 | | | 2–3 | 8–0 | | 4–2 | |
| Blue Star | | 2–0 | 1–0 | | | | | 0–1 | 2–0 |
| Country Lions | 0–2 | 1–1 | | | 2–2 | | 2–2 | | |
| Crystal Palace | | | | 0–4 | 2–1 | | | 4–1 | 5–2 |
| Matara City | 1–3 | 1–1 | 0–4 | | | 0–1 | | | |
| Civil Security | | | 0–3 | 0–7 | | 0–2 | | 0–2 | |

Updated to match(es) played on 8 September 2016. Source: Papare
Legend: Blue = home team win; Yellow = draw; Red = away team win.

=== Group B ===
| Home \ Away | RSC | AIR | YSC | NSC | SAU | SSC | JAV | POL | THI |
|---|---|---|---|---|---|---|---|---|---|
| Renown | | 1–0 | | | | 3–1 | 1–0 | 6–2 | |
| Air Force | | | 2–1 | | 2–0 | 0–1 | | | 3–0 |
| New Young | 0–3 | | | 3–1 | 2–1 | | | | 2–0 |
| Navy | 2–1 | 1–4 | | | | | 1–1 | | 1–0 |
| Saunders | 1–2 | | | 1–1 | | 3–2 | 4–2 | | |
| Super Sun | | | 2–3 | 0–3 | | | | 0–0 | 3–0 |
| Java Lane | | 2–0 | 1–1 | | | 1–2 | | 2–3 | |
| Police | | 1–1 | 1–3 | 0–2 | 0–1 | | | | |
| Thihariya | 1–9 | | | | 0–4 | | 1–1 | 2–2 | |

Updated to match(es) played on 8 September 2016. Source: Papare
Legend: Blue = home team win; Yellow = draw; Red = away team win.

== Championship Round ==
| Pos | Team | Pld | W | D | L | GF | GA | GD | Pts | Qualification |
|---|---|---|---|---|---|---|---|---|---|---|
| 1 | Colombo | 7 | 5 | 1 | 1 | 13 | 5 | +8 | 16 | 2018 AFC Cup |
| 2 | Renown | 7 | 5 | 0 | 2 | 14 | 7 | +7 | 15 | |
| 3 | Blue Star | 7 | 4 | 2 | 1 | 11 | 9 | +2 | 14 | |
| 4 | Army | 7 | 4 | 1 | 2 | 25 | 9 | +16 | 13 | |
| 5 | New Young | 7 | 2 | 2 | 3 | 7 | 10 | −3 | 8 | |
| 6 | Air Force | 7 | 1 | 2 | 4 | 6 | 8 | −2 | 5 | |
| 7 | Navy | 7 | 1 | 1 | 5 | 8 | 19 | −11 | 4 | |
| 8 | Solid | 7 | 1 | 1 | 5 | 6 | 20 | −14 | 4 | |

Source: Papare

=== Result table ===
| Home \ Away | RSC | AIR | YSC | NSC | ARM | SOL | CFC | BST |
|---|---|---|---|---|---|---|---|---|
| Renown | | 2–0 | 2–1 | | 3–0 | | 1–3 | 0–2 |
| Air Force | | | | | 2–2 | 3–0 | 1–2 | |
| New Young | | 1–0 | | 4–1 | | 1–1 | 0–0 | 0–1 |
| Navy | 1–2 | 1–0 | | | | 0–5 | | |
| Army | | | 5–0 | 3–2 | | | | 7–3 |
| Solid | 0–4 | | | | 0–7 | | | 0–2 |
| Colombo | | | | 3–1 | 2–1 | 3–0 | | |
| Blue Star | | 0–0 | | 2–2 | | | 1–0 | |

Source: Papare
Legend: Blue = home team win; Yellow = draw; Red = away team win.

== Awards ==
The winners of the competition were given a cash award of Rs. 700000.

| Award | Player | Club |
|---|---|---|
| Most Valuable Player | Afis Oleymi | Colombo |
| Top goal scorer | Job Michael and M.N.M. Izzadeen | Renown SC & Army |
| Best Goalkeeper | M.N.M. Imran | Colombo FC |

== Controversies ==
- This edition of the league was highly criticized by the clubs due to the poor management of the tournament. This has occurred in the Super 8 Stage when the Round has to postponed in number of occasions. Many clubs have make their dissatisfaction in this incident.
- The fixtures of Championship Round was again postponed to mid of January due to the monsoon rain.
