= 2018–19 Sri Lanka Champions League =

Sri Lanka Champions League
- Season: 2018–19
- Champions: Defenders
- Relegated: Crystal Palace; Negombo Youth; Super Sun
- AFC Cup: Defenders

The 2018–19 Sri Lanka Champions League, known as the 2018–19 Dialog Champions League due to sponsorship reasons, was the 34th season of the Sri Lanka Champions League, the top-tier football league in Sri Lanka. The season started on 21 October 2018, rather than the original scheduled date of June, due to the 2018 SAFF Championship, and ended on 24 February 2019.

== Teams ==
A total of 18 teams competed in the league. Colombo were the defending champions, having won the previous three titles. Police and Moragasmulla were relegated at the end of the previous season, and were replaced by promoted teams Red Stars and Ratnam.

Location football club of Sri Lanka Champions League
- Air Force
- Blue Star
- Colombo
- Crystal Palace
- Defenders (renamed from Army SC)
- Java Lane
- Matara City
- Navy Sea Hawks (renamed from Navy SC)
- Negombo Youth
- New Young's
- Pelicans
- Ratnam
- Red Stars
- Renown
- Saunders
- Solid
- Super Sun
- Upcountry Lions

== League table ==
| Pos | Team | Pld | W | D | L | GF | GA | GD | Pts | Qualification or relegation |
|---|---|---|---|---|---|---|---|---|---|---|
| 1 | Defenders (C) | 16 | 10 | 4 | 2 | 35 | 25 | +10 | 34 | Qualification for AFC Cup preliminary round 1 |
| 2 | Colombo | 16 | 9 | 5 | 2 | 40 | 20 | +20 | 32 | |
| 3 | Blue Star | 16 | 10 | 2 | 4 | 23 | 16 | +7 | 32 | |
| 4 | Navy Sea Hawks | 16 | 9 | 3 | 4 | 30 | 19 | +11 | 30 | |
| 5 | Renown | 16 | 8 | 3 | 5 | 29 | 20 | +9 | 27 | |
| 6 | Ratnam | 16 | 8 | 3 | 5 | 23 | 19 | +4 | 27 | |
| 7 | Upcountry Lions | 16 | 8 | 0 | 8 | 30 | 22 | +8 | 24 | |
| 8 | Red Stars | 16 | 6 | 5 | 5 | 31 | 21 | +10 | 23 | |
| 9 | Matara City | 16 | 6 | 5 | 5 | 25 | 24 | +1 | 23 | |
| 10 | Air Force | 16 | 6 | 5 | 5 | 18 | 20 | −2 | 23 | |
| 11 | Solid | 16 | 5 | 3 | 8 | 36 | 34 | +2 | 18 | |
| 12 | New Young's | 16 | 5 | 2 | 9 | 22 | 25 | −3 | 17 | |
| 13 | Java Lane | 16 | 4 | 5 | 7 | 24 | 32 | −8 | 17 | |
| 14 | Pelicans | 16 | 4 | 5 | 7 | 19 | 30 | −11 | 17 | |
| 15 | Saunders | 16 | 4 | 2 | 10 | 22 | 35 | −13 | 14 | |
| 16 | Crystal Palace (R) | 16 | 3 | 4 | 9 | 14 | 31 | −17 | 13 | Relegation to Division I |
| 17 | Negombo Youth (R) | 16 | 1 | 4 | 11 | 18 | 46 | −28 | 7 | Relegation to Division I |
| 18 | Super Sun (D, R) | 0 | 0 | 0 | 0 | 0 | 0 | 0 | 0 | Disqualified; Relegation to Division II (Note: Super Sun were disqualified from the 2018–19 Sri Lanka Champions League, with all their previous results annulled, and demoted to Division II, following their refusal for leaving the field during their match against Renown on 27 January 2019.) |

Source: ThePapare.com
Rules for classification: 1) Points; 2) Goal difference; 3) Goals scored.
(C) Champions; (D) Disqualified; (R) Relegated

== Attendances ==
| # | Football club | Average attendance |
|---|---|---|
| 1 | Colombo FC | 2,387 |
| 2 | Blue Star SC | 2,154 |
| 3 | Defenders FC | 1,974 |
| 4 | Navy Sea Hawks FC | 1,812 |
| 5 | Renown SC | 1,680 |
| 6 | Ratnam SC | 1,503 |
| 7 | Up Country Lions SC | 1,358 |
| 8 | Red Stars SC | 1,282 |
| 9 | Matara City Club | 1,211 |
| 10 | Air Force SC | 1,176 |
| 11 | Solid SC | 1,050 |
| 12 | New Young's FC | 980 |
| 13 | Java Lane SC | 918 |
| 14 | Pelicans SC | 860 |
| 15 | Saunders SC | 824 |
| 16 | Crystal Palace SC | 670 |
| 17 | Negombo Youth SC | 560 |

== See also ==
- 2018 Sri Lanka FA Cup
