= 2011–12 Sri Lanka Football Premier League =

Sri Lanka Football Premier League
- Season: 2011–12

2011–12 Kit Premier League is the 2011–12 season of Kit Premier League.

== Table ==
| Pos | Team | Pld | W | D | L | GF | GA | GD | Pts | Qualification or relegation |
|---|---|---|---|---|---|---|---|---|---|---|
| 1 | Ratnam SC (C) | 22 | 15 | 2 | 5 | 37 | 20 | +17 | 47 | Qualification to 2012 AFC President's Cup |
| 2 | Army SC | 22 | 11 | 9 | 2 | 31 | 15 | +16 | 42 | |
| 3 | Navy SC | 22 | 12 | 5 | 5 | 31 | 12 | +19 | 41 | |
| 4 | Don Bosco SC | 22 | 10 | 7 | 5 | 27 | 20 | +7 | 37 | |
| 5 | Renown SC | 22 | 8 | 7 | 7 | 28 | 25 | +3 | 31 | |
| 6 | Air Force SC | 22 | 7 | 10 | 5 | 24 | 20 | +4 | 31 | |
| 7 | Police SC | 22 | 7 | 9 | 6 | 23 | 21 | +2 | 30 | |
| 8 | Blue Star SC | 22 | 7 | 2 | 13 | 23 | 32 | −9 | 23 | |
| 9 | Saunders SC | 22 | 4 | 10 | 8 | 18 | 21 | −3 | 22 | |
| 10 | New Young SC | 22 | 3 | 8 | 11 | 22 | 42 | −20 | 17 | |
| 11 | Nandimithra SC | 22 | 3 | 8 | 11 | 19 | 44 | −25 | 17 | Relegated to Second Division |
| 12 | Java Lane SC | 22 | 2 | 9 | 11 | 16 | 27 | −11 | 15 | Relegated to Second Division |

(C) Champions
