= 2017–18 Sri Lanka Champions League =

Sri Lanka Champions League
- Season: 2017–18

The 2017–18 Sri Lanka Champions League is the 33rd season of the Sri Lanka Champions League. The season started on 2 September 2017.

== League table ==
Pos	Team	Pld	W	D	L	GF	GA	GD	Pts	Qualification
1	Colombo F.C.	17	12	4	1	46	11	+35	40	2019 AFC Cup preliminary round
2	Renown S.C.	17	12	4	1	44	18	+26	40	
3	New Young	17	9	5	3	33	15	+18	32	
4	Super Sun	17	9	4	4	27	17	+10	31	
5	Pelicans SC	17	8	5	4	24	16	+8	29	
6	Air Force	17	7	7	3	24	14	+10	28	
7	Matara SC	17	7	6	4	28	17	+11	27	
8	Solid S.C.	17	6	5	6	26	18	+8	23	
9	Army S.C.	17	6	4	7	26	17	+9	22	
10	Saunders SC	17	5	7	5	21	23	−2	22	
11	Navy S.C.	17	6	2	9	23	26	−3	20	
12	Up Country Lions SC	17	6	2	9	32	51	−19	20	
13	Blue Star	17	4	6	7	18	27	−9	18	
14	Java Lane	17	4	5	8	19	30	−11	17	
15	Negombo Youth	17	5	2	10	24	41	−17	17	
16	Crystal Palace SC	17	4	4	9	23	39	−16	16	
17	Police S.C.	17	4	1	12	18	41	−23	13	
18	Moragasmulla	17	1	3	13	19	48	−29	6	

Source: FIFA Soccerway
