= 2008 Sri Lanka Football Premier League =

Sri Lanka Football Premier League
- Season: 2008

The following covers the events of the 2008 Sri Lanka Football Premier League.

The 2008 Premier League championship was organized by the Football Federation of Sri Lanka, and by Dialog Telekom. Army SC won the championship after its win over Rathnam SC. Kasun Jayasooriya of Renown SC was the top scorer in the league.

== Teams ==
| Group A | Group B |
|---|---|
| Army SC | Rathnam SC - Kotahena (Colombo) |
| Negambo Youth SC - Negambo | SL Air Force SC |
| Renown SC - Kotahena (Colombo) | Saunders SC - Pettah (Colombo) |
| Blue Stars SC - Kalutara | Jupiter's SC - Negambo |
| New Young's SC - Wennappuwa | Police SC |
| Pelicans SC - Kurunegala | Java Lane SC - Slave Island (Colombo) |

Both Pelicans SC and Java Lane SC were relegated to Division I because they were the last two teams on the table

== Semi-finals ==
- Rathnam SC 4–1 Negambo Youth SC
- SL Air Force SC 0–2 Army SC

== Finals ==
Rathnam SC 1–2 Army SC
