= Sampath Perera =

Sri Lankan football manager

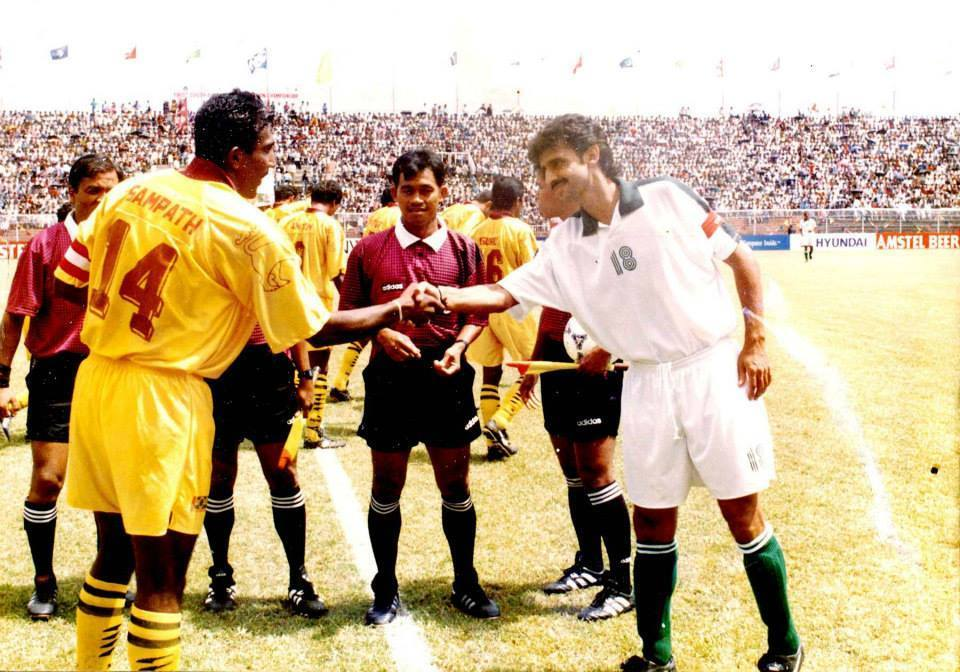
- Perera and Qazi Ashfaq before the Third-place match between Sri Lanka and Pakistan in the 1997 SAFF Gold Cup.

Personal information
- Full name: Kolonnage Mayura Sampath Perera
- Date of birth: 30 October 1965 (age 61)
- Place of birth: Colombo, Sri Lanka
- Height: 1.80 m (5 ft 11 in)
- Position: Center-back

Senior career*
Years	Team	Apps	(Gls)
- Air Force
- York
- Saunders

International career
1989–1997	Sri Lanka		

Managerial career
- 2004–2006: Sri Lanka
- 2008: Ratnam
- 2009: Sri Lanka
- 2010–2011: Don Bosco
- 2011–2013: Sri Lanka
- 2013–2015: Air Force
- 2015–2016: Sri Lanka
- 2016–2017: Air Force
Medal record
Men's football
Representing Sri Lanka (as player)
SAFF Championship
Winner	1995
Representing Sri Lanka (as manager)
AFC Challenge Cup
Runner-up	2006
- * Club domestic league appearances and goals

Kolonnage Mayura Sampath Perera (Tamil: கொலன்னகே மயூர சம்பத் பெரேரா; born 30 October 1965) is a Sri Lankan former football player and coach. He represented the Sri Lanka national team from 1989 to 1997.

== Club career ==
Perera represented Air Force during the majority of his career. He was promoted to the rank of sergeant by the Air Force when Sri Lanka national team won the 1995 SAARC Gold Cup under his leadership. Perera also played for Saunders SC and York SC in the Sri Lanka Bristol League.

== International career ==
Perera represented the Sri Lanka national team from 1989 to 1997, captaining from 1993. He captained Sri Lanka during their 1995 SAARC Gold Cup triumph. Under his captaincy the team also won the silver medal in the 1993 SAARC Gold Cup and the bronze medal in both the 1993 South Asian Games and 1995 South Asian Games.

== Coaching career ==
From 2004 until 2006 Sampath coached the Sri Lanka national team. During which Sri Lanka participated in the 2006 FIFA World Cup qualification – AFC second round, 2005 SAFF Gold Cup and 2006 AFC Challenge Cup. Most notably reaching the final of the AFC Challenge Cup in Bangladesh, where they were defeated by Tajikistan 4–0.

In 2008, he worked with Ratnam SC. In 2009, he again became the head coach of the Sri Lanka and coached the team in the 2009 Nehru Cup. In 2010–11 he trained Don Bosco SC and won them the 2010–11 Sri Lanka Premier League. His third stint as national coach lasted from 2011 to 2013, replacing South Korean coach Jang Jung. During his third stint, Sri Lanka participated in the 2011 SAFF Championship and 2014 AFC Challenge Cup qualification.

In 2013 he led his former club, Air Force SC to the 2013 Premier League title. Perera also coached the team in the 2014 AFC President's Cup. Perera's final stint as national team head coach lasted from 2015 to 2016, coaching Sri Lanka through the 2015 SAFF Championship and 2016 Bangabandhu Cup. He again served as coach of the Air Force from 2016 to 2017.

== Honours ==
=== Player ===
Sri Lanka

- SAFF Championship: 1995

=== Manager ===
Don Bosco

- Sri Lanka Premier League: 2010–11

Air Force

- Sri Lanka Premier League: 2013

Sri Lanka

- AFC Challenge Cup runners-up: 2006
