= 2009 Sri Lanka Football Premier League =

Sri Lanka Football Premier League
- Season: 2009

The 2009 Sri Lanka Football Premier League championship, organized by the Football Federation of Sri Lanka, and was sponsored by Dialog Telekom. Renown SC won the championship by beating SL Air force SC. Mohamed Fazal of Renown SC is the top scorer.

== Teams ==
Group A	Group B
Renown SC - Kotahena (Colombo)	Don Bosco SC - Negambo
Rathnam SC - Kotahena (Colombo)	Blue Stars SC - Kalutara
SL Air force SC	Police SC
Saunders SC - Pettah (Colombo)	Army SC
Jupiter's SC - Negambo	New Young's SC - Wennappuwa
Old Bens SC - Kotahena (Colombo)	Negambo Youth SC - Negambo

== Semi-finals ==
- Renown SC 1-0 Blue Stars SC
- SL Air Force SC 2-1 Don Bosco SC

== Finals ==
Renown SC 2-2[3-1] SL Air Force SC
