= Chathura Gunaratne =

Sri Lankan footballer

Personal information
- Full name: Chathura Gunaratne Wellala Hettige
- Date of birth: 8 September 1982 (age 44)
- Place of birth: Matara, Sri Lanka
- Position: Midfielder

Team information
- Current team: Sri Lanka police S C
- Number: 10

Youth career
- Matara SC: Black Horse SC

Senior career*
Years	Team	Apps	(Gls)
2005-2009	Negombo Youth		(54)
2009-2011	Don Bosco SC		(36)
2011-2013	Renown FC		(11)
2014-2015	Up Country Lions SC		(08)
2015-2016	Super Sun SC		(9)
2016-2017	Pelicans SC		(14)
2017-	SL Police SC		(38)

International career
2006-2014	Sri Lanka	39	(8)
- * Club domestic league appearances and goals

Chathura Gunaratne Wellala Hettige (Sinhala: වෙල්ලාල හෙට්ටිගේ චතුර ගුණරත්න; born 8 September 1982), better known as Chathura Gunaratne, is an association footballer from Sri Lanka. Chathura plays in midfield and has played for eleven clubs in Sri Lanka as well as the Sri Lanka national football team.

== Club career ==
Gunaratne began his career with Negombo Youth in the 2005–06 season. That season, the club won the Kit Premier League, Sri Lanka's top division, topping "Segment A" before defeating Blue Star in the overall final. Gunaratne stayed with Negombo for the 2006–07 season, but they failed to emulate the success of the previous season, finishing in third place in the split league and losing to Blue Star in the overall semi-finals. However, Negombo won the 2007 Holcim FA Cup, defeating Saunders 3-0 in the final. Chathura scored Negombo's second goal.

Despite winning two trophies in two seasons at Negombo Youth, Gunaratne moved on to Ratnam Sports Club, the 2006–07 Kit Premier League champions. His decision proved to be successful, as Ratnam won the league again in 2007–08, defeating Saunders 2-1 in the final. However, the midfielder returned to Negombo Youth ahead of the 2008–09 season. Negombo finished as runners-up of "Segment A" in the league but were eliminated in the semi-finals by Gunaratne's former club Ratnam SC.

Gunaratne left Negombo at the end of the 2008–09 season to join another Negomobo-based club in Don Bosco SC, who had just finished second in "Segment B". Don Bosco topped "Segment B" in the 2009-10 Kit Premier League, but lost out in the semi-finals where they were defeated by Air Force. Chathura opened the scoring with a goal in first-half injury time, but two late goals from Air Force saw Don Bosco eliminated. Don Bosco SC won the first united Kit Premier League in 2010–11, winning thirteen of their twenty-two games. The club also reached the final of the Sri Lanka FA Cup, but were beaten 2-0 by Sri Lanka Army SC.

== International career ==
Gunaratne first played for Sri Lanka in 2006, coming on as a substitute four times. He played two games in 2007, starting both, before making eight appearances in 2008. In 2009 Gunaratne played ten games for Sri Lanka, scoring two goals, including three appearances in the AFC Challenge Cup in April, where Sri Lanka defeated Brunei and Chinese Taipei before drawing with Pakistan.

In 2010 Gunaratne played in the February AFC Challenge Cup matches against Myanmar, Tajikistan and Bangladesh, scoring Sri Lanka's second goal against Bangladesh in a 3-0 win. In 2011, Gunaratne featured in Sri Lanka's 1-1 draw with the Philippines in a 2014 FIFA World Cup qualifier on 29 June, scoring his country's goal and the match's first goal on 43 minutes. He then played in the away qualifier against the Philippines on 3 July 2011 which Sri Lanka lost 4-0. He gave away the penalty that led to the Philippines' final goal.
