= Football in Sri Lanka =

- Country: Sri Lanka
- Governing body: Football Federation of Sri Lanka
- National team: Sri Lanka
- First played: 1890

Club competitions
- Sri Lanka Super League; Sri Lanka FA Cup

International competitions
- SAFF Championship; Bangabandhu Cup

Football in Sri Lanka is mainly played at a semi-professional and recreational level. Despite not being as well-regarded as the country's cricket team, football is the third biggest sport in Sri Lanka, after cricket and rugby union. Approximately 12% of the people in Sri Lanka are considered association football fans. Only three countries in the world have a lower percentage.

The Sri Lanka national football team uses the 25,000-capacity Sugathadasa Stadium for their home games.

== History ==
Football was introduced to Sri Lanka (then called Ceylon) by the British. There is evidence of it being played in Galle Face, a sandy area near the coast, by British servicemen stationed in Colombo in the 1890s. The game was also played at grounds of the barracks at Echelon Barracks and the army grounds (presently the Taj Samudra Hotels).

British servicemen of the Royal Air Force, Royal Navy, Royal Engineers, Royal Artillery and the Royal Garrison Command began and promoted competitive football in Ceylon. The British administrative service and the planting community enthusiastically took it to the Central, Southern, and Up-Country regions. By early 1900 competitive football was popular with the local youth.

The game became popular and local football clubs were formed. St. Michael's SC, Havelock's Football Club, Java Lane SC, Wekande SC, Moors FC, and CH & FC, the last being a European monopoly, were some of the first clubs in Columbo. Harlequins FC and Saunders SC soon joined. The trophies of the early tournaments were the De Mel Shield and the Times of Ceylon Cup.

Football also became popular in the country's Southern Provence, where the planting and administrative community promoted the game. British planter T R. Brough in Deniyaya heavily promoted football in the south between 1910 and 1920, and British servicemen from the Navy wireless station in Matara also helped popularise it.

== Governing body ==
The Football Federation of Sri Lanka is the governing body for football in the country. The association administers the national football team as well as the Sri Lanka Super League.

== Football stadiums ==
Stadium	Capacity	City	Tenants	Image
Sugathadasa Stadium	25,000	Colombo	Sri Lanka national team, Colombo FC, Renown SC	

== Competitions ==
=== League ===
- Sri Lanka Super League (1st tier)
- Sri Lanka Champions League (2nd tier)
- Division I (3rd tier)
- Division II (4th tier)
- Division III (5th tier)

=== Cup ===
- Sri Lanka FA Cup
- Ceylon Provincial League

== Attendances ==
The average attendance per top-flight football league season and the club with the highest average attendance:

Season	League average	Best club	Best club average
2018–19	1,318	Colombo FC	2,387

Source: League page on Wikipedia

== See also ==
- Lists of stadiums
