= Mohamed Ramees =

Sri Lankan footballer

Personal information
- Full name: Mohamed Hassan Ramees
- Date of birth: 8 November 1980 (age 45)
- Position: Defender

Team information
- Current team: Blue Star

Senior career*
Years	Team	Apps	(Gls)
2004–	Blue Star		

International career^{‡}
2007	Sri Lanka	1	(0)
- * Club domestic league appearances and goals as of 25 March 2018 (UTC) ‡ National team caps and goals as of 25 March 2018 (UTC)

Mohamed Hassan Ramees (born 8 November 1980) is a Sri Lankan footballer who plays as a defender for Sri Lankan club Blue Star and the Sri Lankan national team.

== International career ==
Ramees made his senior international debut on 28 October 2007, playing in a 5–0 loss to Qatar in a first round match of the 2010 FIFA World Cup qualifiers (AFC).

== See also ==
- Football in Sri Lanka
- List of football clubs in Sri Lanka
