= Mohammadu Fasal =

Sri Lankan footballer (born 1990)

Personal information
- Full name: Mohammadu Naizer Mohamed Fasal
- Date of birth: 30 April 1990 (age 36)
- Position: Forward

Team information
- Current team: Colombo

Senior career*
Years	Team	Apps	(Gls)
2018	Air Force		
2018–2021	Colombo		
2021–	Blue Star		

International career^{‡}
2014–2024	Sri Lanka	32	(1)
- * Club domestic league appearances and goals ‡ National team caps and goals as of 25 March 2024

Mohammadu Naizer Mohamed Fasal (born 30 April 1990), commonly known as Mohammadu Fasal, is a Sri Lankan footballer who currently plays as a forward for Colombo.

== Career ==
=== International ===
He made his international debut on March 12, 2015, in the match against Bhutan valid for the 2018 FIFA World Cup qualification, entering the seventy-fifth instead of Madushan de Silva.

== Career statistics ==
=== International ===
As of matches played 14 October 2025

National team	Year	Apps	Goals
Sri Lanka	2014	2	0
Sri Lanka	2015	3	0
Sri Lanka	2018	4	1
Sri Lanka	2019	9	0
Sri Lanka	2020	2	0
Sri Lanka	2021	7	0
Sri Lanka	2022	2	0
Sri Lanka	2023	2	0
Sri Lanka	2024	1	0
Total		32	1

List of international goals scored by Ahmed Waseem Razeek
No.	Date	Venue	Opponent	Score	Result	Competition
1	29 August 2018	Sheikh Kamal Stadium, Gopalganj, Bangladesh	Bangladesh	0–1	0–1	International Friendly
