= Sri Lanka FA Cup =

- Founded: 1948
- Region: Sri Lanka
- Current champions: Police SC (2nd title)
- Most championships: Saunders SC (15 titles)
- 2019–20

The Sri Lanka FA Cup is an annual knockout cup competition in Sri Lankan football. It is the oldest association football competition in Sri Lanka. The Sri Lanka FA Cup is organised by the Football Federation of Sri Lanka.

== Previous winners ==
=== Ceylon FA Cup ===
- 1948 : Sunrise SC (Colombo) 2–1 Police SC (Colombo)
- 1949 : Saunders SC (Colombo) 1–0 Police SC (Colombo)
- 1951 : Sunrise SC (Colombo) 2–0 Police SC (Colombo)
- 1952 : Saunders SC (Colombo)
- 1953–54 : Police SC (Colombo)
- 1954 : Saunders SC (Colombo)
- 1955 : Saunders SC (Colombo) 2–0 Royal Air Force
- 1958 : Old Joes SC
- 1960 : Saunders SC (Colombo) 7–2 Wellawatte Spinning and Weaving Mills
- 1960–61 : Army SC (Colombo) bt Ratnam SC (Colombo)
- 1963 : Saunders SC (Colombo)
- 1964 : Saunders SC (Colombo)
- 1967 : Sunrise SC (Colombo)
- 1967 : Victory SC (Colombo)
- 1968–69 : Army SC
- 1969 : Colombo Municipal Council SC
- 1971 : Colombo Municipal Council SC
- 1972 : Colombo Municipal Council SC
- 1973 : Police SC (Colombo)
- 1982 : National united SC (Gampola)
- 1983–84 : Saunders SC (Colombo) bt Renown SC (Colombo)
- 1984–85 : Saunders SC (Colombo) 4–2 Renown SC (Colombo)
- 1985–86 : Air Force SC (Colombo) bt Renown SC (Colombo)
- 1986–87 : Renown SC (Colombo)

=== Bristol/Sharp/Holcim/Cargills Food City FA Cup ===
- 1987–88 : Saunders SC (Colombo)
- 1988–89 : Renown SC (Colombo) 4–0 Saunders SC (Colombo)
- 1989–90 : Renown SC (Colombo) bt Air Force SC (Colombo)
- 1990–91 : York SC (Kandy) bt Old Benedictans SC (Colombo)
- 1991–92 : Saunders SC (Colombo) bt Old Benedictans SC (Colombo)
- 1992–93 : Saunders SC (Colombo)
- 1993–94 : Renown SC (Colombo) bt Police SC (Colombo)
- 1994–95 : Renown SC (Colombo) 2–0 Ratnam SC (Colombo)
- 1995–96 : Old Benedictans SC (Colombo) bt Renown SC (Colombo)
- 1996–97 : Saunders SC (Colombo) 1–0 Police SC (Colombo)
- 1997–98 : not known
- 1998–99 : Saunders SC (Colombo) 3–2 Renown SC (Colombo)
- 1999–2000 : Ratnam SC (Colombo) 2–1 Saunders SC (Colombo)
- 2000–01 : Saunders SC (Colombo) 4–0 Negombo Youth SC
- 2001–02 : Ratnam SC
- 2002–03 : Renown SC (Colombo) 1–0 Air Force SC (Colombo)
- 2003–04 : Ratnam SC (Colombo) 2–2 (4–2 pen.) Renown SC (Colombo)
- 2005 : Ratnam SC (Colombo) 3–1 Saunders SC (Colombo)
- 2006 : Ratnam SC (Colombo) 2–2 (5–3 pen.) Negombo Youth SC
- 2007 : Negombo Youth SC 3–0 Saunders SC (Colombo)
- 2008 : Police SC (Colombo) 1–1 (6–5 pen.) Civil Security Force
- 2009 : Ratnam SC (Colombo) 3–3 (3–0 pen.) Army SC
- 2010 : Navy SC (Colombo) 2–1 Nandimithra SC
- 2011 : Army SC 2–0 Don Bosco SC (Negombo)
- 2012 : Navy SC (Colombo) 1–1 (5–4 pen.) Army SC
- 2013–14 : Army SC 2–0 Blue Star SC (Kalutara)
- 2014–15 : Colombo FC 1–0 Blue Star SC (Kalutara)
- 2015–16 : Army SC 3–1 Renown SC
- 2016–17 : Army SC 5–1 Java Lane SC
- 2018 : Army SC 4–2 Saunders SC
- 2019–20 : Police SC 1–1 (6–5 pen.) Saunders SC
