= Colombo FC =

Sri Lankan football club

Colombo
- Full name: Colombo Football Club
- Nickname: Colombo Lions
- Short name: CFC
- Founded: April 2008; 18 years ago
- Ground: Sugathadasa Stadium (most games); Colombo Racecourse
- Capacity: 2,500; 25,000
- President: Saif Yusoof
- Head coach: Roomy Hassan
- League: Sri Lanka Super League
- 2023: Champions
- Website: colombofc.com
Home colours	Away colours

Colombo Football Club (Colombo FC) is a professional football club based in Colombo, that competes in the Sri Lanka Super League, the top flight of Sri Lankan football.

They are 3-time winners of the prestigious Dialog Champions League and also have won the 2015 FA Cup championship, defeating Blue Star SC 1–0 in the final on July 4 at the Sugathadasa Stadium. Colombo FC completed their Hat-trick of clinching the Dialog Champions League for the 2017/18 Sri Lanka Premier League, after defeating Renown SC 1–0 on 14 January 2018 at Race Course.The club's motto is "Pride of Colombo City" which was announced by the club founder & owner Saif Yusoof in 2017. In the Dialog Champions League 2018 edition, Colombo FC emerged as the Runner-up after defeating Navy Sea Hawks SC 4–0 on 13 February 2019 at the Sugathadasa Stadium, Colombo. Colombo FC qualified for the 2019 AFC Cup after winning the Premier Championship on 2018. They played their Preliminary Stage match of the 2019 AFC Cup against Transport United FC from Bhutan, in which they ended up winning the First Leg of the tie which played at the Race Course International Stadium, Colombo with a 7–1 scoreline. In the Second Leg they emerged victorious after beating Transport United 1–2 in Changlimithang Stadium, Thimpu. After winning the Preliminary Stage with a 9–2 aggregate they will face Chennaiyin FC, Champions of ISL 2018 on 6 March 2019 at the Race Course International Stadium, Colombo as their Playoff Stage opponents.

Colombo Football Club emerged as the Champions of the inaugural FFSL President's Cup 2020 after defeating Blue Eagles SC 4–0 in the final geld at Sugathadasa Stadium on 2 September 2020.

== History ==
Founded in April 2008, Colombo FC was created to support the growth of local talent from Colombo's City Football League and the Colombo Football League. The club was able to enter the 3rd Division of the Sri Lanka Football Federation during the 2009/10 season. They became Division 3 runners-up in the 2010/11 season after losing to Matara SC 2–0 in the finals, held at Vernon Fernando Stadium, Kalutara.

Colombo FC won its first championship trophy on April 25, 2010, beating Java Lane SC 3–2 to win the Silver Cup. In Division 2 of the 2011/12 football season, Colombo FC lost in the semifinals to the eventual champions in a 5–4 penalty shoot-out after a 1–1 tie. That year, all four semifinalist teams, namely Super Sun, Civil Security. Solid FC and Colombo FC, were promoted to Division 1.

=== Dialog Champions League ===
In 2014/15, Colombo FC on their debut entry to the Dialog Champions League finished at the top of the League table, but a knock-out system was introduced taking the top 8 teams together in a knock out series. The quarterfinal set with Don Bosco SC saw them out of the race. They lost 3–2, where the played at Vernon Fernando Stadium, Kalutara.

In the 2015/16 season, Colombo FC won the Dialog Champions League Cup. With a closely contested Super 8 round this time on a league basis, they secured their debut championship on the last day, winning with a margin of 1 goal on goal difference. . Renown SC had equal points that year. Colombo FC went on to win 23 games, losing only once that season. They beat SL Army on the last day 2–0. Colombo FC player Bodrie Dimitri was crowned MVP of the season.

In the 2016/17 season, Colombo FC retained their Dialog League Champions title. This time with a close contest between SL Army and Renown SC. Colombo FC won on their last day where they played Renown SC and won the league by a one-point difference above SL Army.

Colombo FC won the Sri Lanka Champions League (then sponsored as the Dialog Champions League) for the third consecutive season in 2017–18, defeating Renown SC 1–0 in the final on 14 January 2018 at Race Course.

=== Sri Lanka FA Cup ===
Colombo FC first entered the Holcim FA Cup in 2009, losing in round four.

In the 2010 Holcim FA Cup, Colombo FC became the first 3rd Division team to have reached round 5 of the FA Cup, organized by the Football Federation of Sri Lanka. They lost in the pre-quarterfinals (round 5) to Police SC, 4–0.

The team reached the semifinals in 2014, where they lost to Sri Lanka Army SC 2–1.

Colombo FC emerged as champions of the Cargils FA Cup in 2015, defeating Blue Star SC 1–0 on July 4, 2015, at Sugathadasa Stadium.

In the 2016 Cargils FA Cup, the team lost to Sri Lanka Army SC 1–0 in the semifinals.

In 2017, Colombo FC went on to play a FA Cup without foreign players as per tournament guidelines, having qualified for the semifinals, the team lost to Sri Lanka Army SC 3–2 marking the end to the 55th edition.

=== City League President's Trophy ===
Colombo FC previously were judged Joint-Champions with Renown SC in the 2016 edition, managed to win the 2017 edition of the President's Cup after defeating arch rivals Java Lane SC 4–2 on penalties in the finals. In Progress Colombo FC lost to the newly promoted Morgasmulla 2–0 in the first game, but managed to beat Saunders SC in the next fixture. Qualifying into the semifinals, Colombo FC defeated Renown SC, While Java Lane SC defeated Moragasmulla.

Colombo FC emerged as winners in the 2018 edition by defeating Saunders SC 2–0 in the final.

In the 2019 edition, Colombo FC competed in Group B alongside Saunders SC and Blue Star SC. Colombo FC defeated Blue Star SC 2-0 and drew 0–0 against Saunders to earn a spot in the Semi finals. Colombo beat archrivals Renown SC 3-0 while Saunders defeated Java Lane 2–1 in the other Semi finals. Final game was yet to be played due to the Covid Situation in Sri Lanka.

=== 2017 AFC Cup ===
After winning the 2015–2016 season, Colombo FC qualified for the AFC Cup pre-qualifying round, and were paired against India's football giants Mohun Bagan AC. The qualifier consisted of two legs. The first leg was played January 31, 2017, at Colombo Racecourse, and was won by Mohun Bagan AC, 2–1. The second leg was played a week later in Kolkata where Mohun Bagan won at their home turf 2–1 as well to continue to their journey in the AFC Cup.

=== 2018 AFC Cup ===
After winning the Dialog Champions League for second time in the 2016/2017 season, Colombo FC were due to make a second appearance for the upcoming 2018 AFC Cup. Unfortunately due to confusion at Football Federation of Sri Lanka, no Sri Lankan club has fulfilled any AFC Club licensing, and they will not be eligible to play.

=== 2019 AFC Cup ===
Colombo FC were given the opportunity to represent Sri Lanka in the 2019 AFC Cup edition after missing out in 2018. In the preliminary process, Bhutan's Transport United F.C were drafted against Colombo. A thrashing 7–1 in Colombo and 2–1 in Bhutan gave Colombo FC to progress through to the Play off round where Colombo met Indian Super League Champions Chennaiyin FC. Colombo FC settled for a draw in Colombo and went down 1–0 in the reverse fixture at Ahmedabad.

=== FFSL President's Cup 2020 ===
Post COVID-19, FFSL organized an invitational tournament with the Top 20 clubs in Sri Lanka. Colombo FC were drafted along with SLTB, Crystal Palace Gampola and Blue Eagles SC in the initial group. A 3–0 win over SLTB, 4–1 win over Crystal Palace and 2–0 defeat against Blue Eagles allowed Colombo to progress through to the quarterfinals.

Colombo defeated SL Police 3–0 in the quarterfinals and went on to draw 2–2 against Red Star FC in the semifinals. In penalties Colombo went on to win 3–2.

Colombo FC outclassed Blue Eagles SC 4–0 to secure the inaugural title in the final.

== Youth programs ==
Colombo FC runs and sponsors free youth football programs in the city.

Colombo FC has a special program that runs weekly at Maligawatte Grounds for the youth in the area that has been running a number of years. Colombo FC had their debut game as a club in July 2008 against Maligawatte Youth where the lost 2–1. With the fall of many Colombo clubs, Colombo FC has been instrumental in the efforts of ensuring practice for colombo based youth teams.

The Colombo Football Academy runs summer programs for children of locals and expats alike and charge a training fee.

A full-time training schedule for private students and institutions is set to begin in March 2018

Colombo FC opened its academy in October 2020 at Racecourse Stadium. The academy program enables future football players to come through the ranks to be promoted to the Colombo FC Squad.

== Kit manufacturers and shirt sponsors ==
Period	Kit manufacturer	Shirt sponsor
2018-	Nivia	

== Current squad ==
=== First-team squad ===
As of 10 July 2021

Note: Flags indicate national team as defined under FIFA eligibility rules; some limited exceptions apply. Players may hold more than one non-FIFA nationality.

No.	Pos.	Nation	Player
1	GK	SRI	Mohamed Imran
2	MF	CIV	Jean Furic Seka
3	DF	SRI	Eranga Perera
4	DF	SRI	Chalana Chameera
7	FW	SRI	Mohamed Aakib Faizer
8	DF	SRI	Shabeer Razooniya
9	DF	SRI	Niran Hewavitharanage
10	FW	SRI	Zohar Mohamed Zarwan
11	FW	SRI	Ahamed Abdul Rahman
13	DF	SRI	Mohamed Siraj Jain
14	MF	SRI	Mohamed Rawme Mohideen

No.	Pos.	Nation	Player
16	FW	JPN	Toshiki Okamoto
19	DF	SRI	Afeel Mohamed
20	FW	CMR	Tagne Bodric
21	MF	SRI	Ajith Prashanth
23	FW	SRI	Sathar Shafran
24	DF	SRI	Charitha Rathnayake
25	GK	SRI	Mohamed Shakir
27	DF	SRI	Mohamed Basith
22	FW	SRI	Aaqil Rizan

== Team management ==
Position	Name
Head coach	(Sri Lanka) Hassan Roomy

== Club officials ==
- Founder & President & Team Manager – Saif Yusoof
- Media Officer– Aabid Akram
- Technical director - M. Premadasa
- Equipment manager - M. Iqbal
- Video Analyst - Pulina Sulara
- Interpreter - Piyal Perera
- Security Officer - Andy Sambo

== Coaching staff ==
* Hassan Roomy (2010–present*)

- Late Dickson Silva (2008)
- Sisira De Silva (2009)
- Subhani Hashimdeen (2010)

=== Assistant coaches ===
- Mahinda Galagedera – Goalkeeping coach (2009)
- Lalith Weerasinghe – Goalkeeping coach (2013–2017)

==== Medical staff ====
- Physio (Current*) - Asanka Nayanananda
- Trainer - Hettiarachchige

===== Team manager =====
- M. Iqbal (2008–2017)
- Saif Yusoof (2017–present)

== Stadium ==
Colombo FC plays most of their home games at City Football League Complex, Slave Island which has a capacity of 500–700 spectators. They play their FA Cup knockouts at Sugathadasa Stadium, Colombo (depending on availability) and Kelaniya Football Complex (Kelaniya). During AFC affiliated tournaments Colombo FC play at Race Course Complex, Colombo. In 2017 Sri Lankan Premier League Season, Colombo FC used Beddagana national training grounds & Shalika grounds, Narehenpita for their home fixtures.

== Honours ==
=== Domestic ===
==== Leagues ====
- Sri Lanka Champions League
  - Winners (4): 2015, 2016–17, 2017–18, 2023
- Premier Division 1
  - Runners up (1): 2012–13
- Premier Division 3
  - Runners up (1): 2009–10

==== Cups ====
- Sri Lanka FA Cup
  - Winners (1): 2014
  - Semi finalist (2) : 2016
- City League President's Trophy
  - Winners (2): 2016, 2017
- Silver Cup
  - Winners (1): 2010

==== Domestic Doubles ====
- 2017–18 Sri Lanka Football Premier League: Dialog Champions League and City League President's Cup | 2017

=== International ===
- 2017 AFC Cup
  - Appearance (1): 1st Round
- 2019 AFC Cup
- Preliminary Stage - 1st Leg: Colombo FC 7-1 Transport United
- Preliminary Stage - 2nd Leg: Transport United 1-2 Colombo FC

Preliminary round
Team 1	Agg	Team 2	1st Leg	2nd Leg
Colombo (Sri Lanka)	9-2	(Bhutan) Transport United	7-1	2-1

Play-off round
Team 2	Agg	Team 2	1st Leg	2nd Leg
Colombo (Sri Lanka)	South Asia	(India) Chennaiyin	0-0	0-1
