= 2025–26 Sri Lanka Champions League =

Sri Lanka Champions League
- Season: 2025–26
- Champions: Pelicans

The 2025–26 Sri Lanka champions League, was the 36th season of the Sri Lanka Champions League, the top-tier football league in Sri Lanka. But It was succeeded by the professional Sri Lanka Super League which serves as the first division.
