= AFC club competitions ranking =

Ranking system used by the Asian Football Confederation

The AFC club competitions ranking is a ranking system launched by the Asian Football Confederation (AFC) in 2014. It was initially launched by the AFC to provide an informative ranking, rather than to determine the number of places each country would be allocated in its club competitions.

In 2024, the AFC announced changes in the format for ranking the three revamped Club competitions – AFC Champions League Elite (ACLE), AFC Champions League Two (ACL2), AFC Challenge League (ACGL) – which would come into effect from the 2024–25 season. Using a weighted formula, the current structure takes into account the results of clubs from each member association from the past eight seasons.

Following the conclusion of the inaugural AFC Women's Champions League, the AFC introduced a ranking system for women's club competitions. This ranking system takes into account the results of clubs from each member association (70%), and each member associations FIFA Women's World Ranking (30%). This system came into effect from the 2025–26 season.

== Men's ranking ==
The men's club competitions ranking (former member association ranking, or MA ranking) is used to rank associations and determine the total number of clubs from each association that will participate in the AFC Champions League Elite (ACLE), AFC Champions League Two (ACL2), and AFC Challenge League (ACGL). The ranking is provisional, as all teams participating in AFC club competition must pass club licensing requirements and be confirmed by the AFC prior to entry. If clubs are unable to meet said requirements, their spot will be redistributed to another club in their member association. If no clubs from a member association are able to meet the necessary licensing requirements, the AFC may redistribute the qualification position to another member association or adjust the structure of its competition to reflect the total number of teams participating.

Due to the 2020 AFC Cup being cancelled due to the COVID-19 pandemic in Asia and Australia, the AFC announced that all points from the 2020 AFC Champions League and AFC Cup would be excluded from all ranking calculations. The AFC later reaffirmed this decision in 2022, when the ranking system was adjusted to take into account the results of the previous eight seasons.

=== Calculation principle ===
From the 2024–25 season onwards, clubs are awarded points based on their performance and bonus points. Performance points are awarded based on the results of each club in AFC club competitions. In the AFC Champions League Elite, three points are awarded for each win by a club, and one for a draw (in the qualifying rounds teams receive 0.3 points for a win and 0.15 points for a draw). Clubs participating in the Champions League Two and Challenge League will be awarded two-thirds and one-third of the ACLE points respectively. As is the case in the UEFA men's association coefficient, results determined by extra time do count in determining the allocation of points, but results determined by penalty shootouts do not affect the allocation of points, other than for bonus points given for qualification into the latter rounds.

Bonus points are awarded to clubs based on their qualification into later rounds of the competition. Clubs can receive a maximum of 10.5 bonus points in the ACLE, 7 in the ACL2, and 5 in the ACGL. Clubs eliminated in the qualifying rounds of the ACGL are awarded 0.5 participation points.

At the end of each season, the total number of points awarded to each member association is based on the average performance of all clubs participating in AFC Club competitions.

Performance points	Score (Note: There is a points multiplier which takes into consideration the maximum number of points that can be earned in each competition, where in 2025 it is calculated as: ACLE: 1; ACL2: 0.666 (by formula 2/3 * 49.5/49.5); ACGL: 0.5 (By formula 1/3 * 49.5/33.0))		
Performance points	ACLE	ACL2	ACGL
Wins in qualifying rounds	0.3	0.2	0.15
Draws in qualifying rounds	0.15	0.1	0.075
Wins in Group stage/League phase onwards	3	2	1.5
Draws in Group stage/League phase onwards	1	0.666	0.5
Bonus points	Score		
Bonus points	ACLE	ACL2	ACGL
Group stage/League phase participation	3	2	1.5
Elimination in qualifying rounds	– (Note: Losing teams in ACLE or ACL2 qualifying rounds qualify to the ACL2 or ACGL group stage respectively, earning the respective participation points.)	–	0.5
Round of 16 participation	3	2	– (Note: The ACGL knockout stage begins at the quarter-finals.)
Quarter-finals participation	1.5	1	1.5
Semi-finals and Final participation	1.5	1	0.75

==== New Performance points for West Region for 2025–26 season ====
Performance points	Score		
Performance points	ACLE	ACL2	ACGL
Wins in Group stage/League phase onwards	3	2	1.5
Draws in Group stage/League phase onwards	1	0.666	0.5

=== Current rankings ===
==== 2026–27 season ====
The ranking below takes into account of each association's performance in Asian competitions over the past eight seasons, with the 2026–27 season underway. The final ranking at the end of the 2026–27 season will be used to determine the slot allocation for the 2028–29 AFC club competitions.

As of 5 November 2026, the ranking is as follows:

Ranking				Member association (L: League, C: Cup)	Club points								Total	Active teams (Note: Number of teams still active from association in AFC Champions League Elite, AFC Champions League Two or AFC Challenge League.)	2028–29 Competition Slot Allocation (direct+indirect)			
Region	2026–27	2025–26	Mvmt	Member association (L: League, C: Cup)	2018 (×0.3)	2019 (×0.4)	2021 (×0.5)	2022 (×0.6)	2023–24 (×0.7)	2024–25 (×0.8)	2025–26 (×0.9)	2026–27 (×1.0)	Total	Active teams	ACLE	ACL2	ACGL	Total
West Region
W1	1	1	—	Saudi Arabia (L, C)	10.000	26.350	20.950	19.075	27.100	34.542	31.100	10.078	120.132	6/6	3+2	1+0	0	6
W2	4	4	—	(United Arab Emirates) United Arab Emirates (L, C)	8.100	7.633	14.400	8.083	25.500	16.400	19.550	9.933	76.031	5/5	3+1	1+0	0	5
W3	5	5	—	Iran (L, C)	18.850	11.500	14.225	13.250	9.300	13.274	16.102	6.778	63.717	3/3	3+0	1+0	0	4
W4	6	6	—	Qatar (L, C)	19.850	15.900	7.300	13.500	8.100	14.701	15.896	6.000	61.802	4/4	2+0	1+0	0	3
W5	10	10	—	Uzbekistan (L, C)	9.400	9.000	8.960	10.057	11.250	10.333	6.760	5.856	45.016	3/3	1+1	1+0	0	3
W6	12	13	+1	Iraq (L, C)	8.633	8.300	3.250	7.450	7.473	8.500	11.086	7.333	41.346	2/2	1+0	1+0	0	2
W7	13	12	–1	Jordan (L, C)	7.633	7.967	4.893	6.000	5.415	12.000	12.555	4.667	40.880	2/2	0+1	1+0	0	2
W8	18	18	—	Kuwait (L, C)	0.000	3.433	7.070	4.160	3.165	8.075	9.572	5.100	29.795	2/3	0	1+1	0	2
W9	19	16	–3	Bahrain (L, C)	1.633	2.500	5.510	5.215	7.020	7.583	7.207	4.333	29.174	2/2	0	1+1	0	2
W10	20	17	–3	Oman (L, C)	1.583	1.433	0.000	6.795	9.780	9.000	6.722	3.667	28.888	2/2	0	1+1	0	2
W11	21	21	—	Turkmenistan (L, C)	7.583	5.267	3.125	2.640	3.463	7.450	6.494	5.283	27.040	1/2	0	0+1	1+0	2
W12	23	25	+2	Lebanon (L, C)	3.933	6.933	2.670	1.525	4.840	4.500	5.806	5.250	23.667	1/2	0	0+1	1+0	2
W13	24	24	—	Kyrgyzstan (L, C)	0.150	2.433	0.835	0.565	11.830	4.600	6.158	1.050	20.328	0/2	0	0	1+0	1
W14	25	26	+1	India (L, C)	4.417	3.217	3.677	4.797	3.453	6.500	1.338	3.267	19.417	1/2	0	0	0+1	1
W15	26	23	–3	Tajikistan (L, C)	4.433	3.000	4.970	2.493	2.230	3.276	5.774	3.100	18.989	0/2	0	0	0+1	1
W16	27	28	+1	Bangladesh (L, C)	1.433	6.933	2.790	3.760	4.730	1.500	2.433	3.600	17.155	0/2	0	0	0+1	1
W17	30	30	—	Syria (L, C)	2.000	3.133	1.785	2.890	1.400	2.500	1.000	6.900	15.260	2/2	0	0	0+1	1
W18	33	35	+2	Bhutan (L, C)	0.150	0.100	0.100	0.100	0.100	3.600	2.544	2.100	7.535	0/1	0	0	0+1	1
W19	35	34	–1	Maldives (L, C)	4.300	0.000	0.200	2.030	2.640	1.500	0.500	0.500	6.606	0/1	0	0	0+1	1
W20	36	36	—	Palestine (L, C)	0.150	2.967	0.835	0.610	0.100	2.500	0.000	0.000	4.085	0	0	0	0+1	1
W21	40	40	—	Afghanistan (L)	0.000	0.000	0.000	0.000	0.000	0.500	0.500	0.500	1.350	0/1	0	0	0+1	1
W22	41	39	–2	Nepal (L)	0.000	0.667	0.200	0.100	0.200	0.500	0.000	0.000	0.967	0	0	0	0+1	1
W23	43	42	–1	Sri Lanka (L, C)	0.000	0.350	0.100	0.200	0.000	0.000	0.000	0.000	0.301	0	0	0	0+1	1
W24	44	43	–1	Yemen (L, C)	0.000	0.000	0.000	0.000	0.000	0.000	0.000	0.000	0.000	0	0	0	0+1	1
W24	44	43	–1	Pakistan (L, C)	0.000	0.000	0.000	0.000	0.000	0.000	0.000	0.000	0.000	0	0	0	0+1	1
East Region
E1	2	2	—	Japan (L, C)	13.850	21.800	17.875	20.088	21.350	27.970	30.375	11.650	110.174	6/6	3+2	1+0	0	6
E2	3	3	—	South Korea (L, C)	18.350	13.600	22.750	15.800	22.350	14.762	14.333	6.483	78.637	5/5	3+1	1+0	0	5
E3	7	7	—	Thailand (L, C)	16.200	5.050	8.500	11.110	8.567	14.875	16.208	5.667	55.947	4/4	3+0	1+0	0	4
E4	8	9	+1	Australia (L, C)	7.300	2.600	0.000	7.900	10.593	12.796	17.667	4.556	46.078	3/3	2+0	1+0	0	3
E5	9	11	+2	Malaysia (L, C)	3.633	4.450	4.000	9.677	6.213	15.511	12.083	7.333	45.642	2/2	1+1	1+0	0	3
E6	11	8	–3	China (L, C)	16.200	17.350	0.800	0.500	11.900	10.250	7.383	8.222	43.897	3/3	1+0	1+0	0	2
E7	14	14	—	Singapore (L, C)	5.617	4.133	0.000	3.253	3.640	14.833	14.500	5.333	38.088	2/2	0+1	1+0	0	2
E8	15	15	—	Vietnam (L, C)	3.267	10.752	6.000	5.300	5.400	11.333	8.667	5.133	37.241	2/2	0	1+1	0	2
E9	16	20	+4	Indonesia (L, C)	4.100	5.045	0.000	3.960	3.560	7.204	11.033	8.500	32.309	2/2	0	1+1	0	2
E10	17	19	+2	Cambodia (L, C)	2.250	1.000	0.000	2.070	5.620	11.000	10.100	7.333	31.474	2/2	0	1+1	0	2
E11	22	22	—	Hong Kong (L, C)	3.300	3.650	7.333	6.587	4.900	3.333	4.333	3.667	23.732	2/2	0	0+1	0+1	2
E12	28	27	–1	Philippines (L, C)	5.843	4.782	2.600	0.300	0.600	3.667	5.875	3.250	17.037	1/2	0	0+1	0+1	2
E13	29	29	—	Chinese Taipei (L)	0.000	0.333	2.000	0.000	5.145	6.050	3.600	3.325	16.140	1/2	0	0	0+1	1
E14	31	30	–1	Myanmar (L, C)	4.062	1.600	0.000	0.000	1.640	7.150	2.050	3.700	14.272	1/2	0	0	0+1	1
E15	32	32	—	Mongolia (L, C)	0.100	0.100	0.000	0.100	5.080	2.200	3.600	1.050	9.736	0/2	0	0	0+1	1
E16	34	33	–1	North Korea (L, C)	7.433	11.067	0.000	0.000	0.000	0.000	0.000	0.000	6.657	0	0	0	0+1	1
E17	37	41	+4	Brunei (L, C)	0.000	0.000	0.000	0.000	0.100	0.000	0.500	3.100	3.620	0/1	0	0	0+1	1
E18	38	37	–1	Laos (L, C)	0.150	0.333	0.000	0.000	0.100	1.650	1.550	0.500	3.463	0/1	0	0	0+1	1
E19	39	38	–1	Macau (L, C)	4.000	0.000	0.000	0.000	1.370	0.000	0.000	0.000	2.159	0	0	0	0+1	1
E20	42	43	+1	(Timor-Leste) East Timor (L, C)	0.000	0.000	0.000	0.000	0.000	0.000	0.000	0.500	0.500	0/1	0	0	0+1	1
E21	44	43	–1	Guam (L, C)	0.000	0.000	0.000	0.000	0.000	0.000	0.000	0.000	0.000	0	0	0	0+1	1
E21	44	43	–1	(Northern Mariana Islands) Northern Mariana Islands (L)	Not an AFC member			0.000	0.000	0.000	0.000	0.000	0.000	0	0	0	0+1	1

Indicates active associations which have teams still competing in the current season's ACL Elite
Indicates active associations which have teams still competing in the current season's ACL Two
Indicates active associations which have teams still competing in the current season's Challenge League.
Associations which have no remaining teams in the current season's competitions.
Associations which did not compete in the current season's competitions.

=== 2025–26 season ===
The final ranking at the end of the 2025–26 season will be used to determine the slot allocation for the 2027–28 AFC club competitions.

Ranking		Member association (L: League, C: Cup)	Club points								Total	2027–28 Competition Slot Allocation (direct+indirect)			
Region	2025–26	Member association (L: League, C: Cup)	2017 (×0.3)	2018 (×0.4)	2019 (×0.5)	2021 (×0.6)	2022 (×0.7)	2023–24 (×0.8)	2024–25 (×0.9)	2025–26 (×1.0)	Total	ACLE	ACL2	ACGL	Total
West Region
W1	1	Saudi Arabia (L, C)	18.600	10.000	26.350	20.950	19.075	27.100	34.542	31.100	132.545	3+2	1+0	0	6
W2	4	(United Arab Emirates) United Arab Emirates (L, C)	11.350	8.100	7.633	14.400	8.083	25.500	16.400	19.550	79.470	3+1	1+0	0	5
W3	5	Iran (L, C)	16.200	18.850	11.500	14.225	13.250	9.300	13.274	16.102	71.449	3+0	1+0	0	4
W4	6	Qatar (L, C)	13.400	19.850	15.900	7.300	13.500	8.100	14.701	15.896	69.347	2+0	1+0	0	3
W5	10	Uzbekistan (L, C)	5.050	9.400	9.000	8.960	10.057	11.250	10.333	6.760	47.251	1+1	1+0	0	3
W6	12	Jordan (L, C)	4.900	7.633	7.967	4.893	6.000	5.415	12.000	12.555	43.330	1+0	1+0	0	2
W7	13	Iraq (L, C)	8.933	8.633	8.300	3.250	7.450	7.473	8.500	11.086	42.163	0+1	1+0	0	2
W8	16	Bahrain (L, C)	3.467	1.633	2.500	5.510	5.215	7.020	7.583	7.207	29.548	0	1+1	0	2
W9	17	Oman (L, C)	2.200	1.583	1.433	0.000	6.795	9.780	9.000	6.722	29.412	0	1+1	0	2
W10	18	Kuwait (L, C)	0.000	0.000	3.433	7.070	4.160	3.165	8.075	9.572	28.242	0	1+1	0	2
W11	21	Turkmenistan (L, C)	4.483	7.583	5.267	3.125	2.640	3.463	7.450	6.494	26.704	0	0+1	1+0	2
W12	23	Tajikistan (L, C)	12.900	4.433	3.000	4.970	2.493	2.230	3.276	5.774	22.377	0	0+1	1+0	2
W13	24	Kyrgyzstan (L, C)	1.400	0.150	2.433	0.835	0.565	11.830	4.600	6.158	22.355	0	0	1+0	1
W14	25	Lebanon (L, C)	0.833	3.933	6.933	2.670	1.525	4.840	4.500	5.806	21.687	0	0	0+1	1
W15	26	India (L, C)	6.250	4.417	3.217	3.677	4.797	3.453	6.500	1.338	20.765	0	0	0+1	1
W16	28	Bangladesh (L, C)	1.333	1.433	6.933	2.790	3.760	4.730	1.500	2.433	16.313	0	0	0+1	1
W17	31	Syria (L, C)	5.933	2.000	3.133	1.785	2.890	1.400	2.500	1.000	11.610	0	0	0+1	1
W18	34	Maldives (L, C)	4.300	4.300	0.000	0.200	2.030	2.640	1.500	0.500	8.513	0	0	0+1	1
W19	35	Bhutan (L, C)	0.150	0.150	0.100	0.100	0.100	0.100	3.600	2.544	6.149	0	0	0+1	1
W20	36	Palestine (L, C)	0.200	0.150	2.967	0.835	0.610	0.100	2.500	0.000	4.862	0	0	0+1	1
W21	39	Nepal (L)	0.000	0.000	0.667	0.200	0.100	0.200	0.500	0.000	1.134	0	0	0+1	1
W22	40	Afghanistan (L)	0.150	0.000	0.000	0.000	0.000	0.000	0.500	0.500	0.995	0	0	0+1	1
W23	42	Sri Lanka (L, C)	0.100	0.000	0.350	0.100	0.200	0.000	0.000	0.000	0.405	0	0	0+1	1
W24	43	Yemen (L, C)	0.000	0.000	0.000	0.000	0.000	0.000	0.000	0.000	0.000	0	0	0+1	1
W24	43	Pakistan (L, C)	0.000	0.000	0.000	0.000	0.000	0.000	0.000	0.000	0.000	0	0	0+1	1
East Region
E1	2	Japan (L, C)	21.850	13.850	21.800	17.875	20.088	21.350	27.970	30.375	120.410	3+2	1+0	0	6
E2	3	South Korea (L, C)	9.950	18.350	13.600	22.750	15.800	22.350	14.762	14.333	87.334	3+1	1+0	0	5
E3	7	Thailand (L, C)	15.050	16.200	5.050	8.500	11.110	8.567	14.875	16.208	62.846	3+0	1+0	0	4
E4	8	China (L, C)	24.567	16.200	17.350	0.800	0.500	11.900	10.250	7.383	49.483	2+0	1+0	0	3
E5	9	Australia (L, C)	5.900	7.300	2.600	0.000	7.900	10.593	12.796	17.667	49.178	1+1	1+0	0	3
E6	11	Malaysia (L, C)	4.395	3.633	4.450	4.000	9.677	6.213	15.511	12.083	45.184	1+0	1+0	0	2
E7	14	Singapore (L, C)	5.138	5.617	4.133	0.000	3.253	3.640	14.833	14.500	38.894	0+1	1+0	0	2
E8	15	Vietnam (L, C)	2.800	3.267	10.752	6.000	5.300	5.400	11.333	8.667	38.020	0	1+1	0	2
E9	19	Cambodia (L, C)	1.683	2.250	1.000	0.000	2.070	5.620	11.000	10.100	27.850	0	1+1	0	2
E10	20	Indonesia (L, C)	0.000	4.100	5.045	0.000	3.960	3.560	7.204	11.033	27.299	0	1+1	0	2
E11	22	Hong Kong (L, C)	1.750	3.300	3.650	7.333	6.587	4.900	3.333	4.333	23.933	0	0+1	0+1	2
E12	27	Philippines (L, C)	8.120	5.843	4.782	2.600	0.300	0.600	3.667	5.875	18.590	0	0+1	0+1	2
E13	29	Chinese Taipei (L)	0.000	0.000	0.333	2.000	0.000	5.145	6.050	3.600	14.528	0	0	0+1	1
E14	30	Myanmar (L, C)	1.300	4.062	1.600	0.000	0.000	1.640	7.150	2.050	12.612	0	0	0+1	1
E15	32	Mongolia (L, C)	0.000	0.100	0.100	0.000	0.100	5.080	2.200	3.600	9.804	0	0	0+1	1
E16	33	North Korea (L, C)	3.433	7.433	11.067	0.000	0.000	0.000	0.000	0.000	9.537	0	0	0+1	1
E17	37	Laos (L, C)	0.150	0.150	0.333	0.000	0.000	0.100	1.650	1.550	3.387	0	0	0+1	1
E18	38	Macau (L, C)	0.000	4.000	0.000	0.000	0.000	1.370	0.000	0.000	2.696	0	0	0+1	1
E19	41	Brunei (L, C)	0.000	0.000	0.000	0.000	0.000	0.100	0.000	0.500	0.600	0	0	0+1	1
E20	43	(Timor-Leste) East Timor (L, C)	0.000	0.000	0.000	0.000	0.000	0.000	0.000	0.000	0.000	0	0	0+1	1
E20	43	Guam (L, C)	0.000	0.000	0.000	0.000	0.000	0.000	0.000	0.000	0.000	0	0	0+1	1
E20	43	(Northern Mariana Islands) Northern Mariana Islands (L)	Not an AFC member			0.000	0.000	0.000	0.000	0.000	0.000	0	0	0+1	1

=== Slot allocation ===
The following table shows the slot allocation for the 2026–27 AFC club competitions.

			Champions League Elite				Champions League Two				Challenge League			
Ranking	Member Association		LP		QR		GS		QR		GS		QR	
Ranking	West region	East region	W	E	W	E	W	E	W	E	W	E	W	E
1	Saudi Arabia	Japan	3		2		1							
2	(United Arab Emirates) United Arab Emirates	South Korea	3		1		1							
3	Qatar	Thailand	3				1							
4	Iran	China	2				1							
5	Uzbekistan	Australia	1		1		1							
6	Iraq	Malaysia	1				1							
7	Jordan	Vietnam			1		1							
8	Bahrain	Singapore					1		1					
9	Oman	Hong Kong					1		1					
10	India	Cambodia					1		1					
11	Turkmenistan	Indonesia							1		1			1
12	Kuwait	Philippines							1		1			1
13	Lebanon	Myanmar									1			1
14	Tajikistan	Chinese Taipei											1	
15	Kyrgyzstan	North Korea											1	
16	Bangladesh	Mongolia											1	
17	Syria	Macau											1	
18	Maldives	Laos											1	
19	Palestine	Brunei											1	
20	Bhutan	(Timor-Leste) East Timor											1	
21	Nepal	Guam											1	
22	Afghanistan	(Northern Mariana Islands) Northern Mariana Islands											1	
23	Sri Lanka												1	
24	Yemen												1	
25	Pakistan												1	

=== History ===
The initial ranking system launched in 2014 took into account the results of clubs from each member association (70%), and their FIFA Men's World Ranking (30%), with the member association(s) with the most points in each part being given 70 and 30 points respectively. This system was later adopted for the AFC Women's Champions League in 2025. In 2017 the ratio was adjusted to 90% club points and 10% national team points, the member association with the most points in each part would now be awarded 90 and 10 points. From 2018 onwards the AFC has no longer taken member associations FIFA ranking into account.

The ranking until 2021 consisted of the total points of member associations' clubs over the previous four years. From the 2022 season onwards, the ranking has taken into account the points over the previous eight seasons, with earlier editions having a decreasingly smaller contribution through an applied multiplier.

Due to the 2020 AFC Cup being cancelled due to the COVID-19 pandemic in Asia and Australia, the AFC announced that all points from the 2020 AFC Champions League and AFC Cup would be excluded from all ranking calculations. The AFC later reaffirmed this decision in 2022, when the ranking system was adjusted to take into account the results of the previous eight seasons.

==== Top associations by period ====
The following data indicates the three top-ranked associations by period. Until 2021 the AFC measured each member association's performance over a four seasons period.

Years	1st place	Points	2nd place	Points	3rd place	Points
2011–2014	South Korea	94.866	Saudi Arabia	88.268	Iran	80.794
2012–2015	South Korea	89.837	Saudi Arabia	89.217	Iran	78.153
2013–2016	South Korea	96.311	(United Arab Emirates) United Arab Emirates	87.555	Saudi Arabia	84.698
2014–2017	(United Arab Emirates) United Arab Emirates	95.940	South Korea	87.480	China	86.671
2015–2018	Qatar	100.000	China	95.982	South Korea	88.620
2016–2019	China	100.000	Qatar	97.644	Japan	93.321
2017–2020	China	100.000	Japan	98.938	Saudi Arabia	94.551
2018–2021	Saudi Arabia	100.000	South Korea	95.462	Japan	93.412
2014–2022	Saudi Arabia	93.795	Japan	91.821	South Korea	88.295
2015–2024	Saudi Arabia	103.148	Japan	96.999	South Korea	93.600
2016–2025	Saudi Arabia	119.957	Japan	107.663	South Korea	90.982

Notes

- No points from the 2020 AFC Champions League or 2020 AFC Cup were used in the ranking calculations, as the 2020 AFC Cup was cancelled due to the COVID-19 pandemic.
- Due to AFC competitions shifting from an all-year-round schedule to an August-to-May schedule for the 2023–24 season, there was no AFC competition ranking for 2023.

== Women's ranking ==
The ranking below takes into account of each association's performance in the AFC Women's Champions League and their FIFA Women's World Ranking. The member association(s) with the most points in each part are given 70 and 30 points respectively, with the other teams scaled accordingly. This is the same system used by the AFC for men's competitions from 2014 to 2017.

As of 6 November 2026, the ranking is as follows:

Ranking			Member association (L: League)	Club points	National team points	Total	Active teams	2028–29 Competition Slot Allocation (direct+indirect)
2026–27	2025–26	Mvmt	Member association (L: League)	Club points	National team points	Total	Active teams	2028–29 Competition Slot Allocation (direct+indirect)
1	1	—	Australia (L)	70.00	27.55	97.55	1/1	1+0
2	2	—	Japan (L)	66.87	30.00	96.87	1/1	1+0
3	5	+2	North Korea (L)	53.38	28.83	82.21	2/2	1+0
4	4	—	China (L)	55.13	26.88	82.01	1/1	1+0
5	3	–2	South Korea (L)	53.12	26.94	80.06	1/1	1+0
6	6	—	Vietnam (L)	43.40	23.84	67.24	1/1	0+1
7	9	+2	Uzbekistan (L)	29.33	22.19	51.52	1/1	0+1
8	7	–1	Philippines (L)	27.55	23.51	51.06	1/1	0+1
9	8	–1	Iran (L)	29.54	20.61	50.16	1/1	0+1
10	11	+1	India (L)	26.50	20.51	47.01	1/1	0+1
11	10	–1	Chinese Taipei (L)	16.70	23.67	40.37	0/1	0+1
12	13	+1	Myanmar (L)	14.00	21.85	35.85	1/1	0+1
13	21	+8	(United Arab Emirates) United Arab Emirates (L)	18.36	16.95	35.30	0/1	0+1
14	12	–2	Thailand (L)	10.27	22.31	32.58	0/1	0+1
15	14	–1	Malaysia (L)	10.20	17.82	28.02	0/1	0+1
16	16	—	Hong Kong (L)	6.20	19.22	25.43	0/1	0+1
17	15	–2	Jordan (L)	5.67	19.31	24.98	0/1	0+1
18	25	+7	Singapore (L)	8.86	15.63	24.49	0/1	0+1
19	26	+7	Saudi Arabia (L)	6.11	14.75	20.85	0/1	0+1
20	20	—	Cambodia (L)	3.51	17.25	20.76	0/1	0+1
21	18	–3	Laos (L)	3.36	17.19	20.55	0/1	0+1
22	19	–3	Guam (L)	2.33	18.08	20.41	0/1	0+1
23	22	–1	Bangladesh (L)	2.57	17.68	20.25	0/1	0+1
24	17	–7	Nepal (L)	1.56	18.63	20.19	0	0+1
25	27	+2	Bhutan (L)	4.85	14.04	18.89	0/1	0+1
26	29	+3	Kyrgyzstan (L)	2.55	16.10	18.65	0/1	0+1
27	28	+1	Mongolia (L)	2.76	15.58	18.34	0/1	0+1
28	—	—	Lebanon (L)	1.61	16.56	18.17	0/1	0+1
29	23	–6	Indonesia (L)	0.00	17.69	17.69	0	0+1
30	24	–6	Bahrain (L)	0.00	17.25	17.25	0	0+1
31	—	—	(Timor-Leste) East Timor (L)	2.57	14.45	17.02	0/1	0+1
32	—	—	Palestine (C)	0.00	16.72	16.72	0	0+1
33	—	—	Turkmenistan (L)	0.00	16.00	16.00	0	0+1
34	—	—	Tajikistan (L)	1.61	14.36	15.97	0/1	0+1
35	—	—	Pakistan (L)	0.00	15.17	15.17	0	0+1
36	—	—	Syria (L)	0.00	14.01	14.01	0	0+1
37	—	—	Sri Lanka (L)	0.00	13.77	13.77	0	0+1
38	—	—	Iraq (L)	0.00	13.7	13.7	0	0+1
39	—	—	Maldives (L)	0.00	13.64	13.64	0	0+1
40	—	—	Macau (L)	0.00	12.73	12.73	0	0+1
—			Afghanistan (Note: No women's domestic league)	0.00	0.00 (Note: Unranked in the FIFA Women's World Ranking)	0.00	0	—
—			Brunei	0.00	0.00 (Note: Country does not field a women's national team.)	0.00	0	—
—			Kuwait (L)	0.00	0.00	0.00	0	—
—			(Northern Mariana Islands) Northern Mariana Islands (L)	0.00	0.00 (Note: The Northern Mariana Islands Football Association is not affiliated with FIFA, therefore the Northern Mariana Islands women's national football team is unable to obtain a FIFA ranking)	0.00	0	—
—			Oman	0.00	0.00	0.00	0	—
—			Qatar (L)	0.00	0.00	0.00	0	—
—			Yemen	0.00	0.00	0.00	0	—

Indicates active associations which have teams still competing in the current season's Champions League
Associations which have no remaining teams in the current season's Champions League.
Associations which did not compete in the current season's Champions League.

== See also ==
- UEFA coefficient, a similar system used by UEFA
- CAF 5-year ranking, a similar system used by the Confederation of African Football
