= Thilina Suranda =

Sri Lankan footballer

Personal information
- Date of birth: 16 August 1985 (age 41)
- Place of birth: Sri Lanka
- Position: Defender

Team information
- Current team: Don Bosco

Senior career*
Years	Team	Apps	(Gls)
2010–	Don Bosco		

International career^{‡}
2007–	Sri Lanka	16	(2)
- * Club domestic league appearances and goals ‡ National team caps and goals as of 26 July 2013

Thilina Suranda (Liyana Arachchilage Thilina Suranda Bandara) is a Sri Lankan international footballer who plays as a defender for Don Bosco in the Sri Lanka Football Premier League.
