= Police Football Club =

Police Football Club may refer to:

- Al-Shorta SC (Iraq)
- Al-Shorta SC (Syria)
- Lion City Sailors FC, formerly known as Police Football Club in Singapore
- Sri Lanka Police Sports Club (football)
- Bhayangkara FC (Indonesia)
