= Sri Lanka Super League =

Sri Lankan men's association football league

- Founded: 2021; 5 years ago
- Country: Sri Lanka
- Confederation: AFC
- Number of clubs: 10
- Level on pyramid: 1
- Relegation to: Sri Lanka Champions League
- Domestic cup: Sri Lanka FA Cup
- International cup: AFC Challenge League
- Current champions: Blue Star (1st title)
- Most championships: Blue Star (1 title)
- Current: 2026 Sri Lanka Super League

Sri Lanka Super League (Sinhala: ශ්‍රී ලංකා සුපර් ලීග්; Tamil: இலங்கை சூப்பர் லீக்) is the men's professional top tier football league in Sri Lankan football league system. It is organised by the Football Federation of Sri Lanka. The 2021 Sri Lanka Super League was the first edition of the league.

The league comprises 10 clubs. Each season of the tournament generally runs from April to September. Each club plays the others twice (a double round-robin system), for a total of 90 games.

The competition formed as the Sri Lanka Super League in 2018 by the General Secretary of Football Federation of Sri Lanka Jaswar Umar Lebbe with the assistance and guidance of FIFA. It succeeds the Sri Lanka Champions League as the country's top tier football competition.

== History ==
Professionalism in Sri Lanka did not exist until the General Secretary of Football Federation of Sri Lanka Jaswar Umar Lebbe initiated and designed this competition with the assistance and guidance of FIFA in 2018. Club selection process was through a “Club Licensing Criteria” in association with the Asian Football Confederation.

Since most of the clubs in this league haven't any FIFA Standard Stadiums, Sugathadasa Stadium was chosen as the venue to stage the tournament since the beginning.

== Competition format ==
There are 10 clubs in the Super League. During the course of a season each club plays the others twice (a double round-robin system), for a total of 90 games. Teams receive three points for a win and one point for a draw. No points are awarded for a loss. Teams are ranked by total points, then goal difference, and then goals scored. If still equal, teams are deemed to occupy the same position. The competition will operate without promotion and relegation for the first two seasons.

Due to the COVID-19 situation, inaugural season of the Super League was forced to limit to a single round-robin system.

=== Qualification for Asian competitions ===
The winner of the Super League enters the AFC Challenge League, but currently they do not have an AFC license.

== Clubs ==
The following 10 clubs compete in the Sri Lanka Super League during the 2021 season.

Club	Position in 2018–19	First season in Super League	Seasons in Super League	First season of current spell in Super League	Stadium	Capacity
Defenders Football Club^{a, b}	1st	2021	1	2021	Homagama Ground	5,000
Navy Sea Hawks FC^{a, b}	4th	2021	1	2021	Navy Ground	1,000
Blue Eagles^{a, b}	10th	2021	1	2021	Kelaniya Football Complex	3,000
Colombo Football Club^{a, b}	2nd	2021	1	2021	Sugathadasa Stadium	25,000
Renown Sports Club^{a, b}	5th	2021	1	2021	Sugathadasa Stadium	25,000
Ratnam Sports Club^{a, b}	6th	2021	1	2021	Sugathadasa Stadium	25,000
Red Star Sports Club^{a, b}	8th	2021	1	2021	-	-
Blue Star Sports Club^{a, b}	3rd	2021	1	2021	Kalutara Stadium	15,000
Up Country Lions Sports Club^{a, b}	7th	2021	1	2021	Jayathilake Stadium	5,000
New Young's Sports Club^{a, b}	12th	2021	1	2021	Sri Albert F. Peiries Stadium	5,000

^{a}: Founding member of Sri Lanka Super League
^{b}: Never been relegated from Sri Lanka Super League

== Sponsorship ==
- (India) Nivia Sports (Official match ball)

== Finance ==
The Football Federation of Sri Lanka guaranteed financial support to all the teams in the Super League according to their league positions.

As of 2021, the fixed amount of prize money paid to the clubs are as follows:

- Champions: LKR 5,000,000
- 2nd: LKR 3,500,000
- 3rd: LKR 2,750,000
- 4th: LKR 2,500,000
- 5th: LKR 2,250,000
- 6th: LKR 2,000,000
- 7th: LKR 1,750,000
- 8th: LKR 1,500,000
- 9th: LKR 1,250,000
- 10th: LKR 1,000,000

== Media coverage ==
The Football Federation of Sri Lanka announced that TV 1 as the official media partner to broadcast all live matches across Sri Lanka. The football association's own YouTube channel Football Sri Lanka TV will allow fans abroad to watch the Super League live.
