= 2018 Sri Lanka FA Cup =

Tournament details
- Country: Sri Lanka
- Teams: 715

Final positions
- Champions: Army SC (7th title)

The 2018 Sri Lanka FA Cup (or Vantage FA Cup for sponsorship reasons) was the 56th season of Sri Lanka FA Cup, the top-tier knockout football tournament in Sri Lanka. A total of 715 teams would participate.

== Round of 16 ==
To start on 24 October 2018.

v

v

v

v

v

v

v

v

Police SC 3 – 1 Negombo Youth FC

Air Force SC 0 – 4 Renown SC

Java Lane SC 1 – 3 Colombo SC

Saunders SC 6 – 2 Eveready SC

New Youngs FC 4 – 0 Red Sun SC

Army SC 3 – 0 New Star SC

Prison SC 2 – 0 St. Nicholas SC

SLTB SC 1 – 1 (4 – 2 p) Uruthirapuram SC

== Quarter-finals ==
The draw for the quarter-finals was held on 5 November 2018. All matches take place on 17 & 18 November at the Sugathadasa Stadium.

v

v

v

v

Prison SC 1 – 2 Saunders SC

Colombo FC 0 – 0 (4 – 1 p) New Youngs FC

Renown SC 0 – 0 (1 – 3 p) Police SC

Army SC 2 – 0 SLTB SC

== Semi-finals ==
The draw for the semi-finals was held on 19 November 2018.

v

v

25 Nov – Army SC 1 – 0 Police SC – 5.00pm – Sugathadasa Stadium

25 Nov – Saunders SC 2 – 0 Colombo FC – 7.30pm – Sugathadasa Stadium

== Final ==
v

1 December 7.00pm at the Sugathadasa Stadium

Army SC 4 – 2 Saunders SC

== See also ==
- 2018–19 Sri Lanka Champions League
