= Dawa Gyeltshen =

Bhutanese footballer

Personal information
- Full name: Dawa Gyeltshen
- Date of birth: June 7, 1986 (age 40)
- Place of birth: Bhutan
- Position: Defender

Team information
- Current team: Thimphu City F.C.

Senior career*
Years	Team	Apps	(Gls)
2005–	Thimphu City F.C.		

International career
2009–	Bhutan	9	(0)
- * Club domestic league appearances and goals

Dawa Gyeltshen (born 7 June 1986) is a Bhutanese footballer, who played for Thimphu City F.C. He made his first appearance for the Bhutan national football team in 2009.
