= Leki Dukpa =

Bhutanese professional footballer

Personal information
- Full name: Leki Dukpa
- Date of birth: December 9, 1989 (age 36)
- Place of birth: Thimphu, Bhutan
- Height: 1.77 m (5 ft 9 1/2 in)
- Position: Goalkeeper

Team information
- Current team: Thimphu City FC

Senior career*
Years	Team	Apps	(Gls)
2013–2016	Druk Pol		
2016	Thimphu City FC		

International career
2012–	Bhutan	8	(0)
- * Club domestic league appearances and goals

Leki Dukpa is a Bhutanese professional footballer, who currently plays for Thimphu City. He made his first appearance for the Bhutan national football team in 2012.
