= Zakria Rezai =

Afghan footballer (born 1989)

Zakria Rezai (born 29 July 1989) is an Afghan footballer who plays for Ordu Kabul F.C., football club from Afghanistan. He is also Afghanistan national football team player, and he has 9 caps. He wears number 14 and his position on field is centre back.

== Career ==
Rezai played for Afghanistan in the 2012 AFC Challenge Cup qualification rounds.
