= Kit Premier League Division II =

Fourth-tier football league of Sri Lanka

Division II is the fourth level division tournament organized by the Football Federation of Sri Lanka.
