= Nandimithra SC =

Sri Lankan football club

Nandimithra
- Ground: Kelaniya Football Complex, Colombo
- Capacity: 1,000
- League: Kit Premier League

Nandimithra Sports Club is a Sri Lankan football club. They play in the topflight football league of Sri Lanka, the Sri Lanka Premier League.

Nandimithra finished fifth in Group B of the 2013 competition.
