= Sri Lanka Champions League =

- Founded: 1985; 41 years ago (as Colombo Football League)
- Country: Sri Lanka
- Confederation: AFC
- Number of clubs: 18
- Level on pyramid: 1
- Relegation to: S2 League
- Domestic cup: Sri Lanka FA Cup
- Current champions: Matara City (1st title)
- Most championships: Saunders SC (12 titles)
- Broadcaster: Football Sri Lanka TV
- Website: football.lk

The S1 League (Sinhala: එස්1 ලීගය; Tamil: எஸ்1 லீக்), or simply S1, also known as Sri Lanka Champions League, is the second-tier division of the Sri Lankan football league system. It was succeeded by the professional Sri Lanka Super League which serves as the first division. Until 2019, it was sponsored by Dialog Axiata and was thus officially known as the Dialog Champions League.

The league was conducted in various formats. Apart from the league system, a playoff stage was included in the 2013–14 season. Currently, 18 clubs participate in the tournament. Saunders have won the most titles in the league, winning 12 titles. Rathnam have won the title 5 times, Renown 4 times, and Colombo 3 times. In recent times, different clubs have been able to win the championship title.

== History ==
The competition started in 1985 and has been held every year since. The 2016 Sri Lanka Football Premier League is the 32nd season of the Sri Lanka Football league. The tournament was conducted in various formats. Apart from the league system a playoff stage was included in the 2013–14 season. Currently 18 clubs participate in the tournament. Saunders are the most time champion with 12 titles. Rathnam have won the title five times and Renown four times. In recent times different clubs have been able to win the championship title. Colombo have won the title three times and are the current champions.

== Competition format ==
In the current structure of the league 18 clubs compete for the title. In the first stage the teams are divided into two groups of nine. Those teams compete in a round robin format. The best four teams from each group qualify for the Championship Stage. In that stage the 8 teams compete in a round robin format and the group winner is the champion of the season. The bottom two teams of each group in the first stage are relegated to the Division I.

=== Qualification for international competitions ===
The champion of the league will earn the chance to play in the AFC Cup tournament which is organized by Asian Football Confederation. Also they qualify for the SAFF Club Championship. However the title holders didn't compete in any of the above competitions until 2014. The first team to play in the AFC Cup was Colombo FC, which won the title in 2015.

== Previous winners ==
Champions so far:

Season	Champions	Runners-up
Colombo Football League
1985	Saunders SC	York SC
1986	Saunders SC	
1987	Saunders SC	
1988	Old Bens SC	
Sri Lanka Bristol League
1989	Saunders SC	
1990	Renown SC	
1991	Saunders SC	Ratnam SC
1992	Saunders SC	
1993	Renown SC	
1994	Renown SC	
1995	Pettah United SC	
1996	Saunders SC	
1997	Saunders SC	
1997–98	Ratnam SC	
1998–99	Saunders SC	
Sri Lanka Premier League
1999–2000	Ratnam SC	
2000–01	Saunders SC	Negambo Youth
2001–02	Saunders SC	Negambo Youth
2002–03	Negambo Youth	
2003–04	Blue Star SC	Ratnam SC
2004–05	Saunders SC	Ratnam SC
2005–06	Negambo Youth	Ratnam SC
2006–07	Ratnam SC	Blue Star SC
2007–08	Ratnam SC	
2008–09	Army SC	Ratnam SC
Sri Lanka Champions League
2009–10	Renown SC	Air Force SC
2010–11	Don Bosco SC	Army SC
2011–12	Ratnam SC	Army SC
2013–14	Air Force SC	Ratnam SC
2014–15	Solid SC	Colombo FC
2015–16	Colombo FC	Renown SC
2016–17	Colombo FC	Renown SC
2017–18	Colombo FC	Renown SC
2018–19	Defenders	Colombo FC
2021–22	Matara City	Javalane
2025–26	Pelicans	Javalane

== Most championships ==
The number of national championships that clubs in Sri Lanka have attained.

Club	Number of Championships
Saunders SC	12
Ratnam SC	5
Renown SC	4
Colombo FC	3
Negambo Youth	2
Defenders (Army SC)	2
Old Bens SC	1
Pettah United SC	1
Blue Star SC	1
Don Bosco SC	1
Air Force SC	1
Solid SC	1
Matara City	1
Pelicans	1

== Sponsorship ==
The title sponsor of the current season in Dialog. So the league is known as Dialog Champions League. Other than dialog Cargills also sponsor the previous events. The official ball is supplied by Molten. The official broadcast partner is Football Sri Lanka TV.

== Stadiums ==
Locations of major football grounds in Sri Lanka

Most of the clubs in this league haven't any FIFA Standard Stadiums. So most of the matches are played in the 25,000-capacity Sugathadasa Stadium and Kelaniya Football Complex. Some clubs play their matches in their home stadiums which are located in Colombo, Anuradhapura, Kelaniya and Kalutara.

== Top scorers ==
Year	Best scorers	Team	Goals
2003–04	(Sri Lanka) M.A.M. Farzeen	Blue Star SC	19
2006–07	(Sri Lanka) Kasun Jayasuriya	Ratnam SC	24
2007–08	(Sri Lanka) Kasun Jayasuriya	Ratnam SC	12
2008–09	(Sri Lanka) Kasun Jayasuriya	Renown SC	13
2009–10	(Sri Lanka) Mohamed Fazal	Renown SC	14
2014–15	(Sri Lanka) Mohamed Izzadeen	Army SC	26
2015	(Sri Lanka) M.C.M. Rifnaz	Renown SC	9
2016–17	(Nigeria) Job Micheal	Renown SC	11
2017–18	(Nigeria) Job Micheal	Renown SC	19
2025–26	(Nigeria) Roger Philippe	Saunders SC	10
