= Ratnam SC =

Sri Lankan football club

Ratnam
- Full name: Ratnam Sports Club
- Founded: 1950; 76 years ago
- Ground: Sugathadasa Stadium; Colombo, Sri Lanka
- Capacity: 25,000
- Manager: Fernando Navean
- League: Sri Lanka Super League
- 2021–2022: 9th
Home colours	Away colours

Ratnam Sports Club is a Sri Lankan professional football club based in Colombo, that competes in the Sri Lanka Super League, the top division of Sri Lankan football. The club was founded in 1950.

The team includes national player Kasun Jayasuriya, a member of the Sri Lankan team who finished runners-up in the inaugural AFC Challenge Cup in Bangladesh in 2006 and who had recently become the top-scorer of Sri Lanka's Kit Premier League, having scored 21 goals. Other national team players in the Ratnam side include Chatura Maduranga, Raumy Mohideen, Nadeeka Pushpa Kumara, Fasul Rahman, Dammika Senarath and L. Tharusha.

In the second edition of the tournament in Malaysia, Ratnam defeated Nepalese outfit Manang Marshyangdi Club 2–0 before going down 0–3 to Dordoi-Dynamo Naryn (Kyrgyzstan) and 1–2 to Vakhsh Qughonteppa (Tajikistan).

Ratnam retained their Premier League-title from 2006 by winning against Saunders in the Premiership-final in November 2007. This year had been a change in the way of playing the league. The league was divided into two groups and the first and second best team in each group played each other in a playoff.

== Achievements ==
- Sri Lankan Premier League: 5
  - Winner: 1998, 2000, 2007, 2008, 2012
- Sri Lanka FA Cup: 6
  - Winner: 2000, 2002, 2004, 2005, 2006, 2009
- Champion of Champions Trophy: 3
  - Winner: 2004

== Performance in AFC competitions ==
- Asian Club Championship: 1 appearance

1995: Preliminary Round

- AFC President's Cup: 3 appearances

2006: Group Stage
2007: Semi-Final
2008: Group Stage

- Asian Cup Winners Cup: 1 appearance

1995–96: First Round

== Managerial history ==
- (Sri Lanka) Pakir Ali (2006–07), (2008), (2010)
