= Matara City Club =

Sri Lankan football club

- Ground: Matara Football Complex
- Capacity: 2,000
- League: Sri Lanka Champions League
- 2022: Champions

Matara City Club is a Sri Lankan professional football club based in the coastal city of Matara. They play in the second tier football league of Sri Lanka, the Sri Lanka Champions League. The club was promoted to the Premier League in 2013.

== Honours ==
- Sri Lanka Champions League: 1
  - Winners: 2022
