= Negombo Youth SC =

Sri Lankan football club

Negombo Youth
- Nickname: NYFC
- Ground: Maris Stella Ground, Negombo
- Capacity: 1,000
- League: Sri Lanka Champions League

Negombo Youth Sports Club is a Sri Lankan professional football club. They play in the second division domestic league, the Sri Lanka Champions League.
