= Defenders FC =

Sri Lankan football club

Defenders
- Alternative logo
- Full name: Defenders Football Club
- Short name: DFC
- Founded: 1963
- Ground: Homagama Ground; Homagama, Sri Lanka
- Capacity: 5,000
- Owner: Sri Lanka Army
- Head coach: C. P. Wanigasooriya
- League: Sri Lanka Super League
Home colours	Away colours

Defenders Football Club is a professional football club based in Homagama, Sri Lanka. Formed in 1963 as Sri Lanka Army SC, it was renamed to Defenders FC in 2018. The team is under the patronage of the Sri Lanka Army.

== Honours ==
- Sri Lanka Champions League : 2
  - Winners: 2008–09, 2018–19
- Sri Lanka FA Cup : 7
  - Winners: 1961, 1968, 2011, 2013–14, 2016, 2017, 2018

== Performance in AFC competitions ==
- AFC President's Cup: 2 appearances

2009: Group Stage
2013: Group Stage

- AFC Cup: 1 appearance

2020: Preliminary round 1

== Continental record ==
Season	Competition	Round	Club	Home	Away	Aggregate
2009	AFC President's Cup	Group stage	(Bangladesh) Abahani Ltd	1–2		3rd
2009	AFC President's Cup	Group stage	(Turkmenistan) FC Asgabat	5–1		3rd
2013	AFC President's Cup	Group stage	(Cambodia) Boeung Ket Angkor	6–0		4th
2013	AFC President's Cup	Group stage	(Palestine) Hilal Al-Quds	0–10		4th
2013	AFC President's Cup	Group stage	(Turkmenistan) Balkan	0–5		4th
2020	AFC Cup	Preliminary round 1	(Bhutan) Paro	3–3	2–2	5–5 (a)
