= Pelicans SC =

Sri Lankan football club

Pelicans
- Founded: 1948; 78 years ago
- Ground: St. Anne's College Ground, Kurunegala
- Capacity: 1,000
- League: Sri Lanka Champions League

Pelicans Sports Club is a Sri Lankan professional football club based in Kurunegala. They play in the second division domestic football league, the Sri Lanka Champions League.

== History ==
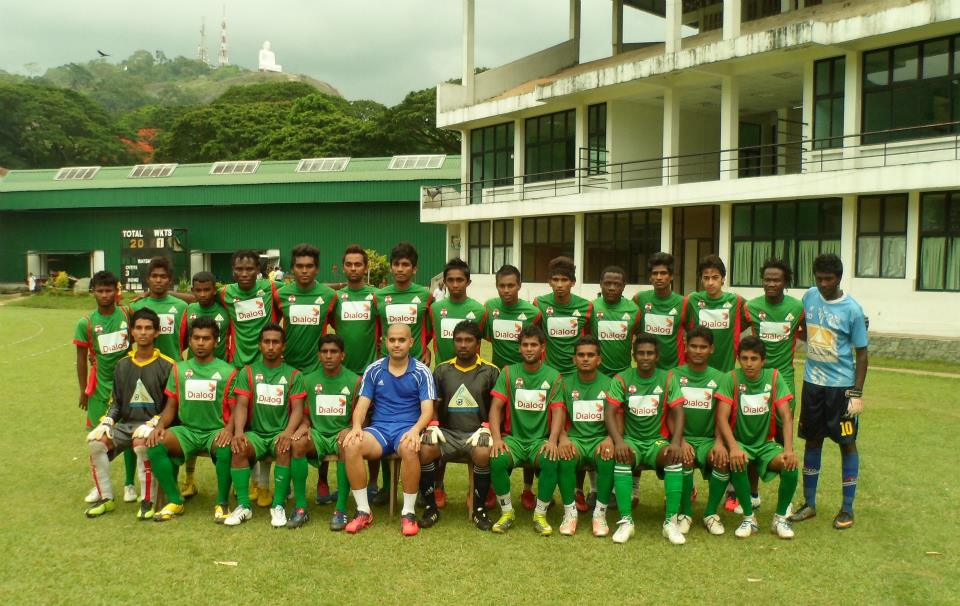
Pelicans SC players in 2013–14 season

The club was founded in 1948.
