= Sugathadasa Stadium =

Multi-purpose stadium in Columbo, Sri Lanka

- සුගතදාස ක්‍රිඩාංගණය சுகததாஸ விளையாட்டரங்கம்
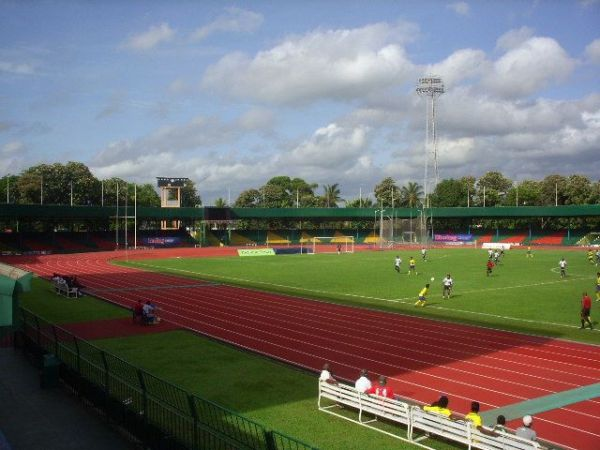
- The stadium on a matchday

- Location within Colombo Municipality
- Location: Colombo, Sri Lanka
- Coordinates: 6°56′53″N 79°52′07″E
- Owner: Sugathadasa National Sports Complex Authority
- Capacity: 25,000
- Surface: Grass (Desso), Track (Mondo)

Construction
- Groundbreaking: 16 January 1957
- Opened: 16 December 1962
- Renovated: 2024-2026 with capacity 50,000

Tenants
- Colombo FC; Renown SC; Sri Lanka national rugby union team Sri Lanka national football team Colombo Lions

Sugathadasa Stadium is a multi-purpose stadium in Colombo, Sri Lanka. It is currently used for football, rugby union, and athletics. The stadium holds 25,000 people and has an on-site hotel.

== History ==
The concept of an outdoor sporting stadium was initially raised by V. A. Sugathadasa, the Mayor of Colombo (1956–57, 1963–65), the country's first Minister of Sports (1966–70) and Chairman of the National Olympic and Commonwealth Games Committee. Construction of the stadium commenced on 16 January 1957 and was completed on 16 December 1962. The stadium was named after Sugathadasa, as he donated the land it was built on.

In 1991, an indoor stadium was constructed on the site by the Mitsui Company for the 1991 South Asian Games, and was opened by President Ranasinghe Premadasa.

== Stadium usage ==
The 1991 and 2006 South Asian Games were held in Sugathadasa Stadium. It also hosted the majority of matches for the 2010 AFC Challenge Cup. The 2010 IIFA Awards took place here. In 2012, the stadium was home to the Elite Football League of India. In 2002 it hosted the Asian Athletics Championships.

== Track ==
The track was first laid in around 1989 and relaid again 1996. In 2002 Rekortan track was laid, which was then relaid in 2012 by the Ministry of Sports however the track failed within two years and currently Sri Lankan athletes were lacking an international track to practice for international meets. In 2017 the Minister of Sports, Dayasiri Jayasekara, announced the track would be relaid and was expected to open back to athletes in December 2017. The Sugathadasa Authority took actions to relay the Track again in 2018 and it was reopened to the athletes with IAAF Certified Track and Field Facilities.

Preceded by Bung Karno Stadium; Jakarta	Asian Athletics Championships; Venue; 2002	Succeeded by Rizal Memorial Stadium; Manila
