= New Young's SC =

New Youngs
- Ground: Sri Albert F. Peiries Stadium, Wennappuwa
- Capacity: 5,000
- League: Sri Lanka Super League
- 2021–22: 8th

New Youngs Sports Club is a Sri Lankan professional football club based in Wennappuwa. The club competes in the top division football league, the Sri Lanka Super League.

The club was established by Rohitha Fernando in Wennappuwa. In 1990, the club finished as champions of the third division. In 1994, they emerged as second division champions, a feat they repeated in 1996, which led to the team's promotion to the first division. In 2005, New Youngs SC reached the semi-final of the national FA Cup, where they were defeated 2–0 by Saunders.
