= Navy Sea Hawks FC =

Sri Lankan football club

Navy Sea Hawks
- Ground: Navy Ground
- Capacity: 1,000
- Chairman: Cmde Rohan Dissanayake
- Manager: Kenichi Yatsuhashi
- League: Sri Lanka Super League
- 2022: 2nd

Navy Sea Hawks Football Club is a Sri Lankan professional football club based in Welisara. They play in the highest football league of Sri Lanka, the Sri Lanka Super League. In 2018, Sri Lanka Navy SC was renamed to Navy Sea Hawks FC.

The team is under the patronage of the Sri Lanka Navy.

== Managers ==
- (Japan) Kenichi Yatsuhashi (January 2021–)
