= Sri Lanka Air Force Sports Club (football) =

Sri Lankan football club

Air Force
- Full name: Sri Lanka Air Force Sports Club
- Ground: Kelaniya Football Complex
- Capacity: 3,000
- Manager: K. Sampath Perera
- League: Sri Lanka Super League
- 2021–2022: 10th
Home colours	Away colours

Air Force Sports Club is a Sri Lankan professional football club based in Colombo, that competes in the country's top-tier competition Sri Lanka Super League. The team is under the patronage of the Sri Lanka Air Force.

== Honours ==
- Sri Lanka Football Premier League
  - Champions (1): 2013

== Performance in AFC competitions ==
- AFC President's Cup: 1 appearance

2014: Group Stage
