= Don Bosco SC =

Sri Lankan football club

Don Bosco
- Full name: Don Bosco Sports Club
- Ground: Don Bosco Ground
- Capacity: 1,000
- League: Dialog Champions League
Home colours	Away colours

Don Bosco Sports Club was a Sri Lankan football club located in Negombo.

== Honours ==
Sri Lankan Premier League: 1

- Winner: 2010.

== Performance in AFC competitions ==
- AFC President's Cup: 1 appearance

2011: 4° in Group Stage
