= Java Lane SC =

Sri Lankan football club

Java Lane
- Full name: Java Lane Sports Club Private Limited
- Nickname: The Reds – Pride of Slave Island
- Founded: 1925; 101 years ago (Java Lane FC)
- Ground: City League Football Complex, Colombo
- Capacity: 5,000
- Manager: Mohamed Ameen AJrin
- League: Sri Lanka Champions League
- 2022: Runners Up

Java Lane Sports Club (also known as Javalane) is a Sri Lankan professional football club based in Slave Island in Colombo. The club plays in the second-tier football league of Sri Lanka, the Sri Lanka Champions League.

== Honours ==
=== Domestic ===
League

- Sri Lanka division 1: 1

- 2012

Cups

- Silver cup: 2

- 2009, 2012

- Sri Lanka Gold Cup: 1

- 2012, 2013 (Finalist)

- Assad Salley Trophy: 1

- 2010
