= Renown SC =

Renown
- Full name: Renown Sports Club
- Founded: 1981; 45 years ago
- Ground: Sugathadasa Stadium
- Capacity: 25,000
- Chairman: Canute Peeris
- Manager: L. M. S. Rajendran
- League: Sri Lanka Super League

Renown Sports Club is a Sri Lankan professional football club based in Kotahena, Colombo. Founded in 1981 by the Peeris Brothers, the club currently competes in the Sri Lanka Super League.

== History ==
Renown SC was founded in 1981. The club emerged champions in the Sri Lanka Champions League four times in 1990, 1993, 1994 and 2009. They became the first Sri Lankan club to sign numerous Indian players for a single season, signing Shaji Varghese, Shibu Stellas and Shyam Simon (all from Kerala) in 2004. In 2004, Renown participated in the 110th IFA Shield in 2004, in Kolkata.

They appeared in the 2010 edition of AFC President's Cup, but could not proceeded to the knockout stages.

== Home ground ==
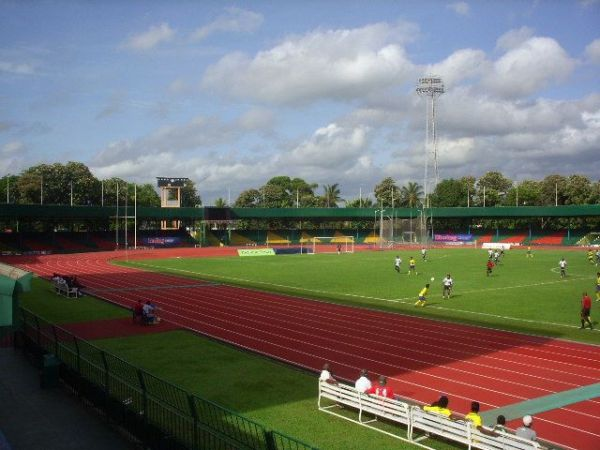
Sugathadasa Stadium, home of Renown SC

Renown uses Sugathadasa Stadium in Colombo, as its home ground. The stadium has a capacity of nearly 25,000 spectators.

== Achievements ==
Domestic tournaments

1982, 1987 : Silver Cup Champions.
1983 : Colombo League "C" Champions.
1983 : Y.A Sugathadasa Memorial Cup Champions.
1989, 1991 : Abdul Rahuman Gold Cup Champions.
1989 : Mayor's Cup Champions.
1989 : M.H. Mohamed Gold Cup Champions.
1989, 1991 : Jayantha Mallimarachchi Memorial Cup Champion
1989 : Vincent Peeris Memorial Cup Champion. (Renown SC Founder)
1991 : Police Invitation Cup Champion.
1992 : Sri Lanka School Invitation Cup Champions.
1993 : Lawrence Fernando Memorial Cup Champions. (Ratnam SC Founder)
1993 : Mahinda Aluvihara Memorial Cup Champions.
1994 : Ratnam Invitation Cup (Renown Vs Malaysia FA Champions).
1998 : Viven Gunawardana Memorial Trophy Champions.
2009 : Futsal Champions. 2009 : Dialog Champion League Champion.
2012 : Dialog Champion League. Runners up.
2015 : Dialog Champion League. Runners up.
2016 : Dialog Champion League. Runners up.
2017 : Dialog Champion League. Runners up.

- Sri Lanka Football Premier League: 4
  - Winners: 1990, 1993, 1994, 2009
- Sri Lanka FA Cup: 6
  - Winners: 1986–87, 1988–89, 1989–90, 1993–94, 1994–95, 2002–03
  - Runners-up: 1983–84, 1984–85, 1985–86, 1995–96, 1998–99, 2003–04
- Colombo League Gold Cup Champions: 3
  - Winners: 1989, 1990, 2003.
- POMIS Cup: 1
  - Winners: 1987

== Honours and records ==
=== International ===
- POMIS Cup (Maldives): 4 appearances

Champions 1987, 1988, 1990, 1999

=== Continental ===
- AFC President's Cup: 1 appearance

2010: 4th (group stage)

=== Domestic ===
- Ratnam Invitation Cup

Champions 1994

=== Records ===
- AIFF Vittal Trophy (India): 1 appearance
- IFA Shield (India): 1 appearance

== See also ==
- List of football clubs in Sri Lanka
