= Saunders SC =

Sri Lankan football club

Saunders
- Full name: Saunders Sports Club
- Founded: 1918; 108 years ago
- Ground: Kelaniya Football Complex; Sugathadasa Stadium
- Chairman: Mustapha Kaiz
- League: Sri Lanka Champions League
Home colours	Away colours

Saunders Sports Club is a Sri Lankan professional football club based in the Pettah district of Colombo. They play in second tier league, Sri Lanka Champions League.

== Achievements ==
- Sri Lankan Premier League: 12
  - Winner: 1985, 1986, 1987, 1989, 1991, 1992, 1996, 1997, 1998–99, 2000–01, 2001–02, 2004–05
- Sri Lanka FA Cup: 16
  - Winner: 1949, 1952, 1954, 1955, 1960, 1963, 1964, 1982, 1983–84, 1984–85, 1987–88, 1991–92, 1992–93, 1996–97, 1998–99, 2000–01

== Performance in AFC competitions ==
- Asian Club Championship: 7 appearances

1985: First Round
1986–87: Second Round
1988–89: First Round
1995–96: First Round
1997–98: First Round
1998–99: Second Round
2001–02: Second Round / Withdrew

- AFC Champions League

2002–03: Qualifying Round
