= Sri Lanka Police SC (football) =

Association football club based in Colombo, Sri Lanka

Sri Lanka Police
- Full name: Sri Lanka Police Sports Club
- Short name: SPFC
- Founded: 1897
- Ground: Police Ground, Colombo
- Capacity: 1,000
- League: Sri Lanka Champions League
| Home colours | Away colours |

Sri Lanka Police Sports Club is a Sri Lankan professional football club based in Colombo. They play in the second tier football league of Sri Lanka, the Sri Lanka Champions League. The team is under the patronage of the Sri Lanka Police.

== Continental record ==
| Season | Competition | Round | Opponent | Home | Away | Aggregate |
|---|---|---|---|---|---|---|
| 2021 | AFC Cup | Preliminary round 1 | Nepal Army Club | 5–1 | | |
