= Blue Star SC =

Sri Lankan football club

Blue Star
- Full name: Blue Star Sports Club
- Nickname: Blue Army
- Founded: 1978; 48 years ago
- Ground: Kalutara Stadium
- Capacity: 15,000
- Chairman: Mohamed Mohideen Mohamed Rizwan
- Manager: Banda Samarakoon
- League: Sri Lanka Super League
- 2022–23: Champions
Home colours	Away colours

Blue Star Sports Club is a Sri Lankan professional football club based in Kalutara. The club competes in the Sri Lanka Super League, the top flight of Sri Lankan football league system.

== History ==
Blue Star SC was founded in 1978. On 5 April 2022, Blue Star appeared in the 2022 AFC Cup qualifying play-off match against Machhindra of Nepal, at the Dasharath Rangasala Stadium and clinched a victory of 2–1.

== Achievements ==
- Bristol League Division III
  - Champions: 1996–97
  - Champions: 1998–99
- Sri Lankan Premier League: 2
  - Champions: 2004, 2021
  - Runners-up: 2007
  - Semi-finals: 2008
- AFC President's Cup
  - Semi-finalist 3rd Place: 2005
- Dialog Champion of Champions Trophy
  - Runners-up: 2003–04
  - Champions: 2004–2005
  - Runners-up: 2007
  - Quarter-finals: 2013
- Cargills FA Cup
  - Runners-up: 2013
  - Runners-up: 2014
  - Semi-finals: 2015
  - Third place: 2018

== Players ==
As of 02 June 2024

Note: Flags indicate national team as defined under FIFA eligibility rules; some limited exceptions apply. Players may hold more than one non-FIFA nationality.

No.	Pos.	Nation	Player
1	GK	SRI	Mohamed Ahamed
2	DF	SRI	Mohamed Rinas
3	DF	SRI	Thuwan Azeez
4	DF	SRI	Fahir Nilafdeen
5	MF	SRI	Tharmakulanathan Kajakopan
6	MF	SRI	Mohamed Sahlan
7	FW	SRI	Lahiru Tharaka Silva
8	FW	SRI	Basith Ameer
9	MF	CIV	Beidy Coulibaly
10	MF	SRI	Fasal Naizer
11	MF	SRI	Mohamed Ammar
12	FW	SRI	Mohamed Ihsan
13	GK	SRI	Mohamed Mursith
14	DF	SRI	Mohamed Arshadh
15	DF	SRI	Isaac Addevu
16	DF	SRI	Daniel Mecgrath
17	FW	GUI	Mouhamed Traore

No.	Pos.	Nation	Player
18	DF	SRI	Mohamed Munfik
19	FW	GHA	Evans Asante
20	DF	SRI	Mohamed Rifkan
21	FW	SRI	Chalana Pramantha
22	FW	SRI	Charidu Sampath
23	DF	SRI	Tharindu Erange (Captain)
24	FW	SRI	Mohamed Risan
25	GK	SRI	Kaveesh Lakpriya Fernando
30	MF	GHA	Prince Boadu
99	DF	NGA	Jerry Ombebe

== Team management ==
Position	Name
Head coach	Mohammed Hamza
