= Tempita Vihara =

Type of Buddhist house in Sri Lanka

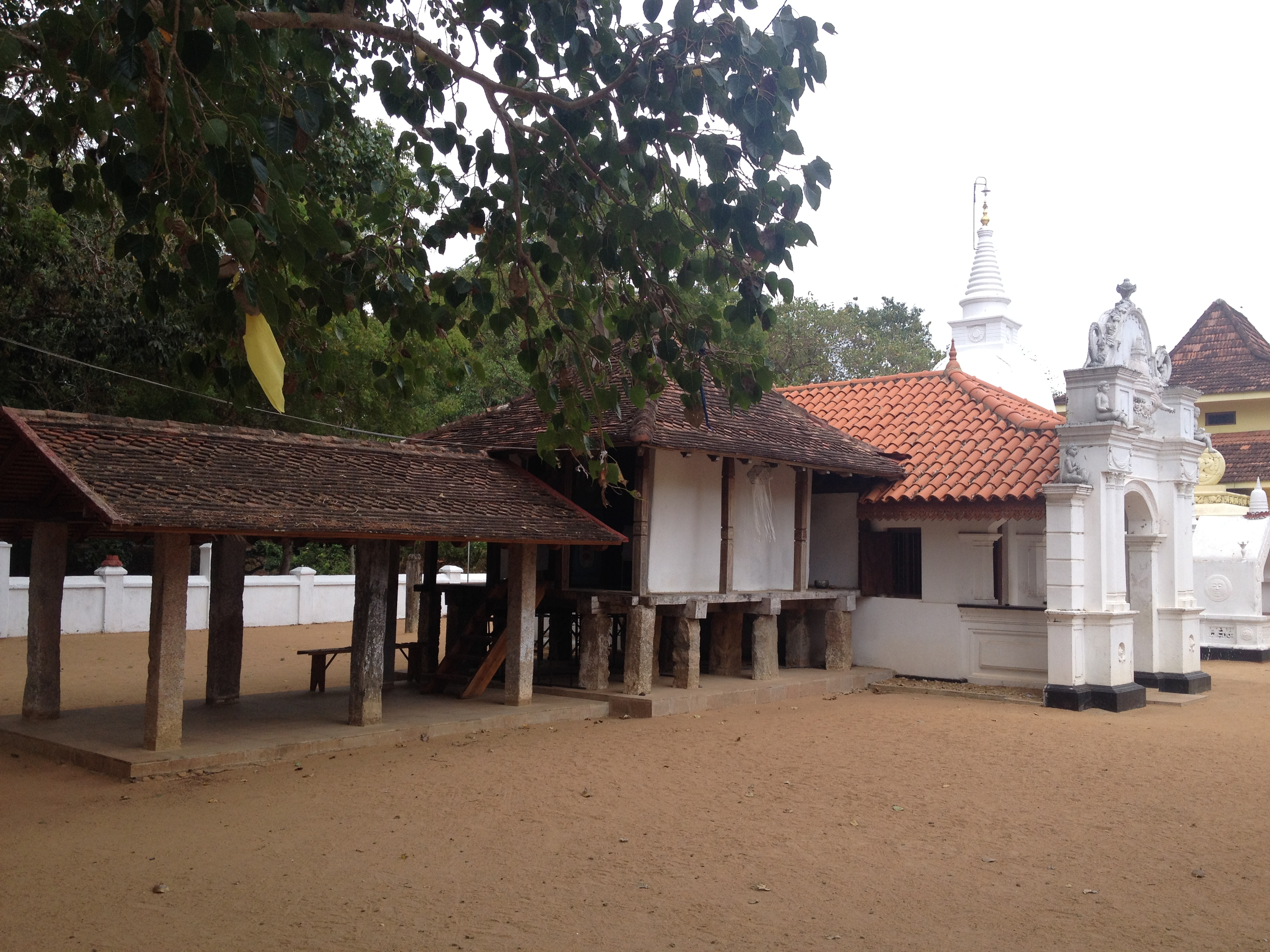
The Tempita building at Panduwasnuwara Raja Maha Vihara

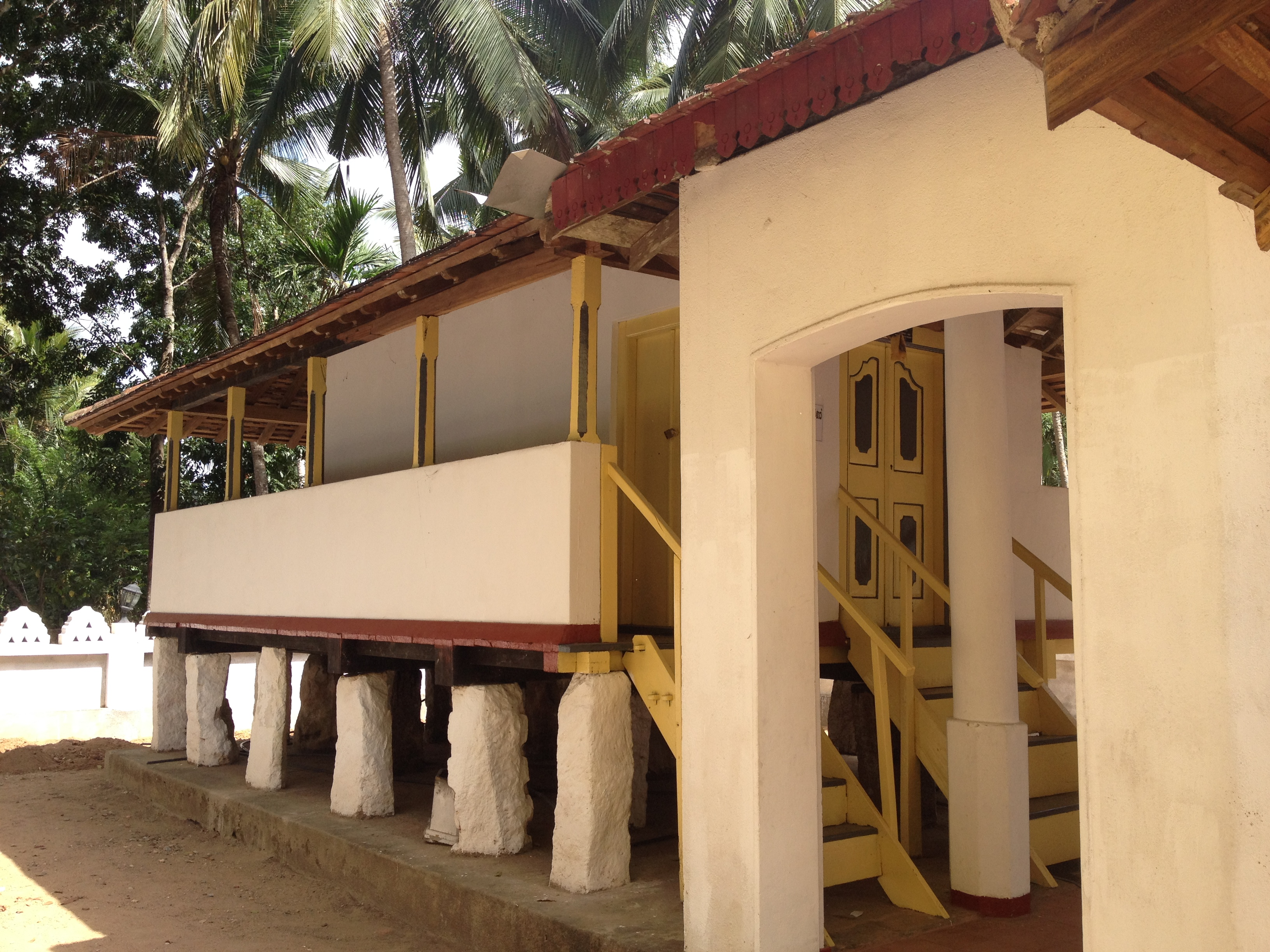
The Tempita image house at Yatawatte Purana Vihara

Tempita Vihara (Sinhala: ටැම්පිට විහාර) is a unique type of image house found in some Buddhist temples in Sri Lanka. With an inimitable architectural design, Tempita Viharas were a popular aspect of many Buddhist temples during the 17th to 19th centuries. Construction of Tempita Viharas in or after the 20th century has been not recorded. More than two hundred Tempita Viharas have been identified in Sri Lanka to date. Most of the shrines are found in North Western, Sabaragamuwa, Central and Western provinces.

Medawala Tempita Vihara in Kandy is considered the first accounted Tempita Vihara in Sri Lanka. According to the Medawala copper plaque, it was a two-storied shrine during the 14th century and was renovated as a Tempita Vihara by Kirti Sri Rajasinha (1747–1781) in 1755. Minuwangamuwa Tempita Vihara in Kegalle is believed to be the last Tempita Vihara in the island built on 2 May 1886.

Besides the Buddhist temples, a few Ambalamas and Devalayas have been identified in Sri Lanka as Tempita buildings. These structures are also built on raised stone pillars or rock boulders but have minor differences in their architectural design. Awariyawala Ambalama in Gampaha, Panawitiya Ambalama in Kurunegala and Halpe Pattini Devalaya in Ella are three examples of them.

== The structure ==
Perched on raised stone pillars or stumps, Tempita Viharas possess wooden platforms and wattle walls supporting a timber-framed roof. Usually, pillars are in an exposed state and not more than three or four feet in height. However, the pillars used in some temples such as Dodamthale Raja Maha Vihara in Mawanella and Ambulugala Raja Maha Vihara are about six feet in height. Wattle walls make the main enclosed shrine room containing the Buddha statues made of Limestones or timber. Inner walls are usually decorated with varies murals and paintings of the Kandyan period. The roofs are two-pitched and covered with flat clay tiles. Some Tempita Viharas have narrow verandas circulating the main enclosed space.

== Secondary feature constructions ==
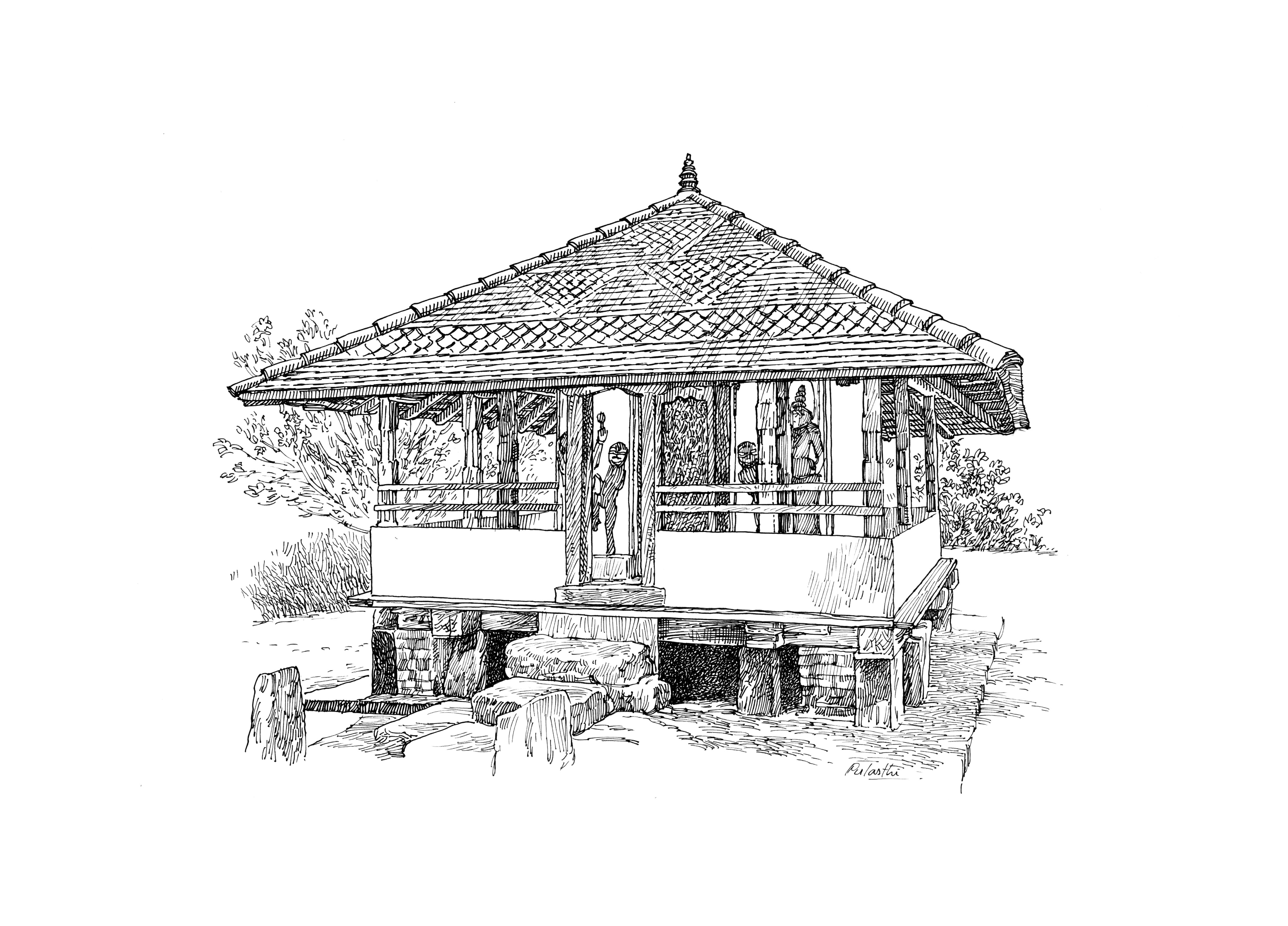
Bulnawa - Located in North Western Province. It has unique architectural features as a Tempita Vihara.

Over time, the function of the tempita vihara evolved, with additional features being integrated into the structure. Apart from the Ihala Kadigamuwa Pushparama Tempita Viharaya which gained recognition as the Tempita Pothgula (library) and the Saddarma Poth Gabadava (Saddarma Book Store), since the main need for the construction of all the others was an image house; other features were added to their utilities at a higher point of cultural temple centric development.

There is a wall surrounding the high-pillared ground floor of the tempita vihara which embeds the pillars. This being a construction of a later period, it suggests that the ground floor had been made use of as a bana maduwa (sermon hall) and a pohoya seema (Chapter house). Doragamuwa and Diyasunnata are two such examples.

The other is the digge (dancing/audience hall) or hewisi mandapa (drummers' hall) built towards the front of the tempita vihara and joined to the front slope of the roof. While this feature is evident in the majority of the tempita viharas, its structural enhancements include arches, wooden pillars and the presence and absence of short walls.

While Omalpe is a tempita vihara that includes both the aforesaid secondary features of construction, it also has the longest digge as well.

Moreover, a large-proportioned meditation hall has been constructed and joined with the roof of the tempita vihara's sermon hall by means of a storm gutter, thus creating a new structure. The entrance to the tempita vihara is through the sermon hall and when the twin doors are opened, the Buddha image within the tempita vihara is clearly visible to the audience in the sermon hall.

The tam or base pillars which are the identity of a tempita vihara being covered up during later renovations was a not-so-rare and rare experience during the research. When thus covered, in appearance it becomes a temple built on a normal foundation. Though through the features of the inner chambers views could be expressed under the assumption that it is a tempita vihara, the uniqueness of the construction has been lost in the process. The tempita vihara at Asmadala, Bodhimalkada and Udatalavinna, thus renovated in recent history are examples that could be proven.

While all these are structural features based upon the monastic and social necessities of the times, this paved the way for the main shapes of the tempita vihara to take on different shapes.

== Kirielle and Kadigamuwa ==
They are Kadigamuwa and Kirielle. At Kadigamuwa two tempita viharas have been constructed vertically during the past 100 years or so, at the Nadun Viharaya in Kirielle two have been constructed horizontally abutting each other. At the twin tempita viharas in Kirielle, the base pillars have been covered up during later renovations, while their structural appearances and paintings exhibit a Sabaragamuwa identity in a mixed feature of the Kandyan Era and the Southern traditions, thus forming a valuable creation of art. While the nearby new temple constructed horizontally exhibits the features of the cultural progress of the times; for a person studying the arts or socio-monastic progress, the first tempita vihara could be considered a special milestone in the study of the art of temple complexes from their inception to the present.

Kadigamuwa too exhibits the heritage of a similar series of constructions as two vertical tempita viharas and a new temple while they have been constructed in a row behind the ancient Bo tree. At Kirielle, all the openings face the Bo tree.

Various constructions have been carried out within Kadigamuwa with the direct and indirect sponsorships of King Valagamba to King Keerthi Sri Rajasinghe. Since it has been constructed alongside the road to the kingdom via Balana, it has undergone various transformations due to many socio-cultural factors. The entire temple complex stands proudly while featuring the core of all Sri Lankan arts.

The Nadun Viharaya was constructed under royal sponsorship in 1801 within a nindagama (villages gifted to officers for royal services) gifted by the Dumbara Maha Nilame (high-ranking officer in the services of royalty) on his written order on a small palm leaf umbrella. While history bears witness that this was gifted to Venerable Karandana Devarakkita Unnanse for the temple to be built, it is said that this nindagama is 8,305 acres in extent. While it is no secret that the nindagama became a treasury of wealth due to the presence of graphite and rubber, the significance of this nindagama could be realized from the study of these troika of temples under the Nadun Viharaya.

These contemporarily built temples are similar while being constructed as the first tempita vaharaya, the second tempita viharaya and the new temple. These two temples constructed alongside the ancient road to the kingdom from the South of Sri Lanka geographically belong to Sabaragamuwa and the Central Provinces. Hence, for over a century, this troika of temples has carried the artistic features unique to each region and these have been properly established within structurally similar tempita viharas.

The architectural features of these temples reflect the socio-economic conditions and the patronage they received, showcasing the influences of different historical periods. While the same viharaya undergoing timely modifications is a common experience, this image house which is outside of this added living data towards a new direction for this research.

== Soldara Vihara (Storied Temples) ==
This could be called a unique set encountered during the research into tempita viharas. The Mahalloluwa and Dodantale classified and identified as tempita viharas by the Department of Archaeology (Gamini Wijesuriya) also belong to this set. The literal term soldara vihara ('storied temples') is used in the architectural glossary of Mawanella and Kegalle. This research includes an exploration of these temples based on that classification.

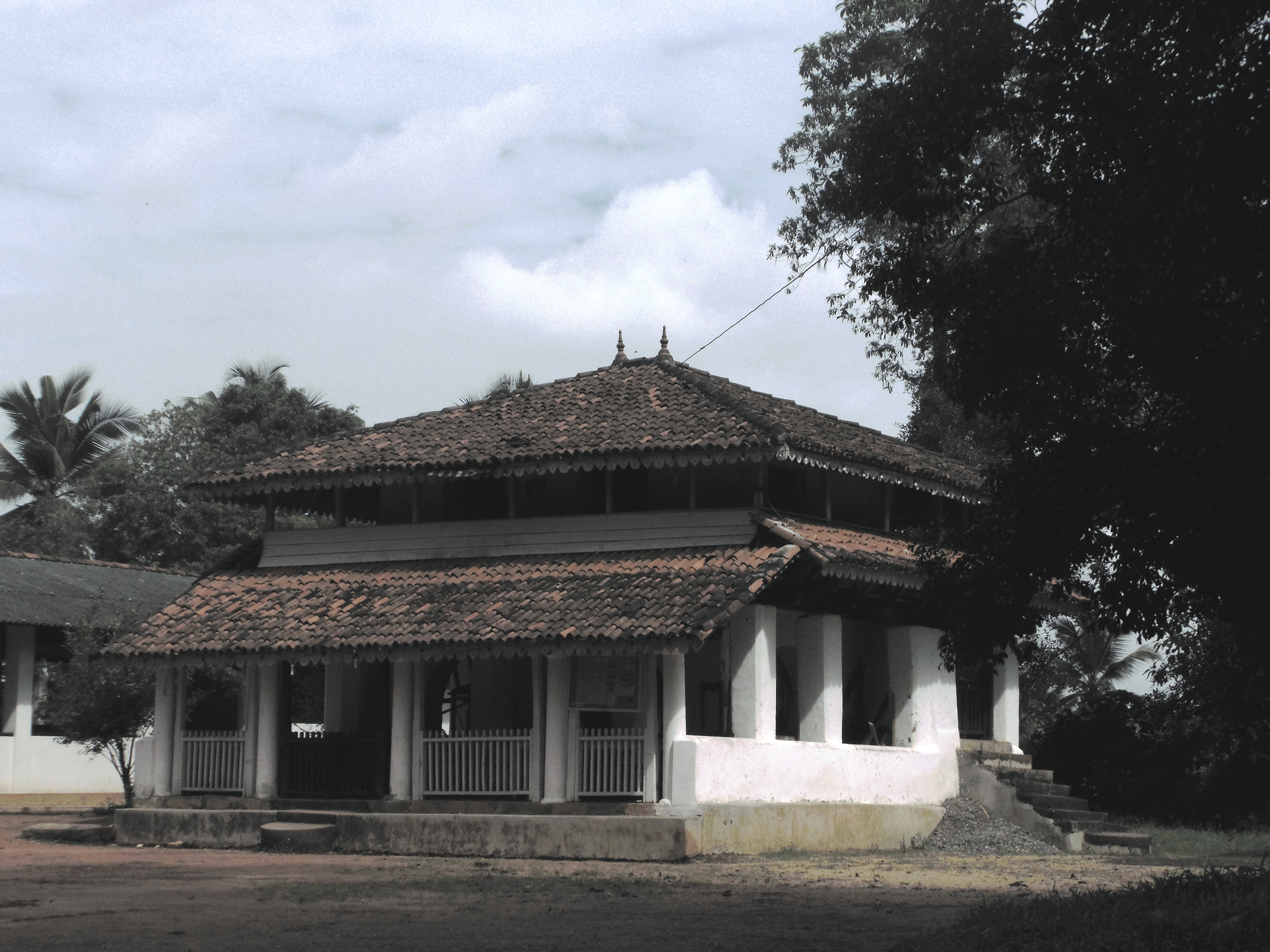
The Soldara Viharaya, Callthe Mahalloluva Sri Saddharmaramaya located in Western Province.

Soldara viharas are seven in number. They are the Mahalloluwa, Attanagoda, Dodantale, Gallengolla, Keraminiya, Keselwatta and Ketapitiya.

Among these, except Ketapitiya, all the others are located on the right side of the Kandy Road (while travelling from Colombo to Kandy) and in close proximity to the old Kandy Road connecting Sabaragamuwa. Poththapitiya, with its unique architectural creations amidst the Ketapitiya Raja Maha Viharaya (ancient temple) and several other temples is located at the Ketapitiya junction along the Kadugannawa road. The soldara vihara constructed within a special geographic region with special architectural features is a wonderful architectural creation.

These temples are characterized by their high wooden floors on arches, offering spacious and rectangular designs typical of the period. While the upper floor with the Buddha image is also spacious, it has a four-faceted roof of the Kandyan Era or a twin-skewed four-faceted roof.

While storied houses of nobles within the social systems of the times are found island-wide, they are a common component of architectural creations. The name soldara vihara (storied temples) may have come into public practice since these temples had been built with their ground and upper floors occupying large spaces similar to that of a house. Dodantale is often considered one of the earliest among the soldara viharas, while Mahalloluwa and Gallengolla are recognized as more recent constructions.

== Kadawaragedara Sulugulu Thambita viharaya ==
The tampita viharaya at the Sulugulu Rajamaha Viharaya has been built during the Kandyan revival of this temple. A tampita viharaya is a structure built on a wooden platform that rests on a number of stone stumps usually three to four feet high. The roof is held by a structure built of timber and the walls are generally made of wattle and daub. Walls inside the image chamber are more or less always covered in murals drawn mainly in Kandyan style.

The tampita viharaya at the Sulugulu Rajamaha Viharaya is built on fairly high granite pillars about five feet high. A circumambulating path is built around the image house protected by a half-height wall. The path is narrow except at the front. Wooden pillars around the path hold the roof tiled with flat clay tiles typical of roofs built during the Kandyan kingdom. The roof has been extended at the front at the same angle to create a mandapa. A wooden stairway leads to the platform where the image house is built. Both the inner and the outer walls of the image house are covered with murals. This tampita viharaya has been restored by the Department of Archaeology in 2014.

== Temples ==
Province	District	Temples
Central Province	Kandy	
Central Province	Matale	Narangolla Purana Vihara, Ambanganga Korale; Udasgiriya Bodhi Malu Vihara, Yatawatta; Welangahawatta Sri Dhamajothiyarama Vihara, Rattota
Central Province	Nuwara Eliya	
North Central Province	Anuradhapura	Abarali Vihara, Hinguruwewa; Habarana Purana Tempita Vihara, Habarana; Kada Hatha Vihara, Rambewa; Namalpura Sri Vishuddharama Vihara, Madawala; Sandagala Vihara, Korassagalle; Sri Dalada Vihara, Mahakumbukgollewa; Sujatharama Vihara, Puhulewewa
North Central Province	Polonnaruwa	
North Western Province	Puttalam	Bodhi Rukkarama Vihara, Anamaduwa; Nagarama Purana Vihara, Mahawewa; Sri Sudarsanarama Vihara, Karambewa
North Western Province	Kurunegala	Ahugoda Purana Vihara, Polgahawela; Bihalpola Purana Tempita Vihara, Kuliyapitiya; Bingiriya Raja Maha Vihara, Kiniyama; Bodhirukkharama Purana Pothgul Vihara, Talawattegedara; Budumuththawa Purana Tempita Vihara, Nikaweratiya; Bulnewa Raja Maha Vihara, Polpithigama; Dandagamuwa Sri Sudharmarama Purana Vihara, Kuliyapitiya; Devapita Vihara, Wataraka; Digampitiya Vihara, Mawathagama; Dorabawila Vihara, Dorabawila; Edandawala Raja Maha Vihara, Maspotha; Galayaya Sri Sudharamarama Purana Vihara, Pannala; Ganagamuwa Poorvarama Vihara, Kuliyapitiya East; Inguruwatta Tempita Vihara, Arambepola; Kadawalagedara Tempita Vihara, Kuliyapitiya East; Kahatawilagedara Purana Tempita Vihara, Katupotha; Katupitiya Tempita Vihara, Kurunegala; Kohongaha Gedara Sri Bodhidramaramaya Vihara, Kuliyapitiya; Kolambagama Purana Tempita Vihara, Katupotha; Konduruwapola Raja Maha Vihara, Kuliyapitiya East; Kudagalgamuwa Tempita Vihara, Maspotha Purana Vihara, Kurunegala; Mayurawathi Purana Vihara, Polgahawela; Medagodawatte Uyanegama Sri Nagabodhi Purana Vihara, Ketawelegedara; Nakkawatta Purana Tempita Vihara, Kuliyapitiya East; Paramaulla Vihara, Alawwa; Panduwasnuwara Raja Maha Vihara, Panduwasnuwara; Sri Bodhirukkharama Vihara, Gammatha; Sri Nagarukkharama Vihara, Katupotha; Sri Purwarama Vihara, Nikaweratiya; Sri Pushparama Vihara, Horanepola; Sri Rathanapalarama Vihara, Polpithigama; Sri Sugatharama Vihara, Kalawana; Sri Sunandharama Vihara, Wathuwaththa; Sri Swarna Bimbarama Vihara, Kotuwewatta; Sri Vijayasundararama Raja Maha Vihara, Sapugaskanda; Sunandarama Purana Vihara, Talammehera; Swarnabimbarama Purana Vihara, Panduwasnuwara; Tampitagoda Vihara, Galgamuwa; Thambugala Purana Tempita Vihara, Thorayaya; Udubadagama Vihara, Malagamuwa; Yataththawela Bodhiwansarama Purana Vihara, Pannala
Sabaragamuwa Province	Kegalle	Asmadala Vihara, Aranayaka; Atthanagoda Tempita Vihara, Mawanella; Bodhirukkarama Purana Vihara, Kempitikanda; Burunnewa Tempita Vihara Warakapola; Deniyatenna Vihara, Talgaspitiya; Eraminiya Gammana Tempita Purana Vihara, Mawanella; Gondiwela Tempita Vihara, Mawanella; Hingula Raja Maha Vihara, Hingula; Jeewana Raja Maha Vihara, Galigamuwa; Kappatipola Tampita Vihara, Mawanella; Kariyagama Raja Maha Vihara, Aranayaka; Keerthi Sri Rajasingha Raja Maha Vihara, Rambukkana; Levangama Tempita Vihara, Talawatta; Mahawatta Purana Vihara, Warakapola; Mannagoda Tempita Vihara, Mawanella; Mayurapada Vihara, Moragammana; Mediliyagama Raja Maha Vihara, Mediliyagama; Nawagamuwa Raja Maha Vihara, Rambukkana; Podape Purana Vihara, Aranayaka; Sri Danthapaya Raja Maha Vihara, Ambulugala; Sri Sudharmarama Tempita Vihara, Muwapitiya; Sri Sudassanarama Vihara, Arambegama; Udanwita Raja Maha Vihara, Rambukkana; Udugama Purana Raja Maha Vihara, Rambukkana
Sabaragamuwa Province	Ratnapura	Dapane Sri Jayasundararama Raja Maha Vihara, Kolonna; Elugala Purana Tempita Vihara, Imbulpe; Walalgoda Purana Tempita Vihara, Embilipitiya
Southern Province	Galle	
Southern Province	Hambantota	Seehala Purana Vihara, Weeraketiya
Southern Province	Matara	Thorawita Raja Maha Vihara, Hakmana; Vilayaya Purana Raja Maha Vihara, Dampahala
Western Province	Colombo	
Western Province	Gampaha	Ganewatta Vihara; Kiritarama Vihara, Mottunna; Kshestrarama Purana Vihara, Hapuwalana; Pothgul Vihara, Atupothdeniya; Saddharamathilakarama Vihara, Metikotamulla; Sri Jinendrarama Vihara, Raddalgoda; Sri Jinendrarama Vihara, Warapalana; Sri Saddharmarama Vihara, Mahalloluwa; Sri Sumangalarama Purana vihara, Delgawatta, Anuragoda; Yatawatte Purana Vihara, Pahalagama
Western Province	Kalutara	Prathiraja Piriven Vihara, Kekunadola
Uva Province	Badulla	
Uva Province	Monaragala	Hathporuwa Vihara, Buttala; Kokunnewa Vihara, Bibile; Kotasara Piyangala Raja Maha Vihara, Bibile; Pulinathalarama Vihara, Thanamalvila
