= Super Sun SC =

Sri Lankan football club

Super Sun
- Full name: Super Sun Sports Club
- Founded: 1984; 42 years ago
- Ground: Zahira College, Dharga Town
- Capacity: 1,000

Super Sun Sports Club is a Sri Lankan professional football club based in Beruwala in the Kalutara District. The team plays in Sri Lanka Champions League, the second division of domestic football.

== League participations ==
- Sri Lanka Champions League: 2012–
- Kit Premier League Division I: 2011–12
- Kit Premier League Division II: –2011

== Stadium ==
Currently the team plays at the 1,000 capacity Zahira College Ground.

== See also ==
- 2010–11 Sri Lanka Football Division II
- 2013 Sri Lanka Football Premier League
