= Chinthaka =

Chinthaka is a given name. Notable people with the name include:

- Chinthaka Edirimanne (born 1968), Sri Lankan cricketer
- Chinthaka Jayasinghe (born 1978), Sri Lankan cricketer
- Chinthaka Jayawickrama (born 1984), Sri Lankan cricketer
- Chinthaka Perera (born 1985), Sri Lankan cricketer
- Chinthaka Mayadunne (born 1975), Sri Lankan politician
