= Zahira College =

Zahira College is the name of several schools in Sri Lanka including:

- Zahira College, Colombo
- Zahira College, Gampola
- Zahira College, Hambantota
- Zahira College, Kalmunai
- Zahira College, Matale
- Zahira College, Mawanella
- Zahira College, Dharga Town
