= Mayadunne (surname) =

Mayadunne is a surname. Notable people with the surname include:

- Chinthaka Mayadunne (born 1975), Sri Lankan politician
- Sarath Chandrasiri Mayadunne, Sri Lankan civil servant
- Shantha Mayadunne (1951–2019), Sri Lankan chef

== See also ==
- Mayadunne of Sitawaka, founder and ruler of Sitawaka
