= Jayawickrama =

Jayawickrama is a Sinhalese surname. Notable people with the surname include:

- Chinthaka Jayawickrama, Sri Lankan cricketer
- Gamini Jayawickrama Perera, Sri Lankan politician
- Montague Jayawickrama, Sri Lankan politician
- U. S. Jayawickrama, Sri Lankan physician
