= Zavia =

Zavia can refer to:

- Zavia Mayne, Jamaican politician
- Zavia SC, Sri Lankan football club
- Zawiya, Libya, also spelled "Zavia", a city
