= Sheikh Hassan Bin Osman Magdoomy =

Sri Lankan Sufi mystic

- செய்கு ஹஸன் இப்னு உஸ்மான் அல்-மக்தூமி
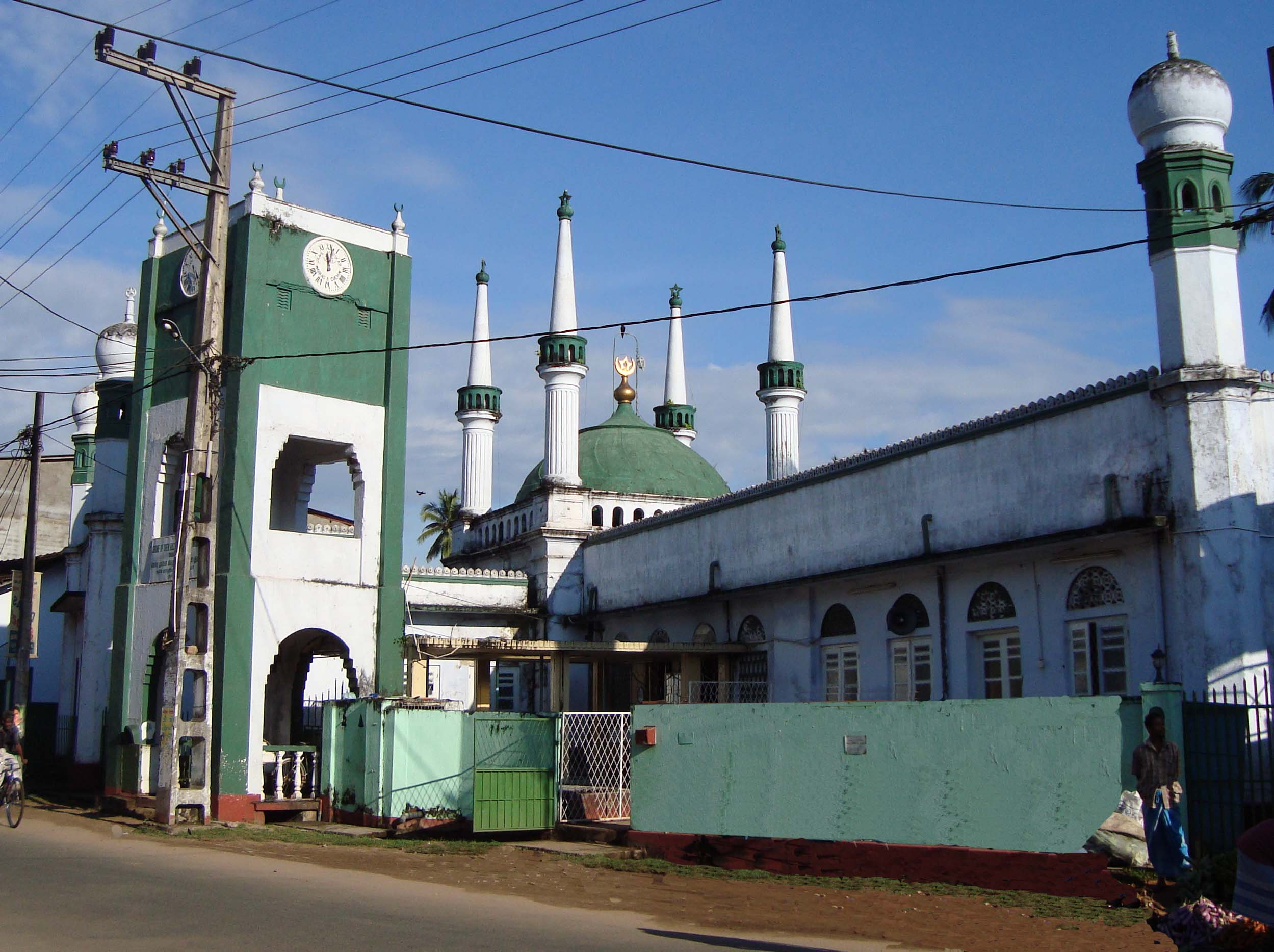
- Sheikh Hassan Bin Osman Magdoomy(RA) Shrine

Personal life
- Born: 1785 CE (1200 AH) Thalapitiya, Galle, Sri Lanka
- Died: 1866 CE (1283 AH) Dharga Town, Sri Lanka
- Resting place: Dharga Town, Sri Lanka
- Era: 19th Century
- Main interest(s): Fiqh, Sufism, Tafsir, Hadees

Religious life
- Religion: Islam
- Denomination: Sunni (Sufism)
- Jurisprudence: Shafi
- Tariqa: Qadiriyya
- Creed: Ashari

Sheikh Hassan Bin Osman Magdoomy (1785-1866) (Tamil: செய்கு ஹஸன் இப்னு உஸ்மான் அல்-மக்தூமி) is the first Moorish Saint of Sri Lanka, about whom chronological data are available. Hassan was one of the eminent walis in the country and was known as Alim Sahib Appa among his mureeds (disciples) in Sri Lanka.

== Early life ==
Hassan born in Sholai, Thalapitiya, Galle in the year of 1785 AD (Hijri 1200), the son of Usman Makdoomy Ibn Fareed of Aluthgama and Fathima Siddeeka, the only daughter of Katheeb Sheikh Mohamed, Galle. Hassan is a direct descendant of Abu Bakr. Hassan's mother died nine days after his birth and he was cared for by his aunt following his mother's death.

== Education ==
Hassan had his early education in Quran reading and the fundamentals of religion in a Madrasa. He went Kayalpattinam, India for further education, where he studied under Shaykuna Lebbai Alim (d.1240 AD/1824AD). He studied Tafsir, Hadees, Fiqh and other fundamentals of religion under Shaykuna Lebbai Alim (also called Shaykuna Pulavar).

== Later life ==
Hassan returned to Sri Lanka after finishing his higher education. He was appointed as first Katheeb at the Galle Fort Mosque. He lived 42 years in Galle. He spent his later life in Hambantota, Trincomalee, Kandy, Ganetanne, Maggona and finally Aluthgama. Hassan received the Kalifath of Seyed Sheik Ibmi Mohammadul Jiffry (Jiffry Thangal) from Seyed Ahmed Ibn Abdullah Bafaki Rahimahullah. Hassan had only one son who died at a young age. Hassan loved his two nephews with whom he spent a major part of his life. They are Mohammed Lebbe and Sheik Abdul Cader, better known as Kaliyar Fakeen Lebbe and Sheik Hasan had bestowed his full power pertaining to Khilafath on him. He attended sainthood at a very young age. He was a great scholar in Theology having studied extensively at the Al Azhar University in Cairo.

== Death ==
Hassan died on 22 May 1866 (7 Muharrum 1283 AH) at age 80 and was buried in Darga Town, Aluthgama.

== Masheik Feast ==
Hassan initiated 'Masheik Feast' (Masheik Kanduri) in 1862. Kanduri (Feast) actually means public religious recitations on Muhammad and the Sufi Saints including the offering of food. The Masheik Feast held in every year. After Hassan's death, the Masheik Feast has been held at the Shrine of Sheikh Hassan. The 150th Annual Masheik Feast was held on 26 September 2012.
