= 2010–11 Sri Lanka Football Division II =

12 teams participated in this tournament.

== Teams ==
Group A	Group B)
Eastern Youth SC - Kalunei (Ampara)	Brilliant SC - Kalunei (Ampara)
Hyline SC - Dangolla (Kandy)	Jetliners SC - Gampaha
Maya SC - Kegalla	Mawanella United SC
New Stars SC - Panadura	Ratmalana United SC
Old Mezedonians SC - Kadana	Soccor Fans SC - Colombo
Super Sun SC - Beruwala	Super Beach SC - Kalutara

== Semi-finalists ==
Brilliant SC Vs New Star SC
Hyline SC Vs Super Beach SC
