= Ruwan Gopura =

Sri Lankan university professor

Ruwan Chandra Gopura
- රුවන් චන්ද්‍ර ගෝපුර
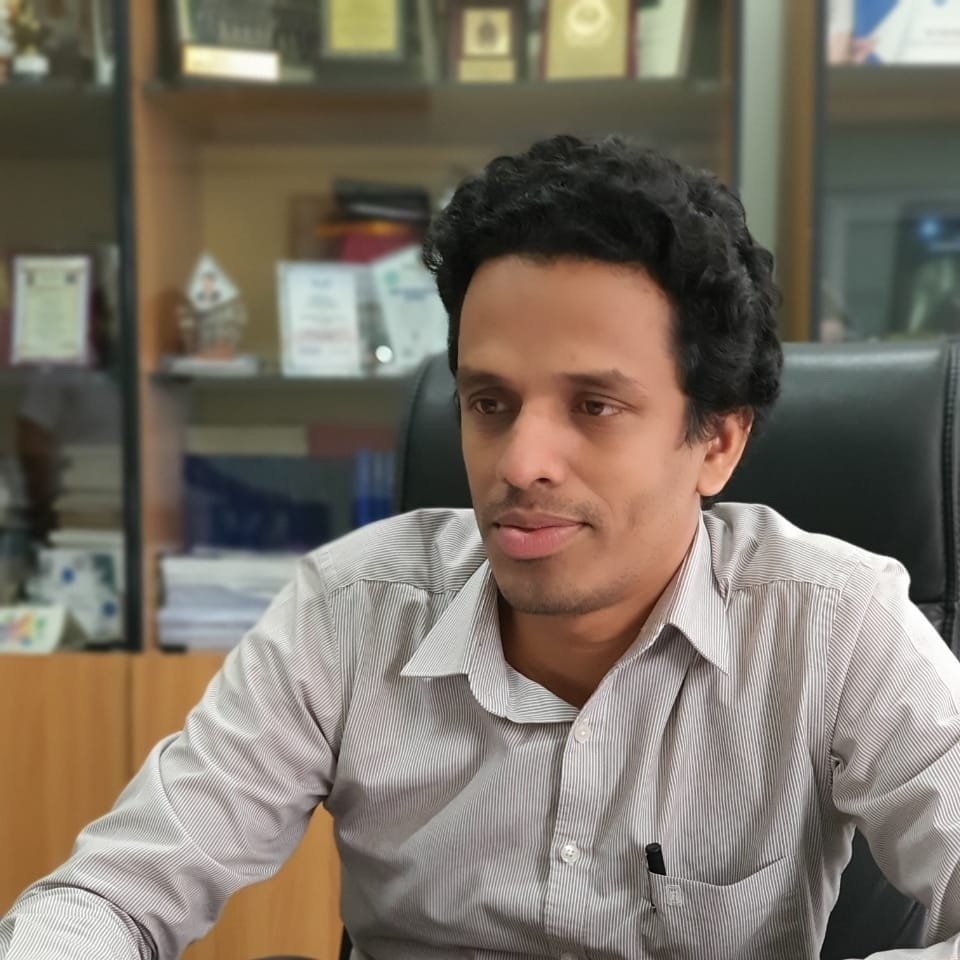
- Born: Damunupola, Kegalle, Sri Lanka
- Occupation: Professor
- Spouse: Nirosha Agalawatta
- Children: 2
- Relatives: Sumith Chandra Gopura

Academic background
- Education: Saga University (PhD); University of Moratuwa (BSc & MS) Pinnawala Central College
- Doctoral advisor: Prof. Kazuo Kiguchi

Academic work
- Discipline: Mechanical Engineering
- Sub-discipline: Robotics
- Institutions: University of Moratuwa, Sri Lanka Saga University, Japan
- Website: https://uom.lk/staff/Gopura.RARC

Ruwan Chandra Gopura is a professor attached to the Department of Mechanical Engineering, University of Moratuwa, Sri Lanka and a former Head, Department of Mechanical Engineering, University of Moratuwa (March 2017 – January 2020). He was the Founding Head, Department of Medical Technology, Faculty of Medicine, University of Moratuwa (February 2021 – January 2024). He is the former Director/Research of University of Moratuwa (February 2021 – January 2024). Prof. Gopura is currently the Dean, Faculty of Graduate Studies at the same university. He was the chairperson of IEEE Sri Lanka Section in 2020. He was the chair of IEEE Robotics and Automation Society Sri Lanka Section Chapter from February 2017 to February 2020. He was the secretary of the same Chapter from 2013 to 2017. Gopura was the secretary of IEEE Sri Lanka Section in 2015. He is a senior member of the Institute of Electrical and Electronics Engineers (IEEE) and IEEE Robotics and Automation Society. Ruwan Gopura is a founding member of Sri Lanka Robotic Meetups. He is an editorial board member of reputed international journals. He won the IEEE Sri Lanka Section, "Most Outstanding Volunteer Award 2022 (Member category)" at the IEEE Sri Lanka section awards held on 17 September 2022. He has been appointed as a Distinguished Lecturer of Engineering, Medicine and Biology Society of IEEE (IEEE EMBS) for the term 2025-2026.

== Early life and education ==
Gopura was born in Damunupola, Kegalle, Sri Lanka and grew up in Kegalle in a family of six including his parents and his three brothers. He attended Damunupola Kanishta Vidyalaya and Kegalu Vidyalaya for his primary education and then attended Pinnawala Central College for his secondary education.

Ruwan Gopura entered the University of Moratuwa for his university education in 2000. He graduated from University of Moratuwa with a BSc Engineering (honours) degree in 2004 and he obtained his Master of Engineering in Manufacturing Systems Engineering from the same university. He obtained his PhD degree in Robotics and Intelligent Systems from Saga University, Japan in 2009.

== Career ==
Prior to join University of Moratuwa, Sri Lanka as Senior Lecturer in May 2010 Gopura worked as a research assistant at the Department of Mechanical Engineering, University of Moratuwa, Sri Lanka in March 2004 and then as a junior lecturer at the Department of Textile and Clothing Technology, University of Moratuwa. After completing the PhD in 2009 he worked as Post-doctoral Researcher, Saga University, Japan. Gopura carried out his doctoral and post doctoral research on Bionics and assistive robotics. He developed the first ever robotic prosthetic arm in Sri Lanka with his research team in 2016 and the first ever lower extremity exoskeleton robot in 2017. He has received award of excellence, Outstanding Research Performance of University of Moratuwa 11th consecutive occasions from 2012 to 2022. The assistive robotics research that he is carrying out has won several competitive research grants and several awards in the international levels.
