= Zahira =

Zahira may refer to:

- Zahira El Ghabi, Moroccan FIDE master (2005)
- Zahira Zahir, American barber and cosmetologist
- Zahira Kazim, the main character of the 2016 film A Wedding (Noces)

== See also ==
- Zahira College (disambiguation)
