= Yatawatte Purana Vihara =

- යටවත්තේ පුරාණ විහාරය
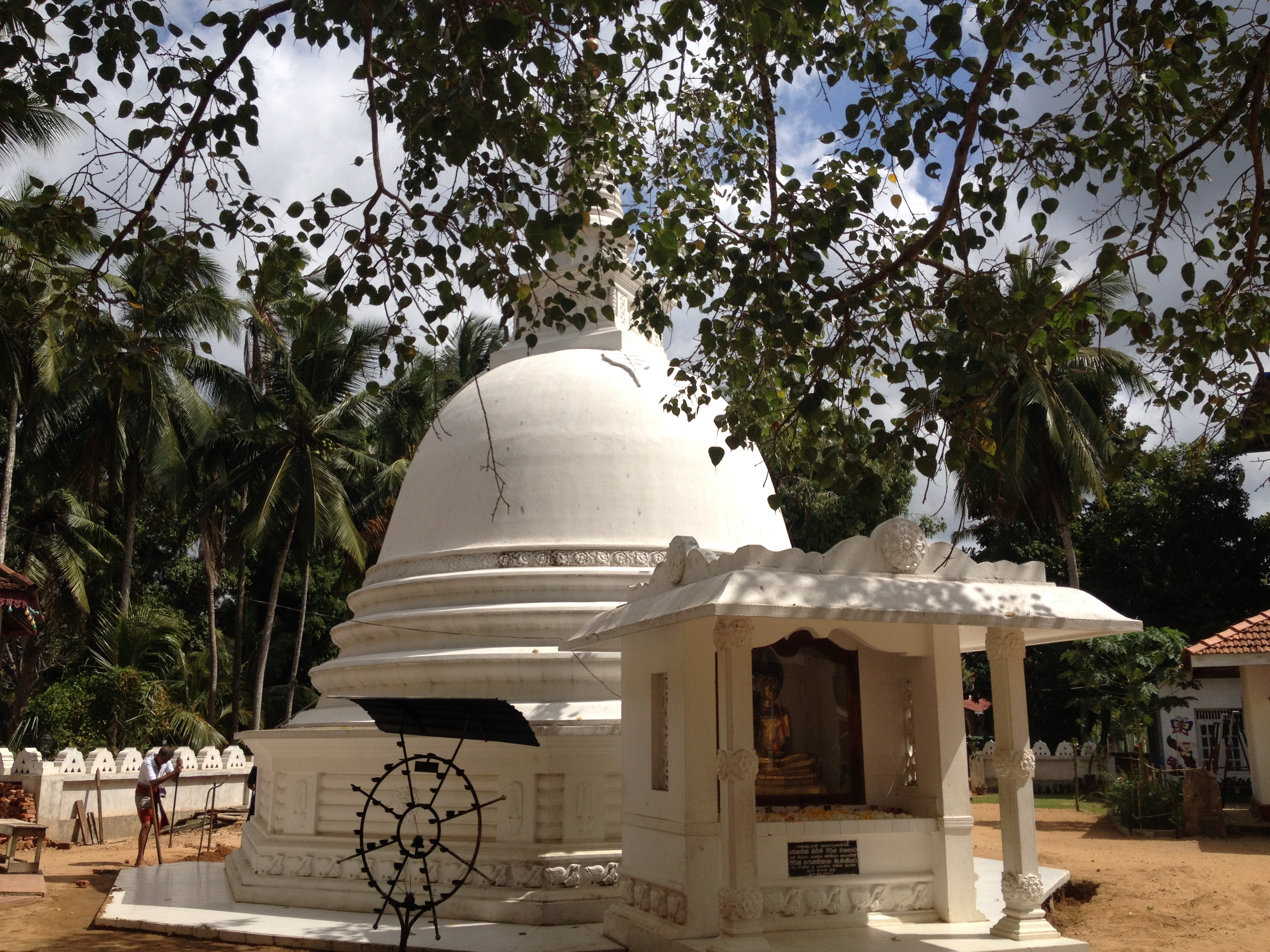
- The Stupa at Vihara

Religion
- Affiliation: Buddhism
- District: Gampaha
- Province: Western Province

Location
- Location: Pahalagama, Gampaha, Sri Lanka
- Interactive map of Yatawatte Purana Vihara
- Coordinates: 07°05′20.1″N 79°59′10.6″E

Architecture
- Type: Buddhist Temple
- Style: Tempita Vihara

Yatawatte Purana Vihara (Sinhalaː යටවත්තේ පුරාණ විහාරය) (or Vidyaravinda Maha Pirivena) is an ancient Buddhist temple in Gampaha, Sri Lanka. It lies on Gampaha – Pahalagama main road, approximately 1 km (0.62 mi) away from the Gampaha town. The temple has been formally recognised by the Government as an archaeological site in Sri Lanka. The designation was declared on 15 April 2016 under the government Gazette number 1963.

== The temple ==
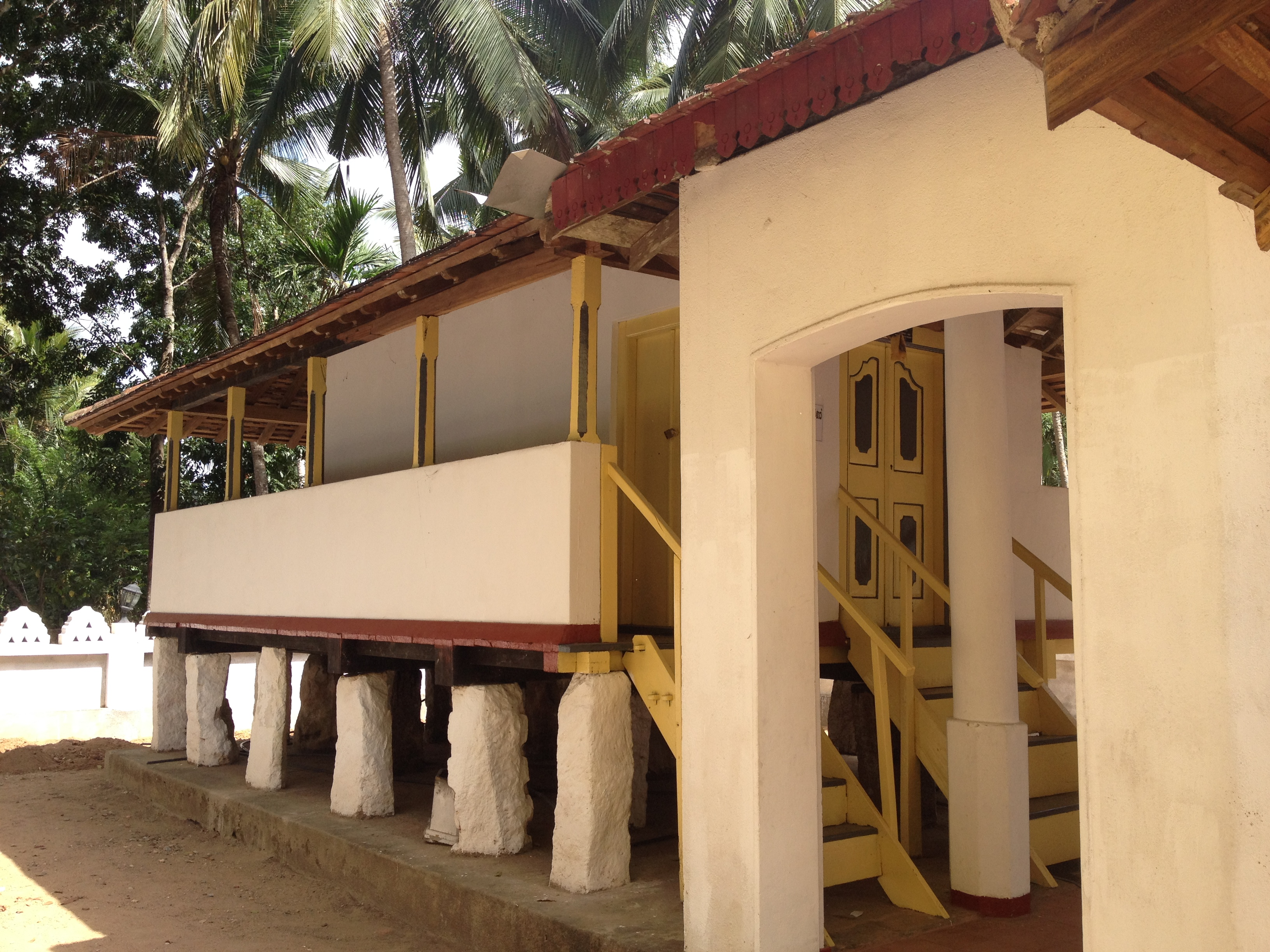
The Tempita image house

Although the original construction date is not known, it is believed that the temple's history is going back to the period of King Parakramabahu VI. The Tempita house of the Vihara is an archaeological protected monument which is believed to be constructed or renovated on 21 March 1861 as the date is indicated on its entrance door. Tempita houses are buildings constructed on granite pillars which were popular in Sri Lanka during the 17th–19th centuries.
