= Dodanthale Raja Maha Vihara =

Dodanthale Raja Maha Vihara (English: Dodanthale Great Royal Temple)
- දොඩන්තලේ රජ මහා විහාරය
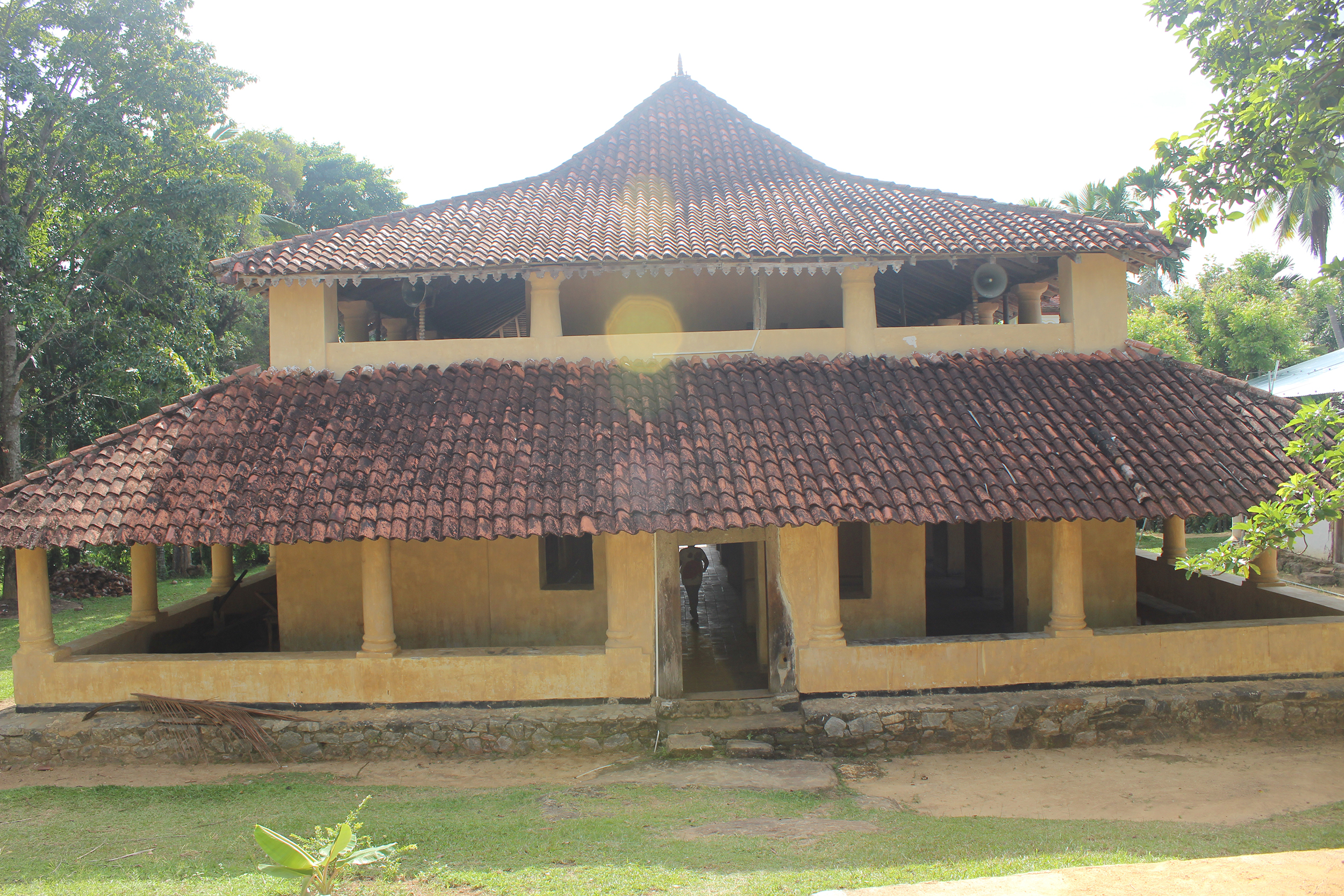
- The image house

Religion
- Affiliation: Buddhism
- District: Kegalle
- Province: Sabaragamuwa Province

Location
- Location: Mawanella, Sri Lanka
- Interactive map of Dodanthale Raja Maha Vihara (English: Dodanthale Great Royal Temple)
- Coordinates: 07°13′47.7″N 80°25′45.9″E

Architecture
- Type: Buddhist Temple
- Style: Tempita Vihara
- Completed: 1748

Dodanthale Raja Maha Vihara (Sinhala: දොඩන්තලේ රජ මහා විහාරය, English: Dodanthale Great Royal Temple, also known as Sri Seneviratne Uposatha Raja Maha Vihara) is an historic Buddhist temple situated in Mawanella, Kegalle District, Sri Lanka. The temple is located about 4 km (2.5 mi) away from the Mawanella town. The temple has been formally recognised by the Government as an archaeological site in Sri Lanka. The designation was declared on 10 November 1978 under the government Gazette number 10. As part of the name of several temples, Raja Maha Vihara means in English: Great Royal Temple or Great Royal Monastery. It designates ancient Sri Lankan Buddhist temples that historically received royal patronage and/or donations from the king.

== History ==
The temple at Dodantale was first designed by chief Adikaram Molligoda to serve as a royal palace. It is said that the ground floor of this palace was intended to use as royal audience hall while the first floor as living quarters of royalty and the third for the tooth relic of Buddha. The location had natural protection from all sides, with hills to the north and south and a moat on the eastern and western sides. The walls of the structure are 1.4 m (4.6 ft) thick. Prior to the third storey being constructed Molligoda converted the building to a Buddhist Vihara. The building was completed in 1832.

The building is 15.3 m (50 ft) long and 12.3 m (40 ft) wide, with twelve entrance steps up to the hall. The ground floor of the vihara is used as a preaching hall, with two wooden staircases leading up to the second floor. The roof is tiled with Koku Ulu tiles.

== Image house ==
The temple is well known for its image house, built in Tempita Vihara tradition. Usually the pillars used for the many of other Tempita buildings found in the country are about 0.9–1.23 m (3.0–4.0 ft) in height. However the pillars used in Dodantale temple are about 1.84 m (6.0 ft) in height and has been built as a two storied structure where the ground floor serve as the preaching hall (Bana Maduwa) and the upper floor as the image house.

There are three Buddha statues in the image house at the upper floor which is surrounded by a veranda. All the statues are curved out of timber. The inner walls and the ceiling of the image house are decorated with Kandyan period murals. Among them a portrait of the Kirti Sri Rajasinha (1747–1782) wearing the Kurulu Padakkama (Bird pendant) has been identified. Kurulu Padakkama is a jewel made for the Adikaram Molligoda which has a Sinhalese inscription on the reverse. Also an old wide-mouthed large earthen vessel called Pathra, used to hold water or to receive offerings from worshipers, has been preserved in the Vihara premises today.
