= Wanduradeniya =

Wanduradeniya වඳුරාදෙනිය
- Village
- Location within Sri Lanka
- Coordinates: 7°11′15″N 80°19′25″E
- Country: Sri Lanka
- Province: Sabaragamuwa Province
- District: Kegalle District
- Elevation: 180 m (590 ft)

Population (2012)
  - Total: 820
- Time zone: UTC+05:30 (Sri Lanka Standard Time Zone)

Wanduradeniya is a village located in Galigamuwa A.G.A Division in Kegalle District, Sri Lanka.

== Geography ==
Wanduradeniya is located between Atugoda (north) and Harigala (south). Kadugamuwa is west of Wanduradeniya. Atugoda Ela is the closest water resource of the Village. It is 14 kilometres (8.7 mi) from Kegalle Town.

== Administration ==
68-B Renapana Grama Niladhari division administer this area.

== Demographics ==
Only Sinhalese people live in the village. They follow Buddhism. Wanduradeniya Bo-Maluwa is the only temple.

== Education ==
Wanduradeniya Primary School is the only school. It opened in the 1950s as a secondary school. It later became a primary school, with about 40 students.

== Transport ==
Avissawella - Kegalle Highway is 5 km away. Bulathkohupitiya - Kegalle Highway is 5 km away.

== See also ==
- Kegalle
- Sabaragamuwa
- Galigamuwa
