= Kegalu Vidyalaya =

- Entrance Gate of the School

Location
- Vidyalaya Road; Kegalle, Sabaragamuwa Province, 71000; Sri Lanka
- 7°15′4″N 80°20′58″E

Information
- Other name: Kegalle Vidyalaya
- Former name: Kegalle Higher Buddhist English School
- Type: National School
- Motto: Pali: යාදිසං වපතෙ - තාදිසං හරතෙ (As We Sow - So We Reap)
- Religious affiliation: Buddhist
- Established: 14 February 1942; 84 years ago
- Founder: D. M. Senevirathne
- Principal: A. L. P. Amarasuriya
- Staff: 180
- Grades: 1 to 13
- Gender: Boys
- Age range: 6 to 19
- Enrollment: 3,750
- Language: Sinhala and English
- Colours: Blue and gold
- Song: Sinhala: විජයතු කෑගලු විදුහල් මාතා (Vijayathu Kegalu Viduhal Maatha)
- Publication: Keshara
- Alumni: Old Vidyalions
- Website: kegaluvidyalaya.lk

Kegalu Vidyalaya is a boys' school in Kegalle, Sri Lanka. It was founded on 14 February 1942 and is a Government national school, providing primary and secondary education through 13 grades. It is the largest boys' School in Kegalle.

== History ==
The former Mudliar of Kegalle, D. M. Senevirathne, took the initiative in establishing a school in Kegalle for teaching English on a Buddhist basis.

The foundation stone laying ceremony took place on 20 August 1937 and construction of the school was completed by February 1942. A notice was issued by the principal of Ananda College, L. H. Meththananda, stating that Kegalu Vidyalaya would open on 14 February 1942 as a branch of Ananda College. The first edition of the school newspaper was published that month as well. In 2004 it was converted into a national school by President Chandrika Kumaratunga.

== Houses ==
The students are divided into four houses:

- – Dharmapala
- – Gunananda
- – Jayathilaka
- – Olcott

The house names are derived from national heroes of Sri Lanka. The houses compete annually in games and sports to win an inter-house competition.

== Sports ==
=== Cricket ===
Kegalu Vidyalaya and St. Mary's College has been hosting an annual Big Match (Battle of the Gold) since 1960. It is said to be one of the oldest annual cricket match in Sri Lanka and is held annually in February or March as the official cricket team of both schools.

== Notable alumni ==
- Sumeda Ranasinghe : Sri Lankan Olympic field athlete (2016)
- Wiswa Warnapala : Member of Parliament, National List (2004-2010)
- Daya Sandagiri : Commander of the Navy (2000–2004)
- Ruwan Gopura : Dean, Faculty of Graduate Studies, University of Moratuwa (2024–to date), Head of Department of Mechanical Engineering (2017–2020), Department of Medical Technology University of Moratuwa (2021–2024)
- Sarath Chandrasiri Mayadunne : 36th Auditor General of Sri Lanka (2000–2006) and Member of Parliament - National List (2015)
