= Zavia SC =

Sri Lankan football club

- Full name: Zavia Sports Club
- Nickname: Zavia
- Founded: 1973; 53 years ago

Zavia Sports Club, commonly known as Zavia, is a Sri Lankan football club based in Dharga Town, Sri Lanka. The club was founded in 1973 by M.M. Ismail and his brothers, as a sports club in Dharga Town.
