= Al Hambra Maha Vidyalaya =

- අල් හම්රා මහා විද්‍යාලය அல் ஹம்ரா மஹா வித்யாலயம்

Location
- Fatha Hajiar Mawatha, Dharga Town, Western Province, 12090; Sri Lanka
- 6.4435°N 80.0107°E

Information
- Type: Government School
- Motto: Arabic: Man la adhaba lahu la ilma lahu (The one who has no manners has no knowledge)
- Established: 1896; 130 years ago
- School district: Kalutara
- School number: 0342270518
- Principal: Mrs. Fazliya Fassy
- Grades: 1–13 (Tamil and English Medium)
- Gender: Mixed School
- Age: From 6 years to 19 years
- Colours: Blue, Green, Maroon
- Alumni: Hambrians

WP/KL Al-Hambra Maha Vidyalaya (Sinhala: අල් හම්රා මහා විද්‍යාලය Tamil: அல் ஹம்ரா மஹா வித்யாலயம்) is a government school located in Dharga Town, Sri Lanka. Established in 1896, it is the oldest school in Dharga Town and serves as a major educational center for the community. The school currently provides education from Grade 1 to Grade 13 and is classified as a Type 1C school.

== History ==
In the year 1896 focusing on Dharga town a small school was started in the Beruwala Division of the Kalutara Zone in the Western Province of Sri Lanka. This school which has a history of 125 years is very proud to have produced well known scholars and intellectuals to this country as well as board. Presently the school has strength of 1538 students and 59 staff members. From grade 01 to 11 there are 4 parallel classes that are functioning. And the school also has the advance level section that consists of the Commerce and Arts Streams.

The scholarship, Ordinary Level and Advance Level exam results of this school has been on the increase and the number of students that are entering the universities has also developed. The school has been able to achieve many places in the Zonal, Divisional, National and International levels by ways of Sports, Literature and other Curricular Activities.

It is significant fact that the school has been able to achieve all these with a limited amount of resources. It has a decayed building, insufficient classrooms, a hall that consists of 7 classes, having to use the laboratory as a class etc. And it is amidst all these hardship that knowledge is imparted to these students. If the necessary resources and facilities are given we will be able to produce great results.

In the project ‘The nearest school is the best school’ the school was selected to the ‘A’ group and the ministry has prepared a future plan for the school. According to that plan to develop the school we need every person's co-operation. This school also has a devoted past pupils association. We wish all strength, power and good luck for this school in the area.

== Academics ==
Al Hambra Maha Vidyalaya provides education from Grade 1 to Grade 13, following the national education structure of Sri Lanka. The school system comprises primary education (Grades 1–5), junior secondary education (Grades 6–9), senior secondary education preparing students for the General Certificate of Education (G.C.E.) Ordinary Level (Grades 10–11), and collegiate level education leading to the G.C.E. Advanced Level examinations (Grades 12–13). Parallel classes are conducted up to Grade 11 to accommodate student enrolment.

The primary medium of instruction is Tamil, reflecting the linguistic background of the predominantly Tamil-speaking Muslim community in Dharga Town. Sinhala is taught as a second language, while English is offered both as a subject and, in selected instances, as a medium for specific subjects in accordance with national bilingual education policies.

The curriculum at primary and junior secondary levels includes core subjects such as Tamil language and literature, Mathematics, Environmental Studies, Islam, Social Studies, Science, Sinhala, and English. These subjects follow the national curriculum prescribed by the Ministry of Education of Sri Lanka.

At the Advanced Level, the school offers the following streams:

- Biological Sciences – including Biology, Chemistry, and Physics
- Physical Sciences – including Combined Mathematics, Chemistry, and Physics
- Commerce – including Accounting, Economics, and Business Studies
- Arts – including subjects such as Logic, Media and Communication Studies, History, Geography, and Political Science

Students sit for the G.C.E. Ordinary Level and G.C.E. Advanced Level examinations conducted by the Department of Examinations, Sri Lanka.

== Inter House Sportsmeet ==
Organizes students into three houses Alavi, Barie, and Mashoor. The house structure is intended to promote healthy competition, teamwork, and a sense of belonging among students. Inter-house activities include competitions in sports, academics, and the arts, contributing to overall school spirit.

The house system forms an integral part of school tradition and aims to encourage leadership, discipline, and community involvement. Each house functions as a sub-community within the school, with students earning points through participation and performance in various events. Annual awards and recognitions are used to acknowledge collective achievements and sustained participation.

== Extracurricular activities ==
Extracurricular activities form an important component of student life at the school, supporting holistic development beyond the formal curriculum. Sports represent a significant area of engagement, with students participating in football, athletics, and other school-level competitions.

Despite limited facilities, the school has recorded achievements at zonal and district levels. In August 2024, the under-16 football team won the Kalutara District championship in a knock-out tournament organized by the Beruwala Zonal Schools Sports Association, qualifying for provincial-level competition. Sporting achievements are commonly showcased during annual inter-house sports meets.

Infrastructure limitations have been identified in the school’s development planning, with proposals for upgraded playgrounds and the establishment of a dedicated sports complex to enhance athletic training and events.

== Past Principals ==
Given below is a list of Principals who served and their period of service

Name	From	To
Mr. Idroos	1924	1925
Mr. Zainudeen Marikkar	1925	1926
Mr. K.S.Rajasingham	1926	1929
Mr. T.A. Paul	1929	1937
Mr. I.L.M. Mashoor	1938	1942
Mr. M.A. Baari	1942	1959
Mr. M.S.M. Harees	1959	1960
Mr. I.L.M. Shuaib	1960	1962
Mr. A.Z. Omardeen	1962	1963
Mr. M.A. Wahid	1963	1964
Mr. Y.L.M. Abul Hassan (Salih)	1965	1966
Mr. M.M.A. Alavi	1966	1984
Mr. M.I.M. Kaleel	1984	1985
Mr. M.S.M. Bishrul Haafi	1985	1986
Mr. M.F.A. Shakoor	1986	1990
Mr. M.Z.M. Naeem	1990	2005
Mrs. A.W.S. Masaya	2005	2009
Mr. M.M.N. Nalri	2009	2020

== Current Administration ==
As of 2023, the principal is Mrs. Fazliya Fassy, who assumed office in 2020. The administration has overseen modernization initiatives, including the implementation of digital management systems to enhance administrative efficiency and data management.

The principal is supported by a vice principal, deputy principals, and sectional heads responsible for academic coordination, curriculum implementation, and daily administrative functions across primary and secondary divisions.

As a Type 1C school, the institution functions under the oversight of the Ministry of Education of Sri Lanka. The Past Pupils’ Association (Old Boys’ Association) contributes to school development initiatives, including infrastructure and technology-related projects.

== Notable alumini ==
Name	Notability	Reference
Mr. M.S.M. Nizam	Former Deputy Inspector General of Police (DIG)	

== Infrastructure ==
- Bakeer Markar Hall (Main Hall)
- Barrie Hall
- Prayer Halls
- Library
- Dental Clinic
