= Panduwasnuwara Raja Maha Vihara =

- පඬුවස්නුවර රජ මහා විහාරය
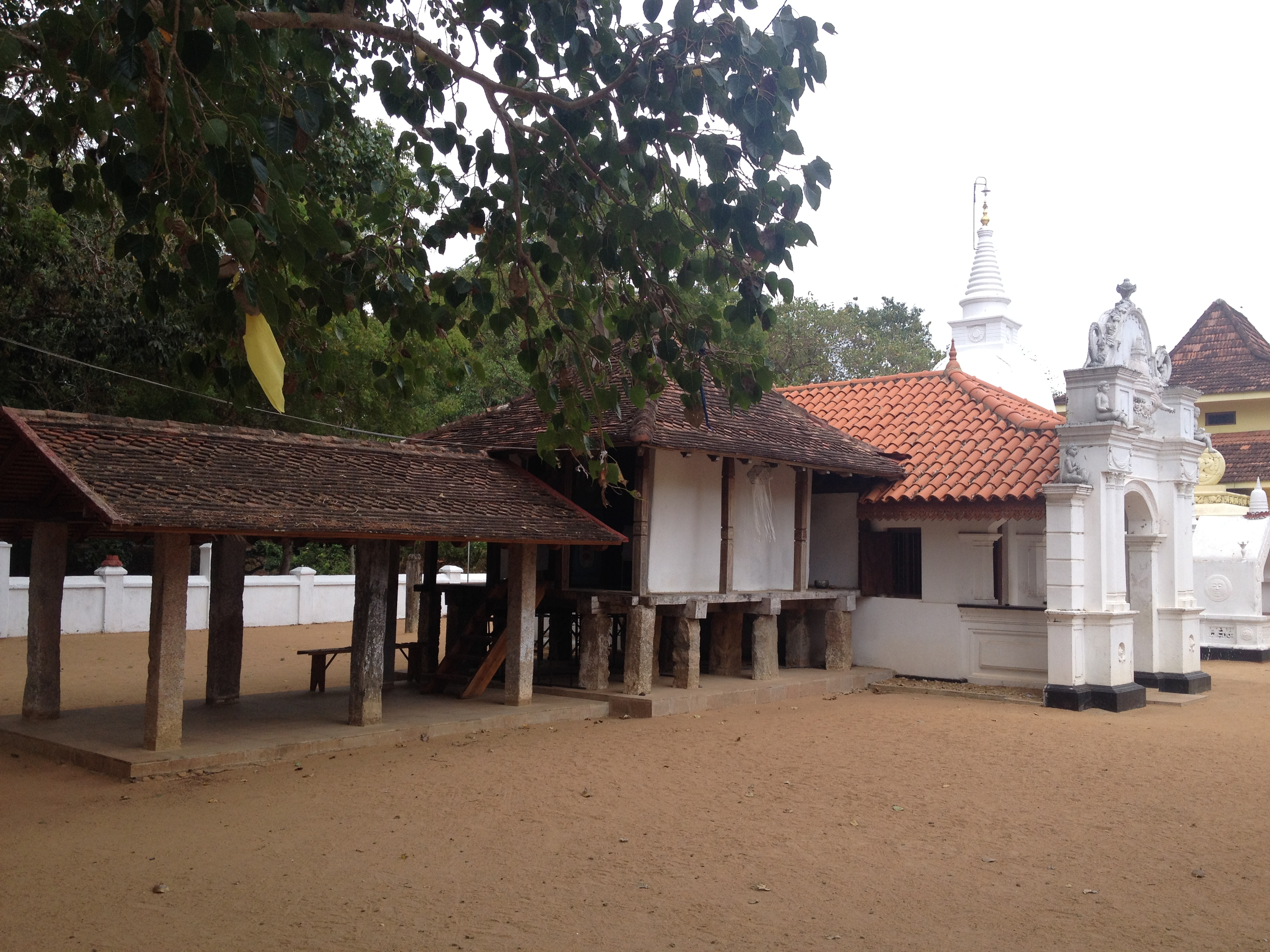
- The Tempita Vihara building

Religion
- Affiliation: Buddhism
- District: Kurunegala
- Province: North Western Province

Location
- Location: Panduwasnuwara, Sri Lanka
- Interactive map of Panduwasnuwara Raja Maha Vihara
- Coordinates: 07°35′50.3″N 80°06′30.8″E

Architecture
- Type: Buddhist Temple
- Style: Tempita Vihara

Panduwasnuwara Raja Maha Vihara (Sinhalaː පඬුවස්නුවර රජ මහා විහාරය) is an ancient Buddhist temple situated in Panduwasnuwara, Kurunegala District, Sri Lanka. The temple has been formally recognised by the Government as an archaeological site in Sri Lanka. The designation was declared on 13 March 1970 under the government Gazette number 14897.

== Vihara inscriptions ==
The history of Panduwasnuwara Vihara is believed to be dated back to the period of Anuradhapura Kingdom. Inscriptions belong to the eras of King Sena II, King Kashyapa IV and King Udaya II have been found from the land of Panduwasnuwara Vihara.

=== The pillar inscription near the Bodhi tree ===
Reign: Udaya II (887 - 898), Period: 9th century AD, Script: Medieval Sinhala, Language: Medieval Sinhala
Content: "The inscription mentions of an immunity grant made by the royal officers to the two villages named Nagala and Naranvita of the Kapugama District on the 10th day of waxing moon in the month of Bak during the 7th year of the reign of king Udaya II. The inscription includes a decree preventing royal officers on state duty entering the villages"

== Gallery ==
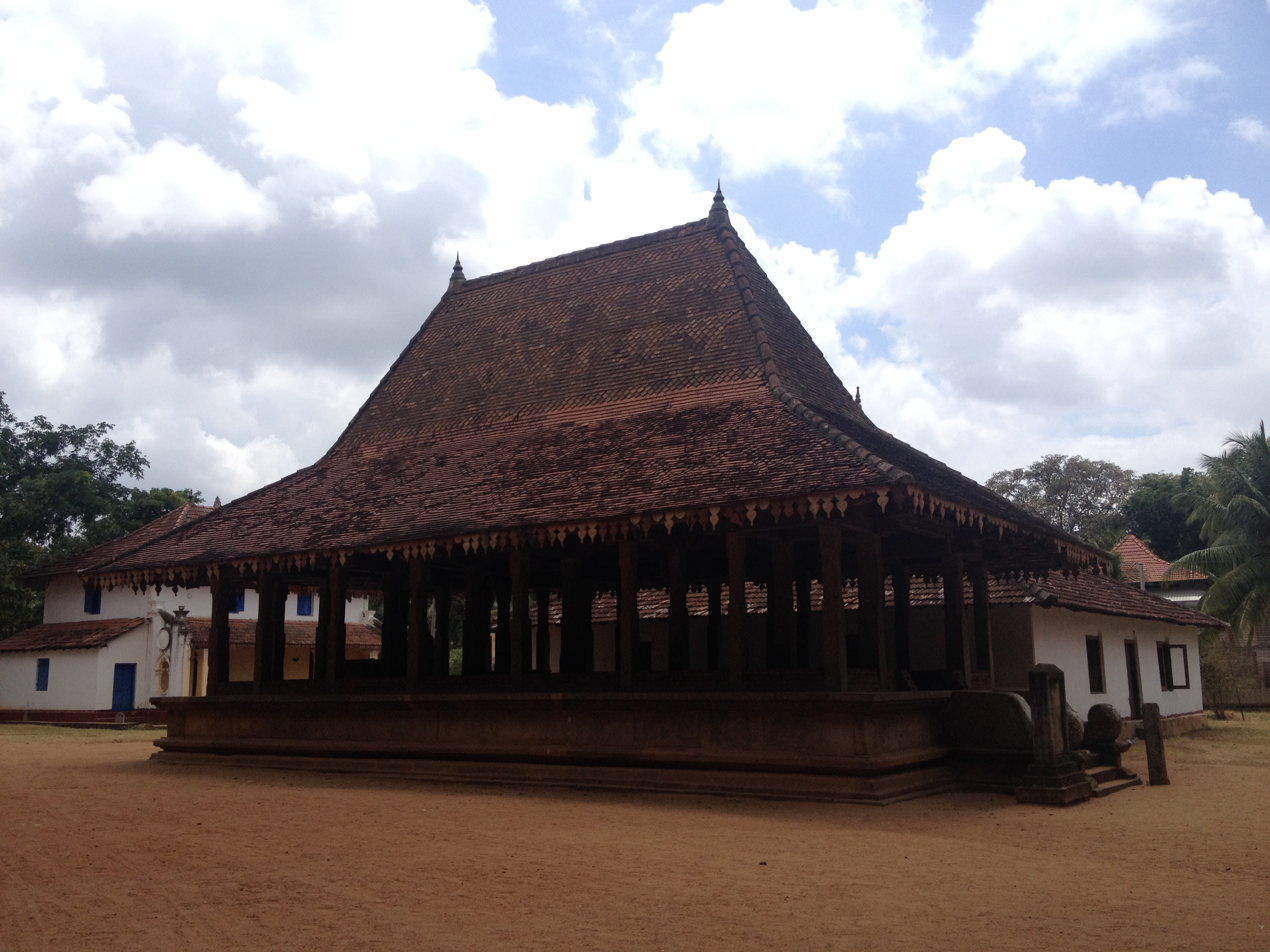
The temple of the Tooth

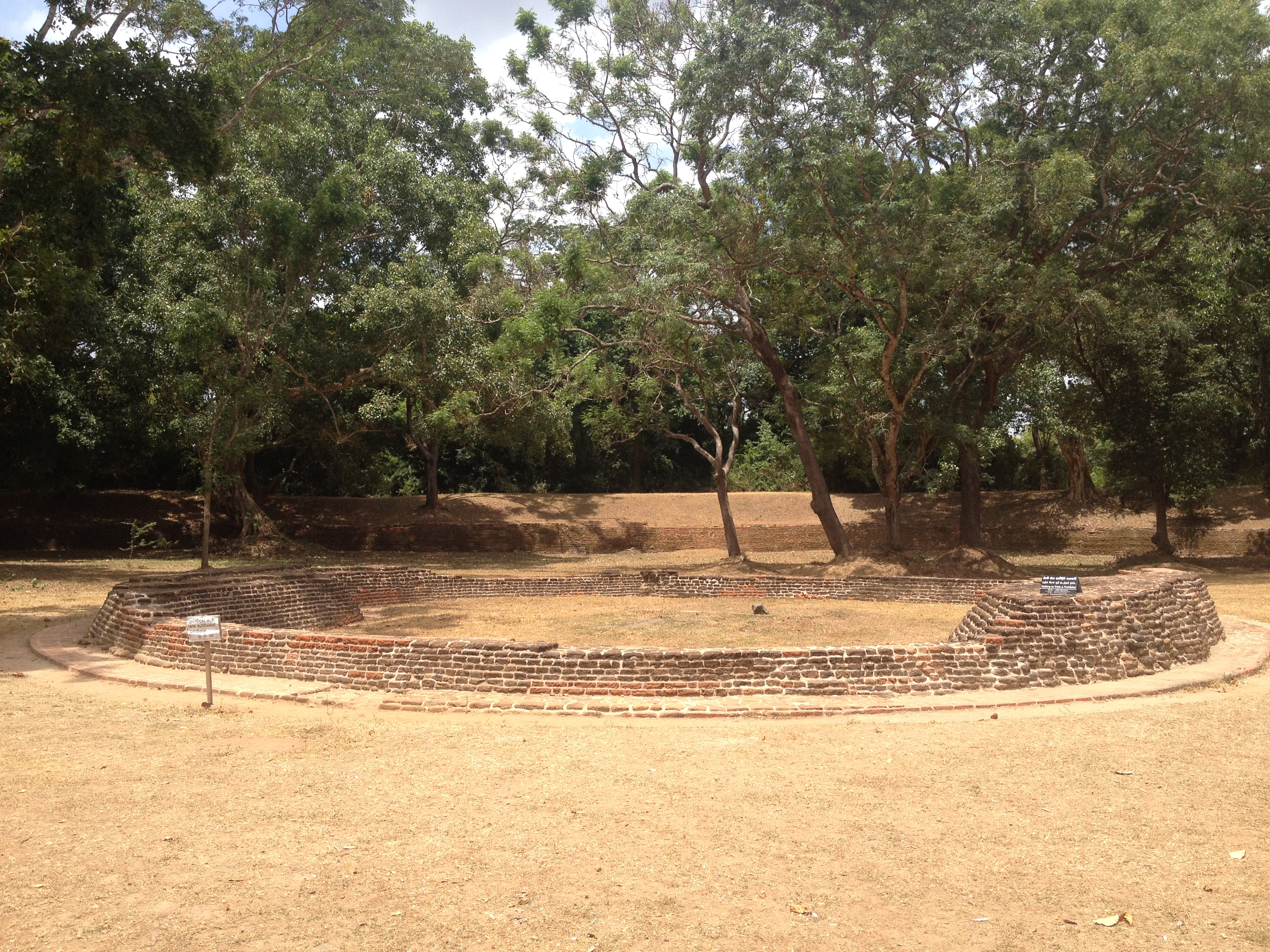
Chakrawala Kotte
