= Maya Rata =

Ancient Sinhalese kingdom

Principality of Maya Rata
- 504 BC–1153
- Principality of Maya Rata Kingdom of Polonnaruwa before 1153 Principality of Ruhuna
- Capital: Panduwasnuwara (504 BC–12 century); Kelaniya (3rd century BC)
- Common languages: Sinhala
- Religion: Buddhism
- Government: Monarchy
  - 504 BC-474 BC: Panduwas Deva
  - 1187–1196: Parakramabahu of Dakkhinadesa
- History
  - Established: 504 BC
  - Disestablished: 1153
Preceded by	Succeeded by
Kingdom of Upatissa Nuwara	Anuradhapura Kingdom; 1153: Kingdom of Polonnaruwa

The Maya Rata (Principality of), also known as the Kingdom of Dakkinadesa, was a principality or an administrative region of the Sinhalese kingdom. It was located in the Southwestern part of Sri Lanka, bordered the Deduru Oya. Its last capital was Parakramapura. The principality was disbanded following the formation of the second kingdom of Polonnaruwa by Parakramabahu I.

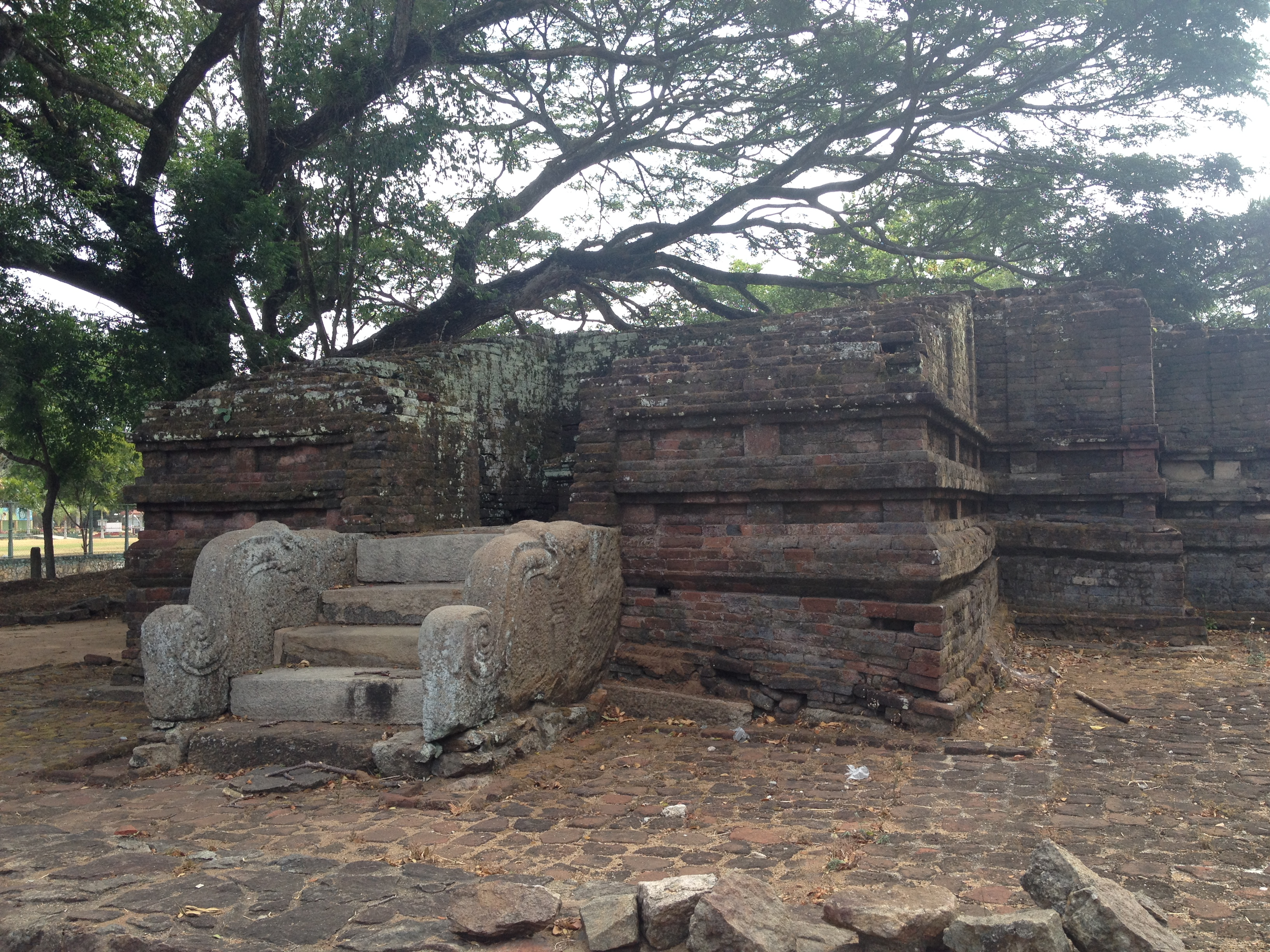
A ruins of a Bodhighara (an enclosure constructed around bo-trees) at Kingdom of Dakkinadesa archaeological site

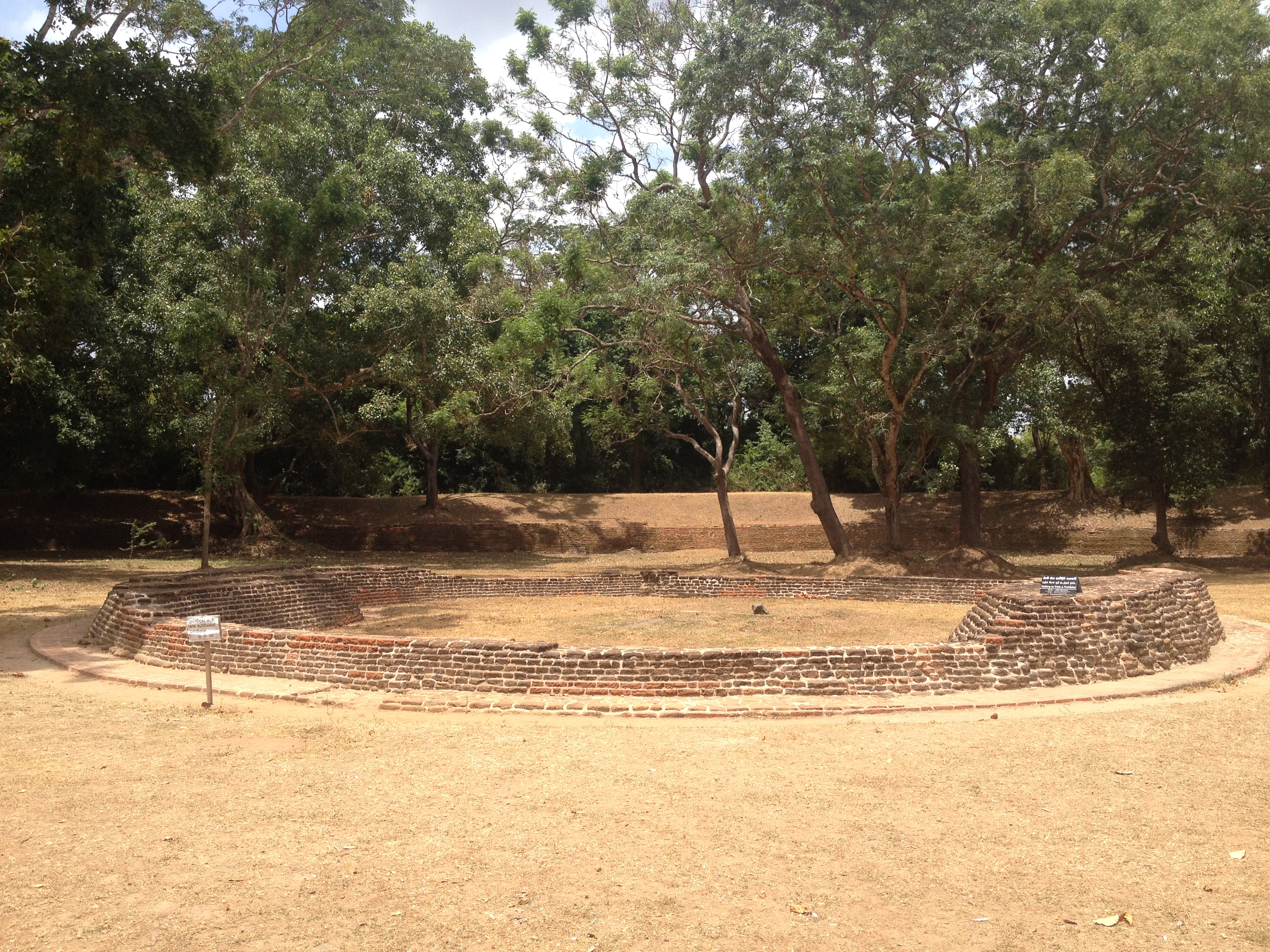
The so-called Chakrawalaya, foundations of a circular building or tower, and the subject of numerous stories

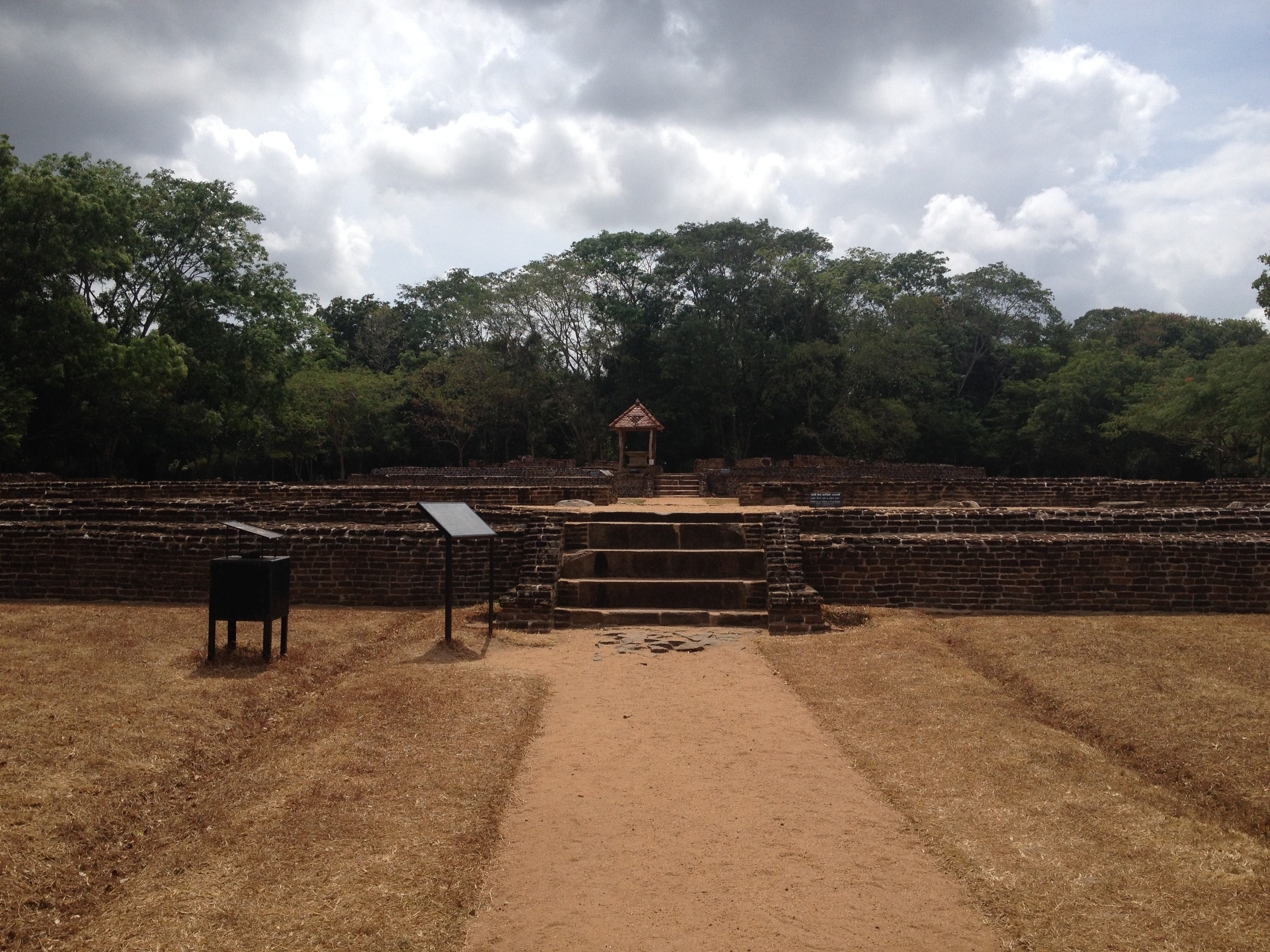
The ruins of the palace (12th century)

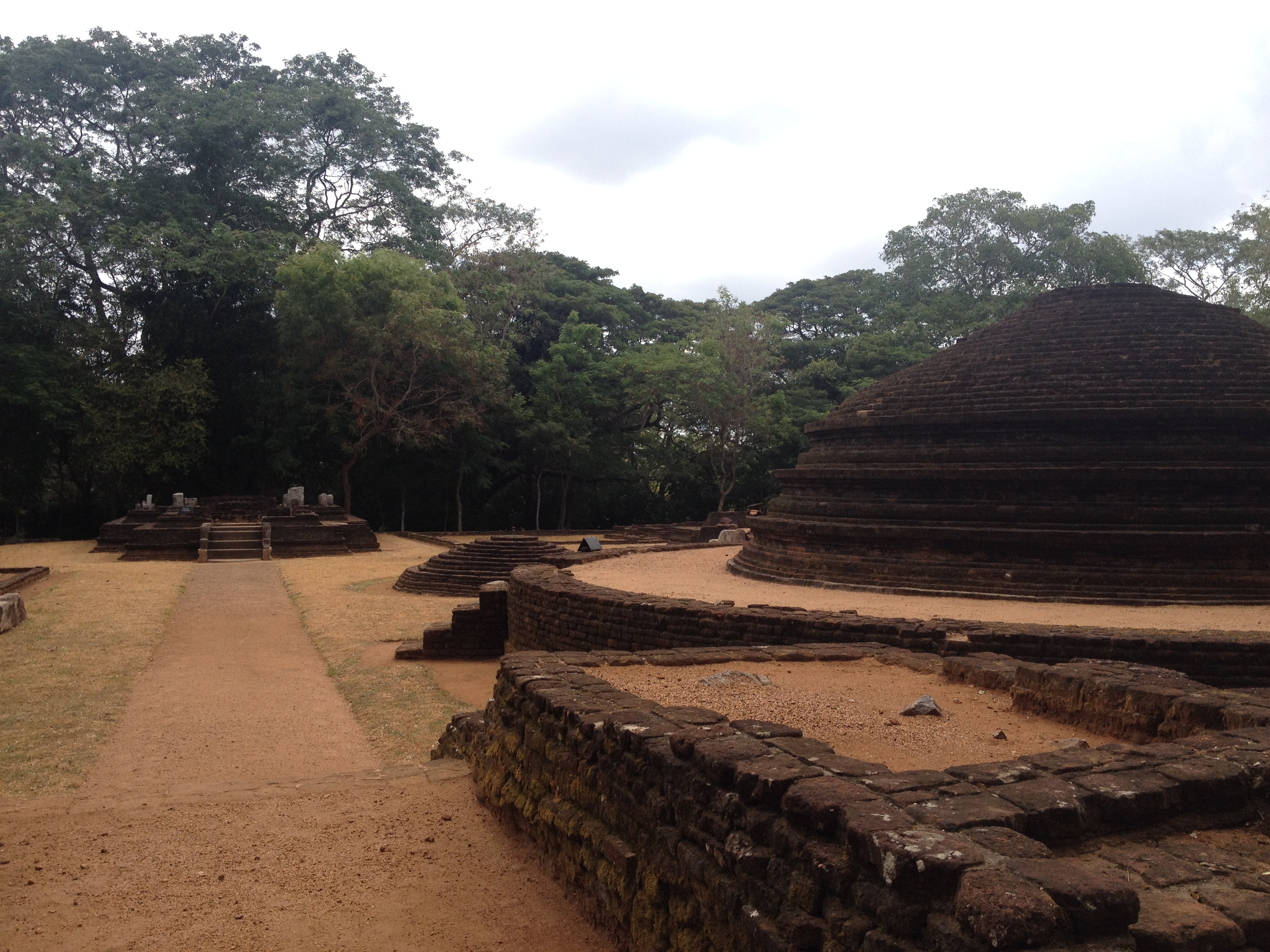
Ruins of Buddhist Panchayathana

While Rajarata was under the direct administration of the King, Maya Rata was governed by a "Mapa" (Note: The principality of Ruhuna was governed by an "Epa" (Sinhala: ඈපා, [æ:pa:]))(Sinhala: මාපා, [maːpaː]), also referred to as a "Mahaya". The name of the region, "Maya," is derived from this title (Mahaya Rata > Maya Rata).

== See also ==
- History of Sri Lanka
- List of monarchs of Sri Lanka
