= Pinnawala Central College =

- පින්නවල මධ්‍ය මහා විද්‍යාලය

Location
- Rambukkana Road; Pinnawala; Sri Lanka
- Coordinates: 7.310917°N 80.389165°E

Information
- Other name: Pinnawala National School
- School type: National School
- Motto: දේ ආලෝක (Enlighten the soul)
- Religious affiliation: Buddhist
- Founded: 1882; 144 years ago
- School district: Kegalle
- Principal: Chandani Rajawardhana
- Grades: 6–13
- Gender: Co-educational
- Age: 10 to 19
- Enrollment: 2,800
- Language: English and Sinhala
- Houses: Mahaweli; Kelani; Nilwala; Walawe
- Colors: Maroon and gold
- Song: අප අභිමානය
- Team name: Tuskers
- Website: pinnawalacentral.lk/

Pinnawala Central College (Sinhala: පින්නවල මධ්‍ය මහා විද්‍යාලය, romanized: Pinnawala Madhya Mahā Vidyālaya, Tamil: பின்னவல மத்திய மஹா கல்லூரி, romanized: Pinnawala Maththiya Maha Kalloori) also known as the Pinnawala National School or Pinnawala Central is a public school near Pinnawala in Sri Lanka. The college is located approximately 2 km (1.2 mi) from Rambukkana and approximately 14 km (8.7 mi) from Kegalle.

The college is funded by the Ministry of Education, which appoints its principal, and falls within the Mawanella Education zone. The principal is the head of the administration of the college and is assisted by a vice principal. The college educates around 2,800 students for their secondary education (Grades 6–13). The college hostels are administered by the wardens under the supervision of the principal and assisted by a sub-warden.

== History ==
Pinnawala Central College was established in 1882 as the 'Government Boys' School' on 0.5 ha (1.2 acres) of land with 45 students and 6 teachers in one building. There were no written records from 1882 to 1926. According to the written history, Mr. Brampisingo was the first principal, appointed from 1920–1926. In the beginning, there were only a few classes that covered the local syllabus for grades 1 to 5. In 1956, the school was upgraded to a mixed(co-educational) school. The school student population also got increased drastically from 1926 to 1958 and new buildings and staff were added to the school. A contribution was offered by a philanthropist and politician, N. H. Keerthiratne, and S. A. Lokubandara Bentota.

In 1963, the opportunity was obtained to follow the Advanced Level Examination in Arts stream increased the classes from grades 1–12 and laid the path for more students to enrol at the school. Students were allowed to enter the Advanced Level in the science stream in 1964 and later in the commerce stream; it became a national school on 12 September 1995 with grades 6–13.

The school's own land was expanded to 2.44 ha (6.0 acres), hosting 45 buildings. Two double-storey buildings were opened as male and female hostels on 0.5 ha (1.2 acres) of land. The school offers a large rectangular playground, a library, and an audio-visual unit laboratory, for G.C.E. O/L, an Information Technology unit, a Home Science unit, an Agriculture unit, an Aesthetic unit, a Scout troop, a Cadet unit, and an Environmental unit.

== Houses ==
The students are divided into four houses. These are led by house captains, competing in all major games to win the inter-house games, and house colours are awarded winners. The houses are:

| Name | Native name | Motto | Colour |
|---|---|---|---|
| Mahaweli | මහවැලි | | Yellow |
| Kelani | කැළණි | | Red |
| Walawe | වලවේ | | Green |
| Nilwala | නිල්වලා | | Blue |

== Special events ==
In 2017, two-day training for Sepaktakraw was scheduled to be held at Pinnawala Central College grounds for the eight schools of the Kegalle District and Uva/Sabaragamuwa Provinces by invitation from the President of the newly formed Sri Lanka Schools Sepak Takraw Association, Wasantha Kumara. Players from Pinnawala Central College planned to compete at the sport's world championship in Thailand the same year.

== Notable alumni ==
This is a list of notable alumni from Pinnawala Central College.

| Name | Notability | Reference |
|---|---|---|
| W. K. H. Wegapitiya | Founder and the Executive Chairman of Laugfs Holdings Limited; a diversified enterprise in Sri Lanka | |
| Ruwan Gopura | Pioneer in Sri Lankan robotics research; Dean, Faculty of Graduate Studies, University of Moratuwa (2024–to date). Head of the Department of Mechanical Engineering University of Moratuwa (2017–2020), Founding Head, Department of Medical Technology University of Moratuwa (2021–2024) | |
| Premakumar Gunaratnam | former JVP leader; Chief Secretary – Frontline Socialist Party; political activist | |
