= Panduwasnuwara =

Ruins of an Ancient Kingdom

Coordinates: 7°36′01.3″N 80°06′11.9″E

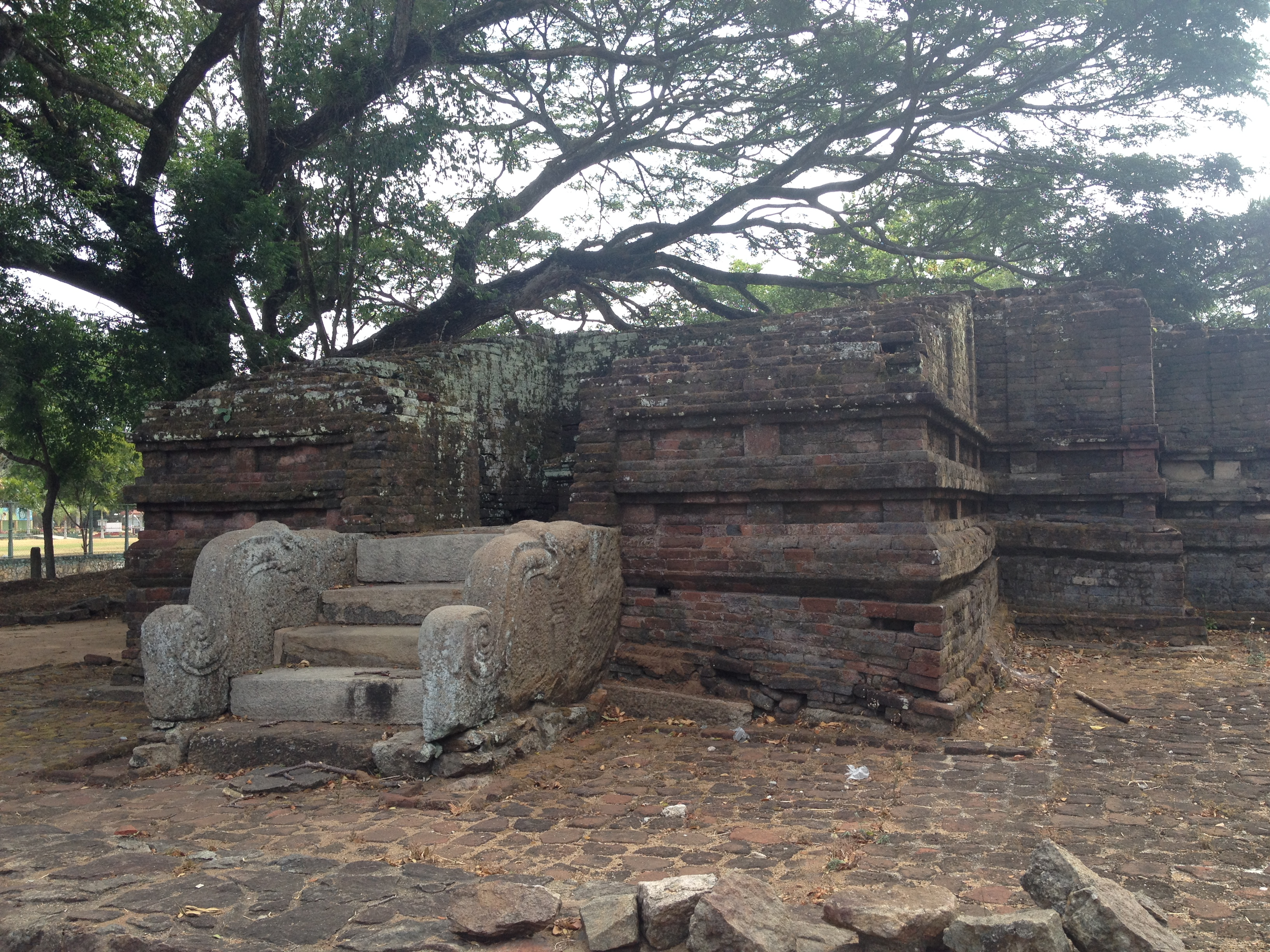
A ruins of a Bodhighara (an enclosure constructed around bo-trees) at Panduwasnuwara archaeological site

Panduwasnuwara is an ancient capital, situated in Kurunegala District, Sri Lanka. It is said to be the controlling centre known as Parakramapura of Dakkhinadesa (South Country) in the 12th century, when it was ruled by Parakramabahu. The remaining ruins of the ancient kingdom still can be seen at Kotampitiya area which lies along Wariyapola-Chilaw main road about 19 km (12 mi) away from Wariyapola town. Panduvasnuwara is located at a distance of 3 km from Hettipola and 18 km from Kuliyapitiya.

== Name ==
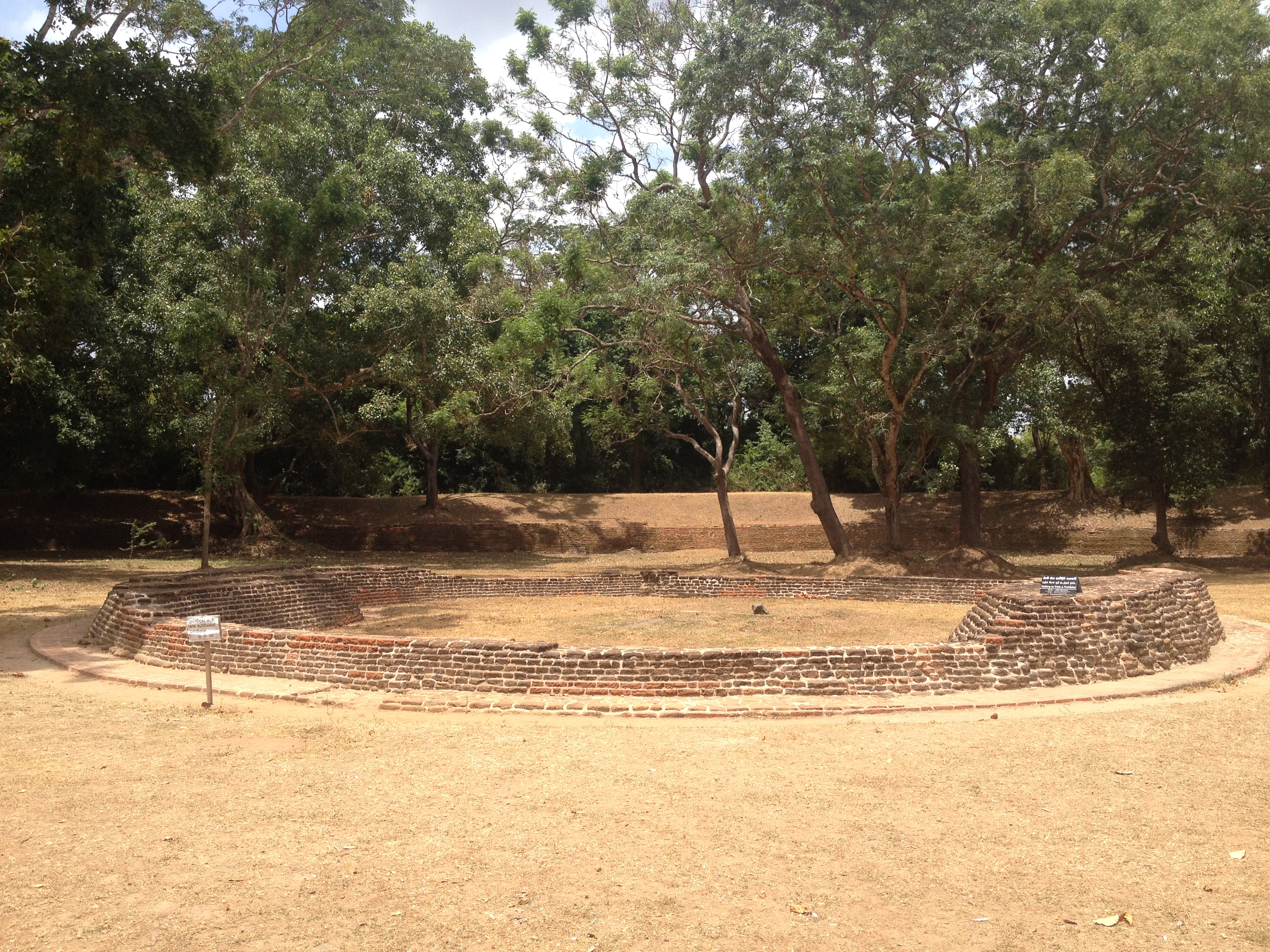
The so-called Chakrawalaya, foundations of a circular building or tower, and the subject of numerous stories

The current site has been identified as Parakramapura, the city of Dakkhinadesa, founded by King Parakramabahu the Great when he was the sub-king of the territory and called Panduwasnuwara presently. It is believed that the name Panduwasnuwara came to the usage during the recent Kurunegala period.

Due to its name this site is erroneously identified by the locals as the ancient capital of king Panduwasadeva who ruled the country in 504 BC to 474 BC. They believe that the structure known as Chakrawalaya which is situated in the site as the Ektemge (a circular tower) where princess Unmada Chitra was confined by her brothers and also a nearby village called Dorabawa to be the Doramadalawa village where prince Pandukabhaya spent his childhood. But still, there is no archaeological evidence to prove such stories.

According to another belief, the name Panduwasnuwara was formed due to an ancient tank called Panda Wewa which is situated in the nearby area.

== History ==
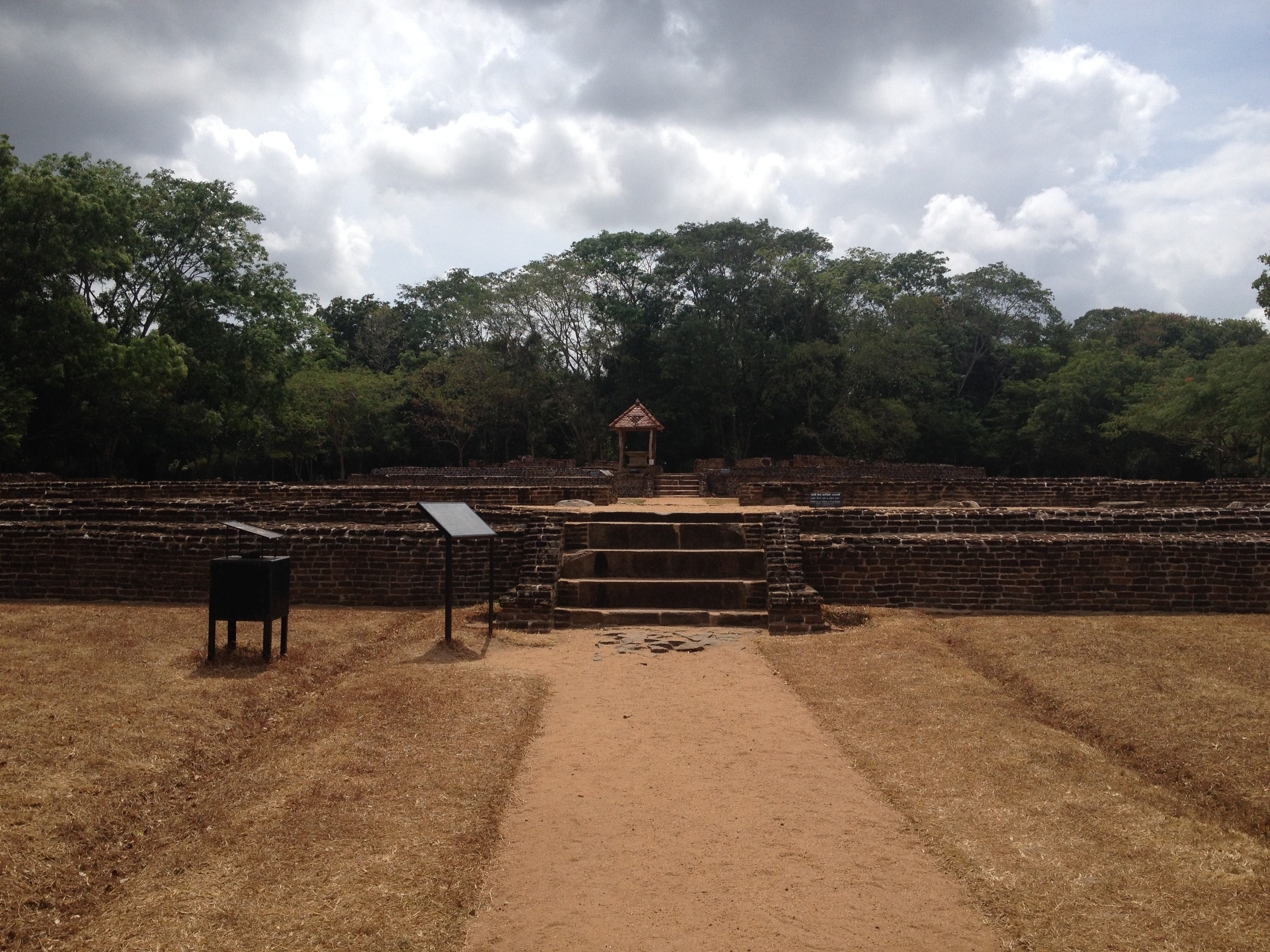
The ruins of palace (12th century)

As the Successor of his uncle king Kirti Sri Megha, Prince Parakramabahu became the ruler of Dakkhinadesa in 1140 A.D. It was the first capital of Parakramabahu and one of the three discrete kingdoms into which the Island was divided. Historical evidence proves that King Parakramabahu had made steps to develop the infrastructure and other common facilities in the ruling territory.

During this period he had constructed a separate tooth temple at Panduwasnuwara Raja Maha Vihara premises for tooth relic of Buddha to keep it safe. After a series of successful battles with his enemies, Parakramabahu managed to conquer the control of the entire nation and moved to Polonnaruwa where his new capital was built. The tooth relic of Buddha was also brought with him as the reputed symbol of principality.

== Ruins ==
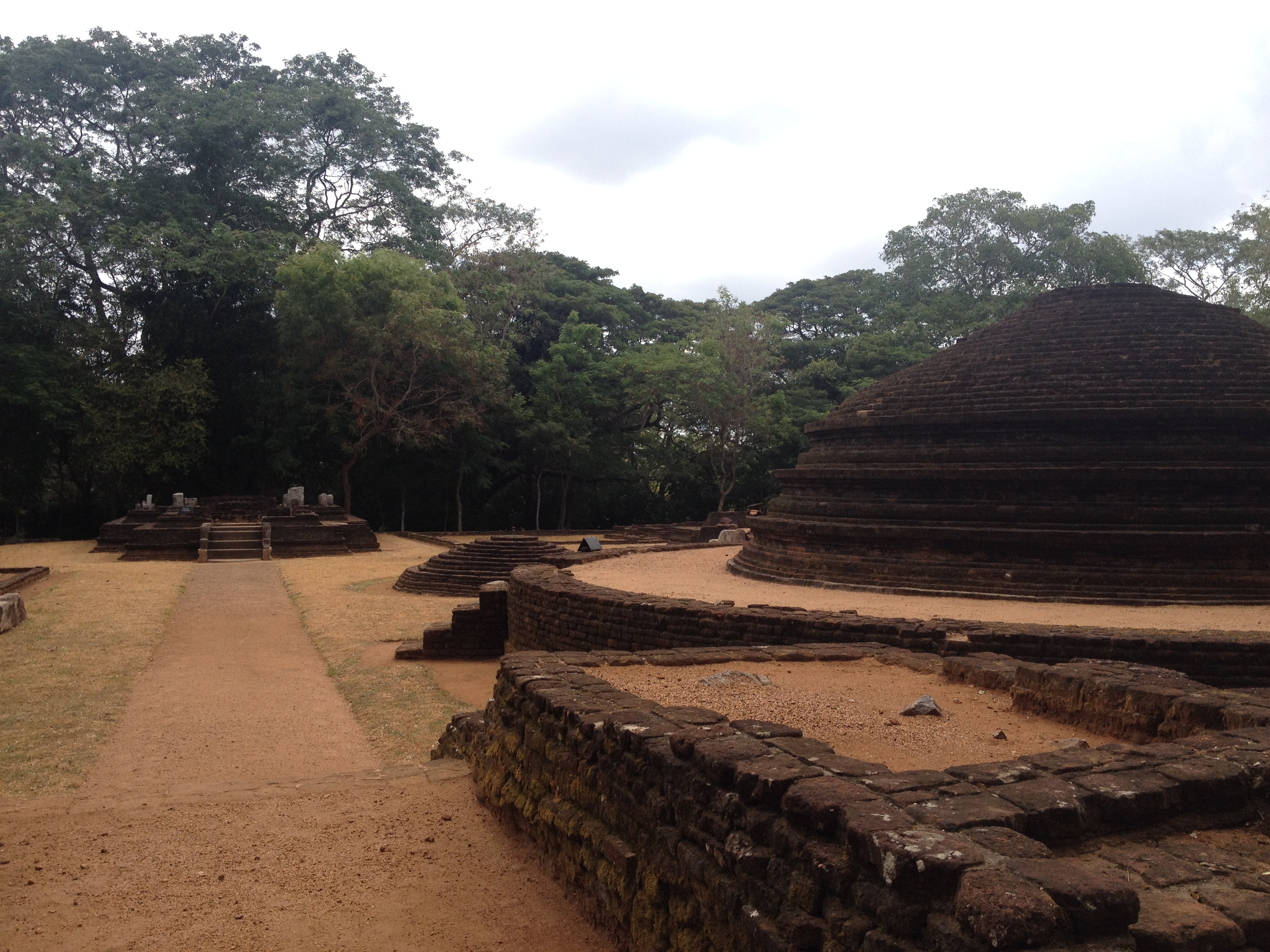
Ruins of Buddhist Panchayathana

The ruins scattered over about 20 hectares in Panduwasnuwara belong to the 12th century A.D. Among the ruins a palace, monasteries, image houses, dagobas and monks' living quarters, carved pillars, guard stones, and other ancient constructions can be seen. The remains of the palace are bounded by a moat and a brick rampart and the ground plan of the palace is similar to the palace of King Parakramabahu of Polonnaruwa. According to Stone seat inscription, a slab inscription established in the palace premises records that king Kirti Sri Nissankamalla (1187-1196 A.D.) visited this palace once on the way of his one of tours.

From the south and north areas of the palace are remains of several monasteries belonging to the Panchayathana architectural style. Stupa, image houses, Bodhighara and dwelling houses are available in each monastery. Besides the Sinhalese inscriptions there is a Tamil inscription belonging to the reign of Nissankamalla, in one monastery premises.

Middle of the ruin site a modern temple, Panduwas Nuwara Raja Maha Vihara is situated and where small Tempita Vihara (Temple on pillars) and several pillar inscriptions belonging to 9-10th century A.D can be seen.
