= Zahira College, Kalmunai =

Coordinates: 7.419028°N 81.821922°E

- கமு/ஸாஹிரா கல்லூரி தேசிய பாடசாலை
- Kalmunai, Ampara District; Eastern Province; Sri Lanka

Information
- School type: National School1 AB Super
- Motto: "Man jadda wa jadda" (He who tries, will achieve)
- Established: 16 November 1949; 76 years ago
- Founder: M. S. Kariapper
- Principal: M. I. Jabir
- Teaching staff: 160
- Grades: Grade 6-13
- Gender: Boys
- Language: English and Tamil
- Colours: Green and Yello
- Website: www.kmzahira.com

Zahira College, Kalmunai (commonly known as Kalmunai Zahira) is a boys national school in Ampara District, Sri Lanka. It was founded in 1949 as English Junior School by the M. S. Kariapper, Member of Ceylon Parliament. The college is situated in Sainthamaruthu, in the municipality of Kalmunai. It has been graded as 1AB Super School by Ministry of Education Sri Lanka and it has all the streams of GCE Advanced Level in Sri Lanka - Biological and Physical science, Commerce, Arts and Technology.

In 2004, the school was affected by a tsunami. The current principal of Kalmunai Zahira is M.I.Jabir Sir

== See also ==
- List of schools in Eastern Province, Sri Lanka
