= Zahira College, Mawanella =

Sri Lankan school

Coordinates: 7.25244°N 80.45539°E

Zahira College Mawanella
- சாஹிரா கல்லூரி மாவனெல்ல
- Motto: Discipline, Dynamism, Dexterity
- Type: National
- Established: 1920
- Location: Mawanella
- Colours: Maroon White & Blue
- Website: mawanellazahira.com

Zahira College, Mawanella (also referred to as Mawanella Zahira) is a Muslim selective entry co-educational school in Mawanella, Sri Lanka. The college began as a result of the educational reform that accompanied the 1920 political reforms. It started as a religious school in a cadjan shed belonging to the Hinguloya Masjidul Huda. It is one of the largest Muslim educational institutions in Sri Lanka with more than 4,000 students. The college is located in Mawanella next to Masjidul Huda.
