= Zahira College, Dharga Town =

- සහිරා විද්‍යාලය, දර්ගා නගරය ஸாஹிரா கல்லுரி, தர்கா நகர்

Location
- Zahira College Road, Dharga Town, Western Province, 12090; Sri Lanka
- Coordinates: 6.443320464555205°N 80.00464593921158°E

Information
- Type: Government School
- Motto: Arabic: Rabbi Zidni Ilma (My Lord, increase me in knowledge)
- Established: 1942
- Founder: T. B. Jayah
- School district: Kalutara
- School number: 034 2275 036
- Principal: Mrs. M.N.F. Nisreen (2017 - present)
- Grades: 6–13 (Tamil and Sinhala Medium)
- Gender: Mixed School
- Age: From 11 years to 19 years
- Colours: Green, Yellow, Blue
- Alumni: Zahirians

Zahira College, Dharga Town (Commonly known as Dharga Town Zahira) (Sinhala: සහිරා විද්‍යාලය, දර්ගා නගරය Tamil: ஸாஹிரா கல்லுரி, தர்கா நகர்), is a government school located in Dharga Town, Sri Lanka. Established in 1942, it was the first branch school of Zahira College, Colombo.

== History ==
Zahira College, Dharga Town, was established as a branch of Zahira College, Colombo in 1942 at the start of the Second World War, a decision made by then-principal of Colombo Zahira College Dr. T. B. Jayah to benefit outstation students who found it difficult to attend school in Colombo.

The school began operating in a large house and had 49 students and five teachers by 1943. In 1945, the school moved into its own building, which was formally opened by Dr. C.W.W. Kannangara, the Minister in charge of Education. On June 1, 1946, it was registered as a separate school and ceased to be a branch of Colombo Zahira. A new two-story building was added in 1954, with the foundation stone laid by then-Prime Minister D.S. Senanayake.

== Academic Performance and Sports ==
The school has demonstrated consistent academic improvement, achieving district-wide rankings of 29th, 20th, and 15th among Grade AB1 schools for Ordinary Level examination results in 2006, 2009, and 2010, respectively. By 2011, the school had grown to over 1,500 students and 74 teachers.

In the field of sports, the college's under-13 soccer team won the Kalutara District Championship in 2008, and the under-15 team won the district championship in 2010. Several students have been selected to represent Sri Lankan schools in international competitions.

Furthermore, the college actively participates in national school football tournaments. In 2024, Zahira College, Dharga Town was one of the 16 teams invited to compete in the annual Zahira Super 16 Soccer Sevens Championship, which is organized by the Past Prefects' Association of Zahira College, Colombo. The tournament was won by Hameed Al Husseinie College.

== Houses ==
Students are divided into three houses for sports and academic competitions:

- Jaya (Green)
- Azeez (Yellow)
- Siddi Lebbe (Blue)

== Past Principals ==
Name	From	To
Mr. M.B. Noordeen	1942	
Mr. M.S.M. Haddad	1943	
Mrs. S. Ebert	1943	
Mr. T.P.S. Laxana	1944	1948
Mr. S.L.M. Shafie Marikkar	1948	1961
Mr. A.Z. Omerdeen	1962	
Mr. Y.L.M. Abul Hasan	1963	1965
Al-Haj I.L.M. Shuhaib	1966	1987
Al-Haj A.W.M. Ajward	1987	1989
Mr. M.R.M. Malik	1989	
Mr. M.L. Abdul Ahla	1989	1994
Mr. A.B.M. Alavi	1994	2006
Mr. P. Kanzul Rahman	2007	
Mr. M.T.M. Mujeebudheen	2007	2011
Al-Haj M.S.M. Yesmin	2011	
Al-Haj U.L.M. Rasik	2011	2012
Al-Haj M.S.M. Yesmin	2012	2015
Mr. M.T.M. Hamza	2015	2017

== See also ==
- List of schools in Western Province, Sri Lanka
- https://www.schoolandcollegelistings.com/LK/Aluthgama/114274383682971/KL--Zahira-College
- https://beruwala.ps.gov.lk/?page_id=216
