= Chinthaka Mayadunne =

Sri Lankan politician

Hon. Chinthaka Mayadunne MP
- චින්තක මායාදුන්නේ சிந்தகா மாயமானார்

Member of the Parliament of Sri Lanka
- Incumbent
- Assumed office 2020
- Constituency: Puttalam District

Member of the North Western Provincial Council
- In office 2013–2018
- Constituency: Puttalam District

Personal details
- Born: Chinthaka Amal Mayadunne; 11 October 1975 (age 50)
- Party: Sri Lanka Podujana Peramuna
- Other political affiliations: Sri Lanka People's Freedom Alliance

Chinthaka Amal Mayadunne (born 11 October 1975) is a Sri Lankan politician, former provincial councillor and Member of Parliament.

Mayadunne was born on 11 October 1975. He was a member of Uhana Divisional Council and the North Western Provincial Council. He contested the 2015 parliamentary election as one of the United People's Freedom Alliance (UPFA) electoral alliance's candidates in Puttalam District but failed to get elected after coming 6th amongst the UPFA candidates. He contested the 2020 parliamentary election as a Sri Lanka People's Freedom Alliance electoral alliance candidate in Puttalam District and was elected to the Parliament of Sri Lanka.

Electoral history of Chinthaka Mayadunne
Election	Constituency	Party	Alliance	Votes	Result
2009 provincial	Puttalam District		United People's Freedom Alliance	12,609	Not elected
2013 provincial	Puttalam District		United People's Freedom Alliance	24,504	Elected
2015 parliamentary	Puttalam District		United People's Freedom Alliance	23,460	Not elected
2020 parliamentary	Puttalam District	Sri Lanka Podujana Peramuna	Sri Lanka People's Freedom Alliance	53,618	Elected
