= Chinthaka Jayawickrama =

Sri Lankan cricketer (born 1984)

Chinthaka Jayawickrama (born Yodage Chinthaka Bandara Jayawickrama on 2 January 1984) was a Sri Lankan cricketer who played for Sri Lanka Army Sports Club. He was born in Kegalle.

Jayawickrama made a single first-class appearance for the side, during the 2006–07 season, against Chilaw Marians. He scored a duck in the first innings in which he batted, and 16 runs in the second, as Sri Lanka Army lost the match by an innings margin.

He bowled six overs in the match, taking figures of 1–17.
