= Dharga Town =

Dharga Town ධර්ගා නගරය தர்கா நகர்
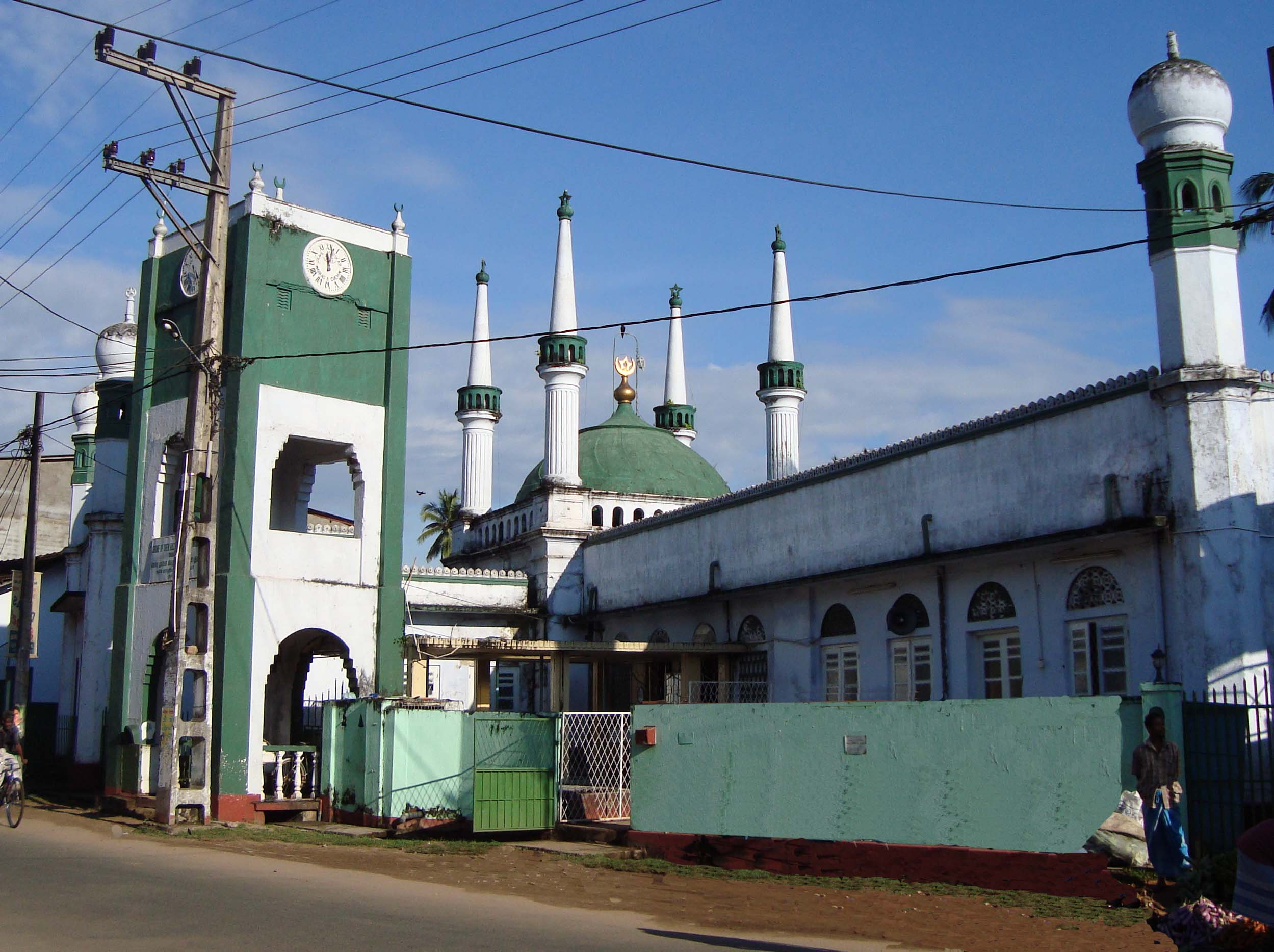
- Sheik Hasan Bin Osman Magdoomy (Rah) Dharga Mosque

- Location in Sri Lanka
- Coordinates: 6°26′45″N 80°00′09″E
- Country: Sri Lanka
- Province: Western Province
- District: Kalutara District

Population (2012)
  - Total: 20,540
- Time zone: UTC+05:30 (SLST)
- Postal code: 12090
- Area code: 034

Dharga Town (Sinhala: ධර්ගා නගරය; Tamil: தர்கா நகர்) is a town located in Kalutara District, Western Province, Sri Lanka. It is governed by the Beruwala Urban Council under the Government of Sri Lanka, and is close to Aluthgama and the tourist town Bentota.

Dharga Town received its name from the shrine of Sheik Hassan Bin Osman Magodoomy (Rali). The Shrine was established around 1866 when the sheik was enshrined in his home town.

== History ==
The first Sri Lankan Muslim settlement was established at Berbereen (Beruwala), which was named in honour of Abu Yusuf al-Barbari, the Berber traveller who founded the city. The second Muslim settlement was established at Alutgamaweedia, which was subsequently renamed Dharga Town in the 1940's by its Muslim inhabitants.

== 2014 Anti-Muslim Riots ==
After a speech from Galagoda Aththe Gnanasara, leader of the Bodu Bala Sena, a local mosque was stoned by a mob. Subsequently, a two-day period of unrest occurred, resulting in widespread destruction of mosques, homes, and businesses and a total of four fatalities and eighty reported injuries. Local police then imposed a curfew in the affected areas, restoring control.

== Education ==
Dharga Town hosts several educational institutions including three government Muslim schools: Zahira College, Al Hambra Maha Vidyalaya, and Aluthgamveediya Muslims Ladies National School. Zahira College stands as one of the oldest schools in the area. Additionally, the town has two other government schools: KL-Pathirajagoda Preliminary School and Sri Gnanissara Maha Vidyalaya. Among the private schools are Alif International School and Bambridge International School.

Dharga Town is also home to Ilharul Islam Arabic College. An orphanage known as Isha Athul Islam Child Development Centre also operates in the area.

Dharga Town is the location of one of the government's teacher-training colleges, named Dharga Nagar National College of Education.

== Population ==
Dharga Town has a population of 20,540, with the majority being Sri Lankan Moors. Sinhalese and Tamils make up the rest (including Seenawatha 765-A and Welipitiya 768-A)

== Infrastructure ==
The B157 Aluthgama – Mathugama road provides a key transportation route to and from the town. The town has a well-developed public transport system centered around buses, managed by both private operators and the government-owned Sri Lanka Transport Board (SLTB). The Aluthgama Bus Stand serves as the primary bus stand of the town. It is located along the B157 Aluthgama – Mathugama road .

The Aluthgama Railway Station is located on the Coastal Line, connecting Colombo to Matara and Beliatta.
