= Fort (Colombo) Grama Niladhari Division =

Fort
- Grama Niladhari Division
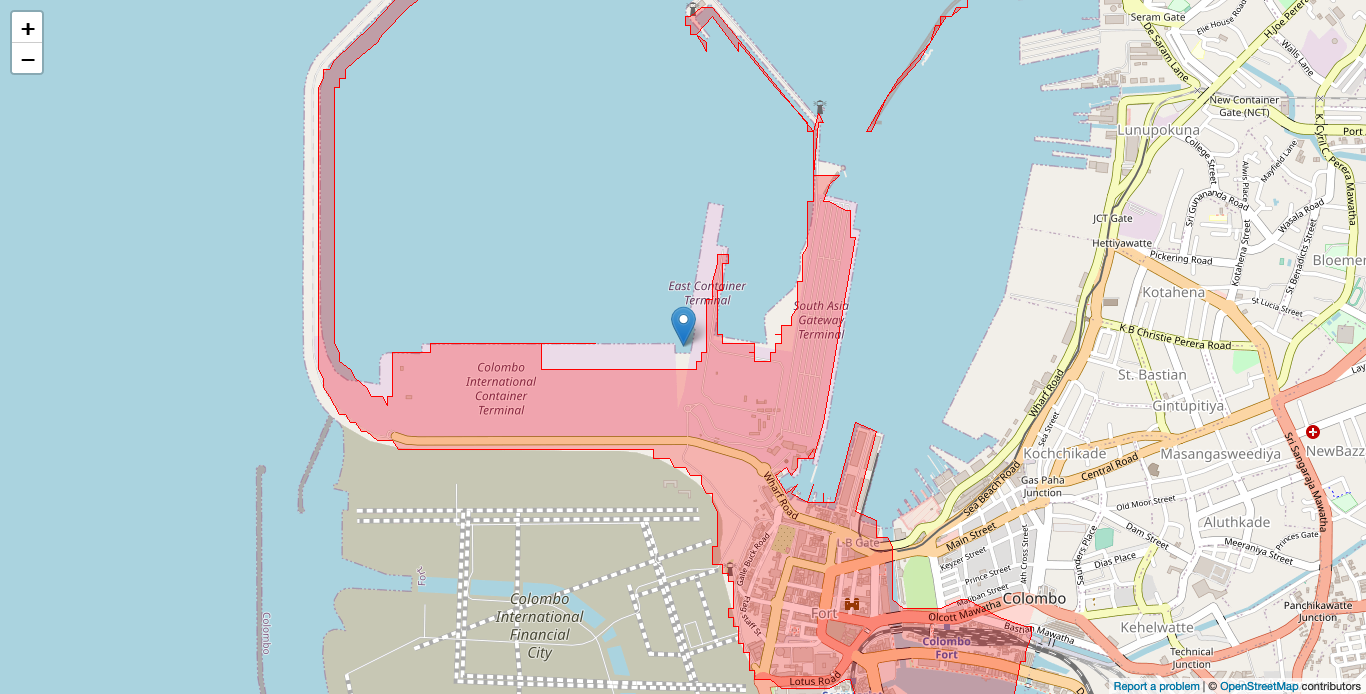
- Fort Grama Niladhari Division
- Interactive map of Fort
- Coordinates: 6.945689°N 79.838749°E
- Country: Sri Lanka
- Province: Western Province
- District: Colombo District
- Divisional Secretariat: Colombo Divisional Secretariat
- Electoral District: Colombo Electoral District
- Polling Division: Colombo Central Polling Division

Area
  - Total: 3.06 km^{2} (1.18 sq mi)
- Elevation: 0 m (0 ft)

Population (2012)
  - Total: 1,473
  - Density: 481/km^{2} (1,250/sq mi)
- ISO 3166 code: LK-1103120

Fort Grama Niladhari Division is a Grama Niladhari Division of the Colombo Divisional Secretariat of Colombo District of Western Province, Sri Lanka .

Sambodhi Chaithya are located within, nearby or associated with Fort.

Fort is a surrounded by the Pettah, Suduwella, Hunupitiya, Slave Island and Galle Face Grama Niladhari Divisions.

== Demographics ==
=== Ethnicity ===
The Fort Grama Niladhari Division has a Sinhalese majority (92.9%) . In comparison, the Colombo Divisional Secretariat (which contains the Fort Grama Niladhari Division) has a Moor plurality (40.1%), a significant Sri Lankan Tamil population (31.1%) and a significant Sinhalese population (25.0%)

Ethnicity in Fort
1. Sinhalese (92.9%)
2. Sri Lankan Tamil (4.00%)
3. Moor (1.20%)
4. Indian Tamil (1.00%)
5. Other (1.00%)

=== Religion ===
The Fort Grama Niladhari Division has a Buddhist majority (91.2%) . In comparison, the Colombo Divisional Secretariat (which contains the Fort Grama Niladhari Division) has a Muslim plurality (41.8%), a significant Hindu population (22.7%), a significant Buddhist population (19.0%) and a significant Roman Catholic population (13.1%)

Religion in Fort
1. Buddhist (91.2%)
2. Hindu (3.50%)
3. Roman Catholic (2.20%)
4. Muslim (2.10%)
5. Other (1.10%)

== Gallery ==
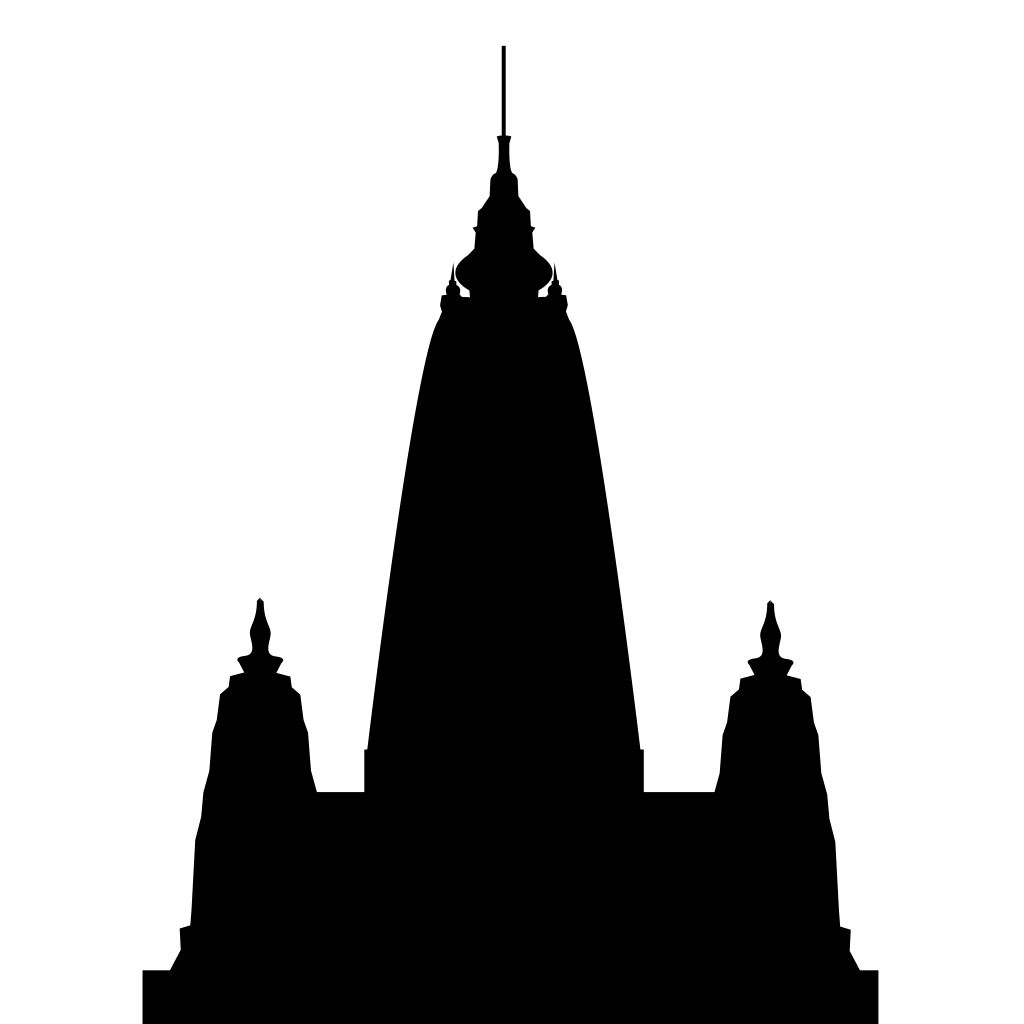
Sambodhi Chaithya
