= 2016–17 Sri Lanka FA Cup =

Cargills Food City FA Cup

Tournament details
- Country: Sri Lanka
- Dates: 24 November 2016 – 20 May 2017
- Teams: 672

Final positions
- Champions: Army SC (6th title)

The 2016–17 was the 55th season of Sri Lanka FA Cup, the top tier knockout football tournament in Sri Lanka. It was sponsored by Cargills for the 4th consecutive year, and known as Cargills Food City FA Cup. There were 672 clubs participating in 66 leagues around the country. The tournament began on 24 November 2016 with the preliminary round.

The defending champions were Army.

== Team allocation ==
The preliminary rounds were conducted at league level on a knockout basis. Accordingly, each league held knockout rounds for its clubs and the champions from each league advanced to the next round. A total of 60 (minus the 6 services) teams advanced and were added to the 31 teams who were among the final 32 team of the Cargills Food City FA Cup 2015.

Out of the qualified 60 teams, six received byes and the remaining 54 played a second round on a knockout basis. The qualifying 27 teams went into a draw with the remaining 37 teams. The final 64 teams were drawn to play the third stage.

Prior to entering for the tournament, from the total of 91 teams, 29 received the go to the next round based on their performance in the FA cup in 2015. A draw was held to fix the matches for this round.

== Teams ==
Round	Clubs Remaining	Clubs involved	Byes Received
Preliminary round	60	641	—
Second round	27	54	—
Third round	32	64	37
Fourth round	16	32	—
Fifth round	8	16	—
Quarter-finals	4	8	—
Semi-finals	2	4	—
Finals	1	2	—

== Prize Fund ==
- The winners received a cash award of Rs. 700,000.

== Preliminary round ==
In the preliminary round 641 clubs competed in their leagues. Then the winners of each league qualified for the second round. The second round consisted of 61 league winners.

=== League winners ===
This 61 league winners qualified for the second round.

- Udayasooriyan SC (Akkaraipattu)
- Urban Council SC (Ambalangoda)
- Olympic SC (Ampara)
- Anuradhapura United (Anuradhapura)
- Al Adhan SC (Badulla)
- Liberty SC (Bandarawela)
- Sivanantha SC (Batticaloa)
- Golden Rise SC (Beruwala)
- Kirindhiwela Paramount SC (Biyagama)
- Freedom SC (Chilaw)
- Cooray SC (City)
- Old Bens SC (Colombo)
- Thotawatte SC (Dehiwala)
- Solaniya SC (Deniyaya)
- Sun Shine SC (Divulapitiya)
- Walawa SC (Embilipitiya)
- Kurundhuwatta United (Galle)
- Kahatowita JF SC (Gampaha)
- Red Sun SC (Gampola)
- Technic SC (Hambanthota)
- Renown SC Hatton (Hatton)
- St.Mary’s SC (Jaffna)
- Vaanavil SC (Kalkuda)
- Green Field SC (Kalutara)
- Manchester SC (Kandy)
- Youth SC (Kataragama)
- National SC (Kathankudi)
- Maya SC (Kegalle)
- Prison SC (Kelaniya)
- Jegameetpar SC (Kilinochchi)
- Pioneer SC (Kinniya)
- Iqbal SC (Kuchchaveli)
- Young Spirit SC (Kurunegala)
- St.Xavier’s SC (Madhumanthai)
- United SC Joseph Vaz (Mannar)
- Gold Moon SC (Matale)
- Grahaloka SC (Matara)
- Serandib SC (Mawanella)
- Medagama SC (Monaragala)
- Young Birds SC (Mullativu)
- Reliance SC (Mutur)
- Young Marians SC (Nawalapitiya)
- Jupiters SC (Negombo)
- SLTB SC (NSSA)
- Young Birds SC (NuwaraEliya)
- Young Lions SC (Oddamavadi)
- Navagampura SC (Play Grounds)
- Vinmeengal SC (Point Pedro)
- BM Youth SC (Polgahawela)
- Lucky Birds SC (Polonnaruwa)
- Wimbledon SC (Puttalam)
- Municipal Council SC (Rathnapura)
- Philip Gunawardena A SC (Seethawaka)
- UO Moratuwa (SL Universities)
- HGS Blue SC (Sri J’Pura)
- Each/Green Light SC (Trincomalee)
- Diamonds SC (Vadamarachchi)
- Kurinchikkulam SC (Valikamam)
- Easwaran SC (Vavuniya)
- Old Mazenodians SC (Wattala)
- Al Hira SC (Wennapuwa)

== Second round ==
61 clubs of league winners contested in this round. The 30 winners advanced to the third round.

Old Bens	3–1	Sunshine

Solaniya	3–0	Technic

Grahaloka	0–0 (1–3 p)	UO Moratuwa

Kurundhuwatta Utd	1–1 (6–5 p)	Green Field

Urban Council	0–5	Golden Rise

Jupiters	4–1	HGS Blue

Old Mazenodian	7–1	Thotawatte

Cooray SC	3–0	Kahatowita JF

Navagampura	3–0	Paramount

Al Hira	3–0	Lucky Birds

Anuradhapura Utd	1–3	Wimbledon

Easwaran	3–0	Freedom

Serendib	2–2 (6–5 p)	Red Sun

Leo	5–1	BM Youth

Manchester	1–4	Maya

Gold Moon	3–0	Al Adhan

Young Birds	1–0	Young Marians

Philip Gunawardena A	3–0	Medagama

Youth	0–3	Municipal Council

Walawa	2–5	Liberty

St.Xavier’s	3–0	Iqbal

Vinmeengal	0–3	Kurinchikalum

Young Birds	3–0	Diamonds

Vaanavil	0–10	Olympic

Reliance	3–0	Pioneer

National	3–0	oung Lions

Jegameetpar	0–1	Prisons Department

Joseph Vaz	1–2	SLTB

== Third round ==
17 March 2017

Uni of Moratuwa 0–7 New Youngs FC

22 March 2017

Java Lane 2–0 Prison SC

Municipal Council (Rathnapura) 0–9 Saunders SC

24 March 2017

Air Force SC 13–0 Reliance SC

Liverpool SC 3–4 St.Mary’s SC

27 March 2017

Nawagampura SC 1—3 Crystal Palace FC

28 March 2017

St.Nicholas SC 4–0 Al Hira SC

Singing Fish SC 3–0 Jupiters SC

Kurinjikumaran SC 1–2 Brilliant SC

30 March 2017

Colombo FC 2–0 SLTB SC

2 April 2017

Olympic SC 0–3 Super Sun SC

Navy SC 2-0 Cooray SC

Maya SC (Kegalle FL) 0–3 Army SC (walkover)

St.Xavier’s SC (Madhu Manthai FL) 0–3 Matara City Club (walkover)

Pelicans SC 3–0 Philip Gunawardena SC (Seethawaka FL) (walkover)

Jet Liners SC 3–0 Solaniya SC (walkover)

7 April 2017

Old Mazenodians SC 2–3 Civil Security SC

Up Country Lions 5–1 Gold Moon SC (Matale FL)

Old Bens SC 1–2 New Star SC

Negombo Youth 9–0 Green Light SC (Trincomalee FL)

Police SC 9–0 Liberty SC (Bandarawela FL)

Leo SC (Kurunegala FL) 2–0 Thihariya Youth SC

Sivanantha SC 0–3 Kirulapone Utd

Renown SC 3–0 Young Birds SC (Mulativu FL)

8 April 2017

Serendib SC 1 (4)–1 (2) St.Joseph’s SC

Easwaran SC (Vavuniya FL) 3–0 Kalutara Park (walkover)

Wimbledon SC (Puttlam FL) 3–0 Hillary SC

Kurunduwatta SC (Galle FL) 0–1 Comrades SC

Young Birds SC (N’Eliya FL) 1–0 Solid SC

Renown SC (Hatton FL) 0–3 Blue Star SC

Red Star SC 10–1 National SC (Kanthankudy FL)

Date unknown

Golden Rise SC 3–0 Highlanders (awarded due to ineligible players)

== Fourth round ==
9 April 2017

Super Sun SC 2–1 Serendib SC

Saunders SC 6–1 Up Country Lions SC

Blue Star SC 3–0 Leo SC

10 April 2017

Crystal Palace 1(3)–1(2) New Youngs FC

11 April 2017

Negombo Youth 6–0 Jet Liners SC

Easwaran SC 0–20 Army SC

12 April 2017

Brilliant SC 2–1 Red Star SC

St.Mary’s SC 12–0 Wimbledon SC

St.Nicholas’ SC 0–1 Navy SC

21 April 2017

Civil Security 1(3)–1(4) Air Force SC

24 April 2017

Golden Rise SC 1–4 Renown SC

Kirulapone United 1–5 Java Lane

Colombo FC 3–0 Young Birds SC (walkover)

Comrades SC 2(1)–2(4) Pelican SC

25 April 2017

Police SC 0(1)–0(4) Singing Fish SC

Date unknown

Matara City 3–1 New Star SC

== Round of 16 ==
26 April 2017	Super Sun	1–0	St.Mary's

29 April 2017	SL Navy	1–4	SL Army

29 April 2017	Renown	8–0	Brilliant

30 April 2017	Pelicans	0–5	Colombo

30 April 2017	Saunders	2–2 (3–1 p)	Negombo Youth

30 April 2017	SL Air Force	3–0	Matara City

1 May 2017	Java Lane	2–0	Crystal Palace

1 May 2017	Singing Fish	1–2	Blue Star

== Quarterfinals ==
6 May 2017	SL Army	12–1	Super Sun

6 May 2017	Saunders	2–1	Blue Star

7 May 2017	SL Air Force	0–1	Colombo

7 May 2017	Renown	1–3	Java Lane

== Semifinals ==
13 May 2017	SL Army	3–2	Colombo

13 May 2017	Saunders	1–1 (3–5 p)	Java Lane

== Final ==
20 May 2017

SL Army	5–1	Java Lane
