= Slave Island Grama Niladhari Division =

Slave Island
- Grama Niladhari Division
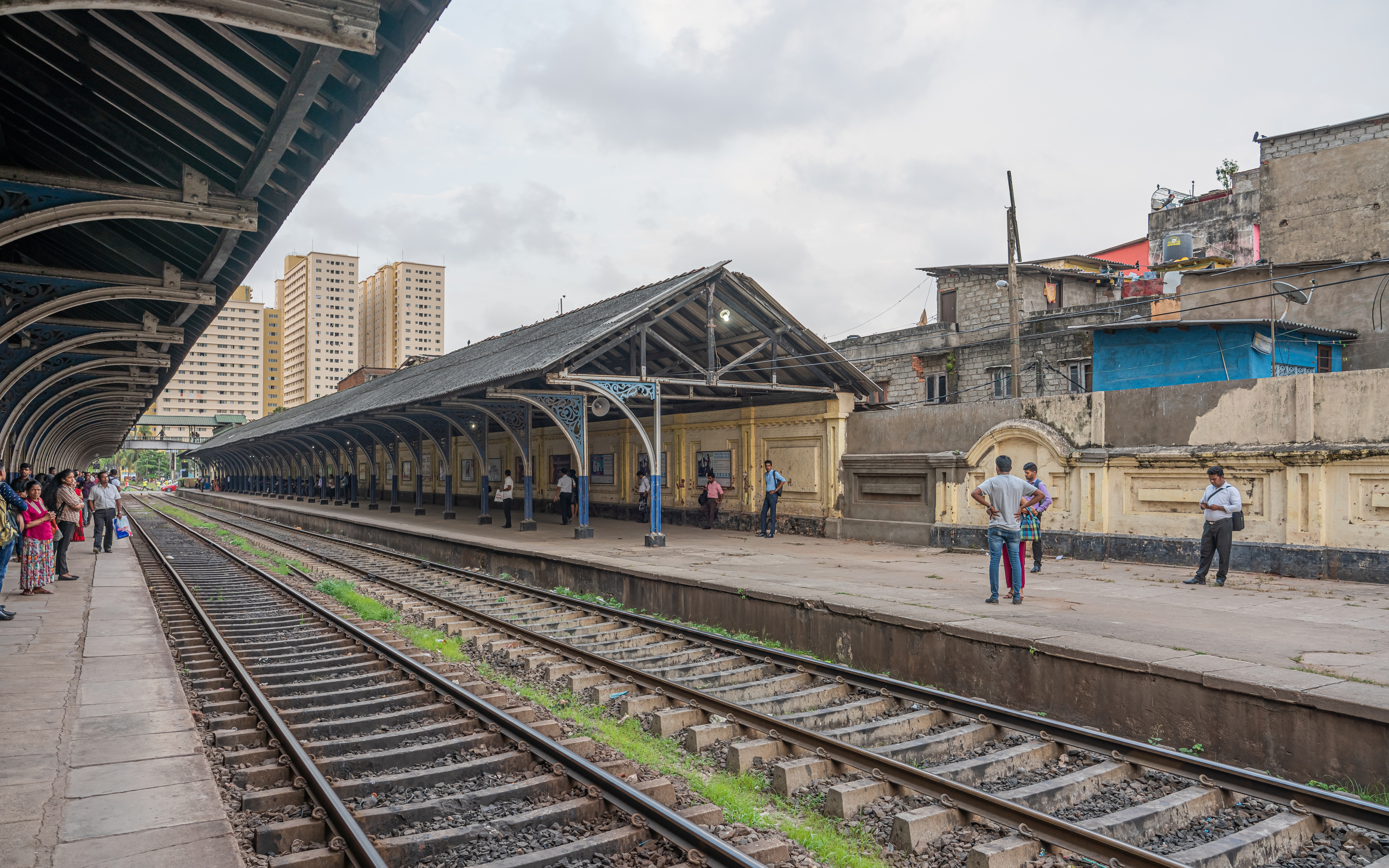
- Slave Island railway station is located within, nearby or associated with the Slave Island Grama Niladhari Division
- Interactive map of Slave Island
- Coordinates: 6.925199°N 79.850861°E
- Country: Sri Lanka
- Province: Western Province
- District: Colombo District
- Divisional Secretariat: Colombo Divisional Secretariat
- Electoral District: Colombo Electoral District
- Polling Division: Colombo Central Polling Division

Area
  - Total: 0.13 km^{2} (0.050 sq mi)
- Elevation: 17 m (56 ft)

Population (2012)
  - Total: 3,795
  - Density: 29,192/km^{2} (75,610/sq mi)
- ISO 3166 code: LK-1103130

Slave Island

Slave Island Grama Niladhari Division is a Grama Niladhari Division of the Colombo Divisional Secretariat of Colombo District of Western Province, Sri Lanka.

Slave Island railway station, Slave Island, SLAF Colombo, Old Army Headquarters, Colombo, Victoria Masonic Temple, Beira Lake, Union Place, Ceylon Electricity Board, Ceylon Chamber of Commerce and One Galle Face are located within, nearby or associated with Slave Island.

Slave Island is a surrounded by the Fort, Wekanda, Ibbanwala, Hunupitiya and Galle Face Grama Niladhari Divisions.

== Demographics ==
=== Ethnicity ===
The Slave Island Grama Niladhari Division has a Moor majority (52.2%), a significant Sri Lankan Tamil population (17.6%), a significant Sinhalese population (15.8%) and a significant Malay population (12.8%). In comparison, the Colombo Divisional Secretariat (which contains the Slave Island Grama Niladhari Division) has a Moor plurality (40.1%), a significant Sri Lankan Tamil population (31.1%) and a significant Sinhalese population (25.0%)

Ethnicity in Slave Island
1. Moor (52.2%)
2. Sri Lankan Tamil (17.6%)
3. Sinhalese (15.8%)
4. Malay (12.8%)
5. Indian Tamil (1.30%)
6. Other (0.40%)

=== Religion ===
The Slave Island Grama Niladhari Division has a Muslim majority (69.7%), a significant Buddhist population (14.4%) and a significant Hindu population (10.5%). In comparison, the Colombo Divisional Secretariat (which contains the Slave Island Grama Niladhari Division) has a Muslim plurality (41.8%), a significant Hindu population (22.7%), a significant Buddhist population (19.0%) and a significant Roman Catholic population (13.1%)

Religion in Slave Island
1. Muslim (69.7%)
2. Buddhist (14.4%)
3. Hindu (10.5%)
4. Roman Catholic (4.50%)
5. Other (0.90%)

== Gallery ==
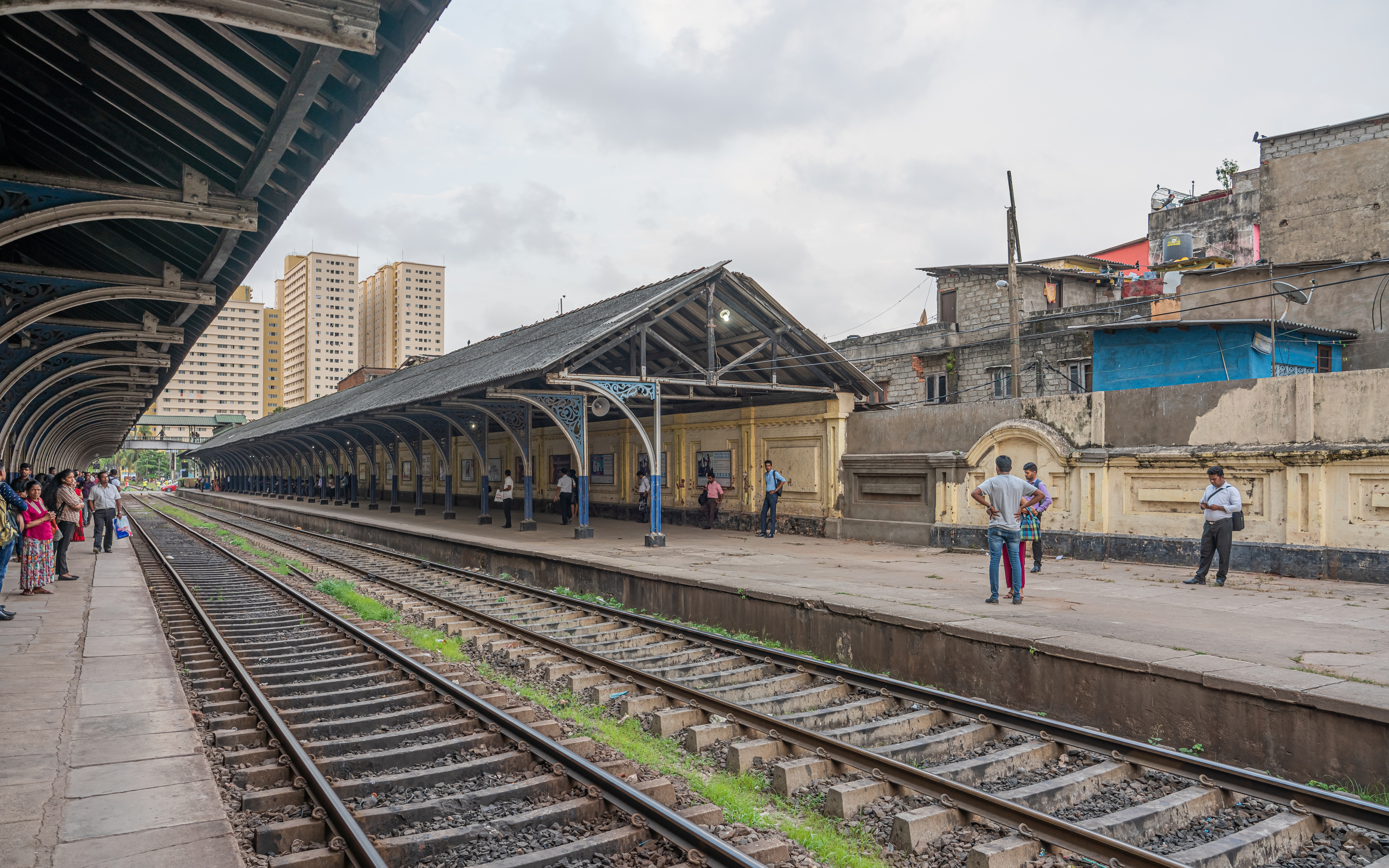
Slave Island railway station

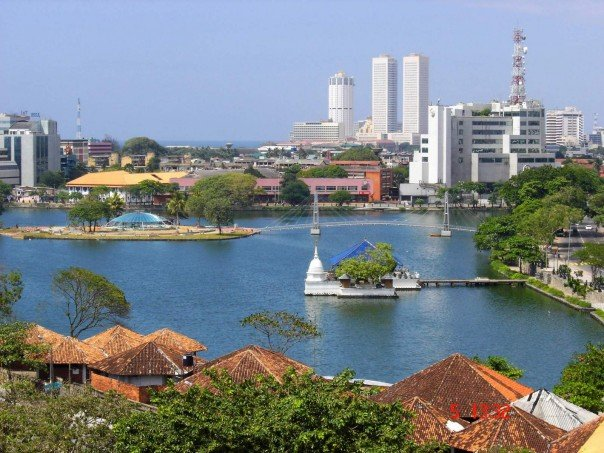
Slave Island

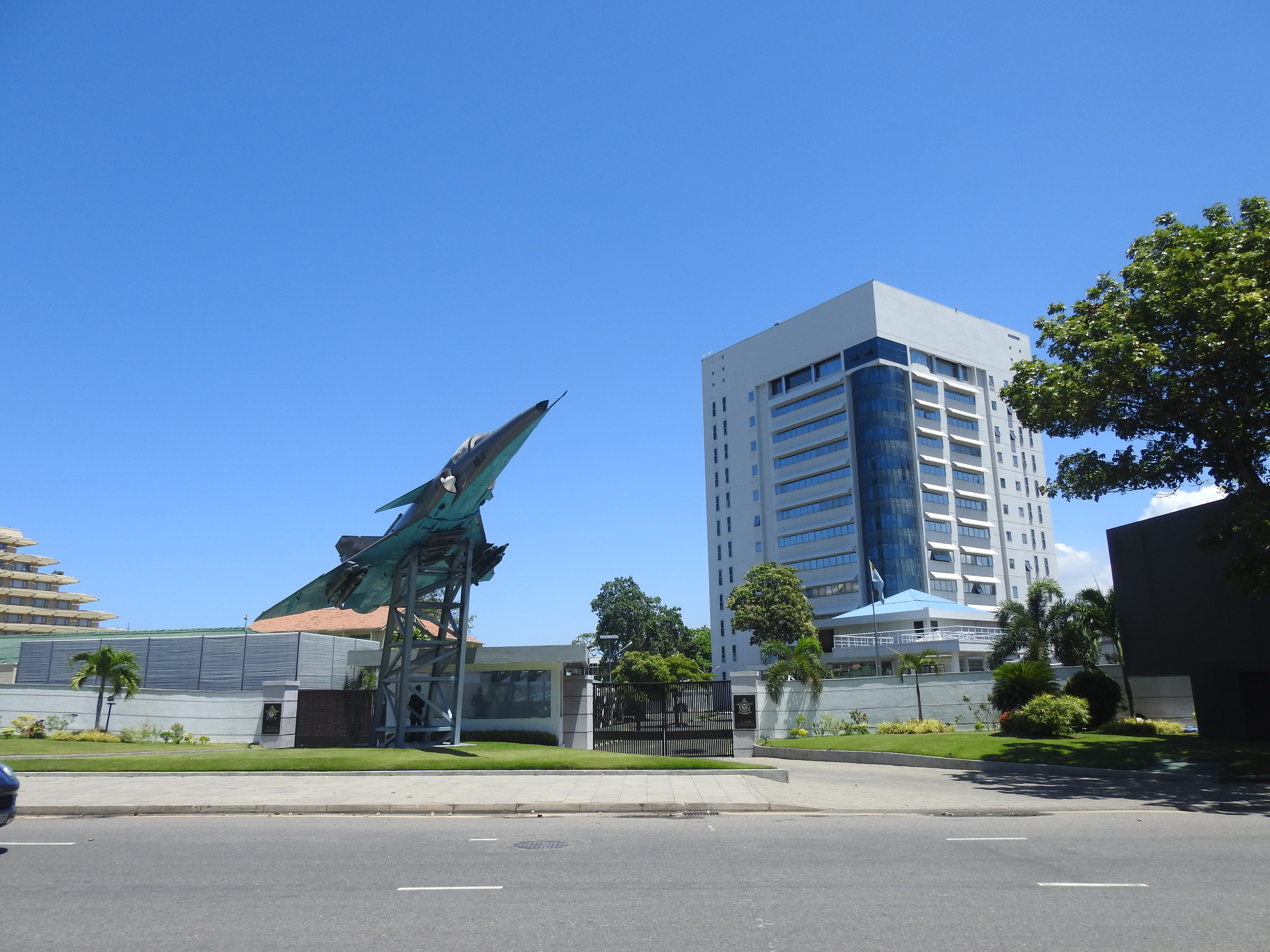
SLAF Colombo

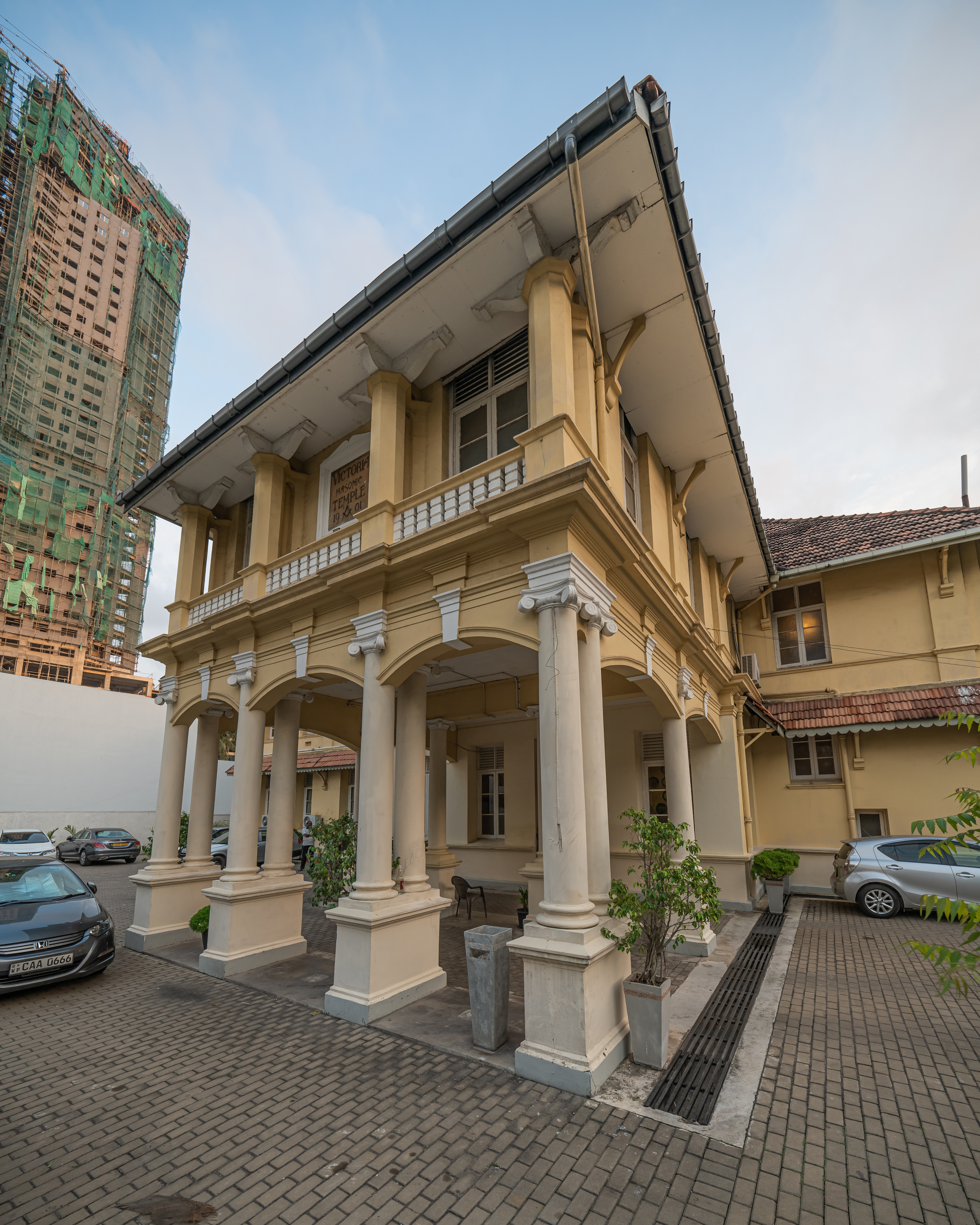
Victoria Masonic Temple

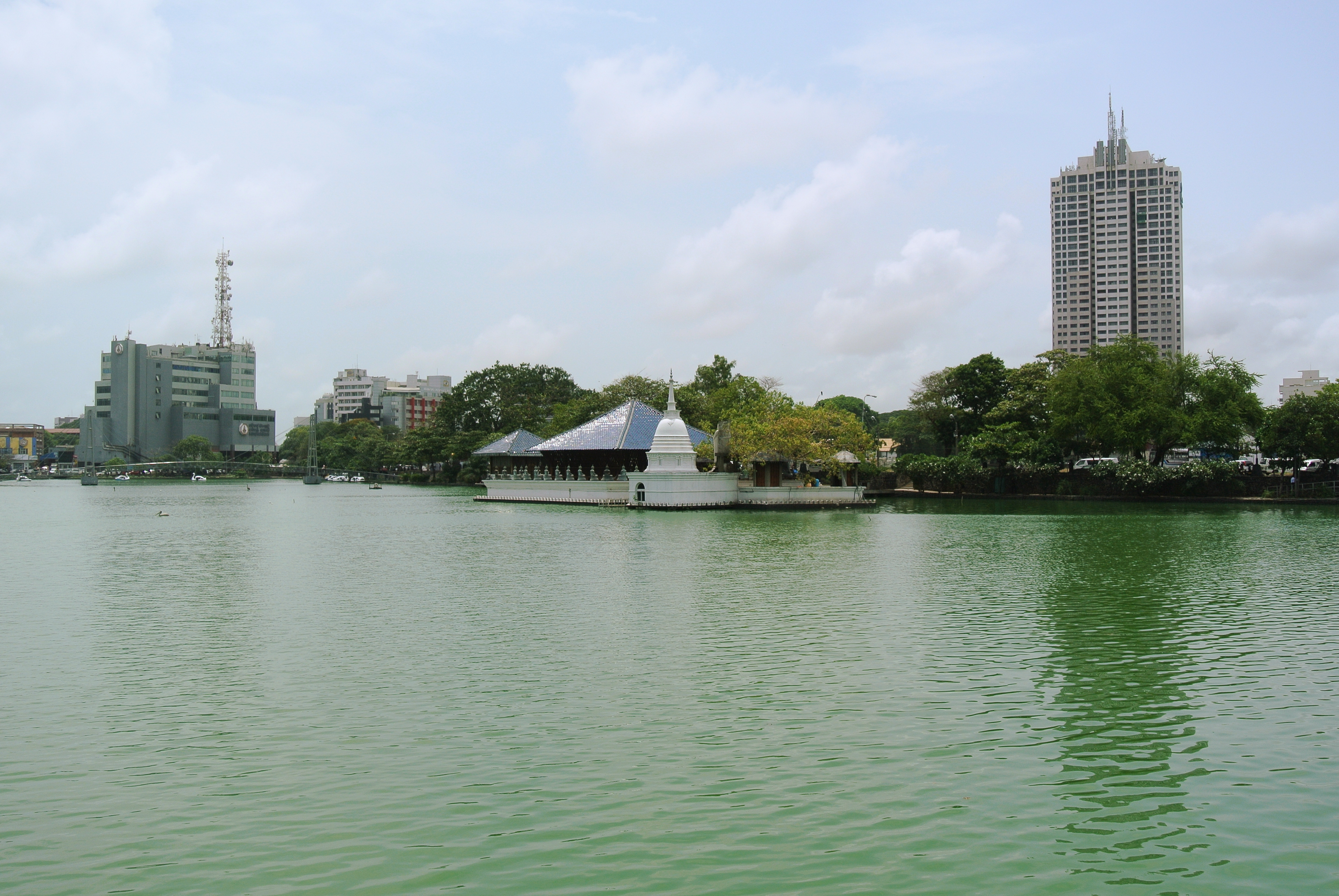
Beira Lake

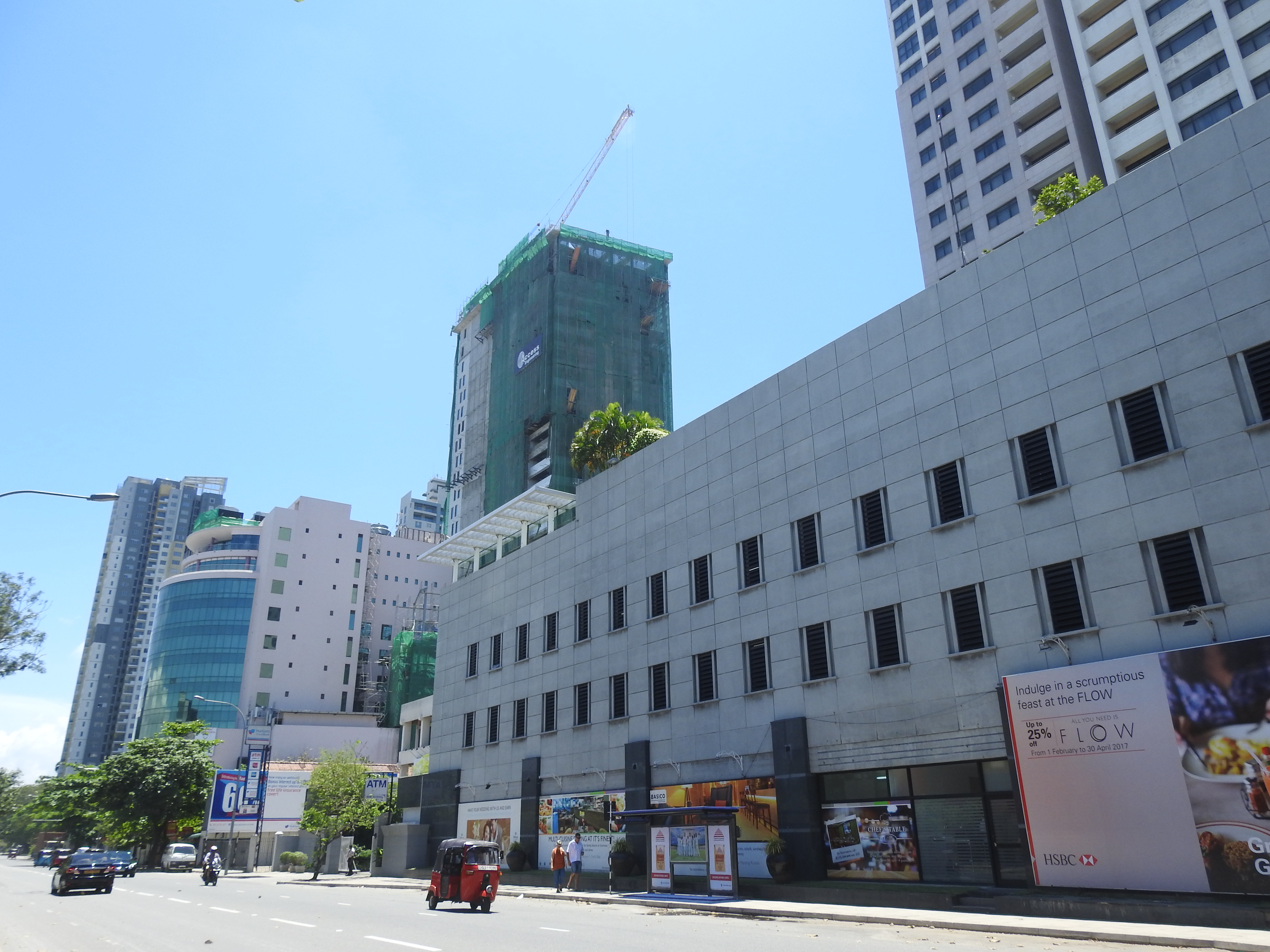
Union Place

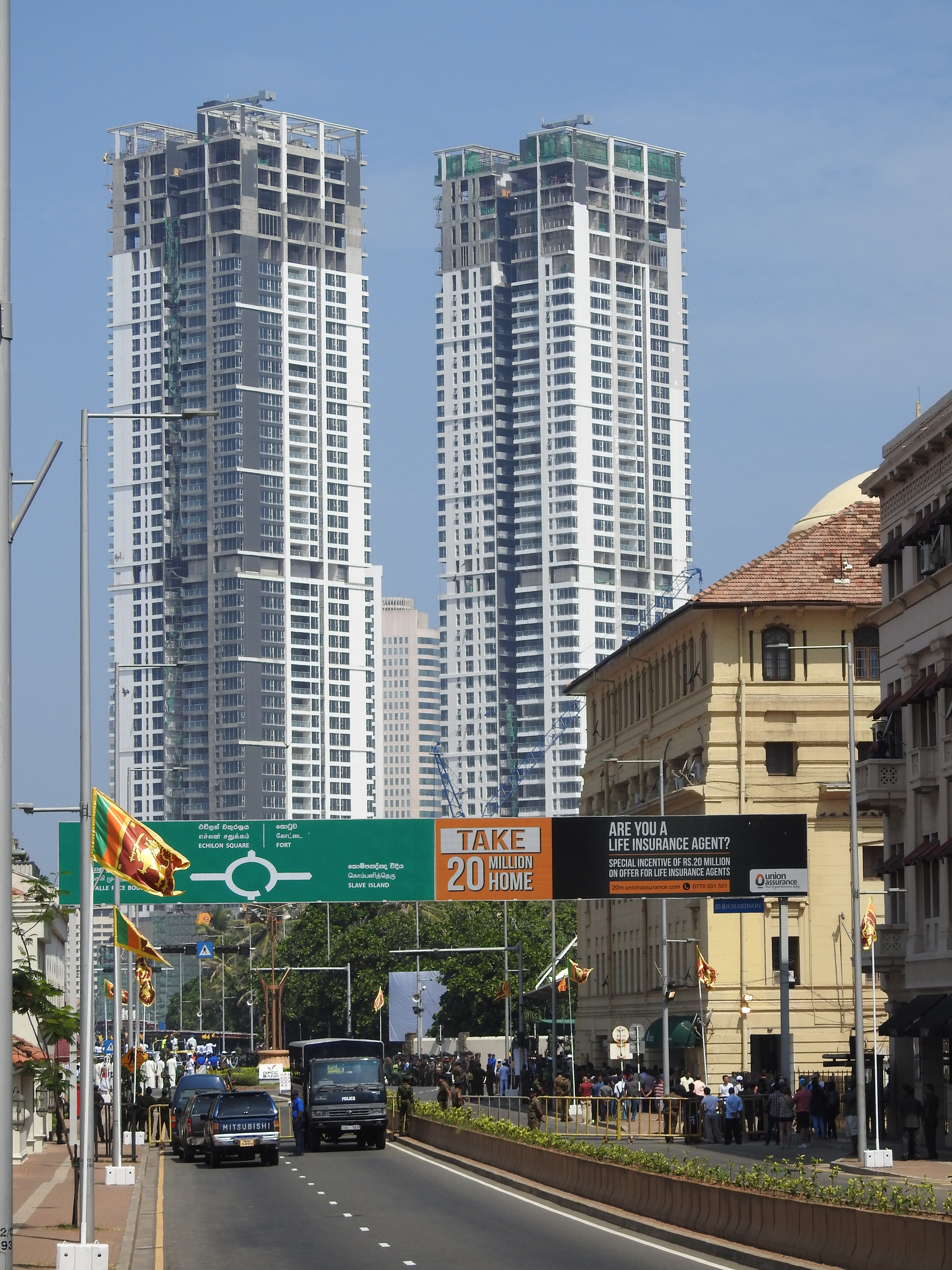
One Galle Face
