= McCallum Lock Gates =

McCallum Lock Gates Bridge
- Carries: vehicle traffic
- Maintained by: Trailnet

History
- Opened: 1956; 69 years ago

The McCallum Lock Gates comprise a bridge over a set of lock gates connecting East Beira Lake and the Colombo Harbour. Built between 1951 and 1956 by the Colombo Public Works Department to facilitate barge traffic between ships docked in the harbour and ports on the Kalani river. The bridge connected the Fort to the D.R. Wijewardena Mawatha.

Opened by Sir John Kotelawala, Prime Minister of Ceylon, one of the designed engineers in involved in its design was A. N. S. Kulasinghe then a harbour engineer. In 2011 the lock which had fallen out of use was rehabilitated as part of the Metro Colombo Urban Development Project.
