= Edward Skinner (architect) =

- Born: 15 March 1869; Inverurie, Scotland
- Died: 26 December 1910 (aged 41); Colombo, Ceylon
- Occupation: Architect
- Spouse: Olive Minna née Martin (1881–1917)
- Parent: James

Edward Skinner (15 March 1869 – 26 December 1910) was a British architect who was responsible for designing a number of landmark buildings in Ceylon.

Edward Skinner was born on 15 March 1869 in Inverurie, Scotland. In 1885 he was articled to John Rust. He left to join a London based architectural practice in 1890, serving as an assistant to Morton M. Glover from 1891 to 1892. In 1893 he passed his architectural qualifying exam and was admitted to the Royal Institute of British Architects on 4 December.

Skinner emigrated to Ceylon before the end of 1893 working as an assistant to an engineering firm before commencing his own architectural practice in 1897. He was responsible for designing a number of buildings in Colombo, including the south wing of the Galle Face Hotel (1894), Victoria Masonic Temple (1901), Cargills & Co. (1902), Victoria Memorial Eye Hospital (1903), Lindsay Lecture Hall, St. Andrew's Church (1906), Wesley College (1907) and Lloyd's Building (1908). On 7 June 1909 he was admitted as a fellow of the Royal Institute of British Architects.

Skinner committed suicide at his offices in Colombo fort on 26 December 1910.
