= Victoria Masonic Temple =

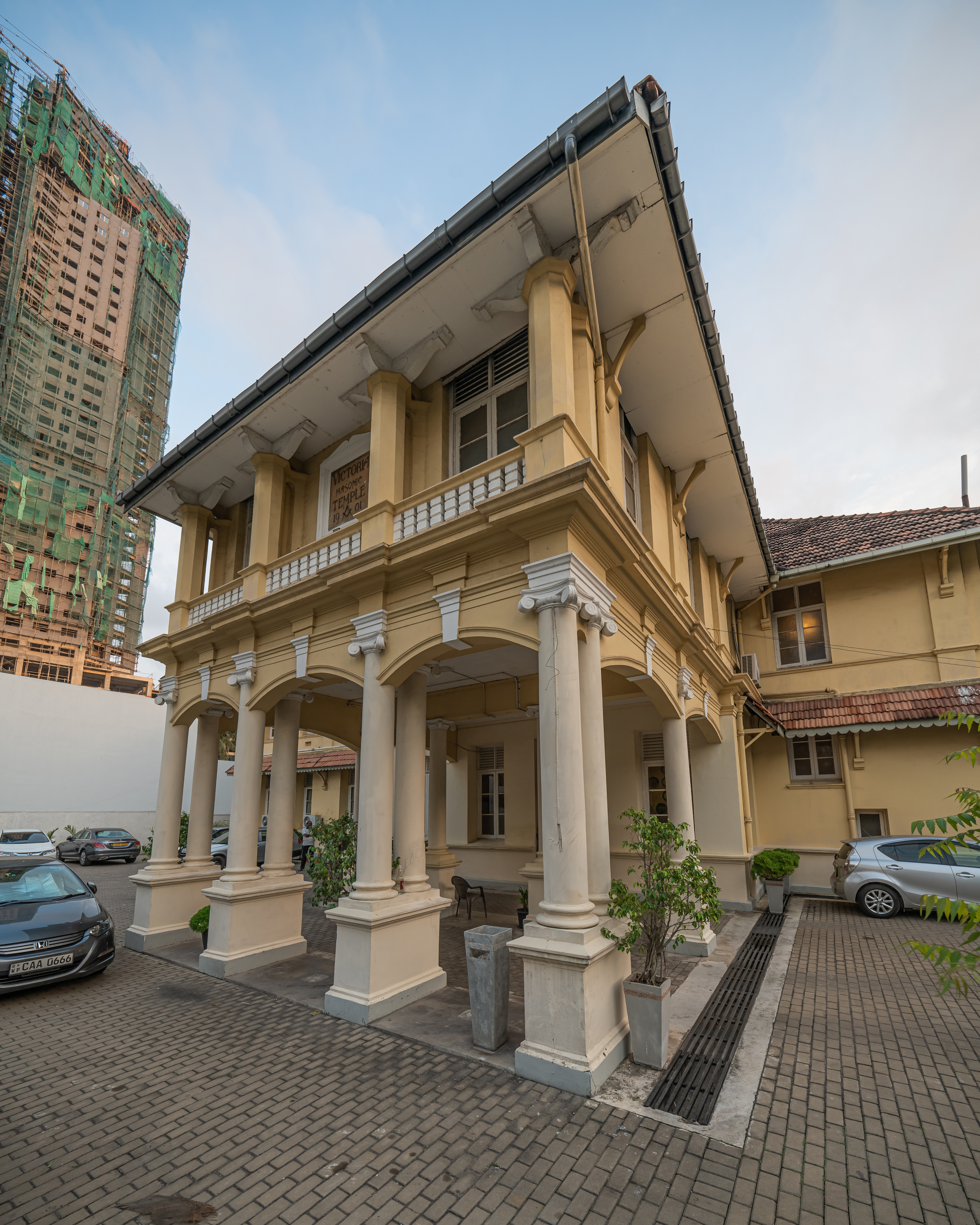

- Location within Central Colombo

General information
- Architectural style: Neo-Georgian
- Location: 60 Sir Mohamed Macan Markar Mawatha, Colombo, Sri Lanka
- Coordinates: 6°55′22.5″N 79°50′52.4″E
- Current tenants: District Grand Lodge of Sri Lanka of the United Grand Lodge of England, Provincial Grand Lodge of Ireland in Sri Lanka, Superintendency of the Grand Lodge of Scotland in Sri Lanka.
- Groundbreaking: 27 September 1900
- Completed: August 1901
- Opened: 1 September 1901; 125 years ago
- Renovated: 1928
- Cost: Rs. 45,105
- Renovation cost: Rs. 6,800

Design and construction
- Architect: Edward Skinner
- Main contractor: Colombo Commercial Company

Renovating team
- Main contractor: Walker Sons and Company

The Victoria Masonic Temple in Colombo, Sri Lanka is the meeting place for the Masonic Lodges in the Colombo area. It was built in 1901 during British rule.

Freemasonry was first introduced by the Dutch with the establishment of a masonic lodge, Fidelity Lodge, in Colombo in 1771 by the Grand Lodge of Holland, followed by a second lodge in Galle in 1773 and another lodge in Colombo in 1794. In 1795 the British took possession of all the Dutch settlements on the island and in 1801 Ceylon was formed as a separate Crown colony. On 9 February 1801 the officers of the 51st Regiment were issued a warrant by the Grand Lodge of Scotland to establish the Orange Lodge No. 274 in Colombo (it was dissolved in 1848), which was followed by No. 329 for the 6th Battalion in 1802 (dissolved in 1830) and No. 340 in September 1807 for the 34th Regiment of Foot but it is doubtful this lodge ever convened (dissolved November 1807). In 1822, the Taprobane Lodge was established in Ceylon under a provisional warrant from the United Grand Lodge of England, but was dissolved in June 1862. In the same year (1822), St. John's Lodge No. 628, was formed at Colombo by members of the St. Andrew's Union Lodge, which was attached to the 19th Regiment of Foot. In August 1838, the oldest existing lodge in the country, St. John's Lodge of Colombo No. 454, was formed.

In 1861 the Grand Lodge of Ireland established its first masonic lodge in Ceylon, Sphinx Lodge No. 107 and on 9 October 1878 formed a provincial Grand Lodge of Ceylon, which went into abeyance in 1890.

It was not until 1886, that the next English lodge was formed, the Lodge of St. George No. 2170 EC, which still exists actively in Colombo.

Masonic meetings at that time were held at the De Soysa Building, in Slave Island.

In 1897 a gathering of senior freemasons proposed the construction of a temple building in commemoration of Queen Victoria’s Diamond Jubilee but construction was delayed to accommodate the land acquisition, preparation of plans and the raising of funds. After the necessary funding was raised by subscription and debentures, the cornerstone of the building was laid on 27 September 1900 by John Norman Campbell, a freemason and a philanthropist, and the building was completed in August 1901 with a formal opening on 1 September 1901. The temple was designed by Edward Skinner, a Freemason and an associate of the Royal Institute of British Architects, and built by the Colombo Commercial Company. The building was built in neo-Georgian style mixed with elements of Eastern architecture. The Ceylon Independent stated on 2 October 1901:

The building was specially designed to meet all the requirements of the various degrees of Masonry which are worked locally. The Lodge room proper and its connected working and service rooms are all situated on the first floor while the ground floor consists of the Recreation Club Hall, service rooms, etc., all completely equipped. The large hall on the ground floor was specially built and the floor was constructed with the object of making it suitable for dancing. Its acoustic properties are likewise excellent and it makes a good room for a concert. This portion of the building was not restricted to Masons, and was hired by anyone wishing to give a concert or dance and the Committee has decided to fix the hire at the exceptionally low rate of Rs.25/- for a function so as to make the building popular. The internal fittings are of teak and brass and are of solid and durable character. The hall is brilliantly lit with special gas lamps and altogether no effort or expense has been spared to make the interior as comfortable as possible.

On 1 May 1907, the six English masonic lodges were consolidated under the auspices of the District Grand Lodge of Sri Lanka.

In 1914 it was resolved to construct a front porch with a room above on the northern side of the building however due to the outbreak of World War I the works were deferred. In 1928 the additions were built by Walker Sons and Company for Rs. 6,800.

In 2002, Sri Lanka Post featured the Victoria Masonic Temple on its Rs. 4.50 stamp to commemorate the centenary anniversary of the temple.

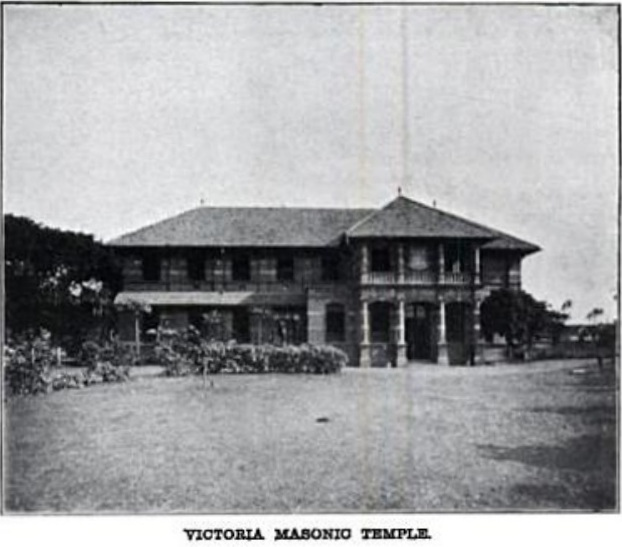
