= Kottarapattu Chattu Kuttan =

Sri Lankan doorman

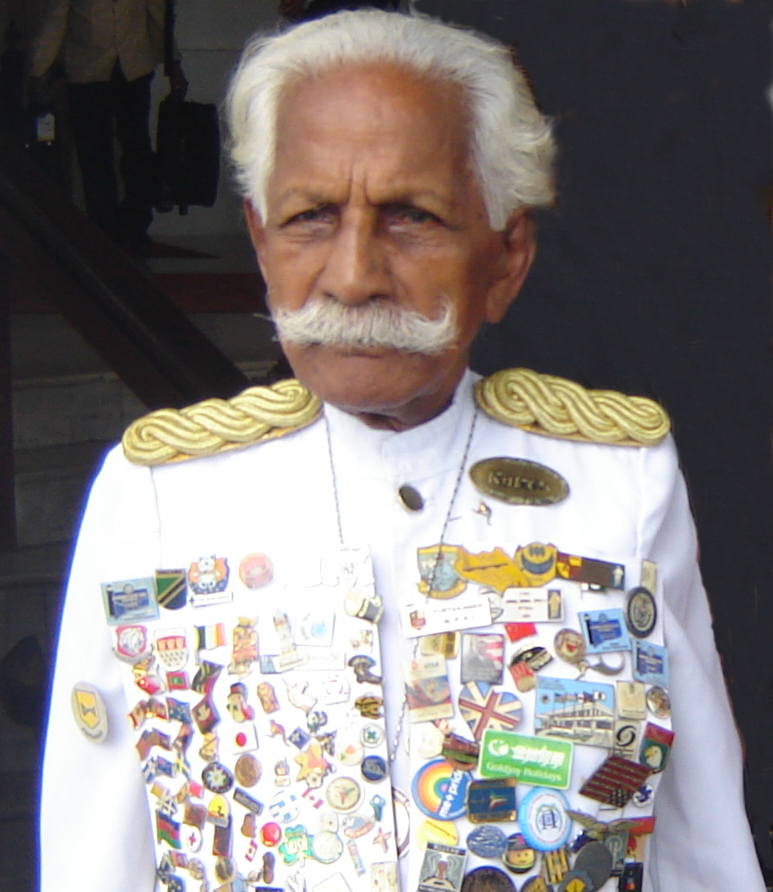
- Born: Kottarapattu Chattu Kuttan; 15 February 1920; Trichur, Kerala, India
- Died: 18 November 2014 (aged 94); Colombo, Sri Lanka
- Occupation: Doorman

Kottarapattu Chattu Kuttan (Sinhala: කොට්ටරපට්ටු චට්ටු කුට්ටන් Malayalam: കൊട്ടരപ്പാട്ട് ചാത്തു കുട്ടൻ) was an iconic Sri Lanka doorman at the Galle Face Hotel in Colombo. He is considered as one of the oldest and most famous hotel employees in the world. He became the trademark of Sri Lanka's hospitality industry and was known for his friendly manner, excellent memory for guests and white hair with a handlebar mustache. His photograph adorned the covers of many travel magazines all over the world.

He had been part of Galle Face Hotel's culture since 1942, working as a waiter, bell boy and finally as a doorman for seven decades.

== Early life ==
Kuttan was born in 1920 in the present day Kerala state of Southern India. At age 19, after his mother's death, Kuttan left home without telling his two brothers and three sisters. He arrived at the northern seaport town of Talaimannar of Sri Lanka (then Ceylon), by crossing the sea. He then made his way to Colombo in 1938, with 25 rupees and the clothes he was wearing.

In Colombo, before getting a job at Galle Face Hotel in 1942, he worked as a domestic servant for one of Colombo's elite families . He married a Sri Lankan Christian.

== Career at Galle Face Hotel ==
Kuttan started as a waiter, then became a bell boy, before finally becoming a doorman, continuing into his 90s. He hobnobbed with guests from all over the world and served many dignitaries.

== Death ==
After suffering a brief illness, Kuttan died on 18 November 2014 at the age of 94. He had amassed more than 72 years of hospitality service.

== Legacy ==
The image of K.C. Kuttan is the avatar for the chat feature on the Galle Face Hotel's website.
