= Ceylon Steel Corporation =

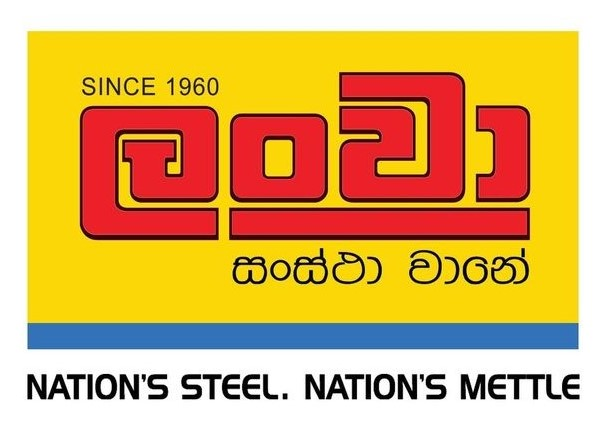
- Native name: ශ්‍රී ලංකා වානේ සංස්ථාව
- Company type: Public
- Industry: steel manufacturing
- Founded: 1962; 64 years ago
- Founder: Sirimavo Bandaranayake, Maithripala Senanayake
- Headquarters: Colombo, Sri Lanka
- Products: QT bars, BRC, GI pipes, GI mesh, hot dipped galvanizing, square tubes
- Owner: Sri Lanka Investment Corporation
- Subsidiaries: Lanwa Sanstha Cement Corporation
- Website: www.ceylonsteel.com

Ceylon Steel Corporation is one of the three industrial projects along with Ceylon Tyre Corporation and Ceylon Sugar Corporation, which were established in Sri Lanka by the support of Soviet Union during the Cold War era.

After winning the 1960 parliamentary election, Sirimavo Bandaranayake continued with the pro-socialist vision of her late husband and further strengthen Sri Lanka's relations with socialist countries. The Ceylon Steel Corporation was started in 1962 under the supervision of Maithripala Senanayake who was the Commerce and Industrial Minister of her government. A. N. S. Kulasinghe was appointed the first director of the organisation. In 1996 the organisation was sold to Hanjung Steel, now a member of the Doosan Group of South Korea during the period President Chandrika Bandaranayaka, who is the daughter of founder Sirimavo Bandaranayaka. In 2009 the company was acquired by the UAE-based Onyx Group which is owned by the Sri Lankan businessperson Sri Lanka Investment Corporation and re-branded as "Ceylon Steel" Corporation Limited. On 2020 Lanwa Sanstha announced they plan to build massive cement corporation under the name of Lanwa Sanstha Cement Corporation. The company aimed at 2.4 million tonnes of cement production in 2021. This facility is located in Mirijjawila Export Processing Zone, Hambantota. The investment for phase 1 of the project was estimated to be US$70 million.
