= Lloyd's Building, Colombo =

Lloyd's Building
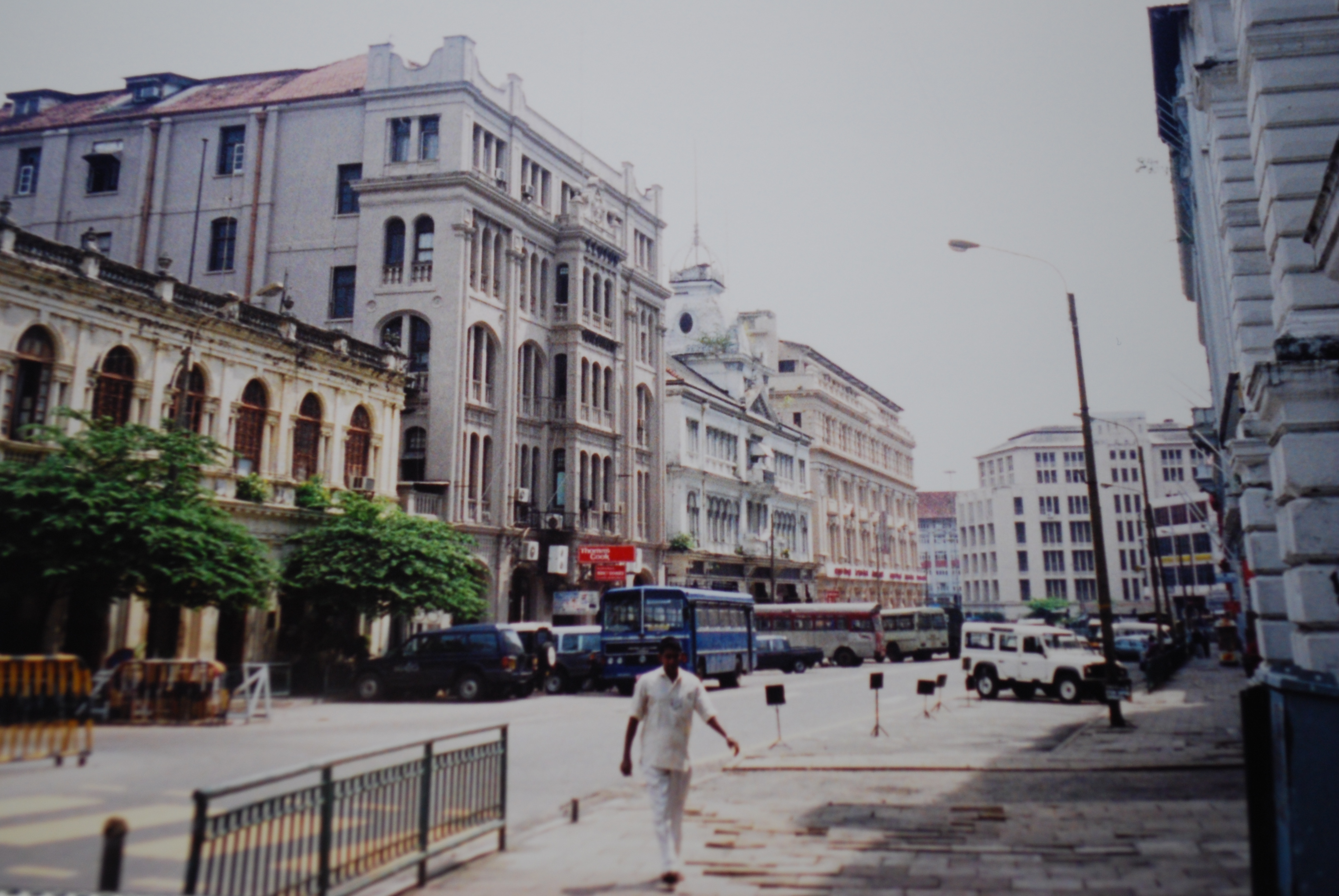

- Location within Central Colombo

General information
- Architectural style: Neo-Georgian
- Location: 13 Sir Baron Jayatilaka Mawatha, Colombo, Sri Lanka
- Coordinates: 6°56′11″N 79°50′38″E
- Current tenants: Employees' Provident Fund - Central Bank of Sri Lanka
- Opened: 1908; 118 years ago
- Renovated: 2011
- Owner: Central Bank of Sri Lanka

Technical details
- Floor count: five (with a basement)
- Floor area: 2,787 m^{2} (30,000 sq ft)

Design and construction
- Architect: Edward Skinner
- Main contractor: Clifford Lake and Company

Renovating team
- Main contractor: Sanken Construction (Pvt) Ltd

Lloyd's Building is a prominent five-storey 19th century building located on Sir Baron Jayatilaka Mawatha (formerly Prince Street), Colombo Fort.

The building was constructed in 1908 and originally named the 'Freudenberg Building'. It was designed by Edward Skinner and constructed by Clifford Lake and Company.

Initially, the main occupant of the building was Freudenberg and Company, an import and export company. Freudenberg and Company was established on 1 July 1873 by Philipp Freudenberg, initially as a coffee trading company but it went onto expand into banking, imports and exports, oil milling, as well as being the agency for a number of German shipping companies, including Norddeutscher Lloyd and the Deutsche Ost-Africa Linie Steamship Company. Freudenberg also served as the Imperial German Consul to Ceylon from 1876 to 1906. By 1917 several floors of the building were leased out to Colombo Apothecaries Company Ltd, Shanghai Life Insurance Company, Morrison and Bell, Standard Oil Company, C. W. Mackie and Company, Clark Young and Company, Vacuum Oil Company and the Consul for the United States of America. In 1918 it was purchased by Aitken Spence (the sole agent of Lloyd's of London in Ceylon) and made it the company's headquarters, renaming it the Lloyd's Building.

In 1933, the joint owners of the building, Ian Woodford Aitken, Henry Seymour Jeaffreson, Basil Walter Cuthbert Leefe and Walter Edward Moncrieff Paterson, sold the building to Ceylon and General Properties Ltd. In 1950 ownership of the building was transferred to Badrawathie Fernando Estate Ltd and subsequently in 1957 to United Ceylon Insurance Company Ltd.

In 2009 the Central Bank of Sri Lanka purchased the building, to address the needs of the bank's growing office. The renovated building was officially opened on 1 June 2011 by Gotabaya Rajapaksa, Secretary to the Ministry of Defence and Urban Development, and Ajith Nivard Cabraal, Governor of the Central Bank.

This building signifies British architectural heritage of the late 19th century. The richly decorated conference room, elegant marble corridors, classical motifs, quaint woodwork and attractive exterior design of the building symbolise the commercial heyday of the early 20th century in Ceylon.
