= Walker Sons and Company =

- Company type: Public
- ISIN: LK0099N00008
- Industry: Conglomerate
- Genre: Engineering
- Founded: 1854; 172 years ago
- Founder: John Walker
- Headquarters: 18 St. Michel's Road, Colombo, Sri Lanka
- Key people: John Walker (founder); Shiva Narayan (chairman)
- Products: General Engineering; Mechanical Engineering; Civil Engineering; Piling
- Owner: MTD Capital Berhad

Walker Sons and Company was a Sri Lankan engineering firm established in Kandy in 1854 by a Scottish engineer, John Walker, as John Walker and Co. It was the seventh oldest operating company in Sri Lanka. Today, the name operates as an investment holding company under the umbrella of the MTD Walkers group, but ceased operations in its original form in the 1980s.

John Walker was born 24 August 1819 in Doune, Scotland the seventh child of James Walker, a cobbler, and Christina née Strang. He attended school in Deanston and was apprenticed in the engineering shop of Deanston cotton mill, operated by James Finlay and Company. In 1842 he travelled to Ceylon to work as an engineer for Wilson, Ritchie and Co. Over the next 12 years Walker worked as an engineer for a number of firms in Ceylon before returning to Scotland in 1854. In Scotland Walker met up with William Turner, an engineer whom he had known in Ceylon, who encouraged him to return to Ceylon to work with his engineering business in Kandy. Walker established his own engineering firm, John Walker & Co., at Trincomalee Street in Kandy manufacturing machinery for the colony's rapidly developing coffee industry. This included the invention of a disc pulping machine, patented in 1860, which was exported to other coffee producing countries. In 1862 his brother William joined him as a partner in the company. In 1870 they opened branches in Badulla and Haldummulla, which were followed by branches in Dikoya and Dimbula in 1873. Walker founded a new company, Walker and Greig in 1873 to supply machinery to the new tea plantations after a blight destroyed most of the coffee plantations in the country. The business also diversified into marine engineering, building and construction. In 1880 the company manufactured the first tea rolling machine and developed the Colombo Pressure Dryer, which is still in use in some tea estates today. The same year the company relocated their headquarters from Kandy to Colombo and Walker retired to Scotland but retained his business interests in Ceylon until his death in 1888. Following Walker's death, his son John, came out to Ceylon and took over the company. In 1891 the firm was incorporated as a limited liability company, Walker Sons and Company, and registered on the London Stock Exchange.

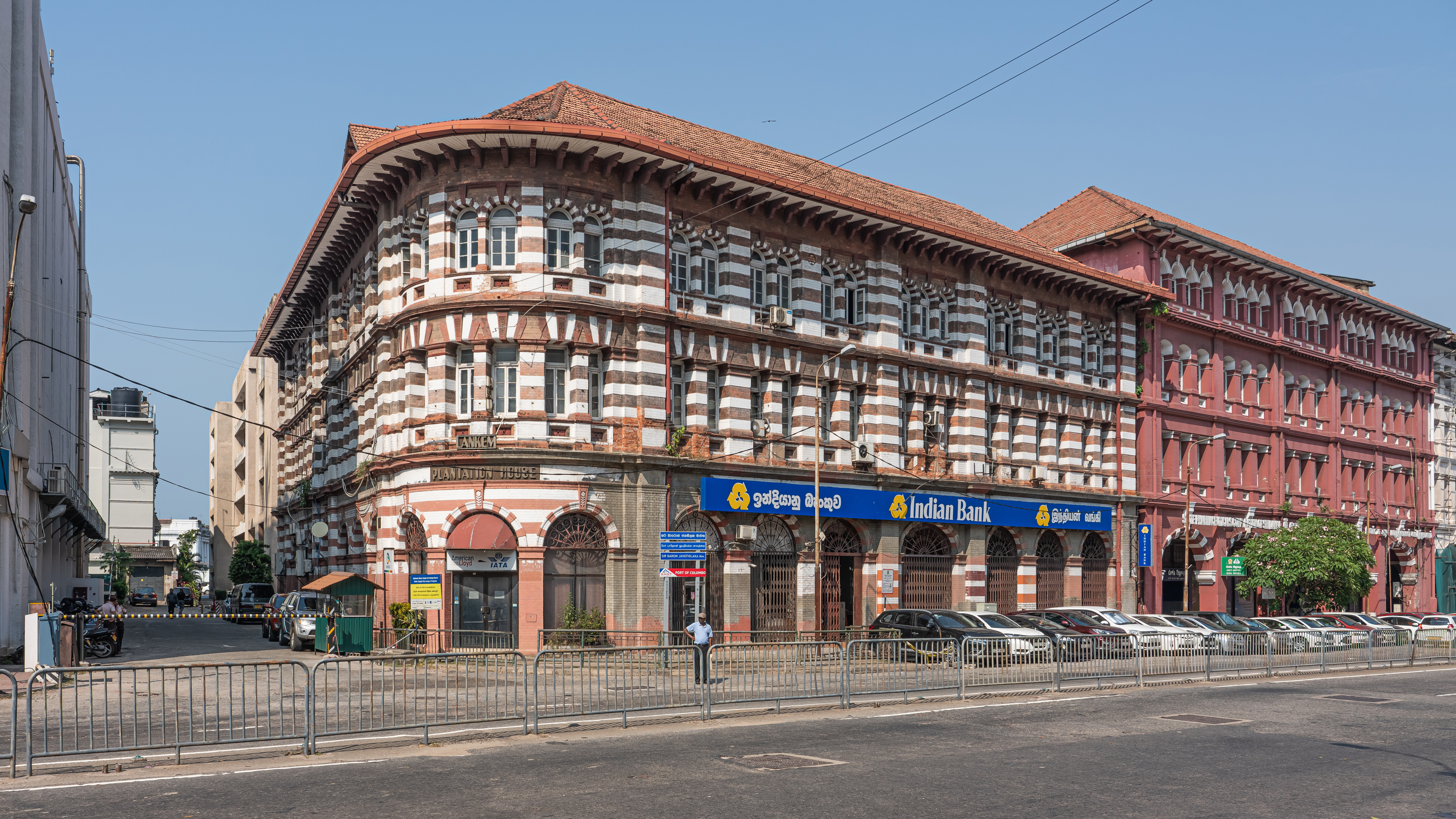

Walker and Sons were occupying a small building at the northern end of Prince Street (now known as Sir Baron Jayathilaka Mawatha), which they demolished and constructed a large elegant three storied building completed in 1911. This polychrome ("blood-and-bandage") brick building housed the company's general offices, retail stores and engineering works.

The company diversified with a construction arm which at the turn of the century were responsible for constructing a number of landmark buildings in Colombo, including: the Galle Face Hotel; Cargills Building; Australia Buildings; Whiteaway, Laidlaw & Co Building; P&O Building; Parliament Building; National Bank of India Building; Hong Kong and Shanghai Bank Building; Times of Ceylon Building; the Grandstand at the Colombo Racecourse; Chartered Bank Building; a number of stately homes in the city and in the 1950s the Ceylinco House Building.

In 1902 the company established a motor division, importing the first cars, twenty Austins into the country. In the same year the company installed Ceylon's first passenger lift in the Galle Face Hotel. In 1911 they installed the country's first air-conditioning system in a 10-room office in Colombo.

During the Second World War the firm repaired and refitted 167 major warships, 322 minor warships and 1,932 merchant vessels, including the aircraft carrier HMS Eagle, cruisers HMS Cornwall, HMS Cumberland, HMS Devonshire, HMS Gloucester, HMS Kent, HMS Manchester, HMS Liverpool and cruise liners RMS Queen Elizabeth and RMS Queen Mary.

Walker Sons continued to be controlled by the Walker family until the 1970s, when it was sold to the Tata Group, an Indian conglomerate. In 1977, due to the influx of cheap Japanese cars into the local market, the company closed its motor vehicle department. The company was purchased by Kapila Heavy Equipment for Rs. 11 million in 1990.

In 2006 the company acquired CML Edwards Construction Ltd. and was restructured to form Walkers CML. In 2009, MTD Capital Berhad, a Malaysian investment holding company, acquired the Walkers Group of companies from Kapila Heavy Equipment, rebranding the group as MTD Walkers PLC. After years of financial difficulties, the company was delisted from the Colombo Stock Exchange on 1 December 2022.

== See also ==
- Jackson, A (2002). "Journal of Indian Ocean Studies". Refitting the Fleet in Ceylon: The War Diary of Walker Sons and Company. 10. Delhi, India: Society for Indian Ocean Studies.
