= Cargills (Ceylon) =

Sri Lankan retail, business, and restaurant company

Cargills (Ceylon) PLC
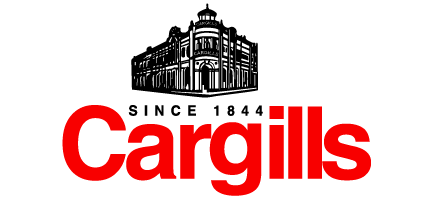
- Type: Public
- Traded as: CSE: CARG.N0000
- ISIN: LK0020N00004
- Industry: Retail; FMCG; Restaurants
- Founded: 1844; 182 years ago
- Founder: William Milne; David Sime Cargill
- Headquarters: No. 40, York Street Colombo 01, Colombo, Sri Lanka
- Area served: Sri Lanka
- Key people: Louis Page (Chairman); Ranjit Page (Deputy Chairman/CEO); Imtiaz Abdul Wahid (Group Managing Director)
- Products: FMCG Brands; Magic; Kotmale; Kist; Goldi; Knuckles; RIDE; Sara's; Retail Brands; Cargills Food City; Restaurants Brands; KFC Sri Lanka
- Revenue: ▲LKR273 billion (2026)
- Operating income: ▲LKR18.7 billion (2026)
- Net income: ▲LKR10.9 billion (2026)
- Total assets: ▲LKR145 billion (2026)
- Total equity: ▲LKR41 billion (2026)
- Number of employees: ▲11,300+ (2026)
- Parent: C T Holdings
- Website: www.cargillsceylon.com

Cargills (Ceylon) PLC is a Sri Lankan consumer company listed on the Colombo Stock Exchange. It primarily operates in the modern retail (supermarkets), FMCG, and restaurant industries, and is also involved in banking, real estate, agriculture and cinema operations. Cargills is among the top listed companies in Sri Lanka by market capitalization and operates the largest food related supply chain in the country.

== History ==
The company remodeled itself from a small department store network of 4 locations prior to 1983, in which year Cargills opened the first Food City supermarket in Colombo. In the years that followed, Cargills ventured into the FMCG and quick service restaurant space, successfully establishing itself as a leading player in each of the sectors.

=== The beginnings ===
In 1844 British businessman William Milne started Milne & Company, general warehousemen, importers of oilman stores etc, with branches in Kandy and Galle. In 1850 Milne was joined by his friend, David Sime Cargill, and the firm became Milne, Cargill & Co. In 1860, Milne retired from business in Ceylon and moved back to Scotland to form a company in Glasgow to look after the business of Cargill & Co. in the UK. Cargill became the sole partner until he was joined by David MacKenzie and the name was changed to Cargill & Co. The company had a Colombo office at the intersection of Price and York Streets in Colombo Fort, a Kandy office at Upper Lake Road and an office in Galle Fort at 22 Pedlar Street. The Galle office was closed down in 1863. In 1890 the business expanded with the purchase of Medical Hall, a chemist and druggist company. Cargills also established another company, Sime & Co., which sold lower quality goods. In 1896 Cargill & Co. was converted into a limited liability company registered in Glasgow. Two years later, the company bought James McLaren & Co.’s business in Nuwara Eliya, establishing a branch there.

=== The Cargills building at York Street, Colombo ===
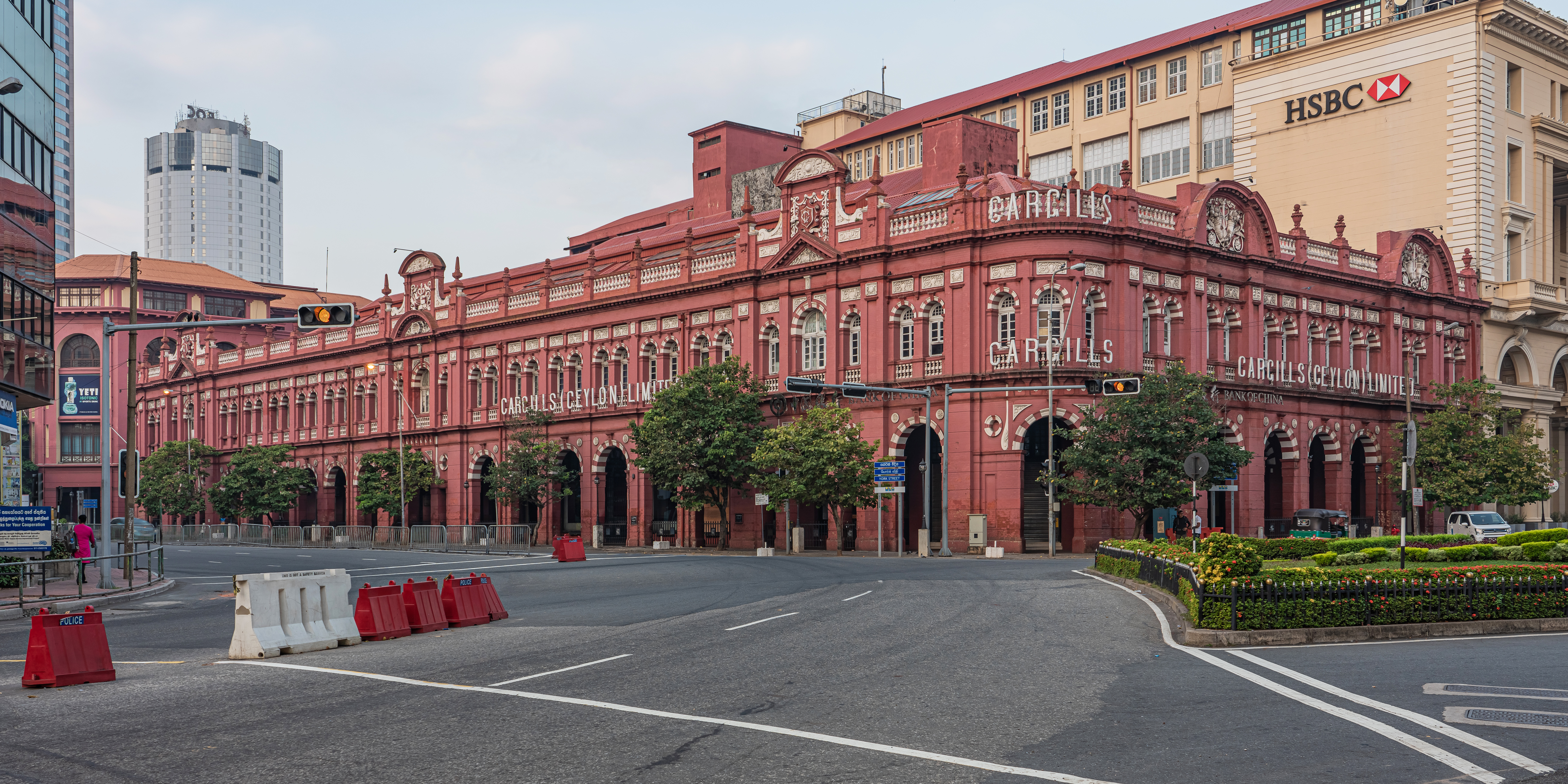
Historic Cargills building

The iconic Cargills building in the centre of Colombo Fort was originally the residence of Captain Pieter Sluysken, the former Dutch military commander of Galle. It was subsequently occupied by the first British Governor of Ceylon, Sir Frederick North, who lived there for a short time before moving to a spacious villa in Hulftsdorp. The building was acquired by Cargills in 1896, while D.S. Cargill was Chairman, Walter Hamilton was the Director and William Jenkins was the General Manager. Construction of the current building commenced in 1902, it was designed by Edward Skinner, built by Walker Sons and Company and completed in 1906. A foundation stone dated 1684 and a wooden statue of Minerva (Roman goddess of wisdom, arts and trade), both retrieved from the gable end of Sluysken's house, are preserved by the ground floor lift. By 1909 employed "an executive staff of 32 Europeans and 600 hands."

Following a successful bid by Sir Chittampalam A. Gardiner, the business was incorporated as a Public limited company on 1 March 1946.

=== Transformation ===
In 1981 Ceylon Theatres (now CT Holdings PLC) acquired a controlling interest in the company and Albert A. Page was appointed the Managing Director, and became Chairman in 1982.

Under the new management, Cargills explored the potential of innovating on its trading legacy. As a result, in 1983 Cargills established its first supermarket, with the opening of Cargills Food City at Staple Street, Colombo. In years to follow, Cargills expanded its supermarket chain across Sri Lanka.

Cargills ventured into the production of processed meats in 1993 when the Company invested in its first manufacturing facility, in Mattakkuliya. In 1994, Cargills obtained the local franchisee rights for KFC, setting up the first restaurant at the Majestic City shopping complex.

In 2002 it acquired a dairy processing plant and expanded its farmer outgrower network to include dairy farmers. The Magic ice cream brand was the outcome of this endeavour. In the same year, Cargills diversified into agri-processing with the acquisition of the Kist brand.

In 2010 Cargills undertook an aggressive expansion plan in the FMCG sector to ride the growth potential of a growing economy. During that year the Company expanded its interests in the dairy sector by acquiring Kotmale Holdings PLC and entered another growing category with the acquisition of a manufacturing plant, now marketed under the Kist brand.

In 2011, the Company secured a provisional commercial banking license from the Central Bank of Sri Lanka and commenced operations in 2014.

Cargills acquired the franchise license for T.G.I. Friday's and opened its first restaurant at Colombo Fort in October 2013. The restaurant was later relocated to the One Galle Face mall in Colombo. That same year, Cargills opened the first Cargills Square shopping mall in Jaffna, with the Group's brands being the anchor tenants. These shopping and entertainment malls consists of Cinemas, restaurants, and retail outlets. Cargills has opened five such shopping complexes to date, located in Jaffna, Gampaha, Dematagoda, Bandarawela, and Katubedda.

Cargills along with its parent company CT Holdings also own the Ceylon Theatres cinema business which operates the Regal and Majestic Cinemas.
