= Union Place =

Union Place යූනියන් පෙදෙස யூனியன் பிளேஸ்
- Suburb
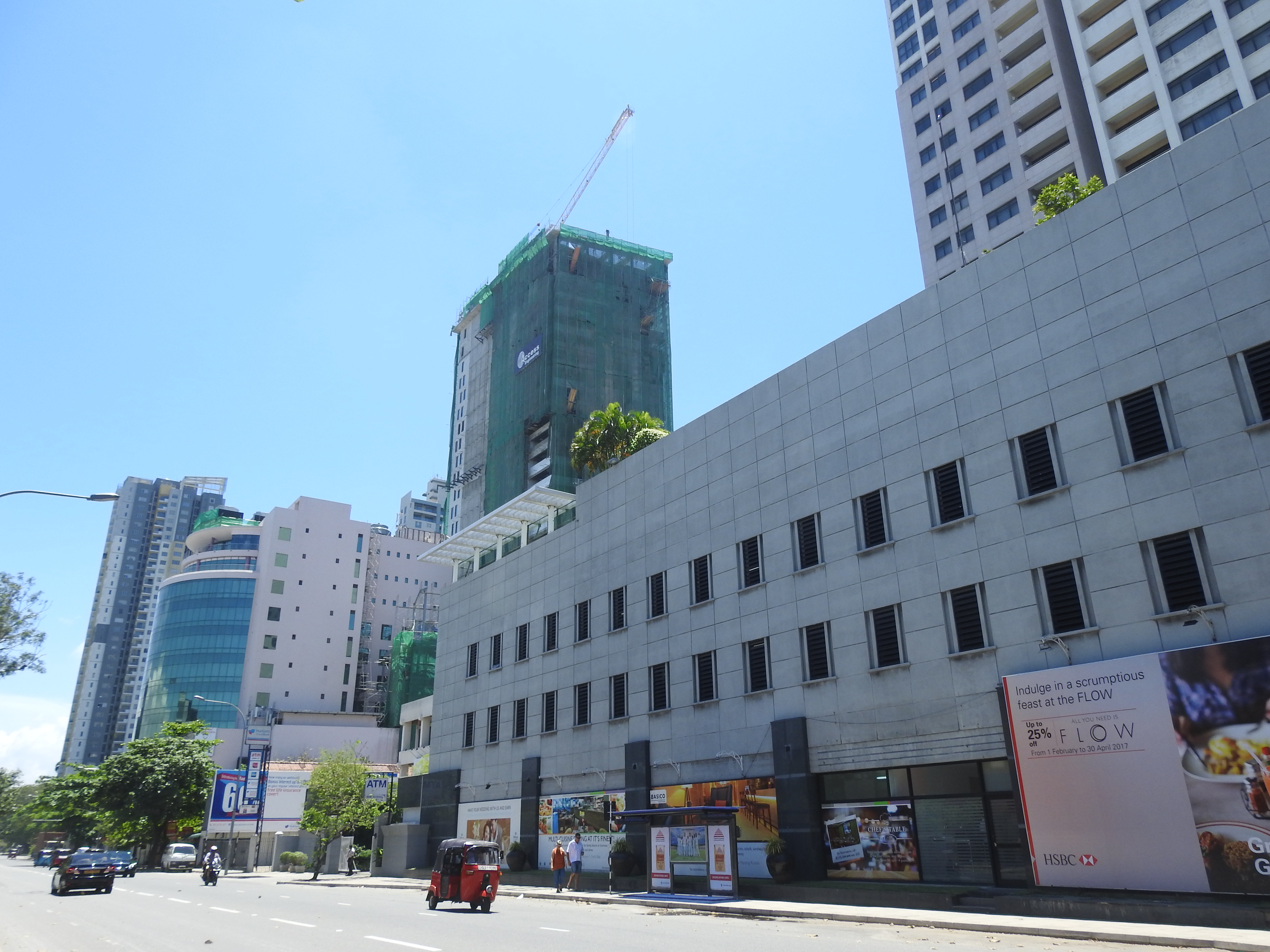
- Looking southwest on Union Place

- Location within Central Colombo Location within Greater Colombo Location within Colombo District Location within Sri Lanka
- Coordinates: 6°55′18″N 79°51′19″E
- Country: Sri Lanka
- Province: Western Province
- District: Colombo District
- Time zone: UTC+5:30 (Sri Lanka Standard Time Zone)
- Postal Code: 00200

Union Place is a suburb in Colombo, Sri Lanka. Union Place is located approximately 1 kilometre south-east from the centre of Colombo, Fort.

== Demographic ==
Union Place is a multi-religious and multi-ethnic area. The major ethnic communities in Union Place are Sinhalese and Sri Lankan Tamils. There are also various other minorities, such as Burghers, Sri Lankan Moors and others. Religions include Buddhism, Hinduism, Islam, Christianity and various other religions and beliefs to a lesser extent.

== Diplomatic missions ==
- Consulate of Austria
- Consulate of Bhutan
- Consulate of Namibia
- Consulate of Uruguay
- Consulate of Tunisia
- Consulate of Croatia
- Consulate of Czechia (Czech Republic)
