= A. N. S. Kulasinghe =

Sri Lankan civil engineer (1919–2006)

- Born: Arumadura Nandasena Silva Kulasinghe; 26 October 1919; Ja Ela Ceylon
- Died: 14 February 2006 (aged 86)
- Education: Maris Stella College, Negambo; St. Benedict's College, Colombo; Ceylon Technical College
- Occupations: Engineer, engineering administrator
- Known for: Innovations of low cost concrete technologies.
- Title: Deshabandu Dr
- Spouse: Dulcie de Silva
- Children: Upul, Harith
- Website: kulasinghe.com

Deshabandu Arumadura Nandasena Silva Kulasinghe (1919-2006) was a Sri Lankan Civil Engineer and founder of several engineering organisations in Sri Lanka.

== Early life and education ==
Kulasinghe was born in Udammita in Ja-Ela on 26 October 1919. He first studied at Wadduwa English Boys College and then moved to Mari Stella College, Negombo thereafter he entered to St. Benedicts' College Kotahena for his advanced level studies. He entered the Ceylon Technical College to study for the BSc in Engineering of the University of London, there he won the Sri Chandrasekera Scholarship. Graduating in 1936, he gained Associate Membership of the Institution of Civil Engineers (AMICE) in 1946.

== Career ==
In 1940, Kulasinghe joined the Norton Bridge Hydro Power Project as a Technical Assistant. In 1944, he joined Colombo Harbour as a junior assistant engineer. Kulasinghe focused on cost technologies, innovative construction techniques and utilisation of local resources in his Engineering pursuits. His pioneering efforts and contributions in the areas of Pre-cast concrete, Pre-stressed concrete, alternate low cost construction material, ferro-cement boat building, applications of the Shell design theory in the construction are applied in several key engineering structures in Sri Lanka.

In 1962 he became the founder chairman and general manager of the State Engineering Corporation of Ceylon while serving as Director of State Hardware Corporation, Ceylon Steel Corporation, Lanka Leyland Ltd., Colombo Low Lying Areas Reclamation Board, Ceylon Tyre Corporation and Council Member of Ceylon Bureau of Standards; Member, Board of Regents Vidyalankara University. Having been appointed as Chief Engineer, Colombo Port Commission in 1963 he was appointed Commissioner of the Colombo Port Commission in 1968. He retired from the State Engineering Corporation in 1971 and left the country returning in 1977.

He was a devout Buddhist and helped construct the Kotmale Mahaweli Maha Seya and the Buddha Jayanthi Chaithya at the Colombo harbour. Also, the Polgolla Bund, State Engineering Corporation head office and the Colombo Planetarium were also designed by Kulasinghe.

== Personal life ==
In 1946 Kulasinghe married Dulcie de Silva. They had two sons.

== Notable positions held ==
- Founder Chairman of the State Engineering Corporation of Sri Lanka
- Founder Chairman of the Central Engineering Consultancy Bureau of Sri Lanka
- Founder Chairman of the National Engineering Research and Development of Sri Lanka
- Chancellor of the Open University of Sri Lanka
- Founder Chairman of the Sri Lanka Association of the Institution of Civil Engineers
- President, of The Institution of Engineers, Sri Lanka in 1969
- President, National Academy of Sciences (1987)

== Honors and awards ==
- Fellow of the Institution of Civil Engineers (1957)
- Fellow of the Institution of Mechanical Engineers (1957)
- Fellow of the Institution of Engineers (India) (1960)
- Fellow of the Institution of Engineers, Sri Lanka (1960)
- Fellow of the National Academy of Sciences Sri Lanka (1975)
- President's Prize, the Institution of Engineers India, for best invention in prestressing (1960)
- Doctor of Science (Honoris Causa) from University of Moratuwa (1979)
- National Honour "Vidya Jyothi Class I" conferred by President Junius Richard Jayewardene on the Independence Commemoration Day, 4 February 1986
- Conferred the degree of Doctor of Engineering (Honoris Causa) by the Open University of Sri Lanka −2000
- Awarded the title Deshabandu by President Chandrika Kumaratunga −2005
- Kulasinghe Reservoir, Moragahakanda - named after him.
