= Galle Face Hotel =

Hotel in Colombo, Sri Lanka

Coordinates: 6.9200°N 79.8462°E

- Logo of Galle Face Hotel, Colombo

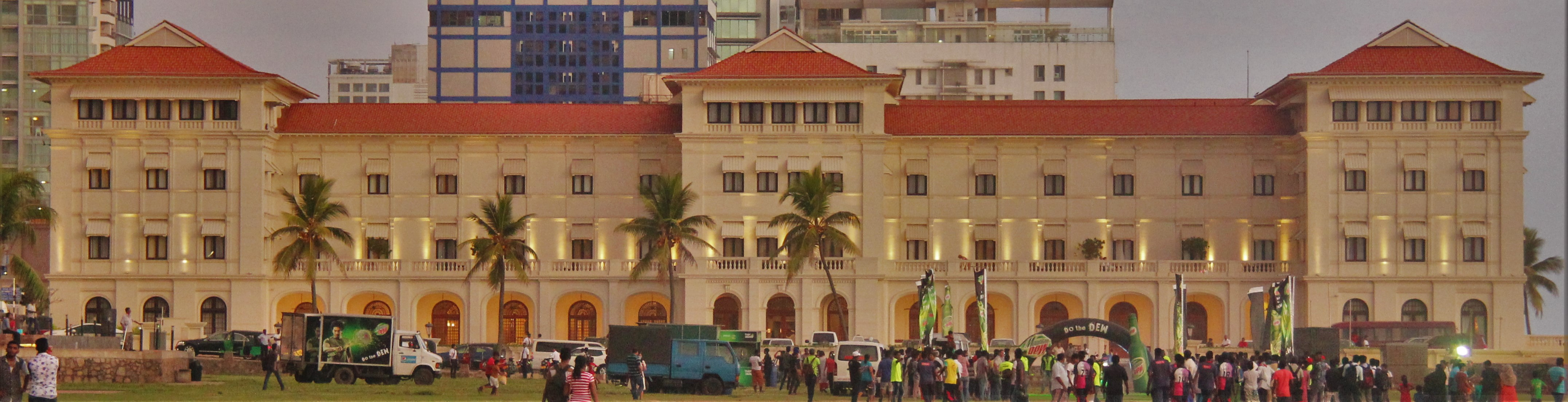
- Galle Face Hotel front view

General information
- Type: Hotel
- Location: Colombo, Sri Lanka
- Opened: 1864; 162 years ago

Other information
- Number of rooms: 156
- Number of restaurants: 5
- Number of bars: 1

Website
- www.gallefacehotel.com

The Galle Face Hotel, founded in 1864, is one of the oldest hotels east of Suez. It is located on Galle Road, Colombo. The Ceylon Hotels Corporation is now part of the Galle Face Hotel Group. The current chairman of the hotel is Sanjeev Gardiner, since the demise of his father Cyril Gardiner in 1997. It is listed as one of the "1000 Places to See Before You Die" in the book of the same name. It received the "Best Heritage Hotel" title three years running at the Presidential Awards for Travel and Tourism (of Sri Lanka), held in June 2010, June 2011 and September 2012. In addition it won the first-ever PATA award for Best International Heritage Hotel, in 2012. In September 2012, it became the first hotel in Sri Lanka to be featured on a postage stamp, along with three other iconic buildings in Colombo. In 2024 the hotel, under the leadership of Rohan Fernandopulle, won Best Hotel in ‘Rest of Asia’ at Condé Nast Traveller Reader’s Choice Awards, and three accolades at the Sri Lanka Tourism Awards: Best Heritage Hotel, Best Chef of the Year – Chef Rukmal Samarasekera, and Best Contemporary Fine Dining – Elevated Fusion Sri Lankan Cuisine – 1864 Limited Edition. The current General Manager is Suresh Abbas. Galle Face Hotel is the only hotel in Colombo with genuine beachfront access, thanks to its 19th-century heritage before the coastline filled up with development.

== History ==
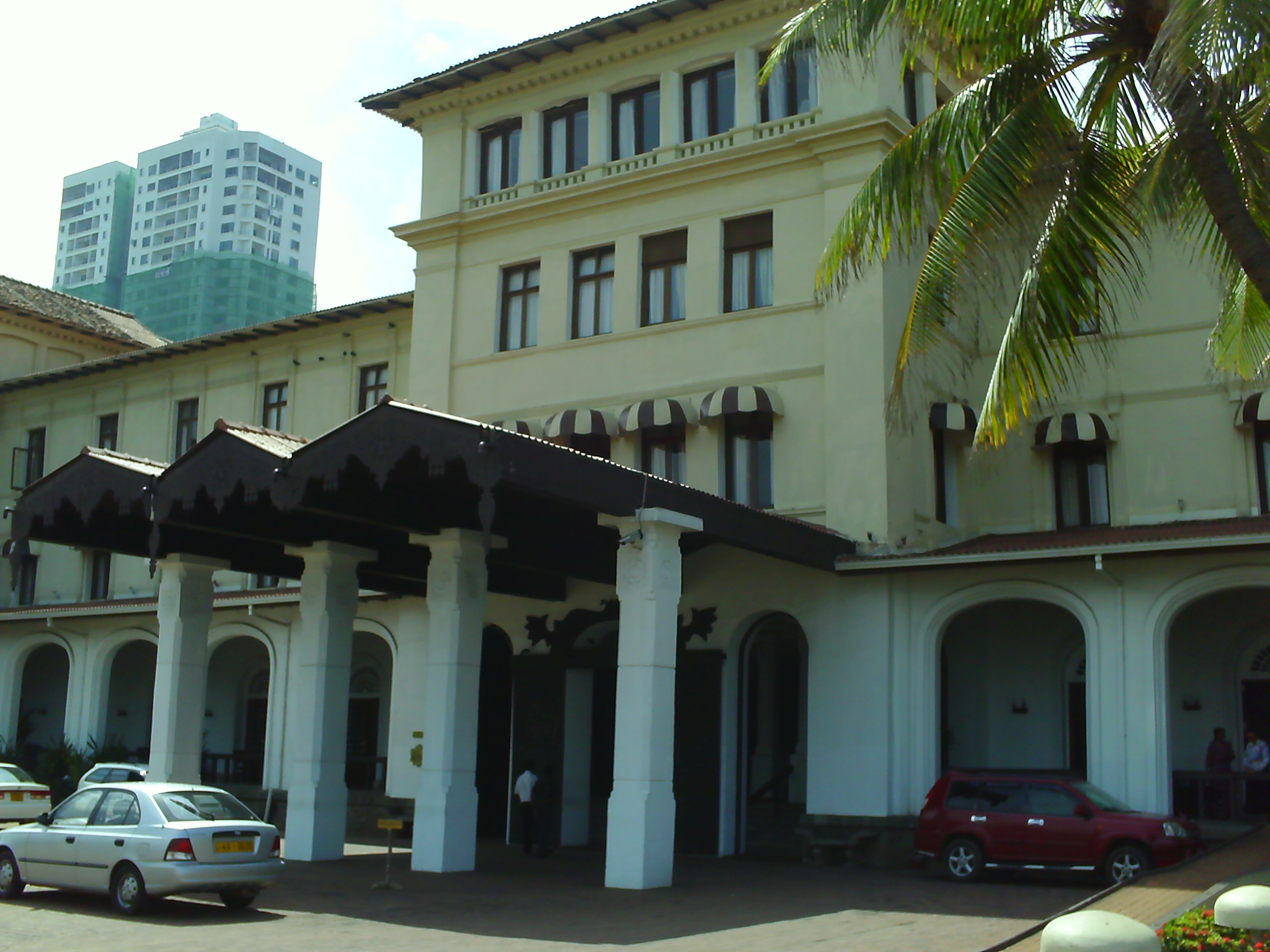
A view of the entrance to the Galle Face Hotel before refurbishment (2008)

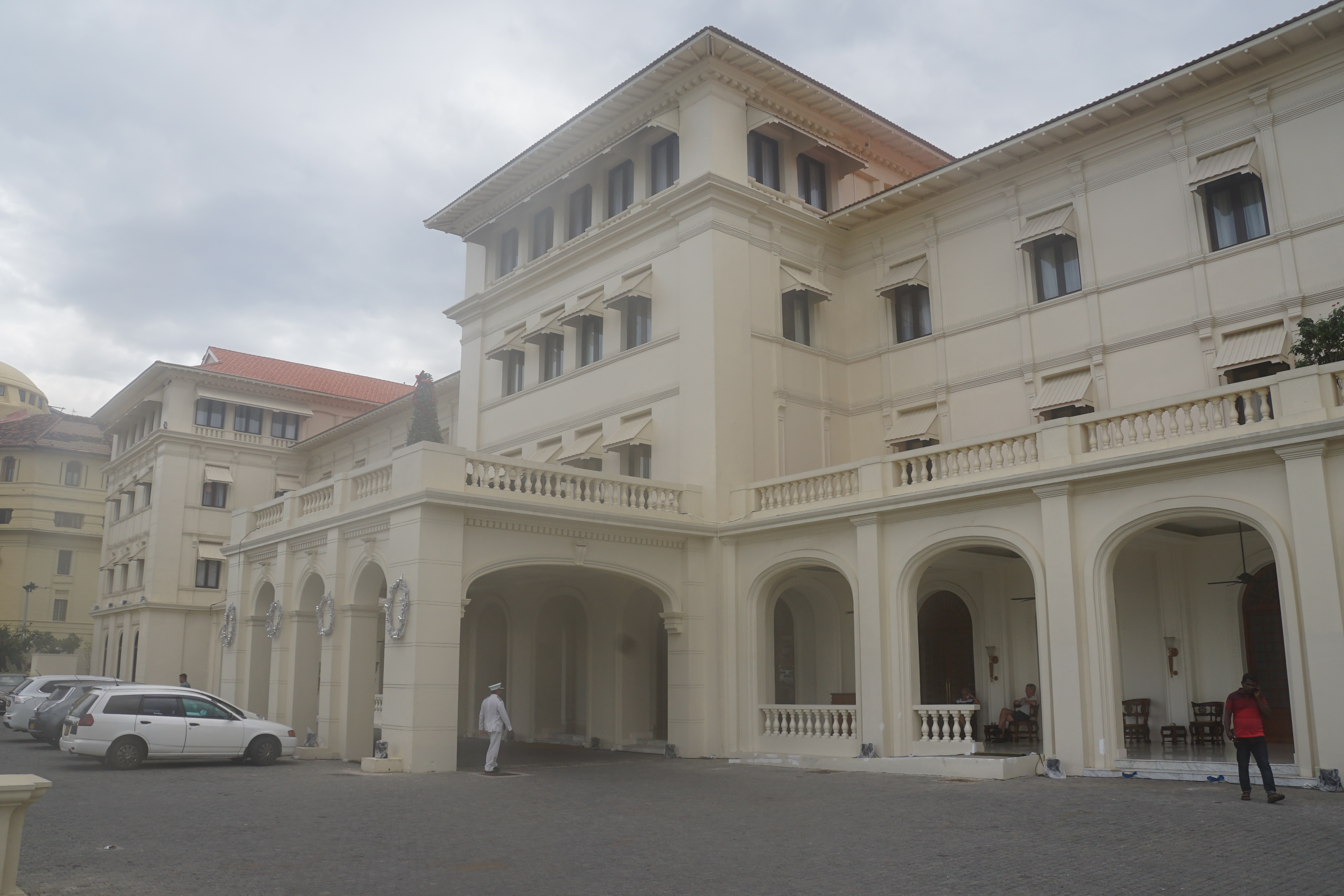
A view of the entrance to the Galle Face Hotel after refurbishment (2015)

The hotel was originally built by four British entrepreneurs in 1864. Its name derives from the stretch of lawn which it faces, known as the Galle Face Green. It began as a Dutch villa called Galle Face House. Land for the hotel's expansion was purchased between 1870 and 1894. In 1894, architect Edward Skinner completed the design of the hotel's current south wing, and the property has remained largely unchanged until the present day, though with many extensive restorations.

Mignonne Fernando and The Jetliners regularly entertained guests at the Coconut Grove, the night club attached to the hotel. The venue was even popularised in a song. Radio Ceylon recorded music programmes from the Coconut Grove as well as the Galle Face Hotel itself, presented by some of the popular Radio Ceylon announcers in the 1950s and 1960s, such as Livy Wijemanne and Vernon Corea. Thousands listened to the broadcasts, particularly 'New Year's Eve' dances from the Galle Face Hotel.

D. G. William (known as 'Galle Face William'), the Lanka Sama Samaja Party trade union leader, first worked and organised workers here. The Science fiction author Arthur C. Clarke wrote the final chapters of 3001: The Final Odyssey in the hotel.

The hotel also employed the world's oldest hospitality industry veteran and doorman, Kottarapattu Chattu ("K.C.") Kuttan. Joining the hotel as a bell boy cum waiter in 1942, he continued to serve until his death on 18 November 2014.

In April 2013, the north wing of the hotel began its refurbishment. In November 2014, It was announced by its new general manager, Antony G. Paton, that it would formally reopen on 1 March 2015. The hotel reopened on 26 October 2015, being formally declared open by the president of Sri Lanka, Maithripala Sirisena.

Celebrity Guests at the hotel have included, inter alia, Princess Alexandra of Denmark, the Duke of Hamilton, Indira Gandhi, Jawaharlal Nehru, Richard Nixon, Prince Philip, Duke of Edinburgh, Admiral Louis Mountbatten, Emperor Hirohito of Japan (while a Prince), Sir Donald Bradman, and Yuri Gagarin. Authors using the premises while writing their books have included, Sir Arthur Conan Doyle, Mark Twain, Anton Chekhov and Sir Arthur C. Clarke.

== Facilities ==
=== Restaurants ===
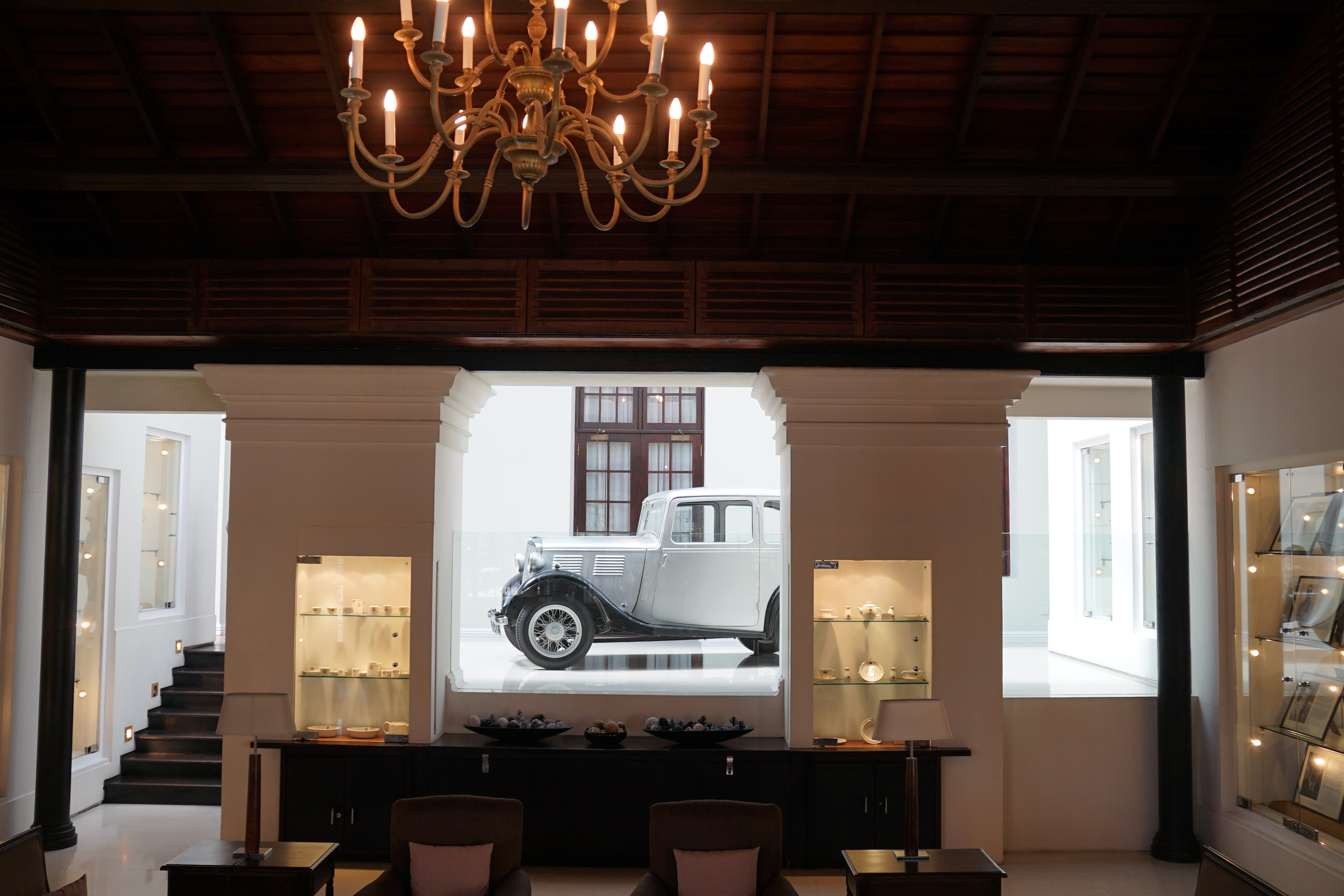
The museum and art gallery at the Galle Face Hotel

The Galle Face Hotel has four restaurants, three bars, and a pub. They are the 1864: Limited Edition fine dining restaurant (lunch & dinner only), King of the Mambo, a Cuban themed restaurant; Firebeach - a lounge bar and restaurant with a wood fired oven; a buffet restaurant known as The Verandah, Travellers' Bar, the Pool Bar, Chequerboard, and an English pub called "In.. On the Green". The open Verandah restaurant is the venue for the Afternoon Tea on the terrace.

=== Museum ===
The hotel features a museum and art gallery in its Regency Wing, which houses the first car that Prince Philip, Duke of Edinburgh owned, and several pieces of memorabilia from the hotel's history, including a gallery of famous guests. There is also an adjacent Library with two study rooms.

=== Pool ===
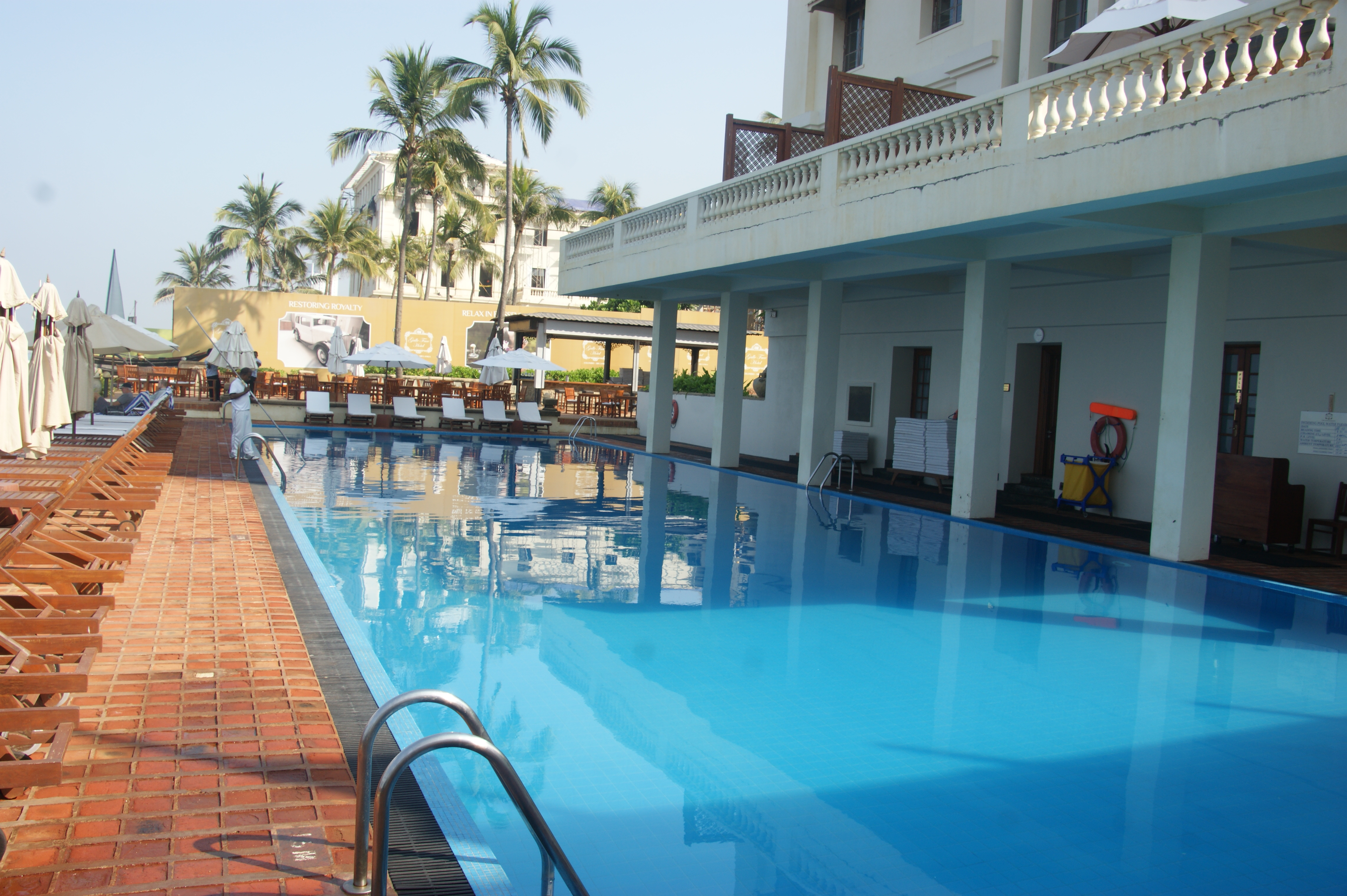
The swimming pool at the Galle Face Hotel

The hotel has a pool with salt water, that is situated very close to the Indian Ocean. It is the only saltwater swimming pool in Colombo.

=== Chequerboard ===
There is a black and white square known as the Chequerboard, close to the King of the Mambo Restaurant. This is often used by guests to watch the sunset.

=== Cannonball run ===
The Cannonball run is an event which was held on the Galle Face Green in Colombo, Sri Lanka, to commemorate a misfiring of a British Artillery cannon in 1840. The cannon misfired during a practice session and the cannonball struck the Galle Face Boarding House, crashing through the roof and landing on a drawing room floor. The cannonball is preserved in the museum at the "South Wing" of the hotel. The commemorative run, held annually, begins at the cannon on the Fort end of the Green and ends at the cannonball placed on a pedestal in the hotel. The runners are generally members of the diplomatic community. The last recorded run was in 2016.

== Literature ==
- Harris, Paul (2007). Delightfully Imperfect: A Year in Sri Lanka at the Galle Face Hotel. Glasgow: Kennedy & Boyd. ISBN 978-1-904999-38-6.
- Warren, William; Gocher, Jill (2007). Asia's legendary hotels: the romance of travel. Singapore: Periplus Editions. ISBN 978-0-7946-0174-4.
