= Sambodhi Chaithya =

Stupa

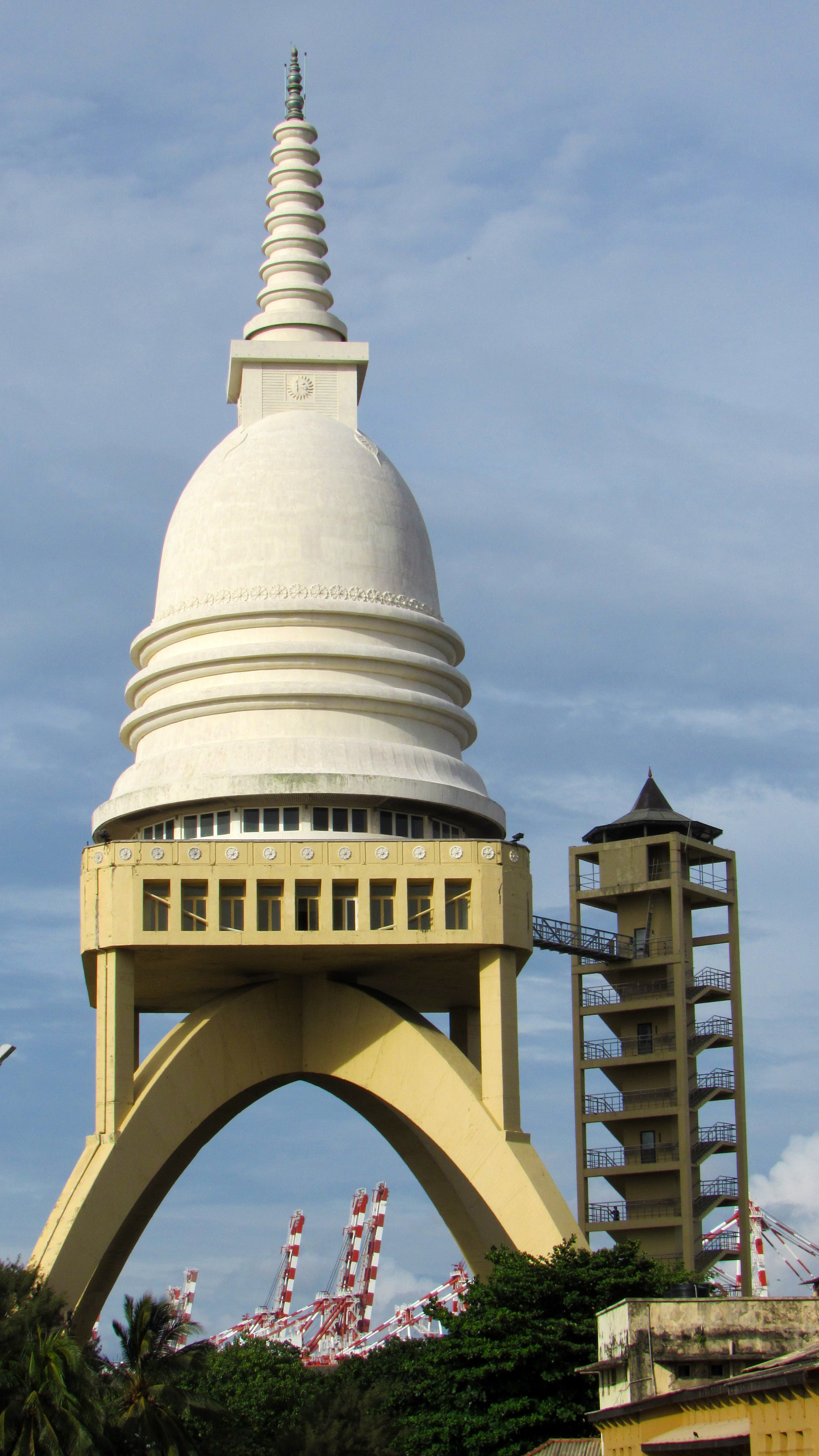

- Location in central Colombo

Religion
- Affiliation: Buddhism

Location
- Location: Fort, Colombo
- Country: Sri Lanka
- Interactive map of Sambodhi Chaithya
- Coordinates: 06°56′18″N 79°50′31″E

Sambodhi Chaithya (also sometimes called Buddha Jayanthi Chaithya) is a stupa, a Buddhist shrine, built with reinforced concrete. The stupa is located in Colombo Harbour, Sri Lanka.

It was designed by renowned Sri Lankan engineer A. N. S. Kulasinghe and construction began in 1956 to commemorate the Sambuddhatva jayanthi by the Colombo Port Commission and completed by the Colombo Port Authority. Built on a platform supported by two interlocking arches, the stupa is place above the Marine Drive at the entrance of the Colombo Harbour. This main road leading to the harbour has since been renamed Chaithya Road after the stupa. The walkway has 123 steps.

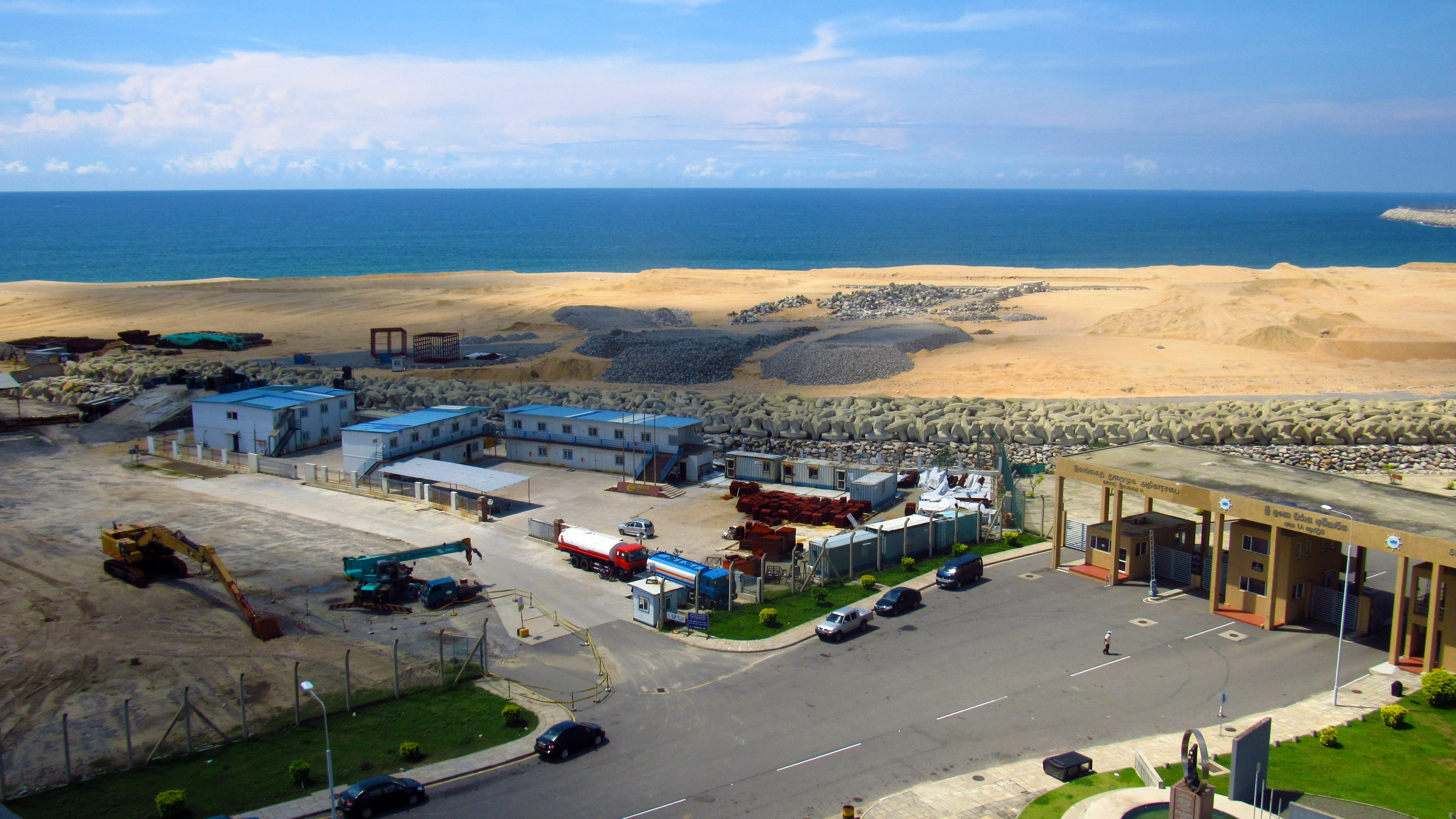
View of the construction site of Colombo Port City, from the temple.

== See also ==
- Colombo Port City
