= Kalutara (disambiguation) =

Kalutara may refer to:

- Kalutara, a town in south western Sri Lanka in Kalutara District, Western Province
- Kalutara District, an administrative district of Sri Lanka
- Kalutara Electoral District, a multi-member electoral district of Sri Lanka
- Kalutara Electoral District (1947–1989), a former single-member electoral district of Sri Lanka
- Kalutara prison riots, a riot at the high-security prison in Kalutara town
- Kalutara Stadium, a multi-use stadium in Kalutara town
- Kalutara Town Club, a first-class cricket club based in Kalutara town
- Kalutara Vidyalaya National School, Kalutara, a school in Kalutara town
- Kalutara Vihara, a dagoba (buddhist shrine) located south of the Kalutara Bridge
