= P. Andrew Cooray =

Member of the Parliament of Ceylon (1901–1998)

Hon. P. Andrew Cooray

Kalutara
- In office 1952–1960
- Preceded by: Cholomondeley Goonewardene
- Succeeded by: Cholomondeley Goonewardene

Personal details
- Born: Pesteruweliyanarallage Andrew Cooray; 5 August 1901 Kalutara, Sri Lanka
- Died: 2 June 1998 (aged 96)
- Party: United National Party
- Spouse: Mary Laura née Mathes
- Children: Ranjan, Marie Dabrera, Nixita, Rohan
- Occupation: lawyer, politician, businessman
- Ethnicity: Sinhalese

Pesteruweliyanarallage Andrew Cooray (5 August 1901 – 2 June 1998) was a member of the Parliament of Ceylon.

== Biography ==
Pesteruweliyanarallage Andrew Cooray was born 5 August 1901, the eldest in a family of eleven. He was a founding member of the United National Party (UNP) entering politics in 1928, two years after he passed out as a proctor. In 1927 Cooray became a village committee member for Maggona and Payagala. He then contested and was elected onto the Kalutara Urban Council, a position he retained for thirty years. In 1938 he was appointed chairman of the Urban Council, a position he retained for fourteen years.

In 1952 he contested the second parliamentary elections for the UNP in the Kalutara electorate successfully defeating the sitting member, Cholomondeley Goonewardene, from the Lanka Sama Samaja Party, by 332 votes (a margin of just under 1% of the total vote).

In 1965 he sought re-election at the 3rd parliamentary elections but finished third, losing to Goonewardene by 4,108 votes.

In 1934 Cooray started distilling arrack and vinegar at his Anwil Distillery. He was also the owner of the Neboda Omnibus Company and the chairman of Free Lanka Finance Ltd. He also, as a board member of Global Films, produced several films including Kalu Diya Dahara, which debuted Ravindra Randeniya, and The God King, which was directed by Lester James Peiris.

Cooray died on 2 June 1998, at the age of 96, the oldest surviving member of the United National Party.
