= Kalutara Bodhiya =

Sacred tree in Kalutara, Sri Lanka

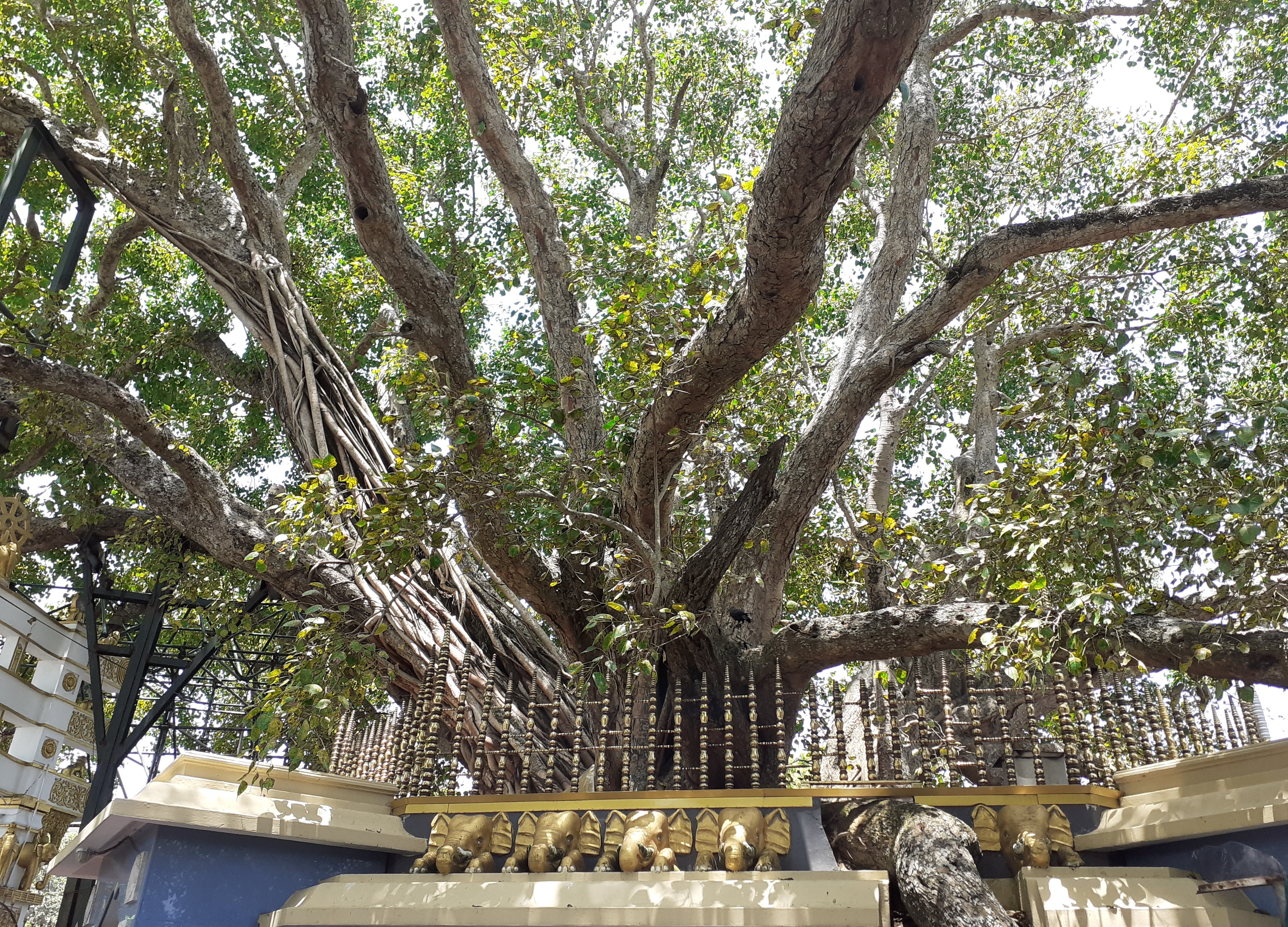
- Kalautara Bodhiya
- Interactive map of Kalutara Bodhiya
- Species: Bodhi (Ficus religiosa)
- Location: Kalutara, Sri Lanka
- Coordinates: 6°35′13″N 79°57′37″E
- Date seeded: According to chronicles the first sapling was planted around in 2nd century BC
- Custodian: Kalutara Bodhi Trust

Kalutara Bodhiya is a Bodhi tree (sacred fig) located in Kalutara, Western Province of Sri Lanka. Situated on the Galle Colombo main road, by the side of Kalu River just south to the Kalutara city, it is believed to be one of the 32 saplings of the Jaya Sri Maha Bodhi in Anuradhapura, Sri Lanka. A Buddhist temple Kalutara Viharaya and a modern Stupa, Kalutara Chaitya are located in close proximity to this sacred fig. One of the most venerated religious place in Sri Lanka, hundreds of Buddhists and foreign tourists visit this religious place daily.

== History ==
Kalutara Bodhiya is an old Bodhi tree which is identified as one of the 32 saplings of Jaya Sri Maha Bodhi which was planted during the reign of king Devanampiyatissa in the 2nd century BC at Anuradhapura, Sri Lanka. According to ancient chronicle Sinhala Bodhiwamsa, 32 saplings of sacred figs, which were sprouted from Jaya Sri Maha Bodhi, were planted in various parts of the country as instructed by Arahant Mahinda Thera. Further the chronicle states that this Bodhi tree existed intact till the 15th century AD.

However it is said that the Buddhist public started to consider this place as a sacred place after a Pandyan prince named Wickrema Pandya planted a Bodhi tree at the Pahala Maluwa of the Kaluthara Bodhi premises in 1042 AD. Prince Wickrema Pandya served as a viceroy in Kalutara area during that period. After the Portuguese took over the control of Maritime Provinces of Sri Lanka in 16th century, the site of the Kalutara Bodhiya was converted into a fort probably due to strategic importance of its location.

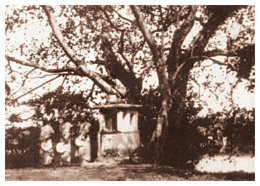
Kalutara Bodhiya as appeared in the early 20th century.

After the Portuguese, the Dutch and the English, who succeeded them as colonial rulers of Sri Lanka, also used Kalutara Bodhi premises for administrative and military purposes. During the 19th century when the British government started to construct railroads in Sri Lanka, it was decided to remove this Bodhi tree as it was obstructing the initial plans to build the Kalutara Railway bridge. But it was later decided to construct the bridge without harming the Bodhi tree, due to the protests made by the Buddhist public, who were led by Sandanayake Upasaka, a Buddhist layman in Kalutara area.

The modern development of Kalutara Bodhiya as a religious place initiated when the Kalutara Buddhist Society was formed in 1931. The main objectives of this society were the welfare of the Buddhists and the development of Buddhism in Kalutara area. After Ceylon gained independence from Britain in 1948, the newly appointed government led by Prime Minister Rt. Hon. D. S. Senanayake, on the request made by Sir. Cyrill de Soysa, took measures to remove other establishments from the area to keep the Kalutara Bodhiya site only for religious purposes.

== Kalutara Bodhi Trust ==
The Kalutara Bodhi Trust (KBT) was established by Sir Cyril de Zoysa, a prominent lawyer, senator and notary public, with the help of six other lawyers in November 7, 1951. The prime objective of the Kalutara Bodhi Trust is the “Protection and Nurturing of Historic Kalutara Bodhiya”. Sir Ernest de Silva was the first chairman of the KBT. Although Kalutara Bodhi Trust was initially confined to Kalutara region in its scope of work, today it has expanded its operation by going beyond from its initial objective for the sake of Buddha Sasana in Sri Lanka.

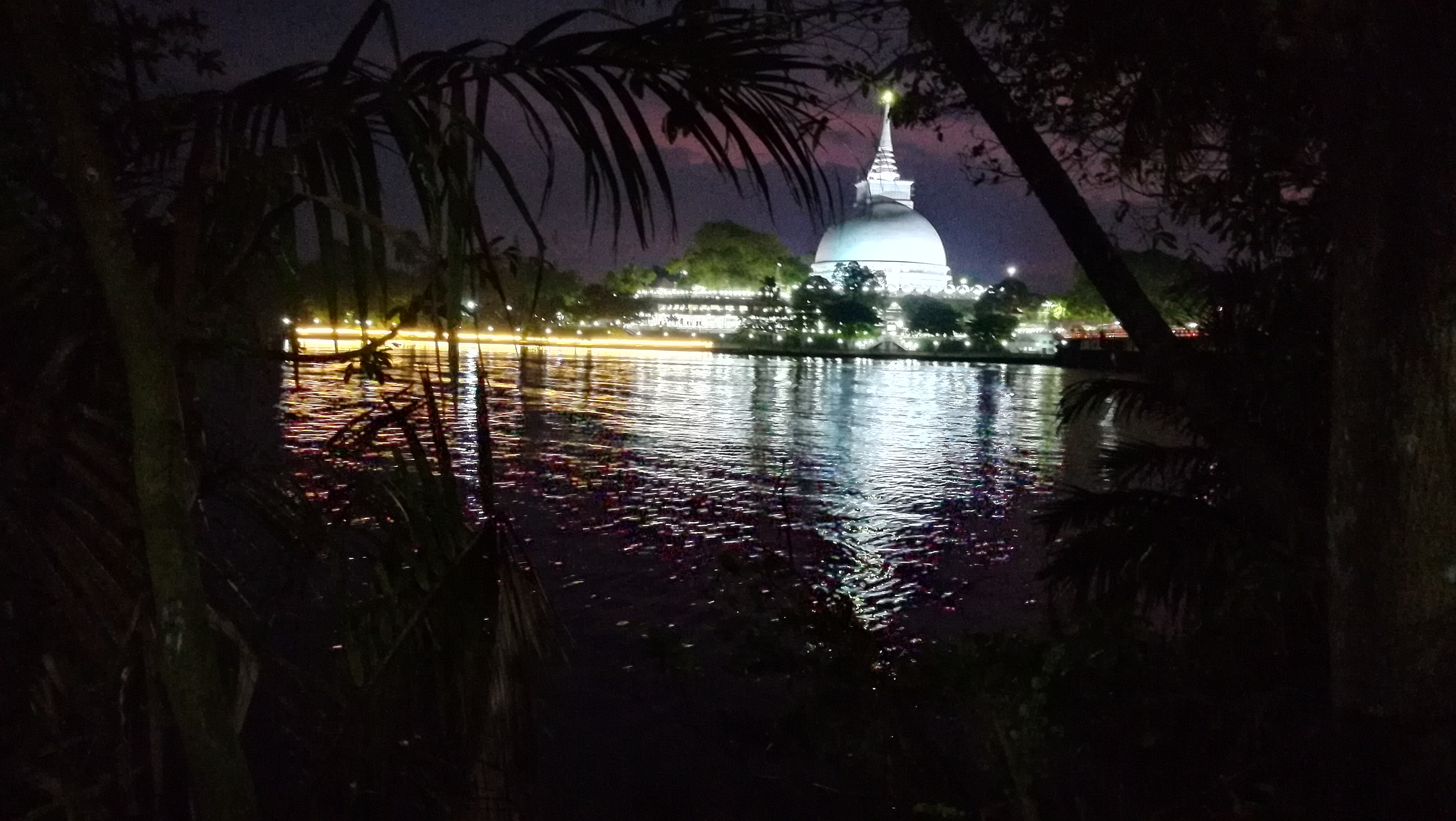
A night view of Kalutara Bodhiya and Chaitya across the river

Presently Kalutara Bodhi Trust serves as a non-profit organization which empowers the education and health sectors as well as the civil society in Sri Lanka. In addition to the protection and development of Kalutara Bodhiya, its other main objective is to alleviate poverty and giving humanitarian assistance to the needy sectors of the Sri Lankan population to achieve sustainable development and welfare of the society. In addition to that KBT is also involved in conducting Blood Donation Programmes and programmes to save cattle from death on every other poya days.

== See also ==
- Kalutara Chaitya
- Kataragama Bodhiya
- Matara Bodhiya
