= Kalutara Fort =

Kalutara fort
- Kalutara, Sri Lanka
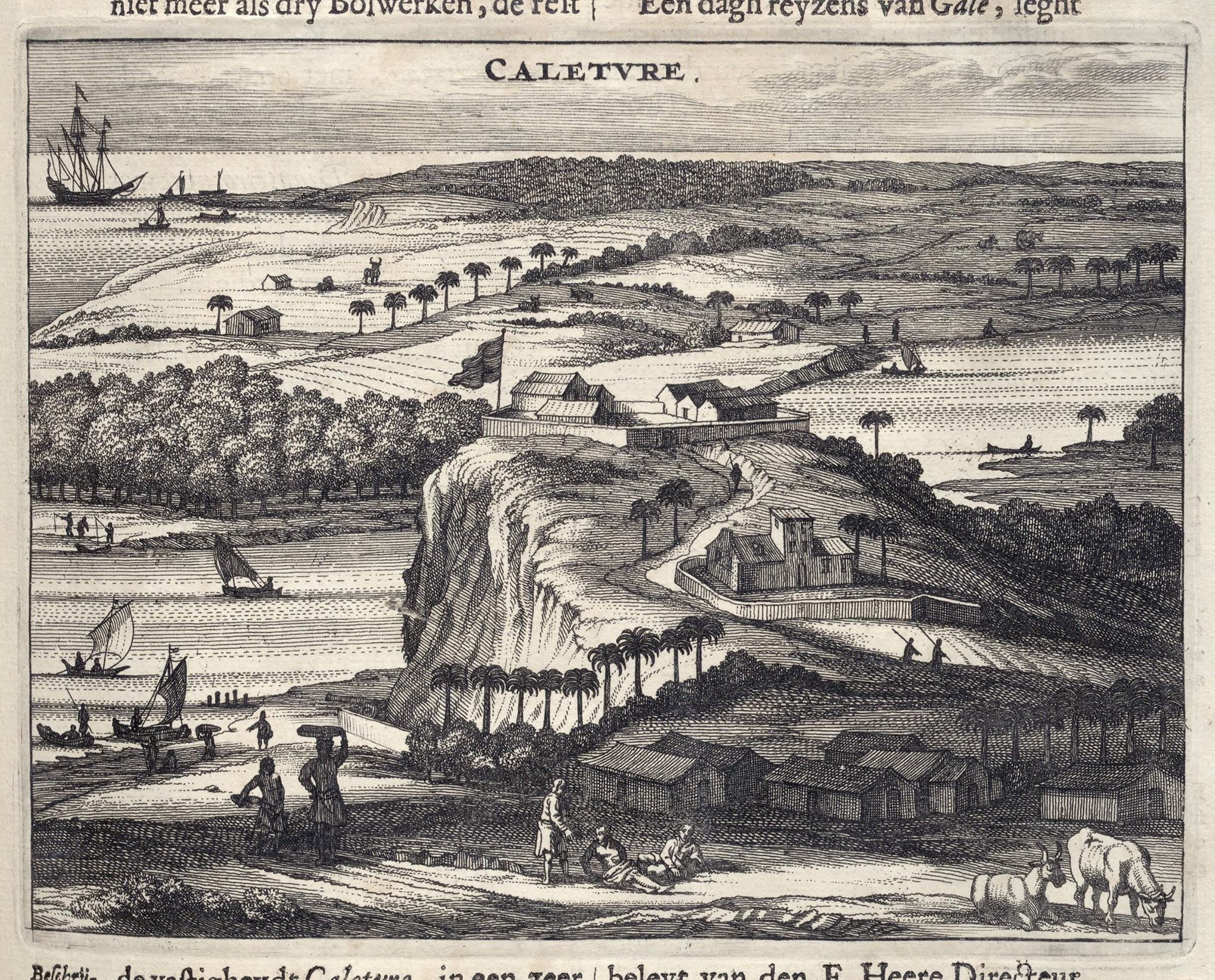
- 1672 Dutch engraving of Fort Caletvre

Site information
- Type: Defence fort
- Condition: Destroyed

Location
- Sri Lanka
- Location within Sri Lanka
- Coordinates: 6.587070°N 79.960175°E

Site history
- Built: 1622
- Built by: Portuguese and Dutch

Kalutara fort (Sinhala: කලුතර බලකොටුව Kaluthara Balakotuwa; Tamil: களுத்துறைக் கோட்டை, romanized: Kaḷuttuṟaik Kōṭṭai) was built by the Portuguese in 1622. It was located in Kalutara, Sri Lanka.

In 1574, Portuguese forces, commanded by Diogo de Melo de Castro, devastated the area south of Colombo destroying numerous shrines and temple. In late 1594 Portuguese forces, led by Jerónimo de Azevedo, captured the town of Kalutara. In 1622 the Portuguese and built a fort on the site of the destroyed Gangathilaka temple. The fort was constructed under the supervision of Jorge de Albuquerque. It was subsequently captured by King Rajasinghe I of the Sitawaka kingdom. Then still later it was captured by the Dutch and re-captured by the Portuguese.

On 15 October 1655 following a siege by Dutch forces, led by Gerard Hulft, the Portuguese commander of the fort, Anthonio Mendes de Aranha, surrendered the fort and garrison of 255 men, without a shot being fired. In 1677 the Dutch fortified it by constructing two additional bastions, increasing the size of the ramparts, digging a moat and erecting a drawbridge. It is reported that the Dutch Governor brought over architects from Netherlands especially to rebuild this fort. Most of the building material was sourced locally however it is reported that certain types of rocks were brought from the Netherlands. In February 1769, it was surrendered to the British, and was used for garrison and residence of the Government Agent. The building was also used as a country retreat by the Colonial Secretary of Ceylon, John Rodney, who buried an infant son there.

There is no remains of the fort due to the construction of Kalutara Vihara on the site.

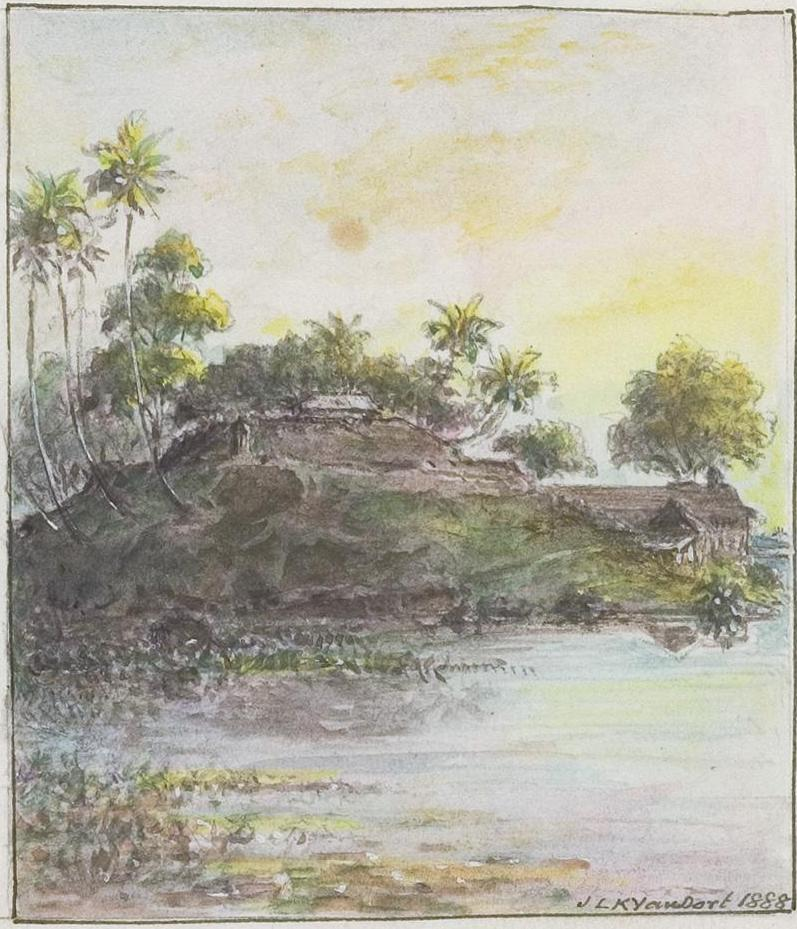
Kalutara Fort
