= Asokaramaya Buddhist Temple =

Buddhist temple in Kalutara, Sri Lanka

Asokaramaya Buddhist Temple is a Buddhist temple in Kalutara, Sri Lanka. It was built during the 1870s to shelter disciples of Aluthgama Sangharatne who came to hear the monk's sermons. A wealthy local resident named Elliyas Fernando funded the temple's construction and subsequent expansion.

== History ==
In 1873, Buddhist monk Aluthgama Sangharatne came to the village of Etanamadala in northern Kalutara District. He took up residence in a hermitage located in the jungle near the Kalu Ganga River. Aluthgama Sangharatne sought alms from villagers, and they gathered at the hermitage to hear his sermons. Local resident Elliyas Fernando, a wealthy resident of northern Kalutara, was impressed by Aluthgama Sangharatne's sermons and become the monk's primary benefactor.

=== Construction ===
Elliyas Fernando organized funding for a small hall, Katti-paha, to be built on the land now occupied by the temple to enable the monk to conduct his sermons inside the hall. The popularity of the monk's sermons attracted Buddhist devotees in large numbers. With increased donations from a growing number of devotees, renovations to increase the capacity of the hall were undertaken and the hall was renamed "Dharma Salava" (a name which is still used).

Before the establishment of Dharma Salava, residents of Etanamadala built a small shrine for temple-goers to make offerings. Additionally, an interim preaching hall was built whilst Katti-paha was being renovated. This hall was funded by donations from Elliyas Fernando, to enable new monks to reside within the complex. In the center of this large building is a relic chamber, surrounded by smaller halls and a drawing room.

=== Expansions ===
Elliyas Fernando also funded the establishment of a "mansion for Buddha". This building has since been converted into a shrine house (the Vihara Mandira, "a place of many splendors"). The stone inscription on the front wall of the shrine states, "This Temple Asokarama is offered to the Monks by the devotee Elliyas Fernando in the year 2411 Buddhist era, that is 1867AD. In the midst of the Maha Sangha, the retinue of monks was headed by Ven. Siri Dhammarama Thera of Matara".

After Aluthgama Sangharatne's death, Sumanatissa Thera—a monk of the Siri Dhamma Yuttika (Matara) sect of Buddhism—headed the temple from 1881 to 1920. During this period the dageba (stupas) were built. These stupas, which contain relics of historical and religious significance to the Asokaramaya temple complex, have been preserved into the 21st century.

Following Sumanatissa Thera's death, Vimalajoti Tissa was head of the temple from 1934 to 1959. Under his leadership many additions to the temple were completed, including the preaching hall, the Bo-Tree and the bell tower (which is still in use). Thera's pupils included Parakaduwe Saranankara and Kirillavela Piyatissa, students at Molligoda Pirivena. After Saddhatissa's death, administration of the temple was handed over to Delgoda Pemananda.

== Current leadership ==
Since 1976 the temple leader has been Parakaduwe Saranankara, who is also chief monk of the Buddhist Monetary Council of Kalutara; chief monk of the New Korale and Thotamune Buddhist Monetary Council in Colombo and six other temples in Sri Lanka:

- Vivekarama Buddhist Temple, Kaduboda Delgoda
- Vivekarama Buddhist Temple, Mahara
- Vivekarama Buddhist Temple, Kalutara Beach, Kalutara North
- Bodhirukkarama Vivekarama Buddhist Temple, Kalutara North
- Dharmakeerthiyodyarama Vivekarama Buddhist Temple, Kalutara South
- Ashokarama Maha Viharaya, Kalutara North, Kalutara

Parakaduwe Saranankara is also head of the Buddhist Monetary Council of Kalutara and the districts of Colombo.
