= Upali Batuwantudawe =

Ceylonese lawyer and politician

Upali Batuwantudawe was a Ceylonese lawyer and politician.

== Career ==
=== As a lawyer ===
Batuwantudawe was called to the bar in 1932 at the Middle Temple, as such on 4 August 1932 he was admitted and enrolled as an Advocate of the Supreme Court of Ceylon. On 19 June 1936 Batuwantudawe, together with his brother, were convicted of cheating, forgery and impersonation for which he served six months imprisonment. He was subsequently struck off the roll of advocates on 8 October 1937.

=== As a politician ===
Following the death of the sitting member for Kalutara, Charles Batuwantudawe, on 13 September 1940, Batuwantudawe contested and won the by-election for the seat on 21 December 1940 and was duly elected to the 2nd State Council of Ceylon. He was a member of the executive committee on Local Administration until the State Council was abolished in July 1947.

At the 1st parliamentary election, held between 23 August 1947 and 20 September 1947, Batuwantudawe contested the Kalutara electorate, representing the United National Party. He was defeated by the Lanka Sama Samaja Party candidate, Cholomondeley Goonewardene, by 1,970 votes. He ran again, unsuccessfully at the 2nd parliamentary election in May 1952 and the 3rd parliamentary election held in April 1956, as an independent and as the Sri Lanka Freedom Party candidate respectively.

== Marriage ==
Batuwantudawe married Lily Charlotte née Ratnayake, the daughter of Muhandiram A. A. W. Ratnayake.
