= Batuwantudawe =

Batuwantudawe is a surname. Notable people with the name include:

- Charles Batuwantudawe (1877–1940), Sri Lankan politician
- Upali Batuwantudawe (fl. 1932–1956), Ceylonese lawyer and politician
