= Kit Premier League Division I =

- Country: Sri Lanka
- Number of clubs: 12-15
- Level on pyramid: 3
- Promotion to: S1 League
- Relegation to: S3 League

Division I is the third level division of the Football Federation of Sri Lanka. 12 or 15 teams represent this division divided into two groups. The top team of each group of this division is promoted to Kit Premier League while last team of both groups is relegated to Sri Lanka Football Division II.

== League structure ==
Structure of this league has changed on yearly basis most of time since this tournament is sponsored by various sponsors on a yearly basis. Dialog Telekom (2008/2009, 2007/2008, 2006/2007), CEAT tires (2009/2010), Unique apparels (2010/2011) are some of the past sponsors of the tournament. Number of participating teams were 12 in 2008/2009 and 2009/2010.

After the group stages the top 2 teams from each group play in a semifinals stage. The winners of the semifinals then played in a finals to determine the champion of division I. The top two teams (the finalists) are promoted to the premier division while the bottom teams of each group are relegated to the lower division.

== History ==
Year	Champions	Runner-up
2006/2007	New Young SC - Wennapuwa	Jupiters SC - Negombo
2007/2008	Navy SC	Javalane SC - Slave Island (Colombo)
2008/2009	Colombo SC - Kotahena (Colombo)	Don Bosco SC - Negambo
2009/2010	Java Lane SC - Slave Island (Colombo)	Kalutara Park SC - Kalutara
2010/2011	SL Navy SC - []	Nandamitra SC - []
2011/2012	Kalutara Park SC - Kalutara	Negambo Youth SC - Negambo
2012/2013	Java Lane SC - Slave Island (Colombo)	Nandamitra SC - []
2013/2014	Colombo	
