= Chandika Seeman =

Sri Lankan cricketer (born 1977)

Pradeep Chandika Seeman (born November 10, 1977) was a Sri Lankan cricketer. He was a right-handed batsman who played for Kalutara Town Club. He was born in Kalutara.

Seeman played six matches in the Saravanamuttu Trophy competition of 1996–97, in Kalutara Town Club's only season in first-class cricket. Despite scoring a duck in the first innings of his debut first-class match, he recovered in the second innings to score 37. His best score of the competition followed in the next match, an innings of 45 in a draw against Burgher Recreational Club.

Seeman retained a position in the upper order in the first half of the competition, after which he switched to playing in the middle of the order.
