= Cholomondeley Goonewardene =

Sri Lankan politician

The Honourable Cholomondeley de Fonseka Goonewardene

Member of Parliament

Minister of Public Works
- In office 1964–1965

Personal details
- Born: 16 September 1917 Kalutara, Ceylon
- Died: 25 November 2006 (aged 89) Kalutara, Sri Lanka
- Party: Lanka Sama Samaja Party
- Spouse: Udawattage Cecilin de Silva
- Education: S. Thomas' College, Mount Lavinia; London School of Economics
- Occupation: Lawyer
- Ethnicity: Sinhalese

Cholomondeley de Fonseka Goonewardene (චොල්මොණ්ඩලේ ද නොව චමලි ද නොව චම්ලි) (16 September 1917 – 25 November 2006) was a prominent Sri Lankan politician, Member of Parliament, and cabinet minister.

Born in Kalutara to a local Muhandiram family, Goonewardene was educated at Holy Cross College, Kalutara and S. Thomas' College, Mount Lavinia. He later qualified as an advocate and started his legal practice in Unofficial Bar in Kalutara in 1946. He was one of the early members of the Marxist Lanka Sama Samaja Party – the first political party in Sri Lanka- and founded its Kalutara Branch in 1937 and in 1940 he was elected to the Kalutara Urban Council. Giving up his legal practice, Goonewardene took up full time political work. Representing the Lanka Sama Samaja Party he was the member of parliament on several occasions for the Kalutara electorate from 1947 to 1977 and between such terms he served as Chairman of the Kalutara Urban Council from 1954 to 1956 and again in the 1960s. In June 1964 he was appointed Minister of Works in the First Sirimavo Bandaranaike cabinet. He was the last surviving member to have served on the first Parliament of Ceylon. He was a cousin of Leslie Goonewardene and an older brother of former senior member of the Ceylon Civil Service (CCS) and Prime Minister’s Secretary Eardley (E.G.) Goonewardene.
