= Holy Cross College, Kalutara =

Holy Cross College

Location
- Kalutara; Sri Lanka; 6.5766°N 79.9637°E

Information
- Type: Semi Government
- Motto: In Hoc Signo Vinces - in this [sign] you will conquer -
- Religious affiliation: Roman Catholic
- Established: 1900; 126 years ago
- Founder: Brohier (Burgher National)
- Sister school: Holy Family Convent, Kalutara
- Rector: Prasad Niranjan
- Staff: 100
- Grades: 1 – 13
- Gender: Boys
- Enrollment: 1800
- Houses: Robert, Heral, Croos, Britain
- Colors: Purple & Gold
- Alumni name: Crusaders

Holy Cross College (Sinhala: සිරිකුරුස විදුහල) is a Roman Catholic boys' school in Kalutara, Sri Lanka. Founded in the late 19th century, the college provides primary and secondary education.

== History ==
Holy Cross College, Kalutara, began in 1880 when Mr Brohier started a Private school managed by Rev. Fr. Wilkinson OMI (Priest of Parish of Kalamulla, Kalutara) near Holy Cross Church. In 1890, it became a grant-in-aid school for boys and girls.

In 1902, Rev. Fr. Leo Fernando (Priest of Parish of Kalamulla, Kalutara) officially founded the college on its current site to provide English education. By 1904, enrollment reached 75 students. Under Rev. Fr. Martin Herel (1905–1912), the college gained permission to enter students for Cambridge Examinations, promoted cricket—producing famous cricketer M.K. Albert—and built the Lady of Lourdes grotto. Between 1912 and 1930, the school introduced a library, science labs, cadetting, and was elevated to Senior Secondary School status. The college hall was inaugurated in 1927.

Rev. Fr. Gaston Chaulieu's tenure (1930–1946) marked a golden era, characterised by physical expansion, the introduction of London Matriculation exams, and the establishment of a house system named after past principals. In 1935, the girls' school separated as Holy Family Convent. Post-independence, under Rev. Fr. Arthur Nicholas Fernando (1946–1948), the college acquired its own playground and was upgraded to an "A" Grade institution. The first Prime Minister, D. S. Senanayake, was the chief guest at the 1948 prize-giving. The Golden Jubilee was celebrated during Rev. Fr. Benedict Pinto's leadership, with Governor General Lord Soulbury attending.

In the 1960s, government takeover of denominational schools forced Holy Cross to become a private non-fee levying school, sustained by community and Archdiocese support. Cadetting was discontinued due to the loss of facilities. The Marist Brothers took over management in 1978, led by Rev. Bro. Francis Silva, who initiated the construction of new buildings and secured government salary payments. Successors expanded the infrastructure further, adding a brass band and new classrooms.

As of 2025, the college serves about 1,800 students with 100 teachers.

== Houses ==
- Robert
- Heral
- Croos
- Breton

== Sports ==
=== Cricket ===
The Battle of the Lagoons (1979 – 1995) between Holy Cross College, Kalutara, and Maris Stella College, Negombo, began in 1979 and featured seven consecutive official matches before the series paused. In total, ten matches were played.

Holy Cross College and neighbouring Kalutara Vidyalaya have a long-standing cricket rivalry, reflecting the strong cricketing tradition of both schools in Kalutara.

In 2025, Holy Cross College, Kalutara, and St. Aloysius' College, Galle, held their first cricket encounter, known as the Battle of Dreams, at the Galle International Stadium, establishing a new annual sporting fixture between the two schools.

== Notable alumni ==
- Bradman Weerakoon – Sri Lankan civil servant (1930 – 2025)
- V. L. Wijemanne – Sri Lankan lawyer and politician (1909 – 1990)
- Jayantha Silva – former Sri Lankan cricketer
- Ranga Wimalawansa – former Sri Lankan sprinter
- Weerasinghe Sujan Perera – Sri Lankan footballer
- Praveen Jayawickrama – Sri Lankan cricketer
