= Richmond Castle, Kalutara =

Building in Kalutara, Sri Lanka

Richmond Castle
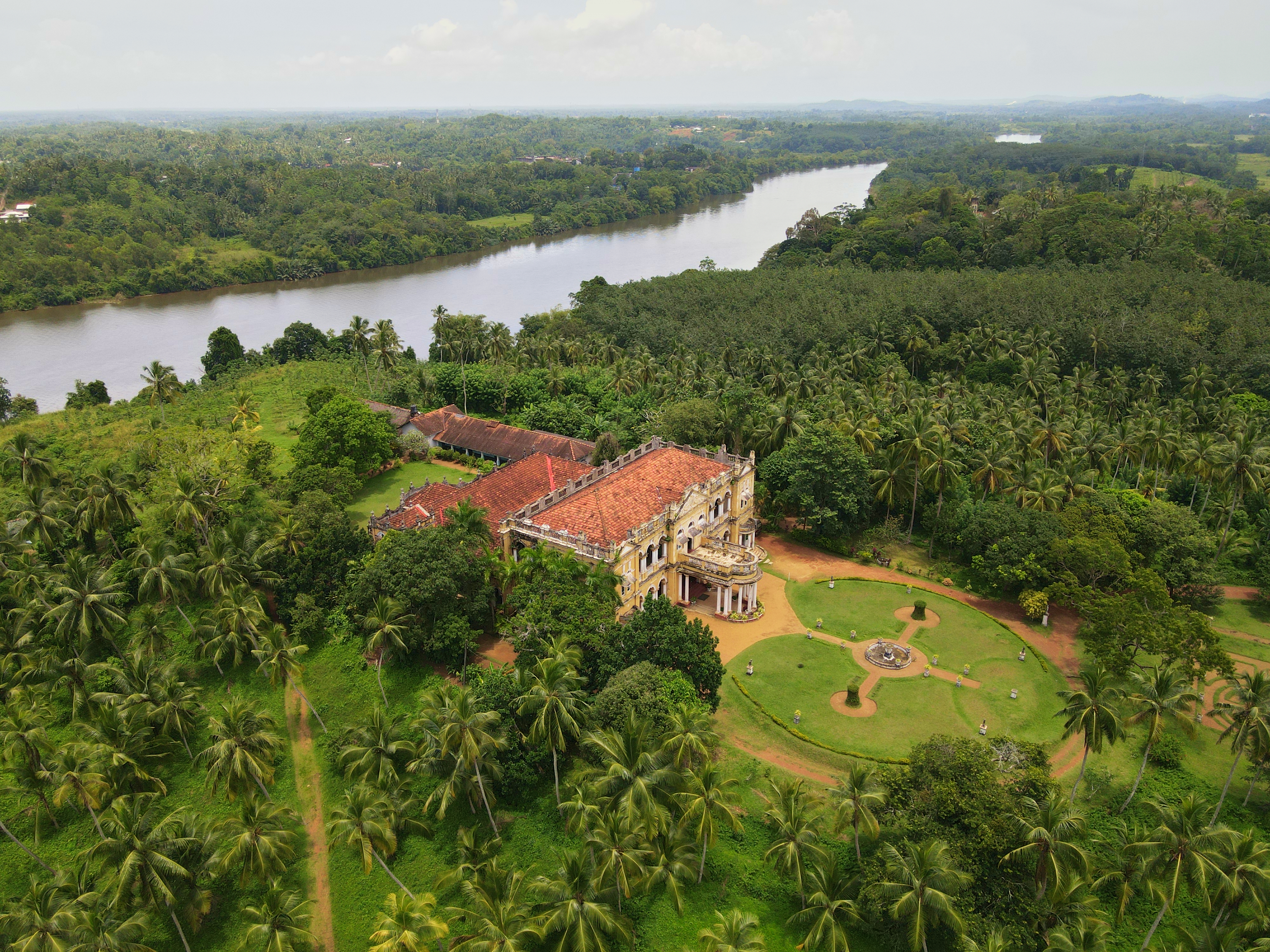
- Interactive map of the Richmond Castle area
- Alternative names: Richmond Mandiraya

General information
- Location: Kalutara, Sri Lanka
- Coordinates: 6.6015°N 79.9753°E
- Completed: 1910
- Owner: Public Trustee of Sri Lanka

Richmond Castle is an Edwardian mansion, located near Kalutara. Built between 1900 and 1910, it was formally the country seat of Mudaliyar Don Arthur de Silva Wijesinghe Siriwardena. The building is currently owned by the Public Trustee and open to the public.

The house sits on a hill 2 km (1.2 mi) from the Kalutara, adjoining the Kalu Ganga River at Palatota, on a 42 acres (17 ha) estate beside the Kalutara-Palatota Road.

== History ==
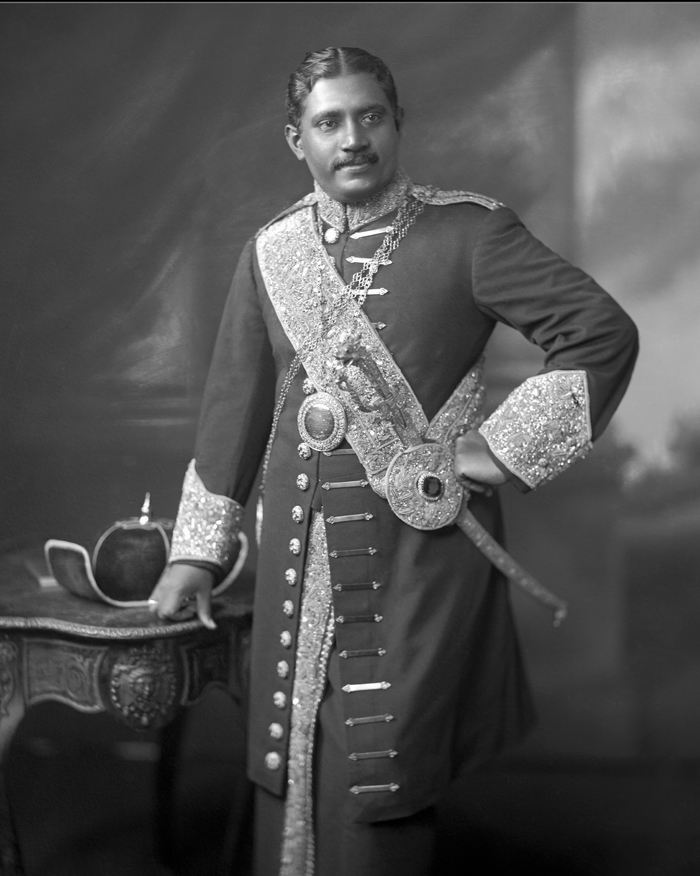
Mudaliyar Don Arthur de Silva Wijesinghe Siriwardena photographed 22 December 1919

The building was constructed by a local landowner and philanthropist, Padikara Mudali Nanayakkara Rajawasala Appuhamilage Don Arthur de Silva Wijesinghe Siriwardena (12 November 1889 – 8 July 1947). Srirwardena studied in Britain and on completion of his studies he was bestowed the position of Mudaliyar by the king, returning to Ceylon to take up the position.

The mansion was built based on a similar plan of a castle in India, which was owned by Srirwardena's schoolmates, Raja Rajeswara Sethupathi, the Raja of Ramnad. Sriwardena had requested a copy of the building plans from the Sethupathi, but was refused with the advice the Ceylonese were not capable of undertaking such a large construction project. This inspired Sriwardena to visit the Raja with two local architects, who secretly drew plans of the castle.

Richmond Castle is a two-storey building with sixteen rooms, 99 doors and 34 windows. All essential supplies for the building were sourced from abroad, including floor tiles from Italy, teak from Burma (used to construct the main staircase), window panes, decorated with glass depicting grapevines, from Scotland, and an iron stair and bathroom fittings from England. Srirwardena moved into Richmond Castle upon his marriage to Clarice Matilda Maude Suriyabandara in 1910. The marriage took place in St. Mary's Church Kalamulla.

The couple spent 32 years together however they were unable to have children. Srirwenda bequeathed his properties to the Public Trustee, with the request that the castle was converted to a children's home. Srirwardena died on 8 July 1947 and from 1956 the Richmond Castle has been taken care by the Public Trustee Department of Sri Lanka.

== See also ==
- Srawasthi Mandiraya
