= Kalutara Electoral District (1947–1989) =

Electoral district of Sri Lanka

Kalutara electoral district was an electoral district of Sri Lanka between August 1947 and February 1989. The district was named after the town of Kalutara in Kalutara District, Western Province. The 1978 Constitution of Sri Lanka introduced the proportional representation electoral system for electing members of Parliament. The existing 160 mainly single-member electoral districts were replaced with 22 multi-member electoral districts. Kalutara electoral district was replaced by the Kalutara multi-member electoral district at the 1989 general elections, the first under the PR system, though Kalutara continues to be a polling division of the multi-member electoral district.

== Members of Parliament ==
Key

Independent LSSP UNP

Election	Member	Party	Term
1947	Cholomondeley Goonewardene	LSSP	1947-1952
1952	P. Andrew Cooray	UNP	1952-1956
1956	Cholomondeley Goonewardene	LSSP	1956-1960
1960	Cholomondeley Goonewardene	LSSP	1960-1960
1960	Cholomondeley Goonewardene	LSSP	1960-1965
1965	Cholomondeley Goonewardene	LSSP	1965-1970
1970	Cholomondeley Goonewardene	LSSP	1970-1977
1977	V. L. Wijemanne	UNP	1977-1983
1983 (by)	V. L. Wijemanne	UNP	1983-1989

== Elections ==
=== 1947 Parliamentary General Election ===
Results of the 1st parliamentary election held between 23 August 1947 and 20 September 1947 for the district:

Candidate	Party	Symbol	Votes	%
Cholomondeley Goonewardene	Lanka Sama Samaja Party	Key	13,797	47.49
Upali Batuwantudawe		Elephant	11,827	39.92
H. Obeysekera		Cup	2,888	9.75
T. R. P. Perera		Flower	539	1.82
Valid Votes			29,051	98.06
Rejected Votes			575	1.94
Total Polled			29,626	100.00
Registered Electors			51,031	
Turnout				58.05

=== 1952 Parliamentary General Election ===
Results of the 2nd parliamentary election held between 24 May 1952 and 30 May 1952 for the district:

Candidate	Party	Symbol	Votes	%
P. Andrew Cooray	United National Party	Key	11,665	33.87%
Cholomondeley Goonewardene	Lanka Sama Samaja Party	Elephant	11,333	32.54
Upali Batuwantudawe		Star	9,914	28.46
A. P. de Zoysa		Hand	1,530	4.39
Valid Votes			34,442	98.88
Rejected Votes			389	1.12
Total Polled			34,831	100.00
Registered Electors			51,291	
Turnout				67.91

=== 1956 Parliamentary General Election ===
Results of the 3rd parliamentary election held between 5 April 1956 and 10 April 1956 for the district:

Candidate	Party	Symbol	Votes	%
Cholomondeley Goonewardene	Lanka Sama Samaja Party	Key	14,659	37.56
Upali Batuwantudawe	Sri Lanka Freedom Party	Hand	13,536	34.68
P. Andrew Cooray	United National Party	Elephant	10,551	27.03
Valid Votes			38,746	99.28
Rejected Votes			282	0.72
Total Polled			39,028	100.00
Registered Electors			57,930	
Turnout				67.37

=== 1960 (March) Parliamentary General Election ===
Results of the 4th parliamentary election held on 19 March 1960 for the district:

Candidate	Party	Symbol	Votes	%
Cholomondeley Goonewardene	Lanka Sama Samaja Party	Key	7,749	29.46
V. L. Wijemanne	United National Party	Elephant	6,984	2655
Kingsley Wickremasinghe		Sun	5,566	21.16
K. W. Silva	Sri Lanka Freedom Party	Hand	3,151	11.98
M. P. Perera	Communist Party	Star	1,675	6.37
S. D. P. Senaratne		Umbrella	700	2.66
C. E. Dalpatadu		Cockerel	309	1.17
Valid Votes			26,134	99.34
Rejected Votes			174	0.66
Total Polled			26,308	100.00
Registered Electors			33,209	
Turnout				79.22

=== 1960 (July) Parliamentary General Election ===
Results of the 5th parliamentary election held on 20 July 1960 for the district:

Candidate	Party	Symbol	Votes	%
Cholomondeley Goonewardene	Lanka Sama Samaja Party	Key	14,458	56.84
V. L. Wijemanne	United National Party	Elephant	10,489	41.24
Milton Wijekulatilleke		Winnow	202	0.79
K. N. E. P. Rajakaruna		Cart Wheel	184	0.72
Valid Votes			25,333	99.60
Rejected Votes			102	0.40
Total Polled			25,435	100.00
Registered Electors			33,209	
Turnout				76.59

=== 1965 Parliamentary General Election ===
Results of the 6th parliamentary election held on 22 March 1965 for the district:

Candidate	Party	Symbol	Votes	%
Cholomondeley Goonewardene	Lanka Sama Samaja Party	Key	17,705	52.43
Kingsley Wickremasinghe	United National Party	Elephant	15,667	46.39
W. Edward Samaranayake		Cockerel	188	0.56
Valid Votes			33,560	99.37
Rejected Votes			212	0.63
Total Polled			33,772	100.00
Registered Electors			39,439	
Turnout				85.63

=== 1970 Parliamentary General Election ===
Results of the 7th parliamentary election held on 27 May 1970 for the district:

Candidate	Party	Symbol	Votes	%
Cholomondeley Goonewardene	Lanka Sama Samaja Party	Key	23,696	57.27
V. L. Wijemanne	United National Party	Elephant	17,591	42.51
Valid Votes			41,287	99.78
Rejected Votes			90	0.22
Total Polled			41,377	100.00
Registered Electors			47,334	
Turnout				87.41

=== 1977 Parliamentary General Election ===
Results of the 8th parliamentary election held on 21 July 1977 for the district:

Candidate	Party	Symbol	Votes	%
V. L. Wijemanne	United National Party	Elephant	26,123	54.13
D. S. Indrapala Abeyweera	Sri Lanka Freedom Party	Hand	11,333	23.48
Cholomondeley Goonewardene	Lanka Sama Samaja Party	Key	10,453	21.66
K. W. Silva		Lamp	217	0.45
Valid Votes			48,126	99.73
Rejected Votes			132	0.27
Total Polled			48,258	100.00
Registered Electors			54,995	
Turnout				87.75
