= St. Sebastian's Church, Diyalagoda =

Roman Catholic church in Kalutara, Sri Lanka

- Sinhala: සා. සෙබස්තියන් දේවස්ථානය, දියලගොඩ
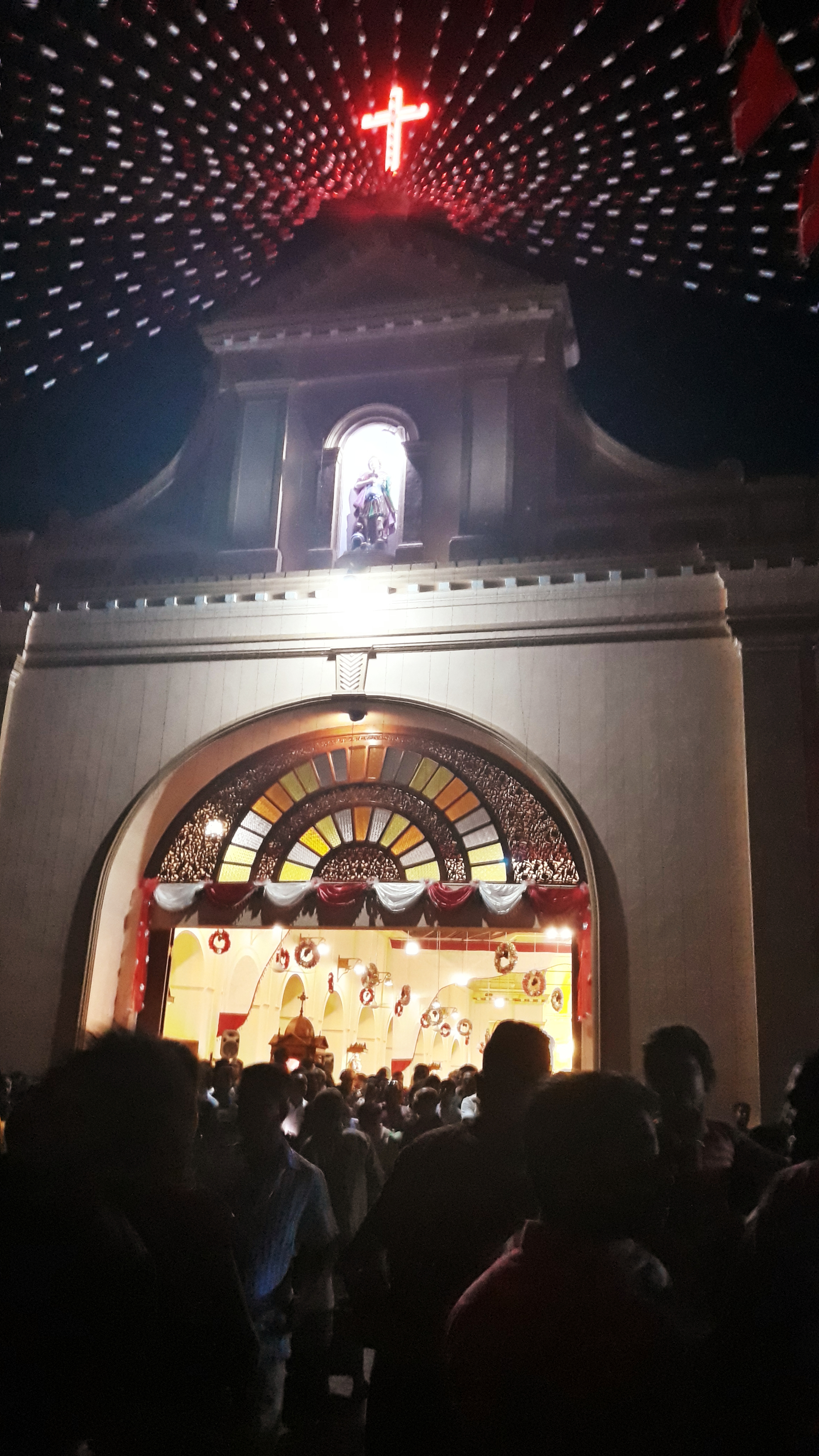
- St. Sebastian's Church, Diyalagoda
- 6.5094°N 79.9859°E
- Location: Diyalagoda, Maggona, Kalutara
- Country: Sri Lanka
- Languages: Sinhala; English (occasionally)
- Denomination: Roman Catholic

History
- Status: Parish Church
- Founded: 20 January 1844; 182 years ago
- Dedication: Saint Sebastian

Architecture
- Functional status: Active

Administration
- District: Kalutara
- Province: Western Province
- Archdiocese: Colombo Archdiocese
- Diocese: Colombo
- Parish: Diyalagoda Parish

St. Sebastian's Church, Diyalagoda (Sinhala: සා. සෙබස්තියන් දේවස්ථානය, දියලගොඩ) is a Roman Catholic church in the Archdiocese of Colombo, Sri Lanka. It is located in Diyalagoda, Kalutara. The church was established on the 20th of January 1844. It celebrates its annual feast on the 3rd Sunday of January.

St. Sebastian's Church was featured on a 5 rupee postal Christmas stamp, issued by the Sri Lankan government in 2007.
