= Kalutara Park SC =

Sri Lankan football club

Kalutara Park
- Full name: Kalutara Park Sports Club
- Ground: Kalutara Stadium, Kalutara
- Capacity: 15,000
- League: Kit Premier League

Kalutara Park Sports Club is a Sri Lankan football club based in Kalutara in the Kalutara District.

The team played in Sri Lanka Champions League, the second division of Sri Lankan football.

== League participations ==
- Sri Lankan Premier League: 2010–2011, 2013–
- Kit Premier League Division I: 2011–2012

== Stadium ==
Currently the team plays at the 15000 capacity Kalutara Stadium.

== Honours ==
- Kit Premier League Division I

Champions (1): 2011–12

== See also ==
- Sri Lanka Football Premier League
- List of top-division football clubs in AFC countries
