= Matara Bodhiya =

Sacred tree in Matara, Sri Lanka

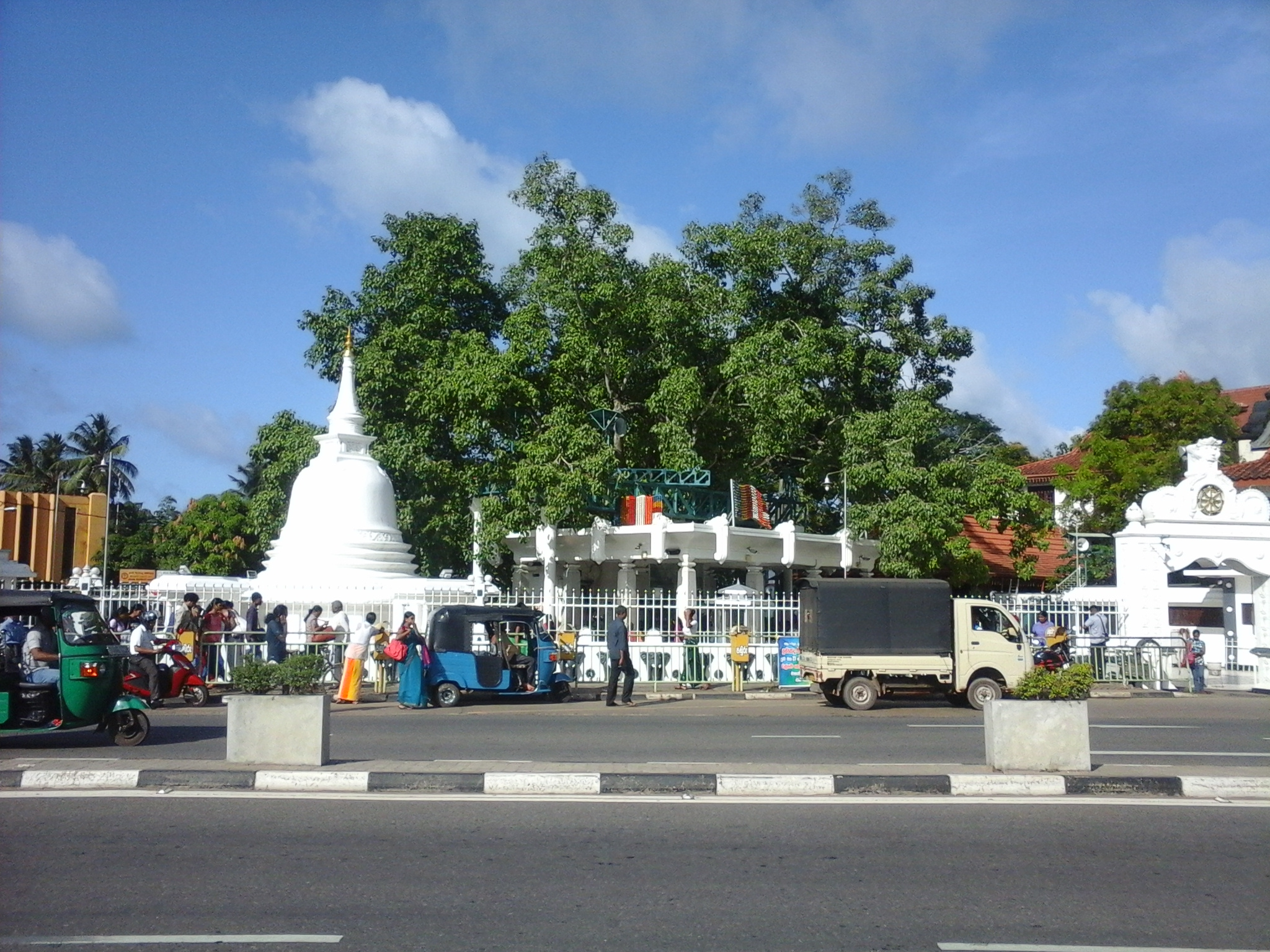
- Interactive map of Matara Bodhiya
- Species: Bodhi (Ficus religiosa)
- Location: Matara, Sri Lanka
- Coordinates: 5°56′54″N 80°32′50″E

Matara Bodhiya is a sacred fig tree in Matara, Sri Lanka.

Its origin can be traced back to a tragic story centred on King Kumara Dharmasena or Kumaradhatusena son of King Kasyapa of Sigiriya (512-522 AD) and his closet friend, Kalidasa, a famous dramatist and poet. According to the tale, the king whilst in the amorous company of a courtesan, spied a bee entangled in the petals of a lotus flower, inspired he wrote two poetic lines. He then offered a reward to anybody who could complete the other two stanzas to his poem. The cunning courtesan seized the opportunity took the verse to Kalidasa, who completed the poem. The courtesan then murdered Kalidasa in order to keep the reward for herself, concealing the body. The king however instantly recognised his friend's handwriting bringing the whole murderous ruse to light. When Kalidasa's dead body was taken to the funeral pyre for cremation, the grieving king unable to control his grief over the death of his beloved friend, threw himself into the burning flames and immolated himself. Upon witnessing this tragedy, five official queens also leapt into the flames to their deaths.

Local legend has it that seven Bo trees were planted over the seven tombs. These seven Bo trees are known locally as the "Hath Bodhis" and are said to be still surviving at six different places around Matara. Matara Bodhiya is one of those trees. It is respected and protected by the local buddhists.

In 1783 when the Dutch ruled Matara, a Dutch General is alleged to have cut down those seven Bo trees and had used their timber for the construction of local buildings, with only one having survived.

== Developing progress ==
While the British controlled the country they attempted to destroy this sacred tree but were thwarted by local buddhists, who protected the tree with their lives. The people who led the protection of the tree were merchants, police and buddhist officers on the urban council. A procession was organised from Kotuwegoda to bring a statue of Buddha, led by Daniel Abeysuriya, a local lawyer, who was also the vice president of Sinhala Maha Sabha. They placed the statue in front of the sacred tree and also supplied electricity with the help of other local buddhists. B. Ariyaratne, B. A. Siman Appuhami and K. P. Karanelis, who are the members of Bodhi Arakshaka Sabha, have committed to protect the Matara Bodhiya. In 1961 K. T. Somapala, C. A. Dharmasena and R. P. Pelis commenced the construction of a Stupa at the site.

== See also ==
- Bodhi tree
- Kalutara Bodhiya
