= V. L. Wijemanne =

Sri Lankan lawyer and politician

Vincent Leonald Wijemanne (31 October 1909 –21 March 1990) was a Sri Lankan lawyer and politician. Deputy Minister of state plantations and a member of the Parliament of Sri Lanka.

Born in Wilegoda, Kalutara, his father Abraham Wijemanne was the registrar in Kalutara and his mother was Rosalin Wijewickrama. He had six siblings who included Lt. Col. B. J. Wijemanne, MBE, ED founding commanding officer of the Ceylon Army General Service Corps. Educated at Holy Cross College, Kalutara, he qualified as an Advocate from the Ceylon Law College, he established his practice in the Unofficial Bar in Kalutara. He was the President of the Kalutara Bar Association.

He was elected to parliament in the 1977 general election from the United National Party from Kalutara, he was appointed Deputy Minister of state plantations. Following the poor performance in the 1982 referendum, he was asked to resign in 1983. He was re-elected in the following by-election, he was reappointed as Deputy Minister of state plantations and served till 1988. He was a close associate of Sir Cyril de Zoysa, he was one of the founders of Kalutara Vidyalaya, Kalutara Balika Vidyalaya and the Kalutara Tissa Central School and was a trustees of the Kalutara Bodhi Trust.

Wijemanne married Ira Gunathilake in 1944 and they had three daughters, Anoma, Damayanthi and Devika.
