= 2010–11 Sri Lanka Football Division =

This tournament is sponsored by Unique apparels. 14 teams are participated in two groups.

== Teams ==
Group A	Group B
Cooray SC - Colombo	Comerades SC - Badulla
Maligawatte SC - Colombo	Golden Stars - Kandy
Moragallmulla SC - Colombo	Green Field SC - Kalutara
Navy SC	Kandy York SC
Negambo Youth SC	Nandimitra SC
Pelicans SC - Kurunegala	Old Bens SC - Colombo
Red Sun SC - Gampola	Sarasavi SC - Rajagiriya (Colombo)
