= Kalutara Stadium =

Multi-use stadium in Kalutara, Sri Lanka

- කළුතර ක්‍රීඩාංගණය களுத்துறை ஸ்டேடியம்
- Kalutara Park Ground
- Interactive map of Kalutara Stadium
- Full name: Vernon U Fernando Stadium
- Location: Kalutara, Sri Lanka
- Coordinates: 6°35′11″N 79°57′47″E
- Capacity: 15,000

Tenants
- Blue Star SC, Kalutara Park SC, Super Beach SC, Greenfield SC

Kalutara Stadium (Sinhala: කළුතර ක්‍රීඩාංගණය), also known as Vernon U Fernando Stadium, is a multi-use stadium located in the centre of Kalutara, Sri Lanka. It is known locally as the Kalutara Park Ground.

== Overview ==
The stadium is primarily used for football matches and hosts the home games of Blue Star SC, who play in the Sri Lanka Champions League, Kalutara Park SC, who compete in the Kit Premier League Division I, Super Beach SC and Greenfield SC. The stadium holds 15,000 people.

The sport complex is named after Vernon Manilal Fernando, who was the President of Football Federation of Sri Lanka (FFSL) from 1979 to 1999, Vice President for Asian Football Confederation, Vice President of National Olympic Committee of Sri Lanka and served on the FIFA Executive Committee from 2011-2013. During his tenure as FFSL president he was responsible for establishing a network of dedicated football grounds across the country and the Sri Lanka Champions League, the top professional football league. In May 2013 FIFA suspended him for eight years for violating its code of ethics. In October 2013, the ban was extended for life. In March 2015, the International Sports Court confirmed the lifelong ban following an appeal by Fernando.

== International matches ==
Sri Lanka played Pakistan in an international friendly on 25 March 2002 at the stadium with the result of 2–1.
