= Kalutara prison riots =

Prison riot in Sri Lanka

The Kalutara Prison Riots occurred on 12 December 1997, at the high-security prison in Kalutara, Sri Lanka. Three minority Tamil political prisoners were killed by majority Sinhalese prisoners. No one has yet been convicted for these crimes.

== See also ==
- Welikada prison massacre
- Bindunuwewa prison massacre
- Black July
- Ethnic problem in Sri Lanka
- State terrorism in Sri Lanka
