= Kalu Ganga =

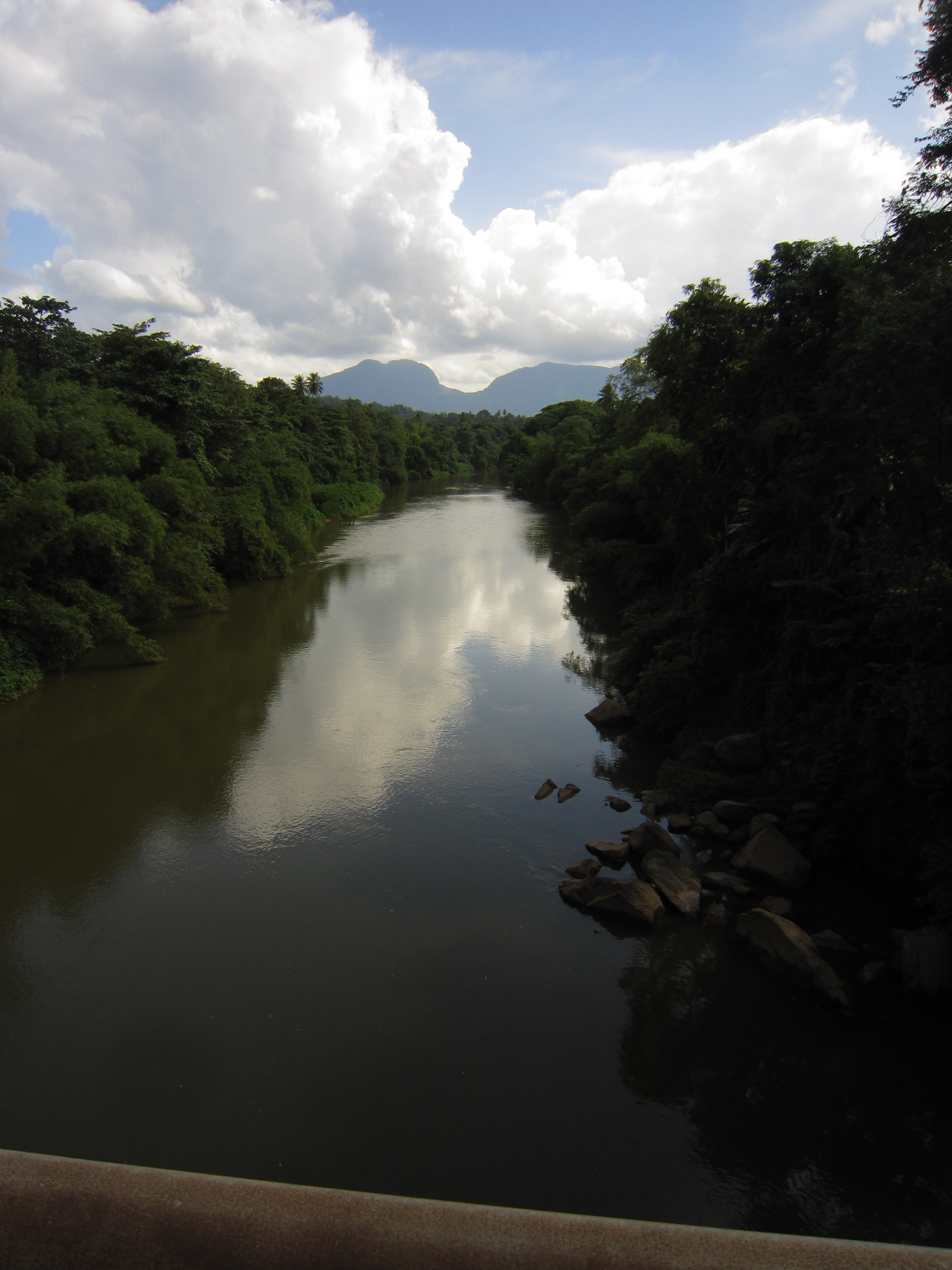
- Kalu Ganga in Palathota, Kalutara

- Kalu Ganga (Sri Lanka)
- Native name: කළු ගඟ (Sinhala)

Location
- Country: Sri Lanka

Physical characteristics
- Source: Sri Pada Peak Wilderness Sanctuary
  - elevation: 2,400 m (7,874 ft)
- Mouth: Indian Ocean
  - location: Kalutara
  - elevation: 1m
- Length: 129 km (80 mi)
- Basin size: 2,766 km^{2} (1,068 sq mi)

Basin features
- Tributaries
  - left: Kukule River, wey River, Denawaka River, Hangamu River
  - right: Kuru River, Induru River

Kalu Ganga (Sinhala: කළු ගඟ; literally: Black River) is a river in Sri Lanka. The river originates from Sri Pada Peak Wilderness Sanctuary, reaching the sea at Kalutara after a 129 km (80 mi) journey. The Black River flows through the Ratnapura and the Kalutara District and passes the city Ratnapura. The mountainous forests in the Central Province and the Sinharaja Forest Reserve are the main sources of water for the river. The Edwardian manor, Richmond Castle is on the banks of the river near Kalutara.

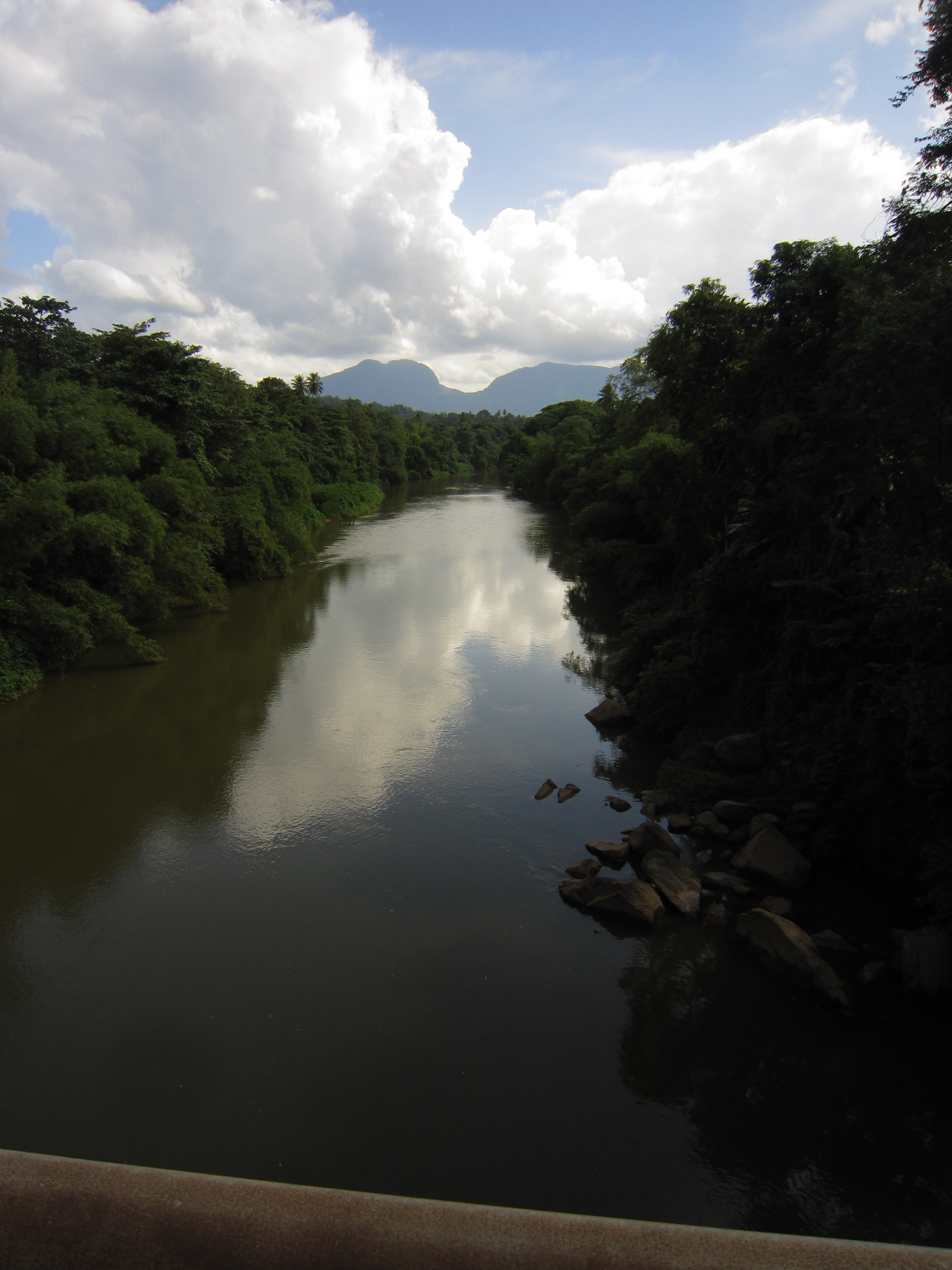
Downstream view, in Ratnapura.

== See also ==
- List of rivers in Sri Lanka
