= Kalutara Municipal Council =

Kalutara Municipal Council කළුතර මහා නගර සභාව களுத்துறை மகா மாநகர சபை

Type
- Type: Local authority

Leadership
- Mayor: Danuj Somaratne, (NPP) since 6 May 2025
- Deputy Mayor: TBA
- Municipal Commissioner: D. N. Piyumali Kularatne

Structure
- Seats: 31
- Political groups: Government: NPP (12); Opposition: SJB (8); SLMC (3); UNP (3); SLPP (1); PA (1); SB (1); NFF (1); Ind (1)

Elections
- Voting system: open list proportional representation system
- Last election: 6 May 2025
- Next election: TBA

Meeting place
- Riverside Rd, Kalutara

Website
- https://www.kalutara.mc.gov.lk/

Kalutura Municipal Council (KMC) is the local authority for the town of Kalutara in the Kalutara District, Western Province, Sri Lanka. The KMC is responsible for providing a variety of local public services including roads, sanitation, drains, housing, libraries, public parks and recreational facilities. It has 31 councillors elected using an open list proportional representation system.

== History ==
The Kalutara Urban Council was established in 1878 as the Kalutara Divisional Health Council. The inaugural Divisional Health Council consisted of a chairman, two officers and three elected members. The first elected chairman was T. R. Sonders and the first secretary was H. H. Kamoran.

The Divisional Health Council operated between 1878 and 15 December 1922.

The first Urban Council meeting was held on 6 January 1923 and the first elected chairman was Arthur D. Abrew.

The population of the Kalutara Urban Council is 37,081 and the area is 19.8 km^{2} (7.6 sq mi).

== Election results ==
=== 2025 local government election ===
Results of the local government elections held on 6 May 2025.

Alliances and parties	Votes	%	Seats
National People's Power	13,945	39.23%	12
Samagi Jana Balawegaya	9,290	26.13%	8
Sri Lanka Muslim Congress	3,562	10.02%	3
United National Party	3,048	8.57%	3
Sri Lanka Podujana Peramuna	1,550	4.36%	1
People's Alliance	1,417	3.99%	1
National Freedom Front	905	2.55%	1
Independent Group	857	2.41%	1
Sarvajana Balaya	574	1.61%	1
People's Struggle Alliance	293	0.82%	0
New Lanka Freedom Party	107	0.30%	0
Valid Votes	35,548	100.00%	31
Rejected Votes	542		
Total Polled	36,090		
Registered Electors	56,280		
Turnout	64.13%		

=== 2018 local government election ===
Results of the local government elections held on 8 February 2018.

Alliances and parties	Votes	%	Seats
United National Party	8,605	43.96%	9
Sri Lanka Podujana Peramuna	6,333	32.35%	5
United People's Freedom Alliance (NC, ACMC, SLFP et al.)	1,722	8.80%	2
Janatha Vimukthi Peramuna	1,459	7.45%	1
All Ceylon Makkal Congress	907	4.63%	1
Independent Group	514	2.63%	1
National People's Party	19	0.10%	0
Nava Sama Samaja Party	15	0.08%	0
Valid Votes	19,574	100.00%	20
Rejected Votes	350		
Total Polled	19,924		
Registered Electors	25,044		
Turnout	78.58%		

=== 2011 local government election ===
Results of the local government elections held on 17 March 2011.

Alliances and parties	Votes	%	Seats
United National Party	8,571	55.59%	7
United People's Freedom Alliance (NC, ACMC, SLFP et al.)	5,822	37.76%	4
People's Liberation Front	652	4.23%	0
Independent Group 1	221	1.43%	0
Independent Group 2	132	0.86%	0
United Democratic Front	11	0.07%	0
Independent Group 3	5	0.03%	0
Patriotic National Front	4	0.03%	0
Valid Votes	15,418	100.00%	11
Rejected Votes	539		
Total Polled	15,957		
Registered Electors	23,308		
Turnout	68.46%		
