= Kalutara Chaitya =

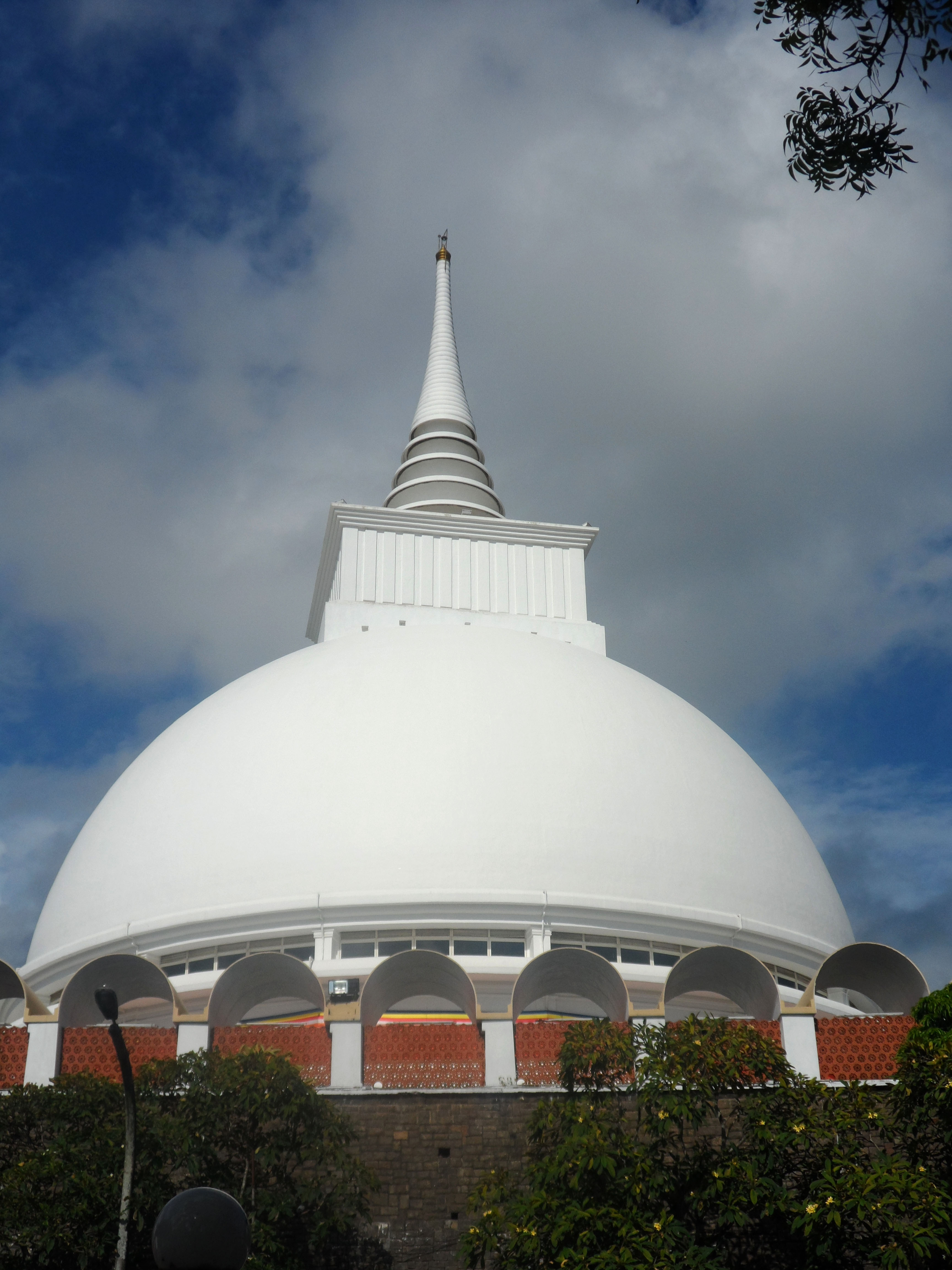
- The white concrete stupa - Kalutara Chaitya

- Location in Sri Lanka

Religion
- Affiliation: Theravada Buddhism
- Patron: Sir Cyril de Zoysa
- Status: open

Location
- Country: Sri Lanka
- Interactive map of Kalutara Chaitya
- Coordinates: 6.586944°N 79.9602786°E

Architecture
- Architect: Justin Samarasekera
- General contractor: State Engineering Corporation of Sri Lanka
- Groundbreaking: 1964
- Completed: 1974
- Dome dia. (outer): 30.5 m (100 ft)

Website
- http://www.kalutarabodhiya.com/

The Kalutara Chaitya is a Stupa (buddhist shrine) located immediately south of the Kalutara Bridge in the Kalutara District of Sri Lanka.

It is one of only a few hollow Buddhist stupas in the world and its interior contains 74 murals, each depicting a different aspect of the Buddha's life. Four small chaityas (stupas) are located inside the larger hollow stupa and on the walls of the larger stupa, scenes from Jataka tales are painted. Visitors can walk inside the Kalutara Chaitya to worship and to look at the statues and wall paintings of the stories of Buddha.

The stupa was commissioned by Sir Cyril de Zoysa, with the design undertaken by Justin Samarasekera in collaboration with A. N. S. Kulasinghe. The construction was carried out by the State Engineering Corporation of Sri Lanka, whose computer (the first in the country) enabled the complicated calculations to be carried out. The large 30.5 m (100 ft) diameter and 91.5 m (300 ft) circumference concrete dome has a thin shell with a thickness of 140 mm (5.5 in). It was the first thin hemispherical shell built in the country.

The site of the stupa was originally occupied by the Gangatilaka Vihara, however it was destroyed by the Portuguese when they invaded the country. The Portuguese subsequently built a fort on the small hill. The Dutch rebuilt and expanded the fort, which was surrendered to the British in 1796. The fort was converted into the office and residence of the Government agent. During the British colonial era, Galle Road was constructed between the Uda Maluva and the Pahala Maluva, splitting the site into two separate sections. The Kalutara Bodhiya, one of 32 saplings of the sacred Jaya Sri Maha Bodhi, was shared with the official residence of the Government agent and the local Kachcheri. De Zoysa persuaded the government to relocate the agent's residence and offices to a site he owned in Nagoda, in order to allow the development and restoration of the Bodhi premises.

The foundation was laid in 1964, and the pinnacle of the Chaitya was topped in January 1974. The pinnacle was unveiled and relics deposited in the inner chamber by President J. R. Jayewardene on 28 February 1980.

== See also ==
- Ancient stupas of Sri Lanka
