= Kalutara =

City in Sri Lanka

Kalutara කළුතර களுத்துறை
- City
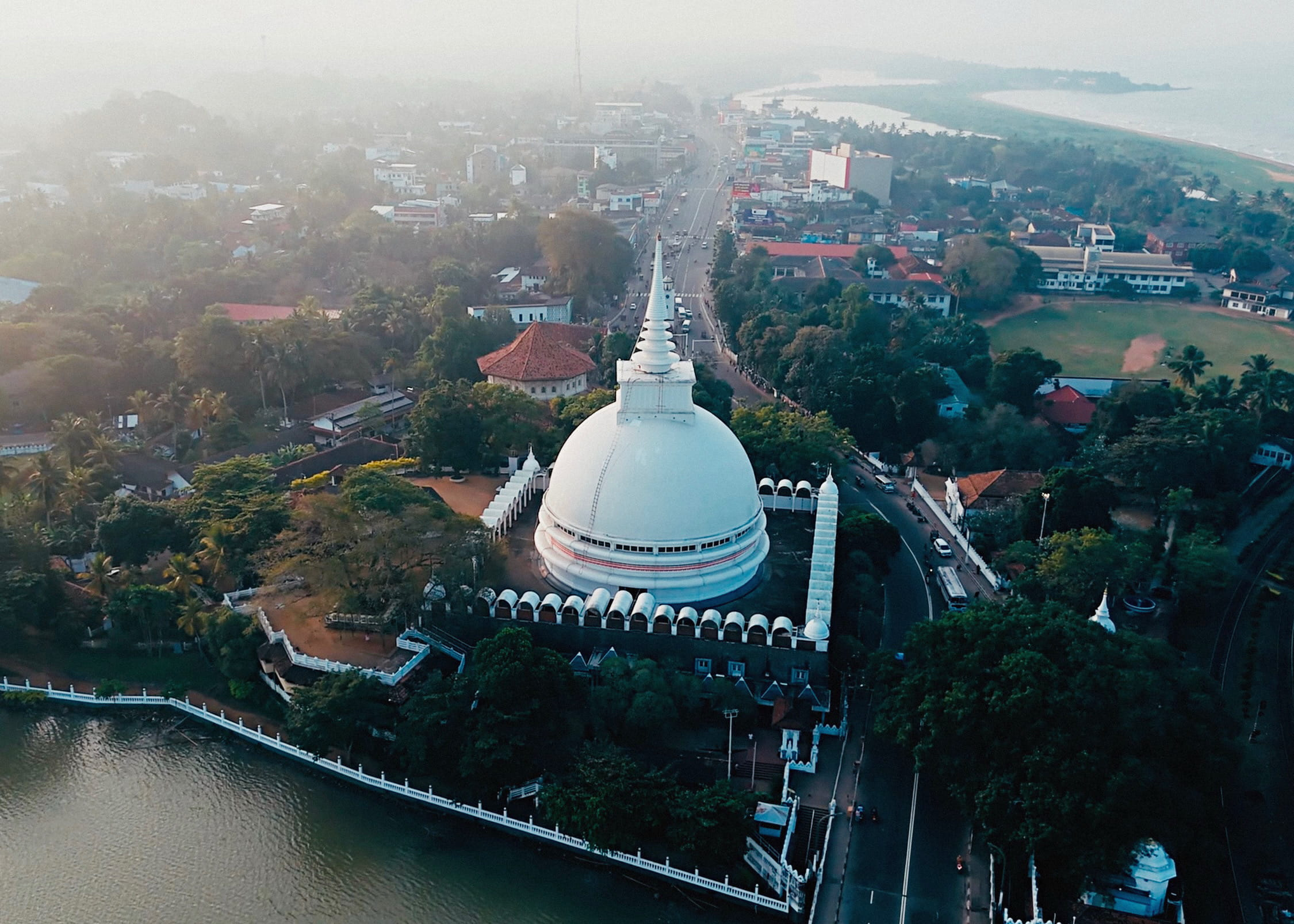
- Skyline view of Kalutara

- Location within Sri Lanka
- Coordinates: 6°35′13″N 79°57′37″E
- Province: Western Province
- District: Kalutara District
- Divisional Secretariat: Kalutara Division

Government
  - Type: Kalutara Municipal Council
  - Chairman: M. Ameer Nazeer

Population (2012)
  - Urban: 37,081 (Municipal Council Area)
  - Metro: 159,697 (Kalutara Division Area)
- Time zone: UTC+5:30 (Sri Lanka Standard Time)

Kalutara (Sinhala: කළුතර, Tamil: களுத்துறை) or Kalutota is a major city in Kalutara District, Western Province, Sri Lanka. It is also the administrative capital of Kalutara District. It is located approximately 43 km (27 mi) south of the capital Colombo. The city holds a unique position for one of the four major rivers in Sri Lanka, the Kalu Ganga, which joins the sea at the centre of the city. Kaluthara is known for making rope, baskets, and other articles from the fibre of the coconut palm. The area also produces the Mangosteens, a fruit introduced from Malaysia in the 19th century.

== Etymology ==
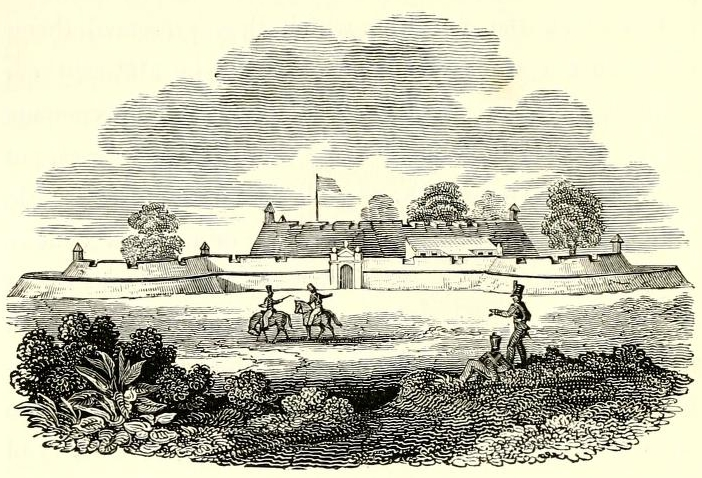
Caltura Fort (1799), by James Welsh.

Once an important spice-trading centre, the town's name is derived from the Kalu Ganga ('Black River' in native Sinhala). In the 11th century, the town was temporarily made a capital on the orders of a South Indian Prince. The region was later planted with coconut trees, whose by-products are used for both internal and external trade. The location also boast fortifications (Kalutara fort) dating back from the times when Portuguese, Dutch and British vied for control of the area.

The 38 m (125 ft) long Kalutara Bridge was built at the mouth of the Kalu Ganga River and serves as a major link between the country's western and southern border.

The name Kalutara is a name broken from the name Kalutota. The name Kalugantota became Kalutota and then Kalutara. One of the first occasions mentioned in history about Kalutara is because the Chola prince Parakrama Pandya Perumal made Kalutara his capital (Kalatittha). The other occasion was when the village of Yodunpahe or Pasyodune was cultivated by King Maha Parakumba between Kalutara and Bentara. Kalutara is mentioned again during the journey of King Parakumba II, who came to worship at Benthota Galapata temple during the Dambadeni period, when the Rajarata kingdoms began to expand to the southwest. During the Gampaha period, the Arya Chakravarthi kings of the Tamil kingdom of Jaffna passed Panadura and took the people to Kalutara. (Rajavaliya). Gampala And in the epic poems written during the Kotte eras, there are precious comments about Kalutara and the temple located there (Gangathilaka Viharaya-Kalutara Bodhi). In each of these epic poems, it is mentioned that the location of Kalutara is right in the middle of Pothupitiya and Kalamulla villages.

A lot of information is heard about Kalutara during the Kotte era. It is said that Prince Tinthadu Muditta Perumal Thennakone was brought from Soly country to become the king after King Parakumba VI. (Rajawaliya) Because that prince did not own the kingdom of Lanka, he was allowed to enjoy his life as long as the sun and moon lasted, so that his descendants could enjoy it as long as the sun and moon lasted. And Pasdun made a hundred villages in Korale Nindagam(නින්දගම). Kalutara is one of them. The Tudugala Tennakone royal family has been the nominal kings of the Kalutara regional state (Tudugala Bandaravaliya-තුඩුගල පරපූර) since then. In the last period of the Kotte period, the Portuguese power in Kalutara was strong and the legend mentions a prince who attacked Pratigalun who was occupying Kalutara. Raigama converted to Catholicism because of Princess Bandara's visit to Tammi from the Palace of Yakunduwa, and acted in favor of the Portuguese, but later carried out an anti-Portuguese practice. It is mentioned. (Varshakandarashtra). The Salagama army attacked Kalutara Pratigal Wadi and chased Pratigal and then established power in Panadura fortress.

After the destruction of the Catholic church in Kalamulla by "Don Susev" of Hulsfdorp Mountain (Wulfandal), the assistant of prince "Vediye Bandara" in Kalutara, the arrival of anti-gal forces blocked the northern entrance of Kalamulla with thornbushes and the current Katukurunda is the same. The land (the tombu of the generation of "Susevhevage" generation).

It was after the Portuguese era that the fierce caste wars that commemorated Kalutara city in history began. During the Portuguese period, a large group of Salagama people landed from Madampe(Amabaangoda) and settled in Waskaduwa, Pothupitiya, Deshastra and Kalamulla. Therefore, Karawa and Salagama conflicts occurred regularly around Kalutara town. To the north of Kalutara, Vaskaduwa Salagama was a powerful territory and after attacking the Kalutara Karawa people, the Karawa caste started a silent cold war when they saw that the exit doors to the Karawa people were blocked from Kalamulla and Waskaduwa. By the Salagama community of "Susewhewa", a very violent community group In 1621 AD, Pratigalun broke down the temple of Kalutara Gangathilaka and started the construction of Kalutara Fort. Baby Jesus Cathedral After the construction of Domingo Cathedral Waskaduwa(After the baptism of the Salagama group of "Susevhewage", a fierce group) the entire Kalutara area became Catholic. The use of Catholic surnames became popular because of baptism. It is said that he was adopted (Tombu of Susevhewa descendants) At this time, Kalutara port emerged as a headquarters of the cinnamon trade, and Susevhewa's(The mother part of Waskaduwe Sri Subhuthi Thero) descendants and the Seram (Saram Mudali) descendants were like flag giants who took the initiative in all activities of Kalutara society. (Wolfendahl Street) Catholic and Protestant Christians. Conflicts were a common sight in Kalutara during the Dutch period and it developed into a sub-caste conflict of the same caste (conflicts between the upper sub-castes of Salagama caste and Hinna). At the Kalutara Report Office.

When the English captured the Dutch Fort in 1797, they established a Kachcheri there. Since that time, Kalutara has become the head office of the Kalutara district.

== Administration ==
Kalutara is governed by an Urban Council with a chairman. The council has 20 (since 2018) members, elected by the local government election. The local board of Kalutara was established in 1878. Then in 1923, the local board was succeeded by the Urban District Council.

== Demographics ==
Kalutara is Sinhalese majority city. Muslims are second largest group in the city. There are also small numbers of Sri Lankan Tamils and Indian Tamils. Others include Malay and Burger. English is widely understood and can be spoken by the local population.

=== Ethnicity according to Kalutara urban area (2001) ===
Ethnicity in Kalutara Urban Area
Population	Percent
Sinhalese	70.85%
Muslims	29.10%
Sri Lankan Tamils	0.50%
Indian Tamils	0.20%
Others	0.07%

Source:statistics.gov.lk

== Attractions ==
- Kalutara or Gangatilaka Vihara was built in the 1960s to the south of the Kalutara Bridge, is Kalutara's most dominant landmark. The white three-storey-high dagoba at Kalutara Vihara is believed to be the only Buddha Stupa in the world which is entirely hollow. It contains a smaller dagoba inside. The interior of the Stupa is decorated with paintings of the Jataka tales about the life of the Buddha.
- Kalutara Bodhiya is one of the most sacred Buddha Buddhist sites in Sri Lanka. It is one of the 32 saplings of Anuradhapura Sri Maha Bodiya. Kalutara Bodiya is located on Colombo-Galle road.
- Richmond Castle, Kalutara is a two-storey mansion, built in 1896, at Palatota. Richmond Castle is a 42-acre fruit garden estate, originally built for a wealthy regional governor. The architecture is a mix of British and Indian styles, copied from the plans of an Indian Maharaja's palace designed by a London architect. The building has intricate carvings.
- Calido beach is a thin strip of preserved land which runs between the Kalu River and the Indian Ocean.
- Asokaramaya Buddhist Temple is a Buddhist temple built in 1873, in Kalutara north.
- Kalutara Clock Tower, constructed by Marcus Silva as a memorial for his father, Paul Silva and his mother.
- St. Sebastian's Church, Diyalagoda, 19th-century Roman Catholic church building

== Education ==
Kalutara has four national schools, eleven provincial schools, two semi-government schools, and three international schools. It also has a branch of Open University of Sri Lanka. A number of the schools and colleges are listed below:

- Gnanodaya Maha Vidyalaya, Kalutara
- Gurulugomi Maha Vidyalaya, Kalutara
- Holy Cross College, Kalutara
- Holy Family Convent, Kalutara
- Aquinas College of Higher Studies, Kalutara Branch
- JMC International College, Kalutara
- Kalutara Vidyalaya, Kalutara
- Kalutara Balika Vidyalaya, Kalutara
- Muslim Central College, Kalutara
- R. D. K College, Kalutara
- Tissa Central College, Kalutara
- Velapura Maha Vidyalaya, Kalutara
- Vidura College, Kalutara

Kalutara Public library is located near the High Court and one of the largest libraries of Sri Lanka.

== Infrastructure ==
=== Rail ===
Kalutara has two railway stations, Kalutara North and Kalutara South. Kalutara South is closest to the heart of the Kalutara town. Kalutara south railway station is a major railway hub on the Coastal or Southern Rail Line (connecting Colombo through to Matara).

=== Road ===
Kalutara is located on the A2 highway connecting Colombo, via Galle through to Wellawaya via Matara. As a result, a large number of bus services pass through the town. It is the main point for bus routes in Kalutara district.

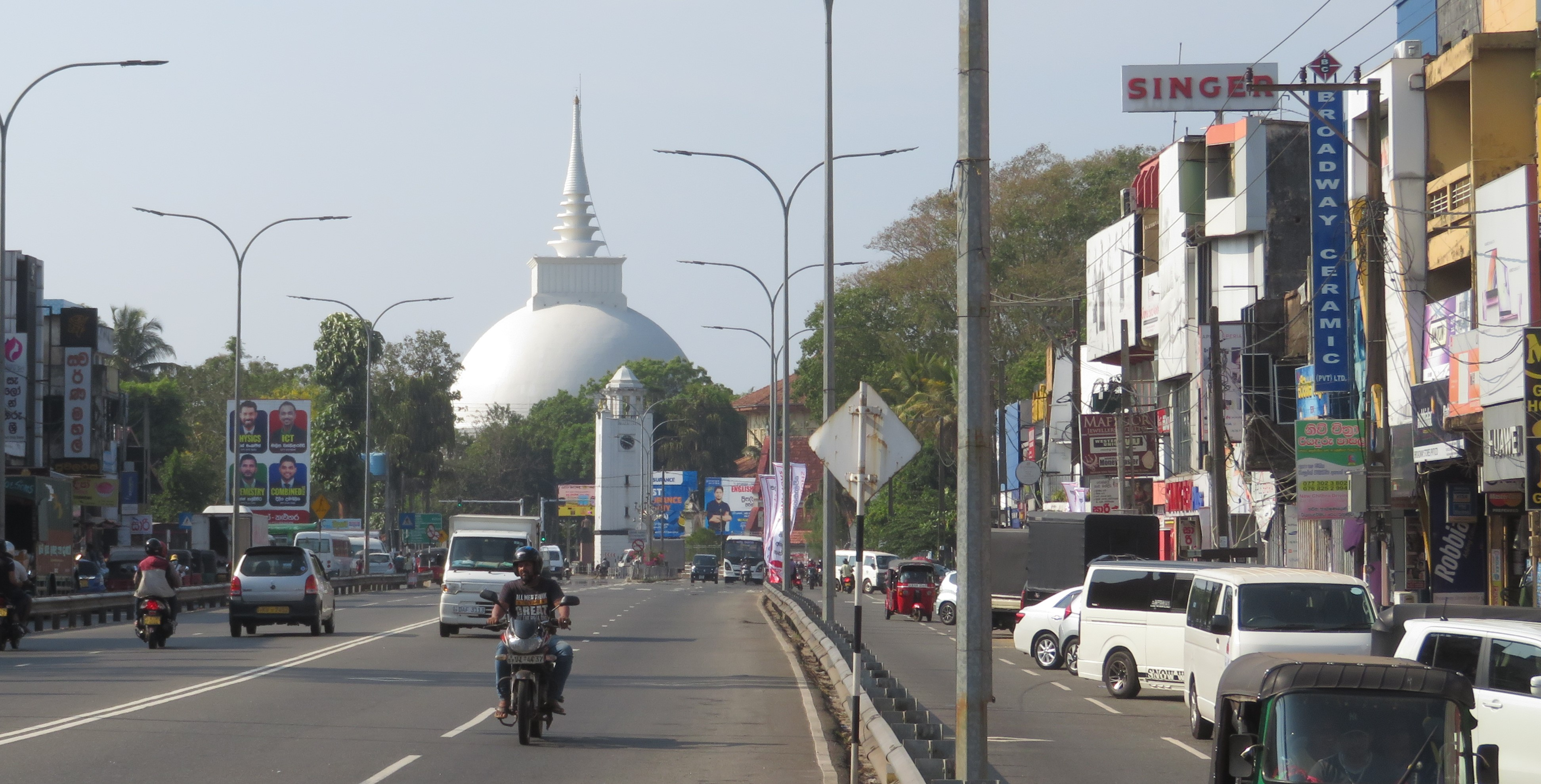
Galle Road

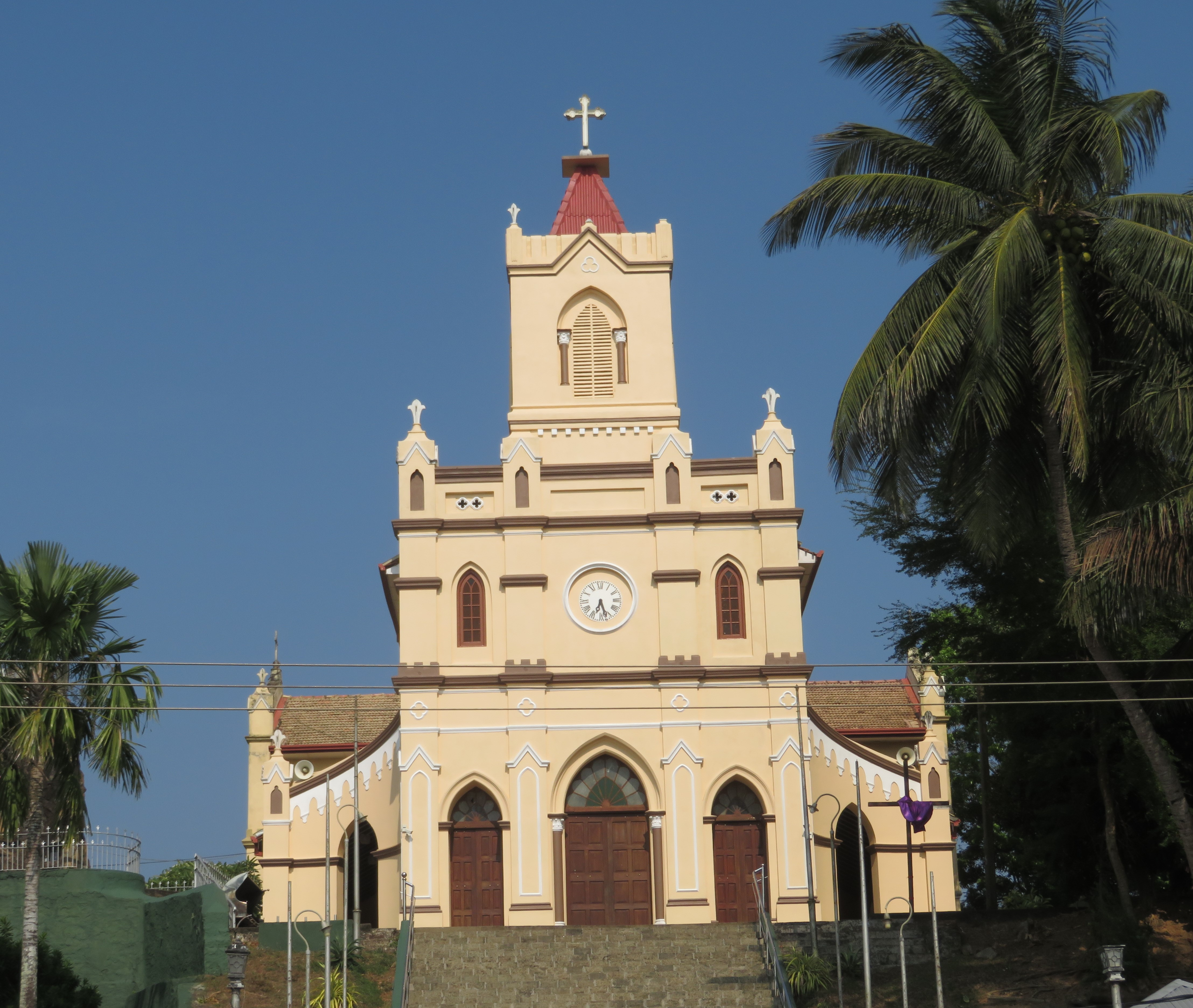
Holy Cross Church

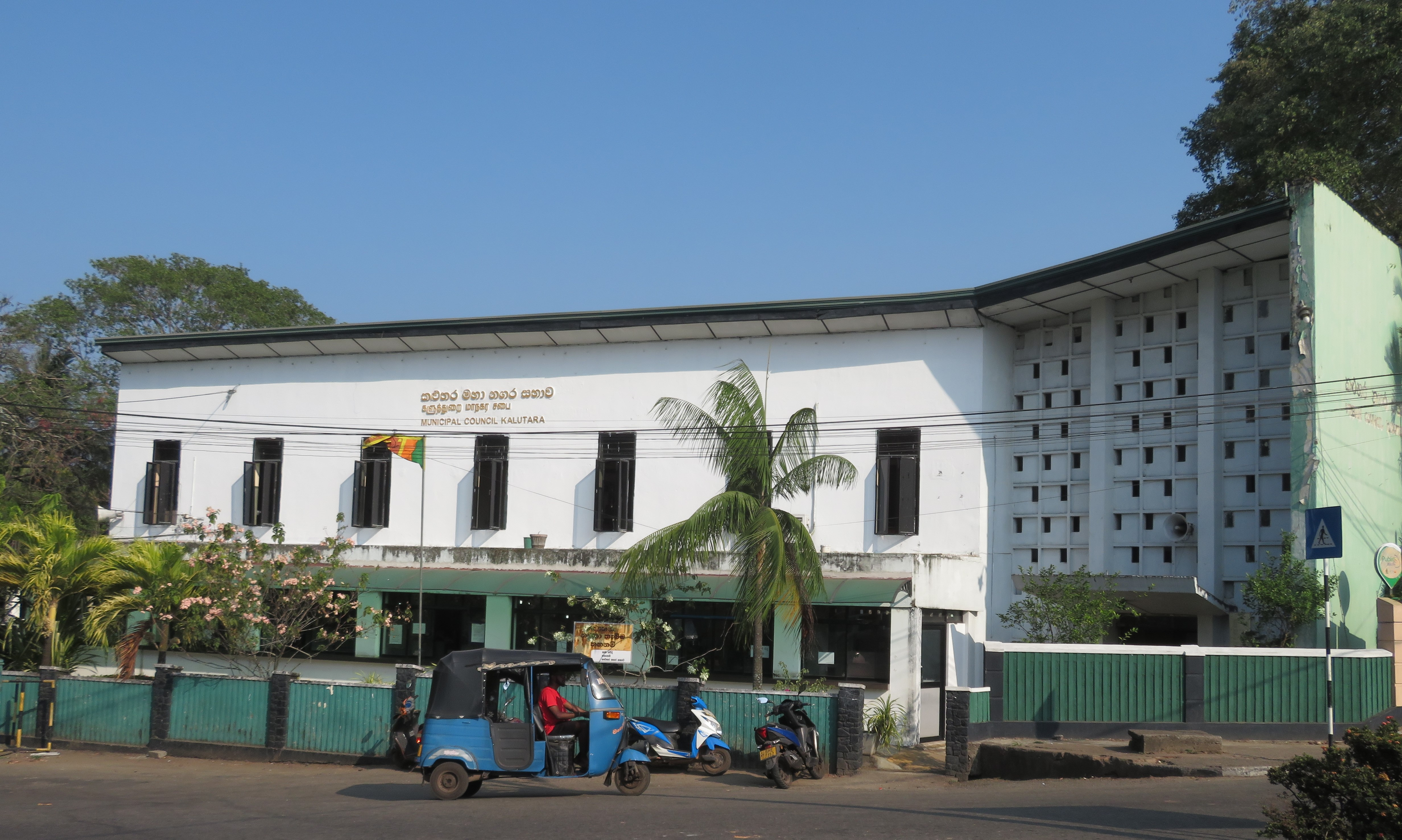
Municipal Council

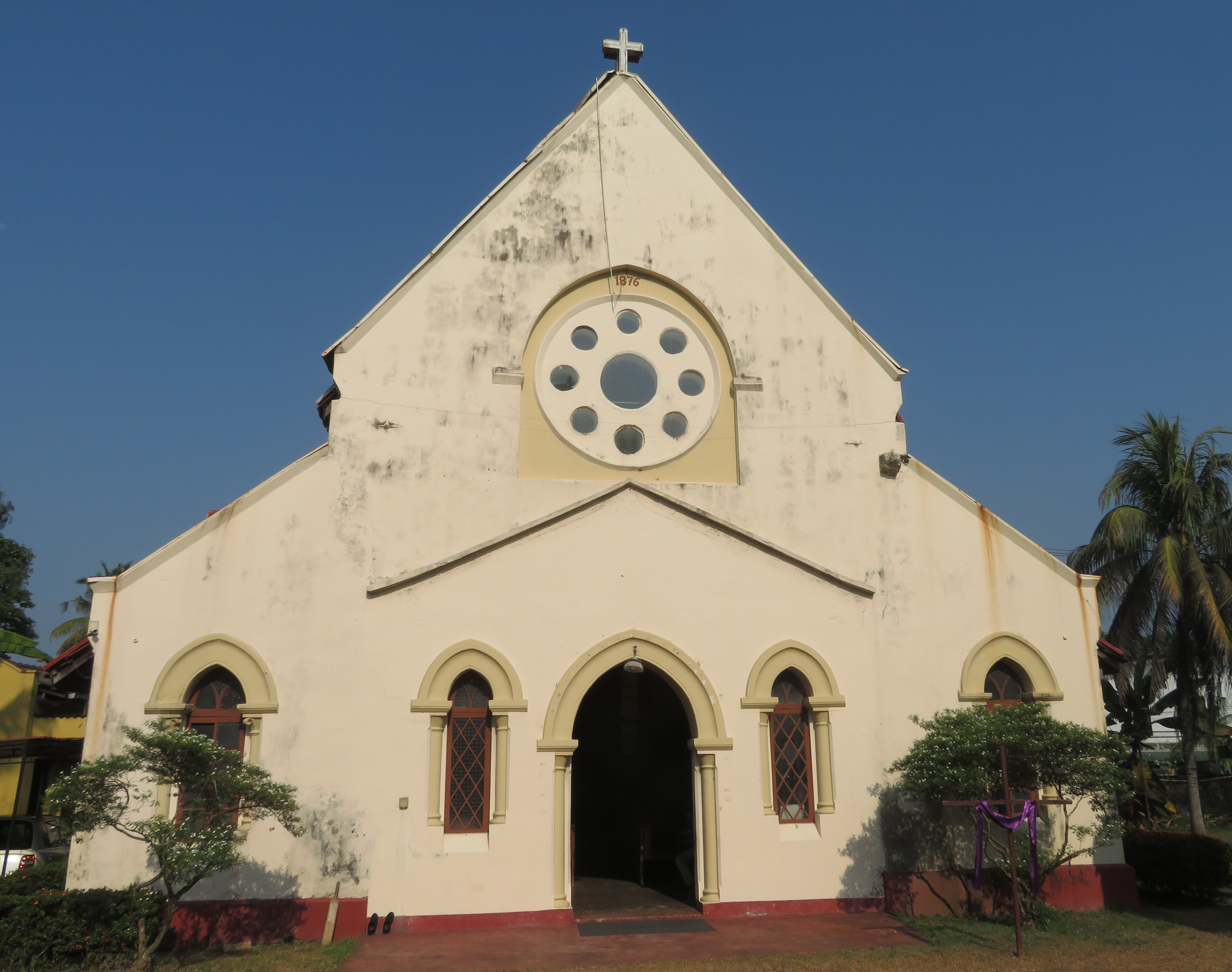
St. John's Church

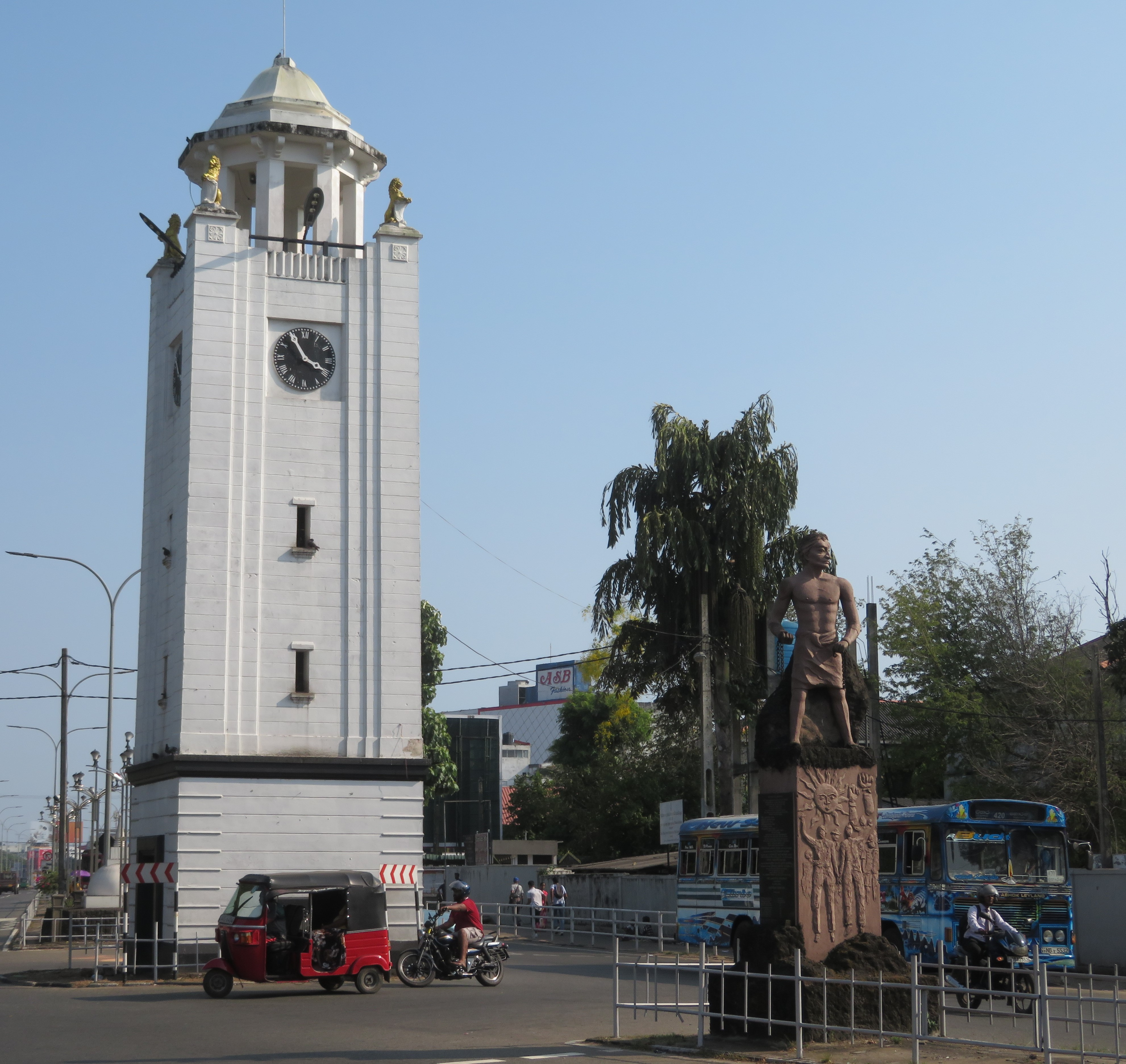
Clock Tower and Independence Monument

== See also ==
- Kalutara (disambiguation)
- Kalutara Municipal Council
- Kalutara District
- Kalutara prison riots
- Kalutara Park SC, a Sri Lankan football club
- Kalutara Physical Culture Centre, a former first class cricket team
- Kalutara Town Club, a first-class cricket team
- Kalutara Stadium
- Surrey Village Cricket Ground, at Maggona, about 10 kilometres south of Kalutara
- Katukurunda Airport located about 4.5 kilometers south of Kalutara
