= Sulanjana Raul =

Indian footballer

Personal information
- Full name: Sulanjana Raul
- Date of birth: 4 June 2007 (age 19)
- Place of birth: Bhagabanpur, Purba Medinipur, West Bengal, India
- Height: 1.50 m (4 ft 11 in)
- Position: Forward

Team information
- Current team: East Bengal
- Number: 22

Senior career*
Years	Team	Apps	(Gls)
- Dipti Sangha FC
–2022	ASOS Rainbow		
2022–	East Bengal		

International career^{‡}
2023	India U17	1	(0)
2025–	India U20	12	(6)
- * Club domestic league appearances and goals as of 10 August 2025 ‡ National team caps and goals as of 10 August 2025

Sulanjana Raul (born 4 June 2007) is an Indian professional footballer from West Bengal, who plays as a forward for the Indian Women's League club East Bengal. She has also represented India at the youth level internationally.

== Career ==
In 2022–23 Calcutta Women's Football League, she won her champion's medal as a part of champion team with golden ball award for becoming best emerging Player of the Tournament while playing for East Bengal.

In 2023–24 Calcutta Women's Football League, she won the golden boot for netting 17 goals for East Bengal.

She is currently considered as the highest goalscorer in the history of East Bengal Women's team.

== Personal life ==
Sulanjana hails from a rural village of Bhagabanpur, near the western border of Purba Medinipur district of West Bengal. Her father is a farmer, but she has always credited him to encourage her though facing difficulties. She is a fan of Lionel Messi and Sunil Chhetri.

== Honours ==
East Bengal

- SAFF Women's Club Championship: 2025
- Indian Women's League: 2024–25, 2025–26
- Calcutta Women's Football League (2): 2022–23, 2024–25; runner-up: 2023–24
- Women's IFA Shield: 2023
