= Anthony Andrews (football manager) =

Indian football manager (born 1996)

Personal information
- Full name: Anthony Samson Andrews
- Date of birth: 30 January 1996 (age 30)
- Place of birth: Bhusawal, Maharashtra, India

Team information
- Current team: East Bengal (head coach)

Managerial career
- Years: Team
- 2012–2017: PIFA Sports (youth)
- 2017–2019: Minerva Punjab (youth)
- 2019–2020: ARA (assistant)
- 2020–2021: Rebels FC
- 2021–2024: Gokulam Kerala
- 2024–: East Bengal
- 2026–: India U17 (women) (assistant)

Anthony Samson Andrews (born 30 January 1996) is an Indian football manager who is currently the head coach of the Indian Women's League club East Bengal. He also serves as the assistant coach of the India women's under-17 team.

== Coaching career ==
Andrews had his first coaching job as youth and reserve team coach at PIFA Sports and Minerva Academy. He then joined as manager of the I-League 2nd Division club ARA and the Karnataka state tier club Rebels FC.

=== Gokulam Kerala ===
Andrews was named first-team manager of Gokulam Kerala for the 2021–22 Indian Women's League. Gokulam Kerala has extended its contract with Andrews as the head coach of its women's team until 2025. Under his coaching, Gokulam Kerala became the first Indian women's club to complete a hat-trick of top tier titles by winning the Indian Women's League in the 2021–22 and 2022–23 season.

== Managerial statistics ==
As of 23 August 2026

All competitive games (league, domestic and continental cups) are included.

Managerial record by team and tenure
Team	From	To	Record				
Team	From	To	P	W	D	L	Win %
Gokulam Kerala	2021	2024	46	39	5	2	84.8
East Bengal	2024	present	50	42	3	5	84.0
Total			96	81	8	7	84.4

== Honours ==
=== Honours ===
Gokulam Kerala Women

- Indian Women's League: 2021–22, 2022–23
- Kerala Women's League: 2021–22

East Bengal Women

- Indian Women's League: 2024–25, 2025–26
- Calcutta Women's Football League: 2024–25, 2025–26
