= 2023 Women's IFA Shield =

Tournament details
- Country: India
- Dates: 25 May – 2 June
- Teams: 6

Final positions
- Champions: East Bengal (1st title)
- Runners-up: Sreebhumi

Tournament statistics
- Matches played: 9
- Goals scored: 51 (5.67 per match)
- Top goal scorer: Tulsi Hembram (15 goals)

Awards
- Best player: Tulsi Hembram

The 2023 Women's IFA Shield was the inaugural edition of the Women's IFA Shield, the premier women's football cup competition organized by the Indian Football Association in West Bengal. It had 6 teams participating in the edition including Indian Women's League team – East Bengal and other five Kanyashree Cup teams – Sreebhumi, Mohammedan Sporting, Chandney SC, WB Police and Nadia DSA. The inaugural edition was held at the Tehatta and Krishnanagar City of Nadia District in West Bengal. On 2 June 2023, East Bengal defeated Sreebhumi 5–0 in the final to lift the inaugural Women's IFA Shield title.

== Teams ==
- East Bengal
- Sreebhumi
- Mohammedan Sporting
- Chandney SC
- WB Police
- Nadia DSA

== Group stage ==
=== Group A ===
Pos	Team	Pld	W	D	L	GF	GA	GD	Pts	
1	East Bengal	2	2	0	0	19	0	+19	6	Advance to the semi-finals
2	Chandney SC	2	1	0	1	4	12	−8	3	Advance to the semi-finals
3	Nadia DSA	2	0	0	2	1	12	−11	0	

Source: IFAWB

==== Matches ====
25 May 2023	East Bengal	8–0	Nadia DSA	Tehatta
15:30 IST	Tulsi Hembram 6', 23', 61'; Mousumi Murmu 22', 41', 80'; Sushmita Bardhan 29'; Sulanjana Raul 71'	Report		Stadium: Harichand Guruchand Krirangan

27 May 2023	Chandney SC	4–1	Nadia DSA	Tehatta
15:30 IST	Koyel Mazumdar; Kajali Deheri (2); Poonam Baria		Ankita Santra	Stadium: Harichand Guruchand Krirangan

29 May 2023	East Bengal	11–0	Chandney SC	Tehatta
15:30 IST	Tulsi Hembram 1', 5', 34', 48', 50', 55'; Mousumi Murmu 2', 46', 58'; Barnali Karar 19'; Sulanjana Raul 90+3' (pen.)	Report		Stadium: Harichand Guruchand Krirangan

=== Group B ===
Pos	Team	Pld	W	D	L	GF	GA	GD	Pts	
1	Sreebhumi	2	2	0	0	9	0	+9	6	Advance to the semi-finals
2	West Bengal Police	2	0	1	1	2	5	−3	1	Advance to the semi-finals
3	Mohammedan Sporting	2	0	1	1	2	8	−6	1	

Source: IFAWB

==== Matches ====
25 May 2023	Sreebhumi	6–0	Mohammedan Sporting	Krishnanagar
15:30 IST	Sarjida Khatun (3); Titli Sarkar (2); Sujata Mahata			Stadium: Krishnanagar Ground

27 May 2023	Sreebhumi	3–0	West Bengal Police	Krishnanagar
15:30 IST	Titli Sarkar (3)			Stadium: Krishnanagar Ground

29 May 2023	Mohammedan Sporting	2–2	West Bengal Police	Krishnanagar
15:30 IST	Sonali Soren 7'; Sonali Mondal 10'		Nasimul Khatun; Sandhya Maiti	Stadium: Krishnanagar Ground

== Knockout stage ==
=== Bracket ===
Semifinals; 31 May 2023
1	East Bengal	3
4	West Bengal Police	0
3	Sreebhumi	5
2	Chandney SC	1

Final; 2 June 2023
East Bengal	5
Sreebhumi	0

=== Semi-final ===
The top two teams from both groups: East Bengal, Chandney SC, Sreebhumi and West Bengal Police qualified for the semi-finals.

Team 1	Score	Team 2
East Bengal	3–0	West Bengal Police
Sreebhumi	5–1	Chandney SC

==== Matches ====
31 May 2023 SF1	East Bengal	3–0	West Bengal Police	Tehatta
10:00 hrs IST	Tulsi Hembram 51', 90+3'; Mousumi Murmu 87'	Report		Stadium: Harichand Guruchand Krirangan; Attendance: 100; Referee: Akshay Kumar Haldar

31 May 2023 SF2	Sreebhumi	5–1	Chandney SC	Tehatta
15:30 hrs IST	Sujata Mahata 9', 16', 50'; Titli Sarkar 12', 24'	Report	Poonam Barla 31'	Stadium: Harichand Guruchand Krirangan; Attendance: 100; Referee: Abir Sarkar

=== Final ===
==== Summary ====
The inaugural 2023 Women's IFA Shield final was held at the Harichand Guruchand Krirangan, Tehatta on 2 June 2023 between East Bengal and Sreebhumi. East Bengal and Sreebhumi reached the final winning all the matches on their way, defeating West Bengal Police and Chandney SC in the semi-finals respectively. East Bengal, who were already the 2022–23 Kanyashree Cup champions, dominated the game from the beginning as they took a 2–0 lead within eighteen minutes with goals from Tulsi Hembram and Barnali Karar. Tulsi Hembram scored three more goals in the second half as East Bengal defeated Shreebhumi 5–0 to lift the inaugural Women's IFA Shield title.

==== Match ====
2 June 2023
15:30 IST

East Bengal	5–0	Sreebhumi
Tulsi Hembram 13', 47', 77', 82'; Barnali Karar 18'	Report

Harichand Guruchand Krirangan, Tehatta
Attendance: 1,500
Referee: Akshay Kumar Haldar

East Bengal	Sreebhumi

GK	41	Gurubari Mandi
RB	20	Trisha Mallick
CB	5	Ratna Halder
CB	27	Mamata Sing
LB	2	Anita Oraon
CM	7	Puja Karmakar	(substituted off) 65'
CM	11	Barnali Karar	(substituted off) 80'
CM	16	Sushmita Bardhan	(substituted off) 62'
LW	14	Rimpa Halder
CF	28	Tulsi Hembram
RW	21	Mousumi Murmu (c)
Substitutions:
GK	1	Rani Bhowmick
RB	4	Bandana Roy
CM	26	Sashwati Sarkar	(substituted on) 80'
CM	8	Kabita Saren	(substituted on) 62'
RW	29	Mamata Mahata
LW	22	Sulanjana Raul	(substituted on) 65'
CF	18	Tanushree Oraon
CM	9	Tamalika Sarkar
LB	3	Riya Sarkar
CM	6	Birsi Oraon
Head Coach:
Indrani Sarkar

GK	1	Rinki Oraon
RB	27	Atasi Pal (c)
CB	3	Jhanu Roy
CB	4	Mollika Tudu
LB	5	Mangali Murmu
CM	16	Jyoti Sharma	(substituted off) 52'
CM	7	Sathi Debnath	(substituted off) 52'
RW	9	Sarjida Khatun
LW	11	Deblina Bhattacharjee
CF	28	Sujata Mahata
LF	12	Chapa Mistry
Substitutions:
GK	41	Poushali Howladar
FW	8	Moumita Chakraborty
DF	36	Titli Sarkar
MF	29	Barnali Mahata	(substituted on) 52'
FW	21	Shyamali Baskey	(substituted on) 52'
MF	17	Anjali Soren
MF	15	Debarati Dey
FW	36	Asrafi Khatun
FW	18	Sonamoni Soren
FW	25	Arpita Paul
Head Coach:
Pratima Biswas

Player of the Match:
Tulsi Hembram (East Bengal)

Match rules

- 90 minutes.
- 30 minutes of extra time if necessary.
- Penalty shoot-out if scores still level.
- Ten named substitutes
- Maximum of five substitutions, with a sixth allowed in extra time.

== Statistics ==
As of 2 June 2023

=== Top goal scorers ===
Rank	Nat.	Player	Club	Goals
1	(India)	Tulsi Hembram	East Bengal	15
2	(India)	Mousumi Murmu	East Bengal	7
2	(India)	Tili Sarkar	Sreebhumi	7
4	(India)	Sujata Mahata	Sreebhumi	4
5	(India)	Sarjida Khatun	Sreebhumi	3
6	(India)	Sulanjana Raul	East Bengal	2
6	(India)	Kajali Deheri	Chandney SC	2
6	(India)	Poonam Barla	Chandney SC	2
6	(India)	Barnali Karar	East Bengal	2

== Season awards ==
The following awards were announced at the end of the tournament:

- Player of the Tournament: Tulsi Hembram (East Bengal)
- Highest Goalscorer: Tulsi Hembram (East Bengal) – 15 goals in 4 matches
