= Sujata Kar =

Indian football coach and former footballer

Personal information
- Date of birth: 13 May 1980 (age 46)
- Place of birth: Kolkata, West Bengal, India
- Position: Forward

Team information
- Current team: Sribhumi; Southern Samity (head coach)

Senior career*
Years	Team	Apps	(Gls)
2000–2001	East Bengal		

International career
1998–2007	India	?	(12)

Managerial career
- 2017: Taltala Dipti Sangha
- 2021: Southern Samity (assistant)
- 2021–2022: ARA (assistant)
- 2022: ARA (interim)
- 2022–2023: East Bengal
- 2022–2025: West Bengal (state)
- 2023–: Sribhumi
- 2025–: Southern Samity
- 2026–: India Women (assistant)
- * Club domestic league appearances and goals

Sujata Kar (born 13 May 1980) is an Indian football manager and former footballer. She serves as the head coach of the Indian Women's League club Sribhumi and the Calcutta Football League club Southern Samity. She also served as the head coach of the East Bengal side in their maiden appearance in the Indian Women's League season. She also represented and served as the captain of the India women's national football team in 2007.

== Early life ==
Kar grew up in the Jadavpur area of Kolkata.

== Career ==
In February 2000, she signed a contract with the German Bundesliga second division by TSV Crailsheim. She trained for two months in Germany along with Alpana Seal, but lack of proper documentation denied her a chance to play in the foreign league.

In 2001, she captained the East Bengal club team, which won the Kolkata Women's Football League.

As a coach, she guided Sribhumi to their Indian Women's League 2 title in 2024.

== International goals ==
No.	Date	Venue	Opponent	Score	Result	Competition
1.	9 November 1999	Iloilo Sports Complex, Iloilo City, Philippines	Malaysia	?–0	3–0	1999 AFC Women's Championship
2.	12 December 2001	Taipei Municipality Stadium, Taipei, Taiwan	Malaysia	1–0	3–0	2001 AFC Women's Championship
3.	12 December 2001	Taipei Municipality Stadium, Taipei, Taiwan	Malaysia	2–0	3–0	2001 AFC Women's Championship
4.	9 June 2003	Nakhon Sawan Stadium, Nakhon Sawan, Thailand	Uzbekistan	4–0	6–0	2003 AFC Women's Championship
5.	13 June 2003	Nakhon Sawan Stadium, Nakhon Sawan, Thailand	Vietnam	1–2	1–2	2003 AFC Women's Championship
6.	12 June 2005	Mỹ Đình National Stadium, Hanoi, Vietnam	Guam	2–0	10–0	2006 AFC Women's Asian Cup qualifiers
7.	12 June 2005	Mỹ Đình National Stadium, Hanoi, Vietnam	Guam	3–0	10–0	2006 AFC Women's Asian Cup qualifiers
8.	12 June 2005	Mỹ Đình National Stadium, Hanoi, Vietnam	Guam	8–0	10–0	2006 AFC Women's Asian Cup qualifiers
9.	12 June 2005	Mỹ Đình National Stadium, Hanoi, Vietnam	Guam	9–0	10–0	2006 AFC Women's Asian Cup qualifiers
10.	12 June 2005	Mỹ Đình National Stadium, Hanoi, Vietnam	Guam	10–0	10–0	2006 AFC Women's Asian Cup qualifiers
11.	20 June 2005	Mỹ Đình National Stadium, Hanoi, Vietnam	Thailand	1–0	2–3	2006 AFC Women's Asian Cup qualifiers
12.	20 June 2005	Mỹ Đình National Stadium, Hanoi, Vietnam	Thailand	2–0	2–3	2006 AFC Women's Asian Cup qualifiers

== Honours ==
=== Player ===
East Bengal

- Calcutta Women's Football League: 2001

=== Manager ===
Taltala Dipti Sangha

- Calcutta Women's Football League: 2017

East Bengal

- Calcutta Women's Football League: 2022–23

Sribhumi

- Indian Women's League 2: 2023–24
- Calcutta Women's Football League: 2023–24

== Awards ==
2024: Best women's coach of the year awarded by AIFF.
