= Shilky Devi Hemam =

Indian footballer (born 2005)

Shilky Devi
Personal information
- Full name: Shilky Devi Hemam
- Date of birth: 23 November 2005 (age 20)
- Place of birth: Moirang, Manipur, India
- Height: 1.67 m (5 ft 6 in)
- Positions: Midfielder; defender

Team information
- Current team: East Bengal
- Number: 19

Youth career
- SAI Academy Imphal

Senior career*
Years	Team	Apps	(Gls)
–2022	Gokulam Kerala		
2022–2023	The Young Welfare Club		
2023–2025	Gokulam Kerala	35	(5)
2025–	East Bengal	0	(0)

International career^{‡}
2019	India U17	4	(3)
2021–2023	India U20	17	(1)
2022–	India	34	(1)
- * Club domestic league appearances and goals as of 18 April 2025 ‡ National team caps and goals as of 6 June 2026

Shilky Devi Hemam (Meitei: Hemam Shilky Devi, born 23 November 2005) is an Indian professional footballer from Manipur, who plays as a midfielder or defender for East Bengal in the Indian Women's League and the India women's national football team.

== Early life ==
Shilky was born in Moirang, into a poor family. Her father, Suresh Hemam, was a cook and he used to encourage Hemam to play football but her mother, also a cook, was reluctant to let her play football elsewhere. Later, she accepted and Shilky was then sent to the SAI Academy, Imphal for training. Her brother Bijoyo used to play for a local club, AMOFA in Manipur. Bijoyo runs a small hotel which sells rice in Moirang.

== Career ==
Hemam made her Junior India debut at the age of 12 years in 2018 when she captained India to victory at the SAFF under-15 Women's Championship in Bhutan and became the joint top-scorer. The other tournaments she has played in are AFC U-16 Qualifiers in Mongolia in 2019 before she made here Senior India debut in 2022 against Brazil where India lost 1–5. In the other matches, they lost to Chile 0–3 on 29 November and to Venezuela 1–2 on 2 December 2021.

In the FIFA U-17 World Cup, she was part of the Indian team that played three matches in October 2022 against USA (lost 0–8), Morocco (lost 0–3) and Brazil (lost 0–5). In 2022, she also played the Asian Women's Cup in 2022 and was part of the India Under-17 team at the Women's World Cup where she was the captain.

In 2022, she was the youngest player of the AFC Women's Asia Cup aged 16 years and two months.

In March 2023, she also represented India U-20 women's team in Group F matches at the AFC U-20 Women's Asian Cup Qualifiers Round 1 at Viet Tri City, Indonesia.

== Career statistics ==
=== Club ===
As of match played 28 April 2023

Appearances and goals by club, season and competition
Club	Season	League			National Cup		League Cup		Continental		Total	
Club	Season	Division	Apps	Goals	Apps	Goals	Apps	Goals	Apps	Goals	Apps	Goals
Gokulam Kerala	2022–23	Indian Women's League	10	3	0	0	0	0	—		10	3
Gokulam Kerala	2023–24	Indian Women's League	11	0	0	0	0	0	3 (Note: Appearance(s) in 2023 AFC Women's Club Championship)	0	14	0
Gokulam Kerala	2024–25	Indian Women's League	14	2	0	0	0	0	0	0	14	2
Gokulam Kerala	Gokulam Kerala total		35	5	0	0	0	0	3	0	38	5
Career total			35	5	0	0	0	0	3	0	38	5

=== International ===
As of 6 June 2026

National team	Year	Caps	Goals
India	2021	2	0
India	2022	0	0
India	2023	7	1
India	2024	7	0
India	2025	11	0
India	2026	7	0
Total		34	1

Scores and results list India's goal tally first.

List of international goals scored by Hemam Shilky Devi
No.	Date	Venue	Opponent	Score	Result	Competition
1.	4 April 2023	Dolen Omurzakov Stadium, Bishkek, Kyrgyzstan	Kyrgyzstan	4–0	5–0	2024 Olympic Qualifiers

== Honours ==
India

- SAFF Women's Championship: 2026

East Bengal

- SAFF Women's Club Championship: 2025
- Indian Women's League: 2025–26

Gokulam Kerala

- Indian Women's League: 2022–23

Manipur

- Rajmata Jijabai Trophy: 2023–24

Individual

- Indian Women's League Best Defender: 2023–24
