= East Bengal FC (women) =

Women's football club in India

East Bengal
- Full name: East Bengal Football Club
- Nicknames: Lal Holud Brigade (The Red and Yellow Brigade); Moshal Bahini (The Torch Bearers); Bangal Brigade; Moshal Girls
- Short name: EBFC
- Founded: 1920; 106 years ago
- Ground: East Bengal Ground; Vivekananda Yuba Bharati Krirangan (selected matches)
- Capacity: 23,500; 85,000
- Owner: East Bengal Club
- President: Murari Lal Lohia
- Head coach: Anthony Andrews
- League: Indian Women's League; Calcutta Women's Football League
- Website: emamieastbengal.com
Home colours	Away colours

East Bengal Football Club, commonly referred to as East Bengal, is a professional women's football club based in Kolkata, West Bengal. It is the women's section of East Bengal FC. They compete in the Indian Women's League, the women's premier football league in India, having won the tournament twice. The club has also won the Calcutta Women's Football League (Kanyashree Cup) four times and the Women's IFA Shield once. They also won the inaugural SAFF Women's Club Championship in 2025.

== History ==
=== Formation and early beginnings ===
The East Bengal women's football team was formed in 2001 and in their inaugural season of the Calcutta Women's Football League, they lifted the title defeating arch-rivals Mohun Bagan 1–0 in the final at the Rabindra Sarobar Stadium with Shanta Dhara scoring the solitary goal for the club. The following season, East Bengal women's team reached the final again but lost in the final against Mohun Bagan after the game ended 1–1 in the regulation time and Mohun Bagan won 3–2 in the penalty shootout at the Sailen Manna Stadium in Howrah. The team was however disbanded after the season.

=== Relaunch and another halt ===
In their centenary year, the East Bengal club again decided to relaunch the women's team and participate in the Calcutta Women's Football League. They had appointed former India International Kuntala Ghosh Dastidar as the head coach of the team. In October, initial trials were conducted by the club under Kuntala Ghosh Dastidar, with over 150 women participating. On 27 December, IFA registration of 21 players was done for the Women's League that commenced in January 2020. The East Bengal Women's team started off their campaign in the 2020 Kanyashree Cup in style as they defeated Dipti Sangha by 6–1.

On 13 February East Bengal Women's team made history as they faced Biddyut Sporting. They led 18–0 within 30 minutes when the opposing team forfeited the game and the referee awarded it to East Bengal. On 6 March, the East Bengal Women's team surpassed their own record once again as they scored 20 goals against Bhangore SWF. East Bengal's forward Tulsi Hembram scored 8 goals and Mamata Hansda 4. The team qualified for the Super Six competition without losing a single game, and qualified for the Semi-Final where they faced Police AC. East Bengal won the semi-final 5–4 in the penalty shootout after the game had ended 1–1 in regulation time. However, the game was replayed due to issues with player registration and East Bengal team once again won the replayed match 5–4 in the penalties after the game ended goalless to reach the final. On 30 December 2020, East Bengal faced SSB Women's at the Salt Lake Stadium in the final of the Kanyashree Cup and finished runners up with a 2–0 loss, with a goal conceded in each half.

However, due to a tussle between the club officials and the investor group Shree Cement, the women's football team and all the players were released. It was informed that they would not be fielding a team for the 2021–22 Kanyashree Cup.

=== Comeback ===
In 2022, the East Bengal women's football team began the season by participating in the Kaliaganj MLA Cup held at Uttar Dinajpur and won the four-team tournament by defeating MLA Kaliaganj 1–0 in the final. On 18 December, they announced the squad for the 2022–23 Kanyashree Cup. East Bengal started their campaign with a 2–0 win against WB Police on 20 December at the Rabindra Sarobar Stadium, with Sulanjana Raul and Kabita Saren scoring for the team. On 10 January 2023, in their fourth match of the season, East Bengal defeated Behala Aikya Sammilani by 35–0, creating a record as the biggest win by an Indian team in any women's football game conducted by AIFF. Mousumi Murmu and Kabita Saren scored six goals each, Deblina Bhattacharjee and Gita Das scored five each, Sushmita Bardhan scored four, Aishwarya Arun Jagtap scored thrice, Sulanjana Raul and Tanushree Oraon scored a brace while Birsi Oraon and Piyali Kora scored one each. On 19 January, East Bengal defeated Adivasi United Students Club 3–0 in the last match of the group stages to enter the knockouts. They finished top of the group with seven wins, including two walkovers given by Dipti Sangha and Kolkata Union Sporting Club, having scored fifty-eight goals without conceding a single. On 23 January, East Bengal faced New Alipore Suruchi Sangha in the quarter-finals and won 2–1 with goals from Mousumi Murmu and Sulanjana Raul. On 25 January, East Bengal defeated Mohammedan Sporting 3–0 in the semi-finals at the Kishore Bharati Krirangan. Rimpa Halder scored a brace while Nimita Gurung of Mohammedan scored an own goal as East Bengal reached the final of the 2022–23 Kanyashree Cup. On 28 January, East Bengal faced Sreebhumi in the final of the Kanyashree Cup at the Kishore Bharati Krirangan and won 1–0 courtesy of a solitary goal from 15 year old Sulanjana Raul as East Bengal became the champions for the second time after 2001 and qualified for the Indian Women's League.

=== Indian Women's League, Women's IFA Shield ===
East Bengal women's football team qualified for the Indian Women's League for the first time after becoming the champions of the 2022–23 Kanyashree Cup. They were grouped alongside the defending champions Gokulam Kerala in Group A along with six more teams, with top four from each group qualifying for the knockout stages and be eligible for direct qualification to the next season, irrespective of their results in the state leagues. On 22 April, the club announced the squad for the Indian Women's League campaign, with eleven names from the Kanyashree Cup championship team. On 26 April, East Bengal made their debut in the Indian Women's League against defending champions Gokulam Kerala and suffered an 8–2 defeat at the TransStadia in Ahmedabad with Rimpa Haldar and Tulsi Hembram scoring for East Bengal. On 29 April, East Bengal women's team earned their first ever victory in the Indian Women's League as the defeated Kahaani 1–0 at the Shahibaug Police Stadium with captain Ratna Haldar scoring the only goal for East Bengal. On 2 May, East Bengal registered their second win as they defeated Mata Rakmani FC 2–0 with goals from Mousumi Murmu and Rimpa Haldar. On 4 May, East Bengal grabbed their third win in succession as they defeated Mumbai Knights 4–2 with Rimpa Haldar scoring twice and Tulsi Hembram and Mousumi Murmu scoring the other for the team. On 12 May, East Bengal defeated HOPS 1–0 in the last match of the group stage courtesy of a solitary strike from captain Ratna Halder as they secured a top four finish and ensured a place in the knockouts in their maiden appearance and also earned an automatic qualification for the 2023–24 Indian Women's League. On 16 May, East Bengal faced former champions Sethu in the quarter-finals of the IWL and were eliminated after the game ended 9–0 for Sethu, thus ending the campaign for East Bengal in their inaugural season in the Indian Women's League.

After the Indian Women's League, East Bengal Women's team participated in the inaugural Women's IFA Shield held at Tehatta, Nadia, West Bengal and emerged victorious defeating Sreebhumi 5–0 in the final on 2 June 2023. East Bengal won all four matches in the tournament, scoring twenty-seven goals in them and conceding none as they lifted the inaugural title. Tulsi Hembram was adjudged the player of the tournament after becoming the top scorer with fifteen goals in four matches.

In the 2023–24 season, East Bengal failed to retain the Kanyashree Cup as they became runner-up to Sreebhumi. In January 2024, East Bengal women's team signed their first ever foreign player as they roped in Bangladesh women's national football team winger Sanjida Akhter to play in the 2023–24 Indian Women's League. East Bengal finished sixth in the 2023–24 Indian Women's League.

=== Maiden Indian Women's League Title ===
After spending two seasons in the IWL, the East Bengal team management made efforts to build a strong squad for the 2024–25 season, and roped in India women's national football team players: Sandhiya Ranganathan, Soumya Guguloth, Loitongbam Ashalata Devi, Ngangbam Sweety Devi, Anju Tamang, Karthika Angamuthu, Elangbam Panthoi Chanu and Naorem Priyangka Devi, along with three foreign players: Elshaddai Acheampong of Ghana, Resty Nanziri of Uganda and Maurine Achieng of Kenya. East Bengal also roped in the two-time IWL-winning coach Anthony Andrews from Gokulam Kerala by paying a record transfer fee in women's football in India. The result bore fruit as on 11 April 2025, East Bengal clinched their maiden Indian Women's League title with a game to spear after defeating Odisha 1–0 at the Kalyani Stadium. East Bengal, with the championship, also qualified for the preliminary round of the 2025–26 AFC Women's Champions League. The team also completed a famous double winning the 2024–25 Calcutta Women's Football League defeating Sribhumi in the final.

=== Participation in AFC Women's Champions League and a Historic Treble Winning Season ===
East Bengal qualified for the 2025–26 AFC Women's Champions League after being the champions of the 2024–25 Indian Women's League. East Bengal was grouped into Group-E of the Preliminary round alongside Kitchee of Hong Kong and Phnom Penh Crown of Cambodia, with all the matches of the group set to be played at the RSN Stadium in Phnom Penh, Cambodia. In the opening match against Phnom Penh Crown on 25 August, East Bengal won 1–0 to begin the campaign with Fazila Ikwaput scoring the only goal of the match. On 31 August, East Bengal faced Kitchee and drew 1–1 and topped the group and secured a qualification for the group stages of the AFC Women's Champions League. East Bengal was grouped into Group-B alongside hosts Wuhan Jiangda of China, Bam Khatoon from Iran and Nasaf from Uzbekistan, with all the matches to be played at the Hankou Cultural Sports Centre in Wuhan, China. On 17 November 2025, East Bengal faced Bam Khatoon in the opening match of the group stage and won 3–1 with goals from Shilky Devi Hemam, Fazila Ikwaput and Resty Nanziri to register their first ever win in the AWCL group stages. However, East Bengal lost in the next two matches against defending champions and hosts Wuhan Jiangda and Nasaf to get eliminated from the tournament with an inferior goal difference, finishing just below the best two third placed side, thus ending their inaugural journey in the AFC Women's Champions League.

East Bengal also participated in the inaugural SAFF Club Women's Championship as the sole representative from India after becoming champions of the 2024–25 Indian Women's League. The tournament consists of teams from hosts Nepal, Bangladesh, Pakistan and Bhutan, alongside East Bengal with all the matches to be played at the Dasharath Rangasala in Kathmandu. On 8 December, East Bengal debuted in the tournament with a 4–0 victory over Transport United of Bhutan with Fazila Ikwaput scoring a brace and Sulanjana Raul and Resty Nanziri scoring the rest.On 20 December 2025, East Bengal created history to become the first Indian women's football team to win an international tournament as they defeated APF of Nepal 3–0 in the final with Fazila Ikwaput scoring a brace and Shilky Devi Hemam scoring the other, as East Bengal became the inaugural champions of the SAFF Club Women's Championship.

East Bengal also went on to defend their Indian Women's League title with three matches to spare, thus winning their second title in consecutive seasons. On 21 May, East Bengal clinched a historic treble after winning the Kanyashree Cup as well, making it three trophies for the season.

=== Creating History on the Continental Stage ===
East Bengal playing against Hwacheon KSPO during 2026–27 AWCL at Kishore Bharati.

After winning the 2025–26 Indian Women's League, East Bengal once again earned a spot in the 2026–27 AFC Women's Champions League preliminary group stage. East Bengal was grouped into group A of the Preliminary round alongside hosts Sabah of Malaysia, Rovers of Guam and Rajshahi Stars of Bangladesh, with all the matches of the group set to be played at the Likas Stadium in Sabah, Malaysia. East Bengal won all the three matches, scoring eighteen goals without conceding a single goal, to win the group and become the first Indian team to qualify for the group stages of the AFC Women's Champions League in back-to-back seasons.

East Bengal got chosen as one of the hosts for the group stage, being the first even Indian club to host a group stage for the AFC Women's Champions League. On 3 September, the draw for the group stage took place and East Bengal was grouped alongside Hwacheon KSPO of South Korea, Ho Chi Minh City of Vietnam and April 25 of North Korea in the Group B, with all the matches to be played in Kolkata, India. East Bengal defeated the Vietnamese champions Ho Chi Minh City at the Kishore Bharati Krirangan and won 2–1 with Ugandan forward Fazila Ikwaput scoring a brace for the team. On 7 November, East Bengal faced April 25 of North Korea and even though they suffered a 2–0 defeat, the Moshal Girls created history to become the first even Indian women's team to qualify for the knockout stages of the AFC Women's Champions League, with a better goal difference to finish as one of the best third placed teams, and entered the last eight stage in Asia.

== Stadium ==
The East Bengal Ground is located in Kolkata, and is the home ground of the club. The stadium lies on the Maidan (Kolkata) area on the northern side of Fort William and near the Eden Gardens. This stadium is also used mostly for Calcutta Football League and academy players.

East Bengal Ground
Capacity: 23,500
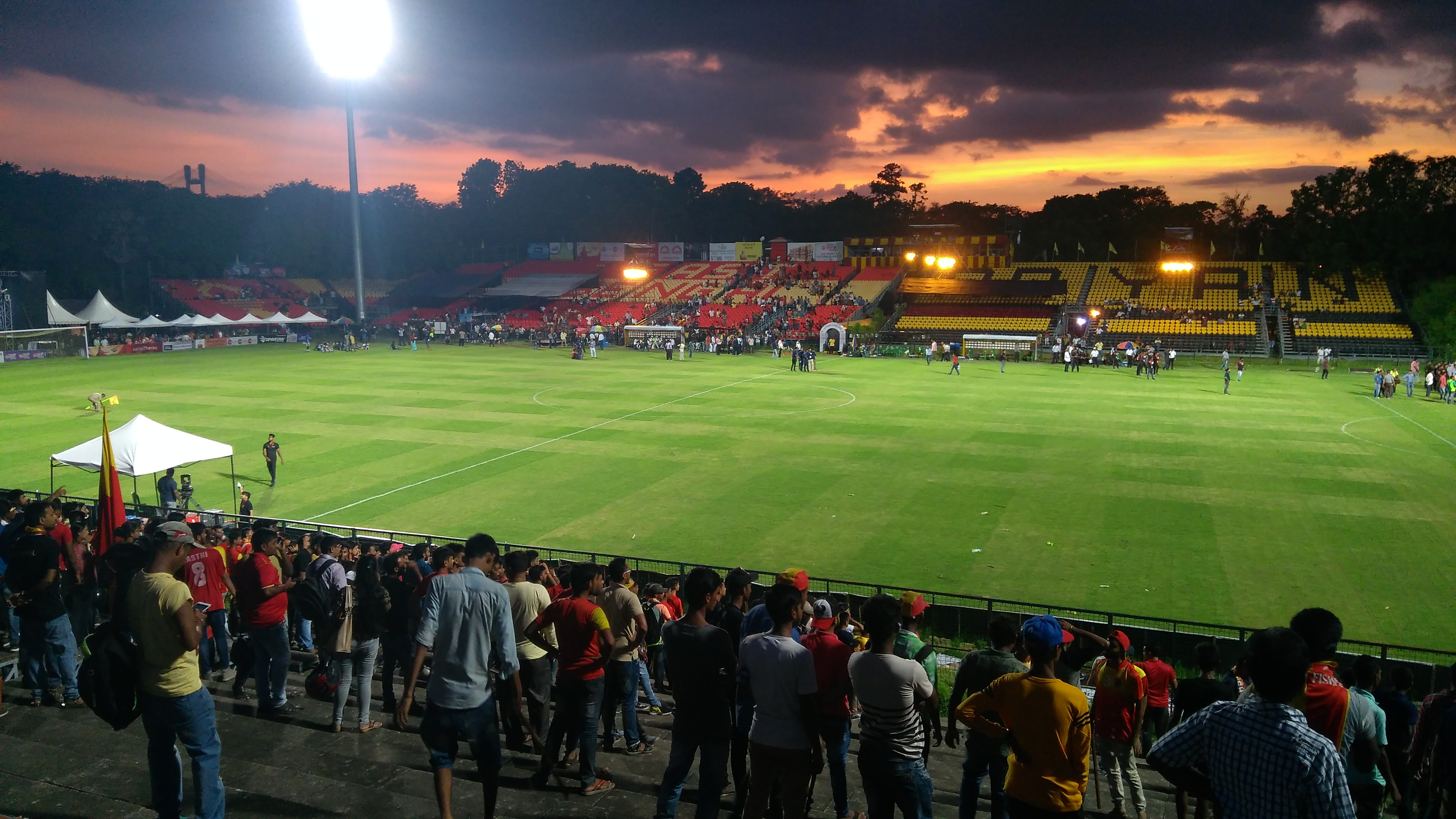

== Current squad ==
As of 1 November 2026

Note: Flags indicate national team as defined under FIFA eligibility rules; some limited exceptions apply. Players may hold more than one non-FIFA nationality.

No.	Pos.	Nation	Player
1	GK	IND	Panthoi Chanu Elangbam
2	MF	JPN	Hitomi Tanaka
4	DF	IND	Ashalata Devi Loitongbam
5	DF	IND	Astam Oraon
6	DF	IND	Sarita Yumnam
7	MF	IND	Soumya Guguloth
8	FW	IND	Sandhya Maity
10	FW	UGA	Fazila Ikwaput
11	MF	IND	Priyangka Devi Naorem
14	DF	IND	Thoibisana Chanu Toijam
15	MF	IND	Sushmita Lepcha
16	FW	UGA	Resty Nanziri
17	MF	IND	Sathi Debnath
18	MF	IND	Deblina Bhattacharjee
19	DF	IND	Shilky Devi Hemam (captain)
21	DF	GHA	Abena Anoma Opoku
22	FW	IND	Sulanjana Raul
23	DF	IND	Supriya Kispotta

No.	Pos.	Nation	Player
24	FW	IND	Pritika Barman
25	FW	IND	Shrabani Murmu
26	MF	IND	Riya Duley
28	FW	GHA	Abigail Antwi
30	GK	IND	Khambi Chanu Sarangthem
32	MF	IND	Rubina Khatun
34	DF	IND	Bandana Roy
44	MF	IND	Birsi Oraon
50	MF	IND	Anju Chanu Kayenpaibam
65	GK	IND	Mamani Das
67	FW	IND	Rimpa Haldar
71	GK	IND	Pratima Bagdi
77	DF	GHA	Adama Alhassan
80	MF	GHA	Olivia Anokye
91	GK	IND	Sikha Saren

== Current technical staff ==
As of August 2025

Position	Name
Head coach	(India) Anthony Andrews
Assistant coach	(India) Pratima Biswas
Goalkeeping coach	(India) Gowtham Ganesan
Strength and conditioning coach	(India) Aarav Kumar
Team manager	(India) Moumi Paul
Physiotherapist	(India) Srushti Patil
Masseur	(India) Kakali Dalal
Kit Manager	(India) Ashik Sarkar

== Records and statistics ==
=== Firsts ===
- First match in Calcutta Women's Football League: East Bengal 7–0 Bidyut Sports, 13 February 2001 (During the 2001 season).
- First match in Indian Women's League: East Bengal 2–8 Gokulam Kerala, 26 April 2023 (During the 2022–23 season).
- First match in Women's IFA Shield: East Bengal 8–0 Nadia DSA, 25 May 2023 (During the 2023 season).
- First match in AFC Women's Champions League: Phnom Penh Crown 0–1 East Bengal, 25 August 2025 (During the 2025–26 season, Preliminary round).
- First match in SAFF Women's Club Championship: Transport United 0–4 East Bengal, 8 December 2025 (During the 2025 season).
- First goal in Indian Women's League: Rimpa Haldar (against Gokulam Kerala, 26 April 2023).
- First goal in Women's IFA Shield: Tulsi Hembram (against Nadia DSA, 25 May 2023).
- First goal in AFC Women's Champions League: Fazila Ikwaput (against Phnom Penh Crown, 25 August 2025).
- First goal in SAFF Women's Club Championship: Fazila Ikwaput (against Transport United, 8 December 2025).
- First win in Indian Women's League: East Bengal 1–0 Kahaani, 29 April 2023 (During the 2022–23 season).
- First hat-trick in Indian Women's League: Elshaddai Acheampong (against Odisha, 9 March 2025, 2024–25).
- First hat-trick in SAFF Women's Club Championship: Fazila Ikwaput (against Nasrin, 14 December 2025, 2025).

=== Records ===
- Biggest win: East Bengal 35–0 Behala Aikya Sammilani, 10 January 2023 (During the 2022–23 Kanyashree Cup season).
- Biggest win in Indian Women's League: East Bengal 9–0 Sesa, 30 December 2025 (During the 2025–26 season).
- Biggest win in Women's IFA Shield: East Bengal 11–0 Chandney, 29 May 2023 (During the 2023 season).
- Biggest win in AFC Women's Champions League: East Bengal 12–0 Rovers, 20 August 2026 (During the 2025–26 season).
- Biggest win in SAFF Women's Club Championship: East Bengal 7–0 Nasrin, 14 December 2025 (During the 2025 season).
- Longest winning streak in Indian Women's League: 8 matches (During the 2024–25 continuing into the 2025–26 season).
- Longest winning streak in Kanyashree Cup: 12 matches (During the 2022–23 season into the 2023–24 season).
- Most goals in a match: 8 goals, Tulsi Hembram (against Bhangore SWF, 6 March 2020, 2020–21 Kanyashree Cup).
- Most goals in a Women's IFA Shield match: 6 goals, Tulsi Hembram (against Chandney, 29 May 2023, 2023 Women's IFA Shield).
- Most goals in an Indian Women's League match: 4 goals, Fazila Ikwaput (against Sesa, 30 December 2025, 2025–26).
- Most goals against an International opponent: 5 goals, Fazila Ikwaput (against Nasrin, 14 December 2025, 2025 SAFF Women's Club Championship).
- Most number of hat-tricks in Indian Women's League: 2, Fazila Ikwaput.
- Most individual scorers in an Indian Women's League match: 6 (against HOPS, during the 2024–25 season).
- Most individual scorers in an AFC Women's Champions League match: 9 (against Rovers, during the 2025–26 season).

=== League history ===
Season	International		Domestic		
Season	AFC WCL	SAFF WCC	IWL	Kanyashree Cup (Note: Calcutta Women's Football League also referred to as Kanyashree Cup since 2020)	IFA Shield
2001	—	—	—	**Winners**	—
2002	—	—	—	Runner-up	—
2003–2019	Team disbanded				
2020–21	—	—	did not qualify	Runner-up	—
2021–22	Team did not participate				
2022–23	—	—	Quarter-finals	**Winners**	**Winners**
2023–24	—	—	6th	Runner-up	—
2024–25	did not qualify	—	**Winners**	**Winners**	—
2025–26	Group stage	**Winners**	**Winners**	**Winners**	—
2026–27	Quarter-finals	2nd	to be decided	to be decided	—

=== All Time Top Scorer ===
List of all-time top scorers for East Bengal women's team in competitive fixtures.

Player names in bold are part of the current squad.
As of 13 November 2026

**All-time Top Scorer for East Bengal in competitive fixtures**
Ranking	Nationality	Name	Indian Women's League	Kanyashree Cup (Note: Post 2020, No data for previous editions.)	Women's IFA Shield	AFC Women's Champions League	SAFF Women's Club Championship	Total
1	(India)	**Sulanjana Raul**	11	46	2	1	3	63
2	(India)	Tulsi Hembram	2	29	15	—	—	46
3	(Uganda)	**Fazila Ikwaput**	21	0	0	5	9	35
4	(India)	Mousumi Murmu	3	12	7	—	—	22
4	(India)	**Sandhya Maity**	0	22	—	0	0	22
4	(India)	**Astam Oraon**	1	19	—	2	0	22
4	(India)	**Soumya Guguloth**	19	—	—	3	0	22

=== Overall record in Indian Women's League ===
As of 13 November 2026

**East Bengal Women's Team overall record in Indian Women's League**
Season	P	W	D	L	GF	GA	GD	Win %	Final position	Top Scorer	Goals
2022–23	8	4	1	3	12	22	−10	50.00	**Quarter-final**	(India) Rimpa Haldar	4
2023–24	12	1	1	10	8	31	−23	8.33	**6th**	(India) Sulanjana Raul	3
2024–25	14	12	1	1	38	10	+28	85.71	**Champions**	(Ghana) Elshaddai Acheampong	10
2025–26	14	13	0	1	47	5	+42	92.86	**Champions**	(Uganda) Fazila Ikwaput	20
2026–27	1	1	0	0	1	0	+1	100.00	2nd	(Uganda) Fazila Ikwaput	1
Overall	**49**	**31**	**3**	**15**	**106**	**68**	**+38**	**63.27**			

=== Top scorers in Indian Women's League ===
List of top scorers for East Bengal in the Indian Women's League.

Player names in bold are part of the current squad.
As of 13 November 2026

**Top Scorer for East Bengal in Indian Women's League**
Ranking	Nationality	Name	Goals
1	Uganda	**Fazila Ikwaput**	**21**
2	India	**Soumya Guguloth**	**19**
3	Uganda	**Resty Nanziri**	**11**
4	India	**Sulanjana Raul**	**11**
5	Ghana	Elshaddai Acheampong	**10**

==== Hat-tricks in Indian Women's League ====
List of all hat-tricks by an East Bengal player in the Indian Women's League:

Hat-tricks in Indian Women's League
Season	Date	Nationality	Name	Against	Final score	Ref
2024–25	9 March 2025	Ghana	Elshaddai Acheampong	Odisha	1 – **3**	
2025–26	30 December 2025	Uganda	Fazila Ikwaput	Sesa	**9** – 0	
2025–26	30 December 2025	India	Soumya Guguloth	Sesa	**9** – 0	
2025–26	27 April 2026	Uganda	Fazila Ikwaput	Sribhumi	**3** – 1	

=== Overall record in Kanyashree Cup ===
As of 21 May 2026

**East Bengal Women's Team overall record in Kanyashree Cup**
Season	P	W	D	L	GF	GA	GD	Win %	Final position	Top Scorer	Goals
2020–21	9	6	2	1	51	6	+45	66.67	Runners-up	(India) Tulsi Hembram	16
2021–22	did not participate										
2022–23	10	10	0	0	70	1	+69	100.00	Champions	(India) Mousumi Murmu	12
2023–24	12	9	2	1	55	5	+50	75.00	Runners-up	(India) Sulanjana Raul	17
2024–25	9	7	1	1	45	7	+38	77.78	Champions	(India) Karthika Angamuthu	7
2025–26	11	11	0	0	96	2	+94	100.00	Champions	(India) Sandhya Maity	14
Total	**51**	**43**	**5**	**3**	**317**	**21**	**+296**	**84.31**			

=== Top scorers in Kanyashree Cup ===
List of top scorers for East Bengal in the Kanyashree Cup (Note: Post 2020, after the rebranding of the Calcutta Women's Football League. No data for previous editions.)

Player names in bold are part of the current squad.
As of 21 May 2026

**Top Scorer for East Bengal in Kanyashree Cup**
Ranking	Nationality	Name	Goals
1	India	**Sulanjana Raul**	**46**
2	India	Tulsi Hembram	**29**
3	India	**Sandhya Maity**	**22**
4	India	**Astam Oraon**	**19**
5	India	Mousumi Murmu	**12**

== Club captains ==
List of East Bengal Women's captains since its establishment in 2001.

Name	Period
(India) Sujata Kar	2001
(India) Sunita Sarkar	2020–2021
(India) Mina Khatun	2022
(India) Ratna Halder	2023
(India) Mousumi Murmu	2023
(India) Trisha Mallick	2023–2024
(India) Sweety Devi Ngangbam	2025
(Uganda) Fazila Ikwaput	2025–2026
(India) Shilky Devi Hemam	2026–

== Coaching history ==
List of East Bengal Women's head coaches.

Dates	Name	Ref
2001–2002	Indrani Sarkar	
2020–2021	Kuntala Ghosh Dastidar	
2022–2023	Sujata Kar	
2023	Indrani Sarkar	
2023–2024	Dipankar Biswas	
2024–	Anthony Andrews	

== Honours ==
=== International ===
- SAFF Women's Club Championship
  - Champions (1): 2025

=== Domestic ===
- Indian Women's League
  - Champions (2): 2024–25, 2025–26
- Calcutta Football League (Kanyashree Cup)
  - Champions (4): 2001, 2022–23, 2024–25, 2025–26
  - Runners-up (3): 2002, 2019–20, 2023–24
- Women's IFA Shield
  - Champions (1): 2023

=== Regional ===
- Kaliaganj MLA Cup
  - Champions (1): 2022
- Baranagar MLA Cup
  - Champions (1): 2023

=== Recognitions ===
- IWL Roll of Honours
  - Best Media Activities (1): 2024–25

== Continental record ==
Season	Competition	Round	Club	Result	Position	Top scorer(s)	Goals
2025–26	AWCL	Preliminary Stage	(Cambodia) Phnom Penh Crown	1–0	1st in Group E	(Uganda) Fazila Ikwaput	2
2025–26	AWCL	Preliminary Stage	(Hong Kong) Kitchee	1–1	1st in Group E	(Uganda) Fazila Ikwaput	2
2025–26	AWCL	Group Stage	(Iran) Bam Khatoon	3–1	3rd in Group B	(Uganda) Fazila Ikwaput	2
2025–26	AWCL	Group Stage	(China) Wuhan Jiangda	0–2	3rd in Group B	(Uganda) Fazila Ikwaput	2
2025–26	AWCL	Group Stage	(Uzbekistan) Nasaf	0–3	3rd in Group B	(Uganda) Fazila Ikwaput	2
2025–26	SWCC	Group Stage	(Bhutan) Transport United	4–0	1st in Group stage	(Uganda) Fazila Ikwaput	9
2025–26	SWCC	Group Stage	(Pakistan) Karachi City	2–0	1st in Group stage	(Uganda) Fazila Ikwaput	9
2025–26	SWCC	Group Stage	(Bangladesh) Nasrin	7–0	1st in Group stage	(Uganda) Fazila Ikwaput	9
2025–26	SWCC	Group Stage	(Nepal) APF	0–0	1st in Group stage	(Uganda) Fazila Ikwaput	9
2025–26	SWCC	Final	(Nepal) APF	3–0	Champions	(Uganda) Fazila Ikwaput	9
2026–27	AWCL	Preliminary Stage	(Bangladesh) Rajshahi Stars	4–0	1st in Group A	(Ghana) Olivia Anokye	5
2026–27	AWCL	Preliminary Stage	(Guam) Rovers	12–0	1st in Group A	(Ghana) Olivia Anokye	5
2026–27	AWCL	Preliminary Stage	(Malaysia) Sabah	2–0	1st in Group A	(Ghana) Olivia Anokye	5
2026–27	AWCL	Group Stage	(Vietnam) Hồ Chí Minh City	2–1	3rd in Group B	(Ghana) Olivia Anokye	5
2026–27	AWCL	Group Stage	(South Korea) Hwacheon KSPO	1–4	3rd in Group B	(Ghana) Olivia Anokye	5
2026–27	AWCL	Group Stage	(North Korea) April 25	0–2	3rd in Group B	(Ghana) Olivia Anokye	5
2026–27	AWCL	Quarter-Final	to be decided	–	—N/a	(Ghana) Olivia Anokye	5

== List of foreign players ==
Key

- A player name in **bold** signifies they have been capped by the national team.

As of 21 September 2026

Each player is mentioned only once, if some of them have rejoined the club later again in different seasons, those entries are excluded from the list.

No.	Season joined	Nationality	Name	Position	Ref.
1	2023–24	Bangladesh	**Sanjida Akhter**	MF	
2	2024–25	Uganda	**Resty Nanziri**	FW	
3	2024–25	Ghana	**Elshaddai Acheampong**	FW	
4	2024–25	Kenya	**Maurine Achieng**	MF	
5	2025–26	Uganda	**Fazila Ikwaput**	FW	
6	2025–26	Uganda	**Amnah Nababi**	MF	
7	2025–26	Ghana	**Abena Anoma Opoku**	DF	
8	2025–26	Nigeria	**Maureen Tovia Okpala**	DF	
9	2026–27	Ghana	**Adama Alhassan**	DF	
10	2026–27	Ghana	**Olivia Anokye**	FW	
11	2026–27	Ghana	**Abigail Antwi**	FW	
12	2026–27	Japan	Hitomi Tanaka	DF	
