= 2025 SAFF Women's Club Championship =

Association football tournament in South Asia

Tournament details
- Host country: Nepal
- City: Kathmandu
- Dates: 5 – 20 December
- Teams: 5 (from 5 associations)
- Venue: 1

Final positions
- Champions: (India) East Bengal (1st title)
- Runners-up: (Nepal) APF

Tournament statistics
- Matches played: 11
- Goals scored: 23 (2.09 per match)
- Attendance: 27,607 (2,510 per match)
- Top scorer(s): (Uganda) Fazila Ikwaput (East Bengal) (9 goals)
- Best player: (Uganda) Fazila Ikwaput
- Best goalkeeper: (India) Panthoi Chanu Elangbam
- Fair play award: (Bhutan Football Federation) Transport United

The 2025 SAFF Women's Club Championship, known as the Vatsalya SAFF Women's Club Championship Nepal 2025 due to sponsorship reasons, was the inaugural edition of the SAFF Women's Club Championship, an international women's club football competition featuring leading clubs from South Asia. It was organised by the South Asian Football Federation (SAFF). Five teams from the region competed in Kathmandu from 5 to 20 December 2025.

== Association team allocation ==
Ranking for AFC Women's Club Competitions are calculated with 70% of AFC club points and 30% of national team points as per FIFA rankings.

SAFF Women's Club Championship
| Participating |
| Not participating |

| Rank | | Member association | Points | Slots |
| SAFF | AFC | Member association | Points | Slots |
|---|---|---|---|---|
| 1 | 11 | India | 30.737 | 1 |
| 2 | 19 | Nepal | 19.831 | 1 |
| 3 | 28 | Bangladesh | 16.362 | 1 |
| 4 | 33 | Bhutan | 14.382 | 1 |
| 5 | 34 | Pakistan | 14.241 | 1 |
| 6 | 35 | Sri Lanka | 14.228 | — |
| 7 | 38 | Maldives | 13.837 | — |
| Total | | Participating associations: 5 | | 5 |

== Teams ==
Locations of SAFF Women's Club Championship teams

The following teams was participated in the tournament.

Participants
| Team | Qualifying method | Result |
|---|---|---|
| (India) East Bengal | 2024–25 Indian Women's League | Champions |
| (Nepal) APF | 2024 ANFA Women's League | Champions |
| (Bangladesh Football Federation) Nasrin | 2023–24 Bangladesh Women's Football League | Champions |
| (Bhutan) Transport United | 2024 Bhutan Women's National League | Runners-up |
| (Pakistan) Karachi City | 2024 National Women Football Championship | Champions |

== Venue ==
The tournament was played at Dasharath Rangasala, Kathmandu.

Kathmandu
Dasharath Rangasala
Capacity: 15,000
| Kathmandu is located in Nepal |

== Schedule ==
| Stage | Round | Dates |
|---|---|---|
| Group stage | Matchday 1 | 5 December |
| Group stage | Matchday 2 | 8 December |
| Group stage | Matchday 3 | 11 December |
| Group stage | Matchday 4 | 14 December |
| Group stage | Matchday 5 | 17 December |
| Final match | | 20 December |

== Match officials ==
The following officials were chosen for the competition by SAFF tournament committee.

Referees

- (India) Ranjita Devi Tekcham
- (Laos) Keomany Phengmeuagkhoun
- (Myanmar) Zin Mar Oo
- (Nepal) Anjana Rai
- (Sri Lanka) Yapa A Pabasara Minisarani

Assistant Referees

- (Bangladesh) Salma Akter Moni
- (Bhutan) Tshering Choden
- (India) Riiohlang Dhar
- (Iran) Atena Lashani
- (Iran) Reihaneh Shirazi
- (Laos) Phutsavan Chanthavong
- (Lebanon) Jana Haydar
- (Nepal) Merina Dhimal
- (Sri Lanka) HM Malika Madushani

Match Commissioners

- (Bangladesh) Subha Rahman
- (Bhutan) Mindu Dorji
- (India) Khamba Singh Haobam

Referee Accessors

- (India) Maria Rebello

== League stage ==
=== Tiebreakers ===
Tiebreakers
1. Points in head-to-head matches among tied teams;
2. Goal difference in head-to-head matches among tied teams;
3. Goals scored in head-to-head matches among tied teams;
4. If more than two teams are tied, and after applying all head-to-head criteria above, a subset of teams are still tied, all head-to-head criteria above are reapplied exclusively to this subset of teams;
5. Goal difference in all group matches;
6. Goals scored in all group matches;
7. Penalty shoot-out if only two teams are tied and they met in the last round of the group;
8. Disciplinary points (yellow card = 1 point, red card as a result of two yellow cards = 3 points, direct red card = 3 points, yellow card followed by direct red card = 4 points);
9. Drawing of lots.

=== Standings ===
| Pos | Team | Pld | W | D | L | GF | GA | GD | Pts | Qualification | (India) EAB | (Nepal) APF | (Bhutan) TRU | (Pakistan) KAC | (Bangladesh) NAS |
|---|---|---|---|---|---|---|---|---|---|---|---|---|---|---|---|
| 1 | (India) East Bengal (C) | 4 | 3 | 1 | 0 | 13 | 0 | +13 | 10 | Advance to final | | 0–0 | | 2–0 | |
| 2 | (Nepal) APF (H) | 4 | 2 | 2 | 0 | 5 | 0 | +5 | 8 | Advance to final | | | 0–0 | 1–0 | |
| 3 | (Bhutan) Transport United | 4 | 0 | 3 | 1 | 1 | 5 | −4 | 3 | | 0–4 | | | | 1–1 |
| 4 | (Pakistan) Karachi City | 4 | 0 | 2 | 2 | 0 | 3 | −3 | 2 | | | | 0–0 | | 0–0 |
| 5 | (Bangladesh) Nasrin | 4 | 0 | 2 | 2 | 1 | 12 | −11 | 2 | | 0–7 | 0–4 | | | |

Source: SAFF
Legend: Blue = home team win; Yellow = draw; Red = away team win.
Rules for classification: Qualification tiebreakers
(C) Champions; (H) Hosts

=== Matches ===
5 December 2025
14:00
Match 1

| Karachi City (Pakistan Football Federation) | 0–0 | (Bhutan Football Federation) Transport United |
|---|---|---|
| | Report |

Dasharath Rangasala, Kathmandu
Attendance: 262
Referee: Anjana Rai (Nepal)
Player of the Match: Zeeyana Jivraj (Karachi City)

5 December 2025
18:00
Match 2

| Nasrin (Bangladesh Football Federation) | 0–4 | (All Nepal Football Association) APF |
|---|---|---|
| | Report | Ghising 38', 80'; Deuba 70', 90+2' |

Dasharath Rangasala, Kathmandu
Attendance: 3,523
Referee: Keomany Phengmeuagkhoun (Laos)
Player of the Match: Rashmi Ghising (APF)

8 December 2025
14:00
Match 3

| Transport United (Bhutan Football Federation) | 0–4 | (All India Football Federation) East Bengal |
|---|---|---|
| | Report | Ikwaput 35', 72'; Raul 59'; Nanziri 64' |

Dasharath Rangasala, Kathmandu
Attendance: 125
Referee: Zin Mar Oo (Myanmar)
Player of the Match: Fazila Ikwaput (East Bengal)

8 December 2025
18:00
Match 4

| Karachi City (Pakistan Football Federation) | 0–0 | (Bangladesh Football Federation) Nasrin |
|---|---|---|
| | Report |

Dasharath Rangasala, Kathmandu
Attendance: 211
Referee: Yapa A Pabasara Minisarani (Sri Lanka)
Player of the Match: Maria Khan (Karachi City)

11 December 2025
14:00
Match 5

| East Bengal (All India Football Federation) | 2–0 | (Pakistan Football Federation) Karachi City |
|---|---|---|
| Raul 5'; Nanziri 49' | Report |

Dasharath Rangasala, Kathmandu
Attendance: 305
Referee: Anjana Rai (Nepal)
Player of the Match: Sulanjana Raul (East Bengal)

11 December 2025
18:00
Match 6

| APF (All Nepal Football Association) | 0–0 | (Bhutan Football Federation) Transport United |
|---|---|---|
| | Report |

Dasharath Rangasala, Kathmandu
Attendance: 4,703
Referee: Ranjita Devi Tekcham (India)
Player of the Match: Sangita Monger (Transport United)

14 December 2025
14:00
Match 7

| APF (All Nepal Football Association) | 1–0 | (Pakistan Football Federation) Karachi City |
|---|---|---|
| Ghising 52' | Report |

Dasharath Rangasala, Kathmandu
Attendance: 4,400
Referee: Ranjita Devi Tekcham (India)
Player of the Match: Rashmi Ghising (APF)

14 December 2025
18:00
Match 8

| Nasrin (Bangladesh Football Federation) | 0–7 | (All India Football Federation) East Bengal |
|---|---|---|
| | Report | Ikwaput 7', 27', 45', 74', 90'; Chouhan 45+1'; Raul 73' |

Dasharath Rangasala, Kathmandu
Attendance: 299
Referee: Keomany Phengmeuagkhoun (Laos)
Player of the Match: Fazila Ikwaput (East Bengal)

17 December 2025
14:00
Match 9

| Transport United (Bhutan Football Federation) | 1–1 | (Bangladesh Football Federation) Nasrin |
|---|---|---|
| Tshering 38' | Report | Prity 87' |

Dasharath Rangasala, Kathmandu
Attendance: 203
Referee: Zin Mar Oo (Myanmar)
Player of the Match: Sauravi Akanda Prity (Nasrin)

17 December 2025
18:00
Match 10

| East Bengal (All India Football Federation) | 0–0 | (All Nepal Football Association) APF |
|---|---|---|
| | Report |

Dasharath Rangasala, Kathmandu
Attendance: 8,323
Referee: Yapa A. Pabasara Minisarani (Sri Lanka)
Player of the Match: Anjana Rana Magar (APF)

== Final ==
20 December 2025
17:00
Match 11

| East Bengal (All India Football Federation) | 3–0 | (Nepal) APF |
|---|---|---|
| Ikwaput 22', 46'; Hemam 35' | Report |

Dasharath Rangasala, Kathmandu
Attendance: 8,253
Referee: Keomany Phengmeuagkhoun (Laos)
Player of the Match: Shilky Devi Hemam (East Bengal)

== Top scorers ==
| Rank | Player | Team | Goals |
|---|---|---|---|
| 1 | (Federation of Uganda Football Associations) Fazila Ikwaput | (All India Football Federation) East Bengal | 9 |
| 2 | (All Nepal Football Association) Rashmi Ghising | (All Nepal Football Association) APF | 3 |
| 2 | (All India Football Federation) Sulanjana Raul | (All India Football Federation) East Bengal | 3 |
| 3 | (All Nepal Football Association) Mina Deuba | (All Nepal Football Association) APF | 2 |
| 3 | (Federation of Uganda Football Associations) Resty Nanziri | (All India Football Federation) East Bengal | 2 |

== Broadcasting rights ==
| Country | TV | Streaming (Youtube) | Streaming (Website) |
|---|---|---|---|
| Nepal | Himalaya TV | RONB (YouTube) | — |
| Worldwide | — | RONB (YouTube) | — |
| Worldwide | — | RONB (YouTube) | MSM Video |

== See also ==
- 2025–26 AFC Women's Champions League
- 2025 SAFF U-17 Women's Championship
- 2025 SAFF U-20 Women's Championship
