= 2020–21 Calcutta Women's Football League =

Calcutta Women's Football League
- Season: 2020–21
- Dates: Final Round -30 November 2020
- Premiers: SSB Women's (3rd title)
- Highest scoring: Maitri Sangha 24–0 Biddut FC

2020–21 Calcutta Women's Football League was the 25th season of the Calcutta Women's Football League, also known as the Kanyashree Cup. SSB Women's won their third title in the edition.

== Teams ==
Sl.	Teams	Sl.	Teams
1.	SSB Women's Club	13	Maitri Sangha
2.	WB Police	14	Police AC
3	Youth Footballers WA	15	Rampur Milan Sangha
4	GC Roy Memorial FC	16	Bally Gramanchal FC
5	Sorojini Naidu Club	17	J.B. Pur WFA
6	Manik Football CC	18	Chandney SC
7	Biddut FC	19	Behala Aikya Sammilani
8	Dumdumi Adivashi TBS	20	Sreebhumi FC
9	East Bengal FC	21	Jubak Sangha
10	Dipti Sangha	22	Akhil Bharatiya AVP
11	Vangar SWF		
12	Innovation FCC		

== Group A ==
=== Table ===
Pos	Team	Pld	W	D	L	GF	GA	GD	Pts	Qualification
1	SSB Women's	6	6	0	0	50	2	+48	18	Knock-out stage
2	Manik Football CC	4	3	0	1	27	11	+16	9	Knock-out stage
3	WB Police	4	3	0	1	17	3	+14	9	
4	Sorojini Naidu	3	1	0	2	7	7	0	3	
5	Dumdumi ATBS	3	1	0	2	3	25	−22	3	
6	Youth WA	1	0	0	1	0	11	−11	0	
7	Rampur MS	4	0	0	4	5	25	−20	0	
8	GC Roy Memorial	3	0	0	3	0	25	−25	0	

Source: IFA
Rules for classification: 1) points; 2) head-to-head points; 3) head-to-head goal difference; 4) goal difference; 5) number of goals scored; 6) drawing of lots

=== Matches ===
3 February 2020	WB Police	0–2	SSB Women's FC	Kolkata
16:00 IST				Stadium: East Bengal Ground

6 February 2020	Rampur Milan Sangha	1–2	Dumdumi Adivashi TBS	Kolkata
14:15 IST				Stadium: SSB 63 Battalion Ground

11 February 2020	W.B. Police SC	8–0	Rampur MS	Kolkata
14:15 IST	S.Maity(×5); N.Murmu; M.Sana; B.Dolui

11 February 2020	SSB Women's FC	16–0	Dudumi Adibasi TBS	Kolkata
14:15 IST	Anju; Kummri; A.Bala Debi(×2); Khossehb; S.Marandi; Monika(×2); S.Chanu; Sangita Basfore(×4); R.Debi(×2); S. Mandi	Report

12 February 2020	Manik F.C.C	11–0	Youth Footballers WA	Kolkata
14:15 IST	S.Khatun(×2); S.Mahato(×2); A.Khatun(×4); S.Mondal(×2); A.Sammader

13 February 2020	Sorojini Naidu OSC	6–0	G.C. Roy M.F.	Kolkata
14:15 IST	Singo Murmu(×3); Sangeeta Mahato(×3)

29 February 2020	W.B Police SC	8–1	Dumdumi Adibasi TBS	Kolkata
14:15 IST

29 February 2020	SSB Women's FC	9–1	Rampur MS	Kolkata
14:15 IST

1 March 2020	MANIK FOOTBALL FC	10–0	G.C.Roy Memorial FC	Kolkata
14:15 IST

4 March 2020	SSB Women's FC	6–1	Sorojini Naidu OSC	Kolkata
14:15 IST

4 March 2020	WB. Police SC	9–1	Manik FCC	Kolkata
14:15 IST

6 March 2020	SSB Women FC	8–0	Manik FCC	Kolkata
14:15 IST

7 March 2020	WB Police SC	1–0	Sorojini Naidu OSC	Kolkata
14:15 IST

13 March 2020	SSB Women's FC	9–0	G. C. Roy MFC	Kolkata
14:15 IST

13 March 2020	Rampur MS	3–6	Manick FCC	Kolkata
14:15 IST	Saraswati Soren; Baishakhi Das; Sushama Mandi		Suparna Mondal(×2); Jhuma Samaddar(×2); Shenawaz; Barna Khatun

== Group B ==
=== Table ===
Pos	Team	Pld	W	D	L	GF	GA	GD	Pts	Qualification
1	East Bengal	4	3	1	0	44	1	+43	10	Knock-out stage
2	Police AC	4	3	1	0	15	3	+12	10	Knock-out stage
3	Dipti Sangha	5	3	0	2	41	12	+29	9	
4	Maitri Sangha	3	1	0	2	24	11	+13	3	
5	Invention FC	2	1	0	1	8	3	+5	3	
6	Bhangor FC	3	0	0	3	0	42	−42	0	
7	Biddut FC	3	0	0	3	0	60	−60	0	

Source: IFA
Rules for classification: 1) points; 2) head-to-head points; 3) head-to-head goal difference; 4) goal difference; 5) number of goals scored; 6) drawing of lots

=== Matches ===
5 February 2020	Maitri Sangha	0–6	Police AC	Kolkata
14:15 IST				Stadium: SSB 63 Battalion Ground

5 February 2020	Vangor SWF	0–8	Innovation FC	Kolkata
14:15 IST				Stadium: Uluberia Stadium

6 February 2020	Dipti Sangha	1–6	East Bengal FC	Kolkata
14:15 IST		Report	Sangita Das; Sonali Soren; Tulsi Hembram(×2); Mamta Hansda(×2)	Stadium: East Bengal Ground

8 February 2020	Dipti Sangha	16–0	Biddut FC	Kolkata
14:15 IST	Riya Das(×4); Sathi Debnath(×4); Kabita Das(×3); Aasha Das(×3); Sushmita Barman(×2); Puja Roy(×2)			Stadium: SSB 63 Battalion Ground

8 February 2020	East Bengal FC	0–0	Police AC	Kolkata
14:15 IST				Stadium: Uluberia Stadium

12 February 2020	Dipti Sangha	14–0	Bhangore SWF	Kolkata
14:15 IST

13 February 2020	East Bengal FC	18–0	Bidyut Sporting Club	Kolkata
14:15 IST	Sangita Das(×5); Sunita Sarkar(×3); Mamata Hansda(×3); Riya Sukhdev(×3); Tulsi Hembram(×2); Riya Murmu; Sabita Baskey

13 February 2020	Police AC	3–0	Invention FCC	Kolkata
14:15 IST

6 March 2020	East Bengal FC	20–0	Bhangore SWF	Kolkata
14:15 IST	Tulsi Hembram(×8); Mamta Hansda(×4); Sunita Sarkar(×3); Sonali Soren(×2); Mamta Singh(×1); Rina Mahato(×1); Mina Khatun(×1)

6 March 2020	Police AC	6–3	Dipti Sangha	Kolkata
14:15 IST

6 March 2020	Moitree Samsad	24–0	Bidyut Sangha	Kolkata
14:15 IST

12 March 2020	Dipti Sangha FC	5–0	Maitri Sangha	Kolkata
14:15 IST

== Group C ==
=== Table ===
Pos	Team	Pld	W	D	L	GF	GA	GD	Pts	Qualification
1	Sreebhumi FC	5	4	1	0	24	1	+23	13	Knock-out stage
2	Chandney SC	5	4	1	0	11	3	+8	13	Knock-out stage
3	J.B. Pur WFA	4	2	0	2	12	4	+8	6	
4	Akhil AVP	3	0	1	2	1	11	−10	1	
5	Jubak Sangha	3	0	1	2	1	15	−14	1	
6	Behala Aikya Sammilani	2	0	0	2	0	6	−6	0	
7	Bally Gramanchal FC	2	0	0	2	0	9	−9	0	

Source: IFA
Rules for classification: 1) points; 2) head-to-head points; 3) head-to-head goal difference; 4) goal difference; 5) number of goals scored; 6) drawing of lots

=== Matches ===
10 February 2020	Bally Gramanchal FC	0–5	J.B. Pur WFA	Kolkata
14:15 IST

10 February 2020	Behala Aikya Sammilani	0–1	Chandney SC	Kolkata
14:15 IST

13 February 2020	Sreebhumi FC	11–0	Jubak Sangha	Kolkata
14:15 IST	Aruna Bag(×7); Monalisa Marandi; Sangeeta Biswas; Rubina Khatun(×2)

2 March 2020	Aikya Sammilani	0–5	J.B.Pur WFA	Kolkata
14:15 IST

2 March 2020	Sreebhumi FC	7–0	Akhil Bharatiya AVP	Kolkata
14:15 IST

2 March 2020	Jubak Sangha	0–3	Chandney SC	Kolkata
14:15 IST

4 March 2020	Chandney SC	3–2	J.B.Pur MFC	Kolkata
14:15 IST

4 March 2020	Jubak Sangha	1–1	Akhil Bharatiya AVP	Kolkata
14:15 IST

5 March 2020	Sreebhumi FC	4–0	Bally Gramanchal	Kolkata
14:15 IST

11 March 2020	Sreebhumi FC	1–0	JB Pur Women FA	Kolkata
14:15 IST

11 March 2020	Chandney SC	3–0	Akhil Bharatiya AVP	Kolkata
14:15 IST

30 November 2020	Sreebhumi FC	1–1	Chandney SC	Kolkata
14:15 IST	Aarti 23'		Rakhi 65'

2 December 2020	Chandney SC	v	Bally Gramanchal	Kolkata
14:15 IST

== Super 6 ==
=== Table ===
Pos	Team	Pld	W	D	L	GF	GA	GD	Pts	Qualification
1	SSB Women's	4	3	1	0	15	2	+13	10	Knock-out stage
2	Sreebhumi FC	3	1	1	1	9	2	+7	4	Knock-out stage
3	East Bengal	2	1	1	0	4	1	+3	4	Knock-out stage
4	Police AC	3	1	1	1	2	1	+1	4	Knock-out stage
5	Chandney SC	4	1	0	3	3	17	−14	3	
6	Sorojini Naidu	2	0	0	2	1	11	−10	0	

Source: IFA
Rules for classification: 1) points; 2) head-to-head points; 3) head-to-head goal difference; 4) goal difference; 5) number of goals scored; 6) drawing of lots

=== Matches ===
11 December 2020	Chandney SC	0–11	SSB Women's	Kolkata
14:15 IST			Ranjita Devi(×4); Duler Marandi(×2); Naorem(×2); Mangumi Bala Devi(×2); Jyotimala Devi

13 December 2020	Sreebhumi FC	8–0	Sorojini	Kolkata
14:15 IST

13 December 2020	Chandney SC	0–3	East Bengal	Kolkata
14:15 IST			Tulsi Hembram(x2); Aishwaria Arun Jagtap

13 December 2020	SSB Women's	1–0	Police AC	Kolkata
14:15 IST

16 December 2020	Sreebhumi FC	0–0	Police AC	Kolkata
14:15 IST				Stadium: Howrah Stadium

16 December 2020	Sorojini	1–3	Chandney SC	Kolkata
14:15 IST				Stadium: Rabindra Sorobar Stadium

16 December 2020	East Bengal	1–1	SSB Women's	Kolkata
14:15 IST	Sangita Das 85'		Ranjita Devi	Stadium: East Bengal FC & Aaryan Stadium

18 December 2020	SSB Women's	2–1	Sreebhumi FC	Kolkata
14:15 IST	Sharmila Chanu 30'; Ranjita Devi 55'		Mina Khatun 74'	Stadium: Hawrah Stadium

18 December 2020	Police AC	2–0	Chandney SC	Kolkata
14:15 IST	Debonita Roy51'; Yasoda Mandi 85'			Stadium: Rabindra Sorobar Stadium

21 December 2020	East Bengal	3–2	Police AC	Kolkata
14:15 IST	Tulsi Hembram (x2); Sunita Sarkar			Stadium: East Bengal FC & Aaryan Stadium

== Knock-out stages ==
=== Semifinals ===
11 December 2020	SSB Women's	1–0	Sreebhumi FC	Kolkata
14:15 IST

11 December 2020	Police AC	0–0 (4–5 p)	East Bengal	Kolkata
14:15 IST

=== Finals ===
30 December 2020	SSB Women's	2–0	East Bengal	Kolkata
14:15 IST
