= 2022–23 Calcutta Women's Football League =

Calcutta Women's Football League
- Season: 2022–23
- Dates: 20 December 2022–28 January 2023
- Champions: East Bengal (2nd title)
- Matches played: 100
- Goals scored: 614 (6.14 per match)
- Best Player: Sulanjana Raul (East Bengal)
- Top goalscorer: Sujata Mahata (23 goals) (New Alipore Suruchi Sangha)
- Best goalkeeper: Gurubari Mandi (Sreebhumi)
- Biggest home win: East Bengal 35–0 Behala Aikya Sammilani; 10 January 2023
- Biggest away win: Jubak Sangha 0–16 KFA Southern Samity; 27 December 2022; Akhil Bhartiya AVP 0–16 Sreebhumi; 20 January 2023
- Highest scoring: East Bengal 35–0 Behala Aikya Sammilani
- Longest winning run: 10 matches East Bengal
- Longest unbeaten run: 10 matches East Bengal
- Longest losing run: 6 matches Kolkata Union Sporting Club; Behala Aikya Sammilani; Durbar Sports Academy; Akhil Bhartiya

2022–23 Calcutta Women's Football League was the 27th season of the Calcutta Women's Football League, also known as the Kanyashree Cup.

The season consists of 32 teams participating in the league, with the teams in the group stage divided into four groups consisting of eight teams each. The top two teams from each group qualify for the knockout stage. Each team consists of a maximum of four outstation players and every team has two under-17 players. IFA has also appointed an "Integrity Officer" in each team for the sake of women footballers. On 28 January 2023, East Bengal defeated Sreebhumi 1–0 in the final to lift the Kanyashree Cup title and qualified for the Indian Women's League.

== Teams ==
CWFL Participants
| Group A | Group B | Group C | Group D |
|---|---|---|---|
| Akhil Bhartiya Adivasi Vikas Parishad | Adivasi United Students Club | Adivasi Taruni Bragen Sangha | Bhangore Sports Welfare Foundation |
| Chandney SC | All Airlines Recreation Club | ASOS Rainbow AC | Durbar Sports Academy |
| Invention FCC | Bally Gramanchal Krira Samity | Bidyut Sporting Club | GC Roy Memorial FC |
| J.B. Pur Women FA | Behala Aikya Sammilani | Jubak Sangha | Jyotirmoy Athletic Club |
| Manick Football CC | Dipti Sangha FC | KFA Southern Samity | Kalighat Sports Lovers Association |
| Sevayani S.W. Org | East Bengal | New Alipore Suruchi Sangha | Mohammedan Sporting |
| Sreebhumi FC | Kolkata Union Sporting Club | Police AC | Moitree Sansad |
| Youth Footballers Welfare Association | WB Police Club | Sarojini Naidu OSC | Rampur Milan Sangha |

== Venues ==
- Rabindra Sarobar Stadium
- East Bengal Ground
- Naihati Stadium
- Amal Dutta Stadium (Dumdum Surer Match)
- Mohammedan Sporting Ground
- Rishi Aurobindo Maidan, Konnagar
- Bidhannagar Sports Complex
- SAI Ground, Salt Lake
- Mohun Bagan Ground
- Netaji Sports Complex, Kamalgazi
- Barrackpore Stadium
- Dr Ambedkar Ground, Gayeshpur
- Kishore Bharati Krirangan

== Group stage ==
=== Group A ===
| Pos | Team | Pld | W | D | L | GF | GA | GD | Pts | Qualification |
|---|---|---|---|---|---|---|---|---|---|---|
| 1 | Sreebhumi | 7 | 7 | 0 | 0 | 77 | 0 | +77 | 21 | Advanced to Knockout stage |
| 2 | Chandney SC | 6 | 5 | 0 | 1 | 27 | 13 | +14 | 15 | Advanced to Knockout stage |
| 3 | Invention FCC | 7 | 4 | 1 | 2 | 22 | 17 | +5 | 13 | |
| 4 | Sevayani S.W. Org | 6 | 3 | 0 | 3 | 14 | 24 | −10 | 9 | |
| 5 | Manick Football CC | 7 | 2 | 2 | 3 | 8 | 16 | −8 | 8 | |
| 6 | J.B. Pur Women FA | 5 | 1 | 1 | 3 | 10 | 25 | −15 | 4 | |
| 7 | Youth Footballers Welfare Association | 4 | 0 | 0 | 4 | 3 | 14 | −11 | 0 | |
| 8 | Akhil Bhartiya Adivasi Vikas Parishad | 6 | 0 | 0 | 6 | 0 | 52 | −52 | 0 | |

Source: kolkatafootball.com

==== Matches ====
| 22 December 2022 | Manick Football CC | 2–0 | Youth Footballers Welfare Association | Kolkata |
| | | | | Stadium: East Bengal Ground |

| 22 December 2022 | Sreebhumi | 19–0 | J.B. Pur Women FA | Naihati |
| | | | | Stadium: Naihati Stadium |

| 22 December 2022 | Chandney SC | 11–0 | Akhil Bhartiya Adivasi Vikas Parishad | Kolkata |
| | | | | Stadium: Amal Dutta Stadium |

| 22 December 2022 | Sevayani S.W. Org | 1–6 | Invention FCC | Kolkata |
| | | | | Stadium: Mohammedan Sporting Ground |

| 27 December 2022 | Sevayani S.W. Org | 0–14 | Sreebhumi | Kolkata |
| | | | | Stadium: SAI Ground |

| 31 December 2022 | Manick Football CC | 0–7 | Chandney SC | Kolkata |
| | | | | Stadium: Rabindra Sarobar Stadium |

| 2 January 2023 | Invention FCC | 4–1 | Youth Footballers Welfare Association | Kolkata |
| | | | | Stadium: Rabindra Sarobar Stadium |

| 2 January 2023 | Akhil Bhartiya Adivasi Vikas Parishad | 0–6 | J.B. Pur Women FA | Konnagar |
| | | | Arpita Debnath 2x'; Debika Ghorui; Fulmani Soren 2x'; Archana Munda | Stadium: Rishi Aurobindo Maidan |

| 4 January 2023 | Chandney SC | 5–2 | Youth Footballers Welfare Association | Kolkata |
| | | | | Stadium: CFC Ground |

| 4 January 2023 | Invention FCC | 6–0 | Akhil Bhartiya Adivasi Vikas Parishad | Kolkata |
| | | | | Stadium: Rabindra Sarobar Stadium |

| 5 January 2023 | Manick Football CC | 0–6 | Sreebhumi | Kolkata |
| | | | | Stadium: Rabindra Sarobar Stadium |

| 6 January 2023 | Sevayani S.W. Org | 3–2 | J.B. Pur Women FA | Chinsura |
| | | | | Stadium: Eastern Chinsurah |

| 7 January 2023 | Youth Footballers Welfare Association | 0–3 (w/o) | Sreebhumi | Kolkata |
| | | | | Stadium: SAI Ground |
Note: Sreebhumi were handed a walkover by Youth Footballers Welfare Association

| 9 January 2023 | Manick Football CC | 2–2 | Invention FCC | Konnagar |
| | | | | Stadium: Rishi Aurobindo Maidan |

| 9 January 2023 | Akhil Bhartiya Adivasi Vikas Parishad | 0–9 | Sevayani S.W. Org | Barrackpore |
| | | | | Stadium: Barrackpore Stadium |

| 13 January 2023 | Sreebhumi | 10–0 | Chandney SC | Kolkata |
| | Roshni Verma 4x'; Singo Murmu 2x'; Mamata Hansda 2x'; Kakali Hansda; Sombari Hembram | | | Stadium: Bidhannagar Sports Complex |

| 13 January 2023 | Manick Football CC | 4–0 | Akhil Bhartiya Adivasi Vikas Parishad | Gayeshpur |
| | Banya Khatun 2x'; Pritha Das; Rajani Kshetrapal | | | Stadium: Dr Ambedkar Ground |

| 15 January 2023 | J.B. Pur Women FA | 2–3 | Invention FCC | Chinsura |
| | | | | Stadium: BS Park, Baidyabati |

| 16 January 2023 | Chandney SC | 2–0 | Sevayani S.W. Org | Kamalgazi |
| | Sanjukta Routh 2x' | | | Stadium: Netaji Sports Complex |

| 17 January 2023 | Manick Football CC | 0–0 | J.B. Pur Women FA | Gayeshpur |
| | | | | Stadium: Dr Ambedkar Ground |

| 18 January 2023 | Sreebhumi | 9–0 | Invention FCC | Kolkata |
| | | | | Stadium: Rabindra Sarobar Stadium |

| 19 January 2023 | Manick Football CC | 0–1 | Sevayani S.W. Org | Gayeshpur |
| | | | | Stadium: Dr Ambedkar Ground |

| 20 January 2023 | Akhil Bhartiya Adivasi Vikas Parishad | 0–16 | Sreebhumi | Chinsura |
| | | | | Stadium: Eastern Chinsura |

| 20 January 2023 | Invention FCC | 1–2 | Chandney SC | Kolkata |
| | | | | Stadium: Rabindra Sarobar Stadium |

=== Group B ===
| Pos | Team | Pld | W | D | L | GF | GA | GD | Pts | Qualification |
|---|---|---|---|---|---|---|---|---|---|---|
| 1 | East Bengal | 7 | 7 | 0 | 0 | 64 | 0 | +64 | 21 | Advanced to Knockout stage |
| 2 | WB Police Club | 7 | 5 | 1 | 1 | 34 | 7 | +27 | 16 | Advanced to Knockout stage |
| 3 | Bally Gramanchal Krira Samity | 7 | 4 | 1 | 2 | 35 | 14 | +21 | 13 | |
| 4 | Adivasi United Students Club | 7 | 3 | 2 | 2 | 22 | 9 | +13 | 11 | |
| 5 | All Airlines Recreation Club | 7 | 2 | 2 | 3 | 22 | 17 | +5 | 8 | |
| 6 | Dipti Sangha FC | 7 | 2 | 2 | 3 | 15 | 10 | +5 | 8 | |
| 7 | Kolkata Union Sporting Club | 6 | 0 | 0 | 6 | 1 | 50 | −49 | 0 | |
| 8 | Behala Aikya Sammilani | 6 | 0 | 0 | 6 | 0 | 86 | −86 | 0 | |

Source: kolkatafootball.com

==== Matches ====
| 20 December 2022 | WB Police Club | 0–2 | East Bengal | Kolkata |
| | | | Sulanjana Raul 24'; Mousumi Murmu 74' | Stadium: Rabindra Sarobar Stadium |

| 22 December 2022 | Dipti Sangha | 6–0 | Kolkata Union Sporting Club | Konnagar |
| | | | | Stadium: Rishi Aurobindo Maidan |

| 22 December 2022 | Adivasi United Students Club | 3–1 | Bally Gramanchal Krira Samity | Kolkata |
| | Arpita Roy 2x'; Dil Afroja Parveen | | | Stadium: Bidhannagar Sports Complex |

| 22 December 2022 | Behala Aikya Sammilani | 0–9 | All Airlines Recreation Club | Kolkata |
| | | | Sharmistha Sarkar 5x'; Muskan Khatun; Paromita Bera; Priya Roy 2x' | Stadium: Bidhannagar Sports Complex |

| 27 December 2022 | East Bengal | 9–0 | Bally Gramanchal Krira Samity | Kolkata |
| | Rumpa Halder 14'; Mousumi Murmu 21', 36'; Mina Khatun 28', 31', 70'; Sulanjana Raul 35', 44', 66' | | | Stadium: East Bengal Ground |

| 2 January 2023 | Behala Aikya Sammilani | 0–10 | Adivasi United Students Club | Barrackpore |
| | | | Arpita 2x'; Rakhi Hazra 2x'; Madhumita Mallick 2x'; Mahua Mallick 2x'; Rina Roy; Kanika Das | Stadium: Barrackpore Stadium |

| 2 January 2023 | All Airlines Recreation Club | 10–0 | Kolkata Union Sporting Club | Kolkata |
| | Sharmistha Sarkar 4x'; Paromita Bera 2x'; Debarati Roy 2x'; Sangita Roy; Rina Burman | | | Stadium: Mohun Bagan Ground |

| 2 January 2023 | Dipti Sangha | 2–4 | WB Police Club | Gayeshpur |
| | Anwar Khatoon; Satani Sarkar | | Nasimun Khatun; Sandhya Maity 2x'; Sagarika Baidya | Stadium: Dr Ambedkar Ground |

| 4 January 2023 | Dipti Sangha | 0–0 | Adivasi United Students Club | Konnagar |
| | | | | Stadium: Rishi Aurobindo Maidan |

| 5 January 2023 | WB Police Club | 9–0 | Kolkata Union Sporting Club | Kolkata |
| | | | | Stadium: Rabindra Sarobar Stadium |

| 5 January 2023 | Behala Aikya Sammilani | 0–12 | Bally Gramanchal Krira Samity | Kolkata |
| | | | | Stadium: Amal Dutta Stadium |

| 8 January 2023 | All Airlines Recreation Club | 0–9 | East Bengal | Kolkata |
| | | | Sulanjana Raul 6', 38', 85'; Rimpa Haldar 31', 48', 60'; Geeta Das 76'; Mousumi Murmu 81', 83' | Stadium: East Bengal Ground |

| 8 January 2023 | Bally Gramanchal Krira Samity | 2–2 | WB Police Club | Kolkata |
| | | | | Stadium: Amal Dutta Stadium |

| 8 January 2023 | Kolkata Union Sporting Club | 1–8 | Adivasi United Students Club | Barrackpore |
| | | | | Stadium: Barrackpore Stadium |

| 10 January 2023 | Dipti Sangha | 1–1 | All Airlines Recreation Club | Kolkata |
| | | | | Stadium: Amal Dutta Krirangan |

| 10 January 2023 | East Bengal | 35–0 | Behala Aikya Sammilani | Kolkata |
| 13:00 IST | Geeta Das 3', 20', 27', 39', 40'; Deblina Bhattacharjee 8', 21', 24', 29', 35'; Tanushree Oraon 13', 18'; Kabita Saren 15', 43', 50', 52', 70', 75'; Birsi Oraon 31'; Sushmita Bardhan 32', 36', 38', 67'; Mousumi Murmu 59', 79', 81', 85', 86', 90'; Aishwarya Arun Jagtap 69', 77', 79'; Piyali Kora 74'; Sulanjana Raul 75', 89' | Report | | Stadium: East Bengal Ground |

| 10 January 2023 | Adivasi United Students Club | 0–3 | WB Police Club | Barrackpore |
| | | | Sandhya Maity 2x'; Rubina Khatun | Stadium: Barrackpore Stadium |

| 13 January 2023 | Kolkata Union Sporting Club | – | Behala Aikya Sammilani | Chinsurah |
| | | | | Stadium: Central Chinsurah |

| 13 January 2023 | East Bengal | 3–0 (w/o) | Dipti Sangha | Kolkata |
| | | | | Stadium: East Bengal Ground |
Note: East Bengal were handed a walkover by Dipti Sangha

| 14 January 2023 | Bally Gramanchal Krira Samity | 4–0 | All Airlines Recreation Club | Kolkata |
| | | | | Stadium: NSC Kamalgazi |

| 16 January 2023 | East Bengal | 3–0 (w/o) | Kolkata Union Sporting Club | Kolkata |
| | | | | Stadium: East Bengal Ground |
Note: East Bengal were handed a walkover by Kolkata Union Sporting Club

| 16 January 2023 | WB Police Club | 14–0 | Behala Aikya Sammilani | Barrackpore |
| | Rubina Kharun 3x'; Kakali Karmakar; Sandhya Maity 7x'; Nasimun Khatoon; Sagorika Baidya 2x' | | | Stadium: Barrackpore Stadium |

| 17 January 2023 | Dipti Sangha | 0–2 | Bally Gramanchal Krira Samity | Chinsurah |
| | | | Sarbani Murmu; Sweta Singh | Stadium: Central Chinsurah |

| 17 January 2023 | Adivasi United Students Club | 1–1 | All Airlines Recreation Club | Khardah |
| | Arpita Roy | | Muskan Khatun | Stadium: Khardah Stadium |

| 19 January 2023 | East Bengal | 3–0 | Adivasi United Students Club | Kolkata |
| | Shivani Toppo 21'; Sushmita Bardhan 80'; Aishwarya Arun Jagtap 90' | | | Stadium: East Bengal Ground |

| 19 January 2023 | Dipti Sangha | 6–0 | Behala Aikya Sammilani | Kolkata |
| | Lotika Mal 3x'; Sangeeta Mahato 3x' | | | Stadium: Rabindra Sarobar Stadium |

| 19 January 2023 | Bally Gramanchal Krira Samity | 14–0 | Kolkata Union Sporting Club | Barrackpore |
| | | | | Stadium: Barrackpore Stadium |

| 20 January 2023 | All Airlines Recreation Club | 1–2 | WB Police Club | Kolkata |
| | | | | Stadium: SAI Ground |

=== Group C ===
| Pos | Team | Pld | W | D | L | GF | GA | GD | Pts | Qualification |
|---|---|---|---|---|---|---|---|---|---|---|
| 1 | ASOS Rainbow AC | 6 | 6 | 0 | 0 | 51 | 2 | +49 | 18 | Advanced to Knockout stage |
| 2 | New Alipore Suruchi Sangha | 5 | 4 | 0 | 1 | 45 | 4 | +41 | 12 | Advanced to Knockout stage |
| 3 | KFA Southern Samity | 5 | 3 | 0 | 2 | 25 | 6 | +19 | 9 | |
| 4 | Sarojini Naidu OSC | 5 | 2 | 0 | 3 | 13 | 21 | −8 | 6 | |
| 5 | Jubak Sangha | 5 | 2 | 0 | 3 | 6 | 46 | −40 | 6 | |
| 6 | Adivasi Taruni Bragen Sangha | 5 | 1 | 0 | 4 | 5 | 36 | −31 | 3 | |
| 7 | Police AC | 0 | 0 | 0 | 0 | 0 | 0 | 0 | 0 | |
| 8 | Bidyut Sporting Club | 5 | 0 | 0 | 5 | 0 | 30 | −30 | 0 | |

Source: kolkatafootball.com

==== Matches ====
| 27 December 2022 | Sarojini Naidu OSC | 0–8 | ASOS Rainbow AC | Kolkata |
| | | | Titli Sarkar 3x'; Ambika Devi 2x'; Bandaa Roy; Bijeiya Chanu; Supriya Kispotta | Stadium: Bidhannagar Sports Complex |

| 27 December 2022 | Adivasi Taruni Bragen Sangha | 5–0 | Bidyut Sporting Club | Konnagar |
| | | | | Stadium: Rishi Aurobindo Maidan |

| 27 December 2022 | Jubak Sangha | 0–16 | KFA Southern Samity | Kolkata |
| | | | | Stadium: Amal Dutta Stadium |

| 31 December 2022 | KFA Southern Samity | 0–3 | ASOS Rainbow AC | Kolkata |
| | | | Ambika Devi 3x' | Stadium: Amal Dutta Stadium |

| 31 December 2022 | Sarojini Naidu OSC | 0–9 | New Alipore Suruchi Sangha | Barrackpore |
| | | | Sujata 4x'; Anjali Soren 3x'; Sonamoni Soren; Sarjida Khatun | Stadium: Barrackpore Stadium |

| 3 January 2023 | Jubak Sangha | 3–0 (w/o) | Adivasi Taruni Bragen Sangha | Chinsura |
| | | | | Stadium: BS Park |
Note: Jubak Sangha were handed a walkover by Adivasi Taruni Bragen Sangha

| 4 January 2023 | New Alipore Suruchi Sangha | 2–3 | ASOS Rainbow AC | Barrackpore |
| | | | Ambika 28', 40'; Titli 45' | Stadium: Barrackpore Stadium |

| 5 January 2023 | Sarojini Naidu OSC | 5–0 | Adivasi Taruni Bragen Sangha | Kolkata |
| | | | | Stadium: SAI Ground |

| 6 January 2023 | Jubak Sangha | 3–0 | Bidyut Sporting Club | Kolkata |
| | Lakshmi Sardar 2x'; Moumita Sardar | | | Stadium: Bidhannagar Sports Complex |

| 7 January 2023 | Sarojini Naidu OSC | 0–4 | KFA Southern Samity | Gayeshpur |
| | | | Mariyum Khatun 3x'; Sangita Kumari | Stadium: Dr Ambedkar Ground |

| 8 January 2023 | ASOS Rainbow AC | 14–0 | Adivasi Taruni Bragen Sangha | Konnagar |
| | Ambika 3x'; Shibangi 3x'; Sanjana 3x'; Hema 2x'; Sushanna; Palmu; Sona | | | Stadium: Rishi Aurobindo Maidan |

| 14 January 2023 | ASOS Rainbow AC | 13–0 | Jubak Sangha | Barrackpore |
| | Titli 18', 28', 40', 45', 48', 51', 66'; Ambika 22', 27', 41'; Bijeiya 38', 47'; Piyali 46' | | | Stadium: Barrackpore Stadium |

| 15 January 2023 | Bidyut Sporting Club | 0–4 | KFA Southern Samity | Kolkata |
| | | | | Stadium: Rabindra Sarobar Stadium |

| 15 January 2023 | Adivasi Taruni Bragen Sangha | 0–14 | New Alipore Suruchi Sangha | Kolkata |
| | | | | Stadium: Rabindra Sarobar Stadium |

| 17 January 2023 | New Alipore Suruchi Sangha | 17–0 | Jubak Sangha | Barrackpore |
| | | | | Stadium: Barrackpore Stadium |

| 18 January 2023 | Sarojini Naidu OSC | 8–0 | Bidyut Sporting Club | Gayeshpur |
| | | | | Stadium: Dr Ambedkar Ground |

| 19 January 2023 | New Alipore Suruchi Sangha | 3–1 | KFA Southern Samity | Kolkata |
| | | | | Stadium: Rabindra Sarobar Stadium |

| 20 January 2023 | Bidyut Sporting Club | 0–10 | ASOS Rainbow AC | Kolkata |
| | | | Ambika 5', 57', 68'; Titli 34'; Sanjana 59', 62'; Bijeiya 63', 70', 90'; Palmu 90+3' | Stadium: East Bengal Ground |

=== Group D ===
| Pos | Team | Pld | W | D | L | GF | GA | GD | Pts | Qualification |
|---|---|---|---|---|---|---|---|---|---|---|
| 1 | Moitree Sansad | 7 | 5 | 1 | 1 | 29 | 4 | +25 | 16 | Advanced to Knockout stage |
| 2 | Mohammedan Sporting | 6 | 5 | 1 | 0 | 25 | 1 | +24 | 16 | Advanced to Knockout stage |
| 3 | Kalighat Sports Lovers Association | 6 | 5 | 0 | 1 | 39 | 3 | +36 | 15 | |
| 4 | Jyotirmoy Athletic Club | 7 | 4 | 0 | 3 | 10 | 9 | +1 | 12 | |
| 5 | GC Roy Memorial FC | 6 | 2 | 0 | 4 | 7 | 16 | −9 | 6 | |
| 6 | Bhangore Sports Welfare Foundation | 6 | 2 | 0 | 4 | 7 | 31 | −24 | 6 | |
| 7 | Rampur Milan Sangha | 6 | 1 | 0 | 5 | 6 | 27 | −21 | 3 | |
| 8 | Durbar Sports Academy | 6 | 0 | 0 | 6 | 1 | 33 | −32 | 0 | |

Source: kolkatafootball.com

==== Matches ====
| 31 December 2022 | Moitree Sansad | 2–0 | Jyotirmoy Athletic Club | Kamalgazi |
| | Priya Rui Das; Sainur Khatun | | | Stadium: Netaji Sports Complex |

| 31 December 2022 | GC Roy Memorial FC | 3–0 | Durbar Sports Academy | Kolkata |
| | | | | Stadium: Rabindra Sarobar Stadium |

| 31 December 2022 | Bhangore Sports Welfare Foundation | 0–9 | Mohammedan Sporting | Kolkata |
| | | | Neha 3x'; Anita 3x'; Payal 2x'; Neelu | Stadium: East Bengal Ground |

| 31 December 2022 | Rampur Milan Sangha | 1–11 | Kalighat Sports Lovers Association | Kolkata |
| | | | | Stadium: Mohun Bagan Ground |

| 2 January 2023 | Bhangore Sports Welfare Foundation | 3–1 | Rampur Milan Sangha | Kolkata |
| | Puja Mirdha; Rashmoni Mardi 2x' | | Mousumi Halder | Stadium: Rabindra Sarobar Stadium |

| 2 January 2023 | GC Roy Memorial FC | 0–5 | Moitree Sansad | Kamalgazi |
| | | | Pinki Bakti 2x'; Sharada Mahato 2x'; Sainur Khatun | Stadium: Netaji Sports Complex |

| 4 January 2023 | Mohammedan Sporting | 8–1 | Durbar Sports Academy | Kolkata |
| | Anita; Priya; Jasoda; Neha; Pandimit; Payel | | | Stadium: Rabindra Sarobar Stadium |

| 4 January 2023 | Jyotirmoy Athletic Club | 0–5 | Kalighat Sports Lovers Association | Kolkata |
| | | | Devneta Roy 4x'; Kajal Hembram | Stadium: CFC Ground |

| 6 January 2023 | GC Roy Memorial FC | 3–0 | Rampur Milan Sangha | Kolkata |
| | | | | Stadium: SAI Ground |

| 6 January 2023 | Bhangore Sports Welfare Foundation | 0–12 | Kalighat Sports Lovers Association | Kolkata |
| | | | Devneta Roy 8x'; Durgamoti Tudu; Kajal Hembram 2x'; Rojina Khatun | Stadium: Amal Dutta Stadium |

| 6 January 2023 | Mohammedan Sporting | 2–0 | Jyotirmoy Athletic Club | Kolkata |
| | Anita Kumari; Neha | | | Stadium: East Bengal Ground |

| 7 January 2023 | Moitree Sansad | 8–0 | Durbar Sports Academy | Kolkata |
| | Priyanka Ruidas 4x'; Sahinur Khatun 3x'; Sarada Maahato; Shila Bagti | | | Stadium: SAI Ground |

| 8 January 2023 | GC Roy Memorial FC | 0–4 | Mohammedan Sporting | Kolkata |
| | | | Neha 49'; Laxmi 71'; Anita 80'; ? 82' (o.g.) | Stadium: Rabindra Sarobar Stadium |

| 8 January 2023 | Jyotirmoy Athletic Club | 1–0 | Bhangore Sports Welfare Foundation | Kolkata |
| | | | | Stadium: Rabindra Sarobar Stadium |

| 9 January 2023 | Kalighat Sports Lovers Association | 3–0 | Moitree Sansad | Kolkata |
| | | | | Stadium: Amal Dutta Stadium |

| 10 January 2023 | Durbar Sports Academy | 0–3 | Rampur Milan Sangha | Kolkata |
| | | | | Stadium: Rabindra Sarobar Stadium |

| 13 January 2023 | GC Roy Memorial FC | 0–3 | Jyotirmoy Athletic Club | Khardah |
| | | | | Stadium: Khardah Stadium |

| 14 January 2023 | Rampur Milan Sangha | 1–7 | Moitree Sansad | Gayeshpur |
| | | | Sainir Khatoon; Priya Ruidas; Shila Bakti 3x'; Shya Karmakar; N. Mahato | Stadium: Dr Ambedkar Ground |

| 14 January 2023 | Kalighat Sports Lovers Association | 0–2 | Mohammedan Sporting | Kolkata |
| | | | ? 26' (o.g.); Jyoti 48' | Stadium: Mohun Bagan Ground |

| 16 January 2023 | Durbar Sports Academy | – | Bhangore Sports Welfare Foundation | Chinsurah |
| | | | | Stadium: Eastern Chinsurah |

| 18 January 2023 | Moitree Sansad | 7–0 | Bhangore Sports Welfare Foundation | Khardah |
| | Sainur Khatoon 4x'; Priya Ruidas 2x'; Chaya Karmakar | | | Stadium: Khardah Stadium |

| 18 January 2023 | Durbar Sports Academy | 0–3 | Jyotirmoy Athletic Club | Chinsurah |
| | | | | Stadium: BS Park, Baidyabati |

| 20 January 2023 | Mohammedan Sporting | 0–0 | Moitree Sansad | Kolkata |
| | | | | Stadium: Mohammedan Sporting Ground |

| 20 January 2023 | GC Roy Memorial FC | 1–4 | Bhangore Sports Welfare Foundation | Barrackpore |
| | | | | Stadium: Barrackpore Stadium |

| 20 January 2023 | Jyotirmoy Athletic Club | 3–0 | Rampur Milan Sangha | Kolkata |
| | | | | Stadium: East Bengal Ground |

| 20 January 2023 | Kalighat Sports Lovers Association | 8–0 | Durbar Sports Academy | Kolkata |
| | | | | Stadium: Rabindra Sarobar Stadium |

== Knockout stage ==
=== Qualified teams ===
The top two placed teams from each of the four groups qualified for the knockout stage.

| Group | Winners | Runner-up |
|---|---|---|
| A | Sreebhumi | Chandney SC |
| B | East Bengal | WB Police Club |
| C | ASOS Rainbow AC | New Alipore Suruchi Sangha |
| D | Mohammedan Sporting | Kalighat SLA |

=== Bracket ===
Quarter-finals
22 January 2023
Sreebhumi | 4
Kalighat SLA | 1
22 January 2023
WB Police Club | 4
ASOS Rainbow AC | 0
23 January 2023
Chandney SC | 0
Mohammedan Sporting | 1
23 January 2023
East Bengal | 2
New Alipore Suruchi Sangha | 1

Semi-finals
25 January 2023
Sreebhumi | 1
WB Police Club | 0
25 January 2023
Mohammedan Sporting | 0
East Bengal | 3

Final
28 January 2023
Sreebhumi | 0
East Bengal | 1

=== Quarter-finals ===
| Team 1 | Score | Team 2 |
|---|---|---|
| Sreebhumi | 4–1 | Kalighat SLA |
| WB Police Club | 4–0 | ASOS Rainbow AC |
| East Bengal | 2–1 | New Alipore Suruchi Sangha |
| Chandney SC | 0–1 | Mohammedan |

==== Matches ====
| 22 January 2023 QF–1 | Sreebhumi | 4–1 | Kalighat SLA | Kolkata |
| 14:00 IST | Roshni Verma 16'; Mugli Soren 56'; Tulsi Hembram 81', 83' | Report; Report; Match Summary | Devneta Roy 24' | Stadium: East Bengal Ground; Attendance: 1500; MVP: Tulsi Hembram (Sreebhumi) |

| 22 January 2023 QF–2 | WB Police Club | 4–0 | ASOS Rainbow AC | Barrackpore |
| 14:00 IST | Rubina Khatun 3'; Sandhya Maity 9', 45+1', 50' | Report; Report; Match Summary | | Stadium: Barrackpore Stadium; Attendance: 700; MVP: Sandhya Maity (WB Police Club) |

| 23 January 2023 QF–3 | Chandney SC | 0–1 | Mohammedan Sporting | Kolkata |
| 14:00 IST | | Report; Report; Match Summary | Jyoti Barwa 48' | Stadium: Mohammedan Sporting Ground; Attendance: 2000; MVP: Jyoti Barwa (Mohammedan Sporting) |

| 23 January 2023 QF–4 | East Bengal | 2–1 | New Alipore Suruchi Sangha | Kolkata |
| 14:00 IST | Mousumi Murmu 22'; Sulanjana Raul 45+2' | Report; Report; Match Summary | Sarjida Khatun 82' | Stadium: East Bengal Ground; Attendance: 200; MVP: Rimpa Haldar (East Bengal) |

=== Semi-finals ===
| Team 1 | Score | Team 2 |
|---|---|---|
| Sreebhumi | 1–0 | WB Police Club |
| Mohammedan | 0–3 | East Bengal |

==== Matches ====
| 25 January 2023 SF–1 | Sreebhumi | 1–0 | WB Police Club | Kolkata |
| 14:00 IST | Mugli Saren 61' | Report; Report; Match Summary | | Stadium: Mohun Bagan Ground; Attendance: 100; MVP: Mugli Saren (Sreebhumi) |

| 25 January 2023 SF–2 | Mohammedan Sporting | 0–3 | East Bengal | Kolkata |
| 14:00 IST | | Report; Report; Match Summary | Rimpa Halder 44', 56'; Nimita Gurung 79' (o.g.) | Stadium: Kishore Bharati Krirangan; Attendance: 2000; Referee: Kanika Barman; MVP: Rimpa Halder (East Bengal) |

=== Final ===
==== Summary ====
The 2022–23 Kanyashree Cup final was held at the Kishore Bharati Krirangan on 28 January 2023 between Sreebhumi and East Bengal. East Bengal reached their fourth final, having won the tournament once previously back in 2001, and been runner-up twice in 2002 and 2020. They had defeated Mohammedan Sporting 3–0 in the semi-final. Whereas, Sreebhumi reached their second final, being runner-up in 2019. They had defeated W.B. Police Club 1–0 in the semi-final. The match kicked off with East Bengal leading the proceedings from the beginning and dominating possession but could not break the deadlock. The solitary goal game in the eighty-eighth minute of the match when a long throw-in from Anita Oraon was partially cleared which fell onto the feet of Kabita Saren, who put in a cross and was met by Sulanjana Raul with a header that found the back of the net at the far post. East Bengal managed to hold onto the lead for the remainder of the game and was crowned as the 2022–23 Kanyashree Cup winners, lifting their second title after 2001.

==== Match ====
28 January 2023
14:00 IST

| Sreebhumi | 0–1 | East Bengal |
|---|---|---|
| | Report; Report; Match Summary | Sulanjana Raul 89' |

Kishore Bharati Krirangan, Kolkata
Attendance: 3,000
Referee: Kanika Barman

| Sreebhumi | East Bengal |

| GK | 21 | Gurubari Mandi |
| RB | 27 | Atasi Pal |
| CB | 3 | Mugli Soren |
| CB | 4 | Mamata Singh (c) |
| LB | 5 | Pratima Mahata |
| CM | 14 | Mugli Hembram |
| CM | 7 | Mamata Hansda |
| RW | 9 | Mamata Mahata | (substituted off) 90+3' |
| LW | 11 | Chapa Mistry |
| CF | 28 | Roshni Verma |
| LF | 12 | Tulsi Hembram |
Substitutions:
| GK | 1 | Hansika Gond |
| FW | 8 | Sombari Hembram |
| DF | 36 | Sonia Murmu |
| MF | 20 | Dolly Kumari | (substituted in) 90+3' |
| FW | 4 | Pungi Mandi |
| MF | 17 | Kakali Hansda |
| MF | 15 | Singo Murmu |
| FW | 16 | Sonali Mondal |
| FW | 18 | Priyasa Sarkar |
| FW | 25 | Sonali Karmakar |
Head Coach:
Pratima Biswas

| GK | 41 | Buli Sarkar (c) |
| RB | 2 | Anita Oraon |
| CB | 5 | Ratna Halder | (yellow card) 64' |
| CB | 4 | Mini Roy |
| LB | 3 | Riya Sarkar |
| CM | 7 | Puja Karmakar | | (substituted off) 45' |
| CM | 8 | Kabita Saren |
| LW | 25 | Shivani Toppo |
| CF | 14 | Rimpa Halder |
| CF | 22 | Sulanjana Raul |
| RW | 21 | Mousumi Murmu |
Substitutions:
| GK | 51 | Mamani Das |
| FW | 10 | Aishwarya Arun Jagtap |
| DF | 24 | Poli Koley |
| MF | 20 | Trisha Mallick |
| FW | 18 | Tanushre Oraon |
| MF | 9 | Tamalika Sarkar |
| MF | 11 | Barnali Karar | | (substituted in) 45' |
| FW | 28 | Deblina Bhattacharjee |
| FW | 15 | Gita Das |
| FW | 16 | Sushmita Bardhan |
Head Coach:
Sujata Kar

Player of the Match:
Sulanjana Raul (East Bengal)

Assistant referees:
Sujata Palit
Sandhya Rana
Fourth official:
Monika Jana
Match commissioner:
Debjit Das

Match rules

- 90 minutes.
- 30 minutes of extra time if necessary.
- Penalty shoot-out if scores still level.
- Ten named substitutes
- Maximum of five substitutions, with a sixth allowed in extra time.

== Season awards ==
The following awards were announced at the end of the season:

- Emerging Player of the Tournament: Sulanjana Raul (East Bengal)
- Highest Goalscorer: Sujata Mahata (New Alipore Suruchi Sangha) – 23 goals in 7 matches
- Best Goalkeeper: Gurubari Mandi (Sreebhumi)
