= 2025–26 Calcutta Women's Football League =

Indian women's football league season

Calcutta Women's Football League
- Season: 2025–26
- Dates: 27 February – 29 May 2026
- Champions: East Bengal (4th title)
- Matches: 42
- Goals: 224 (5.33 per match)
- Biggest home win: East Bengal 21–0 Dipti Sangha (26 March 2026)
- Biggest away win: Kalighat SLA 0–8 East Bengal (29 March 2026)
- Highest scoring: East Bengal 21–0 Dipti Sangha (2 April 2026)
- Longest winning run: East Bengal (6 matches)
- Longest unbeaten run: East Bengal (6 matches)

2025–26 Calcutta Women's Football League is the 30th season of the Calcutta Women's Football League, also known as the Kanyashree Cup.

The 2025–26 season consists of 16 teams participating in the league, with the teams in the group stage divided into two groups consisting of eight teams respectively. The tournament began on 27 February 2026 with SSB Women facing Bally Gramanchal KS at the Uluberia Ground, Uluberia. The matches of Group B started on 23 March 2026 with defending champions East Bengal facing Moitree Sansad at the East Bengal Ground.

== Teams ==
CWFL participants
Group 1	Group 2
Bally Gramanchal Krira Samity	East Bengal
Jyotirmoy Athletic Club	Chandney SC
Sarojini Naidu OSC	Kalighat Sports Lovers Association
KFA Southern Samity	Moitree Sansad
Sevayani S.W. Org	Dipti Sangha
Suruchi Sangha	Sribhumi
Police AC	United Kolkata SC
SSB Women	WB Police Club

▲ Promoted from 2024–25 CWFL B Division

- United Kolkata SC
- Police AC

== Venues ==
- Kalyani Stadium
- Uluberia jGround
- HB Block Ground
- Chinsurah Eastern Ground
- Rabindra Sarobar Stadium
- East Bengal Ground
- Naihati Stadium
- Tribeni Tissue Ground
- Rishi Aurobindo Maidan, Konnagar
- SSB Ground
- Barrackpore Stadium

== Group stage ==
=== Group A ===
Pos	Team	Pld	W	D	L	GF	GA	GD	Pts	Qualification	SSBW	NASS	POAC	JMAC	BGKS	SNOS	SSWO	KFSS
1	SSB Women	5	4	1	0	12	2	+10	13	Advanced to Championship round	—					4–0		~~10 Mar~~
2	Suruchi Sangha	5	3	2	0	11	5	+6	11	Advanced to Championship round	1–1	—			2–1	4–0		
3	Police AC	5	3	1	1	17	3	+14	10	Advanced to Championship round	0–1	1–1	—	7–1	4–0	5–0		~~7 Mar~~
4	Jyotirmoy Athletic Club	5	1	1	3	6	15	−9	4	Advanced to Championship round	0–3	2–3		—	2–1			
5	Bally Gramanchal Krira Samity	5	1	0	4	4	11	−7	3		1–3				—	1–0		~~15 Mar~~
6	Sarojini Naidu OSC	5	0	1	4	1	15	−14	1					1–1		—		~~12 Mar~~
7	Sevayani S.W. Org (R)	0	0	0	0	0	0	0	0	Withdrew							—	
8	KFA Southern Samity (R)	0	0	0	0	0	0	0	0	Withdrew		~~5 Mar~~		~~27 Feb~~				—

Source: The Away End
(R) Relegated

=== Group B ===
Pos	Team	Pld	W	D	L	GF	GA	GD	Pts	Qualification	EBFC	UKSC	SBFC	WBPS	KSLA	DPSG	MOSS	CDSC
1	East Bengal	7	7	0	0	54	1	+53	21	Advanced to Championship round	—		2–1			21–0	12–0	3–0*
2	United Kolkata SC	7	6	0	1	55	2	+53	18	Advanced to Championship round	0–2	—	1–0	6–0	9–0	13–0	17–0	9–0
3	Sribhumi	7	5	0	2	26	5	+21	15	Advanced to Championship round			—		4–1		10–0	2–0
4	WB Police Club	7	4	0	3	18	17	+1	12	Advanced to Championship round	0–6		0–2	—		7–2		
5	Kalighat Sports Lovers Association	7	3	0	4	9	28	−19	9		0–8			0–3	—			2–0
6	Dipti Sangha	7	1	1	5	8	52	−44	4				1–7		2–3	—	1–1	
7	Moitree Sansad	7	0	2	5	4	47	−43	2					0–3	2–3		—	1–1
8	Chandney SC	7	0	1	6	2	24	−22	1					1–5		0–2		—

Source: The Away End
- * = Chandney SC gave walkover to East Bengal.

== Championship round ==
4 top-ranked teams from each group qualified for this round. Defending champions East Bengal defeated United Kolkata 2–0 to become the champions of group B and enter the championship round.

In the championship round, each team who qualified, would play each team from the other group once and after four matches, the champions would be decided.

=== Championship Round Table ===
Pos	Team	Pld	W	D	L	GF	GA	GD	Pts	Qualification	EBFC	UKSC	WBPS	SBFC	POAC	SSBW	JMAC	NASS
1	East Bengal	4	4	0	0	42	1	+41	12	Champions	—							
2	United Kolkata SC	4	4	0	0	15	0	+15	12	Eligible for IWL2 (Note: If the top teams are already playing in national leagues, then the next highest ranked team(s) would be eligible for IWL2.)		—						
3	WB Police Club	4	2	1	1	10	3	+7	7				—					
4	Sribhumi	4	2	0	2	9	8	+1	6					—				
5	Police AC	4	1	1	2	4	9	−5	4		0–7	0–1	1–1	3–0*	—			
6	SSB Women	4	1	0	3	5	26	−21	3		1–12	0–8	2–0	2–6		—		
7	Jyotirmoy Athletic Club	4	1	0	3	3	29	−26	3		0–20	0–3*	0–6	3–0*			—	
8	Suruchi Sangha	4	0	0	4	0	12	−12	0		0–3*	0–3*	0–3*	0–3*				—

Source: The Away End
- * New Alipore Suruchi Sangha gave walkovers to Sribhumi, United Kolkata, East Bengal and West Bengal Police; Sreebhumi gave walkover to Jyotirmoy and Police; Jyotirmoy gave walkover to United Kolkata.
