= 2001 Calcutta Women's Football League =

Calcutta Women's Football League
- Season: 2001
- Dates: 12 February–16 March
- Champions: East Bengal (1st title)
- Matches: 36
- Goals: 129 (3.58 per match)

2001 Calcutta Women's Football League was the 9th season of the Calcutta Women's Football League.

The season consisted of twelve teams divided into two groups. The top four teams of each group would qualify for the knockouts where they would face each other in the quarterfinals. This was the first season that Kolkata giants East Bengal and Mohun Bagan formed and fielded their women's teams with East Bengal clinching the final 1–0 against Mohun Bagan to lift their first-ever title. Shanta Dhara scored the winning goal in the final.

== Teams ==
CWFL Participants
Group A	Group B
Bidyut Sporting	Bally Gramanchal
East Bengal	Itika Memorial
Income Tax	Jubak Sangha
Kasba Samannay	Mohun Bagan
Nabajanma Sangha	NPC Academy
Young Footballers	Rampur Milan Sangha

== Group stage ==
=== Group A ===
Pos	Team	Pld	W	D	L	GF	GA	GD	Pts	Qualification
1	Mohun Bagan	5	5	0	0	21	0	+21	15	Advanced to Knockout stage
2	Jubak Sangha	5	3	1	1	9	2	+7	10	Advanced to Knockout stage
3	Bally Gramanchal	4	2	0	2	7	7	0	6	Advanced to Knockout stage
4	Itika Memorial	4	1	2	1	3	6	−3	5	Advanced to Knockout stage
5	NPC Academy	5	1	1	3	4	10	−6	4	
6	Rampur Milan Sangha	5	0	0	5	0	19	−19	0	

Source: indianfootball.de

==== Matches ====
12 February 2001	Mohun Bagan	6–0	Rampur Milan Sangha	Kolkata
				Stadium: SAI Complex

14 February 2001	Jubak Sangha	2–0	NPC Academy	Kolkata

15 February 2001	Mohun Bagan	5–0	Itika Memorial	Kolkata

16 February 2001	Jubak Sangha	5–0	Rampur Milan Sangha	Kolkata

16 February 2001	Bally Gramanchal	4–0	NPC Academy	Kolkata

20 February 2001	Itika Memorial	1–1	NPC Academy	Kolkata

20 February 2001	Bally Gramanchal	3–0	Rampur Milan Sangha	Kolkata

21 February 2001	Mohun Bagan	2–0	Jubak Sangha	Kolkata

22 February 2001	Jubak Sangha	2–0	Bally Gramanchal	Kolkata

22 February 2001	Itika Memorial	2–0	Rampur Milan Sangha	Kolkata

23 February 2001	Mohun Bagan	3–0	NPC Academy	Kolkata

26 February 2001	NPC Academy	3–0	Rampur Milan Sangha	Kolkata

26 February 2001	Itika Memorial	0–0	Jubak Sangha	Kolkata

27 February 2001	Mohun Bagan	5–0	Bally Gramanchal	Kolkata

=== Group B ===
Pos	Team	Pld	W	D	L	GF	GA	GD	Pts	Qualification
1	Income Tax	5	4	1	0	30	0	+30	13	Advanced to Knockout stage
2	East Bengal	5	4	1	0	17	0	+17	13	Advanced to Knockout stage
3	Nabajanma Sangha	5	3	0	2	10	7	+3	9	Advanced to Knockout stage
4	Young Footballers	5	2	0	3	4	12	−8	6	Advanced to Knockout stage
5	Bidyut Sporting	5	1	0	4	5	20	−15	3	
6	Kasba Samannay	5	0	0	5	0	27	−27	0	

Source: indianfootball.de

==== Matches ====
13 February 2001	East Bengal	7–0	Bidyut Sporting	Kolkata

13 February 2001	Nabajanma Sangha	6–0	Kasba Samannay	Kolkata

14 February 2001	Income Tax	9–0	Young Footballers	Kolkata

15 February 2001	Bidyut Sporting	5–0	Kasba Samannay	Kolkata

19 February 2001	East Bengal	2–0	Young Footballers	Kolkata

19 February 2001	Income Tax	5–0	Nabajanma Sangha	Kolkata

21 February 2001	Income Tax	7–0	Kasba Samannay	Kolkata

21 February 2001	Young Footballers	1–0	Bidyut Sporting	Kolkata

22 February 2001	East Bengal	2–0	Nabajanma Sangha	Kolkata
	Shanta Dhara; Najda Tabasum	Report

23 February 2001	Income Tax	9–0	Bidyut Sporting	Kolkata

24 February 2001	East Bengal	6–0	Kasba Samannay	Kolkata

24 February 2001	Nabajanma Sangha	1–0	Young Footballers	Kolkata

27 February 2001	Young Footballers	3–0	Kasba Samannay	Kolkata

28 February 2001	Nabajanma Sangha	3–0	Bidyut Sporting	Kolkata

1 March 2001	East Bengal	0–0	Income Tax	Kolkata

== Knockout stage ==
=== Qualified teams ===
The top four placed teams from each of the two groups qualified for the knockout stage.

Group A	Group B
Mohun Bagan	Income Tax
Jubak Sangha	East Bengal
Bally Gramanchal	Nabajanma Sangha
Itika Memorial	Young Footballers

=== Bracket ===
Quarter-finals
6 March 2001
Mohun Bagan	2
Young Footballers	0
6 March 2001
Nabajanma Sangha	2
Jubak Sangha	0
6 March 2001
Income Tax	3
Itika Memorial	0
6 March 2001
East Bengal	4
Bally Gramanchal	0

Semi-finals
8 March 2001
Mohun Bagan	6
Nabajanma Sangha	0
9 March 2001
Income Tax	0
East Bengal	1

Final
16 March 2001
Mohun Bagan	0
East Bengal	1

=== Quarter-finals ===
Team 1	Score	Team 2
Mohun Bagan	2–0	Young Footballers
Nabajanma Sangha	2–0	Jubak Sangha
Income Tax	3–0	Itika Memorial
East Bengal	4–0	Bally Gramanchal

==== Matches ====
1 March 2001 QF–1	Mohun Bagan	2–0	Young Footballers	Kolkata
	Anjana Kumari (?); Rinku Ghosh (?)	Report

1 March 2001 QF–2	Nabajanma Sangha	2–0	Jubak Sangha	Kolkata
	Madhumita Das (?); Swapna Ghosh (?)	Report

1 March 2001 QF–3	Income Tax	3–0	Itika Memorial	Kolkata
	Pushpa Das (?); Priyanka Kumari (?); Sayanti Nandy (?)	Report

1 March 2001 QF–4	East Bengal	4–0	Bally Gramanchal	Kolkata
	Sujata Kar (?); Swapna Kumari (?)	Report

=== Semi-finals ===
Team 1	Score	Team 2
Mohun Bagan	6–0	Nabajanma Sangha
Income Tax	0–1	East Bengal

==== Matches ====
8 March 2001 SF–1	Mohun Bagan	6–0	Nabajanma Sangha	Kolkata

9 March 2001 SF–2	Income Tax	0–1	East Bengal	Kolkata

=== Final ===
==== Summary ====
The 2001 Calcutta Women's Football League final was held at the Rabindra Sarobar Stadium on 16 March 2001 between Kolkata giants Mohun Bagan and East Bengal, in the very first season of their formation. This match would thus remain recorded as the first-ever women's Kolkata Derby between the two teams. East Bengal women's team clinched the match 1–0 courtesy of a solitary goal from forward Shanta Dhara in the twenty-third minute of the game as East Bengal held onto the lead and lifted their first-ever Calcutta Women's Football League title.

==== Match ====
16 March 2001

Mohun Bagan	0–1	East Bengal
	Report	Shanta Dhara 23'

Rabindra Sarobar Stadium, Kolkata

Mohun Bagan	East Bengal

GK	Ranjita Khan
RB	Maria D'Rebello
CB	Madhu Kumari
CB	Dulali Ghosh
LB	Jayanti Barua
CM	Naushaba Alam		Substituted off
CM	Mausam Kumari		Substituted off
RW	Swati Kumari
LW	Kalpana Sahoo
CF	Anjana Kumari		Substituted off
LF	Rinku Ghosh
Substitutions:
CM	Sanju Kumari	Substituted on
CM	Seema Dey	Substituted on
FW	Papia Ghosh	Substituted on

GK	Namita Bag
RB	Prathama Priyadarshini
CB	Nesha Kumari
CB	Momo Gogoi
LB	Nazda Tabassum
CM	Rajani Alankar
CM	Sharmila Sapui
RW	Swapna Kumari
LW	Sashi Kumari
FW	Sujata Kar
FW	Shanta Dhara
Substitutions:
—

Player of the Match:
Shanta Dhara (East Bengal)

Match rules

- 90 minutes.
- 30 minutes of extra time if necessary.
- Golden goal ends game.
- Penalty shoot-out if scores still level.
- Maximum of three substitutions allowed.
