= 2021–22 Calcutta Women's Football League =

Calcutta Women's Football League
- Season: 2021–22
- Dates: 21 February 2022
- Champions: SSB Women's FC (4th title)
- Promoted: SSB Women's FC
- Best Player: Duler Marandi (SSB Women's)
- Top goalscorer: Mina Khatun (Southern Samity)
- Best goalkeeper: Rani Bhowmik (Kalighat Sports Lovers Association)
- Biggest home win: Chandney FC 18–0 Bidyut SC; SSB Women's FC 18–0 Rampur Milan Sangha

2021–22 Calcutta Women's Football League was the 26th season of the Calcutta Women's Football League, also known as the Kanyashree Cup. SSB Women's won their fourth title in the edition and qualified for the 2021–22 Indian Women's League.

== Teams ==
All participants
Sl No	Teams	Sl No	Teams
1	Sreebhumi FC	12	Kalighat Sporting Lovers Association
2	Dipti Sangha FC	13	New Alipore Suruchi Sangha
3	Sevayani SW Org.	14	Sorojini Naidu OSC
4	Bidyut Sporting Club	15	Maniick Football CC
5	Bally Gramanchal KS	16	Southern Samity
6	WB Police SC	17	Akhil Bharatiya AVP
7	Police AC	18	Jubak Sangha
8	Moitree Sansad	19	United Students Club
9	SSB Women's	20	Invention Football CC
10	Rampur Milan Sangha	21	GC Roy Memorial FC
11	Chandney Sporting Club	22	ASOS Rainbow AC

== Group A ==
Pos	Team	Pld	W	D	L	GF	GA	GD	Pts	Qualification or relegation
1	SSB Womens	4	4	0	0	35	0	+35	12	Qualified for Quarterfinals
2	Chandney FC	4	3	0	1	29	7	+22	9	Qualified for Quarterfinals
3	Sevayani SW Org.	4	2	0	2	3	14	−11	6	
4	Rampur Milan Sangha	4	1	0	3	7	23	−16	3	
5	Bidyut SC	4	0	0	4	2	32	−30	0	

Source: kolkatafootball.com

=== Matches ===
4 March 2022	SSB Womens	18–0	Rampur Milan Sangha	Kolkata
14:00 IST	N Sumila Chanu *3 Dular Marandi; H Ranjita Devi *6 L Julia Devi *3 Sandhya Kacchap			Stadium: SSB 63 Battalion Stadium; MVP: H Ranjita Devi

4 March 2022	Sevayani SW Org.	2–1	Bidyut SC	Kolkata
14:00 IST	Sanjukta Rauth; Koyel Majumdar		Sapriya Mandal	Stadium: Rabindra Sarobar Stadium; MVP: Koyel Majumdar

1 March 2022	Chandney SC	8–0	Sevayani SW Org.	Kolkata
14:30 IST	Birsi Oraon *3 Kumari P *4 Barsha; Own Goal; Aparna			Stadium: Howrah Stadium; MVP: Birsi Oraon

1 March 2022	Bidyut SC	1–6	Rampur Milan Sangha	Kolkata
14:30 IST	Nilima Besra		Sujata Hembram *3 Baisakhi Das; Madhuri Dhara *2	Stadium: Rabindra Sarobar Stadium; MVP: Sujata Hembram

26 February 2022	Chandney FC	3–1	Rampur Milan Sangha	Kolkata
14:30IST	Ratna Haldar *3		Ropni Hansda	Stadium: Rabindra Sarobar Stadium; MVP: Ratna Haldar

26 February 2022	Bidyut Sporting Club	0–6	SSB Women's FC	Kolkata
14:30 IST			Sandhya; NG Anibala; Munesh Kumari; Anita; H Ranjita *2	Stadium: SDDM Stadium (Surer Math); MVP: Priti Patra

24 February 2022	SSB Womens	5–0	Sevayani SW Org.	Kolkata
11:00 IST	Anibala Devi; Ranjita Devi; Sumitra Marandi *2 Monika			Stadium: SSB 63 Battalion Stadium; MVP: Sumitra Marandi

24 February 2022	Chandney FC	18–0	Bidyut SC	Kolkata
11:00IST	Anita Oraon *5 BIrsi Oraon *3 Ratna Haldar *3 Sahamina Khatun *2 Kumari Poli Mandal; PChakraborty; Shibani Mandal *2 Paromita Ghosh			Stadium: SDDM Stadium (Surer Math); MVP: Anita Oraon

22 February 2022	Sevayani SW Org.	1–0	Rampur Milan Sangha	Kolkata
14:30 IST	Sanjukta Rauth			Stadium: SSB 63 Battalion Stadium; MVP: Sanjukta Rauth

21 February 2022	Chandney SC	0–6	SSB Women's FC	Kolkata
15:00 IST			Ranjita Devi *2 Dular Marandi; Munesh Kumari; Purnima Linda; Anita Rani	Stadium: Rabindra Sarobar Stadium

== Group B ==
Pos	Team	Pld	W	D	L	GF	GA	GD	Pts	Qualification or relegation
1	New Alipore Suruchi Sangha	4	4	0	0	30	1	+29	12	Qualified for Quarterfinals
2	Sorojini Naidu OSC	4	3	0	1	17	5	+12	9	Qualified for Quarterfinals
3	Manick Football CC	4	2	0	2	10	12	−2	6	
4	United SC	4	1	0	3	6	18	−12	3	
5	Jubak Sangha	4	0	0	4	2	29	−27	0	

Source: kolkatafootball.com

=== Matches ===
4 March 2022	Sorojini Naidu OSC	6–0	Jubak Sangha	Kolkata
14:00IST	Rimpa Haldar *4 Riya Haldar; Suparna Das			Stadium: Aditya Academy; MVP: Rimpa Haldar

4 March 2022	Manick Football CC	4–1	United SC	Kolkata
14:00 IST	Rajani Bouri; Banya Khatun; Pritha Das; Pratiksha Hati		Kanika Das	Stadium: Howrah Stadium; MVP: Rajani Bouri

1 March 2022	United Students Club	3–2	Jubak Sangah	Kolkata
14:30 IST	Kanika Das *2 Sharjida Khatun		Shanti Munda	Stadium: Aditya Academy

1 March 2022	New Alipore Suruchi Sangha	6–0	Manick Football CC	Kolkata
14:30 IST	Deblina Bhattacharya *3 Mariyam Khatun *2 Rakhi Kashap			Stadium: SSB 63 Battalion Stadium; MVP: Deblina Bhattacharya

26 February 2022	New Alipore Suruchi Sangha	15–0	Jubak Sangha	Kolkata
11:00 IST	Deblina Bhattacharya *6 Riya Duley *2 Trisha Mallick *3 Rakhi Kachap; Piyali Kora; Parbati Oraw; Mariyam Khatun			Stadium: Rabindra Sarobar Stadium; MVP: Deblina Bhattacharya

26 February 2022	United Students Club	1–6	Sorojini Naidu OSC	Kolkata
11:00 IST	Sharjida Khatun		Rimpa Haldar *3 Suparna Das; Ikta Chaterjee; Riya Haldar	Stadium: SDDM Stadium (Surer Math); MVP: Rimpa Haldar

24 February 2022	Sorojini Naidu OSC	5–1	Manick Football CC	Kolkata
14:30IST	Rimpa Haldar *4 Suranjana Lohar		Niyati Hansda	Stadium: Rabindra Sarobar Stadium; MVP: Rimpa Haldar

24 February 2022	New Alipore Suruchi Sangha	6–1	United Students Club	Kolkata
14:30 IST	Anisha Khatoon *2 Trisha Malick; Maria Bencley; Riya Duley; Mariyam Khatun		Munna Haldar	Stadium: SDDM Stadium (Surer Math); MVP: Anisha Khatoon

22 February 2022	Manick Football CC	5–0	Jubak Sangha	Kolkata
14:30 IST	Banya Khatun *2 Rajani Bouri; Pritilata Mahato; Mou Sarkar			Stadium: SDDM Stadium (Surer Math); MVP: Rajani Bouri

22 February 2022	New Alipore Suruchi Sangha	3–0	Sarojini Naidu OSC	Kolkata
14:30 IST	Trisha Malick; Mariyam Khatun; Deblina Bhatacharjee			Stadium: Rabindra Sarobar Stadium; MVP: Mariyam Khatun

== Group C ==
Pos	Team	Pld	W	D	L	GF	GA	GD	Pts	Qualification or relegation
1	Kalighat Sports Lovers Association	5	5	0	0	39	2	+37	15	Qualified for Quarterfinals
2	Southern Samity	5	4	0	1	33	2	+31	12	Qualified for Quarterfinals
3	ASOS Rainbow AC	5	3	0	2	27	4	+23	9	
4	GC Roy Memorial	5	2	0	3	11	22	−11	6	
5	Invention Football CC	5	1	0	4	8	34	−26	3	
6	Akhil Bharatiya AVP	5	0	0	5	0	54	−54	0	

Source: kolkatafootball.com

=== Matches ===
5 March 2022	GC Roy Memorial	5–1	Invention Football CC	Kolkata
11:00 IST	Jaba Roy; Bimala Biswakarma; Srestra Deb; Mamoni Deb *2		Dipika Naskar	Stadium: SSDM Stadium (Surer Math)

5 March 2022	Kalighat Sports Lovers Association	3–2	ASOS Rainbow AC	Kolkata
11:00 IST	Namita *2 Singo Murmu		Sanjana; Malavika P	Stadium: Howrah Stadium

5 March 2022	Southern Samity	14–0	Akhil Bharatiya AVP	Kolkata
11:00 IST	Mina Khatun *6 Payel Sardar; Priya Rui Das; Aishwarya Jagtap; Riya Sukhdeb *2 Sathi Debnath; Nisha Tiwari			Stadium: Rabindra Sarobar Stadium

3 March 2022	GC Roy Memorial	6–0	Akhil Bharatiya AVP	Kolkata
14:00 IST	Mamani Das *3 Sneha Rasbhar; Mulang Koha; Soshna Rai			Stadium: SSB 63 Battalion Stadium; MVP: Mamani Das

3 March 2022	Kalighat Sports Lovers Association	2–0	Southern Samity	Kolkata
14:00 IST	Kabita; Sushmita Bardhan			Stadium: Howrah Stadium; MVP: Sushmita Bardhan

3 March 2022	ASOS Rainbow AC	8–0	Invention Football CC	Kolkata
14:00 IST	Malabika P *2 Bandana; Supriya; Sanjana *4			Stadium: Aditya Academy; MVP: Malabika P

28 February 2022	ASOS Rainbow AC	0–1	Southern Samity	Kolkata
11:00 IST			Own Goal	Stadium: Rabindra Sarobar Stadium

28 February 2022	Kalighat Sports Lovers Association	8–0	GC Roy Memorial	Kolkata
11:00 IST	Sushmita Bardhan *3 Singo Murmu *4 Namita		Rubina Khatun	Stadium: Howrah Stadium

28 February 2022	Invention CC	7–0	Akhil Bhartiya AVP	Kolkata
11:00 IST	Neha *3 Ipsita; Kanika *2 Dipika			Stadium: SSB 63 Battalion Stadium

26 February 2022	ASOS Rainbow AC	12–0	Akhil Bhartiya AVP	Kolkata
14:30 IST	Sanjana *3 Pemayanchen; Rrupapati; Malabika P *3 Supria; Piyali; Bandana; Milita			Stadium: SSB 63 Battalion Stadium; MVP: Malabika P

25 February 2022	Kalighat Sports Lovers Association	11–0	Invention Fc	Kolkata
14:30 IST	Sombari Hembram *3 Singo Murmu *2 Anjali Soren; Sushmita Bardhan *3 Rani Bhowmick		Rubina Khatun	Stadium: SDDM Stadium (Surer Math)

25 February 2022	Southern Samity	8–0	GC Roy Memorial	Kolkata
14:30 IST	Gita Das; Aishwarya Jagtap *2 Milna Khatun *4 Shila Bagti			Stadium: Rabindra Sarobar Stadium

23 February 2022	ASOS Rainbow AC	5–0	GC Roy Memorial FC	Kolkata
11:00 IST	Sanjana; Yangchen; Malabika P *2 Pemayanchen			Stadium: SSB 63 Battalion Stadium; MVP: Malabika P

23 February 2022	Akhil Bharatiya AVP	0–15	Kalighat Sports Lovers Association	Kolkata
11:00 IST			Sombari *3 Sushmita*2; Singo Murmu*4; Anjali; Kabita; Rani *2 Pujari	Stadium: SDDM Stadium (Surer Math); MVP: Singo Murmu

23 February 2022	Invention Football CC	0–10	Southern Samity	Kolkata
11:00 IST	Own Goal		Sathi; Shivani; GIta*2; Barnali*3; Mina; Durgamoti	Stadium: Rabindra Sarobar Stadium; MVP: Barnali Karar

== Group D ==
Pos	Team	Pld	W	D	L	GF	GA	GD	Pts	Qualification or relegation
1	Sreebhumi FC	5	4	0	1	28	1	+27	12	Qualified for Quarterfinals
2	WB Police	4	3	1	0	10	2	+8	10	Qualified for Quarterfinals
3	Moitri Sangsad	5	3	1	1	13	5	+8	10	
4	Police AC	4	1	0	3	13	10	+3	3	
5	Bally Gramanchal KS	2	0	0	2	0	13	−13	0	
6	Dipti Sangha	4	0	0	4	3	36	−33	0	

Source: kolkatafootball.com

=== Matches ===
5 March 2022	Sreebhumi FC	13–0	Dipti Sangha	Kolkata
14:30 IST	Tulsi Hembram *8 Mamta Hansda *4 Jyoti Sharma			Stadium: Rabindra Sarobar Stadium; MVP: Tulsi Hembram

5 March 2022	WB Police FC	1–1	Moitri Sansad	Kolkata
14:30 IST	Sandhya Maity		Sainur Khatun	Stadium: SDDM Stadium (Surer Math)

2 March 2022	Sreebhumi FC	5–0	Police AC	Kolkata
11:00 IST	Bideshi Soren; Mamata; Dolly; Mina; Mamta			Stadium: Rabindra Sarobar Stadium; MVP: Bideshi Soren

2 March 2022	Dipti Sangha	2–4	Moitri Sangsad	Kolkata
11:00 IST	Baisakhi; Sangita		Usha Bagti *2 Sainur Khatun *2	Stadium: Aditya Academy; MVP: Usha Bagti

28 February 2022	WB Police	2–0	Police AC	Kolkata
14:30 IST	Rubina *2			Stadium: Rabindra Sarobar Stadium

28 February 2022	Sreebhumi FC	2–0	Moitri Sangsad	Kolkata
14:30 IST	Mina Khatun; Tulsi Hembram			Stadium: SSB 63 Battalion Stadium

26 February 2022	Bally Gramanchal KS	0–5	Moitri Sangsad	Kolkata
11:00 IST			Sainur Khatun *2 Pinki Bagti *3	Stadium: Howrah Stadium

25 February 2022	Police AC	13–0	Dipti Sangha	Kolkata
11:00 IST	Kusum Chetri *2 Dipsama Thapa *5 Pinki Roy *5 Lipika Adak		Niyati Hansda	Stadium: SDDM Stadium (Surer Math)

25 February 2022	Sreebhumi FC	0–1	WB Police	Kolkata
11:00 IST			Rubina Khatun	Stadium: Rabindra Sarobar Stadium; MVP: Rubina Khatun

23 February 2022	WB Police FC	6–1	Dipti Sangha	Kolkata
14:30 IST	Sandhya Maity *5 Sabina Khatun		Sangita Mahato	Stadium: SSB 63 Battalion Stadium; MVP: Sandhya Maity

23 February 2022	Police AC	0–3	Moitri Sansad	Kolkata
14:30 IST			Sainur Khatun *3	Stadium: Rabindra Sarobar Stadium; MVP: Sainur Khatun

23 February 2022	Sreebhumi FC	8–0	Bally Gramanchal KS	Kolkata
14:30 IST	Tulsi Hembram *2 Kabita Hembram *2 Jyoti Sharma; Mamta Hansda*2; Mamta Mahato			Stadium: SDDM Stadium (Surer Math); MVP: Mamta Hansda

== Quarterfinals ==
11 March 2022 Quarterfinal 1	Kalighat SLA	5–4	Sarojini Naidu OSC	Kolkata
: IST	Sushmita Bardhan *2 Singo Murmu *2 Sonamoni Soren		Rimpa Haldar *4

11 March 2022 Quarterfinal 2	SSB Women	2–1	Sreebhumi FC	Kolkata
: IST	Dular Marandi *2		Meena Khatun

12 March 2022 Quarterfinal 3	Southern Samity	4–1	New Alipore Suruchi Sangha	Kolkata
: IST	Dular Marandi *2 Sathi Debnath *2 Mina Khatun; Barnali Karar		Deblina Bhattacharya

12 March 2022 Quarterfinal 4	Chandney Sporting	0–0 (5–6 p)	West Bengal Police	Kolkata
: IST

== Semifinals ==
16 March 2022 Semifinal 1	SSB Women's FC	4–1	Kalighat Sports Lovers Association	Kolkata
14:15 IST	Munesh Kumari *2 Ranjita Devi; Anibala Devi		Sonamoni Soren	Stadium: SDDM Stadium (Surer Math); MVP: Munesh Kumari

17 March 2022 Semifinal 2	Southern Samity	4–1	WB Police SC	Kolkata
14:15 IST	Mina Khatun*2; Shivani Toppo; Riya Sukhdeve		Sonamoni Soren	Stadium: SDDM Stadium (Surer Math); MVP: Kajal Das

== Finals ==
22 March 2022 Final	SSB Women's FC	1–0	Southern Samity	Kolkata
16:30 IST	Ranjita Devi	Report		Stadium: Kishore Bharati Stadium; Referee: Kanika Barman; MVP: Ranjita Devi

== Season awards ==
The following awards were announced at the end of the season:

- Player of the Tournament: Dular Marandi (SSB Women FC)
- Highest Goalscorer: Mina Khatun (Southern Samity)
- Best Goalkeeper: Rani Bhowmick (Kalighat Sports Lovers Assn)
