= SAFF Women's Club Championship =

Association football tournament in South Asia

- Organiser(s): SAFF
- Founded: 25 May 2025; 8 months ago
- Region: South Asia
- Teams: 5 (from 1 sub-confederation)
- Current champions: (India) East Bengal (1st title)
- Most championships: (India) East Bengal (1 title)
- Website: saffederation.org
- 2025 SAFF Women's Club Championship

The SAFF Women's Club Championship, also known as the Vatsalya SAFF Women's Club Championship for sponsorship reasons, is a biennial football tournament for women's clubs in South Asia. Organized by the South Asian Football Federation (SAFF), the tournament is open to clubs from its seven member associations. The inaugural edition was held in Kathmandu, from 5 to 20 December 2025.

== Results ==
SAFF Women's Club Championship editions
| Edition | Year | Winners | Result | Runners-up | Final venue | No. of teams |
|---|---|---|---|---|---|---|
| 1 | 2025 | (India) East Bengal | 3–0 | (Nepal) APF | Dasharath Rangasala, Kathmandu | 5 |

== Records and statistics ==
=== Performances by club ===
Performances in the SAFF Women's Club Championship by club
| Club | Winners | Runners-up | Years won | Years runners-up |
|---|---|---|---|---|
| (India) East Bengal | 1 | 0 | 2025 | — |
| (Nepal) APF | 0 | 1 | — | 2025 |

=== Performances by nation ===
Performances in the SAFF Women's Club Championship by nation
| Nation | Winners | Runners-up |
|---|---|---|
| India | 1 | 0 |
| Nepal | 0 | 1 |

=== Top scorers by year ===
| Year | Player | Club | Goals | Ref. |
|---|---|---|---|---|
| 2025 | (Uganda) Fazila Ikwaput | (India) East Bengal | 9 | |

== Prize money ==
Starting with the 2025 season, the distribution of the prize money is as follows.

- Group stage: $2,000
- Runners-up: $5,000
- Champions: $10,000

== See also ==
- AFC Women's Champions League
- WAFF Women's Clubs Championship
