= Women's IFA Shield =

Association football tournament in India

- Organiser(s): Indian Football Association (West Bengal)
- Founded: 2023; 3 years ago
- Region: India (West Bengal)
- Teams: 6
- Current champions: East Bengal (1st title)
- Most championships: East Bengal (1 time)
- 2023

The Women's IFA Shield is a women's football cup competition organised by the Indian Football Association in West Bengal. The inaugural edition was held in 2023 and was won by East Bengal.

== Formation ==
This tournament started on 25 May 2023 with six teams participating in the inaugural edition. The matches were held at Tehatta Stadium in Tehatta and Krishnanagar Stadium, Krishnanagar in the Nadia district. The first match was played between East Bengal and Nadia DSA.

=== 2023 Teams ===
- East Bengal
- Sreebhumi
- Mohammedan Sporting
- Chandney SC
- WB Police
- Nadia DSA

== Results ==
Year	Winners	Score	Runners-up	Venue	Ref
2023	East Bengal	5–0	Sreebhumi	Tehatta Stadium, Nadia	
