= Kanyashree Cup =

Women's football tournament in West Bengal, India

Calcutta Women's Football League
- Organising body: Indian Football Association (West Bengal)
- Founded: 1993; 33 years ago
- Country: India
- Divisions: 2
- Number of clubs: 16
- Level on pyramid: 3–4
- Promotion to: Indian Women's League 2
- Domestic cup: Women's IFA Shield
- Current champions: East Bengal (4th title) (2025–26)
- Most championships: Income Tax; SSB Women; East Bengal (4 titles each)
- Broadcaster(s): IFA TV (YouTube, Facebook)
- Current: 2025–26

The Calcutta Women's Football League, also known as the Kanyashree Cup, is a women's football league in the Indian state of West Bengal. Founded in 1993, it is the oldest women's football league in India and organised by Indian Football Association (IFA), the official football governing body in the state. The tournament is primarily participated by teams across Kolkata.

== History ==
The Calcutta Women's Football League was founded by Indian Football Association (IFA) in 1993 to introduce women's football in West Bengal in the lines of men's domestic football system. The inaugural edition was won by an institutional team of Income Tax Department against Behala Aikya Sammilani. Due to lack of sufficient resources and reception towards women's football in the nation, the organising body either cancelled or organised the tournament in small scale for the following years, thereby leaving negligible data about the tournament during the period.

The popularity considerably rose when the two big clubs of Bengal—East Bengal and Mohun Bagan—formed their respective women's teams to participate in the competition. Both the teams would reach the finals for two consecutive years, with East Bengal winning in 2001 and Mohun Bagan in 2002. But, considering no national level honours to fight for, the two clubs found it financially unprofitable to maintain a women's football division, thus East Bengal disbanded it in 2003 and Mohun Bagan in 2004. During this period, the only team to continue their dominance was Income Tax. After years of discontinuation of the competition, it was started once again in 2017. The following year was won by another institutional team – Sashastra Seema Bal (SSB). This was the first edition of Calcutta Women's Football League where the winner was given a chance to qualify for Indian Women's League.

In 2020 the tournament was renamed to Kanyashree Cup under the patronage of the state Chief Minister Mamata Banerjee. East Bengal once again formed its women's team to participate and reached the finals where they lost against SSB, who became the second team after Income Tax to win three consecutive finals. The 2021 edition did not take place due to COVID-19 pandemic and in the following edition, due to management disputes, East Bengal informed IFA about not participating. SSB continued their dominance by defeating the women's team of Southern Samity. In 2022, East Bengal once again formed their women's team and went on to win the Kanyashree Cup for the second time after 2001, winning all the matches and defeating Sreebhumi in the final.

In 2024, a new second division was formed known as Kanyashree Cup Premier Division B, with 15 clubs participating for the season.

== League structure ==
Calcutta Women's Football League
Tier	Division
I _{(3 on Indian Women's Football Pyramid)}	Premier Division A
II _{(4 on Indian Women's Football Pyramid)}	Premier Division B

== Champions of CWFL top division ==
Season	Champion	Runners-up
1993	Income Tax	Behala Aikya Sammilani
1994	No data	
1995	No data	
1996	No data	
1997	No data	
1998	No data	
1999	No data	
2000	Itika Memorial	Income Tax
2001	East Bengal	Mohun Bagan
2002	Mohun Bagan	East Bengal
2003	Income Tax	Mohun Bagan
2004	Income Tax	Sarojini Naidu Club
2005	Income Tax	Sarojini Naidu Club
2006	Friends of the Stadium	Income Tax
2007	No data	
2008	No data	
2009	No data	
2010	No data	
2011	No data	
2012	No data	
2013	No data	
2014	Not held	
2015	Not held	
2016	Not held	
2017	Taltala Dipti Sangha	No data
2018	SSB	No data
2019	SSB	Sreebhumi
2020–21	SSB	East Bengal
2021–22	SSB	Southern Samity
2022–23	East Bengal	Sreebhumi
2023–24	Sreebhumi	East Bengal
2024–25	East Bengal	Sreebhumi
2025–26	East Bengal	United Kolkata

== Kanyashree Cup Premier Division A ==
Kanyashree Cup Premier Division A
- Organising bodies: Indian Football Association (West Bengal)
- Country: India
- Level on pyramid: 1 (state); 3 (National)
- Promotion to: Indian Women's League 2
- Relegation to: Premier Division B
- Current champions: East Bengal (4th title) (2025–26)
- Current: 2025–26

Kanyashree Cup Premier Division A is the top-tier women's state level football league in the Indian state of West Bengal. It was instituted in 2024, with a new second division known as Premier Division B.

== Kanyashree Cup Premier Division B ==
Kanyashree Cup Premier Division B
- Organising bodies: Indian Football Association (West Bengal)
- Country: India
- Number of clubs: 15
- Level on pyramid: 2 (state); 4 (National)
- Promotion to: Premier Division A
- Current champions: Share Academy Invention FCC (1st title) (2025–26)
- Current: 2025–26

Kanyashree Cup Premier Division B is the 2nd tier women's state level football league in the Indian state of West Bengal.

Season	Champion	Runners-up
2023–24	SSB	Dipti Sangha FC
2024–25	United Kolkata SC	Police AC
2025–26	Share Academy Invention FCC	Rampur Milan Sangha

== See also ==
- Women's football in India
- Football in India
