= 2025 International Women's Championship squads =

List of players competing at the 1st edition of the International Women's Championship

This article lists the squads for the 2025 International Women's Championship, the inaugural edition of the International Women's Championship. The cup consisted of a series of friendly games, and was held in Nepal from 17 to 26 February 2025. The four national teams involved in the tournament could register a 23 player squad.

The age listed for each player is on 17 February 2025, the first day of the tournament. The numbers of caps and goals listed for each player do not include any matches played after the start of tournament. The club listed is the club for which the player last played a competitive match prior to the tournament. The nationality for each club reflects the national association (not the league) to which the club is affiliated. A flag is included for coaches that are of a different nationality than their own national team.

== Squads ==
=== Kyrgyzstan ===
Coach: Nematzhan Zakirov

The final squad was announced on 14 February 2025.

No.	Pos.	Player	Date of birth (age)	Club
1	GK	Dilnaz Zhenishbek Kyzy		
2	DF	Diana Nurbekova		
3	DF	Damira Daiyrbekova		
4	DF	Ulara Kachibekova		
5	FW	Adelia Akmatbekova		
6	MF	Meerim Karamurzaeva		
7	DF	Nagima Turalieva		
8	MF	Aikhan Termes		
9	FW	Ademi Bakytbekova		
10	FW	Tatiana Kaznacheeva		
11	FW	Asem Turgumbaeva		
12	MF	Myrzaiym Dzhuzubakhunova		
13	GK	Violetta Dudochkina		
14	MF	Alina Gaparova		
15	MF	Ulara Dzhushebaeva		
16	GK	Dilnura Abibulla Kyzy	10 December 2002 (aged 22)	(Kazakhstan) Tomiris-Turan
17	MF	Aiana Karataeva		
18	DF	Adelaida Myrzalieva		
19	MF	Medina Nurlan Kyzy		
20	MF	Zhibek Kanatbekova		
21	MF	Gulniza Anarbekova		
22	FW	Anna Zarodina		
23	DF	Karina Kostiuk		

=== Lebanon ===
Coach: Wael Gharzeddine

The final squad was announced on 12 February 2025.

No.	Pos.	Player	Date of birth (age)	Caps	Goals	Club
1	GK	Clara Khalil	28 May 2004 (aged 20)	2	0	(Lebanon) Jounieh
2	DF	Julie Atallah	28 July 2005 (aged 19)	13	0	(France) FCPSL
3	DF	Dima Al Kasti	13 December 2001 (aged 23)	23	4	(Lebanon) No Limits
4	DF	Tiana Jaber	9 May 2000 (aged 24)	0	0	(New Zealand) Wellington Phoenix
5	DF	Waed Raed	9 November 2006 (aged 18)	21	1	(Lebanon) ÓBerytus
6	MF	Nathalie Matar (captain)	20 September 1995 (aged 29)	26	0	(France) USPSO
7	FW	Pilar Khoury	25 August 1994 (aged 30)	8	3	(France) Strasbourg
8	MF	Anabelle Ghabach	11 October 2005 (aged 19)	0	0	(Australia) APIA Leichhardt
9	FW	Lili Iskandar	16 May 2002 (aged 22)	24	12	(Saudi Arabia) Al-Ittihad
10	FW	Christy Maalouf	20 December 2005 (aged 19)	21	10	(France) VGA Saint-Maur
11	MF	Syntia Salha	12 January 2003 (aged 22)	26	7	(Cyprus) Lakatamia
12	MF	Mya Mehanna	16 November 2006 (aged 18)	0	0	(Australia) Bulls FC Academy
14	FW	Leah El Hajj Ali	4 June 2008 (aged 16)	2	0	(Lebanon) BFA
15	MF	Paula Karam	20 September 2007 (aged 17)	1	0	(Lebanon) Jounieh
16	DF	Farah El Tayar	10 December 2003 (aged 21)	4	1	(United States) FIU Panthers
17	MF	Tatianna Kanaan	9 February 2007 (aged 18)	0	0	(Lebanon) Salam Zgharta
18	DF	Karly Harfouche	3 August 2004 (aged 20)	5	0	(United States) Bethel Pilots
19	FW	Sherin Hasno	25 March 2007 (aged 17)	0	0	(Denmark) HB Køge U19
20	MF	Zahwa Arabi	2 November 2005 (aged 19)	19	2	Free agent
21	DF	Ayana Rezkallah	21 April 2008 (aged 16)	2	0	(Lebanon) EFP
22	GK	Nour Hammoudy	8 March 2007 (aged 17)	0	0	(Lebanon) BFA
23	GK	Marcelle Skaiki	1 February 2007 (aged 18)	0	0	(Lebanon) No Limits

=== Myanmar ===
Coach: (Japan) Tetsuro Uki

The final squad was announced on 13 February 2025.

No.	Pos.	Player	Date of birth (age)	Club
1	GK	Ei Sandar Zaw	15 February 2000 (aged 25)	(Myanmar) Myawady
2	DF	May Thet Mon Myint	28 November 2004 (aged 20)	(Myanmar) Thitsar Arman
3	DF	Yu Yu Naing	29 November 2007 (aged 17)	(Myanmar) Yangon United
4	DF	Zune Yu Ya Oo	12 February 2001 (aged 24)	(Myanmar) Ayeyawady United
5	DF	Phyu Phyu Win	1 December 2004 (aged 20)	(Myanmar) Myawady
6	MF	Naw Htet Htet Wai	30 July 2000 (aged 24)	(Myanmar) Ayeyawady United
7	FW	Win Theingi Tun	1 February 1995 (aged 30)	(Malaysia) Sabah
8	FW	San Thaw Thaw	9 January 2001 (aged 24)	(Myanmar) Ayeyawady United
9	MF	Khin Mo Mo Tun	3 June 1999 (aged 25)	(Myanmar) ISPE
10	MF	Khin Marlar Tun	21 September 1989 (aged 35)	(Myanmar) ISPE
11	MF	Yu Per Khine	31 January 1996 (aged 29)	(Myanmar) Myawady
12	DF	Sandar Lin		(Myanmar) Thitsar Arman
13	FW	May Htet Lu	29 January 2003 (aged 22)	(United States) Pierce College Brahmas
14	DF	Lin Lae Oo		(Myanmar) ISPE
15	MF	Yin Loon Eain	21 March 2006 (aged 18)	(Myanmar) ISPE
16	DF	Than Than Nwe		(Myanmar) ISPE
17	MF	Lin Myint Mo	9 June 2002 (aged 22)	(Myanmar) ISPE
18	GK	Zu Latt Nadi	22 February 2000 (aged 24)	(Myanmar) ISPE
19	FW	Shwe Yee Tun	14 May 2003 (aged 21)	(Myanmar) ISPE
20	FW	Myat Noe Khin	24 July 2003 (aged 21)	(Myanmar) Thitsar Arman
21	FW	Yoon Wadi Hlaing	9 September 2005 (aged 19)	(Myanmar) Yangon United
22	GK	Myo Mya Mya Nyein	28 November 1999 (aged 25)	(Myanmar) Thitsar Arman
23	DF	Khin Myo Thandar Tun		(Myanmar) Shan United

=== Nepal ===
Coach: Rajendra Tamang

The final squad was announced on 14 February 2025.

No.	Pos.	Player	Date of birth (age)	Club
1	GK	Usha Nath	23 January 2001 (aged 24)	Nepal Police
2	DF	Puja Rana	28 March 2001 (aged 23)	Nepal Police
3	DF	Bimala B.K.	23 January 2002 (aged 23)	Nepal Army
4	DF	Samikshya Ghimire	26 December 1999 (aged 25)	Nepal Police
5	DF	Amrita Jaisi	15 October 1994 (aged 30)	Nepal Police
6	DF	Man Maya Damai	13 September 2004 (aged 20)	(Nepal) APF
7	MF	Renuka Nagarkote	16 April 1995 (aged 29)	(Nepal) APF
8	MF	Saru Limbu	6 March 1999 (aged 25)	(Nepal) APF
9	FW	Sabitra Bhandari	2 May 1996 (aged 28)	(France) Guingamp
10	FW	Rashmi Kumari Ghising	15 June 2002 (aged 22)	(Nepal) APF
11	MF	Anita Basnet	9 February 1994 (aged 31)	(Nepal) APF
12	DF	Gita Rana	21 September 1996 (aged 28)	(Nepal) APF
13	FW	Rekha Poudel	7 January 2001 (aged 24)	(United Arab Emirates) Abu Dhabi Country Club
14	MF	Preeti Rai	20 November 2004 (aged 20)	(Nepal) APF
15	FW	Anita K.C.	5 January 1997 (aged 28)	(Nepal) APF
16	GK	Anjila Tumbapo Subba (Captain)	28 May 1996 (aged 28)	(Greece) Nees Atromitou
17	DF	Bimala Chaudhary	1 March 1997 (aged 27)	Nepal Army
18	MF	Sabita Rana Magar	7 July 2003 (aged 21)	(Nepal) APF
19	FW	Chandra Bhandari	5 January 1997 (aged 28)	Nepal Army
20	GK	Anjana Rana Magar	17 January 2002 (aged 23)	Nepal Army
21	DF	Nisha Thokar	1 February 2001 (aged 24)	(Nepal) APF
22	MF	Saraswati Hamal	7 March 2004 (aged 20)	(Nepal) APF
23	MF	Sushma Tamang		(Nepal) Waling Municipality

== Player representation ==
=== By club ===
Clubs with 3 or more players represented are listed.

Players	Club(s)
11	(Nepal) APF
8	(Myanmar) ISPE
4	(Myanmar) Thitsar Arman, Nepal Army, Nepal Police
3	(Myanmar) Ayeyawady United, (Myanmar) Myawady

=== By club nationality ===
Players	Club(s)
21	Myanmar
20	Nepal
9	Lebanon
5	France
3	United States
3	Australia
1	Cyprus, Denmark, Greece, Malaysia, New Zealand, Saudi Arabia, United Arab Emirates

=== By club federation ===
Players	Federation
55	AFC
8	UEFA
3	CONCACAF
1	OFC

=== By representatives of domestic league ===
Players	National squad
21	Myanmar
20	Nepal
9	Lebanon
