= 2025–26 ANFA Women's League =

ANFA Women's League
- Season: 2025–26
- Dates: 18 March 2026 –
- Matches: 4
- Goals: 23 (5.75 per match)
- All statistics correct as of 20 March 2026. 14 clubs participated in League Qualifiers

The 2025–26 ANFA Women's League marks the 2nd edition of Nepal's premier women's football competition. Organized by the All Nepal Football Association (ANFA), this season features an expanded qualification model with 14 clubs, aimed at broadening regional participation and raising the overall competitive standard.

Later Waling Municipality pulled out from the league due to financial issues.

== Qualification ==
2025 ANFA Women's League Qualification was the second edition of qualification tournament organized by All Nepal Football Association. Initially 16(9 teams more than previous edition) Clubs registered for the tournament but later, 2 teams withdrew and 14 teams competing for five spots in the final stage of 2025–26 ANFA Women's League/

=== Clubs ===
Club	City	Province
Butwal Lumbini	Butwal	Lumbini
Chhahari Yuwa Club	Gokarneshwor	Bagmati
Church Boys United	Lalitpur	Bagmati
FC Reale	Madhyapur Thimi	Bagmati
Jhapa FC	Jhapa	Koshi
Lamki Football and Training Center	Lamkichuha	Sudurpashchim
Pokhara Girl's FC	Pokhara	Gandaki
Nepal Khelkud Club	Chandrapur	Madhesh
New Road Team	Kathmandu	Bagmati
Rapti Football Club		Karnali
RS Resort and Beach FC	Pokhara	Gandaki
Sankata FC	Kathmandu	Bagmati
Sindhupalchok Football Club	Chautara	Bagmati
Students' Football Club	Gokarneshwor	Bagmati

=== Group A ===
Pos	Team	Pld	W	D	L	GF	GA	GD	Pts	Qualification
1	Church Boys United	6	5	0	1	24	5	+19	15	Qualified for ANFA Women's League
2	RS Resort and Beach	6	5	0	1	20	7	+13	15	Qualified for ANFA Women's League
3	Rapti Football Club	6	4	1	1	15	2	+13	13	Qualified For ANFA Women's League Playoff
4	Chhahari Football Club	6	3	1	2	14	9	+5	10	
5	Students' Football Club	6	2	0	4	8	24	−16	6	
6	Sindhupalchok Football Club	6	0	1	5	7	22	−15	1	
7	FC Reale	6	0	1	5	3	22	−19	1	

Source: Hamro Khelkud
Rules for classification: 1) Points; 2) Goal difference; 3) Goals scored; 4) head-to-head.

=== Group B ===
Pos	Team	Pld	W	D	L	GF	GA	GD	Pts	Qualification
1	Sankata FC	6	5	1	0	20	2	+18	16	Qualified for ANFA Women's League
2	New Road Team	6	4	1	1	20	5	+15	13	Qualified for ANFA Women's League
3	Jhapa FC	6	4	0	2	13	7	+6	12	Qualified For ANFA Women's League Playoff
4	Nepal Khelkud Club	6	3	1	2	19	5	+14	10	
5	Butwal Lumbini	6	2	0	4	5	13	−8	6	
6	Lamki F&TC	6	0	2	4	3	16	−13	2	
7	Pokhara Girls FC	6	0	1	5	1	33	−32	1	

Source: Hamro Khelkud
Rules for classification: 1) Points; 2) Goal difference; 3) Goals scored; 4) head-to-head.

=== Playoff ===
8 September 2025
15:30 NST

Rapti Football Club	0−1	Jhapa FC

Chyasal Stadium, Lalitpur

== Teams ==
=== Stadiums and locations ===
The season will be made up of five teams that participated in the 2024 Super League, along with five additional top 5 teams that advanced through the qualification process.

Club	City	Province	Stadium	Capacity
APF FC	Kathmandu	Bagmati Province	Halchowk Stadium	5,000
Nepal Police	Kathmandu	Bagmati Province	Nepal Police Football Ground, Naxal	1,500
New Road Team	Kathmandu	Bagmati Province	Dasarath Rangasala	15,000
Sankata FC	Kathmandu	Bagmati Province	Dasarath Rangasala	15,000
Tribhuvan Army	Kathmandu	Bagmati Province	Tribhuwan Army Stadium, Bhadrakali	2,000
Church Boys United	Lalitpur	Bagmati Province	Chyasal Stadium	10,000
Bagmati Youth Club	Bagmati, Sarlahi	Madhesh Province	Bagmati Club Football Ground	5,000
Jhapa FC	Jhapa	Koshi Province	Domalal Rajbanshi Ground	10,000
RS Resort and Beach Football Club	Pokhara, Kaski	Gandaki Province	Pokhara Rangasala	18,500

=== Personnel and Sponsorships ===
Team	Head Coach	Captain	Kit Manufacturer	Shirt Sponsor
APF FC	(Nepal) Jibesh Kumar Pandey	(Nepal) Anita Basnet	Kelme	
Bagmati Youth Club	(Nepal) Arjun Kumar Chaudhury	(Nepal) Sanima Maya Lo		
Church Boys United	(Nepal) Bikram Maharjan	(Nepal) Sarita Kumari Nath		
Jhapa FC	(Nepal) Sandesh Kumar Shrestha	(Nepal) Sunkala Rai	G-Sports	Top Mind Brain
New Road Team	(Nepal) Bijay Maharjan	(Nepal) Pratikshya Thakuri	Kelme	Nagarkot Resort
Nepal Police FC	(Nepal) Bhola Nath Silwal	(Nepal) Amrita Jaishi	Kelme	
RS Resort and Beach Football Club	(Nepal) Suman Shrestha	(Nepal) Gita Shrestha		
Sankata FC	(Nepal) Rabindra Silakar	(Nepal) Yashoda Shahi	G-Sports	Skyworth
Tribhuvan Army FC	(Nepal) Raju Tamang	(Nepal) Sunita Kumari Chaudhary	Li-Ning	

== Foreign players ==
ANFA allowed maximum of four foreign players per team and all four can be part of starting 11.

Team	Player 1	Player 2	Player 3	Player 4	Former players
APF FC	—	—	—	—	—
Bagmati Youth Club	—	—	—	—	—
Church Boys United	—	—	—	—	—
Jhapa FC	(Bangladesh) Sanjida Akhter	—	—	—	—
New Road Team	—	—	—	—	—
Nepal Police FC	—	—	—	—	—
RS Resort and Beach Football Club	—	—	—	—	—
Sankata FC	(Myanmar) Win Theingi Tun	(Ghana) Dora Boatemaa	(Mozambique) Lúcia Leila	(Ghana) Queenabel Akosua Amankrah	—
Tribhuvan Army FC	—	—	—	—	—

== Venues ==
Nepal

Kathmandu	Lalitpur	
Dasarath Rangasala	Chyasal Stadium	ANFA Complex
Capacity: 20,000	Capacity: 10,000	Capacity: 6,000

== League table ==
Pos	Team	Pld	W	D	L	GF	GA	GD	Pts	Qualification
1	Nepal Police	1	1	0	0	5	0	+5	3	Qualified for Super League
2	Tribhuvan Army	1	1	0	0	5	0	+5	3	Qualified for Super League
3	Sankata	1	1	0	0	4	0	+4	3	Qualified for Super League
4	Bagmati Youth Club	1	1	0	0	5	4	+1	3	Qualified for Super League
5	APF	0	0	0	0	0	0	0	0	Qualified for Super League
6	RS Resort & Beach	1	0	0	1	4	5	−1	0	
7	New Road Team	1	0	0	1	0	4	−4	0	
8	Church Boys United	1	0	0	1	0	5	−5	0	
9	Jhapa	1	0	0	1	0	5	−5	0	

Source: Hamro Khelkud
Rules for classification: 1) Points;2) Goal difference;3) Number of goals scored.

== Results ==
No Home\Away	APF	BYC	CBU	JFC	NPC	NRT	RBF	SFC	TAC
APF	—								
Bagmati Youth Club		—					5–4		
Church Boys United			—		0–5				
Jhapa				—					0–5
Nepal Police			5–0		—				
New Road Team						—		0–4	
RS Resort & Beach		4–5					—		
Sankata						4–0		—	
Tribhuvan Army				5–0					—

Source: ANFA Women's League
Legend: Blue = left column team win; Yellow = draw; Red = top row team win.

=== Form ===
Team ╲ Round	1
APF	
Bagmati Youth Club	W
Church Boys United	L
Jhapa	L
Nepal Police	W
New Road Team	L
Sankata	W
RS Resort & Beach	L
Tribhuvan Army	W

Source: ANFA Women's League
W = Win; D = Draw; L = Lose

=== Positions by round ===
Round	1
APF	5
Bagmati Youth Club	4
Church Boys United	8
Jhapa FC	9
Nepal Police	1
New Road Team	7
RS Resort & Beach	6
Sankata	3
Tribhuvan Army	2

Leader

Source: ANFA Women's League

== Top scorers ==
Rank	Player	Team	Goals

== Broadcast rights ==
- Khel Drishya on YouTube
