= 2021 National Women's League (Nepal) =

National Women’s League
- Season: 2021
- Dates: 20 January 2021 - 19 February 2021
- Champions: APF FC
- Top goalscorer: Sabitra Bhandari (43 goals)
- Highest scoring: APF FC 22–0 Chaudandigadhi (1 February 2021)
- Longest unbeaten run: APF Club (12 matches)
- Longest losing run: Chandrapur (12 matches)
- All statistics correct as of 17 February 2021.

The 2021 National Women's League, also known as Deputy Mayor National Women's League, was the 2021 edition of the first-tier women's club football competition in Nepal organized by the All Nepal Football Association. The season started on 21 January. It was the first season since 2017/18, as the 2020 season was cancelled due to the COVID-19 pandemic in Nepal. APF FC was crowned champions on 17 February 2021.

== Qualification ==
The season was made up of the teams that qualified for the 2019–20 season, which was cancelled due to the COVID-19 pandemic in Nepal; the three departmental teams as well as four regionally qualified teams. For the 2019–20 National Women's League season, the three departmental sports teams APF FC, Nepal Army FC, and Nepal Police FC were qualified and were joined by four local teams determined by all four semi-finalists of the Chandrapur Upa Mayor National Women's League Qualification Tournament played between Waling Municipality, Bangsgadhi Municipality, Biratnagar Metropolitan City, Birendranagar Municipality, Barhabise Municipality, Chaudandigadhi Municipality, Bidur Municipality, and Chandrapur Municipality in Chandrapur, Rautahat in February 2020.

Team	Qualification Method
Biratnagar Metropolitan City	Qualification Tournament semi-finalist
Chandrapur Municipality	Qualification Tournament winner
Chaudandigadhi Municipality	Qualification Tournament semi-finalist
APF FC	
Nepal Army FC	
Nepal Police FC	
Waling Municipality	Qualification Tournament Runner-up

== Teams ==
Team	Location
Biratnagar Metropolitan City	Biratnagar, Morang, Province No. 1
Chandrapur Municipality	Chandrapur, Rautahat, Province No. 2
Chaudandigadhi Municipality	Chaudandigadhi, Udayapur, Province No. 1
APF FC	Kathmandu, Kathmandu, Bagmati Province
Nepal Army FC	Kathmandu, Kathmandu, Bagmati Province
Nepal Police FC	Kathmandu, Kathmandu, Bagmati Province
Waling Municipality	Waling, Syangja, Gandaki Province

=== Personnel and kits ===
Team	Head Coach	Captain	Foreign players	Kit Sponsor
Biratnagar Metropolitan City	(Nepal) Paras Chaudary	(Nepal) Kalpana Karki	(India) Purnima Kumari	
Chandrapur Municipality	(Nepal) Noor Raj Kafle	(Nepal) Rojina Shrestha		
Chaudandigadhi Municipality	(Nepal) Dipak Thapa	(Nepal) Chumlungma Rai	(India) Aimit Lepcha (India) Angela Bhutia (India) Sujata Rai (India) Deepshika Biswakarma	
APF FC	(Nepal) Bhagwati Thapa	(Nepal) Anita Basnet		Agni Mahindra
Nepal Army FC	(Nepal) Raju Tamang	(Nepal) Kabita Dhimal		Bajaj Pulsar
Nepal Police FC	(Nepal) Sanjeev Joshi	(Nepal) Ghim Kumari Gurung		Nepal Telecom
Waling Municipality	(Nepal) Dilip Thapa	(Nepal) Saraswoti Hamal	(Cameroon) Metho Elodie Ruth (Cameroon) Kiomegne Djomo Vanessa Noelle (Cameroon) Djoubi Soline Diane (Cameroon) Touta Ornella Evanick Noelle	Jagdamba Cement

== Venues ==
The league was played centrally in two venues in two cities in the Kathmandu Valley.

Nepal

Kathmandu	Lalitpur
Dasarath Rangasala	ANFA Complex
Capacity: 15,000	Capacity: 6,000

== League table ==
Pos	Team	Pld	W	D	L	GF	GA	GD	Pts
1	APF FC (C)	12	12	0	0	77	1	+76	36
2	Nepal Army FC	12	8	2	2	63	7	+56	26
3	Nepal Police FC	12	5	3	4	28	10	+18	18
4	Waling Municipality	12	5	2	5	26	22	+4	17
5	Biratnagar Metropolitan City	12	5	1	6	16	28	−12	16
6	Chandrapur Municipality	12	3	0	9	12	49	−37	9
7	Chaudandigadhi Municipality	12	0	0	12	4	106	−102	0

Source: ANFA
Rules for classification: 1) points; 2) goal difference; 3) head-to-head.
(C) Champions

== Results ==
Home \ Away	APF	BIR	CHAN	CHAU	NPC	TAC	WAL
APF FC	—	7–0	6–0	22–0	2–1		6–0
Biratnagar	0–1	—	0–1	0–0	1–0	0–7	1–1
Chandrapur	0–8	0–5	—	2–1	1–3	0–0	
Chaudandigadhi	0–14	1–2	1–7	—	0–6	0–12	1–7
Nepal Police FC	0–3	0–1	3–0		—	1–1	0–1
Nepal Army FC	1–1	7–0	6–1	9–0	0–0	—	7–0
Waling	0–3	0–1	3–0	10–0	1–0		—

Source: ANFA
Legend: Blue = home team win; Yellow = draw; Red = away team win.

== Awards ==
=== End-of-season awards ===
Award	Winner	Club
Best Goalkeeper	Usha Nath	Nepal Police Club
Best Defender	Amrita Jaisi	Nepal Police Club
Best Midfielder	Bimala Chaudhary	Nepal Army FC
Best Forward	Sabitra Bhandari	APF Club
Best Head Coach	Bhagwati Thapa	APF Club
Most Valuable Player	Saru Limbu	APF Club
Fair Play Award	Chandrapur	

== Broadcast rights ==
All matches were streamed live on MyCujoo.
