= 2024–25 ANFA Women's League =

ANFA Women's League
- Season: 2024–25
- Dates: 1 September 2024 – 29 January 2025
- Champions: APF FC (7th title)
- AFC Champions League: APF FC
- SAFF Club Championship: APF FC
- Matches: 69
- Goals: 292 (4.23 per match)
- Top goalscorer: Rashmi Ghising (35 goals)
- Biggest win: APF FC 19–0 Sudurpaschim Province (23 September 2024)
- Total attendance: 17,689
- Average attendance: 272

The 2024–25 ANFA Women's League, previously known as the National Women's League, was the season of the first-tier women's club football competition in Nepal organized by the All Nepal Football Association. The tournament was held from September 2024 to January 2025.

== Format ==
All the Clubs take part in Single Round Robin a total of 45 matches in the first round. Then, the top 5 teams from fist round will take part in Double Round Robin Format in the Super League.

The top four teams from the Super League will progress to the Qualifiers, then compete in the Eliminator, and finally, the Finals of the competition.

== Teams ==
=== Stadiums and locations ===
The season was made up of 5 teams that participated in the 2022 as well as 5 further regionally qualified teams.

Club	City	Province	Stadium	Capacity
Karnali Province	Birendranagar, Surkhet	Karnali Province	Karnali Province Stadium	12,500
Koshi Province	Dharan, Sunsari	Koshi Province	Dharan Stadium	10,000
Sudurpaschim Province	Godawari, Dhangadhi,	Sudurpashchim Province	Dhangadhi Stadium	10,000
APF FC	Kathmandu	Bagmati Province	Halchowk Stadium	5,000
Nepal Police FC	Kathmandu	Bagmati Province	Nepal Police Academy, Maharjgunj	1500
Sankata FC	Kathmandu	Bagmati Province	Dasharath Rangasala	15,000
Nepal Army FC	Kathmandu	Bagmati Province	Tribhuwan Army Stadium, Bhadrakali	2000
Bagmati Youth Club	Sarlahi, Sarlahi	Madhesh Province	Bagmati Club Football Ground	NA
Chandrapur Municipality	Chandrapur, Rautahat	Madhesh Province	Rautahat District FA Ground	1500
Waling Municipality	Waling, Syangja	Gandaki Province	Waling Malay Bagar Football Ground	NA

=== Personnel and Sponsorships ===
Team	Head Coach	Captain	Kit Manufacturer	Shirt Sponsor
Bagmati Youth Club	Sunil Kumar Shrestha	(Nepal) Divya Yasmali Magar	Li-Ning	
Chandrapur Municipality	Bhojraj Ghimire (Asst. Coach)	(Nepal) Saloni Rana Magar	Kelme	Aiwina
APF FC	Jibesh Pandey	(Nepal) Anita Basnet	Kelme	Mahindra
Nepal Police FC	Bhola Silwal	(Nepal) Niru Thapa	Kelme	
Karnali Province	Ganesh Khadka (Asst. Coach)	(Nepal) Lila Joshi		
Koshi Province	Shyam Manandhar	(Nepal) Simran Rai	Joya	Joya
Sankata FC	Rabindra Shilakar	(Nepal) Sushma Maharjan		
Sudurpaschim Province	Dipesh Yonjan Lama	(Nepal) Kanti Patali		
Nepal Army FC	Chaun Bahadhur Thapa	(Nepal) Anchali Waiba	Kelme	
Waling Municipality	Dilip Thapa	(Nepal) Maya Maske		Garima Bikas Bank

== Foreign players ==
ANFA allowed maximum of three foreign players per team but only two can be part of starting 11.

Team	Player 1	Player 2	Player 3	Other registered player(s)	Former player(s)
Bagmati Youth Club	(India) Sujata Rai	(Mauritius) Eva Pierrot	(Ghana) Gifty Acheampong	—	—
Chandrapur Municipality	—	—	—	—	—
APF FC	—	—	—	—	—
Nepal Police FC	—	—	—	—	—
Karnali Province	—	—	—	—	—
Koshi Province	(India) Buli Sarkar	(India) Sunita Sarkar	(India) Tamalika Sarkar	—	—
Sankata FC	(Senegal) Tening Sene	(Ghana) Selina Anima	(Nigeria) Temilope Dominique Owoeye	(Senegal) Jeannette Dominique Sagna	—
Sudurpaschim Province	—	—	—	—	—
Nepal Army FC	—	—	—	—	—
Waling Municipality	(Uganda) Jackline Nassali	(Uganda) Cissy Nantongo	—	—	—

== Venues ==
Nepal

Kathmandu	Lalitpur
Dasarath Rangasala	ANFA Complex
Capacity: 20,000	Capacity: 6,000

== League table ==
Pos	Team	Pld	W	D	L	GF	GA	GD	Pts	Qualification
1	APF FC (C)	9	8	1	0	53	2	+51	25	Qualified for Super League
2	Nepal Army FC	9	7	1	1	51	4	+47	22	Qualified for Super League
3	Nepal Police FC	9	6	3	0	22	2	+20	21	Qualified for Super League
4	Waling Municipality	9	5	0	4	17	18	−1	15	Qualified for Super League
5	Koshi Province	9	4	2	3	15	19	−4	14	Pulled out of the Super League due to Financial Problem
6	Bagmati Youth Club	9	3	1	5	10	19	−9	10	Qualified for Super League
7	Sankata FC	9	2	2	5	10	13	−3	8	
8	Chandrapur Municipality	9	1	5	3	7	20	−13	8	
9	Karnali Province	9	1	1	7	4	26	−22	4	
10	Sudurpaschim Province	9	0	0	9	3	71	−68	0	

Source: Hamro Khelkud
Rules for classification: 1) Points; 2) Goal difference; 3) Goals scored; 4) head-to-head.
(C) Champions

== Results ==
Home \ Away	APF	TAC	NPC	WAL	KOP	BYC	SFC	CHA	KAP	SUP
APF FC	—	2–1	0–0	2–1	8–0	7–0	3–0	6–0	6–1	19–0
Nepal Army FC	1–2	—	1–1	8–0	5–0	3–0	4–0	10–0	5–0	14–1
Nepal Police FC	0–0	1–1	—	2–0	4–0	1–0	2–1	0–0	3–0	9–0
Waling Municipality	1–2	0–8	0–2	—	0–4	4–0	1–0	2–1	4–0	5–1
Koshi Province	0–8	0–5	0–4	4–0	—	2–1	0–0	1–1	4–0	4–0
Bagmati Youth Club	0–7	0–3	0–1	0–4	1–2	—	3–1	0–0	1–0	5–1
Sankata FC	0–3	0–4	1–2	0–1	0–0	1–3	—	0–0	2–0	6–0
Chandrapur Municipality	0–6	0–10	0–0	1–2	1–1	0–0	0–0	—	1–1	4–0
Karnali Province	0–6	0–5	0–3	0–4	0–4	0–1	0–2	1–1	—	3–0
Sudurpaschim Province	0–19	1–14	0–9	1–5	0–4	1–5	0–6	0–4	0–3	—

Source: ANFA Women's League
Legend: Blue = home team win; Yellow = draw; Red = away team win.

=== Form ===
Team ╲ Round	1	2	3	4	5	6	7	8	9
APF FC	D	W	W	W	W	W	W	W	W
Bagmati Youth Club	W	L	L	L	D	L	W	W	L
Chandrapur Municipality	D	D	L	W	D	D	L	D	L
Nepal Police FC	D	W	W	W	D	D	W	W	W
Karnali Province	D	L	L	L	L	W	L	L	L
Koshi Province	W	W	W	L	D	L	L	D	W
Sankata FC	L	D	L	W	D	L	W	L	L
Sudurpaschim Province	L	L	L	L	L	L	L	L	L
Nepal Army FC	W	L	W	W	D	W	W	W	W
Waling Municipality	L	W	W	L	W	W	L	L	W

Source: ANFA Women's League
W = Win; D = Draw; L = Lose

=== Positions by round ===
Round	1	2	3	4	5	6	7	8	9
APF FC	6	3	3	2	1	1	1	1	1
Bagmati Youth Club	3	4	6	8	8	8	7	6	6
Chandrapur Municipality	5	7	7	6	6	6	8	8	8
Nepal Police FC	7	2	2	1	2	3	3	3	3
Karnali Province	4	8	9	9	9	9	9	9	9
Koshi Province	1	1	1	4	4	5	5	5	5
Sankata FC	9	9	8	7	7	7	6	7	7
Sudurpaschim Province	8	10	10	10	10	10	10	10	10
Nepal Army FC	1	5	4	3	3	2	2	2	2
Waling Municipality	10	6	5	5	5	4	4	4	4

Leader

Source: ANFA Women's League

== Super League ==
Pos	Team	Pld	W	D	L	GF	GA	GD	Pts	Qualification
1	APF FC	8	8	0	0	43	3	+40	24	Advance to Qualifier 1
2	Nepal Army FC	8	5	1	2	26	6	+20	16	Advance to Qualifier 1
3	Nepal Police FC	8	3	2	3	11	10	+1	11	Advance to Eliminator
4	Bagmati Youth Club	8	1	1	6	4	21	−17	4	Advance to Eliminator
5	Waling Municipality	8	1	0	7	5	49	−44	3	

Source: Hamro Khelkud
Rules for classification: 1) Points; 2) Goal difference; 3) Goals scored; 4) head-to-head.

== Results ==
=== Fixtures and results ===
Home \ Away	APF	BYC	TAC	NPC	WAL
APF FC	—	5–1	3–1	6–0	9–0
Bagmati Youth Club	0–6	—	0–3	0–2	1–3
Nepal Army FC	1–2	2–0	—	0–0	6–1
Nepal Police FC	0–2	0–0	0–1	—	5–0
Waling Municipality	0–10	0–2	0–12	1–4	—

Source: ANFA Women's League
Legend: Blue = home team win; Yellow = draw; Red = away team win.

=== Results by match ===
The table lists the results of the teams after each match.

Team ╲ Round	1	2	3	4	5	6	7	8
APF FC	W	W	W	W	W	W	W	W
Bagmati Youth Club	L	L	L	W	L	L	D	L
Nepal Police FC	W	D	W	L	W	L	D	L
Nepal Army FC	W	D	W	L	W	W	W	L
Waling Municipality	L	L	L	L	L	L	L	W

Source: ANFA Women's League
W = Win; D = Draw; L = Lose

=== Positions by round ===
Round	1	2	3	4	5	6	7	8
APF FC	2	1	1	1	1	1	1	1
Bagmati Youth Club	5	4	4	4	4	4	4	4
Nepal Army FC	3	3	2	2	2	2	2	2
Nepal Police FC	1	2	3	3	3	3	3	3
Waling Municipality	4	5	5	5	5	5	5	5

Leader

Source: ANFA Women's League

== Super League Matches ==
- All times are in NST (UTC+5:45).

Super League Match Results

=== Round 1 ===
2 January 2025	Nepal Army	2–0	Bagmati Youth Club	Lalitpur
15:00	B. Chaudhary 25', 71'	Report		Stadium: ANFA Complex; Attendance: 275; Referee: Gyan Bahadur Tamang; Player of the Match: Bimala Chaudahary (TAFC)

3 January 2025	Nepal Police	5–0	Waling Municipality	Lalitpur
15:00	A. Sherpa 26', 48'; S. Lawati 45+1', 60'; P. Rana 46'	Report		Stadium: ANFA Complex; Referee: Nabindra Maharjan; Player of the Match: Samjhana Lawati (NPC)

=== Round 2 ===
4 January 2025	APF FC	5–1	Bagmati Youth Club	Lalitpur
12:00	Rashmi Ghising; 6', 12', 69': Sabitha Rana Magar; 27': Anita K.C; 59'	Report	Pushpa Kumari Khadka; 16'	Stadium: ANFA Complex; Attendance: 350; Referee: Anjana Rai; Player of the Match: Rashmi Kumari Ghising (APF)

5 January 2025	Nepal Army	0–0	Nepal Police	Lalitpur
15:00		Report		Stadium: ANFA Complex; Attendance: 425; Referee: Nabindra Maharjan; Player of the Match: Birsana Chaudhary (NPC)

=== Round 3 ===
6 January 2025	APF FC	9–0	Waling Municipality	Lalitpur
15:00	Rashmi Ghising; 3', 6', 17', 77': Saru Limbu; 31', 39': Gita Rana; 5', 42' (pen.): Anita K.C; 90+1'	Report		Stadium: ANFA Complex; Referee: Anjana Rai; Player of the Match: Rashmi Kumari Ghising (APF)

7 January 2025	Bagmati Youth Club	0–2	Nepal Police	Lalitpur
15:00		Report	Niru Thapa; 9': Puja Rana; 82'	Stadium: ANFA Complex; Attendance: 220; Referee: Kriti Sen; Player of the Match: Puja Rana (NPC)

=== Round 4 ===
8 January 2025	Waling Municipality	0–12	Nepal Army	Lalitpur
15:00		Report	B. Chaudhary; 34', 48', 60', 81' (pen.): Chandra Bhandari; 23', 31', 69': Sapana Lama; 25', 75': Anjana T Rai; 56', 70': Bimala BK; 90+1'	Stadium: ANFA Complex; Attendance: 375; Referee: Kriti Sen; Player of the Match: Bimala Chaudhary (TAFC)

9 January 2025	APF FC	6–0	Nepal Police	Lalitpur
15:00	Anita Basnet; 10', 90+2', 90+3': Sara Limbu; 85', 87': Renuka Nagarkote; 37'	Report		Stadium: ANFA Complex; Referee: Umesh Bidari; Player of the Match: Saru Limbu(APF)

=== Round 5 ===
10 January 2025	Waling Municipality	0–2	Bagmati Youth Club	Lalitpur
15:00		Report	Asmita Khawas; 52': Bishnu Maya Bal; 75'	Stadium: ANFA Complex

11 January 2025	APF FC	3–1	Nepal Army	Lalitpur
15:00	Nisha Thokar; 60': Anita Basnet; 85': Preeti Rai; 90'	Report	Bimala Thapa; 70'	Stadium: ANFA Complex

=== Round 6 ===
13 January 2025	Bagmati Youth Club	0–3	Nepal Army	Lalitpur
15:00		Report	Sapana Lama; 6': Punam Jargha Magar; 22': Chandra Bhandari; 90+1'	Stadium: ANFA Complex; Attendance: 355; Referee: Nabindra Maharjan; Player of the Match: Bimala Chaudhary (TAFC)

14 January 2025	Waling Municipality	1–4	Nepal Police	Lalitpur
15:00	Yasodha Kumari Chiral; 85'	Report	Niru Thapa; 15': Anuska Sherpa; 28': Puja Rana; 32': Dhana Bohora; (43 (own goal))	Stadium: ANFA Complex; Referee: Kriti Sen; Player of the Match: Puja Rana (NPC)

=== Round 7 ===
15 January 2025	Bagmati Youth Club	0–6	APF FC	Lalitpur
15:00		Report	Rashmi Ghising; 43', 45+2': Saru Limbu; 56', 90+1': Preeti Rai; 88': Semihangma Limbu Pandhak; (55 (own goal))	Stadium: ANFA Complex; Referee: Nabindra Maharjan; Player of the Match: Sabita Rana Magar (APF)

16 January 2025	Nepal Police	0–1	Nepal Army	Lalitpur
15:00		Report	Samiksha Ghimire; (90+5 (own goal))	Stadium: ANFA Complex; Referee: Prajwol Chhetri; Player of the Match: Chandra Bhandari (TAFC)

=== Round 8 ===
17 January 2025	Waling Municipality	0–10	APF FC	Lalitpur
15:00		Report	Rashmi Ghising; ((4)): Saru Limbu; ((2)): Sabitha Rana Magar; ((2)): Preeti Rai; ((1)): Renuka Nagarkote; ((1))	Stadium: ANFA Complex; Attendance: 225; Referee: Kriti Sen; Player of the Match: Preeti Rai (APF)

18 January 2025	Nepal Police	0–0	Bagmati Youth Club	Lalitpur
15:00		Report		Stadium: ANFA Complex; Attendance: 275; Referee: Prajwol Chhetri; Player of the Match: Sahara Limbu (BYC)

=== Round 9 ===
19 January 2025	Nepal Army	6–1	Waling Municipality	Lalitpur
15:00	Chandra Bhandari; 14', 23', 53', 67', 73': B. Chaudhary; 63'	Report	Mina Deuba; 17'	Stadium: ANFA Complex; Referee: Nabindra Maharjan

20 January 2025	Nepal Police	0–2	APF FC	Lalitpur
15:00		Report	Rashmi Ghising; 17': Anita KC; 64'	Stadium: ANFA Complex; Attendance: 350; Referee: Prajwol Chhetri; Player of the Match: Sabita Rana Magar (APF)

=== Round 10 ===
21 January 2025	Bagmati Youth Club	1–3	Waling Municipality	Lalitpur
15:00	Sahara Limbu; 43'	Report	Sushma Tamang; 56', 68', 85'	Stadium: ANFA Complex; Attendance: 75; Referee: Anjana Rai; Player of the Match: Sushma Tamang(WAL)

22 January 2025	Nepal Army	1–2	APF FC	Lalitpur
15:00	Amisha Karki; 83'	Report	Rashmi Ghising; 23': Anita Basnet; 38'	Stadium: ANFA Complex; Attendance: 348; Referee: Nabindara Maharjan; Player of the Match: Renuka Nagarkoti (APF)

== Playoffs ==
=== Bracket ===
Qualifier 1
1	APF FC	2
2	Nepal Army FC	1
3	Nepal Police FC	1
4	Bagmati Youth Club	0

Qualifier 2
Q1L	Nepal Army FC	0 (1)
EW	Nepal Police FC	0 (2)

Grand final
Q1W	APF FC	4
Q2W	Nepal Police FC	0

=== Matches ===
==== Eliminator ====
24 January 2025
11:15 NST (UTC+05:45)

Nepal Police FC	1–0	Bagmati Youth Club
Amrita Jaisi 90+2'	Report

ANFA Complex, Lalitpur
Attendance: 350
Referee: Anjana Rai

==== Qualifier 1 ====
25 January 2025
9:15 NST (UTC+05:45)

APF FC	2–1	Nepal Army FC
Rashmi Ghising 78', 88'	Report	Hima Chaudhary 8'

ANFA Complex, Lalitpur
Referee: Umesh Bidari

==== Qualifier 2 ====
27 January 2025
12:00 NST (UTC+05:45)

Nepal Police FC	0–0	Nepal Army FC
	Report
Penalties
	2–1

ANFA Complex, Lalitpur
Referee: Umesh Bidari

==== Grand Final ====
29 January 2025
13:30 NST (UTC+05:45)

APF FC	4–0	Nepal Police FC
Rana Magar 63', 84'; Limbu 68'; Lama 90+5'	Report

Dasarath Stadium, Kathmandu
Referee: Anjana Rai

== Top scorers ==
Rank	Player	Team	Goals
1	(Nepal) Rashmi Ghising	APF FC	35
2	(Nepal) Chandra Bhandari	Nepal Army	17
3	(Nepal) Bimala Chaudhary	Nepal Army	16
4	(Nepal) Sabita Rana Magar	APF FC	11
4	(Nepal) Saru Limbu	APF FC	11
6	(Nepal) Anita K.C.	APF FC	9
6	(Nepal) Anita Basnet	APF FC	9
6	(Nepal) Amisha Karki	Nepal Army	9
9	(Uganda) Jackline Nassali	Waling Municipality	8
10	(Nepal) Preeti Rai	APF FC	7
10	(Nepal) Dipa Shahi	Nepal Army	7
12	(Nepal) Samjhana Lawati	Nepal Police	6
12	(Nigeria) Temilope Dominique Owoeye	Sankata FC	6
12	(Nepal) Samiksha Magar	Koshi Province	6
12	(Nepal) Anuska Sherpa	Nepal Police	6
16	(Nepal) Renuka Nagarkote	APF FC	5
16	(Nepal) Anita Lamjel	Nepal Army	5
16	(Nepal) Gita Rana	APF FC	5

== Awards ==
=== End-of-season awards ===
The following awards were announced after the completion of the grand final that took place on 29 January 2025 at Dasarath Stadium, Kathmandu.

Award	Winner	Club	Amount
Goalkeeper of the year	Sabitri Kishan	APF FC	रू50,000
Golden Boot Award	Rashmi K. Ghishing (35 goals)	APF FC	रू50,000
Most Valuable Player	Sabita Rana Magar	APF FC	रू100,000
Fair Play Award	Nepal Army FC		रू150,000
Runner Up	Nepal Police FC		रू500,000
Champion	APF FC		रू1,000,000

== Broadcast rights ==
- Hamro Khelkud on Youtube
