= Sudurpashchim Province Football Association =

Nepalese province football association

- सुदुरपश्चिम प्रदेश फुटबल संघ
- Official Logo of the SPFA
- Sport: Football
- Jurisdiction: Province
- Membership: 2 district association
- Abbreviation: SPFA
- Founded: 2019; 7 years ago
- Affiliation: All Nepal Football Association (ANFA)
- Headquarters: Dhangadi
- President: Dinesh Kumar Shrestha

Official website
- the-anfa.com/state-football/8
- (Nepal)

Sudurpashchim Province Football Association, (formerly known as Province No. 7 Football Association) and also known as Sudurpashchim Province FA is a Nepali provincial football Association, based in the Sudurpashchim Province of Nepal. It sends men's state team for National Games and women's team for National Women's League.

Sudurpashchim Province FA also conduct different grassroot programs and section tournament for the various level of national team i.e. Junior as well as Senior national team.

== Affiliated District Football Boards ==
There are currently 2 district football associations affiliated with Sudurpashchim Province Football Association.

District Football Associations

- Kailali District Football Association
- Kanchanpur District Football Association

== Teams ==
=== Sudurpashchim Province FA teams ===
Club	League
Sudurpashchim Province men's football team	National Games
Sudurpashchim Province women's football team	National Women's League
