= Purnima Kumari =

Indian footballer

Personal information
- Full name: Purnima Kumari Manjhi
- Date of birth: 10 February 2005 (age 21)
- Place of birth: Jambahar, Simdega, Jharkhand, India
- Position: Defender

Team information
- Current team: Sethu
- Number: 2

Senior career*
Years	Team	Apps	(Gls)
- Jharkhand
2021	Biratnagar Metropolitan City		
2024–	Sethu		

International career^{‡}
- India U17
- India U20
2025–	India	12	(0)
- * Club domestic league appearances and goals ‡ National team caps and goals as of 8 October 2026

Purnima Kumari (born 10 February 2005) is an Indian professional footballer from Jharkhand who plays as a defender for the Indian Women's League club Sethu and the India national football team. She has also represented Jharkhand in the senior national championships.

== Early life and education ==
Kumari is from Jambahar village, Thethaitanger block, Simdega district, Jharkhand. Her father's name Jeetu Manjhi and she has five sisters and a brother, Ranjit Manjhi, who is a daily wage worker. Her brother also runs a roadside cart to sell instant food. Her second eldest sister, Sanmait Kumari brought her up after the death of her mother Chaiti Devi in 2006. She comes from a poor family and lives in a thatched hut. Since they do not have a TV at home, the family tried to watch her under–17 World Cup matches on a mobile phone, but bad network let them down. She learnt football playing with her brother during her childhood.

She studied at Government Middle School, Jambahar and shifted to Ursuline Convent School in Simdega town from Class 6. In 2016, she joined a residential girls football training center in Hazaribag where she joined St. Columbus collegiate school.

== Career ==
Kumari represented India in the 7th FIFA U–17 Women's World Cup 2022 at Odisha. The Indian team played three matches against USA, Brazil and Morocco in Group A and lost all their matches.

She took part in the School Games Federation of India games, Subroto Cup and in 2019 played the under–17 All India Federation Cup. She also played in the under–17 SAFF Women's championship in Bhutan in 2019–2020, under–19 SAFF Women's championship in Bangladesh in 2021 and under–18 SAFF Women's championship in Jamshedpur in 2022. She made her senior India debut against Jordan at the Al Hamriya Sports Club Stadium, Sharjah, UAE on 20 February 2025.

In 2021, she played for the club Biratnagar Metropolitan City in the 2021 season of the Nepal National Women's League.

=== Awards ===
Paying for Sethu FC in the Indian Women's League 2025, she bagged the Best Defender award.

== Career statistics ==
=== International ===
As of 8 October 2026

National team	Year	Caps	Goals
India	2025	6	0
India	2026	6	0
Total		12	0

== Honours ==
India

- SAFF Women's Championship: 2026
