= Sankata F.C. (women) =

Sankata women's football club of Nepal

- Full name: Sankata Women's Football Club
- Nickname: Sankata Ladies
- Founded: 2024; 2 years ago
- Stadium: Dasharath Rangasala
- Owner: Sankata Boys Sports Club
- Coach: Rabindra Silakar
- League: ANFA Women's League
- 2024: ANFA Women's League, 7th of 10

Sankata Women's Football Club (Nepali: संकटा महिला फुटबल क्लब) is a professional women's football club based in Kathmandu, Nepal. The club competes in the top tier of Nepali women's football, the ANFA Women's League.

== History ==
Sankata Women's FC made its debut in the ANFA Women's League in 2024. Despite a challenging start—losing 4–0 to Nepal Army Club in their first match—the team showed resilience throughout the season. They finished 7th out of 10 teams, narrowly avoiding relegation.

In the 2025–26 season, Sankata FC was placed in Group B of the ANFA Women’s League Qualifiers, alongside New Road Team, Butwal Lumbini, and NBM Pokhara Girls FC and they became the first team to officially qualify for the 2025–26 season from qualifiers.

== Record by season ==
Champions	Runners-up	Third place	Promoted	Relegated

Season	League	Teams	Position	AFC Women's Champions League
2024–25	ANFA Women's League	10	7th	DNQ
2025–26	ANFA Women's League	10	TBD	TBD

== Squad ==
As of 9 September 2024

Note: Flags indicate national team as defined under FIFA eligibility rules; some limited exceptions apply. Players may hold more than one non-FIFA nationality.

No.	Pos.	Nation	Player
21	GK	SEN	Tening Sene
1	GK	NEP	Jharana Nagarkoti
22	GK	NEP	Sangita Waiba
25	DF	GHA	Selina Anima
19	DF	NEP	Manita Tamang
5	DF	NEP	Sushma Maharjan (captain)
30	DF	NEP	Yasoda Shahi
6	DF	NEP	Sima Rani Ghale
2	DF	NEP	Aishworya Nepali
24	DF	NEP	Aakriti Rai
18	DF	NEP	Pratibha Gandhari
20	DF	NEP	Sabina Tamang

No.	Pos.	Nation	Player
10	MF	SEN	Jeannette Dominique Sagna
15	MF	NEP	Punam Chemjong
16	MF	NEP	Tashi Lhamu Sherpa
17	MF	NEP	Mamata Pun
11	MF	NEP	Pratiksha Thakuri
14	MF	NEP	Sun Maya Gurung
23	MF	NEP	Diki Syangbo Tamang
8	MF	NEP	Sushila KC
7	FW	NGA	Temilope Jeniffer
9	FW	NEP	Anu Bhusal
26	FW	NEP	Smriti Baral

== List of foreign players ==
Key

- A player name in **bold** signifies they have been capped by the national team.

Each player is mentioned only once, if some of them have rejoined the club later again in different seasons, those entries are excluded from the list.

As of 14 August 2025

No.	Season joined	Nationality	Name	Position	Ref.
7	2024–25	Nigeria	Temilope Jeniffer	FW	
10	2024–25	Senegal	Jeannette Dominique Sagna	MF	
21	2024–25	Senegal	Tening Sene	GK	
25	2024–25	Ghana	Selina Anima	DF	
