= Sabitra Bhandari =

Nepalese footballer (born 1996)

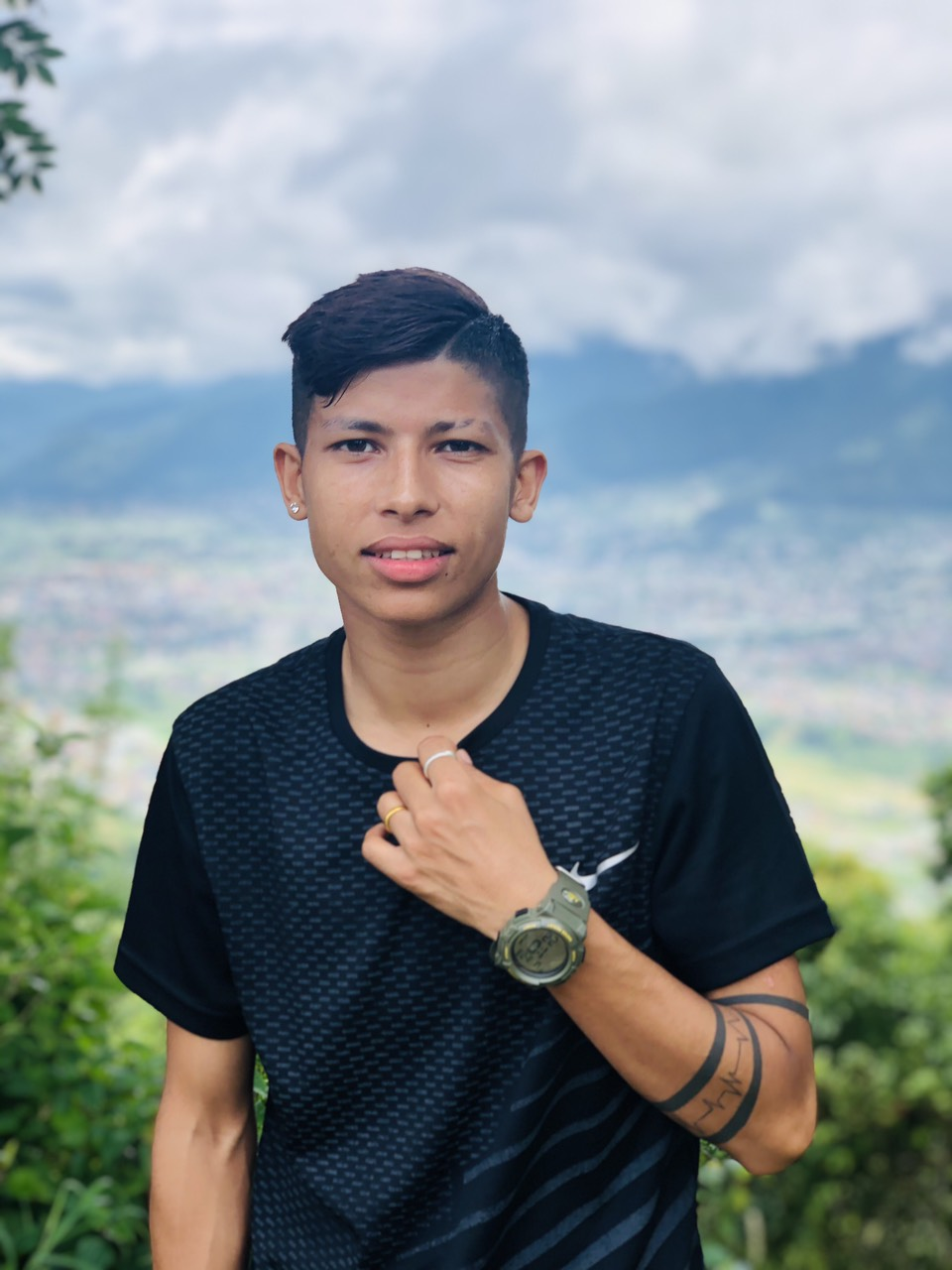
- Bhandari in 2019

Personal information
- Full name: Sabitra Bhandari
- Date of birth: 23 May 1996 (age 30)
- Place of birth: Lamjung, Nepal
- Position: Forward

Team information
- Current team: Wellington Phoenix
- Number: 9

Senior career*
Years	Team	Apps	(Gls)
2014–2019	APF	18	(74)
2018–2019	Sethu	7	(15)
2019–2020	Gokulam Kerala	7	(16)
2022–2023	Gokulam Kerala	10	(29)
2023	Hapoel Ra'anana	4	(6)
2024–2025	Guingamp	29	(7)
2025–	Wellington Phoenix	6	(3)

International career^{‡}
2014–	Nepal	61	(68)
Medal record
Women's football
Representing Nepal
South Asian Games
Silver medal – second place	2016 India
Silver medal – second place	2022 Nepal
SAFF Women's Championship
Runner-up	2019 Nepal
Runner-up	2022 Nepal
Runner-up	2024 Nepal
WAFF Women's Championship
Runner-up	2024 Saudi Arabia
- * Club domestic league appearances and goals as of 26 January 2026 ‡ National team caps and goals as of 6 July 2025

Sabitra Bhandari (Nepali: साबित्रा भण्डारी), popularly known as Samba, is a Nepalese professional footballer who plays as a striker for A-League Women club Wellington Phoenix and captains the Nepal national team.

She is the all-time highest goal scorer in Nepalese football history and broke record as the highest female goalscorer in South Asia, with 53 goals. She made history by being the first Nepalese player to play and score in top tier European league. She is also the first ever South Asian player to score a hat-trick in a top tier European league.

== Career ==
At club level, Bhandari played for APF Club. Bhandari made into Nepal national team for the 2014 South Asian Football Federation ChampionshiP and made her international debut against Bhutan, coming off the bench and sealing an 8–0 victory as a 17-year-old.

=== Sethu ===
She joined Indian Women's League side Sethu for the 2018-19 Indian Women's League season. In her debut match she scored 4 goals for the club against Manipur Police on 6 May 2019. She was also awarded with women of the match in her first match with Sethu.

She scored in average of two goals a game during her time in India, leading Sethu FC to winning Indian Women's League title.

=== Gokulam Kerala ===
Bhandari joined Gokulam Kerala for the 2019–2020 season, and eventually won the League championship title and was the league top scorer with 16 goals.

After returning to Gokulam Kerala for the 2023 season, she was the league's top scorer with 31 goals, including five hat-tricks. Her performance helped the team win the league title, marking her third Indian Women's League trophy.

=== Hapoel Ra'anana ===
In June 2023, Bhandari joined Israeli club Hapoel Ra'anana with the announcement receiving over 800 comments and thousands of views while the Israeli embassy in Kathmandu invited her to congratulate her personally. Bhandari made her club debut in August, playing in a cup match against Maccabi Kishronot Hadera, scoring a 90th minute goal in a 2–0 win. She opened the 2024–25 Ligat Nashim season well, scoring all 4 goals in a 4–0 victory over Ramat HaSharon. She also scored in her second match, a 1–1 draw against Hapoel Petah Tikva. Afterwards she scored an injury time equaliser against last season's runner-up Hapoel Katamon Jerusalem. Following the October 7 attacks, Bhandari's spell was cut short after scoring six goals in four league games as well as one goal in three cup matches.

=== Guingamp ===
She made her debut on Feb 3rd, 2024 coming as a substitute on 78th minute. She scored her first goal against Lille OSC on March 2, 2024. In her first season, she scored 1 goal in 10 games for Guingamp.

In 2024–25 season, she scored 6 goals in 19 games making her Guingamp's top goal scorer for 2024–25 season. On March 21, 2025, Bhandari scored brace against Paris Saint-Germain. She also scored hattrick against AS Saint-Étienne making her first ever Nepalese and South Asian player to score hattrick in top tier league in Europe.

=== Wellington Phoenix ===
In July 2025, Wellington Phoenix announced the signing of Bhandari on a two-year contract. On 20 December 2025, Sabitra Bhandari scored two goals and provided one assist for Wellington Phoenix in a league match against Sydney in the A-League Women. The match marked her fourth appearance for the club, during which she found the net for the first time. With this performance, Bhandari became the first Nepali footballer to score in the A-League Women.

== International career ==
Bhandari represents Nepal at the international level. She participated in and even scored a goal against Bhutan at the 2014 SAFF Women's Championship. She represented the country during the 2016 South Asian Games where she scored two goals against Sri Lanka. She scored the only goal in a friendly victory against Malaysia on 17 December 2016.

Bhandari then played in Nepal's first match of the 2016 SAFF Women's Championship against Bhutan. She scored six goals as Nepal won 8–0 to open the tournament and scored 5 goals against Maldives in the 2nd group match.

== Career statistics ==
=== Club ===
Club	Season	League			National cup		Continental		Other		Total	
Club	Season	Division	Apps	Goals	Apps	Goals	Apps	Goals	Apps	Goals	Apps	Goals
APF	2017–18	ANFA Women's League	5	27							5	27
APF	2021	ANFA Women's League	12	43							12	43
APF	2022	ANFA Women's League	1	4							1	4
APF	Total		18	74							18	74
Sethu	2018–19	Indian Women's League	7	15	—		—		—		7	15
Sethu	Total		7	15	—		—		—		7	15
Gokulam Kerala	2019–20	Indian Women's League	7	16	—		—		—		7	16
Gokulam Kerala	2022–23	Indian Women's League	10	29	—		—		—		10	29
Gokulam Kerala	Total		17	45	—		—		—		17	45
Hapoel Ra'anana	2023–24	Liga Alef North	4	6	—		—		—		4	6
Hapoel Ra'anana	Total		4	6	—		—		—		4	6
En Avant Guingamp	2023–24	Première Ligue	4	1	—		—		—		4	1
En Avant Guingamp	2024–25	Première Ligue	25	6	—		—		—		25	6
En Avant Guingamp	Total		29	7	—		—		—		29	7
Wellington Phoenix	2025–26	A-League Women	6	3	—		—		—		6	3
Wellington Phoenix	Total		6	3	—		—		—		6	3
Career total			71	150	—		—		—		71	150

=== International ===
Appearances and goals by national team and year
National team	Year	Apps	Goals
Nepal	2014	-	1
Nepal	2015	-	1
Nepal	2016	-	13
Nepal	2017	-	1
Nepal	2018	-	1
Nepal	2019	-	20
Nepal	2020	-	0
Nepal	2021	-	0
Nepal	2022	-	2
Nepal	2023	-	4
Nepal	2024	-	11
Nepal	2025	-	13
Total		56	68

== International goals ==
No.	Date	Venue	Opponent	Score	Result	Competition
1.	12 November 2014	Jinnah Sports Stadium, Islamabad, Pakistan	Bhutan	8–0	8–0	2014 SAFF Women's Championship
2.	13 February 2016	Jawaharlal Nehru Stadium, Shillong, India	Sri Lanka	2–0	4–0	2016 South Asian Games
3.	13 February 2016	Jawaharlal Nehru Stadium, Shillong, India	Sri Lanka	3–0	4–0	2016 South Asian Games
4.	26 December 2016	Kanchenjunga Stadium, Siliguri, India	Bhutan	1–0	8–0	2016 SAFF Women's Championship
5.	26 December 2016	Kanchenjunga Stadium, Siliguri, India	Bhutan	2–0	8–0	2016 SAFF Women's Championship
6.	26 December 2016	Kanchenjunga Stadium, Siliguri, India	Bhutan	3–0	8–0	2016 SAFF Women's Championship
7.	26 December 2016	Kanchenjunga Stadium, Siliguri, India	Bhutan	5–0	8–0	2016 SAFF Women's Championship
8.	26 December 2016	Kanchenjunga Stadium, Siliguri, India	Bhutan	6–0	8–0	2016 SAFF Women's Championship
9.	26 December 2016	Kanchenjunga Stadium, Siliguri, India	Bhutan	7–0	8–0	2016 SAFF Women's Championship
10.	28 December 2016	Kanchenjunga Stadium, Siliguri, India	Maldives	1–0	9–0	2016 SAFF Women's Championship
11.	28 December 2016	Kanchenjunga Stadium, Siliguri, India	Maldives	2–0	9–0	2016 SAFF Women's Championship
12.	28 December 2016	Kanchenjunga Stadium, Siliguri, India	Maldives	3–0	9–0	2016 SAFF Women's Championship
13.	28 December 2016	Kanchenjunga Stadium, Siliguri, India	Maldives	4–0	9–0	2016 SAFF Women's Championship
14.	28 December 2016	Kanchenjunga Stadium, Siliguri, India	Maldives	6–0	9–0	2016 SAFF Women's Championship
15.	2 January 2017	Kanchenjunga Stadium, Siliguri, India	India	1–2	1–3	2016 SAFF Women's Championship
16.	11 November 2018	Thuwunna Stadium, Yangon, Myanmar	Myanmar	1–0	1–1	2020 AFC Women's Olympic Qualifying Tournament
17.	11 February 2019	Kalinga Stadium, Bhubaneswar, India	India	1–0	2–1	2019 Women's Gold Cup
18.	11 February 2019	Kalinga Stadium, Bhubaneswar, India	India	2–0	2–1	2019 Women's Gold Cup
19.	13 February 2019	Kalinga Stadium, Bhubaneswar, India	Iran	2–0	3–0	2019 Women's Gold Cup
20.	13 February 2019	Kalinga Stadium, Bhubaneswar, India	Iran	3–0	3–0	2019 Women's Gold Cup
21.	12 March 2019	Sahid Rangsala, Biratnagar, Nepal	Bhutan	2–0	3–0	2019 SAFF Women's Championship
22.	16 March 2019	Sahid Rangsala, Biratnagar, Nepal	Bangladesh	2–0	3–0	2019 SAFF Women's Championship
23.	20 March 2019	Sahid Rangsala, Biratnagar, Nepal	Sri Lanka	3–0	4–0	2019 SAFF Women's Championship
24.	22 March 2019	Sahid Rangsala, Biratnagar, Nepal	India	1–1	1–3	2019 SAFF Women's Championship
25.	9 April 2019	Bahtoo Stadium, Mandalay, Myanmar	Indonesia	1–0	2–1	2020 AFC Women's Olympic Qualifying Tournament
26.	9 April 2019	Bahtoo Stadium, Mandalay, Myanmar	Indonesia	2–1	2–1	2020 AFC Women's Olympic Qualifying Tournament
27.	8 September 2019	Central Stadium Karakol, Kyrgyzstan	Kyrgyzstan	1–0	8–2	Friendly
28.	8 September 2019	Central Stadium Karakol, Kyrgyzstan	Kyrgyzstan	2–0	8–2	Friendly
29.	8 September 2019	Central Stadium Karakol, Kyrgyzstan	Kyrgyzstan	6–2	8–2	Friendly
30.	8 September 2019	Central Stadium Karakol, Kyrgyzstan	Kyrgyzstan	7–2	8–2	Friendly
31.	10 September 2019	Central Stadium Karakol, Kyrgyzstan	Tajikistan	1–0	1–0	Friendly
32.	12 September 2019	Central Stadium Karakol, Kyrgyzstan	Uzbekistan	1–?	2–3	Friendly
33.	12 September 2019	Central Stadium Karakol, Kyrgyzstan	Uzbekistan	2–?	2–3	Friendly
34.	5 December 2019	Pokhara Rangasala, Pokhara, Nepal	Maldives	1–0	3–0	2019 South Asian Games
35.	5 December 2019	Pokhara Rangasala, Pokhara, Nepal	Maldives	2–0	3–0	2019 South Asian Games
36.	5 December 2019	Pokhara Rangasala, Pokhara, Nepal	Maldives	3–0	3–0	2019 South Asian Games
37.	6 September 2022	Dasharath Rangasala, Kathmandu, Nepal	Bhutan	1–0	4–0	2022 SAFF Women's Championship
38.	6 September 2022	Dasharath Rangasala, Kathmandu, Nepal	Bhutan	2–0	4–0	2022 SAFF Women's Championship
39.	16 February 2023	Jawaharlal Nehru Indoor Stadium, Chennai, India	India	1–2	2–2	Friendly
40.	16 February 2023	Jawaharlal Nehru Indoor Stadium, Chennai, India	India	2–2	2–2	Friendly
41.	5 April 2023	Dasarath Rangasala, Kathmandu, Nepal	Vietnam	1–4	1–5	2024 AFC Women's Olympic Qualifying Tournament
42.	13 July 2023	Bir Sherestha Shaheed Shipahi Mostafa Kamal Stadium, Dhaka, Bangladesh	Bangladesh	1–1	1–1	Friendly
43.	20 February 2024	King Abdullah Sports City Reserve Stadium, Jeddah, Saudi Arabia	Syria	1–0	4–1	2024 WAFF Women's Championship
44.	22 February 2024	King Abdullah Sports City Reserve Stadium, Jeddah, Saudi Arabia	Iraq	1–0	5–0	2024 WAFF Women's Championship
45.	22 February 2024	King Abdullah Sports City Reserve Stadium, Jeddah, Saudi Arabia	Iraq	2–0	5–0	2024 WAFF Women's Championship
46.	22 February 2024	King Abdullah Sports City Reserve Stadium, Jeddah, Saudi Arabia	Iraq	3–0	5–0	2024 WAFF Women's Championship
47.	22 February 2024	King Abdullah Sports City Reserve Stadium, Jeddah, Saudi Arabia	Iraq	4–0	5–0	2024 WAFF Women's Championship
48.	22 February 2024	King Abdullah Sports City Reserve Stadium, Jeddah, Saudi Arabia	Iraq	5–0	5–0	2024 WAFF Women's Championship
49.	24 February 2024	King Abdullah Sports City Reserve Stadium, Jeddah, Saudi Arabia	Palestine	1–0	4–0	2024 WAFF Women's Championship
50.	24 February 2024	King Abdullah Sports City Reserve Stadium, Jeddah, Saudi Arabia	Palestine	2–0	4–0	2024 WAFF Women's Championship
51.	27 February 2024	Prince Abdullah Al-Faisal Sports City, Jeddah, Saudi Arabia	Lebanon	1–1	2–1	2024 WAFF Women's Championship
52.	24 October 2024	Dasharath Rangasala, Kathmandu, Nepal	Sri Lanka	2–0	6–0	2024 SAFF Women's Championship
53.	27 October 2024	Dasharath Rangasala, Kathmandu, Nepal	India	1–1	1–1	2024 SAFF Women's Championship
54.	20 February 2025	Dasharath Rangasala, Kathmandu, Nepal	Lebanon	1–0	1–0	2025 Vianet Championship
55.	23 February 2025	Dasharath Rangasala, Kathmandu, Nepal	Myanmar	2–2	2–2	2025 Vianet Championship
56.	29 June 2025	Milliy Stadium, Tashkent, Uzbekistan	Laos	2–0	9–0	2026 AFC Women's Asian Cup qualification
57.	29 June 2025	Milliy Stadium, Tashkent, Uzbekistan	Laos	4–0	9–0	2026 AFC Women's Asian Cup qualification
58.	29 June 2025	Milliy Stadium, Tashkent, Uzbekistan	Laos	6–0	9–0	2026 AFC Women's Asian Cup qualification
59.	29 June 2025	Milliy Stadium, Tashkent, Uzbekistan	Laos	7–0	9–0	2026 AFC Women's Asian Cup qualification
60.	2 July 2025	Milliy Stadium, Tashkent, Uzbekistan	Sri Lanka	2–0	8–0	2026 AFC Women's Asian Cup qualification
61.	2 July 2025	Milliy Stadium, Tashkent, Uzbekistan	Sri Lanka	3–0	8–0	2026 AFC Women's Asian Cup qualification
62.	2 July 2025	Milliy Stadium, Tashkent, Uzbekistan	Sri Lanka	4–0	8–0	2026 AFC Women's Asian Cup qualification
63.	5 July 2025	Milliy Stadium, Tashkent, Uzbekistan	Uzbekistan	1–2	3–3 (2–4 p)	2026 AFC Women's Asian Cup qualification
64.	5 July 2025	Milliy Stadium, Tashkent, Uzbekistan	Uzbekistan	3–3	3–3 (2–4 p)	2026 AFC Women's Asian Cup qualification
65.	27 October 2025	Jawaharlal Nehru Stadium, Shillong, India	India	1–0	2–1	Friendly
66.	27 October 2025	Jawaharlal Nehru Stadium, Shillong, India	India	2–0	2–1	Friendly

== Honours ==
Sethu FC

- Indian Women's League: 2018–19

Gokulam Kerala

- Indian Women's League: 2019–20, 2022–23

Individual

- Indian Women's League Top Scorer: 2019–20, 2022–23
- Top Goal Scorer of 2016 SAFF Women's Championship,
- Best Player of Pradhansenapati International women's football tournament 2013,
- Seventh National Game Of Nepal 2013 women's football top goal scorer,
- 2019 Pulsar Sports Award woman's Player Of The year.

== See also ==
- List of top international women's football goal scorers by country
