= 2017–18 National Women's Football League (Nepal) =

National Women’s League
- Season: 2017–18
- Champions: APF FC
- Matches: 16
- Goals: 119 (7.44 per match)
- Top goalscorer: Sabitra Bhandari (27 goals)

The 2017–18 National Women's League, was the 16th season of the edition of the first-tier women's club football competition in Nepal organized by the All Nepal Football Association. APF FC won their first title after defeating defending champions Nepal Police Club in the final.

== Teams ==
Team	Location
Far-Western Region	
Central Region	
Eastern Region	
APF FC	Kathmandu
Nepal Army FC	Kathmandu
Nepal Police FC	Kathmandu
Mid-Western Region	
Western Region	

== Group stage ==
=== Group A ===
Pos	Team	Pld	W	D	L	GF	GA	GD	Pts	Qualification
1	Nepal Police FC	3	3	0	0	15	3	+12	9	Semi-finals
2	Far-Western Region	3	2	0	1	6	2	+4	6	Semi-finals
3	Central Region	3	1	0	2	6	7	−1	3	
4	Eastern Region	3	0	0	3	0	15	−15	0	

Source: RSSSF

=== Group B ===
Pos	Team	Pld	W	D	L	GF	GA	GD	Pts	Qualification
1	APF FC	3	3	0	0	41	0	+41	9	Semi-finals
2	Nepal Army FC	3	2	0	1	24	1	+23	6	Semi-finals
3	Western Region	3	1	0	2	2	26	−24	3	
4	Mid-Western Region	3	0	0	3	0	40	−40	0	

Source: RSSSF

== Knockout stage ==
=== Semi-finals ===
Team 1	Score	Team 2
Nepal Army FC	1–4	Nepal Police FC
APF FC	9–0	Far-Western Region

=== Third place play-off ===
Team 1	Score	Team 2
Nepal Army FC	7–0	Far-Western Region

=== Final ===
Team 1	Score	Team 2
APF FC	3–1	Nepal Police FC

== Awards ==
Award	Winner	Club
Best Goalkeeper	(Nepal) Anjali Subba	APF FC
Best Defender	(Nepal) Dipa Rai	Nepal Army FC
Best Midfielder	(Nepal) Anjila Waiba	Nepal Army FC
Best Forward	(Nepal) Sabitra Bhandari	APF FC
Best Coach	(Nepal) Janak Singh	APF FC
