= APF WFC =

APF football club of Nepal

APF Women
- Full name: Nepal Armed Police Force Women's Football Club
- Founded: 24 October 2001; 24 years ago
- Ground: Halchowk Stadium
- Capacity: 5,000
- Owner: Armed Police Force
- Head coach: Chetan Ghimire
- League: ANFA Women's League
- Website: http://www.apf.gov.np/
| Home colours | Away colours | Third colours |

APF Women’s Football Club (Nepali: एपिएफ), commonly known as APF WFC or simply APF, is a professional women's football club based in Kathmandu, Nepal. It operates as the women’s football division of the Nepal Armed Police Force Club. APF currently competes in the ANFA Women's League, the top tier of women's football in Nepal. The club has become the most successful and dominant in the history of women's club football in Nepal. They have won six national league titles. The club will participate inaugural SAFF Women's Club Championship in 2025.

== History ==
=== National Women's League (2001–2023) ===
APF dominated Nepal’s National Women's League, winning six titles. Their consistent success helped raise the standard of women’s football in Nepal, culminating in a historic milestone as the first Nepali women's club to participate in the AFC Women's Champions League, after winning the 2022 National Women's League.

=== ANFA Women's League (2024–present) ===
In 2024, the club went unbeaten with 18 victories and a single draw, clinching a record-setting ANFA Women's League title.

==== SAFF Women's Club Championship 2025 ====
APF WFC represented Nepal at the SAFF Women's Club Championship held at Dasharath Stadium, Kathmandu. APF began the tournament with a dominant 4–0 victory over Bangladesh’s Nasrin Sports Academy, with Meena Deuba and Rashmi Kumari Ghising each scoring twice. In their second match, APF played out a 0–0 draw against Transport United of Bhutan. The team then secured a 1–0 win over Karachi City FC of Pakistan, before registering another goalless draw against Indian champions East Bengal FC in the group stage. APF advanced to the final, where they faced East Bengal once again. APF were defeated by 3–0, finishing the tournament as runners-up.

== Notable players ==
Below is a list of notable players for APF F.C. Generally, this list includes players that have played 50 or more matches for the club, have at least one senior international cap, and/or have made significant contributions to the club's history.

- Anu Lama
- Chandra Devi Dahal
- Jamuna Gurung
- Sajana Rana
- Sabitra Bhandari
- Rekha Poudel

== Current squad ==
As of 13 August 2025

Note: Flags indicate national team as defined under FIFA eligibility rules; some limited exceptions apply. Players may hold more than one non-FIFA nationality.

| No. | Pos. | Nation | Player |
|---|---|---|---|
| — | GK | NEP | Sabitri Kishan |
| 16 | GK | NEP | Anjila Tumbapo Subba |
| 20 | GK | NEP | Anjana Rana Magar |
| — | DF | NEP | Samiksha Ghimire |
| — | DF | NEP | Sajani Thokar |
| 2 | DF | NEP | Man Maya Damai |
| 3 | DF | NEP | Bimala BK |
| 4 | DF | NEP | Pratiksha Chaudhary |
| 6 | DF | NEP | Hira Kumari Bhujel |
| 12 | DF | NEP | Gita Rana |

| No. | Pos. | Nation | Player |
|---|---|---|---|
| 21 | DF | NEP | Nisha Thokar |
| — | MF | NEP | Hima Rawat |
| 7 | MF | NEP | Renuka Nagarkote |
| 8 | MF | NEP | Saru Limbu |
| 11 | FW | NEP | Anita Basnet (captain) |
| 18 | MF | NEP | Sabita Rana Magar |
| 22 | MF | NEP | Saraswati Hamal |
| 28 | MF | NEP | Kusum Khatiwada |
| 15 | FW | NEP | Anita KC |
| 19 | FW | NEP | Rashmi Kumari Ghising |

== Personnel ==
As of 13 August 2025

| Position | Name |
|---|---|
| Head coach | (Nepal) Chetan Ghimire |
| Assistant coach | (Nepal) Jibesh Pandey |
| Assistant coach | (Nepal) Anu Lama |
| Goalkeeper coach | (Nepal) Gangaram Deuja |
| Team manager | (Nepal) Bijay Kumar KC |
| Physiotherapist | (Nepal) Navina Shrestha |

== Record by season ==
=== ANFA Women's League ===
| Champions | Runners-up | Third place | Promoted | Relegated |

| Season | League | Clubs | Position | AFC Women's Champions League |
|---|---|---|---|---|
| 2006 | NWL | 23 | 1st | |
| 2007 | NWL | 22 | | |
| 2008 | NWL | 10 | | |
| 2010 | NWL | 6 | 1st | |
| 2012 | NWL | 8 | 2nd' | |
| 2013–14 | NWL | 8 | —N/a | |
| 2014 | NWL | 8 | Semi final | |
| 2015 | NWL | 10 | Semi final | |
| 2017–18 | NWL | 8 | 1st | |
| 2021 | NWL | 7 | 1st | |
| 2022 | NWL | 8 | 1st | Preliminary stage |
| 2024 | ANFA Women's League | 10 | 1st | Preliminary stage |
| 2025–26 | ANFA Women's League | 10 | TBD | TBD |

== Honours ==
=== International ===
- SAFF Women's Club Championship
  - Runner Up (1): 2025

=== Domestic ===
- ANFA Women's League
  - Champions (6): 2006, 2010, 2017-2018, 2021, 2022, 2024

== Performance in Asian competitions ==
| Win | Draw | Loss |

| Season | Competition | Round | Club | Result | Top scorer(s) | Goals |
|---|---|---|---|---|---|---|
| 2024–25 | AWCL | Preliminary stage | (Uzbekistan) Nasaf | 0–1 | – | – |
| 2024–25 | AWCL | Preliminary stage | (Malaysia) Sabah | 0–0 | – | – |
| 2025–26 | AWCL | Preliminary stage | (Uzbekistan) Nasaf | 0–3 | Sabita Rana Magar | 1 |
| 2025–26 | AWCL | Preliminary stage | (Thailand) BGC Bundit Asia | 0–4 | Sabita Rana Magar | 1 |
| 2025–26 | AWCL | Preliminary stage | (Saudi Arabia) Al-Nassr | 1–6 | Sabita Rana Magar | 1 |
| 2025–26 | SWCC | Group Stage | (Bangladesh) Nasrin | 4–0 | Rashmi Ghising | 3 |
| 2025–26 | SWCC | Group Stage | (Bhutan) Transport United | 0–0 | Rashmi Ghising | 3 |
| 2025–26 | SWCC | Group Stage | (Pakistan) Karachi City | 1–0 | Rashmi Ghising | 3 |
| 2025–26 | SWCC | Group Stage | (India) East Bengal | 0–0 | Rashmi Ghising | 3 |
| 2025–26 | SWCC | Final | (India) East Bengal | 0–3 | Rashmi Ghising | 3 |

== See also ==
- List of top-division football clubs in AFC countries
- Nepal women's national football team
