= Sudurpashchim Province women's football team =

Sudurpashchim Province
- Full name: Sudurpashchim Province women's football team
- Founded: 2019; 7 years ago
- Owner: Sudurpashchim Province Football Association
- League: National Women's League
- Website: koshiprovincefootball.org.np
Away colours

Sudurpashchim Province women's football team, (formerly known as Province No. 7 women's football team) and also known as Team Sudurpashchim is a Nepali provincial women's football team, based in the Sudurpashchim Province of Nepal. The team plays association football in the National Women's League Nepal, which is the top tier professional women's football competition in Nepal.

== Records by seasons ==
Season	Teams	Position	AFC Women's Champions League
2024	10	10th	

== Current squad ==
As of 9 September 2024

Note: Flags indicate national team as defined under FIFA eligibility rules; some limited exceptions apply. Players may hold more than one non-FIFA nationality.

No.	Pos.	Nation	Player
1	GK	NEP	Bhagwati Kumari Thapa
5	DF	NEP	Aarati BK
2	DF	NEP	Alina Kumari Chaudhary
15	DF	NEP	Himani Shahi
3	DF	NEP	Jharana Thapa Magar
13	DF	NEP	Mamata Kumari Saud
4	DF	NEP	Manisha Okheda
21	DF	NEP	Amita Bhul
12	DF	NEP	Purnima Tadi
27	DF	NEP	Shanti BK
29	DF	NEP	Kamala Kumari Bist
23	DF	NEP	Sumi Hangma Rai
7	MF	NEP	Anita Khadka
19	MF	NEP	Bibeshwari Chaudhary

No.	Pos.	Nation	Player
14	MF	NEP	Aasika Thapa
10	MF	NEP	Dipa Rokaya
20	MF	NEP	Janaki Bhandari
11	MF	NEP	Kanti Patali
8	MF	NEP	Puja BK
18	MF	NEP	Sangita BK
9	MF	NEP	Tulasi Shahi
16	MF	NEP	Tulchha Bohara
25	MF	NEP	Asmita Maski Magar
28	MF	NEP	Dhan Kumari Limbu
26	MF	NEP	Ritika Karki
32	MF	NEP	Hisila Khadka
17	FW	NEP	Lila Chand

== Technical staff ==
Role	Name
Head coach	(Nepal) Dipesh Yonjan Lama
Team Manager	(Nepal) Mina Thagunna
Physio	(Nepal) Upendra Badal
Team Staff	(Nepal) Ganesh Bhandari, Thakkar Deuba, Arpan Karki, Santosh Bhatta
