= 2022 National Women's League (Nepal) =

National Women’s League
- Season: 2022
- Dates: 24 March - 13 April
- Champions: APF FC
- AFC Champions League: APF FC

The 2022 National Women's League, also known as Deputy Mayor National Women's League, was the 2022 edition of the first-tier women's club football competition in Nepal organized by the All Nepal Football Association. The season was scheduled to start on 29 January 2022, but was postponed to March 2022. APF FC was declared the champions of the league by ANFA in 2023.

== Teams ==
The season was made up of all teams that participated in the 2021 as well as two further regionally qualified teams.

Team	Location
Biratnagar Metropolitan City	Biratnagar, Morang, Province No. 1
Chandrapur Municipality	Chandrapur, Rautahat, Madhesh Province
APF FC	Kathmandu, Kathmandu, Bagmati Province
Nepal Army FC	Kathmandu, Kathmandu, Bagmati Province
Nepal Police FC	Kathmandu, Kathmandu, Bagmati Province
Waling Municipality	Waling, Syangja, Gandaki Province
Lalitpur Metropolis	Lalitpur, Lalitpur District, Bagmati Province
Dhangadhi Sub-Metropolis	Dhangadhi, Kailali, Sudurpashchim Province

=== Personnel and kits ===
Team	Head Coach	Captain	Foreign players	Kit Sponsor
Biratnagar Metropolitan City				
Chandrapur Municipality				
APF FC				Mahindra
Nepal Army FC				
Nepal Police FC				
Waling Municipality				
Lalitpur Metropolis				
Dhangadhi Sub-Metropolis				

== Venues ==
Nepal

Bharatpur	Biratnagar	Kathmandu	Lalitpur
Sharadanagar Football Ground	TBA	Dasarath Rangasala	ANFA Complex
Capacity:		Capacity: 15,000	Capacity: 6,000

== League table ==
Pos	Team	Pld	W	D	L	GF	GA	GD	Pts	Qualification
1	Nepal A.P.F. Club (C)	7	7	0	0	34	4	+30	21	Qualification for 2024–25 AFC Women's Champions League
2	Nepal Police Club	7	5	0	2	14	8	+6	15	
3	Tribhuvan Army F.C.	7	5	0	2	33	4	+29	15	
4	Dhangadhi Sub-Metropolitan City	7	4	0	3	18	19	−1	12	
5	Biratnagar Metropolitan City	7	3	1	3	11	10	+1	10	
6	Lalitpur Metropolitan City	7	1	1	5	3	26	−23	4	
7	Chandrapur Municipality	7	1	1	5	7	21	−14	4	
8	Waling Municipality	7	0	1	6	2	33	−31	1	

Source: ANFA
Rules for classification: 1) Points; 2) Goal difference; 3) Goals scored; 4) head-to-head.
(C) Champions

== Broadcast rights ==
All matches are streamed live on Eleven Sports.
