= 2019 Pokhara Sports Award =

- Location: Pokhara, Nepal
- Country: Nepal

2019 Pokhara Sports Award is the second biggest sports award of Nepal. This is the 4th Pokhara Sports Award.

== Males ==
Player	Sport
Amrit Thapa	Swakwas
Yukesh Gurung	Paragraiding
Rupak Nepali	Karate

== Females ==
Player	Sport
Prity Baral	Soft Tennis
Srya KC	Shooting
Susmi Shrestha	Karate

== Other ==
- Lifetime Achievement Award - Chittda Bahadur Gurung: Boxing

== See also ==
- 2019 Pulsar Sports Award
