= 2019 Pulsar Sports Award =

- Date: 2019 July 02
- Location: Kathmandu
- Country: Nepal
- Hosted by: Bhadrakali Kamaladi

2019 Pulsar Sports Award is the biggest sporting award of Nepal. The 16th edition of the NSJF Sports Award, organised by Nepal Sports Journalists Forum in association with Action Sports and powered by Gold Star, featured 10 categories.

The winners of each category received a Pulsar NS160 motorcycle, while the other contestants received Rs 50,000 each. The winners and nominees also received a DishTV home set top box and gift hampers from Kelme Nepal, while the men's and women's category winners received open-destination tickets from Turkish Airlines.

== Winners and Nominees ==
=== Female players ===
Sabitra Bhandari won the Best Female Player award, with judo player Manita Shrestha Pradhan, cricket player Sita Ranamgar, taekwondo player Nima Gurung and volleyball player Saraswati Chaudhary being nominated.

== See also ==
- 2019 Pokhara Sports Award
