= ANFA Women's League =

Top tier women's association football league in Nepal

- Organising body: ANFA
- Founded: 1998; 28 years ago
- Country: Nepal
- Confederation: AFC
- Number of clubs: 10
- Level on pyramid: 1
- International cup(s): AFC Women's Champions League; SAFF Women's Club Championship
- Current champions: APF FC (7th title) (2024)
- Most championships: APF FC (7 titles)
- Top scorer: Rashmi Ghising (35 goals)
- Broadcaster(s): Action Sports HD; Hamro Khelkud
- Website: www.the-anfa.com
- Current: 2025–26 ANFA Women's League

The ANFA Women's League (Nepali: एन्फा महिला लिग), previously known as National Women's League, is the top division of professional women's club football organized by the All Nepal Football Association in Nepal. APF FC has been the most successful club in the history of the competition, winning it seven times.

== History ==
The top-tier women’s football competition in Nepal began in 1998 under the name Mayor's Cup Women's Football Championship Shield, emphasizing its nationwide scope and grassroots inclusivity. The inaugural edition saw Kathmandu Metropolitan City crowned champions, and in the early 2000s district clubs like Morang FA, Bara FA, and Panchthar FA dominated the scene, reflecting the growing enthusiasm for women’s football.

In 2010, ANFA confirmed the participation of five development region clubs, and the league was renamed to National Women's League. The league’s profile rose significantly with the entry of APF, Nepal Police and Tribhuvan Army, which brought structure and professionalism. Among them, APF emerged as a powerhouse winning seven titles, including a streak of four consecutive championships from 2017 to 2024. Although the league was suspended due to the COVID-19 pandemic, it resumed in 2021.

Following the 2024 season, the league was officially rebranded as the ANFA Women’s League, marking a new chapter in its institutional identity and aligning it more closely with ANFA’s development strategy.

== Clubs ==
=== Current clubs ===
The following are the 10 clubs which compete in the ANFA Women's League 2025–26.

Club	Location	Province	Previous season
Bagmati Youth Club	Bagmati	Madhesh	4th
Church Boys United	Lalitpur	Bagmati	-
APF FC	Kathmandu	Bagmati	1st
Nepal Police FC	Kathmandu	Bagmati	2nd
New Road Team	Kathmandu	Bagmati	-
Sankata FC	Kathmandu	Bagmati	7th
Tribhuvan Army FC	Kathmandu	Bagmati	3rd
Jhapa FC	Jhapa	Koshi	-
RS Resort and Beach Football Club	Pokhara	Gandaki	-

=== All time clubs ===
A total of 10 clubs have participated in the ANFA Women's League since its reformation from 2024–25 season. Clubs playing in the next season are indicated in bold.

ANFA Women's League
ANFA Women's League Qualifiers
National League
Defunct/merged clubs
Operational academies
Reserve team

As of 2025

All-time table season (2024–25)-present
Pos.	Club	S	P	W	D	L	GF	GA	GD	Pts	1st	2nd	3rd	1st App	Last / Recent app	Highest finish
1	**APF Club**	1	19	**18**	1	0	**102**	6	**+96**	**55**	**1**	0	0	2006	2024	1st
2	**Nepal Police**	1	**20**	10	**6**	4	34	16	+18	36	0	1	0	2012	2024	2nd
3	**Tribhuvan Army**	1	19	15	3	4	78	12	+66	48	0	0	1	2012	2024	3rd
4	**Bagmati Youth Club**	1	18	4	2	**12**	14	41	−27	14	0	0	0	2024	2024	4th
5	Waling Municipality	1	17	6	0	11	22	67	−45	18	0	0	0	2021	2024	5th
6	Koshi Province	1	9	4	2	3	15	19	−4	14	0	0	0	2024	2024	6th
7	**Sankata Club**	1	9	2	2	5	10	13	−3	8	0	0	0	2024	2024	7th
8	Chandrapur Municipality	1	9	1	5	3	7	20	−13	8	0	0	0	2021	2024	8th
9	Karnali Province	1	9	1	1	7	4	26	−22	4	0	0	0	2024	2024	9th
10	Sudurpaschim Province	1	9	0	0	9	3	**71**	−68	0	0	0	0	2024	2024	10th
11	**Church Boys United**	0	0	0	0	0	0	0	0	0	0	0	0	2025–26	-	-
12	**Jhapa FC**	0	0	0	0	0	0	0	0	0	0	0	0	2025–26	-	-
13	**New Road Team**	0	0	0	0	0	0	0	0	0	0	0	0	2025–26	-	-
14	**RS Resort and Beach Football Club**	0	0	0	0	0	0	0	0	0	0	0	0	2025–26	-	-

== Champions ==
Season	Winner	Runners-up	Clubs	Ref
Before National Women's League
1998	Kathmandu Metropolitan City	Dharan Municipality	—	
2006	APF FC	Panchthar District FA	23	
2007	Morang District FA	Panchthar District FA	22	
2008	Bara District FA	Rupandehi District FA	10	
2010	APF FC		6	
National Women's League
2013–14	Nepal Police FC	Tribhuvan Army FC	8	
2014–15	Nepal Police FC	Tribhuvan Army FC	8	
2015–16	Nepal Police FC	Tribhuvan Army FC	10	
2017–18	APF FC	Nepal Police FC	8	
~~2020~~	Cancelled due to the COVID-19 pandemic			
2021	APF FC	Tribhuvan Army FC	7	
2022	APF FC	Nepal Police FC	8	
~~2023~~	League not held			
ANFA Women's League
2024–25	APF FC	Nepal Police FC	10	
2025–26	Abandoned due to the ANFA-NSC crisis and FIFA suspension		10	

=== Performance by clubs ===
Club	Titles	Runners–up	Winning seasons	Runners–up seasons
ANFA Women's League
APF FC	1	0	2024–25	—
Nepal Police FC	0	1	—	2024–25
National Women's League
APF FC	6	1	Before 2006, 2006, 2010, 2017–18, 2021, 2022	2012
Nepal Police FC	4	1	2012, 2013–14, 2014–15, 2015–16	2017–18, 2022
Bara District FA	1		2008	
Kathmandu Metropolitan City	1		1998	
Morang District FA	1		2007	
Tribhuvan Army FC		4		2013–14, 2014,15, 2015–16, 2021
Panchthar District FA		2		2006, 2007
Dharan Municipality		1		1998
Rupandehi District FA		1		2008

== Records ==
=== Top goal scorers ===
As of 25 August 2025

Records since the 2024 season

Rank	Player	Seasons	Goals
1	(Nepal) Rashmi Ghising	1	35
2	(Nepal) Chandra Bhandari	1	17
3	(Nepal) Bimala Chaudhary	1	16
4	(Nepal) Sabita Rana Magar	1	11
4	(Nepal) Saru Limbu	1	11
6	(Nepal) Anita K.C.	1	9
6	(Nepal) Anita Basnet	1	9
6	(Nepal) Amisha Karki	1	9
9	(Uganda) Jackline Nassali	1	8
10	(Nepal) Preeti Rai	1	7
10	(Nepal) Dipa Shahi	1	7

=== Top scorers by season ===
Season	Player	Club	Goals
2024–25	(Nepal) Rashmi Ghising	APF FC	35
2025–26	TBD	TBD	TBD
