= Chandra Devi Dahal =

Nepalese footballer

Chandra Dahal
Personal information
- Full name: Chandra Devi Dahal
- Date of birth: 26 October 1986 (age 40)
- Place of birth: Morang, Nepal
- Height: 5 ft 4 in (1.63 m)
- Position: Goalkeeper

Senior career*
| Years | Team | Apps | (Gls) |
- Nepal APF

International career
| 2010– | Nepal | | |
- * Club domestic league appearances and goals

Chandra Devi Dahal (born 26 October 1986 in Morang) is a Nepalese woman footballer who plays for the Nepal APF and the national team.

She represented Nepal at the 2012 SAFF Women's Championship, starting in Nepal's first group game against Pakistan.

Dahal celebrated her birthday just after playing in Nepal's biggest ever win, an 8–0 victory against Kuwait.
