= Renuka Nagarkote =

Nepalese footballer (born 1995)

Personal information
- Date of birth: 16 April 1995 (age 31)
- Place of birth: Nepal
- Position: Midfielder

Senior career*
Years	Team	Apps	(Gls)
2019–2023	APF Club		
2022–2023	Kickstart	10	(1)
2024–2026	APF F.C. (women)		
2026	Kickstart		
2026	Paro WFC		

International career
2010–	Nepal	43	(0)
- * Club domestic league appearances and goals

Renuka Nagarkote (Nepali: रेनुका नगरकोट; born 16 April 1995) is a Nepalese women's professional footballer who plays as a midfielder for the Nepal women's national football team.

== Career ==
At club level, Nagarkote played for APF Club. In 2023, she played for Indian Women's League club Kickstart.

== International career ==
Renuka Nagarkote represents Nepal at the international level. She is the Nepali national team captain.

== International goals ==
Scores and results list Nepal's goal tally first.

List of international goals
No.	Date	Venue	Opponent	Score	Result	Competition
1.	31 May 2026	Jawaharlal Nehru Stadium, Margao, India	Sri Lanka	2–0	2–0	2026 SAFF Women's Championship

== Honours ==
Kickstart

- Indian Women's League runner-up: 2022–23
