= Anjana Rana Magar =

Nepalese association football player

Personal information
- Date of birth: 17 January 2002 (age 24)
- Place of birth: Rautahat, Nepal

Team information
- Current team: APF
- Number: 20

International career
Years	Team	Apps	(Gls)
- Nepal

Anjana Rana Magar (Nepali: अन्जना राना मगर; born 17 January 2002) is a Nepalese professional footballer who plays as a goalkeeper for APF F.C. and the Nepal women's national football team.

== Career ==
In a match against India, in the 2024 SAFF Women's Championship semi-final, she saved two penalties, and Nepal won the match 4-2.
