= Bagmati, Sarlahi =

Bagmati बागमती
- Municipality
- Location in Nepal
- Coordinates: 27.11°N 85.45°E
- Country: Nepal
- Development Region: Central
- District: Sarlahi District
- Province: Province No. 2
- Established: 2016 A.D. (2073 B.S.)

Government
  - Mayor: Bharat Kumar Thapa
  - Deputy Mayor: Lila Kumari Moktan

Area
  - Total: 101.17 km^{2} (39.06 sq mi)

Population (2011)
  - Total: 42,341
  - Density: 418.51/km^{2} (1,083.9/sq mi)
  - Religions: Hindu Muslim Christian

Languages
  - Local: Maithili, Tharu, Nepali, Bhojpuri
- Time zone: UTC+5:45 (NST)
- Postal Code: 45800
- Area code: 046
- Website: www.bagmatimunsarlahi.gov.np

Bagmati is a municipality in Sarlahi District, a part of Province No. 2 in Nepal. It was formed in 2016 occupying current 12 sections (wards) from previous 12 former VDCs. It occupies an area of 101.18 km^{2} with a total population of 42,341.

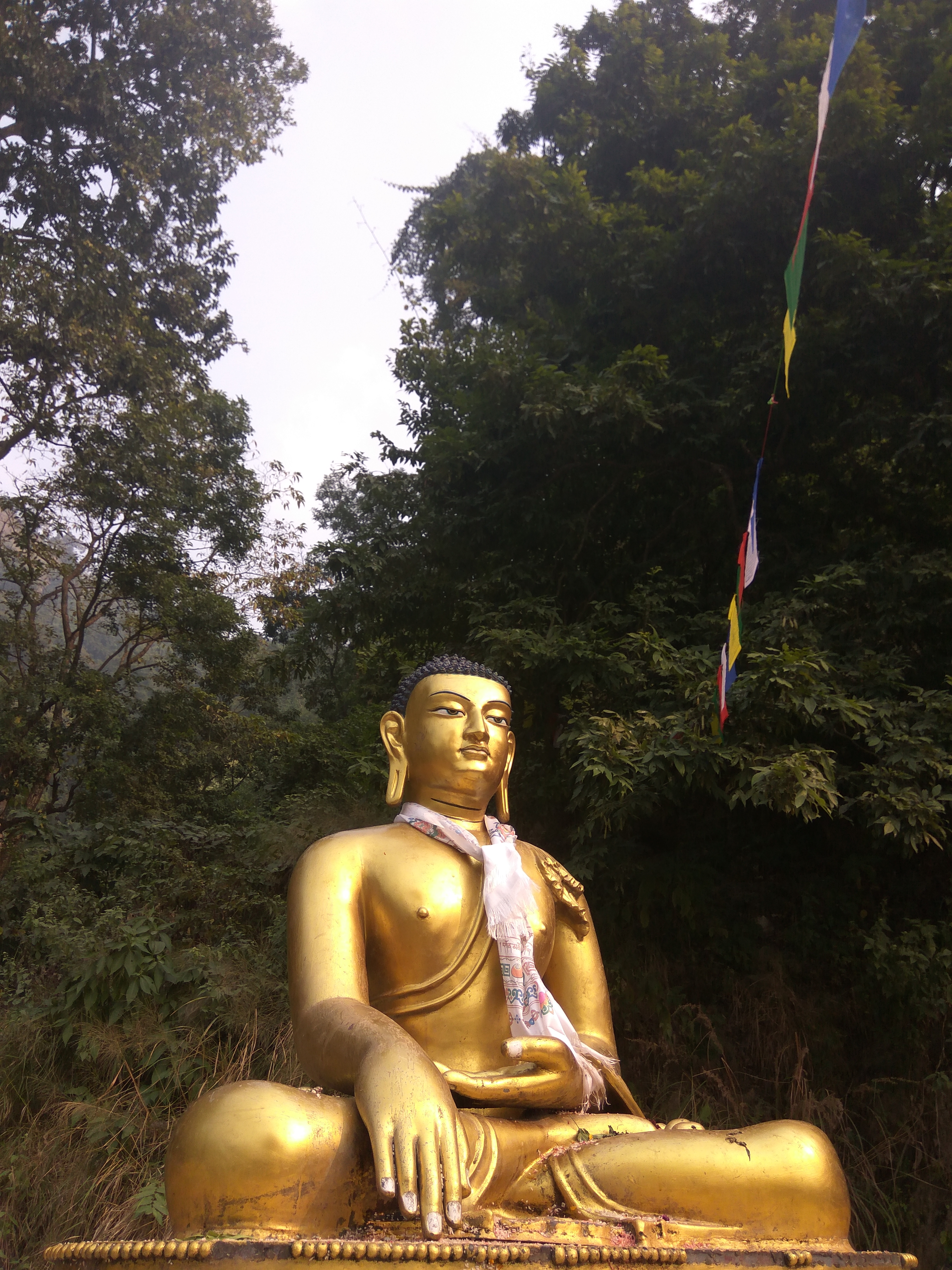
Buddha statue at Karmaihiya, Bagmati, Sarlahi.

== Sports ==
=== Bagmati Club Football Ground ===
Located in Bagmati Municipality, Sarlahi, the Bagmati Club Football Ground serves as the home base for Bagmati Football Club, a rising team in Nepal's football scene. The ground has hosted local tournaments and club events, including jersey handovers and C Division League preparations. It is a vital hub for nurturing grassroots talent and fostering community engagement in Madhesh Province.
