= Nepal Police F.C. (women) =

Nepal Police women's football club of Nepal

Nepal Police Women
- Nickname: The Cops
- Ground: Nepal Police Academy, Maharjgunj, Kathmandu
- Owner: Nepal Police
- Head coach: Bhola Nath Silwal
- League: ANFA National Women's League
- Website: www.nepalpolice.gov.np
Home colours	Away colours

Nepal Police Football Club is a women's professional football section of the Nepal Police Club. It currently competes in the top league in Nepal, the National Women's League.

== History ==
=== Record by season ===
Champions	Runners-up	Third place	Promoted	Relegated

Season	League	Teams	Position	AFC Women's Champions League
2006	NWL			
2007	NWL			
2008	NWL			
2010	NWL			
2012	NWL		1st	
2013–14	NWL		1st	
2014–15	NWL		1st	
2015–15	NWL		1st	
2017–18	NWL	8	2nd	
2021	NWL	7	3rd	
2022	NWL	8	2nd	
2024	NWL	10	2nd	

== Current squad ==
As of 13 August 2025

Note: Flags indicate national team as defined under FIFA eligibility rules; some limited exceptions apply. Players may hold more than one non-FIFA nationality.

No.	Pos.	Nation	Player
22	GK	NEP	Usha Nath
—	GK	NEP	Sapana Rai
4	DF	NEP	Samiksha Ghimire
5	DF	NEP	Amrita Jaishi (captain)
—	DF	NEP	Ghim Kumari Gurung
—	DF	NEP	Rebika Pandey
—	DF	NEP	Monika P Magar
—	DF	NEP	Saru Waiba
—	DF	NEP	Sabina Chaudhary
2	DF	NEP	Puja Rana
—	MF	NEP	Sushma Tamang

No.	Pos.	Nation	Player
—	MF	NEP	Deepa Neupane
—	MF	NEP	Sunkala Rai
—	MF	NEP	Manisha Rawat
—	MF	NEP	Nisha Sunuwar
—	MF	NEP	Ranjita Gurung
—	MF	NEP	Punjali Kusuwar
—	FW	NEP	Anuska Sherpa
—	FW	NEP	Nirmala B.K.
13	FW	NEP	Rekha Poudel
—	FW	NEP	Srijana Khadka
14	FW	NEP	Niru Thapa
—	FW	NEP	Nirmala Upadhyaya

== Technical staff ==
Role	Name
Head coach	(Nepal) Bhola Nath Silwal
Assistant coach	(Nepal) Rabin Shrestha
Team manager	(Nepal) Shrawan Kumar Jha
Assistant	(Nepal) Subash Poudel
Assistant	(Nepal) Gajendra Bahadur Magar
Assistant	(Nepal) Sanjeev Joshi
Physiotherapist	(Nepal) Goma Kumari Shrestha

== Recent Performance ==
In February 2026, Nepal Police was declared the best team of the tournament at the National Women's Football Championship, receiving a cash prize of 50,000. The tournament, organized by ANFA with FIFA assistance, featured 10 teams competing in a knockout format.

The club has also competed in domestic cup competitions. In November 2025, Nepal Police Club recorded a dominant 8–0 victory over Church Boys United in the inaugural Jhapa Women's Gold Cup, advancing to the semi-finals. Mina Deuba scored five goals in that match and was named Player of the Match, while Rekha Poudel completed a hat-trick.
