= Nepal Army F.C. (women) =

Army football club of nepal

Nepal Army Women
- Full name: Nepal Army Women Football Club
- Founded: 2013; 13 years ago
- Ground: Tribhuwan Army Stadium, Bhadrakal; Dasharath Rangasala Stadium
- Capacity: 15,000
- Owner: Nepalese Army
- Manager: Chun Bahadur Thapa
- League: ANFA National Women's League
- Website: www.nepalarmy.mil.np
Home colours	Away colours

Nepal Army Women Football Club (formally known as Tribhuvan Army Women's Club) is a Nepali professional football club from Kathmandu, that competes in the ANFA National Women's League. It is the section of the Nepal Army Club.

== Records by season ==
Season	Teams	Position	AFC Women's Champions League
2017–18	8	4th	—
2021–22	7	2nd	—
2022–23	8	3rd	—
2024–25	10	3rd	—

== Squad ==
As of 9 September 2024

Note: Flags indicate national team as defined under FIFA eligibility rules; some limited exceptions apply. Players may hold more than one non-FIFA nationality.

No.	Pos.	Nation	Player
20	GK	NEP	Anjana Rana Magar
22	GK	NEP	Kopila Khadka
14	DF	NEP	Anchali Waiba (captain)
2	DF	NEP	Bimala BK
29	DF	NEP	Bimala Thapa
24	DF	NEP	Nilam Singh
12	DF	NEP	Nisha Bohora
28	DF	NEP	Sushmita Chaudhary
15	MF	NEP	Bimala Chaudhary
18	MF	NEP	Dipa Rai

No.	Pos.	Nation	Player
23	MF	NEP	Dipa Shahi
7	MF	NEP	Sapana Lama
16	MF	NEP	Sumitra Yonjan
27	MF	NEP	Hima Chaudhary
33	MF	NEP	Sushmita Chaudhary
26	MF	NEP	Pramila Kumari Chaudhary
19	FW	NEP	Amisha Karki
10	FW	NEP	Chandra Bhandari
17	FW	NEP	Anita Lamzel
8	FW	NEP	Sabitri Devi Magar
11	FW	NEP	Sanju Kumal

== Technical staff ==
Role	Name
Manager	(Nepal) Chun Bahadur Thapa
Assistant manager	(Nepal) Tek Bahadur Budhathoki
Goalkeeper coach	(Nepal) Gandip Kumar Khadka
Team manager	(Nepal) Youdha Shahi
Assistant	(Nepal) Kabita Dhimal
Assistant	(Nepal) Kriti Rajbhandari
