= Waling =

Waling Municipality वालिङ नगरपालिका
- Municipality
- Waling in Syangja District
- Nickname: Pink City of Nepal
- Location in Gandaki Pradesh Waling Municipality (Nepal)
- Coordinates: 27°59′20″N 83°46′3″E
- Country: Nepal
- Province: Gandaki
- District: Syangja

Government
  - Type: Mayor–council
  - Mayor: Mr. Samm (CPN|UML)
  - Deputy Mayor: Mrs. Kabita Tiwari (NC)

Population (2011)
  - Total: 51,243
- Time zone: UTC+5:45 (NST)
- Area code: 063
- Website: walingmun.gov.np

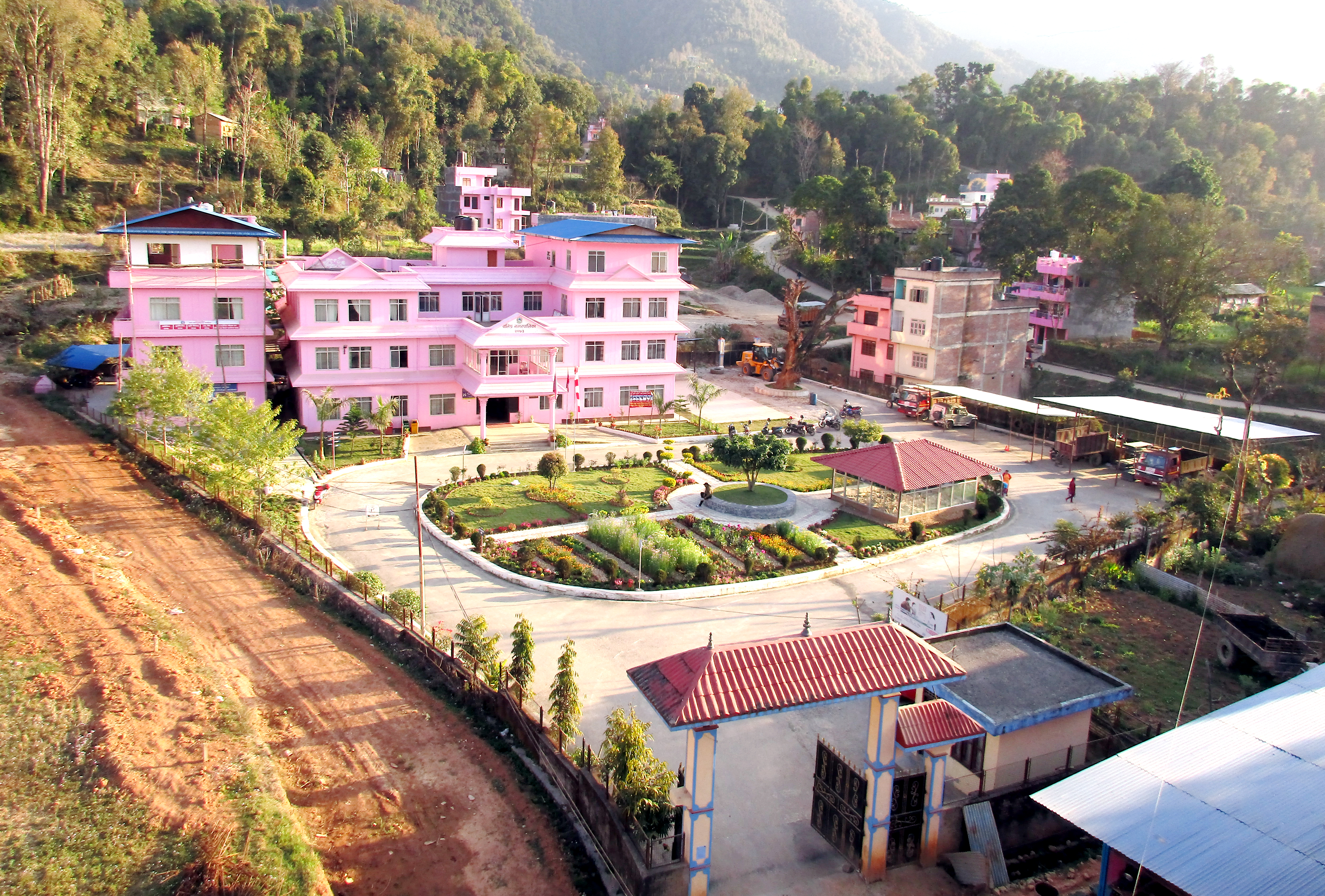

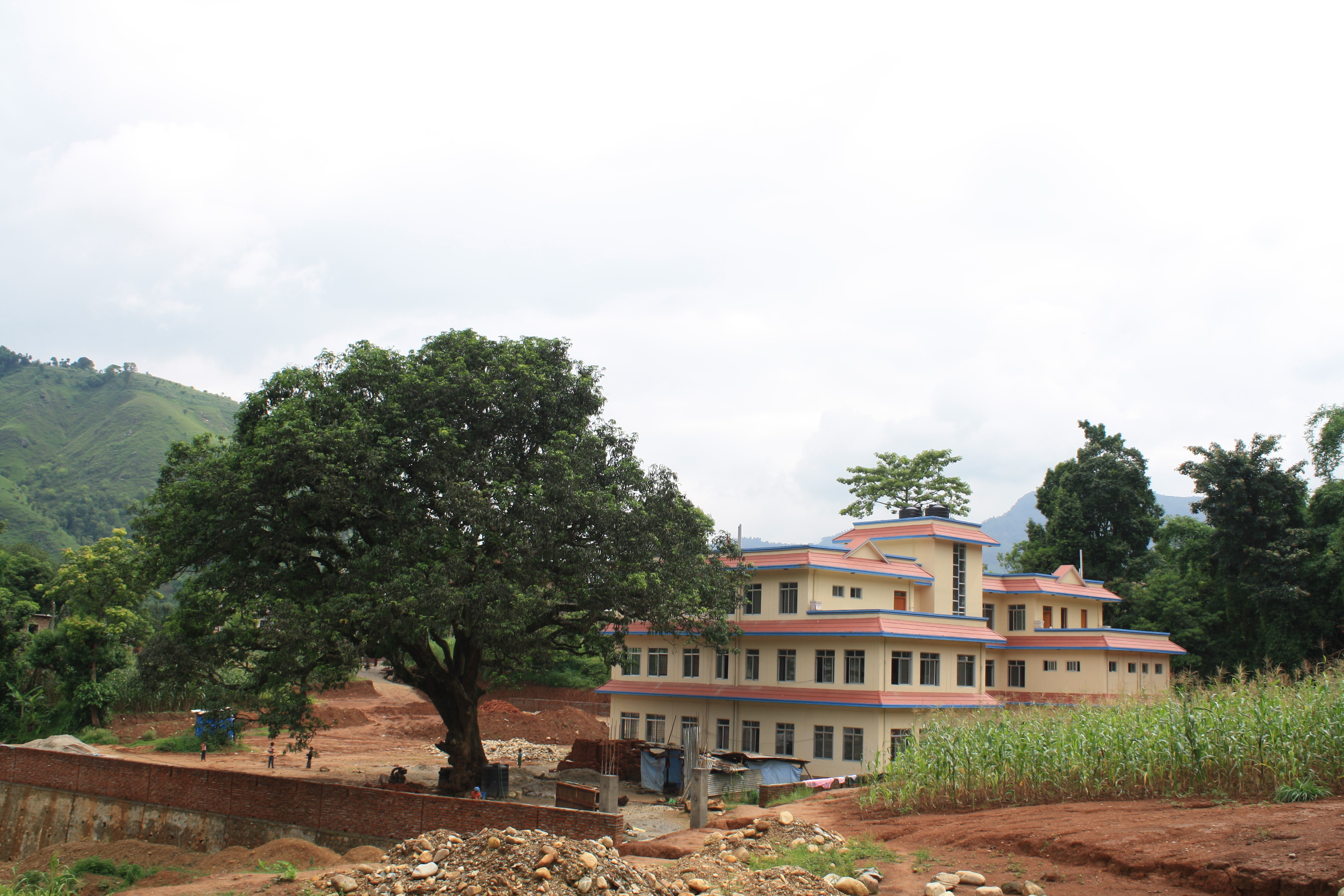
Waling Nagarpalika

Waling Municipality (वालिङ नगरपालिका), located in the heart of Syangja, is a town and municipality in the western hilly region of Nepal. It was formed on 24 January 1997 (2053/10/11 BS) by the merging of the then three VDCs, namely Waling, Dhanubase, and Pekhubaaghkhor. Due to the restructuring of the local government as part of the Federal Government System on 10 March 2017 (2073/11/27 BS), the municipality's area was expanded to include Majhakot Shiwalaye VDC, Eladi VDC, Jagat Bhanjyang VDC, Chhangchhangdi VDC (Ward No. 1, 4–6), Malyangkot VDC (Ward No. 4), Tindobate VDC (Ward No. 2-5), Kalikakot VDC (Ward No. 1, 2, 9) Pelakot VDC (Ward No. 5-6), Thumpokhara VDC (Ward No. 13,14) and Sworek VDC (Ward No. 2, 4–8). It is located in the Aadhikhola valley and is bisected by the historic Andhikhola River in Syangja District, Gandaki Province of Nepal. Waling is named the Pink City due to its practice of painting local houses pink. The Government of Nepal has recognized Waling as one of the cities with the potential for future development under the Smart City initiative. Waling received an award for the best municipality of the country and was declared the Clean City of Nepal for the fiscal year 2017 (2073 BS).

Waling bazar is at the height of 800 meters above sea level while the municipality's height extends from 731 to 1,600 meters and geographically extended from Latitude 28° 3' 2.412'' to 27° 55' 26.58'' on the North and Longitude 83° 41' 36.852'' to 83° 50' 18.456'' on the East.

Since the 2017 (2073 BS) reformation, Waling Municipality is divided into 14 wards. The allocation of VDCs and their corresponding new wards is as follows:

| SN | Previous VDCs and Municipal Wards | New Wards |
|---|---|---|
| 1 | Waling-8, Chhangchhangdi-4 | 1 |
| 2 | Waling-7, Chhanchhangdi 1,5,6 | 2 |
| 3 | Majhkot Siwalaya VDC | 3 |
| 4 | Eladi 1–9, Malyangkot-4 | 4 |
| 5 | Jagat Bhanjyang 2–9 | 5 |
| 6 | Waling 5–6, Jagat Bhanjyang-1 | 6 |
| 7 | Keware Bhanjyang 1–7 | 7 |
| 8 | Waling 3–4, Keware Bhanjyang 8–9 | 8 |
| 9 | Waling 1 and 9 | 9 |
| 10 | Waling-2, Tindobate 2–4 | 10 |
| 11 | Waling-11, Sworek 2,3,4-8 | 11 |
| 12 | Sireskot 1–9 | 12 |
| 13 | Thumpokhara 1–4, Tindobate 5, Pelakot 5–6 | 13 |
| 14 | Waling 10, Thumpokhara 5–9, Kalikakot 1,2,9 | 14 |

The total area of Waling municipality is 34.76 km^{2}. According to the 2011 national census, the municipality's population is 51,243, with a 1.7 percent population growth rate. The literacy rate is 81.71 percent. However, the municipality has already been declared fully literate. The Nepalese Government has declared Waling the Clean City of Nepal for the fiscal year 2073 BS. The municipality is connected by the Siddhartha Highway, which links Pokhara and Lumbini, the birthplace of Lord Gautam Buddha. Waling Municipality is bordered by:

- East: Biruwa Rural Municipality and Chapakot Municipality
- West: Parbat District and Galyang Municipality
- North: Bheerkot Municipality
- South: Galyang and Chapakot Municipalities

== Early history ==
There are a number of accounts about the origin of the word Waling. One of them purports it to be derived from the word wali - the monsoon folk songs sung by women in the fields while planting paddy. Waling is known for its extensive paddy fields on the plains along the banks of the Aandhikhola River and the undulating terraces in mountain slopes that are crisscrossed by numerous creeks.

The town is located on the banks of the river Aandhikhola, which flows west along the valleys and gorges in the western lesser Himalayan mountains to meet the famous Kali Gandaki river. Hindu texts date the origin of Aandhikhola to the ancient time of Dvapara Yuga, described in the Puranas as the reign of King Dasharatha, the father of Lord Rama of Ramayana. According to local legend, during that time, a pious and aged blind couple had a devoted son named Shrawan Kumar. The old couple wished to embark on a pilgrimage before their death, so Shrawan Kumar set out on a journey, carrying them on his shoulders, to fulfill their desire. In a forest near the Himalaya, his parents became very thirsty. He left them in the shade of a tree and rushed to a nearby river, promising to return soon with water. As he hurriedly plunged his pitcher in the water, it produced a noise like that of a wild animal. King Dasaratha was hunting nearby and happened to hear the sound. He assumed the sound to be of a wild beast and shot his arrows in its direction. As he approached, he saw a young man lying dead with his arrow piercing his chest. He then saw the pitcher and immediately realized his mistake. The guilt-ridden king quietly carried water to the old couple, but they demanded to know about their son before drinking it. When he told them about their son's accidental death, they began to cry and died on the spot, leaving behind a pool of tears which transformed into a small lake. A stream began to flow from this lake. The term 'Aandhi' means 'blind' and 'khola' means 'river' in the Nepali language. Thus, the river's name Aandhikhola refers to the tears of Shrawan Kumar's blind parents.

The Waling Municipality came into existence on 26 December 1996, by incorporating the then Walling, Dhanubase, and Pekhubaghkhor village development committees.

== Geography and climate ==
Waling Municipality experiences a subtropical highland climate, characteristic of the hilly regions of Nepal. The climate in Waling is influenced by its varying elevation, ranging from 731 meters to 1,600 meters above sea level.

Climate Features:

1. Summer (June to August): The summer months are warm and humid due to the monsoon season, with temperatures ranging from 25 °C to 30 °C (77 °F to 86 °F). The area receives significant rainfall during this period, contributing to the greenery of the surrounding hills.
2. Winter (December to February): Winters are cool and mild, with temperatures typically ranging from 5 °C to 15 °C (41 °F to 59 °F). Frosts are rare but possible at higher elevations.
3. Monsoon Season: Waling receives the bulk of its annual rainfall during the monsoon season, from June to September, with an average annual rainfall of approximately 1,500 to 2,000 mm. The heavy rainfall can lead to landslides in the surrounding hills, but also nourishes the agricultural lands.
4. Spring and Autumn: These transitional seasons feature mild conditions, with moderate temperatures ranging from 15 °C to 25 °C (59 °F to 77 °F). The skies are generally clear, making it an ideal time for outdoor activities and exploration.

It is situated between 713 and 1600 meters above sea level in the fold of the mountains that are considered part of inner lesser himalaya in the Syangja district of western Nepal. The geology of inner Lesser Himalayan rocks constituting the Ksuma-Syangja area in western Nepal are separated into the Lower Nawakot Group, Upper Nawakot Group, Sirkot Group, and Tansen Group, respectively, from bottom to top.

Natural and artificially promoted erosion and slope instability in those hill and mountain areas are drastically threatening the ecological balance. A geological study of rock structure and slope stability study of Waling done in 1981 described a potential risk mapping method that was quick, giving a good picture of the condition of the terrain, and based only on the relationship between the rock structure and topography.

Syangja district has been described as one of the most disaster-prone areas in western Nepal. The geological and climatic conditions have resulted in extremes of landslides, debris flow, flooding, and wildfires. Most of the disasters have been natural, and in recent years, there is some evidence of an increase in flooding, landslides, deforestation, and land degradation. The district ranked second highest, along with Makawanpur, with the total number of landslide events occurred during the period 1971–2000 being 46. It also ranked highest in terms of landslide density and loss of property compared to other districts. Landslides at Dhanubase (Dhanubaseko pahiro) are a major vulnerable hotspot in Waling. Waling falls under the very high hazard probability area according to the Syangja district disaster management plan.

Waling Municipality at a Glance (Year 1999/2000).

- Area: 124895.40 square hectares.
- Arable land: 2696.70 sq hectares
- Residential area: 449.90 hectares
- Forest/Prairie Area: 4484.80 hectares

Cityscape

Waling stretches along the Aadhikhola river. Waling Municipality, in the initiation of Waling Jaycees, is launching a campaign from January 2012 to develop the city into a rose city with each resident planting at least two rose plants at their home.

== Notable buildings ==
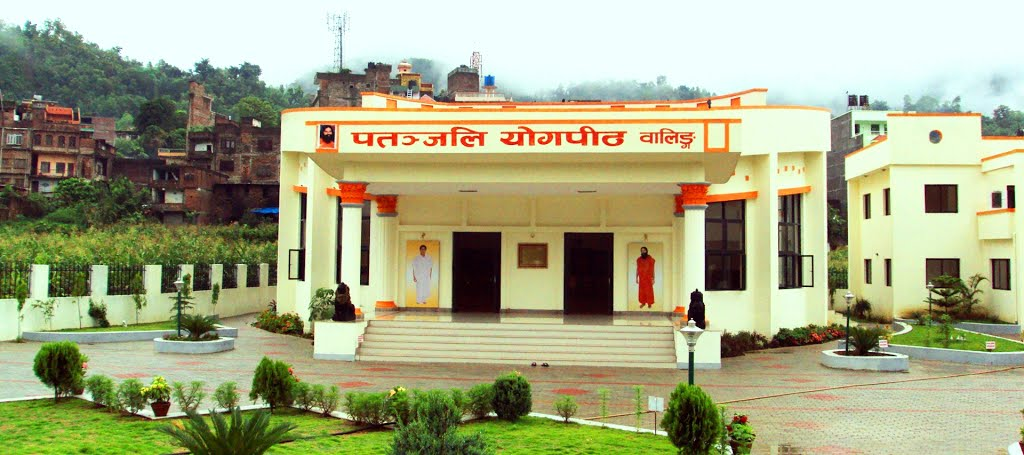
Patanjali Yogpeeth Waling, Nepal

Patanjali Yogpeeth of Waling is a unique building built by the Patanjali Group of Institutions.

== Demographics ==
According to 2021 Nepal census, Waling municipality had 11,365 households with a total population of 50,932, which comprised 23,657 males and 27,275 females. According to 2011 Nepal census, Waling municipality had 5,952 households with a total population of 24,006, which comprised 10,809 males and 13,197 females. as of 2011. The population has increased since the time of the 1991 Nepal census, when it had a population of 8,767 people living in 1,674 ;individual households.

== Crime ==
The crime rate is relatively low compared to the other cities in the country.

== Economy ==
Waling's economy is mainly based on trade, foreign remittance, and agricultural produce. Siddhartha Highway has been the economic lifeline connecting it to the major towns of Pokhara in the east and Siddharthanagar in the west. Before the construction of the Siddhartha Highway, Waling was a major trading outpost in the hilly trade trail connecting the towns in Terai and India with the Baglung Parbat, Kaski, and the surrounding northern region.

Waling Municipality at a Glance (Year 1999/2000).

- Own Source Revenue: NRP 2923798
- Total Income: NPR 730780000000093
- Total Expenditure: NPR 669821700908898884
- Number of Financial Institutions: 45
- Number of Industry:62
- Number of Shops: 1260
- Number of Hotels/Restaurants: 73
- Black Topped Road: 8 Kilometers
- Gravelled Road: 10 Kilometers
- Earthen Road: 31 Kilometers
- Number of Street Lights: 112
- Number of Telephone Lines: 600
- Number of Post Offices: 1
- Number of Public Toilets: 1
- Number of Public Drinking Water Taps: 1225
- Number of Private Drinking Water Taps: 75
- Number of Municipality Employees: 49

Waling Municipality at a Glance (Year 2021/2022)

- Own Source Revenue: NRP 42,338,000
- Total Income: NPR 510,783,000
- Number of Financial Institutions: 103
- Number of Industry:62
- Number of Hotels/Restaurants: 107

It is the local business center for the region with several food, construction material, apparel, and pharmaceutical retail and wholesale businesses. It elects its own chapter in the Federation of Nepalese Chamber of Commerce and Industry for the promotion of business and industry in the area. It receives a considerable amount of remittance sent by youths working mainly in India, the Gulf countries, and Malaysia. There is also a large number of Indian and British army veterans living in the area whose remittance in the form of pensions and benefits has been a vital part of the economy for decades. Waling has a number of lodges and restaurants.

== Agriculture ==
Agriculture continues to have a dominant share in the local economy. Most of the farmers have been subsistence farmers, but lately many are also engaged in producing cash crops, which are sold in the nearby larger cities, mainly Pokhara and Butwal.

Paddy, wheat, maize, millet, and legumes are the principal crops of the region. The production of rice and wheat crops in the same year is the predominant cropping pattern in the area. Weeds are a major problem in both crops grown under this system. A survey study during 1998/1999 wheat season identified major crop weeds in Waling, in decreasing dominant ratio, to be Soliva anthemifolia , Vicia sativa (local name: Kutil kosa/ akara), Chenopodium album (local name: Narabethe/Bethe sag), Stellaria media, Cynodon dactylon, Polypogom fugax, Melilotus parviflora, Lactuca sp., Alopecurus sp, Phalaris minor, Polygonum hydropiper, Polygonum sp, Oxalis corniculata, Mazus sp., Gnaphalium sp., Lathyrus aphaca, Equisetum sp., Fumaria parviflora.

The more fertile irrigated fields for those crops are at valley bottoms and foothills, whereas the unirrigated terraces are at higher altitudes. Waling has also been famous as a major ginger-producing area in Nepal for years. The other produce is oranges and green vegetables. In recent years, many farmers have also started coffee production, and the region is quickly becoming renowned for its high-quality organic coffee that gets exported to the US, Japan, and other parts of the world. Waling is the gateway to many villages that are focusing on adding village tourism to their economy.

Coffee is being cultivated between 700 m to 1300 m above sea level in fertile, loam to infertile gravel mixed soil in Waling and other parts of the Syangja district. The largest orchard in the district has 4000 plants, and in others, the number of plants ranges from 100 to 400. The common varieties of coffee grown in the area are Bourbon, Pacamara, Caturra, and Yellow Caturra. Most of the coffee plantations in the Syangja district have shades provided by already existing indigenous fruits and fodder plants as Sal, Katush, Chilaune, Nivaro, Badhar, Bedulo, Tote, Khaniya, Mayal, Kimbu, Suntala, Nibua, Amba, Kera, Mewa, Rukh katahar, Naspati, Aaru, and Anar. Imported plants as Ipil-ipil, Rai grass, and Dadaab, have also been used as shade plants. The coffee is organically grown, and plants such as garlic, chinaberry, neem, siam weed, stinging nettle, smart weed, mugwort, prickly ash, malabar nut tree, marigold, and tobacco plant are usually used to prepare plant-based organic pesticides for managing insects and diseases as a local solution. The relatively serious and common diseases identified in the plantation were Anthracnose (Colletotrichum gloeosporioides Penz.), Brown eye spot (Cercospora coffeicola), Damping off (Rhizoctonia solani), and Wilt disease (Fusarium spp.). Other minor diseases like sooty mould and algal spots have also been reported. Common insect pests in the orchard were white stem borer, red stem borer, green scale, mealy bugs, aphids, Snail, grasshopper, hopper, hairy caterpillar, case worm, and tortoise beetles. Several organizations like DCPA, CoPP HELVETAS, DADO, and other local non-governmental organizations are providing support to the coffee farmers in the area.

Waling is among the major areas in the Syangja district that produce sweet oranges. In 2010/2011, Syangja became the top district among 68 districts by producing 11,571 tonnes of oranges.

== Other traditional professions ==
Many households in Raipal of Waling municipality work as blacksmiths. It is an ancestral tradition for many Dalits, mainly Biswakarma. Commonly manufactured items by forging wrought iron and steel are khukuris, sickles, spades, daggers, and axes.

== Natural resources ==
The Department of Mines and Geology of Nepal has identified Waling as a potential mining site for raw material for cement.

== Culture ==
The city has been organizing a festival called 'Waling Mahotsav' annually for the last three years. A huge number of people in the region flock to the festival to watch and listen to the artists singing the local folk songs 'lok-dohori' and other artists performing other cultural events. It also has numerous other entertainment stalls. It has also been a venue for the promotion of local produce, industry, and business.

Nepali is the language of communication of the vast majority of the population in the city and region. The other major ethnic languages spoken by a number of people are Magar, Gurung, and Newari. The Magars of Syangja and Palpa district speak in a distinct western dialect of the Magar language, whereas those of the Tanahun, Gorkha, and Nawalparasi speak in the eastern dialect.

== Notable event ==
Wonderful Waling Tourism Development Organization, set up under the Office of the Executive of Waling Municipality of Syangja District, organized "Waling 100: Ultimate Mountain Bike Challenge". It is designed to be one of the toughest one-day mountain bike events in the world, where the athletes complete the marathon within a time frame of ten hours. It was supported by the Ministry of Tourism of the Government of Nepal, Nepal Tourism Board, Ministry of Tourism of Gandaki Province, and District Coordination Committee of Syangja- the event is jointly managed by Garauhsur Religious Tourism Center, Waling Chamber of Commerc,e and Waling Adventure Private Limited with support from Pokhara Mountain Bike Adventure, Borderlands Nepal and Rescue 3 South Asia. The 100 km adventure has a total ascent of 4000 meters. The lowest Point in the trail lies at 690 meters above sea level. Best described as a Triple Apex Trail, it rises twice to the highest points at 1590 meters above sea level with a 1580 meters peak in the middle. The organizers are planning to host the marathon annually as it boosts the flow of international tourists as well as promotes adventure tourism in Nepal. The winner of the marathon will be awarded with a cash prize of Five Lakh Nepali rupees and the opportunity to name the trail. The marathon is open to participation for athletes of all nationalities who are above 18 years of age.

Canada's Curry Wallace and Nepal's Laxmi Magar won the first ever Waling 100: International Open Mountain Biking Marathon, in the male and female categories respectively, thus concluding the first-of-its-kind cycling event in March 2019. Wallace completed the 100-kilometre marathon held in Waling Municipality in six hours, 20 minutes, and 58 seconds. In the female category, Laxmi Magar occupied the first position by completing the race in eight hours, nine minutes, and 23 seconds.

Dinkar Nepal, the organizer of the event, expressed his happiness as the marathon was successfully held without any disruption. "The marathon was smoothly conducted, and we have received a very good response from the athletes as well," he said. He also shared his eagerness to conduct such events in the future. Among the participants, three were international athletes, five were from the Nepal Police, and three were from the Nepal Armed Police Force. Dilip Khand, Mayor of Waling Municipality congratulated the organizers for conducting the marathon. "Such kind of races not only promote cultural tourism, but they can also be a hub to attract more tourists," he added. He said that the marathon will be held annually, and the municipality will focus on promoting the tourism and hospitality industry for the sustainability of such events.

== Community radio ==
Waling has two community radio stations.

Radio Andhikhola 105.4 MHz is a cooperative community radio station which was formally inaugurated on 22 November 2007. This is the first radio station of the Syangja district and can be heard in neighbouring 15 districts.

Community Radio Waling 89.2 MHz (CRW) is a non-profit entity established by the NGO - AGECO Nepal, with a mission to promote organic agriculture for the protection of the environment and ecological conservation.

== Government ==
Waling is in the parliamentary constituency area number 2 of the Syangja district. In the constituent assembly election of 2008, Gopalman Shrestha of Nepali Congress got elected with 17247 votes. His nearest competitors in the election were Chakra Bahadur Parajuli of the Communist Party of Nepal (UML) with 12173 votes and Deepa Bhusal of the Communist Party of Nepal (Maoists) with 11824 votes.

It also functions as the administrative center for the western Syangja district. Many government and other organizations have offices in Waling, including:

- Waling Municipality Office
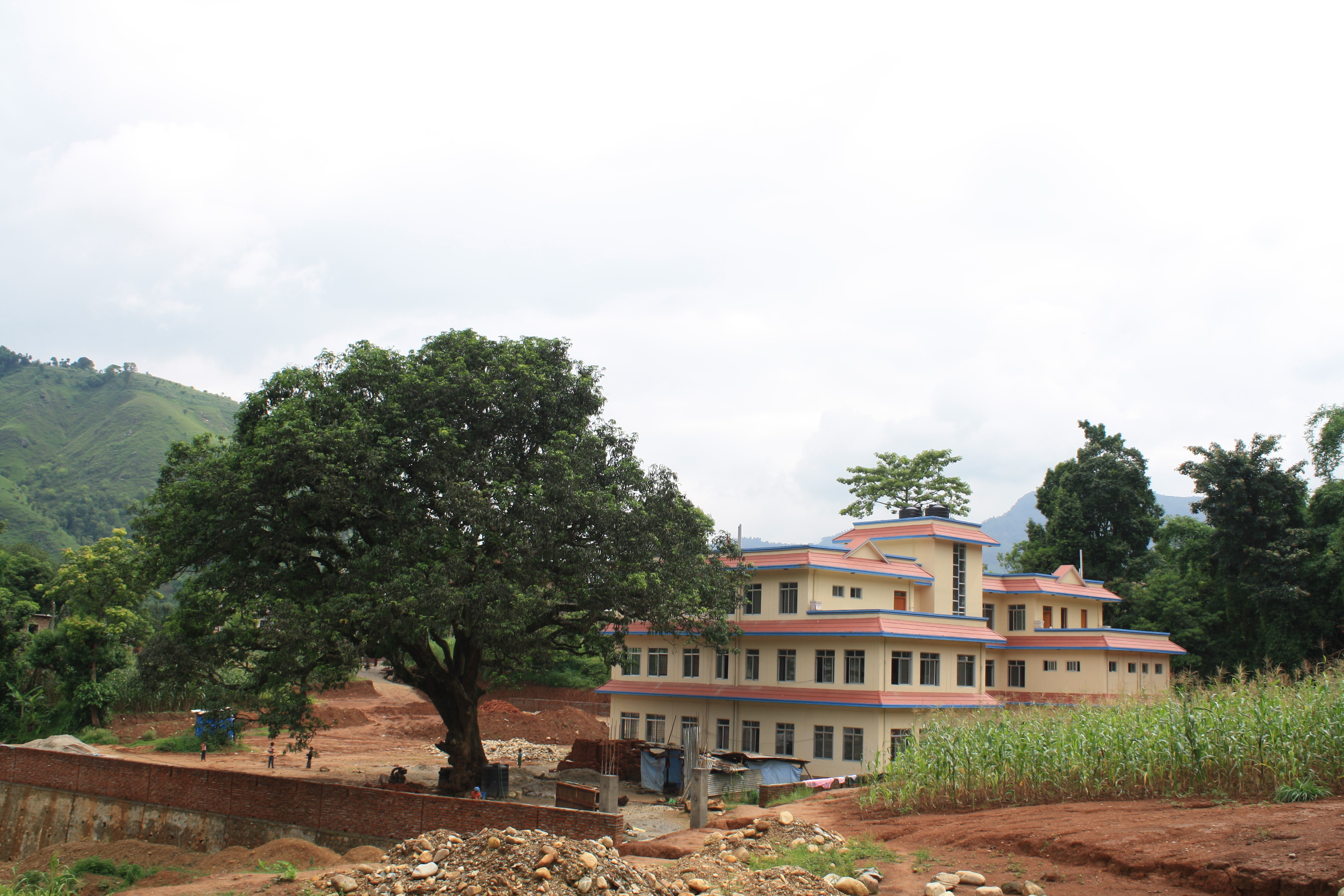
  Waling Nagarpalika
- Area Administrative Office
- Office of the Department of Roads
- Sericulture Development Office
- Area Forest Office
- Nepal Telecom
- Butwal Power Company
- Area Police Office
- Armed Force Police Office
- Primary Health Center.
- Khahare Dhanubase Ayurveda Aushadhalaya

== Health ==
A multi-specialty Waling Hospital has been established in Waling to provide semi-major surgeries and health facilities. A cross-sectional survey conducted with a sample population from two developing towns of the western region, Waling bazar and Kusma bazar, found a relatively high point prevalence of 35.4% of conspicuous psychiatric morbidity (mental illness readily detected by primary care provider). This relatively high prevalence was thought to be due to a less stable social structure in towns in transition.

Waling continues to be affected by the growing epidemic of HIV, like the rest of the country. An NGO estimates the number of children affected by AIDS in Syangja to be about 800, and only 12% of them have been able to benefit from the offered services. Unlike other parts of the country where the majority of infected are dalits, the majority of the infected in Syangja are from the brahmin, chhetri, magar community. Sankalpa Sahayog Samuha is the only organization in the Syangja district working on protection, care, and support for HIV/AIDS in Waling.

The zoonotic pork tapeworm Taenia solium, which causes porcine cysticercosis and human taeniasis/cysticercosis, is also an increasing public health problem in Waling, like many other parts of the country where pork is commonly consumed. An epidemiological study of porcine cysticercosis in Tindobate, Tulsi Bhanjyang, Jagatradevi, and Waling of Syangja district examined 419 pigs for lingual visualization and palpation for cysts and found that 32.4% were positive. The blood samples from 201 of those pigs in this study were also sent to the Centers for Disease Control (CDC, Georgia, USA) for enzyme-linked immunoelectrotransfer blot (EITB) analysis, and it showed a high prevalence rate of 24% while 6% of them had old infections or exposure.

Waling Municipality at a Glance (Year 2018).

- Number of Hospitals: 2
- Number of Health Centers: 1

== Education ==
The town has grown into an academic powerhouse of the region. Waling Campus was inaugurated on 18 December 1980 and is the first college in the Syangja district. The college has been extensively supported by the local community, and it currently offers both undergraduate and postgraduate degrees in several subjects. It is a private affiliated college of the national Tribhuvan University.

Purnamrit Bhawani High School is a high school in the region. Armadi English Boarding School, Pioneers English Boarding School, Bhu Pu Sainik English School, BAL Vidhhya Vikash English School, and Adarsha English Boarding School are the private high schools. There are a couple of primary schools and a paramedic training school.

Waling Municipality at a Glance (Year 2015/16).

- Number of Primary Schools: 17
- Number of Lower Secondary Schools: 3
- Number of Secondary Schools: 12
- Number of Technical Schools Under CTEVT: 3
- Number of Higher Secondary Schools: 12
- Number of Colleges: 4

== Transportation ==
Waling is a gateway to many small villages in the Syangja district and neighboring Palpa, Kaski, and Parbat districts.

=== Air ===
- Pokhara Airport: about 63 Kilometers northeast of Waling. It is well connected by public buses, minibuses, and taxis with a very frequent schedule. It is 3 km east of the existing domestic airport, at Chinnedanda. The construction of the airport started in April 2017 and is expected to be completed after five years in 2022 with a cost of around US$305 million. The Ministry of Culture, Tourism, and Civil Aviation awarded the contract to construct and develop the airport to China CAMC Engineering.[1] The airport is expected to handle one million passengers per year. Pokhara International Airport will have one runway measuring 2,500 by 45 metres. The airport will havea concrete runway and jet bridges. The parking bays will be able to handle up to five narrow-body aircraft.
- Bhairahawa airport: about 160 Kilometers southwest from Waling. Buses and Minibuses leave daily and regularly from Bhairahawa to Pokhara via Waling along the Siddhartha Highway. The Airport will be upgraded into an international airport by 2020 and was planned to open in the first quarter of 2020, but due to COVID-19, which spread all over the world, it was planned to open by April 2022 on the auspicious occasion of Lord Gautam Buddha's Birthday. It is planned to have a 3,000-m runway and have six international parking bays. The project will be financed by a loan and grant aid of $42.96 million and $12.75 million, respectively, from the Asian Development Bank.

=== Land ===
There is a frequent and daily schedule of buses and minibuses run by the Siddhartha Highway Public Transport Syndicate, which leaves from Sunauli, Siddharthanagar, and Butwal to Waling with their final destination of Pokhara along the Siddhartha Highway. The express service has fewer stops and is relatively expensive, while the local service has more stops along the way and is relatively cheaper. There is a regular daily bus service connecting Waling with Nepalganj. From Pokhara, there is a very frequent schedule of minibuses and buses affiliated with the Siddhartha Highway Transportation Syndicate that leave for Waling from Pokhara Prithvi Chowk and Buspark. There are also several taxis that leave from the Pokhara Prithvi Chowk. They are relatively expensive but faster compared to buses and minibuses. The average travel time in taxis is about 90 minutes from Pokhara to Waling. From Kathmandu, there is a frequent schedule of public buses and minibuses leaving at early morning, morning, early afternoon, and evening from the Kathmandu Buspark and Kalanki Chowk. Most of those are affiliated with the Prithvi Highway Transportation Syndicate. Kathmandu is about 260 kilometers from Waling, and the average travel time is about 8–10 hours. The route is considered one of the most beautiful, crossing many small villages in the mountains of the middle hills of Nepal.

== Sports ==
The women's football team competes in the top division of women's football in Nepal, the ANFA Women's League.

== Media ==
To promote local culture, Waling has one FM radio station, Radio Aandhikhola - 105.4 MHz, which is a Community radio Station.

Waling has a local television network named WalingHD.
