= Saru Limbu =

Nepalese footballer (born 1999)

Personal information
- Date of birth: 6 March 1999 (age 27)
- Place of birth: Morang, Nepal
- Position: Midfielder

Senior career*
| Years | Team | Apps | (Gls) |
| 2016–2022 | APF | | (20) |
| 2021 | Masha United | 4 | (19) |
| 2022–2023 | Kickstart | 10 | (7) |
| 2023–2026 | APF | | |
| 2026 | Kickstart | | |
| 2026 | Paro WFC | | |

International career
| 2016– | Nepal | 22 | (3) |
- * Club domestic league appearances and goals

Saru Limbu (Nepali: सरु लिम्बु; born 6 March 1999) is a Nepalese women's professional footballer who plays as a midfielder for the Nepali national team.

== Early life ==
Growing up in her hometown in Morang District, Limbu used to watch local football matches, and her friends and cousins influenced her to play football. After playing for New Star, she attracted the attention of bigger clubs including Nepal A.P.F. Club.

== Career ==
In 2016, APF offered her a contract. When she joined APF, key players such as Anu Lama and Sajana Rana were injured, so Limbu got an immediate chance to play. After a dominant performance in the Chief of Army Staff Cup, she was called up to Nepal women's national football team. After consistently performing well at club level and in closed camps, she was selected for Nepal's squad for the 2016 SAFF Women's Championship. Limbu also captained Nepal's under-18 women's team at the 2018 SAFF U-18 Women's Championship. Limbu was one of four Nepal national team players recruited to play in the 2021 edition of Pakistan's National Women Football Championship, for Masha United in Karachi. The side finished top of its group, scoring 60 goals in four matches. These included a 19–0 win over Sialkot (Limbu scoring 10 goals), a 4–0 triumph over Higher Education Commission, a 35–0 victory over Karachi (Limbu again scoring 10), and a 2–2 draw with Karachi United. They reached the semi-finals before the tournament was cancelled. She returned to play in Nepal's domestic league for Nepal A.P.F. Club.

== International goals ==
As of match played on 21 October 2024

Appearances and goals by year
| National team | Year | Apps | Goals |
|---|---|---|---|
Nepal
| Nepal | 2021 | | 1 |
| Nepal | 2024 | | 0 |
| Nepal | 2025 | | 1 |
| Total | | | 2 |

Scores and results list Nepal's goal tally first, score column indicates score after each Limbu goal.

| No. | Date | Venue | Opponent | Score | Result | Competition |
|---|---|---|---|---|---|---|
| 1. | 12 September 2022 | Dasharath Rangasala, Kathmandu, Nepal | Sri Lanka | 2–0 | 6–0 | 2022 SAFF Women's Championship |
| 2. | 29 June 2025 | Milliy Stadium, Tashkent, Uzbekistan | Laos | 3–0 | 9–0 | 2026 AFC Women's Asian Cup qualification |

== Honours ==
Kickstart

- Indian Women's League runner-up: 2022–23

Individual

| Year | Tournament | Award |
|---|---|---|
| | COAS International Women Football Tournament | Best midfielder |
| | Chief Minister BYC Women Gold Cup | Best midfielder |
| 2021 | National Women League | Most Valuable Player |
