= List of second division football clubs in AFC countries =

AFC countries on this map of the world's six football confederations.

The List of second division football clubs in Asian Football Confederation (AFC) countries.

- For clubs playing at top divisions, see List of top-division football clubs in AFC countries.
- For clubs belonging to any of the other five continental football confederations of the world, see List of association football clubs.

== Bangladesh ==
- Football association: Bangladesh Football Federation
- Second-level league: Bangladesh Championship League

As of 2023–24 season:

	Club	Location
1	BFF Elite Football Academy	Dhaka
2	Dhaka Wanderers Club	Dhaka
3	Farashganj SC	Dhaka
4	Fakirerpool YMC	Dhaka
5	NoFeL Sporting Club	Noakhali
6	PWD Sports Club	Dhaka
7	Uttara FC	Dhaka
8	Wari Club	Dhaka

== Cambodia ==
- Football association: Football Federation of Cambodia
- Second-level league: Cambodian League 2

As of 2023-24 season:

	Club	Location
1	Bati Academy	Takéo
2	ISI Dangkor Senchey B	Phnom Penh
3	Siem Reap FC	Siem Reap
4	Tiffy Army B	Phnom Penh
5	Visakha B	Phnom Penh

== China ==
- Football association: Chinese Football Association
- Second-level league: China League One
Locations of the 2026 China League One teams

As of 2026 season:

Team	City
Meizhou Hakka	Wuhua
Changchun Yatai	Changchun
Guangdong GZ-Power	Guangzhou
Yanbian Longding	Yanji
Shijiazhuang Gongfu	Shijiazhuang
Jiangxi Dingnan United	Dingnan
Nantong Zhiyun	Rugao
Dalian K'un City	Dalian
Shaanxi Union	Xi'an
Suzhou Dongwu	Suzhou
Nanjing City	Nanjing
Ningbo	Ningbo
Foshan Nanshi	Foshan
Shenzhen Juniors	Shenzhen
Guangxi Hengchen	Nanning
Wuxi Wugo	Wuxi

== Chinese Taipei ==
See Chinese Taipei for the naming issue.

- Football association: Chinese Taipei Football Association
- Top-level league: Taiwan Second Division Football League

As of 2024 season:

	Club	Location
1	Inter Taoyuan FC	Taoyuan
2	MCU Desafino	Taipei
3	NUK Kuo Kuang	Kaohsiung
4	Sunny Bank AC Taipei	Taipei
5	Taipei Elite	Taipei
6	TCRFC	Taichung

== Hong Kong ==
- Football association: The Hong Kong Football Association
- Second-level league: Hong Kong First Division League

As of 2024–25 season:

	Club	Location
1	3 Sing	Hong Kong
2	Central & Western District R&SA	Central & Western District
3	Citizen AA	Diamond Hill
4	Eastern District SA	Wan Chai District
5	Hoi King SA	Hong Kong
6	Resources Capital FC	Hong Kong
7	Sham Shui Po SA	Sham Shui Po District
8	Shatin SA	Sha Tin District
9	South China AA	Hong Kong
10	Tai Po FC	Tai Po District
11	Tuen Mun SA	Tuen Mun
12	Wing Yee FT	Hong Kong
13	WSE	Kowloon

== India ==
- Football association: All India Football Federation
- Second-level league: I-League
Locations of current I-League clubs

As of 2024–25 season:

Team	Location
Aizawl	Aizawl
Churchill Brothers	Margao
Delhi	Delhi
Dempo	Panaji
Gokulam Kerala	Calicut
Inter Kashi	Varanasi
Namdhari	Bhaini Sahib
Rajasthan United	Jaipur
Real Kashmir	Srinagar
Shillong Lajong	Shillong
Sporting Bengaluru	Bengaluru
Sreenidi Deccan	Visakhapatnam

== Indonesia ==
- Football association: Football Association of Indonesia
- Second-level league: Championship

As of 2026–27 season:

Locations of teams in the 2026–27 Championship.
Red: West Group; Blue: East Group
Locations of teams in the 2026–27 Championship from Java region.
Red: West Group; Blue: East Group

Team	Location
Adhyaksa Bekasi	Bekasi
Barito Putera	Banjarmasin
de Red	Surabaya
Deltras	Sidoarjo
Kendal Tornado	Kendal
Persela	Lamongan
Persiba	Balikpapan
Persikad	Depok
Persiku	Kudus
Persipura	Jayapura
Persiraja	Banda Aceh
Persis	Surakarta
PSBS	Biak Numfor
PSGC	Ciamis
PSIS	Semarang
PSMS	Medan
PSPS	Pekanbaru
RANS Nusantara	Batu
Semen Padang	Padang
Sumsel United	Palembang

== Iran ==
- Football association: Football Federation Islamic Republic of Iran
- Second-level league: Azadegan League
Locations of clubs

As of 2024–25 season:

	Club	Location
1	Ario Eslamshahr	Eslamshahr
2	Be'sat Kermanshah	Kermanshah
3	Damash Gilan	Rasht
4	Fajr Sepasi	Shiraz
5	Mes Kerman	Kerman
6	Mes Shahr-e Babak	Shahr-e Babak
7	Mes Sungun	Tabriz
8	Naft va Gaz Gachsaran	Dogonbadan
9	Palayesh Naft	Bandar Abbas
10	Naft Masjed Soleyman	Masjed Soleyman
11	Nirooye Zamini	Tehran
12	Pars Jonoubi Jam	Jam
13	Paykan	Tehran
14	Saipa FC	Tehran
15	Sanat Naft Abadan	Abadan
16	Shahrdari Astara	Astara
17	Shahrdari Noshahr	Nowshahr
18	Shahr Raz Shiraz	Shiraz

== Iraq ==
- Football association: Iraq Football Association
- Second-level league: Iraqi Premier Division League

As of 2023–24 season:

	Club	Location
01	Afak FC	Al-Qadisiyyah
02	Al-Alam SC	Saladin
03	Al-Bahri SC	Basra
04	Al-Difaa Al-Madani	Baghdad
05	Al-Hudood SC	Baghdad
06	Al-Hussein SC (Baghdad)	Baghdad
07	Al-Jinsiya FC	Baghdad
08	Al-Kufa FC	Najaf
09	Al-Muroor SC	Baghdad
10	Al-Nasiriya FC	Dhi Qar
11	Al-Ramadi FC	Anbar
12	Al-Samawa FC	Samawa
13	Al-Sinaat Al-Kahrabaiya	Baghdad
14	Al-Shirqat FC	Saladin
15	Al-Sulaikh SC	Baghdad
16	Babil SC	Babil
17	Diyala FC	Diyala
18	Duhok SC	Duhok
19	Ghaz Al-Shamal	Kirkuk
20	Karbalaa FC	Karbala
21	Masafi Al-Janoob	Basra
22	Maysan FC	Maysan
23	Peshmerga FC	Sulaymaniyah
24	Suq Al-Shuyukh FC	Dhi Qar

== Japan ==
- Football association: Japan Football Association
- Second-level league: J2 League

As of 2024 season:

	Club	Location
01	Albirex Niigata	Niigata
02	Blaublitz Akita	Akita
03	Ehime FC	Ehime
04	Fagiano Okayama	Okayama
05	Giravanz Kitakyushu	Fukuoka
06	Iwate Grulla Morioka	Iwate
07	JEF United Chiba	Chiba
08	Machida Zelvia	Tokyo
09	Matsumoto Yamaga	Nagano
10	Mito Hollyhock	Ibaraki
11	Montedio Yamagata	Yamagata
12	Omiya Ardija	Saitama
13	Renofa Yamaguchi	Yamaguchi
14	Roasso Kumamoto	Kumamoto
15	FC Ryukyu	Okinawa
16	SC Sagamihara	Kanagawa
17	Tochigi SC	Tochigi
18	Thespakusatsu Gunma	Gunma
19	V-Varen Nagasaki	Nagasaki
20	Ventforet Kofu	Yamanashi
21	Tokyo Verdy	Tokyo
22	Zweigen Kanazawa	Ishikawa

== Jordan ==
- Football association: Jordan Football Association
- Second-level league: Jordanian First Division League

As of 2025 season:

Locations of the 2025 Jordanian First Division League teams

	Club	Location
1	Al-Arabi	Irbid, Irbid
2	Al-Hashemiya	Al-Hashimiya, Zarqa
3	Al-Sareeh	Al-Sareeh, Irbid
4	Al-Tura	Al-Turrah, Irbid
5	Al-Yarmouk	Amman, Amman
6	Amman FC	Amman, Amman
7	Doqarah	Duwaqarah, Irbid
8	Ittihad Al-Ramtha	Ar-Ramtha, Irbid
9	Jerash	Jerash, Jerash
10	Kufrsoum	Kufr Soum, Irbid
11	Ma'an	Ma'an, Ma'an
12	Moghayer Al-Sarhan	Badiah Gharbiyah, Mafraq
13	Samma	Samma, Irbid
14	Shabab Al-Aqaba	Aqaba, Aqaba

== Lebanon ==
- Football association: Lebanon Football Association
- Second-level league: Lebanese Second Division

As of 2024–25 season:

	Club	Location
1	Akhaa Ahli Aley	Aley
2	BFA Sporting	Beirut
3	Jwayya FC	Jwayya
4	Tripoli	Tripoli
5	Irshad Chehim	Shheem
6	Risaleh Toura	Toura
7	Ukhouwa Kharayeb	Kharayeb
8	Mabarra	Beirut
9	Nahda Barelias	Bar Elias
10	Salam Zgharta	Zgharta
11	Ahly Nabatieh	Nabatieh
12	Wehda Saadnayel	Saadnayel

== Malaysia ==
- Football association: Football Association of Malaysia
- Second-level league: Malaysia A1 Semi-Pro League
Locations of teams in the 2026–27 Malaysia A1 Semi-Pro
Klang Valley

As of 2026-27 season:

Team	Location	Stadium	Capacity
(Selangor) AAK-UNISEL	Kuala Selangor	Kuala Selangor Stadium	10,000
Armed Forces	Kampung Datuk Keramat	Mindef Stadium	5,000
(Negeri Sembilan) Bunga Raya	Bandar Sri Sendayan	IRC Arena Sendayan	500
(Putrajaya) Immigration II	Serdang	UPM Stadium	3,000
Johor Darul Ta'zim II	Larkin, Johor	Tan Sri Dato' Haji Hassan Yunos Stadium	30,000
Kedah FA	Alor Setar	Darul Aman Stadium	32,387
Kelantan City	Kota Bharu	Sultan Muhammad IV Stadium	30,000
Malaysian University-UiTM	Shah Alam	UiTM Stadium	10,000
(Perak) Manjung City	Seri Manjung	Manjung Municipal Council Stadium	15,000
Negeri Sembilan II	Tampin	Tampin Mini Stadium	3,000
Perak FA	Chemor	Chepor SSI Mini Stadium, Perak Football Complex	1,000
Selangor II	Shah Alam	UiTM Stadium	10,000
(Selangor) UM-Damansara United	Kuala Lumpur	UM Arena Stadium	1,500
(Penang) USM	George Town, Penang	USM Stadium	1,500

== Maldives ==
- Football association: Football Association of Maldives
- Second-level league: Maldivian Second Division Football Tournament

As of 2020 season:

	Club	Location
1	B.G. Sports Club	
2	Club PK	
3	Club Valencia	
4	Dhivehi Sifainge Club	
5	JJ Sports	
6	Kuda Henveiru	
7	Mahibadhoo	
8	Maldives U19	
9	Super United Sports	

== Mongolia ==
- Football association: Mongolian Football Federation
- Second-level league: Mongolian First League

As of 2020 season:

Club
BCH Lions
Khoromkhon FC
Khovd FC
Tuv Buganuud FC
DMU FC
Aldariin Daychid FC
Khovd Western FC
Deren-2
Khökh Chononuud FC
Khan-Uul FC

== Myanmar ==
- Football association: Myanmar Football Federation
- Second-level league: Myanmar National League 2

As of 2023 season:

	Club	Location
1	Glory Goal FC	
2	Golden Grit FC	
3	Junior Lions	Yangon
4	Mawyawadi FC	Lashio
5	Port	Dagon Seikkan
6	Rakhine United	Sittwe
7	Shwe Pyi Thar FC	
8	Silver Star	Yangon
9	Thitsar Arman FC	Yangon
10	University	

== Nepal ==
- Football association: All Nepal Football Association
- Second-level League: Martyr's Memorial B-Division League

As of 2022 season:

	Club	Location
1	Bansbari Club	Kathmandu
2	Birgunj United FC	Birgunj
3	Boys Union Club	Lalitpur
4	Church Boys United	Kathmandu
5	Jhamsikhel Youth Club	Lalitpur
6	Khumaltar Youth Club	Lalitpur
7	Madhyapur Youth Association	Bhaktapur
8	Nayabasti Youth Club	Kathmandu
9	Ranipokhari Corner Team	Kathmandu
10	Samajik Youth Club	Gokarneshwar
11	Saraswati Youth Club	Kathmandu
12	Shree Bhagwati Club	Kathmandu
13	Shree Kumari Club	Kathmandu
14	Tushal Youth Club	Lalitpur

== Pakistan ==
- Football association: Pakistan Football Federation
- Second-level league: PFF League

As of 2020 season:

	Club	Location
01	Aqua Pure Water FC	
02	Atletico Academy Lahore	
03	Baloch Quetta F.C.	
04	GPA F.C.	
05	Hazara Coal Company	
06	Insaf Afghan Goods Trading Company	
07	Jeay Laal	
08	Karachi United	
09	Lyallpur FC	
10	Masha United	
11	Pak Afghan Clearing FC	
12	Pakistan Police F.C.	
13	Pakistan Railways FC	
14	Pakistan Steel FC	
15	Sindh Government Press F.C.	
16	Social Welfare FT	
17	Wohaib FC	
18	Young Ittefaq	

== Saudi Arabia ==
- Football association: Saudi Arabia Football Federation
- Second-level league: Saudi First Division League
Locations of teams in the 2025–26 First Division League

As of 2025–26 season:

Team	Location
Abha	Abha
Al-Adalah	Al-Ahsa
Al-Anwar	Hotat Bani Tamim
Al-Arabi	Unaizah
Al-Batin	Hafar al-Batin
Al-Bukiryah	Al-Bukiryah
Al-Diriyah	Diriyah
Al-Faisaly	Harmah
Al-Jabalain	Hail
Al-Jandal	Dumat al-Jandal
Al-Jubail	Jubail
Al-Orobah	Sakakah
Al-Raed	Buraidah
Al-Tai	Hail
Al-Ula	al-Ula
Al-Wehda	Mecca
Al-Zulfi	Al-Zulfi
Jeddah	Jeddah

== South Korea ==
- Football association: Korea Football Association
- Second-level league: K League 2

As of 2024 season:

	Club	Location
1	Ansan Greeners	Ansan
2	FC Anyang	Anyang
3	Bucheon FC 1995	Bucheon
4	Busan IPark	Busan
5	Chungnam Asan FC	Asan
6	Daejeon Hana Citizen	Daejeon
7	Gimpo FC	Gimpo
8	Gwangju FC	Gwangju
9	Gyeongnam FC	Gyeongnam
10	Jeonnam Dragons	Jeonnam
11	Seoul E-Land	Seoul

== Tajikistan ==
- Football association: Tajikistan Football Federation
- Second-level league: Tajikistan First League

As of 2021 season:

	Club	Location
01	Barkchi	Hisor
02	Dynamo Dushanbe	Dushanbe
03	Hulbuk Vose	Hulbuk
04	Isfara	Isfara
05	Khayr Vahdat FK	Vahdat
06	Khosilot Farkhor	Farkhar
07	Mohir	Yovon
08	Pakthakor	Jabbor Rasulov
09	Panjshir	Kolkhozobod
10	Ravshan Zafarobod	Zafarobod
11	Regar-TadAZ Tursunzoda	Tursunzoda
12	Saroykamar Panj	Panj

== Thailand ==
- Football association: Football Association of Thailand
- Second-level league: Thai League 2

As of 2023–24 season:

	Club	Location
01	Ayutthaya United F.C.	Ayutthaya
02	Chainat Hornbill	Chainat
03	Chiangmai FC	Chiang Mai
04	Chiangmai United F.C.	Chiang Mai
05	Customs United F.C.	Samut Prakan
06	Kasetsart	Bangkok
07	Krabi F.C.	Krabi
08	Lampang FC	Lampang
09	Muangkan United F.C.	Kanchanaburi
10	Nakhon Pathom United F.C.	Nakhon Pathom
11	Phrae United	Phrae
12	Ranong United F.C.	Ranong
13	Rayong FC	Rayong
14	Samut Prakan City F.C.	Samut Prakan
15	Suphanburi F.C.	Suphanburi
16	Trat F.C.	Trat
17	Udon Thani FC	Udon Thani
18	Uthai Thani F.C.	Uthai Thani

== United Arab Emirates ==
- Football association: United Arab Emirates Football Association
- Second-level league: UAE Division One

As of 2023–24 season:

	Club	Location
01	Abtal Al Khaleej FC	Dubai
02	Al-Arabi	Umm al Quwain
03	Al Bataeh Club	Al Bataeh
04	Al Dhaid SC	Dhaid
05	Al Hamriyah SC	Al Hamriyah
06	Al Jazirah Al Hamra FC	Al Jazirah Al Hamra
07	Al Rams Club	Rams
08	Al Taawon	Al Jeer
09	Dibba Al-Fujairah Club	Dibba Al-Fujairah
10	Dibba Al-Hisn Sports Club	Dibba Al-Hisn
11	Dubai City F.C.	Dubai
12	Fujairah FC	Fujairah
13	Masafi Club	Masafi
14	Masfout Club	Masfout

== Uzbekistan ==
- Football association: Uzbekistan Football Federation
- Second-level league: Uzbekistan Pro League

As of 2024 season:

	Club	Location
1	Aral Nokis	Nukus
2	Bukhara	Bukhara
3	Dustlik Tashkent	Tashkent
4	FK Mash'al Mubarek	Muborak
5	Olimpik-Mobiuz	Tashkent
6	Kokand 1912	Kokand
7	FC Shurtan Guzar	Gʻuzor
8	Xorazm Urganch	Xorazm

== Vietnam ==
- Football association: Vietnam Football Federation
- Second-level league: V.League 2

As of 2024-25 season:

	Club	Location
1	Ba Ria-Vung Tau FC	Ba Ria-Vung Tau
2	Dong Nai FC	Dong Nai
3	Dong Thap FC	Dong Thap
4	Hoa Binh FC	Hoa Binh
5	Hue FC	Hue
6	Khatoco Khanh Hoa	Khanh Hoa
7	Long An FC	Long An
8	LPBank Ho Chi Minh City	Ho Chi Minh City
9	Phu Dong Ninh Binh	Ninh Binh
10	PVF-CAND	Hung Yen
11	Truong Tuoi Binh Phuoc	Binh Phuoc

== See also ==
- List of top-division football clubs in AFC countries
