= List of top-division football clubs in AFC countries =

AFC countries on this map of the world's six football confederations

The List of top-division football clubs in Asian Football Confederation (AFC) countries. The Asian Football Confederation (AFC) includes all countries within the Asian territory as members, except Armenia, Azerbaijan, Chagos Islands, Christmas Island, Cocos Islands, Cyprus, Egypt, Georgia, Israel, Kazakhstan, Russia and Turkey, as most of them are affiliated with another confederation, or none at all. The AFC also includes as members the Oceanian countries of Australia, Guam, and the Northern Mariana Islands.

Each of the AFC member countries has their own football league systems. The clubs playing in top-level league compete for the title as the country' champions, and also for places in next season's AFC club competitions: the AFC Champions League Elite, the AFC Champions League Two and the AFC Challenge League. Due to promotion and relegation, the clubs playing in the top-level league are usually different every season.

The champions of the previous season in each country are listed in bold.

Some clubs play in a national football league other than their own country's. In particular, the Australian A-League includes a team from New Zealand, whose national federation is a member of the Oceania Football Confederation.

- For clubs playing at lower divisions, see List of second division football clubs in AFC countries.
- For clubs belonging to any of the other five continental football confederations of the world, see List of association football clubs.

**Club name**	Club finished the previous season as league champions.

== League ranking ==
League rankings are calculated based on the points earned by clubs while playing in Asian club competitions and are used to determine the country's quota in Asian club competitions.

== Afghanistan ==
- Football association:
  - Afghanistan Football Federation
  - Pashto: فدراسيون فوتبال افغانستان
- Top-level league:
  - Afghanistan Champions League
  - Pashto: د افغانستان چمپینز لیګ
- 2026 AFC ranking: 40th
Locations of the teams

As of 2026 season:

	Club	Location
1	**Abu Muslim Farah FC**	Farah
2	Aino Mina FC	Kandahar
3	Arman FC	Kabul
4	Ettifaq Khanzadah Club	Kandahar
5	Istiqlal Kabul FC	Kabul
6	Jawanan Perozi	Kabul
7	Khurasan FC	Faryab
8	Sarrafan FC	Herat
9	Sarsabz Yashlar FC	Faryab
10	Sorkh Poshan	Herat

== Australia ==
- Football association: Football Australia
- Top-level league:
  - A-League Men
  - A-League Women
- 2026 AFC ranking: 9th

=== A-League Men ===
As of 2025–26 A-League Men season:

Location map of A-League soccer clubs (excluding Wellington Phoenix and Auckland FC)

	Club	Location
01	Adelaide United	Adelaide
02	(New Zealand) Auckland FC	Auckland
03	Brisbane Roar	Brisbane
04	Central Coast Mariners	Gosford
05	Macarthur FC	Sydney
06	**Melbourne City**	Melbourne
07	Melbourne Victory	Melbourne
08	Newcastle Jets	Newcastle
09	Perth Glory	Perth
10	Sydney FC	Sydney
11	(New Zealand) Wellington Phoenix	Wellington
12	Western Sydney Wanderers	Sydney

=== A-League Women ===
As of 2024–25 A-League Women season:

	Club	Location
1	Adelaide United	Adelaide
2	Brisbane Roar	Brisbane
3	Canberra United	Canberra
4	Central Coast Mariners	Gosford
5	Melbourne City	Melbourne
6	Melbourne Victory	Melbourne
7	Newcastle Jets	Newcastle
8	Perth Glory	Perth
9	**Sydney FC**	Sydney
10	(New Zealand) Wellington Phoenix	Wellington and Wollongong
11	Western Sydney Wanderers	Sydney
12	Western United	Sydney

== Bahrain ==
- Football association:
  - Bahrain Football Association
  - Arabic: الاتحاد البحريني لكرة القدم
    (Al-Ittiḥād Al-Baḥraynī Likurat Al-Qadam)
- Top-level league:
  - Bahraini Premier League
  - Arabic: الدوري البحريني الممتاز
    (Ad-Dawrī Al-Baḥraynī Al-Mumtāz)
- 2026 AFC ranking: 16th
Locations of the 2025–26 Premier League teams

As of 2025–26 season:

	Club	Location
01	A'Ali	A'ali
02	Al-Ahli	Manama
03	Al-Hala	Muharraq
04	Al-Hidd	Hidd
05	Al-Khaldiya SC	Hamad
06	**Al-Muharraq SC**	Muharraq
07	Al-Najma	Manama
08	Al-Riffa SC	Riffa
09	Al-Shabab	Manama
10	Bahrain SC	Muharraq
11	Budaiya	Budaiya
12	Malkiya	Malkiya
13	Sitra Club	Sitra

== Bangladesh ==
- Football association:
  - Bangladesh Football Federation
  - Bengali: বাংলাদেশ ফুটবল ফেডারেশন
    (Bānlādēśa Phuṭabala Phēḍārēśana)
- Top-level league:
  - Bangladesh Premier League
  - Bengali: বাংলাদেশ প্রিমিয়ার লিগ
    (Bānlādēśa Primiẏāra Liga)
- 2026 AFC ranking: 28th
Locations of the 2025–26 Bangladesh Premier League teams

As of 2025–26 season:

	Club	Location
01	Dhaka Abahani	Cumilla
02	Arambagh KS	Manikganj
03	Bangladesh Police FC	Mymensingh
04	Bashundhara Kings	Dhaka
05	Brothers Union	Munshiganj
06	Fakirerpool YMC	Gazipur
07	Fortis FC	Dhaka
08	**Mohammedan SC**	Cumilla
09	Rahmatganj MFS	Munshiganj
10	PWD Sports Club	Gazipur

== Bhutan ==
- Football association:
  - Bhutan Football Federation
  - Dzongkha: འབྲུག་ཡུལ་རྐང་རིལཁོངས་གཏོགས
- Top-level league: Bhutan Premier League
- 2026 AFC ranking: 35th

As of 2026 season:

Location football club of Bhutan Premier League

	Club	Location
1	BFF Academy	Thimphu
2	Drukpa FC	Thimphu
3	**Paro FC**	Paro
4	Phuntsholing Heroes	Phuntsholing
5	Royal Thimphu College	Thimphu
6	Tensung	Thimphu
7	Thimphu City	Thimphu
8	Transport United	Thimphu
9	Tsirang	Damphu
10	Ugyen Academy	Punakha

== Brunei Darussalam ==
- Football association:
  - Football Association of Brunei Darussalam
  - **Malay: ڤرساتون بولاسيڤك بروني دارالسلام**
    (Persatuan Bolasepak Brunei Darussalam)
- Top-level league:
  - Brunei Super League
  - **Malay: ليڬ سوڤر بروني**
    (Liga Super Brunei)
- 2026 AFC ranking: 41st

As of 2025–26 season:

Location of Brunei Super League clubs

	Club	Location
01	BSRC FC	Panaga
02	Hawa FC	Belait
03	**Indera SC**	Bandar Seri Begawan
04	Jerudong FC	Jerudong
05	Kasuka FC	Bandar Seri Begawan
06	Kuala Belait	Kuala Belait
07	Kota Ranger	Bandar Seri Begawan
08	Lun Bawang	Batu Apoi
09	MS ABDB	Bandar Seri Begawan
10	MS PPDB	Tungku
11	Rimba Star	Bandar Seri Begawan
12	Wijaya FC	Bandar Seri Begawan

== Cambodia ==
- Football association:
  - Football Federation of Cambodia
  - Khmer: សហព័ន្ធកីឡាបាល់ទាត់កម្ពុជា
    (Sâhăkpoăn Keilabăltoăt Kămpŭchéa)
- Top-level league:
  - Cambodian Premier League
  - Khmer: លីគកំពូលកម្ពុជា
    (Li K Kampoul Kămpŭchéa)
- 2026 AFC ranking: 22nd

As of 2025–26 season:

Locations of the 2025–26 Cambodian Premier League teams

	Club	Location
1	Angkor Tiger	Siem Reap
2	Boeung Ket	Phnom Penh
3	ISI Dangkor Senchey	Phnom Penh
4	Kirivong Sok Sen Chey	Takéo Province
5	Life Sihanoukville	Sihanoukville
6	MOI Kompong Dewa FA	Phnom Penh
7	Nagaworld	Kampong Speu Province
8	Phnom Penh Crown	Phnom Penh
9	**Preah Khan Reach Svay Rieng**	Svay Rieng Province
10	Tiffy Army	Phnom Penh
11	Visakha	Phnom Penh

== China, People's Republic of ==
- Football association:
  - Chinese Football Association
  - Chinese: 中国足球协会
    (Zhōngguó Zúqiú Xiéhuì)
- Top-level league:
  - Chinese Super League
  - Chinese: 中超联赛
    (Zhōngchāo Liánsài)
- 2026 AFC ranking: 8th

As of 2026 season:

Locations of the Chinese Super League teams

	Club	Location
01	Beijing Guoan	Beijing
02	Chengdu Rongcheng	Chengdu
03	Chongqing Tonglianglong	Chongqing
04	Dalian Yingbo	Dalian
05	Henan	Zhengzhou
06	Liaoning Tieren	Shenyang
07	Qingdao Hainiu	Qingdao
08	Qingdao West Coast	Qingdao
09	Shandong Taishan	Jinan
10	**Shanghai Port**	Shanghai
11	Shanghai Shenhua	Shanghai
12	Shenzhen Peng City	Shenzhen
13	Tianjin Jinmen Tiger	Tianjin
14	Wuhan Three Towns	Wuhan
15	Yunnan Yukun	Yuxi
16	Zhejiang	Hangzhou

== Taiwan ==
See Chinese Taipei for the naming issue.

- Football association:
  - Chinese Taipei Football Association
  - Chinese: 中華民國足球協會
    (Zhōnghuá Mínguó Zúqiú Xiéhuì)
- Top-level league:
  - Taiwan Football Premier League
  - Chinese: 台灣企業甲級足球聯賽
    (Táiwān Qǐyè Jiǎ Jí Zúqiú Liánsài)
- 2026 AFC ranking: 29th
Locations of the Taiwan Football Premier League teams

As of 2025–26 season:

	Club	Location
1	AC Taipei (AC台北)	Taipei
2	Hang Yuen (航源)	New Taipei
3	Ming Chuan University (銘傳大學)	Taoyuan
4	Taichung FUTURO (台中 FUTURO)	Taichung
5	Taichung Rock (台中磐石)	Taichung
6	**Tainan City** (台灣鋼鐵)	Tainan
7	Taipower FC (高市台電)	Kaohsiung
8	Tatung (大同)	Taipei

== Democratic People Republic of Korea ==
- Football association:
  - DPR Korea Football Association
  - Korean: 조선민주주의인민공화국 축구 협회
    (Joseon Minjujuui Inmin Gonghwaguk Chukgu Hyeophoe)
- Top-level league:
  - DPR Korea Premier Football League
  - Korean: 조선민주주의인민공화국 1부류축구련맹전
    (Joseon Minjujuui Inmin Gonghwaguk Hana Bulyuchug Gulyeon Maengjeon)
- 2026 AFC ranking: 33rd

As of 2025–26 season:

Location football club of DPR Korea Premier Football League

	Club	Location
01	Amrokkang SC	Pyongyang
02	**April 25 SC**	Pyongyang
03	Hwaebul SC	Pochon
04	Jebi SC	Pyongyang
05	Kigwancha SC	Pyongyang
06	Kyonggongopsong SC	Pyongyang
07	Pyongyang SC	Pyongyang
08	Rimyongsu SC	Sariwon
09	Ryomyong SC	Pyongyang
10	Sobaeksu SC	Pyongyang
11	Sonbong SC	Rason
12	Wolmido SC	Kimchaek

== Guam ==
- Football association: Guam Football Association
- Top-level league: Guam Soccer League
- 2026 AFC ranking: 46th
Location football club of Guam Soccer League

As of 2026 season:

	Club	Location
1	Bank of Guam Strykers	Dededo
2	Quality Distributors	Hagatna
3	**Rovers FC**	Hagatna
4	Sidekick SC	Dededo
5	Southern Heat Omega	
6	Southern Cobras SC	
7	Wings FC	Dededo

== Hong Kong ==
- Football association:
  - The Football Association of Hong Kong, China
  - Chinese: 中國香港足球總會
    (Jūng Gwok Hēung Góng Jūk Kàuh Júng Wúih)
- Top-level league:
  - Hong Kong Premier League (men)
    - Chinese: 香港超級聯賽
      (Hēung Góng Chīu Kāp Lyùhn Choi)
  - Hong Kong Women's League (1st Division) (women)
    - Chinese: 香港女子聯賽 (甲組)
      (Hēung Góng Néuih Jí Lyùhn Choi (Gaap Jóu))
- 2026 AFC ranking: 20th

=== Hong Kong Premier League ===
As of 2025–26 season:

Locations of the 2025–26 Hong Kong Premier League teams.

	Club	Location
1	Eastern	Mong Kok
2	Eastern District	Siu Sai Wan
3	HKFC	Happy Valley
4	Hong Kong Rangers	Tsing Yi
5	Kitchee	Mong Kok
6	Kowloon City	Sham Shui Po
7	Lee Man	Tseung Kwan O
8	North District	Sheung Shui
9	Southern District	Wong Chuk Hang
10	**Tai Po**	Tai Po

=== Hong Kong Women's League (1st Division) ===
As of 2024–25 season:

	Club
1	HKFC
2	**Kitchee**
3	Shatin
4	TSL FC
5	Tuen Mun
6	United Citizen
7	WSE

== India ==
- Football Association:
  - All India Football Federation
- Top-level league:
  - Indian Super League
  - Indian Women's League (women)
- 2026 AFC ranking: 24th

=== Indian Super League ===
As of 2025–26 Indian Super League season :

Indian Super League clubs

	Club	Location
01	**Mohun Bagan SG**	Kolkata
02	Bengaluru FC	Bangalore
03	Chennaiyin FC	Chennai
04	SC Delhi	New Delhi
05	East Bengal	Kolkata
06	FC Goa	Margao
07	Inter Kashi	Varanasi
08	Jamshedpur FC	Jamshedpur
09	Kerala Blasters	Kochi
10	Mohammedan SC	Kolkata
11	Mumbai City	Mumbai
12	NorthEast United	Guwahati
13	Odisha FC	Bhubaneswar
14	Punjab FC	Mohali

=== Indian Women's League ===
As of 2023-24 Indian Women's League season:

Locations of the Indian Women's League teams

	Club	Location
01	East Bengal	Kolkata
02	Gokulam Kerala	Kozhikode
03	HOPS	New Delhi
04	Kickstart	Bengaluru
05	Nita	Cuttack
06	**Odisha**	Bhubaneswar
07	Sethu	Madurai
08	Sreebhumi	Kolkata

== Indonesia ==
- Football association:
  - Football Association of Indonesia
  - Indonesian: Persatuan Sepakbola Seluruh Indonesia
- Top-level league:
  - Super League (men)
    - Indonesian: Liga Super
  - Liga 1 Putri (women)
    - Indonesian: Liga Satu Putri
- 2026 AFC ranking: 18th
Location football club of Super League
Location football club of Super League in Java Island

=== Super League ===
As of 2025−26 season:

	Club	Location
01	Arema	Malang
02	Bali United	Gianyar
03	Bhayangkara Presisi Lampung	Bandar Lampung
04	Borneo Samarinda	Samarinda
05	Dewa United Banten	Serang
06	Madura United	Pamekasan
07	Malut United	Ternate
08	Persebaya	Surabaya
09	**Persib**	Bandung
10	Persija	Jakarta
11	Persijap	Jepara
12	Persik	Kediri
13	Persis	Surakarta
14	Persita	Tangerang
15	PSBS	Biak Numfor
16	PSIM	Yogyakarta
17	PSM	Makassar
18	Semen Padang	Padang

== Iraq ==
- Football association:
  - Iraq Football Association
  - Arabic: الاتحاد العراقي لكرة القدم
    (Al-Ittiḥād Al-ʿIrāqī Likurat Al-Qadam)
- Top-level league:
  - Iraq Stars League
  - Arabic: دوري نجوم العراق
    (Dawrī Nujūm Al-ʿIrāq)
- 2026 AFC ranking: 12th

As of 2025–26 season:

Locations of the 2025–26 Iraq Stars League teams

	Club	Location
1	Al-Gharraf	Dhi Qar
2	Al-Kahrabaa	Baghdad
3	Al-Karkh	Baghdad
4	Al-Karma	Anbar
5	Al-Minaa	Basra
6	Al-Mosul	Mosul
7	Al-Naft	Baghdad
8	Al-Najaf	Najaf
9	Al-Qasim	Babil
10	Al-Quwa Al-Jawiya	Baghdad
11	**Al-Shorta**	Baghdad
12	Al-Talaba	Baghdad
13	Al-Zawraa	Baghdad
14	Amanat Baghdad	Baghdad
15	Diyala	Diyala
16	Duhok	Duhok
17	Erbil	Erbil
18	Naft Maysan	Amarah
19	Newroz	Sulaymaniyah
20	Zakho	Zakho

== Iran ==
- Football association:
  - Football Federation Islamic Republic of Iran
  - Persian: فدراسیون فوتبال جمهوری اسلامی ایران
    (Federasiun-e Futbal-e Jimhuri-ye Islâmi-ye Iran)
- Top-level league:
  - Persian Gulf Pro League
  - Persian: لیگ برتر خلیج فارس
    (Lig-e Bartar-e Khalij-e Fārs)
- 2026 AFC ranking: 5th

As of 2025–26 season:

Locations of the 2025–26 Persian Gulf Pro League teams

	Club	Location
1	Aluminium Arak	Arak
2	Chadormalou	Yazd
3	Esteghlal FC	Tehran
4	Fajr Sepasi Shiraz	Shiraz
5	Foolad FC	Ahvaz
6	Gol Gohar Sirjan	Sirjan
7	Kheybar	Khorramabad
8	Malavan FC	Bandar-e Anzali
9	Mes Kerman	Kerman
10	Mes Rafsanjan	Rafsanjan
11	Naft Masjed Soleyman	Masjed Soleyman
12	Paykan	Tehran
13	Persepolis FC	Tehran
14	Sepahan SC	Isfahan
15	**Tractor SC**	Tabriz
16	Zob Ahan Esfahan	Fooladshahr

== Japan ==
- Football association:
  - Japan Football Association
  - Japanese: 日本サッカー協会
    (Nihon Sakkā Kyōkai)
- Top-level league:
  - J1 League (men)
    - Japanese: J1リーグ
      (Jē Wan Rīgu)
  - WE League (women)
    - Japanese: WEリーグ
      (WE Rīgu)
- 2026 AFC ranking: 2nd

=== J1 League ===
As of 2026–27 season:

Locations of the 2026–27 J1 League teams

	Club	Location
1	Avispa Fukuoka	Fukuoka
2	Cerezo Osaka	Osaka
3	Fagiano Okayama	Okayama
4	FC Tokyo	Tokyo
5	Gamba Osaka	Osaka
6	JEF United Chiba	Chiba
7	**Kashima Antlers**	Ibaraki
8	Kashiwa Reysol	Chiba
9	Kawasaki Frontale	Kanagawa
10	Kyoto Sanga	Kyoto
11	Machida Zelvia	Tokyo
12	Mito HollyHock	Mito
13	Nagoya Grampus	Aichi
14	Sanfrecce Hiroshima	Hiroshima
15	Shimizu S-Pulse	Shizuoka
16	Tokyo Verdy	Tokyo
17	Urawa Red Diamonds	Saitama
18	V-Varen Nagasaki	Nagasaki
19	Vissel Kobe	Hyogo
20	Yokohama F. Marinos	Kanagawa

=== WE League ===
As of 2023–24 season:

Locations of the 2021–22 WE League teams

	Club	Location
1	AC Nagano Parceiro Ladies	Nagano
2	Albirex Niigata Ladies	Niigata
3	Cerezo Osaka Yanmar	Osaka
4	Chifure AS Elfen Saitama	Saitama
5	INAC Kobe Leonessa	Hyogo
6	JEF United Chiba Ladies	Chiba
7	Mynavi Sendai Ladies	Miyagi
8	Nippon TV Tokyo Verdy Beleza	Tokyo
9	Nojima Stella Kanagawa Sagamihara	Kanagawa
10	Omiya Ardija Ventus	Saitama
11	Sanfrecce Hiroshima Regina	Hiroshima
12	**Urawa Red Diamonds Ladies**	Saitama

== Jordan ==
- Football association:
  - Jordan Football Association
  - Arabic: الاتحاد الأردني لكرة القدم
    (Al-Ittiḥād Al-Urdunī Likurat Al-Qadam)
- Top-level league:
  - Jordanian Pro League
  - Arabic: الدوري الأردني للمحترفين
    (Ad-Dawrī Al-Urdunī Limuḥtarifīn)
- 2026 AFC ranking: 13th

As of 2025–26 season:

Location of clubs in Jordan for the 2025-26 Pro League season

	Club	Location
1	Al-Ahli	Amman
2	Al-Baqa'a	Ain Al-Basha
3	Al-Faisaly	Amman
4	**Al-Hussein**	Irbid
5	Al-Jazeera	Amman
6	Al-Ramtha	Ar Ramtha
7	Al-Salt	Al Salt
8	Al-Sarhan	Badiah Gharbiyah
9	Al-Wehdat	Amman
10	Shabab Al-Ordon	Amman

== Korea Republic ==
- Football association:
  - Korea Football Association
  - Korean: 대한축구협회
    (Daehan Chukgu Hyeophoe)
- Top-level league:
  - K League 1
  - Korean: K리그1
    (K Ligeu Hana)
- 2026 AFC ranking: 3rd

As of 2026 season:

Locations of the 2026 K League 1 teams

	Club	Location
1	FC Anyang	Anyang
2	Bucheon FC 1995	Bucheon
3	Daejeon Hana Citizen	Daejeon
4	Gangwon FC	Gangwon
5	Gimcheon Sangmu	Gimcheon
6	Gwangju FC	Gwangju
7	Incheon United	Incheon
8	Jeju SK	Jeju
9	**Jeonbuk Hyundai Motors**	Jeonbuk
10	Pohang Steelers	Pohang
11	FC Seoul	Seoul
12	Ulsan HD	Ulsan

== Kuwait ==
- Football association:
  - Kuwait Football Association
  - Arabic: الإتحاد الكويتي لكرة القدم
    (Al-Ittiḥād Al-Kuwaytī Likurat Al-Qadam)
- Top-level league:
  - Kuwait Premier League
  - Arabic: الدوري الكويتي
    (Ad-Dawrī Al-Kuwaytī)
- 2026 AFC ranking: 21st

As of 2025–26 season:

Location football club of Kuwaiti Premier League

	Club	Location
1	Al-Arabi SC	Kuwait City
2	Al-Fahaheel SC	Kuwait City
3	Al-Jahra SC	Jahra
4	Al-Nasr	Al Farwaniyah
5	Al-Salmiya SC	Salmiya
6	Al-Shabab SC	Kuwait City
7	Al-Tadhamon SC	Al Farwaniyah
8	Kazma SC	Kuwait City
9	**Kuwait SC**	Kuwait City
10	Qadsia SC	Kuwait City

== Kyrgyz Republic ==
- Football association:
  - Kyrgyz Football Union
  - Kyrgyz: Кыргыз Футбол Бирлиги
    (Qyrğyz Futbol Birligy)
- Top-level league:
  - Kyrgyz Premier League
  - Kyrgyz: Кыргыз Премьер Лигасы
    (Qyrğyz Premjer Ligasy)
- 2026 AFC ranking: 26th

As of 2026 season:

Locations of teams in the 2025 Kyrgyz Premier League

	Club	Location
1	Abdysh-Ata Kant	Kant
2	FC Alay	Osh
3	Alga Bishkek	Bishkek
4	Asia Talas	Talas
5	Asiagoal Bishkek	Bishkek
6	**Bars Issyk-Kul**	Karakol
7	Bishkek City	Bishkek
8	Dordoi Bishkek	Bishkek
9	Ilbirs Bishkek	Bishkek
10	Kyrgyzaltyn	Kara-Balta
11	Muras United	Jalal-Abad
12	Neftchi Kochkor-Ata	Kochkor-Ata
13	OshSU Aldier	Osh
14	Talant	Kant
15	Toktogul	Toktogul
16	Uzgen	Özgön

== Laos ==
- Football association:
  - Lao Football Federation
  - Lao: ສະຫະພັນ ບານເຕະ ແຫ່ງຊາດ ລາວ
    (Sahaphan Bante Aehngsad Lav)
- Top-level league:
  - Lao Premier League
  - Lao: ລາວ ພຣີເມຍລີກ
    (Lav Phri Mia Lik)
- 2026 AFC ranking: 37th

As of 2025–26 season:

Locations of the 2022 Lao Premier League teams

	Club	Location
1	BIS Master	Vientiane
2	Champasak Avenir	Champasak
3	**Ezra FC**	Vientiane
4	Lao Army	Luang Prabang
5	Luang Prabang	Bishkek
6	Mazda GB	Vientiane
7	Namtha United	Luang Namtha
8	Salavan United	Salavan Province
9	Savannakhet	Savannakhet Province
10	Young Elephants FC	Vientiane

== Lebanon ==
- Football association:
  - Lebanese Football Association
  - Arabic: الاتحاد اللبناني لكرة القدم
    (Al-Ittiḥād Al-Lubnānī Likurat Al-Qadam)
- Top-level league:
  - Lebanese Premier League
  - Arabic: الدوري اللبناني الممتاز
    (Ad-Dawrī Al-Lubnānī Al-Mumtāz)
- 2026 AFC ranking: 25th

As of 2025–26 season:

Locations of the 2025–26 Lebanese Premier League teams

	Club	Location
1	Ahed	Beirut (Ouzai)
2	**Ansar**	Beirut (Tariq El Jdideh)
3	Bourj	Beirut (Bourj el-Barajneh)
4	Jwaya	Jwaya
5	Mabarra	Beirut (Tariq el-Matar)
6	Nejmeh	Beirut (Ras Beirut)
7	Racing Beirut	Beirut (Achrafieh)
8	Riyadi Abbasiyah	Aabbassiyeh
9	Safa	Beirut (Wata El-Museitbeh)
10	Sagesse	Beirut (Achrafieh)
11	Shabab Sahel	Beirut (Haret Hreik)
12	Tadamon Sour	Tyre

== Macau ==
- Football association:
  - Macau Football Association
  - Chinese: 澳門足球協會
    (Àomén Zúqiú Xiéhuì)
- Top-level league:
  - Liga de Elite
  - Chinese: 精英聯賽
    (Jīngyīng Liánsài)
- 2026 AFC ranking: 38th

As of 2026 season:

Location football club of Liga de Elite

	Club	Location
1	**Benfica Macau (澳門賓菲加體育會)**	Taipa
2	Cheng Fung (青鋒)	Nossa Senhora de Fátima
3	Gala (嘉華)	Nossa Senhora de Fátima
4	Gorilla of the Universe (新科宇宙之猩)	Nossa Senhora de Fátima
5	Hang Sai (澳門恆勢體育會)	Nossa Senhora de Fátima
6	Macau Chiba (千葉)	Nossa Senhora de Fátima
7	MUST IPO Elite (鄒北記)	Nossa Senhora de Fátima
8	GD Artilheiros (炮兵)	Taipa
9	Shao Jiang (將體育會)	Nossa Senhora de Fátima
10	[[University of Macau#Football club|]] (澳門大學)	Taipa

== Malaysia ==
- Football association:
  - Football Association of Malaysia
  - **Malay: ڤرساتون بولا سيڤك مليسيا**
    (Persatuan Bola Sepak Malaysia)
- Top-level league:
  - Malaysia Super League
  - **Malay: ليڬا سوڤر مليسيا**
    (Liga Super Malaysia)
- 2026 AFC ranking: 11th

As of 2025–26 season:

Locations of teams in the 2025–26 Malaysia Super League

	Club	Location
1	DPMM	Bandar Seri Begawan
2	Immigration	Kangar
3	**Johor Darul Ta'zim**	Iskandar Puteri
4	Kelantan The Real Warriors	Kota Bharu
5	Kuala Lumpur City	Kuala Lumpur
6	Kuching City	Kuching
7	Melaka	Krubong
8	Negeri Sembilan	Seremban
9	PDRM	Selayang
10	Penang FC	George Town
11	Sabah FC	Kota Kinabalu
12	Selangor FC	Selayang
13	Terengganu	Kuala Terengganu

== Maldives ==
- Football association: Football Association of Maldives
- Top-level league: Dhivehi Premier League
- 2026 AFC ranking: 34th

As of 2025–26 season:

	Club	Location
1	Buru Sports Club	Machchangolhi
2	Club Eagles	Maafannu
3	Club Green Streets	Machchangolhi
4	Club Valencia	Machchangolhi
5	**Maziya S&RC**	Maafannu
6	New Radiant	Henveiru
7	Odi Sports Club	Galolhu
8	TC Sports Club	Henveiru
9	United Victory	Galolhu
10	Victory Sports Club	Galolhu

== Mongolia ==
- Football association:
  - Mongolian Football Federation
  - Mongolian: Монголын Хөлбөмбөгийн Холбоо
    (Mongolyn Khölbömbögiin Kholboo)
- Top-level league:
  - Mongolian Premier League
  - Mongolian: Монголын Үндэсний Премьер Лиг
    (Mongolyn Undesnii Deed Lig)
- 2026 AFC ranking: 32nd

As of 2025–26 season:

Location of teams in 2024 Mongolian Premier League

	Club	Location
1	Central Stallions	Töv Province
2	Deren FC	Deren
3	FC Ulaanbaatar	Ulaanbaatar
4	Hunters	Ulaanbaatar
5	Khangarid FC	Erdenet
6	Khoromkhon	Ulaanbaatar
7	Khovd FC	Khovd
8	Khovd Western	Khovd
9	**SP Falcons**	Ulaanbaatar
10	Ulaangom City	Ulaangom

== Myanmar ==
- Football association:
  - Myanmar Football Federation
  - Burmese: မြန်မာနိုင်ငံ ဘောလုံး အဖွဲ့ချုပ်
- Top-level league:
  - Myanmar National League
  - Burmese: မြန်မာ နေရှင်နယ် လိဂ်
- 2026 AFC ranking: 30th

As of 2025–26 season:

Locations of the 2025–26 Myanmar National League

	Club	Location
1	Ayeyawady United	Pathein
2	Dagon Port	Dagon Seikkan
3	Dagon Stars	Dagon Township
4	Hanthawaddy United	Bago
5	ISPE FC	Mandalay
6	Rakhine United	Sittwe
7	Sagaing United	Monywa
8	**Shan United**	Taunggyi
9	Thitsar Arman	Yangon
10	Yadanarbon FC	Mandalay
11	Yangon United	Yangon
12	Yarmanya United	Mawlamyine

== Nepal ==
- Football association:
  - All Nepal Football Association
  - Nepali: अखिल नेपाल फुटबल संघ
- Top-level league:
  - Nepal Super League
    - Nepali: नेपाल सुपर लीग
  - Martyr's Memorial A-Division League
    - Nepali: शहीद स्मारक ए- डिभिजन लिग
- 2026 AFC ranking: 39th

=== Martyr's Memorial A-Division League ===
As of 2023 season:

Location football club of Martyr's Memorial A-Division League

	Club	Location
1	**Church Boys United**	Kathmandu
2	FC Khumaltar	Lalitpur
3	Friends Club	Lalitpur
4	Himalayan Sherpa	Kathmandu
5	Jawalakhel YC	Lalitpur
6	Machhindra FC	Kathmandu
7	Manang Marshyangdi	Pokhara
8	Nepal APF Club	Kathmandu
9	Nepal Army Club	Kathmandu
10	Nepal Police Club	Kathmandu
11	New Road Team	Kathmandu
12	Sankata Boys	Kathmandu
13	Satdobato Youth	Lalitpur
14	Three Star Club	Lalitpur

=== Nepal Super League ===
As of 2025 season:

Location football club of Nepal Super League

	Club	Location
1	Butwal Lumbini	Butwal
2	FC Chitwan	Bharatpur
3	Dhangadhi FC	Dhangadi
4	Jhapa FC	Jhapa
5	Kathmandu Razyrs	Kathmandu
6	**Lalitpur City**	Lalitpur
7	Pokhara Thunders	Pokhara

=== ANFA Women's League ===
As of 2024 season:

-->
Location football club of ANFA Women's League

	Club	Location
1	APF F.C.	Kathmandu
2	Bagmati Youth Club	Sarlahi
3	Chandrapur Municipality	Chandrapur
4	Karnali Province	Surkhet
5	Koshi Province	Biratnagar
6	Nepal Army F.C.	Kathmandu
7	**Nepal Police F.C.**	Kathmandu
8	Sankata F.C.	Pokhara
9	Sudurpashchim Province	Dhangadi
10	Waling Municipality	Waling

== Northern Mariana Islands ==
- Football association: Northern Mariana Islands Football Association
- Top-level league: Marianas Soccer League 1
- 2026 AFC ranking: 47th

As of 2025 season:

Location of clubs that competed in the 2025 season

	Club	Location
1	**Kanoa**	Saipan
2	Matansa	Saipan
3	MP United	Saipan
4	Men's Development Team 1	Saipan
5	Men's Development Team 2	Saipan

== Oman ==
- Football association:
  - Oman Football Association
  - Arabic: الاتحاد العُماني لكرة القدم
    (Al-Ittiḥād Al-ʿUmānī Likurat Al-Qadam)
- Top-level league:
  - Oman Professional League
  - Arabic: دوري المحترفين عمان
    (Dawrī Al-Muḥtarifīn ʿUmān)
- 2026 AFC ranking: 17th

As of 2025–26 season:

Locations of teams in the 2025–26 Oman Professional League

	Club	Location
1	Al-Khaburah	Al-Khaburah
2	Al-Nahda	Al-Buraimi
3	Al-Nasr SC	Salalah
4	Al-Rustaq Club	Rustaq
5	**Al-Seeb Club**	Seeb
6	Al-Shabab	Barka
7	Bahla Club	Bahla
8	Dhofar Club	Salalah
9	Ibri	Ibri
10	Oman Club	Muscat
11	Saham Club	Saham
13	Samail Club	Samail
12	Sohar SC	Sohar
13	Sur	Sur

== Pakistan ==
- Football association:
  - Pakistan Football Federation
  - Urdu: پاکستان فٹ بال فیڈریشن
- Top-level league:
  - Pakistan Premier League
  - Urdu: پاکستان پریمیئر لیگ
- 2026 AFC ranking: 45th

As of 2018–19 season:

Location of teams in Pakistan Premier League

	Club	Location
01	Civil Aviation Authority	Karachi
02	Huma FC	Islamabad
03	Karachi United	Karachi
04	**Khan Research Laboratories**	Rawalpindi
05	Lyallpur FC	Faisalabad
06	Muslim FC	Chaman
07	PAF FC	Islamabad
08	Pakistan Army	Rawalpindi
09	Pakistan Navy	Islamabad
10	SNGPL FC	Lahore
11	SSGC FC	Karachi
12	WAPDA FC	Lahore

== Palestine ==
- Football association:
  - Palestinian Football Association
  - Arabic: الاتحاد الفلسطيني لكرة القدم
    (Al-Ittiḥād Al-Filasṭīnī Likurat Al-Qadam)
- Top-level league:
  - Gaza Strip Premier League
    - Arabic: الدوري الممتاز الفلسطيني لقطاع غزة
      (Ad-Dawrī Al-Mumtāz Al-Filasṭīnī Al-Qiṭāʿu Ġazzah)
  - West Bank Premier League
    - Arabic: الدوري الممتاز الفلسطيني للضفة الغربية
      (Ad-Dawrī Al-Mumtāz Al-Filasṭīnī Aḍ-Ḍiffah Al-Ġarbiyyah)
- 2026 AFC ranking: 36th

=== Gaza Strip Premier League ===
Location football club of Gaza Premier League

	Club	Location
1	Al-Ahli Gaza	Beit Hanoun
2	Al-Hilal Gaza	Gaza City
3	Al-Ittihad Khan Yunis	Khan Yunis
4	Al-Ittihad Shuja'iyya	Shuja'iyya
5	Al-Sadaqah	Gaza City
6	Beit Hanoun	Beit Hanoun
7	Gaza Sports Club	Gaza City
8	Khidmat Al-Shatia	Gaza City
9	**Khidmat Rafah**	Rafah
10	Shabab Jabalia	Jabalia
11	Shabab Khan Yunis	Khan Yunis
12	Shabab Rafah	Rafah

=== West Bank Premier League ===
As of 2023–24 season

Location football club of Gaza Premier League

	Club	Location
1	Ahli Al-Khaleel	Hebron
2	Al-Sawahra Al-Maqdisi	Al-Ram
3	Hilal Al-Quds Club	Al-Ram
4	Jabal Al-Mukaber Club	Al-Ram
5	Markaz Balata	Nablus
6	Shabab Al-Bireh Institute	Al-Bireh
7	**Shabab Al-Dhahiriya**	Ad-Dhahiriya
8	Shabab Al-Khalil	Hebron
9	Shabab Al-Obaidya	Al-Khader
10	Shabab Alsamu	Hebron
11	Taraji Wadi Al-Nes	Bethlehem
12	Thaqafi Tulkarem	Tulkarm

== Philippines ==
- Football association:
  - Philippine Football Federation
  - Filipino: Pederasyon Futbol ng Pilipinas)
- Top-level league:
  - Philippines Football League (men)
    - Filipino: Liga Futbol ng Pilipinas
  - PFF Women's League (women)
    - Filipino: Liga Mga Babae PFF
- 2026 AFC ranking: 27th

=== Philippines Football League ===
As of the 2025–26 season:

Locations of the Philippines Football League teams.

Team	Location (Note: General location where the club is based in. Only select clubs have their own/designated home stadium.)
Aguilas–UMak	Makati, Metro Manila
Don Bosco Garelli United	Makati, Metro Manila
Dynamic Herb Cebu	Talisay, Cebu
**Kaya–Iloilo**	Pavia, Iloilo
Maharlika Taguig	Taguig, Metro Manila
Manila Digger	Taguig, Metro Manila
One Taguig	Taguig, Metro Manila
Philippine Army	Taguig, Metro Manila
Stallion Laguna	Biñan, Laguna
Tuloy	Muntinlupa, Metro Manila
Valenzuela PB–Mendiola	Valenzuela, Metro Manila

=== PFF Women's League ===
As of the 2023 season:

	Club	Location
1	Azzurri	Makati
2	DLSU Lady Booters	Manila
3	FEU Lady Tamaraw Booters	Manila
4	**Kaya F.C.–Iloilo**	Pavia
5	Manila Digger	Manila
6	Manila Nomads	Manila
7	Stallion Laguna	Biñan
8	Tuloy FC	Alabang
9	University of the Philippines	Quezon City
10	UST Lady Booters	Manila

== Qatar ==
- Football association:
  - Qatar Football Association
  - Arabic: الاتحاد القطري لكرة القدم
    (Al-Ittiḥād Al-Qaṭrī Likurat Al-Qadam)
- Top-level league:
  - Qatar Stars League
  - Arabic: دوري نجوم قطر
    (Dawrī Nujūm Qaṭr)
- 2026 AFC ranking: 6th

As of 2025–26 season:

Locations of the 2025–26 Qatar Stars League teams

	Club	Location
1	Al-Ahli	Doha
2	Al-Arabi	Doha
3	Al-Duhail	Doha
4	Al-Gharafa	Doha
5	Al-Rayyan	Al Rayyan
6	**Al-Sadd**	Doha
7	Al-Sailiya	Doha
8	Al-Shahaniya	Doha
9	Al-Shamal	Al Shamal
10	Al-Wakrah SC	Al Wakrah
11	Qatar SC	Doha
12	Umm Salal SC	Doha

== Saudi Arabia ==
- Football association:
  - Saudi Arabian Football Federation
  - Arabic: الاتحاد السعودي لكرة القدم
    (Al-ātḥād al-sʿūdī lkrẗ al-qdm)
- Top-level league:
  - Saudi Professional League
  - Arabic: الدوري السعودي للمحترفين
    (Al-dūrī al-sʿūdī llmḥtrfīn)
- 2026 AFC ranking: 1st

As of 2025–26 season:

Locations of teams in the 2025–26 Saudi Pro League

	Club	Location
1	Al-Ahli	Jeddah
2	Al-Ettifaq	Dammam
3	Al-Fateh	Hofuf
4	Al-Fayha	Al Majma'ah
5	Al-Hazem	Ar Rass
6	Al-Hilal	Riyadh
7	**Al-Ittihad**	Jeddah
8	Al-Khaleej	Saihat
9	Al-Kholood	Ar Rass
10	Al-Najma	Unaizah
11	Al-Nassr	Riyadh
12	Al-Okhdood	Najran
13	Al Qadsiah	Dammam
14	Al-Riyadh	Riyadh
15	Al-Shabab	Riyadh
16	Al-Taawoun	Buraidah
17	Damac FC	Khamis Mushait
18	Neom	Tabuk

== Singapore ==
- Football association: Football Association of Singapore
- Top-level league:
  - Singapore Premier League (men)
  - Women's Premier League (women)
- 2026 AFC ranking: 14th

=== Singapore Premier League ===
As of 2025–26 season:

Location football club of Singapore Premier League

	Club	Location
1	Albirex Niigata Singapore	Jurong East
2	Balestier Khalsa	Bishan
3	Geylang International	Tampines
4	Hougang United	Hougang
5	**Lion City Sailors**	Kallang
6	Tampines Rovers	Tampines
7	Tanjong Pagar United	Jurong East
8	Young Lions	Kallang

=== Deloitte Women's Premier League ===
As of the 2024 season:

Locations of the DW Premier League teams.

	Club	Location
1	Albirex Niigata Singapore	Jurong East
2	Balestier Khalsa	Bishan
3	Hougang United	Hougang
4	Geylang International	Tampines
5	**Lion City Sailors**	Kallang
6	Still Aerion	Singapore
7	Tampines Rovers	Tampines
06	Tanjong Pagar United	Jurong East
07	Tiong Bahru	Bukit Merah

== Sri Lanka ==
- Football association:
  - Football Sri Lanka
  - Sinhala: පාපන්දු ශ්රී ලංකාව
    (Pāpandu Srī Laṁkāva)
- Top-level league:
  - Sri Lanka Super League
  - Sinhala: ශ්රී ලංකා චැම්පියන්ස් ලීගය
    (Srī Laṁkā Cæmpiyans Līgaya)
- 2026 AFC ranking: 42nd

As of 2021 season:

Location football club of Sri Lanka Champions League

	Club	Location
01	Blue Eagles	Colombo
02	**Blue Star**	Kalutara
03	Colombo FC	Colombo
04	Defenders FC	Homagama
05	Navy Sea Hawks	Welisara
06	New Young's SC	Wennappuwa
07	Ratnam SC	Colombo
08	Red Star SC	Ratmalana
09	Renown SC	Colombo
10	Up Country Lions	Nawalapitiya

== Syria ==
- Football association:
  - Syrian Football Federation
  - Arabic: الاتحاد العربي السوريا لكرة القدم
    (Al-Ittiḥād Al-ʿArabi As-Sūriyā Likurat Al-Qadam)
- Top-level league:
  - Syrian Premier League
  - Arabic: الدوري السوريا الممتاز
    (Ad-Dawrī As-Sūriyā Al-Mumtāz)
- 2026 AFC ranking: 31st

As of 2025–26 season:

Locations of teams in the Syrian Premier League

	Club	Location
1	Al-Fotuwa SC	Deir ez-Zor
2	Al-Hurriya SC	Aleppo
3	**Al-Ittihad SC**	Aleppo
4	Al-Jaish SC	Damascus
5	Al-Karamah SC	Homs
6	Al-Shorta SC	Damascus
7	Al-Shouleh	Daraa
8	Al-Wahda SC	Damascus
9	Damascus Al-Ahli	Damascus
10	Homs Al Fidaa SC	Homs
11	Hutteen SC	Latakia
12	Jableh SC	Jableh
13	Khan Shaykhun	Khan Shaykhun
14	Omaya SC	Idlib
15	Taliya SC	Hama
16	Tishreen SC	Latakia

== Tajikistan ==
- Football association:
  - Tajikistan Football Federation
  - Tajik: Федеросиюни футболи Тоҷикистон
    (Federosijuni futboli Tojikiston)
- Top-level league:
  - Tajikistan Higher League
  - Tajik: Лигаи Олии Тоҷикистон
    (Ligai Olii Tojikiston)
- 2026 AFC ranking: 23rd

As of 2026 season:

Locations of teams in the 2026 Tajikistan Higher League

	Club	Location
1	Barkchi	Hisor
2	CSKA Pamir Dushanbe	Dushanbe
3	Eskhata Khujand	Khujand
4	**FC Istiklol**	Dushanbe
5	FK Istaravshan	Istaravshan
6	FK Khujand	Khujand
7	Khosilot Farkhor	Farkhor
8	Parvoz Bobojon Ghafurov	Khujand
9	Ravshan Kulob	Kulob
10	Regar-TadAZ	Tursunzoda
11	Sardor	Tursunzoda
12	Vakhsh Bokhtar	Bokhtar

== Thailand ==
- Football association:
  - Football Association of Thailand
  - Thai: สมาคมกีฬาฟุตบอลแห่งประเทศไทย ในพระบรมราชูปถัมภ์
    (S̄mākhm Kīḷā Futbxl h̄æ̀ng Pratheṣ̄thịy Nı Phrabrm Rāchūpt̄hạmp̣h̒)
- Top-level league:
  - Thai League 1
  - Thai: ไทยลีก 1
    (Thịy Līk H̄nụ̀ng)
- 2026 AFC ranking: 7th

As of 2025–26 season:

Locations of the 2025–26 Thai League teams
Football clubs in the Bangkok Metropolitan Region

	Club	Location
1	Ayutthaya United	Ayutthaya
2	Bangkok United	Pathum Thani
3	BG Pathum United	Pathum Thani
4	**Buriram United**	Buriram
5	Chiangrai United	Chiangrai
6	Chonburi	Chonburi
7	Kanchanaburi Power	Kanchanaburi
8	Lamphun Warriors	Lamphun
9	Muangthong United	Nonthaburi
10	Nakhon Ratchasima	Nakhon Ratchasima
11	Port FC	Bangkok
12	PT Prachuap	Prachuap Khiri Khan
15	Ratchaburi Mitr Phol	Ratchaburi
16	Rayong	Rayong
17	Sukhothai	Sukhothai
18	Uthai Thani	Uthai Thani

== Timor-Leste ==
- Football association:
  - East Timor Football Federation
  - Tetun: Federacao de Futebol de Timor Lorosa'e
- Top-level league: Liga Futebol Amadora Primeira Divisão
- 2026 AFC ranking: 44th

As of 2025 season:

Locations of the 2025 LFA Primera teams

	Club	Location
1	AS Académica	Dili
2	AS Marca FC	Dili
3	AS Ponta Leste	Dili
4	Assalam FC	Dili
5	Coração FC	Manatuto
6	DIT FC	Dili
7	Emmanuel FC	Dili
8	FC Porto Taibesse	Dili
9	**Karketu Dili**	Dili
10	Sport Laulara e Benfica	Laulara

== Turkmenistan ==
- Football association:
  - Football Federation of Turkmenistan
  - Turkmen: Türkmenistanyň Futbol Federasiýasy
- Top-level league:
  - Ýokary Liga
  - Turkmen: Türkmenistanyň Ýokary Ligasy
- 2026 AFC ranking: 19th

As of 2026 season:

Location of teams in the Ýokary Liga

	Club	Location
1	**Arkadag**	Arkadag
2	Ahal	Anau
3	Altyn Asyr	Ashgabat
4	FC Aşgabat	Ashgabat
5	FK Köpetdag	Ashgabat
6	Merw FK	Mary
7	Nebitçi FT	Balkanabat
8	Şagadam FK	Türkmenbaşy

== United Arab Emirates ==
- Football association:
  - United Arab Emirates Football Association
  - Arabic: الاتحاد الاماراتي لكرة القدم
    (Al-Ittiḥād Al-Imārātī Likurat Al-Qadam)
- Top-level league:
  - UAE Pro League
  - Arabic: دوري المحترفين لدولة الإمارات العربية المتحدة
    (Dawrī Al-Muḥtarifīn Lidawlat Al-Imārāt Al-ʿArabīyah Al-Muttaḥidah)
- 2026 AFC ranking: 4th

As of 2025–26 season:

Locations of teams in the UAE Pro League

	Club	Location
1	Ajman Club	Ajman
2	Al Ain FC	Al Ain
3	Al Bataeh Club	Al Bataeh
4	Al Dhafra FC	Madinat Zayed
5	Al-Ittihad Kalba	Kalba
6	Al Jazira Club	Abu Dhabi
7	Al Nasr SC	Dubai
8	Al Wahda FC	Abu Dhabi
9	Al Wasl FC	Dubai
10	Baniyas Club	Abu Dhabi
11	Dibba Al Hisn	Dibba Al-Hisn
12	Khor Fakkan	Khor Fakkan
13	**Shabab Al-Ahli**	Dubai
14	Sharjah FC	Sharjah

== Uzbekistan ==
- Football association:
  - Uzbekistan Football Association
  - Uzbek: Oʻzbekiston Futbol Assotsiatsiyasi
- Top-level league:
  - Uzbekistan Super League
  - Uzbek: O'zbekiston Superligasi
- 2026 AFC ranking: 10th

As of 2026 season:

Location of teams in 2026 Uzbekistan Super League

	Club	Location
1	FC AGMK	Olmaliq
2	FK Andijon	Andijan
3	FC Bukhara	Bukhara
4	FC Bunyodkor	Tashkent
5	FC Dinamo	Samarkand
6	FC Khorazm	Urgench
7	FK Mash'al Mubarek	Mubarek
8	FC Nasaf	Qarshi
9	**FC Neftchi**	Fergana
10	FC Qizilqum	Zarafshon
11	FC Sogdiana	Jizzakh
12	FK Kokand 1912	Kokand
13	Pakhtakor FK	Tashkent
14	PFC Navbahor	Namangan
15	PFC Lokomotiv	Tashkent
16	PFC Surkhon	Termez

== Vietnam ==
- Football association:
  - Vietnam Football Federation
  - Vietnamese: Liên Đoàn Bóng Đá Việt Nam
- Top-level league:
  - V.League 1
  - Vietnamese: Giải Bóng Đá Vô Địch Quốc Gia Việt Nam
- 2026 AFC ranking: 15th

As of 2025–26 season:

Locations of the 2025–26 V.League 1 teams

	Club	Location
1	Becamex Ho Chi Minh City	Ho Chi Minh City
2	Cong An Ho Chi Minh City	Ho Chi Minh City
3	Haiphong	Hai Phong
4	Hanoi	Hanoi
5	Hoang Anh Gia Lai	Pleiku
6	Hong Linh Ha Tinh	Ha Tinh
7	Ninh Binh	Ninh Binh
8	**Thep Xanh Nam Dinh**	Nam Dinh
9	Cong An Ha Noi	Hanoi
10	PVF-CAND	Hưng Yên
11	SHB Da Nang	Da Nang
12	Song Lam Nghe An	Vinh
13	Dong A Thanh Hoa	Thanh Hoa
14	The Cong-Viettel	Hanoi

=== Vietnam Women's Football League ===
As of the 2022 season:

Locations of the Women's Football League venues

	Club	Location
01	Hanoi	Hanoi
02	Hanoi II	Hanoi
03	**Ho Chi Minh City**	Ho Chi Minh City
04	Ho Chi Minh City II	Ho Chi Minh City
05	Phong Phu Ha Nam	Ha Nam
06	Thai Nguyen T&T	Thai Nguyen
07	Than KSVN	Quang Ninh
08	Son La	Son La

== Yemen ==
- Football association:
  - Yemen Football Association
  - Arabic: الاتحاد اليمني لكرة القدم
    (Al-Ittiḥād Al-Yamanī Likurat Al-Qadam)
- Top-level league:
  - Yemeni League
  - Arabic: الدوري اليمني
    (Ad-Dawrī Al-Yamanī)
- 2026 AFC ranking: 43rd

As of 2023–24 season:

Locations of teams in the 2014–15 Yemeni League

	Club	Location
1	**Ahli Sanaa Club**	Sanaa
2	Al-Hilal Al-Sahili	Hodeidah
3	Al-Ittihad SCC	Ibb
4	Al-Oruba	Zabid
5	Al-Tadamun Hadramaut	Mukalla
6	Al-Tali'aa Taizz	Taiz
7	Al-Saqr	Taiz
8	Al-Shaab Hadramaut	Mukalla
9	Al-Wehda SCC	Sanaa
10	Al-Yarmuk Al-Rawda	Sanaa
11	Fahman	Mudiyah
12	Salam Al-Garaf	Al-Garaf
13	Shaab Ibb SCC	Ibb
14	Samaon	Sanaa

== See also ==
- List of second division football clubs in AFC countries
- List of top-division football clubs in CAF countries
- List of top-division football clubs in CONCACAF countries
- List of top-division football clubs in CONMEBOL countries
- List of top-division football clubs in OFC countries
- List of top-division football clubs in UEFA countries
- List of top-division football clubs in non-FIFA countries
