= Farhan Khan (footballer) =

Pakistani footballer (2000 or 2001 – 2024)

Personal information
- Full name: Farhan Bahraman Khan
- Date of birth: 2000 or 2001
- Place of birth: Swabi, Pakistan
- Date of death: 1 March 2024 (aged 23)
- Place of death: Swabi, Pakistan
- Position: Forward

Senior career*
Years	Team	Apps	(Gls)
2020–2021	Masha United		
2021–2022	Sui Northern Gas		
2022–2024	Pakistan Air Force		

International career
2019	Pakistan U19		
- * Club domestic league appearances and goals

Farhan Bahraman Khan (2000 or 2001 – 1 March 2024) was a Pakistani footballer who represented the national under-19 team. He was part of the 23-man squad at the 2020 AFC U-19 Championship qualification. He also represented Masha United, SNGPL, and the Pakistan Air Force departmental team in Pakistan's domestic football.

== Early life ==
Khan hailed from Maniri Payan village in Swabi.

== Club career ==
Khan started his career with Masha United in 2020. He later represented the SNGPL departmental football team during the 2021–22 Pakistan Premier League. He was an active player for Pakistan Air Force until his death.

== International career ==
Khan represented the Pakistan under-19 team in the 2020 AFC U-19 Championship qualification. He went on to make four appearances in the campaign.

== Death ==
Farhan Khan died in a hit-and-run road incident in his hometown Swabi on 1 March 2024. The incident took place near Sadat CNG on Jahangira Road in Swabi city, where a speeding car hit his bike, injuring him severely. He was first taken to the District Headquarters Hospital in Swabi and later referred to Combined Military Hospital, Rawalpindi, where he succumbed to his injuries.

=== Aftermath ===
Pakistan Football Federation (PFF) expressed deep sorrow and condolence over the demise of Farhan. In a social media post, the PFF mourned and said that Farhan Khan's spirit, on and off the field, will always be remembered. They also extended their "thoughts and prayers to his family and friends during this difficult time".

Farhan's family demanded immediate arrest and strict punishment of those responsible for the accident.

== See also ==
- Nasir Iqbal (footballer)
