= 2013 PFF League =

PFF League
- Season: 2013
- Dates: 29 November – 28 December
- Champions: Pakistan Railways
- Promoted: Pakistan Railways; Baloch Quetta
- Biggest home win: Milli Afghan vs Green Star; 5–2

The 2013 PFF League (PFFL) was the 10th season of second tier of Pakistan Football Federation. The season started on 29 November 2013 and concluded on 28 December 2013. The event took place in Lahore, Layyah and Karachi.

== Teams ==
=== Teams relegated from 2012–13 Pakistan Premier League ===
- PMC Club Athletico Faisalabad
- Wohaib

== Departmental phase ==
=== Group stages ===
==== Group A ====
Pos	Team	Pld	W	D	L	GF	GA	GD	Pts	Qualification
1	Sui Southern Gas Company	2	2	0	0	7	1	+6	6	Advance to club phase
2	Social Welfare	2	0	1	1	1	4	−3	1	Advance to club phase
3	Falcon Company	2	0	1	1	0	3	−3	1	

Source: GSA
1 December 2018
15:00 PST

Sui Southern Gas Company	4–1	Social Welfare
	Report

Korangi Baloch Stadium, Karachi
3 December 2013
15:00 PST

Falcon Company	0–0	Social Welfare
	Report

Korangi Baloch Stadium, Karachi
5 December 2013
15:00 PST

Sui Southern Gas Company	3–0	Falcon Company
	Report

Korangi Baloch Stadium, Karachi

==== Group B ====
Pos	Team	Pld	W	D	L	GF	GA	GD	Pts	Qualification
1	Karachi United	2	1	1	0	2	1	+1	4	Advance to club phase
2	Pakistan Steel	2	1	0	1	2	2	0	3	Advance to club phase
3	Insaf AC	2	0	1	1	0	1	−1	1	

Source: GSA
2 December 2013
12:30 PST

Pakistan Steel	1–0	Insaf
	Report

Korangi Baloch Stadium, Karachi
4 December 2013
15:00 PST

Karachi United	2–1	Pakistan Steel
	Report

Korangi Baloch Stadium, Karachi
6 December 2013
15:00 PST

Karachi United	0–0	Insaf AC
	Report

Korangi Baloch Stadium, Karachi

==== Group C ====
Pos	Team	Pld	W	D	L	GF	GA	GD	Pts	Qualification
1	Pakistan Police	2	2	0	0	5	2	+3	6	Advance to club phase
2	Gwadar Port Authority	2	1	0	1	3	3	0	3	Advance to club phase
3	Pakistan Public Works Department	2	0	0	2	1	4	−3	0	

Source: SCW
1 December 2013
15;00 PST

Pakistan Police	2–1	Pakistan Public Works Department
	Report

Korangi Baloch Stadium, Karachi
3 December 2013
12:30 PST

Gwadar Port Authority	2–0	Pakistan Public Works Department
	Report

Korangi Baloch Stadium, Karachi
5 December 2013
15:00 PST

Pakistan Police	3–1	Gwadar Port Authority
	Report

Korangi Baloch Stadium, Karachi

==== Group D ====
Pos	Team	Pld	W	D	L	GF	GA	GD	Pts	Qualification
1	Higher Education Commission	2	2	0	0	6	0	+6	6	Advance to club phase
2	Bhatti United	2	1	0	1	2	4	−2	3	Advance to club phase
3	Pakistan Television	2	0	0	2	1	5	−4	0	

Source: SCW
29 November 2013
14:30 PST

Pakistan Television	3–0	Higher Education Commission
	Report

Punjab University Campus, Lahore
1 December 2013
14:30

Bhatti United	2–1	Pakistan Television
	Report

Punjab University Campus, Lahore
3 December 2013
14:30 PST

Bhatti United	0–3	Higher Education Commission
	Report

Punjab University Campus, Lahore

==== Group E ====
Pos	Team	Pld	W	D	L	GF	GA	GD	Pts	Qualification
1	Pakistan Railways	2	2	0	0	2	0	+2	6	Advance to club phase
2	Ashraf Sugar Mills	2	1	0	1	3	1	+2	3	Advance to club phase
3	Aqua Water Company	2	0	0	2	0	4	−4	0	

Source: GSA
3 December 2013
14:30 PST

Ashraf Sugar Mills	3–0	Aqua Water Company
	Report

Garhi Shahu's Railway Stadium, Lahore
5 December 2013
14:30 PST

Pakistan Railways	1–0	Aqua Water Company
	Report

Garhi Shahu's Railway Stadium, Lahore
7 December 2013
14:30 PST

Pakistan Railways	1–0	Ashraf Sugar Mills
	Report

Garhi Shahu's Railway Stadium, Lahore

== Club phase ==
=== Groups ===
==== Group A ====
Pos	Team	Pld	W	D	L	GF	GA	GD	Pts	Qualification
1	Baloch Quetta	2	1	1	0	3	1	+2	4	Advance to club phase
2	Chand Layyah	2	0	2	0	1	1	0	2	Advance to club phase
3	PMC Club Athletico Faisalabad	2	0	1	1	0	2	−2	1	

Source: GSA
10 December 2013
14:00 PST

PMC Club Athletico Faisalabad	0–0	Chand Layyah
	Report

Layyah Football Stadium, Layyah
12 December 2013
14:00 PST

Baloch Quetta	1–1	Chand Layyah
	Report

Layyah Football Stadium, Layyah
14 December 2013
14:00 PST

PMC Club Athletico Faisalabad	0–2	Baloch Quetta
	Report

Layyah Football Stadium, Layyah

==== Group B ====
Pos	Team	Pld	W	D	L	GF	GA	GD	Pts	Qualification
1	Milli Afghan	2	2	0	0	6	2	+4	6	Advance to 2nd phase club leg
2	Wohaib	2	1	0	1	1	1	0	3	Advance to 2nd phase club leg
3	Green Star	2	0	0	2	2	6	−4	0	

Source: GSA
10 December 2013
14:00 PST

Milli Afghan	1–0	Wohaib
	Report

Fame Football Stadium, Lahore
12 December 2013
14:00 PST

Milli Afghan	5–2	Green Star
	Report

Fame Football Stadium, Lahore
14 December 2013
14:00 PST

Wohaib	1–0	Green Star

Fame Football Stadium, Lahore

==== Group C ====
Pos	Team	Pld	W	D	L	GF	GA	GD	Pts	Qualification
1	Baloch Dalbandin	2	2	0	0	4	1	+3	6	Advance to 2nd phase club leg
2	Young Blood	2	1	0	1	2	3	−1	3	Advance to 2nd phase club leg
3	Huma	2	0	0	2	0	2	−2	0	

Source: SCW
8 December 2013
14:00 PST

Young Blood	1–0	Huma
	Report

Ali Rai Nawaz Stadium, Sahiwal
10 December 2013
14:00 PST

Baloch Dalbandin	1–0	Huma
	Report

Ali Rai Nawaz Stadium, Sahiwal
12 December 2013
14:00 PST

Baloch Dalbandin	3–1	Young Blood
	Report

Ali Rai Nawaz Stadium, Sahiwal

== 2nd departmental-phase leg ==
Pos	Team	Pld	W	D	L	GF	GA	GD	Pts	Qualification
1	Pakistan Railways	4	3	0	1	8	5	+3	9	Advance to Final
2	Higher Education Commission	4	2	1	1	9	3	+6	7	
3	Sui Southern Gas Company	4	2	0	2	6	3	+3	6	
4	Pakistan Police	4	1	1	2	6	12	−6	4	
5	Karachi United	4	0	2	2	4	10	−6	2	

Updated to match(es) played on unknown. Source: SCW
13 December 2013
11:00 PST

Pakistan Police	1–0	Sui Southern Gas Company
	Report

KPT Stadium, Karachi
13 December 2013
15:00 PST

Karachi United	1–1	Higher Education Commission
	Report

KPT Stadium, Karachi
15 December 2013
12:30 PST

Karachi United	0–4	Sui Southern Gas Company
	Report

KPT Stadium, Karachi
15 December 2013
15:00 PST

Higher Education Commission	2–1	Pakistan Railways
	Report

KPT Stadium, Karachi
17 December 2013
12:30 PST

Pakistan Railways	3–2	Pakistan Police
	Report

KPT Stadium, Karachi
17 December 2013
15:00 PST

Sui Southern Gas Company	1–0	Higher Education Commission
	Report

KPT Stadium, Karachi
19 December 2013
12:30 PST

Pakistan Railways	2–0	Karachi United
	Report

KPT Stadium, Karachi
19 December 2013
15:00 PST

Higher Education Commission	6–0	Pakistan Police
	Report

KPT Stadium, Karachi
21 December 2013
12:30 PST

Pakistan Railways	2–1	Sui Southern Gas Company
	Report

KPT Stadium, Karachi
21 December 2013
15:00 PST

Karachi United	3–3	Pakistan Police
	Report

KPT Stadium, Karachi

== 2nd phase club leg ==
Pos	Team	Pld	W	D	L	GF	GA	GD	Pts	Qualification
1	Baloch Quetta	2	1	1	0	2	0	+2	4	Advance to final
2	Milli Afghan	2	1	0	1	2	2	0	3	Advance to final
3	Baloch Dalbandin	2	0	1	1	0	2	−2	1	

Source: GSA
17 December 2013
14:00 PST

Baloch Quetta	0–0	Baloch Dalbandin
	Report

Layyah Football Stadium, Layyah
19 December 2013
14:00 PST

Milli Afghan	2–0	Baloch Dalbandin
	Report

Layyah Football Stadium, Layyah
21 December 2013
14:00 PST

Baloch Quetta	2–0	Milli Afghan
	Report

Layyah Football Stadium, Layyah

== Final ==
28 December 2013
14:00 PST

Pakistan Railways	2–0	Baloch Quetta
	Report

Garhi Shahu's Railway Stadium, Lahore
