= Milli Afghan FC =

Pakistani football club

Milli Afghan
- Full name: Milli Afghan Football Club
- Short name: MA
- Manager: Qazi Jalal

Milli Afghan Football Club is a football club based in Quetta, Pakistan. It last competed in the second-tier 2014 PFF League.

== History ==
In the 2013 PFF League, the club advanced to the second round after victories over Wohaib and Green Star, the latter being the largest victory of the tournament by 5–2. At the second round, the club finished second after Baloch Quetta by one point, thus failing to advance to the final.

In the 2014 PFF League, the club finished last in the group C of the first round. This was before the ban on Pakistan Football Federation by FIFA, which led to years of inactivity in domestic football.

== Competitive record ==
The club's competitive records since the 2013–14 season are listed below.

Season	Div	Tms	Pos	National Challenge Cup	AFC President's Cup	AFC Cup
2013–14	PFF League	24	2nd phase	DNP	DNP	DNP
2014–15	PFF League	12	Group stages	DNP	DNP	DNP
