= 2012 PFF League =

PFF League
- Season: 2012
- Dates: 13 November – 21 December
- Champions: Lyallpur
- Promoted: Lyallpur; PACA

The 2012–13 PFF League was the 9th season of the second tier of Pakistan's football league system. The season started on 13 November 2012 and concluded on 21 December 2012.

== Departmental leg ==
=== Group A ===
Pos	Team	Pld	W	D	L	GF	GA	GD	Pts
1	Pakistan Steel	2	1	1	0	3	1	+2	3
2	Pakistan Police	2	1	1	0	3	2	+1	3
3	Pakistan Public Works Department	2	0	0	2	1	4	0	0

13 November 2012
14:00

Pakistan Steel	2–0	Pakistan Public Works Department
	Report

Steel Town Football Ground, Karachi
16 November 2012
14:00

Pakistan Police	2–1	Pakistan Public Works Department
	Report

Steel Town Football Ground, Karachi
19 November 2012
14:00

Pakistan Steel	1–1	Pakistan Police
	Report

Steel Town Football Ground, Karachi

=== Group B ===
Pos	Team	Pld	W	D	L	GF	GA	GD	Pts
1	PACA	2	1	1	0	4	1	+3	3
2	Asia Sugar Mills	2	0	2	0	1	1	0	2
3	Sindh Government Press	2	0	1	2	0	3	-3	1

14 November 2012
14:00

PACA	3–0	Sindh Government Press
	Report

All Brothers Football Ground, Karachi
17 November 2012
14:00

Asia Sugar Mills	0–0	Sindh Government Press
	Report

All Brothers Football Ground, Karachi
20 November 2012
14:00

PACA	1–1	Asia Sugar Mills
	Report

All Brothers Football Ground, Karachi

=== Group C ===
Pos	Team	Pld	W	D	L	GF	GA	GD	Pts
1	Sui Southern Gas Company	2	2	0	0	9	0	+9	4
2	Gwadar Port Authority	2	1	0	1	1	4	-3	2
3	Insaf Afghan Goods	2	0	0	2	0	6	-6	0

15 November 2012
14:00

Sui Southern Gas Company	5–0	Insaf Afghan Goods
	Report

Korangi Baloch Stadium, Karachi
18 November 2012
14:00

Gwadar Port Authority	1–0	Insaf Afghan Goods
	Report

Korangi Baloch Stadium, Karachi
21 November 2012
14:00

Sui Southern Gas Company	4–0	Gwadar Port Authority
	Report

Korangi Baloch Stadium, Karachi

=== Group D ===
Pos	Team	Pld	W	D	L	GF	GA	GD	Pts
1	Higher Education Commission	4	2	2	0	6	2	+4	6
2	Pakistan Railways	4	2	2	0	7	4	+3	6
3	Bhatti United	4	2	2	0	6	3	+3	6
4	Social Welfare	4	0	1	3	1	5	-4	1
5	Pakistan Television	4	0	1	3	2	8	-6	1

29 November 2012
12:30

Social Welfare	0–0	Pakistan Television
	Report

Model Town Football Ground, Lahore
29 November 2012
14:00

Pakistan Railways	1–1	Bhatti United
	Report

Railways Stadium, Lahore
1 December 2012
12:30

Pakistan Railways	2–1	Social Welfare
	Report

Railways Stadium, Lahore
1 December 2012
14:00

Higher Education Commission	3–0	Pakistan Railways
	Report

Model Town Football Ground, Lahore
3 December 2012
12:30

Pakistan Railways	1–1	Higher Education Commission
	Report

Railways Stadium, Lahore
3 December 2012
14:00

Social Welfare	0–2	Bhatti United
	Report

Model Town Football Ground, Lahore
5 December 2012
12:30

Bhatti United	2–1	Pakistan Television
	Report

Railways Stadium, Lahore
5 December 2012
14:00

Social Welfare	0–1	Higher Education Commission
	Report

Model Town Football Ground, Lahore
7 December 2012
14:00

Higher Education Commission	1–1	Bhatti United
	Report

Model Town Football Ground, Lahore
7 December 2012
14:00

Pakistan Railways	3–1	Pakistan Television
	Report

Railways Stadium, Lahore

=== Final round ===
Pos	Team	Pld	W	D	L	GF	GA	GD	Pts
1	Pakistan Railways	4	3	0	1	4	2	+2	9
2	Sui Southern Gas Company	4	2	2	0	4	1	+3	8
3	PACA	4	2	1	1	9	4	+5	7
4	Pakistan Steel	4	1	0	3	3	7	-4	3
5	Higher Education Commission	4	0	1	3	1	7	-6	1

== Club leg ==
=== Group A ===
Pos	Team	Pld	W	D	L	GF	GA	GD	Pts
1	Green Star	2	1	1	0	3	0	+3	3
2	Balaach	2	1	0	1	5	3	-3	2
3	Capital Development Authority	2	0	1	1	0	5	-6	1

13 November 2012
14:00

Green Star	3–0	Balaach
	Report

Municipal Football Stadium, Okara
15 November 2012
14:00

Baalach	5–0	Capital Development Authority
	Report

Municipal Football Stadium, Okara
17 November 2012
14:00

Capital Development Authority	0–0	Green Star
	Report

Municipal Football Stadium, Okara

=== Group B ===
Pos	Team	Pld	W	D	L	GF	GA	GD	Pts
1	Chand Layyah	2	1	1	0	2	1	+1	3
2	Afghan Sports	2	1	0	1	2	1	-1	2
3	Eleven Star	2	0	1	1	1	3	-2	0

15 November 2012
14:00

Chand Layyah	1–0	Afghan Sports

Layyah Football Stadium, Layyah
17 November 2012
14:00

Chand Layyah	1–1	Eleven Star
	Report

Layyah Football Stadium, Layyah
19 November 2012
14:00

Afghan Sports	2–0	Eleven Star

Layyah Football Stadium, Layyah

=== Final round ===
Pos	Team	Pld	W	D	L	GF	GA	GD	Pts
1	Lyallpur	4	2	2	0	10	2	+8	6
2	Young Blood	4	2	1	1	6	3	+3	5
3	Baloch Quetta	4	2	1	1	6	7	-1	5
4	Chand Layyah	4	1	1	2	6	8	-2	3
5	Green Star	4	0	1	3	2	10	-8	1

== Final ==
21 December 2012
14:00

Lyallpur	3–0	PACA
	Report

Ali Rai Nawaz Stadium, Sahiwal
