= Drigh Road Union Football Stadium =

Football ground in Pakistan

- ڈرِِگ روڈ یونین فُٹبال اسٹیڈیم
- Interactive map of Drigh Road Union Football Stadium
- Location: Cantt Bazar Rd, Shah Faisal Colony, Karachi
- Coordinates: 24°53′02.2″N 67°07′38.0″E
- Public transit: Drigh Road Railway Station
- Capacity: 5,000
- Field size: 120 by 68 metres (131.2 yd × 74.4 yd)
- Surface: Grass

Website
- https://dufc.business.site/

Drigh Road Union Football Stadium is a football ground in Shah Faisal Colony in Karachi, Pakistan. Constructed in 1958, it hosts local and domestic matches, including those of Pakistan Premier League and the PPF League. It was named after the nearby Drigh Road, which was later renamed as Shahrah-e-Faisal.

The ground is home to Drigh Road Union Football Club.

== Events ==
The ground has hosted both local and domestic matches since its construction. It hosted seven group-stage fixtures in the ninth edition of the Karachi Football League 2011-12 hosted by Karachi United and organized by the KU Football Foundation (KUFF).

It also hosted all Group A and the Final Round Departmental Leg fixtures (17 in total) of the 12th Pakistan Football Federation League ‘B’ Division 2020.

== Transport ==
The ground is a five-minute walk away from the Drigh Road Railway Station, which is also to be the final stop of the Karachi Circular Railway. The Drigh Road bus stop is a four-minute drive away.
