= Quaid-e-Azam FC =

Pakistani football club

- Nickname: QFC
- Founded: 1971
- Ground: Embassy Road G 6/4 islamabad, Pakistan
- Capacity: 1,000
- Chairman: Muhammad Saleem
- Manager: Ghulam Rasool
- League: IFA 'A' League
Home colours	Away colours	Third colours

Quaid-e-Azam Football Club, is a Pakistani football club based in Islamabad, Pakistan.

== History ==
The club was founded in 1971. It regularly featured in the regional Islamabad Football League in the early 2000s.

In 2010, during a Pakistan Football Federation scrutiny of Islamabad clubs, Quaid-e-Azam was listed among the 34 active clubs of the Islamabad Football Association. It continued featuring in the Islamabad Football League, and several tournaments in Islamabad in the 2010s. On 9 January 2014, The Nation reported allegations of rules violations by the Islamabad Football Association, naming Quaid-e-Azam FC secretary Ghulam Rasool as having been appointed to supervise a lower-division match despite lacking formal qualifications.

In 2018, Quaid-e-Azam FC moved into the final of the Islamabad A-Division Meridian Football League pertaining to the Islamabad Football Association, after winning against Poona FC 1–0 in the semifinal. The team lost in the final to Kiran FC on penalties.
