= HBL =

HBL may refer to:

- HBL F.C., a Pakistani football club
- HBL Pakistan, a Pakistani bank
- Habib Bank Limited cricket team, a Pakistani cricket team
- Handball-Bundesliga, a professional handball league in Germany
- Himalayan Bank Limited, a Nepalese bank
- Homer D. Babbidge Library, an American academic library
- Hrvatski biografski leksikon (Croatian Biographical Lexicon)
- Hufvudstadsbladet, a Swedish-language newspaper in Finland
