= Huma FC =

Pakistani association football team

Huma F.C.
- Full name: Huma Football Club
- Short name: HFC
- Founded: 1978; 48 years ago
- Ground: Huma FC Ground
- President: Zakir Hussain Naqvi
- Manager: Muhammad Fareed
- League: Pakistan Premier League
Home colours	Away colours

Huma Football Club is a professional football club based in Islamabad, Pakistan. It currently competes in the Pakistan Premier League.

== History ==
Huma was founded in 1978. In 2000, the club played a test match against the Pakistan national team, ending in a 0–2 defeat. In 2007, it took part in the Islamabad Division Football League. In the 2013 PFF League, Huma was drawn in group C. It finished bottom of its group. In the 2014 PFF League, Huma ended up second in group A.

After six years, it made its return to the PFF League, in the 2020 edition. It defeated Jeay Laal, Lyallpur, Young Ittefaq, and Wohaib in its group. The final match was between the top two teams, Huma and Baloch Quetta, where the winner would earn promotion to the 2021 Pakistan Premier League. Both teams were previously undefeated in the tournament. Huma was defeated in the final, and therefore, was not promoted.

In 2020, Huma returned to the PFF National Challenge Cup, and also returned for the 2021–22 Pakistan Premier League.

== Stadium ==
The club owns the Huma FC Ground in F-6, Islamabad, which serves as their own stadium.

== Players ==
=== Current squad ===
As of 1 August 2023

Note: Flags indicate national team as defined under FIFA eligibility rules; some limited exceptions apply. Players may hold more than one non-FIFA nationality.

No.	Pos.	Nation	Player
—	GK	PAK	Usman Ali
—	GK	PAK	Haider Bilal Awan
—	GK	PAK	Umer Farooq
—	DF	PAK	Waseem Ullah
—	DF	PAK	Abdul Wahid
—	DF	PAK	Daniyal Hussain
—	DF	PAK	Anhar Ahmed
—	DF	PAK	Muhammad Talha
—	DF	PAK	Nafees Liaqat
—	DF	PAK	Muhammad Wasif
—	DF	PAK	Farhan Ullah
—	DF	PAK	Salman Hayat
—	DF	PAK	Umer Afzal
—	MF	AFG	Maihan Tour Faizee
—	MF	PAK	Imran Ali
—	MF	PAK	Waheed ur Rehman
—	MF	PAK	Maab Ali

No.	Pos.	Nation	Player
—	MF	PAK	Ejaz Ahmed
—	MF	PAK	Manzoor Ali
—	MF	PAK	Sardar Abbas
—	MF	PAK	Ali Imam Shah
—	MF	PAK	Muhamad Ibraheem
—	FW	PAK	Hamza Shabeer
—	FW	PAK	Syed Wajahat
—	FW	PAK	Zain Ul Islam
—	FW	PAK	Mustansir Nawaz
—	FW	PAK	Maaz Arshad
—	FW	PAK	Khaleeq Zaman Zahid
—	FW	PAK	Ahmed Hassan
—	FW	PAK	Imam Hussain
—	FW	PAK	Amar Iqbal
—	FW	PAK	Raheel Azhar
—	FW	AFG	Muhammad Jawad

== Personnel ==
=== Current technical staff ===
As of 1 August 2023

Position	Name
Head Coach	(Pakistan) Ghulam Fareed
Assistant Coach	(Pakistan) Sajjad Hafeez
Team Manager	(Pakistan) Aziz Ullah Soomro
Assistant Team Manager	(Pakistan) Nasir Jameel
Physiotherapist	(Pakistan) Sajid Ali

== Competitive record ==
The club's competitive records since the 2013–14 season are listed below.

Season	Div	Tms	Pos	National Challenge Cup	AFC President's Cup	AFC Cup
2013–14	PFF League	24	Group stage	DNP	DNP	DNP
2014–15	PFF League	30	Group stage	DNP	DNP	DNP
2020–21	PFF League	19	Group stage	Group stage	DNP	DNP
