= Green Star FC =

Pakistani football club

- Full name: Green Star Football Club
- League: PFF League
- 2013 PFF League: Group stage

Green Star Football Club is a Pakistani football club based in Okara, Punjab.

== History ==
The club made its professional debut in the 2012 PFF League. It finished at the top of the group A of the club leg, after winning by 3–0 against Balaach from Nushki, and drawing 0–0 to Capital Development Authority. In the final group stage comprising five teams, the club finished at the end, failing to qualify for the final. In the next 2013 season, the club finished third in the group B of the club phase, losing by 2–5 to Milli Afghan, and 0–1 to Wohaib, failing to qualify for the second phase of the club leg.

== Competitive record ==
The club's competitive records since the 2012 season are listed below.

Season	Div	Tms	Pos	National Challenge Cup	AFC President's Cup	AFC Cup
2012–13	Football Federation League	20	Final group stage	DNP	DNP	DNP
2013–14	Football Federation League	24	Group stage	DNP	DNP	DNP
