= 2021–22 Pakistan Premier League =

62nd season of Pakistan Premier League

Pakistan Premier League
- Season: 2021–22
- Dates: 14 August 2021 – 9 November 2021
- Champions: None
- Relegated: None

The 2021–22 Pakistan Premier League season was an abandoned season that was supposed to be the 62nd season of Pakistani domestic football and the 13th season of the Pakistan Premier League. Each team was scheduled to play every other team twice, for a total of 22 games. The league was not recognised by FIFA, as it was organized by the then PFF President, Ashfaq Hussain Shah, who came to power after forcibly taking control of the PFF office. The tournament was suspended after a few months into the season and then cancelled.

== Overview ==
On 27 March 2021, the PFF's office was attacked and people inside held hostage by its former controversially elected president, Syed Ashfaq Hussain Shah, and his group, who again came to power after attacking and taking charge of the PFF office.

Due to the attack FIFA imposed a suspension on the Pakistan Football Federation on 7 April 2021 with immediate effect due to third-party interference, which constitutes a serious violation of the FIFA statutes. Hence, no football activity was possible in Pakistan and the men's Pakistan Premier League was yet to start. The Ashfaq-led PFF group anyhow announced that the 2021 edition of PPL would be held from August.

The league was ultimately not recognised by FIFA, as it was organized by Ashfaq Hussain Shah. The tournament was suspended after a few months into the season and then cancelled. With only around a dozen of matches played by each team, WAPDA was the leading team with 24 points.

== Venues ==
The 2021–22 Pakistan Premier Football League was not played on a home-and-away basis. Matches were staged in centralised city legs, first at Ibn-e-Qasim Bagh Stadium, Multan (August to September 2021) and then at Municipal Football Stadium, Rawalpindi (from 14 October 2021). A Peshawar leg was announced for November but the season was eventually abandoned.

== Teams ==
Location of teams in Pakistan Premier League

=== Disbanded ===
K-Electric in 2020 announced that they will be shutting down their department, therefore didn't participate in the tournament.

=== Teams relegated to PFFL ===
Karachi Port Trust, Baloch Nushki, Ashraf Sugar Mills and Pakistan Airlines were relegated at the end of the 2018–19 season.

=== Teams promoted to Pakistan Premier League ===
Baloch Quetta got promoted after winning their leg in the 2020 PFF League. Masha United, Karachi United and Gwadar Port Authority also qualified for the league. Huma F.C. from Islamabad made their debut in the top tier, even though they didn't get promoted from the 2020 PFF League. Along with Lyallpur, they replaced the other teams which were not participating in the competition.

=== Teams not participating ===
Masha United, which was promoted to the top-tier, and Chaman major team Afghan FC decided to not participate in the event, saying it was being held by a federation which is not recognised by FIFA. National Bank was another team not featuring. Sources told "The News" that the majority of National Bank players had already passed their prime. Promoted sides Gwadar Port Authority and Baloch Quetta also declined to enter.

Team	Location
Lyallpur	Faisalabad
Civil Aviation Authority	Karachi
Karachi United	Karachi
Khan Research Laboratories	Rawalpindi
Huma	Islamabad
Muslim	Chaman
Sui Northern Gas	Lahore
Pakistan Air Force	Peshawar
Pakistan Army	Rawalpindi
Pakistan Navy	Islamabad
Sui Southern Gas	Karachi
WAPDA	Lahore

== Standings 2021-22 ==
Table before season interrupted and subsequently abandoned:

Pos	Team	Pld	W	D	L	GF	GA	GD	Pts	
1	WAPDA	11	7	3	1	20	7	+13	24	
2	Sui Southern Gas	12	7	2	3	27	9	+18	23	
3	Pakistan Air Force	11	7	2	2	23	9	+14	23	
4	Lyallpur	13	6	5	2	15	10	+5	23	
5	Muslim	14	6	2	6	15	28	−13	20	
6	Khan Research Laboratories	12	4	7	1	27	11	+16	19	
7	Civil Aviation Authority	13	5	3	5	10	14	−4	18	
8	Pakistan Army	11	4	4	3	16	7	+9	16	
9	Karachi United	13	4	1	8	13	26	−13	13	
10	Pakistan Navy	13	2	2	9	15	30	−15	8	
11	Sui Northern Gas	6	2	1	3	8	9	−1	7	
12	Huma	13	1	0	12	14	43	−29	3	
13	K-Electric (W)	0	0	0	0	0	0	0	0	Withdrew from the League.
14	National Bank (W)	0	0	0	0	0	0	0	0	Withdrew from the League.
15	Afghan Chaman (W)	0	0	0	0	0	0	0	0	Withdrew from the League.

Updated to match(es) played on 9 November 2021. Source: RSSSF
Rules for classification: 1) points; 2) head-to-head points; 3) head-to-head goal difference; 4) goal difference; 5) number of goals scored; 6) drawing of lots
(W) ?
