= Al-Garaf =

Al-Garaf الجراف
- Sub-district
- Country: Yemen
- Governorate: 'Amran Governorate
- District: Khamir District

Population (2004)
  - Total: 4,321
- Time zone: UTC+3

Al-Garaf (Arabic: الجراف) is a sub-district located in Khamir District, 'Amran Governorate, Yemen. Al-Garaf had a population of 4,321 according to the 2004 census.
