= Young Ittefaq FC =

Pakistani football club

Young Ittefaq
- Full name: Young Ittefaq Football Club
- Short name: YIFC
- Manager: Abdul Jabbar
- League: PFF League

Young Ittefaq is a Pakistani football club based in Chaman, Balochistan. It currently competes in the PFF League, the country's second-tier men's football competition.

== History ==
Young Ittefaq made its debut in the 2014–15 PFF League against Baloch Nushki. They lost their debut match 2–0 and were eliminated from the tournament.

In the 2020–21 PFF League, it was in the club leg along with Jeay Laal, Wohaib, Baloch Nushki and Lyallpur. The club finished fourth in the group.

== Competitive record ==
The club's competitive record since the 2014–15 season is listed below.

Season	Div	Tms	Pos	National Challenge Cup	AFC President's Cup	AFC Cup
2014–15	PFF League	30	Group stage	DNP	DNP	DNP
2020–21	PFF League	19	Group stage	DNP	DNP	DNP
