= 2020 PFF League =

PFF League
- Dates: 10 March - 15 October 2020
- Promoted: Baloch Quetta; Masha United; Karachi United; Gwadar Port Authority

The 2020 PFF League (PFFL) was the 12th season of second tier of Pakistan Football Federation. The season was scheduled to start on 10 March 2020 and conclude on 5 April 2020. However, it was shortened due to coronavirus in Pakistan.

== Promoted clubs ==
Team	Location	Stadium	Capacity
Baloch Quetta	Quetta	Ayub Football Stadium	10,000
Masha United			
Karachi United	Karachi	Karachi United Stadium	2,000
Gwadar Port Authority			

== Teams ==
A total of 18 teams contested the league:

Club Phase	Departmental Phase
Baloch Quetta; Jeay Laal; Lyallpur FC; Wohaib; Young Ittefaq; Humma FC	Aqua Pure Water FC; Atletico Academy Lahore; Gwadar Port Authority; Hazara Coal Company; Insaf Afghan Goods Trading Company; Karachi United; Masha United; PACA; Pakistan Police; Pakistan Railways; Pakistan Steel; Sindh Government Press; Social Welfare

== Departmental phase ==
=== Group A ===
Pos	Team	Pld	W	D	L	GF	GA	GD	Pts
1	Karachi United	2	2	0	0	4	0	+4	6
2	Gwadar Port Authority	3	2	0	1	6	6	0	6
3	Sindh Government Press	2	0	0	2	0	2	-2	0
4	Pakistan Steel	1	0	0	1	3	5	-2	0

13 March 2020
16:15

Gwadar Port Authority	5–3	Pakistan Steel
Sudir 25'; Naveed Dawood 26', 44'; Pervez Kouda 42'; Wajid 43'	Report	Naveed Raza 34'; Abdul Wahab 66'; Akram 89'

Drigh Road Union Football Stadium, Karachi
14 March 2020
16:15

Karachi United	1–0	Sindh Government Press
Amir 86'	Report

Drigh Road Union Football Stadium, Karachi
16 March 2020
16:15

Gwadar Port Authority	1–0	Sindh Government Press
Pervez Kouda 29'	Report

Drigh Road Union Football Stadium, Karachi
2 October 2020
16:15

Karachi United	3–0	Gwadar Port Authority
Aqib 76'; Anees 76'; Umer 91'	Report

Drigh Road Union Football Stadium, Karachi

=== Group B ===
Pos	Team	Pld	W	D	L	GF	GA	GD	Pts
1	Pakistan Police	4	3	1	0	6	1	+5	10
2	PACA	2	1	0	1	3	2	+1	3
3	Aqua Pure Water	2	0	2	0	1	1	0	2
4	Insaf Afghan Goods	3	0	1	2	1	5	-4	1
5	Social Welfare	1	0	0	1	0	2	-2	0

10 March 2020
16:15

Pakistan Police	2–1	PACA
Mohammad Naseem 70', 91'	Report	Fareed Ahmad 19'

Maali Bagh, Quetta
11 March 2020
16:15

Insaf Afghan Goods	1–1	Aqua Pure Water
Aimal Khan 72'	Report	Shah Khalid 89'

Maali Bagh, Quetta
13 March 2020
16:15

Pakistan Police	2–0	Social Welfare
Mohammad Naseem 45'; Yousaf 87'	Report

Maali Bagh, Quetta
14 March 2020
16:15

Insaf Afghan Goods	0–2	PACA
	Report	A Baseer 27'; Mohibullah 45+2'

Maali Bagh, Quetta
15 March 2020
16:15

Pakistan Police	0–0	Aqua Pure Water
	Report

Maali Bagh, Quetta
16 March 2020
16:15

Insaf Afghan Goods	0–2	Pakistan Police
	Report	M Hanif 17'; M Yousaf Ali 45'

Maali Bagh, Quetta

=== Group C ===
Pos	Team	Pld	W	D	L	GF	GA	GD	Pts
1	Masha United	2	2	0	0	3	0	+3	6
2	Pakistan Railways	2	1	0	1	3	3	0	3
3	Hazara Coal	1	0	0	1	0	2	-2	0
4	Atletico Academy Lahore	1	0	0	1	2	3	-1	0

13 March 2020
16:15

Pakistan Railways	3–2	Atletico Academy Lahore
Hamza 29'; Wajid Khan 59'; Adeel 70'	Report	Barkat Ali 78'; Zaheer Ahmad 82'

Faisalabad
26 September 2020
16:15

Masha United	2–0	Hazara Coal
Muhammad Zunair 21'; Hassan Raza

Faisalabad
2 October 2020
16:15

Masha United	1–0	Pakistan Railways
Musaddiq Afzal 69'	Report

Faisalabad
29 September 2020
16:15

Pakistan Railways	3–2	Hazara Coal
Muhammad Hamza 45'; Wajid Ali 49'; Ali Raza 57'	Report	Hussain 63'

Faisalabad

=== Final stage (Department) ===
Pos	Team	Pld	W	D	L	GF	GA	GD	Pts	Qualification
1	Masha United	5	3	2	0	8	1	7	11	Promotion to 2021 Pakistan Premier League
2	Karachi United	5	2	3	0	8	5	3	9	Promotion to 2021 Pakistan Premier League
3	Gwadar Port Authority (Note: Gwadar Port Authority were promoted on winning match against Pakistan Railways)	5	2	2	1	8	6	2	8	Promotion to 2021 Pakistan Premier League
4	Pakistan Railways	5	2	2	1	12	5	7	8	Stay in PFF League
6	Pakistan Police	5	1	0	4	5	16	-11	3	Stay in PFF League
5	PACA	5	0	1	4	1	9	-8	1	Stay in PFF League

7 October 2020
16:00

Masha United	3–0	Pakistan Police
Farrukh 13'; Zunair 45'; Ahtasham 68'	Report

Drigh Road Union Football Stadium, Karachi
8 October 2020
16:00

Karachi United	1–0	PACA
Amir 88'	Report

Drigh Road Union Football Stadium, Karachi
9 October 2020
16:00

Gwadar Port Authority	2–1	Pakistan Railways
Ishraq 78'; Shahnawaz 87'	Report	Nafees 17'

Drigh Road Union Football Stadium, Karachi
11 October 2020
16:00

Masha United	1–0	PACA
Farrukh 41'

Drigh Road Union Football Stadium, Karachi
12 October 2020
16:00

Pakistan Railways	2–2	Karachi United
Hamza (62'); Amir Hussain		Anees (59'); Amir

Drigh Road Union Football Stadium, Karachi
13 October 2020
16:00

Gwadar Port Authority	4–0	Pakistan Police
Pervez Kouda (9'); Naveed (52'); Wajid (78'); Shoib (87')	Report

Drigh Road Union Football Stadium, Karachi
15 October 2020
16:00

Karachi United	1–1	Masha United
Iqlas (11") (og)		Ihtisham (23')

Drigh Road Union Football Stadium, Karachi
16 October 2020
16:00

Gwadar Port Authority	1–1	PACA
Shahnawaz (52')		Kaleemullah (43')

Drigh Road Union Football Stadium, Karachi
17 October 2020
16:00

Pakistan Railways	6–1	Pakistan Police
Wajid Ali (28', 32'); Iftikhar (72'); Hamza (70', 81', 86')		Abdul Waheed (47')

Drigh Road Union Football Stadium, Karachi
19 October 2020
16:00

Gwadar Port Authority	0–3	Masha United
		Ahtasham Raza (31'); Farrukh Zia (71', 88')

Drigh Road Union Football Stadium, Karachi
20 October 2020
16:00

Karachi United	3–1	Pakistan Police
Anees (44', 66'); Amir (90')		Nabeel (82')

Drigh Road Union Football Stadium, Karachi
23 October 2020
16:00

Masha United	0–0	Pakistan Railways

Drigh Road Union Football Stadium, Karachi
25 October 2020
16:00

Karachi United	1–1	Gwadar Port Authority

Drigh Road Union Football Stadium, Karachi

== Club phase ==
Pos	Team	Pld	W	D	L	GF	GA	GD	Pts	Qualification
1	Baloch Quetta	5	4	0	0	17	3	14	15	Promotion to 2021 Pakistan Premier League
2	Humma	5	3	0	1	18	4	14	12	
3	Lyallpur	5	3	0	2	9	3	6	9	
4	Ittefaq	5	2	0	2	10	15	-5	6	
5	Wohaib	5	1	0	4	2	11	-10	3	
6	Jeay Laal	5	0	0	4	1	21	-20	0	

29 September 2020
16:00

Lyallpur	0–1	Baloch Quetta
	Report	Fateh Mohammad (66')

Lahore
1 October 2020
16:00

Jeay Laal	0–5	Humma
		Amar Iqbal (30', 70', 91'); Imran Khan (48'); Maazullah Shah (92')

Lahore
1 October 2020
16:00

Wohaib	1–4	Young Ittefaq
Abdullah (13')		Habibullah (5'); Sanaullah (26', 28', 79')

Lahore
4 October 2020
16:00

Wohaib	4–0	Baloch Quetta
Kamran (17', 79'); Naseebullah (29'); Fateh Mohammad (57')

Lahore
4 October 2020
16:00

Jeay Laal	0–4	Young Ittefaq
		Sanaullah (32', 75', 90'); Habib-ur-Rehman (54')

Lahore
5 October 2020
16:00

Humma	2–1	Lyallpur
Amir Iqbal (3'); Khaleeq-uz-Zaman (29')	Report	Sajid Mehmood (90')

Lahore
8 October 2020
15:00

Lyallpur	1–0	Wohaib
Rehan (40')	Report

Lahore
8 October 2020
15:00

Jeay Laal	1–7	Baloch Quetta
Fasih (43')	Report	Noor (16'); Fateh (22', 56'); Zahid (50', 60,' 70', 85')

Lahore
9 October 2020
15:00

Humma	6–1	Young Ittefaq
Khaleeq-uz-Zaman (10', 70', 88', 91'); Ijaz (61'); Ammar (78')	Report	Habib-ur-Rehman (56')

Lahore
11 October 2020
15:00

Baloch Quetta	5–1	Young Ittefaq
Muhammad Zahid (34', 46', 57'); Fateh Muhammad (42'); Naseebullah (55')		Sanaullah (18')

Lahore
11 October 2020
16:00

Lyallpur	4–0	Jeay Laal
Zubair (6'); Mehmood (31'); Junaid (81'); Zahid (88')

Lahore
12 October 2020
16:00

Humma	2–0	Wohaib
Ali Mahiwaan (50'); Ammar Iqbal (90')

Lahore
15 October 2020
11:00

Lyallpur	3–0	Young Ittefaq
Zubair (51'); Sagar (68'); Afza. (83')	Report

Punjab Stadium, Lahore
15 October 2020
13:00

Wohaib	1–0	Jeay Laal
	Report

Punjab Stadium, Lahore
15 October 2020
16:00

Baloch Quetta	2–1	Humma
Zahid (19', 86')		Mudassar (2')

Punjab Stadium, Lahore
