= Masha United =

Pakistani football club

- Full name: Masha United
- Nickname(s): United We Win
- Short name: MU
- Founded: 2019; 6 years ago
- President: Rana Muhammad Ashraf
- Head coach: Nasir Ismail
- League: Pakistan Premier League
- 2021–22: Withdrew

Masha United is a Pakistani professional football club based in Faisalabad, Punjab.

The men's team plays in the Pakistan Premier League, the top tier of Pakistani football and was promoted to PPL after winning the department phase of the 2020 PFF League.

The women's team plays in the National Women Football Championship, the top cup competition for women's football clubs in Pakistan, and made its debut in 2021.

Rai Ali Intikhab is the team owner, while Rana Muhammad Ashraf serves as the club president. Nasir Ismail is the head coach. The team is supported by the Shahid Afridi Foundation.

== History ==
Masha United was formed in 2019 when the Pakistan Football Federation announced the 2019 PFF National Challenge Cup in which Masha United would make its debut. However, Masha United could not participate in the event.

In February 2020, the 2020 PFF League was announced by Pakistan Football Federation and Masha United was in Group C along with Pakistan Railways, Atletico Madrid Lahore and Hazara Coal. On 14 March 2020, Masha United was to make its debut against Hazara Coal, but this was abandoned due to the CoVID-19 pandemic in Pakistan. After PFF League resumed, Masha United defeated Hazara Coal and Pakistan Railways to advance to the departmental final leg. In the departmental final leg, they were undefeated and were promoted to the 2021 Pakistan Premier League, the top tier of Pakistan Football Federation.

Nasir Ismail was announced as the head coach of Masha United for the 2021 Pakistan Premier League.

In December 2020, Masha United debuted in the PFF National Challenge Cup, the top cup of Pakistan football.

== Women's team ==
Masha United's women's team made its debut at the 13th National Women Football Championship held in Karachi in March 2021 as a last-minute entrant. To form a competitive team, it recruited four players from the 2021 Nepalese champions Armed Police Force (APF), which included the league's best player, Saru Limbu.

It finished top of its group, scoring 60 goals in four matches. It included a 19–0 win over Sialkot, a 4–0 triumph over Higher Education Commission, a 35–0 victory over Karachi, and a 2–2 draw with Karachi United. They reached the semifinals before the tournament was cancelled.

== Players ==
=== Current squad ===
As of 1 August 2023

Note: Flags indicate national team as defined under FIFA eligibility rules; some limited exceptions apply. Players may hold more than one non-FIFA nationality.

No.	Pos.	Nation	Player
—	GK	PAK	Abu Al Hassan
—	GK	PAK	Zeeshan Rasool
—	DF	PAK	Faisal Ghaffar
—	DF	PAK	Umer
—	DF	PAK	Shair Jahan
—	DF	PAK	Sabir Jan
—	DF	PAK	Omer Khan
—	DF	PAK	Abdul Rehman

No.	Pos.	Nation	Player
—	MF	PAK	Osama
—	MF	PAK	Jawad Javed
—	MF	PAK	Zeeshan Ali
—	FW	PAK	Shakir Lashari
—	FW	PAK	Fareed Ahmed
—	FW	PAK	Farukh Zia
—	FW	PAK	Aqib Javaid
—	FW	PAK	Muhammad Faizan
—	FW	PAK	Musadiq Afzal

== Competitive record ==
The club's competitive records since the 2020–21 season are listed below.

Season	Div	Tms	Pos	National Challenge Cup	AFC President's Cup	AFC Cup
2020–21	Football Federation League	6	1	Group Stage	DNP	DNP

== Notable players ==
The players below had senior international cap(s) for their respective countries. Players whose name is listed, represented their countries before or after playing for Masha United.

- (Pakistan) Shakir Lashari
- (Pakistan) Fareed Ullah
- (Pakistan) Moin Ahmed

== Honours ==
=== Domestic ===
- PFF League
  - Winners (1): 2020
