= Gwadar Port Authority FC =

Pakistani association football team

Gwadar Port Authority
- Full name: Gwadar Port Authority Football Club
- Short name: GPA F.C.

Gwadar Port Authority Football Club serves as the football section of the Gwadar Port Authority. The club regularly participates in the PFF National Challenge Cup.

== History ==
Gwadar Port Authority debuted in the 2011 PFF League, where they finished last in their group. They continued in the 2012 PFF League where they came second in their group.

In 2020, the team began facing internal instability and financial problems. However in the 2020 PFF League, they were second in their group and qualified for the final stage. They defeated Pakistan Police in their second match of the final stage. Gwadar Port Authority ended up in the third place on the group points table and gained promotion to the eventually cancelled 2021–22 Pakistan Premier League. However, they did not compete in the league due to personal decision.

Following the return of domestic football in the country in 2023, the team withdrew from the 2023–24 National Football Challenge Cup due to internal instability. The team again withdrew from the 2026 National Challenge Cup. In mid 2026, the team however remained active in local football tournaments.
