= Jeay Laal FC =

Pakistani football club

Jeay Laal
- Full name: Jeay Laal Football Club
- Short name: JLFC
- League: PFF League
Home colours	Away colours

Jeay Laal also known as Jeay Laal Thatta is a Pakistani football club based in Thatta, Sindh. The team plays in the PFF League, the second tier of Pakistan Football.

== History ==
On 4 March 2020, the Sindh Normalization Committee organized the preliminary round for the 2020 PFF League Club Leg from 9 March. Six teams were announced, including Jeay Laal. Jeay Laal won the final and qualified for the 2020 PFF League Club Leg scheduled to begin from 23 March, but it was postponed due to the coronavirus outbreak in Pakistan.

After the league was restarted, Jeay Laal made its debut against Huma F.C. where they conceded a loss. They lost all their matches in the tournament.

== Competitive record ==
The club's competitive records since the 2020–21 season are listed below.

Season	Div	Tms	Pos	National Challenge Cup	AFC President's Cup	AFC Cup
2020–21	PFF League	19	Group stage	DNP	DNP	DNP
