= Social Welfare FT =

Pakistani football club

Social Welfare
- Full name: Social Welfare Football Team
- Short name: SWFT

Social Welfare is a Pakistani departmental football team.

== History ==
Social Welfare was defeated 4–1 on debut against Sui Southern Gas. In the 2014-15 PFF League, they ended at the bottom of the table. In 2020-21 PFF League, they were in Group B.
