= Karachi United FC =

Pakistani football club

Karachi United
- Full name: Karachi United Football Club
- Short name: KUFC
- Founded: 1996; 30 years ago
- Ground: Karachi United Stadium
- Capacity: 2,000
- Coordinates: 24°48′51.3″N 67°00′05.5″E
- Owner & Chairman: Taha Alizai
- Head Coach: Shaikh Hamdan
- League: Pakistan Premier League
- Website: karachiunited.com
Home colours	Away colours

Karachi United Football Club is a Pakistani professional football club based in Clifton, Karachi. It last competed in the Pakistan Premier League, the top tier of the Pakistani football league system. Karachi United uses the 2,000-capacity Karachi United Stadium for most of their home games.

Formed in 1996, the club turned professional in 2013, making their national league debut in second tier 2013 PFF League. The club also competed in the 2016 PFF Cup, the highest cup competition in Pakistan that year. In October 2020, the club was promoted to the Pakistan Premier League for the first time, courtesy of a second-place finish in the 2020 PFF League. It therefore made its top-flight debut in the 2021 Pakistan Premier League.

== History ==
=== Founding and early years (1996–2012) ===
Karachi United was founded in 1996 by Taha Alizai, aiming to promote grassroots football in Pakistan. The club started its youth academy in 2001.

In 2003 the club launched the citywide KASB League, which quickly became a consistent open club competition in Karachi, and a counterweight to departmental dominance in the national top tier. The team regularly played there.

Karachi United also launched their women team in 2010.

=== Professionalisation and promotion (2013–2021) ===
In 2013, Karachi United launched their professional team to compete in Pakistan's second tier PFF League. Registering as a department, they made their debut in the departmental phase of the 2013 PFF League. They ended first in the group and advanced to the final phase where they finished last.

In 2014, the club participated in the departmental phase of the 2014 PFF League. They finished bottom of group C, failing to win either of their two matches. The club acquired its own stadium in 2015.

Karachi United team that won promotion.

Head Coach - Kareem Kerai. Asst. Coach - Shaikh Hamdan.

The club competed in the 2016 PFF Cup, the highest cup competition in Pakistan at the time. After getting through the qualifying and group stage, they lost to Pakistan Air Force in the quarter-finals. In the 2018 and 2019 National Football Challenge Cup, they failed to get past the group stage.

At the 2020 National Football Challenge Cup, the team lost to eventual champions WAPDA in the quarter finals. Later on in the 2020 PFF League, Karachi United finished at the top of group A and advanced to the final phase, where they finished second, and thus after a struggle of many years, were finally promoted to the Pakistan Premier League.

=== 2021–present ===
It therefore made its top-flight debut in the 2021 Pakistan Premier League. However during a turmoil within the Pakistan Football Federation, the league not being recognised by FIFA, and organised by a faction who came to power after forcibly taking control of the PFF office, the league was suspended after a few months into the season and then cancelled.

== Crest and colours ==
=== Crest ===
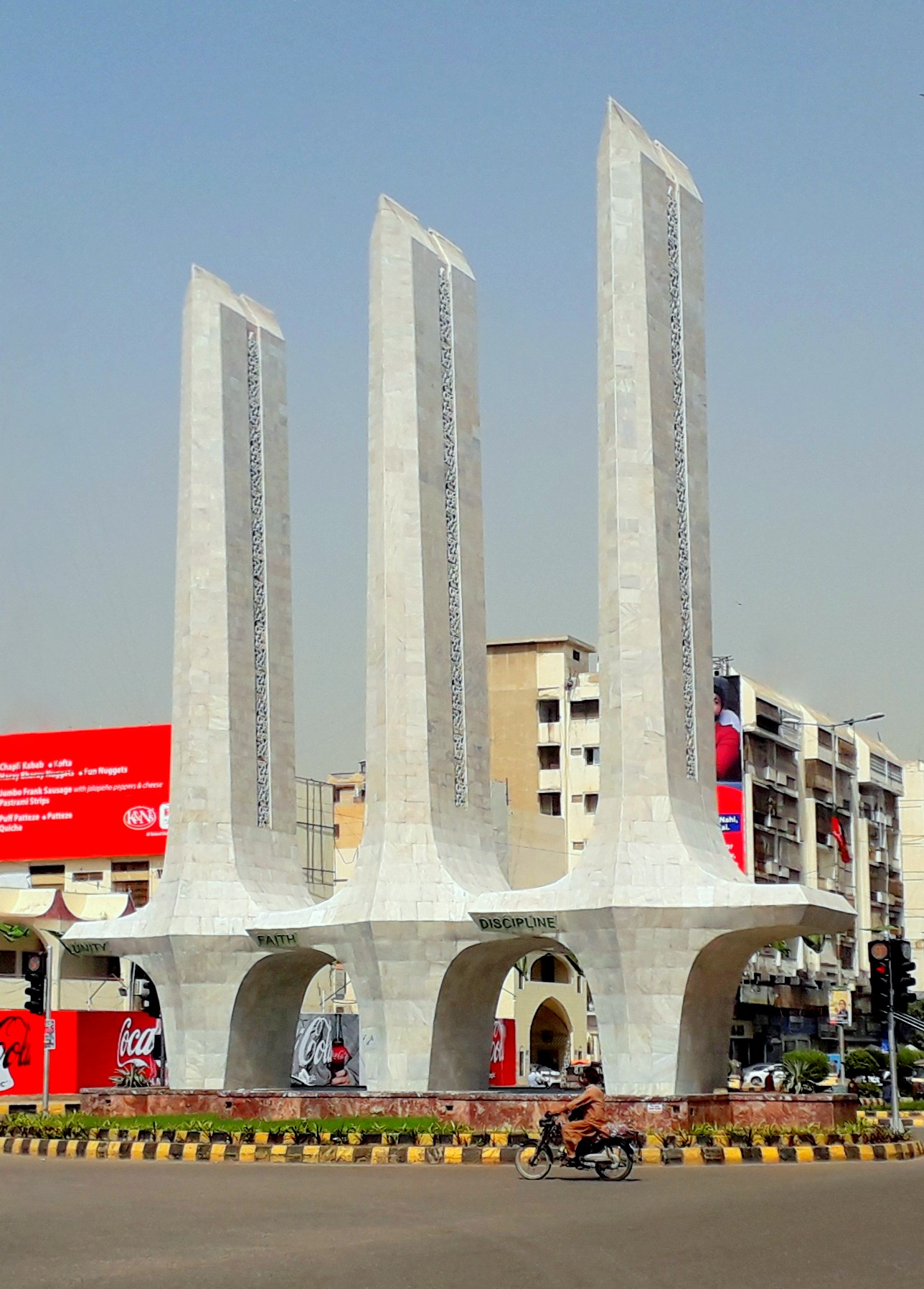
The Teen Talwar monument in Clifton is featured on the club crest

The club's crest represents Teen Talwar on their logo, one of the most popular monuments in the city of Karachi, which represent Unity, Faith and Discipline.

=== Colours ===
Karachi United's colours are red, white and black. Traditionally, the club has used red as the home colour and black, white, or green as the away colour.

=== Kit manufacturers and shirt sponsors ===
Period	Kit manufacturer	Main Shirt Sponsor	Sleeve Sponsor
2021–2024	M. I. Industries	Engro Corporation	-
2025–present	M. I. Industries	-	Coach360

== Stadium ==
The Karachi United Stadium in the DHA neighborhood of Clifton, Karachi, serves as the home ground of Karachi United.

Karachi United first used the DHA Football Stadium, also named Rahat Football Stadium, in Khayaban-e-Rahat, DHA, as their home ground. The team later started training in a renovated residential park in Clifton, which the club rented on a more permanent basis, and acquired the Karachi United Stadium in 2015. By 2017, the Karachi United Stadium in Clifton started featuring regular youth fixtures.

== Reserves and academy ==
Karachi United started its youth academy in 2001. This was followed by the launch of Karachi United School Championship in 2005, becoming a notable annual schools and colleges football tournament throughout Karachi. The club initiated its youth summer camp in 2009, and the next year it launched community program.

=== International tours ===
==== Manchester United tour (2004) ====
In July 2004, Karachi United became the first team from Pakistan to visit one of the premier football clubs of the world when its 14-member under-15 youth academy team went on a week-long tour to the Manchester United Soccer Schools (MUSS) in Manchester, a trip sponsored by ABN Amro. The team was coached by a Manchester United coach for a week, and also played three matches against local opposition. The team also visited the Manchester United first team training at their facility at Carrington, where it spent time in the company of manager Alex Ferguson, assistant manager Carlos Queiroz, and players including Roy Keane, Alan Smith, and Rio Ferdinand.

==== Charlton Athletic academy call-ups (2006) ====
In July 2006, two youth academy players Atif Sachak and Kareem Kerai, were selected for a pre-season two-week academy and community programmes at Premier League club's Charlton Athletic youth academy. A few days later, both the players were drafted into Charlton's under-13 side for a match against a visiting American club.

==== Qatar tours ====
===== 2008 =====
In September 2008, the youth team was invited to Qatar on a week-long tour to play matches against the youth teams of Al-Ahli and Al Sadd, as well as train at the Aspire Academy for Sports Excellence.

===== 2011 =====
In September 2011, it was invited again to Qatar on a five-day tour to train and play matches versus Aspire Academy, Al Sadd and other local clubs.

===== 2019 =====
The academy team was invited to play a four-match bilateral series against Aspire Academy in Doha in March 2019. The under-12 side managed to win all four matches in the series. The under-11 team won and lost twice.

In November 2019, KU U-12 and U-11 categories were again invited by the Aspire Academy to participate in a tri-series football tournament.

===== 2023 =====
In March 2023, KU was once again invited by the Aspire Academy to Doha for a 5-day tour to participate in a 3-match friendly series between the U-11 and U-12 teams.

The academy squad was invited in October 2023 to play a couple of competitive matches and a friendly match with Aspire Academy.

==== Barcelona tour (2017) ====
In February 2017, Karachi United became the first Pakistani club to tour FC Barcelona. During their week long tour, the Karachi United squad, comprising 53 people (44 players and 9 officials), was given six coaching sessions by coaches from FCB. The squad was housed at the Marcet Fundacion, a Catalonian youth set-up. During their stay, Karachi United's four teams (two under-13 teams, with one of the teams comprising both boys and girls, and two under-16) played over 15 matches against local opposition. The squad also visited La Masia, FCB Museum and Camp Nou.

== Partnerships and affiliations ==
In July 2024, Karachi United formed a partnership with English club Swindon Town. This collaboration was facilitated by Prospect Pakistan, a sports platform. The memorandum of understanding was signed at the Royal Agricultural University in the UK, with key figures from both clubs present. Key components of the partnership include coaching development, player pathways through exchange programs, scouting and training camps, and regular exchanges between the clubs on club management, player development, and community engagement.

== Community work ==
Since 2010, Karachi United has worked with Generation Amazing, a Qatar 2022 World Cup community programme. The partnership built a full-size turf pitch at the club's ground in Karachi and encouraged more girls to play football through youth ambassadors from Lyari.

By 2019 the club was operating 11 community centres across Karachi, serving over 1,000 children, including around 200 girls, staffed by a large cohort of community and academy coaches.

The club has community centers in the following areas in Lyari, Malir, Ibrahim Hyderi, Muaripur, Mangophir, Orangi Town, Baldia Town, Shireen Jinnah, and Old Golimar.

== Players ==
=== Current squad ===
As of 1 April 2026

Note: Flags indicate national team as defined under FIFA eligibility rules; some limited exceptions apply. Players may hold more than one non-FIFA nationality.

No.	Pos.	Nation	Player
1	GK	PAK	Akhtar Baloch
3	DF	PAK	Mohib Ullah (captain)
6	MF	PAK	Ali Muhammad
7	FW	PAK	Zain ul Abideen
12	DF	PAK	Sheriyar Baloch
15	MF	PAK	Adeel Hanif
17	MF	PAK	Muhammad Afridi
19	FW	PAK	Sahil Shafi
24	MF	PAK	Tufail Shinwari

No.	Pos.	Nation	Player
25	MF	PAK	Affan Siddiqui (vice-captain)
29	FW	PAK	Faizan Jan
31	DF	PAK	Mohsin Abdul Rasheed
43	GK	PAK	Chaudhry Hammas
54	DF	PAK	Abbas Ali
56	DF	PAK	Fahad Aalyani
63	MF	PAK	Ali Imran Anwar
64	FW	PAK	Sameer Abdul Sattar
66	DF	PAK	Muneer Khan (vice-captain)

== Personnel ==
=== Current technical staff ===
Position	Name
Head Coach	(Pakistan) Shaikh Hamdan
Assistant Coach	(Pakistan) Daniyal Naeem
Goalkeeper Coach	(Pakistan) Meer Sohrab
Academy Coach	(Pakistan) Najeeb Ullah
S&C Coach & Physical Therapist	(Pakistan) Meekail Asim
Commercial Manager	(Pakistan) Ahmed Khan
Media and Communications	(Pakistan) Mohammad Hassan
Graphic Designer	(Pakistan) Jarri Abbas
Official Photographer	(Pakistan) Mohammad Sameer
Director of Football Operations	(Pakistan) Taha Alizai
Director of Youth and Academy	(Pakistan) Imran Ali
Director of Football Development	(Pakistan) Ali Ata
General Secretary	(Pakistan) Talib Hussain

== Coaching history ==
- (Pakistan) Taha Alizai (1996–2012)
- (Pakistan) Adeel Rizki (2013–2016)
- (Pakistan) Unknown (2017–2019)
- (Pakistan) Kareem Kerai (2020)
- (Pakistan) Shaikh Hamdan (2021–present)

== Competitive record ==
Season	Division	League								National Challenge Cup	Asian club competition
Season	Division	P	W	D	L	GF	GA	Pts	Pos.	National Challenge Cup	Asian club competition
2013	PFF League	2	0	0	2	0	3	0	Group stage	DNE	DNQ
2014	PFF League	6	1	3	2	6	11	6	Group stage	DNE	DNQ
2016	NH									Quarterfinals	DNQ
2018	NH									Group stage	DNQ
2019	NH									Group stage	DNQ
2020	PFF League	7	4	3	0	12	5	15	2nd	Round of 16	DNQ

Key

Winners
Runners-up
3rd place
Relegated

- Pld = Played
- W = Games won
- D = Games drawn
- L = Games lost
- GF = Goals for
- GA = Goals against
- Pts = Points
- Pos. = Final position
- DNQ = Did not qualify
- DNE = Did not enter
- NH = Not held
- – = Did not exist/Unknown

== Honours ==
League

- PFF League
  - Runners-up: 2020

== Competitions ==
Karachi United runs several competitions:

- Karachi United School Championship
- Standard Chartered Karachi United Youth Football League
- Corporate Futsal League
- Ramzan Futsal Cup
- Karachi Football League
- Open Youth Tournament
