= 2025–26 East Bengal FC Women season =

2025–26 football season for East Bengal FC Women

East Bengal Women
2025–26 season
- Owner: Emami East Bengal Football Club Pvt. Ltd.
- Head coach: Anthony Andrews
- Stadium: East Bengal Ground
- Indian Women's League: Winners
- Calcutta Football League: to be decided
- AFC Champions League: Group stage
- SAFF Club Championship: Winners
- Top goalscorer: League: Fazila Ikwaput (20 goals); All: Fazila Ikwaput (31 goals)
- Biggest win: East Bengal 21–0 Dipti Sangha; 2 April 2026, CWF League
- Biggest defeat: East Bengal 0–3 Nasaf; 23 November 2025, AWCL
Home colours	Away colours	Third colours

The 2025–26 season is the 7th season in the history of East Bengal Women. The team would compete in the Indian Women's League and the Calcutta Women's Football League and also, would participate in the 2025–26 AFC Women's Champions League and 2025 SAFF Women's Club Championship after being champions of the 2024–25 Indian Women's League.

== Background ==
East Bengal Women's team won their inaugural Indian Women's League in the 2024–25 season and qualified for the 2025–26 AFC Women's Champions League and inaugural 2025 SAFF Women's Club Championship. East Bengal extended the contracts of fourteen players for the season – Goalkeepers: Panthoi Chanu, Mamani Das, Defenders: Sarita Yumnam, Sathi Debnath, Supriya Kispotta, Riya Sarkar, Midfielders: Karthika Angamuthu, Sandhiya Ranganathan, Sangita Basfore, Thandamoni Baskey, Forwards: Soumya Guguloth, Sulanjana Raul, Sandhya Maity, Resty Nanziri. The club also roped in the Golden Boot winner of the 2024–25 Indian Women's League, Ugandan national team striker Fazila Ikwaput for the season, along with Indian national team players: Shilky Devi Hemam and Payal Basude.

== Current squad ==
As of 1 August 2025

Note: Flags indicate national team as defined under FIFA eligibility rules; some limited exceptions apply. Players may hold more than one non-FIFA nationality.

No.	Pos.	Nation	Player
1	GK	IND	Panthoi Chanu Elangbam
2	DF	IND	Sweety Devi Ngangbam (captain)
3	MF	IND	Riya Sarkar
4	DF	IND	Ashalata Devi Loitongbam
5	DF	IND	Astam Oraon
6	DF	IND	Sarita Yumnam
7	MF	IND	Soumya Guguloth
8	MF	IND	Sangita Basfore
9	FW	IND	Anju Tamang
10	FW	UGA	Fazila Ikwaput
11	MF	IND	Priyangka Devi Naorem
12	FW	IND	Sandhiya Ranganathan
14	MF	IND	Karthika Angamuthu
15	MF	IND	Sushmita Bardhan
16	FW	UGA	Resty Nanziri
17	MF	IND	Sathi Debnath
18	MF	IND	Thandamoni Baskey

No.	Pos.	Nation	Player
19	DF	IND	Shilky Devi Hemam
21	DF	GHA	Abena Anoma Opoku
22	FW	IND	Sulanjana Raul
23	FW	IND	Titli Sarkar
26	FW	IND	Priyanka Sujeesh
27	MF	IND	Cindy Remruatpuii Colney
30	MF	IND	Deblina Bhattacharjee
34	FW	IND	Sandhya Maity
41	GK	IND	Buli Sarkar
62	MF	IND	Sushmita Lepcha
77	MF	IND	Sonali Chemate
—	DF	IND	Supriya Kispotta
—	GK	IND	Melody Chanu Keisham
—	GK	IND	Payal Basude

== Competitions ==
=== Overall record ===
Competition	First match	Last match	Starting round	Final position	Record							
Competition	First match	Last match	Starting round	Final position	Pld	W	D	L	GF	GA	GD	Win %
AFC Women's Champions League	25 August 2025	20 November 2025	Preliminary round	Group stage	5	2	1	2	5	7	−2	40.00
Indian Women's League	24 December 2025	18 May 2026	League stage	Winner	13	12	0	1	47	5	+42	92.31
Calcutta Women's Football League	23 March 2026	21 May 2026	Group stage	Winner	11	11	0	0	96	2	+94	100.00
SAFF Club Women's Championship	8 December 2025	20 December 2025	Group Stage	Winner	5	4	1	0	16	0	+16	80.00
Total					34	29	2	3	164	14	+150	85.29

Last updated: 21 May 2026
Source: Soccerway

=== AFC Women's Champions League ===
East Bengal qualified for the 2025–26 AFC Women's Champions League after being the champions of the 2024–25 Indian Women's League. East Bengal was grouped into group E of the Preliminary round alongside Kitchee of Hong Kong and Phnom Penh Crown of Cambodia, with all the matches of the group set to be played at the RSN Stadium in Phnom Penh, Cambodia. East Bengal roped in 4 new foreigners ahead of the tournament along with Resty Nanziri who was retained from the last season – compatriots Fazila Ikwaput and Amnah Nababi from Uganda, and defenders: Abena Anoma Opoku from Ghana and Maureen Tovia Okpala from Nigeria. In the opening match against Phnom Penh Crown on 25 August, East Bengal won 1–0 to begin the campaign with Fazila Ikwaput scoring the only goal of the match. On 31 August, East Bengal faced Kitchee and drew 1–1 and topped the group and secured a qualification for the group stages of the AFC Women's Champions League.

==== Preliminary Round ====
Pos	Team	Pld	W	D	L	GF	GA	GD	Pts	Qualification
1	(India) East Bengal	2	1	1	0	2	1	+1	4	Advance to group stage
2	(Hong Kong) Kitchee	2	0	2	0	4	4	0	2	
3	(Cambodia) Phnom Penh Crown (H)	2	0	1	1	3	4	−1	1	

Source: AFC
Rules for classification: Tiebreakers
(H) Hosts

===== Matches =====
Win Draw Loss Void

25 August 2025 Preliminary Round	Phnom Penh Crown (Cambodia)	0–1	(India) East Bengal	Phnom Penh, Cambodia
19:00 UTC+7 (17:30 IST)		Report	Ikwaput 70'	Stadium: National Sports Complex; Attendance: 786; Referee: Oh Hyeon-jeong (South Korea)

31 August 2025 Preliminary Stage	East Bengal (India)	1–1	(Hong Kong) Kitchee	Phnom Penh, Cambodia
19:00 UTC+7 (17:30 IST)	Basfore 11'	Report	Mei 59'	Stadium: National Sports Complex; Attendance: 253; Referee: Haruna Kanematsu (Japan)

==== Group stage ====
East Bengal was grouped into Group-B alongside hosts Wuhan Jiangda of China, Bam Khatoon from Iran and Nasaf from Uzbekistan, with all the matches to be played at the Hankou Cultural Sports Centre in Wuhan, China. On 17 November 2025, East Bengal faced Bam Khatoon in the opening match of the group stage and won 3–1 with goals from Shilky Devi Hemam, Fazila Ikwaput and Resty Nanziri to register their first ever win in the AWCL group stages.

Pos	Team	Pld	W	D	L	GF	GA	GD	Pts	Qualification
1	(China) Wuhan Jiangda (H)	3	2	1	0	7	1	+6	7	Advance to knockout stage
2	(Uzbekistan) Nasaf	3	1	1	1	4	2	+2	4	Advance to knockout stage
3	(India) East Bengal	3	1	0	2	3	6	−3	3	
4	(Iran) Bam Khatoon	3	1	0	2	2	7	−5	3	

Source: AFC
Rules for classification: Tiebreakers
(H) Hosts

===== Matches =====
Win Draw Loss Void

17 November 2025 MD1	Bam Khatoon (Iran)	1–3	(India) East Bengal	Wuhan, China
15:00 UTC+8 (13:30 IST)	Hamoudi 45+8' (pen.)	Report	Hemam 4'; Ikwaput 32'; Nanziri 87'	Stadium: Hankou Cultural Sports Centre; Attendance: 268; Referee: Casey Reibelt (Australia)

20 November 2025 MD2	(India) East Bengal	0–2	(China) Wuhan Jiangda	Wuhan, China
15:00 UTC+8 (13:30 IST)		Report	Wang Shuang 8', 17' (pen.)	Stadium: Hankou Cultural Sports Centre; Attendance: 625; Referee: Kim Yu-jeong (South Korea)

23 November 2025 MD3	(India) East Bengal	0–3	(Uzbekistan) Nasaf	Wuhan, China
15:00 UTC+8 (13:30 IST)		Report	Khabibullaeva 18', 90+8'; Norboeva 52'	Stadium: Hankou Cultural Sports Centre; Attendance: 354; Referee: Yoshimi Yamashita (Japan)

=== SAFF Club Women's Championship ===
East Bengal participated in the inaugural SAFF Club Women's Championship as the sole representative from India after becoming champions of the 2024–25 Indian Women's League. The tournament consists of teams from hosts Nepal, Bangladesh, Pakistan and Bhutan, alongside East Bengal with all the matches to be played at the Dasharath Rangasala in Kathmandu. On 8 December, East Bengal debuted in the tournament with a 4–0 victory over Transport United of Bhutan with Fazila Ikwaput scoring a brace and Sulanjana Raul and Resty Nanziri scoring the rest. East Bengal continued their winning run in the second match with a 2–0 victory over Karachi City with Sulanjana Raul and Resty Nanziri scoring again for East Bengal. In the third match, East Bengal thrashed Nasrin of Bangladesh 7–0 with Fazila Ikwaput scoring five goals herself, and the rest two scored by Jyoti Chouhan and Sulanjana Raul, as East Bengal qualified for the final of the tournament with a game to spare. On 17 December, East Bengal played out a goalless draw in the last match of the league phase against APF of Nepal in a regulation match as both teams already qualified for the final. On 20 December 2025, East Bengal created history to become the first Indian women's football team to win an international tournament as they defeated APF of Nepal 3–0 in the final with Fazila Ikwaput scoring a brace and Shilky Devi Hemam scoring the other, as East Bengal became the inaugural champions of the SAFF Club Women's Championship.

==== Group stage ====
Pos	Team	Pld	W	D	L	GF	GA	GD	Pts	Qualification	(India) EAB	(Nepal) APF	(Bhutan) TRU	(Pakistan) KAC	(Bangladesh) NAS
1	(India) East Bengal (C)	4	3	1	0	13	0	+13	10	Advance to final		0–0		2–0	
2	(Nepal) APF (H)	4	2	2	0	5	0	+5	8	Advance to final			0–0	1–0	
3	(Bhutan) Transport United	4	0	3	1	1	5	−4	3		0–4				1–1
4	(Pakistan) Karachi City	4	0	2	2	0	3	−3	2				0–0		0–0
5	(Bangladesh) Nasrin	4	0	2	2	1	12	−11	2		0–7	0–4			

Source: SAFF
Legend: Blue = home team win; Yellow = draw; Red = away team win.
Rules for classification: Qualification tiebreakers
(C) Champions; (H) Hosts

===== Matches =====
8 December 2025 Group stage	Transport (Bhutan)	0–4	(India) East Bengal	Kathmandu, Nepal
14:00 UTC+5:45 (13:45 IST)		Report	Ikwaput 36', 72'; Raul 60'; Nanziri 63'	Stadium: Dasharath Rangasala; Attendance: 125; Referee: Zin Mar Oo (Myanmar); Man of the Match: Fazila Ikwaput (East Bengal)

11 December 2025 Group stage	East Bengal (India)	2–0	(Pakistan) Karachi City	Kathmandu, Nepal
14:00 UTC+5:45 (13:45 IST)	Raul 5'; Nanziri 49'	Report		Stadium: Dasharath Rangasala; Attendance: 305; Referee: Anjana Rai (Nepal); Man of the Match: Sulanjana Raul (East Bengal)

14 December 2025 Group stage	Nasrin (Bangladesh)	0–7	(India) East Bengal	Kathmandu, Nepal
18:00 UTC+5:45 (17:45 IST)		Report	Ikwaput 7', 26', 45', 74', 90'; Chouhan 45+1'; Raul 73'	Stadium: Dasharath Rangasala; Attendance: 299; Referee: Keomany Phengmeuagkhoun (Laos); Man of the Match: Fazila Ikwaput (East Bengal)

17 December 2025 Group stage	East Bengal (India)	0–0	(Nepal) APF	Kathmandu, Nepal
18:00 UTC+5:45 (17:45 IST)		Report		Stadium: Dasharath Rangasala; Attendance: 8,323; Referee: Yapa A. Pabasara Minisarani (Sri Lanka); Man of the Match: Anjana Rana Magar (APF)

Final match

20 December 2025 Final	East Bengal (India)	3–0	(Nepal) APF	Kathmandu, Nepal
17:00 UTC+5:45 (16:45 IST)	Ikwaput 46', 22'; Hemam 35'	Report		Stadium: Dasharath Rangasala; Attendance: 8,253; Referee: Keomany Phengmeuagkhoun (Laos); Man of the Match: Shilky Devi Hemam (East Bengal)

=== Indian Women's League ===
East Bengal is the defending champions of the Indian Women's League.

==== League table ====
Pos	Team	Pld	W	D	L	GF	GA	GD	Pts	Qualification or relegation
1	East Bengal (C)	14	13	0	1	47	5	+42	39	Qualification for AFC Champions League
2	Sethu	14	7	4	3	26	14	+12	25	
3	Kickstart	14	6	3	5	17	21	−4	21	
4	Nita	14	5	5	4	26	23	+3	20	
5	Gokulam Kerala	14	4	6	4	16	16	0	18	

Source: IFL
Rules for classification: 1) points; 2) head-to-head points; 3) head-to-head goal difference; 4) goal difference; 5) number of goals scored; 6)drawing of lots
(C) Champions

==== Results by match ====
Match	1	2	3	4	5	6	7	8	9	10	11	12	13	14
Ground	A	H	H	A	A	A	H	H	H	H	A	H	A	A
Result	W	W	W	W	W	W	W	W	W	L	W	W	W	W
Position	4	4	2	1	1	1	1	1	1	1	1	1	1	1

Updated to match(es) played on 18 May 2026. Source: I-League
A = Away; H = Home; W = Win; D = Draw; L = Loss

===== Matches =====
Win Draw Loss Void

24 December 2025 2	Sethu	0–1	East Bengal	Kalyani
14:30		I-League; PDF Report	Guguloth 77'	Stadium: Kalyani Stadium; Attendance: 100; Referee: Sen Hangma Subba; Player of the Match: Soumya Guguloth (East Bengal)

27 December 2025 3	East Bengal	2–1	Garhwal United	Kalyani
14:30	Raul 22'; Ikwaput 63'	I-League; PDF Report	Singha 72'	Stadium: Kalyani Stadium; Attendance: 100; Referee: Ranjita Devi Tekcham; Player of the Match: Astam Oraon (East Bengal)

30 December 2025 4	East Bengal	9–0	Sesa	Kalyani
15:00	Guguloth 6', 54', 86'; Ikwaput 9', 22', 25', 72'; Raul 18'; Nanziri 40'	I-League; PDF Report		Stadium: Kalyani Stadium; Attendance: 300; Referee: Bishnupriya Das; Player of the Match: Soumya Guguloth (East Bengal)

2 January 2026 5	Nita	0–5	East Bengal	Kalyani
15:00		I-League; PDF Report	Raul 6'; Guguloth 42'; Nanziri 51'; Ikwaput 63'; Naorem 89'	Stadium: Kalyani Stadium; Attendance: 350; Referee: Ranjita Devi Tekcham; Player of the Match: Resty Nanziri (East Bengal)

6 January 2026 6	Kickstart	0–5	East Bengal	Kalyani
15:00		I-League; PDF Report	Ikwaput 15', 73'; Nanziri 45+2'; Raul 60'; Oraon 62'	Stadium: Kalyani Stadium; Attendance: 450; Referee: Sen Hangma Subba; Player of the Match: Fazila Ikwaput (East Bengal)

9 January 2026 7	Gokulam Kerala	0–3	East Bengal	Kalyani
15:00		I-League; PDF Report	Ikwaput 36'; Nanziri 55'; Raul 76'	Stadium: Kalyani Stadium; Attendance: 300; Referee: Ranjita Devi Tekcham; Player of the Match: Shilky Devi Hemam (East Bengal)

27 April 2026 1	East Bengal	3–1	Sribhumi	Kolkata
16:00	Ikwaput 37', 46', 60'	IFL; Report	Haldar 80'; Yumnam Kamala Devi (yellow card) 86'	Stadium: East Bengal Ground; Attendance: 300; Referee: Ranjita Devi Tekcham; Player of the Match: Fazila Ikwaput (East Bengal)

30 April 2026 8	East Bengal	1–0	Sethu	Kolkata
15:00	Ikwaput 64'	IFL; Report	Doreen Graham (yellow card) 84'	Stadium: East Bengal Ground; Attendance: 100; Referee: Bishnupriya Das; Player of the Match: Malavika Prasad (Sethu)

3 May 2026 9	East Bengal	2–1	Gokulam Kerala	Kolkata
19:30	Ikwaput 6', 65'; Shilky (yellow card) 15' (yellow-red card) 80'; Resty Nanziri (yellow card) 90+2'	IFL; Report	Emueje Ogbiagbevha (yellow card) 15'; Shubhangi Singh 70'; Chingakham Alina (yellow card) 77'	Stadium: East Bengal Ground; Attendance: 100; Referee: Ruba Devi G. Player of the Match: Fazila Ikwaput (East Bengal)

6 May 2026 10	East Bengal	1–2	Kickstart	Kolkata
19:30	Ikwaput 7'	IFL; Report	Essien 16'; Babysana Devi Thingbaijam 58'	Stadium: East Bengal Ground; Attendance: 100; Referee: Rachana Hasmukh Kamani; Player of the Match: Sandhya Maity (East Bengal)

9 May 2026 11	Sesa	0–6	East Bengal	Kolkata
20:00	Angamuthu 14', 28'; Guguloth 45+1'; Lepcha 45+4'; Ikwaput 70'; Nanziri 87'	IFL; Report		Stadium: East Bengal Ground; Attendance: 100; Referee: Bishnupriya Das; Player of the Match: Karthika Angamuthu (East Bengal)

12 May 2026 12	East Bengal	2–0	Nita	Kolkata
19:30	Guguloth 25', 65'	IFL; Report		Stadium: East Bengal Ground; Attendance: 50; Referee: Pooja S. Player of the Match: Soumya Guguloth (East Bengal)

15 May 2026 13	Garhwal United	0–5	East Bengal	Kolkata
19:30		IFL; Report	Guguloth 13', 63'; Naorem 28'; Ikwaput 71', 73'	Stadium: East Bengal Ground; Attendance: 100; Referee: Ruba Devi G. Player of the Match: Soumya Guguloth (East Bengal)

18 May 2026 14	Sribhumi	0–2	East Bengal	Kolkata
19:30		IFL; Report	Ikwaput 41' (pen.); Raul 55'	Stadium: East Bengal Ground; Attendance: 350; Referee: Neetu Rana; Player of the Match: Fazila Ikwaput (East Bengal)

=== Calcutta Women's Football League ===
East Bengal is the defending champions of the Kanyashree Cup and were grouped in Group B for the first phase of the tournament. They started their campaign on 23 March 2026 against Moitree Sansad with a 12–0 win. East Bengal defeated rivals Sribhumi 2–1 in the second match. On 2 April, East Bengal recorded a 21–0 victory over Dipti Sangha, the second biggest victory in the history of the club, only after a 35–0 victory over Behala Aikya Sammilani from the 2022–23 season. On 20 April, East Bengal defeated United Kolkata 2–0 to become the champions of group B and enter the championship round.

==== League Table ====
Pos	Team	Pld	W	D	L	GF	GA	GD	Pts	Qualification	EBFC	UKSC	SBFC	WBPS	KSLA	DPSG	MOSS	CDSC
1	East Bengal	7	7	0	0	54	1	+53	21	Advanced to Championship round	—		2–1			21–0	12–0	3–0*
2	United Kolkata SC	7	6	0	1	55	2	+53	18	Advanced to Championship round	0–2	—	1–0	6–0	9–0	13–0	17–0	9–0
3	Sribhumi	7	5	0	2	26	5	+21	15	Advanced to Championship round			—		4–1		10–0	2–0
4	WB Police Club	7	4	0	3	18	17	+1	12	Advanced to Championship round	0–6		0–2	—		7–2		
5	Kalighat Sports Lovers Association	7	3	0	4	9	28	−19	9		0–8			0–3	—			2–0
6	Dipti Sangha	7	1	1	5	8	52	−44	4				1–7		2–3	—	1–1	
7	Moitree Sansad	7	0	2	5	4	47	−43	2					0–3	2–3		—	1–1
8	Chandney SC	7	0	1	6	2	24	−22	1					1–5		0–2		—

Source: The Away End

Pos	Team	Pld	W	D	L	GF	GA	GD	Pts	Qualification	EBFC	UKSC	WBPS	SBFC	POAC	SSBW	JMAC	NASS
1	East Bengal	4	4	0	0	42	1	+41	12	Champions	—							
2	United Kolkata SC	4	4	0	0	15	0	+15	12	Eligible for IWL2 (Note: If the top teams are already playing in national leagues, then the next highest ranked team(s) would be eligible for IWL2.)		—						
3	WB Police Club	4	2	1	1	10	3	+7	7				—					
4	Sribhumi	4	2	0	2	9	8	+1	6					—				

Source: The Away End

===== Matches =====
Win Draw Loss Void

23 March 2026 1	East Bengal	12–0	Moitree Sansad	Kolkata
14:30	Birsi Oraon 6'; Sarita Yumnam 14'; Naorem Priyangka Devi 17'; Shrabani Murmu 25', 45', 83'; Fulmani Kharia 35'; Sathi Debnath 40', 86'; Purnima Das 60'; Antasia Oraon 75', 85'	Report		Stadium: East Bengal Ground; Attendance: 75; Referee: Sasthi Moni Saren

26 March 2026 2	East Bengal	2–1	Sribhumi	Kolkata
14:30	Rubina Khatun 17'; Shrabani Murmu (yellow card) 45+5'; Naorem Priyangka Devi 56'	Report	Karishma Purushottam Shirvoikar 36'; Yumnam Kamala Devi (yellow card) 38'	Stadium: East Bengal Ground; Attendance: 537; Referee: Anindita Sana

29 March 2026 3	Kalighat Sports Lovers Association	0–8	East Bengal	Kolkata
15:00		Report	Astam Oraon 23', 26', 45+1', 65'; Rubina Khatun 40', 75'; Sandhya Maity 90'; Dipika Oraon (yellow card) 90+2'; Naorem Priyangka Devi 90+2'	Stadium: East Bengal Ground; Attendance: 300; Referee: Bipasha Biswas

2 April 2026 4	East Bengal	21–0	Dipti Sangha	Kolkata
15:00	Naorem Priyangka Devi 5', 22', 56', 76'; Astam Oraon 27', 36', 42', 53', 70'; Purnima Das 45+3'; Shrabani Murmu 45+4'; Sandhya Maity 63', 67', 84', 89', 90'; Hemam Shilky Devi 65', 72', 80', 90+2'	Report		Stadium: East Bengal Ground; Attendance: 50; Referee: Hamira Ansari

4 April 2026 5	West Bengal Police	0–6	East Bengal	Kolkata
15:00		Report	Naorem Priyangka Devi 15'; Astam Oraon 22'; Sathi Debnath 65'; Hemam Shilky Devi 67', 78', 84'	Stadium: East Bengal Ground

20 April 2026 6	United Kolkata	0–2	East Bengal	Kolkata
15:00		Report	Rubina Khatun (yellow card) 66'; Astam Oraon 78'; Loitongbam Ashalata Devi 87' (pen.)	Stadium: East Bengal Ground; Attendance: 600; Referee: Mahi Tudu

22 April 2026 7	Chandney	0–3 (Note: Walkover)	East Bengal	Kolkata
15:00		Report		Stadium: East Bengal Ground
Note: Chandney decided not to field a team hence, East Bengal was awarded a walkover.

13 May 2026 Championship Round	Jyotirmoy AC	0–20	East Bengal	Kolkata
15:00		Report	Sulanjana Raul 4', 42', 56', 64'; Astam Oraon 9'; Rubina Khatun 14'; Naorem Priyangka Devi 31', 49'; Sandhya Maity 35', 36', 73', 78', 89'; Birsi Oraon 39', 81', 83'; Shrabani Murmu 62'; Antasia Oraon 66'; Purnima Das 90+1', 90+4'	Stadium: East Bengal Ground

16 May 2026 Championship Round	Police AC	0–7	East Bengal	Kolkata
15:00		Report	Hemam Shilky Devi 25'; Sulanjana Raul 35', 53'; Birsi Oraon 45+2'; Sathi Debnath 77'; Rubina Khatun 81'; Sandhya Maity 90+6'	Stadium: East Bengal Ground

19 May 2026 Championship Round	New Alipore Suruchi Sangha	0–3 (Note: Walkover)	East Bengal	Kolkata
15:00		Report		Stadium: East Bengal Ground
Note: Suruchi Sangha decided not to field a team hence, East Bengal was awarded a walkover.

21 May 2026 Championship Round	SSB Women	1–12	East Bengal	Kolkata
15:00	Mina Khatun 88'	Report	Sulanjana Raul 9', 31', 32', 45', 55', 72'; Sandhya Maity 11', 39'; Purnima Das 44'; Antasia Oraon 75'; Sathi Debnath 86'; Supriya Kispotta 68'	Stadium: East Bengal Ground

== Statistics ==
=== Goal scorers ===
As of 21 May 2026

Rank	No.	Pos.	Nat.	Name	AFC Women's Champions League	SAFF Club Championship	Indian Women's League	Kanyashree Cup	Total
1	10	FW	(Uganda)	Fazila Ikwaput	2	9	20	—	31
2	22	FW	(India)	Sulanjana Raul	0	3	6	12	21
3	5	DF	(India)	Astam Oraon	0	0	1	13	14
3	14	FW	(India)	Sandhya Maity	—	—	—	14	14
5	11	MF	(India)	Naorem Priyangka Devi	—	—	2	10	12
6	7	MF	(India)	Soumya Guguloth	0	0	10	—	10
6	19	MF	(India)	Shilky Devi Hemam	1	1	0	8	10
8	16	MF	(Uganda)	Resty Nanziri	1	2	5	—	8
9	17	MF	(India)	Sathi Debnath	0	0	0	5	5
9	25	FW	(India)	Shrabani Murmu	0	0	0	5	5
9	32	FW	(India)	Rubina Khatun	0	0	0	5	5
9	38	FW	(India)	Purnima Das	—	—	—	5	5
9	44	FW	(India)	Birsi Oraon	—	—	—	5	5
14	26	MF	(India)	Antasia Oraon	—	—	—	4	4
15	14	MF	(India)	Karthika Angamuthu	0	0	2	0	2
16	4	DF	(India)	Loitongbam Ashalata Devi	0	0	0	1	1
16	6	DF	(India)	Sarita Yumnam	0	0	0	1	1
16	8	MF	(India)	Sangita Basfore	1	—	0	—	1
16	15	DF	(India)	Susmita Lepcha	0	0	1	0	1
16	20	DF	(India)	Fulmani Kharia	—	—	—	1	1
16	23	FW	(India)	Supriya Kispotta	—	—	—	1	1
16	~~99~~	FW	(India)	Jyoti Chouhan	0	1	0	—	1
Own Goals					0	0	0	0	0
Total					5	16	47	90	158

=== Assists ===
As of 18 May 2026

Rank	No.	Pos.	Nat.	Name	AFC Women's Champions League	SAFF Club Championship	Indian Women's League	Kanyashree Cup	Total
1	10	FW	(Uganda)	Fazila Ikwaput	1	3	6	—	9
2	6	RB	(India)	Sarita Yumnam	0	3	4	—	7
2	7	MF	(India)	Soumya Guguloth	0	3	4	—	7
2	16	MF	(Uganda)	Resty Nanziri	1	1	5	—	7
5	4	DF	(India)	Ashalata Devi Loitongbam	0	1	5	—	6
5	15	LB	(India)	Sushmita Lepcha	0	1	5	—	6
6	19	MF	(India)	Hemam Shilky Devi	0	1	4	—	5
8	22	FW	(India)	Sulanjana Raul	0	2	2	—	4
9	5	DF	(India)	Astam Oraon	0	0	1	—	1
9	14	MF	(India)	Karthika Angamuthu	0	0	1	—	1
9	20	MF	(Uganda)	Amnah Nababi	1	0	0	—	1
Total					3	15	32	—	50

== See also ==
- 2025–26 in Indian football
- 2025–26 East Bengal FC season (Men's)
