= 2024–25 East Bengal FC Women season =

2024–25 football season for East Bengal FC Women

East Bengal Women
2024–25 season
- Owner: Emami East Bengal FC Pvt. Ltd.
- Head coach: Anthony Andrews
- Stadium: East Bengal Ground
- Indian Women's League: Champions
- Calcutta Football League: Champions
- Top goalscorer: League: Elshaddai Acheampong (10 goals); All: Elshaddai Acheampong (10 goals)
- Biggest win: 14–1 Sarojini Naidu OSC (9 May 2025, CWFL)
- Biggest defeat: 2–3 Gokulam Kerala (2 February 2025, IWL)
Home colours	Away colours	Third colours
- All statistics correct as of 27 May 2025.

The 2024–25 season is the 6th season in the history of East Bengal FC (women). The team competed in the Indian Women's League and the Calcutta Women's Football League and in a historic season for the club, won a domestic double of winning both the tournaments, including lifting the inaugural IWL title and earning a qualification for the 2025–26 AFC Women's Champions League.

== Background ==
East Bengal Women's team finished 6th in the 2023–24 Indian Women's League. After spending two seasons in the IWL, the East Bengal team management made efforts to build a strong squad for the 2024–25 season, and roped in India women's national football team players: Sandhiya Ranganathan, Soumya Guguloth, Loitongbam Ashalata Devi, Ngangbam Sweety Devi, Anju Tamang, Karthika Angamuthu, Elangbam Panthoi Chanu and Naorem Priyangka Devi, along with three foreign players: Elshaddai Acheampong of Ghana, Resty Nanziri of Uganda and Maurine Achieng of Kenya. East Bengal also roped in the two-time IWL-winning coach Anthony Andrews from Gokulam Kerala by paying a record transfer fee in women's football in India.

== Squad ==
As of 7 January 2025

Note: Flags indicate national team as defined under FIFA eligibility rules; some limited exceptions apply. Players may hold more than one non-FIFA nationality.

No.	Pos.	Nation	Player
1	GK	IND	Elangbam Panthoi Chanu
2	DF	IND	Ngangbam Sweety Devi (captain)
3	MF	IND	Riya Sarkar
4	DF	IND	Loitongbam Ashalata Devi
5	DF	IND	Astam Oraon
6	DF	IND	Sarita Yumnam
7	MF	IND	Soumya Guguloth
8	MF	IND	Sangita Basfore
9	FW	IND	Anju Tamang
10	FW	GHA	Elshaddai Acheampong
11	MF	IND	Naorem Priyangka Devi
12	FW	IND	Sandhiya Ranganathan
14	MF	IND	Karthika Angamuthu
15	MF	IND	Sushmita Bardhan
16	GK	IND	Keisham Melody Chanu
17	MF	IND	Sathi Debnath

No.	Pos.	Nation	Player
18	MF	IND	Thandamoni Baskey
19	DF	IND	Supriya Kispotta
20	DF	IND	Trisha Mallick
21	MF	KEN	Maurine Achieng
22	FW	IND	Sulanjana Raul
23	FW	IND	Titli Sarkar
24	FW	UGA	Resty Nanziri
26	FW	IND	Priyanka Sujeesh
27	MF	IND	Cindy Remruatpuii Colney
30	MF	IND	Deblina Bhattacharjee
34	FW	IND	Sandhya Maity
41	GK	IND	Buli Sarkar
62	MF	IND	Sushmita Lepcha
77	MF	IND	Sonali Chemate

== Competitions ==
=== Overall record ===
Competition	First match	Last match	Starting round	Final position	Record							
Competition	First match	Last match	Starting round	Final position	Pld	W	D	L	GF	GA	GD	Win %
Indian Women's League	10 January 2025	18 April 2025	Matchday 1	Winners	14	12	1	1	38	10	+28	85.71
Calcutta Women's Football League	25 April 2025	27 May 2025	Group stage	Winners	9	7	1	1	45	7	+38	77.78
Total					23	19	2	2	83	17	+66	82.61

Last updated: 27 May 2025
Source: Soccerway

=== Indian Women's League ===
==== League Table ====
Pos	Team	Pld	W	D	L	GF	GA	GD	Pts	Qualification or relegation
1	East Bengal (C)	14	12	1	1	38	10	+28	37	Qualification for the Champions League preliminary stage and SAFF Club Championship
2	Gokulam Kerala	14	9	2	3	30	14	+16	29	
3	Sribhumi	14	7	1	6	27	23	+4	22	
4	Kickstart	14	4	6	4	20	20	0	18	
5	Sethu	14	5	2	7	18	23	−5	17	

Source: AIFF
Rules for classification: 1) points; 2) head-to-head points; 3) head-to-head goal difference; 4) goal difference; 5) number of goals scored; 6) drawing of lots
(C) Champions

==== Matches ====
Win Draw Loss Void

10 January 2025 1	East Bengal	2–0	Kickstart	Kolkata
14:30	Sandhiya Ranganathan 22'; Resty Nanziri 49'	Report		Stadium: East Bengal Ground; Attendance: 548; Referee: Neetu Rana; Player of the Match: Sandhiya Ranganathan (East Bengal)

15 January 2025 2	East Bengal	1–0	Sribhumi	Kolkata
14:30	Soumya Guguloth 77'	Report		Stadium: East Bengal Ground; Attendance: 463; Referee: Ruba Devi G. Player of the Match: Sulanjana Raul (East Bengal)

20 January 2025 3	Nita	1–4	East Bengal	Bhubaneswar
09:00	Gifty Acheampong 61'	Report	Anju Tamang 30'; Soumya Guguloth 48'; Resty Nanziri 50'; Sandhiya Ranganathan 67'	Stadium: Capital Football Arena; Attendance: 251; Referee: Usha; Player of the Match: Sandhiya Ranganathan (East Bengal)

28 January 2025 4	East Bengal	3–0	Sethu	Kolkata
14:30	Sandhiya Ranganathan 55'; Maurine Achieng 69'; Soumya Guguloth 80'	Report		Stadium: East Bengal Ground; Attendance: 700; Referee: Rachana Hasmukh Kamani; Player of the Match: Soumya Guguloth (East Bengal)

2 February 2025 5	Gokulam Kerala	3–2	East Bengal	Kozhikode
15:30	Fazila Ikwaput 2', 35', 52' (pen.)	Report	Resty Nanziri 86', 90+1'	Stadium: EMS Corporation Stadium; Attendance: 102; Referee: Pooja S. Player of the Match: Fazila Ikwaput (Gokulam Kerala)

6 February 2025 6	HOPS	0–1	East Bengal	New Delhi
14:00		Report	Soumya Guguloth 40'	Stadium: Ambedkar Stadium; Attendance: 164; Referee: Sen Hangma Subba; Player of the Match: Soumya Guguloth (East Bengal)

9 March 2025 7	Odisha	1–3	East Bengal	Bhubaneswar
15:30	Jennifer Kankam Yeboah 74'	Report	Elshaddai Acheampong 7', 31', 38' (pen.)	Stadium: Kalinga Stadium; Attendance: 72; Referee: Ranjita Devi Tekcham; Player of the Match: Elshaddai Acheampong (East Bengal)

15 March 2025 8	Kickstart	0–2	East Bengal	Bengaluru
16:00		Report	Loitongbam Ashalata Devi 35'; Sulanjana Raul 65'	Stadium: Bangalore Football Stadium; Attendance: 300; Referee: Usha; Player of the Match: Loitongbam Ashalata Devi (East Bengal)

21 March 2025 9	Sethu	2–4	East Bengal	Chennai
15:30	Amina Nababi 18'; Hadijah Nandago 64'	Report	Elshaddai Acheampong 9' (pen.), 15'; Resty Nanziri 45+3'; Soumya Guguloth 88'	Stadium: Jawaharlal Nehru Stadium; Attendance: 350; Referee: Ranjita Devi Tekcham; Player of the Match: Elshaddai Acheampong (East Bengal)

26 March 2025 10	East Bengal	5–1	Nita	Kolkata
15:30	Elshaddai Acheampong 9', 53' (pen.); Maurine Achieng 65'; Soumya Guguloth 71'; Sulanjana Raul 89'	Report	Rahama Jafaru 37'	Stadium: Kalyani Stadium; Attendance: 300; Referee: Pooja S Player of the Match: Elshaddai Acheampong (East Bengal)

31 March 2025 11	East Bengal	6–1	HOPS	Kolkata
16:00	Soumya Guguloth 3'; Sandhiya Ranganathan 7'; Maurine Achieng 11'; Karthika Angamuthu 54'; Resty Nanziri 90+2'; Elshaddai Acheampong 90+3'	Report	Gladys Amfobea 58'	Stadium: Kalyani Stadium; Attendance: 400; Referee: Sen Hangma Subba; Player of the Match: Resty Nanziri (East Bengal)

5 April 2025 12	Sribhumi	1–1	East Bengal	Kolkata
15:00	Sandra Atinga 88'	Report	Anju Tamang 82'	Stadium: Bibhutibhushan Stadium; Attendance: 300; Referee: Rachana Hasmukh Kamani; Player of the Match: Resty Nanziri (East Bengal)

11 April 2025 13	East Bengal	1–0	Odisha	Kolkata
16:00	Soumya Guguloth 67'	Report		Stadium: Kalyani Stadium; Attendance: 367; Referee: Kumari Nandita; Player of the Match: Soumya Guguloth (East Bengal)

18 April 2025 14	East Bengal	3–0	Gokulam Kerala	Kolkata
15:00	Elshaddai Acheampong 27', 37'; Soumya Guguloth 42'	Report		Stadium: East Bengal Ground; Attendance: 1920; Referee: Ranjita Devi Tekcham; Player of the Match: Elshaddai Acheampong (East Bengal)

=== Calcutta Women's Football League ===
==== League Table ====
Pos	Team	Pld	W	D	L	GF	GA	GD	Pts	Qualification	EBFC	JMAC	WBPS	KSLA	MOSS	SSWO	SNOS	UTSC
1	East Bengal	6	5	0	1	39	6	+33	15	Advanced to Championship round	—	2–0					14–1	
2	Jyotirmoy Athletic Club	6	4	1	1	14	4	+10	13	Advanced to Championship round		—		4–0		2–0		
3	WB Police Club	6	3	2	1	19	10	+9	11	Advanced to Championship round	2–6	1–1	—				4–2	
4	Kalighat Sports Lovers Association	6	3	1	2	17	6	+11	10	Advanced to Championship round	2–0		0–0	—			11–1	
5	Moitree Sansad	6	3	0	3	18	12	+6	9		1–8	1–2	1–2	1–0	—	6–0	8–0	
6	Sevayani S.W. Org	6	0	1	5	2	33	−31	1		0–9		0–10	0–4		—		
7	Sarojini Naidu OSC	6	0	1	5	6	44	−38	1			0–5				2–2	—	

Source: The Away End

Quarterfinals
A1	Sribhumi	5
B4	KSLA	0
A3	Suruchi Sangha	2
B2	Jyotirmoy AC	0
A2	Southern Samity	2
B3	WB Police	0
A4	SSB	0
B1	East Bengal	3

Semifinals
A1	Sribhumi	2
A3	Suruchi Sangha	1
A2	Southern Samity	0
B1	East Bengal	2

Finals
A1	Sribhumi	1 (2)
B1	East Bengal (p)	1 (4)

==== Matches ====
Win Draw Loss Void

25 April 2025 1	East Bengal	8–1	Moitree Sansad	Kolkata
15:30	Sulanjana Raul 4', 22'; Cindy Colney 17'; Priyanka Sujeesh 43'; Deblina Bhattacharjee 51', 56'; Sushmita Lepcha 79'; Karthika Angamuthu 89'			Stadium: Kishore Bharati Krirangan

2 May 2025 2	East Bengal	9–0	Sevayani S.W. Org	Kolkata
15:30	Sandhya Maity 7', 23'; Astam Oraon 35', 79', 90+2'; Karthika Angamuthu 50', 74', 83'; Rittika Chick Baraik 90+4'			Stadium: East Bengal Ground

6 May 2025 3	Kalighat Sports Lovers Association	2–0	East Bengal	Barrackpore
15:30				Stadium: Bibhutibhusan Stadium

9 May 2025 4	East Bengal	14–1	Sarojini Naidu OSC	Kolkata
15:30	Deblina Bhattacharjee 6', 45+3', 53'; Karthika Angamuthu 38', 58', 70'; Astam Oraon 41', 68', 88'; Pandimit Lepcha 45+1', 74'; Sushmita Bardhan 63'; Sathi Debnath 72'; Priyanka Sujeesh 76'			Stadium: Rabindra Sarobar Stadium

13 May 2025 5	East Bengal	2–0	Jyotirmoy Athletic Club	Kolkata
15:30	Pandimit Lepcha 18'; Priyanka Sujeesh 65'			Stadium: East Bengal Ground

16 May 2025 6	East Bengal	6–2	WB Police Club	Kolkata
15:30	Sandhya Maity 7'; Pandimit Lepcha 12', 34'; Sushmita Bardhan 31'; Sarita Yumnam 42'; Sulanjana Raul 87'			Stadium: East Bengal Ground

19 May 2025 Quarter-Final	East Bengal	3–0	SSB Women	Kolkata
15:15 IST	Sandhya Maity 19'; Pandimit Lepcha 68'; Sulanjana Raul 78'	Report		Stadium: East Bengal Ground

23 May 2025 Semi-Final	East Bengal	2–0	KFA Southern Samity	Kolkata
15:15 IST	Sulanjana Raul 24'; Sandhya Maity 57'	Report		Stadium: East Bengal Ground

27 May 2025 Final	Sreebhumi	1–1 (2–4 p)	East Bengal	Kolkata
15:00 IST	Rimpa Haldar 51'	Report; Report	Sulanjana Raul 49'	Stadium: Kishore Bharati Krirangan; Attendance: 3,000; Referee: Kusum Mandi
	Penalties
	Apurna Narzary (penalty missed); Anita Kumari (penalty scored); Mousumi Murmu (penalty missed); Rani Bhowmick (penalty scored)		Sushmita Bardhan (penalty missed); Karthika Angamuthu (penalty scored); Sarita Yumnam (penalty scored); Deblina Bhattacharjee (penalty scored); Sulanjana Raul (penalty scored)

== Statistics ==
=== Goal scorers ===
As of 27 May 2025

Rank	No.	Pos.	Nat.	Name	Indian Women's League	Kanyashree Cup	Total
1	10	FW	(Ghana)	Elshaddai Acheampong	10	—	10
2	7	RW	(India)	Soumya Guguloth	9	—	9
3	14	CM	(India)	Karthika Angamuthu	1	7	8
3	22	FW	(India)	Sulanjana Raul	2	6	8
5	5	CB	(India)	Astam Oraon	0	6	6
5	24	FW	(Uganda)	Resty Nanziri	6	—	6
5	32	FW	(India)	Pandimit Lepcha	0	6	6
8	30	AM	(India)	Deblina Bhattacharjee	0	5	5
8	34	AM	(India)	Sandhya Maity	0	5	5
10	12	LW	(India)	Sandhiya Ranganathan	4	—	4
11	21	AM	(Kenya)	Maurine Achieng	3	—	3
11	26	RW	(India)	Priyanka Sujeesh	0	3	3
13	9	LW	(India)	Anju Tamang	2	—	2
13	15	AM	(India)	Sushmita Bardhan	0	2	2
15	4	CB	(India)	Loitongbam Ashalata Devi	1	—	1
15	6	RB	(India)	Sarita Yumnam	0	1	1
15	17	AM	(India)	Sathi Debnath	0	1	1
15	27	AM	(India)	Cindy Remruatpuii Colney	0	1	1
15	62	LB	(India)	Sushmita Lepcha	0	1	1
15	65	FW	(India)	Rittika Chick Baraik	0	1	1
Total					38	45	83

== See also ==
- 2024–25 in Indian football
