= 2024–25 Calcutta Women's Football League =

Calcutta Women's Football League
- Season: 2024–25
- Dates: 25 April – 27 May 2025
- Champions: East Bengal (3rd title)
- Promoted: Suruchi Sangha ▲ (IWL2)
- Matches: 49
- Goals: 228 (4.65 per match)
- Biggest home win: East Bengal 14–1 Sarojini Naidu OSC (9 May 2025)
- Biggest away win: Chandney SC 0–12 Sribhumi (1 May 2025)
- Highest scoring: East Bengal 14–1 Sarojini Naidu OSC (9 May 2025)
- Longest winning run: Sribhumi (8 matches)
- Longest unbeaten run: Sribhumi (8 matches)
- Longest losing run: Bally Gramanchal Krira Samity (6 matches)

2024–25 Calcutta Women's Football League is the 29th season of the Calcutta Women's Football League, also known as the Kanyashree Cup.

The season consists of 16 teams participating in the league, with the teams in the group stage divided into two groups consisting of eight teams respectively. The tournament began on 25 April 2025 with East Bengal vs Moitri Sansad match at the Kishore Bharati Krirangan.

== Teams ==
CWFL participants
Group A	Group B
Bally Gramanchal Krira Samity	East Bengal
Chandney SC	Jyotirmoy Athletic Club
Dipti Sangha	Kalighat Sports Lovers Association
KFA Southern Samity	Moitree Sansad
Mohammedan Sporting	Sarojini Naidu OSC
New Alipore Suruchi Sangha	Sevayani S.W. Org
Sribhumi	United Students Club
SSB Women	WB Police Club

▲ Promoted from 2023 to 2024 CWFL B Division

- SSB Women
- Dipti Sangha

== Venues ==
- Kishore Bharati Krirangan
- Kakinara Narayanpur United Ground
- HB Block Ground
- Dr. BR Ambedkar Ground, Gayeshpur
- Rabindra Sarobar Stadium
- East Bengal Ground
- Naihati Stadium
- Mohammedan Sporting Ground
- Rishi Aurobindo Maidan, Konnagar
- SSB Ground
- Barrackpore Stadium

== Group stage ==
=== Group A ===
Pos	Team	Pld	W	D	L	GF	GA	GD	Pts	Qualification	SBFC	KFSS	NASS	SSBW	DPSG	CDSC	BGKS	MDSC
1	Sribhumi	6	6	0	0	30	2	+28	18	Advanced to Championship round	—	2–0	1–0		5–0			
2	KFA Southern Samity	6	4	1	1	15	3	+12	13	Advanced to Championship round		—			2–0	1–0		
3	Suruchi Sangha	6	4	0	2	25	7	+18	12	Advanced to Championship round		0–4	—				11–1	
4	SSB Women	6	3	1	2	13	5	+8	10	Advanced to Championship round	1–2	1–1	0–1	—			6–1	
5	Dipti Sangha	6	2	0	4	5	15	−10	6				1–7	0–1	—	2–0		
6	Chandney SC	6	1	0	5	1	25	−24	3		0–12		0–6	0–4		—	1–0	
7	Bally Gramanchal Krira Samity	6	0	0	6	3	35	−32	0		1–8	0–7			0–2		—	
8	Mohammedan Sporting (R)	0	0	0	0	0	0	0	0	Withdrew								—

Source: The Away End
(R) Relegated

=== Group B ===
Pos	Team	Pld	W	D	L	GF	GA	GD	Pts	Qualification	EBFC	JMAC	WBPS	KSLA	MOSS	SSWO	SNOS	UTSC
1	East Bengal	6	5	0	1	39	6	+33	15	Advanced to Championship round	—	2–0					14–1	
2	Jyotirmoy Athletic Club	6	4	1	1	14	4	+10	13	Advanced to Championship round		—		4–0		2–0		
3	WB Police Club	6	3	2	1	19	10	+9	11	Advanced to Championship round	2–6	1–1	—				4–2	
4	Kalighat Sports Lovers Association	6	3	1	2	17	6	+11	10	Advanced to Championship round	2–0		0–0	—			11–1	
5	Moitree Sansad	6	3	0	3	18	12	+6	9		1–8	1–2	1–2	1–0	—	6–0	8–0	
6	Sevayani S.W. Org	6	0	1	5	2	33	−31	1		0–9		0–10	0–4		—		
7	Sarojini Naidu OSC	6	0	1	5	6	44	−38	1			0–5				2–2	—	
8	United Students Club (R)	0	0	0	0	0	0	0	0	Withdrew		~~27 Apr~~						—

Source: The Away End
(R) Relegated

== Championship round ==
=== Bracket ===
Quarterfinals
A1	Sribhumi	5
B4	KSLA	0
A3	Suruchi Sangha	2
B2	Jyotirmoy AC	0
A2	Southern Samity	2
B3	WB Police	0
A4	SSB	0
B1	East Bengal	3

Semifinals
A1	Sribhumi	2
A3	Suruchi Sangha	1
A2	Southern Samity	0
B1	East Bengal	2

Finals
A1	Sribhumi	1 (2)
B1	East Bengal (p)	1 (4)

=== Quarter Finals ===
==== Matches ====
19 May 2025	Sribhumi	5–0	Kalighat Sports Lovers Association	Kalyani
15:15 IST	Mamta 24'; Sujata Mahata 53', 61'; Kabita Soren 72'; Sonali Soren 83'	Report		Stadium: Kalyani Stadium

19 May 2025	East Bengal	3–0	SSB Women	Kolkata
15:15 IST	Sandhya Maity 19'; Pandimit Lepcha 68'; Sulanjana Raul 78'	Report		Stadium: East Bengal Ground

19 May 2025	KFA Southern Samity	2–0	WB Police Club	Kolkata
15:15 IST	Barsha Maji 22'; Piyali Roy 77'	Report		Stadium: Rabindra Sarobar Stadium

19 May 2025	Jyotirmoy Athletic Club	0–2	Suruchi Sangha	Naihati
15:15 IST		Report	Pukhrambam Mira Devi 69'; Singo Murmu 71'	Stadium: Bankimanjali Stadium

=== Semi Finals ===
==== Matches ====
23 May 2025	Sribhumi	2–1	Suruchi Sangha	Kalyani
15:15 IST	Mousumi Murmu 81'; Rimpa Haldar 90+2'	Report	Roshni Baskey 68'	Stadium: Kalyani Stadium

23 May 2025	East Bengal	2–0	KFA Southern Samity	Kolkata
15:15 IST	Sulanjana Raul 24'; Sandhya Maity 57'	Report		Stadium: East Bengal Ground

=== Final ===
==== Summary ====
The 2024–25 Kanyashree Cup final was held at the Kishore Bharati Krirangan on 27 May 2025 between Sreebhumi and East Bengal. This was the third consecutive season where both sides met for the title decider. Sreebhumi, the holders of the trophy, reached their third final while East Bengal reached their sixth final, having already won in 2001 and 2023, and been runner-up thrice in 2002, 2020 and 2024. East Bengal took the lead in the final in the forty-ninth minute when Sulanjana Raul scored from a set-piece movement however, Sreebhumi equalised just two minutes later with Rimpa Haldar finding the back of the net as the match remained tied till the end of ninety minutes and the title was decided on penalties. East Bengal custodian Mamani Das saved two spot kicks as East Bengal became champions for the third time.

==== Match ====
27 May 2025
15:00 IST

Sreebhumi	1–1	East Bengal
Rimpa Haldar 51'	Report; Report	Sulanjana Raul 49'
Penalties
Apurna Narzary (penalty missed); Anita Kumari (penalty scored); Mousumi Murmu (penalty missed); Rani Bhowmick (penalty scored)	2–4	Sushmita Bardhan (penalty missed); Karthika Angamuthu (penalty scored); Sarita Yumnam (penalty scored); Deblina Bhattacharjee (penalty scored); Sulanjana Raul (penalty scored)

Kishore Bharati Krirangan, Kolkata
Attendance: 3,000
Referee: Kusum Mandi

Sreebhumi	East Bengal

GK	1	Adrija Sarkhel (c)	(substituted off) 90+3'
DF	2	Moushumi Das	(substituted off) 85'
DF	4	Mini Roy
DF	5	Saraswati Murmu	(substituted off) 90+3'
FW	7	Rimpa Haldar	(substituted off) 90+3'
FW	8	Kabita Saren
FW	10	Sujata Mahata
DF	14	Kretina Sangma
FW	18	Mousumi Murmu
DF	19	Anita Kumari
DF	28	Mamta
Substitutions:
DF	3	Bandana Roy
MF	12	Barnali Mahata	(substituted on) 85'	(substituted off) 90+3'
FW	15	Gita Das	(substituted on) 90+3'
FW	20	Apurna Narzary	(substituted on) 90+3'
GK	21	Jyotsna Bara	(substituted on) 90+3'
MF	22	Lalita Boypai
FW	24	Tania Kanti
DF	27	Sudha Ankita Tirkey
MF	32	Sibani Sharma
FW	36	Rani Bhowmick	(substituted on) 90+3'
Head Coach:
Sujata Kar

DF	5	Astam Oraon
DF	6	Sarita Yumnam (c)
MF	14	Karthika Angamuthu	(yellow card) 64'
MF	17	Sathi Debnath
FW	22	Sulanjana Raul
MF	27	Cindy Remruatpuii Colney
MF	30	Deblina Bhattacharjee
FW	32	Pandimit Lepcha		(substituted off) 87'
FW	34	Sandhya Maity		(substituted off) 90+1'
GK	51	Mamani Das
DF	62	Sushmita Lepcha		(substituted off) 39'
Substitutions:
MF	3	Riya Sarkar
MF	15	Sushmita Bardhan		(substituted on) 90+1'
DF	19	Supriya Kispotta		(substituted on) 39'
DF	20	Trisha Mallick
DF	28	Asha Khariya
MF	29	Dipika Oraon
MF	31	Angela Bhutia		(substituted on) 87'
FW	35	Ritika Chick Baraik
GK	41	Buli Sarkar
Head Coach:
Anthony Andrews

Player of the Match:
Rimpa Haldar (Sreebhumi)

Assistant referees:
Sujata Palit
Shima Bairagi
Fourth official:
Rajashri Hansda
Match commissioner:
Subrata Das

Match rules

- 90 minutes.
- No extra time.
- Penalty shoot-out if scores still level.
- Ten named substitutes
- Maximum of five substitutions.
