= 2023–24 Calcutta Women's Football League =

Football league season in India

Calcutta Women's Football League
- Season: 2023–24
- Dates: 22 November 2023–29 December 2023
- Champions: Sreebhumi (1st title)
- Promoted: Suruchi Sangha ▲ (IWL2)
- Matches: 57
- Goals: 291 (5.11 per match)
- Top goalscorer: Sulanjana Raul (17 goals)
- Biggest home win: Sreebhumi 18–0 Sevayani S.W. Org; 29 November 2023
- Biggest away win: Kalighat SLA 1–11 East Bengal; 22 November 2023
- Highest scoring: Sreebhumi 18–0 Sevayani S.W. Org; 29 November 2023
- Longest winning run: Sreebhumi (8 matches)
- Longest unbeaten run: East Bengal; Sreebhumi (11 matches)
- Longest losing run: Invention FCC (7 matches)

2023–24 Calcutta Women's Football League was the 28th season of the Calcutta Women's Football League, also known as the Kanyashree Cup.

The season consists of 15 teams participating in the league, with the teams in the group stage divided into two groups consisting of eight and seven teams respectively. The tournament began on 22 November 2023 with defending champions East Bengal defeating Kalighat Sports Lovers Association 11–1 at the East Bengal Ground. On 29 December, Sreebhumi defeated the defending champions East Bengal 2–1 to lift their maiden Kanyashree Cup title.

== Teams ==
CWFL participants
Group A	Group B
Bally Gramanchal Krira Samity	Chandney SC
East Bengal	Jyotirmoy Athletic Club
Invention FCC	KFA Southern Samity
Kalighat Sports Lovers Association	Moitree Sansad
Mohammedan Sporting	Sevayani S.W. Org
New Alipore Suruchi Sangha	Sreebhumi
Sarojini Naidu OSC	United Students Club
WB Police Club	—

== Venues ==
- Rabindra Sarobar Stadium
- East Bengal Ground
- Naihati Stadium
- Amal Dutta Stadium (Dumdum Surer Math)
- Mohammedan Sporting Ground
- Rishi Aurobindo Maidan, Konnagar
- Bidhannagar Sports Complex
- SAI Ground, Salt Lake
- Mohun Bagan Ground
- Netaji Sports Complex, Kamalgazi
- Barrackpore Stadium
- Dr Ambedkar Ground, Gayeshpur
- Kishore Bharati Krirangan

== Group stage ==
=== Group A ===
Pos	Team	Pld	W	D	L	GF	GA	GD	Pts	Qualification
1	East Bengal	7	6	1	0	44	2	+42	19	Advanced to Championship round
2	New Alipore Suruchi Sangha	7	6	1	0	21	0	+21	19	Advanced to Championship round
3	WB Police Club	7	4	1	2	11	10	+1	13	Advanced to Championship round
4	Kalighat Sports Lovers Association	7	3	1	3	25	22	+3	10	
5	Sarojini Naidu OSC	7	2	1	4	11	21	−10	7	
6	Mohammedan Sporting	7	2	1	4	7	17	−10	7	
7	Bally Gramanchal Krira Samity	7	2	0	5	8	21	−13	6	
8	Invention FCC	7	0	0	7	0	34	−34	0	Withdrew

Source: The Away End

==== Matches ====
22 November 2023	Kalighat Sports Lovers Association	1–11	East Bengal	Kolkata
14:30 IST	Jyoti Kumari 83'	Report	Sulanjana Raul 12', 35'; Sushmita Bardhan 29'; Tulsi Hembram 32', 43', 45+2'; Sarjida Khatun 47', 54'; Sonali Mondal 53', 90+3'; Sandhya Maity 66'	Stadium: East Bengal Ground; MVP: Sulanjana Raul (East Bengal)

23 November 2023	Invention FCC	0–5	Bally Gramanchal Krira Samity	Kolkata
13:30 IST		Report	Payel Paul 16'; Remi Thokchom 18', 30', 82'; Kanika Sanfui 69'	Stadium: Rabindra Sarobar Stadium

23 November 2023	New Alipore Suruchi Sangha	3–0	Mohammedan Sporting	Kolkata
13:30 IST		(W.O.); Report		Stadium: Mohammedan Sporting Ground
Note: Mohammedan Sporting could not field a team and handed a walkover to New Alipore Suruchi Sangha.

23 November 2023	WB Police Sports Club	3–1	Sarojini Naidu OSC	Gayeshpur
13:30 IST	Neha Mondal 24'; Rani Mondal 57'; Sangita Roy 62'	Report	Sabina Khatun 78' (o.g.)	Stadium: Dr Ambedkar Ground

25 November 2023	Kalighat Sports Lovers Association	14–0	Invention FCC	Kolkata
13:30 IST	Mariyam Khatun 11', 19', 25', 37', 40', 79'; Jyoti Kumari 24'; Parmila Das 57', 62', 77', 81', 85', 89'; Rakhi Kachap 65'	Report		Stadium: Kishore Bharati Krirangan

25 November 2023	Mohammedan Sporting	1–2	Bally Gramanchal Krira Samity	Kolkata
13:30 IST	Ropni Hansdah 45+1'	Report	Kajal Mondal 7'; Remi Thokchom 81'	Stadium: Mohammedan Sporting Ground

25 November 2023	WB Police Sports Club	1–7	East Bengal	Kolkata
14:30 IST	Radha Besra 49'	Report	Sushmita Bardhan 6', 29'; Tulsi Hembram 15'; Sulanjana Raul 37', 84'; Sonali Mondal 87', 89'	Stadium: East Bengal Ground

25 November 2023	Sarojini Naidu OSC	0–3	New Alipore Suruchi Sangha	Barrackpore
13:30 IST		Report	Deblina Bhattacharya 44'; Sanjana Kerketta 49'; Koyel Halder 57'	Stadium: Bibhutibhushan Stadium

28 November 2023	WB Police Sports Club	2–1	Kalighat Sports Lovers Association	Kolkata
13:30 IST	Sangita Roy 8'; Padmabati Majhi 85'	Report	Rakhi Kachap 74'	Stadium: Rabindra Sarobar Stadium

28 November 2023	Bally Gramanchal Krira Samity	0–5	Sarojini Naidu OSC	Gayeshpur
13:30 IST		Report	Fatema Khatun 10'; Swapna Roy 25', 56'; Rakhi Mandal 35'; Sneha Minj 50'	Stadium: Dr Ambedkar Ground

28 November 2023	New Alipore Suruchi Sangha	0–0	East Bengal	Kolkata
14:30 IST		Report		Stadium: East Bengal Ground

28 November 2023	Mohammedan Sporting	3–0	Invention FCC	Kolkata
13:30 IST		(W.O.)		Stadium: Mohammedan Sporting Ground
Note: Invention FCC withdrew their team and hence, a walkover win was awarded to Mohammedan Sporting.

30 November 2023	Sarojini Naidu OSC	0–2	Mohammedan Sporting	Kolkata
13:30 IST		Report	Labani Mistri 2', 75'	Stadium: Mohammedan Sporting Ground

30 November 2023	New Alipore Suruchi Sangha	5–0	Kalighat Sports Lovers Association	Kolkata
13:30 IST	Neelan Tirkey 20'; Sanjana Kerketta 45+2', 58', 59'; Priya Rui Das 90+1'	Report		Stadium: Mohun Bagan Ground

30 November 2023	East Bengal	5–0	Bally Gramanchal Krira Samity	Kolkata
14:30 IST	Sushmita Bardhan 10', 15'; Sulanjana Raul 18', 65'; Tulsi Hembram 62'	Report		Stadium: East Bengal Ground

30 November 2023	WB Police Sports Club	3–0	Invention FCC	Kolkata
13:30 IST		(W.O.)
Note: Invention FCC withdrew their team and hence, a walkover win was awarded to WB Police Sports Club.

2 December 2023	New Alipore Suruchi Sangha	1–0	WB Police Sports Club	Kolkata
13:30 IST	Sanjana Kerketta 61'	Report		Stadium: Mohammedan Sporting Ground

2 December 2023	Mohammedan Sporting	0–7	East Bengal	Kolkata
13:30 IST		Report	Sulanjana Raul 20', 30', 37'; Tulsi Hembram 26', 47', 53'; Sarjida Khatun 73'	Stadium: Kishore Bharati Krirangan

2 December 2023	Bally Gramanchal Krira Samity	1–2	Kalighat Sports Lovers Association	Kolkata
13:30 IST	Maibam Nandeshwori Devi 52'	Report	Mariyam Khatun 23', 63'	Stadium: Bidhannagar Municipal Ground

2 December 2023	Sarojini Naidu OSC	3–0	Invention FCC	Kolkata
13:30 IST		(W.O.)
Note: Invention FCC withdrew their team and hence, a walkover win was awarded to Sarojini Naidu OSC.

4 December 2023	Bally Gramanchal Krira Samity	0–2	WB Police Sports Club	Kolkata
13:30 IST		Report	Rani Mondal 16'; Rama Murmu 77'	Stadium: Bidhannagar Municipal Ground

4 December 2023	East Bengal	11–0	Sarojini Naidu OSC	Kolkata
13:30 IST	Tulsi Hembram 8'; Sulanjana Raul 38', 43', 52', 78', 82', 86'; Sarjida Khatun 53'; Shashwati Sarkar 64'; Sandhya Maity 90', 90+3'	Report		Stadium: East Bengal Ground

4 December 2023	Kalighat Sports Lovers Association	5–1	Mohammedan Sporting	Kolkata
13:30 IST	Mariyam Khatun 24'; Parmila Das 49', 50', 54', 82'	Report	Barsha Maji 22'	Stadium: Mohammedan Sporting Ground

4 December 2023	New Alipore Suruchi Sangha	3–0	Invention FCC	Kolkata
13:30 IST		(W.O.)
Note: Invention FCC withdrew their team and hence, a walkover win was awarded to New Alipore Suruchi Sangha.

6 December 2023	East Bengal	3–0	Invention FCC	Kolkata
13:30 IST		(W.O.)
Note: Invention FCC withdrew their team and hence, a walkover win was awarded to East Bengal.

6 December 2023	Bally Gramanchal Krira Samity	0–6	New Alipore Suruchi Sangha	Barrackpore
13:30 IST		Report	Sanjana Kerketta 13', 33'; Neelam Tirkey 15', 26', 76'; Salina Kumari 57'	Stadium: Barrackpore Stadium

6 December 2023	Sarojini Naidu OSC	2–2	Kalighat Sports Lovers Association	Kolkata
13:30 IST	Fatema Khatun 8', 10'	Report	Parmila Das 15'; Rakhi Kachap 63'	Stadium: Mohun Bagan Ground

6 December 2023	Mohammedan Sporting	0–0	WB Police Sports Club	Kolkata
13:30 IST		Report		Stadium: Mohammedan Sporting Ground

=== Group B ===
Pos	Team	Pld	W	D	L	GF	GA	GD	Pts	Qualification
1	Sreebhumi	6	6	0	0	61	0	+61	18	Advanced to Championship round
2	Moitree Sansad	6	4	1	1	18	10	+8	13	Advanced to Championship round
3	Jyotirmoy Athletic Club	6	3	1	2	16	16	0	10	Advanced to Championship round
4	United Students Club	6	3	0	3	15	19	−4	9	
5	KFA Southern Samity	6	1	2	3	12	13	−1	5	
6	Chandney SC	6	1	2	3	6	16	−10	5	
7	Sevayani S.W. Org	6	0	0	6	1	55	−54	0	

Source: The Away End

==== Matches ====
24 November 2023	Moitree Sansad	1–1	Chandney SC	Kolkata
13:30 IST	Suparna Biswas 19'	Report	Purnima Das 17'	Stadium: Amal Dutta Krirangan

24 November 2023	Jonaki United Student Club	2–1	KFA Southern Samity	Gayeshpur
13:30 IST	Anjali Sardar 26'; Bristi Santra 90+3'	Report	Shrabani Murmu 36'	Stadium: Dr Ambedkar Ground

24 November 2023	Jyotirmoy Athletic Club	11–0	Sevayani S.W. Org	Kamalgazi
13:30 IST	Tanushree Roy 10', 20', 36', 65', 68', 77', 83'; Anju Barla 23', 41', 47', 90+1'	Report		Stadium: Netaji Sports Complex

26 November 2023	KFA Southern Samity	0–6	Sreebhumi	Kolkata
13:30 IST		Report	Devneta Roy 27', 36'; Rimpa Haldar 32', 41', 67', 72'	Stadium: Amal Dutta Krirangan

26 November 2023	Jyotirmoy Athletic Club	1–0	Chandney SC	Gayeshpur
13:30 IST	Anju Barla 90+1'	Report		Stadium: Dr Ambedkar Ground

26 November 2023	Sevayani S.W. Org	0–8	Jonaki United Student Club	Kamalgazi
13:30 IST		Report	Bristi Santra 8', 17', 40', 64'; Jyoti Jayadar 22', 69', 75'; Sarasuti Murmu 45+1'	Stadium: Netaji Sports Complex

29 November 2023	Jyotirmoy Athletic Club	0–4	Moitree Sansad	Kamalgazi
13:30 IST		Report	Bishakha Barman 58', 90+2', 90+3'; Kajali Tudu 69'	Stadium: Netaji Sports Complex

29 November 2023	Sreebhumi	18–0	Sevayani S.W. Org	Kolkata
13:30 IST	Birsi Oraon 5'; Tania Kanti 8', 11', 20', 30', 60'; Sanchita Singha 29', 48', 52'; Kabita Saren 39', 41', 51'; Ratna Halder 42'; Sagorika Baiya 46', 58'; Punam Barla 75', 83', 86'	Report		Stadium: Amal Dutta Krirangan

29 November 2023	Jonaki United Student Club	2–0	Chandney SC	Kolkata
13:30 IST	Sampa Budhak 26' (o.g.); Ritu Bakchi 52'	Report		Stadium: Rabindra Sarobar Stadium

1 December 2023	Sevayani S.W. Org	0–8	KFA Southern Samity	Kamalgazi
13:30 IST		Report	Arpita Roy 9', 26', 42', 57'; Munni Kumari 22'; Nasimun Khatun 60'; Surmila Soren 70'; Shrabani Murmu 88'	Stadium: Netaji Sports Complex

1 December 2023	Jonaki United Student Club	1–4	Moitree Sansad	Kolkata
13:30 IST	Bristi Santra 16'	Report	Bishakha Barman 41', 45+1'; Kajali Tudu 53', 59'	Stadium: Rabindra Sarobar Stadium

1 December 2023	Chandney SC	0–9	Sreebhumi	Kolkata
13:30 IST		Report	Sanchita Singha 12', 20', 32'; Punam Barla 31'; Tania Kanti 38', 52'; Kabita Saren 43', 63'; Sagorika Baidya 70'	Stadium: Amal Dutta Krirangan

3 December 2023	Jonaki United Student Club	2–3	Jyotirmoy Athletic Club	Howrah
13:30 IST	Bristi Santra 28'; Saraswati Murmu 74'	Report	Tanisha Biswas 6'; Anju Barla 51'; Tanushree Roy 85'	Stadium: Makardah Union Club Play Ground

3 December 2023	KFA Southern Samity	2–2	Chandney SC	Kamalgazi
13:30 IST	Shrabani Murmu 45'; Arpita Roy 90'	Report	Purnima Das 10'; Keya Halder 45+2'	Stadium: Netaji Sports Complex

3 December 2023	Sreebhumi	8–0	Moitree Sansad	Kolkata
13:30 IST	Sanchita Singha 4', 23', 45+2'; Anita Oraon 22'; Mousumi Murmu 33'; Anita Kumari 61'; Sonali Soren 83'; Rimpa Haldar 90+3'	Report		Stadium: Amal Dutta Krirangan

5 December 2023	Chandney SC	3–1	Sevayani S.W. Org	Kolkata
13:30 IST	Koyel Majumder 46', 63', 89'	Report	Sania Khatun 4'	Stadium: Rabindra Sarobar Stadium

5 December 2023	Sreebhumi	9–0	Jyotirmoy Athletic Club	Kolkata
13:30 IST	Devneta Roy 7', 42', 65'; Sanchita Singha 11', 81'; Anita Kumari 35', 60'; Mini Roy 49'; Sonali Soren 57'	Report		Stadium: Amal Dutta Krirangan

5 December 2023	Moitree Sansad	2–0	KFA Southern Samity	Gayeshpur
13:30 IST	Kajali Tudu 53', 90'	Report		Stadium: Dr Ambedkar Ground

8 December 2023	Sreebhumi	11–0	Jonaki United Student Club	Kolkata
13:30 IST	Sanchita Singha 6', 11', 51'; Barnali Karar 13'; Gita Das 20', 71'; Rimpa Haldar 31', 41'; Rubina Khatun 35'; Kabita Saren 63'; Mousumi Murmu 72'	Report		Stadium: Amal Dutta Krirangan

8 December 2023	Sevayani S.W. Org	0–7	Moitree Sansad	Kolkata
13:30 IST		Report	Rita Baske 6'; Papy Mondal 11'; Bishakha Barman 25', 26', 48'; Nikita Mahata 33', 79'	Stadium: Rabindra Sarobar Stadium

8 December 2023	KFA Southern Samity	1–1	Jyotirmoy Athletic Club	Kamalgazi
13:30 IST	Shrabani Murmu 38'	Report	Sita Oraon 34'	Stadium: Netaji Sports Complex

== Championship round ==
Pos	Team	Pld	W	D	L	GF	GA	GD	Pts	Qualification
1	Sreebhumi	5	4	1	0	27	2	+25	13	Champions and qualification for 2023–24 Indian Women's League 2 (Note: If the top teams are already playing in national leagues, then the next highest ranked team would be eligible for Indian Women's League 2nd Division.)
2	East Bengal	5	3	1	1	11	3	+8	10	
3	Suruchi Sangha	5	2	2	1	5	4	+1	8	Qualification for 2024–25 Indian Women's League 2
4	Moitree Sansad	5	1	2	2	8	13	−5	5	
5	WB Police SC	5	1	2	2	7	13	−6	5	
6	Jyotirmoy Athletic Club	5	0	0	5	0	23	−23	0	

Source: The Away End

=== Matches ===
13 December 2023 Round 1	East Bengal	5–1	Moitree Sansad	Kolkata
14:30 IST	Tulsi Hembram 12', 37', 64'; Lourembam Menaka Devi 63'; Sulanjana Raul 90+1'	Report	Bishakha Barman 49'	Stadium: East Bengal Ground; Attendance: 100; Referee: Rajashri Hansda; MVP: Tulsi Hembram (East Bengal)

14 December 2023 Round 1	Sreebhumi	10–0	Jyotirmoy Athletic Club	Kolkata
13:30 IST	Sonali Soren 1', 30'; Mousumi Murmu 5', 75'; Yumlam Lali 19'; Rimpa Haldar 20', 52', 67', 71'; Rubina Khatun 80'	Report		Stadium: Bidhannagar Municipal Ground; Attendance: 50; Referee: Monika Jana; MVP: Rimpa Haldar (Sreebhumi)

14 December 2023 Round 1	WB Police SC	0–2	New Alipore Suruchi Sangha	Kolkata
13:30 IST		Report	Sanjana Kerketta 53', 73'	Stadium: Mohun Bagan Ground; Attendance: 100; Referee: Mahi Tudu; MVP: Supriya Kispotta (New Alipore SS)

19 December 2023 Round 2	East Bengal	2–0	New Alipore Suruchi Sangha	Kolkata
14:30 IST	Tulsi Hembram 22'; Sulanjana Raul 42'	Report		Stadium: East Bengal Ground; Attendance: 60; Referee: Mahi Tudu; MVP: Mugli Saren (East Bengal)

19 December 2023 Round 2	Jyotirmoy Athletic Club	0–5	WB Police SC	Kamalgazi
13:30 IST		Report	Sangita Roy 10', 28'; Neha Mondal 52', 69'; Rama Murmu 90+4'	Stadium: Netaji Sports Complex; Attendance: 599; Referee: Snigdha Mondal; MVP: Neha Mondal (WB Police Club)

19 December 2023 Round 2	Moitree Sansad	0–5	Sreebhumi	Kolkata
13:30 IST		Report	Sujata Mahata 2', 45'; Yumnam Lali 10'; Anita Kumari 21'; Rimpa Haldar 55'	Stadium: Amal Dutta Krirangan; Attendance: 200; Referee: Sayani Roy; MVP: Sujata Mahata (Sreebhumi)

23 December 2023 Round 3	New Alipore Suruchi Sangha	1–1	Sreebhumi	Kolkata
13:30 IST	Sanjana Kerketta 36'	Report	Sanchita Singha 45+2'	Stadium: Mohun Bagan Ground; Attendance: 200; Referee: Kanika Barman; MVP: Jyotsna Bara (New Alipur SS)

23 December 2023 Round 3	Jyotirmoy Athletic Club	0–4	Moitree Sansad	Kamalgazi
13:30 IST		Report	Sayani Dutta 10'; Bishakha Barman 29', 43'; Kajali Tudu 30'	Stadium: Netaji Sports Complex; Attendance: 300; Referee: Rajashri Hansda; MVP: Bishakha Barman (Moitree Sansad)

25 December 2023 Round 3	East Bengal	0–0	WB Police SC	Kolkata
14:30 IST		Report		Stadium: East Bengal Ground; Attendance: 100; Referee: Kanika Barman; MVP: Rumpa Malik (WB Police SC)

27 December 2023 Round 4	East Bengal	3–0	Jyotirmoy Athletic Club	Kolkata
14:30 IST	Sarjida Khatun 17', 61'; Singo Murmu 75'	Report		Stadium: East Bengal Ground; Attendance: 500; Referee: Rajashri Hansda; MVP: Singo Murmu (East Bengal)

27 December 2023 Round 4	Moitree Sansad	1–1	New Alipore Suruchi Sangha	Kolkata
13:30 IST	Rina Barman 63'	Report	Sanjana Kerketta 16'	Stadium: Mohun Bagan Ground; Attendance: 500; Referee: Monjira Khatun; MVP: Bishakha Barman (Moitree Sansad)

27 December 2023 Round 4	Sreebhumi	9–0	WB Police SC	Kolkata
13:30 IST	Rimpa Haldar 21', 32'; Barnali Karar 34'; Ratna Halder 45+1'; Kabita Saren 69', 90'; Sujata Mahata 75', 82', 87'	Report		Stadium: Amal Dutta Krirangan; Attendance: 400; Referee: Kanika Barman; MVP: Sujata Mahata (Sreebhumi)

29 December 2023 Round 5	WB Police SC	2–2	Moitree Sansad	Kolkata
13:30 IST	Sangita Roy; Radha Besra	Report	Kalyani Ray; Sayani Dutta	Stadium: Amal Dutta Krirangan

29 December 2023 Round 5	New Alipore Suruchi Sangha	1–0	Jyotirmoy Athletic Club	Kolkata
13:30 IST	Priya Roy	Report		Stadium: Mohun Bagan Ground

29 December 2023 Round 5	East Bengal	1–2	Sreebhumi	Kolkata
13:30 IST	Mamata Mahata 72'	Report	Rimpa Haldar 24'; Mousumi Murmu 27' (red card) 33'	Stadium: Kishore Bharati Krirangan; Attendance: 800; Referee: Monika Jana; MVP: Rimpa Haldar (Sreebhumi)

== Statistics ==
=== Top goal scorers ===
As of 29 December 2023

Rank	Nat.	Player	Club	Goals
1	(India)	Sulanjana Raul	East Bengal	17
2	(India)	Sanchita Singha	Sreebhumi	15
2	(India)	Rimpa Haldar	Sreebhumi	15
4	(India)	Tulsi Hembram	East Bengal	13
5	(India)	Parmila Das	Kalighat Sports Lovers Association	11
5	(India)	Bishakha Barman	Moitree Sansad	11
5	(India)	Sanjana Kerketta	New Alipore Suruchi Sangha	11
8	(India)	Mariyam Khatun	Kalighat Sports Lovers Association	9
9	(India)	Tanushree Roy	Jyotirmoy Athletic Club	8
9	(India)	Kabita Saren	Sreebhumi	8
11	(India)	Tania Kanti	Sreebhumi	7
11	(India)	Bristi Santra	Jonaki United Student Club	7
13	(India)	Anju Barla	Jyotirmoy Athletic Club	6
13	(India)	Kajali Tudu	Moitree Sansad	6
13	(India)	Sarjida Khatun	East Bengal	6
16	(India)	Sushmita Bardhan	East Bengal	5
16	(India)	Remi Thokchom	Bally Gramanchal Krira Samity	5
16	(India)	Devneta Roy	Sreebhumi	5
16	(India)	Arpita Roy	KFA Southern Samity	5
16	(India)	Sujata Mahata	Sreebhumi	5
16	(India)	Mousumi Murmu	Sreebhumi	5
