= Mohammedan SC (women) =

Women's professional football team

Mohammedan Women
- Full name: Mohammedan Sporting Club Women
- Nickname: The Black Panthers
- Short name: MSC
- Founded: 2022; 4 years ago
- Ground: Mohammedan Sporting Ground
- Capacity: 15,000
- Owners: Mohammedan Sporting Club Private Limited (50%); Bunkerhill Private Limited (50%)
- President: Gulam Ashraf
- Head coach: Alauddin Rahaman
- League: Calcutta Women's Football League
- 2022–23: Group stage
- Website: https://mohammedansc.com/
Home colours	Away colours	Third colours

Mohammedan Sporting Club Women is an Indian women's football club based in Kolkata, West Bengal. It is the women's football section of Mohammedan SC. They compete in the Calcutta Women's Football League, the top-flight tournament of women's football in the state of West Bengal under the Indian Football Association.

== History ==
=== Formation ===
In 2022, the football section of the club was instituted for the first time and they participated in the 2022–23 Calcutta Women's Football League. They went past the group stage and qualified for the knockouts, where they finished as semi-finalists in their inaugural season before losing to the eventual winners East Bengal.

== Stadium ==
The Mohammedan Sporting Ground is located in Kolkata, and is the home ground of the club.

== Players ==
As of 2023–24 Calcutta Womens Football League

Note: Flags indicate national team as defined under FIFA eligibility rules; some limited exceptions apply. Players may hold more than one non-FIFA nationality.

No.	Pos.	Nation	Player
1	GK	IND	Anima Murmu
2	DF	IND	Barsha Santra (captain)
3	DF	IND	Sohagi Murmu
5	DF	IND	Supriya Malik
7	FW	IND	Barsha Maji
9	FW	IND	Ropni Hansdah
10	DF	IND	Barsha Das
11	MF	IND	Tripti Santra
12	MF	IND	Urmila Kishku
13	DF	IND	Jayanti Murmu
14	MF	IND	Sujata Roy
15	MF	IND	Shrabani Hansda

No.	Pos.	Nation	Player
18	FW	IND	Payel Murmu
19	MF	IND	Mamani Jana
20	DF	IND	Mondira Himbram
21	GK	IND	Srimati Baske
22	DF	IND	Sania Parvin
23	MF	IND	Susmita Orang
24	FW	IND	Supriya
27	MF	IND	Koyel Murmu
29	MF	IND	Zeba
30	MF	IND	Khushi Malek

== Records and statistics ==
=== League history ===
Season	Kanyashree Cup (Note: Calcutta Women's Football League also referred to as Kanyashree Cup since 2020)	Women's IFA Shield
2022–23	Semi-finalists	Group stage
2023–24	Group stage	–
2024–25	Withdrew	–

=== Overall record in Calcutta Women's Football League ===
As of till the end of 2022–23 season.

Mohammedan SC Women's Team overall record in Calcutta Women's Football League
Season	P	W	D	L	GF	GA	GD	Win %	Top Scorer	Goals
2022–23	8	6	1	1	26	4	+22	75.00	(India) Neha Sillay (India) Anita Kumari	6
2023–24	7	2	1	4	7	17	−10	28.57	(India) Labani Mistri	2

== Coach history ==
List of Mohammedan SC women's team head coaches.

Dates	Name	Ref
2022–2023	Tashi Palzor Bhutia	
2023–	Alauddin Rahaman	

== See also ==
- Mohammedan SC Futsal
