= Sarita Yumnam =

Indian football player

Personal information
- Date of birth: 4 February 2002 (age 24)
- Place of birth: Manipur, India
- Height: 1.53 m (5 ft 0 in)
- Position: Defender

Team information
- Current team: East Bengal
- Number: 6

Senior career*
Years	Team	Apps	(Gls)
- The Young Welfare Club
- Gokulam Kerala
2022–2023	Kickstart		
2023–	East Bengal		

International career^{‡}
2026–	India	4	(0)
- * Club domestic league appearances and goals ‡ National team caps and goals as of 25 May 2026

Sarita Yumnam (4 February 2002) is an Indian professional footballer from Manipur, who plays as a defender for the Indian Women's League club East Bengal and the India women's national football team. She has also represented the clubs Gokulam Kerala and Kickstart.

== Early life ==
Yumnam was born in Manipur on 4 February 2002.

== Career ==
Before signing for East Bengal Football Club, she played for the Young Welfare Club, Kickstart FC Karnataka and Gokulam Kerala FC.

She was selected for the senior Indian team to play the AFC Women's Asia Cup in Perth, Australia.

== Career statistics ==
=== International ===
As of 25 May 2026

National team	Year	Caps	Goals
India	2026	4	0
Total		4	0

== Honours ==
India

- SAFF Women's Championship: 2026

East Bengal

- SAFF Women's Club Championship: 2025
- Indian Women's League: 2024–25, 2025–26
- Calcutta Women's Football League (Kanyashree Cup): 2024–25
