= Sushmita Lepcha =

Indian football player

Personal information
- Date of birth: 19 March 1996 (age 30)
- Place of birth: Kalimpong, West Bengal, India
- Height: 1.53 m (5 ft 0 in)
- Position: Defender

Team information
- Current team: East Bengal
- Number: 15

Senior career*
Years	Team	Apps	(Gls)
- Sevayani SWO
- PIFA Sports
2019–2020	Baroda FA		
- Signature FC
- FC Tuem
2022–2024	Kickstart		
2024–	East Bengal		
- * Club domestic league appearances and goals

Sushmita Lepcha (19 March 1996) is an Indian professional footballer from West Bengal, who plays as a defender for the Indian Women's League club East Bengal FC and the India women's national football team.

== Early life ==
She is from Kalimpong in northern West Bengal.

== Career ==
She was selected for the senior India for the AFC Women's Asia Cup which was held in Australia. She played for Sevayani Social Welfare Club in the Calcutta Women's Football League. She also played for Pipa FC and Kickstart FC in 2020.

In 2023, she played for Bengal in the Senior Women’s National Football Championship (for Rajmata Jijabai Trophy) and was also represented the state team in 2024, where Bengal reached the semifinals.

== Honours ==
East Bengal

- SAFF Women's Club Championship: 2025
- Indian Women's League: 2024–25, 2025–26
- Calcutta Women's Football League (Kanyashree Cup): 2024–25
