= New Alipore Suruchi Sangha =

Association football club in Kolkata, India

Suruchi Sangha সুরুচি সংঘ
- Full name: New Alipore Suruchi Sangha
- Nickname: Suruchi Sangha
- Short name: SUS; NASS
- Founded: 1952; 74 years ago
- Ground: New Alipore Suruchi Sangha Club Ground
- Owner: Aroop Biswas
- Head coach: Ranjan Bhattacherjee
- League: M: Calcutta Premier Division; W: IWL 2 Calcutta Women's Football League
- Website: www.suruchisangha.com
Home colours	Away colours

New Alipore Suruchi Sangha, commonly referred to as Suruchi Sangha (Bengali: নিউ আলিপুর সুরুচি সংঘ), is an Indian professional football club based in New Alipore, Kolkata in the state of West Bengal. The club currently competes in CFL Premier Division, the top-tier football league in West Bengal, organised by the Indian Football Association. Their women's team participates in the Indian Women's League 2, the Indian women's second tier league.

== History ==
The club was established in 1952 as a sports and cultural club of New Alipore locality in then Calcutta.

== Women's team ==
The club's women's team participates in the Calcutta Women's Football League, the top tier of West Bengal. They made their national-stage debut in the 2024–25 Indian Women's League 2, after finishing third in the 2024 and qualifying as the best placed team in the championship round.

== Squad ==
As of 20 March 2026

Note: Flags indicate national team as defined under FIFA eligibility rules; some limited exceptions apply. Players may hold more than one non-FIFA nationality.

No.	Pos.	Nation	Player
1	GK	IND	Jyotsna Bara
2	DF	IND	Naina
3	MF	IND	Angela Bhutia
5	DF	IND	Pipili Mohanty
6	MF	IND	Kumkum Saren
7	MF	IND	Mamata Hansda
8	MF	IND	Salina Kumari
9	FW	IND	Pandimit Lepcha
10	fW	IND	Sanjana Oraon
11	DF	IND	Sunita Sarkar
12	FW	IND	Tulsi Hembram
13	FW	IND	Laxmi
14	MF	IND	Swapna Tudu
15	MF	IND	Urvashi Kumari
16	FW	IND	Roshni Baskey
17	DF	IND	Mou Chakraborty

No.	Pos.	Nation	Player
18	DF	IND	Pratima Mahata
19	GK	IND	Divya
20	FW	IND	Rakhi Mondal
21	GK	IND	Rubina Sarkar
22	DF	IND	Sunita Swain
25	MF	IND	Shila Bagti
26	MF	IND	Sneha Minj
27	DF	IND	Fatema Khatun
29	DF	IND	Koyel Halder
36	FW	IND	Roshni Baskey
45	FW	IND	Sohani Roy
47	MF	IND	Naina Kumari
55	MF	IND	Chandani Kumari
77	FW	IND	Ankita Das
99	MF	IND	Roshni Tigga

== Honours ==
=== Men's team ===
- CFL Premier Division:
  - Super Six: 2024, 2025
- CFL 1st Division:
  - Champions: 2023

=== Women's team ===
- Calcutta Women's Football League:
  - 3rd place: 2023–24
  - Semi-finalists: 2024–25
