= Mohammedan Sporting Ground =

Football stadium in Kolkata, India

Mohammedan Sporting Ground মহামেডান স্পোর্টিং গ্রাউন্ড
- Interactive map of Mohammedan Sporting Ground মহামেডান স্পোর্টিং গ্রাউন্ড
- Address: Mohammedan Sporting Club, Maidan Tent, Red Road, Kolkata 700021
- Location: Kolkata, West Bengal
- Coordinates: 22°33′44″N 88°20′45″E
- Owner: Eastern Command (India)
- Operator: Indian Football Association
- Capacity: 15,000
- Surface: Grass
- Scoreboard: Manual
- Public transit: Red Road; Esplanade Bus Terminus; Eden Gardens; Esplanade

Construction
- Opened: 1929

Tenants
- Mohammedan SC (1929–present); Howrah Union (1962–present); Mohammedan SC Women (2022–present)

Mohammedan Sporting Ground, also known as Mohammedan Sporting–Howrah Union Ground, is a multi-use stadium in Kolkata, West Bengal. It is used mostly for football matches and is mainly the home stadium of Mohammedan. The ground has a natural grass turf. Having facilities such as commentary boxes for radio and TV, press box and air conditioned changing rooms, the stadium holds 15,000 people. It is also the home ground of Howrah Union, which it shares with Mohammedan.

== About ==
The stadium has galleries on three sides and a rampart on the fourth side. The north side gallery is the member's gallery. The east side and south side galleries are still made of a temporary iron structure and are designated for non-member supporters. The playing pitch is about 100 x 60 meters. The club tent and main office are located adjacent to the stadium. The club tent consists of a maintained lawn, with benches.

== Upgrade work ==
In July 2023 second phase upgrade and improvement works started.

- Installing floodlight
- electronic scoreboard
- increase seating capacity from 15,000 to 25,000
- upgrade member gallery with White-Black (club's home colour) bucket chairs
- air conditioned press room
- ultra-modern gymnasium
