= Karthika Angamuthu =

Indian footballer (born 1999)

Personal information
- Date of birth: 21 November 1999 (age 26)
- Place of birth: Karipatti, Salem, Tamil Nadu, India
- Position: Midfielder

Team information
- Current team: East Bengal
- Number: 12

Senior career*
Years	Team	Apps	(Gls)
- Sethu
2022	Lords FA Kochi		
2022–2024	Odisha		
2024–	East Bengal		

International career^{‡}
2021–	India	16	(1)
- * Club domestic league appearances and goals ‡ National team caps and goals as of 2 July 2025

Karthika Angamuthu (born 21 November 1999) is an Indian professional footballer from Tamil Nadu, who plays as a midfielder for the club East Bengal in the Indian Women's League and the India women's national football team. She has also played for Sethu FC and Odisha.

== Early life ==
Karthika hails from Salem district, Tamil Nadu. She comes from a lower-middle-class family and her parents are Cotton Mill workers. She started playing football at the age of 15 years. Initially, the parents were reluctant to send their daughter on outstation trips but later after watching her success encourage her.

== Career ==
In 2019 Karthika started playing the Hero Indian Women's League and she was selected to the Indian team after a good performance in the league. She made her Senior India debut in Venezuela in December 2021. In January 2022, she was named in the Indian team to play AFC Women's Asian Cup. The year 2023 has been a busy season for Karthika. In March, she played in the international friendly match against Uzbekistan at Tashkent. And in April, she was part of the Indian team that played the Women's Olympic Qualifier Round 1 at Bishkek, Kyrgyz Republic. Later, she played two friendlies against Nepal in Chennai. In June, she played for Tamil Nadu in the Senior Women's National Football Championship at Amritsar, Punjab.

== Career statistics ==
=== International ===
As of 2 July 2025

National team	Year	Caps	Goals
India	2021	1	0
India	2022	1	0
India	2023	7	0
India	2024	4	0
India	2025	3	1
Total		16	1

Scores and results list India's goal tally first.

List of international goals scored by Karthika Angamuthu
No.	Date	Venue	Opponent	Score	Result	Competition
1.	2 July 2025	700th Anniversary Stadium, Chiang Mai, Thailand	Iraq	3–0	5–0	2026 AFC Women's Asian Cup qualification

== Honours ==
Odisha

- Indian Women's League: 2023–24

East Bengal

- SAFF Women's Club Championship: 2025
- Indian Women's League: 2024–25, 2025–26
