= Rimpa Haldar =

Indian footballer

Personal information
- Date of birth: 6 February 2005 (age 21)
- Place of birth: Hanspukuria, Nadia, West Bengal, India
- Height: 1.52 m (5 ft 0 in)
- Position: Forward

Team information
- Current team: East Bengal
- Number: 67

Senior career*
Years	Team	Apps	(Gls)
- Nadia DSA
2019–2020	Police AC		
- Sarojini Naidu Orient SC
- Lord's FA Kochi
2022–2023	East Bengal		
2023–2026	Sribhumi		
2026–	East Bengal		

International career^{‡}
2024–	India	14	(2)
- * Club domestic league appearances and goals ‡ National team caps and goals as of 15 April 2026

Rimpa Haldar (born 6 February 2005) is an Indian professional footballer from West Bengal who plays as a forward for the Indian Women's League club East Bengal and the India women's national football team.

== Early life and career ==
Haldar is from Haspukuria village, Palashipara in Nadia district. Her father Shrivas Haldar is a daily wage labourer. She did her schooling at Haspukuria Vidyalaya. She began with athletics and specialized in 100m and 200m sprints. Then she took up football on the suggestion of her coach Aveek Biswas, and joined the Sporting Union Club in her village where she learnt her basics. She is the only girl from the region to make it to the National team. In 2019, she moved to Kolkata and joined the Kolkata Police Club.

== Career ==
She made her senior India debut in the SAFF Women's Championship in October 2024 at Kathmandu, Nepal. Earlier, she played for different clubs including East Bengal FC, Lord's FA, Kochi, Sarojini Naidu Orient Sports Club, Police Athletic Club and Nadia district sports authority team. She first took part in the Kanyashree Cup in Kolkata after joining Sarojini Naidu Club. Soon she was selected for the West Bengal Under–17 team and she captained the squad. She went on to play for the Under–19 team. She also took part in the IFA Shield competition, National Games and Khelo India games.

She played the Kolkata women's football league and was the top scorer for two years. She represents Sreebhumi FC in the 2024–2025 season of the Indian Women's League. In 2023–2024, she played the IWL 2. In December 2024, she played the senior international friendlies against Maldives at the Padukone-Dravid Centre for Sports Excellence in Bengaluru.

== Career statistics ==
=== International ===
As of 15 April 2026

National team	Year	Caps	Goals
India	2024	3	1
India	2025	7	1
India	2026	4	0
Total		14	2

Scores and results list India's goal tally first.

List of international goals scored by Rimpa Haldar
No.	Date	Venue	Opponent	Score	Result	Competition
1.	30 December 2024	Padukone – Dravid Centre for Sports Excellence, Bengaluru, India	Maldives	13–0	14–0	Friendly
2.	23 June 2025	700th Anniversary Stadium, Chiang Mai, Thailand	Mongolia	9–0	13–0	2026 AFC Women's Asian Cup qualification
