= Astam Oraon =

Indian football player (born 2005)

Personal information
- Date of birth: 5 February 2005 (age 21)
- Place of birth: Gorratoli, Gumla, Jharkhand, India
- Height: 1.53 m (5 ft 0 in)
- Position: Defender

Team information
- Current team: East Bengal
- Number: 5

Senior career*
Years	Team	Apps	(Gls)
- Lords FA Kochi
2022–2023	Kickstart		
2023–2024	Odisha		
2024–	East Bengal		

International career^{‡}
2022	India U17	3	(0)
2021–2024	India U20	13	(1)
2021–	India	13	(1)
- * Club domestic league appearances and goals ‡ National team caps and goals as of 6 June 2026

Astam Oraon (born 5 February 2005) is an Indian professional footballer from Jharkhand who plays as a defender for East Bengal in the Indian Women's League and the India women's national football team. She captained the India Under-17 team in the FIFA U-17 Women's World Cup hosted by India in October 2022. A road was built in her village by the local administration in the name of Astam Oraon to celebrate her nomination as the captain.

== Early life ==
Oraon hails from Banari Goratoli village in Bishunpur block of Gumla district, Jharkhand. She is born in a poor family to Heeralal Oraon and Tara Devi. Both are daily wage labourers. They live in a small house with tiled roof but use a plastic sheet to prevent water seeping in during rains. She has four sisters and a brother. She is studying in Class 12 at St. Columbus Collegiate School, Hazaribagh and trains at the attached Football Training Centre. In October, after she was selected as the captain of the Indian team, she was named as the district's brand ambassador for a government scheme that supports girl child's education, named Savitribai Phule Kishori Samriddhi Yojana (SPKSY). The district administration also gifted a TV for her parents to watch the matches.

== Career ==
Oraon's father, a footballer who had to stop due to an injury, introduced the game to her daughter and in 2016 admitted her in the Girls Football Training Centre at Hazaribagh. Her first coach was Sony. She was called for the Junior India camp in 2019. She captained the Indian youth team at the U-17 World Cup in 2022.

== Career statistics ==
=== International ===
As of 6 June 2026

National team	Year	Caps	Goals
India	2021	1	0
India	2022	0	0
India	2023	3	0
India	2024	3	0
India	2025	0	0
India	2026	6	1
Total		13	1

Scores and results list India's goal tally first, score column indicates score after each Oraon goal.

List of international goals scored by Astam Oraon
No.	Date	Venue	Opponent	Score	Result	Competition
1.	15 April 2026	Nyayo National Stadium, Nairobi, Kenya	Malawi	1–0	3–2	2026 FIFA Series

== Honours ==
India

- SAFF Women's Championship: 2026

East Bengal

- SAFF Women's Club Championship: 2025
- Indian Women's League: 2024–25, 2025–26

Odisha

- Indian Women's League: 2023–24

Kickstart

- Indian Women's League runner-up: 2022–23

Lords FA

- Kerala Women's League: 2022–23
