= East Bengal Ground =

Football stadium in Kolkata, India

East Bengal Ground ইস্টবেঙ্গল গ্রাউন্ড
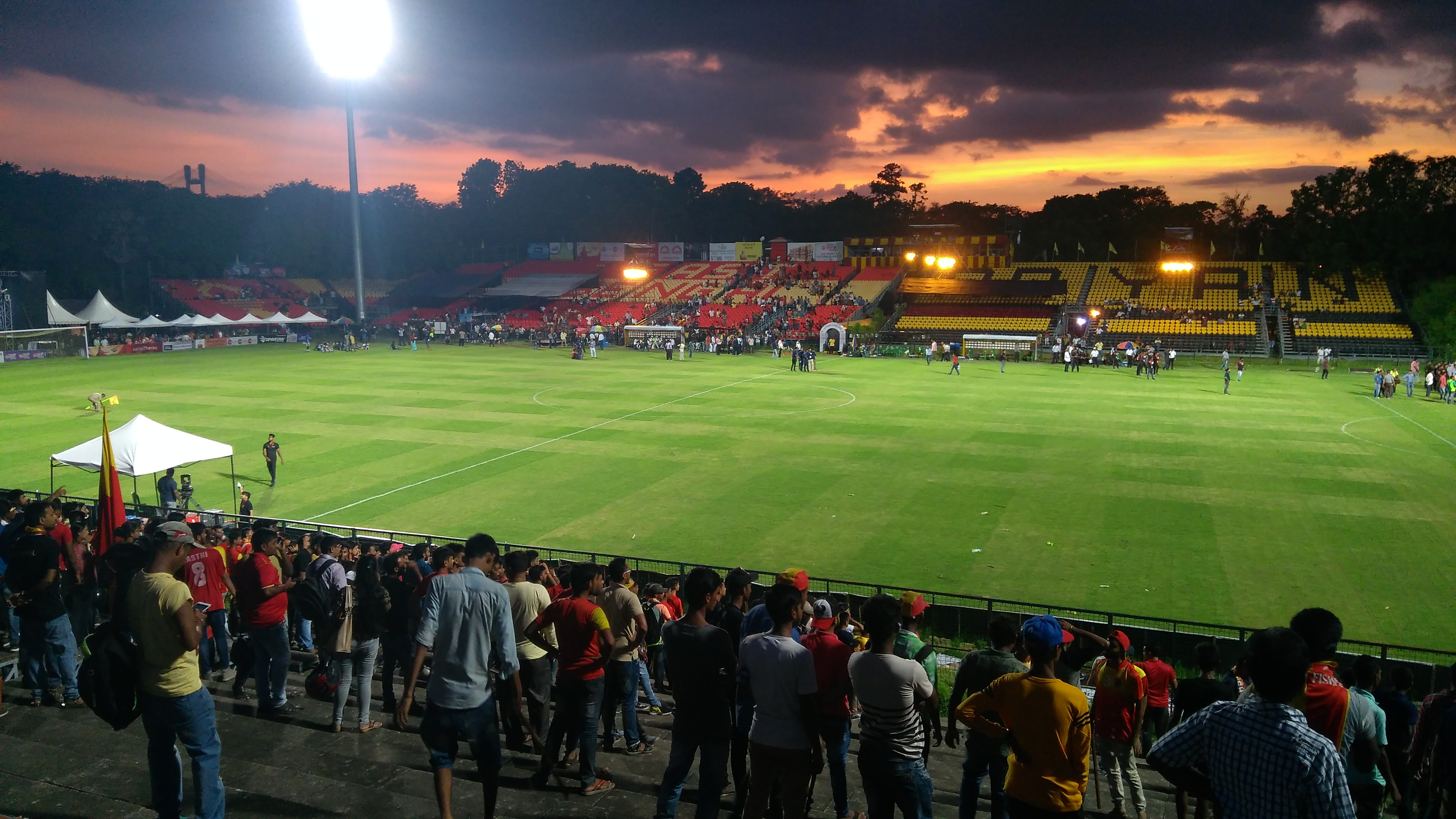
- East Bengal Ground on a matchday
- Interactive map of East Bengal Ground ইস্টবেঙ্গল গ্রাউন্ড
- Former names: National AC Ground
- Location: Kolkata Maidan
- Coordinates: 22°33′34″N 88°20′38″E
- Owner: Eastern Command (India)
- Operator: Indian Football Association
- Capacity: 23,500
- Surface: Grass
- Scoreboard: Yes (manual)
- Field size: 100 metres by 60 metres (109.4 yd x 65.6 yd)
- Public transit: Esplanade Bus Terminus; Eden Gardens; Esplanade

Construction
- Opened: 1915
- Renovated: 12 July 1996; 1 August 2016

Tenants
- East Bengal (1924–present); East Bengal Academy; East Bengal FC (women); Aryan FC (1963–present); Mohun Bagan (1915–1963); Bengal Super League (selected matches)

The East Bengal Ground, also known as East Bengal–Aryan Ground, is the home stadium of East Bengal and Aryan. The stadium has a capacity of 23,500 people. It is best known as one of the venues for the Calcutta Football League.

The stadium lies in the Kolkata Maidan area on the northern side of Fort William and near the Eden Gardens cricket stadium. The Esplanade metro station on the North-South Corridor of the Kolkata Metro is also nearby.

== History ==
When East Bengal Club was formed in 1920, they used to play at the Kumortuli Park Ground in the initial days. In 1921, East Bengal Club started playing in the Calcutta Football League Second Division. Most of the matches were held at the Calcutta FC Ground.

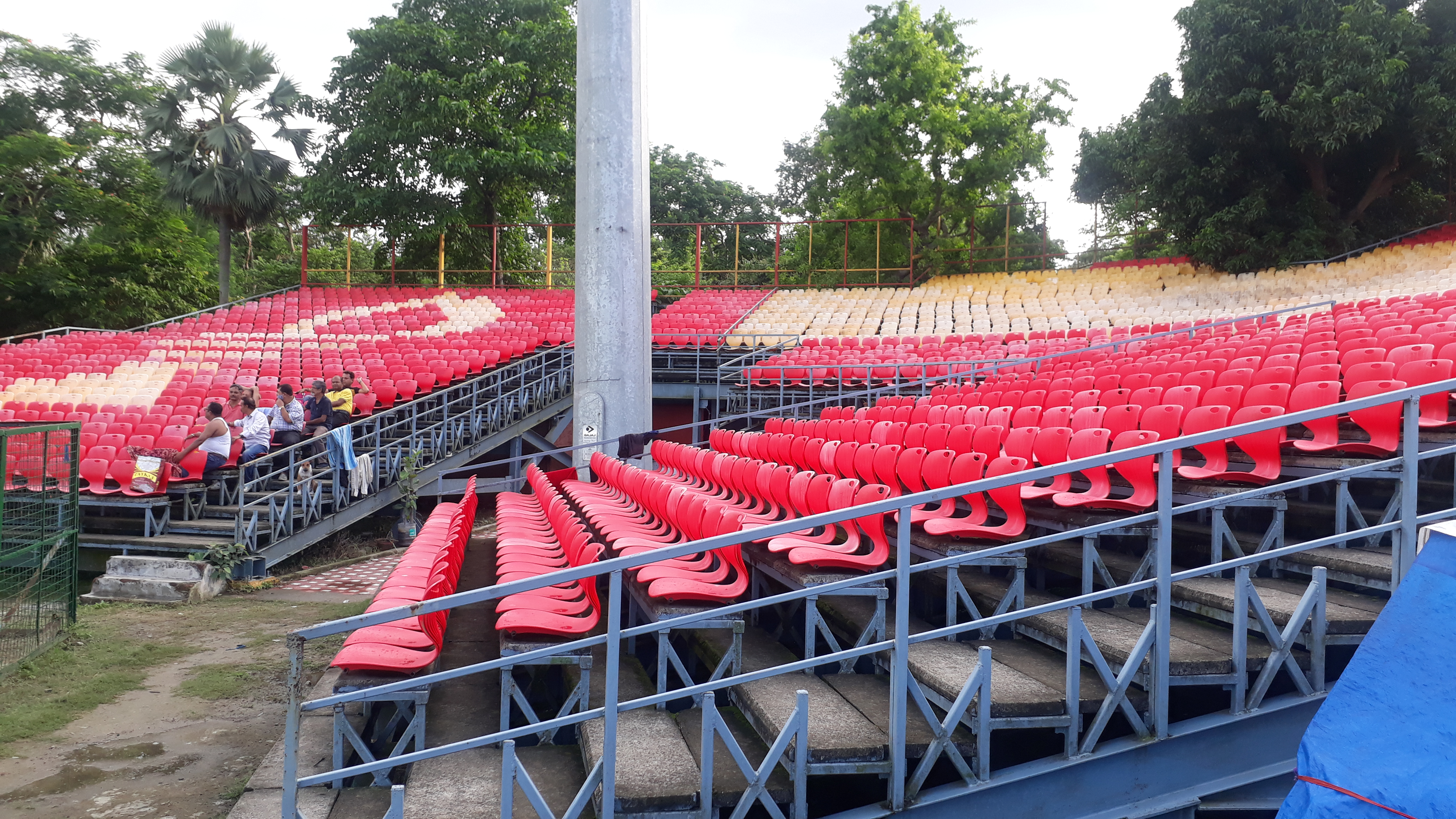
East Bengal Ground gallery

After the 1923 season, East Bengal Club owners were in the lookout for a club ground of their own where the team can play their matches. According to the existing rule of the maidan, two clubs used to share one common ground. Club's founders and then vice-presidents, Shri Sureshchandra Choudhury and Raybahadur Taritbhushan Ray came to learn that Mohun Bagan shared its ground with National Association, which by that time had ceased to exist. They referred this discrepancy to the police authorities and subsequently demanded the share for East Bengal. It was then that Police Commissioner Charles Tegart ordered Mohun Bagan to share its ground with East Bengal. This sudden decision enraged the Mohun Bagan officials. However, despite their protests, East Bengal Club got the ground for their own in 1924, which they co-shared with their arch-rivals Mohun Bagan until 1963, when finally Mohun Bagan moved out to their own Mohun Bagan Ground. In those days, the goalposts were placed east–west and East Bengal took possession of the half towards the Red Road. Another century-old Kolkata club, Aryan F.C. started sharing the club ground since then.

== About ==
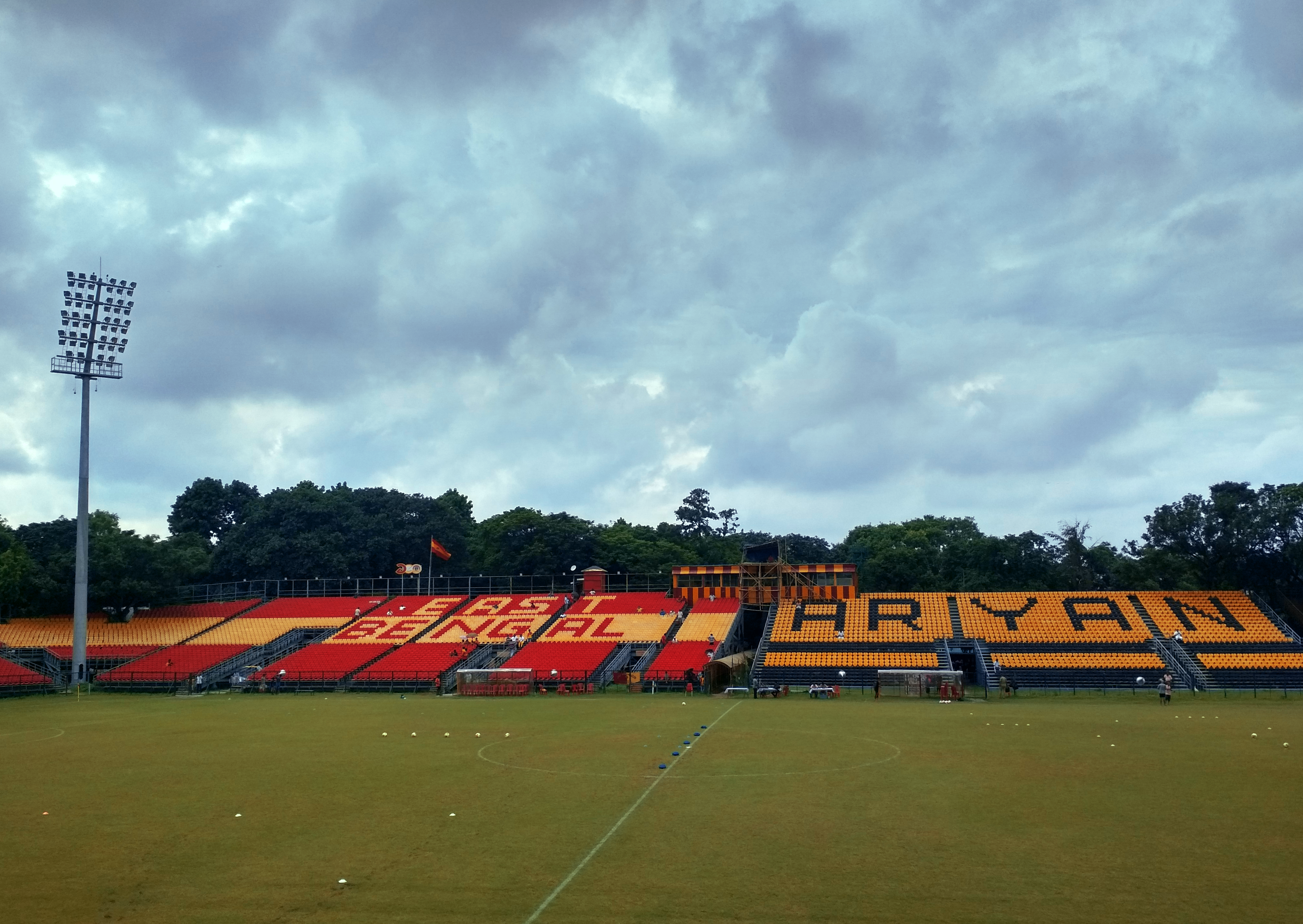
East Bengal Ground in 2019 during Calcutta Football League

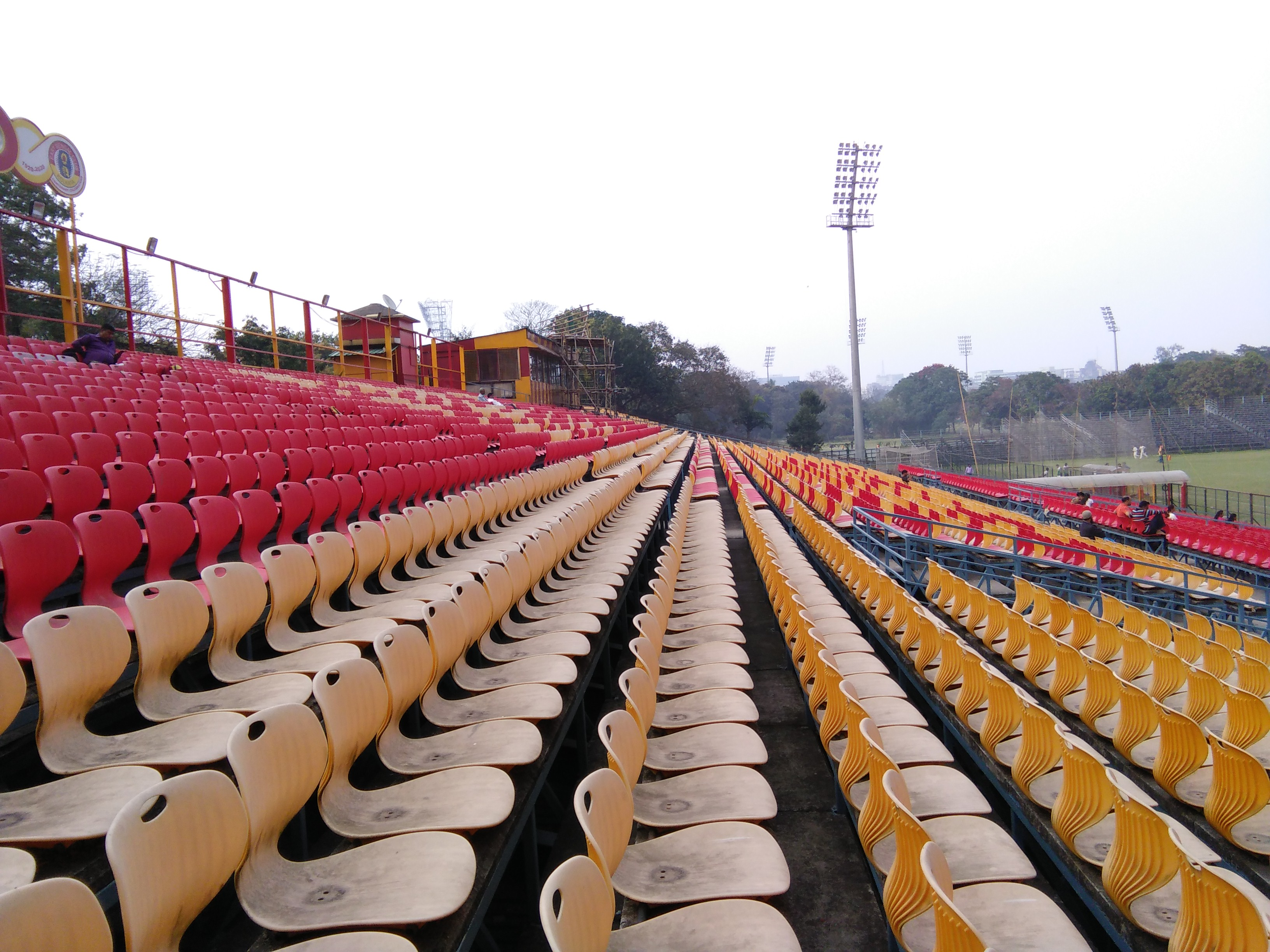
East Bengal ground members gallery

The East Bengal Ground has galleries on three sides. The west side is the member's gallery with modern facilities like bucket seats and elevators installed. The half of west side is also shared with Aryan F.C. who have their member's gallery as well, covered in bucket seats which acts as an away gallery for the matches which East Bengal F.C. plays. The east side and north side galleries are still made of a temporary wooden and steel structure and are designated for non-member supporters. The playing pitch is about 100 metres x 60 metres in dimension. Just adjacent the stadium, below the member's gallery is the club tent and the main office located. In 2014, the club tent opened its own cafe lounge for the fans, just beside the members' gallery.

=== Renovations ===
==== First Renovation in 1996 ====
On 12 July 1996, the new Club Office or "Tent", which is popularly known in Kolkata maidan, was inaugurated by the oldest member of the East Bengal Club. The then club secretary Mr. Dipak "Poltu" Das gave the honour to Mr. Shankar Pillai (popularly known as Shankar Mali) who was the oldest groundsman and caretaker of the club, to inaugurate the new club tent in the presence of club legends like Ahmed Khan and Byomkesh Bose.

The club ground was renovated and a new office was set up at the place where it is currently situated. The playing field was relaid North to South and the new fans gallery was constructed.

==== Second Renovation post 2016 ====
In 2016, renovations were done at the ground with entire playing field being relaid and galleries being renovated with member's gallery being filled in with Red and Gold bucket seats. Elevators were installed and the commentary box was modernised. The playing turf was relaid and drainage was improved for the ground. East Bengal FC officials informed the AIFF that they wanted to host I-League matches at the club ground after the heavy renovations.

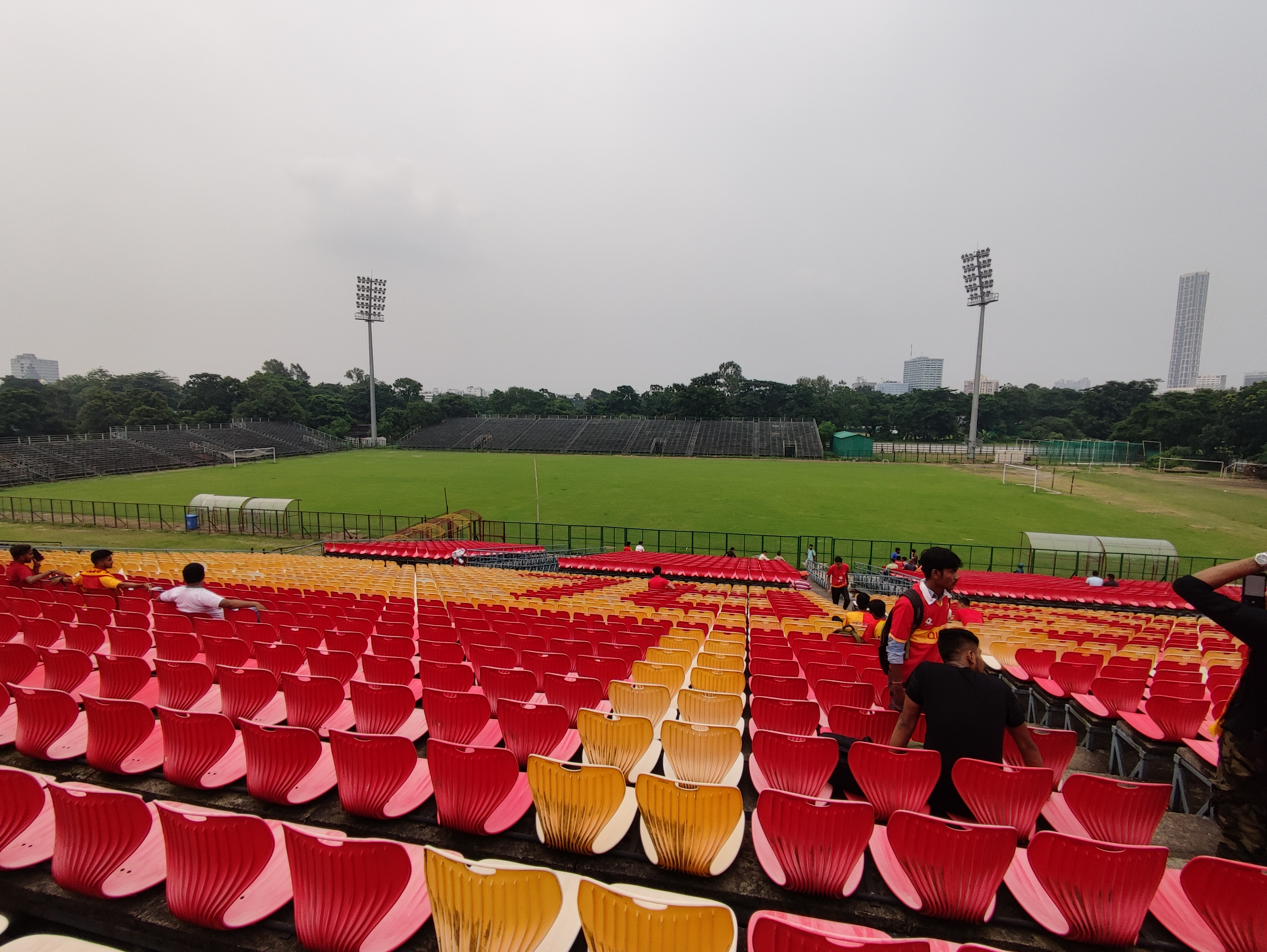
East Bengal Ground in August 2022

In 2018, floodlights were installed at the East Bengal Ground. The flood lights would be the biggest among the three Maidan clubs of Kolkata. The first match under floodlights was played in the 2018–19 Calcutta Premier Division when East Bengal faced Tollygunge Agragami in the season opener, which was however abandoned due to heavy rains as the match was tied 1–1 at half time.

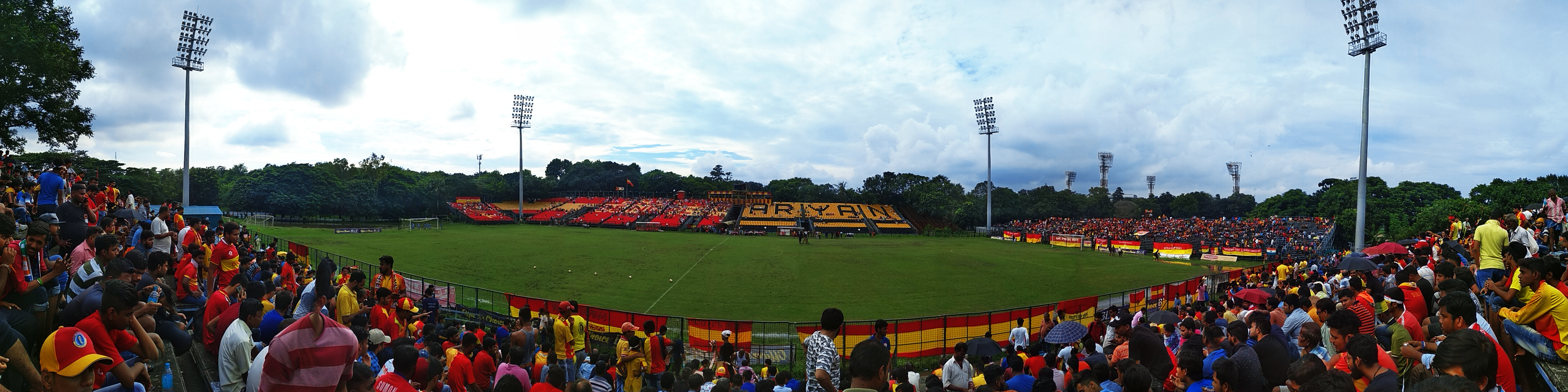
A panorama of East Bengal Ground from East side gallery showing the members gallery and north gallery during 2019 Calcutta Football League

In 2023, East Bengal built a luxurious VVIP lounge at the East Bengal Ground and named it after Krishanu Dey.

== Other uses ==
East Bengal Ground layout

East Bengal Ground hosted numerous other matches of IFA Shield, Calcutta Football League, and various under-aged league matches. It also hosted a number of matches for the 2019 Durand Cup.

In 1984, it served as the practice ground for the Argentina football team who came in to play for the 1984 Nehru Cup.

=== Non-sporting events ===
- In 2015, Bollywood superstar Shah Rukh Khan and Kajol hosted the promotional event for their film Dilwale at the East Bengal Ground. Both were given life-time membership by the club.
- On 7 July 2016, Mexican-American professional wrestler, Alberto Del Rio visited the East Bengal Ground for a promotional event for WWE. He was handed over a red and gold East Bengal jersey with his name printed on it.
- On 11 December 2016, East Bengal Ground hosted the official Manchester United event "ILOVEUnited". Former United legend and club ambassador Dwight Yorke along with former players Quinton Fortune and Bojan Djordjic came in for various events that followed throughout the day. The screening was also organised for the English Premier League game between Manchester United and Tottenham Hotspurs in the event for fans in Kolkata.
- On 28 October 2018, East Bengal Ground hosted the La Liga official screening of the El Clasico for the fans in Kolkata. Former Liverpool and Real Madrid player Steve McManaman came in as the La Liga ambassador for the event.

== Bibliography ==
- Roy, Gautam (1 January 2021). East Bengal 100. Allsport Foundation. ISBN 978-8194763109.
- Goswami, Ramesh Chandra (1963). East Bengal Cluber Itihas (in Bengali). Kolkata: Book Garden.
- Bandyopadhyay, Santipriya (1979). Cluber Naam East Bengal (in Bengali). Kolkata: New Bengal Press.
- Saha, Rupak (2020). East Bengal – Prothom Eksho Bochor (in Bengali). Kolkata: The Cafe Table. ISBN 978-93-89873-21-4.
